= 1999 Copa América knockout stage =

The 1999 Copa América final stages were the elimination stages of the Copa América, following the group stage. They began on 10 July 1999, and consisted of the quarterfinals, the semifinals, the third-place match, and the final held at the Estadio Defensores del Chaco on 18 July in Asunción. No extra time was played if any match in the final stages finished tied after regulation and tied matched went straight to a penalty shootout.

== Qualified teams ==
Group	Winner	Runner-up	Third place (Best two qualified)
A	Paraguay	Peru	—
B	Brazil	Mexico	Chile
C	Colombia	Argentina	Uruguay

== Bracket ==
Quarterfinals
July 10 - Asunción
Paraguay	1 (3)
Uruguay	1 (5)
July 11 - Luque
Colombia	2
Chile	3
July 10 - Asunción
Peru	3 (2)
Mexico	3 (4)
July 11 - Ciudad del Este
Brazil	2
Argentina	1

Semifinals
July 13 - Asunción
Uruguay	1 (5)
Chile	1 (3)
July 14 - Ciudad del Este
Mexico	0
Brazil	2

Final
July 18 - Asunción
Uruguay	0
Brazil	3
Third Place
July 17 - Asunción
Chile	1
Mexico	2

== Quarterfinals ==
=== Peru v Mexico ===
10 July 1999
15:05

Peru	3–3	Mexico
Palacios 5'; Pereda 15'; Solano 40'	Report	Hernández 29', 33' (pen.); Torrado 88'
Penalties
Solano (penalty scored); Jor. Soto (penalty scored); Jos. Soto (penalty missed); Reynoso (penalty missed)	2–4	(penalty scored) Suárez; (penalty scored) Terrazas; (penalty scored) R. García; (penalty scored) Zepeda

Estadio Defensores del Chaco, Asunción
Attendance: 32,000
Referee: Wilson de Souza (Brazil)

Peru	Mexico

GK	1	Óscar Ibáñez
DF	6	José Soto
DF	3	Juan Reynoso
DF	2	Miguel Rebosio
MF	14	Jorge Soto
MF	8	Juan Jayo
MF	15	José Pereda	(yellow card) 52'
MF	7	Nolberto Solano	(yellow card) 78'
MF	10	Roberto Palacios	(yellow card) 55'
FW	17	Roberto Holsen		(substituted off) 24'
FW	9	Flavio Maestri		(substituted off) 79'
Substitutions:
FW	22	Ysrael Zúñiga		(substituted on) 24'	(substituted off) 66'
MF	19	Marko Ciurlizza		(substituted on) 66'
FW	18	Claudio Pizarro		(substituted on) 79'
Manager:
Juan Carlos Oblitas

GK	1	Jorge Campos
DF	7	Ramón Ramírez
DF	2	Claudio Suárez
DF	3	Joel Sánchez		(substituted off) 68'
DF	4	Rafael Márquez
MF	5	Gerardo Torrado	(yellow card) 55'
MF	18	Salvador Carmona
MF	8	Alberto García Aspe		(substituted off) 47'
MF	19	Miguel Zepeda
FW	15	Luis Hernández
FW	17	Francisco Palencia		(substituted off) 88'
Substitutions:
FW	11	Daniel Osorno		(substituted on) 47'
MF	20	Rafael García		(substituted on) 68'
DF	14	Isaac Terrazas		(substituted on) 88'
Manager:
Manuel Lapuente

=== Paraguay v Uruguay ===
10 July 1999
17:35

Paraguay	1–1	Uruguay
Benítez 15'	Report	Zalayeta 65'
Penalties
Gamarra (penalty scored); Acuña (penalty scored); Enciso (penalty scored); Benítez (penalty missed)	3–5	(penalty scored) Fleurquin; (penalty scored) Guigou; (penalty scored) Alonso; (penalty scored) Zalayeta; (penalty scored) Magallanes

Estadio Defensores del Chaco, Asunción
Attendance: 32,000
Referee: Óscar Ruiz (Colombia)

Paraguay	Uruguay

GK	1	Ricardo Tavarelli	(yellow card) 90+'
DF	2	Francisco Arce
DF	21	Denis Caniza
DF	4	Carlos Gamarra
DF	5	Delio Toledo
MF	8	Roberto Acuña	(yellow card) 77'
MF	6	Julio César Enciso
MF	17	Carlos Paredes
MF	10	Guido Alvarenga		(substituted off) 68'
FW	9	Miguel Ángel Benítez
FW	11	Roque Santa Cruz		(substituted off) 75'
Substitutions:
MF	18	Hugo Ovelar		(substituted on) 68'
FW	15	Mauro Caballero		(substituted on) 75'
Manager:
Ever Almeida

GK	1	Fabián Carini
DF	17	Martín del Campo
DF	3	Fernando Picun	Booked
DF	14	Alejandro Lembo		(substituted off) 89'
DF	22	Federico Bergara		(substituted off) 53'
MF	7	Fabián Coelho
MF	5	Andrés Fleurquin	(yellow card) 15'
MF	18	Pablo García	(yellow card) 29'
FW	10	Federico Magallanes	(yellow card) 50'
FW	11	Gabriel Álvez		(substituted off) 58'
FW	9	Marcelo Zalayeta
Substitutions:
MF	6	Gianni Guigou		(substituted on) 53'
FW	19	Diego Alonso		(substituted on) 58'
DF	2	Diego López		(substituted on) 89'
Manager:
Víctor Púa

=== Colombia v Chile ===
11 July 1999
14:35

Colombia	2–3	Chile
Bolaño 7'; Bonilla 35'	Report	Reyes 25', 49'; Zamorano 64'

Estadio Feliciano Cáceres, Luque
Attendance: 12,000
Referee: Benito Archundia (Mexico)

Colombia	Chile

GK	1	Miguel Calero
DF	18	Rubiel Quintana
DF	5	Jorge Bermúdez
DF	2	Iván Córdoba	(yellow card) 62'
DF	3	Roberto Carlos Cortés
MF	13	Jorge Bolaño		(substituted off) 46'
MF	20	Freddy Grisales		(substituted off) 69'
MF	8	Harold Lozano
MF	14	Arley Betancourth	(yellow card) 66'
FW	9	Víctor Bonilla
FW	19	Hámilton Ricard		(substituted off) 60'
Substitutions:
MF	6	Juan Carlos Ramírez		(substituted on) 46'
FW	7	Edwin Congo		(substituted on) 60'
MF	10	Neider Morantes		(substituted on) 69'
Manager:
Javier Alvarez

GK	1	Marcelo Ramírez
DF	2	Raúl Palacios
DF	6	Pedro Reyes
DF	3	Miguel Ramírez	(yellow card) 89'
DF	13	Jorge Vargas
MF	16	Mauricio Aros
MF	8	Clarence Acuña	(yellow card) 60'
MF	20	Fabián Estay		(substituted off) 78'
MF	10	José Luis Sierra		(substituted off) 65'
FW	9	Iván Zamorano
FW	18	Pedro González		(substituted off) 86'
Substitutions:
FW	22	David Pizarro		(substituted on) 65'
MF	14	Roberto Cartes		(substituted on) 78'
FW	17	Claudio Núñez		(substituted on) 86'
Manager:
(Uruguay) Nelson Acosta

=== Brazil v Argentina ===
11 July 1999
17:05

Brazil	2–1	Argentina
Rivaldo 32'; Ronaldo 48'	Report	Sorín 11'

Estadio Antonio Oddone Sarubbi, Ciudad del Este
Attendance: 25,000
Referee: Gustavo Méndez (Uruguay)

Brazil	Argentina

GK	1	Dida
DF	2	Cafu
DF	15	João Carlos
DF	4	Antônio Carlos
DF	6	Roberto Carlos	(yellow card) 38'
MF	5	Emerson
MF	18	Flávio Conceição
MF	22	Zé Roberto	(yellow card) 67'	(substituted off) 73'
FW	10	Rivaldo
FW	7	Márcio Amoroso		(substituted off) 81'
FW	9	Ronaldo	(yellow card) 18'
Substitutions:
MF	19	Beto		(substituted on) 73'
FW	20	Christian		(substituted on) 81'
Manager:
Vanderlei Luxemburgo

GK	1	Germán Burgos	(yellow card) 67'
DF	14	Mauricio Pochettino
DF	2	Roberto Ayala
DF	6	Walter Samuel	(yellow card) 13'
MF	3	Juan Pablo Sorín		(substituted off) 69'
MF	8	Javier Zanetti
MF	5	Diego Simeone	(yellow card) 26'	(substituted off) 69'
MF	22	Juan Román Riquelme
FW	10	Ariel Ortega	(yellow card) 80'
FW	9	Martín Palermo	(yellow card) 90'
FW	21	Kily González
Substitutions:
MF	11	Gustavo López		(substituted on) 69'
MF	18	Diego Cagna		(substituted on) 69'
Manager:
Marcelo Bielsa

== Semifinals ==
=== Uruguay v Chile ===
13 July 1999
21:05

Uruguay	1–1	Chile
Lembo 23'	Report	Zamorano 63'
Penalties
Del Campo (penalty scored); Guigou (penalty scored); Alonso (penalty scored); Zalayeta (penalty scored); Magallanes (penalty scored)	5–3	(penalty scored) Vargas; (penalty missed) Aros; (penalty scored) Reyes; (penalty scored) Pizarro

Estadio Defensores del Chaco, Asunción
Attendance: 12,000
Referee: Ubaldo Aquino (Paraguay)

Uruguay	Chile

GK	1	Fabián Carini
DF	17	Martín del Campo
DF	14	Alejandro Lembo
DF	3	Fernando Picun	(yellow card) 74'
DF	22	Federico Bergara		(substituted off) 81'
MF	18	Pablo García	(yellow card) 73'
MF	5	Andrés Fleurquin		(substituted off) 65'
MF	7	Fabián Coelho
FW	10	Federico Magallanes
FW	11	Gabriel Álvez		(substituted off) 52'
FW	9	Marcelo Zalayeta
Substitutions:
FW	19	Diego Alonso		(substituted on) 52'
MF	6	Gianni Guigou		(substituted on) 65'
MF	20	Christian Callejas		(substituted on) 81'
Manager:
Víctor Púa

GK	1	Marcelo Ramírez	(yellow card) 90+'
DF	2	Raúl Palacios	(yellow card) 63'
DF	6	Pedro Reyes
DF	3	Miguel Ramírez
DF	13	Jorge Vargas
MF	8	Clarence Acuña
MF	16	Mauricio Aros	(yellow card) 68'
MF	20	Fabián Estay	(yellow card) 55'
MF	10	José Luis Sierra		(substituted off) 73'
FW	9	Iván Zamorano	(yellow card) 74'	(substituted off) 89'
FW	11	Marcelo Salas
Substitutions:
FW	22	David Pizarro		(substituted on) 73'
FW	18	Pedro González		(substituted on) 89'
Manager:
(Uruguay) Nelson Acosta

=== Mexico v Brazil ===
14 July 1999
20:35

Mexico	0–2	Brazil
	Report	Amoroso 25'; Rivaldo 43'

Estadio Antonio Oddone Sarubbi, Ciudad del Este
Attendance: 28,000
Referee: Byron Moreno (Ecuador)

Mexico	Brazil

GK	1	Jorge Campos
DF	13	Pável Pardo
DF	4	Rafael Márquez
DF	2	Claudio Suárez
DF	18	Salvador Carmona
DF	14	Isaac Terrazas	(substituted off) 46'
MF	5	Gerardo Torrado
MF	17	Francisco Palencia	(substituted off) 55'
MF	19	Miguel Zepeda
FW	15	Luis Hernández
FW	10	Cuauhtémoc Blanco
Substitutions:
MF	7	Ramón Ramírez	(substituted on) 46'
MF	11	Daniel Osorno	(substituted on) 55'
Manager:
Manuel Lapuente

GK	1	Dida
DF	2	Cafu
DF	15	João Carlos
DF	4	Antônio Carlos
DF	6	Roberto Carlos
MF	18	Flávio Conceição	(substituted off) 78'
MF	5	Emerson
MF	10	Rivaldo
MF	22	Zé Roberto
FW	7	Márcio Amoroso	(substituted off) 80'
FW	9	Ronaldo	(substituted off) 75'
Substitutions:
FW	21	Ronaldinho	(substituted on) 75'
MF	19	Beto	(substituted on) 78'
MF	11	Alex	(substituted on) 80'
Manager:
Vanderlei Luxemburgo

== Third-place match ==
17 July 1999
15:05

Chile	1–2	Mexico
Palacios 80'	Report	Palencia 26'; Zepeda 87'

Estadio Defensores del Chaco, Asunción
Attendance: 12,000
Referee: Horacio Elizondo (Argentina)

Chile	Mexico

GK	1	Marcelo Ramírez
DF	2	Raúl Palacios	(yellow card) 90'
DF	3	Miguel Ramírez		(substituted off) 37'
DF	6	Pedro Reyes
DF	13	Jorge Vargas		(substituted off) 61'
MF	8	Clarence Acuña
MF	16	Mauricio Aros
MF	20	Fabián Estay
MF	10	José Luis Sierra
FW	9	Iván Zamorano
FW	18	Pedro González		(substituted off) 61'
Substitutions:
DF	21	Pablo Contreras		(substituted on) 37'
FW	17	Claudio Núñez		(substituted on) 61'
MF	19	Esteban Valencia		(substituted on) 61'
Manager:
(Uruguay) Nelson Acosta

GK	1	Jorge Campos
DF	4	Rafael Márquez	(yellow card) 90'
DF	2	Claudio Suárez
DF	18	Salvador Carmona
MF	19	Miguel Zepeda
MF	5	Gerardo Torrado
MF	7	Ramón Ramírez
MF	20	Rafael García		(substituted off) 61'
FW	17	Francisco Palencia		(substituted off) 66'
FW	15	Luis Hernández	(yellow card) 90'
FW	10	Cuauhtémoc Blanco		(substituted off) 85'
Substitutions:
MF	8	Alberto García Aspe	(yellow card) 69'	(substituted on) 61'
DF	14	Isaac Terrazas		(substituted on) 66'
DF	13	Pável Pardo		(substituted on) 85'
Manager:
Manuel Lapuente

== Final ==
18 July 1999
17:05

Uruguay	0–3	Brazil
	Report	Rivaldo 20', 26'; Ronaldo 48'

Estadio Defensores del Chaco, Asunción
Attendance: 43,000
Referee: Óscar Ruiz (Colombia)

Uruguay	Brazil

GK	1	Fabián Carini
DF	17	Martín del Campo
DF	3	Fernando Picun
DF	14	Alejandro Lembo
DF	22	Federico Bergara		(substituted off) 73'
MF	7	Fabián Coelho		(substituted off) 57'
MF	5	Andrés Fleurquin
MF	8	Líber Vespa	(yellow card) 19'	(substituted off) 46'
MF	20	Christian Callejas	(yellow card) 12'
FW	10	Federico Magallanes
FW	9	Marcelo Zalayeta
Substitutions:
FW	21	Antonio Pacheco		(substituted on) 46'
FW	11	Gabriel Álvez		(substituted on) 57'
MF	6	Gianni Guigou	(yellow card) 89'	(substituted on) 73'
Manager:
Víctor Púa

GK	1	Dida
DF	2	Cafu
DF	15	João Carlos	(yellow card) 24'
DF	4	Antônio Carlos
DF	6	Roberto Carlos
MF	18	Flávio Conceição	(yellow card) 15'
MF	5	Emerson
MF	10	Rivaldo
MF	22	Zé Roberto
FW	7	Márcio Amoroso
FW	9	Ronaldo
Manager:
Vanderlei Luxemburgo
