= List of Copa América penalty shoot-outs =

This is a list of all penalty shoot-outs that have occurred in the Copa América.

== Complete list ==
Key

- (penalty scored) = scored penalty
- gold background = scored penalty which ended the shoot-out
- (penalty missed) = missed penalty
- pink background = missed penalty which ended the shoot-out
- silver background = first penalty in the shoot-out
- horizontal line within a list of takers = beginning of the sudden death stage

Penalty shoot-outs in the Copa América
| # | Winners | F | Losers | Penalties | | | Winning team | | Losing team | | Edition | Round | Date & Venue |
| # | Winners | F | Losers | S | M | T | GK | Takers | Takers | GK | Edition | Round | Date & Venue |
|---|---|---|---|---|---|---|---|---|---|---|---|---|---|
| 1 | Colombia | 1–1 | Uruguay | 5–3 | 0–1 | 5–4 | Córdoba | Asprilla (penalty scored); Mendoza (penalty scored); Valderrama (penalty scored); W. Pérez (penalty scored); Valencia (penalty scored) | (penalty scored) Pelletti; (penalty scored) Saralegui; (penalty missed) Moas; (penalty scored) Siboldi | Siboldi | 1993 Ecuador | Quarter-finals | 26 June, Estadio Monumental, Guayaquil |
| 2 | Argentina | 1–1 | Brazil | 6–5 | 0–1 | 6–6 | Goycochea | Gorosito (penalty scored); Simeone (penalty scored); Rodríguez (penalty scored); Acosta (penalty scored); Medina (penalty scored) Borelli (penalty scored) | (penalty scored) Zinho; (penalty scored) Cafu; (penalty scored) Müller; (penalty scored) Roberto Carlos; (penalty scored) Luisinho (penalty missed) Boiadeiro | Zetti | 1993 Ecuador | Quarter-finals | 27 June, Estadio Monumental, Guayaquil |
| 3 | Argentina | 0–0 | Colombia | 6–5 | 0–1 | 6–6 | Goycochea | Gorosito (penalty scored); Batistuta (penalty scored); Simeone (penalty scored); Rodríguez (penalty scored); Acosta (penalty scored) Borelli (penalty scored) | (penalty scored) Rincón; (penalty scored) Asprilla; (penalty scored) Mendoza; (penalty scored) W. Pérez; (penalty scored) Valderrama (penalty missed) Aristizábal | Córdoba | 1993 Ecuador | Semi-finals | 1 July, Estadio Monumental, Guayaquil |
| 4 | Colombia | 1–1 | Paraguay | 5–4 | 0–1 | 5–5 | Higuita | Rincón (penalty scored); Mendoza (penalty scored); Arboleda (penalty scored); Cabrera (penalty scored); Asprilla (penalty scored) | (penalty scored) Jara; (penalty scored) Acuña; (penalty scored) Samaniego; (penalty scored) Denis; (penalty missed) Gamarra | Battaglia | 1995 Uruguay | Quarter-finals | 16 July, Estadio Centenario, Montevideo |
| 5 | United States | 0–0 | Mexico | 4–1 | 0–2 | 4–3 | Friedel | Wynalda (penalty scored); Moore (penalty scored); Caligiuri (penalty scored); Klopas (penalty scored) | (penalty scored) L. García; (penalty missed) Hermosillo; (penalty missed) Coyote | Campos | 1995 Uruguay | Quarter-finals | 17 July, Estadio Parque Artigas, Paysandú |
| 6 | Brazil | 2–2 | Argentina | 4–2 | 1–2 | 5–4 | Taffarel | Roberto Carlos (penalty scored); Túlio (penalty scored); Cruz (penalty missed); Dunga (penalty scored); Edmundo (penalty scored) | (penalty scored) Pérez; (penalty scored) Acosta; (penalty missed) Simeone; (penalty missed) Fabbri | Cristante | 1995 Uruguay | Quarter-finals | 17 July, Estadio Atilio Paiva Olivera, Rivera |
| 7 | Uruguay | 1–1 | Brazil | 5–3 | 0–1 | 5–4 | Álvez | Francescoli (penalty scored); Bengoechea (penalty scored); Herrera (penalty scored); Á. Gutiérrez (penalty scored); Martínez (penalty scored) | (penalty scored) Roberto Carlos; (penalty scored) Zinho; (penalty missed) Túlio; (penalty scored) Dunga | Taffarel | 1995 Uruguay | Final | 23 July, Estadio Centenario, Montevideo |
| 8 | Mexico | 1–1 | Ecuador | 4–3 | 2–3 | 6–6 | Ríos | Hernández (penalty scored); Suárez (penalty scored); Blanco (penalty missed); Chávez (penalty scored); Villa (penalty missed) Sánchez (penalty scored) | (penalty scored) Montaño; (penalty missed) Capurro; (penalty missed) De la Cruz; (penalty scored) Graziani; (penalty scored) Fernández (penalty missed) Rosero | Ibarra | 1997 Bolivia | Quarter-finals | 22 June, Estadio Félix Capriles, Cochabamba |
| 9 | Mexico | 3–3 | Peru | 4–2 | 0–2 | 4–4 | Campos | Suárez (penalty scored); Terrazas (penalty scored); R. García (penalty scored); Zepeda (penalty scored) | (penalty scored) Solano; (penalty scored) Jor. Soto; (penalty missed) Jos. Soto; (penalty missed) Reynoso | Ibáñez | 1999 Paraguay | Quarter-finals | 10 July, Estadio Defensores del Chaco, Asunción |
| 10 | Uruguay | 1–1 | Paraguay | 5–3 | 0–1 | 5–4 | Carini | Fleurquin (penalty scored); Guigou (penalty scored); Alonso (penalty scored); Zalayeta (penalty scored); Magallanes (penalty scored) | (penalty scored) Acuña; (penalty scored) Gamarra; (penalty scored) Enciso; (penalty missed) Benítez | Tavarelli | 1999 Paraguay | Quarter-finals | 10 July, Estadio Defensores del Chaco, Asunción |
| 11 | Uruguay | 1–1 | Chile | 5–3 | 0–1 | 5–4 | Carini | Del Campo (penalty scored); Guigou (penalty scored); Alonso (penalty scored); Zalayeta (penalty scored); Magallanes (penalty scored) | (penalty scored) J. Vargas; (penalty missed) Aros; (penalty scored) Pizarro; (penalty scored) Reyes | Ramírez | 1999 Paraguay | Semi-finals | 13 July, Estadio Defensores del Chaco, Asunción |
| 12 | Honduras | 2–2 | Uruguay | 5–4 | 0–1 | 5–5 | Enamorado | Pineda (penalty scored); Martínez (penalty scored); García (penalty scored); Medina (penalty scored); Izaguirre (penalty scored) | (penalty scored) Sorondo; (penalty missed) C. Gutiérrez; (penalty scored) J. Rodríguez; (penalty scored) Lemos; (penalty scored) Olivera | Berbia | 2001 Colombia | Third place play-off | 28 July, Estadio El Campín, Bogotá |
| 13 | Brazil | 1–1 | Uruguay | 5–3 | 0–1 | 5–4 | Júlio César | Luisão (penalty scored); Luís Fabiano (penalty scored); Adriano (penalty scored); Renato (penalty scored); Alex (penalty scored) | (penalty scored) Silva; (penalty scored) Viera; (penalty scored) Pouso; (penalty missed) Sánchez | Viera | 2004 Peru | Semi-finals | 21 July, Estadio Nacional, Lima |
| 14 | Brazil | 2–2 | Argentina | 4–2 | 0–2 | 4–4 | Júlio César | Adriano (penalty scored); Edu (penalty scored); Diego (penalty scored); Juan (penalty scored) | (penalty missed) D'Alessandro; (penalty missed) Heinze; (penalty scored) González; (penalty scored) Sorín | Abbondanzieri | 2004 Peru | Final | 25 July, Estadio Nacional, Lima |
| 15 | Brazil | 2–2 | Uruguay | 5–4 | 2–3 | 7–7 | Doni | Robinho (penalty scored); Juan (penalty scored); Gilberto Silva (penalty scored); Alves (penalty missed); Diego (penalty scored) Menegazzo (penalty missed); Gilberto (penalty scored) | (penalty missed) Forlán; (penalty scored) Scotti; (penalty scored) González; (penalty scored) C. Rodríguez; (penalty scored) Abreu (penalty missed) García; (penalty missed) Lugano | Carini | 2007 Venezuela | Semi-finals | 10 July, Estadio José Pachencho Romero, Maracaibo |
| 16 | Uruguay | 1–1 aet | Argentina | 5–4 | 0–1 | 5–5 | Muslera | Forlán (penalty scored); Suárez (penalty scored); Scotti (penalty scored); Gargano (penalty scored); Cáceres (penalty scored) | (penalty scored) Messi; (penalty scored) Burdisso; (penalty missed) Tevez; (penalty scored) Pastore; (penalty scored) Higuaín | Romero | 2011 Argentina | Quarter-finals | 16 July, Estadio Brigadier General Estanislao López, Santa Fe |
| 17 | Paraguay | 0–0 aet | Brazil | 2–0 | 1–4 | 3–4 | Villar | Barreto (penalty missed); Estigarribia (penalty scored); Riveros (penalty scored) | (penalty missed) Elano; (penalty missed) Thiago Silva; (penalty missed) André Santos; (penalty missed) Fred | Júlio César | 2011 Argentina | Quarter-finals | 17 July, Estadio Ciudad de La Plata, La Plata |
| 18 | Paraguay | 0–0 aet | Venezuela | 5–3 | 0–1 | 5–4 | Villar | Ortigoza (penalty scored); Barrios (penalty scored); Riveros (penalty scored); O. Martínez (penalty scored); Verón (penalty scored) | (penalty scored) Maldonado; (penalty scored) Rey; (penalty missed) Lucena; (penalty scored) Miku | Vega | 2011 Argentina | Semi-finals | 20 July, Estadio Malvinas Argentinas, Mendoza |
| 19 | Argentina | 0–0 | Colombia | 5–4 | 2–3 | 7–7 | Romero | Messi (penalty scored); Garay (penalty scored); Banega (penalty scored); Lavezzi (penalty scored); Biglia (penalty missed) Rojo (penalty missed); Tevez (penalty scored) | (penalty scored) Rodríguez; (penalty scored) Falcao; (penalty scored) Cuadrado; (penalty missed) Muriel; (penalty scored) Cardona (penalty missed) Zúñiga; (penalty missed) Murillo | Ospina | 2015 Chile | Quarter-finals | 26 June, Estadio Sausalito, Viña del Mar |
| 20 | Paraguay | 1–1 | Brazil | 4–3 | 1–2 | 5–5 | Villar | O. Martínez (penalty scored); Cáceres (penalty scored); Bobadilla (penalty scored); Santa Cruz (penalty missed); González (penalty scored) | (penalty scored) Fernandinho; (penalty missed) Ribeiro; (penalty scored) Miranda; (penalty missed) Costa; (penalty scored) Coutinho | Jefferson | 2015 Chile | Quarter-finals | 27 June, Estadio Ester Roa, Concepción |
| 21 | Chile | 0–0 aet | Argentina | 4–1 | 0–2 | 4–3 | Bravo | Fernández (penalty scored); Vidal (penalty scored); Aránguiz (penalty scored); Sánchez (penalty scored) | (penalty scored) Messi; (penalty missed) Higuaín; (penalty missed) Banega | Romero | 2015 Chile | Final | 4 July, Estadio Ester Roa, Concepción |
| 22 | Colombia | 0–0 | Peru | 4–2 | 0–2 | 4–4 | Ospina | Rodríguez (penalty scored); Cuadrado (penalty scored); Moreno (penalty scored); S. Pérez (penalty scored) | (penalty scored) Ruidíaz; (penalty scored) Tapia; (penalty missed) Trauco; (penalty missed) Cueva | Gallese | 2016 United States | Quarter-finals | 17 June, MetLife Stadium, East Rutherford |
| 23 | Chile | 0–0 aet | Argentina | 4–2 | 1–2 | 5–4 | Bravo | Vidal (penalty missed); Castillo (penalty scored); Aránguiz (penalty scored); Beausejour (penalty scored); Silva (penalty scored) | (penalty missed) Messi; (penalty scored) Mascherano; (penalty scored) Agüero; (penalty missed) Biglia | Romero | 2016 United States | Final | 26 June, MetLife Stadium, East Rutherford |
| 24 | Brazil | 0–0 | Paraguay | 4–3 | 1–2 | 5–5 | Alisson | Willian (penalty scored); Marquinhos (penalty scored); Coutinho (penalty scored); Firmino (penalty missed); Gabriel Jesus (penalty scored) | (penalty missed) Gómez; (penalty scored) Almirón; (penalty scored) Valdez; (penalty scored) Rojas; (penalty missed) González | Fernández | 2019 Brazil | Quarter-finals | 27 June, Arena do Grêmio, Porto Alegre |
| 25 | Chile | 0–0 | Colombia | 5–4 | 0–1 | 5–5 | Arias | Vidal (penalty scored); E. Vargas (penalty scored); Pulgar (penalty scored); Aránguiz (penalty scored); Sánchez (penalty scored) | (penalty scored) Rodríguez; (penalty scored) Cardona; (penalty scored) Cuadrado; (penalty scored) Mina; (penalty missed) Tesillo | Ospina | 2019 Brazil | Quarter-finals | 28 June, Arena Corinthians, São Paulo |
| 26 | Peru | 0–0 | Uruguay | 5–4 | 0–1 | 5–5 | Gallese | Guerrero (penalty scored); Ruidíaz (penalty scored); Yotún (penalty scored); Advíncula (penalty scored); Flores (penalty scored) | (penalty missed) Suárez; (penalty scored) Cavani; (penalty scored) Stuani; (penalty scored) Bentancur; (penalty scored) Torreira | Muslera | 2019 Brazil | Quarter-finals | 29 June, Itaipava Arena Fonte Nova, Salvador |
| 27 | Peru | 3–3 | Paraguay | 4–3 | 2–3 | 6–6 | Gallese | Lapadula (penalty scored); Yotún (penalty scored); Ormeño (penalty missed); Tapia (penalty scored); Cueva (penalty missed) Trauco (penalty scored) | (penalty scored) Án. Romero; (penalty scored) Alonso; (penalty missed) D. Martínez; (penalty missed) Samudio; (penalty scored) Piris Da Motta (penalty missed) Espínola | Silva | 2021 Brazil | Quarter-finals | 2 July, Estádio Olímpico Pedro Ludovico, Goiânia |
| 28 | Colombia | 0–0 | Uruguay | 4–2 | 0–2 | 4–4 | Ospina | Zapata (penalty scored); Sánchez (penalty scored); Mina (penalty scored); Borja (penalty scored) | (penalty scored) Cavani; (penalty missed) Giménez; (penalty scored) Suárez; (penalty missed) Viña | Muslera | 2021 Brazil | Quarter-finals | 3 July, Estádio Nacional Mané Garrincha, Brasília |
| 29 | Argentina | 1–1 | Colombia | 3–2 | 1–3 | 4–5 | E. Martínez | Messi (penalty scored); De Paul (penalty missed); Paredes (penalty scored); La. Martínez (penalty scored) | (penalty scored) Cuadrado; (penalty missed) Sánchez; (penalty missed) Mina; (penalty scored) Borja; (penalty missed) Cardona | Ospina | 2021 Brazil | Semi-finals | 6 July, Estádio Nacional Mané Garrincha, Brasília |
| 30 | Argentina | 1–1 | Ecuador | 4–2 | 1–2 | 5–4 | E. Martínez | Messi (penalty missed); Álvarez (penalty scored); Mac Allister (penalty scored); Montiel (penalty scored); Otamendi (penalty scored) | (penalty missed) Mena; (penalty missed) Minda; (penalty scored) Yeboah; (penalty scored) J. Caicedo | Domínguez | 2024 United States | Quarter-finals | 4 July, NRG Stadium, Houston |
| 31 | Canada | 1–1 | Venezuela | 4–3 | 2–3 | 6–6 | Crépeau | David (penalty scored); Millar (penalty missed); Bombito (penalty scored); Eustáquio (penalty missed); Davies (penalty scored) Koné (penalty scored) | (penalty scored) Rondón; (penalty missed) Herrera; (penalty scored) Rincón; (penalty missed) Savarino; (penalty scored) Cádiz (penalty missed) Ángel | Romo | 2024 United States | Quarter-finals | 5 July, AT&T Stadium, Arlington |
| 32 | Uruguay | 0–0 | Brazil | 4–2 | 1–2 | 5–4 | Rochet | Valverde (penalty scored); Bentancur (penalty scored); De Arrascaeta (penalty scored); Giménez (penalty missed); Ugarte (penalty scored) | (penalty missed) Militão; (penalty scored) Pereira; (penalty missed) Douglas Luiz; (penalty scored) Martinelli | Alisson | 2024 United States | Quarter-finals | 6 July, Allegiant Stadium, Paradise |
| 33 | Uruguay | 2–2 | Canada | 4–3 | 0–2 | 4–5 | Rochet | Valverde (penalty scored); Bentancur (penalty scored); De Arrascaeta (penalty scored); Suárez (penalty scored) | (penalty scored) David; (penalty scored) Bombito; (penalty missed) Koné; (penalty scored) Choinière; (penalty missed) Davies | St. Clair | 2024 United States | Third place play-off | 13 July, Bank of America Stadium, Charlotte |

== Statistics ==
Key

- † = shoot-out in the final
- **Bold** = winners that year

=== Shoot-out records ===
Fewest shoot-outs in a tournament (since 1993)

- **1** – 1997, 2001, 2007

Most shoot-outs in a tournament

- **4** – 1995, 2024

Most played shoot-outs

- **4** – Brazil vs Uruguay (1995†, 2004, 2007, 2024)

Fewest penalties in a shoot-out

- **7** – Chile vs Argentina (2015†), Paraguay vs Brazil (2011), United States vs Mexico (1995)

Most penalties in a shoot-out

- **14** – Argentina vs Colombia (2015), Brazil vs Uruguay (2007)

Fewest penalties scored in a shoot-out

- **2** – Paraguay vs Brazil (2011)

Most penalties scored in a shoot-out

- **11** – Argentina vs Brazil (1993), Argentina vs Colombia (1993)

Most consecutive penalties scored in a shoot-out

- **11** – Argentina vs Brazil (1993), Argentina vs Colombia (1993)

Most penalties missed in a shoot-out

- **5** – Argentina vs Colombia (2015), Brazil vs Uruguay (2007), Canada vs Venezuela (2024), Mexico vs Ecuador (1997), Paraguay vs Brazil (2011), Peru vs Paraguay (2021)

Most consecutive penalties missed in a shoot-out

- **4** – Argentina vs Colombia (2015)

=== Team records ===
Most shoot-outs played

- **12** – Uruguay (1993, **1995**†, 1999×2, 2001, 2004, 2007, **2011**, 2019, 2021, 2024×2)

Most shoot-outs played in a tournament

- **2** – Argentina (**1993**, 2015†), Brazil (1995, **2004**†), Canada (2024), Colombia (1993, 2021), Paraguay (2011), Uruguay (1999, 2024)

Most shoot-out wins

- **6** – Uruguay (**1995**†, 1999×2, **2011**, 2024×2)

Most shoot-out wins in a tournament

- **2** – Argentina (**1993**), Brazil (**2004**†), Paraguay (2011), Uruguay (1999, 2024)

Most shoot-out losses

- **6** – Uruguay (1993, 2001, 2004, 2007, 2019, 2021)

Most consecutive shoot-out wins

- **3** – Brazil (**2004**†×2, **2007**), Chile (**2015**†, **2016**†, 2019), Paraguay (2011×2, 2015), Uruguay (**1995**†, 1999×2)

Most consecutive shoot-out losses

- **3** – Uruguay (2001, 2004, 2007)

Most shoot-out wins without losses

- **1** – Honduras (2001), United States (1995)

Most shoot-out losses without wins

- **2** – Ecuador (1997, 2024), Venezuela (2011, 2024)

Most knockout matches played without shoot-outs (since 1993)

- **5** – Bolivia (1995, 1997×3, 2015)

Fewest penalties scored in a shoot-out

- **0** – Brazil (2011)

Most penalties scored in a shoot-out

- **6** – Argentina (**1993**×2)

Most consecutive penalties scored in a shoot-out

- **6** – Argentina (**1993**×2)

Most penalties missed in a shoot-out

- **4** – Brazil (2011)

Most consecutive penalties missed in a shoot-out

- **4** – Brazil (2011)

=== Taker records ===
Most shoot-outs played

- **6** – (Argentina) Lionel Messi (2011, 2015†×2, 2016†, **2021**, **2024**)

Most penalties scored in shoot-outs

- **4** – (Argentina) Lionel Messi (2011, 2015†×2, **2021**), (Colombia) Juan Cuadrado (2015, 2016, 2019, 2021)

Most penalties missed in shoot-outs

- **2** – (Argentina) Lucas Biglia (2015, 2016†), (Argentina) Lionel Messi (2016†, **2024**), (Peru) Christian Cueva (2016, 2021)

Most final penalties scored in shoot-outs

- **2** – (Argentina) Jorge Borelli (**1993**×2), (Chile) Alexis Sánchez (**2015**†, 2019), (Uruguay) Federico Magallanes (1999×2)

=== Goalkeeper records ===
Most shoot-outs played

- **5** – (Colombia) David Ospina (2015, 2016, 2019, 2021×2)

Fewest penalties faced in shoot-outs

- **3** – (United States) Brad Friedel (1995)

Most penalties faced in shoot-outs

- **24** – (Colombia) David Ospina

Fewest penalties conceded in shoot-outs

- **1** – (United States) Brad Friedel

Most penalties conceded in shoot-outs

- **17** – (Argentina) Sergio Romero (2011, 2015†×2, 2016†), (Colombia) David Ospina

Most penalties missed against (saves and off-target shots) in shoot-outs

- **7** – (Colombia) David Ospina, (Paraguay) Justo Villar (2011×2, 2015)

Fewest penalties conceded in a shoot-out

- **0** – (Paraguay) Justo Villar (2011)

Most penalties conceded in a shoot-out

- **6** – (Brazil) Zetti (1993), (Colombia) Óscar Córdoba (1993)

Most penalties missed against (saves and off-target shots) in a shoot-out

- **4** – (Paraguay) Justo Villar (2011)

=== By team ===
Penalty shoot-out statistics by team
| Team | P | W | L | W % | Years won | Years lost | S | A | S % |
|---|---|---|---|---|---|---|---|---|---|
| Uruguay | 12 | 6 | 6 | 50% | **1995**†, 1999×2, **2011**, 2024×2 | 1993, 2001, 2004, 2007, 2019, 2021 | 48 | 58 | 83% |
| Argentina | 10 | 5 | 5 | 50% | **1993**×2, 2015, **2021**, **2024** | 1995, 2004†, 2011, 2015†, 2016† | 35 | 48 | 73% |
| Brazil | 10 | 5 | 5 | 50% | 1995, **2004**†×2, **2007**, **2019** | 1993, 1995, 2011, 2015, 2024 | 35 | 49 | 71% |
| Colombia | 8 | 4 | 4 | 50% | 1993, 1995, 2016, 2021 | 1993, 2015, 2019, 2021 | 33 | 41 | 80% |
| Paraguay | 7 | 3 | 4 | 43% | 2011×2, 2015 | 1995, 1999, 2019, 2021 | 24 | 33 | 73% |
| Chile | 4 | 3 | 1 | 75% | **2015**†, **2016**†, 2019 | 1999 | 16 | 18 | 89% |
| Peru | 4 | 2 | 2 | 50% | 2019, 2021 | 1999, 2016 | 13 | 19 | 68% |
| Mexico | 3 | 2 | 1 | 67% | 1997, 1999 | 1995 | 9 | 13 | 69% |
| Canada | 2 | 1 | 1 | 50% | 2024 | 2024 | 7 | 11 | 64% |
| Ecuador | 2 | 0 | 2 | 0% | – | 1997, 2024 | 5 | 10 | 50% |
| Venezuela | 2 | 0 | 2 | 0% | – | 2011, 2024 | 6 | 10 | 60% |
| Honduras | 1 | 1 | 0 | 100% | 2001 | – | 5 | 5 | 100% |
| United States | 1 | 1 | 0 | 100% | 1995 | – | 4 | 4 | 100% |

=== By tournament ===
From 1993 to 2007, if the score was level after 90 minutes, a penalty shoot-out followed immediately. In 2011, any knockout match (in 2015, 2016 and since 2021, only the final) might go into extra time. In 2019, immediate shoot-outs could be used in the quarter-finals only.

Penalty shoot-outs by tournament
| Year | Teams | Knockout matches | Shoot-outs | Penalty % | Penalties scored | Penalty attempts | Score % |
|---|---|---|---|---|---|---|---|
| 1993 | 12 | 8 | 3 | 37% | 30 | 33 | 91% |
| 1995 | 12 | 8 | 4 | 50% | 28 | 35 | 80% |
| 1997 | 12 | 8 | 1 | 12% | 7 | 12 | 58% |
| 1999 | 12 | 8 | 3 | 37% | 22 | 26 | 85% |
| 2001 | 12 | 8 | 1 | 12% | 9 | 10 | 90% |
| 2004 | 12 | 8 | 2 | 25% | 14 | 17 | 82% |
| 2007 | 12 | 8 | 1 | 12% | 9 | 14 | 64% |
| 2011 | 12 | 8 | 3 | 37% | 19 | 26 | 73% |
| 2015 | 12 | 8 | 3 | 37% | 21 | 31 | 68% |
| 2016 | 16 | 8 | 2 | 25% | 12 | 17 | 71% |
| 2019 | 12 | 8 | 3 | 37% | 25 | 30 | 83% |
| 2021 | 10 | 8 | 3 | 37% | 18 | 29 | 62% |
| 2024 | 16 | 8 | 4 | 50% | 26 | 39 | 67% |
| Total | | 104 | 33 | 32% | 240 | 319 | 75% |

== See also ==
- List of FIFA World Cup penalty shoot-outs
- List of UEFA European Championship penalty shoot-outs
