= 1999 Copa América Group B =

The Group B of the 1999 Copa América was one of the three groups of competing nations in the 1999 Copa América. It comprised Brazil, Chile, Venezuela, and Mexico. Group play began on June 30 and ended on July 6.

Brazil won the group and faced Argentina, the runner-up of Group C, in the quarterfinals. Mexico finished second and faced Peru, the runner-up of Group A, in the quarterfinals. Chile finished third and faced Colombia, the winner of Group C, in the quarterfinals. Venezuela finished fourth in the group and was eliminated from the tournament.

== Standings ==
Team	Pld	W	D	L	GF	GA	GD	Pts
Brazil	3	3	0	0	10	1	+9	9
Mexico	3	2	0	1	5	3	+2	6
Chile	3	1	0	2	3	2	+1	3
Venezuela	3	0	0	3	1	13	−12	0

Teams that advanced to the quarterfinals

- Group winners
- Group runners-up
- Best two third-placed teams among all groups

== Matches ==
=== Chile v Mexico ===
30 June 1999
18:35

Chile	0–1	Mexico
	Report	Hernández 59'

Estadio Antonio Oddone Sarubbi, Ciudad del Este
Attendance: 22,000
Referee: Horacio Elizondo (Argentina)

Chile	Mexico

GK	1	Marcelo Ramírez
DF	13	Jorge Vargas
DF	3	Miguel Ramírez
DF	4	Francisco Rojas
DF	6	Pedro Reyes	(yellow card) 21'
MF	7	Nelson Parraguez
MF	8	Clarence Acuña	(yellow card) 20'	(substituted off) 74'
MF	19	Esteban Valencia		(substituted off) 80'
FW	22	David Pizarro		(substituted off) 65'
FW	9	Iván Zamorano
FW	11	Marcelo Salas
Substitutions:
MF	20	Fabián Estay		(substituted on) 65'
FW	18	Pedro González		(substituted on) 74'
MF	2	Raúl Palacios		(substituted on) 80'
Manager:
(Uruguay) Nelson Acosta

GK	1	Jorge Campos
DF	13	Pável Pardo
DF	4	Rafael Márquez
DF	2	Claudio Suárez
DF	18	Salvador Carmona
MF	6	Raúl Lara
MF	19	Miguel Zepeda	(yellow card) 25'	(substituted off) 46'
MF	8	Alberto García Aspe		(substituted off) 78'
MF	7	Ramón Ramírez	(yellow card) 74'
FW	15	Luis Hernández
FW	10	Cuauhtémoc Blanco		(substituted off) 80'
Substitutions:
FW	17	Francisco Palencia		(substituted on) 46'
DF	3	Joel Sánchez		(substituted on) 78'
MF	9	Paulo Chávez		(substituted on) 80'
Manager:
Manuel Lapuente

=== Brazil v Venezuela ===
30 June 1999
20:35

Brazil	7–0	Venezuela
Ronaldo 28', 62'; Emerson 40'; Amoroso 54', 81'; Ronaldinho 74'; Rivaldo 82'	Report

Estadio Antonio Oddone Sarubbi, Ciudad del Este
Attendance: 22,000
Referee: Bonifacio Núñez (Paraguay)

Brazil	Venezuela

GK	1	Dida
DF	2	Cafu	(yellow card) 27'	(substituted off) 77'
DF	3	Odvan
DF	4	Antônio Carlos
DF	6	Roberto Carlos		(substituted off) 75'
MF	5	Emerson	(yellow card) 69'
MF	8	Vampeta
MF	10	Rivaldo
MF	11	Alex		(substituted off) 70'
FW	7	Márcio Amoroso
FW	9	Ronaldo
Substitutions:
FW	21	Ronaldinho		(substituted on) 70'
DF	16	Serginho		(substituted on) 75'
DF	13	Evanílson		(substituted on) 77'
Manager:
Vanderlei Luxemburgo

GK	1	Renny Vega
DF	4	David McIntosh		(substituted off) 45'
DF	2	Rolando Álvarez
DF	6	José Manuel Rey
DF	3	Jorge Rojas
MF	8	Edson Tortolero
MF	21	José Vera	(yellow card) 31'	(substituted off) 65'
MF	5	Héctor Bidoglio
MF	10	Gabriel Urdaneta	(yellow card) 90'
FW	7	Daniel Noriega
FW	11	Félix Hernández	(yellow card) 40'	(substituted off) 60'
Substitutions:
MF	14	Leopoldo Jiménez		(substituted on) 45'
FW	22	Ruberth Morán		(substituted on) 60'
MF	16	José Duno		(substituted on) 65'
Manager:
(Argentina) José Omar Pastoriza

=== Brazil v Mexico ===
3 July 1999
15:05

Brazil	2–1	Mexico
Amoroso 20'; Alex 45'	Report	Terrazas 74'

Estadio Antonio Oddone Sarubbi, Ciudad del Este
Attendance: 22,000
Referee: Gustavo Méndez (Uruguay)

Brazil	Mexico

GK	1	Dida
DF	2	Cafu
DF	3	Odvan	(yellow card) 21'
DF	4	Antônio Carlos	(yellow card) 86'
DF	6	Roberto Carlos
MF	5	Emerson	(yellow card) 74'
MF	8	Vampeta
MF	11	Alex		(substituted off) 78'
FW	10	Rivaldo	(red card) 82'
FW	7	Márcio Amoroso		(substituted off) 80'
FW	9	Ronaldo		(substituted off) 90'
Substitutions:
MF	18	Flávio Conceição		(substituted on) 78'
FW	21	Ronaldinho		(substituted on) 80'
DF	15	João Carlos		(substituted on) 90'
Manager:
Vanderlei Luxemburgo

GK	1	Jorge Campos
DF	13	Pável Pardo
DF	2	Claudio Suárez
DF	3	Joel Sánchez
DF	18	Salvador Carmona
MF	9	Paulo Chávez		(substituted off) 46'
MF	6	Raúl Lara
MF	8	Alberto García Aspe	(yellow card) 14'	(substituted off) 46'
MF	20	Rafael García		(substituted off) 64'
FW	15	Luis Hernández
FW	10	Cuauhtémoc Blanco
Substitutions:
MF	5	Gerardo Torrado		(substituted on) 46'
DF	14	Isaac Terrazas		(substituted on) 46'
MF	11	Daniel Osorno		(substituted on) 64'
Manager:
Manuel Lapuente

=== Chile v Venezuela ===
3 July 1999
17:05

Chile	3–0	Venezuela
Zamorano 5'; Sierra 21'; Tortolero 66' (o.g.)	Report

Estadio Antonio Oddone Sarubbi, Ciudad del Este
Attendance: 22,000
Referee: Juan Luna (Bolivia)

Chile	Venezuela

GK	1	Marcelo Ramírez
DF	13	Jorge Vargas	(yellow card) (yellow-red card) 39'
DF	6	Pedro Reyes
DF	3	Miguel Ramírez
MF	2	Raúl Palacios
MF	8	Clarence Acuña
MF	16	Mauricio Aros
MF	20	Fabián Estay
MF	10	José Luis Sierra		(substituted off) 46'
FW	9	Iván Zamorano		(substituted off) 75'
FW	11	Marcelo Salas	(yellow card) 38' (red card) 69'
Substitutions:
MF	7	Nelson Parraguez		(substituted on) 46'
FW	18	Pedro González		(substituted on) 75'
Manager:
(Uruguay) Nelson Acosta

GK	1	Renny Vega
DF	14	Leopoldo Jiménez
DF	2	Rolando Álvarez	(red card) 18'
DF	6	José Manuel Rey	(yellow card) 40'
DF	17	Miguel Echenausi
MF	8	Edson Tortolero
MF	21	José Vera
MF	5	Héctor Bidoglio
MF	10	Gabriel Urdaneta		(substituted off) 60'
FW	22	Ruberth Morán		(substituted off) 55'
FW	7	Daniel Noriega
Substitutions:
FW	9	Juan García	(yellow card) 58'	(substituted on) 55'
FW	11	Félix Hernández		(substituted on) 60'
Manager:
(Argentina) José Omar Pastoriza

=== Mexico v Venezuela ===
6 July 1999
18:35

Mexico	3–1	Venezuela
Blanco 21', 39'; Osorno 29'	Report	Urdaneta 72'

Estadio Antonio Oddone Sarubbi, Ciudad del Este
Attendance: 18,000
Referee: Bonifacio Núñez (Paraguay)

Mexico	Venezuela

GK	22	Adolfo Ríos	(yellow card) 66'
DF	3	Joel Sánchez
DF	21	Sergio Almaguer	(yellow card) 14'	(substituted off) 46'
DF	9	Paulo Chávez		(substituted off) 63'
DF	18	Salvador Carmona
MF	20	Rafael García
MF	5	Gerardo Torrado	(yellow card) 3'	(substituted off) 46'
MF	6	Raúl Lara
MF	17	Francisco Palencia
FW	11	Daniel Osorno	(yellow card) 87'
FW	10	Cuauhtémoc Blanco	(red card) 83'
Substitutions:
DF	2	Claudio Suárez		(substituted on) 46'
MF	15	Salvador Cabrera		(substituted on) 46'
DF	14	Isaac Terrazas		(substituted on) 63'
Manager:
Manuel Lapuente

GK	12	Manuel Sanhouse
DF	5	Héctor Bidoglio
DF	6	José Manuel Rey
DF	14	Leopoldo Jiménez	(yellow card) 49'
DF	15	Miguel Mea Vitali
MF	16	José Duno		(substituted off) 58'
MF	17	Miguel Echenausi
MF	21	José Vera
MF	10	Gabriel Urdaneta
FW	22	Ruberth Morán		(substituted off) 77'
FW	7	Daniel Noriega		(substituted off) 62'
Substitutions:
MF	19	Juan Arango		(substituted on) 58'
FW	20	Cristian Cásseres		(substituted on) 62'
FW	9	Juan García		(substituted on) 77'
Manager:
(Argentina) José Omar Pastoriza

=== Brazil v Chile ===
6 July 1999
20:35

Brazil	1–0 (Note: Match stopped by referee after 85 minutes due to heavy fog and abandoned after few minutes of waiting, with score declared final.)	Chile
Ronaldo 36' (pen.)	Report

Estadio Antonio Oddone Sarubbi, Ciudad del Este
Attendance: 18,000
Referee: Horacio Elizondo (Argentina)

Brazil	Chile

GK	1	Dida
DF	13	Evanílson	(yellow card) 55'
DF	3	Odvan
DF	15	João Carlos
DF	6	Roberto Carlos
MF	18	Flávio Conceição
MF	8	Vampeta		(substituted off) 16'
MF	22	Zé Roberto
MF	11	Alex		(substituted off) 73'
FW	9	Ronaldo
FW	7	Márcio Amoroso		(substituted off) 46'
Substitutions:
MF	19	Beto		(substituted on) 16'
FW	21	Ronaldinho		(substituted on) 46'
FW	20	Christian	(yellow card) 76'	(substituted on) 73'
Manager:
Vanderlei Luxemburgo

GK	1	Marcelo Ramírez	(yellow card) 13'
DF	15	Moisés Villarroel		(substituted off) 70'
DF	21	Pablo Contreras	(yellow card) 33'
DF	3	Miguel Ramírez
DF	5	Javier Margas
MF	4	Francisco Rojas
MF	7	Nelson Parraguez		(substituted off) 46'
MF	14	Roberto Cartes
MF	10	José Luis Sierra	(yellow card) 71'
FW	9	Iván Zamorano	(yellow card) 33'	(substituted off) 46'
FW	18	Pedro González	(yellow card) 55'
Substitutions:
MF	2	Raúl Palacios		(substituted on) 46'
FW	17	Claudio Núñez		(substituted on) 46'
MF	16	Mauricio Aros		(substituted on) 70'
Manager:
(Uruguay) Nelson Acosta
