= 1999 Copa América final =

- Event: 1999 Copa América
Uruguay	Brazil
(Uruguay)	(Brazil)
0	3
- Date: 18 July 1999
- Venue: Estadio Defensores del Chaco, Asunción
- Referee: Óscar Ruiz (Colombia)
- Attendance: 30,000
- Weather: Overcast; 12 °C (54 °F)

The 1999 Copa América final was the final match of the 1999 Copa América. It was held on 18 July 1999, in Asunción. Brazil won the match against Uruguay 3–0, earning a sixth Copa América title.

== Match details ==
18 July 1999
17:10 (UTC-3)

Uruguay	0–3	Brazil
	Report	Rivaldo 20', 27'; Ronaldo 46'

Estadio Defensores del Chaco, Asunción
Attendance: 30,000
Referee: Óscar Ruiz (Colombia)

Uruguay	Brazil

GK	1	Fabián Carini
RB	17	Martín del Campo
CB	3	Fernando Picun
CB	14	Alejandro Lembo
LB	22	Federico Bergara		(substituted off) 74'
RM	7	Fabián Coelho		(substituted off) 56'
CM	5	Andrés Fleurquin
CM	8	Líber Vespa	(yellow card) 20'	(substituted off) 46'
LM	20	Christian Callejas	(yellow card) 12'
CF	10	Federico Magallanes (c)
CF	9	Marcelo Zalayeta
Substitutions:
FW	21	Antonio Pacheco		(substituted on) 46'
FW	11	Gabriel Álvez		(substituted on) 56'
MF	6	Gianni Guigou	(yellow card) 90'	(substituted on) 74'
Manager:
(Uruguay) Víctor Púa

GK	1	Dida
RB	2	Cafu (c)
CB	15	João Carlos	(yellow card) 25'
CB	4	Antônio Carlos
LB	6	Roberto Carlos
RM	18	Flávio Conceição	(yellow card) 16'
CM	5	Emerson
CM	10	Rivaldo
LM	22	Zé Roberto
CF	7	Márcio Amoroso
CF	9	Ronaldo
Manager:
(Brazil) Vanderlei Luxemburgo
