= 1999 Copa América Group A =

The Group A of the 1999 Copa América was one of the three groups of competing nations in the 1999 Copa América. It comprised Paraguay, Bolivia, Peru, and Japan. Group play began on June 29 and ended on July 5.

Paraguay won the group and faced Uruguay, the second-best third-placed finisher, in the quarterfinals. Peru finished second and faced Mexico—the runner-up of Group B—in the quarterfinals. Bolivia and Japan finished third and fourth in the group, respectively, and were eliminated from the tournament.

== Standings ==
Team	Pld	W	D	L	GF	GA	GD	Pts
Paraguay (H)	3	2	1	0	5	0	+5	7
Peru	3	2	0	1	4	3	+1	6
Bolivia	3	0	2	1	1	2	−1	2
Japan	3	0	1	2	3	8	−5	1

(H) Hosts

Teams that advanced to the quarterfinals

- Group winners
- Group runners-up
- Best two third-placed teams among all groups

All times are in local, Paraguay Time (UTC−03:00).

== Matches ==
=== Peru v Japan ===
29 June 1999
18:15

Peru	3–2	Japan
Jorge Soto 70'; Holsen 74', 81'	Report	Lopes 6'; Miura 77'

Estadio Defensores del Chaco, Asunción
Attendance: 38,000
Referee: Byron Moreno (Ecuador)

Peru	Japan

GK	1	Óscar Ibáñez
DF	6	José Soto
DF	3	Juan Reynoso	(yellow card) 6'
DF	2	Miguel Rebosio
MF	14	Jorge Soto
MF	15	José Pereda		(substituted off) 82'
MF	10	Roberto Palacios		(substituted off) 46'
MF	8	Juan Jayo	(yellow card) 71'
MF	7	Nolberto Solano
FW	9	Flavio Maestri		(substituted off) 82'
FW	18	Claudio Pizarro
Substitutions:
FW	17	Roberto Holsen		(substituted on) 46'
MF	19	Marko Ciurlizza		(substituted on) 82'
MF	13	Juan Velásquez		(substituted on) 82'
Manager:
Juan Carlos Oblitas

GK	20	Seigo Narazaki
DF	8	Shigeyoshi Mochizuki	(substituted off) 65'
DF	4	Masami Ihara
DF	5	Yutaka Akita
DF	6	Toshihiro Hattori
MF	15	Kazuaki Tasaka	(substituted off) 30'
MF	7	Teruyoshi Ito
MF	10	Hiroshi Nanami
MF	13	Toshiya Fujita
FW	11	Wagner Lopes	(substituted off) 73'
FW	12	Shoji Jo
Substitutions:
FW	22	Takashi Fukunishi	(substituted on) 30'
MF	19	Atsuhiro Miura	(substituted on) 65'
MF	16	Daisuke Oku	(substituted on) 73'
Manager:
(France) Philippe Troussier

=== Paraguay v Bolivia ===
29 June 1999
21:15

Paraguay	0–0	Bolivia
	Report

Estadio Defensores del Chaco, Asunción
Attendance: 43,000
Referee: Mario Sánchez (Chile)

Paraguay	Bolivia

GK	1	Ricardo Tavarelli
DF	2	Francisco Arce
DF	3	Celso Ayala	(yellow card) 77'
DF	4	Carlos Gamarra
DF	5	Delio Toledo
MF	6	Julio César Enciso
MF	7	Diego Gavilán
MF	8	Roberto Acuña
MF	18	Hugo Ovelar		(substituted off) 46'
FW	11	Roque Santa Cruz		(substituted off) 76'
FW	14	Nelson Cuevas		(substituted off) 46'
Substitutions:
FW	9	Miguel Ángel Benítez		(substituted on) 46'
FW	15	Mauro Caballero		(substituted on) 46'
MF	10	Guido Alvarenga		(substituted on) 76'
Manager:
Ever Almeida

GK	1	José Fernández
DF	20	Renny Ribera
DF	2	Juan Manuel Peña
DF	3	Marco Sandy	(yellow card) 65'
DF	19	Iván Castillo
DF	15	Luis Cristaldo
MF	16	Vladimir Soria
MF	8	Rubén Tufiño
MF	21	Erwin Sánchez		(substituted off) 79'
MF	7	Limberg Gutiérrez		(substituted off) 67'
FW	22	Víctor Hugo Antelo	(yellow card) 43'	(substituted off) 46'
Substitutions:
MF	10	Marco Etcheverry		(substituted on) 46'
FW	9	Jaime Moreno		(substituted on) 67'
FW	11	Milton Coimbra		(substituted on) 79'
Manager:
(Argentina) Héctor Veira

=== Peru v Bolivia ===
2 July 1999
19:05

Peru	1–0	Bolivia
Zúñiga 87'	Report

Estadio Defensores del Chaco, Asunción
Attendance: 30,000
Referee: Luis Solórzano (Venezuela)

Peru	Bolivia

GK	1	Óscar Ibáñez
DF	6	José Soto
DF	2	Miguel Rebosio
DF	3	Juan Reynoso
MF	14	Jorge Soto
MF	15	José Pereda
MF	10	Roberto Palacios
MF	8	Juan Jayo
MF	7	Nolberto Solano		(substituted off) 46'
FW	9	Flavio Maestri	(yellow card) 83'	(substituted off) 85'
FW	18	Claudio Pizarro		(substituted off) 57'
Substitutions:
MF	19	Marko Ciurlizza		(substituted on) 46'
FW	17	Roberto Holsen	(yellow card) 79'	(substituted on) 57'
MF	13	Ysrael Zúñiga	(red card) 90+2'	(substituted on) 85'
Manager:
Juan Carlos Oblitas

GK	1	José Fernández
DF	20	Renny Ribera
DF	2	Juan Manuel Peña
DF	3	Marco Sandy	(yellow card) 52'
DF	19	Iván Castillo
DF	15	Luis Cristaldo		(substituted off) 65'
MF	16	Vladimir Soria	(yellow card) 28'
MF	8	Rubén Tufiño	(yellow card) 90'
MF	21	Erwin Sánchez		(substituted off) 82'
MF	7	Limberg Gutiérrez		(substituted off) 61'
FW	9	Jaime Moreno
Substitutions:
MF	10	Marco Etcheverry		(substituted on) 61'
DF	6	Fernando Ochoaizpur		(substituted on) 65'
MF	13	Luis Liendo		(substituted on) 82'
Manager:
(Argentina) Héctor Veira

=== Paraguay v Japan ===
2 July 1999
21:05

Paraguay	4–0	Japan
Benítez 18', 62'; Santa Cruz 40', 86'	Report

Estadio Defensores del Chaco, Asunción
Attendance: 25,000
Referee: Benito Archundia (Mexico)

Paraguay	Japan

GK	1	Ricardo Tavarelli
DF	2	Francisco Arce
DF	3	Celso Ayala	(substituted off) 51'
DF	4	Carlos Gamarra
DF	5	Delio Toledo
MF	7	Diego Gavilán	(substituted off) 61'
MF	6	Julio César Enciso
MF	8	Roberto Acuña
MF	18	Hugo Ovelar	(substituted off) 76'
FW	11	Roque Santa Cruz
FW	9	Miguel Ángel Benítez
Substitutions:
DF	21	Denis Caniza	(substituted on) 51'
MF	17	Carlos Paredes	(substituted on) 61'
FW	14	Nelson Cuevas	(substituted on) 76'
Manager:
Ever Almeida

GK	1	Yoshikatsu Kawaguchi
DF	3	Naoki Soma
DF	2	Toshihide Saito	(yellow card) 74'
DF	7	Teruyoshi Ito
DF	5	Yutaka Akita
DF	17	Ryuzo Morioka
MF	18	Masahiro Ando
MF	10	Hiroshi Nanami		(substituted off) 58'
MF	22	Takashi Fukunishi		(substituted off) 24'
FW	11	Wagner Lopes
FW	12	Shoji Jo	(yellow card) 33'	(substituted off) 67'
Substitutions:
MF	19	Atsuhiro Miura		(substituted on) 24'
MF	13	Toshiya Fujita		(substituted on) 58'
FW	9	Kota Yoshihara		(substituted on) 67'
Manager:
(France) Philippe Troussier

=== Japan v Bolivia ===
5 July 1999
19:05

Japan	1–1	Bolivia
Lopes 75' (pen.)	Report	E. Sánchez 52'

Monumental Río Parapití, Pedro Juan Caballero
Attendance: 8,000
Referee: Byron Moreno (Ecuador)

Japan	Bolivia

GK	20	Seigo Narazaki
DF	17	Ryuzo Morioka	(yellow card) 74'
DF	4	Masami Ihara	(yellow card) (yellow-red card) 82'
DF	5	Yutaka Akita
DF	6	Toshihiro Hattori
MF	13	Toshiya Fujita		(substituted off) 64'
MF	8	Shigeyoshi Mochizuki
MF	10	Hiroshi Nanami		(substituted off) 70'
MF	7	Teruyoshi Ito
FW	11	Wagner Lopes
FW	21	Masayuki Okano		(substituted off) 63'
Substitutions:
FW	12	Shoji Jo		(substituted on) 63'
MF	16	Daisuke Oku		(substituted on) 64'
MF	19	Atsuhiro Miura		(substituted on) 70'
Manager:
(France) Philippe Troussier

GK	1	José Fernández
DF	20	Renny Ribera		(substituted off) 87'
DF	2	Juan Manuel Peña	(yellow card) 72'
DF	5	Óscar Sánchez	(red card) 44'
DF	19	Iván Castillo		(substituted off) 75'
DF	15	Luis Cristaldo
MF	8	Rubén Tufiño
MF	21	Erwin Sánchez
MF	7	Limberg Gutiérrez	(yellow card) 81'
FW	22	Víctor Hugo Antelo
FW	9	Jaime Moreno		(substituted off) 46'
Substitutions:
MF	10	Marco Etcheverry		(substituted on) 75'
DF	6	Fernando Ochoaizpur		(substituted on) 87'
DF	18	Gustavo Quinteros		(substituted on) 46'
Manager:
(Argentina) Héctor Veira

=== Paraguay v Peru ===
5 July 1999
21:05

Paraguay	1–0	Peru
Santa Cruz 88'	Report

Monumental Río Parapití, Pedro Juan Caballero
Attendance: 8,000
Referee: Óscar Ruiz (Colombia)

Paraguay	Peru

GK	1	Ricardo Tavarelli
DF	2	Francisco Arce	(yellow card) 52'
DF	21	Denis Caniza
DF	4	Carlos Gamarra
DF	5	Delio Toledo
MF	7	Diego Gavilán	(yellow card) 71'
MF	8	Roberto Acuña
MF	6	Julio César Enciso
MF	18	Hugo Ovelar		(substituted off) 46'
FW	9	Miguel Ángel Benítez		(substituted off) 70'
FW	11	Roque Santa Cruz
Substitutions:
MF	17	Carlos Paredes		(substituted on) 46'
FW	15	Mauro Caballero		(substituted on) 70'
Manager:
Ever Almeida

GK	1	Óscar Ibáñez
DF	5	Luis Guadalupe	(yellow card) 88'
DF	6	José Soto
DF	2	Miguel Rebosio
DF	4	Percy Olivares
MF	19	Marko Ciurlizza
MF	13	Juan Velásquez
MF	15	José Pereda		(substituted off) 82'
MF	10	Roberto Palacios	(yellow card) 53'	(substituted off) 68'
FW	18	Claudio Pizarro
FW	16	Andrés Mendoza
Substitutions:
FW	17	Roberto Holsen		(substituted on) 68'
MF	14	Jorge Soto		(substituted on) 82'
Manager:
Juan Carlos Oblitas
