= Clarence Acuña =

Chilean footballer (born 1975)

Personal information
- Full name: Clarence Williams Acuña Donoso
- Date of birth: 8 February 1975 (age 51)
- Place of birth: Rancagua, Chile
- Height: 1.75 m (5 ft 9 in)
- Position: Central midfielder

Senior career*
Years	Team	Apps	(Gls)
1994–1996	O'Higgins	81	(8)
1997–2000	Universidad de Chile	97	(12)
2000–2003	Newcastle United	46	(6)
2003–2005	Rosario Central	12	(0)
2005	Palestino	11	(2)
2006–2009	Unión Española	67	(5)
2007	→ Deportes Concepción (loan)	8	(0)
2010	Deportes La Serena	13	(1)
Total		335	(34)

International career
1995–2004	Chile	60	(3)

Managerial career
- 2016–2018: Al-Ittihad (assistant)
- 2018: Shabab Al-Ahli (assistant)
- * Club domestic league appearances and goals

Clárence Williams Acuña Donoso (born 8 February 1975 in Rancagua) is a Chilean former professional footballer who played as a midfielder.

== Club career ==
=== Chilean league ===
He started his career at Chilean club O'Higgins, whom he began playing for in 1994 at the age of nineteen. He played at O'Higgins until 1996, scoring eight goals in eighty-one games.

He then caught the eye of professional club Universidad de Chile. They signed him, and he played ninety games for them between 1997 and 1999, again scoring eight goals.

=== Newcastle United ===
After impressive domestic and international performances, Acuña was attracting attention from many big clubs. He eventually signed for Newcastle United, after manager Bobby Robson beat off competition from Manchester United and Parma to clinch Acuña's signature, earning him a £900,000 move to Newcastle United in October 2000, after receiving a work permit.

He made his debut for Newcastle on Saturday 28 October 2000 in a 1-0 away defeat to West Ham United. Two months later he scored his first goal for the club and the winner in the 2-1 victory against Leeds United. The goal was later voted "Goal of the Week" by the BBC. He was at Newcastle for four seasons, playing forty-six league games (including eleven as substitute), scoring six times. His contract was terminated by mutual consent in October 2003 so he could return home to care for his mother.

== International career ==
His performances in the Copa Banco Estado attracted the attention of the national team and he was given his first international cap in 1995. Acuña managed to keep up his good form and was included in the Chile World Cup squad for the 1998 event held in France. Here, he impressed players and pundits alike and helped his country to the last 16 stage of the tournament, where they bowed out in a 4-1 defeat to favourites Brazil. Acuña was seen as one of the breakthrough players of the tournament and he also had his first experience of playing in Europe, which would prove not to be his last.

A year later he was involved in another international tournament. This time his services were required in the Copa América. He started four games as Chile reached the semi-finals but were knocked out 5-3 on penalties against Uruguay after a 1-1 draw. They also lost the third place playoff 2-1 against Mexico four days later.

== Managerial career ==
Following his retirement as footballer, Acuña joined O'Higgins as sports advisory and, later, technical manager.

From 2015 to 2016, he worked as technical manager of Coquimbo Unido.

From 2016 to 2018, he and his fellow Pedro Reyes worked as assistant coaches of José Luis Sierra in Al-Ittihad and Shabab Al-Ahli.

In 2019, he joined CONMEBOL as head of technical development of the program Evolución Conmebol.

== Honours ==
Universidad de Chile

- Primera División de Chile: 1999, 2000
- Copa Chile: 1998, 2000
