= Fernando Picun =

Uruguayan footballer (born 1972)

Fernando Picún
Personal information
- Full name: Fernando Álvaro Picún de León
- Date of birth: February 14, 1972 (age 54)
- Place of birth: Montevideo, Uruguay
- Height: 1.85 m (6 ft 1 in)
- Position: Defender

Senior career*
Years	Team	Apps	(Gls)
1993–1996	River Plate		
1996–1998	Feyenoord	36	(3)
1998–1999	Defensor Sporting Club		
1999–2000	Urawa Reds	33	(1)
2001	Danubio		

International career^{‡}
1996–1999	Uruguay	9	(0)
- * Club domestic league appearances and goals as of 2 December 2006 ‡ National team caps and goals as of 2 December 2006

Fernando Álvaro Picún de León (born 14 February 1972) is a retired Uruguayan football player. He was a defender. He played for the Uruguay national team at 1999 Copa América in Paraguay.

== Club statistics ==
Club performance			League	
Season	Club	League	Apps	Goals
Netherlands			League	
1996/97	Feyenoord	Eredivisie	14	1
1997/98	Feyenoord	Eredivisie	22	2
Japan			League	
1999	Urawa Reds	J1 League	4	0
2000	Urawa Reds	J2 League	29	1
Country	Netherlands		36	3
Country	Japan		33	1
Total			69	4

== National team statistics ==
Uruguay national team
Year	Apps	Goals
1996	2	0
1997	0	0
1998	0	0
1999	7	0
Total	9	0

== Honours ==
=== National team ===
- Uruguay
  - 1999 Copa América: 2nd place
