= Federico Bergara =

Uruguayan footballer (born 1971)

Personal information
- Full name: Raúl Federico Bergara Pintos
- Date of birth: December 29, 1971 (age 54)
- Place of birth: Montevideo, Uruguay
- Height: 1.74 m (5 ft 9 in)
- Position: Defender

Senior career*
Years	Team	Apps	(Gls)
1988	Rampla Juniors		
1989	Fútbol Universitario		
1990–1992	Racing Club de Montevideo		
1993	Peñarol		
1994–1997	Racing Club de Montevideo		
1998–2000	Nacional	70	(1)
2001–2002	Estudiantes de La Plata	28	(0)
2003–2004	Racing Club de Montevideo		

International career
1999	Uruguay	8	(0)
- * Club domestic league appearances and goals

Raúl Federico Bergara (born December 29, 1971, in Montevideo) is a former Uruguayan footballer.

== Club career ==
Bergara played for Estudiantes de La Plata in the Primera División de Argentina.

== International career ==
Bergara made eight appearances for the senior Uruguay national football team during 1999, including six matches at the Copa América 1999.

== Palmares ==
Titulos Nacionales
Titulos	Club	Pais	Año
Campeonato Uruguayo	Peñarol	Uruguay	1993
Torneo Apertura	Nacional	Uruguay	1998
Torneo Clausura	Nacional	Uruguay	1998
Campeonato Uruguayo	Nacional	Uruguay	1998
Torneo Apertura	Nacional	Uruguay	1999
Torneo Apertura	Nacional	Uruguay	2000
Campeonato Uruguayo	Nacional	Uruguay	2000
