= Fabián Coelho =

Uruguayan footballer (born 1977)

Personal information
- Full name: Walter Fabián Coelho Alves
- Date of birth: 20 January 1977 (age 49)
- Place of birth: Artigas, Uruguay
- Height: 1.82 m (6 ft 0 in)
- Position: Midfielder

Team information
- Current team: Central Español

Senior career*
Years	Team	Apps	(Gls)
1996–2006	Nacional de Montevideo	202	(15)
2006	Miramar Misiones	11	(0)
2007–2008	Elche CF	45	(2)
2008–	Central Español	50	(7)

International career
1997–2001	Uruguay	20	(0)
- * Club domestic league appearances and goals

Walter Fabián Coelho Alves (born 20 January 1977) is a Uruguayan former association footballer who last played for Central Español.

Coelho was born in Artigas, near the Brazil border and the furthest city from the capital, Montevideo.

== Honours ==
=== International ===
- Uruguay
- 1999 Copa América: Runner-up 1999
- FIFA U-20 World Cup: Runner-up 1997
