= Raúl Palacios =

Chilean footballer (born 1976)

Personal information
- Full name: Raúl Alejandro Palacios Gamboa
- Date of birth: 30 October 1976 (age 50)
- Place of birth: Los Andes, Chile
- Height: 1.69 m (5 ft 7 in)
- Position: Central midfielder

Youth career
- Colo-Colo

Senior career*
Years	Team	Apps	(Gls)
1994–2000	Colo-Colo	26	(5)
1996	→ Unión San Felipe (loan)	32	(5)
1997	→ Everton (loan)		
1998–1999	→ Santiago Morning (loan)	20	(0)
2001	Santiago Morning	22	(3)
2001	Racing de Ferrol	11	(3)
2002	Unión Española	17	(1)
2002	Colorado Rapids	16	(0)
2003	Santiago Morning	16	(2)
2003–2004	Coquimbo Unido	53	(3)
2005–2006	Deportes La Serena	61	(10)
2007	Deportes Antofagasta	20	(3)
2007–2009	Coquimbo Unido	7	(0)
2009	San Marcos	1	(0)

International career
1999–2003	Chile	14	(2)
2001	Chile B	1	(0)
- * Club domestic league appearances and goals

Raúl Alejandro Palacios Gamboa (born 30 October 1976) is a Chilean former professional footballer who played as a midfielder.

== Career ==
Palacios played in several teams, in- and outside Chile.

At international level, Palacios was a member of the Chilean squad at the 1999 Copa América, where the team finished in fourth place. In addition, he made an appearance for Chile B in the friendly match against Catalonia on 28 December 2001.

== Honours ==
Colo-Colo

- Copa Chile: 1994

Chile

- Copa Ciudad de Valparaíso: 2000
