= Marcelo Zalayeta =

Uruguayan footballer (born 1978)

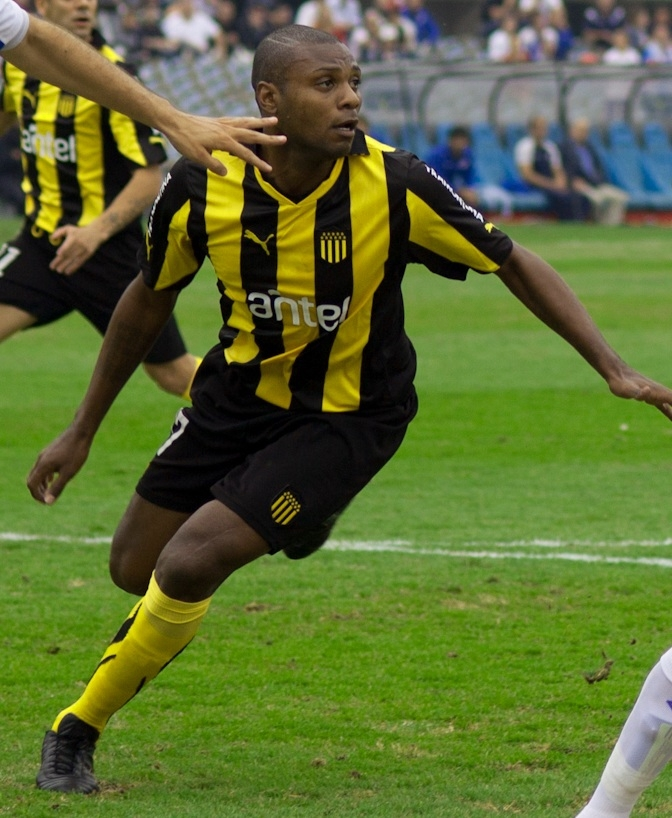
- Zalayeta playing for Peñarol in 2012

Personal information
- Full name: Marcelo Danubio Zalayeta
- Date of birth: 5 December 1978 (age 47)
- Place of birth: Montevideo, Uruguay
- Height: 1.88 m (6 ft 2 in)
- Position: Striker

Youth career
- Danubio

Senior career*
Years	Team	Apps	(Gls)
1996	Danubio	32	(12)
1997	Peñarol	32	(13)
1997–2007	Juventus	101	(16)
1998–1999	→ Empoli (loan)	17	(2)
1999–2001	→ Sevilla (loan)	50	(10)
2004	→ Perugia (loan)	5	(0)
2007–2010	Napoli	49	(12)
2009–2010	→ Bologna (loan)	29	(4)
2010–2011	Kayserispor	14	(7)
2011–2016	Peñarol	125	(48)
Total		454	(124)

International career
1997–2005	Uruguay	32	(10)
- * Club domestic league appearances and goals

Marcelo Danubio Zalayeta ([maɾˈselo salaˈʝeta]; born 5 December 1978) is a Uruguayan former professional footballer who played as a striker. At international level, Zalayeta represented the Uruguay national team on 32 occasions between 1997 and 2005, scoring ten goals. At youth level, he was a member of the team that finished second in the 1997 FIFA World Youth Championship. At senior level, he helped Uruguay reach the 1999 Copa América final.

Zalayeta began his club career with Danubio before moving to Peñarol for a season in 1997, where he won the Uruguayan Primera División and the Uruguayan Liguilla Cup. Later that year, he was acquired by Italian club Juventus, where he remained for ten seasons, winning three Serie A titles and reaching the 2003 UEFA Champions League Final, although he was sent on several loan spells with Empoli, Spanish side Sevilla, and Perugia during his time at the Turin club due to heavy competition from other strikers in the team's line-up.

Zalayeta moved to Napoli in 2007, where he remained for three more seasons, aside from a loan spell with Bologna during the 2009–10 season. After his time in Italy, he later spent a season with Turkish side Kayserispor, before returning to his home nation to play for Peñarol once again, winning the Uruguayan Primera División for a second time in 2013, before retiring in 2016.

== Club career ==
Zalayeta started his career with Danubio and then moving to Peñarol in Uruguay in 1997, where he made a name for himself, winning the Uruguayan Primera División and the Uruguayan Liguilla Cup. He moved to Juventus later that year. Although he was considered a promising young player at the time, he was not given much of a chance to prove himself due to heavy competition from several other prominent forwards at the club; however, he scored a decisive goal on his Serie A debut on 14 March 1998, in a 2–2 home draw against Napoli; Juventus would finish the season as league champions.

Zalayeta spent a season on loan with Empoli, and he also starred in Uruguay's surge for the Copa América in 1999, who lost in the final to Brazil. Two more years away from the club followed, and he played for Spanish side Sevilla until 2001. At last, when it seemed Juve lacked forwards, he was brought back to Italy at the start of the 2001–02 season, but he was loaned out to Perugia in 2004 before returning to Juventus in the same year.

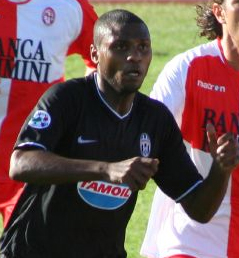
Zalayeta in Juventus' first Serie B game against Rimini in 2006

Although he did not play many matches with Juventus, Zalayeta performed well when given a chance, with high scoring percentage if calculated in relation to the minutes played and winning three Serie A titles (1998, 2002, 2003), two Supercoppa Italiana medals (2002 and 2003), and a Serie B title in 2007, also helping the club to the 2002 Coppa Italia final. During his time at the club, he was given the nickname "Panteron".

Zalayeta scored two very important extra-time winners against Spanish opposition upon his return to Juventus. One came in 2003 in the quarter-finals of UEFA Champions League against Barcelona, the other against Real Madrid in the 2005 round of 16. In the 2003 UEFA Champions League final, Zalayeta was one of the three Juventus players to have their penalty kick saved by Milan goalkeeper Dida in the shootout after a 0–0 draw, as Milan won the title.

After a decade with Juventus, Zalayeta moved to Napoli in the summer of 2007. Napoli paid €1.4 million for half of the rights (co-ownership). He played 49 Serie A matches and scored 12 goals in 2 seasons. At the start of 2009–10 season, he became surplus to the team and was not offered a shirt number. On 21 August 2009, he joined Bologna on loan for the 2009–10 season.

On 1 July 2010, Zalayeta returned to Napoli but failed to enter first team. He left for Turkish side Kayserispor on a two-year contract on 25 August. Zalayeta joined his former Uruguayan side Peñarol as a free agent on 17 July 2011; he won the Uruguayan Primera División for a second time in 2013 before retiring in 2016.

== International career ==
Zalayeta was called up for the 1997 FIFA World Youth Championship in Malaysia with the Uruguay national under-20 team, scoring four goals throughout the tournament as his team reached the final, and was defeated by Argentina. With the senior Uruguay national team, he took part at the 1997 FIFA Confederations Cup, in which Uruguay managed a fourth-place finish, and the 1999 Copa América, scoring three goals in five appearances in the latter tournament, as they reached the final of the competition, only to be defeated by Brazil.

Zalayeta represented Uruguay during his country's campaign to qualify for the 2006 FIFA World Cup, notably scoring a hat-trick in a 3–2 home win over Colombia on 4 September 2005. He was selected in a 23-man squad for Uruguay's 2006 FIFA World Cup qualification play-off against Australia on 16 November. Zalayeta was one of two penalty kick takers whose shots were saved by Australian goalkeeper Mark Schwarzer. Zalayeta's failure to convert culminated in Australia winning the play-off 4–2 on penalties, qualifying for the 2006 FIFA World Cup finals in Germany, and eliminating Uruguay in the process. This was his final appearance for Uruguay. In total, he made 32 appearances for the national team between 1997 and 2005, scoring ten goals.

== Style of play ==
A tall and physically strong forward, with a slender build, Zalayeta usually played as a centre-forward, and was primarily known for his technical skills and touch on the ball, as well as his eye for goal, heading, and ability in the air, which enabled him both to score and assist goals with his head; however, despite being a quick player in his youth, he was also known for his lack of pace as his career progressed. A team player, he was also known for his work-rate, ability to link-up with teammates, and hold up the ball with his back to goal, and was often involved in the build-up of attacking plays; he also possessed good movement, which enabled him to find spaces and get on the end of his teammates passes. Regarded as a promising but undisciplined player in his youth, he later developed into a more mature and reserved player as his career progressed, and was known for his tendency to score decisive goals for his teams, especially after coming off the bench, in particular during his time with Juventus, despite his lack of playing time with the club. He also had a strong personality, and was known for his exuberant goal celebrations with his arms lowered. He was nicknamed il panterone ("The Big Panther" in Italian) in the media throughout his career due to his movements and agility.

== Personal life ==
Zalayeta is the uncle of footballer Gonzalo Carneiro. In December 1999, Zalayeta and compatriot Sevilla teammates Nicolás Olivera and Marcelo Otero were charged for assaulting a man. Having struck a plea bargain, they paid €3,600 fines in March 2002 instead of facing a maximum eight-year sentence.

== Career statistics ==
=== International ===
Appearances and goals by national team and year
National team	Year	Apps	Goals
Uruguay	1997	4	1
Uruguay	1998	1	1
Uruguay	1999	10	4
Uruguay	2000	3	0
Uruguay	2001	3	1
Uruguay	2003	1	0
Uruguay	2004	1	0
Uruguay	2005	9	3
Total		32	10

Scores and results list Uruguay's goal tally first, score column indicates score after each Zalayeta goal.

List of international goals scored by Marcelo Zalayeta
No.	Date	Venue	Opponent	Score	Result	Competition	Ref.
1	15 December 1997	King Fahd International Stadium, Riyadh, Saudi Arabia	Czech Republic	2–0	2–1	1997 FIFA Confederations Cup	
2	24 May 1998	Estadio Nacional, Santiago, Chile	Chile	2–2	2–2	Friendly	
3	4 July 1999	Estadio Feliciano Cáceres, Luque, Paraguay	Ecuador	1–0	2–1	1999 Copa América	
4	4 July 1999	Estadio Feliciano Cáceres, Luque, Paraguay	Ecuador	2–0	2–1	1999 Copa América	
5	10 July 1999	Estadio Defensores del Chaco, Asunción, Paraguay	Paraguay	1–1	1–1 (5-3 p)	1999 Copa América	
6	8 September 1999	Estadio Centenario, Montevideo, Uruguay	Venezuela	2–0	2–0	Friendly	
7	28 February 2001	Bonifika Stadium, Koper, Slovenia	Slovenia	2–0	2–0	Friendly	
8	4 September 2005	Estadio Centenario, Montevideo, Uruguay	Colombia	1–0	3–2	2006 FIFA World Cup qualification	
9	4 September 2005	Estadio Centenario, Montevideo, Uruguay	Colombia	2–0	3–2	2006 FIFA World Cup qualification	
10	4 September 2005	Estadio Centenario, Montevideo, Uruguay	Colombia	3–2	3–2	2006 FIFA World Cup qualification	

== Honours ==
Juventus

- Serie A: 1997–98, 2001–02, 2002–03
- Serie B: 2006–07
- Supercoppa Italiana: 2002, 2003

Peñarol

- Uruguayan First Division Championship: 1997, 2012–13
- Uruguayan Liguilla Cup: 1997

Uruguay

- FIFA World Youth Championship runner-up: 1997
- Copa América runner-up: 1999
