= Antonio Aranda Stadium =

Stadium in Ciudad del Este, Paraguay

Coordinates: 25°31′37″S 54°36′43″W

Estadio Antonio Aranda
- Estadio del "3"
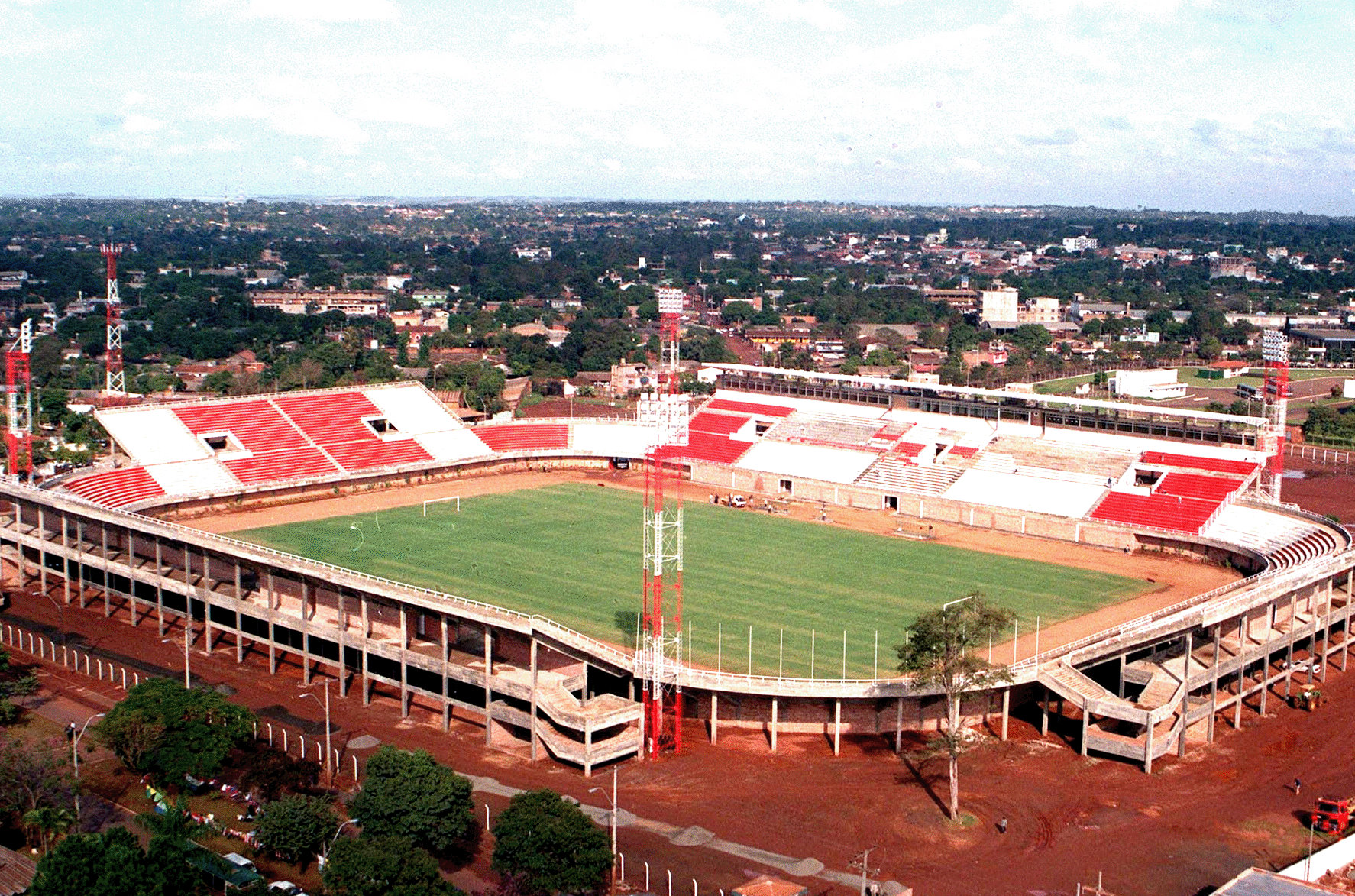
- Interactive map of Estadio Antonio Aranda
- Full name: Estadio Antonio Aranda
- Location: Ciudad del Este, Paraguay
- Owner: Club Atlético 3 de Febrero
- Capacity: 28,000
- Surface: Grass
- Field size: 100 x 66 m

Construction
- Built: 1972
- Opened: 1973, 1999 (after renovation)
- Architect: Tonino Cascio

Tenants
- Club Atlético 3 de Febrero; Paraguay national football team (selected matches)

The Antonio Aranda Stadium (Spanish: Estadio Antonio Aranda), known until 2013 as Estadio Tte. Cnel. Antonio Oddone Sarubbi, is a football stadium in the city of Ciudad del Este, Paraguay. It is the home venue of Club Atlético 3 de Febrero and is named after Antonio Aranda Encina, a former club executive who contributed to the stadium's construction through his enterprise Eventos y Construcciones, and also to 3 de Febrero's first promotion to the first division in 2004.

== History ==
The stadium is located next to Ciudad del Este's bus terminal. The stadium is on the Avenue General Bernardino Caballero, and was opened in 1973. The capacity of the stadium, is 28,000. It has a grass surface and was renovated in 1999, for which it was utilized as one of the venues of the 1999 Copa América, hosting games by Brazil, Mexico, Argentina and Chile national teams. Fixtures of the 2004 South American U-16 Championship and the 2007 South American U-20 Championship were also disputed at the stadium. The stadium is Paraguay's third largest, according to its seating capacity.

The stadium was the venue which saw Paraguayan footballers, Roque Santa Cruz score his first international goal for the Albirroja on 17 June 1999 in a friendly match against Uruguay, and Nelson Haedo score his first international goal for the Albirroja on 17 August 2005 in a friendly match against El Salvador.

== Gallery ==
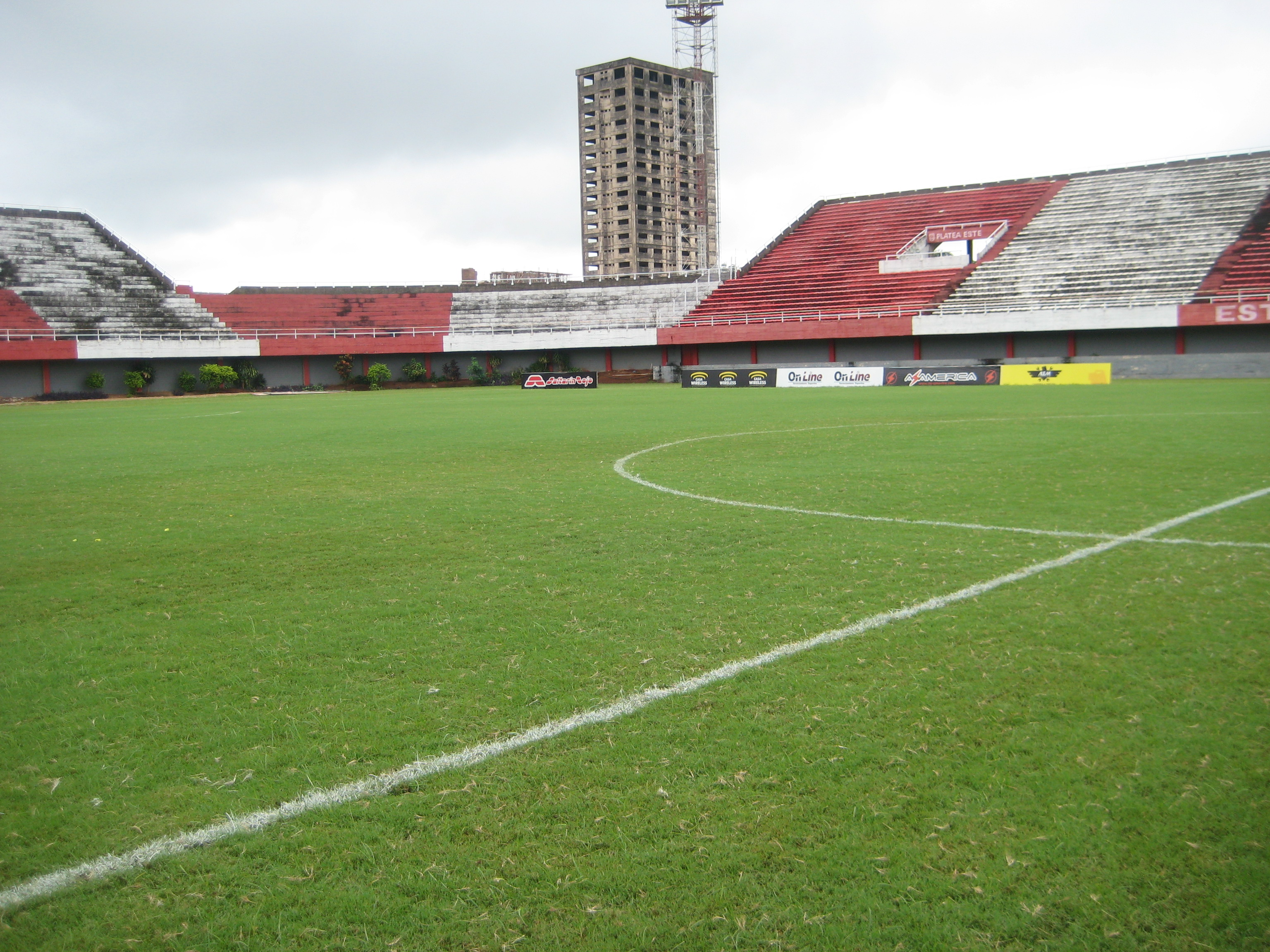
Interior of the stadium in 2017

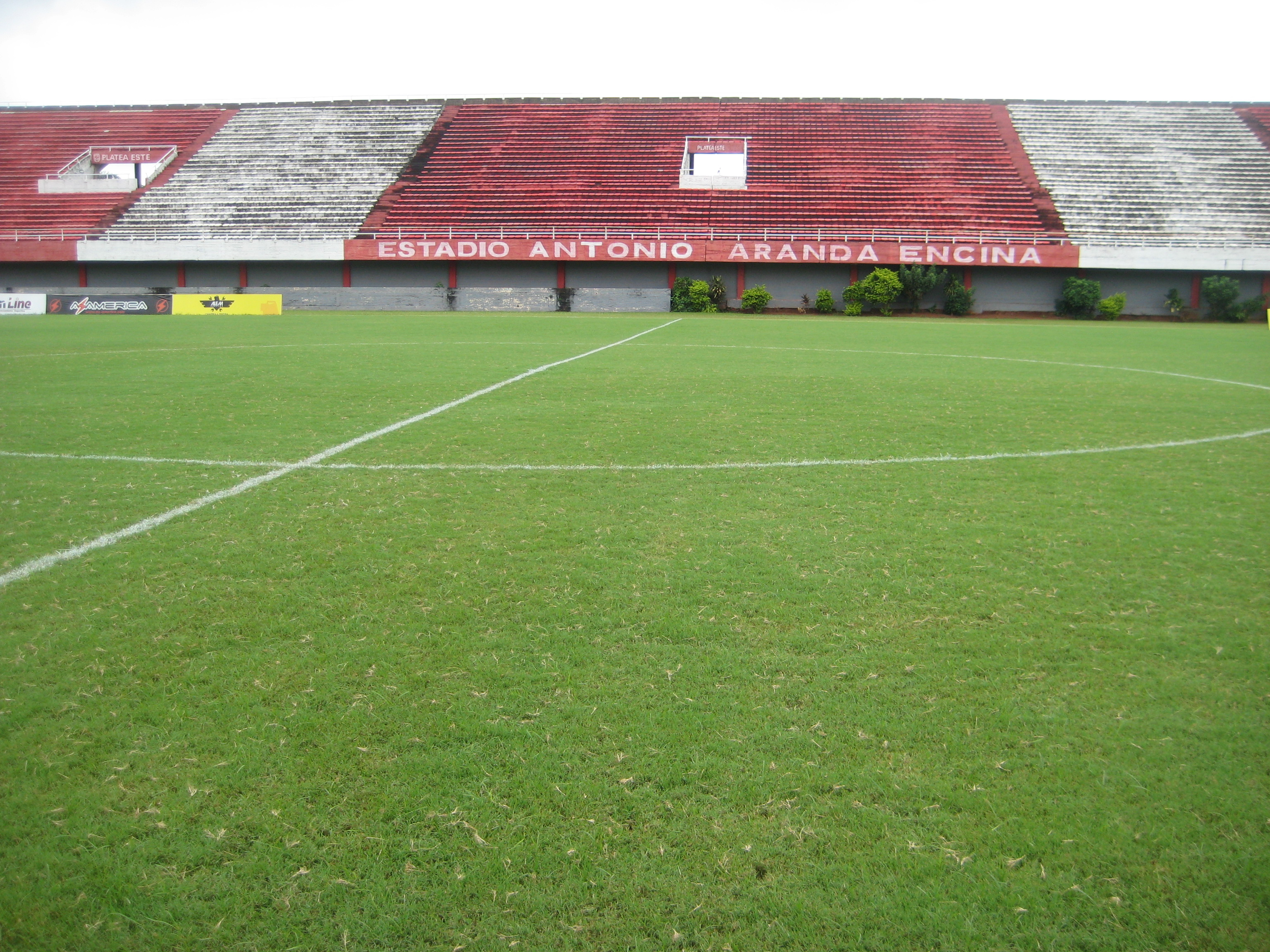
Interior of the stadium in 2017

== See also ==
- List of association football stadiums by capacity
- Club Atletico 3 de Febrero
