= Mauricio Aros =

Chilean footballer (born 1976)

Personal information
- Full name: Mauricio Fernando Aros Bahamonde
- Date of birth: 9 March 1976 (age 50)
- Place of birth: Punta Arenas, Chile
- Height: 1.75 m (5 ft 9 in)
- Position: Left-back

Youth career
- Deportes Concepción

Senior career*
Years	Team	Apps	(Gls)
1995–1997	Deportes Concepción	63	(3)
1998–2001	Universidad de Chile	103	(3)
2001–2002	Feyenoord	5	(0)
2002–2003	Maccabi Tel Aviv	15	(0)
2003–2004	Al-Hilal	–	(–)
2004	Huachipato	15	(1)
2005–2006	Cobreloa	60	(5)
2007–2009	U. de Concepción	44	(7)
2010	O'Higgins	32	(6)
2011–2012	Unión Temuco	58	(6)
Total		395	(31)

International career
1998–2004	Chile	30	(0)
- * Club domestic league appearances and goals

Mauricio Fernando Aros Bahamonde (born 9 March 1976) is a Chilean former professional footballer who played as a left-back.

== Club career ==
Aros began his career in the youth squads of Deportes Concepción and debuted as a professional in 1995. In 1998, Aros left the club for Universidad de Chile and won two Primera División Chilean Championships and two Copa Chile trophies with the club.

In 2001, he signed for Dutch club Feyenoord. He won the 2001–02 UEFA Cup with the club, as an unused substitute in the final, but did not receive regular playing time. In 2002, Aros was loaned to Israeli club Maccabi Tel Aviv and in 2003 he was loaned to Saudi club Al-Hilal.

In the middle of 2004, Aros contract expired and he returned to Chile to play for Huachipato. He then moved to Cobreloa for two years.

In the Clausura 2007 tournament, Universidad de Concepción made the finals of the playoffs and lost to Colo-Colo.

== International career ==
Aros made his international debut for the Chile national team on 29 April 1998 against Lithuania. He was a participant at the 1998 FIFA World Cup with Chile. He only played in one game at the '98 World Cup, which was in the Round of 16 match versus Brazil. Aros participated in three Copa América's (1999, 2001, and 2004). In the 1999 Copa América, Chile made it to the semifinals against Uruguay. The game went to penalties and Aros missed the second penalty shot, which would prove to be the decisive penalty for Chile. Chile went on to lose the third place game versus Mexico. His last international match was against Costa Rica on 14 July 2004 in a group match of the 2004 Copa América. Aros finished his international career with 30 caps.

== Personal life ==
Mauricio is the father of the footballer Joaquín Aros.

Frequently related to the also footballer Vicente Aros, Mauricio is not his father according to Vicente himself.

== Honours ==
Universidad de Chile

- Primera División de Chile: 1999, 2000
- Copa Chile: 1998, 2000

Feyenoord

- UEFA Cup: 2002

Universidad de Concepción

- Copa Chile: 2008
