= Fabián Carini =

Uruguayan footballer (born 1979)

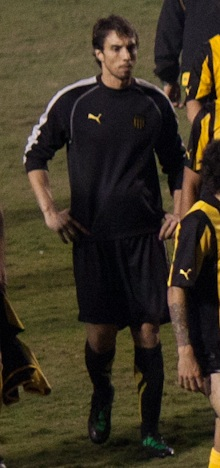
- Carini with Peñarol in 2011

Personal information
- Full name: Héctor Fabián Carini Hernández
- Date of birth: 26 December 1979 (age 46)
- Place of birth: Montevideo, Uruguay
- Height: 1.90 m (6 ft 3 in)
- Position: Goalkeeper

Senior career*
Years	Team	Apps	(Gls)
1997–2000	Danubio	39	(1)
2001–2004	Juventus	8	(0)
2002–2004	→ Standard Liège (loan)	61	(1)
2004–2007	Inter Milan	4	(0)
2005–2006	→ Cagliari (loan)	8	(0)
2007–2009	Murcia	13	(0)
2009–2010	Atlético Mineiro	18	(0)
2011–2012	Peñarol	24	(0)
2013	Deportivo Quito	39	(0)
2014–2017	Juventud	69	(2)
Total		257	(4)

International career
1999–2009	Uruguay	74	(0)
- * Club domestic league appearances and goals

Héctor Fabián Carini Hernández (born 26 December 1979) is a Uruguayan former professional footballer who played as a goalkeeper.

He played three seasons at Uruguayan club Danubio before signing for Italian club Juventus in 2001. During his three seasons at Juventus, he was a backup goalkeeper to Gianluigi Buffon and spent two years on loan at Standard Liège. He signed with Inter in 2004, where he was a backup keeper. After two seasons with La Liga club Murcia, he returned to South America and would play for Atlético Mineiro, Peñarol, Deportivo Quito, and Juventud.

He earned 74 caps for the Uruguay national team and represented the team at the 1999 and 2007 editions of the Copa América, as well as the 2002 World Cup.

== Club career ==
Carini played for Uruguayan club Danubio for three seasons, before signing with Italian club Juventus in January 2001, where he spent two seasons and was used mainly as a substitute goalkeeper. In March 2002, he was handed a start against Arsenal in the UEFA Champions League due to Juventus rotating their squad, having already qualified for the next round of the competition. He played well and saved a Thierry Henry penalty as Juventus won 1–0. Although Juventus finished the 2001–02 season as Serie A champions, Carini did not play in the league, as he served as the team's back-up goalkeeper behind Gianluigi Buffon; however, he was the team's starting goalkeeper in the Coppa Italia, ahead of Michelangelo Rampulla, where the team reached the final, only to lose out to Parma. Shortly afterwards during the summer of 2002, he nearly completed a loan move to Arsenal, but at the last minute, the move fell through due to the player's wage demands. He moved instead to Standard Liège, where he spent two years on loan.

In 2004, Carini left Juventus for Inter Milan, when he was exchanged for Fabio Cannavaro in a transfer which was worth €10 million. Despite being the first choice goalkeeper for his country, Carini was the third choice goalkeeper for Inter. After spending the 2005–06 season on loan at Cagliari, he went back to Inter, where he became the fourth goalkeeper behind Francesco Toldo, Júlio César and Paolo Orlandoni. Carini did not see a single minute of action over the next two years, a period during which Inter won the Serie A title in 2007. Before the 2007–08 season, he moved to newly promoted Spanish club Murcia to compete with incumbent first-choice goalkeeper Antonio Notario. He signed a three-year deal with the Brazilian club Atlético Mineiro in 2008, arriving on a free transfer. Atlético Mineiro rescinded Fabián Carini's contract in 2010; as a result, they had to a penalty to him, as his contract with the club ran until 2011.

After his experience at Atletico Mineiro, the 31-year-old goalkeeper Fabian Carini signed a one-season deal with Peñarol in December of that year.

He later played for Deportivo Quito in 2013, and signed with Juventud de Las Piedras in 2014. When his contract with the latter club expired at the end of 2016, Carini decided to retire from professional football, due to chronic lumbar pain, despite having an offer to play in the Copa Libertadores with Montevideo Wanderers.

== International career ==
Carini played for the Uruguay national team, which he represented at the 1999 and 2007 editions of the Copa América – earning second and fourth–place finishes respectively – as well as the 2002 FIFA World Cup, where his nation suffered a first–round elimination. Carini made his debut for the national squad on 17 June 1999 in a friendly match (2–3 win) in Ciudad del Este against Paraguay. In total, he obtained 74 caps between 1999 and 2009.

== Career statistics ==
Appearances and goals by national team and year
National team	Year	Apps	Goals
Uruguay	1999	10	0
Uruguay	2000	10	0
Uruguay	2001	10	0
Uruguay	2002	8	0
Uruguay	2003	1	0
Uruguay	2005	6	0
Uruguay	2006	10	0
Uruguay	2007	13	0
Uruguay	2008	5	0
Uruguay	2009	1	0
Total		74	0

== Honours ==
Juventus

- Serie A: 2001–02

Inter Milan

- Serie A: 2006–07
- Supercoppa Italiana: 2006
- Coppa Italia: 2004–05

Uruguay

- Copa América runner-up: 1999
