= Jorge Soto (footballer) =

Peruvian footballer (born 1971)

Personal information
- Full name: Jorge Antonio Soto Gómez
- Date of birth: 27 October 1971 (age 55)
- Place of birth: Lima, Peru
- Height: 1.78 m (5 ft 10 in)
- Position: Midfielder

Team information
- Current team: Sporting Cristal (assistant manager)

Senior career*
Years	Team	Apps	(Gls)
1990–1992	Deportivo Municipal	42	(6)
1993–1999	Sporting Cristal	229	(61)
1999	Lanús	15	(3)
2000	Flamengo	0	(0)
2000–2003	Sporting Cristal	123	(54)
2003	San Luis	12	(0)
2004–2007	Sporting Cristal	132	(37)
2008	Alianza Lima	7	(0)
2008	Melgar	16	(2)
Total		576	(163)

International career
1992–2005	Peru	101	(9)

Managerial career
- 2017–: Sporting Cristal (assistant)
- 2020: Sporting Cristal (interim)
- 2025: Sporting Cristal (interim)
- * Club domestic league appearances and goals

Jorge Antonio Soto Gómez (born 27 October 1971) is a Peruvian former professional footballer who played as a midfielder. He is the current assistant manager of Sporting Cristal.

Soto is the brother of footballers José Soto and Giancarlo Soto.

== Club career ==
Soto was born in Lima. Nicknamed "The Camel", he is one of the all-time emblematic figures of Sporting Cristal. He played over 500 games for his club and scored more than 170 goals, making him the highest goal scorer in the club's history.

== International career ==
Soto was capped regularly in the Peru national team from 1992 to 2005. He was also member of Peru's U-23 squad of 1992. Soto played in 101 official games for the Peruvian national team and scored 9 goals in official competition.

== Career statistics ==
Scores and results table. Peru's goal tally first:

List of international goals scored by Jorge Soto
No.	Date	Venue	Opponent	Score	Result	Competition
1	5 September 1993	Estadio Nacional, Lima, Peru	Paraguay	2–1	2–2	1994 FIFA World Cup qualification
2	6 July 1997	Estadio Nacional, Lima, Peru	Bolivia	2–0	2–1	1998 FIFA World Cup qualification
3	16 September 1997	Estadio Nacional, Lima, Peru	Paraguay	1–0	1–0	1998 FIFA World Cup qualification
4	23 June 1999	Estadio Alejandro Villanueva, Lima, Peru	Venezuela	2–0	3–0	Friendly
5	29 June 1999	Estadio Defensores del Chaco, Asunción, Paraguay	Japan	1–1	3–2	1999 Copa América
6	19 February 2000	Orange Bowl, Miami, United States	Honduras	2–0	5–3	2000 CONCACAF Gold Cup
7	23 February 2003	Estadio Alejandro Villanueva, Lima, Peru	Haiti	3–0	5–1	Friendly
8	6 September 2003	Estadio Nacional, Lima, Peru	Paraguay	3–1	4–1	2006 FIFA World Cup qualification
9	4 September 2004	Estadio Monumental "U", Lima, Peru	Argentina	1–1	1–3	2006 FIFA World Cup qualification

== Honours ==
Sporting Cristal

- Primera División Peruana (5): 1994, 1995, 1996, 2002, 2005

== See also ==
- List of men's footballers with 100 or more international caps
