= Isaac Terrazas =

Mexican footballer (born 1973)

Personal information
- Full name: Isaac Terrazas García
- Date of birth: 23 January 1973 (age 53)
- Place of birth: Mexico City, Mexico
- Height: 1.75 m (5 ft 9 in)
- Position: Defender

Senior career*
Years	Team	Apps	(Gls)
1991–2000	América	121	(15)
1994–1995	→ Gallos de Aguascalientes (loan)	34	(4)
2000–2002	Irapuato	43	(1)
2002–2005	Veracruz	81	(12)
Total		279	(33)

International career
1997–1999	Mexico	15	(2)
Medal record
Men's football
Representing Mexico
FIFA Confederations Cup
Winner	1999 Mexico
Copa América
Third place	1999 Paraguay
- * Club domestic league appearances and goals

Isaac Terrazas García (born 23 January 1973) is a Mexican former professional footballer who played as a defender.

He played for the Mexico national team and was a participant at the 1998 FIFA World Cup, as well as being in the Mexico squad that won the 1999 FIFA Confederations Cup.

== Career statistics ==
=== International goals ===
No.	Date	Venue	Opponent	Score	Result	Competition
1.	June 12, 1999	Seoul, South Korea	South Korea	1–1	Draw	1999 Korea Cup
2.	July 3, 1999	Ciudad del Este, Paraguay	Brazil	1–2	Loss	1999 Copa América

== Honours ==
América

- CONCACAF Champions' Cup: 1992

Mexico

- FIFA Confederations Cup: 1999
