= Andrés Fleurquin =

Uruguayan footballer (born 1975)

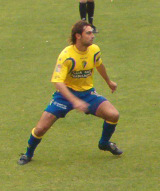
- Fleurquin playing for Cádiz

Personal information
- Full name: Andrés José Fleurquin Rubio
- Date of birth: 8 February 1975 (age 51)
- Place of birth: Montevideo, Uruguay
- Height: 1.86 m (6 ft 1 in)
- Position: Midfielder

Senior career*
Years	Team	Apps	(Gls)
1996–1999	Defensor	88	(15)
1999–2001	Sturm Graz	46	(2)
2002	Galatasaray	17	(2)
2002–2003	Rennes	11	(0)
2003–2004	Córdoba	27	(1)
2004–2010	Cádiz	175	(10)
2010–2015	Defensor	84	(1)
Total		448	(31)

International career
1997–2002	Uruguay	11	(0)
- * Club domestic league appearances and goals

Andrés José Fleurquin Rubio (born 8 February 1975) is a Uruguayan retired footballer who played as a defensive midfielder.

== Club career ==
Born in Montevideo, Fleurquin started playing football with local Defensor Sporting. In 1999 he moved abroad for the first time, joining SK Sturm Graz in Austria and being regularly used by the club during two and a half Bundesliga seasons, with two runner-up league finishes.

In August 2001, Fleurquin signed for Galatasaray SK in Turkey, being a very important first-team unit as the side won another Süper Lig championship. After one year in France with Stade Rennais F.C. he moved to Spain, where he would remain for the following seven years.

Fleurquin started in Segunda División with Córdoba CF. For 2004–05 he continued in that level and Andalusia, but eventually attained La Liga promotion with Cádiz CF, being immediately relegated back with the player appearing in 30 matches and scoring once – on 2 October 2005, in a 1–1 home draw against RC Celta de Vigo.

From 2007 to 2010, Fleurquin obtained one second division promotion with Cádiz, but was also relegated twice from that tier while collecting a combined 33 yellow cards. In July 2010, aged nearly 35, he returned to first club Defensor after 11 years.

== International career ==
Fleurquin earned 11 caps for Uruguay during five years, his debut coming in 1997. He was selected for two Copa América tournaments, being regularly used during the 1999 edition in Paraguay as the national team finished second to Brazil.

== Honours ==
=== Club ===
Sturm Graz

- Austrian Supercup: 1999

Galatasaray

- Süper Lig: 2001–02

Cádiz

- Segunda División: 2004–05
- Segunda División B: 2008–09

=== International ===
Uruguay

- Copa América: Runner-up 1999
