= José Pereda =

Peruvian footballer (born 1973)

Personal information
- Full name: José Antonio Pereda Maruyama
- Date of birth: 8 September 1973 (age 53)
- Place of birth: Lima, Peru
- Height: 1.75 m (5 ft 9 in)
- Position: Midfielder

Senior career*
Years	Team	Apps	(Gls)
1991–1994	Universitario		(3)
1994	Lawn Tennis	14	(2)
1995	Cienciano	36	(13)
1996–1998	Universitario	70	(4)
1998–2001	Boca Juniors	48	(0)
2002	Universitario	22	(0)
2003	Melgar	19	(1)
2003	Coronel Bolognesi	8	(0)
2004–2006	Universitario	77	(3)
2007	Cienciano	9	(0)
2009	La Peña	15	(2)

International career
1996–2001	Peru	27	(4)
- * Club domestic league appearances and goals

José Pereda, also known as "El Chino" for his Japanese origin (Japanese: ホセ・アントニオ・ペレダ・マルヤマ; born 8 September 1973 in Lima) is a retired Peruvian footballer.

== Club career ==
Pereda played for a number of clubs in Peru, including Universitario and Cienciano. He also had a spell with Boca Juniors in the Primera División de Argentina.

== International career ==
Pereda made 27 appearances for the senior Peru national football team from 1996 to 2001.

== Honours ==
Universitario

- Peruvian Primera División: 1992, 1993, 1998

Boca Juniors

- Argentine Primera División: 1998 Apertura, 1999 Clausura, 2000 Apertura
- Copa Libertadores: 2000, 2001
- Intercontinental Cup: 2000
