= Jorge Vargas (footballer, born 1976) =

Chilean footballer and manager

Personal information
- Full name: Jorge Francisco Vargas Palacios
- Date of birth: 8 February 1976 (age 50)
- Place of birth: Santiago, Chile
- Height: 1.80 m (5 ft 11 in)
- Position: Defender

Team information
- Current team: Vigor Lamezia (manager)

Youth career
- Universidad Católica

Senior career*
Years	Team	Apps	(Gls)
1995–1999	Universidad Católica	59	(2)
1995	→ Huachipato (loan)	11	(0)
1997	→ Coquimbo Unido (loan)	12	(3)
1999–2003	Reggina	97	(3)
2003–2004	Empoli	17	(0)
2004–2006	Livorno	55	(0)
2006–2008	Red Bull Salzburg	49	(0)
2008–2009	Empoli	20	(0)
2009–2010	Spezia	7	(1)
2010	San Luis	13	(0)
2011–2012	Deportes La Serena	29	(0)
Total		369	(9)

International career
1999–2007	Chile	51	(1)

Managerial career
- 2016–2017: Reggina (youth)
- 2017–2018: Aurora Reggio
- 2019–2020: Shenzhen (assistant)
- 2021: Vigor Lamezia
- 2022–2023: Pro Patria
- 2026–: Vigor Lamezia
- * Club domestic league appearances and goals

Jorge Vargas (born 8 February 1976 in Santiago de Chile) is a Chilean football manager and former football defender. He is the current manager of Vigor Lamezia.

== Club career ==
Vargas debuted in his country's first division in 1995 while playing for Huachipato on loan from Universidad Católica. After returning from his loan spell Vargas received little playing time for Universidad Católica and was consequently loaned out during the 1997 season to Coquimbo Unido, where he began to make a name for himself with his solid play. His play did not go unnoticed by Universidad Católica as he returned to the club and began to feature regularly. By 1999 Vargas established himself as the symbol and most prominent member of the club appearing in 38 matches and netting three goals. Vargas started drawing interest from Italian clubs and by the end of 1999 was sold to Reggina.

With Reggina in the Italian Serie A, Vargas enjoyed the most successful part of his career. In four years he appeared in 97 league matches scoring three goals. For the 2003–04 season, Vargas joined Empoli but could not help the club avoid relegation. After his negative experience with Empoli, Vargas signed with A.S Livorno, where he recaptured the form that made him a standout for Reggina. In two years at the Tuscan club, Vargas appeared in 55 league matches.

After his successful Serie A career, Vargas signed on with top Austrian club Red Bull Salzburg for the 2006–07 season. He appeared in 26 league matches helping the club to the Austrian Bundesliga crown.

On 29 July 2008, Vargas joined the recently relegated Italian Serie B side Empoli.

On 25 November 2009, Vargas joined Spezia Calcio of Italian Serie C2.

== Managerial career ==
In 2016, he began his managerial career at the youth categories of Reggina. After managing ASD Aurora Reggio and working as the assistant of Roberto Donadoni for Shenzhen F.C., in 2021 he became the manager of Vigor Lamezia in the Eccellenza Calabria. After leaving Vigor Lamezia by the end of the season, on 30 June 2022 he was unveiled as the new head coach of Serie C club Pro Patria. After guiding Pro Patria to a mid-table placement, in April 2023 Vargas announced his departure from the club.

== National team ==
Vargas made his international debut for Chile on 28 April 1999. He cemented a starting role during his country's 4th-place finish during 1999 Copa América. During the latter months of 2006 and early 2007, Vargas was captain of the Chile national team. In July 2007 he was penalized by the Chilean Football Federation with a 20-match ban for his role in the unruly celebrations for qualifying for the second round of 2007 Copa América, in which several members of the team in a drunken state caused problems at the teams camp. Vargas to this day denies his role.

Vargas has represented Chile 52 times, scoring a lone goal versus Uruguay from the penalty spot.
