= Martín del Campo =

Uruguayan footballer (born 1975)

Martín Del Campo
Personal information
- Full name: Martín Gonzalo del Campo Martínez
- Date of birth: 24 May 1975 (age 51)
- Place of birth: Montevideo, Uruguay
- Height: 1.78 m (5 ft 10 in)
- Position: Defender

Senior career*
Years	Team	Apps	(Gls)
1995–1998	Montevideo Wanderers		
1998–2002	Nacional		
2003	River Plate	2	(0)
2004	Olimpia		
2004	Bella Vista		
2006	America-RJ		
2006–2007	Atlético de Rafaela	34	(0)
2007–2014	Tiro Federal	13	(0)

International career
1999	Uruguay	5	(0)
- * Club domestic league appearances and goals

Martín Gonzalo del Campo (born 24 May 1975) is a former Uruguayan footballer.

== Club career ==
Del Campo played for River Plate in the Primera División de Argentina.

== International career ==
Del Campo made five appearances for the senior Uruguay national football team during 1999, including four matches at the Copa América 1999.

== Honours ==
=== National team ===
- Uruguay
  - 1999 Copa América: 2nd place
