= Federico Magallanes =

Uruguayan footballer (born 1976)

Personal information
- Full name: Gerardo Federico Magallanes González
- Date of birth: 28 August 1976 (age 50)
- Place of birth: Montevideo, Uruguay
- Height: 1.84 m (6 ft 0 in)
- Position: Centre forward

Senior career*
Years	Team	Apps	(Gls)
1994–1996	Peñarol	34	(9)
1996–1998	Atalanta	24	(3)
1998	Real Madrid	0	(0)
1999–2000	Racing Santander	17	(1)
2000	Defensor Sporting	22	(13)
2000–2001	Racing Santander	15	(3)
2001–2002	Venezia	23	(5)
2002–2003	Torino	18	(1)
2003–2004	Sevilla	5	(1)
2005–2006	Eibar	10	(1)
2006–2007	Dijon	7	(2)
2008–2009	Mérida	16	(2)
Total		191	(41)

International career
1995–2002	Uruguay	26	(5)
- * Club domestic league appearances and goals

Gerardo Federico Magallanes González (born 28 August 1976) is a Uruguay former footballer who played as a forward.

He played for several clubs throughout his career, including Defensor Sporting, Peñarol Montevideo, Atalanta B.C., Real Madrid CF, Racing de Santander, S.S.C. Venezia, Torino F.C., SD Eibar, Sevilla FC, Dijon FCO and closed his career at Mérida UD in March 2009.

After having been without contract for over a year, on 26 October 2008, Magallanes made his debut for Mérida UD, in the Spanish 2ª División B, where he has signed until end of the 2008–09 season.

At international level, he also has played for the Uruguay national football team on 26 occasions between 1995 and 2002, scoring 5 goals, and was a member of team that finished in second-place at the 1999 Copa América; he was also participant at the 2002 FIFA World Cup.

== Career statistics ==
=== International ===
Appearances and goals by national team and year
National team	Year	Apps	Goals
Uruguay	1995	2	0
Uruguay	1998	1	0
Uruguay	1999	6	2
Uruguay	2000	5	1
Uruguay	2001	7	2
Uruguay	2002	5	0
Total		26	5

== Honours ==
=== International ===
Uruguay

- Copa América: Runner-up 1999
