= Gianni Guigou =

Uruguayan footballer (born 1975)

Personal information
- Full name: Gianni Bismark Guigou Martínez
- Date of birth: 22 February 1975 (age 51)
- Place of birth: Nueva Palmira, Uruguay
- Height: 1.76 m (5 ft 9 in)
- Position: Defensive midfielder

Senior career*
Years	Team	Apps	(Gls)
1994–2000	Nacional	64	(4)
2000–2004	Roma	36	(1)
2003–2004	→ Siena (loan)	32	(1)
2004–2006	Fiorentina	6	(0)
2006	→ Treviso (loan)	13	(0)
2006–2009	Treviso	69	(2)
2009–2010	Nacional	14	(1)
Total		234	(9)

International career
1999–2004	Uruguay	41	(0)
- * Club domestic league appearances and goals

Gianni Bismark Guigou Martínez (born 22 February 1975) is a Uruguayan former footballer who played as a midfielder.

== Career ==
He started his career in Nacional, where he played from 1994 to 2000, winning the Uruguayan league titles of 1998 and 2000. He left Nacional to join Serie A club Roma in 2000 for US$5.8M, where he won the 2000–01 Scudetto. Guigou left for Siena on loan in the summer of 2003, and was subsequently sold to Fiorentina in July 2004 for a nominal fee of €516. In June 2006, he left for newly relegated Serie B side Treviso as part of Massimo Gobbi and Reginaldo's deal.

After the club was excluded from professional football in 2009, he was released for free by the federation and later re-joined Nacional back in Uruguay. He played for Uruguay in the 2002 FIFA World Cup.

He also has Italian citizenship.

== Honours ==
Roma

- Serie A: 2000–01
- Supercoppa Italiana: 2001

Uruguay

- Copa América Runner-up: 1999
