= Marcelo Ramírez =

Chilean footballer (born 1965)

Personal information
- Full name: Marcelo Antonio Ramírez Gormaz
- Date of birth: May 29, 1965 (age 61)
- Place of birth: Santiago, Chile
- Height: 1.85 m (6 ft 1 in)
- Position: Goalkeeper

Senior career*
Years	Team	Apps	(Gls)
1984–2001	Colo-Colo		
1990	→ Naval (loan)		

International career
1993–2001	Chile	38	(0)

Managerial career
- 2022: Deportes Limache
- * Club domestic league appearances and goals

Marcelo Antonio Ramírez Gormaz (born May 29, 1965) is a retired Chilean football goalkeeper. He was capped 37 times with the Chile national team between 1993 and 2001, and was an unused substitute player for the 1998 FIFA World Cup. Ramírez is described as a late bloomer who was quick off the line and experienced success at saving penalty kicks.

== Post-retirement ==
In March 2025, Ramírez signed with TNT Sports Chile as a football commentator.

== Honours ==
Colo-Colo

- Primera División de Chile (7): 1986, 1989, 1991, 1993, 1996, 1997–A, 1998
- Copa Libertadores (1): 1991
- Recopa Sudamericana (1): 1992
- Copa Interamericana (1): 1992
- Copa Chile (5): 1985, 1988, 1989, 1994, 1996
