= Roberto Acuña =

Argentine–Paraguayan footballer (born 1972)

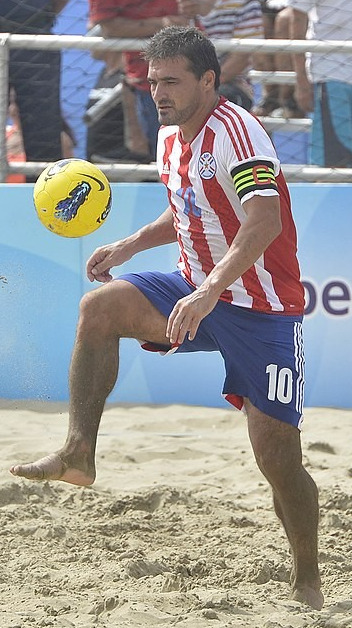
- Acuña at the 2015 South American Beach Soccer Championship

Personal information
- Full name: Roberto Miguel Acuña Cabello
- Date of birth: 25 March 1972 (age 54)
- Place of birth: Avellaneda, Argentina
- Height: 1.75 m (5 ft 9 in)
- Position: Midfielder

Team information
- Current team: Rubio Ñu (sporting director)

Senior career*
| Years | Team | Apps | (Gls) |
| 1989–1993 | Nacional | | |
| 1993–1994 | Argentinos Juniors | 33 | (4) |
| 1994–1995 | Boca Juniors | 31 | (3) |
| 1995–1997 | Indepediente | 65 | (3) |
| 1997–2002 | Zaragoza | 153 | (20) |
| 2002–2006 | Deportivo La Coruña | 14 | (0) |
| 2003–2004 | → Elche (loan) | 26 | (2) |
| 2004 | → Al Ain (loan) | 4 | (0) |
| 2007 | Rosario Central | 4 | (0) |
| 2007 | Olimpia | 16 | (3) |
| 2009–2012 | Rubio Ñu | 97 | (15) |
| 2013–2014 | 12 de Octubre | 8 | (1) |
| 2015 | Deportivo Recoleta | 11 | (2) |
| 2016–2017 | Rubio Ñu | 23 | (0) |
| 2017–2018 | 22 de Setiembre | | |
| Total | | 485 | (53) |

International career
| 1993–2011 | Paraguay | 100 | (5) |

Managerial career
- 2021–2022: Coritiba (assistant)
- 2024: Rubio Ñu
- 2026: Rubio Ñu (interim)
- * Club domestic league appearances and goals

Roberto Miguel Acuña Cabello (Spanish pronunciation: [roˈβeɾto miˈɣel aˈkuɲa kaˈβeʎo]; born 25 March 1972) is a Paraguayan football manager and former player. He is the current sporting director of Rubio Ñu.

Nicknamed "El Toro" (The Bull) due to his strength and dominating presence, he operated mainly as a central midfielder. He spent several years as a professional in Spain at Zaragoza and Deportivo, appearing rarely for the latter club.

Acuña played 100 times for Paraguay, representing the nation in three World Cups and four Copa América tournaments.

== Club career ==
Acuña was born in Avellaneda, Buenos Aires, Argentina, emigrating to Paraguay (his father's origin country) at a young age and started playing for Club Nacional in 1989. After five years, he decided to acquire the country's citizenship to play for the national team, eventually becoming the second most capped player in Paraguay's history, second only to Carlos Gamarra.

Afterwards, Acuña played four seasons back in Argentina, with Argentinos Juniors, Club Atlético Independiente and Boca Juniors, before moving to Europe in 1997 where he signed with Spain's Real Zaragoza. With the Aragonese he was an ever present midfield fixture, helping the side to the 2001 conquest of the Copa del Rey. In 2001, he won the Paraguayan Footballer of the Year award.

Consequently, Acuña attracted attention from Deportivo de La Coruña, which bought the player for five years and €11 million even though he was still due a five-match suspension from the previous season, where Zaragoza was relegated. With the Galicians, however, he never appeared more than seven times in the league during his spell, also struggling with injuries and being often loaned.

Acuña first retired in 2007, finishing his career in Paraguay with Olimpia Asunción. However, in 2009, he came out of inactivity, signing with lowly Club Rubio Ñu; in 2012, the 40-year-old joined Club 12 de Octubre.

In 2015, aged 43, Acuña helped Deportivo Recoleta gain promotion to the Paraguayan Primera División B. In December of that year, he re-joined former club Rubio Ñu.

== International career ==
Like central defender Gamarra, Acuña appeared in three FIFA World Cup – 1998, 2002 and 2006 – and collected 100 caps in total, scoring five goals. He played all the matches for the national team in all three editions, and was the first Paraguayan to be sent off in a World Cup when he elbowed Germany's Michael Ballack in the last minute of the 0–1 round-of-16 loss on 15 June 2002 (for a second bookable offense).

In the build-up to the 2006 World Cup, Acuña made headlines in Sweden after reportedly having asked a FIFA employee to phone and try to arrange a date with a female photographer. He retired from international competition on 11 June 2011 at the age of 39, captaining Paraguay in a friendly with Romania.

Acuña also represented the nation in the beach soccer variety.

=== International goals ===
Scores and results list Paraguay's goal tally first.

| No | Date | Venue | Opponent | Score | Result | Competition |
|---|---|---|---|---|---|---|
| 1. | 30 June 1995 | Estadio Defensores del Chaco, Asunción, Paraguay | Ecuador | 1–0 | 1–0 | Friendly |
| 2. | 11 June 1997 | Estadio Félix Capriles, Cochabamba, Bolivia | Chile | 1–0 | 1–0 | 1997 Copa América |
| 3. | 6 July 1997 | Estadio Defensores del Chaco, Asunción, Paraguay | Argentina | 1–2 | 1–2 | 1998 FIFA World Cup qualification |
| 4. | 3 June 1998 | Stadionul Steaua, Bucharest, Romania | Romania | 2–2 | 2–3 | Friendly |
| 5. | 16 August 2000 | Estadio Monumental Antonio Vespucio Liberti, Buenos Aires, Argentina | Argentina | 1–0 | 1–1 | 2002 FIFA World Cup qualification |

== Honours ==
=== Club ===
Independiente

- Supercopa Sudamericana: 1995

Zaragoza

- Copa del Rey: 2000–01

=== Individual ===
- Paraguayan Footballer of the Year: 2001

== See also ==
- List of men's footballers with 100 or more international caps
- Players and Records in Paraguayan Football
