= Pedro Reyes (footballer) =

Chilean footballer (born 1972)

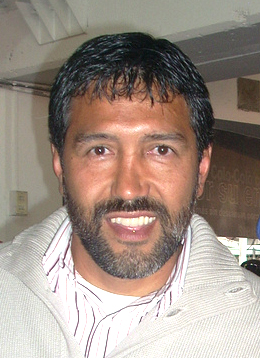
- Reyes in 2009

Personal information
- Full name: Pedro Antonio Reyes González
- Date of birth: 13 November 1972 (age 53)
- Place of birth: Antofagasta, Chile
- Height: 6 ft 1 in (1.85 m)
- Position: Defender

Youth career
- Deportes Antofagasta

Senior career*
Years	Team	Apps	(Gls)
1991–1992	Deportes Antofagasta	41	(3)
1993–1998	Colo-Colo	152	(4)
1998–2002	Auxerre	51	(1)
2002	Universidad de Chile	33	(0)
2003–2004	Unión Española	33	(1)
2004	Olimpia	0	(0)
2005	Deportes La Serena	18	(1)
2005	Audax Italiano	17	(0)
2006	Unión Española	23	(0)
2007–2008	Deportes Antofagasta	15	(2)
Total		383	(15)

International career
2000	Chile Olympic (O.P.)	6	(0)
1994–2001	Chile	55	(4)

Managerial career
- 2009–2015: Unión Española (assistant)
- 2015–2016: Colo-Colo (assistant)
- 2016–2018: Al-Ittihad (assistant)
- 2018: Shabab Al-Ahli (assistant)
- 2019: Al-Ittihad (assistant)
- 2020–2021: Palestino (assistant)
- 2023–2025: Unión Española (youth)
- 2024: Unión Española (caretaker)
- 2024–2025: Unión Española (assistant)
- 2026–: Colo-Colo Providencia
- * Club domestic league appearances and goals

Pedro Antonio Reyes González (born 13 November 1972) is a Chilean football manager and former defender.

== Playing career ==
Born in Antofagasta, Chile, Reyes is a product of local club, Deportes Antofagasta, and was promoted to the first team in 1991, under Andrija Perčić.

He was capped 55 times and scored four goals for the Chile national team between 1994 and 2001, including four games at the 1998 FIFA World Cup. In that tournament, Chile played to a 2-2 tie with Italy. In the 2000 Summer Olympics, Reyes helped Chile capture the bronze in football.

He retired on 1 May 2008. In his last match, he played with his World Cup's teammates Iván Zamorano, José Luis Sierra, Jorge Contreras, Javier Margas among others. The match was in Estadio Regional, Antofagasta.

== Coaching career ==
Reyes graduated as a football manager at the INAF (National Football Institute), alongside former footballers such as Dante Poli, Héctor Robles, among others. He has mainly developed his career as assistant of José Luis Sierra in Colo-Colo, Unión Española, Al-Ittihad. Shabab Al-Ahli and Palestino.

In December 2022, he assumed as coach of the Unión Española youth team.

In August 2026, Reyes joined the technical staff of the Colo-Colo academy based in Providencia commune.

== Honors ==
=== Player ===
Colo-Colo

- Primera División de Chile (4): 1993, 1996, 1997–C, 1998
- Copa Chile (2): 1994, 1996

Chile Olympic

- Summer Olympic Games (1): Bronze Medal in 2000 Sydney

=== Assistant coach ===
Unión Española

- Primera División de Chile: 2013 Transición
- Supercopa de Chile: 2013

Colo-Colo

- Primera División de Chile: 2015 Apertura

Al-Ittihad

- Saudi Crown Prince Cup: 2016–17
- King's Cup: 2018
