= 1999 Copa América =

Tournament details
- Host country: Paraguay
- Dates: 29 June – 18 July
- Teams: 12 (from 3 confederations)
- Venues: 5 (in 4 host cities)

Final positions
- Champions: Brazil (6th title)
- Runners-up: Uruguay
- Third place: Mexico
- Fourth place: Chile

Tournament statistics
- Matches played: 26
- Goals scored: 74 (2.85 per match)
- Attendance: 536,000 (20,615 per match)
- Top scorer(s): (Brazil) Ronaldo (Brazil) Rivaldo (5 goals each)
- Best player: (Brazil) Rivaldo

The 1999 Copa América was a football tournament held in Paraguay, from 29 June to 18 July. It was organized by CONMEBOL, South America's football governing body.

In order to bring the number of competing teams to twelve, CONMEBOL invited CONCACAF's Mexico, accepting their fourth invitation, and AFC's Japan, who made their debut at the tournament. Japan thus became the first country outside of Americas to participate at the Copa América. Uruguay fielded a youth team.

== Competing nations ==
As with previous tournaments, all ten members of CONMEBOL participated in the competition. In order to bring the number of competing teams to twelve, CONMEBOL invited Mexico (accepting their fourth invitation) from the CONCACAF and Japan from the AFC.

- Argentina
- Bolivia
- Brazil (holders)
- Chile
- Colombia
- Ecuador
- Japan (invitee)
- Mexico (invitee)
- Paraguay (hosts)
- Peru
- Uruguay
- Venezuela

== Venues ==
A total of four host cities hosted the tournament. The opening and final game were hosted by Estadio Defensores del Chaco.

1999 Copa América is located in Paraguay		Pedro Juan Caballero
1999 Copa América is located in Paraguay		Monumental Río Parapití
1999 Copa América is located in Paraguay		Capacity: 30,000
1999 Copa América is located in Paraguay		Ciudad del Este
1999 Copa América is located in Paraguay		Estadio Antonio Oddone Sarubbi
1999 Copa América is located in Paraguay		Capacity: 28,000
Asunción		Luque
Estadio Defensores del Chaco	Estadio General Pablo Rojas	Estadio Feliciano Cáceres
Capacity: 36,000	Capacity: 32,910	Capacity: 25,000

== Squads ==
For a complete list of participating squads: 1999 Copa América squads

== Venue selection ==
Paraguay was chosen to be the venue by defeating Colombia by seven votes to three.

== Group stage ==
The teams were divided into three groups of four teams each. The formation of the groups was made by CONMEBOL, in a public drawing of lots.

Each team plays one match against each of the other teams within the same group. Three points are awarded for a win, one point for a draw and zero points for a defeat.

First and second placed teams, in each group, advance to the quarter-finals. The best third placed team and the second best third placed team, also advance to the quarter-finals.

- Tie-breaker
  - If teams finish leveled on points, the following tie-breakers are used:
  1. greater goal difference in all group games;
  2. greater number of goals scored in all group games;
  3. winner of the head-to-head match between the teams in question;
  4. drawing of lots.

Key to colors in group tables
Group winners, runners-up, and best two third-placed teams advance to the quarter-finals

=== Group A ===
Team	Pld	W	D	L	GF	GA	GD	Pts
Paraguay (H)	3	2	1	0	5	0	+5	7
Peru	3	2	0	1	4	3	+1	6
Bolivia	3	0	2	1	1	2	−1	2
Japan	3	0	1	2	3	8	−5	1

(H) Hosts
29 June 1999
18:15

Peru	3–2	Japan
Jorge Soto 70'; Holsen 74', 81'	Report	Lopes 6'; Miura 77'

Estadio Defensores del Chaco, Asunción
Attendance: 38,000
Referee: Byron Moreno (Ecuador)
29 June 1999
21:15

Paraguay	0–0	Bolivia
	Report

Estadio Defensores del Chaco, Asunción
Attendance: 43,000
Referee: Mario Sánchez (Chile)

2 July 1999
19:05

Peru	1–0	Bolivia
Zúñiga 87'	Report

Estadio Defensores del Chaco, Asunción
Attendance: 30,000
Referee: Luis Solórzano (Venezuela)
2 July 1999
21:05

Paraguay	4–0	Japan
Benítez 18', 62'; Santa Cruz 40', 86'	Report

Estadio Defensores del Chaco, Asunción
Attendance: 25,000
Referee: Benito Archundia (Mexico)

5 July 1999
19:05

Japan	1–1	Bolivia
Lopes 75' (pen.)	Report	E. Sánchez 52'

Monumental Río Parapití, Pedro Juan Caballero
Attendance: 8,000
Referee: Byron Moreno (Ecuador)
5 July 1999
21:05

Paraguay	1–0	Peru
Santa Cruz 88'	Report

Monumental Río Parapití, Pedro Juan Caballero
Attendance: 8,000
Referee: Óscar Ruiz (Colombia)

=== Group B ===
Team	Pld	W	D	L	GF	GA	GD	Pts
Brazil	3	3	0	0	10	1	+9	9
Mexico	3	2	0	1	5	3	+2	6
Chile	3	1	0	2	3	2	+1	3
Venezuela	3	0	0	3	1	13	−12	0

30 June 1999
18:35

Chile	0–1	Mexico
	Report	Hernández 59'

Estadio Antonio Oddone Sarubbi, Ciudad del Este
Attendance: 22,000
Referee: Horacio Elizondo (Argentina)
30 June 1999
20:35

Brazil	7–0	Venezuela
Ronaldo 28', 62'; Emerson 40'; Amoroso 54', 81'; Ronaldinho 74'; Rivaldo 82'	Report

Estadio Antonio Oddone Sarubbi, Ciudad del Este
Attendance: 22,000
Referee: Bonifacio Núñez (Paraguay)

3 July 1999
15:05

Brazil	2–1	Mexico
Amoroso 20'; Alex 45'	Report	Terrazas 74'

Estadio Antonio Oddone Sarubbi, Ciudad del Este
Attendance: 22,000
Referee: Gustavo Méndez (Uruguay)
3 July 1999
17:05

Chile	3–0	Venezuela
Zamorano 5'; Sierra 21'; Tortolero 66' (o.g.)	Report

Estadio Antonio Oddone Sarubbi, Ciudad del Este
Attendance: 22,000
Referee: Juan Luna (Bolivia)

6 July 1999
18:35

Mexico	3–1	Venezuela
Blanco 21', 39'; Osorno 29'	Report	Urdaneta 72'

Estadio Antonio Oddone Sarubbi, Ciudad del Este
Attendance: 18,000
Referee: Bonifacio Núñez (Paraguay)
6 July 1999
20:35

Brazil	1–0 (Note: Match stopped by referee after 85 minutes due to heavy fog and abandoned after few minutes of waiting, with score declared final.)	Chile
Ronaldo 36' (pen.)	Report

Estadio Antonio Oddone Sarubbi, Ciudad del Este
Attendance: 18,000
Referee: Horacio Elizondo (Argentina)

=== Group C ===
Team	Pld	W	D	L	GF	GA	GD	Pts
Colombia	3	3	0	0	6	1	+5	9
Argentina	3	2	0	1	5	4	+1	6
Uruguay	3	1	0	2	2	4	−2	3
Ecuador	3	0	0	3	3	7	−4	0

1 July 1999
19:05

Uruguay	0–1	Colombia
	Report	Bonilla 20'

Estadio General Pablo Rojas, Asunción
Attendance: 3,000
Referee: Wilson de Souza (Brazil)
1 July 1999
21:05

Argentina	3–1	Ecuador
Simeone 12'; Palermo 55', 61'	Report	Kaviedes 77'

Estadio Feliciano Cáceres, Luque
Attendance: 12,000
Referee: Gilberto Hidalgo (Peru)

4 July 1999
15:05

Uruguay	2–1	Ecuador
Zalayeta 72', 74'	Report	Kaviedes 78'

Estadio Feliciano Cáceres, Luque
Attendance: 18,000
Referee: Mario Sánchez (Chile)
4 July 1999
17:05

Argentina	0–3	Colombia
	Report	Córdoba 10' (pen.); Congo 79'; Montaño 87'

Estadio Feliciano Cáceres, Luque
Attendance: 15,000
Referee: Ubaldo Aquino (Paraguay)

7 July 1999
19:05

Colombia	2–1	Ecuador
Morantes 37'; Ricard 39'	Report	Graziani 50'

Estadio Feliciano Cáceres, Luque
Attendance: 8,000
Referee: Masayoshi Okada (Japan)
7 July 1999
21:05

Argentina	2–0	Uruguay
Kily González 1'; Palermo 56'	Report

Estadio Feliciano Cáceres, Luque
Attendance: 8,000
Referee: Gilberto Hidalgo (Peru)

=== Ranking of third-placed teams ===
At the end of the first stage, a comparison was made between the third-placed teams of each group. The two best third-placed teams advanced to the quarter-finals.

Grp	Team	Pld	W	D	L	GF	GA	GD	Pts
B	Chile	3	1	0	2	3	2	+1	3
C	Uruguay	3	1	0	2	2	4	−2	3
A	Bolivia	3	0	2	1	1	2	−1	2

== Knockout stage ==
Quarter-finals
10 July – Asunción
Paraguay	1 (3)
Uruguay	1 (5)
11 July – Luque
Colombia	2
Chile	3
10 July – Asunción
Peru	3 (2)
Mexico	3 (4)
11 July – Ciudad del Este
Brazil	2
Argentina	1

Semi-finals
13 July – Asunción
Uruguay	1 (5)
Chile	1 (3)
14 July – Ciudad del Este
Mexico	0
Brazil	2

Final
18 July – Asunción
Uruguay	0
Brazil	3
Third place
17 July – Asunción
Chile	1
Mexico	2

=== Quarter-finals ===
10 July 1999
15:05

Peru	3–3	Mexico
Palacios 5'; Pereda 15'; Solano 40'	Report	Hernández 29', 33' (pen.); Torrado 88'
Penalties
Solano (penalty scored); Jorge Soto (penalty scored); José Soto (penalty missed); Reynoso (penalty missed)	2–4	(penalty scored) Suárez; (penalty scored) Terrazas; (penalty scored) R. García; (penalty scored) Zepeda

Estadio Defensores del Chaco, Asunción
Attendance: 32,000
Referee: Wilson de Souza (Brazil)

10 July 1999
17:35

Paraguay	1–1	Uruguay
Benítez 15'	Report	Zalayeta 65'
Penalties
Gamarra (penalty scored); Acuña (penalty scored); Enciso (penalty scored); Benítez (penalty missed)	3–5	(penalty scored) Fleurquin; (penalty scored) Guigou; (penalty scored) Alonso; (penalty scored) Zalayeta; (penalty scored) Magallanes

Estadio Defensores del Chaco, Asunción
Attendance: 32,000
Referee: Óscar Ruiz (Colombia)

11 July 1999
14:35

Colombia	2–3	Chile
Bolaño 7'; Bonilla 35'	Report	Reyes 25', 49'; Zamorano 64'

Estadio Feliciano Cáceres, Luque
Attendance: 12,000
Referee: Benito Archundia (Mexico)

11 July 1999
17:05

Brazil	2–1	Argentina
Rivaldo 32'; Ronaldo 48'	Report	Sorín 11'

Estadio Antonio Oddone Sarubbi, Ciudad del Este
Attendance: 25,000
Referee: Gustavo Méndez (Uruguay)

=== Semi-finals ===
13 July 1999
21:05

Uruguay	1–1	Chile
Lembo 23'	Report	Zamorano 63'
Penalties
Del Campo (penalty scored); Guigou (penalty scored); Alonso (penalty scored); Zalayeta (penalty scored); Magallanes (penalty scored)	5–3	(penalty scored) Vargas; (penalty missed) Aros; (penalty scored) Reyes; (penalty scored) Pizarro

Estadio Defensores del Chaco, Asunción
Attendance: 12,000
Referee: Ubaldo Aquino (Paraguay)

14 July 1999
20:35

Mexico	0–2	Brazil
	Report	Amoroso 25'; Rivaldo 43'

Estadio Antonio Oddone Sarubbi, Ciudad del Este
Attendance: 28,000
Referee: Byron Moreno (Ecuador)

=== Third-place match ===
17 July 1999
15:05

Chile	1–2	Mexico
Palacios 80'	Report	Palencia 26'; Zepeda 87'

Estadio Defensores del Chaco, Asunción
Attendance: 12,000
Referee: Horacio Elizondo (Argentina)

=== Final ===
18 July 1999
17:05

Uruguay	0–3	Brazil
	Report	Rivaldo 20', 26'; Ronaldo 48'

Estadio Defensores del Chaco, Asunción
Attendance: 43,000
Referee: Óscar Ruiz (Colombia)

== Result ==
1999 Copa América champions

Brazil
Sixth title

== Statistics ==
=== Goalscorers ===
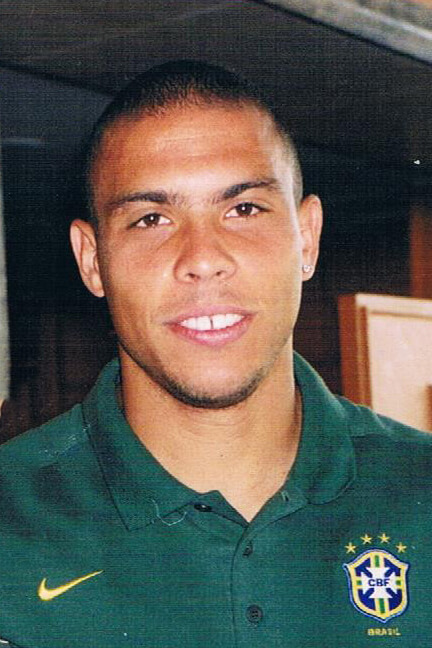
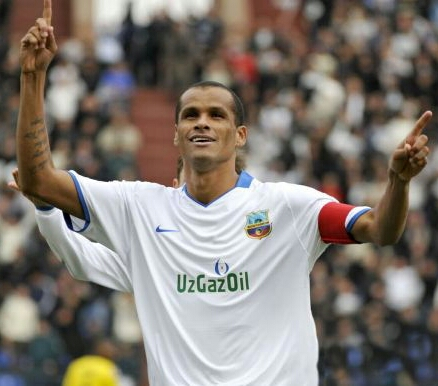
Ronaldo (left) and Rivaldo, top scorers

With five goals apiece, Ronaldo and Rivaldo were the tournament's top scorers. There were 74 goals scored in 26 matches, for an average of 2.85 goals per match.

5 goals

- (Brazil) Rivaldo
- (Brazil) Ronaldo

4 goals

- (Brazil) Amoroso

3 goals

- (Argentina) Martín Palermo
- (Chile) Iván Zamorano
- (Mexico) Luis Hernández
- (Paraguay) Miguel Ángel Benítez
- (Paraguay) Roque Santa Cruz
- (Uruguay) Marcelo Zalayeta

2 goals

- (Chile) Pedro Reyes
- (Colombia) Víctor Bonilla
- (Ecuador) Iván Kaviedes
- (Japan) Wagner Lopes
- (Mexico) Cuauhtémoc Blanco
- (Peru) Roberto Holsen

1 goal

- (Argentina) Kily González
- (Argentina) Diego Simeone
- (Argentina) Juan Pablo Sorín
- (Bolivia) Erwin Sánchez
- (Brazil) Alex
- (Brazil) Emerson
- (Brazil) Ronaldinho
- (Chile) Raúl Palacios
- (Chile) José Luis Sierra
- (Colombia) Jorge Bolaño
- (Colombia) Edwin Congo
- (Colombia) Iván Córdoba
- (Colombia) Johnnier Montaño
- (Colombia) Neider Morantes
- (Colombia) Hámilton Ricard
- (Ecuador) Ariel Graziani
- (Japan) Atsuhiro Miura
- (Mexico) Daniel Osorno
- (Mexico) Francisco Palencia
- (Mexico) Isaac Terrazas
- (Mexico) Gerardo Torrado
- (Mexico) Miguel Zepeda
- (Peru) Roberto Palacios
- (Peru) José Pereda
- (Peru) Nolberto Solano
- (Peru) Jorge Soto
- (Peru) Ysrael Zúñiga
- (Uruguay) Alejandro Lembo
- (Venezuela) Gabriel Urdaneta

1 own goal

- (Venezuela) Edson Tortolero (against Chile)

=== All-Star Team ===
The following team was selected as the ideal team of the tournament by El País.

Goalkeepers	Defenders	Midfielders	Forwards
(Uruguay) Fabián Carini	(Brazil) Cafu (Brazil) Roberto Carlos (Mexico) Rafael Márquez (Paraguay) Carlos Gamarra	(Brazil) Rivaldo (Brazil) Emerson (Colombia) Betancourt (Argentina) Juan Román Riquelme	(Chile) Iván Zamorano (Mexico) Luis Hernández

=== Final positions ===
Pos	Team	Pld	W	D	L	GF	GA	GD	Pts	Eff
1	Brazil	6	6	0	0	17	2	+15	18	100.0%
2	Uruguay	6	1	2	3	4	9	−5	5	27.8%
3	Mexico	6	3	1	2	10	9	+1	10	55.6%
4	Chile	6	2	1	3	8	7	+1	7	38.9%
Eliminated in the Quarterfinals
5	Colombia	4	3	0	1	8	4	+4	9	75.0%
6	Paraguay	4	2	2	0	6	1	+5	8	66.7%
7	Peru	4	2	1	1	7	6	+1	7	58.3%
8	Argentina	4	2	0	2	6	6	0	6	50.0%
Eliminated in the First Stage
9	Bolivia	3	0	2	1	1	2	−1	2	22.2%
10	Japan	3	0	1	2	3	8	−5	1	11.1%
11	Ecuador	3	0	0	3	3	7	−4	0	0.0%
12	Venezuela	3	0	0	3	1	13	−12	0	0.0%

== Marketing ==
=== Sponsorship ===
Global platinum sponsor

- MasterCard
- Telefónica

Global gold sponsor

- Anheuser-Busch InBev (Budweiser is the brand advertised)
- Coca-Cola
- Umbro

Local suppliers

- Traffic Group
- Bansud
- Grupo Financiero Banamex
