= 1995 Copa América squads =

List of footballers

Below are the rosters for the Copa América 1995 football tournament in Uruguay, from 5 to 23 July 1995. For this edition, Mexico and the United States were invited once again.

== Group A ==
=== Mexico ===
Head coach: Miguel Mejía Barón

No.	Pos.	Player	Date of birth (age)	Caps	Club
1	GK	Nicolás Navarro	17 September 1963 (aged 31)		(Mexico) Necaxa
2	DF	Claudio Suárez	17 December 1968 (aged 26)		(Mexico) UNAM Pumas
3	DF	Juan Ramírez Perales	8 March 1969 (aged 26)		(Mexico) Monterrey
4	DF	Ignacio Ambríz (c)	7 February 1965 (aged 30)		(Mexico) Necaxa
5	DF	Ramón Ramírez	5 December 1969 (aged 25)		(Mexico) Guadalajara
6	MF	Marcelino Bernal	27 May 1962 (aged 33)		(Mexico) Toluca
7	FW	Carlos Hermosillo	24 August 1964 (aged 30)		(Mexico) Cruz Azul
8	MF	Alberto García Aspe	11 May 1967 (aged 28)		(Mexico) Necaxa
9	GK	Jorge Campos	15 October 1966 (aged 28)		(Mexico) UNAM Pumas
10	FW	Luis García	1 June 1969 (aged 26)		(Mexico) Club América
11	FW	Luís Roberto Alves	23 May 1967 (aged 28)		(Mexico) Club América
12	GK	Óscar Pérez	1 February 1973 (aged 22)		(Mexico) Cruz Azul
13	DF	Manuel Vidrio	23 August 1973 (aged 21)		(Mexico) Guadalajara
14	MF	Joaquín del Olmo	20 April 1969 (aged 26)		(Mexico) Club América
15	MF	Missael Espinoza	12 April 1965 (aged 30)		(Mexico) Guadalajara
16	MF	Alberto Coyote	26 March 1967 (aged 28)		(Mexico) Guadalajara
17	MF	Benjamín Galindo	11 December 1960 (aged 34)		(Mexico) Santos Laguna
18	DF	Gerardo Esquivel	13 January 1966 (aged 29)		(Mexico) Necaxa
19	FW	Manuel Martínez	3 January 1972 (aged 23)		(Mexico) Guadalajara
20	MF	Jorge Rodríguez	18 April 1968 (aged 27)		(Mexico) Toluca
21	DF	Raúl Gutiérrez	16 October 1966 (aged 28)		(Mexico) Club América
22	FW	Luis Miguel Salvador	22 February 1968 (aged 27)		(Mexico) Atlante

=== Paraguay ===
Head coach: (Hungary) (Spain) Ladislao Kubala

No.	Pos.	Player	Date of birth (age)	Caps	Club
1	GK	Rubén Ruiz Díaz	11 November 1969 (aged 25)		(Mexico) Monterrey
2	DF	Silvio Suárez	5 January 1969 (aged 26)		(Paraguay) Olimpia Asunción
3	DF	Juan Ramón Jara	6 August 1970 (aged 24)		(Argentina) Rosario Central
4	DF	Juan Carlos Villamayor	5 March 1969 (aged 26)		(Paraguay) Cerro Porteño
5	DF	Carlos Gamarra (c)	17 February 1971 (aged 24)		(Paraguay) Cerro Porteño
6	DF	Celso Ayala	20 August 1970 (aged 24)		(Argentina) River Plate
7	FW	Richard Báez	31 July 1973 (aged 21)		(Paraguay) Olimpia Asunción
8	MF	Estanislao Struway	25 June 1968 (aged 27)		(Paraguay) Cerro Porteño
9	FW	José Cardozo	19 March 1971 (aged 24)		(Mexico) Toluca
10	MF	Roberto Acuña	25 March 1972 (aged 23)		(Argentina) Boca Juniors
11	FW	Jorge Luis Campos	11 August 1970 (aged 24)		(Paraguay) Olimpia Asunción
12	GK	Jorge Battaglia	12 May 1960 (aged 35)		(Paraguay) Olimpia Asunción
13	DF	Osvaldo Peralta	2 February 1971 (aged 24)		(Paraguay) Club Guaraní
14	MF	Nery Ortíz	16 March 1973 (aged 22)		(Paraguay) Club Guaraní
15	MF	Julio César Enciso	5 August 1974 (aged 20)		(Paraguay) Cerro Porteño
16	DF	Francisco Arce	2 April 1971 (aged 24)		(Brazil) Grêmio
17	MF	Gustavo Sotelo	16 March 1968 (aged 27)		(Brazil) Cruzeiro
18	FW	Edgar Denis	11 December 1969 (aged 25)		(Paraguay) Cerro Corá
19	MF	Francisco Esteche	12 November 1973 (aged 21)		(Paraguay) Olimpia Asunción
20	MF	Adriano Samaniego	8 September 1963 (aged 31)		(Paraguay) Olimpia Asunción
21	MF	Pedro Sarabia	5 July 1975 (aged 20)		(Paraguay) Club Sport Colombia
22	GK	Danilo Aceval	15 September 1975 (aged 19)		(Paraguay) Cerro Porteño

=== Uruguay ===
Head coach: Héctor Núñez

No.	Pos.	Player	Date of birth (age)	Caps	Club
1	GK	Fernando Álvez	4 September 1959 (aged 35)		(Uruguay) CA River Plate
2	DF	Óscar Aguirregaray	25 October 1959 (aged 35)		(Uruguay) Peñarol
3	DF	Eber Moas	21 March 1969 (aged 26)		(Colombia) América de Cali
4	DF	José Herrera	17 June 1965 (aged 30)		(Italy) Cagliari
5	MF	Álvaro Gutiérrez	21 July 1968 (aged 26)		(Uruguay) Nacional
6	DF	Edgardo Adinolfi	27 March 1973 (aged 22)		(Uruguay) CA River Plate
7	FW	Marcelo Otero	14 April 1971 (aged 24)		(Uruguay) Peñarol
8	MF	Pablo Bengoechea	27 June 1965 (aged 30)		(Uruguay) Peñarol
9	FW	Daniel Fonseca	13 September 1969 (aged 25)		(Italy) Roma
10	FW	Enzo Francescoli (c)	12 November 1961 (aged 33)		(Argentina) River Plate
11	MF	Gustavo Poyet	15 November 1967 (aged 27)		(Spain) Real Zaragoza
12	GK	Claudio Arbiza	3 March 1967 (aged 28)		(Paraguay) Olimpia Asunción
13	MF	Rubén da Silva	11 April 1968 (aged 27)		(Argentina) Boca Juniors
14	DF	Gustavo Méndez	3 February 1971 (aged 24)		(Uruguay) Nacional
15	MF	Marcelo Saralegui	18 May 1971 (aged 24)		(Argentina) Racing Club
16	DF	Diego López	22 August 1974 (aged 20)		(Uruguay) CA River Plate
17	FW	Sergio Martínez	15 February 1969 (aged 26)		(Argentina) Boca Juniors
18	DF	Tabaré Silva	30 August 1974 (aged 20)		(Uruguay) Defensor Sporting
19	MF	Nelson Abeijón	27 July 1973 (aged 21)		(Uruguay) Nacional
20	FW	Rubén Sosa	25 April 1966 (aged 29)		(Italy) Internazionale
21	MF	Diego Dorta	31 December 1971 (aged 23)		(Uruguay) Peñarol
22	GK	Oscar Ferro	2 March 1967 (aged 28)		(Uruguay) Peñarol

=== Venezuela ===
Head coach: (Spain) Rafael Santana

No.	Pos.	Player	Date of birth (age)	Caps	Club
1	GK	Rafael Dudamel	7 January 1973 (aged 22)		(Venezuela) Atlético El Vigía
2	DF	Héctor Rivas (c)	27 September 1968 (aged 26)		(Venezuela) Marítimo
3	DF	Elvis Martínez	4 October 1970 (aged 24)		(Venezuela) Caracas Fútbol Club
4	DF	Marcos Mathías	15 May 1963 (aged 32)		(Venezuela) Trujillanos
5	MF	Sergío Hernández	31 January 1971 (aged 24)		(Venezuela) Táchira
6	DF	Edson Tortolero	27 August 1971 (aged 23)		(Venezuela) Minervén
7	MF	Leonardo Alberto González	14 July 1972 (aged 22)		(Venezuela) Trujillanos
8	MF	Gerson Díaz	11 February 1972 (aged 23)		(Venezuela) Caracas Fútbol Club
9	FW	José Luis Dolgetta	1 August 1970 (aged 24)		(Venezuela) Táchira
10	MF	Gabriel Miranda	20 August 1968 (aged 26)		(Venezuela) Caracas Fútbol Club
11	FW	Juan Enrique García	16 April 1970 (aged 25)		(Venezuela) Minervén
12	GK	Félix Golindano	12 March 1974 (aged 21)		(Venezuela) Trujillanos
13	DF	Luis Filosa	15 February 1973 (aged 22)		(Venezuela) Mineros
14	MF	William González	27 December 1969 (aged 25)		(Venezuela) Mineros
15	MF	Alexander Hezzel	12 August 1964 (aged 30)		(Venezuela) Caracas Fútbol Club
16	FW	Dioni Guerra	27 September 1971 (aged 23)		(Venezuela) Minervén
17	FW	Edson Rodríguez	24 July 1970 (aged 24)		(Venezuela) Marítimo
18	DF	Jesús Valbuena	28 July 1969 (aged 25)		(Venezuela) Trujillanos
19	DF	Carlos José García	12 November 1971 (aged 23)		(Venezuela) Minervén
20	MF	Wilson Chacón	11 May 1971 (aged 24)		(Venezuela) Táchira
21	FW	Stalin Rivas	5 September 1971 (aged 23)		(Venezuela) Caracas Fútbol Club
22	GK	Gilberto Angelucci	7 August 1967 (aged 27)		(Argentina) San Lorenzo

== Group B ==
=== Brazil ===
Head coach: Mário Zagallo

No.	Pos.	Player	Date of birth (age)	Caps	Club
1	GK	Cláudio Taffarel	8 May 1966 (aged 29)		(Brazil) Atlético Mineiro
2	DF	Jorginho	17 August 1964 (aged 30)		(Japan) Kashima Antlers
3	DF	Aldair	30 November 1965 (aged 29)		(Italy) Roma
4	DF	Ronaldão	19 June 1965 (aged 30)		(Japan) Shimizu S-Pulse
5	MF	César Sampaio	31 March 1968 (aged 27)		(Japan) Yokohama Flügels
6	DF	Roberto Carlos	10 April 1973 (aged 22)		(Brazil) Palmeiras
7	FW	Edmundo	2 April 1971 (aged 24)		(Brazil) Flamengo
8	MF	Dunga (c)	31 October 1963 (aged 31)		(Japan) Júbilo Iwata
9	FW	Túlio	2 June 1969 (aged 26)		(Brazil) Botafogo
10	MF	Juninho Paulista	22 February 1973 (aged 22)		(Brazil) São Paulo
11	MF	Zinho	17 June 1967 (aged 28)		(Japan) Yokohama Flügels
12	GK	Danrlei	18 April 1973 (aged 22)		(Brazil) Grêmio
13	DF	Rodrigo Chagas	19 March 1973 (aged 22)		(Brazil) Vitória
14	DF	André Cruz	20 September 1968 (aged 26)		(Italy) Napoli
15	MF	Narciso	23 December 1973 (aged 21)		(Brazil) Santos
16	MF	Leandro Ávila	6 April 1971 (aged 24)		(Brazil) Vasco da Gama
17	MF	Beto	7 January 1975 (aged 20)		(Brazil) Botafogo
18	MF	Leonardo	5 September 1969 (aged 25)		(Japan) Kashima Antlers
19	MF	Souza	6 June 1975 (aged 20)		(Brazil) Corinthians
20	FW	Ronaldo	22 September 1976 (aged 18)		(Netherlands) PSV Eindhoven
21	MF	Sávio	9 January 1974 (aged 21)		(Brazil) Flamengo
22	GK	Dida	7 October 1973 (aged 21)		(Brazil) Cruzeiro

=== Colombia ===
Head coach: Hernán Darío Gómez

No.	Pos.	Player	Date of birth (age)	Caps	Club
1	GK	René Higuita	28 August 1966 (aged 28)		(Colombia) Atlético Nacional
2	DF	José Santa	12 November 1970 (aged 24)		(Colombia) Atlético Nacional
3	DF	Alexis Mendoza	8 November 1961 (aged 33)		(Colombia) Atlético Junior
4	DF	Alex Fernández	22 May 1970 (aged 25)		(Colombia) Independiente Medellín
5	DF	Jorge Bermúdez	18 June 1971 (aged 24)		(Colombia) América de Cali
6	MF	Hermán Gaviria	27 November 1969 (aged 25)		(Colombia) Atlético Nacional
7	FW	Miguel Guerrero	7 December 1967 (aged 27)		(Italy) Bari
8	MF	John Harold Lozano	30 March 1972 (aged 23)		(Brazil) Palmeiras
9	FW	Níver Arboleda	12 December 1967 (aged 27)		(Colombia) Deportivo Cali
10	MF	Carlos Valderrama (c)	2 September 1961 (aged 33)		(Colombia) Atlético Junior
11	FW	Faustino Asprilla	10 November 1969 (aged 25)		(Italy) Parma
12	GK	Miguel Calero	14 April 1971 (aged 24)		(Colombia) Deportivo Cali
13	DF	Wilmer Cabrera	15 September 1967 (aged 27)		(Colombia) América de Cali
14	MF	Leonel Álvarez	29 July 1965 (aged 29)		(Colombia) América de Cali
15	MF	Bonner Mosquera	2 December 1970 (aged 24)		(Colombia) Millonarios
16	FW	Víctor Aristizábal	9 December 1971 (aged 23)		(Colombia) Atlético Nacional
17	FW	Freddy León	24 September 1970 (aged 24)		(Colombia) Millonarios
18	DF	James Cardona	30 March 1967 (aged 28)		(Colombia) América de Cali
19	MF	Freddy Rincón	14 August 1966 (aged 28)		(Italy) Napoli
20	MF	Luis Quiñónez	5 October 1968 (aged 26)		(Colombia) Once Caldas
21	MF	Francisco Cassiani	10 January 1970 (aged 25)		(Colombia) Atlético Junior
22	GK	Oscar Córdoba	3 February 1970 (aged 25)		(Colombia) América de Cali

=== Ecuador ===
Head coach: (Colombia) Francisco Maturana

No.	Pos.	Player	Date of birth (age)	Caps	Club
1	GK	José Francisco Cevallos	11 April 1971 (aged 24)		(Ecuador) Barcelona
2	DF	Juan Guamán	27 June 1965 (aged 30)		(Ecuador) LDU Quito
3	DF	Iván Hurtado	16 August 1974 (aged 20)		(Ecuador) Emelec
4	DF	Luis Capurro (c)	1 May 1961 (aged 34)		(Ecuador) Emelec
5	DF	Máximo Tenorio	30 September 1969 (aged 25)		(Ecuador) Emelec
6	MF	Nixon Carcelén	10 February 1969 (aged 26)		(Ecuador) Deportivo Quito
7	MF	Alex Aguinaga	9 July 1968 (aged 26)		(Mexico) Necaxa
8	MF	Juan Carlos Garay	15 September 1968 (aged 26)		(Ecuador) LDU Quito
9	FW	Eduardo Hurtado	12 January 1969 (aged 26)		(Ecuador) Emelec
10	MF	Ivo Ron	16 January 1967 (aged 28)		(Ecuador) Emelec
11	FW	Patricio Hurtado	6 July 1974 (aged 20)		(Ecuador) LDU Quito
12	GK	Carlos Luis Morales	12 June 1965 (aged 30)		(Argentina) Independiente
13	MF	Nicolás Asencio	26 April 1975 (aged 20)		(Ecuador) Aucas
14	DF	Raul Noriega	1 January 1970 (aged 25)		(Ecuador) Barcelona
15	DF	Dannes Coronel	24 May 1963 (aged 32)		(Ecuador) Emelec
16	DF	Hólger Quiñónez	18 September 1962 (aged 32)		(Colombia) Deportivo Pereira
17	FW	Energio Díaz	15 September 1969 (aged 25)		(Ecuador) Deportivo Cuenca
18	FW	Diego Herrera	29 April 1969 (aged 26)		(Ecuador) LDU Quito
19	FW	Johnny León	18 May 1969 (aged 26)		(Ecuador) Green Cross
20	FW	José Mora	28 August 1975 (aged 19)		(Ecuador) Barcelona
21	MF	Héctor Carabalí	15 February 1972 (aged 23)		(Ecuador) Barcelona
22	GK	Jacinto Espinoza	24 November 1969 (aged 25)		(Ecuador) Emelec

=== Peru ===
Head coach: Miguel Company

No.	Pos.	Player	Date of birth (age)	Caps	Club
1	GK	Miguel Miranda	13 August 1966 (aged 28)		(Peru) Deportivo Sipesa
2	DF	Jorge Soto	27 October 1971 (aged 23)		(Peru) Sporting Cristal
3	DF	Juan Reynoso	28 December 1969 (aged 25)		(Mexico) Cruz Azul
4	DF	Percy Olivares	5 June 1968 (aged 27)		(Spain) Tenerife
5	DF	Alfonso Dulanto	22 July 1969 (aged 25)		(Peru) Universitario de Deportes
6	DF	José Soto	11 January 1970 (aged 25)		(Peru) Sporting Cristal
7	FW	Ronald Baroni	8 April 1968 (aged 27)		(Portugal) Porto
8	MF	José del Solar (c)	27 November 1967 (aged 27)		(Spain) Tenerife
9	FW	Alberto Ramírez	5 November 1968 (aged 26)		(Peru) Deportivo Sipesa
10	MF	Roberto Palacios	28 December 1972 (aged 22)		(Peru) Sporting Cristal
11	MF	Germán Pinillos	6 April 1972 (aged 23)		(Peru) Sporting Cristal
12	GK	Martín Yupanqui	20 October 1962 (aged 32)		(Peru) Universitario de Deportes
13	FW	Alex Magallanes	1 March 1974 (aged 21)		(Peru) Sporting Cristal
14	DF	Alexis Ubillús	30 December 1972 (aged 22)		(Peru) Universitario de Deportes
15	MF	Nolberto Solano	12 December 1974 (aged 20)		(Peru) Sporting Cristal
16	DF	Julio César Rivera	12 April 1967 (aged 28)		(Peru) Sporting Cristal
17	MF	Juan Jayo	20 January 1973 (aged 22)		(Peru) Alianza Lima
18	DF	Martín García	4 June 1970 (aged 25)		(Peru) Deportivo Sipesa
19	MF	Germán Carty	16 July 1968 (aged 26)		(Peru) Universitario de Deportes
20	MF	Martín Rodríguez	24 September 1968 (aged 26)		(Peru) Universitario de Deportes
21	GK	Rafael Quesada	16 August 1971 (aged 23)		(Peru) Ciclista Lima
22	MF	José Luis Carranza	8 January 1964 (aged 31)		(Peru) Universitario de Deportes

== Group C ==
=== Argentina ===
Head coach: Daniel Passarella

No.	Pos.	Player	Date of birth (age)	Caps	Club
1	GK	Hernán Cristante	16 September 1969 (aged 25)		(Argentina) Platense
2	DF	Roberto Ayala	14 April 1973 (aged 22)		(Italy) Parma
3	DF	José Antonio Chamot	17 May 1969 (aged 26)		(Italy) Lazio
4	DF	Javier Zanetti	10 August 1973 (aged 21)		(Italy) Internazionale
5	MF	Hugo Pérez	6 September 1968 (aged 26)		(Spain) Sporting Gijón
6	DF	Fernando Cáceres	7 February 1969 (aged 26)		(Spain) Real Zaragoza
7	FW	Abel Balbo (c)	1 June 1966 (aged 29)		(Italy) Roma
8	MF	Diego Simeone	28 April 1970 (aged 25)		(Spain) Atlético Madrid
9	FW	Gabriel Batistuta	1 February 1969 (aged 26)		(Italy) Fiorentina
10	MF	Marcelo Gallardo	18 January 1976 (aged 19)		(Argentina) River Plate
11	MF	Sergio Berti	17 February 1969 (aged 26)		(Argentina) River Plate
12	GK	Carlos Bossio	1 December 1973 (aged 21)		(Argentina) Estudiantes de La Plata
13	DF	Ricardo Altamirano	12 December 1965 (aged 29)		(Argentina) River Plate
14	DF	Gabriel Schurrer	16 August 1971 (aged 23)		(Argentina) Lanús
15	DF	Néstor Fabbri	29 April 1968 (aged 27)		(Argentina) Boca Juniors
16	MF	Leonardo Astrada	6 January 1970 (aged 25)		(Argentina) River Plate
17	MF	Marcelo Escudero	25 July 1972 (aged 22)		(Argentina) Newell's Old Boys
18	MF	Marcelo Espina	28 April 1967 (aged 28)		(Chile) Colo-Colo
19	MF	Ariel Ortega	4 March 1974 (aged 21)		(Argentina) River Plate
20	FW	Alberto Acosta	23 August 1966 (aged 28)		(Chile) Universidad Católica
21	MF	Juan José Borrelli	8 October 1970 (aged 24)		(Greece) Panathinaikos
22	GK	Germán Burgos	16 April 1969 (aged 26)		(Argentina) River Plate

=== Bolivia ===
Head coach: (Spain) Antonio López Habas

No.	Pos.	Player	Date of birth (age)	Caps	Club
1	GK	Carlos Trucco	11 August 1957 (aged 37)		(Mexico) Pachuca
2	DF	Juan Carlos Ruíz	14 August 1968 (aged 26)		(Bolivia) Bolivar
3	DF	Marco Sandy	29 August 1971 (aged 23)		(Bolivia) Bolivar
4	DF	Miguel Rimba	1 November 1967 (aged 27)		(Bolivia) Bolivar
5	DF	Juan Manuel Peña	17 January 1973 (aged 22)		(Colombia) Independiente Santa Fe
6	MF	Luis Cristaldo	31 August 1969 (aged 25)		(Bolivia) Bolivar
7	FW	Demetrio Angola	22 June 1965 (aged 30)		(Bolivia) Jorge Wilstermann
8	MF	José Melgar	20 September 1959 (aged 35)		(Bolivia) Bolivar
9	FW	Álvaro Peña	11 February 1966 (aged 29)		(Colombia) Cortuluá
10	FW	Marco Etcheverry	26 September 1970 (aged 24)		(Colombia) América de Cali
11	FW	Miguel Mercado	30 August 1975 (aged 19)		(Bolivia) Bolivar
22	GK	Mauricio Soria	1 June 1966 (aged 29)		(Bolivia) Bolivar
13	DF	Óscar Carmelo Sánchez	16 July 1971 (aged 23)		(Bolivia) The Strongest
14	MF	Mauricio Ramos	9 March 1969 (aged 26)		(Bolivia) Bolivar
15	DF	Gustavo Quinteros	15 February 1965 (aged 30)		(Argentina) San Lorenzo
16	FW	Raúl Medeiros	2 February 1975 (aged 20)		(Sweden) BK Häcken
17	FW	Berthy Suárez	24 June 1969 (aged 26)		(Bolivia) Guabirá
18	MF	Carlos Borja (c)	25 December 1957 (aged 37)		(Bolivia) Bolivar
19	DF	Iván Sabino Castillo	11 July 1970 (aged 24)		(Bolivia) Bolivar
20	FW	Julio César Baldivieso	2 December 1971 (aged 23)		(Argentina) Newell's Old Boys
21	MF	Robert Arteaga	10 February 1973 (aged 22)		(Bolivia) The Strongest
12	GK	Marcelo Torrico	11 January 1972 (aged 23)		(Bolivia) The Strongest

=== Chile ===
Head coach: (Spain) Xabier Azkargorta

No.	Pos.	Player	Date of birth (age)	Caps	Club
1	GK	Marcelo Ramírez	29 May 1965 (aged 30)	9	(Chile) Colo-Colo
2	DF	Gabriel Mendoza	22 May 1968 (aged 27)	28	(Chile) Colo-Colo
3	DF	Eduardo Vilches	21 April 1963 (aged 32)	25	(Mexico) Necaxa
4	DF	Javier Margas	10 May 1969 (aged 26)	24	(Chile) Colo-Colo
5	DF	Miguel Ramírez	11 June 1970 (aged 25)	28	(Chile) Colo-Colo
6	MF	Fabián Guevara	22 June 1968 (aged 27)	19	(Mexico) Monterrey
7	MF	Esteban Valencia	8 January 1974 (aged 21)	10	Universidad de Chile
8	MF	Patricio Mardones	17 July 1962 (aged 32)	28	Universidad de Chile
9	FW	Sebastián Rozental	1 September 1976 (aged 18)	5	(Chile) Universidad Católica
10	MF	José Luis Sierra	5 December 1968 (aged 26)	12	(Brazil) São Paulo
11	FW	Ivo Basay	13 April 1966 (aged 29)	22	(Mexico) Necaxa
12	GK	Marco Cornez (c)	15 October 1958 (aged 36)	22	(Chile) Everton
13	MF	Clarence Acuña	8 February 1975 (aged 20)	5	(Chile) O'Higgins
14	DF	Rodrigo Pérez	19 August 1973 (aged 21)	4	(Chile) O'Higgins
15	MF	Fabián Estay	5 October 1968 (aged 26)	33	(Chile) Colo-Colo
16	DF	Ronald Fuentes	22 June 1969 (aged 26)	14	Universidad de Chile
17	MF	Nelson Parraguez	5 April 1971 (aged 24)	16	(Chile) Universidad Católica
18	MF	Pablo Galdames	26 June 1974 (aged 21)	4	(Chile) Unión Española
19	DF	Christian Castañeda	18 September 1968 (aged 26)	6	Universidad de Chile
20	FW	Marcelo Salas	24 December 1974 (aged 20)	11	Universidad de Chile
21	FW	Rodrigo Ruiz	10 May 1972 (aged 23)	3	(Mexico) Puebla
22	FW	Rodrigo Barrera	30 March 1970 (aged 25)	10	(Chile) Universidad Católica

=== United States ===
Head coach: Steve Sampson

No.	Pos.	Player	Date of birth (age)	Caps	Club
1	GK	Brad Friedel	18 May 1971 (aged 24)		(Denmark) Brøndby IF
2	DF	Mike Lapper	28 August 1970 (aged 24)		(Germany) VfL Wolfsburg
3	DF	Brian Bliss	28 September 1965 (aged 29)		(Germany) FC Carl Zeiss Jena
4	DF	Mike Burns	14 September 1970 (aged 24)		(United States) US Soccer
5	MF	Thomas Dooley	5 December 1961 (aged 33)		(Germany) Bayer Leverkusen
6	MF	John Harkes (c)	6 March 1967 (aged 28)		(England) Derby County
7	FW	Joe-Max Moore	23 February 1971 (aged 24)		(Germany) FC Saarbrücken
8	FW	Earnie Stewart	28 March 1969 (aged 26)		(Netherlands) Willem II
9	MF	Tab Ramos	21 September 1966 (aged 28)		(Mexico) Tigres UANL
10	MF	Mike Sorber	14 May 1971 (aged 24)		(Mexico) UNAM Pumas
11	FW	Eric Wynalda	9 June 1969 (aged 26)		(Germany) VfL Bochum
12	GK	Juergen Sommer	27 February 1969 (aged 26)		(England) Luton Town
13	FW	Cobi Jones	16 June 1970 (aged 25)		(England) Coventry City
14	MF	Frank Klopas	1 September 1966 (aged 28)		(Greece) Apollon Athens
15	DF	Jovan Kirovski	18 March 1976 (aged 19)		(England) Manchester United
16	MF	Gregg Berhalter	1 August 1973 (aged 21)		(Netherlands) FC Zwolle
17	DF	Marcelo Balboa	8 August 1967 (aged 27)		(Mexico) Club León
18	GK	Kasey Keller	29 November 1969 (aged 25)		(England) Millwall
19	FW	John Kerr	6 March 1965 (aged 30)		(England) Millwall
20	DF	Paul Caligiuri	9 May 1964 (aged 31)		(United States) Los Angeles Salsa
21	MF	Claudio Reyna	20 July 1973 (aged 21)		(Germany) Bayer Leverkusen
22	DF	Alexi Lalas	1 June 1970 (aged 25)		(Italy) Padova
