= 1993 Copa América squads =

Below are the rosters for the 1993 Copa América tournament in Ecuador, from 15 June to 4 July 1993. The competition featured the debut of two teams (Mexico and the United States) and as a result the tournament format changed to one with three groups of four teams each.

== Group A ==
=== Ecuador ===
Head coach: (Federal Republic of Yugoslavia) Dušan Drašković

No.	Pos.	Player	Date of birth (age)	Caps	Club
1	GK	Jacinto Espinoza	24 November 1969 (aged 23)		(Ecuador) Delfín
2	DF	Jimmy Montanero	24 August 1960 (aged 32)		(Ecuador) Barcelona
3	DF	Hólger Quiñónez	18 September 1962 (aged 30)		(Colombia) Deportivo Pereira
4	DF	Byron Tenorio	14 June 1966 (aged 27)		(Ecuador) Barcelona
5	MF	Héctor Carabalí	15 February 1972 (aged 21)		(Ecuador) Barcelona
6	DF	Luis Capurro	1 May 1961 (aged 32)		(Paraguay) Cerro Porteño
7	FW	Carlos Muñoz	24 October 1967 (aged 25)		(Ecuador) Barcelona
8	MF	Nixon Carcelén	10 February 1969 (aged 24)		(Ecuador) Deportivo Quito
9	FW	Eduardo Hurtado	12 January 1969 (aged 24)		(Chile) Colo-Colo
10	MF	Álex Aguinaga	9 July 1968 (aged 24)		(Mexico) Necaxa
11	FW	Ángel Fernández	2 August 1971 (aged 21)		(Ecuador) Emelec
12	GK	Víctor Mendoza	24 August 1961 (aged 31)		(Ecuador) Barcelona
13	DF	Máximo Tenorio	30 September 1969 (aged 23)		(Ecuador) Emelec
14	FW	Raúl Avilés	17 February 1964 (aged 29)		(Ecuador) Barcelona
15	FW	José Gavica	8 January 1969 (aged 24)		(Ecuador) Barcelona
16	MF	Kléber Chalá	29 June 1971 (aged 21)		(Ecuador) El Nacional
17	MF	Eduardo Zambrano	21 January 1970 (aged 23)		(Ecuador) LDU Quito
18	DF	Dannes Coronel	24 May 1973 (aged 20)		(Ecuador) Emelec
19	MF	Luis Chérrez	19 January 1968 (aged 25)		(Ecuador) El Nacional
20	DF	Iván Hurtado	16 August 1974 (aged 18)		(Ecuador) Emelec
21	DF	José María Guerrero	1 April 1970 (aged 23)		(Ecuador) Barcelona
22	DF	Raúl Noriega	4 January 1970 (aged 23)		(Ecuador) Barcelona

=== United States ===
Head coach: (Federal Republic of Yugoslavia) Bora Milutinović

No.	Pos.	Player	Date of birth (age)	Caps	Club
1	GK	Tony Meola	21 February 1969 (aged 24)		(United States) Buffalo Blizzard
2	DF	Mike Lapper	28 August 1970 (aged 22)		(United States) UCLA Bruins
3	DF	John Doyle	16 March 1966 (aged 27)		(Sweden) Örgryte IS
4	MF	Bruce Murray	25 January 1966 (aged 27)		(England) Millwall
5	DF	Cle Kooiman	4 July 1963 (aged 29)		(Mexico) Cruz Azul
6	MF	Mark Chung	18 June 1970 (aged 22)		(United States) Maryland Bays
7	FW	Peter Woodring	5 February 1968 (aged 25)		(Germany) Hamburger SV
8	MF	Dominic Kinnear	26 July 1967 (aged 25)		(United States) San Francisco Bay Blackhawks
9	MF	Tab Ramos (c)	21 September 1966 (aged 26)		(Spain) Real Betis
10	FW	Peter Vermes	21 November 1966 (aged 26)		(Spain) UE Figueres
11	FW	Jean Harbor	19 September 1965 (aged 27)		(United States) Tampa Bay Rowdies
12	DF	Jeff Agoos	2 May 1968 (aged 25)		(United States) Dallas Sidekicks
13	FW	Cobi Jones	16 June 1970 (aged 22)		(Germany) FC Koln B
14	FW	Joe-Max Moore	23 February 1971 (aged 22)		(United States) UCLA Bruins
15	DF	Desmond Armstrong	2 November 1964 (aged 28)		(United States) Maryland Bays
16	MF	Mike Sorber	14 May 1971 (aged 22)		(United States) St. Louis Billikens
17	GK	Vojislav Stanisic	6 March 1963 (aged 30)		(United States) Kansas City Attack
18	GK	Brad Friedel	18 May 1971 (aged 22)		(United States) UCLA Bruins
19	MF	Chris Henderson	11 December 1970 (aged 22)		(United States) Seattle Storm
20	DF	Paul Caligiuri	9 May 1964 (aged 29)		(Germany) SC Freiburg
21	DF	Fernando Clavijo	23 January 1957 (aged 36)		(United States) St. Louis Storm
22	DF	Alexi Lalas	1 June 1970 (aged 23)		(United States) Scarlet Knights

=== Uruguay ===
Head coach: (Uruguay) Luis Cubilla

No.	Pos.	Player	Date of birth (age)	Caps	Club
1	GK	Robert Siboldi	24 September 1965 (aged 27)	6	(Mexico) Cruz Azul
2	DF	Daniel Sánchez	3 May 1961 (aged 32)	16	(Uruguay) Danubio
3	DF	Fernando Kanapkis	6 June 1966 (aged 27)	6	(Argentina) Deportivo Mandiyú
4	DF	Guillermo Sanguinetti	21 June 1966 (aged 26)	11	(Argentina) Gimnasia y Esgrima La Plata
5	MF	Santiago Ostolaza (c)	10 July 1962 (aged 30)	33	(Mexico) Querétaro
6	DF	Cesilio de los Santos	12 February 1965 (aged 28)	2	(Mexico) América
7	FW	Walter Pelletti	31 May 1966 (aged 27)	5	(Argentina) Huracán
8	MF	Héctor Morán	13 February 1962 (aged 31)	13	(Argentina) Deportivo Mandiyú
9	FW	Hugo Guerra	25 February 1968 (aged 25)	5	(Argentina) Gimnasia y Esgrima La Plata
10	MF	Marcelo Saralegui	18 May 1971 (aged 22)	6	(Italy) Torino
11	FW	Adrián Paz	9 September 1968 (aged 24)	4	(Argentina) Estudiantes de La Plata
12	GK	Oscar Ferro	2 March 1967 (aged 26)	??	(Uruguay) Peñarol
13	DF	Héctor Rodríguez	22 October 1968 (aged 24)	??	(Uruguay) Defensor
14	DF	Eber Moas	21 March 1969 (aged 24)	18	(Argentina) Independiente
15	DF	Nelson Cabrera	18 July 1967 (aged 25)	16	(Uruguay) Danubio
16	MF	Álvaro Gutiérrez	21 July 1967 (aged 25)	11	(Uruguay) Nacional
17	MF	Jorge Barrios	24 January 1961 (aged 32)	??	(Uruguay) Montevideo Wanderers
18	FW	Jorge da Silva	11 December 1961 (aged 31)	22	(Colombia) América de Cali
19	MF	Fabián O'Neill	14 October 1973 (aged 19)	0	(Uruguay) Nacional
20	DF	José Herrera	17 June 1965 (aged 27)	??	(Italy) Cagliari
21	FW	Enzo Francescoli	12 November 1961 (aged 31)	??	(Italy) Cagliari
22	FW	Rubén Sosa	25 April 1966 (aged 27)	32	(Italy) Internazionale

=== Venezuela ===
Head coach: (Federal Republic of Yugoslavia) Ratomir Dujković

No.	Pos.	Player	Date of birth (age)	Caps	Club
1	GK	José Gregorio Gómez	27 November 1963 (aged 29)		(Venezuela) Mineros
2	DF	Carlos García	12 November 1971 (aged 21)		(Venezuela) Táchira
3	DF	Miguel Echenausi	21 February 1968 (aged 25)		(Venezuela) Caracas Fútbol Club
4	DF	Marcos Mathías	15 May 1963 (aged 30)		(Venezuela) Trujillanos
5	MF	Sergío Hernández	31 January 1971 (aged 22)		(Venezuela) Táchira
6	DF	Leonardo Lupi	2 October 1972 (aged 20)		(Venezuela) Trujillanos
7	MF	Leonardo Alberto González	14 July 1972 (aged 20)		(Venezuela) Trujillanos
8	MF	Oswaldo Palencia	1 February 1970 (aged 23)		(Venezuela) Estudiantes de Mérida
9	FW	José Luis Dolgetta	1 August 1970 (aged 22)		(Venezuela) Táchira
10	MF	Wilson Chacón	11 May 1971 (aged 22)		(Venezuela) Táchira
11	MF	Carlos Contreras	17 August 1972 (aged 20)		(Venezuela) Táchira
12	GK	Félix Golindano	16 November 1969 (aged 23)		(Venezuela) Trujillanos
13	DF	Luis Filosa	15 February 1973 (aged 20)		(Venezuela) Mineros
14	DF	Miguel Cordero	10 November 1971 (aged 21)		(Venezuela) Portuguesa Agricultura
15	MF	Ricardo Milillo	19 September 1969 (aged 23)		(Venezuela) Estudiantes de Mérida
16	DF	Alexander Echenique	11 November 1971 (aged 21)		(Venezuela) Táchira
17	FW	Edson Rodríguez	24 July 1970 (aged 22)		(Venezuela) Sport Maritimo
18	FW	Juan Enrique García	16 April 1970 (aged 23)		(Venezuela) Minervén
19	MF	Stalin Rivas	5 August 1971 (aged 21)		(Belgium) K. Boom F.C.
20	DF	Juan Castellanos	7 January 1975 (aged 18)		(Venezuela) Sport Maritimo
22	GK	Rafael Dudamel	7 January 1973 (aged 20)		(Venezuela) Universidad de Los Andes

== Group B ==
=== Brazil ===
Head coach: (Brazil) Carlos Alberto Parreira

Gil Baiano was a late injury replacement for the originally selected Luis Carlos Winck

No.	Pos.	Player	Date of birth (age)	Caps	Club
1	GK	Cláudio Taffarel	8 May 1966 (aged 27)	47	(Italy) Parma
2	DF	Cafú	7 June 1970 (aged 23)	19	(Brazil) São Paulo
3	DF	Antônio Carlos	18 May 1969 (aged 24)	6	(Brazil) Palmeiras
4	DF	Válber	31 May 1967 (aged 26)	5	(Brazil) São Paulo
5	MF	César Sampaio	31 March 1968 (aged 25)	8	(Brazil) Palmeiras
6	DF	Roberto Carlos	10 April 1973 (aged 20)	8	(Brazil) Palmeiras
7	FW	Edmundo	2 April 1971 (aged 22)	4	(Brazil) Palmeiras
8	MF	Boiadeiro	16 June 1965 (aged 27)	1	(Brazil) Cruzeiro
9	FW	Müller (c)	31 January 1966 (aged 27)	40	(Brazil) São Paulo
10	MF	Palhinha	14 December 1967 (aged 25)	5	(Brazil) São Paulo
11	MF	Zinho	17 June 1967 (aged 25)	12	(Brazil) Palmeiras
12	GK	Carlos	4 March 1956 (aged 37)	36	(Brazil) Portuguesa
13	DF	Gil Baiano	3 November 1966 (aged 26)	6	(Brazil) Bragantino
14	MF	Luís Henrique	20 August 1968 (aged 24)	16	(France) Monaco
15	DF	Paulão	25 March 1967 (aged 26)	7	(Brazil) Grêmio
16	MF	Elivélton	31 July 1971 (aged 21)	8	(Brazil) São Paulo
17	MF	Luisinho	17 March 1965 (aged 28)	5	(Brazil) Vasco da Gama
18	MF	Marquinhos	2 October 1971 (aged 21)	0	(Brazil) Flamengo
19	FW	Edílson	17 September 1971 (aged 21)	0	(Brazil) Palmeiras
20	FW	Almir	3 February 1969 (aged 24)	5	(Brazil) Santos
21	FW	Viola	1 January 1969 (aged 24)	0	(Brazil) Corinthians
22	GK	Zetti	10 January 1965 (aged 28)	1	(Brazil) São Paulo
23	DF	Henrique Arlindo Etges	15 March 1966 (aged 27)	0	(Brazil) Corinthians

The player (Nº13)Jose Gildasio Pereira de Matos or Gil Baiano of the Club Bragantino Brazil was replaced due to injury for Luis Carlos Winck of the club Gremio Porto Alegre Brazil before the start of the tournament.

=== Chile ===
Head coach: (Chile) Arturo Salah

No.	Pos.	Player	Date of birth (age)	Caps	Club
1	GK	Patricio Toledo	14 July 1962 (aged 30)	14	(Chile) Universidad Católica
2	DF	Gabriel Mendoza	22 May 1968 (aged 25)	11	(Chile) Colo-Colo
3	DF	Eduardo Vilches	21 April 1963 (aged 30)	17	(Chile) Colo-Colo
4	DF	Javier Margas	10 May 1969 (aged 24)	14	(Chile) Colo-Colo
5	DF	Miguel Ramírez	11 June 1970 (aged 23)	15	(Chile) Colo-Colo
6	MF	Jaime Pizarro	2 March 1964 (aged 29)	49	(Chile) Colo-Colo
7	FW	Richard Zambrano	20 May 1967 (aged 26)	6	Universidad de Chile
8	MF	Mario Lepe	25 March 1963 (aged 30)	16	(Chile) Universidad Católica
9	FW	Iván Zamorano	18 January 1967 (aged 26)	21	(Spain) Real Madrid
10	MF	Fabián Estay	5 October 1968 (aged 24)	19	Universidad de Chile
11	MF	Marcelo Vega	12 August 1971 (aged 21)	6	(Chile) Unión Española
12	GK	Marcelo Ramírez	29 May 1965 (aged 28)	3	(Chile) Colo-Colo
13	DF	Fernando Cornejo	28 November 1969 (aged 23)	3	(Chile) Cobreloa
14	DF	Daniel López	3 June 1969 (aged 24)	0	(Chile) Universidad Católica
15	MF	Luis Musrri	24 December 1969 (aged 23)	5	Universidad de Chile
16	MF	Nelson Parraguez	5 April 1971 (aged 22)	7	(Chile) Universidad Católica
17	MF	Fabián Guevara	22 June 1968 (aged 24)	7	Universidad de Chile
18	DF	Ricardo Gónzalez	31 August 1965 (aged 27)	0	(Chile) Unión Española
19	FW	Marco Antonio Figueroa	21 February 1962 (aged 31)	4	(Chile) Cobreloa
20	MF	José Luis Sierra	5 December 1968 (aged 24)	5	(Chile) Unión Española
21	FW	Juan Castillo	29 October 1970 (aged 22)	3	(Chile) Unión Española
22	FW	Rodrigo Barrera	30 March 1970 (aged 23)	2	(Chile) Universidad Católica

=== Paraguay ===
Head coach: (Paraguay) Alicio Solalinde

No.	Pos.	Player	Date of birth (age)	Caps	Club
1	GK	José Luis Chilavert	27 July 1965 (aged 27)		(Argentina) Vélez Sarsfield
2	DF	Teófilo Barrios	24 July 1964 (aged 28)		(Argentina) Talleres de Córdoba
3	DF	Mario César Ramírez	25 May 1965 (aged 28)		(Paraguay) Olimpia Asunción
4	DF	Celso Ayala	20 August 1970 (aged 22)		(Paraguay) Olimpia Asunción
5	DF	Silvio Suárez	5 January 1969 (aged 24)		(Paraguay) Olimpia Asunción
6	DF	Carlos Gamarra	17 February 1971 (aged 22)		(Paraguay) Cerro Porteño
7	MF	Estanislao Struway	25 June 1968 (aged 24)		(Paraguay) Cerro Porteño
8	MF	Gustavo Sotelo	16 March 1968 (aged 25)		(Paraguay) Cerro Porteño
9	MF	Luis Alberto Monzón	26 May 1970 (aged 23)		(Paraguay) Olimpia Asunción
10	FW	Roberto Cabañas (c)	20 April 1961 (aged 32)		(Argentina) Boca Juniors
11	FW	Carlos Luis Torres	10 March 1968 (aged 25)		(Argentina) Racing Club
12	GK	Derlis Gómez	2 November 1972 (aged 20)		(Paraguay) Club Sol de América
13	DF	Andrés Duarte	4 February 1972 (aged 21)		(Paraguay) Cerro Porteño
14	DF	Juan Ramón Jara	6 August 1970 (aged 22)		(Paraguay) Olimpia Asunción
15	DF	Juan Carlos Villamayor	5 March 1969 (aged 24)		(Chile) Colchagua
16	DF	Vidal Sanabria	11 April 1967 (aged 26)		(Paraguay) Olimpia Asunción
17	MF	Roberto Acuña	25 March 1972 (aged 21)		(Paraguay) Club Nacional
18	FW	Jorge Amado Nunes	18 October 1961 (aged 31)		(Peru) Universitario de Deportes
19	MF	Gabriel González	18 March 1961 (aged 32)		(Paraguay) Olimpia Asunción
20	MF	Virgilio Ferreira	28 January 1973 (aged 20)		(Paraguay) Cerro Porteño
21	FW	Marcial Garay	29 April 1968 (aged 25)		(Paraguay) Olimpia Asunción
22	GK	Celso Guerrero	17 April 1972 (aged 21)		(Paraguay) Club Libertad

=== Peru ===
Head coach: (Federal Republic of Yugoslavia) Vladimir Popović

No.	Pos.	Player	Date of birth (age)	Caps	Club
1	GK	Miguel Miranda	13 August 1966 (aged 26)		(Peru) Sporting Cristal
2	DF	Jorge Soto	27 October 1971 (aged 21)		(Peru) Sporting Cristal
3	DF	Juan Reynoso	28 December 1969 (aged 23)		(Peru) Universitario de Deportes
4	DF	Percy Olivares	5 June 1968 (aged 25)		(Peru) Sporting Cristal
5	DF	José Soto	11 January 1970 (aged 23)		(Peru) Alianza Lima
6	MF	José Luis Carranza	8 January 1964 (aged 29)		(Peru) Universitario de Deportes
7	FW	Flavio Maestri	21 January 1973 (aged 20)		(Peru) Sporting Cristal
8	MF	José del Solar	28 November 1967 (aged 25)		(Spain) Tenerife
9	DF	Andrés González	8 April 1968 (aged 25)		(Peru) Universitario de Deportes
10	FW	Pablo Zegarra	1 April 1973 (aged 20)		(Peru) Sporting Cristal
11	FW	Julio César Rivera	12 April 1967 (aged 26)		(Peru) Sporting Cristal
12	GK	Juan Carlos Zubczuk	31 March 1965 (aged 28)		(Peru) Universitario de Deportes
13	FW	Mario Rodríguez	18 March 1972 (aged 21)		(Peru) Alianza Lima
14	MF	Roberto Martínez	3 December 1967 (aged 25)		(Peru) Universitario de Deportes
15	MF	Roberto Palacios	28 December 1972 (aged 20)		(Peru) Sporting Cristal
16	DF	César Charún	25 October 1970 (aged 22)		(Peru) Universitario de Deportes
17	DF	Darío Muchotrigo	17 December 1970 (aged 22)		(Peru) Alianza Lima
18	MF	Alvaro Barco	27 June 1967 (aged 25)		(Chile) Cobreloa
19	MF	Germán Carty	16 July 1968 (aged 24)		(Peru) Sport Boys
20	FW	Waldir Sáenz	15 May 1973 (aged 20)		(Peru) Alianza Lima
21	GK	Agapito Rodríguez	16 March 1965 (aged 28)		(Peru) Alianza Lima

== Group C ==
=== Argentina ===
Head coach: (Argentina) Alfio Basile

No.	Pos.	Player	Date of birth (age)	Caps	Club
1	GK	Sergio Goycochea	17 October 1963 (aged 29)		(Paraguay) Olimpia Asunción
2	DF	Sergio Vázquez	23 November 1965 (aged 27)		(Chile) Universidad Católica
3	DF	Ricardo Altamirano	12 December 1965 (aged 27)		(Argentina) River Plate
4	DF	Fabián Basualdo	26 February 1964 (aged 29)		(Argentina) River Plate
5	MF	Fernando Redondo	6 June 1969 (aged 24)		(Spain) Tenerife
6	DF	Oscar Ruggeri (c)	26 January 1962 (aged 31)		(Mexico) América
7	FW	Ramón Medina Bello	29 April 1966 (aged 27)		(Argentina) River Plate
8	FW	Darío Franco	17 January 1969 (aged 24)		(Spain) Real Zaragoza
23	MF	Jose Basualdo	20 June 1963 (aged 29)		(Argentina) Velez Sarsfield
9	FW	Gabriel Batistuta	1 February 1969 (aged 24)		(Italy) Fiorentina
10	MF	Diego Simeone	28 April 1970 (aged 23)		(Spain) Sevilla
11	MF	Néstor Gorosito	14 May 1964 (aged 29)		(Argentina) San Lorenzo
12	GK	Luis Islas	22 December 1965 (aged 27)		(Argentina) Independiente
13	DF	Fernando Cáceres	7 February 1969 (aged 24)		(Argentina) River Plate
14	DF	Néstor Craviotto	3 October 1963 (aged 29)		(Argentina) Independiente
15	DF	Jorge Borelli	2 November 1964 (aged 28)		(Argentina) Racing Club
16	FW	Claudio García	24 August 1963 (aged 29)		(Argentina) Racing Club
17	MF	Gustavo Zapata	15 October 1967 (aged 25)		(Argentina) River Plate
18	FW	Alberto Acosta	23 August 1966 (aged 26)		(Argentina) Boca Juniors
19	FW	Julio Alberto Zamora	11 March 1966 (aged 27)		(Argentina) Newell's Old Boys
20	MF	Leonardo Rodríguez	27 August 1966 (aged 26)		(Italy) Atalanta
21	GK	Norberto Scoponi	13 January 1961 (aged 32)		(Argentina) Newell's Old Boys
22	MF	Alejandro Mancuso	4 September 1968 (aged 24)		(Argentina) Boca Juniors

Because of the lesion suffered by Darío Franco in Argentina's first match against Bolivia (rupture of tibia and fibula), the CSF authorized to replace him; the coach chose to include José Horacio Basualdo.

=== Bolivia ===
Head coach: (Spain) Xabier Azkargorta

No.	Pos.	Player	Date of birth (age)	Caps	Club
1	GK	Dario Rojas	20 January 1961 (aged 32)		(Bolivia) Oriente Petrolero
2	DF	Juan Manuel Peña	17 January 1973 (aged 20)		(Bolivia) Blooming
3	DF	Marco Sandy	29 August 1971 (aged 21)		(Bolivia) Bolivar
4	DF	Miguel Rimba	1 November 1967 (aged 25)		(Bolivia) Bolivar
5	DF	Gustavo Quinteros	15 February 1965 (aged 28)		(Bolivia) Club San José
6	MF	Carlos Borja	25 December 1965 (aged 27)		(Bolivia) Bolivar
7	FW	Johnny Villarroel	11 August 1968 (aged 24)	1	(Bolivia) The Strongest
8	MF	José Melgar	20 September 1959 (aged 33)		(Bolivia) The Strongest
9	FW	Álvaro Peña	11 February 1966 (aged 27)		(Chile) Deportes Temuco
10	FW	Marco Etcheverry	26 September 1970 (aged 22)		(Bolivia) Bolivar
11	FW	Jaime Moreno	19 January 1974 (aged 19)		(Bolivia) Blooming
12	GK	Marcelo Torrico	11 January 1972 (aged 21)		(Bolivia) The Strongest
13	DF	Modesto Soruco	12 February 1966 (aged 27)		(Bolivia) Blooming
14	MF	Juan Carlos Ríos	11 May 1972 (aged 21)		(Bolivia) Atlético Ciclón
15	DF	Roberto Pérez	17 April 1960 (aged 33)		(Bolivia) Club San José
16	MF	Luis Cristaldo	31 August 1969 (aged 23)		(Bolivia) Oriente Petrolero
17	FW	William Ramallo	4 July 1961 (aged 31)		(Bolivia) Club Destroyers
18	DF	Miguel Ángel Noro	22 August 1961 (aged 31)		(Bolivia) Club Destroyers
19	FW	Iván Castillo	11 July 1970 (aged 22)		(Bolivia) Bolivar
20	FW	Ramiro Castillo	27 March 1966 (aged 27)		(Argentina) Platense
21	MF	Erwin Sánchez	19 October 1969 (aged 23)		(Portugal) Boavista
22	FW	Julio César Baldivieso	2 December 1971 (aged 21)		(Bolivia) Bolivar

=== Colombia ===
Head coach: (Colombia) Francisco Maturana

No.	Pos.	Player	Date of birth (age)	Caps	Club
1	GK	Óscar Córdoba	3 February 1970 (aged 23)		(Colombia) Once Caldas
2	DF	Óscar Cortés	19 October 1968 (aged 24)		(Colombia) Millonarios
3	DF	Alexis Mendoza	8 November 1961 (aged 31)		(Colombia) Atlético Junior
4	DF	Luis Fernando Herrera	12 June 1962 (aged 31)		(Colombia) Atlético Nacional
5	MF	Hermán Gaviria	27 November 1969 (aged 23)		(Colombia) Atlético Nacional
6	MF	Gabriel Gómez	8 December 1959 (aged 33)		(Colombia) Atlético Nacional
7	FW	Orlando Maturana	11 October 1965 (aged 27)		(Colombia) América Cali
8	MF	Alexis García	21 July 1960 (aged 32)		(Colombia) Atlético Nacional
9	FW	Víctor Aristizábal	9 December 1971 (aged 21)		(Colombia) Atlético Nacional
10	MF	Carlos Valderrama (c)	2 September 1961 (aged 31)		(Colombia) Atlético Junior
11	FW	Adolfo Valencia	6 February 1968 (aged 25)		(Colombia) Independiente Santa Fe
12	GK	Farid Mondragón	21 June 1971 (aged 21)		(Paraguay) Cerro Porteño
13	MF	Víctor Pacheco	24 September 1972 (aged 20)		(Colombia) Atlético Junior
14	MF	Leonel Álvarez	29 July 1965 (aged 27)		(Colombia) América Cali
15	DF	Luis Carlos Perea	29 December 1963 (aged 29)		(Colombia) Independiente Medellín
16	MF	John Harold Lozano	30 March 1972 (aged 21)		(Colombia) América Cali
17	FW	Faustino Asprilla	10 November 1969 (aged 23)		(Italy) Parma
18	DF	Diego Osorio	21 July 1970 (aged 22)		(Colombia) Atlético Nacional
19	MF	Freddy Rincón	14 August 1966 (aged 26)		(Colombia) América Cali
20	DF	Wilson Pérez	9 August 1967 (aged 25)		(Colombia) América Cali
21	FW	Ricardo Pérez	21 July 1973 (aged 19)		(Colombia) Millonarios
22	GK	José María Pazo	4 April 1964 (aged 29)		(Colombia) Atlético Junior

=== Mexico ===
Head coach: (Mexico) Miguel Mejía Barón

No.	Pos.	Player	Date of birth (age)	Caps	Club
1	GK	Jorge Campos	15 October 1966 (aged 26)		(Mexico) UNAM Pumas
2	DF	Claudio Suárez	17 December 1968 (aged 24)		(Mexico) UNAM Pumas
3	DF	Juan Ramírez Perales	8 March 1969 (aged 24)		(Mexico) UNAM Pumas
4	MF	Ignacio Ambríz	7 February 1965 (aged 28)		(Mexico) Necaxa
5	MF	Ramón Ramírez	5 December 1969 (aged 23)		(Mexico) Santos Laguna
6	DF	Miguel Herrera	18 February 1968 (aged 25)		(Mexico) Atlante
7	MF	David Patiño	6 September 1967 (aged 25)		(Mexico) UNAM Pumas
8	MF	Alberto García Aspe	11 May 1967 (aged 26)		(Mexico) Necaxa
9	FW	Hugo Sánchez (c)	11 July 1958 (aged 34)		(Mexico) América
10	FW	Luis García	1 June 1969 (aged 24)		(Spain) Atlético Madrid
11	FW	Luís Roberto Alves	23 May 1967 (aged 26)		(Mexico) América
12	GK	Alejandro García	26 January 1961 (aged 32)		(Mexico) América
13	MF	Miguel España	4 April 1961 (aged 32)		(Mexico) UNAM Pumas
14	MF	Carlos Turrubiates	24 January 1968 (aged 25)		(Mexico) León
15	FW	Luis Flores	18 July 1961 (aged 31)		(Mexico) Atlas
16	DF	Juan Hernández	8 March 1965 (aged 28)		(Mexico) América
17	MF	Benjamín Galindo	11 December 1960 (aged 32)		(Mexico) Guadalajara
18	DF	Guillermo Muñoz	20 October 1961 (aged 31)		(Mexico) Monterrey
19	FW	Daniel Guzmán	31 December 1965 (aged 27)		(Mexico) Atlante
20	DF	Abraham Nava	23 January 1964 (aged 29)		(Mexico) Necaxa
21	DF	Raúl Gutiérrez	16 October 1966 (aged 26)		(Mexico) Atlante
22	GK	Nicolás Navarro	17 February 1963 (aged 30)		(Mexico) Necaxa
