= List of Venezuela international footballers =

The Venezuela national football team has represented Venezuela in international football since 1937. Organized by the Venezuelan Football Federation (Spanish: Federación Venezolana de Fútbol), it is one of the 10 members of CONMEBOL. The team's first international was a 2–1 defeat to Panama on 12 February 1938 in the Central American and Caribbean Games.

Only players with 20 or more official caps are included in this list.

== Players ==
Key
§	Player is active with Venezuela and has been called up to the squad within the last 12 months
**Bold**	Player is still active to be called-up

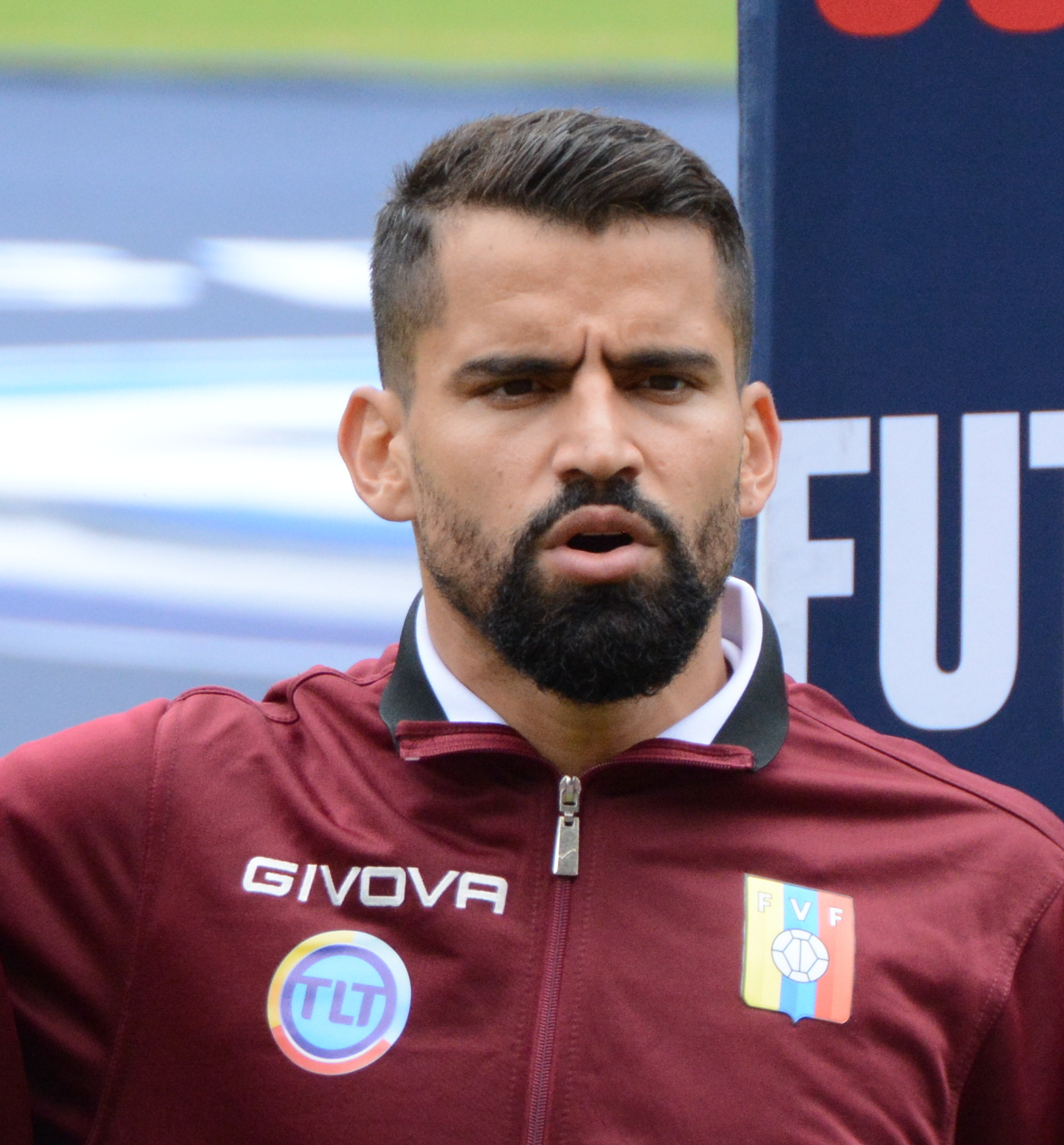
Tomás Rincón is Venezuela's most capped international of all time with 143 caps.

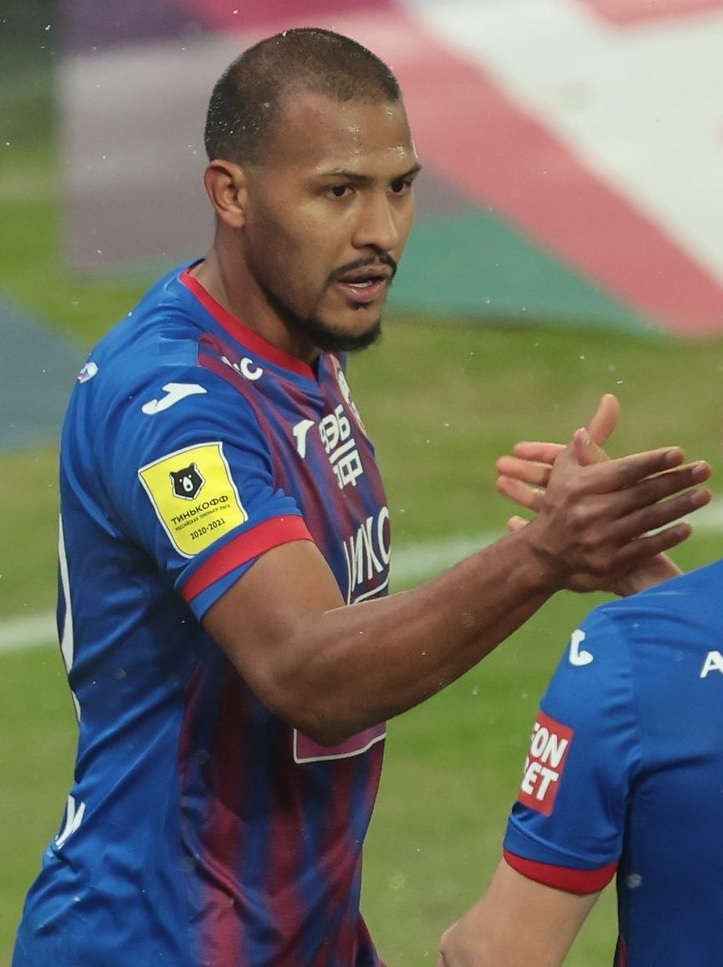
Salomón Rondón is Venezuela's top goalscorer with 50 goals from 122 caps.

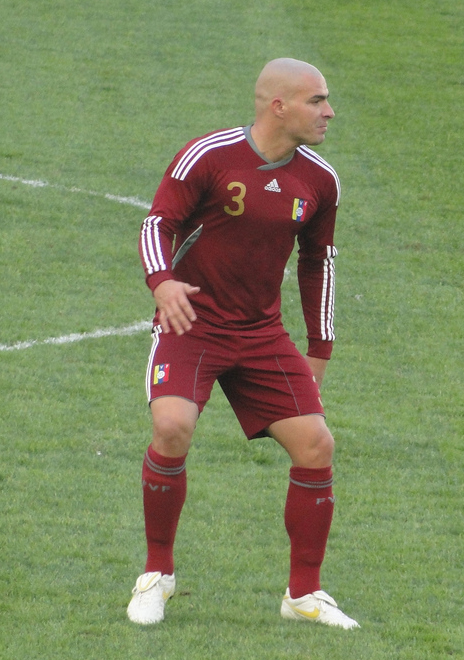
José Manuel Rey (115 caps, 11 goals) is the first player to earn 100 caps for Venezuela.

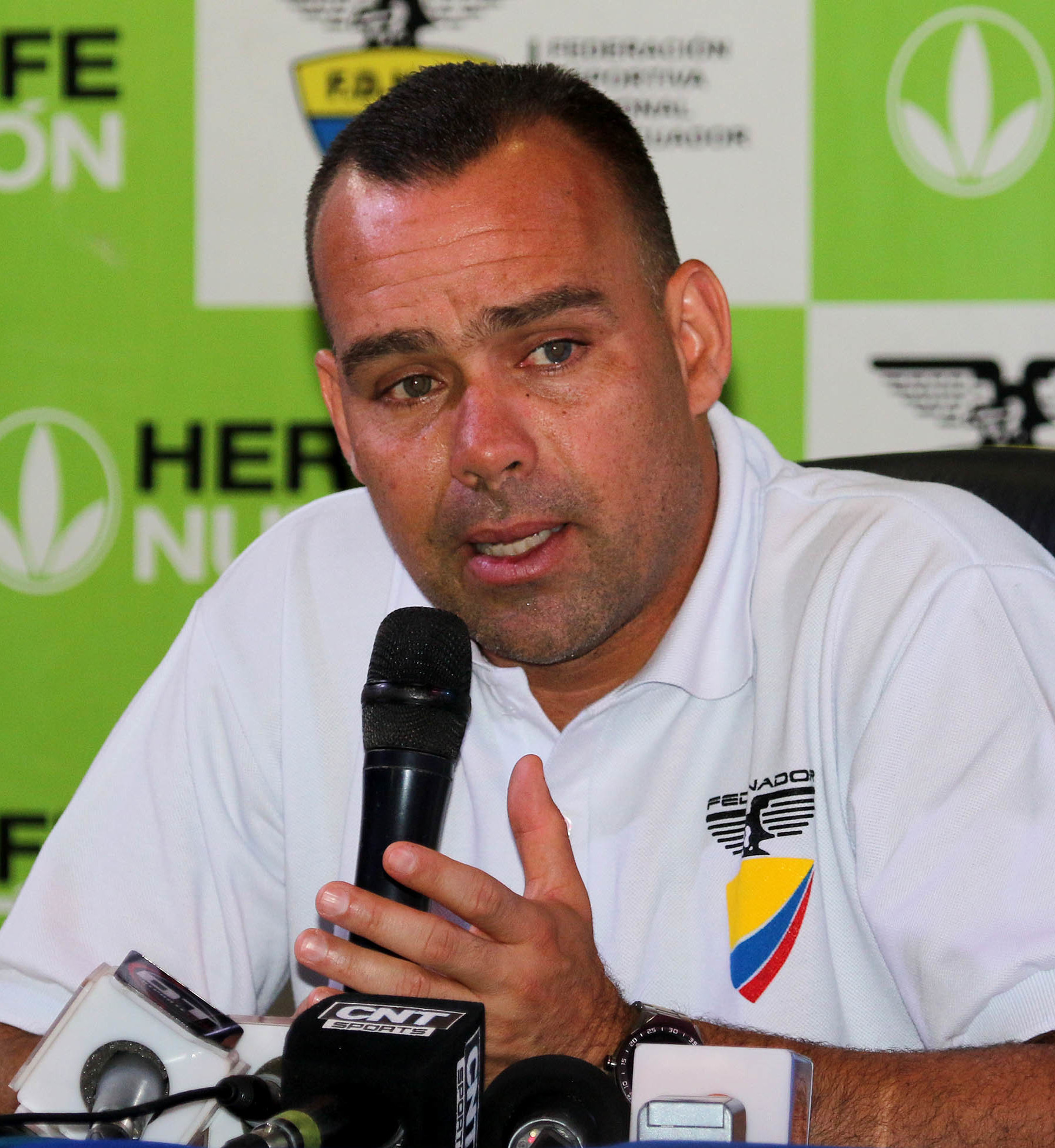
Rafael Dudamel (55 caps, 1 goals) is the only goalkeeper who has scored a goal for Venezuela.

Player	Caps	Goals	National career
**Tomás Rincón**	143	1	2008–2025
Juan Arango	129	23	1999–2015
**Salomón Rondón**	122	50	2008–2026
José Manuel Rey	115	11	1997–2011
**Roberto Rosales**	96	1	2007–2025
Jorge Rojas	91	3	1999–2009
Miguel Mea Vitali	85	1	1999–2012
Oswaldo Vizcarrondo	80	7	2004–2016
Gabriel Urdaneta	77	9	1996–2005
Luis Vallenilla	77	1	1996–2007
**Alexander González**	75	2	2011–2025
**Josef Martínez**	70	15	2011–2025
Luis Manuel Seijas	70	2	2006–2019
Ruberth Morán	66	14	1996–2007
Giancarlo Maldonado	65	22	2003–2011
Ricardo Páez	64	7	2000–2007
Gabriel Cichero	64	4	2004–2015
Leopoldo Jiménez	64	0	1999–2005
César González	63	5	2004–2015
Franklin Lucena	62	2	2007–2015
Renny Vega	62	0	1999–2013
Alejandro Guerra	59	3	2006–2017
Leonel Vielma	58	4	2000–2008
Rafael Dudamel	55	1	1993–2010
Nicolás Fedor "Miku"	53	11	2006–2011
Héctor González	53	4	2001–2007
**Yeferson Soteldo**	53	4	2016–2025
Luis Vera	53	2	1996–2007
**Darwin Machís**	52	11	2011–2024
**Rómulo Otero**	52	7	2013–2024
Juan García	51	7	1993–2010
**Jefferson Savarino**	51	4	2017–2026
**Cristian Cásseres Jr.**	50	1	2020–2026
Alexander Rondón	48	5	1999–2010
**Jhon Murillo**	48	4	2015–2025
**Yangel Herrera**	47	3	2016–2026
Alejandro Cichero	47	2	2002–2007
**Nahuel Ferraresi**	47	1	2018–2026
Gilberto Angelucci	47	0	1995–2005
**Wilker Ángel**	46	2	2014–2025
Grenddy Perozo	46	2	2006–2014
**Wuilker Faríñez**	42	0	2016–2025
Alejandro Moreno	41	3	2004–2012
**José Martínez**	41	0	2021–2025
**Júnior Moreno**	40	1	2017–2023
Edson Tortolero	39	3	1993–2006
Leonardo González	39	0	1993–2008
Daniel Noriega	38	5	1996–2005
**Yordan Osorio**	38	0	2017–2026
**Jhon Chancellor**	37	3	2017–2023
Giacomo Di Giorgi	37	0	2002–2012
Wilfredo Alvarado	36	2	1997–2008
**Rafael Romo**	36	0	2008–2025
**Ronald Hernández**	35	1	2017–2025
Stalin Rivas	34	3	1989–1996
Pedro Acosta	34	2	1979–1989
Elvis Martínez	33	0	1993–2002
Daniel "Dani" Hernández	32	0	2010–2016
Daniel Arismendi	31	11	2006–2011
**Mikel Villanueva**	31	2	2016–2022
Sergio Hernández	31	0	1993–1996
Luis Filosa	30	0	1993–2000
Giovanny Pérez	30	0	1997–2007
**Juan Pablo Añor "Juanpi"**	29	1	2014–2025
Fernando Aristeguieta	29	1	2010–2022
Jonay Hernández	29	0	2003–2008
**José Manuel "Sema" Velázquez**	28	3	2008–2021
Cristian Cásseres	28	2	1999–2008
Miguel Echenausi	28	2	1991–2000
**Francisco Flores**	28	1	2008–2017
Juan Fuenmayor	28	0	2005–2015
Rolf Feltscher	27	0	2011–2021
Leonardo "Leo" Morales	27	0	2000–2014
Fernando de Ornelas	26	5	1999–2007
**Eduard Bello**	26	4	2018–2025
**Arquímedes Figuera**	26	1	2012–2019
David McIntosh	26	0	1996–1999
Pedro Febles	25	5	1979–1989
Gerson Díaz	25	1	1993–1997
**Yohandry Orozco**	25	1	2010–2014
Luis Mendoza	24	4	1965–1979
Giovanni Savarese	24	4	1989–2001
**Jon Aramburu**	24	1	2023–2026
Héctor Rivas	24	1	1987–1995
Ágnel Flores	24	0	2010–2018
Carlos García	24	0	1993–1997
René Torres	23	2	1981–1989
Gerzon Chacón	23	0	1999–2009
**Miguel Navarro**	23	0	2022–2025
Andrés Rouga	23	0	2002–2012
Rafael Castellín	22	5	1996–2005
Edson Rodríguez	22	0	1993–1996
José Luis Dolgetta	21	6	1993–1997
Ronald Vargas	21	3	2008–2015
César Baena	21	0	1983–2002
Nelson Carrero	21	0	1981–1989
William González	21	0	1995–1997
Carlos Maldonado	20	4	1985–1991
**Telasco Segovia**	20	2	2022–2026
Fréderic "Freddy" Elie	20	1	1964–1977
**José Luis Granados**	20	1	2008–2011
Rolando Álvarez	20	0	1999–2001
**Adalberto Peñaranda**	20	0	2016–2022
Asdrúbal Sánchez	20	0	1979–1987

== See also ==
- Football in Venezuela
