= Cichero =

Cichero is an Italian surname. Notable people with the surname include:

== People ==
- Alejandro Cichero (born 1977), Venezuelan football centre-back
- Alejandro Cichero (footballer, born 2006), Venezuelan football forward for Frosinone
- Estadio Camilo Cichero, former name of La Bombonera, stadium in Buenos Aires, Argentina
- Federico Cichero (born 1983), Argentine cross-country skier
- Gabriel Cichero (born 1984), Argentine football centre-back
- Mauro Cichero (footballer, born 1951), Venezuelan football centre-back
- Mauro Cichero (footballer, born 1995), Venezuelan football midfielder
