= List of Venezuela international footballers born outside Venezuela =

This is a list of football players who have represented the Venezuela national football team in international football since 1938 and were born outside Venezuela.

== List of Players ==
The following players:

1. have played at least one game for the full (senior male) Venezuela national team since 1938; and
2. were born outside Venezuela.

This list includes players who have dual citizenship with Venezuela and/or have become naturalised Venezuelan citizens. The players are ordered per modern-day country of birth.

List of players
Country of birth	Player	Caps	Goals	Period
Argentina	Héctor Bidoglio	16	0	1999–2000
Argentina	Ramón Echenausi	2	0	1977–1981
Argentina	Juan José Scarpeccio	4	0	1981
Colombia	Jaime Bustamante	5	0	2010
Colombia	José Francisco Nieto	2	0	1987
Croatia (then Yugoslavia)	Zdenko Morovic	5	0	1987–1989
Haiti	Fréderic "Freddy" Elie	20	1	1964–1977
Italy	Mauro Cichero	9	0	1980
Italy	Vito Fassano	5	0	1967–1969
Italy	**Alessandro Milani**	3	0	2025–
Italy	Augusto Nitti	2	0	1969
Italy	**Ernesto Torregrossa**	5	2	2022–2023
Spain	Juan "Johnny" Arocha	?	?	1965
Spain	Emilio Campos	17	0	1979–1985
Spain	Pedro Castro	7	0	1975–1981
Spain	Salvador Delgado	2	0	1969
Spain	Manuel García "Curro"	1	0	1969
Spain	Rafael "Rafa" Ponzo	2	0	2004–2006
Spain	**Teo Quintero**	8	0	2025–
Spain	Antonio Ravelo	7+	2+	1962–1969
Spain	Manuel Sánchez "Barre Barre"	2	0	1969
Spain	Rafael Santana	8	3	1967–1979
Spain	Juan José "Cheché" Vidal	13	0	1978–1982
Switzerland	Frank Feltscher	14	2	2011–2014
Switzerland	Rolf Feltscher	27	0	2011–2021
Uruguay	Víctor Filomeno	2	0	1981
Uruguay	Carlos Maldonado	20	4	1985–1991
Uruguay	Gabriel Miranda	17	3	1994–1997

=== Players with only youth caps ===
- Yiandro Raap (born in Hook of Holland, Netherlands) (2026–)

== See also ==
- List of Venezuela international footballers
