= Arbiza =

Arbiza is a Spanish surname. Notable people with the surname include:

- Antonio Montero Arbiza (1882–?), Spanish painter
- Bernardo de Arbiza y Ugarte (1692–1756), Peruvian lawyer, magistrate, and cleric
- Claudio Arbiza (born 1967), retired Uruguayan footballer
- Marcial Arbiza (1914–1992), Spanish industrial engineer and footballer
- Mauro Arbiza (born 1968), Uruguayan visual artist, painter, and sculptor
- Nicolás Arbiza (born 1992), Uruguayan footballer
