= Mauro Cichero =

Mauro Cichero may refer to:

- Mauro Cichero (footballer, born 1951), Italian-born Venezuelan footballer who played as a central defender
- Mauro Cichero (footballer, born 1995), Venezuelan soccer player and son of the above Mauro Cichero, currently playing for Charleston Battery in the United States
