= Lupi =

Lupi may refer to:

== People ==
- Alessandro Lupi (born 1970), Italian former professional football manager and former player
- Carlos Lupi (born 1957), Brazilian professor and politician
- Daniel Lupi (born 1961), American film producer
- Darrin Zammit Lupi (born 1968), Maltese photographer and journalist
- Didier Lupi Second (c.1520-after 1559), French composer
- Dov Lupi (born 1948), Israeli-American gymnast
- Francisco Lupi (1920–1954), Portuguese chess master
- Giorgia Lupi (born 1981), Italian information designer
- Giovanni Lupi, commonly known as Nino, (1908–1990), Swiss footballer
- Giuseppe Lupi (1894, date of death unknown), Italian gymnast
- Ignazio Lupi (1867–1942), Italian actor and film director
- Italo Lupi (1934–2023), Italian graphic designer and writer
- Johannes Lupi (c. 1506–1539), Franco-Flemish composer
- Leonardo Lupi (born 1972), Venezuelan footballer
- Maurizio Lupi (born 1959), Italian politician
- Miguel Ângelo Lupi (1826–1883), Portuguese painter and art professor
- Roberto Lupi (1908–1971), Italian composer, conductor, and music theorist
- Roldano Lupi (1909–1989), Italian film actor
- Tomás Verón Lupi (born 2000), Argentine professional footballer
- Walter Lupi (born 1960), Italian guitarist

== Astronomy ==
- Any of several stars in the constellation Lupus

== Other ==
- Lupi, Camarines Sur
- Lupeol synthase, an enzyme
- A.S. Roma, a football club known as i Lupi (Italian for "the Wolves")
- A.S. Avellino 1912, a football club known as i Lupi
- Piacenza Calcio, a football club, known as i Lupi
- Lu Pi or Lupi, a village in Kachin State, Myanmar
- Lowest Unique Positive Integer (LUPI) game, won by the player selecting in secret the smallest positive whole number that no one else has
