= Alberto Ramírez =

Alberto Ramírez may refer to:

- Alberto Ramírez (footballer, born 1941), Peruvian footballer
- Alberto Ramírez (footballer, born 1968), Peruvian footballer
- Alberto Ramírez (Mexican footballer) (born 1986)
