= Michele Foglia =

Italian footballer

Personal information
- Date of birth: 30 January 1998 (age 28)
- Place of birth: Milan, Italy
- Height: 1.82 m (6 ft 0 in)
- Position: Midfielder

Team information
- Current team: FC Paradiso
- Number: 30

Youth career
- Inter Milan
- –2015: Varese
- 2015–2018: Pro Vercelli

Senior career*
Years	Team	Apps	(Gls)
2017–2018	→ Chieri (loan)		
2018–2020	Pro Vercelli	15	(0)
2020	Arezzo	0	(0)
2021	Atletico Terme Fiuggi	19	(3)
2021–2022	Chieri	12	(1)
2022–	FC Paradiso	68	(7)
- * Club domestic league appearances and goals as of 22 June 2025

Michele Foglia (born 30 January 1998) is an Italian footballer who plays as a midfielder for Swiss Promotion League club FC Paradiso.

== Career ==
=== Pro Vercelli ===
Foglia began his career at Pro Vercelli, graduating from the club's youth academy in 2018. Although he had been included in matchday squads as early as January 2016, Foglia made his first-team debut in September 2018, appearing as a late-game substitute for Leonardo Gatto in a 3–2 victory over Albissole. He made 15 league appearances for the club before departing the club in 2020.

=== Arezzo ===
In January 2020, Foglia moved to Arezzo of Serie C. During his brief stint with the club, Foglia made zero first-team appearances.

=== Serie D ===
On 15 January 2021, he joined Serie D club Atletico Terme Fiuggi. In July 2021, he then moved to Chieri.
