= List of Peru international footballers born outside Peru =

This is a list of football players who have represented the Peru national football team in international football since 1927 and were born outside Peru.

== List of Players ==
The following players:

1. have played at least one game for the full (senior male) Peru national team since 1927; and
2. were born outside Peru.

This list includes players who have dual citizenship with Peru and/or have become naturalised Peruvian citizens. The players are ordered per modern-day country of birth.

List of players
Country of birth	Player	Caps	Goals	Period
Argentina	Horacio Ballesteros	2	0	1976
Argentina	**Horacio Calcaterra**	10	0	2018–2024
Argentina	Óscar Ibáñez	50	0	1998–2005
Argentina	Ramón Quiroga	40	0	1977–1985
Argentina	Gustavo Tempone	5	0	2000–2001
Argentina	**Benjamín Ubierna**	3	0	2014
Brazil	Julinho	12	2	1996–1997
Colombia	Roberto Mosquera	16	4	1978–1981
Denmark	**Oliver Sonne**	20	0	2024–
Ecuador	**Jairo Vélez**	8	5	2026–
Germany	**Felipe Chávez**	1	0	2025–
Germany	**Fabio Gruber**	6	0	2025–
Italy	**Gianluca Lapadula**	45	11	2017–
Japan	**Kenji Cabrera**	8	0	2025–
Japan	**Erick Noriega**	14	0	2024–
Mexico	**Santiago Ormeño**	13	0	2021–
Paraguay	**Franco Zanelatto**	6	0	2023–
Spain	**Cristian Benavente**	19	2	2013–2019
United States	Rafael Quesada	3	0	1993–1996
Uruguay	Julio César Balerio	17	0	1996–1997
Uruguay	**Gabriel Costa**	12	0	2019–2022
Venezuela	**Carlos Ascues**	26	5	2014–2024
Venezuela	George Forsyth	7	0	2007–2014

== See also ==
- List of Peru international footballers
