= Alejandro Cichero (footballer, born 2006) =

Venezuelan footballer

Personal information
- Full name: Alejandro Gabriel Cichero Terrero
- Date of birth: 11 July 2006 (age 20)
- Place of birth: Caracas, Venezuela
- Height: 1.96 m (6 ft 5 in)
- Position: Forward

Team information
- Current team: Paradiso (on loan from Frosinone)
- Number: 29

Youth career
- Deportivo La Guaira
- 2018–2023: Boston River
- 2023–2024: Frosinone

Senior career*
Years	Team	Apps	(Gls)
2024–	Frosinone	5	(0)
2026–	→ Paradiso (loan)	2	(1)

International career^{‡}
2023	Venezuela U17	8	(2)
2025	Venezuela U20	2	(0)
- * Club domestic league appearances and goals as of 26 September 2026 ‡ National team caps and goals as of 21:05, 26 July 2026 (UTC)

Alejandro Gabriel Cichero Terrero (born 11 July 2006) is a Venezuelan professional footballer who plays as a forward for Promotion League club Paradiso, on loan from Serie A club Frosinone.

== Club career ==
Cichero began playing football with Deportivo La Guaira in his native Venezuela, before moving to Uruguay in 2018 where he played for Boston River. He joined the Italian club Frosinone on 30 August 2023 to finish his development. Cichero made his senior debut with Frosinone as a substitute in a 2–0 Serie B loss to Reggiana on 20 October 2024. On 2 July 2025, he extended his contract with Frosinone.

== International career ==
Cichero was a member of the Venezuela U17 side that played at the 2023 FIFA U-17 World Cup. He was called up to the Venezuela U20s for the 2025 South American U-20 Championship.

== Personal life ==
Cichero is the son of international Alejandro Sr, the nephew of former international Gabriel Cichero and of footballer Mauro Jr, and the grandson of Mauro Sr, who captained Venezuela at the 1980 Summer Olympics. Through his father, he is of Italian and Polish descent.
