= Miguel Cordero =

Miguel Cordero is the name of:

- Miguel Cordero del Campillo (1925–2020), Spanish veterinarian and politician
- Miguel Ángel Cordero (born 1987), Spanish footballer
- Miguel Cordero (Venezuelan footballer) (born 1971), Venezuelan footballer
- Miguel Febres Cordero (1854–1910), Ecuadorian Roman Catholic religious brother
- Miguel Alonso Cordero (born 1952), Cuban wrestler
