= Ubillús =

Ubillús is a surname. Notable people with the surname include:

- Alexis Ubillús (born 1972), Peruvian footballer
- Sergio Ubillús (born 1980), Peruvian footballer
- Shassia Ubillús (born 1983), Panamanian model
