= William González =

William González may refer to:

- William González (fencer)
- William González (footballer)
- William Elliott Gonzales, United States ambassador
