= Roberto Dalla Vecchia =

Italian guitarist, composer, and singer

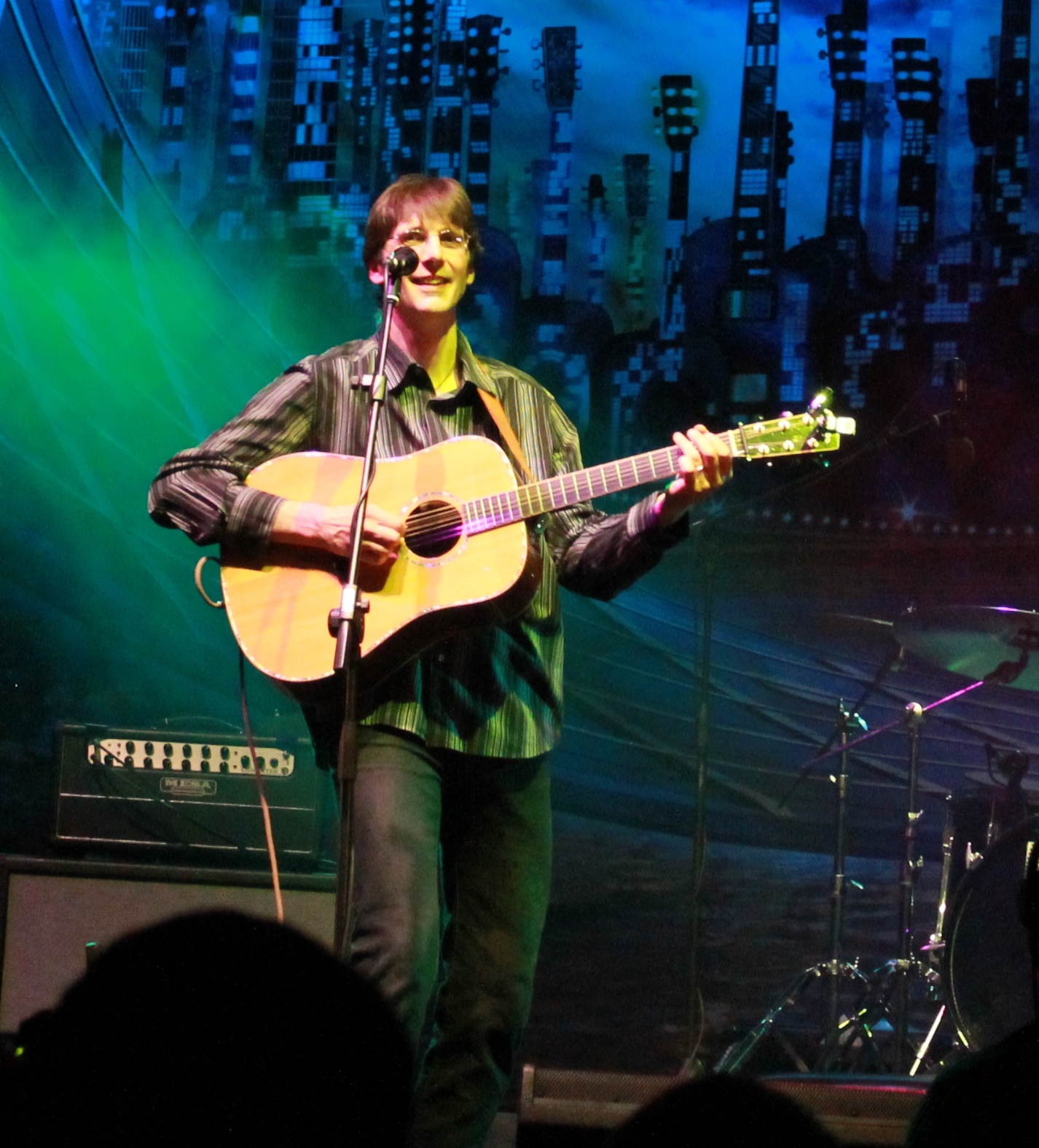
- Dalla Vecchia performing at the Soave Guitar Festival, Italy, April 2012

Background information
- Born: 5 January 1968 (age 58); Vicenza, Italy
- Genres: Acoustic, bluegrass
- Occupations: Musician, composer, singer
- Instrument: Acoustic guitar
- Years active: 1998–present
- Website: www.robertodallavecchia.com

Roberto Dalla Vecchia (born 5 January 1968) is an Italian guitarist, composer, and singer. He is known for his expressive melodies and songs which include many references to traditional American music and bluegrass.

== Biography ==
Dalla Vecchia was born in Vicenza, Italy. He began studying classic piano with his mother, a piano teacher, but soon switched to acoustic guitar. Influenced by American old-time music and bluegrass, he learnt flatpicking by listening to its exponents such as Clarence White, Tony Rice and Doc Watson. He also took lessons from the Italian guitarist and flatpicker Beppe Gambetta. Dalla Vecchia released his first solo album Open Spaces in 1998. In 2003, he won Acoustic Guitar magazine's "Homegrown CD" Award for his second album Sit Back. He currently performs at concerts and festivals and teaches workshops throughout Europe and USA, and runs his own Acoustic Guitar Workshop in Recoaro, Italy, every year and he is the promoter of "vicenzAcustica in Vicenza, his home town, an annual concert featuring international guitarists. Since 2012, he is the director of the "orchestrAcustica", a flatpicking orchestra of 25 guitarists.

Dalla Vecchia has performed with artists such as Tommy Emmanuel, Frank Vignola, Jim Hurst, Mark Cosgrove, Clive Carroll, Jacques Stotzem, Tony McManus, Walter Lupi, Massimo Varini and others.

== Discography ==
=== Studio albums ===
- 1998 – Open Spaces Tring-Azzurra Records
- 2002 – Sit Back
- 2006 – Grateful
- 2008 – Unknown Legends
- 2011 – Hand in Hand
- 2012 – Morning Lights (with Luca Francioso)

=== Compilations ===
- EWOB 1999 – Strictly Country Records
- Vicenza in Musica 2000
- EWOB 2001 – Strictly Country Records
- Country in This Country Vol.2 2002- Ethnoworld Srl
- EWOB 2002 – Strictly Country Records
- Flatpicking 2003 – FGM Records
- EWOB 2007 – Strictly Country Records

== Awards ==
- Homegrown CD Award 2003 for the album Sit Back
- Second place at Best Instrumental Album of Just Plain Folks Music Awards 2009 for the album Grateful
- OurStage Channel Prize 2009 for the track Sunflowers of the album Unknown Legends
