= Stefano Guidotti =

Swiss footballer (born 1999)

Personal information
- Date of birth: 16 June 1999 (age 27)
- Place of birth: Locarno, Switzerland
- Height: 1.85 m (6 ft 1 in)
- Position: Midfielder

Team information
- Current team: Paradiso
- Number: 6

Senior career*
| Years | Team | Apps | (Gls) |
| 2016–2022 | Lugano | 42 | (3) |
| 2019 | Lugano II | 3 | (0) |
| 2018–2019 | → Chiasso (loan) | 25 | (3) |
| 2022–2024 | St. Gallen II | 5 | (0) |
| 2022–2024 | St. Gallen | 9 | (0) |
| 2024 | Olbia | 2 | (0) |
| 2025– | Paradiso | 17 | (0) |

International career^{‡}
| 2013 | Switzerland U15 | 1 | (0) |
| 2016–2017 | Switzerland U18 | 3 | (1) |
| 2019 | Switzerland U20 | 1 | (0) |
- * Club domestic league appearances and goals as of 1 October 2026 ‡ National team caps and goals as of 25 March 2019

Stefano Guidotti (born 16 June 1999) is a Swiss footballer who plays for Swiss Promotion League club Paradiso.

== Club career ==
On 8 July 2022, Guidotti signed a two-year contract with St. Gallen.

On 31 January 2024, Guidotti joined Olbia in the Italian Serie C until 30 June 2024.

== Honours ==
Lugano

- Swiss Cup: 2021–22
