= 2023–24 Promotion League =

Swiss Promotion League
- Season: 2023–24
- Dates: 5 August 2023 – 25 May 2024
- Champions: Étoile Carouge
- Promoted: Étoile Carouge
- Relegated: St. Gallen II; Servette II
- Swiss Cup: Étoile Carouge; Rapperswil-Jona; Biel-Bienne; Paradiso; Delémont; Kriens; Brühl
- Matches: 306
- Goals: 1,012 (3.31 per match)
- Top goalscorer: 18 goals: Labinot Bajrami (FC Zürich II)
- Biggest home win: Zürich II 6–0 Breitenrain
- Biggest away win: Brühl 0–5 Étoile Carouge
- Highest scoring: 9 goals: Bulle 5–4 Basel II; Bavois 7–2 Young Boys II
- Longest winning run: SC Brühl (7 wins)
- Longest unbeaten run: Étoile Carouge; Rapperswil-Jona (10 games)
- Longest winless run: FC Bavois; St. Gallen II (9 games)
- Longest losing run: FC Zürich II (6 losses)

The 2023–24 Swiss Promotion League season (known as the Hoval Promotion League for sponsorship reasons) was the 12th edition (10th under its current name) of the 3rd tier of the Swiss football league system under its current format.

== Overview ==
Location of the 2023–24 Promotion League teams

The eighteen teams of the previous season are joined by Servette FC II, SR Delémont, FC Paradiso and FC Lugano II, who were promoted from the 1. Liga Classic and no team relegated from the Challenge League, replaced last season's runner-up and third place Stade Nyonnais and FC Baden. Furthermore, the number of under-21 teams allowed in the Promotion League is no longer restricted to four, starting with this season. This season features seven U21 teams.

The season started on 5 August 2023 and the final matchday was on 25 May 2024.

=== Teams ===
Club	Canton	Stadium	Capacity
Basel U-21	Basel-City	Stadion Rankhof or Youth Campus Basel	7,000; 1,000
FC Bavois	Vaud	Terrain des Peupliers	659
FC Biel-Bienne	Bern	Gurzelen Stadion	5,500
FC Breitenrain Bern	Bern	Spitalacker	1,450
SC Brühl	St. Gallen	Paul-Grüninger-Stadion	4,200
FC Bulle	Fribourg	Stade de Bouleyres	7,000
SC Cham	Zug	Stadion Eizmoos	1,800
SR Delémont	Jura	La Blancherie	5,263
Étoile Carouge FC	Geneva	Stade de la Fontenette	3,690
SC Kriens	Lucerne	Stadion Kleinfeld	5,360
Lugano U-21	Ticino	Cornaredo Stadium	6,330
Luzern U-21	Lucerne	Swissporarena or Allmend Süd	16,800; 2,000
FC Paradiso	Ticino	Campo Pian Scairolo	1,000
FC Rapperswil-Jona	St. Gallen	Stadion Grünfeld	2,500
Servette U-21	Geneva	Stade de Genève or Stade de la Fontenette	30,000; 3,690
St. Gallen U-21	St. Gallen	Espenmoos or Kybunpark	3,000; 19,264
Young Boys U-21	Bern	Stadion Wankdorf	32,000
Zürich U-21	Zürich	Sportplatz Heerenschürli	1,120

== League table ==
Pos	Team	Pld	W	D	L	GF	GA	GD	Pts	Promotion, qualification or relegation
1	Étoile Carouge FC (C, P)	34	24	4	6	72	38	+34	76	Promotion to Swiss Challenge League and qualification for Swiss Cup
2	FC Rapperswil-Jona	34	22	5	7	74	44	+30	71	Qualification for Swiss Cup
3	FC Biel-Bienne	34	18	5	11	61	35	+26	59	Qualification for Swiss Cup
4	FC Paradiso	34	16	8	10	38	32	+6	56	Qualification for Swiss Cup
5	SR Delémont	34	16	5	13	56	62	−6	53	Qualification for Swiss Cup
6	SC Kriens	34	13	10	11	50	58	−8	49	Qualification for Swiss Cup
7	SC Brühl	34	15	5	14	53	60	−7	50	Qualification for Swiss Cup
8	SC Cham	34	12	8	14	69	62	+7	44	
9	FC Zürich II	34	13	6	15	58	56	+2	45	
10	FC Bavois	34	12	7	15	66	58	+8	43	
11	FC Breitenrain	34	10	9	15	48	61	−13	39	
12	BSC Young Boys II	34	12	8	14	51	63	−12	44	
13	FC Luzern II	34	11	10	13	61	68	−7	43	
14	FC Bulle	34	10	9	15	47	58	−11	39	
15	FC Basel II	34	10	8	16	54	63	−9	38	
16	FC Lugano II	34	12	4	18	51	65	−14	40	
17	FC St. Gallen II (R)	34	10	7	17	56	61	−5	37	Relegation to the 1. Liga Classic
18	Servette FC II (R)	34	6	10	18	47	68	−21	28	Relegation to the 1. Liga Classic

Source: Erste Liga - Match center
Rules for classification: 1) Points; 2) Goal difference; 3) Goals scored; 4) Head-to-head goal difference; 5) Away goals scored; 6) Draw.
(C) Champions; (P) Promoted; (R) Relegated

== Results ==
Home \ Away	BAS	BAV	BIE	BRE	BRÜ	BUL	CHA	DEL	ETC	KRI	LUG	LUZ	PAR	RAP	SER	STG	BYB	ZÜR
FC Basel II	—	0–2	0–0	1–2	3–2	1–1	3–2	4–1	2–0	0–1	3–0	5–1	1–3	3–2	1–1	2–2	2–0	1–3
FC Bavois	1–0	—	2–3	4–2	5–1	1–1	2–1	2–3	0–3	1–1	3–1	5–2	1–2	0–2	3–0	1–2	7–2	4–1
FC Biel-Bienne	5–1	4–0	—	2–0	0–1	2–0	2–2	2–0	0–1	1–2	1–3	2–1	1–1	0–1	2–0	1–1	1–2	3–1
FC Breitenrain	2–2	4–2	3–2	—	1–1	3–1	2–1	1–1	0–1	2–2	1–2	0–2	1–1	2–0	2–2	1–2	1–1	2–2
SC Brühl	1–0	0–2	1–6	3–2	—	0–1	4–1	4–1	0–5	4–1	1–0	0–0	2–1	2–4	3–0	2–2	3–1	3–0
FC Bulle	5–4	2–2	1–0	3–1	1–3	—	3–2	2–2	1–2	3–1	3–2	4–4	1–2	0–1	0–0	2–2	3–3	1–0
SC Cham	2–0	2–2	0–1	3–2	4–0	3–1	—	1–2	2–4	1–1	5–1	3–2	1–1	1–2	4–3	2–1	6–2	2–2
SR Delémont	3–0 (Note: Original result 0–4. Delémont were awarded a 3–0 forfeit win, because Basel II fielded an ineligible player.)	2–0	1–0	2–1	1–0	1–0	2–3	—	3–2	2–2	5–2	3–2	1–1	2–4	1–3	2–1	2–2	1–2
Étoile Carouge FC	2–2	2–1	1–0	3–1	3–1	2–0	3–3	0–1	—	4–0	3–2	2–2	0–1	1–0	3–2	5–1	2–1	3–2
SC Kriens	3–2	2–1	0–2	1–0	1–1	1–1	0–4	6–2	1–3	—	0–1	1–1	3–1	2–5	0–1	3–2	0–0	0–0
FC Lugano II	2–4	2–1	0–3	2–1	4–0	2–1	3–2	3–0	1–2	1–2	—	1–2	2–1	0–1	2–1	1–3	2–3	1–0
FC Luzern II	4–1	4–3	0–2	0–2	1–1	0–1	3–2	0–3	2–2	1–1	4–4	—	0–1	1–2	4–2	3–1	4–1	2–2
FC Paradiso	1–1	2–0	1–2	0–1	1–0	2–0	1–0	1–0	1–0	1–2	1–0	1–0	—	1–2	1–1	0–2	0–0	2–1
FC Rapperswil-Jona	3–0	1–1	3–3	1–1	0–3 (Note: Original result 2–0. Brühl were awarded a 3–0 forfeit win, as Rapperswil-Jona had fielded an unregistered player.)	1–0	3–0	3–0	3–1	4–1	3–0	2–3	2–0	—	2–1	4–1	1–1	2–4
Servette FC II	2–1	1–1	1–2	0–2	1–2	4–1	1–1	1–3	1–3	2–3	2–2	1–1	2–3	1–1	—	1–5	3–2	2–3
FC St. Gallen II	1–2	1–1	1–2	4–0	1–2	3–2	1–1	0–2	0–2	3–0	1–1	0–1	1–2	3–4	4–2	—	0–1	0–1
BSC Young Boys II	2–2	2–1	1–3	1–2	3–0	2–0	1–0	3–1	0–1	0–4	1–0	3–4	0–0	2–1	0–2	3–1	—	2–0
FC Zürich II	1–0	0–4	2–1	6–0	3–2	0–1	1–2	4–0	1–2	1–2	1–1	4–0	1–0	3–4	0–0	2–3	4–3	—

Source: Erste Liga - Match center
Legend: Blue = home team win; Yellow = draw; Red = away team win.
