= Raúl Medeiros =

Bolivian footballer (born 1975)

Personal information
- Date of birth: 2 February 1975 (age 51)
- Place of birth: Santa Cruz de la Sierra, Bolivia
- Position: Forward

International career
| Years | Team | Apps | (Gls) |
| 1995 | Bolivia | 1 | (0) |

Raúl Medeiros (born 2 February 1975) is a Bolivian footballer. He played in one match for the Bolivia national football team in 1995. He was also part of Bolivia's squad for the 1995 Copa América tournament.
