= FC Paradiso =

Association football club in Switzerland

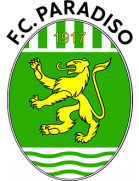
- Full name: Football Club Paradiso
- Short name: FCP, Paradiso
- Founded: 1 September 1917; 109 years ago
- Ground: Campo Pian Scairolo
- Capacity: 1,000
- Owner: Antonio Caggiano
- Manager: Andrea Agostinelli
- League: Promotion League
- 2024–25: Promotion League, 9th of 18
- Website: https://fcparadiso.ch/
Home colours	Away colours

1917 Football Club Paradiso, commonly referred to as FC Paradiso, or colloquially as Paradiso, is a football based in Paradiso Municipality, Ticino, Switzerland. The club competes in the Promotion League, the third tier of Swiss football.

== History ==
FC Paradiso was founded on 1 September 1917, by people in the area, with "the aim of practicing and promoting the game of football". In the 2023–24, the ongoing edition of the Promotion League, Paradiso are set to make their highest ever finish, at third place in the third tier.

== Current Squad ==
As of 20 September 2026

Note: Flags indicate national team as defined under FIFA eligibility rules; some limited exceptions apply. Players may hold more than one non-FIFA nationality.

No.	Pos.	Nation	Player
1	GK	SUI	Yannis Pala
2	MF	ITA	Ezequiel Schelotto (c)
3	DF	ITA	Claudio Cellamare
5	DF	SUI	Santiago Miranda
6	MF	SUI	Stefano Guidotti
7	MF	SUI	Rion Xhemaili
8	FW	ARG	Santiago Mateucci
9	FW	SUI	Aleksander Babic
10	FW	ARG	Federico Rasic
11	FW	SUI	Michel de Jesus
13	GK	ALB	Nicolo Abazi
14	FW	SUI	Théophil Bachmann
16	MF	ITA	Filippo Ballerini
17	MF	ITA	Giancarlo Mercuri

No.	Pos.	Nation	Player
20	FW	ESP	Miguel Montes
21	DF	SUI	Dennis Iapichino
22	DF	SUI	Damiano Plisko
23	MF	ITA	Gianluca Pizzagalli
25	DF	ITA	Luca Benacquista
27	MF	FRA	Ali Ouattara
29	FW	VEN	Alejandro Cichero (on loan from Frosinone)
30	DF	ITA	Jean Assui
67	MF	SUI	Mikail Akdemir
72	GK	ITA	Manuel Aiello
77	FW	SUI	Erduan Smajli
96	DF	ITA	Alberto Tentardini
99	MF	ITA	Ibrahim De Souza Xavier

=== Out on loan ===
Note: Flags indicate national team as defined under FIFA eligibility rules; some limited exceptions apply. Players may hold more than one non-FIFA nationality.

No.	Pos.	Nation	Player
19	DF	ITA	Angelo Carpani (at AC Bellinzona until 30 June 2027)

== Kits and Sponsors ==
Paradiso wear a dark green home kit with a black away kit. Their kits have been manufactured by Adidas since 2022, and their sponsor is New Job Construzioni SA.
