= Carlos Contreras (footballer, born 1972) =

Venezuelan footballer

Personal information
- Full name: Carlos Alberto Contreras Araújo
- Date of birth: 17 August 1972 (age 54)
- Position: Midfielder

International career
Years	Team	Apps	(Gls)
1993–1997	Venezuela	10	(0)

Carlos Alberto Contreras Araújo (born 17 August 1972) is a Venezuelan former footballer. He played in ten matches for the Venezuela national football team from 1993 to 1997. He was also part of Venezuela's squad for the 1993 Copa América tournament.
