= Alexander Hezzel =

Venezuelan footballer (born 1964)

Personal information
- Date of birth: 12 August 1964 (age 62)
- Position: Defender

International career
Years	Team	Apps	(Gls)
1994–1996	Venezuela	6	(0)

Alexander Hezzel (born 12 August 1964) is a Venezuelan footballer. He played in six matches for the Venezuela national football team from 1994 to 1996. He was also part of Venezuela's squad for the 1995 Copa América tournament.
