= Alexander Echenique =

Venezuelan footballer (born 1971)

Personal information
- Date of birth: 11 November 1971 (age 54)
- Position: Defender

International career
Years	Team	Apps	(Gls)
1993–1997	Venezuela	17	(0)

Alexander Echenique (born 11 November 1971) is a Venezuelan former footballer. He played in 17 matches for the Venezuela national football team from 1993 to 1997. He was also part of Venezuela's squad for the 1993 Copa América tournament.
