= Nery Ortíz =

Paraguayan footballer (born 1973)

Personal information
- Full name: Nery Ramón Ortíz
- Date of birth: 16 March 1973 (age 53)
- Place of birth: Juan Emilio O'Leary, Paraguay
- Height: 1.75 m (5 ft 9 in)
- Position: Defender

Senior career*
Years	Team	Apps	(Gls)
1995–2001	Guaraní		
2003–2005	Cerro Porteño		
2006	12 de Octubre		

International career
1995–2001	Paraguay	11	(0)
- * Club domestic league appearances and goals

Nery Ramón Ortíz (born 16 March 1973) is a Paraguayan former footballer who played as a defender. He made eleven appearances for the Paraguay national team from 1995 to 2001. He was also part of Paraguay's squad for the 1995 Copa América tournament.
