= Ricardo Milillo =

Venezuelan footballer (born 1969)

Personal information
- Date of birth: 19 September 1969 (age 57)
- Position: Midfielder

International career
Years	Team	Apps	(Gls)
1993	Venezuela	8	(0)

Ricardo Milillo (born 19 September 1969) is a Venezuelan footballer. He played in eight matches for the Venezuela national football team in 1993. He was also part of Venezuela's squad for the 1993 Copa América tournament.
