= Robert Arteaga =

Bolivian footballer (born 1973)

Personal information
- Date of birth: 10 February 1973 (age 53)
- Place of birth: Santa Cruz de la Sierra, Bolivia

International career
Years	Team	Apps	(Gls)
1994–1995	Bolivia	3	(0)

Robert Arteaga (born 10 February 1973) is a Bolivian footballer. He played in three matches for the Bolivia national football team from 1994 to 1995. He was also part of Bolivia's squad for the 1995 Copa América tournament.
