= Marcial Garay =

Paraguayan footballer (born 1968)

Personal information
- Full name: Marcial Alberto Garay
- Date of birth: 29 April 1968 (age 58)
- Place of birth: Encarnación, Paraguay
- Height: 1.81 m (5 ft 11 in)
- Position: Forward

Senior career*
Years	Team	Apps	(Gls)
1993	Sportivo Luqueño		
1993–1994	Atlético Morelia		
1994–1997	Unión Magdalena		
1998–1999	Sportivo Luqueño		
2000	Olimpia		
2000	Sportivo Luqueño		
2001	12 de Octubre		
2002	Deportivo Recoleta		
2003–2004	Sol de América		
2004	12 de Octubre		
2005–2006	Guaraní		

International career
1993–1995	Paraguay	3	(0)
- * Club domestic league appearances and goals

Marcial Alberto Garay (born 29 April 1968) is a Paraguayan former footballer who played as a forward. He made three appearances for the Paraguay national team from 1993 to 1995. He was also part of Paraguay's squad for the 1993 Copa América tournament.
