= Nelson Cabrera (Uruguayan footballer) =

Uruguayan footballer (born 1967)

Personal information
- Full name: Nelson Alcides Cabrera Caraballo
- Date of birth: 18 July 1967 (age 59)
- Place of birth: Canelones, Uruguay
- Height: 1.70 m (5 ft 7 in)
- Position: Defender

Senior career*
Years	Team	Apps	(Gls)
1986–1992	Danubio		
1993–1994	Estudiantes de La Plata	20	(0)
1995	Rampla Juniors		

International career
1988–1993	Uruguay	23	(1)
- * Club domestic league appearances and goals

Nelson Alcides Cabrera (born 18 July 1967 in Canelones) is a Uruguayan former footballer.

== Club career ==
Cabrera played for Estudiantes de La Plata in the Primera División de Argentina.

== International career ==
Cabrera made 23 appearances for the senior Uruguay national football team from 1988 to 1993, including three 1994 FIFA World Cup qualifying matches. He played for Uruguay at the Copa América 1993.
