= Alex Fernández (footballer, born 1970) =

Colombian footballer (born 1970)

Personal information
- Full name: Manuel Alexander Fernández
- Date of birth: January 22, 1970 (age 56)
- Place of birth: Medellín
- Position: Defender

Senior career*
Years	Team	Apps	(Gls)
1990-93	Independiente Medellín		
1993	Deportes Tolima		
1993-96	Independiente Medellín		
1996-97	Deportivo Cali		
1997-1999	Independiente Medellín		
1999-2001	Millonarios		
2001-2003	Deportes Quindío		

International career
- Colombia
- * Club domestic league appearances and goals

Manuel Alexander "Alex" Fernández (born 22 January 1970) is a retired Colombian football defender.

He was born in Medellín. He spent the main part of his career in Independiente Medellín from 1990 through 1999, except spells in Deportes Tolima in 1993 and Deportivo Cali in 1996–97. He then played for Millonarios F.C. from 1999 to 2001 and Deportes Quindío from 2001 to 2003.

He was capped for Colombia national football team, including at the 1995 Copa América. Your son is a footballer Bryan Fernández.
