= Martín Yupanqui =

Peruvian footballer (born 1962)

Personal information
- Date of birth: 20 October 1962 (age 64)

International career
Years	Team	Apps	(Gls)
1988–1996	Peru	2	(0)

Martín Yupanqui (born 20 October 1962) is a Peruvian footballer. He played in two matches for the Peru national football team from 1988 to 1996. He was also part of Peru's squad for the 1995 Copa América tournament.
