= Jesús Valbuena =

Venezuelan footballer (born 1969)

Personal information
- Date of birth: 28 July 1969 (age 57)
- Place of birth: Cabimas, Venezuela
- Position: Midfielder

International career
Years	Team	Apps	(Gls)
1995–1996	Venezuela	7	(0)

Jesús Valbuena (born 28 July 1969) is a Venezuelan footballer. He played in seven matches for the Venezuela national football team from 1995 to 1996. He was also part of Venezuela's squad for the 1995 Copa América tournament.
