= Mauro Arbiza =

Uruguayan visual artist (born 1968

- Born: Mauro Arbiza Fernández; 21 September 1968; Montevideo, Uruguay
- Citizenship: Uruguayan
- Occupations: Visual artist; Painter; Sculptor

Mauro Arbiza Fernández (born 21 September 1968) is a Uruguayan visual artist, painter, and sculptor.

== Career ==
=== Early career ===
Born in Montevideo on 21 September 1968, Arbiza developed an interest in plastic arts from an early age, so he began to study painting with Carlos Caffera in 1983, aged 15. After dedicating his teenage years and his 20s to earning a living to "support the bills" through jobs, Arbiza decided to abandon the typical work structures to "support himself" through his passion, becoming a self-taught and experimental artist. In 2000, he released a book titled Interrealismo, which offers an introspective look at both the creative process and the artist's inner world, from an energy-based spiritual viewpoint.

In 2004, Arbiza traveled to Miami, where he met Cuban-American sculptor Manuel Carbonell, who, having been impressed by his work, invited him to become his apprentice. Two years later, in 2006, he returned to Miami to formally study under Carbonell's guidance. He is thus a member of the fourth generation of Auguste Rodin's disciples. In October 2006, one of his paintings was acquired for the permanent collection of the Museum of Latin American Art (MOOLA), Los Angeles.

=== Later career ===
Arbiza eventually settled in Paso de los Toros, where he later established the Interrealist movement in 2007. In early 2012, several of his sculptural works were showcased in the Horizontal/Vertical exhibition at Pablo Atchugarry Foundation Sculpture Park. Around this time, he used fiberglass to make a work measuring 5 meters tall called Arbol del Triunfo ("Tree of Triumph"), which was displayed at the Pablo Atchugarry Foundation-Museum in Punta del Este during the summer of 2012, and which was later showcased in the center of Paso de los Toros. Up to that point, his works were primarily crafted from fiberglass, a material that allowed his sculptures to appear light and airborne.

Visually, Arbiza aimed to achieve a perfect balance between volume and line through simplified, clean forms. He is also known for hosting live sculpture-carving sessions, allowing audiences to witness the creation of a piece from a raw block to its final form.

From 2014 onward, Arbiza began using carbon fiber, a highly durable material, for all his sculptures. This marked the beginning of his groundbreaking project called Floating Sculptures, a collection of fiberglass pieces coated in marine-grade paint, designed to rest on water surfaces. In recent years, Arbiza's works have been featured in exhibitions all over the world, including in Portugal, Spain, Canada, South Korea, China, the Dominican Republic, Puerto Rico, and his homeland of Uruguay.
