= Gustavo Sotelo =

Paraguayan footballer (born 1968)

Personal information
- Full name: Gustavo Ángel Sotelo Mendoza
- Date of birth: 16 March 1968 (age 58)
- Place of birth: Asunción, Paraguay
- Height: 1.81 m (5 ft 11 in)
- Position: Midfielder

Senior career*
Years	Team	Apps	(Gls)
1985–1991	Cerro Porteño		
1991–1992	Deportivo Cali		
1993	Cerro Porteño	11	(0)
1993–1995	Olimpia	10	(2)
1995	Cruzeiro		
1996	Olimpia		
1997	Guaraní	6	(0)
1998	Barcelona SC		
1998	Rangers	15	(4)
1999	Olimpia	5	(0)
1999	Guaraní		
2000	Santa Cruz		
2000	Rentistas		
2001	Atlético Colegiales		
2002	Sportivo Luqueño		
2002	Deportivo Recoleta		

International career
1993–1997	Paraguay	5	(0)

Managerial career
- 2005: General Caballero ZC
- 2006: Deportivo Pinozá
- 2007: Paraguay U17
- 2008: Fernando de la Mora
- 2009: Martín Ledesma
- 2011: General Díaz
- 2012: Martín Ledesma
- 2014: Cerro Corá
- 2015: Deportivo Caaguazú
- 2016: Deportivo Liberación
- 2021–2023: Guaraní (women)
- 2024: Cerro Porteño (women)
- * Club domestic league appearances and goals

Gustavo Ángel Sotelo Mendoza (born 16 March 1968) is a former Paraguayan footballer who played as a midfielder for various clubs in Paraguay, Uruguay, Brazil and Chile. He also played for the Paraguay national team in the Copa América Ecuador 1993 and Uruguay 1995.

== Clubs ==
- (Paraguay) Cerro Porteño 1985-1991
- (Colombia) Deportivo Cali 1991–1992
- (Paraguay) Cerro Porteño 1993
- (Paraguay) Olimpia 1993-1995
- (Brazil) Cruzeiro 1995
- (Paraguay) Olimpia 1996
- (Paraguay) Guaraní 1997
- (Ecuador) Barcelona 1998
- (Chile) Rangers 1998
- (Paraguay) Olimpia 1999
- (Paraguay) Guaraní 1999
- (Brazil) Santa Cruz 2000
- (Uruguay) Rentistas 2000
- (Paraguay) Atlético Colegiales 2001
- (Paraguay) Sportivo Luqueño 2002
- (Paraguay) Deportivo Recoleta 2002

== Honours ==
- (Paraguay) Cerro Porteño 1992 and 1994 (Paraguayan Primera División Championship)
