= Félix Golindano =

Venezuelan footballer (born 1969)

Personal information
- Full name: Félix Armando Golindano Pereira
- Date of birth: 16 November 1969 (age 56)
- Place of birth: Caracas, Venezuela
- Height: 1.94 m (6 ft 4 in)
- Position: Goalkeeper

Senior career*
Years	Team	Apps	(Gls)
1991-1995	Trujillanos	16	(0)
1995-1997	Happy Valley AA	6	(0)
1997-1999	Estudiantes	5	(0)
1999	12 de Octubre	6	(0)
1999-2001	Olimpia	7	(0)
2001-2005	Caracas	10	(0)
2005-2006	Mineros	5	(0)

International career
1996	Venezuela	4	(0)
- * Club domestic league appearances and goals

Félix Armando Golindano Pereira (born 16 November 1969 in Caracas, Venezuela) is a former Venezuelan professional football goalkeeper. Born in Venezuela, he has played for the Venezuela national football team.
