= Alexis Ubillús =

Peruvian footballer (born 1972)

Personal information
- Full name: Juan Alexis Ubillús Calmet
- Date of birth: 30 December 1972 (age 53)
- Place of birth: Lima, Peru
- Height: 1.78 m (5 ft 10 in)
- Position: Left back

Senior career*
| Years | Team | Apps | (Gls) |
| 1992 | Sporting Cristal | 1 | (0) |
| 1993–1994 | Defensor Lima | 15 | (0) |
| 1994–1995 | Universitario | 67 | (3) |
| 1996 | Sporting Cristal | 10 | (0) |
| 1997–1998 | Deportivo Municipal | 63 | (3) |
| 1999–2000 | Melgar | 71 | (0) |
| 2001 | Alianza Lima | 35 | (0) |
| 2002 | Coronel Bolognesi | 38 | (0) |
| 2003 | Melgar | 23 | (0) |
| 2004 | Estudiantes de Medicina | 22 | (1) |
| 2004 | Universidad San Martín | 23 | (0) |
| 2005 | Alianza Lima | 6 | (0) |
| 2005–2006 | Universidad César Vallejo | 9 | (0) |
| 2008 | Atlanta FC | | |

International career
| 1994–2001 | Peru | 11 | (0) |
- * Club domestic league appearances and goals

Juan Alexis Ubillús Calmet (born 30 December 1972 in Lima) is a retired Peruvian footballer who played as a left back.

== Club career ==
Ubillús played for a number of clubs in Peru, including Universitario, FBC Melgar and Alianza Lima.

== International career ==
Ubillús made 11 appearances for the senior Peru national football team from 1994 to 2001.
