= Alejandro Cichero =

Venezuelan footballer (born 1977)

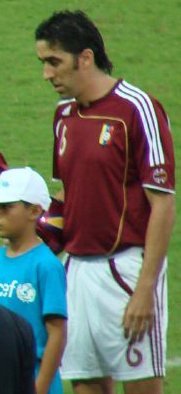

Personal information
- Full name: Alejandro Enrique Cíchero Konarek
- Date of birth: April 20, 1977 (age 49)
- Place of birth: Caracas, Venezuela
- Height: 1.96 m (6 ft 5 in)
- Position: Defender

Youth career
- 1988–1995: Trujillanos

Senior career*
Years	Team	Apps	(Gls)
1996–1998	Trujillanos	48	(0)
1998–2001	Benfica	0	(0)
1998–1999	→ Cagliari (loan)	13	(0)
1999–2000	→ Oliveira do Bairro (loan)	26	(0)
2000–2001	Benfica B	10	(1)
2001–2002	Deportivo Italchacao	26	(5)
2002	Central Español	5	(0)
2003	Atlético Cerro	20	(2)
2004	Nacional Montevideo	12	(1)
2004–2008	Litex Lovech	62	(5)
2008–2009	Shandong Luneng	58	(5)
2009–2010	Caracas	7	(0)
2010–2011	Millonarios	46	(5)
2013–2014	Deportivo Anzoátegui	24	(1)
Total		357	(25)

International career
2002–2007	Venezuela	47	(2)
- * Club domestic league appearances and goals

Alejandro Enrique Cíchero Konarek (Latin American Spanish: [aleˈxandɾo ˈsitʃeɾo]; born April 20, 1977) is a Venezuelan former footballer who played as a defender.

== Career ==
Born in Caracas, Cichero joined the youth system of Trujillanos Fútbol Club in 1988, being promoted to the first team in 1996 and helping them reach the Copa CONMEBOL Playoff in his second season.

In 1998, he moved to Europe, joining Benfica, who immediately loaned him to Cagliari Calcio in the Serie A, playing thirteen matches over the course of the 1998–99 season. He then spent two seasons in the Portuguese Second Division — the third tier of Portuguese football. First in 1999–2000 at Oliveira do Bairro S.C. and then at Benfica's reserve team, where he made one bench appearance on the first team in a 2–1 win against Porto.

In 2002, he returned home, playing the 2001–02 season at Deportivo Italchacao, before spending an 18-month span in the Uruguayan Primera División, in three clubs. In 2004, he returned to Europe, joining PFC Litex Lovech in the Bulgarian league, where he would stay until 2008, helping the team finish third in 2005–06, as well progressing to the Round of 32 in the UEFA Cup.

The 31-year-old then joined the Chinese team, Shandong Luneng Taishan F.C., immediately conquering his first title, the 2008 Chinese Super League. After two seasons, he returned to his native hometown, to play for Caracas FC. In July 2010, the Venezuelan international, moved to Colombia, reuniting with former national team manager, Richard Páez at Millonarios.

In 2013, the 36-year-old, came out of retirement to play one more season, joining Deportivo Anzoátegui.

== International career ==
He played in the 2004 and 2007 editions of Copa America. He has made over 40 appearances for the Venezuela national team since 2002.

=== International goals ===
No.	Date	Venue	Opponent	Score	Result	Competition	Ref.
1.	June 1, 2007	José Pachencho Romero, Maracaibo, Venezuela	Canada	1–1	2–2	Friendly	
2.	June 30, 2007	Pueblo Nuevo, San Cristóbal, Venezuela	Peru	1–0	2–0	2007 Copa América	

== Personal life ==
He is the son of Mauro Cichero who was a professional football player and represented Venezuela in the 1980 Olympics. His brothers, Gabriel and Mauro, and his son Alejandro Cichero Jr, are also professional football players. Born in Venezuela, Cichero is of Italian and Polish descent.

== Honors ==
Shandong Luneng Taishan

- Chinese Super League: 2008

Caracas

- Venezuelan 1st Division: 2009–10
