= Rafael Quesada =

Peruvian footballer (born 1971)

Personal information
- Date of birth: 16 August 1971 (age 55)
- Place of birth: Miami, Florida, U.S.

International career
Years	Team	Apps	(Gls)
1993–1996	Peru	3	(0)

Rafael Quesada (born 16 August 1971) is an American-born Peruvian footballer. He played in three matches for the Peru national football team from 1993 to 1996. He was also part of Peru's squad for the 1995 Copa América tournament.
