= Alberto Ramírez (footballer, born 1968) =

Peruvian footballer and manager

Personal information
- Full name: Alberto Ramírez Dioses
- Date of birth: November 5, 1968 (age 57)
- Place of birth: Talara, Peru
- Height: 1.83 m (6 ft 0 in)
- Position: Striker

Senior career*
Years	Team	Apps	(Gls)
1988–1989	Juve. La Palma		
1990	Sport Boys		
1990	The Strongest		
1991–1992	Alianza Atlético		
1993	Sporting Cristal		
1994–1995	Deportivo Sipesa		
1996	Universitario	8	(0)
1997	Tampico Madero		
1997	Puebla	11	(2)
1998	Xerez	11	(1)
1998–1999	Melgar	27	(7)
1999	Alianza Atlético	22	(4)
2000	Deportivo UPAO	16	(6)
2000	Juan Aurich	19	(0)

International career
1992–1996	Peru	11	(3)

Managerial career
- 2009: Atlético Torino (caretaker)
- 2010: Atlético Torino
- * Club domestic league appearances and goals as of 8 December 2011

Alberto Ramírez Dioses (born November 5, 1968) is a Peruvian manager and retired footballer who played as a striker.

== Playing career ==
=== Club ===
Ramírez started his senior career with Huacho based club Juventud La Palma. He played most of his career in Peru, with notable teams such as Sport Boys, Sporting Cristal, Universitario de Deportes, FBC Melgar, and Juan Aurich. Outside of his home country, Alberto played in Bolivia with The Strongest and in Mexico with Tampico Madero and Puebla. He has also played in the Second Division in Spain with Xerez CD, where he played 11 matches and scored one goal.

=== International ===
He played for the Peru national team for a brief period, scoring 3 goals in 11 matches.

== Managerial career ==
Ramírez started his managerial career with Second Division side Club Atlético Torino in the 2009 Peruvian Segunda División season.
