= Wilson Chacón =

Venezuelan footballer (born 1971)

Personal information
- Full name: Wilson Arcángel Chacón Alviárez
- Date of birth: 11 May 1971 (age 55)
- Position: Midfielder

International career
Years	Team	Apps	(Gls)
1993–1996	Venezuela	11	(0)

Wilson Arcángel Chacón Alviárez (born 11 May 1971) is a Venezuelan former footballer. He played in eleven matches for the Venezuela national football team from 1993 to 1996. He was also part of Venezuela's squad for the 1993 Copa América tournament.
