= Marcos Mathías =

Venezuelan footballer (born 1970)

Personal information
- Full name: Marcos Elías Mathías Silva
- Date of birth: 12 May 1970 (age 56)

International career
Years	Team	Apps	(Gls)
1993–1997	Venezuela	18	(0)

Marcos Elías Mathías Silva (born 12 May 1970) is a Venezuelan footballer. He played in 18 matches for the Venezuela national football team from 1993 to 1997. He was also part of Venezuela's squad for the 1993 Copa América tournament.
