= Leonardo Lupi =

Venezuelan footballer (born 1972)

Personal information
- Full name: Leonardo Enrique Lupi
- Date of birth: 2 October 1972 (age 54)
- Position: Defender

International career
Years	Team	Apps	(Gls)
1993–2000	Venezuela	2	(0)

Leonardo Enrique Lupi (born 2 October 1972) is a Venezuelan footballer. He played in two matches for the Venezuela national football team from 1993 to 2000. He was also part of Venezuela's squad for the 1993 Copa América tournament.
