= Miguel Echenausi =

Venezuelan footballer (born 1968)

Personal information
- Full name: Miguel Ángel Echenausi de Ciancio
- Date of birth: 21 February 1968 (age 58)
- Place of birth: Tachira, Venezuela
- Position: Defender

Senior career*
Years	Team	Apps	(Gls)
1990–1993	Unión Atlético Táchira		
1992	→ ULA FC (loan)		
1993–1994	Caracas		
1994–1995	Estudiantes de Mérida		
1996	Minervén		
1996–1997	Cúcuta Deportivo	2	(0)
1997	Everton		
1998	Universidad de Concepción		
1999–2001	Estudiantes Merida		
2001–2002	Deportivo Galicia		
2002–2003	Deportivo Táchira		

International career
1991–2000	Venezuela	28	(2)
- * Club domestic league appearances and goals

Miguel Ángel Echenausi de Ciancio (born 21 February 1968) is a Venezuelan former football defender who made a total number of 28 appearances for the Venezuela national team between 1991 and 2000.

== Club career ==
Echenausi started his professional career at Unión Atlético Táchira. Abroad, he had stints in Colombia with Cúcuta Deportivo and Chile with both Everton de Viña del Mar and Universidad de Concepción.
