= Walter Lupi =

Italian guitarist (born 1960)

Walter Lupi is an Italian guitarist, born in Milan, in 1960. He began playing the guitar at age 10, largely self-taught. Later, he studied music theory, harmony and classical guitar receiving a diploma from the Conservatorio di Alessandria.

He now usually plays fingerstyle.

In search of new sounds, he experimented with using sequencer and synthesizer applied to the acoustic guitar, eventually leading to the album Spirals (1998/9) produced by Mauro Pagani.

After this experimental period, he returned to his acoustic guitar sound, marked by the recording of the solo album Shorts (recorded in August 2000 at Acoustic Music Records)
