= Claudio Arbiza =

Uruguayan footballer (born 1967)

Personal information
- Full name: Jorge Claudio Arbiza Zanuttini
- Date of birth: March 3, 1967 (age 59)
- Place of birth: Montevideo, Uruguay
- Height: 1.89 m (6 ft 2 in)
- Position: Goalkeeper

Senior career*
Years	Team	Apps	(Gls)
1984–1994	Defensor Sporting Club		
1995	Olimpia		
1996–2000	Colo-Colo		
2001–2004	Nacional		

International career
1994–1996	Uruguay	6	(0)

Managerial career
- 2018: Colo-Colo (gk coach)
- 2019: Real Garcilazo (gk coach)
- 2019–2020: Palestino (gk coach)
- 2021–2022: Deportes La Serena (gk coach)
- 2023–2024: Deportes Copiapó (gk coach)
- 2026–: Rangers de Talca (gk coach)
Medal record
Representing Uruguay
Copa América
Winner	1995 Uruguay	Team
- * Club domestic league appearances and goals

Jorge Claudio Arbiza Zanuttini (born 3 March 1967) is a retired Uruguayan footballer who played as a goalkeeper.

Arbiza was part of the Uruguay squad which won 1995 Copa América, although he did not play any match in the tournament.

Arbiza started his club career in 1984 with Defensor Sporting and went on to win league titles with the club in 1987 and 1991. He moved abroad in 1995 to sign for Paraguayan club Olimpia. He won the league title in the only season he spent with them.

In 1996, he moved to Chile where he won two more league titles with Colo-Colo. He returned to Uruguay in 2000 to play for Nacional, winning another two league titles. He retired in 2004.

== Honours ==
=== Club ===
Defensor Sporting Club

- Primera División Uruguaya (2): 1987, 1991

Olimpia

- Primera División Paraguaya (1): 1995

Colo-Colo

- Primera División de Chile (3): 1996, 1997–C, 1998

Nacional

- Primera División Uruguaya (2): 2001, 2002

=== International ===
- Uruguay
  - Copa América: 1995
