= Miguel Cordero (Venezuelan footballer) =

Venezuelan footballer (born 1971)

Personal information
- Date of birth: 10 November 1971 (age 54)
- Position: Defender

Senior career*
| Years | Team | Apps | (Gls) |
| 1992–1993 | Portuguesa | | |
| 1993–1994 | Marítimo | | |

International career
| 1993 | Venezuela | 1 | (0) |
- * Club domestic league appearances and goals

Miguel Cordero (born 10 November 1971) is a Venezuelan former association footballer who played as a defender.

== Career ==
Cordero played club football for Portuguesa and Marítimo.

He made one international appearance for Venezuela in 1993.
