= Sergio Hernández (Venezuelan footballer) =

Venezuelan footballer (born 1971)

Personal information
- Date of birth: 30 January 1971 (age 55)
- Position: Midfielder

International career
Years	Team	Apps	(Gls)
1993–1996	Venezuela	30	(0)

Sergio Hernández (born 30 January 1971) is a Venezuelan footballer. He played in 30 matches for the Venezuela national football team from 1993 to 1996. He was also part of Venezuela's squad for the 1993 Copa América tournament.
