= Mauro Cichero (footballer, born 1995) =

Venezuelan footballer

Personal information
- Full name: Mauro Cichero
- Date of birth: August 1, 1995 (age 31)
- Place of birth: Caracas, Venezuela
- Height: 1.96 m (6 ft 5 in)
- Positions: Midfielder; forward

College career
Years	Team	Apps	(Gls)
2014–2017	SMU Mustangs	68	(24)

Senior career*
Years	Team	Apps	(Gls)
2016	OKC Energy U-23	4	(4)
2020–2022	Charleston Battery	37	(5)
2023–2024	Forward Madison	33	(2)
Total		74	(11)
- * Club domestic league appearances and goals as of November 22, 2024

Mauro Cichero is a Venezuelan former professional footballer.

== Early life ==
Cichero was born in Venezuela and grew up in Norman, Oklahoma from preschool age until third grade, where his father worked as a soccer coach. He then moved to Spain, where he played at soccer academies in Valencia, before returning to the United States in 2011, following his mother's death. He attended Norman North High School and in 2013, he was named as the Oklahoman All-City Player of the Year. He was named the Gatorade Oklahoma Boys Soccer Player of the Year in 2013 and 2014. In 2014, he scored a bicycle kick goal to give his high school a double overtime victory, with video of the goal going viral.

== College career ==
Coming out of high school, he was considered Oklahoma's top prospect from the 2014 graduating class. He had originally committed to attend Tulsa University, but later decommitted and decided to attend Southern Methodist University and join their soccer program. Cichero was a standout performer for SMU during his four-year college career. As a freshman, he was named to the ACC Second Team and the All-Rookie Team.

In his sophomore season in 2015, he was named the AAC Offensive Player of the Year, was named to the NCAA Division I First-Team All-America, and was a semi-finalist for the MAC Hermann Trophy, which is awarded to the top college soccer player of the year.

In his senior season in 2017, he was named the AAC Midfielder of the Year and was again named to the NCAA Division I First-Team All-America. Late in the season, he suffered a serious torn ACL injury.

== Professional career ==
After his sophomore year at SMU, Cichero joined the OKC Energy U-23 of the Premier Development League for the summer. He scored 4 goals in 4 games for OKC.

In the 2018 MLS SuperDraft, he was selected 29th overall by FC Dallas. He fell in the draft due to an ACL injury suffered in his senior season at SMU. He would not play that season, but spent the year rehabbing with the club with the hope that he would join the roster the following year.

After not playing in 2018 due to rehabbing his ACL injury, he went on trial with FC Dallas's USL League One affiliate North Texas SC, in the third tier. However, due to continued injury struggles, he did not make the club's roster for 2019.

In 2020, he signed with Charleston Battery of the second tier USL Championship. He made his debut on July 19, 2020, coming on as a substitute against Birmingham Legion FC. His first goal came on August 5, when he scored in stoppage time against Atlanta United 2 to tie the game at 1-1. He re-signed with the club for the 2021 season. Early in the 2021 season, he tore his ACL, forcing him to miss the remainder of the season. After recovering from his injury, he re-signed with the club for the 2022 season. Following the 2022 season, the Battery declined his club option for 2023.

In January 2023, Cichero signed with USL League One side Forward Madison. After the season, he re-signed with the club for the 2024 season. After the 2024 season, he announced his retirement.

== Personal ==
He is the son of Mauro Cichero, who was a professional soccer player and represented Venezuela in the 1980 Summer Olympics. His brothers, Alejandro and Gabriel, are also professional soccer players who have represented the Venezuela national team. In 2018, he stated it is a dream of his to represent the national team like his father and brothers. Born in Venezuela, Cichero is of Italian and Polish descent.

== Career statistics ==
As of October 20, 2024

Club statistics
Club	Season	League			Playoffs		Domestic Cup		League Cup		Total	
Club	Season	Division	Apps	Goals	Apps	Goals	Apps	Goals	Apps	Goals	Apps	Goals
OKC Energy U23	2016	Premier Development League	4	4	0	0	—		—		4	4
Charleston Battery	2020	USL Championship	11	2	2	0	—		—		13	2
Charleston Battery	2021	USL Championship	1	0	0	0	—		—		1	0
Charleston Battery	2022	USL Championship	25	3	—		1	0	—		26	3
Charleston Battery	Total		37	5	2	0	1	0	0	0	40	5
Forward Madison FC	2023	USL League One	27	2	0	0	1	0	—		28	2
Forward Madison FC	2024	USL League One	6	0	0	0	2	0	0	0	8	0
Forward Madison FC	Total		33	2	0	0	3	0	0	0	36	2
Career total			74	11	2	0	4	0	0	0	80	11
