= Carlos García (footballer, born 1971) =

Venezuelan footballer (born 1971)

Personal information
- Full name: Carlos Jose García Mijares
- Date of birth: 12 November 1971 (age 54)
- Place of birth: Maracay, Venezuela
- Height: 1.87 m (6 ft 2 in)
- Position: Centre-back

Senior career*
Years	Team	Apps	(Gls)
- Minervén S.C.
- Deportivo Táchira
- Zulia F.C.
- Universidad de Los Andes F.C.
- CD Italchacao
- Maracaibo
- CD Italchacao
- Aragua F.C.
- Mineros de Guayana
- Aragua F.C.
- Carabobo F.C.
- Zulia F.C.
- Carabobo F.C.
- Zulia F.C.
- Carabobo F.C.

International career
	Venezuela	23	(0)
- * Club domestic league appearances and goals

Carlos Jose García Mijares (born 12 November 1971) is a Venezuelan former footballer who played as a centre-back. He made 23 appearances for the Venezuela national team from 1993 to 1997. He was also part of Venezuela's squad for the 1993 Copa América tournament.
