= Luis Filosa =

Venezuelan footballer (born 1973)

Personal information
- Full name: Luis Manuel Filosa Astudillo
- Date of birth: 15 February 1973 (age 53)
- Position: Defender

International career
Years	Team	Apps	(Gls)
1993–2000	Venezuela	30	(0)

Luis Manuel Filosa Astudillo (born 15 February 1973) is a Venezuelan former footballer. He played in 30 matches for the Venezuela national football team from 1993 to 2000. He was also part of Venezuela's squad for the 1993 Copa América tournament.
