= Gabriel Cichero =

Venezuelan football defender (born 1984)

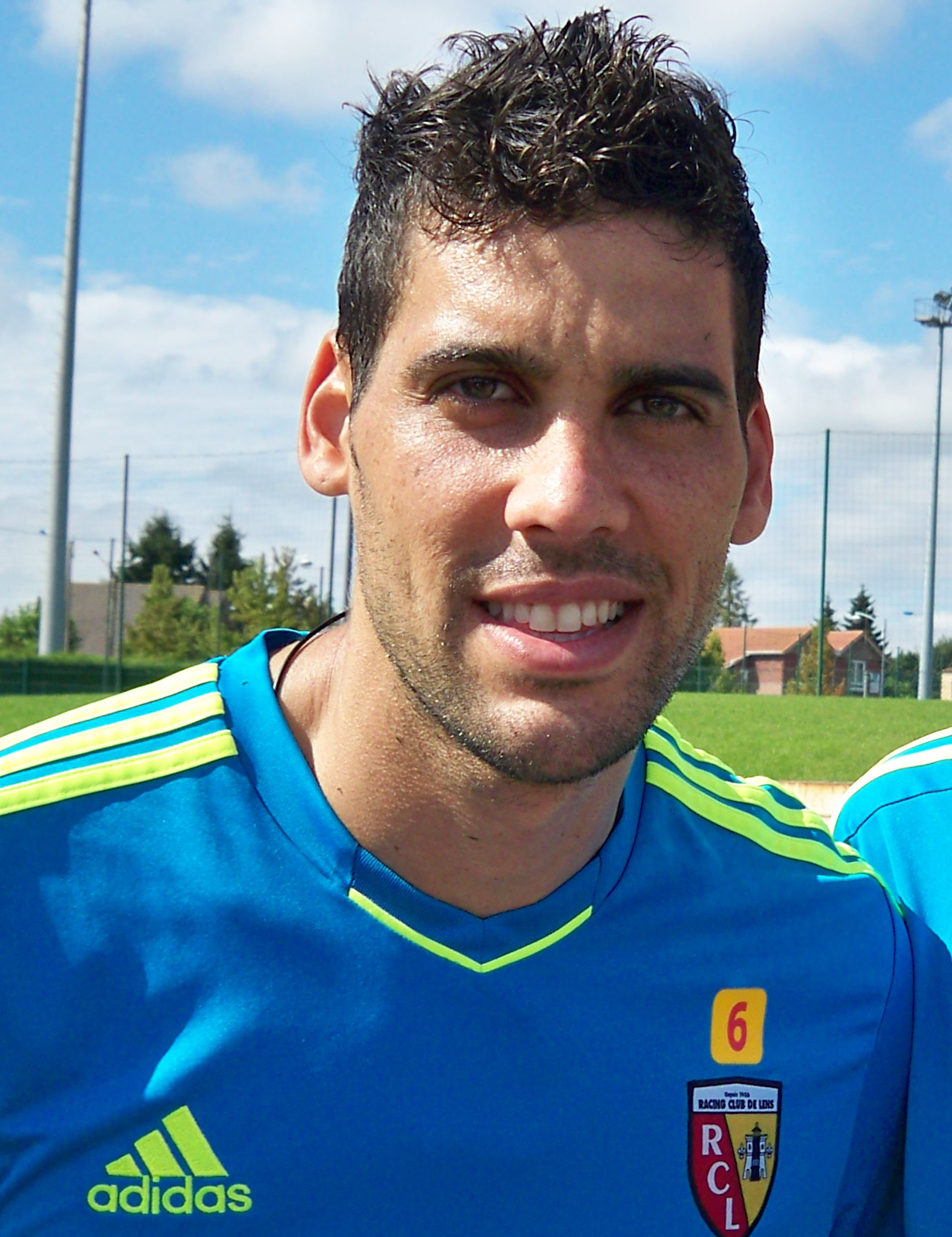
- Cichero with Lens

Personal information
- Full name: Gabriel Alejandro Cichero Konarek
- Date of birth: 25 April 1984 (age 42)
- Place of birth: Caracas, Venezuela
- Height: 1.86 m (6 ft 1 in)
- Positions: Centre-back; left back

Team information
- Current team: Los Chamos FC (AKL) (Manager)

Youth career
- 2001–2002: Montevideo Wanderers

Senior career*
Years	Team	Apps	(Gls)
2003–2006	Montevideo Wanderers	35	(0)
2006	Lecce	4	(0)
2006	Vihren Sandanski	1	(0)
2007–2009	Deportivo Italia	23	(0)
2008	→ New York Red Bulls (loan)	8	(0)
2009	→ Caracas (loan)	13	(3)
2009–2013	Caracas	26	(3)
2010–2011	→ Newell's Old Boys (loan)	23	(1)
2011–2012	→ Lens (loan)	8	(0)
2012–2013	→ Nantes (loan)	31	(2)
2013–2014	Nantes	5	(0)
2014–2016	Sion	14	(0)
2014–2015	→ Mineros de Guayana (loan)	21	(4)
2017	ACD Lara	16	(0)
2017–2018	Delhi Dynamos	15	(0)
2018–2019	Hospitalet	29	(0)
2019	Lorca Deportiva	17	(2)
2020	UA Horta	6	(0)

International career
2004–2015	Venezuela	70	(4)

Managerial career
- 2024–: Los Chamos FC (AKL)
- * Club domestic league appearances and goals

Gabriel Alejandro Cichero Konarek (born 25 April 1984) is a Venezuelan former professional footballer who played as a centre-back or left back. Currently, he is the manager for Los Chamos FC in the Américas Kings League.

== Personal life ==
He is the son of Mauro Cichero who was a professional football player and represented Venezuela in the 1980 Olympics. His brothers, Alejandro and Mauro, are also professional football players.

== Club career ==
Cichero began his professional career with Uruguayan Primera División side Montevideo Wanderers, appearing in 35 matches and scoring 1 goal. During January 2006 transfer window he was loaned to Serie A side Lecce for the remainder of the season. He then returned to Uruguay and in 2007 was transferred to Vihren Sandanski, in the Bulgarian championship. Following his stay in Bulgaria Cichero returned to his native Venezuela and signed with Deportivo Italia.

Cichero was loaned out to New York Red Bulls of Major League Soccer on 11 July 2008 in a deal that was to end in December 2008, but had an option to be extended into 2009. Numerous blunders in the handful of key late-season games he played meant that the loan was never extended and Cichero was not offered a contract. After being released by New York, he was loaned out to Caracas FC for the 2009 season.

Cichero joined Newell's Old Boys on loan for the 2010–11 Argentine Primera División season. He played 23 matches and scored once.

On 4 August 2011, it was confirmed his transfer to French side Lens, in a one-year loan with a buy option for two more years.

In 2012, Cichero joined Ligue 2 outfit Nantes on a season-long loan deal with an option to make it permanent. Nantes ended the 2012–13 season promoted back to the Ligue 1 and then he signed a permanent deal with the French top-flight team. However, he failed to find a regular first team place in the 2013–14 season and moved to Swiss side FC Sion on 27 January 2014. He was loaned out to Mineros de Guayana on 8 July 2014.

=== Indian Super League ===
On 10 August 2017, it was announced that he had been signed by Indian Super League club Delhi Dynamos FC for 2017–18 season. He played 15 matches for the Delhi-based side, which finished 8th in the league table.

== International career ==
Born in Venezuela, Cichero is of Italian and Polish descent. Gabriel Cichero has 61 caps for the Venezuela national team, and has scored four goals including the winner against Chile in the 2011 Copa América quarterfinal.

== Career statistics ==
Scores and results list Venezuela's goal tally first, score column indicates score after each Cichero goal.

List of international goals scored by Gabriel Cichero
No.	Date	Venue	Opponent	Score	Result	Competition	Ref.
1	30 April 2008	Alfonso López, Bucaramanga, Colombia	Colombia	1–1	2–5	Friendly	
2	17 July 2011	Bicentenario, San Juan, Argentina	Chile	2–1	2–1	2011 Copa América	
–	9 September 2014	International Stadium Yokohama, Japan	Japan	2–2	0–3 CON	Friendly	
3	27 March 2015	Catherine Hall Sports Complex, Montego Bay, Jamaica	Jamaica	1–0	1–2	Friendly	

== Honours ==
New York Red Bulls

- Major League Soccer Western Conference Championship: 2008

Caracas

- Venezuelan Primera División: 2009–10
- Copa Venezuela: 2009

Nantes

- In the 2012–13 Ligue 2 team of the season
