= Mauro Cichero (footballer, born 1951) =

Italian-born Venezuelan footballer (1951–2019)

Personal information
- Full name: Luigi Mauro Cichero
- Date of birth: 16 October 1951
- Place of birth: Genoa, Italy
- Date of death: 20 January 2019 (aged 67)

Senior career*
Years	Team	Apps	(Gls)
- Deportivo Italia
- Unión Deportiva Canarias
- ULA Mérida
- Grosseto

International career
1980	Venezuela	9	(0)
- * Club domestic league appearances and goals

Luigi Mauro Cichero (16 October 1951 – 20 January 2019) was a footballer who played as a central defender. Born in Italy, he represented Venezuela internationally. He competed in the men's tournament at the 1980 Summer Olympics.

== Early life ==
Cichero was born in Genoa, Italy and spent his early life there until he was 14, when his family moved to Venezuela.

== Playing career ==
Cichero played professionally in Venezuela for Deportivo Italia, Unión Deportiva Canarias, and ULA Mérida during the 1970s. He made a name for himself in Venezuela thanks to his skill, resulting in the opportunity to go to Italy and went on trial with AC Milan. While he did not make the team, he ended up moving to Serie B club Grosseto.

He also represented the Venezuela national team. His first appearances came at the seven team 1980 Olympic qualifying tournament. They came in 4th did not originally qualify for the 1980 Summer Olympics, however, Argentina was part of the 1980 Summer Olympics boycott, thereby vacating their spot, allowing Venezuela to compete in the Olympic football tournament, where he played three games and served as team captain. He also continued to represent the national team afterwards.

== Post-playing career ==
After retiring from professional football, he began his coaching career. He began working at the football school of the Colegio Campo Alegre de las Mercedes in Caracas, Venezuela and became a professor of Sport Sciences at a school and established a football program there. In 1999, he moved to Norman, Oklahoma to become the Director of Coaching for the Norman Youth Soccer Association. In 2003, he was named as the head coach of the St. Gregory's University men's soccer team in Oklahoma.

He died on 20 January 2019 in the United States, following a battle with cancer.

== Personal life ==
He is the father of professional football players Alejandro Cichero, Gabriel Cichero, and Mauro Cichero, and grandfather of Alejandro Cichero Jr.<
