= Stalin Rivas =

Venezuelan footballer (born 1971)

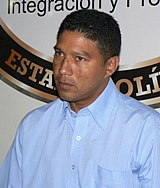

Personal information
- Full name: Stalin José Rivas
- Date of birth: 5 August 1971 (age 55)
- Place of birth: San Félix, Venezuela
- Height: 1.77 m (5 ft 10 in)
- Position: Midfielder

Senior career*
Years	Team	Apps	(Gls)
1988–1991	Mineros de Guayana		
1991–1992	Standard Liège	1	(0)
1992–1993	Boom	20	(3)
1993–1994	Minervén		(7+)
1994–2000	Caracas		
2000	Millonarios		
2000–2001	Deportivo Galicia	4	(2)
2001–2002	Italchacao		
2002–2004	Caracas		
2004	Italmaracaibo	12	(2)
2005	Deportivo Táchira	7	(0)
2005–2006	Mineros de Guayana	10	(1)

International career
1989–1996	Venezuela	34	(3)

Managerial career
- 2006: Guaros FC
- 2007: Anzoátegui
- 2008: Mineros de Guayana
- * Club domestic league appearances and goals

Stalin José Rivas (born 5 August 1971 in San Félix, Venezuela) is a Venezuelan former footballer who played as a midfielder. He is described as "the most naturally talented Venezuelan footballer of all time".

== Club career ==
During his professional career, Rivas played for several clubs in Latin America and Belgium, including Caracas Fútbol Club, Club Deportivo Los Millonarios and Standard Liège.

== International career ==
Rivas received 34 caps, scoring 3 goals, for the Venezuela national football team between 1989 and 1996.

=== International goals ===
Goal	Date	Venue	Opponent	Score	Result	Competition
1.	25 June 1989	Pueblo Nuevo, San Cristóbal, Venezuela	Peru	3–0	3–0	Friendly
2.	21 May 1993	El Campín, Bogotá, Colombia	Colombia	1–1	1-1	Friendly
3.	19 June 1993	Estadio Bellavista, Ambato, Ecuador	Uruguay	1–2	2–2	1993 Copa América
