= William González (footballer) =

Venezuelan footballer (born 1969)

Personal information
- Date of birth: 27 December 1969 (age 56)

International career
Years	Team	Apps	(Gls)
1995–1997	Venezuela	20	(0)

William González (born 27 December 1969) is a Venezuelan footballer. He played in twenty matches for the Venezuela national football team from 1995 to 1997. He was also part of Venezuela's squad for the 1997 Copa América tournament.
