= 1999 Copa América squads =

List of footballers

Below are the rosters of the teams that participated in the 1999 Copa América.

== Group A ==
=== Bolivia ===
Head coach: (Argentina) Héctor Veira

No.	Pos.	Player	Date of birth (age)	Caps	Goals	Club
1	GK	José Carlos Fernández	24 January 1971 (aged 28)			(Bolivia) Blooming
2	DF	Juan Manuel Peña	17 January 1973 (aged 26)			(Spain) Real Valladolid
3	DF	Marco Sandy	29 August 1971 (aged 27)			(Argentina) Gimnasia de Jujuy
4	DF	Miguel Rimba	1 November 1967 (aged 31)			(Argentina) Atlético Tucumán
5	DF	Óscar Sánchez	16 July 1971 (aged 27)			(Argentina) Independiente
6	DF	Fernando Ochoaizpur	18 March 1971 (aged 28)			(Mexico) San Luis
7	MF	Limberg Gutiérrez	19 November 1977 (aged 21)			(Bolivia) Blooming
8	MF	Rubén Tufiño	9 January 1970 (aged 29)			(Bolivia) Blooming
9	FW	Jaime Moreno	19 January 1974 (aged 25)			(United States) D.C. United
10	MF	Marco Etcheverry	26 September 1970 (aged 28)			(United States) D.C. United
11	FW	Milton Coimbra	4 May 1975 (aged 24)			(Bolivia) Oriente Petrolero
12	GK	Sergio Galarza	25 August 1975 (aged 23)			(Bolivia) Real Santa Cruz
13	MF	Luis Liendo	25 February 1978 (aged 21)			(Bolivia) Bolívar
14	DF	Adrián Ubaldo Lozano	17 May 1972 (aged 27)			(Bolivia) Bolívar
15	DF	Luis Cristaldo	31 August 1969 (aged 29)			(Spain) Sporting de Gijón
16	MF	Vladimir Soria (c)	15 July 1964 (aged 34)			(Bolivia) Bolívar
17	MF	Raúl Justiniano	29 September 1977 (aged 21)			(Bolivia) Blooming
18	DF	Gustavo Quinteros	15 February 1965 (aged 34)			(Bolivia) Jorge Wilstermann
19	DF	Iván Castillo	11 July 1970 (aged 28)			(Argentina) Gimnasia de Jujuy
20	DF	Renny Ribera	30 January 1974 (aged 25)			(Bolivia) Blooming
21	MF	Erwin Sánchez	19 October 1969 (aged 29)			(Portugal) Boavista
22	FW	Víctor Hugo Antelo	2 November 1964 (aged 34)			(Bolivia) Blooming

=== Japan ===
Head coach: (France) Philippe Troussier

No.	Pos.	Player	Date of birth (age)	Caps	Goals	Club
1	GK	Yoshikatsu Kawaguchi	15 August 1975 (aged 23)			(Japan) Yokohama F. Marinos
2	DF	Toshihide Saito	20 April 1973 (aged 26)			(Japan) Shimizu S-Pulse
3	DF	Naoki Soma	19 July 1971 (aged 27)			(Japan) Kashima Antlers
4	DF	Masami Ihara (c)	18 September 1967 (aged 31)			(Japan) Yokohama F. Marinos
5	DF	Yutaka Akita	6 August 1970 (aged 28)			(Japan) Kashima Antlers
6	DF	Toshihiro Hattori	23 September 1973 (aged 25)			(Japan) Júbilo Iwata
7	MF	Teruyoshi Ito	31 August 1974 (aged 24)			(Japan) Shimizu S-Pulse
8	MF	Shigeyoshi Mochizuki	9 July 1973 (aged 25)			(Japan) Nagoya Grampus
9	FW	Kota Yoshihara	2 February 1978 (aged 21)			(Japan) Consadole Sapporo
10	MF	Hiroshi Nanami	28 November 1972 (aged 26)			(Japan) Júbilo Iwata
11	FW	Wagner Lopes	29 January 1969 (aged 30)			(Japan) Nagoya Grampus
12	FW	Shoji Jo	17 June 1975 (aged 24)			(Japan) Yokohama F. Marinos
13	MF	Toshiya Fujita	4 October 1971 (aged 27)			(Japan) Júbilo Iwata
14	DF	Hideto Suzuki	7 October 1974 (aged 24)			(Japan) Júbilo Iwata
15	MF	Kazuaki Tasaka	3 August 1971 (aged 27)			(Japan) Shimizu S-Pulse
16	MF	Daisuke Oku	7 February 1976 (aged 23)			(Japan) Júbilo Iwata
17	DF	Ryuzo Morioka	7 October 1975 (aged 23)			(Japan) Shimizu S-Pulse
18	MF	Masahiro Ando	2 April 1972 (aged 27)			(Japan) Shimizu S-Pulse
19	MF	Atsuhiro Miura	24 June 1974 (aged 25)			(Japan) Yokohama F. Marinos
20	GK	Seigo Narazaki	15 April 1976 (aged 23)			(Japan) Nagoya Grampus
21	FW	Masayuki Okano	25 July 1972 (aged 26)			(Japan) Urawa Red Diamonds
22	MF	Takashi Fukunishi	1 September 1976 (aged 22)			(Japan) Júbilo Iwata

=== Paraguay ===
Head coach: Ever Almeida

No.	Pos.	Player	Date of birth (age)	Caps	Goals	Club
1	GK	Ricardo Tavarelli	2 August 1970 (aged 28)			(Paraguay) Olimpia
2	DF	Francisco Arce	2 April 1971 (aged 28)			(Brazil) Palmeiras
3	DF	Celso Ayala (c)	20 August 1970 (aged 28)			(Spain) Real Betis
4	DF	Carlos Gamarra	17 February 1971 (aged 28)			(Brazil) Corinthians
5	DF	Delio Toledo	2 October 1976 (aged 22)			(Paraguay) Cerro Porteño
6	MF	Julio César Enciso	5 August 1974 (aged 24)			(Brazil) Internacional
7	MF	Diego Gavilán	1 March 1980 (aged 19)			(Paraguay) Cerro Porteño
8	MF	Roberto Acuña	25 March 1972 (aged 27)			(Spain) Real Zaragoza
9	FW	Miguel Ángel Benítez	19 May 1970 (aged 29)			(Spain) Espanyol
10	MF	Guido Alvarenga	24 August 1970 (aged 28)			(Paraguay) Cerro Porteño
11	FW	Roque Santa Cruz	16 August 1981 (aged 17)			(Paraguay) Olimpia
12	GK	Justo Villar	30 June 1977 (aged 21)			(Paraguay) Sol de América
13	MF	Carlos Estigarribia	21 November 1974 (aged 24)			(Paraguay) Sportivo Luqueño
14	FW	Nelson Cuevas	10 January 1980 (aged 19)			(Argentina) River Plate
15	FW	Mauro Caballero	3 May 1972 (aged 27)			(Paraguay) Cerro Porteño
16	MF	Carlos González	30 March 1976 (aged 23)			(Paraguay) Cerro Corá
17	MF	Carlos Paredes	16 July 1976 (aged 22)			(Paraguay) Olimpia
18	MF	Hugo Ovelar	21 February 1971 (aged 28)			(Mexico) Santos Laguna
19	DF	Silvio Suárez	5 January 1969 (aged 30)			(Argentina) Talleres de Córdoba
20	DF	Dani Cáceres	6 October 1973 (aged 25)			(Paraguay) Guaraní
21	DF	Denis Caniza	29 August 1974 (aged 24)			(Paraguay) Olimpia
22	GK	Danilo Aceval	15 September 1975 (aged 23)			(Paraguay) Cerro Porteño

=== Peru ===
Head coach: Juan Carlos Oblitas

No.	Pos.	Player	Date of birth (age)	Caps	Goals	Club
1	GK	Óscar Ibáñez	8 August 1967 (aged 31)			(Peru) Universitario
2	DF	Miguel Rebosio	20 October 1976 (aged 22)			(Peru) Sporting Cristal
3	DF	Juan Reynoso (c)	28 December 1969 (aged 29)			(Mexico) Cruz Azul
4	DF	Percy Olivares	5 June 1968 (aged 31)			(Greece) PAOK
5	MF	José Pereda	8 September 1973 (aged 25)			(Argentina) Boca Juniors
6	DF	José Soto	11 January 1970 (aged 29)			(Peru) Alianza Lima
7	MF	Nolberto Solano	12 December 1974 (aged 24)			(England) Newcastle United
8	MF	Juan Jayo	20 January 1973 (aged 26)			(Argentina) Unión de Santa Fe
9	FW	Flavio Maestri	21 January 1973 (aged 26)			Universidad de Chile
10	MF	Roberto Palacios	28 December 1972 (aged 26)			(Mexico) UAG
11	FW	Claudio Pizarro	3 October 1978 (aged 20)			(Peru) Alianza Lima
12	GK	Miguel Miranda	13 August 1966 (aged 32)			(Peru) Deportivo Pesquero
13	MF	Juan Velásquez	20 March 1971 (aged 28)			(Peru) Deportivo Pesquero
14	MF	Jorge Soto	27 October 1971 (aged 27)			(Peru) Sporting Cristal
15	FW	Andrés Mendoza	26 April 1978 (aged 21)			(Peru) Sporting Cristal
16	DF	Luis Guadalupe	3 April 1976 (aged 23)			(Peru) Universitario
17	FW	Roberto Holsen	10 August 1976 (aged 22)			(Peru) Alianza Lima
18	DF	José Luis Chacón	6 November 1971 (aged 27)			(Peru) Alianza Lima
19	MF	Marko Ciurlizza	22 February 1978 (aged 21)	0		(Peru) Universitario
20	MF	Javier Soria	15 December 1974 (aged 24)			(Peru) Alianza Atlético
21	GK	Leao Butrón	6 March 1977 (aged 22)			(Peru) Sporting Cristal
22	FW	Ysrael Zúñiga	27 August 1976 (aged 22)			(Peru) Melgar

== Group B ==
=== Brazil ===
Head coach: Vanderlei Luxemburgo

No.	Pos.	Player	Date of birth (age)	Caps	Goals	Club
1	GK	Dida	7 October 1973 (aged 25)			(Switzerland) Lugano
2	DF	Cafu (c)	7 June 1970 (aged 29)			(Italy) Roma
3	DF	Odvan	26 March 1974 (aged 25)			(Brazil) Vasco da Gama
4	DF	Antônio Carlos	14 March 1969 (aged 30)			(Italy) Roma
5	MF	Emerson	4 April 1976 (aged 23)			(Germany) Bayer Leverkusen
6	DF	Roberto Carlos	10 April 1973 (aged 26)			(Spain) Real Madrid
7	FW	Amoroso	5 July 1974 (aged 24)			(Italy) Udinese
8	MF	Vampeta	13 March 1974 (aged 25)			(Brazil) Corinthians
9	FW	Ronaldo	22 September 1976 (aged 22)			(Italy) Inter
10	FW	Rivaldo	19 April 1972 (aged 27)			(Spain) Barcelona
11	MF	Alex	14 September 1977 (aged 21)			(Brazil) Palmeiras
12	GK	Marcos	4 August 1973 (aged 25)			(Brazil) Palmeiras
13	DF	Evanílson	12 September 1975 (aged 23)			(Brazil) Cruzeiro
14	DF	César Belli	16 November 1975 (aged 23)			(Brazil) Portuguesa
15	DF	João Carlos	10 September 1972 (aged 26)			(Brazil) Corinthians
16	DF	Serginho	27 June 1971 (aged 28)			(Brazil) São Paulo
17	MF	Marcos Paulo	11 May 1977 (aged 22)			(Brazil) Cruzeiro
18	MF	Flávio Conceição	13 June 1974 (aged 25)			(Spain) Deportivo La Coruña
19	MF	Beto	7 January 1975 (aged 24)			(Brazil) Flamengo
20	FW	Christian	23 April 1975 (aged 24)			(Brazil) Internacional
21	FW	Ronaldinho	21 March 1980 (aged 19)			(Brazil) Grêmio
22	MF	Zé Roberto	6 July 1974 (aged 24)			(Germany) Bayer Leverkusen

=== Chile ===
Head coach: (Uruguay) Nelson Acosta

No.	Pos.	Player	Date of birth (age)	Caps	Goals	Club
1	GK	Marcelo Ramírez	29 May 1965 (aged 34)			(Chile) Colo-Colo
2	MF	Raúl Palacios	30 October 1976 (aged 22)			(Chile) Santiago Morning
3	DF	Miguel Ramírez	11 June 1970 (aged 29)			(Chile) Universidad Católica
4	DF	Francisco Rojas	22 July 1974 (aged 24)			(Chile) Colo-Colo
5	DF	Javier Margas	10 May 1969 (aged 30)			(England) West Ham United
6	DF	Pedro Reyes	13 November 1972 (aged 26)			(France) Auxerre
7	MF	Nelson Parraguez	5 April 1971 (aged 28)			(Chile) Universidad Católica
8	MF	Clarence Acuña	8 February 1975 (aged 24)			Universidad de Chile
9	FW	Iván Zamorano (c)	18 January 1967 (aged 32)			(Italy) Inter Milan
10	MF	José Luis Sierra	5 December 1968 (aged 30)			(Mexico) UANL
11	FW	Marcelo Salas	24 December 1974 (aged 24)			(Italy) Lazio
12	GK	Nelson Tapia	22 June 1966 (aged 33)			(Chile) Universidad Católica
13	DF	Jorge Vargas	8 February 1976 (aged 23)			(Chile) Universidad Católica
14	MF	Roberto Cartes	6 September 1972 (aged 26)			(Argentina) Argentinos Juniors
15	MF	Moisés Villarroel	12 February 1976 (aged 23)			(Chile) Santiago Wanderers
16	MF	Mauricio Aros	9 May 1976 (aged 23)			Universidad de Chile
17	FW	Claudio Núñez	16 October 1975 (aged 23)			(Mexico) UANL
18	FW	Pedro González	17 October 1967 (aged 31)			Universidad de Chile
19	MF	Esteban Valencia	8 January 1972 (aged 27)			Universidad de Chile
20	MF	Fabián Estay	5 October 1968 (aged 30)			(Mexico) Toluca
21	DF	Pablo Contreras	11 September 1978 (aged 20)			(Chile) Colo-Colo
22	MF	David Pizarro	11 September 1979 (aged 19)			(Italy) Udinese

=== Mexico ===
Head coach: (Mexico) Manuel Lapuente

No.	Pos.	Player	Date of birth (age)	Caps	Goals	Club
1	GK	Jorge Campos	15 October 1966 (aged 32)			(Mexico) UNAM
2	DF	Claudio Suárez	17 December 1968 (aged 30)			(Mexico) Guadalajara
3	DF	Joel Sánchez	17 August 1974 (aged 24)			(Mexico) Guadalajara
4	DF	Rafael Márquez	13 February 1979 (aged 20)			(Mexico) Atlas
5	MF	Gerardo Torrado	30 April 1979 (aged 20)			(Mexico) UNAM
6	MF	Raúl Lara	28 February 1973 (aged 26)			(Mexico) América
7	MF	Ramón Ramírez	5 December 1969 (aged 29)			(Mexico) América
8	MF	Alberto García Aspe (c)	11 May 1967 (aged 32)			(Mexico) América
9	MF	Paulo Chávez	7 January 1976 (aged 23)			(Mexico) Guadalajara
10	FW	Cuauhtémoc Blanco	17 January 1973 (aged 26)			(Mexico) América
11	FW	Daniel Osorno	16 March 1979 (aged 20)			(Mexico) Atlas
12	GK	Óscar Pérez	1 February 1973 (aged 26)			(Mexico) Cruz Azul
13	MF	Pável Pardo	26 July 1976 (aged 22)			(Mexico) UAG
14	DF	Isaac Terrazas	23 June 1973 (aged 26)			(Mexico) América
15	FW	Luis Hernández	17 August 1968 (aged 30)			(Mexico) UANL
16	MF	Salvador Cabrera	21 August 1973 (aged 25)			(Mexico) Necaxa
17	FW	Francisco Palencia	28 April 1973 (aged 26)			(Mexico) Cruz Azul
18	DF	Salvador Carmona	22 August 1975 (aged 23)			(Mexico) Toluca
19	MF	Miguel Zepeda	25 May 1976 (aged 23)			(Mexico) Atlas
20	DF	Rafael García	14 August 1974 (aged 24)			(Mexico) Toluca
21	DF	Sergio Almaguer	16 May 1969 (aged 30)			(Mexico) Necaxa
22	GK	Adolfo Ríos	11 December 1966 (aged 32)			(Mexico) Necaxa

=== Venezuela ===
Head coach: (Argentina) José Omar Pastoriza

No.	Pos.	Player	Date of birth (age)	Caps	Goals	Club
1	GK	Renny Vega	4 July 1979 (aged 19)			(Venezuela) Nacional Táchira
2	DF	Rolando Álvarez	14 December 1975 (aged 23)			(Venezuela) Internacional de Lara
3	DF	Jorge Rojas	10 January 1977 (aged 22)			(Venezuela) Estudiantes de Mérida
4	DF	David McIntosh	17 February 1973 (aged 26)			(Venezuela) Caracas
5	MF	Héctor Bidoglio	5 February 1968 (aged 31)			(Venezuela) Caracas
6	DF	José Manuel Rey	20 May 1975 (aged 24)			(Ecuador) Emelec
7	FW	Daniel Noriega	30 March 1977 (aged 22)			(Argentina) Unión de Santa Fe
8	MF	Edson Tortolero (c)	27 August 1971 (aged 27)			(Venezuela) ULA Mérida
9	FW	Juan Enrique García	16 April 1970 (aged 29)			(Venezuela) ULA Mérida
10	MF	Gabriel Urdaneta	7 January 1976 (aged 23)			(Venezuela) ULA Mérida
11	MF	Félix José Hernández	18 April 1972 (aged 27)			(Mexico) Atlético Celaya
12	GK	Manuel Sanhouse	16 July 1975 (aged 23)			(Venezuela) Deportivo Italchacao
13	FW	Alexander Rondón	30 August 1977 (aged 21)			(Venezuela) Nueva Cádiz
14	MF	Leopoldo Jiménez	22 May 1978 (aged 21)			(Venezuela) Deportivo Italchacao
15	MF	Miguel Mea Vitali	19 February 1981 (aged 18)			(Venezuela) Caracas
16	MF	José Duno	19 March 1977 (aged 22)			(Venezuela) Nueva Cádiz
17	DF	Miguel Echenausi	21 February 1968 (aged 31)			(Venezuela) Estudiantes de Mérida
18	DF	Gerzon Chacón	25 November 1980 (aged 18)			(Venezuela) Deportivo Táchira
19	MF	Juan Arango	16 May 1980 (aged 19)			(Venezuela) Nueva Cádiz
20	FW	Cristian Cásseres	29 June 1977 (aged 22)			(Venezuela) Deportivo Italchacao
21	MF	José de Jesús Vera	9 February 1969 (aged 30)			(Venezuela) Estudiantes de Mérida
22	FW	Ruberth Morán	11 August 1973 (aged 25)			(Venezuela) Estudiantes de Mérida

== Group C ==
=== Argentina ===
Head coach: Marcelo Bielsa

No.	Pos.	Player	Date of birth (age)	Caps	Goals	Club
1	GK	Germán Burgos	16 April 1969 (aged 30)			(Argentina) River Plate
2	DF	Roberto Ayala (c)	14 April 1973 (aged 26)			(Italy) Milan
3	DF	Juan Pablo Sorín	5 May 1976 (aged 23)			(Argentina) River Plate
4	DF	Hugo Ibarra	1 April 1974 (aged 25)			(Argentina) Boca Juniors
5	MF	Diego Simeone	28 April 1970 (aged 29)			(Italy) Inter Milan
6	DF	Walter Samuel	23 March 1978 (aged 21)			(Argentina) Boca Juniors
7	FW	Guillermo Barros Schelotto	4 May 1973 (aged 26)			(Argentina) Boca Juniors
8	DF	Javier Zanetti	10 August 1973 (aged 25)			(Italy) Inter Milan
9	FW	Martín Palermo	7 November 1973 (aged 25)			(Argentina) Boca Juniors
10	FW	Ariel Ortega	4 March 1974 (aged 25)			(Italy) Sampdoria
11	MF	Gustavo Adrián López	13 April 1973 (aged 26)			(Spain) Real Zaragoza
12	GK	Albano Bizzarri	9 November 1977 (aged 21)			(Argentina) Racing de Avellaneda
13	DF	Nelson Vivas	18 October 1969 (aged 29)			(England) Arsenal
14	DF	Mauricio Pochettino	2 March 1972 (aged 27)			(Spain) Espanyol
15	DF	Eduardo Berizzo	13 November 1969 (aged 29)			(Argentina) River Plate
16	MF	Andrés Guglielminpietro	10 April 1974 (aged 25)			(Italy) Milan
17	MF	Claudio Husaín	20 November 1974 (aged 24)			(Argentina) Vélez Sarsfield
18	MF	Diego Cagna	19 April 1970 (aged 29)			(Argentina) Boca Juniors
19	FW	José Luis Calderón	24 October 1970 (aged 28)			(Argentina) Independiente
20	MF	Pablo Aimar	3 November 1979 (aged 19)			(Argentina) River Plate
21	MF	Kily González	4 August 1974 (aged 24)			(Spain) Real Zaragoza
22	MF	Juan Román Riquelme	24 June 1978 (aged 21)			(Argentina) Boca Juniors

=== Colombia ===
Head coach: Javier Álvarez Arteaga

No.	Pos.	Player	Date of birth (age)	Caps	Goals	Club
1	GK	Miguel Calero	14 April 1971 (aged 28)			(Colombia) Atlético Nacional
2	DF	Iván Córdoba	11 August 1976 (aged 22)			(Argentina) San Lorenzo
3	DF	Roberto Carlos Cortés	20 June 1977 (aged 22)			(Colombia) Independiente Medellín
4	DF	Alexander Viveros	8 October 1977 (aged 21)			(Colombia) Deportivo Cali
5	DF	Jorge Bermúdez (c)	18 June 1971 (aged 28)			(Argentina) Boca Juniors
6	MF	Juan Carlos Ramírez	22 March 1972 (aged 27)			(Colombia) Independiente Medellín
7	FW	Edwin Congo	7 October 1976 (aged 22)			(Colombia) Once Caldas
8	MF	Harold Lozano	30 March 1972 (aged 27)			(Spain) Real Valladolid
9	FW	Víctor Bonilla	23 January 1971 (aged 28)			(Colombia) Deportivo Cali
10	MF	Neider Morantes	3 August 1975 (aged 23)			(Colombia) Atlético Nacional
11	FW	Henry Zambrano	7 August 1973 (aged 25)			(Colombia) Atlético Nacional
12	GK	René Higuita	27 August 1966 (aged 32)			(Colombia) Independiente Medellín
13	MF	Jorge Bolaño	28 April 1977 (aged 22)			(Colombia) Atlético Junior
14	MF	Arley Betancourth	4 March 1975 (aged 24)			(Colombia) Deportivo Cali
15	DF	Pedro Portocarrero	5 July 1977 (aged 21)			(Colombia) Independiente Santa Fe
16	DF	Jersson González	16 February 1975 (aged 24)			(Colombia) América de Cali
17	FW	Johnnier Montaño	14 January 1983 (aged 16)			(Argentina) Quilmes
18	MF	Rubiel Quintana	26 June 1978 (aged 21)			(Colombia) Cortuluá
19	FW	Hámilton Ricard	1 January 1974 (aged 25)			(England) Middlesbrough
20	MF	Freddy Grisales	22 September 1975 (aged 23)			(Colombia) Atlético Nacional
21	DF	Mario Yepes	13 January 1976 (aged 23)			(Colombia) Deportivo Cali
22	GK	Agustín Julio	25 October 1974 (aged 24)			(Colombia) Independiente Santa Fe

=== Ecuador ===
Head coach: Carlos Sevilla

No.	Pos.	Player	Date of birth (age)	Caps	Goals	Club
1	GK	José Cevallos	17 April 1971 (aged 28)			(Ecuador) Barcelona SC
2	DF	Dannes Coronel	24 May 1973 (aged 26)			(Ecuador) Emelec
3	DF	Iván Hurtado	16 August 1974 (aged 24)			(Mexico) UANL
4	DF	Franklin Anangonó	12 December 1974 (aged 24)			(Mexico) Cuautitlán
5	DF	Alberto Montaño (c)	23 March 1970 (aged 29)			(Ecuador) Barcelona SC
6	DF	Ulises de la Cruz	8 February 1974 (aged 25)			(Ecuador) LDU Quito
7	MF	Luis Moreira	1 December 1978 (aged 20)			(Ecuador) Emelec
8	MF	Jimmy Blandón	1 January 1969 (aged 30)			(Ecuador) Deportivo Cuenca
9	FW	Ariel Graziani	7 June 1971 (aged 28)			(Mexico) Morelia
10	MF	Álex Aguinaga	9 July 1968 (aged 30)			(Mexico) Necaxa
11	FW	Nicolás Asencio	26 April 1975 (aged 24)			(Mexico) UAG
12	FW	Iván Kaviedes	24 October 1977 (aged 21)			(Italy) Perugia
13	FW	Agustín Delgado	23 December 1974 (aged 24)			(Mexico) Necaxa
14	MF	Marlon Ayoví	27 September 1971 (aged 27)			(Ecuador) Deportivo Quito
15	MF	Moisés Candelario	10 October 1978 (aged 20)			(Ecuador) Emelec
16	MF	Héctor Carabalí	15 February 1972 (aged 27)			(Brazil) São Paulo
17	DF	Fricson George	16 September 1974 (aged 24)			(Ecuador) Barcelona SC
18	DF	Bolívar Gómez	31 July 1977 (aged 21)			(Ecuador) El Nacional
19	MF	Jairon Zamora	5 February 1978 (aged 21)			(Ecuador) El Nacional
20	MF	Wellington Sánchez	19 June 1974 (aged 25)			(Ecuador) Emelec
21	DF	Hólger Quiñónez	18 August 1962 (aged 36)			(Ecuador) Barcelona SC
22	GK	Oswaldo Ibarra	8 September 1969 (aged 29)			(Ecuador) El Nacional

=== Uruguay ===
Head coach: Víctor Púa

No.	Pos.	Player	Date of birth (age)	Caps	Goals	Club
1	GK	Fabián Carini	26 December 1979 (aged 19)	1	0	(Uruguay) Danubio
2	DF	Diego López (c)	22 August 1974 (aged 24)	17	0	(Italy) Cagliari
3	DF	Fernando Picun	14 February 1972 (aged 27)	3	0	(Uruguay) Defensor Sporting
4	MF	Leonel Pilipauskas	18 May 1975 (aged 24)	1	0	(Uruguay) Bella Vista
5	MF	Andrés Fleurquin	2 August 1975 (aged 23)	2	0	(Uruguay) Defensor Sporting
6	MF	Gianni Guigou	22 February 1975 (aged 24)	0	0	(Uruguay) Nacional
7	MF	Fabián Coelho	20 January 1977 (aged 22)	2	0	(Uruguay) Nacional
8	MF	Líber Vespa	18 October 1971 (aged 27)	8	0	(Argentina) Rosario Central
9	FW	Marcelo Zalayeta	5 December 1978 (aged 20)	6	2	(Italy) Empoli
10	FW	Federico Magallanes	28 August 1976 (aged 22)	4	2	(Spain) Racing de Santander
11	FW	Gabriel Álvez	26 December 1974 (aged 24)	1	1	(Uruguay) Nacional
12	GK	Álvaro Núñez	11 May 1973 (aged 26)	0	0	(Uruguay) Rentistas
13	MF	Inti Podestá	23 April 1978 (aged 21)	1	0	(Uruguay) Danubio
14	DF	Alejandro Lembo	15 February 1978 (aged 21)	1	0	(Uruguay) Bella Vista
15	DF	Fabián Pumar	14 February 1976 (aged 23)	0	0	(Uruguay) Bella Vista
16	MF	Marcelo Romero	4 July 1976 (aged 22)	8	0	(Uruguay) Peñarol
17	DF	Martín del Campo	24 May 1975 (aged 24)	0	0	(Uruguay) Nacional
18	MF	Pablo García	11 May 1977 (aged 22)	6	0	(Spain) Atlético Madrid
19	FW	Diego Alonso	16 April 1975 (aged 24)	1	0	(Uruguay) Bella Vista
20	MF	Christian Callejas	17 May 1978 (aged 21)	5	1	(Uruguay) Danubio
21	FW	Antonio Pacheco	11 April 1976 (aged 23)	4	1	(Uruguay) Peñarol
22	DF	Federico Bergara	19 December 1971 (aged 27)	1	0	(Uruguay) Nacional
