= 1999 Copa América Group C =

The Group C of the 1999 Copa América was one of the three groups of competing nations in the 1999 Copa América. It comprised Argentina, Colombia, Ecuador, and Uruguay. Group play began on July 1 and ended on July 7.

Colombia won the group and faced Chile, the best third-placed finisher, in the quarterfinals. Argentina finished second and faced Brazil, the winners of Group B, in the quarterfinals. Uruguay finished third and faced Paraguay, the winner of Group A, in the quarterfinals. Ecuador finished fourth in the group and was eliminated from the tournament.

== Standings ==
Team	Pld	W	D	L	GF	GA	GD	Pts
Colombia	3	3	0	0	6	1	+5	9
Argentina	3	2	0	1	5	4	+1	6
Uruguay	3	1	0	2	2	4	−2	3
Ecuador	3	0	0	3	3	7	−4	0

Teams that advanced to the quarterfinals

- Group winners
- Group runners-up
- Best two third-placed teams among all groups

== Matches ==
=== Uruguay v Colombia ===
1 July 1999
19:05

Uruguay	0–1	Colombia
	Report	Bonilla 20'

Estadio General Pablo Rojas, Asunción
Attendance: 8,000
Referee: Wilson de Souza (Brazil)

Uruguay	Colombia

GK	1	Fabián Carini
DF	4	Leonel Pilipauskas
DF	2	Diego López	(red card) 68'
DF	14	Alejandro Lembo
DF	22	Federico Bergara		(substituted off) 58'
MF	8	Líber Vespa		(substituted off) 46'
MF	5	Andrés Fleurquin	(yellow card) 23'	(substituted off) 70'
MF	7	Fabián Coelho
FW	10	Federico Magallanes	(yellow card) 9' (red card) 90+2'
FW	11	Gabriel Álvez
FW	9	Marcelo Zalayeta
Substitutions:
MF	6	Gianni Guigou		(substituted in) 46'
MF	20	Christian Callejas		(substituted in) 58'
MF	3	Fernando Picun		(substituted in) 70'
Manager:
Víctor Púa

GK	1	Miguel Calero
DF	4	Alexander Viveros
DF	5	Jorge Bermúdez	(yellow card) 34'
DF	2	Iván Córdoba
MF	18	Rubiel Quintana
MF	13	Jorge Bolaño	(yellow card) 40'
MF	8	Harold Lozano
MF	20	Freddy Grisales		(substituted off) 80'
MF	14	Arley Betancourth	(yellow card) 56'
FW	9	Víctor Bonilla		(substituted off) 66'
FW	19	Hámilton Ricard		(substituted off) 59'
Substitutions:
FW	17	Johnnier Montaño		(substituted in) 59'
FW	11	Henry Zambrano		(substituted in) 66'
MF	6	Juan Carlos Ramírez		(substituted in) 80'
Manager:
Javier Álvarez Arteaga

=== Argentina v Ecuador ===
1 July 1999
21:05

Argentina	3–1	Ecuador
Simeone 12'; Palermo 55', 61'	Report	Kaviedes 77'

Estadio Feliciano Cáceres, Luque
Attendance: 12,000
Referee: Gilberto Hidalgo (Peru)

Argentina	Ecuador

GK	1	Germán Burgos
DF	4	Hugo Ibarra
DF	2	Roberto Ayala
DF	6	Walter Samuel	(yellow card) 89'
DF	8	Javier Zanetti
MF	5	Diego Simeone
MF	3	Juan Pablo Sorín
MF	22	Juan Román Riquelme		(substituted off) 90'
MF	11	Gustavo López		(substituted off) 67'
MF	7	Guillermo Barros Schelotto		(substituted off) 75'
FW	9	Martín Palermo
Substitutions:
DF	16	Andrés Guglielminpietro		(substituted in) 67'
MF	21	Kily González		(substituted in) 75'
MF	18	Diego Cagna		(substituted in) 90'
Manager:
Marcelo Bielsa

GK	1	José Cevallos
DF	3	Iván Hurtado
DF	5	Alberto Montaño
DF	21	Hólger Quiñónez	(yellow card) 64'
DF	6	Ulises de la Cruz
MF	17	Fricson George
MF	8	Jimmy Blandón
MF	16	Héctor Carabalí		(substituted off) 59'
MF	7	Luis Moreira		(substituted off) 59'
FW	13	Agustín Delgado		(substituted off) 46'
FW	9	Ariel Graziani
Substitutions:
FW	22	Iván Kaviedes		(substituted in) 46'
MF	10	Álex Aguinaga		(substituted in) 59'
MF	19	Jairon Zamora		(substituted in) 59'
Manager:
Carlos Sevilla

=== Uruguay v Ecuador ===
4 July 1999
15:05

Uruguay	2–1	Ecuador
Zalayeta 72', 74'	Report	Kaviedes 78'

Estadio Feliciano Cáceres, Luque
Attendance: 15,000
Referee: Mario Sánchez (Chile)

Uruguay	Ecuador

GK	1	Fabián Carini
DF	4	Leonel Pilipauskas
DF	3	Fernando Picun
DF	14	Alejandro Lembo
DF	22	Federico Bergara		(substituted off) 66'
MF	7	Fabián Coelho		(substituted off) 78'
MF	5	Andrés Fleurquin
MF	18	Pablo García	(yellow card) 62'
FW	21	Antonio Pacheco		(substituted off) 65'
FW	11	Gabriel Álvez
FW	9	Marcelo Zalayeta
Substitutions:
MF	20	Christian Callejas		(substituted in) 65'
MF	6	Gianni Guigou		(substituted in) 66'
MF	8	Líber Vespa		(substituted in) 78'
Manager:
Víctor Púa

GK	1	José Cevallos
DF	3	Iván Hurtado
DF	5	Alberto Montaño
DF	21	Hólger Quiñónez	(yellow card) 85'
DF	6	Ulises de la Cruz
MF	17	Fricson George		(substituted off) 66'
MF	8	Jimmy Blandón
MF	16	Héctor Carabalí	(yellow card) 21'	(substituted off) 61'
MF	10	Álex Aguinaga
FW	22	Iván Kaviedes
FW	9	Ariel Graziani		(substituted off) 65'
Substitutions:
MF	7	Luis Moreira		(substituted in) 66'
FW	13	Agustín Delgado		(substituted in) 65'
MF	19	Jairon Zamora	(yellow card) 70'	(substituted in) 61'
Manager:
Carlos Sevilla

=== Argentina v Colombia ===
In this match Martín Palermo missed 3 penalties, one was saved by Miguel Calero. Colombia were also awarded two penalties, they scored one and missed one. So from a total of 5 penalties in this game, 4 were missed.

4 July 1999
17:05

Argentina	0–3	Colombia
	Report	Córdoba 10' (pen.); Congo 79'; Montaño 87'

Estadio Feliciano Cáceres, Luque
Attendance: 15,000
Referee: Ubaldo Aquino (Paraguay)

Argentina	Colombia

GK	1	Germán Burgos
DF	13	Nelson Vivas	(yellow card) 39'	(substituted off) 61'
DF	2	Roberto Ayala
DF	6	Walter Samuel
DF	3	Juan Pablo Sorín		(substituted off) 46'
MF	8	Javier Zanetti	(red card) 69'
MF	5	Diego Simeone
MF	22	Juan Román Riquelme
MF	7	Guillermo Barros Schelotto		(substituted off) 68'
FW	9	Martín Palermo
FW	21	Kily González
Substitutions:
MF	18	Diego Cagna		(substituted in) 46'
DF	4	Hugo Ibarra		(substituted in) 61'
DF	16	Andrés Guglielminpietro		(substituted in) 68'
Manager:
Marcelo Bielsa

GK	1	Miguel Calero	(yellow card) 84'
DF	4	Alexander Viveros
DF	5	Jorge Bermúdez
DF	2	Iván Córdoba
MF	18	Rubiel Quintana	(yellow card) 74'
MF	13	Jorge Bolaño
MF	20	Freddy Grisales
MF	8	Harold Lozano
MF	14	Arley Betancourth		(substituted off) 55'
FW	19	Hámilton Ricard	(yellow card) 38'	(substituted off) 77'
FW	9	Víctor Bonilla		(substituted off) 66'
Substitutions:
FW	17	Johnnier Montaño		(substituted in) 55'
FW	11	Henry Zambrano		(substituted in) 66'
FW	7	Edwin Congo		(substituted in) 77'
Manager:
Javier Álvarez Arteaga

=== Colombia v Ecuador ===
7 July 1999
19:05

Colombia	2–1	Ecuador
Morantes 37'; Ricard 39'	Report	Graziani 50'

Estadio Feliciano Cáceres, Luque
Attendance: 8,000
Referee: Masayoshi Okada (Japan)

Colombia	Ecuador

GK	12	René Higuita
DF	16	Jersson González
DF	15	Pedro Portocarrero
DF	3	Roberto Carlos Cortés
DF	21	Mario Yepes
MF	6	Juan Carlos Ramírez
MF	4	Alexander Viveros
MF	20	Freddy Grisales
MF	10	Neider Morantes	(substituted off) 68'
FW	11	Henry Zambrano	(substituted off) 60'
FW	19	Hámilton Ricard	(substituted off) 64'
Substitutions:
FW	17	Johnnier Montaño	(substituted in) 60'
FW	7	Edwin Congo	(substituted in) 64'
FW	9	Víctor Bonilla	(substituted in) 68'
Manager:
Javier Álvarez Arteaga

GK	1	José Cevallos
DF	3	Iván Hurtado
DF	4	Franklin Anangonó	(yellow card) 54'
DF	5	Alberto Montaño
DF	6	Ulises de la Cruz
DF	2	Dannes Coronel
MF	16	Héctor Carabalí		(substituted off) 46'
MF	10	Álex Aguinaga		(substituted off) 70'
MF	8	Jimmy Blandón
FW	9	Ariel Graziani
FW	22	Iván Kaviedes		(substituted off) 86'
Substitutions:
MF	14	Marlon Ayoví		(substituted in) 46'
MF	20	Wellington Sánchez		(substituted in) 70'
FW	11	Nicolás Asencio		(substituted in) 86'
Manager:
Carlos Sevilla

=== Argentina v Uruguay ===
7 July 1999
21:05

Argentina	2–0	Uruguay
Kily González 1'; Palermo 56'	Report

Estadio Feliciano Cáceres, Luque
Attendance: 8,000
Referee: Gilberto Hidalgo (Peru)

Argentina	Uruguay

GK	1	Germán Burgos
DF	13	Nelson Vivas	(red card) 73'
DF	2	Roberto Ayala
DF	6	Walter Samuel
DF	3	Juan Pablo Sorín	(yellow card) 36'
MF	5	Diego Simeone
MF	18	Diego Cagna		(substituted off) 85'
MF	22	Juan Román Riquelme
MF	21	Kily González
MF	7	Guillermo Barros Schelotto		(substituted off) 76'
FW	9	Martín Palermo	(yellow card) 35'	(substituted off) 78'
Substitutions:
DF	14	Mauricio Pochettino		(substituted in) 76'
MF	11	Gustavo López		(substituted in) 78'
MF	17	Claudio Husaín		(substituted in) 85'
Manager:
Marcelo Bielsa

GK	1	Fabián Carini
DF	17	Martín del Campo
DF	14	Alejandro Lembo
DF	3	Fernando Picun
DF	22	Federico Bergara		(substituted off) 58'
MF	8	Líber Vespa
MF	5	Andrés Fleurquin		(substituted off) 46'
MF	7	Fabián Coelho	(yellow card) 37'
FW	10	Federico Magallanes
FW	11	Gabriel Álvez		(substituted off) 46'
FW	9	Marcelo Zalayeta
Substitutions:
MF	6	Gianni Guigou		(substituted in) 46'
FW	21	Antonio Pacheco		(substituted in) 46'
MF	16	Marcelo Romero		(substituted in) 58'
Manager:
Víctor Púa
