= 1998 Copa Libertadores finals =

- Event: 1998 Copa Toyota Libertadores
Vasco da Gama	Barcelona
(Brazil)	(Ecuador)
4	1
- on aggregate

First leg
Vasco da Gama	Barcelona
2	0
- Date: 12 August 1998
- Venue: São Januário, Rio de Janeiro
- Referee: Gustavo Méndez
- Attendance: 35,000

Second leg
Barcelona	Vasco da Gama
1	2
- Date: 26 August 1998
- Venue: Monumental Isidro Romero, Guayaquil
- Referee: Javier Castrilli
- Attendance: 72,000

The 1998 Copa Libertadores final was a two-legged football match-up to determine the 1998 Copa Libertadores champion. It was contested by Brazilian club Vasco da Gama and Ecuadorian club Barcelona. The first leg was played on August 12 at Estádio São Januário in Rio de Janeiro, with the second leg played on August 26 at Estadio Monumental in Guayaquil.

== Qualified teams ==
Team	Previous finals appearances (bold indicates winners)
(Brazil) Vasco da Gama	None
(Ecuador) Barcelona	1990

== Venues ==
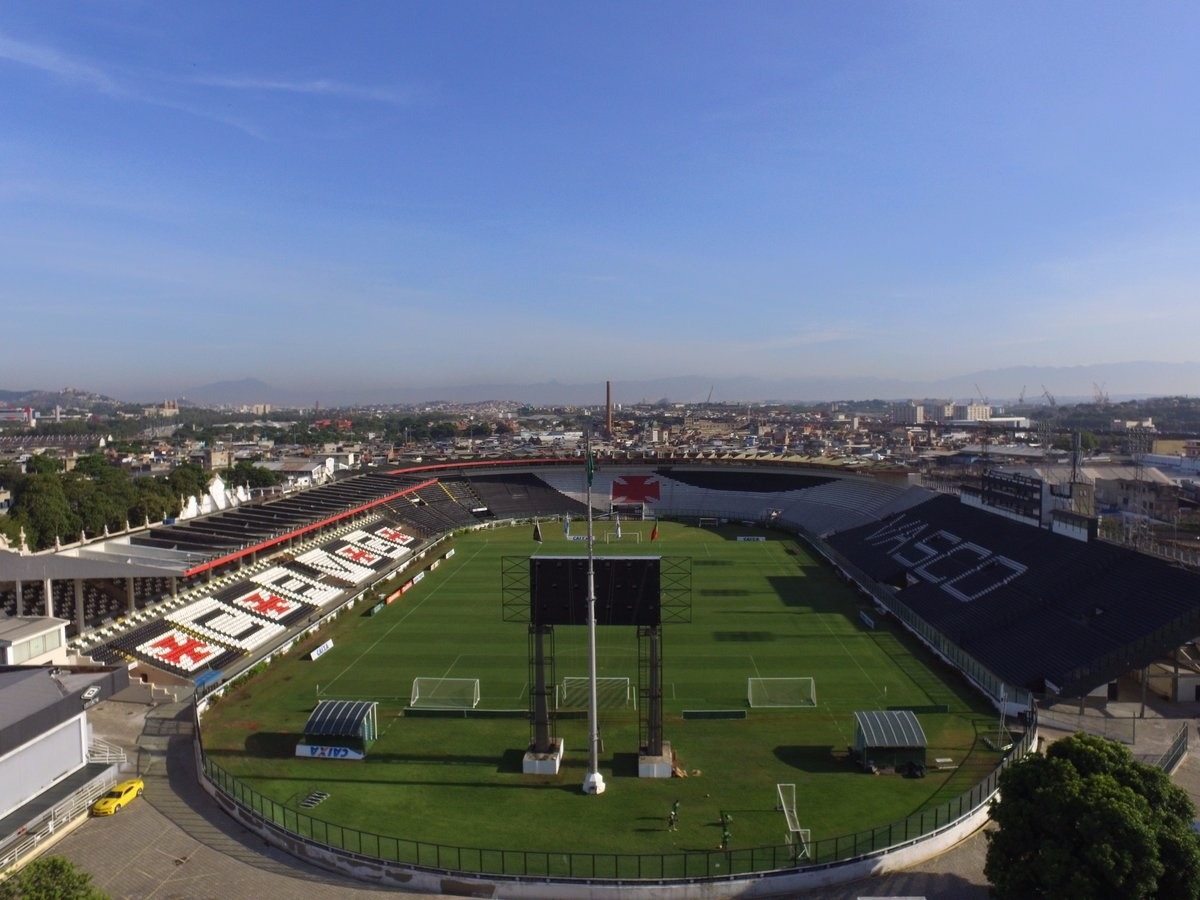
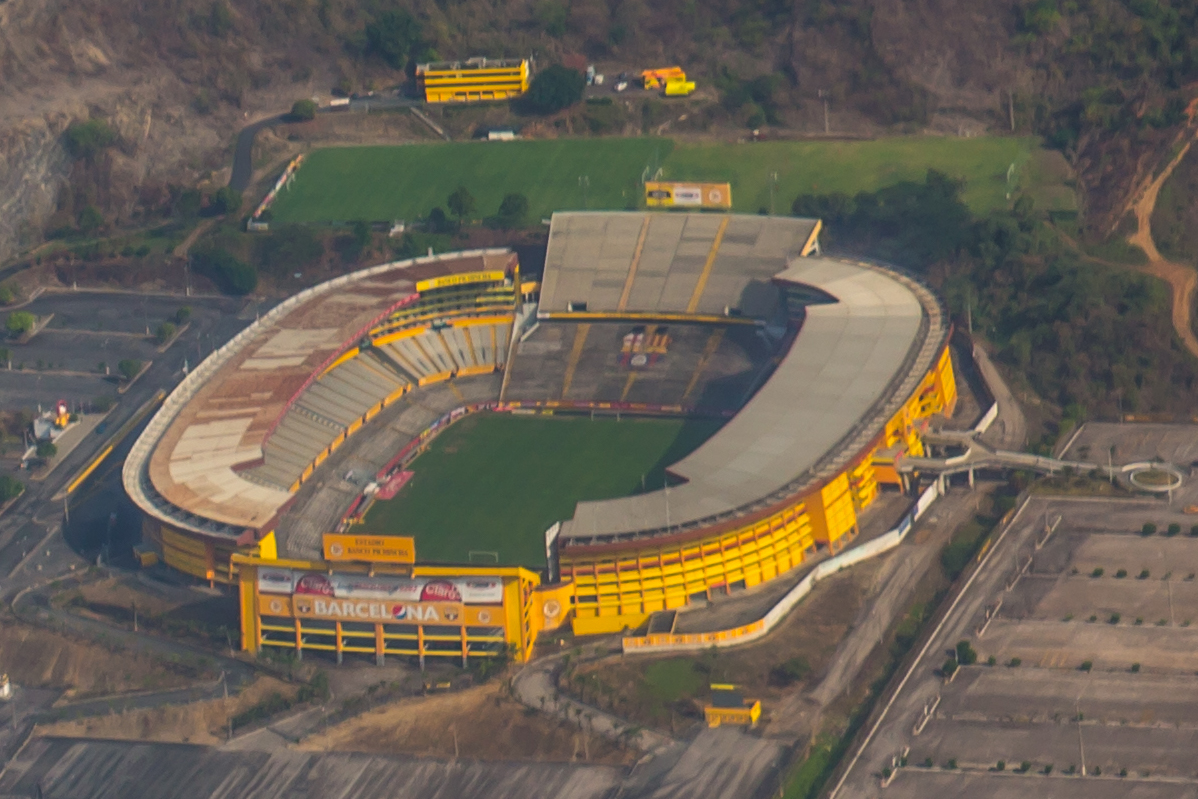
Estadio São Januário (left) and Estadio Monumental Isidro Romero, venues for the series

== Route to the finals ==
Barcelona			Vasco da Gama	
(Chile) Colo-Colo; H **2–1**	Delgado 45'; Morales 87' (pen.)	**Round of 16**; First leg	(Brazil) Cruzeiro; H **2–1**	Luizão 27'; Donizete 56'
(Chile) Colo-Colo; A **2–2**	Delgado 45', 54'	Second leg	(Brazil) Cruzeiro; A **0–0**	
(Bolivia) Bolívar; A **1–1**	Delgado 80'	**Quarterfinals**; First leg	(Brazil) Grêmio; A **1–1**	Pedrinho 46'
(Bolivia) Bolívar; H **4–0**	Asencio 10', 74'; Gómez 33'; Rosero 52'	Second leg	(Brazil) Grêmio; H **1–0**	Pedrinho 39'
(Paraguay) Cerro Porteño; H **1–0**	de Avila 11'	**Semifinals**; First leg	(Argentina) River Plate; H **1–0**	Donizete 10'
(Paraguay) Cerro Porteño; A **1–2** (p. 4–3)	Asencio 72'	Second leg	(Argentina) River Plate; A **1–1**	Juninho 82'

== Matches ==
=== First leg ===
12 August 1998
21:40 (UTC-3)

Vasco da Gama (Brazil)	2–0	(Ecuador) Barcelona
Donizete 7'; Luizão 35'	(Report)

São Januário, Rio de Janeiro
Attendance: 35,000
Referee: Gustavo Méndez (Uruguay)

**Vasco**	**Barcelona**

GK	1	(Brazil) Carlos Germano
DF	10	(Brazil) Vágner
DF	3	(Brazil) Odvan	(yellow card) 6'
DF	4	(Brazil) Mauro Galvão (c)
DF	5	(Brazil) Luisinho
MF	6	(Brazil) Felipe
MF	8	(Brazil) Nasa		(substituted off) 66'
MF	19	(Brazil) Juninho		(substituted off) 82'
MF	16	(Brazil) Pedrinho		(substituted off) 66'
FW	9	(Brazil) Luizão	(yellow card) 24'
FW	7	(Brazil) Donizete
Substitutes:
GK	12	(Brazil) Márcio Cazorla
	2	(Brazil) Vítor		(substituted on) 66'
MF	15	(Brazil) Alex		(substituted on) 66'
	18	(Brazil) Válber		(substituted on) 82'
	11	(Brazil) Ramon
	21	(Brazil) Mauricinho
	22	(Brazil) Sorato
Manager:
(Brazil) Antônio Lopes

GK	1	(Ecuador) José Francisco Cevallos	(yellow card) 63'
DF	2	(Ecuador) Luis Gómez		(substituted off) 35'
DF	24	(Ecuador) Holger Quiñonez
DF	3	(Ecuador) Jimmy Montanero (c)
DF	6	(Ecuador) Luis Capurro
MF	25	(Ecuador) Roberto Macias		(substituted off) 55'
MF	16	(Ecuador) Julio Rosero		(substituted off) 45'
MF	8	(Ecuador) Marcelo Morales	(yellow card) 9'
MF	15	(Ecuador) Washington Aires
FW	26	(Colombia) Antony de Ávila
FW	11	(Ecuador) Nicolas Asencio
Substitutes:
GK	12	(Ecuador) Emilio Valencia
	23	(Ecuador) Wagner Rivera		(substituted on) 35'
DF	18	(Ecuador) Raúl Noriega
DF	17	(Ecuador) Fricson George		(substituted on) 55'
MF	5	(Ecuador) Héctor Carabalí		(substituted on) 45'
	10	(Ecuador) Angel Sotelo
	7	(Ecuador) Carlos Yanes
Manager:
(Argentina) Rubén Darío Insúa

Assistant referees:
(Uruguay) Carlos Velázquez
(Uruguay) Jorge Galatti
Fourth official:

=== Second leg ===
26 August 1998
20:10 (UTC-5)

Barcelona (Ecuador)	1–2	(Brazil) Vasco da Gama
de Avila 79'	(Report)	Luizão 24'; Donizete 45'

Monumental Isidro Romero, Guayaquil
Attendance: 72,000
Referee: Javier Castrilli (Argentina)

**Barcelona**	**Vasco**

BARCELONA:
GK	1	(Ecuador) José Francisco Cevallos
DF	2	(Ecuador) Luis Gómez	(yellow card) 40'
DF	18	(Ecuador) Raúl Noriega		(substituted off) 46'
DF	3	(Ecuador) Holger Quiñonez	(yellow card) 90'
DF	24	(Ecuador) Jimmy Montanero (c)	(yellow card) 67'
DF	17	(Ecuador) Fricson George
MF	5	(Ecuador) Héctor Carabalí	(yellow card) 78'
MF	8	(Ecuador) Marcelo Morales
MF	26	(Colombia) Antony de Ávila	(yellow card) 25'
FW	13	(Ecuador) Agustin Delgado	(yellow card) 91'
FW	11	(Ecuador) Nicolas Asencio
Substitutes:
GK	12	(Ecuador) Emilio Valencia
	4	(Ecuador) Alberto Montaño
DF	6	(Ecuador) Luis Capurro
	7	(Ecuador) Carlos Yanes
MF	15	(Ecuador) Washington Aires		(substituted on) 46'
MF	16	(Ecuador) Julio Rosero
	23	(Ecuador) Wagner Rivera
Manager:
(Argentina) Rubén Darío Insúa

VASCO DA GAMA:
GK	1	(Brazil) Carlos Germano	(yellow card) 70'
DF	10	(Brazil) Vágner
DF	3	(Brazil) Odvan	(yellow card) 10'
DF	4	(Brazil) Mauro Galvão (c)
DF	6	(Brazil) Felipe	(yellow card) 95'
MF	5	(Brazil) Luisinho		(substituted off) 87'
MF	8	(Brazil) Nasa
MF	19	(Brazil) Juninho	(yellow card) 55'
MF	16	(Brazil) Pedrinho		(substituted off) 74'
FW	7	(Brazil) Donizete	(red card) 93'
FW	9	(Brazil) Luizão		(substituted off) 82'
Substitutes:
GK	12	(Brazil) Márcio
DF	2	(Brazil) Vítor		(substituted on) 87'
DF	15	(Brazil) Alex Pinho		(substituted on) 82'
DF	18	(Brazil) Válber
MF	11	(Brazil) Ramon	(yellow card) 78'	(substituted on) 74'
MF	17	(Brazil) Nélson
FW	21	(Brazil) Mauricinho
Manager:
(Brazil) Antônio Lopes

Assistant referees:
(Argentina) Claudio Rossi
(Argentina) Jorge Rattalino
Fourth official:
(Argentina) Claudio Martin
