= Portocarrero =

Portocarrero is a surname. Notable people with the surname include:

- Anastasio Somoza Portocarrero (born 1951), Nicaraguan heir, colonel and businessman
- Claudia Portocarrero (born 1985), Peruvian cumbia dancer
- Hope Portocarrero (1929–1991), First Lady of Nicaragua
- Juan Portocarrero (died 1631), Spanish Roman Catholic prelate
- Luis Antonio Tomás de Portocarrero (1649–1723), Spanish noble and Viceroy of Catalonia
- Hermenegildo Portocarrero, Baron of Forte de Coimbra (1818–1893), Brazilian nobleman and military officer, marshal in the Brazilian Army
- Luisa Portocarrero (born 1976), Guatemalan artistic gymnast
- Martina Portocarrero (1949–2022), Peruvian folk singer, cultural researcher, politician
- Pedro Portocarrero (disambiguation):
  - Pedro Portocarrero (archbishop of Granada) (died 1526), Spanish Roman Catholic bishop
  - Pedro Portocarrero (bishop, died 1600), Spanish Roman Catholic bishop
  - Pedro Portocarrero (footballer) (born 1977), Colombian football player
- René Portocarrero (1912–1985), Cuban artist
