= Víctor Macías =

Ecuadorian footballer (born 1984)

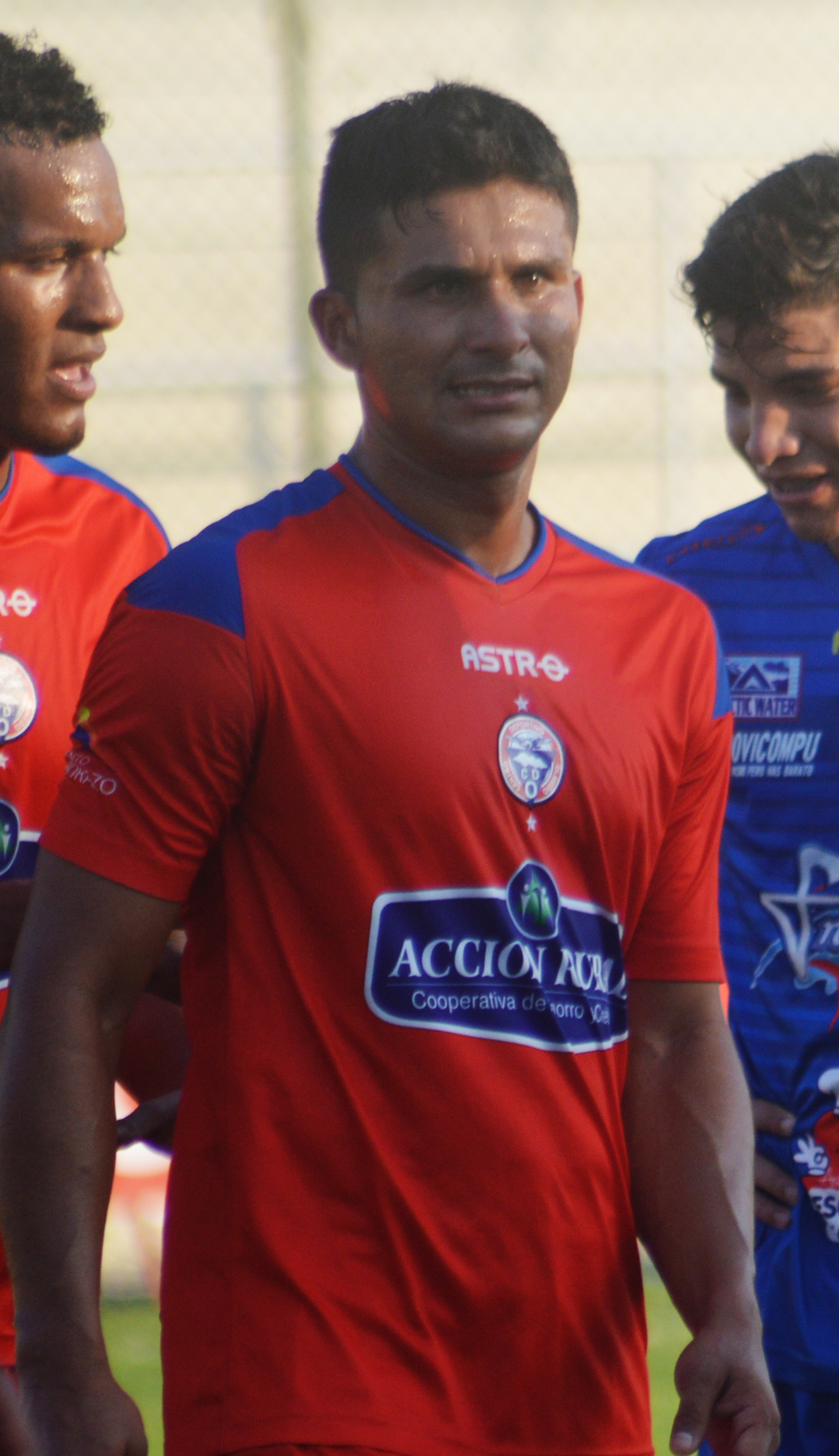
- Víctor Macías playing for Olmedo in 2015

Personal information
- Full name: Víctor Iván Macías García
- Date of birth: 1 July 1984 (age 42)
- Place of birth: Portoviejo, Ecuador
- Position: Forward

Senior career*
Years	Team	Apps	(Gls)
2003–2004	L.D.U. Quito	24	(2)
2005	L.D.U. Loja	1	(0)
2005–2006	L.D.U. Portoviejo	42	(11)
2006	Aucas	5	(0)
2007	Atlético Audaz	9	(2)
2008	Deportivo Quito	13	(0)
2009	Atlético Audaz	2	(0)
2009	Águilas	6	(2)
2010	ESPOLI	19	(0)
2011	L.D.U. Portoviejo	31	(2)
2013–2014	Mushuc Runa	46	(0)
2015	Olmedo	36	(1)
2016–2017	Clan Juvenil	21	(1)
- * Club domestic league appearances and goals as of 13 February 2018

Víctor Iván Macías García (born July 1, 1984) is an Ecuadorian footballer who most recently played for Clan Juvenil in the Ecuadorian Serie A.
