= Nicolás Asencio =

Ecuadorian footballer (born 1975)

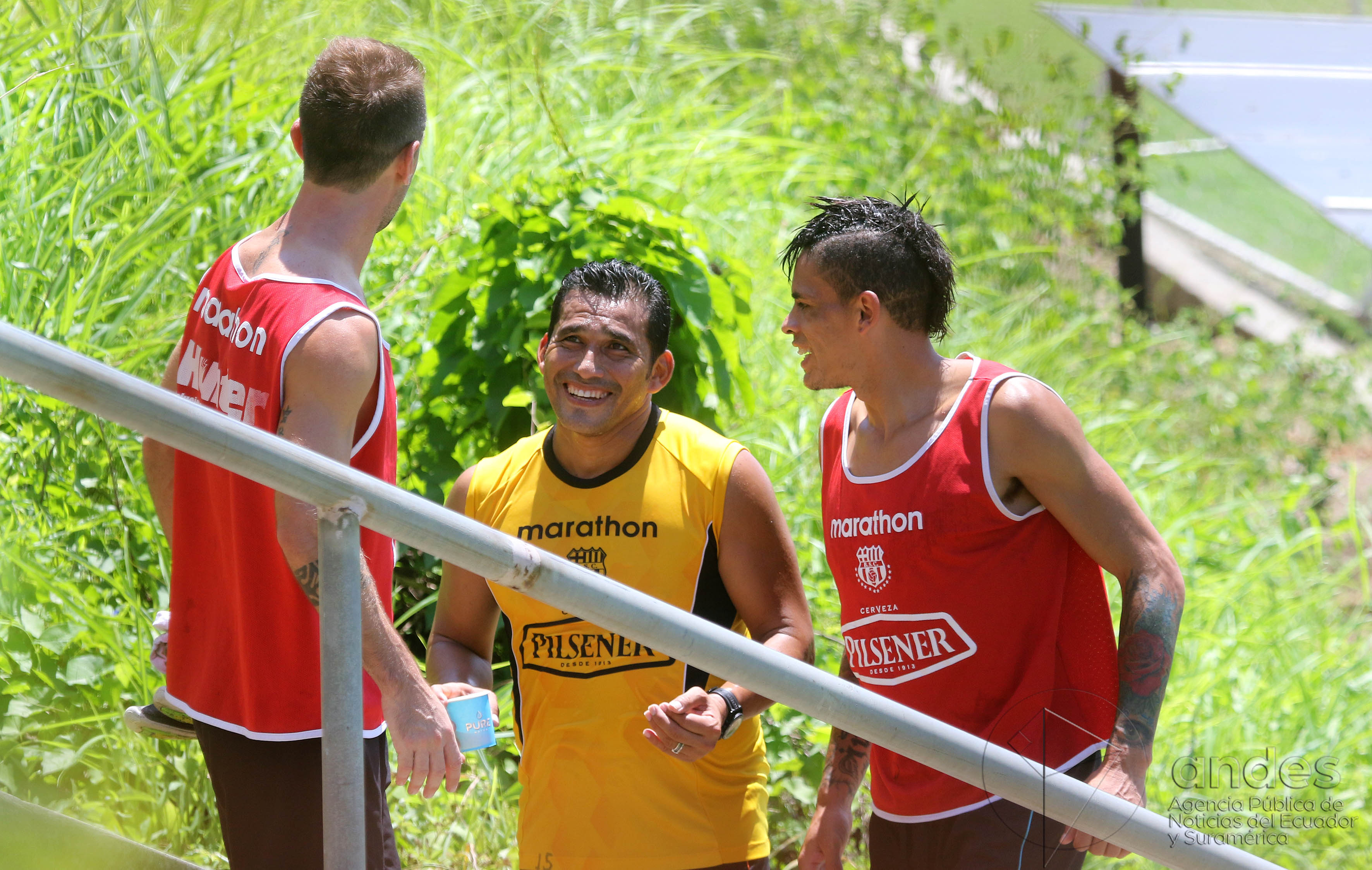
- Nicolás Asenico in-between two other football players

Personal information
- Full name: Nicolás Geovanny Asencio Espinoza
- Date of birth: April 26, 1975 (age 51)
- Place of birth: Machala, Ecuador
- Height: 1.75 m (5 ft 9 in)
- Position: Striker

Youth career
- LDU Machala
- 9 de Octubre

Senior career*
Years	Team	Apps	(Gls)
1992–1993	9 de Octubre	0	(0)
1993	→ Barcelona SC (loan)	5	(1)
1993–1998	Barcelona SC	93	(34)
1994	→ Calvi FC (loan)	0	(0)
1995	→ Aucas (loan)	37	(7)
1998–2002	Tecos UAG	15	(2)
1999–2000	→ Ferro Carril Oeste (loan)	19	(3)
2000	→ Barcelona SC (loan)	28	(4)
2001	→ Millonarios (loan)	14	(2)
2001–2002	→ Barcelona SC (loan)	100	(35)
2003	Tampico Madero	0	(0)
2003	→ Barcelona SC (loan)	7	(0)
2004	El Nacional	33	(1)
2005	Deportivo Cuenca	37	(3)
2006	Cobreloa	12	(2)
2006	Barcelona SC	24	(9)
2007	Jorge Wilstermann	17	(2)
2007	Barcelona SC	15	(3)
2008	Macará	24	(5)
2009	Deportivo Quito	7	(1)
2009–2010	Atlético Audaz	33	(5)
2011	Caribe Junior	–	(–)
2011	Espoli	18	(1)
2012	Abuelos FC	0	(0)
2012	Deportivo Grecia	6	(1)
2013	Anaconda FC	–	(–)
2015	ATV Piñas	–	(–)
2016	Toreros FC	–	(–)
Total		544	(121)

International career
1995–2003	Ecuador	20	(0)
- * Club domestic league appearances and goals

Nicolás Geovanny Asencio Espinoza (born April 26, 1975) is an Ecuadorian former professional footballer who played as a striker.

He played for several clubs, including his beloved Barcelona de Guayaquil. In Ecuador he also played for Aucas, El Nacional, Deportivo Cuenca, Macará and Deportivo Quito, in Mexico for Tecos UAG, in Colombia for Millonarios, in Chile for Cobreloa and also in Bolivia for Wilstermann.

== International career ==
Asencio played for the Ecuador national team between 1995 and 2003 earning a total of 20 caps including one in the 2002 FIFA World Cup.

== After football ==
After his retirement, Asencio worked as sporting director for Barcelona SC until 2021. Next, he joined Guayaquil Sport with the same charge.

== Honours ==
Barcelona Sporting

- Ecuadorian Serie A: 1997

Deportivo Quito

- Ecuadorian Serie A: 2009

Ecuador

- Canada Cup: 1999
