= Jairon =

Jairon is a given name. It may refer to:

- Jairon Zamora (born 1978), Ecuadorian football midfielder
- Jairon (footballer) (born 1981), Jairon Feliciano Damásio, Brazilian football forward

== See also ==
- Jairo
