= Luis Moreira =

Ecuadorian footballer (born 1978)

Personal information
- Full name: Luis Hebertson Moreira Ibarra
- Date of birth: September 23, 1978 (age 48)
- Place of birth: Portoviejo, Ecuador
- Height: 1.73 m (5 ft 8 in)
- Positions: Attacking midfielder; forward

Team information
- Current team: Deportivo Quito

Senior career*
Years	Team	Apps	(Gls)
1996–2001	Emelec		
2001	Santa Rita Vinces	10	(0)
2002	Emelec	14	(0)
2003	Deportivo Cuenca	25	(1)
2004	Audaz Octubrino	10	(0)
2004–2005	El Nacional	19	(1)
2005	Delfin	9	(0)
2006	LDU Loja		
2007	Delfin	11	(6)
2007	Deportivo Azogues	15	(3)
2008	Deportivo Quito	11	(0)
2009	Deportivo Azogues		
2010	Rocafuerte		
2011	Huaquillas		
2011	Atlético Audaz	7	(2)

International career^{‡}
1999	Ecuador	6	(0)
- * Club domestic league appearances and goals as of 31 December 2011 ‡ National team caps and goals as of 1 January 2008

Luis Hebertson Moreira Ibarra (born September 23, 1978) is an Ecuadorian retired football midfielder. He has played for a number of clubs in Ecuador.

== Honours ==
=== International ===
- Ecuador
  - Canada Cup: 1999
