= 1995 Canada Cup =

Maple Cup

Tournament details
- Host country: Canada
- Dates: May 22–28
- Teams: 3 (from 3 confederations)
- Venue(s): Commonwealth Stadium; Edmonton, Alberta

Final positions
- Champions: Chile
- Runners-up: Canada
- Third place: Northern Ireland

Tournament statistics
- Matches played: 3
- Goals scored: 8 (2.67 per match)
- Top scorer: (Canada) Paul Peschisolido (3)

The Canada Cup (a.k.a. Maple Cup) of 1995 was an international football (soccer) tournament, played at the Commonwealth Stadium in Edmonton, Alberta, Canada from May 22, 1995 to May 28, 1995.

== Final table ==
Team	Pld	W	D	L	GF	GA	GD	Pts
Chile	2	2	0	0	4	2	+2	6
Canada	2	1	0	1	3	2	+1	3
Northern Ireland	2	0	0	2	1	4	-3	0

== Results ==
May 22, 1995

Canada	2–0	Northern Ireland
Peschisolido 9', 23'

Commonwealth Stadium, Edmonton
Attendance: 12,112
Referee: Brian Hall (USA)

May 25, 1995

Chile	2–1	Northern Ireland
Valencia 74'; Mardones 81'		Dowie 6'

Commonwealth Stadium, Edmonton
Attendance: 6,124
Referee: Mike Seifert (CAN)

May 28, 1995

Canada	1–2	Chile
Peschisolido 13'		Valencia 32'; Salas 87'

Commonwealth Stadium, Edmonton
Attendance: 17,047
Referee: Tim Weyland (USA)
