= Franklin Anangonó =

Ecuadorian footballer (1974–2022)

Personal information
- Full name: Franklin Estebán Anangonó Tadeo
- Date of birth: 12 December 1974
- Place of birth: Quito, Ecuador
- Date of death: 13 June 2022 (aged 47)
- Position: Defender

Senior career*
Years	Team	Apps	(Gls)
1992–1994	ESPOLI		
1995–1998	El Nacional		
1998–1999	CF Cuautitlan		
1999	El Nacional	3	(0)
2000	Técnico Universitario	18	(0)
2001	Macará	32	(0)
2002–2004	El Nacional	94	(4)
2005	Técnico Universitario	17	(0)

International career
1999	Ecuador	7	(0)

Managerial career
- LDU Quito (youth)
- 2015–2016: Aucas (youth)
- 2016: Aucas (interim)
- 2017: Alianza Cotopaxi
- 2018: Atlético Salcedo
- * Club domestic league appearances and goals

Franklin Estebán Anangonó Tadeo (12 December 1974 – 13 June 2022) was an Ecuadorian football player and manager who played as a defender. He obtained seven international caps for the Ecuador national team in 1999.

== Honors ==
Ecuador

- Canada Cup: 1999
