= Dannes Coronel =

Ecuadorian footballer (1973–2020)

Personal information
- Full name: Dannes Arcenio Coronel Campoverde
- Date of birth: May 24, 1973
- Place of birth: Naranjal, Ecuador
- Date of death: July 7, 2020 (aged 47)
- Place of death: Naranjal Canton, Guayas, Ecuador
- Height: 1.57 m (5 ft 2 in)
- Position: Rightback

Senior career*
Years	Team	Apps	(Gls)
1990–1999	Emelec	301	(6)
2000–2002	El Nacional	101	(0)
2003	Deportivo Cuenca	5	(0)
2004	Barcelona	15	(0)
2005	Macará	15	(0)

International career
1992–2000	Ecuador	27	(0)
- * Club domestic league appearances and goals

Dannes Arcenio Coronel Campoverde (May 24, 1973 – July 7, 2020) was an Ecuadorian football defender.

== Club career ==
Nicknamed el Patucho, Coronel played for several clubs in his native country, including over 300 games for giants Emelec as well as for El Nacional and Barcelona.

== International career ==
A strong and speedy rightback, Coronel made 27 appearances for the Ecuador national team between 1992 and 2000.

== Personal life ==
After retiring as a player in 2005, he worked on his farm in Naranjal Canton.

=== Death ===
Coronel suffered a heart attack on July 7, 2020 and died on the same day, at the age of 47 in the Naranjal Canton, Guayas.

== Honors ==
=== Club ===
- Emelec
  - Serie A de Ecuador: 1993, 1994

=== Nation ===
- Ecuador
  - Canada Cup: 1999
