= Iván Hurtado =

Ecuadorian footballer (born 1974)

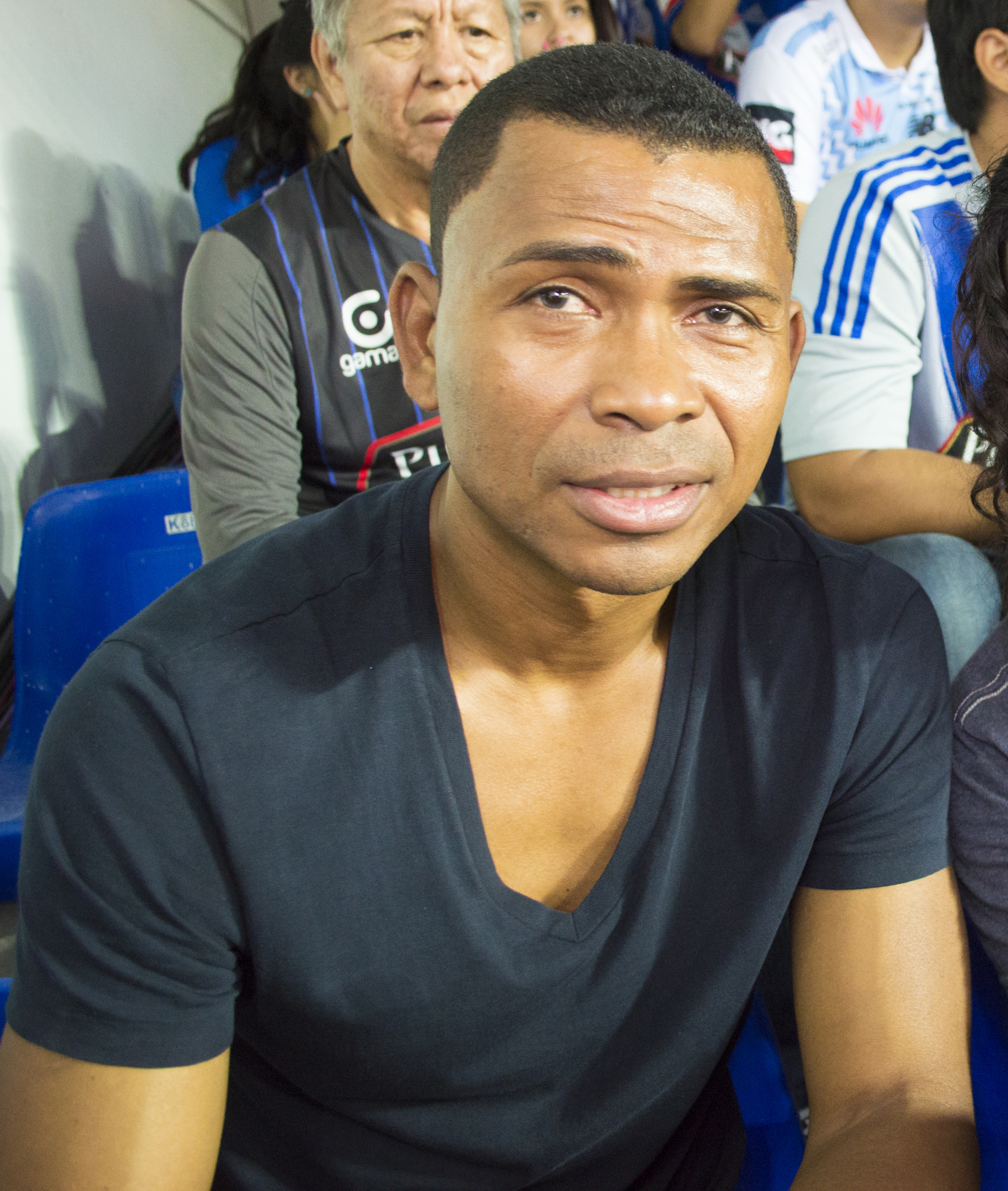
- Hurtado in 2017

Personal information
- Full name: Iván Jacinto Hurtado Angulo
- Date of birth: 16 August 1974 (age 52)
- Place of birth: Esmeraldas, Ecuador
- Height: 1.80 m (5 ft 11 in)
- Positions: Centre back; sweeper

Senior career*
Years	Team	Apps	(Gls)
1992–1996	Emelec	102	(10)
1996–1999	Celaya	89	(2)
1999–2001	Tigres	79	(0)
2001	Emelec	14	(1)
2001–2002	Querétaro	18	(0)
2002–2004	Barcelona SC	57	(2)
2004	Murcia	15	(0)
2004–2005	Pachuca	26	(0)
2005–2006	Al Arabi	13	(3)
2006	Al-Ahly	0	(0)
2007	Atlético Nacional	38	(1)
2008	Barcelona SC	17	(0)
2008–2009	Millonarios	26	(2)
2009–2010	Deportivo Quito	49	(0)
2011	Barcelona SC	41	(0)
2012	Grecia	11	(1)
2015	Deportivo Echeandía		
Total		595	(22)

International career
1992–2014	Ecuador	168	(5)
- * Club domestic league appearances and goals

Iván Hurtado

Member of the National Assembly for the National Constituency
- Incumbent
- Assumed office 14 May 2013

Personal details
- Party: PAIS Alliance

Iván Jacinto Hurtado Angulo (born 16 August 1974) is an Ecuadorian politician and former professional footballer who played as a centre back.

Hurtado participated at six Copa Américas and two FIFA World Cups. With 168 international appearances for Ecuador between 1992 and 2014, he is considered one of the best Ecuadorian players of all time and was the most capped South American male footballer until Lionel Messi overtook him during the 2022 FIFA World Cup. He is also the 17th-most-capped male international footballer.

In 2013, Hurtado entered politics and was elected to the National Assembly for the PAIS Alliance.

== Club career ==
Hurtado started his career with the small club of his hometown, Esmeraldas Petrolero, at the age of 16. A year later he moved on to one of Ecuador's biggest clubs in Guayaquil, Emelec, and had two stellar seasons, including two championships with the club, in one of them he scored the championship goal with a free kick he executed.

His excellent play warranted a switch to the Mexican leagues where he even further developed his defending techniques and his intelligent reading of the game. Ivan made a big impact in his first club, Celaya, where he led them to the Mexican league finals. He then moved to Tigres. He then moved on to the La Liga in Spain playing for Real Murcia. After a mostly successful spell with Pachuca in Primera División de México, he moved on to Al Arabi in the Qatari League, impressing many over there.

After the FIFA World Cup in Germany, where Hurtado shone, it was reported that high-profile clubs such as English Premier League's Wigan Athletic, and Spanish La Liga's Recreativo Huelva and Villarreal were highly interested in him. However, none of these rumors were accurate, and after spending six more months with Al Arabi, Hurtado moved to Colombia where he played for Atlético Nacional, he led the defence of the team, becoming captain in the back-to-back titles in 2007. In mid-2009, he returned to Deportivo Quito for the remainder of their season. In 2011, he returned to play for Barcelona SC for one year, then he finished his career with Grecia in 2012.

== International career ==
Hurtado made his senior international debut for the Ecuador national team on 24 May 1992 in a friendly against Guatemala at the Estadio Doroteo Guamuch Flores in Guatemala City; the game ended 1–1, with Hurtado conceding a penalty. At just 17 years and 285 days, he became the youngest player ever to play for Ecuador.

Hurtado was one of the key players who played a major role in securing a first-ever FIFA World Cup berth for Ecuador in 2002. Due to his performance in the tournament, he was appointed to succeed former Ecuadorian star Alex Aguinaga to be the captain of a new generation of an ever-improving Ecuador side.

His best performances came in Ecuador's dream tournament in the 2006 FIFA World Cup. His defence left stars such as Polish forward Jacek Krzynowek, Costa Rican striker Paulo Wanchope, and English players Wayne Rooney, Joe Cole and Steven Gerrard desperate for goals. However, his form declined in the space of just six months. Nevertheless, he played for Ecuador at the 2007 Copa América, where his performance was very poor and criticised by many of his countrymen as the main reason for Ecuador's early elimination. Hurtado started the first two games against Chile and Mexico but was on the bench the whole game against Brazil.

Upon making his 143rd international appearance on 10 September 2007 in a friendly against El Salvador, Hurtado became the most-capped South American footballer of all time, surpassing Cafu's record of 142 caps for Brazil. Hurtado was also called up for the first two 2010 World Cup qualifiers against Venezuela and Brazil, miserably losing both matches. As a consequence, he along with teammate Ulises de la Cruz, was excluded from the squad for the next round against Paraguay. Hurtado announced that this would be his final qualifying campaign and possibly the World Cup should Ecuador qualify. He stated, "There are a crop of talented and personable youngsters coming through now, and they deserve to have their chance like I had mine."

Hurtado's record for most overall international caps by a South American player was surpassed by Lionel Messi in December 2022. Messi would also tie Hurtado's record for most appearances in World Cup qualifying games in September 2025.

== Playing style ==
Once a top class defender, with good technique and an ability to read the game, Hurtado is known in Spanish by his fans as "Bam Bam" for ramming the football with his feet like the Hanna-Barbera character does with his club. His playing style differs from his national partner, Giovanny Espinoza. While Espinoza is a very large player who uses his size, power and speed to overwhelm his adversary, Hurtado is considered to be very classy and often needs no contact at all to dispossess his adversary. Ivan also makes very clean tackles, organizes his back line as well as the best of them, and can even display confidence with the ball at his feet, and he can occasionally make surprising dashes forward.

Hurtado is a long and short passer who also takes free kicks. While his shots have less bend than those of some specialists, they are characterized by a level of force that can make them difficult for goalkeepers to anticipate and time.

== Political career ==
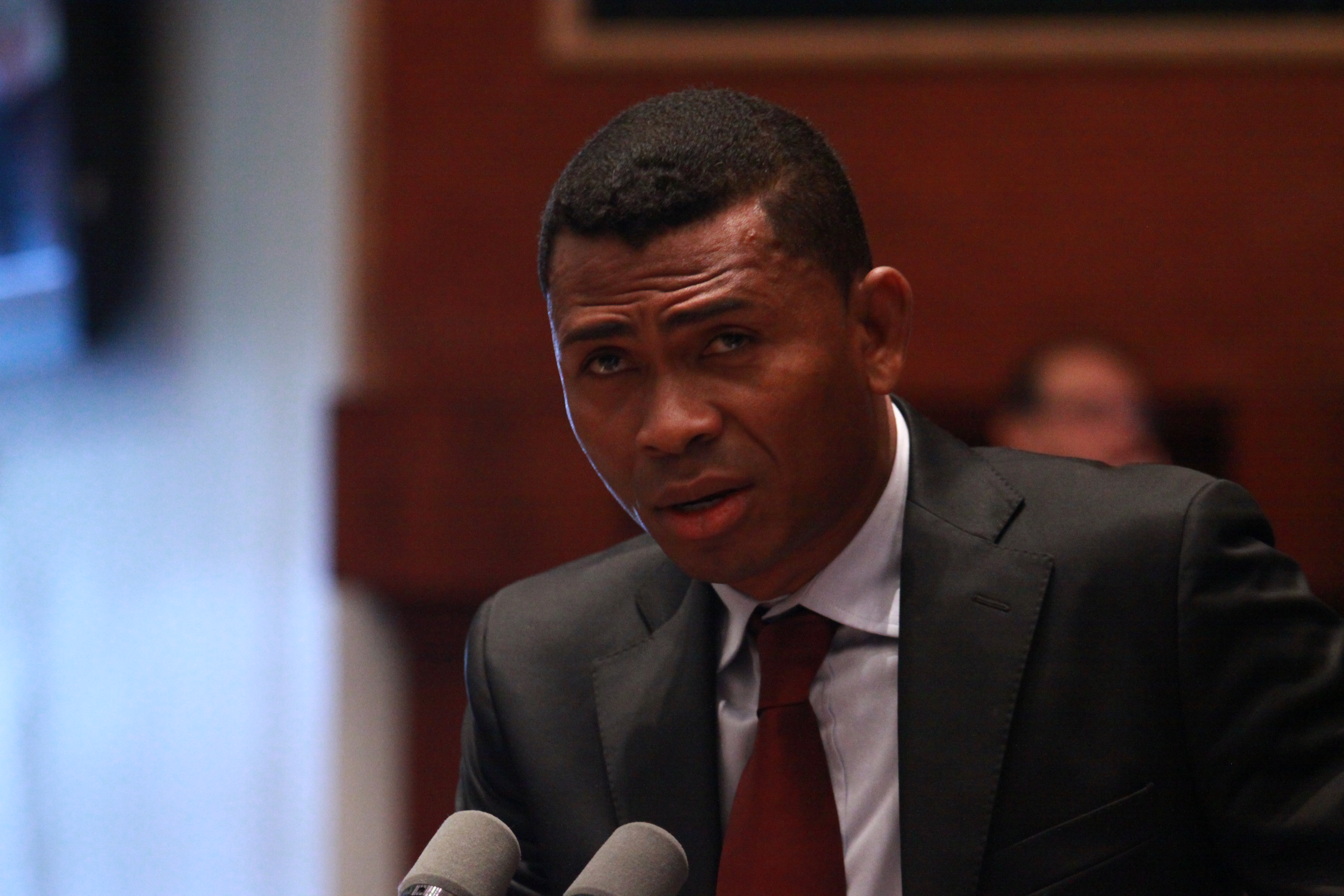
Hurtado in 2013

At the 2013 Ecuadorian general election, Hurtado was chosen as member of the National Assembly for the National Constituency. Hurtado serves as member of PAIS Alliance. Agustín Delgado and Ulises de la Cruz, former teammates of Hurtado at the national team, also serve for the PAIS Alliance in the National Assembly.

== Career statistics ==
Scores and results list Ecuador's goal tally first, score column indicates score after each Hurtado goal.

List of international goals scored by Iván Hurtado
No.	Date	Venue	Opponent	Score	Result	Competition
1	24 May 1992	?, Guatemala City, Guatemala	Guatemala		1–1	Friendly
2	24 May 1995	Athletic Recreation Park Stadium, Toyama City, Japan	Scotland		1–2	1995 Kirin Cup
3	7 June 1997	Estadio José Pachencho Romero, Maracaibo, Venezuela	Venezuela		1–1	1998 FIFA World Cup qualification
4	12 January 2002	Estadio Monumental Isidro Romero Carbo, Guayaquil, Ecuador	Guatemala		1–0	Friendly
5	9 February 2003	Estadio Monumental Isidro Romero Carbo, Guayaquil, Ecuador	Estonia		1–0	Friendly

== Honours ==
Emelec

- Ecuadorian Serie A: 1993, 1994

Atlético Nacional

- Primera A: 2007

Ecuador

- Canada Cup: 1999
- Korea Cup: 1995

== See also ==
- List of men's footballers with 100 or more international caps
