= Jimmy Blandón =

Ecuadorian footballer (born 1969)

Personal information
- Full name: Jimmy Roberto Blandón Quiñónez
- Date of birth: January 1, 1969 (age 57)
- Place of birth: Esmeraldas, Ecuador
- Height: 1.69 m (5 ft 7 in)
- Position: Midfielder

Senior career*
Years	Team	Apps	(Gls)
1992–1993	Santos El Guabo		
1994–1997	Deportivo Cuenca		
1998	Millonarios		
1999	Deportivo Cuenca	21	(3)
1999–2000	Blooming	18	(1)
2000–2001	Barcelona SC	32	(1)
2001	Santa Rita Vinces	30	(0)
2002	Barcelona SC	42	(0)
2003	Espoli	30	(5)
2004	Deportivo Cuenca	14	(0)
2005	Emelec	18	(0)
2005	Santa Rita Vinces	10	(0)
2006	5 de Agosto		

International career
1997–2000	Ecuador	30	(0)
- * Club domestic league appearances and goals

Jimmy Roberto Blandón Quiñónez (born January 1, 1969, in Esmeraldas) is a former Ecuadorian football midfielder. He played in 30 matches for Ecuador between 1997 and 2000. He was a strong defensive midfielder with great mobility and tireless physical condition.

Blandón has played club football in Ecuador for Barcelona SC, Emelec and Deportivo Cuenca, in Colombia for Millonarios, as well as for Bolivian side Blooming.

== Honours ==
=== Club ===
- Blooming
  - Liga de Fútbol Profesional Boliviano: 1999
- Deportivo Cuenca
  - Serie A de Ecuador: 2004

=== Nation ===
- Ecuador
  - Canada Cup: 1999
