= Pedro Portocarrero =

Pedro Portocarrero may refer to:

- Pedro Portocarrero (archbishop of Granada) (died 1526), Spanish Roman Catholic bishop
- Pedro Portocarrero (bishop, died 1600), Spanish Roman Catholic bishop
- Pedro Portocarrero (footballer) (born 1977), Colombian football player
