= Félix José Hernández =

Venezuelan footballer (born 1972)

Félix Hernández
Personal information
- Full name: Félix José Hernández
- Date of birth: April 18, 1972 (age 54)
- Place of birth: Venezuela
- Height: 1.82 m (5 ft 11 1/2 in)
- Position: Midfielder

Senior career*
Years	Team	Apps	(Gls)
?–1998	ItalChacao		
1998–1999	Atlético Celaya	28	(5)
1999–2001	ItalChacao		
2001–2002	Polideportivo Ejido	7	(0)
2002–2003	Nacional Táchira		
2004	ItalChacao		
2004–2006	Deportivo Anzoátegui		

International career
1996–1999	Venezuela	19	(0)
- * Club domestic league appearances and goals as of May 2009

Félix José Hernández (born 18 April 1972) is a Venezuelan former professional footballer who primarily played as a midfielder. Between 1996 and 1999, he made a total number of 19 appearances for the Venezuela national team, though he never scored for his country. He also played professionally in Mexico and Spain.
