= CD Grecia =

Association football club in Ecuador

Grecia
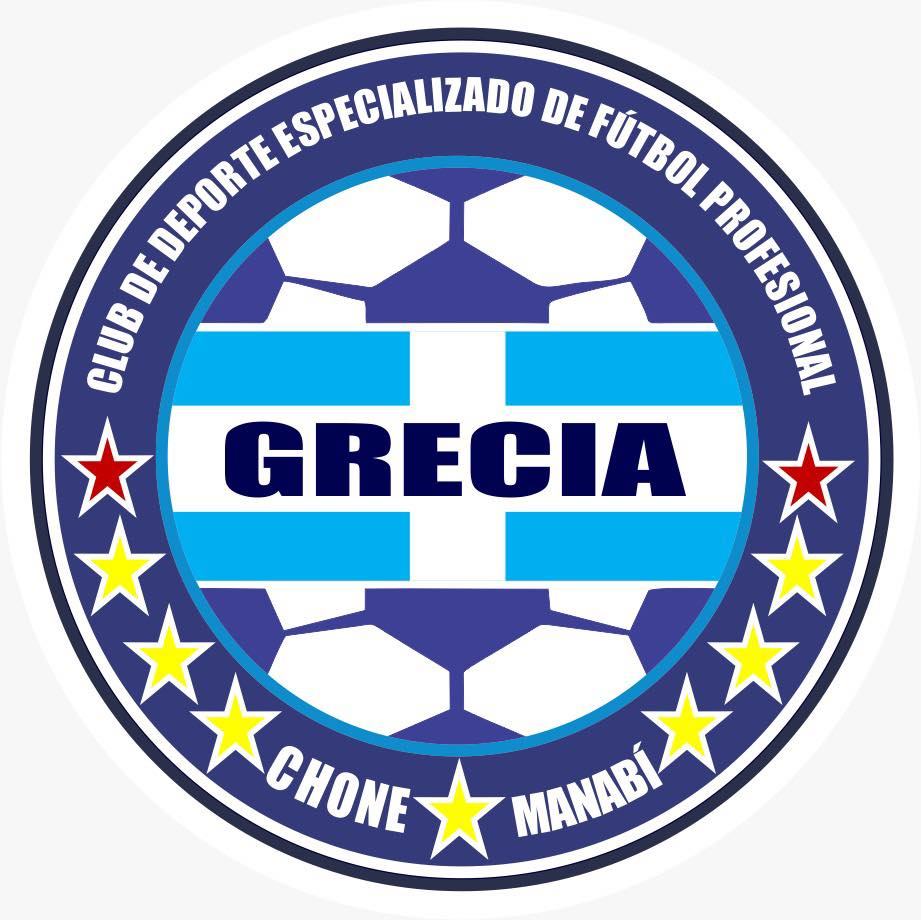
- Full name: Club Deportivo Especializado Dedicado a la Práctica del Deporte Profesional Grecia
- Founded: April 15, 1986; 39 years ago
- Ground: Estadio Los Chonanas
- Chairman: Fernando Moreira
- Manager: Ricardo Alcívar
- League: Serie B
Home colours	Away colours

Club Deportivo Grecia is a sports club based in Chone, Ecuador. They are best known for their professional football team.

== Notable former players ==
- (Ecuador) Robert Arboleda
- (Ecuador) Ivan Hurtado
- (Ecuador) Edwin Tenorio
