= José Duno =

Venezuelan footballer (born 1977)

Personal information
- Full name: José Ricardo Duno
- Date of birth: March 19, 1977 (age 49)
- Place of birth: San Félix, Venezuela
- Height: 1.79 m (5 ft 10 in)
- Position: Midfielder

Senior career*
Years	Team	Apps	(Gls)
1999–2000	Nueva Cadiz Cumana		
2000–2001	Deportivo Táchira		
2001–2003	Nacional Táchira		
2003–2007	Mineros de Guayana		
2007–	Deportivo Anzoátegui		

International career
1999–2000	Venezuela	12	(0)
- * Club domestic league appearances and goals as of May 2009

José Ricardo Duno (born 19 March 1977 in San Félix) is a Venezuelan football midfielder who made a total number of 12 appearances for the Venezuela national team between 1999 and 2000. He started his professional career at Nueva Cadiz Cumana.
