= José de Jesús Vera =

Venezuelan footballer and manager (born 1969)

Personal information
- Full name: José de Jesús Vera
- Date of birth: 9 February 1969 (age 57)
- Place of birth: Mérida, Venezuela
- Height: 1.83 m (6 ft 0 in)
- Position: Central midfielder

Senior career*
Years	Team	Apps	(Gls)
1998–2001	Estudiantes de Mérida	94	(1)
2002–2007	Maracaibo	120	(7)
2005–2006	→ Est. de Mérida (loan)	31	(0)

International career^{‡}
1999–2001	Venezuela	18	(0)

Managerial career
- 2008–2010: Estudiantes de Mérida
- 2010–2011: Zamora
- 2011–2012: Deportivo Táchira
- 2012–2013: Estudiantes de Mérida
- 2013: Deportivo Lara
- * Club domestic league appearances and goals as of 15 August 2012 ‡ National team caps and goals as of 8 June 2007

José de Jesús Vera (Spanish pronunciation: [xoˈse ˈβera], born 9 February 1969) is a retired Venezuelan professional footballer who played five seasons for Unión Atlético Maracaibo and was called–up by José Omar Pastoriza for play the 1999 Copa América celebrated in the country of Paraguay with his national team. He has that facts mentioned as one of his football career's most important moments.

== Managerial career ==
In 2008, Vera became a manager, starting with Estudiantes de Mérida, club in where he debuted as footballer for then arrive to Deportivo Táchira after of achieve the Primera División honour with Zamora during the Torneo de Clausura 2011. However, after a bad spell at one of two powerhouse clubs of his country, in January 2012, was replaced by Colombian coach Jaime de la Pava and then returned to his natal city Mérida. In 2017, Vera joined FC Dallas as Assistant Coach and Director of Scouting in August 2017, overseeing the club's identification and scouting of players around the world as well working with the first team on training and scouting of opposing teams.

== Honours ==
=== Player honours ===
Unión Atlético Maracaibo

- Primera División (1): 2004–05

=== Managerial honours ===
Zamora

- Torneo de Clausura (1): 2011
