= Julio César Rosero =

Ecuadorian footballer (born 1964)

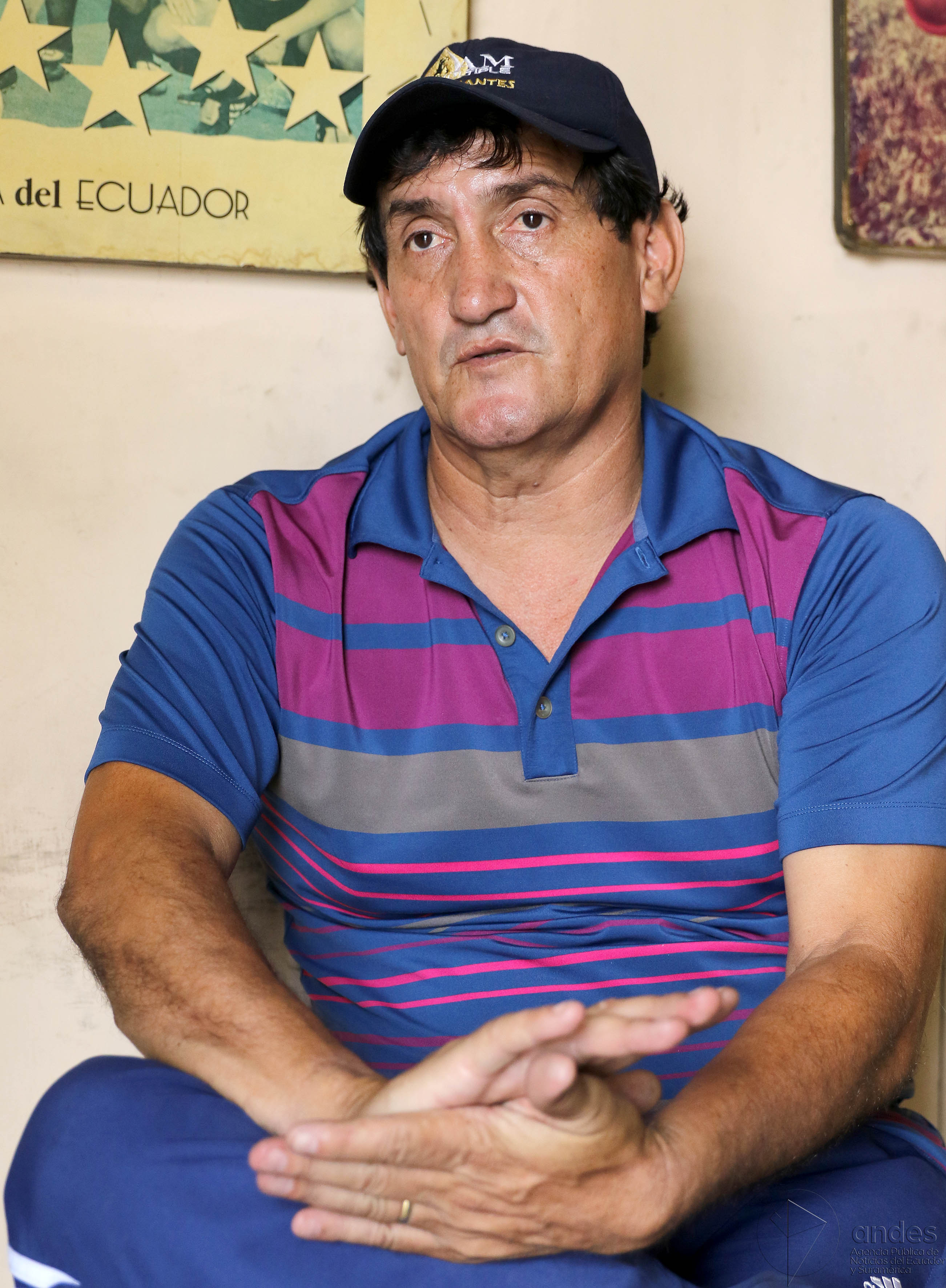

Personal information
- Date of birth: 11 June 1964 (age 62)
- Place of birth: Quito, Ecuador
- Position: Midfielder

International career
Years	Team	Apps	(Gls)
1989	Ecuador	11	(0)

Julio César Rosero (born 11 June 1964) is an Ecuadorian footballer who played as a midfielder. He played in eleven matches for the Ecuador national football team in 1989. He was also part of Ecuador's squad for the 1989 Copa América tournament.
