= Jairon Zamora =

Ecuadorian footballer (born 1978)

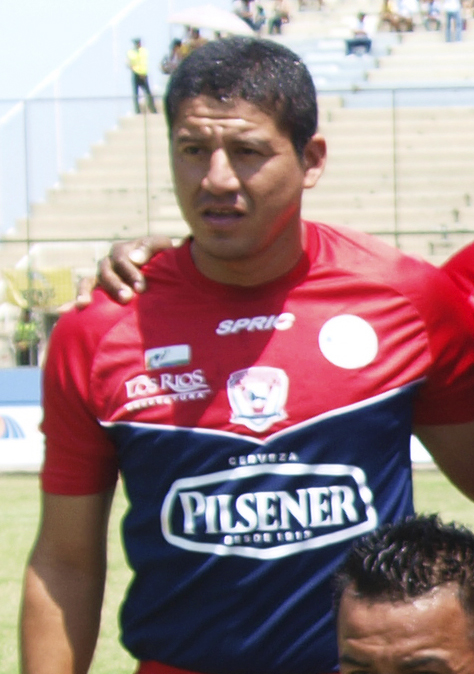
- Jairon Zamora in 2012.

Personal information
- Full name: Jairon Leonel Zamora Narváez
- Date of birth: 5 February 1978 (age 48)
- Place of birth: Guayaquil, Ecuador
- Height: 1.78 m (5 ft 10 in)
- Position: Midfielder

Team information
- Current team: Macará Ambato

Senior career*
Years	Team	Apps	(Gls)
1995	Emelec		
1996	Rocafuerte		
1996–2002	El Nacional		
2003	ESPOLI		
2004	Emelec		
2005	LDU Loja		
2006	Barcelona		
2007	Deportivo Azogues		
2008–2009	Macará Ambato		

International career
1999–2000	Ecuador	7	(0)
- * Club domestic league appearances and goals as of 16 November 2008

Jairon Leonel Zamora Narváez (born 5 February 1978 in Guayaquil) is an Ecuadorian football midfielder. He obtained a total number of seven international caps for the Ecuador national football team, making his debut in 1999.

== Honors ==
=== Nation ===
- Ecuador
  - Canada Cup: 1999
