= Wagner Rivera =

Ecuadorian footballer (born 1972)

Personal information
- Full name: Wagner Apolinario Rivera Cortázar
- Date of birth: September 18, 1972 (age 54)
- Place of birth: Quito, Ecuador
- Positions: Right back; centre back

Senior career*
Years	Team	Apps	(Gls)
1993–1996	Espoli	0	(0)
1996	Flamengo	15	(0)
1997–2006	Barcelona SC	0	(0)
2000	Santa Rita	0	(0)
2002	Santa Rita	0	(0)
2004	Audaz Octubrino	0	(0)
- * Club domestic league appearances and goals as of October 16, 2010 ‡ National team caps and goals as of October 16, 2010

Wagner Rivera (born September 18, 1972), is an Ecuadorean retired football player, playing right back and central back in the Club Deportivo Espoli.

== Club career ==
Wagner Rivera started playing for Espoli and then played for Flamengo beginning in 1996.

Rivera began his career playing defense with Espoli, a small club in Quito. At that time he stood out so he stayed until mid-season 1996 when he began to attract the interest of other clubs in Ecuador and abroad.

In 1996, the Flemish include Argentine Raçudo Mancuso. Rivera accepted the invitation to defend for Dearest Brazil. In Gavia, the Ecuadorian mission would be to form the central defense alongside names like Fabio and then Ronaldão.

Rivera played 15 games for Fla, all in 1996. The following year he returned to his home country, to defend the Barcelona of Guayaquil for three seasons. The team reached the semifinals of the Libertadores Cup in 1997.

Before ending his career in 2006 defending the same Guayaquil Barcelona, Rivera played for Octubrino Bold and Santa Rita, both Ecuadorian clubs.

=== Career statistics ===
(Correct as of October 16, 2010)

Club	Season	State League		Brazilian Série A		Copa do Brasil		Copa Libertadores		Copa Sudamericana		Total	
Club	Season	Apps	Goals	Apps	Goals	Apps	Goals	Apps	Goals	Apps	Goals	Apps	Goals
Flamengo	1996	-	-	15	0	-	-	-	-	-	-	15	0
Total		-	-	15	0	-	-	-	-	-	-	15	0

according to combined sources on the Flamengo official website and Flaestatística.

== Honours ==
  - Campeonato Equatoriano: 1997
