= Alex Pinho =

Brazilian footballer

Personal information
- Full name: Alex Sandro Pinho
- Date of birth: 2 March 1972 (age 54)
- Place of birth: São Gonçalo, Brazil
- Height: 1.83 m (6 ft 0 in)
- Position: Defender

Youth career
- 1985–1987: Mauá (São Gonçalo)
- 1988–1992: Vasco da Gama

Senior career*
Years	Team	Apps	(Gls)
1992–1999	Vasco da Gama	173	(1)
1999	→ Bahia (loan)		
2000	Náutico		
2000–2001	Santa Cruz		
2001–2002	Sport Recife		
2002–2004	Al Qadsiah		
2004	Paysandu		
2005	Santo André		
2005	Paysandu		
2006	America-RJ		
2007	Santa Cruz		
2008	Atlético Tubarão		
- * Club domestic league appearances and goals

Alex Sandro Pinho (born 2 March 1972), better known as Alex Pinho, is a Brazilian former professional footballer who played as a defender.

== Career ==
Revealed at Vasco da Gama, Alex Pinho participated in the club's achievements during the 1990s, with emphasis on the 1998 Copa Libertadores and the 1997 Brazilian Championship. In the 2000s, he played for football in Pernambuco, Al-Qadsiah in Saudi Arabia, and ended his career at Atlético Tubarão in 2008.

== Honours ==
Vasco da Gama

- Copa Libertadores: 1998
- Campeonato Brasileiro: 1997
- Torneio Rio-São Paulo: 1999
- Campeonato Carioca: 1992, 1993, 1994, 1998
- Taça Guanabara: 1992, 1994, 1998
- Taça Rio: 1992, 1993, 1999
- Copa São Paulo de Futebol Jr.: 1992
- Torneio João Havelange: 1993
