= Jimmy Montanero =

Ecuadorian footballer (born 1960)

Jimmy Montanero (born August 24, 1960) is a retired football player from Ecuador. He played as a soccer defender and he was nicknamed as "El Mormón".

== Club career ==
Montanero played all of his career for Barcelona Sporting Club from Guayaquil (1979–1999). With Barcelona he played in the Copa Libertadores finals twice (1990 & 1998) and reached various semi-finals. He was the captain of the team for almost two decades being respected and considered a player with much character.

== International ==
He earned seventeen caps for the Ecuador national team from 1989 to 1993.

== Personal life ==
Montanero is a member of the Church of Jesus Christ of Latter-day Saints and this is why he was widely known as "El Mormon" during his football career.
