= Rolando Álvarez =

Venezuelan footballer (born 1975)

Personal information
- Full name: Rolando Álvarez Suárez
- Date of birth: December 14, 1975 (age 50)
- Place of birth: Venezuela
- Position: Defender

Senior career*
Years	Team	Apps	(Gls)
1997–1999	Internacional de Lara		
1999–2002	Caracas FC		
2002–2003	Estudiantes Merida		
2003–2004	Trujillanos		
2004–2005	Deportivo Italia		
2005–2007	Zamora		
2008–	Trujillanos		

International career
1999–2001	Venezuela	20	(1)
- * Club domestic league appearances and goals as of May 2009

Rolando Álvarez Suárez (born 1975-12-14) is a Venezuelan football defender who made a total number of 20 appearances for the Venezuela national team between 1999 and 2001. He started his professional career at Internacional de Lara.

== International career ==
=== International goals ===
Scores and results list Venezuela's goal tally first.

Goal	Date	Venue	Opponent	Score	Result	Competition
1.	10 August 2000	Estadio Alejandro Morera Soto, Alajuela, Costa Rica	Costa Rica	5–1	5–1	Friendly
