= Juan Velásquez =

Peruvian footballer (1971–2021)

Personal information
- Full name: Juan José Velásquez Ojeda
- Date of birth: 20 March 1971
- Place of birth: Lima, Peru
- Date of death: 4 June 2021 (aged 50)
- Place of death: Lima, Peru
- Height: 1.84 m (6 ft 0 in)
- Position: Midfielder

Senior career*
Years	Team	Apps	(Gls)
- ULA
- Deportivo Galicia
- Deportivo Italia
- Deportivo Lara
1996–1997	La Loretana		
1998–1999	Deportivo Pesquero	59	(0)
2000	Alianza Atlético	38	(1)
2001	Sport Boys		
2003	Unión Huaral		
2004	Cienciano	9	(0)
2004	Coronel Bolognesi		

International career
1999–2000	Peru	6	(0)
- * Club domestic league appearances and goals

Juan José Velásquez Ojeda (20 March 1971 – 4 June 2021) was a Peruvian footballer who played as midfielder. He was the son of José Velásquez, a major figure in Peruvian football during the 1970s and 1980s.

== Club career ==
Velásquez played for a number of clubs in Peru, including Alianza Atlético and Sport Boys in the Peruvian First Division.

== International career ==
From 1999 to 2000, he also made six appearances for the senior Peru national football team.

== Death ==
Suffering from leukemia, Juan José Velásquez died in Lima on 4 June 2021 at the age of 50.
