= Carlos González (footballer, born 1976) =

Paraguayan footballer

Personal information
- Full name: Carlos Alberto González Fernández
- Date of birth: 30 March 1976 (age 50)
- Place of birth: Asunción, Paraguay
- Height: 1.70 m (5 ft 7 in)
- Position: Midfielder

Senior career*
Years	Team	Apps	(Gls)
1997–1999	Cerro Corá		
1999–2000	Municipal		
2000–2001	UE Lleida	24	(3)
2001	Cerro Corá		
2002	Guaraní		
2003	Libertad	6	(0)
2003	Cerro Corá		
2004–2006	Nacional	78	(12)
2006	The Strongest	11	(2)
2007	12 de Octubre	20	(4)
2007–2008	Tolima	23	(4)
2008–2009	Atlético Bucaramanga	12	(2)
2009–2010	Municipal	51	(17)
2011	Independiente CG	1	(0)

International career
1999–2005	Paraguay	8	(1)
- * Club domestic league appearances and goals

Carlos Alberto González Fernández (born 30 March 1976) is born in Asuncion, Paraguay. A former footballer who played as a midfielder. He was capped 8 times by the Paraguay national team. The last club he was independiente FBC was in Paraguay from January 1, 2011.
