= Alberto Montaño =

Ecuadorian footballer (born 1970)

Personal information
- Full name: Alberto Guillermo Montaño Angulo
- Date of birth: 23 March 1970 (age 56)
- Place of birth: Esmeraldas, Ecuador
- Height: 1.86 m (6 ft 1 in)
- Position: Defender

Youth career
- Esmeraldas Petrolero
- LDU Loja

Senior career*
Years	Team	Apps	(Gls)
1991–1993	Green Cross		
1994–2001	Barcelona SC	181	(9)
1998	→ Santiago Wanderers (loan)	15	(3)
2001	Delfín	15	(3)
2002	Deportivo Cuenca	26	(0)
2003	ESPOLI	31	(4)
2004	Deportivo Quito	14	(1)
2004–2005	Juventud Antoniana	25	(1)
2006–2007	Atlanta	16	(0)

International career
1992	Ecuador U23		
1992–2000	Ecuador	57	(3)
- * Club domestic league appearances and goals

Alberto Guillermo Montaño Angulo (born 23 March 1970) is a former Ecuadorian international football central defender.

== Club career ==
Montaño was born in Esmeraldas. He started his career with Green Cross before joining Barcelona SC in 1994. He was part of the Barcelona SC squad that reached the final of the Copa Libertadores in 1998.

Towards the end of his career he played for a number of teams in Ecuador before finishing his career in the lower leagues of Argentine football with Juventud Antoniana and then Atlanta and of Santiago Wanderers in Chile.

== International career ==
He played 57 times for the Ecuador national team. He also represented the under-23's in 1992.

== Honours ==
Ecuador

- Canada Cup: 1999
