= Arley Betancourth =

Colombian footballer (born 1975)

Personal information
- Full name: Arley Betancourth Velásquez
- Date of birth: 4 March 1975 (age 51)
- Place of birth: El Cerrito, Colombia
- Height: 1.83 m (6 ft 0 in)
- Position: Forward

Senior career*
Years	Team	Apps	(Gls)
1993–1999	Deportivo Cali		
1999–2000	Lanús		
2000–2001	América de Cali		
2001–2002	Lanús		
2002–2003	Maracaibo		
2004	Deportivo Pereira		
2004	Deportes Quindío		
2005	Universidad Catolica del Ecuador		

International career
1994–1999	Colombia	9	(0)
- * Club domestic league appearances and goals

Arley Betancourth (born 4 March 1975) is a Colombian former footballer who played as a forward. He made nine appearances for the Colombia national team from 1994 to 1999. He was also part of Colombia's squad for the 1999 Copa América tournament.
