= Alexander Viveros =

Colombian footballer (born 1977)

Personal information
- Full name: Alexander Viveros Sánchez
- Date of birth: 8 October 1977 (age 49)
- Place of birth: Cali, Colombia
- Height: 1.77 m (5 ft 9 1/2 in)
- Position: Left back

Senior career*
Years	Team	Apps	(Gls)
1997–1999	Deportivo Cali	56	(1)
2000	Cruzeiro	13	(2)
2001	Fluminense	0	(0)
2001–2002	Racing Club	30	(0)
2002	Cruzeiro	11	(0)
2003–2004	Boavista	26	(0)
2004–2005	Nantes	26	(0)
2005–2006	Grasshoppers	5	(0)
2006–2007	Deportivo Cali	31	(0)
2007–2008	Talleres	13	(0)
2010	Boyacá Chicó	28	(0)
2012	Deportivo Cali	2	(0)
Total		241	(3)

International career
1999–2005	Colombia	34	(2)
- * Club domestic league appearances and goals

Alexander Viveros Sánchez (born 8 October 1977) is a Colombian retired footballer who played as a left back.

Other than in his own, he played in five countries in a 14-year professional career. Viveros represented Colombia at the 1999 Copa América.

== Club career ==
Born in Cali, Viveros started playing professionally in 1996 with hometown's Deportivo Cali, appearing in 21 games in his second year as the club won the national championship. In 2000, he moved to Brazil and signed for Cruzeiro Esporte Clube, joining Fluminense FC in the following year but leaving the Rio de Janeiro side shortly after.

Viveros spent the 2001–02 campaign in Argentina with Racing Club de Avellaneda, appearing regularly as they won the Apertura tournament. In January 2003, after a second spell with Cruzeiro, he moved to Portugal with Boavista F.C., playing 24 Primeira Liga matches in his only full season, with the Porto team ranking in eighth place.

Viveros met different fates with his next two clubs, starting with FC Nantes in France – albeit only in his first year in Ligue 1, with Nantes finishing in 17th, the first position above the relegation zone – but being a reserve with Swiss Super League side Grasshopper Club Zürich, for which he signed in January 2006. He then returned to his country and Deportivo Cali for a further two seasons.

In 2007–08, Viveros competed in Argentina with Talleres de Córdoba, in Primera B Nacional. After one year out of football, he closed out his career at nearly 33 with Boyacá Chicó FC.

== International career ==
Viveros gained 34 caps for Colombia during six years (two goals), being selected for the squad that appeared at the 1999 Copa América in Paraguay, and being a starter in an eventual quarter-final exit.

== Honours ==
- Categoría Primera A: 1998
- Copa do Brasil: 2000
- Argentine Primera División: 2001 Apertura
