= Roberto Carlos Cortés =

Colombian footballer (born 1977)

Roberto Carlos Cortés Restrepo
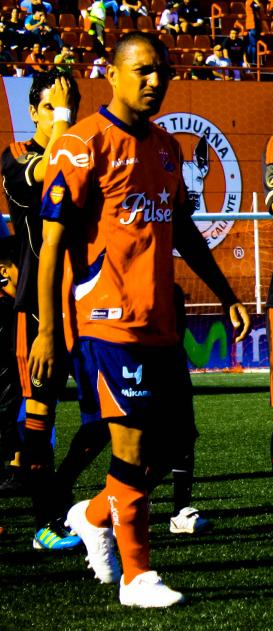
- Roberto Carlos Cortés

Personal information
- Full name: Roberto Carlos Cortés Restrepo
- Date of birth: 20 June 1977 (age 49)
- Place of birth: Medellín, Colombia
- Height: 1.75 m (5 ft 9 in)
- Position: Defender

Team information
- Current team: Independiente Medellín

Senior career*
Years	Team	Apps	(Gls)
1997	Once Caldas	?	(?)
1998–2003	Independiente Medellín	?	(?)
2003–2004	Zacatepec	?	(?)
2004	Deportivo Cali	21	(0)
2005	Libertad	?	(?)
2005–2007	Independiente Medellín	79	(7)
2008	Millonarios	?	(?)
2008–2009	Junior	?	(?)
2010–	Independiente Medellín	?	(?)

International career
1999–2003	Colombia	25	(0)
- * Club domestic league appearances and goals as of September 2008

Roberto Carlos Cortés Restrepo (born 20 June 1977) is a Colombian former footballer who previously played as a defender for Independiente Medellín.

Cortés played most of his career with Independiente Medellín, where he was part of the Championship-winning team in 2002-II.

Cortés played 25 times for the Colombia national team between 1999 and 2003. His most famous achievement was helping them to win their first ever Copa América in 2001.

== Honours ==
Independiente Medellín

- Categoría Primera A: 2002-II

Colombia

- Copa América: 2001
- CONCACAF Gold Cup runner-up: 2000
