= Leonel Pilipauskas =

Uruguayan footballer (born 1975)

Personal information
- Full name: Leonel Eduardo Pilipauskas Rodríguez
- Date of birth: 18 May 1975 (age 51)
- Place of birth: Montevideo, Uruguay
- Height: 1.80 m (5 ft 11 in)
- Position: Defensive midfielder

Team information
- Current team: Bella Vista (assistant)

Senior career*
Years	Team	Apps	(Gls)
1994–1999	Bella Vista	28	(2)
1999–2000	Atlético Madrid	4	(0)
2001–2003	Peñarol	40	(0)
2004	Fénix	11	(1)
2005–2008	Instituto	100	(3)
2008–2009	Fénix	15	(0)
2009–2010	Platense	47	(1)
2010–2012	Fénix	28	(1)
2012–2013	Bella Vista	38	(2)
2013–2014	Deportivo Maldonado	24	(1)
2014–2016	Boston River	42	(1)
Total		377	(12)

International career
1999	Uruguay	4	(0)

Managerial career
- 2016–2019: Villa Española (assistant)
- 2020–: Bella Vista (assistant)
- * Club domestic league appearances and goals

Leonel Eduardo Pilipauskas Rodríguez (born 18 May 1975) is a Uruguayan former professional footballer who played as a defensive midfielder, and is the assistant manager of Bella Vista.

== Club career ==
Pilipauskas was born in Montevideo. In his country, he played for C.A. Bella Vista, Peñarol and Centro Atlético Fénix. This was punctuated by a spell with Spanish club Atlético Madrid in the 1999–2000 season, which was anything but successful (only four La Liga matches, relegation to Segunda División).

In 2005, Pilipauskas moved to neighbouring Argentina, going on to represent Instituto Atlético Central Córdoba and Club Atlético Platense, the former in the Primera División. He briefly returned to Fénix in between.

== International career ==
Pilipauskas made four appearances for Uruguay during 1999, including two matches at that year's Copa América. His debut came on 17 June in a friendly with Paraguay, in Ciudad del Este.

== Coaching career ==
In January 2020, Pilipauskas returned to Bella Vista as an assistant manager under Jorge Casanova.

== Honours ==
Peñarol

- Uruguayan Primera División: 2003

Uruguay

- Copa América runner-up: 1999
