= Rubiel Quintana =

Colombian footballer (born 1978)

Personal information
- Full name: Rubiel Quintana
- Date of birth: June 26, 1978 (age 48)
- Place of birth: Cali, Colombia
- Height: 1.82 m (6 ft 0 in)
- Positions: Defender; midfielder

Senior career*
Years	Team	Apps	(Gls)
1999	Cortuluá	38	(10)
2000	América de Cali	0	(0)
2001	Deportivo Cali	13	(3)
2001–2002	Belgrano	11	(1)
2003	Çaykur Rizespor	1	(0)
2004	Centauros	0	(0)
2004	Atlético Huila	0	(0)
2005	Unión Magdalena	5	(1)
2005	Envigado	18	(0)
2005–2006	Monagas	0	(0)
2006	Cortuluá	0	(0)
2007	Boyacá Chico	14	(0)
2008–2009	Deportivo Pereira	3	(0)
2010	Cortuluá	0	(0)

International career^{‡}
1999–2001	Colombia	13	(0)
- * Club domestic league appearances and goals as of November 12, 2012 ‡ National team caps and goals as of November 12, 2012

Rubiel Quintana (born June 26, 1978) is a Colombian former footballer that played for clubs from Colombia, Argentina and Turkey.

== Titles ==
- América de Cali 2000 (Colombian League)
