= Agustín Delgado =

Ecuadorian footballer (born 1974)

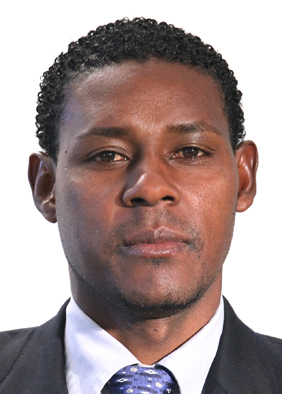
- Delgado in 2016

Personal information
- Full name: Agustín Javier Delgado Chalá
- Date of birth: 23 December 1974 (age 51)
- Place of birth: Ambuquí, Imbabura, Ecuador
- Height: 1.88 m (6 ft 2 in)
- Position: Forward

Senior career*
| Years | Team | Apps | (Gls) |
| 1991–1992 | ESPOLI | 12 | (6) |
| 1993–1994 | Barcelona SC | 30 | (25) |
| 1995–1996 | El Nacional | 30 | (30) |
| 1997 | Independiente Medellín | 0 | (0) |
| 1997–1998 | Barcelona SC | 34 | (15) |
| 1998 | Cruz Azul | 8 | (2) |
| 1999–2001 | Necaxa | 83 | (38) |
| 2001–2004 | Southampton | 11 | (1) |
| 2004 | Aucas | 13 | (7) |
| 2004 | UNAM | 11 | (1) |
| 2005 | Barcelona SC | 38 | (10) |
| 2006–2008 | L.D.U. Quito | 69 | (24) |
| 2009 | Emelec | 8 | (0) |
| 2010 | Valle del Chota | 7 | (0) |
| Total | | 324 | (159) |

International career
| 1994–2011 | Ecuador | 72 | (31) |
- * Club domestic league appearances and goals

Agustín Delgado

Member of the National Assembly for Imbabura Province
- Incumbent
- Assumed office 14 May 2013

Personal details
- Party: PAIS Alliance

Agustín Javier Delgado Chalá (born 23 December 1974) is an Ecuadorian politician and former professional footballer who played as a forward. Nicknamed El Tín, he was the all-time top scorer for the Ecuador national team with 31 goals in 72 games, before being overtaken by Enner Valencia. Delgado played professional club football in Ecuador, Mexico and England.

Delgado made his debut for Ecuador against Peru in 1994. He was part of their squad at the FIFA World Cup in 2002 and 2006, becoming the first Ecuadorian to score a goal at the tournament.

== Club career ==
=== Early career ===
Delgado started his career in his native Ecuador with ESPOLI in 1991 before joining Barcelona SC in 1994, where he played for one year, winning the Ecuadorian Serie A in 1995. He then joined El Nacional and again won the Ecuadorian league title, before returning to Barcelona and securing a third consecutive league winner's medal.

In 1998, Delgado moved to Mexico where he had a brief spell at Cruz Azul. He joined CONCACAF champions Necaxa in 1999 and represented the club at the 2000 FIFA Club World Championship, scoring against South Melbourne in the group stage, and in the third-place play-off against Real Madrid he scored in normal time as well as the winning penalty in the shootout.

In late 2001, after scoring nine times as Ecuador qualified for its first World Cup, Necaxa accepted a £3.5m bid from English Premier League club Southampton.

=== Southampton ===
Delgado moved to Southampton in 2001. Unfortunately, he was dogged by injuries which restricted him to only a few games during his time with the Saints. Southampton unsuccessfully tried to get him back to fitness after he was injured in Necaxa prior to the 2002 World Cup Qualifiers.

It might have been a different story had the striker refused to play while injured during the 2002 World Cup. The pressure on him to play was enormous, as Ecuadorians believed that, with nine goals during the 2002 World cup qualifying campaign, he was indispensable; and naturally, Delgado dreamed of playing in a FIFA World Cup. All that led to his decision to play despite injury while heavily medicated on painkillers. Upon return to England, it was found that his injury had become chronic, effectively destroying his future in Europe. He also alienated manager Gordon Strachan by refusing to learn English, and Strachan felt the player had been forced on the club and was very high maintenance. When pressed for his plans for the Ecuadorian, Strachan replied "I've got more important things to think about. I've got a yoghurt to finish by today, the expiry date is today. That can be my priority rather than Agustin Delgado."

However, Delgado scored the winning goal for Southampton in a 3–2 home victory over the then Premiership champions Arsenal. He also scored a goal against Liverpool in the League Cup.

=== Later career ===
After the unhappy spell at Southampton, he was released and returned to Ecuador to play for a Quito based club Aucas, which was topping the Ecuador Serie A with the likes of René Higuita and Gustavo Figueroa leading the way. He played an impressive half season and his return to form led to his joining Mexican club UNAM, where he helped the team win the league championship.

Delgado was then transferred to Barcelona SC from UNAM on 1 January 2005 for an undisclosed fee. While at Barcelona SC, he teamed up with his preferred Ecuador strike partner Iván Kaviedes. With these two formidable strikers leading the attack, the Guayaquil based club were expected to not only win championships, but to dominate the league. This did not happen. Delgado started strongly, but ended the season with only 7 goals. He was subsequently accused by the club president, Isidro Romero Carbo, of not taking the club seriously despite earning top wages. Following reports that Tin was partying late at wild clubs with teammates Edwin Villafuerte and Walter Ayovi, prompting their exits from the prestigious club.

Delgado then joined L.D.U. Quito, a team regularly featuring in the Copa Sudamericana and Copa Libertadores. With his new club, Tin again returned to scoring form and with his goal exploits, he helped Liga surprisingly reach the quarterfinals of the 2006 Copa Libertadores. Delgado was one of eleven players banned for between 2 and 12 months for taking part in a vicious brawl at the end of LDU's 1–1 draw at home to Barcelona on 17 December 2006. Four Barcelona players were injured in the incident on the last day of the season which shocked the country and overshadowed the title won by El Nacional. The Ecuadorian Football Federation (FEF) said on its web site that the incident started with a clash between Delgado and his marker, Víctor Montoya. Montoya later denied that he had deliberately kicked Delgado's injured knee and received no sanction from the FEF. Delgado later said in the National Congress of Ecuador that he had been persecuted by the FEF.

Delgado was then involved in a scandal at a night club on New Year's Eve and left the country to try to continue his career in Major League Soccer. However, FIFA later blocked this by extending the playing ban internationally. The suspension was subsequently changed at an Extraordinary Congress of the FEF, and Delgado was allowed to resume his playing career after 6 months' suspension.

In 2008, he was part of the squad that won the Copa Libertadores, although he did not play in the final decisive game.

In March 2009, the forward signed for Emelec until December 2009. During the 2010 season, he was a player/administrator at Valle de Chota in his native town. He helped guide the club to promotion from the Segunda Categoria to the Serie B for the 2011 season. In February 2011, he announced his retirement from professional football to focus on administering the club.

== International career ==
Delgado's first goal at the 2002 FIFA World Cup was also the first goal for the Ecuadorian team in a World Cup, against Mexico. Delgado was joint top scorer (with Hernán Crespo) in the CONMEBOL qualifiers for the tournament with nine goals.

Delgado helped Ecuador qualify once again for the 2006 FIFA World Cup, contributing five goals in ten games, but stated that the 2006 tournament would be his last. Delgado scored in the 80th minute in Ecuador's shock 2–0 win in their opening match against Poland. In the following game, he scored in the 55th minute of a 3–0 victory over Costa Rica, enabling Ecuador to qualify alongside hosts Germany for the last 16.

After the 2006 World Cup, Delgado announced his retirement from international football. He returned for a farewell match against Costa Rica in September 2011 where he played the final five minutes, finishing his international career with 72 caps and a then-record 31 goals for Ecuador.

== Political career ==
In the Ecuadorian general election of 2013 Delgado was chosen as member of the National Assembly for Imbabura Province. Delgado serves as member of PAIS Alliance. Ulises de la Cruz and Iván Hurtado, former teammates of Delgado at the national team also serve for the Pais Alliance in the National Assembly. Delgado, who has African ancestry, stutters and has been the object of ridicule on social media and by the cartoonist Xavier Bonilla in the newspaper El Universo. The cartoonist and the newspaper were sanctioned by La SUPERCOM, La Superintendencia de la Información y Comunicación, an Ecuadorean agency that regulates communications. According to Freedom House, a Washington, DC–based NGO, the sanction was evidence of censorship by the Correa government.

== Career statistics ==
=== Club ===
Appearances and goals by club, season and competition
| Club | Season | League | | | National cup | | League cup | | Continental | | Total | |
| Club | Season | Division | Apps | Goals | Apps | Goals | Apps | Goals | Apps | Goals | Apps | Goals |
|---|---|---|---|---|---|---|---|---|---|---|---|---|
| ESPOLI | 1991 | Ecuadorian Serie B | | | — | | — | | — | | | |
| ESPOLI | 1992 | Ecuadorian Serie B | | | — | | — | | — | | | |
| ESPOLI | Total | | | | — | | — | | — | | | |
| Barcelona SC | 1993 | Ecuadorian Serie A | | 13 | — | | — | | 0 | 0 | | 13 |
| Barcelona SC | 1994 | Ecuadorian Serie A | | 12 | — | | — | | 4 | 2 | 4 | 14 |
| Barcelona SC | Total | | | 25 | — | | — | | 4 | 2 | 4 | 27 |
| El Nacional | 1995 | Ecuadorian Serie A | | 11 | — | | — | | 6 | 0 | 6 | 11 |
| El Nacional | 1996 | Ecuadorian Serie A | 30 | 19 | — | | — | | 0 | 0 | 30 | 19 |
| El Nacional | Total | | 30 | 30 | — | | — | | 6 | 0 | 36 | 30 |
| Independiente Medellín | 1997 | Categoría Primera A | | | — | | — | | | | | |
| Barcelona SC | 1997 | Ecuadorian Serie A | 25 | 12 | — | | — | | 0 | 0 | 25 | 12 |
| Barcelona SC | 1998 | Ecuadorian Serie A | 9 | 3 | — | | — | | 8 | 5 | 17 | 8 |
| Barcelona SC | Total | | 34 | 15 | — | | — | | 8 | 5 | 42 | 20 |
| Cruz Azul | Invierno 1998 | Liga MX | 8 | 2 | 0 | 0 | — | | 0 | 0 | 8 | 2 |
| Necaxa | Verano 1999 | Liga MX | 13 | 4 | 0 | 0 | — | | 0 | 0 | 13 | 4 |
| Necaxa | 1999–2000 | Liga MX | 29 | 25 | 0 | 0 | — | | 4 | 2 | 33 | 27 |
| Necaxa | 2000–01 | Liga MX | 32 | 7 | 0 | 0 | — | | 2 | 4 | 32 | 11 |
| Necaxa | 2001–02 | Liga MX | 9 | 2 | 0 | 0 | — | | 0 | 0 | 9 | 2 |
| Necaxa | Total | | 83 | 38 | 0 | 0 | — | | 7 | 7 | 90 | 45 |
| Southampton | 2001–02 | Premier League | 1 | 0 | 1 | 0 | 0 | 0 | 0 | 0 | 2 | 0 |
| Southampton | 2002–03 | Premier League | 6 | 1 | 0 | 0 | 1 | 1 | 0 | 0 | 7 | 2 |
| Southampton | 2003–04 | Premier League | 4 | 0 | 0 | 0 | 2 | 0 | 0 | 0 | 6 | 0 |
| Southampton | Total | | 11 | 1 | 1 | 0 | 3 | 1 | 0 | 0 | 15 | 2 |
| Aucas | 2004 | Ecuadorian Serie A | 13 | 7 | — | | — | | 1 | 0 | 14 | 7 |
| UNAM | Apertura 2004 | Liga MX | 11 | 1 | 0 | 0 | — | | 0 | 0 | 11 | 1 |
| Barcelona SC | 2005 | Ecuadorian Serie A | 38 | 10 | — | | — | | 0 | 0 | 38 | 10 |
| L.D.U. Quito | 2006 | Ecuadorian Serie A | 31 | 12 | — | | — | | 11 | 6 | 42 | 18 |
| L.D.U. Quito | 2007 | Ecuadorian Serie A | 20 | 6 | — | | — | | 0 | 0 | 20 | 6 |
| L.D.U. Quito | 2008 | Ecuadorian Serie A | 18 | 6 | — | | — | | 12 | 1 | 30 | 7 |
| L.D.U. Quito | Total | | 69 | 24 | — | | — | | 23 | 7 | 92 | 31 |
| Emelec | 2009 | Ecuadorian Serie A | 8 | 0 | — | | — | | 1 | 0 | 9 | 0 |
| Valle del Chota | 2010 | Segunda Categoría | 7 | 0 | — | | — | | — | | 7 | 0 |
| Career total | | | 312 | 153 | 1 | 0 | 3 | 1 | 50 | 21 | 366 | 175 |

=== International ===
Appearances and goals by national team and year
| National team | Year | Apps | Goals |
|---|---|---|---|
| Ecuador | 1994 | 1 | 0 |
| Ecuador | 1995 | 2 | 0 |
| Ecuador | 1996 | 3 | 2 |
| Ecuador | 1997 | 9 | 3 |
| Ecuador | 1998 | 0 | 0 |
| Ecuador | 1999 | 8 | 2 |
| Ecuador | 2000 | 10 | 6 |
| Ecuador | 2001 | 11 | 7 |
| Ecuador | 2002 | 5 | 2 |
| Ecuador | 2003 | 0 | 0 |
| Ecuador | 2004 | 10 | 4 |
| Ecuador | 2005 | 8 | 3 |
| Ecuador | 2006 | 4 | 2 |
| Ecuador | 2007 | 0 | 0 |
| Ecuador | 2008 | 0 | 0 |
| Ecuador | 2009 | 0 | 0 |
| Ecuador | 2010 | 0 | 0 |
| Ecuador | 2011 | 1 | 0 |
| Total | | 72 | 31 |

Scores and results list Ecuador's goal tally first, score column indicates score after each Delgado goal.

List of international goals scored by Agustín Delgado
| No. | Date | Venue | Opponent | Score | Result | Competition |
|---|---|---|---|---|---|---|
| 1 | 4 October 1996 | Estadio Bellavista, Ambato, Ecuador | Jamaica | 1–0 | 2–1 | Friendly |
| 2 | 4 October 1996 | Estadio Bellavista, Ambato, Ecuador | Jamaica | 2–1 | 2–1 | Friendly |
| 3 | 5 February 1997 | Estadio Azteca, Mexico City, Mexico | Mexico | 1–3 | 1–3 | Friendly |
| 4 | 17 February 1997 | Estadio Olímpico Atahualpa, Quito, Ecuador | Uruguay | 2–0 | 4–0 | 1998 FIFA World Cup qualifier |
| 5 | 17 February 1997 | Estadio Olímpico Atahualpa, Quito, Ecuador | Uruguay | 3–0 | 4–0 | 1998 FIFA World Cup qualifier |
| 6 | 4 June 1999 | Commonwealth Stadium, Edmonton, Canada | Guatemala | 2–1 | 3–1 | 1999 Canada Cup |
| 7 | 15 June 1999 | Estadio Polideportivo de Pueblo Nuevo, San Cristóbal, Venezuela | Venezuela | 2–0 | 2–3 | Friendly |
| 8 | 29 March 2000 | Estadio de Liga Deportiva Universitaria, Quito, Ecuador | Venezuela | 1–0 | 2–0 | 2002 FIFA World Cup qualifier |
| 9 | 25 June 2000 | Estadio Olímpico Atahualpa, Quito, Ecuador | Panama | 1–0 | 5–0 | Friendly |
| 10 | 25 June 2000 | Estadio Olímpico Atahualpa, Quito, Ecuador | Panama | 3–0 | 5–0 | Friendly |
| 11 | 16 August 2000 | Estadio de Liga Deportiva Universitaria, Quito, Ecuador | Bolivia | 1–0 | 2–0 | 2002 FIFA World Cup qualifier |
| 12 | 16 August 2000 | Estadio de Liga Deportiva Universitaria, Quito, Ecuador | Bolivia | 2–0 | 2–0 | 2002 FIFA World Cup qualifier |
| 13 | 8 October 2000 | Estadio Olímpico Atahualpa, Quito, Ecuador | Chile | 1–0 | 1–0 | 2002 FIFA World Cup qualifier |
| 14 | 28 March 2001 | Estadio Olímpico Atahualpa, Quito, Ecuador | Brazil | 1–0 | 1–0 | 2002 FIFA World Cup qualifier |
| 15 | 24 April 2001 | Estadio Olímpico Atahualpa, Quito, Ecuador | Paraguay | 1–1 | 2–1 | 2002 FIFA World Cup qualifier |
| 16 | 24 April 2001 | Estadio Olímpico Atahualpa, Quito, Ecuador | Paraguay | 2–1 | 2–1 | 2002 FIFA World Cup qualifier |
| 17 | 2 June 2001 | Estadio Monumental, Lima, Peru | Peru | 2–1 | 2–1 | 2002 FIFA World Cup qualifier |
| 18 | 17 July 2001 | Estadio Metropolitano Roberto Meléndez, Barranquilla, Colombia | Venezuela | 1–0 | 4–0 | 2001 Copa América |
| 19 | 17 July 2001 | Estadio Metropolitano Roberto Meléndez, Barranquilla, Colombia | Venezuela | 4–0 | 4–0 | 2001 Copa América |
| 20 | 6 October 2001 | Estadio Hernando Siles, La Paz, Bolivia | Bolivia | 2–0 | 5–1 | 2002 FIFA World Cup qualifier |
| 21 | 8 May 2002 | Giants Stadium, East Rutherford, United States | Yugoslavia | 1–0 | 1–0 | Friendly |
| 22 | 8 June 2002 | Miyagi Stadium, Miyagi, Japan | Mexico | 1–0 | 1–2 | 2002 FIFA World Cup |
| 23 | 2 June 2004 | Estadio Olímpico Atahualpa, Quito, Ecuador | Colombia | 1–0 | 2–1 | 2006 FIFA World Cup qualifier |
| 24 | 5 June 2004 | Estadio Olímpico Atahualpa, Quito, Ecuador | Bolivia | 2–1 | 3–2 | 2006 FIFA World Cup qualifier |
| 25 | 7 July 2004 | Estadio Elías Aguirre, Chiclayo, Peru | Argentina | 1–1 | 1–6 | 2004 Copa América |
| 26 | 13 July 2004 | Estadio Miguel Grau, Piura, Peru | Mexico | 1–2 | 1–2 | 2004 Copa América |
| 27 | 4 June 2005 | Estadio Olímpico Atahualpa, Quito, Ecuador | Argentina | 2–0 | 2–0 | 2006 FIFA World Cup qualifier |
| 28 | 3 September 2005 | Estadio Hernando Siles, La Paz, Bolivia | Bolivia | 1–0 | 2–1 | 2006 FIFA World Cup qualifier |
| 29 | 3 September 2005 | Estadio Hernando Siles, La Paz, Bolivia | Bolivia | 2–1 | 2–1 | 2006 FIFA World Cup qualifier |
| 30 | 9 June 2006 | FIFA WM Stadion Gelsenkirchen, Gelsenkirchen, Germany | Poland | 2–0 | 2–0 | 2006 FIFA World Cup |
| 31 | 15 June 2006 | FIFA WM Stadion Hamburg, Hamburg, Germany | Costa Rica | 2–0 | 3–0 | 2006 FIFA World Cup |

== Honours ==
Barcelona SC

- Serie A: 1995, 1997

El Nacional

- Serie A: 1996

Necaxa

- CONCACAF Champions Cup: 1999

UNAM

- Primera División: 2004 Apertura

L.D.U. Quito

- Serie A: 2007
- Copa Libertadores: 2008

Ecuador

- Canada Cup: 1999
