= Atlético Audaz =

Ecuadorean sports club

- Full name: Club Deportivo Atlético Audaz
- Nicknames: Equipo bananero (Banana team); Equipo palmera (Palm team); El Ciclón Bananero (The Banana Cyclone); Verdolaga; Los verdiblancos (The green-and-whites)
- Founded: September 2, 1988; 37 years ago
- Ground: Estadio 9 de Mayo
- Capacity: 16,500
- Chairman: Esteban Quirola Bustos
- Manager: Marcos Villarroel
- League: Segunda Categoría
- 2011: Serie B, 12th (relegated)
Home colours	Away colours

Club Deportivo Atlético Audaz is a sports club based in Machala, Ecuador. They are best known for their professional football team, which played in the second level of Ecuadorian football, the Serie B.

== Achievements ==
- Campeonato de Segunda
  - Runner-up (1): 2008

== See also ==
- Serie B de Ecuador
