= Hólger Quiñónez =

Ecuadorian footballer (born 1962)

Personal information
- Full name: Hólger Abraham Quiñónez Caicedo
- Date of birth: 18 September 1962 (age 64)
- Place of birth: San Carlos, Ecuador
- Height: 1.82 m (5 ft 11 1/2 in)
- Position: Centre back

Senior career*
Years	Team	Apps	(Gls)
1980–1989	Barcelona	234	(8)
1990	Vasco Gama	30	(0)
1991	Emelec	9	(0)
1991–1995	União Madeira	83	(3)
1995–1997	Deportivo Pereira	44	(1)
1997	Deportivo Quito		
1998–2000	Barcelona	33	(0)
Total		433	(12)

International career
1984–1999	Ecuador	50	(0)

Managerial career
- 2007: Barcelona
- * Club domestic league appearances and goals

Hólger Abraham Quiñónez Caicedo (born 18 September 1962) is an Ecuadorian retired footballer who played as a central defender.

== Club career ==
Quiñónez was born in San Carlos, Los Ríos Province. During his 20-year professional career he played for Barcelona SC (where he also retired, in 2000), Brazil's CR Vasco da Gama, C.S. Emelec, C.F. União in Portugal, Deportivo Pereira from Colombia and S.D. Quito.

Voted once the best CONMEBOL player in his position, Quiñónez briefly managed main club Barcelona in 2007.

== International career ==
Quiñónez earned a total of 50 caps for the Ecuador national team during 15 years, and represented the country in five Copa América tournaments. He featured in seven FIFA World Cup qualification matches.
