= Pedro Portocarrero (footballer) =

Colombian footballer (born 1977)

Personal information
- Full name: Pedro Paulo Portocarrero Angulo
- Date of birth: 13 May 1977 (age 49)
- Place of birth: Buenaventura, Colombia
- Height: 1.90 m (6 ft 3 in)
- Position: Defender

Youth career
- Independiente Santa Fe

Senior career*
Years	Team	Apps	(Gls)
1999	Independiente Santa Fe		
2000	Tenerife	1	(0)
2000–2001	San Lorenzo	13	(1)
2001–2004	Independiente Santa Fe	78	(0)
2005	Atlético Huila	25	(0)
2006–2010	Cúcuta Deportivo	151	(5)
2011	Libertad	10	(0)
2012	Patriotas	27	(1)
2013–2014	La Equidad	46	(0)

International career
1999–2008	Colombia	10	(0)
- * Club domestic league appearances and goals as of 20 April 2014

Pedro Paulo Portocarrero Angulo (born 13 May 1977) is a Colombian footballer.

Honors

- Champions Colombian Primera A, 2006: Cúcuta Deportivo
- Semi Finalist of Copa Libertadores, 2007: Cúcuta Deportivo
