= 1999 Canada Cup =

Maple Cup

Tournament details
- Host country: Canada
- Dates: June 2–6
- Teams: 4 (from 3 confederations)
- Venue(s): Commonwealth Stadium; Edmonton, Alberta

Final positions
- Champions: Ecuador
- Runners-up: Iran
- Third place: Canada
- Fourth place: Guatemala

Tournament statistics
- Matches played: 6
- Goals scored: 16 (2.67 per match)
- Top scorer: (Ecuador) Ariel Graziani (3 goals)

The Canada Cup (a.k.a. Maple Cup) of 1999 was an international football (soccer) tournament played at the Commonwealth Stadium in Edmonton, Alberta, Canada from June 2, 1999, to June 6, 1999. It included hosts Canada, Iran, Ecuador and Guatemala, which replaced the Brazil Olympic Team.

All games were considered full FIFA international games. Ecuador's striker Ariel Graziani became top scorer of the event, scoring three goals in three matches.

== Final table ==
| Team | Pld | W | D | L | GF | GA | GD | Pts |
|---|---|---|---|---|---|---|---|---|
| Ecuador | 3 | 2 | 1 | 0 | 6 | 3 | +3 | 7 |
| Iran | 3 | 1 | 2 | 0 | 4 | 3 | +1 | 5 |
| Canada | 3 | 1 | 0 | 2 | 3 | 3 | 0 | 3 |
| Guatemala | 3 | 0 | 1 | 2 | 3 | 7 | -4 | 1 |

== Results ==
June 2, 1999

| Ecuador | 1–1 | Iran |
|---|---|---|
| Montaño 39' | | Mousavi 66' |

Commonwealth Stadium, Edmonton
Attendance: 5,386
Referee: Mike Seifert (Canada)
June 2, 1999

| Canada | 2–0 | Guatemala |
|---|---|---|
| Stalteri 42'; De Vos 62' |

Commonwealth Stadium, Edmonton
Attendance: 5,821
Referee: Kevin Terry (United States)
June 4, 1999

| Ecuador | 3–1 | Guatemala |
|---|---|---|
| Graziani 15', 56'; Delgado 48' | | Rivera 20' |

Commonwealth Stadium, Edmonton
Attendance: 8,865
Referee: Jerry Proctor (Canada)
June 4, 1999

| Canada | 0–1 | Iran |
|---|---|---|
| | | Daei 71' |

Commonwealth Stadium, Edmonton
Attendance: 8,865
Referee: Antonio Mendoza (United States)
June 6, 1999

| Iran | 2–2 | Guatemala |
|---|---|---|
| Hamedani 53'; Hashemian 89' | | Rivera 51'; García 79' |

Commonwealth Stadium, Edmonton
Attendance: 8,865
Referee: Kevin Terry (United States)
June 6, 1999

| Canada | 1–2 | Ecuador |
|---|---|---|
| Xausa 50' | | Graziani 17'; DeVos 54' (o.g.) |

Commonwealth Stadium, Edmonton
Attendance: 10,026
Referee: Antonio Marrufo (Mexico)
