= Canada Cup (soccer) =

Men's invitational football tournament held in Canada

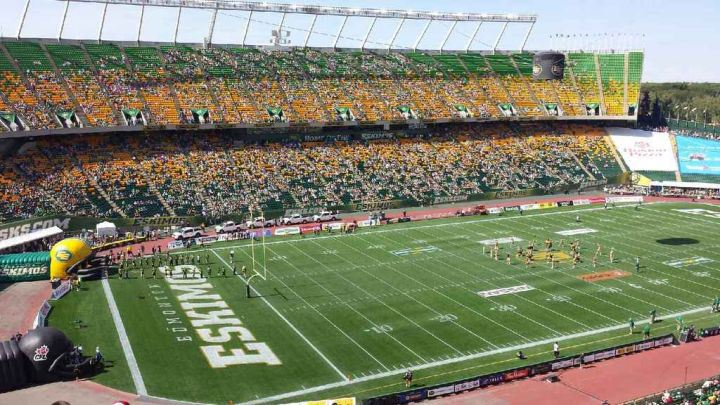
- Commonwealth Stadium, where the first edition of the invitational was held in 1995
- Sport: Association football
- Founded: 1995; 31 years ago
- First season: 1995
- Folded: 1999
- No. of teams: 3 or 4
- Country: Canada
- Venue: Commonwealth Stadium
- Continent: Worldwide
- Last champion: Ecuador (1st title) (1999)
- Most titles: Chile; Ecuador (1 title each)
- Tournament format: Round-robin

The Canada Cup, also known as the Maple Cup, was a men's invitational international association football tournament for national teams. Its first edition in 1995 was held at Commonwealth Stadium in Edmonton, Alberta and was contested by three nations. The second and final tournament in 1999 was also held in Edmonton and included four nations.

== Results ==
Year	Winners	Runners-up	Third place	Fourth place
1995	Chile	Canada	Northern Ireland	N/A
1999	Ecuador	Iran	Canada	Guatemala

== See also ==
- 2025 Canadian Shield
