= 2002 FIFA World Cup Group A =

Football teams

Group A was one of eight groups at the 2002 FIFA World Cup. It consisted of defending champions France, two-time winners Uruguay, Denmark and debutants Senegal. The group's first match was played on 31 May 2002 and the last on 11 June 2002.

From the outset, it was apparent that the group would not pan out as expected, as Senegal beat France 1–0 in the opening match of the tournament. France followed this with a goalless draw against Uruguay, in a match in which their star striker Thierry Henry was sent off, before rounding out the group with another defeat to Denmark. Senegal's other two matches finished as draws, including a well-earned point against Denmark and a bad-tempered game against Uruguay, in which 12 players were booked.

Denmark started the group well, beating Uruguay in Ulsan, before a late Senegalese equaliser in Daegu prevented them from qualifying for the round of 16 with a match to spare. Instead, they were forced to play France, knowing that a draw would see them through to the next round. They won 2–0 and finished top of the group thanks to Senegal's draw with Uruguay.

Dark horses Uruguay never really got going, with their high point being a goalless draw with a sub-par French side. They did manage to put three goals past Senegal in a high-scoring draw, but their loss to Denmark in their opening match had dashed any hopes they may have had of reaching the next round.

== Standings ==
Pos	Team	Pld	W	D	L	GF	GA	GD	Pts	Qualification
1	Denmark	3	2	1	0	5	2	+3	7	Advance to knockout stage
2	Senegal	3	1	2	0	5	4	+1	5	Advance to knockout stage
3	Uruguay	3	0	2	1	4	5	−1	2	
4	France	3	0	1	2	0	3	−3	1	

Source: FIFA
Rules for classification: Tie-breaking criteria
- Denmark advanced to play England (runner-up of Group F) in the round of 16.
- Senegal advanced to play Sweden (winner of Group F) in the round of 16.

== Matches ==
All times are local (UTC+9)

=== France vs Senegal ===
31 May 2002
20:30

France	0–1	Senegal
		Bouba Diop 30'

Seoul World Cup Stadium, Seoul
Attendance: 62,561
Referee: Ali Bujsaim (United Arab Emirates)

France	Senegal

GK	16	Fabien Barthez
RB	15	Lilian Thuram
CB	18	Frank Leboeuf
CB	8	Marcel Desailly (c)
LB	3	Bixente Lizarazu
CM	4	Patrick Vieira
CM	17	Emmanuel Petit	(yellow card) 45+2'
RW	11	Sylvain Wiltord		(substituted off) 81'
AM	6	Youri Djorkaeff		(substituted off) 60'
LW	12	Thierry Henry
CF	20	David Trezeguet
Substitutions:
FW	21	Christophe Dugarry		(substituted on) 60'
FW	9	Djibril Cissé		(substituted on) 81'
Manager:
Roger Lemerre

GK	1	Tony Sylva
RB	17	Ferdinand Coly
CB	13	Lamine Diatta
CB	4	Pape Malick Diop
LB	2	Omar Daf
DM	6	Aliou Cissé (c)	(yellow card) 51'
RM	14	Moussa N'Diaye
CM	19	Papa Bouba Diop
CM	15	Salif Diao
LM	10	Khalilou Fadiga
CF	11	El Hadji Diouf
Manager:
(France) Bruno Metsu

Man of the Match:
El Hadji Diouf (Senegal)

Assistant referees:
Ali Al-Traifi (Saudi Arabia)
Jorge Rattalino (Argentina)
Fourth official:
Felipe Ramos (Mexico)

=== Uruguay vs Denmark ===
1 June 2002
18:00

Uruguay	1–2	Denmark
Rodríguez 47'		Tomasson 45', 83'

Munsu Cup Stadium, Ulsan
Attendance: 30,157
Referee: Saad Mane (Kuwait)

Uruguay	Denmark

GK	1	Fabián Carini
RB	2	Gustavo Méndez	(yellow card) 25'
CB	14	Gonzalo Sorondo
CB	4	Paolo Montero (c)
LB	6	Darío Rodríguez		(substituted off) 87'
RM	8	Gustavo Varela
CM	5	Pablo García
LM	7	Gianni Guigou
AM	20	Álvaro Recoba		(substituted off) 80'
CF	9	Darío Silva
CF	13	Sebastián Abreu		(substituted off) 88'
Substitutions:
FW	17	Mario Regueiro		(substituted on) 80'
FW	11	Federico Magallanes		(substituted on) 87'
FW	18	Richard Morales		(substituted on) 88'
Manager:
Víctor Púa

GK	1	Thomas Sørensen
RB	6	Thomas Helveg
CB	4	Martin Laursen	(yellow card) 51'
CB	3	René Henriksen
LB	5	Jan Heintze (c)	(yellow card) 34'	(substituted off) 58'
CM	2	Stig Tøfting
CM	7	Thomas Gravesen
RW	19	Dennis Rommedahl
AM	9	Jon Dahl Tomasson
LW	8	Jesper Grønkjær		(substituted off) 70'
CF	11	Ebbe Sand		(substituted off) 89'
Substitutions:
DF	12	Niclas Jensen		(substituted on) 58'
FW	10	Martin Jørgensen		(substituted on) 70'
MF	17	Christian Poulsen		(substituted on) 89'
Manager:
Morten Olsen

Man of the Match:
Jon Dahl Tomasson (Denmark)

Assistant referees:
Awni Hassouneh (Jordan)
Dramane Dante (Mali)
Fourth official:
Byron Moreno (Ecuador)

=== Denmark vs Senegal ===
6 June 2002
15:30

Denmark	1–1	Senegal
Tomasson 16' (pen.)		Diao 52'

Daegu World Cup Stadium, Daegu
Attendance: 43,500
Referee: Carlos Batres (Guatemala)

Denmark	Senegal

GK	1	Thomas Sørensen
RB	6	Thomas Helveg	(yellow card) 82'
CB	4	Martin Laursen
CB	3	Rene Henriksen
LB	5	Jan Heintze (c)
CM	2	Stig Tøfting
CM	7	Thomas Gravesen		(substituted off) 62'
RW	19	Dennis Rommedahl		(substituted off) 89'
AM	9	Jon Dahl Tomasson	(yellow card) 20'
LW	8	Jesper Grønkjær		(substituted off) 50'
CF	11	Ebbe Sand	(yellow card) 7'
Substitutions:
FW	10	Martin Jørgensen		(substituted on) 50'
MF	17	Christian Poulsen	(yellow card) 84'	(substituted on) 62'
FW	18	Peter Løvenkrands		(substituted on) 89'
Manager:
Morten Olsen

GK	1	Tony Sylva
RB	17	Ferdinand Coly
CB	13	Lamine Diatta
CB	4	Pape Malick Diop (c)
LB	2	Omar Daf
RM	14	Moussa N'Diaye		(substituted off) 46'
CM	3	Pape Sarr		(substituted off) 46'
CM	15	Salif Diao	(yellow card) 62' (red card) 80'
CM	19	Papa Bouba Diop
LM	10	Khalilou Fadiga	(yellow card) 10'
CF	11	El Hadji Diouf
Substitutions:
FW	7	Henri Camara		(substituted on) 46'
FW	9	Souleymane Camara		(substituted on) 46'	(substituted off) 83'
DF	21	Habib Beye			(substituted on) 83'
Manager:
(France) Bruno Metsu

Man of the Match:
Khalilou Fadiga (Senegal)

Assistant referees:
Ferenc Szekely (Hungary)
Visva Krishnan (Singapore)
Fourth official:
Kim Young-Soo (South Korea)

=== France vs Uruguay ===
6 June 2002
20:30

France	0–0	Uruguay

Busan Asiad Main Stadium, Busan
Attendance: 38,289
Referee: Felipe Ramos (Mexico)

France	Uruguay

GK	16	Fabien Barthez
RB	15	Lilian Thuram
CB	18	Frank Leboeuf		(substituted off) 16'
CB	8	Marcel Desailly (c)
LB	3	Bixente Lizarazu
CM	4	Patrick Vieira
CM	17	Emmanuel Petit	(yellow card) 45+2'
RW	11	Sylvain Wiltord		(substituted off) 90+3'
AM	22	Johan Micoud
LW	12	Thierry Henry	(red card) 25'
CF	20	David Trezeguet		(substituted off) 81'
Substitutions:
DF	2	Vincent Candela		(substituted on) 16'
FW	9	Djibril Cissé		(substituted on) 81'
FW	21	Christophe Dugarry		(substituted on) 90+3'
Manager:
Roger Lemerre

GK	1	Fabián Carini
RB	3	Alejandro Lembo
CB	4	Paolo Montero (c)
CB	14	Gonzalo Sorondo
LB	6	Darío Rodríguez		(substituted off) 73'
RM	8	Gustavo Varela
CM	5	Pablo García	(yellow card) 11'
LM	16	Marcelo Romero	(yellow card) 45+3'	(substituted off) 71'
AM	20	Álvaro Recoba
CF	9	Darío Silva	(yellow card) 47'	(substituted off) 60'
CF	13	Sebastián Abreu	(yellow card) 45+2'
Substitutions:
FW	11	Federico Magallanes		(substituted on) 60'
MF	22	Gonzalo de los Santos		(substituted on) 71'
MF	7	Gianni Guigou		(substituted on) 73'
Manager:
Víctor Púa

Man of the Match:
Fabien Barthez (France)

Assistant referees:
Vladimir Fernández (El Salvador)
Curtis Charles (Antigua and Barbuda)
Fourth official:
Urs Meier (Switzerland)

=== Denmark vs France ===
11 June 2002
15:30

Denmark	2–0	France
Rommedahl 22'; Tomasson 67'

Incheon World Cup Stadium, Incheon
Attendance: 48,100
Referee: Vítor Melo Pereira (Portugal)

Denmark	France

GK	1	Thomas Sørensen
RB	6	Thomas Helveg
CB	4	Martin Laursen
CB	3	Rene Henriksen (c)
LB	12	Niclas Jensen	(yellow card) 71'
CM	2	Stig Tøfting		(substituted off) 79'
CM	17	Christian Poulsen	(yellow card) 27'	(substituted off) 76'
CM	7	Thomas Gravesen
RW	19	Dennis Rommedahl
LW	10	Martin Jørgensen		(substituted off) 46'
CF	9	Jon Dahl Tomasson
Substitutions:
FW	8	Jesper Grønkjær		(substituted on) 46'
DF	20	Kasper Bøgelund		(substituted on) 76'
MF	23	Brian Steen Nielsen		(substituted on) 79'
Manager:
Morten Olsen

GK	16	Fabien Barthez
RB	2	Vincent Candela
CB	15	Lilian Thuram
CB	8	Marcel Desailly (c)
LB	3	Bixente Lizarazu
CM	4	Patrick Vieira		(substituted off) 71'
CM	7	Claude Makélélé
RW	11	Sylvain Wiltord		(substituted off) 83'
AM	10	Zinedine Zidane
LW	21	Christophe Dugarry	(yellow card) 8'	(substituted off) 54'
CF	20	David Trezeguet
Substitutions:
FW	9	Djibril Cissé		(substituted on) 54'
MF	22	Johan Micoud		(substituted on) 71'
MF	6	Youri Djorkaeff		(substituted on) 83'
Manager:
Roger Lemerre

Man of the Match:
Zinedine Zidane (France)

Assistant referees:
Carlos Matos (Portugal)
Elise Doriri (Vanuatu)
Fourth official:
Ľuboš Micheľ (Slovakia)

=== Senegal vs Uruguay ===
11 June 2002
15:30

Senegal	3–3	Uruguay
Fadiga 20' (pen.); Bouba Diop 26', 38'		Morales 46'; Forlán 69'; Recoba 88' (pen.)

Suwon World Cup Stadium, Suwon
Attendance: 33,681
Referee: Jan Wegereef (Netherlands)

Senegal	Uruguay

GK	1	Tony Sylva
RB	17	Ferdinand Coly	(yellow card) 39'	(substituted off) 63'
CB	13	Lamine Diatta
CB	4	Pape Malick Diop
LB	2	Omar Daf	(yellow card) 4'
RM	19	Papa Bouba Diop	(yellow card) 69'
CM	6	Aliou Cissé (c)
CM	5	Alassane N'Dour		(substituted off) 76'
LM	10	Khalilou Fadiga	(yellow card) 87'
CF	7	Henri Camara	(yellow card) 2'	(substituted off) 67'
CF	11	El Hadji Diouf	(yellow card) 82'
Substitutions:
DF	21	Habib Beye	(yellow card) 87'	(substituted on) 63'
MF	14	Moussa N'Diaye		(substituted on) 67'
MF	12	Amdy Faye		(substituted on) 76'
Manager:
(France) Bruno Metsu

GK	1	Fabián Carini	(yellow card) 19'
RB	3	Alejandro Lembo
CB	4	Paolo Montero (c)	(yellow card) 82'
CB	14	Gonzalo Sorondo		(substituted off) 32'
LB	8	Gustavo Varela
RM	16	Marcelo Romero	(yellow card) 8'	(substituted off) 46'
CM	5	Pablo García	(yellow card) 35'
LM	6	Darío Rodríguez	(yellow card) 40'
AM	20	Álvaro Recoba
CF	9	Darío Silva
CF	13	Sebastián Abreu		(substituted off) 46'
Substitutions:
FW	17	Mario Regueiro		(substituted on) 32'
FW	18	Richard Morales		(substituted on) 46'
FW	21	Diego Forlán		(substituted on) 46'
Manager:
Víctor Púa

Man of the Match:
Papa Bouba Diop (Senegal)

Assistant referees:
Jaap Pool (Netherlands)
Ferenc Szekely (Hungary)
Fourth official:
Kyros Vassaras (Greece)

== See also ==
- Denmark at the FIFA World Cup
- France at the FIFA World Cup
- Senegal at the FIFA World Cup
- Uruguay at the FIFA World Cup
