= 2002 FIFA World Cup qualification (OFC–CONMEBOL play-off) =

2002 FIFA World Cup qualification (CONMEBOL–OFC play-off)
- Event: 2002 FIFA World Cup qualification
Australia	Uruguay
(Australia)	(Uruguay)
1	3
- (on aggregate)

First leg
Australia	Uruguay
1	0
- Date: 20 November 2001
- Venue: MCG, Melbourne
- Referee: Graziano Cesari (Italy)
- Attendance: 84,656
- Weather: Partly cloudy 15 °C (59 °F)

Second leg
Uruguay	Australia
3	0
- Date: 25 November 2001
- Venue: Estadio Centenario, Montevideo
- Referee: Ali Bujsaim (UAE)
- Attendance: 62,000
- Weather: Clear; 16 °C (61 °F)

The 2002 FIFA World Cup OFC–CONMEBOL qualification play-off was a two-legged home-and-away tie between the winners of the Oceania qualifying tournament, Australia, and the fifth-placed team from the South American qualifying tournament, Uruguay. The games were played on 20 November and 25 November 2001 in Melbourne and Montevideo respectively. Australia was hoping to play in the FIFA World Cup for the first time since 1974 and Uruguay since 1990.

In the first leg, Australia beat Uruguay 1–0 in Melbourne while Uruguay took revenge in the second leg, easily defeating Australia 3–0 in Montevideo. Uruguay won the series 3–1 on aggregate, therefore qualifying for the World Cup held in Korea and Japan.

Australian players were spited, punched and abused by a mob of Uruguayan fans on arrival at Montevideo's international airport for the second leg.

== Venues ==
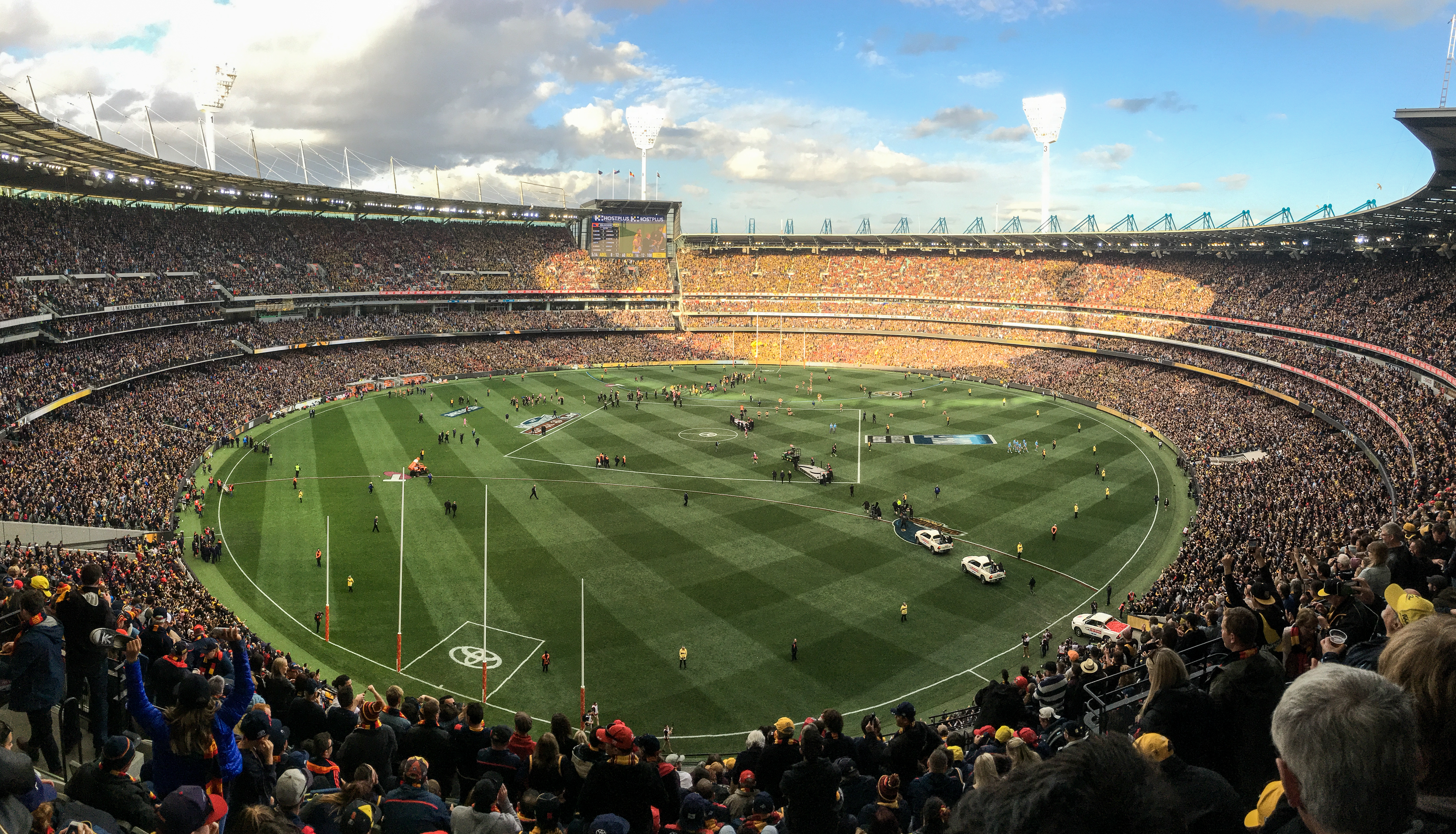
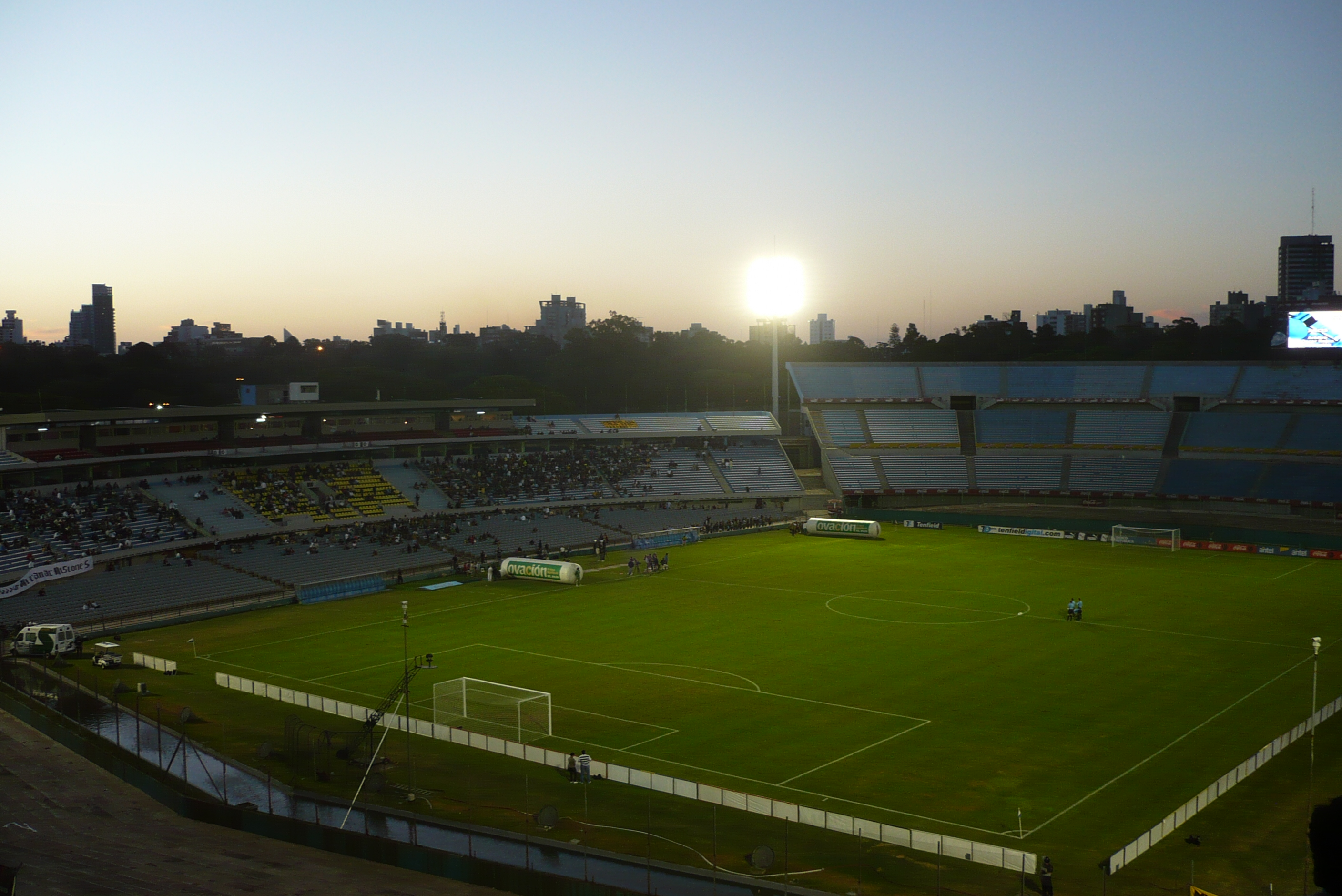
Melbourne Cricket Ground (left) and Estadio Centenario, venues for the series

== Background ==
Uruguay
Round
Australia

Team	Pld	W	D	L	GF	GA	GD	Pts
Argentina	18	13	4	1	42	15	27	43
Ecuador	18	9	4	5	23	20	3	31
Brazil	18	9	3	6	31	17	14	30
Paraguay	18	9	3	6	29	23	6	30
Uruguay	18	7	6	5	19	13	6	27

Final standings

Team	Pld	W	D	L	GF	GA	GD	Pts
Australia	4	4	0	0	66	0	66	12
Fiji	4	3	0	1	27	4	23	9
Tonga	4	2	0	2	7	30	−23	6
Samoa	4	1	0	3	9	18	−9	3
American Samoa	4	0	0	4	0	57	−57	0

Final round
(OFC)
Opponent
Result

1st leg
New Zealand (A)
2–0

2nd leg
New Zealand (H)
4–1

== Match details ==
=== First leg ===
20 November 2001
20:15 UTC+11
First leg

Australia	1–0	Uruguay
Muscat 78' (pen.)	(Report)

MCG, Melbourne
Attendance: 84,656
Referee: Graziano Cesari (Italy)

Australia
Uruguay

GK	1	Mark Schwarzer
RB	4	Paul Okon (c)
CB	2	Kevin Muscat	(yellow card) 85'
CB	14	Shaun Murphy
LB	5	Tony Vidmar
DM	3	Craig Moore
RM	7	Brett Emerton
CM	8	Josip Skoko
LM	11	Stan Lazaridis		(substituted off) 46'
SS	10	Harry Kewell
CF	9	Mark Viduka
Substitutions:
GK	12	Zeljko Kalac
DF	6	Tony Popovic
DF	16	Steve Horvat
MF	13	Mark Bresciano
MF	17	Steve Corica
FW	18	Paul Agostino		(substituted on) 46'
FW	21	John Aloisi
Manager:
Frank Farina

GK	1	Fabián Carini
RB	2	Washington Tais
CB	3	Alejandro Lembo
CB	4	Paolo Montero (c)
LB	6	Darío Rodríguez	(yellow card) 34'
CM	7	Gianni Guigou
CM	8	Gonzalo de los Santos
CM	5	Pablo García
AM	20	Álvaro Recoba
CF	19	Javier Chevantón		(substituted off) 77'
CF	11	Federico Magallanes		(substituted off) 71'
Substitutions:
GK	12	Gustavo Munúa
DF	14	Joe Bizera
MF	16	Guillermo Giacomazzi		(substituted on) 71'
FW	9	Diego Alonso
FW	10	Nicolás Olivera
FW	15	Mario Regueiro		(substituted on) 77'
FW	18	Richard Morales
Manager:
Víctor Púa

OFFICIALS

- Assistant referees:
  - Marco Ivaldi (Italy)
  - Aniello Di Mauro (Italy)
- Fourth official: Cosimo Bolognino (Italy)

MATCH RULES

- 90 minutes
- 3 (of 7) substitutions permitted

=== Second leg ===
25 November 2001
16:00 UTC−3
Second leg

Uruguay	3–0	Australia
Silva 14'; Morales 70', 90'	(Report)

Estadio Centenario, Montevideo
Attendance: 62,000
Referee: Ali Bujsaim (UAE)

Uruguay
Australia

GK	1	Fabián Carini	(yellow card) 90+3'
RB	2	Washington Tais	(yellow card) 85'
CB	3	Alejandro Lembo
CB	4	Paolo Montero (c)
LB	6	Darío Rodríguez
CM	7	Gianni Guigou
CM	5	Pablo García	(yellow card) 66'
RW	9	Darío Silva	(yellow card) 81'	(substituted off) 81'
AM	20	Álvaro Recoba
LW	10	Mario Regueiro	(yellow card) 10'	(substituted off) 64'
CF	11	Federico Magallanes		(substituted off) 65'
Substitutions:
GK	12	Gustavo Munúa
DF	14	Gonzalo Sorondo		(substituted on) 81'
MF	8	Gonzalo de los Santos		(substituted on) 64' (yellow card) 80'
MF	15	Guillermo Giacomazzi
FW	16	Nicolás Olivera
FW	18	Richard Morales		(substituted on) 65' (yellow card) 70'
FW	19	Diego Alonso
Manager:
Víctor Púa

GK	1	Mark Schwarzer
RB	4	Paul Okon (c)
CB	2	Kevin Muscat	(yellow card) 32'	(substituted off) 73'
CB	14	Shaun Murphy		(substituted off) 81'
LB	5	Tony Vidmar
DM	3	Craig Moore
RM	7	Brett Emerton
CM	8	Josip Skoko
LM	11	Stan Lazaridis
SS	10	Harry Kewell
CF	9	Mark Viduka
Substitutions:
GK	12	Zeljko Kalac
DF	16	Steve Horvat
MF	13	Mark Bresciano
MF	17	Steve Corica
MF	22	Mile Sterjovski
FW	18	Paul Agostino		(substituted on) 73'
FW	21	John Aloisi		(substituted on) 81'
Manager:
Frank Farina

OFFICIALS

- Assistant referees:
  - Ahmed Yaqqob Mohamed (UAE)
  - Ali Abdulla Makhlouf (UAE)
- Fourth official: Musallam Al Bloushi (UAE)

MATCH RULES

- 90 minutes
- 30 minutes of extra-time if necessary
- Penalty shoot-out if scores still level:
- 3 (of 7) substitutions permitted

== Aftermath ==
Uruguay qualified for the 2002 FIFA World Cup Finals in South Korea and Japan, and were drawn into Group A with defending champions France, Denmark and debutants Senegal. After losing 2–1 to Denmark in their opening match, Uruguay drew France 0–0 and in the final match they also drew 3–3 to Senegal despite being 3–0 down, finishing third in the group on two points.

Australia qualified automatically for the 2002 OFC Nations Cup, being drawn into a group with Vanuatu, Fiji and New Caledonia and winning 2–0, 11–0 and 8–0 respectively. In the semi-finals against Tahiti, the Socceroos had to rely on a golden goal from Damian Mori in extra time to secure a 2–1 win and progression to the final against New Zealand, where they lost 1–0. New Zealand qualified for the 2003 FIFA Confederations Cup.

Australia and Uruguay met again in the 2005 CONMEBOL-OFC play-off, with heightened security measures following the 2001 airport incident in Montevideo. This time, however, Australia came out victorious.
