= 2005 Australia national soccer team season =

Australia
2005 season
- Manager: Frank Farina; Guus Hiddink

This page summarises the Australia national soccer team fixtures and results in 2005.

== Summary ==
2005 saw the Australian national football team playing twelve senior matches in what proved to be a definitive season for the history of the men's senior national side. The games included participating in the 2005 FIFA Confederations Cup in Germany and a dramatic end to a 32-year absence from the FIFA World Cup by qualifying, via a penalty shoot-out for the 2006 FIFA World Cup.

After six years in charge of the Australian side, a disappointing 2005 FIFA Confederations Cup campaign saw coach Frank Farina replaced by the more experienced Dutchman Guus Hiddink, who was appointed to qualify Australia for the World Cup finals, and take them through that campaign should they succeed.

== Record ==
Type	GP	W	D	L	GF	GA
Friendly matches	5	4	1	0	12	2
Confederations Cup	3	0	0	3	5	10
World Cup qualifiers	4	3	0	1	10	2
Total	12	7	1	4	27	14

== Match results ==
=== Friendlies ===
9 February Friendly	South Africa	1–1	Australia	Durban, South Africa
	McCarthy 12'		71' Chipperfield	Stadium: Kings Park Stadium; Referee: Lim Kee Chong (Mauritius)

26 March Friendly	Australia	2–1	Iraq	Sydney, Australia
	Bresciano 22'; Elrich 72'		11' Nasser	Stadium: Telstra Stadium; Attendance: 30,258; Referee: Peter O'Leary (New Zealand)

29 March Friendly	Australia	3–0	Indonesia	Perth, Australia
	Milicic 24', 57'; Zdrilic 85'			Stadium: Subiaco Oval; Attendance: 13,719; Referee: Hirofumi Yamanishi (Japan)

9 June Friendly	Australia	1–0	New Zealand	London, England
	Colosimo 85'			Stadium: Craven Cottage; Attendance: 9,023; Referee: Mike Dean (England)

9 October Friendly	Australia	5–0	Jamaica	London, England
	Bresciano 3'; Thompson 29'; Viduka 48'; Aloisi 58'; Griffiths 85'			Stadium: Craven Cottage; Attendance: 6,570; Referee: Mike Riley (England)

=== 2005 FIFA Confederations Cup ===
16 June Group Stage	Germany	4–3	Australia	Frankfurt, Germany
21:00 CEST	Kurányi 17'; Mertesacker 23'; Ballack 60' (pen.); Podolski 88'		21' Skoko; 31', 90+2' Aloisi	Stadium: Waldstadion; Attendance: 46,466; Referee: Carlos Amarilla (Paraguay)

18 June Group Stage	Australia	2–4	Argentina	Nuremberg, Germany
20:45 CEST	Aloisi 61' (pen.), 70'		12', 53', 89' Figueroa; 31' (pen.) Riquelme	Stadium: Frankenstadion; Attendance: 25,218; Referee: Shamsul Maidin (Singapore)

21 June Group Stage	Australia	0–2	Tunisia	Leipzig, Germany
20:45 CEST			26', 70' Santos	Stadium: Zentralstadion; Referee: Carlos Chandía (Chile)

=== 2006 FIFA World Cup qualification ===
3 September Final round	Australia	7–0	Solomon Islands	Sydney, Australia
	Culina 20'; Viduka 36', 43'; Cahill 57'; Chipperfield 64'; Thompson 68'; Emerton 89'			Stadium: Sydney Football Stadium; Attendance: 16,000; Referee: Subkhiddin Mohd Salleh (Malaysia)

6 September Final round	Solomon Islands	1–2	Australia	Honiara, Solomon Islands
	Fa'arodo 49'		19' Thompson; 58' Emerton	Stadium: Lawson Tama Stadium; Attendance: 16,000; Referee: Shamsul Maidin (Singapore)

12 November Play-off	Uruguay	1–0	Australia	Montevideo, Uruguay
	Rodríguez 37'	(Report)		Stadium: Estadio Centenario; Attendance: 55,000; Referee: Claus Bo Larsen (Denmark)

16 November Play-off	Australia	1–0 (a.e.t.) (1–1 on aggregate) (4–2 p)	Uruguay	Sydney, Australia
	Bresciano 35'	(Report)		Stadium: Telstra Stadium; Attendance: 82,698; Referee: Luis Medina Cantalejo (Spain)
	Penalties
	Kewell (penalty scored); Neill (penalty scored); Vidmar (penalty scored); Viduka (penalty missed); Aloisi (penalty scored)		(penalty missed) Rodríguez; (penalty scored) Varela; (penalty scored) Estoyanoff; (penalty missed) Zalayeta

The aggregate score for the two legs against Uruguay was tied 1–1 and, since the away goals rule could not be applied, the play-off was decided on a penalty shoot-out. Australia qualified after winning 4–2.

== Goal scorers ==
Player	Friendlies	FIFA Confederations Cup	FIFA World Cup qual.	Total goals
Aloisi	1	4	-	5
Bresciano	2	-	1	3
Thompson	1	-	2	3
Viduka	1	-	2	3
Chipperfield	1	-	1	2
Emerton	-	-	2	2
Milicic	2	-	-	2
Cahill	-	-	1	1
Colosimo	1	-	-	1
Culina	-	-	1	1
Elrich	1	-	-	1
Griffiths	1	-	-	1
Skoko	-	1	-	1
Zdrilic	1	-	-	1
