= 2006 FIFA World Cup qualification (CONMEBOL–OFC play-off) =

- Event: 2006 FIFA World Cup qualification
Uruguay	Australia
(Uruguay)	(Australia)
1	1
- (on aggregate; Australia won 4–2 on penalties)

First leg
Uruguay	Australia
1	0
- Date: 12 November 2005
- Venue: Estadio Centenario, Montevideo
- Referee: Claus Bo Larsen (Denmark)
- Attendance: 55,000
- Weather: Clear; 22 °C (72 °F)

Second leg
Australia	Uruguay
1	0
- Date: 16 November 2005
- Venue: Telstra Stadium, Sydney
- Referee: Luis Medina Cantalejo (Spain)
- Attendance: 82,698
- Weather: Mostly cloudy 17 °C (63 °F)

The 2006 FIFA World Cup CONMEBOL–OFC qualification play-off was a two-legged home-and-away tie between the winners of the Oceania qualifying tournament, Australia, and the fifth-placed team from the South American qualifying tournament, Uruguay.

After winning the series, Australia qualified for the 2006 FIFA World Cup held in Germany.

== Background ==
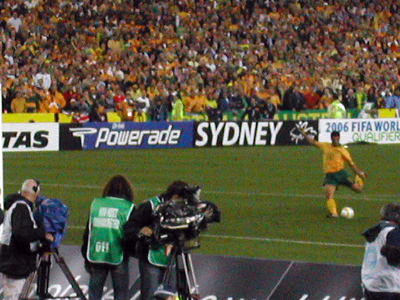
John Aloisi taking the decisive penalty

The games were played on 12 and 16 November 2005 in Montevideo and Sydney respectively. With the home team winning 1–0 in both matches, the aggregate score was tied 1–1, and, with no away goal advantage, the play-off was decided by a penalty shoot-out, which Australia won 4–2 in order to qualify for the FIFA World Cup for the first time since the 1974 tournament.

It was the second consecutive FIFA World Cup where the two sides had played each other for a place in the tournament. On the first occasion in 2001, Uruguay won 3–1 on aggregate. The draw for determining the order of the home and away legs was made at a FIFA congress on 10 September 2005.

== Venues ==
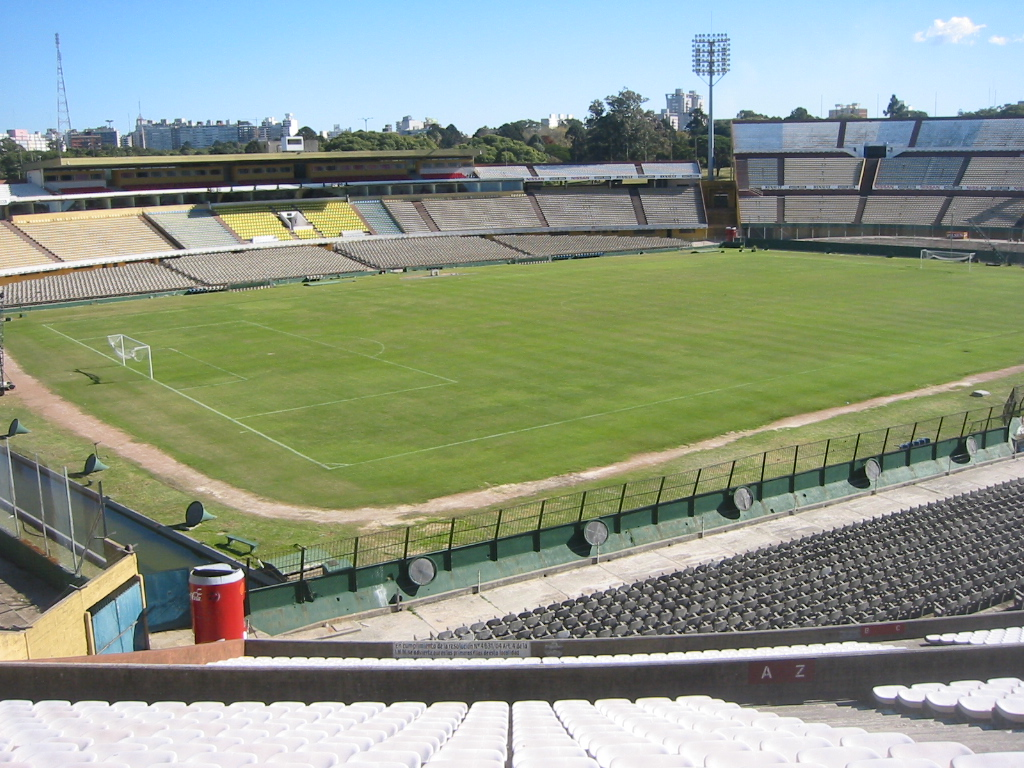
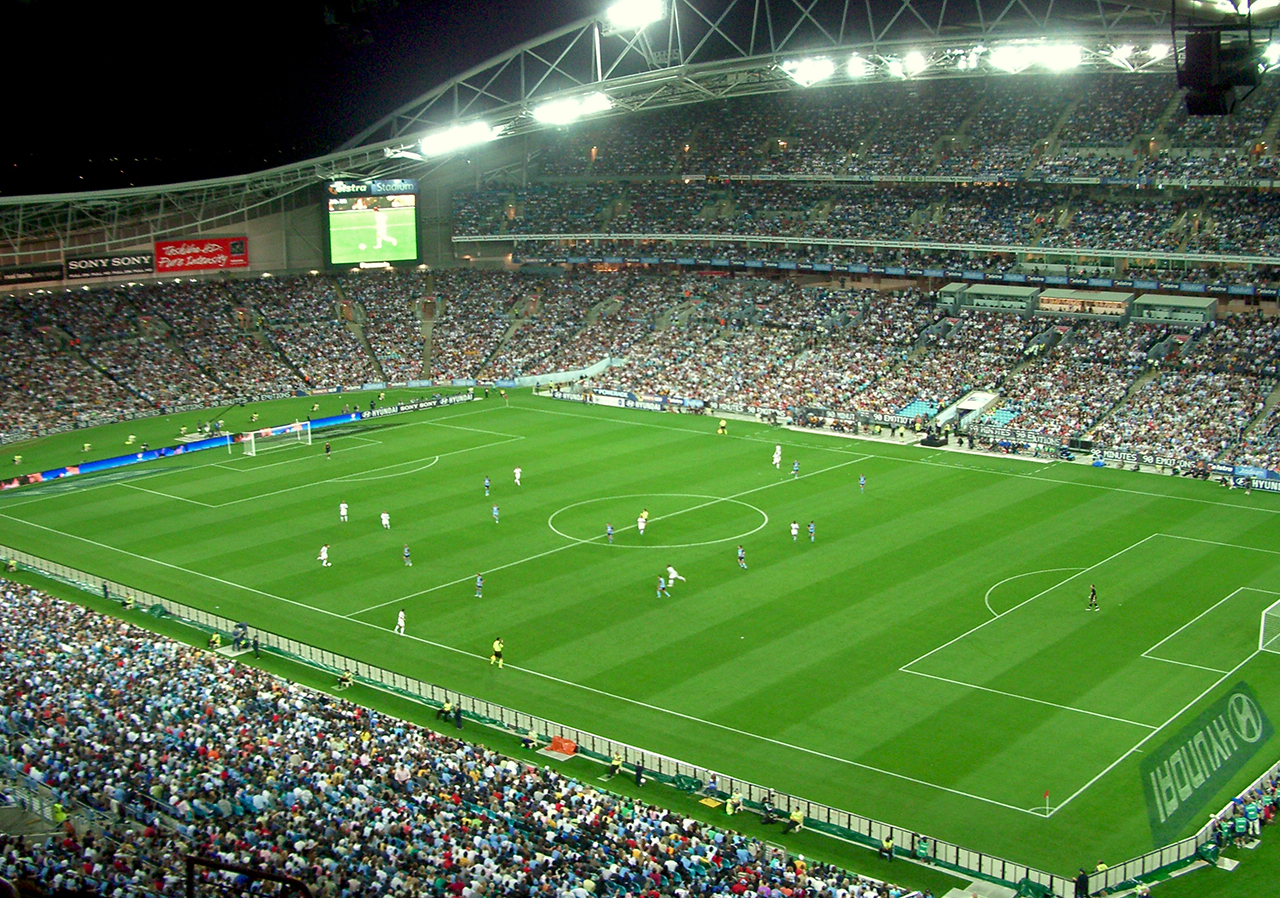
Estadio Centenario (left) and Telstra Stadium, venues for the series

== Background ==
Uruguay
Round
Australia

Pos	Team	Pld	Pts
3	Ecuador	18	28
4	Paraguay	18	28
5	Uruguay	18	25
6	Colombia	18	24
7	Chile	18	22

Final standings

Pos	Team	Pld	Pts
1	Australia	5	13
2	Solomon Islands	5	10
3	New Zealand	5	9
4	Fiji	5	4
5	Tahiti	5	4
6	Vanuatu	5	3

Final round
(OFC)
Opponent
Result

1st leg
Solomon Islands (H)
7–0

2nd leg
Solomon Islands (A)
2–1

== Match details ==
=== First leg ===
12 November 2005
18:00 UTC−2
First leg

Uruguay	1–0	Australia
D. Rodríguez 37'	Report

Estadio Centenario, Montevideo
Attendance: 55,000
Referee: Claus Bo Larsen (Denmark)

Uruguay
Australia

GK	1	Fabián Carini
DF	6	Diego López
DF	4	Paolo Montero (c)
DF	3	Darío Rodríguez	(yellow card) 90+1'
MF	8	Carlos Diogo		(substituted off) 64'
MF	5	Pablo García
MF	15	Diego Pérez
MF	21	Diego Forlán		(substituted off) 19'
MF	9	Álvaro Recoba
FW	17	Marcelo Zalayeta		(substituted off) 64'
FW	18	Richard Morales
Substitutions:
GK	12	Sebastián Viera
DF	2	Guillermo Rodríguez		(substituted on) 64'
MF	7	Marcelo Sosa
MF	20	Martín Parodi
FW	10	Darío Silva	(yellow card) 24'	(substituted on) 19'
FW	11	Mario Regueiro
FW	13	Fabián Estoyanoff		(substituted on) 64'
Manager:
Jorge Fossati

GK	1	Mark Schwarzer
DF	5	Tony Vidmar
DF	2	Lucas Neill
DF	6	Tony Popovic
MF	7	Brett Emerton
MF	19	Jason Culina
MF	3	Scott Chipperfield
MF	13	Vince Grella	(yellow card) 90+1'
MF	10	Harry Kewell
FW	14	Archie Thompson		(substituted off) 52'
FW	9	Mark Viduka (c)		(substituted off) 80'
Substitutions:
GK	18	Željko Kalac
DF	12	Ljubo Miličević
MF	4	Tim Cahill
MF	8	Josip Skoko
MF	20	Luke Wilkshire
MF	23	Mark Bresciano		(substituted on) 52'
FW	15	John Aloisi		(substituted on) 80'
Manager:
(Netherlands) Guus Hiddink

OFFICIALS

- Assistant referees:
  - Bill Hansen (Denmark)
  - Anders Norrestrand (Denmark)
- Fourth official: Nicolai Vollquartz (Denmark)

MATCH RULES

- 90 minutes
- 3 (of 7) substitutions permitted

=== Second leg ===
16 November 2005
20:00 UTC+11
Second leg

Australia	1–0 (a.e.t.)	Uruguay
Bresciano 35'	Report
Penalties
Kewell (penalty scored); Neill (penalty scored); Vidmar (penalty scored); Viduka (penalty missed); Aloisi (penalty scored)	4–2	(penalty missed) D. Rodríguez; (penalty scored) Varela; (penalty scored) Estoyanoff; (penalty missed) Zalayeta

Telstra Stadium, Sydney
Attendance: 82,698
Referee: Luis Medina Cantalejo (Spain)

Australia
Uruguay

GK	1	Mark Schwarzer
DF	2	Lucas Neill
DF	6	Tony Popovic	(yellow card) 27'	(substituted off) 31'
DF	5	Tony Vidmar	(yellow card) 39'
MF	23	Mark Bresciano		(substituted off) 96'
MF	4	Tim Cahill
MF	3	Scott Chipperfield
MF	19	Jason Culina	(yellow card) 53'
MF	7	Brett Emerton		(substituted off) 110'
MF	13	Vince Grella
FW	9	Mark Viduka (c)
Substitutions:
GK	18	Željko Kalac
DF	11	Stan Lazaridis
DF	12	Ljubo Miličević
MF	8	Josip Skoko		(substituted on) 110'
MF	10	Harry Kewell	(yellow card) 86'	(substituted on) 31'
FW	14	Archie Thompson
FW	15	John Aloisi		(substituted on) 96'
Manager:
(Netherlands) Guus Hiddink

GK	1	Fabián Carini
DF	2	Diego Lugano
DF	4	Paolo Montero (c)		(substituted off) 81'
DF	6	Guillermo Rodríguez
DF	3	Darío Rodríguez	(yellow card) 67'
DF	11	Mario Regueiro	(yellow card) 44'	(substituted off) 97'
MF	5	Pablo García	(yellow card) 76'
MF	7	Gustavo Varela
MF	8	Carlos Diogo	(yellow card) 45+1'
MF	9	Álvaro Recoba		(substituted off) 72'
FW	18	Richard Morales	(yellow card) 110'
Substitutions:
GK	12	Sebastián Viera
DF	21	Alejandro Lago
MF	14	Marcelo Sosa		(substituted on) 81'
MF	19	Gonzalo de los Santos
FW	10	Darío Silva
FW	13	Fabián Estoyanoff		(substituted on) 97'
FW	17	Marcelo Zalayeta		(substituted on) 72'
Manager:
Jorge Fossati

OFFICIALS

- Assistant referees:
  - Víctoriano Giráldez Carrasco (Spain)
  - Pedro Medina Hernández (Spain)
- Fourth official: Julián Rodríguez Santiago (Spain)

MATCH RULES

- 90 minutes
- 30 minutes of extra-time if necessary
- Penalty shoot-out if scores still level:
- 3 (of 7) substitutions permitted

== Prelude and Match reports ==
Prior to the first leg in Montevideo, there was controversy over the starting time, with the original start time of 16:00 moved to 21:00 in an attempt to make the Australian team miss their flights to Sydney for the second leg. Australia responded by chartering a flight with their sponsor Qantas, who provided a plane with massage tables, exercise bikes and business class seating for the players. Uruguay then requested an afternoon kick-off time, which was accepted. Australia also requested and was given added security for the first leg, due to their players being abused and spat on when they played their away leg against Uruguay in the 2001 qualifiers.

The first leg was a close affair, with a first half Darío Rodríguez goal the only separation of the two teams. Multiple saves by Australian goalkeeper Mark Schwarzer kept the visiting side in the match, while Uruguayan midfielder Álvaro Recoba was considered unlucky not to score from his freekicks, although one assisted Rodríguez's goal. Diego Forlán was considered unlikely to play in the days leading up to the match due to an injury he picked up in club play. He would be passed fit pre-match, but was subbed off after only 18 minutes. Recoba claimed a penalty in the second half, although it was waved away to furious protests. Australian captain Mark Viduka and midfielder Jason Culina narrowly missed second-half equalisers, with Uruguay winning 1–0, with no away goal for Australia.

Uruguay ultimately suffered for their pre-match antics in changing the kick-off times, as they were forced to fly in economy due to a lack of business class seats once the time was set. A request was made to Football Federation Australia to share their own charter, which was quickly refused. Uruguayan coach Jorge Fossati complained about the referees selected for the second leg, Belgians Frank De Bleeckere, Mark Simons and Peter Hermans. Fossati said Belgium were neighbours of the Netherlands, the home country of Australian coach Guus Hiddink. FIFA appointed a referee team from Spain to replace the Belgians afterwards.

Tensions were high before the second leg, with reports of Recoba stating that Uruguay had a "divine right" to be at the World Cup. A statement he would later deny, and is believed to have been fabricated. Although it would be heavily reported in Australia. The match sold out the 83,000 seat Telstra Stadium, who buoyed by the reports of the statement, as well as reports of the Australian team being abused and spat on in Montevideo in 2001, went against Australian sporting traditions and roundly booed the Uruguayan anthem.

The second leg itself was a physical match, with nine yellow cards handed out. The physicalities beginning before the teams walked out, with Richard Morales and Tony Popovic coming to blows in the tunnel. The first ten minutes went the way of Uruguay, with multiple missed shots, before Australia came into the game. An elbow to the head from Popovic to Recoba earnt him a yellow card in the 27th minute, and he was quickly substituted, bringing on Harry Kewell, a surprise omission from the starting line up. Hiddink claimed to have planned to use Kewell as an early sub, and his plan quickly worked, as Kewell set up Mark Bresciano for Australia's first goal, equalising the play-off. Recoba who had been harangued by the crowd due to the pre-match reports was not at his best, being subbed off in the second half. Uncharacteristic misses from Uruguay's players became a characteristic of the match. Along with players from both teams coming off with injuries.

No goals were scored after Bresciano's strike, and the two teams went into extra time locked at 1–1 on aggregate. Nothing could separate the teams in the 30 minutes of extra time and they were sent to a penalty shoot-out. Although Australia's Brett Emerton coming off with cramp late in extra time, ruined Hiddink's plan to replace Schwarzer with Željko Kalac for the shoot-out.

Kewell was first to take his shot, easily converting his chance. Schwarzer then stopped Rodríguez's effort, to give Australia an early lead. The two sides then swapped successful penalties, until Viduka placed his shot wide to bring Uruguay back into the contest. Schwarzer however made himself a hero with his second save of the shoot-out, stopping Marcelo Zalayeta's effort. John Aloisi then stepped up and placed his shot past Fabián Carini sending Australia to their first World Cup since 1974 and avenging the elimination suffered in 2001.

== Aftermath ==
For Uruguay it was the third FIFA World Cup out of four since 1990 they failed to qualify. Jorge Fossati lost his job and rehired Óscar Tabárez who managed the team before (1988–1990), and Uruguay entered the Proceso era, breaking many records and have qualified for every FIFA World Cup since 2010.

Australia finally won a FIFA World Cup play-off after losing to Scotland (1986), Argentina (1994), Iran (1998) and the first playoff with Uruguay (2002). Australia were drawn into 2006 FIFA World Cup Group F with defending champion Brazil, Croatia, and Japan. They finished second place after Brazil, then were eliminated at Round of 16 against the eventual champion Italy.

== Legacy ==
In 2009, Australian Broadcasting Corporation ranked Australia's victory in 2005 as number one on their list of milestone sporting moments of the 2000s. Melbourne paper the Herald Sun named Australia's victory in 2005 as one of 100 great moments in Australian sports history.

A documentary titled November 16 was released in 2015 to commemorate the 10th anniversary of the second leg. It featured interviews with Álvaro Recoba, Fabián Carini and members of the Australian squad.
