= 2000–01 Empoli FC season =

Empoli
2000–01 season
- Head coach: Silvio Baldini
- Stadium: Stadio Carlo Castellani
- Serie B: 5th
- Coppa Italia: First round
- Top goalscorer: League: Massimo Maccarone (16); All: Massimo Maccarone (16)

The 2000–01 season was the 90th season in the history of Empoli F.C. and the club's second consecutive season in the second division of Italian football. In addition to the domestic league, Empoli participated in this season's edition of the Coppa Italia.

== Competitions ==
=== Overview ===
Competition	First match	Last match	Starting round	Final position	Record							
Competition	First match	Last match	Starting round	Final position	Pld	W	D	L	GF	GA	GD	Win %
Serie B	3 September 2000	10 June 2001	Matchday 1	5th	38	18	10	10	52	43	+9	47.37
Coppa Italia	13 August 2000	20 August 2000	First round	First round	3	1	1	1	8	7	+1	33.33
Total					41	19	11	11	60	50	+10	46.34

Source: Competitions

=== Serie B ===
==== League table ====
Pos	Team	Pld	W	D	L	GF	GA	GD	Pts	Promotion or relegation
3	Chievo (P)	38	19	13	6	54	34	+20	70	Promotion to Serie A
4	Venezia (P)	38	19	12	7	62	43	+19	69	Promotion to Serie A
5	Empoli	38	18	10	10	52	43	+9	64	
6	Sampdoria	38	16	16	6	60	38	+22	64	
7	Ternana	38	16	14	8	59	38	+21	62	

Source: Almanacco Illustrato del Calcio - La Storia 1898-2004, Panini Edizioni, Modena, September 2005
Rules for classification: 1) points; 2) head-to-head points; 3) head-to-head goal difference; 4) head-to-head goals scored; 5) goal difference; 6) number of goals scored.
(P) Promoted

==== Results summary ====
Overall								Home						Away					
Pld	W	D	L	GF	GA	GD	Pts	W	D	L	GF	GA	GD	W	D	L	GF	GA	GD
38	18	10	10	52	43	+9	64	11	4	4	30	21	+9	7	6	6	22	22	0

==== Results by round ====
Round	1	2	3	4	5	6	7	8	9	10	11	12	13	14	15	16	17	18	19	20	21	22	23	24	25	26	27	28	29	30	31	32	33	34	35	36	37	38
Ground	H	A	H	A	H	A	H	H	A	H	A	H	A	H	A	A	H	A	H	A	H	A	H	A	H	A	A	H	A	H	A	H	A	H	H	A	H	A
Result	L	W	D	L	W	W	L	W	L	W	D	W	L	L	D	L	W	L	L	W	W	W	D	L	D	D	W	D	D	W	D	W	W	W	W	W	W	D
Position	17	8	11	14	13	9	12	6	11	8	9	7	9	10	11	12	12	12	13	11	11	11	9	10	11	11	10	10	11	11	11	8	8	8	7	7	6	6

A = Away; H = Home; W = Win; D = Draw; L = Loss

==== Matches ====
3 September 2000 1	Empoli	0–2	Pistoiese	Empoli
CEST (UTC+2)				Stadium: Stadio Carlo Castellani

10 September 2000 2	Pescara	1–3	Empoli	Pescara
CEST (UTC+2)				Stadium: Stadio Adriatico

17 September 2000 3	Empoli	0–0	Genoa	Empoli
CEST (UTC+2)				Stadium: Stadio Carlo Castellani

24 September 2000 4	Ternana	2–0	Empoli	Terni
CEST (UTC+2)				Stadium: Stadio Libero Liberati

1 October 2000 5	Empoli	1–0	Piacenza	Empoli
CEST (UTC+2)				Stadium: Stadio Carlo Castellani

8 October 2000 6	Sampdoria	0–1	Empoli	Genoa
CEST (UTC+2)				Stadium: Stadio Luigi Ferraris

22 October 2000 7	Empoli	0–1	Cosenza	Empoli
CEST (UTC+2)				Stadium: Stadio Carlo Castellani

27 October 2000 8	Empoli	3–2	Ravenna	Empoli
CEST (UTC+2)				Stadium: Stadio Carlo Castellani

1 November 2000 9	Chievo	1–0	Empoli	Verona
CEST (UTC+2)				Stadium: Stadio Marcantonio Bentegodi

5 November 2000 10	Empoli	2–1	Treviso	Empoli
CEST (UTC+2)				Stadium: Stadio Carlo Castellani

12 November 2000 11	Cittadella	2–2	Empoli	Cittadella
CEST (UTC+2)				Stadium: Stadio Euganeo

17 November 2000 12	Empoli	2–0	Siena	Empoli
CEST (UTC+2)				Stadium: Stadio Carlo Castellani

26 November 2000 13	Crotone	3–1	Empoli	Crotone
CEST (UTC+2)				Stadium: Stadio Ezio Scida

3 December 2000 14	Empoli	0–3	Cagliari	Empoli
CEST (UTC+2)				Stadium: Stadio Carlo Castellani

10 December 2000 15	Salernitana	0–0	Empoli	Salerno
CEST (UTC+2)				Stadium: Stadio Arechi

17 December 2000 16	Torino	1–0	Empoli	Turin
CEST (UTC+2)				Stadium: Stadio delle Alpi

23 December 2000 17	Empoli	4–2	Monza	Empoli
CEST (UTC+2)				Stadium: Stadio Carlo Castellani

15 January 2001 18	Ancona	1–0	Empoli	Ancona
CEST (UTC+2)				Stadium: Stadio del Conero

21 January 2001 19	Empoli	2–3	Venezia	Empoli
CEST (UTC+2)				Stadium: Stadio Carlo Castellani

29 January 2001 20	Pistoiese	1–2	Empoli	Pistoia
CEST (UTC+2)				Stadium: Stadio Comunale

4 February 2001 21	Empoli	2–1	Pescara	Empoli
CEST (UTC+2)				Stadium: Stadio Carlo Castellani

11 February 2001 22	Genoa	1–2	Empoli	Genoa
CEST (UTC+2)				Stadium: Stadio Luigi Ferraris

19 February 2001 23	Empoli	0–0	Ternana	Empoli
CEST (UTC+2)				Stadium: Stadio Carlo Castellani

25 February 2001 24	Piacenza	2–0	Empoli	Piacenza
CEST (UTC+2)				Stadium: Stadio Leonardo Garilli

2 March 2001 25	Empoli	0–0	Sampdoria	Empoli
CEST (UTC+2)				Stadium: Stadio Carlo Castellani

11 March 2001 26	Cosenza	1–1	Empoli	Cosenza
CEST (UTC+2)				Stadium: Stadio San Vito

18 March 2001 27	Ravenna	0–2	Empoli	Ravenna
CEST (UTC+2)				Stadium: Stadio Bruno Benelli

26 March 2001 28	Empoli	1–1	Chievo	Empoli
CEST (UTC+2)				Stadium: Stadio Carlo Castellani

8 April 2001 30	Empoli	2–0	Cittadella	Empoli
CEST (UTC+2)				Stadium: Stadio Carlo Castellani

14 April 2001 31	Siena	1–1	Empoli	Florence
CEST (UTC+2)				Stadium: Stadio Artemio Franchi

20 April 2001 32	Empoli	4–2	Crotone	Empoli
CEST (UTC+2)				Stadium: Stadio Carlo Castellani

27 April 2001 33	Cagliari	2–3	Empoli	Cagliari
CEST (UTC+2)				Stadium: Stadio Sant'Elia

3 May 2001 29	Treviso	1–1	Empoli	Treviso
CEST (UTC+2)				Stadium: Stadio Omobono Tenni

12 May 2001 34	Empoli	2–1	Salernitana	Empoli
CEST (UTC+2)				Stadium: Stadio Carlo Castellani

20 May 2001 35	Empoli	2–1	Torino	Empoli
CEST (UTC+2)				Stadium: Stadio Carlo Castellani

27 May 2001 36	Monza	0–1	Empoli	Monza
CEST (UTC+2)				Stadium: Stadio Brianteo

3 June 2001 37	Empoli	3–1	Ancona	Empoli
CEST (UTC+2)				Stadium: Stadio Carlo Castellani

10 June 2001 38	Venezia	2–2	Empoli	Venice
CEST (UTC+2)				Stadium: Stadio Pier Luigi Penzo

=== Coppa Italia ===
==== First round ====
13 August 2000 1	Crotone	1–3	Empoli	Crotone
19:45 CEST (UTC+2)				Stadium: Stadio Ezio Scida

17 August 2000 2	Empoli	2–2	Fermana	Empoli
19:30 CEST (UTC+2)				Stadium: Stadio Carlo Castellani

20 August 2000 3	Sampdoria	4–3	Empoli	Genoa
19:45 CEST (UTC+2)				Stadium: Stadio Luigi Ferraris

== Statistics ==
=== Appearances and goals ===
No.	Pos	Nat	Player	Total		Serie A		Coppa Italia	
No.	Pos	Nat	Player	Apps	Goals	Apps	Goals	Apps	Goals
Goalkeepers
1	GK	(Italy) ITA	Gianluca Berti	0	0	0	0	0	0
1	GK	(Italy) ITA	Massimo Gazzoli	0	0	0	0	0	0
1	GK	(Italy) ITA	Christian Bini	0	0	0	0	0	0
Defenders
1	DF	(Brazil) BRA	Cribari	0	0	0	0	0	0
1	DF	(Italy) ITA	Daniele Baldini	0	0	0	0	0	0
1	DF	(Italy) ITA	Stefano Bianconi	0	0	0	0	0	0
1	DF	(Italy) ITA	Pietro Fusco	0	0	0	0	0	0
1	DF	(Italy) ITA	Roberto Mirri	0	0	0	0	0	0
1	DF	(Italy) ITA	Manuel Belleri	0	0	0	0	0	0
1	DF	(Italy) ITA	Andrea Cupi	0	0	0	0	0	0
Midfielders
1	MF	(Italy) ITA	Riccardo Allegretti	0	0	0	0	0	0
1	MF	(Italy) ITA	Alessandro Pane	0	0	0	0	0	0
1	MF	(Italy) ITA	Francesco D'Aniello	0	0	0	0	0	0
1	MF	(Italy) ITA	Fabrizio Ficini	0	0	0	0	0	0
1	MF	(Italy) ITA	Marco Barollo	0	0	0	0	0	0
1	MF	(Italy) ITA	Flavio Giampieretti	0	0	0	0	0	0
1	MF	(Italy) ITA	Gianluca Porro	0	0	0	0	0	0
1	MF	(Italy) ITA	Vincenzo Iacopino	0	0	0	0	0	0
1	MF	(Italy) ITA	Marco Marchionni	0	0	0	0	0	0
1	MF	(Australia) AUS	Mark Bresciano	31	6	30	5	1	1
Forwards
1	FW	(Italy) ITA	Massimiliano Cappellini	0	0	0	0	0	0
1	FW	(Croatia) CRO	Igor Budan	0	0	0	0	0	0
1	FW	(Italy) ITA	Giacomo Banchelli	0	0	0	0	0	0
1	FW	(Italy) ITA	Antonio Di Natale	38	10	35	9	3	1
1	FW	(Italy) ITA	Massimo Maccarone	0	0	0	0	0	0

Source: Competitions
