= List of Australian television ratings for 2001 =

The Australian television landscape had changed significantly by the end of 2001, with television ratings data switching suppliers, from The Nielsen Company (formerly, Ac.Nielsen) to industry owned, OzTam, which would be the sole provider of weekly ratings and yearly television archives to present day. The Nielson company was instead relegated to ratings of regional areas and PayTV (which at the time, was at its infancy). Moreover, in 2001, Seven Network ended its 46-year-association with the Australian Football League (AFL) despite being a considerable ratings success for the network, the program would ultimately be broadcast by Network Ten for the following 10 years, eventually reverting to the Seven Network in 2012.

The following is a list of Australian television ratings for the year 2001.

== Most Watched Broadcasts in 2001 ==
Rank	Broadcast	Genre	Origin	Date	Network	Audience	Ref.
1	Wimbledon Championships (Men's Singles Finale)	Sport	(United Kingdom)	9 July 2001	9	3,036,000
2	Big Brother Australia (Final Eviction)	Reality	(Australia)	16 July 2001	10	2,789,000
3	Big Brother Australia (Sunday Eviction)	Reality	(Australia)	15 July 2001	10	2,616,000
4	2001 AFL Grand Final	Sport	(Australia)	29 September 2001	7	2,604,000
5	Friends	Sitcom	(United States)	6 August 2001	9	2,541,000
6	World Aquatics Championship (Day 8 Finals)	Sport	(Japan)	29 July 2001	9	2,507,000
7	43rd Annual TV Week Logie Awards	Award show	(Australia)	22 April 2001	9	2,409,000
8	60 Minutes Australia (September 11 Attacks Special)	News	(Australia)	16 September 2001	9	2,340,000
9	Backyard Blitz	Reality	(Australia)	27 May 2001	9	2,324,000
10	Backyard Blitz	Reality	(Australia)	29 April 2001	9	2,298,000
11	Survivor: The Australian Outback (The Final Vote)	Reality	(United States)	4 May 2001	9	2,257,000
12	Popstars Australia	Reality	(Australia)	25 March 2001	7	2,225,000
13	FIFA World Cup (2002 Qualification)	Sport	(Australia)	20 November 2001	7	2,221,000
14	Notting Hill	Film	(United Kingdom) / (United States)	25 November 2001	7	2,221,000
15	Seven News – Saturday Broadcast	News	(Australia)	29 September 2001	7	2,220,000

== See also ==
- Television ratings in Australia
