= 2003 Australia national soccer team season =

Australia
2003 season
- Manager: Frank Farina

This page summarises the Australia men's national soccer team fixtures and results in 2003.

== Summary ==
With no competitive fixtures scheduled, it was a relatively quiet year for the Socceroos having only 3 friendly matches, all away from home. However, the fixture in March against England made headlines due to Australia recording a famous 3–1 victory over their hosts. The match was also renowned for England making eleven substitutions at half time.

Two friendlies in the latter half of the year saw Ireland come from a goal down to win 2–1 in Dublin in August followed by a September win over Jamaica when Harry Kewell's second half goal gave Australia a 2–1 victory.

== Record ==
Type	GP	W	D	L	GF	GA
Friendly matches	3	2	0	1	6	4
Total	3	2	0	1	6	4

== Match results ==
=== Friendlies ===
12 February 2003 International Friendly	England	1–3	Australia	London, United Kingdom
20:00	Jeffers 70'	Report	17' Popovic; 42' Kewell; 84' Emerton	Stadium: Upton Park; Attendance: 34,590; Referee: Manuel Enrique Mejuto Gonzales (Spain)

19 August 2003 International Friendly	Republic of Ireland	2–1	Australia	Dublin, Ireland
	O'Shea 74'; Morrison 81'		49' Viduka	Stadium: Lansdowne Road; Attendance: 16,108; Referee: Karel Vidlak (Czech Republic)

7 September 2003 International Friendly	Australia	2–1	Jamaica	Reading, United Kingdom
	Bresciano 19'; Kewell 58'		21' Lisbie	Stadium: Madejski Stadium; Referee: Andy D'urso (England)

== Goal scorers ==
Player	Goals
Kewell	2
Bresciano	1
Emerton	1
Viduka	1
Popovic	1
