= Daniele Baldini =

Italian footballer (born 1964)

Personal information
- Full name: Daniele Baldini
- Date of birth: 21 February 1964 (age 62)
- Place of birth: Florence, Italy
- Height: 1.91 m (6 ft 3 in)
- Position: Defender

Youth career
- Prato

Senior career*
Years	Team	Apps	(Gls)
1981–1982	Prato	3	(0)
1982–1988	Pistoiese	92	(6)
1988–1989	Arezzo	16	(0)
1989–1991	Fano	62	(3)
1991–1992	Empoli	36	(3)
1992–1994	Ravenna	50	(4)
1994–1995	Siena	31	(0)
1995–2001	Empoli	170	(3)
Total		460	(19)

Managerial career
- 2001–2003: Empoli (assistant)
- 2003: Empoli
- 2004–2005: Lucchese
- 2005–2009: Roma (assistant)
- 2009–2014: Zenit Saint Petersburg (assistant)
- 2016–2017: Roma (assistant)
- 2017–2019: Internazionale (assistant)
- 2021–2023: Napoli (assistant)
- 2023–: Italy (assistant)
- * Club domestic league appearances and goals

Daniele Baldini (born 21 February 1964) is an Italian former professional footballer who played as a defender. Currently, Baldini is part of the technical staff of the Italy national team.

== Playing career ==
Revealed by Prato youth sectors, Baldini played for several Italian football clubs. He was part of the conquests of Fano in Serie C2, Ravenna in Serie C1 and Empoli in Coppa Italia Serie C, the team for which he played most and retired in 2001.

== Coaching career ==
Baldini became an assistant at Empoli after retiring, and in 2003, he managed the club for six matches in the 2003–04 Serie A. He became one of Luciano Spalletti's main assistants, accompanying him in his work at Roma, Internazionale, Napoli, among others. He is currently part of the Italian national team's staff.

== Honours ==
Fano

- Serie C2: 1989–90 (group C)

Ravenna

- Serie C1: 1992–93 (group A)

Empoli

- Coppa Italia Serie C: 1995-96
