= Darío Silva =

Uruguayan footballer (born 1972)

Personal information
- Full name: Darío Debray Silva Pereira
- Date of birth: 2 November 1972 (age 53)
- Place of birth: Treinta y Tres, Uruguay
- Height: 1.75 m (5 ft 9 in)
- Position: Striker

Senior career*
Years	Team	Apps	(Gls)
1992	Defensor	18	(4)
1993–1994	Peñarol	44	(27)
1995–1998	Cagliari	89	(20)
1995	→ Peñarol (loan)	12	(8)
1998–1999	Espanyol	15	(3)
1999–2003	Málaga	100	(36)
2003–2005	Sevilla	48	(9)
2005–2006	Portsmouth	13	(2)
Total		339	(109)

International career
1994–2005	Uruguay	49	(14)
- * Club domestic league appearances and goals

Darío Debray Silva Pereira (born 2 November 1972) is a Uruguayan retired professional footballer who played as a striker.

After starting his professional career in his country, he moved to Italy with Cagliari where he played for three years before spending the following seven years of his career in Spain – scoring 48 La Liga goals in 163 games, mostly for Málaga – before moving to England. He suffered a serious car accident shortly after leaving Portsmouth, which caused him to lose a leg and end his playing career.

Silva represented the Uruguay national team, playing 49 times, including at the 2002 World Cup.

== Club career ==
=== Peñarol and Cagliari ===
Born in Treinta y Tres in the namesake department, Silva began his career in 1991 with Defensor Sporting (having been a Boca Juniors player for six hours previous to that), signing shortly after with Montevideo and Primera División powerhouse Peñarol;

In 1995, aged 22, he switched to Italy and signed with Cagliari Calcio, where he was nicknamed Sa pibinca (Sardinian for nuisance) due to his frenzied attacking style. In his last season he helped the club return to Serie A, posting his best individual record with 13 goals; during his three-year spell, he also briefly returned to Peñarol on loan.

=== Spain and Portsmouth ===
Silva then moved to Spain, where he would remain for nearly one full decade. He started at RCD Espanyol where he failed to impress, and signed for Málaga CF in 1999. With the Andalusians he formed an efficient attacking partnership with Julio Dely Valdés, also helping to the conquest of the 2002 UEFA Intertoto Cup and consecutive mid-table La Liga finishes; during his tenure with the club, the temperamental player was also sent off six times.

In 2003, aged nearly 31, Silva joined Málaga neighbours Sevilla FC. Two years later, as the club purchased Luís Fabiano, Frédéric Kanouté and Javier Saviola, he was deemed surplus to requirements by manager Joaquín Caparrós and cancelled the last year of his contract, joining Premier League side Portsmouth on a free transfer.

At Pompey, Silva failed to make an impact after suffering an ankle injury and, after scoring just three goals in 15 appearances, he was released from his contract on 13 February 2006. He found the net against Charlton Athletic, Sunderland and Ipswich Town, the latter in the third round of the FA Cup.

== International career ==
Silva made his debut for Uruguay on 19 October 1994, in a friendly match against Peru in the Estadio Nacional José Díaz in Lima (1–0 win). He appeared for the national team at the 1997 FIFA Confederations Cup, the 2002 FIFA World Cup – no goals in three matches in an eventual group stage exit– and the 2004 Copa América. Silva was crucial in helping Uruguay qualify for the 2002 World Cup, scoring the first of their three goals against Australia during the second leg of the 2001 OFC–CONMEBOL play-off in Montevideo. Silva also played in the 2005 OFC–CONMEBOL play-off, where Uruguay ended up losing on penalties to Australia during the second leg in Sydney.

Silva retired from international play after Uruguay failed to qualify to the 2006 World Cup, having played 49 times and scored 14 goals.

== Personal ==
Silva has two children, a daughter named Elina (born c. 1997) and a son named Diego Darío (born c. 2003).

=== Car crash ===
On 23 September 2006, Silva was seriously injured in a car crash in Montevideo, where he was staying at while waiting for a new club to sign him following his Portsmouth stint. The accident occurred when he lost control of his pick-up truck and was thrown from the vehicle, colliding with a lamppost. In the impact, the 33-year-old Silva fractured his skull, being rendered unconscious and suffering a compound fracture on his right leg. At the time of the crash, he was traveling with two other ex-footballers, Elbio Papa and Dardo Pereira, who were not seriously injured.

On the day of the accident, a team of five made the decision to amputate Silva's leg below the knee, and he underwent an operation which lasted for three and a half hours. He was put into a medically induced coma for the amputation. After the operation, there were fears that the amputation would become infected. However, his condition was declared stable a few days later as he recovered at Montevideo's La Española hospital, whose staff expected him to make a full recovery.

After difficulty with coming to terms with the amputation, Silva left the hospital on 5 October 2006, and returned to his home in Montevideo with the plan of receiving a prosthetic leg in Italy to help him walk and run without the aid of crutches. Silva has said that he "wanted to die" when he found that his leg had been amputated. In 2006, he told uefa.com "when I woke up after the accident and realised I was in hospital, I looked under the sheets and saw that my right leg was missing. I started to panic a bit, but ten minutes later, when the doctors explained what had happened, I started crying." However, Silva also said that he was grateful to god that the accident happened at the end of his playing career, rather than at the beginning of it, claiming that he was crying "tears of gratitude" at the hospital.

=== After retirement ===
In October 2006, news reports suggested that Silva was offered a job as a football pundit in his country. He had also expressed a desire to become a manager shortly before retiring, but later changed his mind. He took the pitch again on 13 January 2009 after a three-year absence, taking part in a charity match between Uruguay XI and Argentina XI for the “Fundación Niños con Alas” (Winged Children Foundation), again displaying his scoring touch after converting a penalty kick.

Afterwards, Silva was involved in breeding of racing horses, also recommending the animal for therapeutic purposes. In May 2019, rumours circulated that he was broke and working as a waiter in a pizzeria in Málaga; shortly after, he denied this and stated he was only a friend of the person who ran the business.

== Career statistics ==
=== International ===
Appearances and goals by national team and year
National team	Year	Apps	Goals
Uruguay	1994	1	1
Uruguay	1995	9	1
Uruguay	1997	8	4
Uruguay	2000	7	3
Uruguay	2001	10	3
Uruguay	2002	4	0
Uruguay	2004	8	2
Uruguay	2005	2	0
Total		49	14

Scores and results list Uruguay's goal tally first, score column indicates score after each Silva goal.

List of international goals scored by Darío Silva
No.	Date	Venue	Opponent	Score	Result	Competition	Ref.
1	19 October 1994	National Stadium, Lima, Peru	Peru	1–0	1–0	Friendly	
2	25 June 1995	Estadio Parque Artigas, Paysandú, Uruguay	New Zealand	5–0	7–0	Friendly	
3	30 April 1997	Estadio Defensores del Chaco, Asunción, Paraguay	Paraguay	1–3	1–3	1998 FIFA World Cup qualification	
4	8 June 1997	Estadio Centenario, Montevideo, Uruguay	Colombia	1–0	1–1	1998 FIFA World Cup qualification	
5	17 December 1997	King Fahd International Stadium, Riyadh, Saudi Arabia	South Africa	1–1	4–3	1997 FIFA Confederations Cup	
6	17 December 1997	King Fahd International Stadium, Riyadh, Saudi Arabia	South Africa	3–1	4–3	1997 FIFA Confederations Cup	
7	3 June 2000	Estadio Centenario, Montevideo, Uruguay	Chile	1–0	2–1	2002 FIFA World Cup qualification	
8	28 June 2000	Maracanã Stadium, Rio de Janeiro, Brazil	Brazil	1–0	1–1	2002 FIFA World Cup qualification	
9	3 September 2000	Estadio Centenario, Montevideo, Uruguay	Ecuador	2–0	4–0	2002 FIFA World Cup qualification	
10	4 September 2001	National Stadium, Lima, Peru	Peru	1–0	2–0	2002 FIFA World Cup qualification	
11	14 November 2001	Estadio Centenario, Montevideo, Uruguay	Argentina	1–0	1–1	2002 FIFA World Cup qualification	
12	25 November 2001	Estadio Centenario, Montevideo, Uruguay	Australia	1–0	3–0	2002 FIFA World Cup qualification	
13	18 July 2004	Estadio Jorge Basadre, Tacna, Peru	Paraguay	2–1	3–1	2004 Copa América	
14	18 July 2004	Estadio Jorge Basadre, Tacna, Peru	Paraguay	3–1	3–1	2004 Copa América	

== Honours ==
Peñarol

- Uruguayan Primera División: 1993, 1994, 1995

Málaga

- UEFA Intertoto Cup: 2002
