= Richard Morales =

Uruguayan footballer (born 1975)

Personal information
- Full name: Richard Javier Morales Aguirre
- Date of birth: 21 February 1975 (age 51)
- Place of birth: Las Piedras, Uruguay
- Height: 1.96 m (6 ft 5 in)
- Position: Centre forward

Senior career*
| Years | Team | Apps | (Gls) |
| 1996 | Platense | 12 | (1) |
| 1997–1998 | Basáñez | 14 | (7) |
| 1999–2002 | Nacional | 98 | (44) |
| 2003–2005 | Osasuna | 50 | (11) |
| 2005–2007 | Málaga | 42 | (3) |
| 2007–2008 | Nacional | 25 | (8) |
| 2008–2009 | Grêmio | 6 | (1) |
| 2009 | LDU | 3 | (0) |
| 2009–2010 | Fénix | 5 | (0) |
| Total | | 255 | (75) |

International career
| 2001–2005 | Uruguay | 27 | (6) |
- * Club domestic league appearances and goals

Ríchard Javier Morales Aguirre (born 21 February 1975) is a Uruguayan retired footballer who played as a centre forward.

Nicknamed Chengue, he was mostly known for his tremendous physical strength and volatile temperament. He played professionally in four countries – mainly Spain – his heyday coming at Nacional.

Morales represented Uruguay at the 2002 World Cup, as well as in two Copa América tournaments.

== Club career ==
Morales was born in Las Piedras, Canelones Department. After starting his professional career with Club Atlético Platense and Basáñez, he transferred to Club Nacional de Football in 1999. There, he helped the capital club to the 1998 Primera División title.

In January 2003, Morales moved to Spain, reuniting with Pablo García at CA Osasuna. After spending his first two and a half seasons as a rarely used attacking option (his first goals came in late April-early March 2004 in two consecutive 1–1 draws, against Real Valladolid and Málaga CF), he scored nine La Liga goals in the 2004–05 campaign, being instrumental in the Navarrese side's narrow escape from relegation.

Morales signed for Málaga subsequently, but would only net once in 2005–06 as the Andalusians went on to rank last, adding just two in the following season's second division.

On 5 August 2008 Morales, after a brief return stint with Nacional, agreed to a contract with Clube de Regatas do Flamengo for the rest of the campaign, with the option to renew the contract for another year. However, the following day, after club players were violently attacked by its fans, he decided not to join the Rio de Janeiro team.

On 31 August 2008, Morales signed with Grêmio Foot-Ball Porto Alegrense. The following 16 February he moved to L.D.U. Quito, but left the squad on 2 April due to his father's poor health; before retiring the following year, he played a few matches for Centro Atlético Fénix.

== International career ==
Morales made his debut for Uruguay at 26, during the 2001 Copa América, where he scored in the 1–2 semi-final loss to Mexico. Morales scored two late goals against Australia in the 2nd leg of the qualification playoffs on 15 November 2001 that secured his country a place at the 2002 FIFA World Cup in South Korea and Japan.

In the final group stage match, Morales scored once in the 3–3 draw against Senegal, but Uruguay failed to qualify for Round of 16 coming 3rd in their group. He received a total of 27 caps, scoring six goals.

International goals for Uruguay

Score and results list Uruguay's goal tally first.

| # | Date | Venue | Opponent | Score | Result | Competition |
|---|---|---|---|---|---|---|
| 1. | 25 July 2001 | Estadio Hernán Ramírez Villegas, Pereira, Colombia | Mexico | 1–1 | 1–2 | 2001 Copa América |
| 2. | 25 November 2001 | Estadio Centenario, Montevideo, Uruguay | Australia | 2–0 | 3–0 | 2002 FIFA World Cup play-off |
| 3. | 25 November 2001 | Estadio Centenario, Montevideo, Uruguay | Australia | 3–0 | 3–0 | 2002 FIFA World Cup play-off |
| 4. | 21 May 2002 | National Stadium, Singapore | Singapore | 1–0 | 2–1 | Friendly |
| 5. | 21 May 2002 | National Stadium, Singapore | Singapore | 2–0 | 2–1 | Friendly |
| 6. | 11 June 2002 | Suwon World Cup Stadium, Suwon, South Korea | Senegal | 1–3 | 3–3 | 2002 FIFA World Cup |
