= Carlos Diogo =

Uruguayan footballer (born 1983)

Personal information
- Full name: Carlos Andrés Diogo Enseñat
- Date of birth: 18 July 1983 (age 43)
- Place of birth: Montevideo, Uruguay
- Height: 1.85 m (6 ft 1 in)
- Position: Wingback

Youth career
- 1999–2001: River Plate (UY)

Senior career*
Years	Team	Apps	(Gls)
2001–2004	River Plate (UY)	74	(3)
2004	Peñarol	16	(0)
2005	River Plate	11	(1)
2005–2007	Real Madrid	13	(0)
2006–2007	→ Zaragoza (loan)	30	(4)
2007–2011	Zaragoza	77	(2)
2012–2013	Huesca	27	(3)
2013–2014	Gent	13	(2)
2014	Zaragoza	9	(0)
Total		270	(15)

International career
2003–2007	Uruguay	22	(0)
- * Club domestic league appearances and goals

Carlos Andrés Diogo Enseñat (born 18 July 1983) is a Uruguayan former footballer who played as a right-sided wing-back or midfielder. An ex-international for Uruguay, he is best known for his unsuccessful tenure at Real Madrid.

Diogo amassed La Liga totals of 120 games and six goals over five seasons. Aside from Spain and his native Uruguay, he also played in Argentina and Belgium.

== Club career ==
Diogo was born in Montevideo. He started his career with River Plate (UY) and Peñarol, moving to Argentina's River Plate in January 2005.

In July 2005, Diogo signed with Spanish giants Real Madrid as compatriot Pablo García, but found first team opportunities scarce. On 23 August 2006, the club decided to send him to fellow La Liga side Real Zaragoza on a season-long loan; the move was made permanent in April 2007, but Madrid agreed to take just €4.5 million instead of the initial six million, with the condition the player did not join Barcelona in the future.

On 6 January 2007, Diogo was involved in a fight with Sevilla's Luís Fabiano after apparently stepping on the Brazilian's hand and insulting him, which led to the latter putting the former in a strangle-hold in the closing stages of the game. This incident was punished with a five-match ban to both players.

Due to a serious knee injury, Diogo missed the entire 2008–09 campaign, with the Aragonese now in the second division. He underwent a second operation in April 2009, being sidelined for a further eight months.

On 12 December 2009, with Zaragoza back in the top level, Diogo returned to action with a goal, but in a 1–2 league home loss against Athletic Bilbao. The player still contributed with a further 14 appearances, as the team managed to avoid relegation.

Diogo returned to full fitness in 2010–11, starting in all the league games he took part in (2,950 minutes of play) as Zaragoza again narrowly escaped relegation. He left the club in July, after failing to negotiate a new deal.

Diogo signed a contract with CSKA Sofia in mid-January 2012, but requested to leave the Bulgarian side after only 15 days, which was conceded. In late September, he returned to active football, signing with Zaragoza neighbours Huesca.

In June 2013, Diogo agreed to a one-year deal at Belgian Pro League's Gent, He was released in January of the following year, returning to Zaragoza in the summer.

== International career ==
An Uruguay international since 28 March 2003, playing nine minutes in a 2–2 friendly match against Japan in Tokyo, Diogo represented the nation at the 2004 and 2007 Copa América tournaments.

== Personal life ==
Diogo is the son of footballer Víctor Diogo, who also played for Peñarol and with some Brazilian clubs.
