= Víctor Púa =

Uruguayan footballer and manager (born 1956)

Personal information
- Full name: Víctor Haroldo Púa Sosa
- Date of birth: 31 May 1956 (age 70)
- Place of birth: Paso de los Toros, Uruguay
- Position: Defender

Team information
- Current team: Peñarol (academy manager)

Senior career*
Years	Team	Apps	(Gls)
1970–1974	Liverpool MVD		
1975	Colón		
1976–1977	Bella Vista		
1978–1981	Defensor		
1982	Olimpia		
1983	Defensor		
1984	Rampla Juniors		
1985	River Plate UY		
1986	Bella Vista		
1987	Mandiyú		
1988	Sportivo Italiano		
1989	Cerrito		

Managerial career
- 1990–1993: River Plate UY
- –: Uruguay U-17
- –: Uruguay U-20
- 1997–2000: Uruguay
- 2000–2001: Uruguay (assistant)
- 2001–2003: Uruguay
- 2004: Rosario Central
- 2009: Peñarol
Medal record
Men's association football
Representing Uruguay
Pan American Games
Gold medal – first place	1983 Caracas	Team
- * Club domestic league appearances and goals

Víctor Haroldo Púa Sosa (born 31 May 1956 in Paso de los Toros) is a Uruguayan former football player and football manager who currently serves as an academy manager for Peñarol.

== Career ==
He coached the Uruguay U-20 national team, finishing runner-up in the 1997 FIFA World Youth Championship.

He was appointed to coach the Uruguay national team in the 1999 Copa América, earning second place honors. In 2001, he was chosen to replace Daniel Passarella, qualifying for the 2002 FIFA World Cup after finishing 5th in the South American zone and winning a playoff against Australia. Uruguay was drawn into group A alongside world champions France, Denmark and eventual tournament revelation Senegal. After a defeat to Denmark and a 0–0 draw with France, Uruguay had to beat Senegal to make it to the next round. Despite coming back from a 0–3 at half time, Richard Morales narrowly missed a fourth goal with the goalkeeper down, which left Uruguay in 3rd place and out of the next round.

In 2004, he coached Argentine side Rosario Central but resigned after only 2 matches, because of differences with the board and a defeat to Newell's Old Boys in the local derby.

== Clubs as player ==
- Liverpool Montevideo
- River Plate Montevideo
- Defensor Sporting Club
- Olimpia Asunción
- Deportivo Mandiyú
- Rampla Juniors
- Cerrito

== Teams as coach ==
- River Plate Montevideo
- Uruguay
- Rosario Central
- Peñarol youths general manager 2007–2009, manager 2009

== Family ==
His son is the midfielder Federico Púa, currently playing in Chile.
