= 2003–04 Serie A =

102nd season of top-tier Italian football

Serie A
- Season: 2003–04
- Dates: 30 August 2003 – 16 May 2004
- Champions: Milan; 17th title
- Relegated: Perugia; Modena; Empoli; Ancona (to C2 after bankruptcy)
- Champions League: Milan; Roma; Juventus; Internazionale
- UEFA Cup: Parma; Lazio; Udinese
- Matches: 306
- Goals: 816 (2.67 per match)
- Top goalscorer: Andriy Shevchenko (24 goals)
- Biggest home win: Internazionale 6–0 Reggina (22 November 2003); Roma 6–0 Siena (22 February 2004)
- Biggest away win: Bologna 0–4 Roma (23 November 2003)
- Highest scoring: Brescia 4–4 Reggina (21 September 2003)
- Longest unbeaten run: Milan; 19 games
- Longest winless run: Ancona; 28 games
- Highest attendance: 78,334; Milan v Internazionale
- Lowest attendance: 3,774; Empoli v Udinese

The 2003–04 Serie A (known as the Serie A TIM for sponsorship reasons) was the 102nd season of top-tier Italian football, the 72nd in a round-robin tournament. It contained 18 teams for the 16th and last time from the 1988–89 season. With the bottom three being relegated, the 15th placed side would face the sixth-highest team from Serie B, with the winner playing in the Serie A in the subsequent 2004–05 season.

As usual, the top two teams would progress directly to the UEFA Champions League group stage, while third and fourth place would have to begin in the third qualifying round. The UEFA Cup places would be awarded to fifth and sixth place, and the winners of the Coppa Italia.

Milan won their 17th scudetto; Roma impressed and were pushing for the title until the last few weeks of the season; Internazionale only made it to the Champions League ahead of Parma and Lazio on the last day thanks to Adriano, who had been signed from Parma earlier in the season; Lazio won the Coppa Italia against Juventus, handing Udinese the UEFA Cup spot; Ancona were relegated with only two wins, the joint lowest tally ever (Brescia's 12 points in 1994–95 Serie A is still the lowest ever); Empoli and Modena were also relegated; Perugia lost their special play-off, imposed to expand the league, against Fiorentina, who returned to Serie A after a two-year absence.

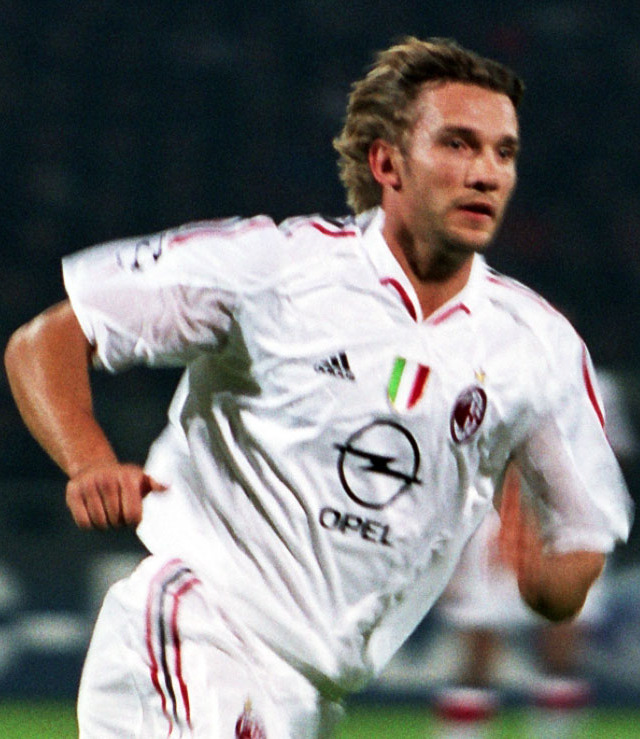
Milan’s Andriy Shevchenko

Ukrainian forward Andriy Shevchenko of Milan was the top scorer, with 24 goals. The 2003–04 league was the last professional season in the career of former European Footballer of the Year and Italian international Roberto Baggio, who finished among the tournament's top ten scorers with 12 goals, and among the all-time top five scorers in Serie A, with 205 career goals. It was also the last Serie A season for Baggio's former teammate Giuseppe Signori, who then moved to the Super League Greece. Signori ended his career in Italy as the seventh highest scorer ever in Serie A.

== Teams ==
Eighteen teams competed in the league – the top fourteen teams from the previous season and the four teams promoted from the Serie B. The promoted teams were Siena, Sampdoria, Lecce and Ancona. Sampdoria, Lecce and Ancona returned to the top flight after an absence of four, one and ten years respectively, while Siena played in the top flight for the first time in history. They replaced Atalanta (relegated after three seasons in the top flight), Piacenza, Torino (both teams relegated after a two-years presence) and Como (relegated after a season's presence).

== Rule changes ==
Unlike La Liga, which imposed a quota on the number of non-EU players on each club, Serie A clubs could sign as many non-EU players as available on domestic transfer. But for the 2003–04 season a quota was imposed on each of the clubs limiting the number of non-EU, non-EFTA and non-Swiss players who may be signed from abroad each season, following provisional measures introduced in the 2002–03 season, which allowed Serie A & B clubs to sign only one non-EU player in the 2002 summer transfer window.

== Personnel and sponsoring ==
Locations of the 2003–04 Serie A teams

Team	Head coach	Kit manufacturer	Shirt sponsor
Ancona*	(Italy) Giovanni Galeone	Le Coq Sportif	Banca Marche
Bologna	(Italy) Carlo Mazzone	Macron	Area Banca
Brescia	(Italy) Gianni De Biasi	Umbro/Kappa	Banca Lombarda
Chievo	(Italy) Luigi Del Neri	Lotto	Paluani/Columbia TriStar Film Distributors International (Note: As part of the agreement, the logos of the following films distributed by Columbia TriStar Film Distributors International were shown: Terminator 3: Rise of the Machines and Bad Boys II)
Empoli	(Italy) Attilio Perotti	Erreà	Sammontana
Internazionale	(Italy) Alberto Zaccheroni	Nike	Pirelli
Juventus	(Italy) Marcello Lippi	Nike	Fastweb/Tamoil (in UEFA matches)
Lazio	(Italy) Roberto Mancini	Puma	Parmacotto/Indesit (in UEFA matches)
Lecce*	(Italy) Delio Rossi	Asics	Salento
Milan	(Italy) Carlo Ancelotti	Adidas	Opel Meriva
Modena	(Italy) Gianfranco Bellotto	Erreà	Immergas
Parma	(Italy) Cesare Prandelli	Champion	Parmalat/Cariparma/Santàl (in UEFA matches)
Perugia	(Italy) Serse Cosmi	Galex	Toyota
Reggina	(Italy) Giancarlo Camolese	Asics	Spi Serramenti/Credit Suisse/FamilyMart/Stocco&Stocco (in cup matches)
Roma	(Italy) Fabio Capello	Diadora	Mazda
Sampdoria*	(Italy) Walter Novellino	Asics	Erg
Siena*	(Italy) Giuseppe Papadopulo	Lotto	Monte Paschi Vita
Udinese	(Italy) Luciano Spalletti	Le Coq Sportif	Bernardi/Postalmarket

(*) Promoted from Serie B.

== Managerial changes ==
Team	Outgoing manager	Manner of departure	Date of vacancy	Incoming manager	Date of appointment	Position in table
Empoli	(Italy) Silvio Baldini	End of contract	30 June 2003	(Italy) Daniele Baldini	1 July 2003	Pre-season
Ancona	(Italy) Luigi Simoni	End of contract	30 June 2003	(Italy) Leonardo Menichini	1 July 2003	Pre-season
Reggina	(Italy) Luigi de Canio	End of contract	30 June 2003	(Italy) Franco Colomba	1 July 2003	Pre-season
Modena	(Italy) Gianni De Biasi	End of contract	30 June 2003	(Italy) Alberto Malesani	1 July 2003	Pre-season
Brescia	(Italy) Carlo Mazzone	End of contract	30 June 2003	(Italy) Gianni De Biasi	1 July 2003	Pre-season
Bologna	(Italy) Francesco Guidolin	Sacked	26 August 2003	(Italy) Carlo Mazzone	28 August 2003	Pre-season
Ancona	(Italy) Leonardo Menichini	Sacked	29 September 2003	(Italy) Nedo Sonetti	1 October 2003	18th
Internazionale	(Argentina) Héctor Cúper	Sacked	20 October 2003	(Italy) Alberto Zaccheroni	21 October 2003	8th
Empoli	(Italy) Daniele Baldini	Sacked	21 October 2003	(Italy) Attilio Perotti	22 October 2003	17th
Reggina	(Italy) Franco Colomba	Sacked	24 November 2003	(Italy) Sergio Buso (caretaker)	27 November 2003	13th
Reggina	(Italy) Sergio Buso	End of caretaker spell	1 December 2003	(Italy) Giancarlo Camolese	3 December 2003	12th
Ancona	(Italy) Nedo Sonetti	Sacked	27 January 2004	(Italy) Giovanni Galeone	28 January 2004	18th
Modena	(Italy) Alberto Malesani	Sacked	23 March 2004	(Italy) Gianfranco Bellotto	24 March 2004	15th

== League table ==
Pos	Team	Pld	W	D	L	GF	GA	GD	Pts	Qualification or relegation
1	Milan (C)	34	25	7	2	65	24	+41	82	Qualification to Champions League group stage
2	Roma	34	21	8	5	68	19	+49	71	Qualification to Champions League group stage
3	Juventus	34	21	6	7	67	42	+25	69	Qualification to Champions League third qualifying round
4	Internazionale	34	17	8	9	59	37	+22	59	Qualification to Champions League third qualifying round
5	Parma	34	16	10	8	57	46	+11	58	Qualification to UEFA Cup first round
6	Lazio	34	16	8	10	52	38	+14	56	Qualification to UEFA Cup first round
7	Udinese (Note: Udinese gained entry to the 2004–05 UEFA Cup as Coppa Italia because both finalists Lazio and Juventus qualified for the 2004–05 UEFA Cup and the 2004–05 UEFA Champions League through league position, respectively.)	34	13	11	10	44	40	+4	50	Qualification to UEFA Cup first round
8	Sampdoria	34	11	13	10	40	42	−2	46	
9	Chievo	34	11	11	12	36	37	−1	44	
10	Lecce	34	11	8	15	43	56	−13	41	
11	Brescia	34	9	13	12	52	57	−5	40	
12	Bologna	34	10	9	15	45	53	−8	39	
13	Reggina	34	6	16	12	29	45	−16	34 (Note: Reggina finished ahead of Siena on head-to-head points: Reggina 2–1 Siena, Siena 0–0 Reggina.)	
14	Siena	34	8	10	16	41	54	−13	34	
15	Perugia (R)	34	6	14	14	44	56	−12	32	Relegation play-off
16	Modena (R)	34	6	12	16	27	46	−19	30 (Note: Modena finished ahead of Empoli on head-to-head points: Empoli 0–3 Modena, Modena 1–1 Empoli.)	Relegation to Serie B
17	Empoli (R)	34	7	9	18	26	54	−28	30	Relegation to Serie B
18	Ancona (Note: Ancona was denied entry to the 2004–05 Serie B season, having entered administration. It was later admitted to the Lega Professionisti Serie C after bankruptcy.) (R, E, R)	34	2	7	25	21	70	−49	13	Phoenix in Serie C2

Source: Almanacco Illustrato del Calcio – La Storia 1898-2004, Panini Edizioni, Modena, September 2005
Rules for classification: 1) points; 2) tiebreaker for relevant positions 3) head-to-head points and goal difference; 4) head-to-head goals scored; 5) goal difference; 6) number of goals scored.
(C) Champions; (E) Eliminated; (R) Relegated

== Results ==
Home \ Away	ANC	BOL	BRE	CHV	EMP	INT	JUV	LAZ	LCE	MIL	MOD	PAR	PER	REG	ROM	SAM	SIE	UDI
Ancona		3–2	1–1	0–2	2–1	0–2	2–3	0–1	0–2	0–2	1–1	0–2	0–0	1–1	0–0	0–1	0–0	0–3
Bologna	3–2		3–0	3–1	2–1	0–2	0–1	2–1	1–1	0–2	1–1	2–2	2–2	2–2	0–4	0–1	3–1	2–0
Brescia	5–2	0–0		1–1	2–0	2–2	2–3	2–1	1–2	0–1	0–0	2–3	1–1	4–4	1–0	1–1	4–2	1–2
Chievo	1–0	2–1	3–1		0–0	0–2	1–2	0–0	2–3	0–2	2–0	0–2	4–1	0–0	0–3	1–1	1–1	0–0
Empoli	2–0	2–0	1–1	0–1		2–3	3–3	2–2	0–0	0–1	0–3	1–0	1–0	1–1	0–2	1–1	1–0	2–0
Internazionale	3–0	4–2	1–3	0–0	0–1		3–2	0–0	3–1	1–3	2–0	1–0	2–1	6–0	0–0	0–0	4–0	1–2
Juventus	3–0	2–1	2–0	1–0	5–1	1–3		1–0	3–4	1–3	3–1	4–0	1–0	1–0	2–2	2–0	4–2	4–1
Lazio	4–2	2–1	0–1	1–0	3–0	2–1	2–0		4–1	0–1	2–1	2–3	3–1	1–1	1–1	1–1	5–2	2–2
Lecce	3–1	1–2	1–4	1–2	2–1	2–1	1–1	0–1		1–1	1–0	1–2	1–2	2–1	0–3	0–0	0–0	2–1
Milan	5–0	2–1	4–2	2–2	1–0	3–2	1–1	1–0	3–0		2–0	3–1	2–1	3–1	1–0	3–1	2–1	1–2
Modena	2–1	2–0	1–1	0–3	1–1	1–1	0–2	1–1	2–0	1–1		2–2	1–0	1–2	0–1	1–0	1–3	0–1
Parma	3–1	0–0	2–2	3–1	4–0	1–0	2–2	0–3	3–1	0–0	3–0		3–0	1–2	1–4	1–0	1–1	4–3
Perugia	1–0	4–2	2–2	0–2	1–1	2–3	1–0	1–2	2–2	1–1	1–1	2–2		0–0	0–1	3–3	2–2	3–3
Reggina	0–0	0–0	0–0	0–0	2–0	0–2	0–2	2–1	1–3	2–1	1–1	1–1	1–2		0–0	2–2	2–1	0–1
Roma	3–0	1–2	5–0	3–1 (Note: The match was played at Stadio Renzo Barbera.)	3–0 (Note: The match was played at Stadio Renzo Barbera.)	4–1	4–0	2–0	3–1	1–2	1–0	2–0	1–3 (Note: The match was played at Stadio Renzo Barbera.)	2–0		3–1	6–0	1–1
Sampdoria	2–0	3–2	2–1	1–0	2–0	2–2	1–2	1–2	2–2	0–3	1–1	1–2	3–2	2–0	0–0		2–1	1–3
Siena	3–2	0–0	0–1	1–2	4–0	0–1	1–3	3–0	2–1	1–2	4–0	1–2	2–1	0–0	0–0	0–0		1–0
Udinese	3–0	1–3	4–3	1–1	2–0	0–0	0–0	1–2	1–0	0–0	1–0	1–1	1–1	1–0	1–2	0–1	1–1	

Source: lega-calcio.it (in Italian)
Legend: Blue = home team win; Yellow = draw; Red = away team win.

== Qualification play-offs ==
Perugia had to play a qualification match with 6th-placed team of Serie B, Fiorentina.

16 June 2004
20:30 CEST

Perugia	0–1	Fiorentina
		Fantini 10'

Stadio Renato Curi, Perugia
Attendance: 23,500
Referee: Matteo Trefoloni

20 June 2004
20:30 CEST

Fiorentina	1–1	Perugia
Fantini 47'		do Prado 82'

Stadio Artemio Franchi, Florence
Attendance: 43,000
Referee: Roberto Rosetti

Fiorentina won 2–1 on aggregate and were promoted to 2004–05 Serie A; Perugia were relegated to 2004–05 Serie B.

== Top goalscorers ==
Rank	Player	Club	Goals
1	(Ukraine) Andriy Shevchenko	Milan	24
2	(Italy) Alberto Gilardino	Parma	23
3	(Italy) Francesco Totti	Roma	20
4	(Uruguay) Javier Chevantón	Lecce	19
5	(Brazil) Adriano	Internazionale, Parma	17
6	(France) David Trezeguet	Juventus	16
7	(Italy) Antonio Cassano	Roma	14
8	(Italy) Fabio Bazzani	Sampdoria	13
8	(Italy) Christian Vieri	Internazionale	13
10	(Italy) Roberto Baggio	Brescia	12
10	(Italy) Andrea Caracciolo	Brescia	12
10	(Italy) Dino Fava	Udinese	12
10	(Denmark) Jon Dahl Tomasson	Milan	12

== Season transfers ==
- Summer transfer
- Winter transfers
- Co-ownerships
- Co-ownerships II

== Attendances ==
#	Club	Avg. attendance	Highest
1	AC Milan	63,245	78,334
2	Internazionale	58,352	75,831
3	SS Lazio	49,341	60,929
4	AS Roma	46,458	73,383
5	Juventus FC	34,365	53,883
6	UC Sampdoria	26,224	35,557
7	Bologna FC	23,062	33,782
8	Reggina Calcio	20,523	24,082
9	Udinese Calcio	17,642	29,819
10	US Lecce	16,409	31,967
11	Parma AC	15,904	23,663
12	Modena FC	15,480	18,748
13	ChievoVerona	14,868	34,624
14	Brescia Calcio	13,807	20,878
15	AC Ancona	13,235	23,306
16	AC Siena	11,142	13,310
17	AC Perugia	11,047	18,796
18	Empoli FC	7,340	16,186
