= Cribari =

Cribari is an Italian surname. Notable people with the surname include:

- Fábio Eduardo Cribari (born 1975), known as "Binho", Brazilian footballer of Italian descent, brother of Emílson
- Emílson Sánchez Cribari (born 1980), known as "Emílson Cribari" Brazilian footballer of Italian descent
