= Mark Bresciano =

Australian soccer player (born 1980)

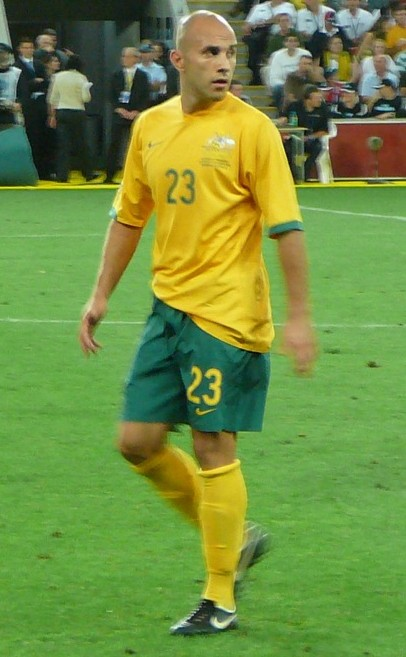
- Bresciano with Australia in 2006

Personal information
- Date of birth: 11 February 1980 (age 46)
- Place of birth: Melbourne, Australia
- Height: 1.82 m (6 ft 0 in)
- Positions: Attacking midfielder; winger

Youth career
- 1986–1996: Bulleen Lions
- 1997: AIS

Senior career*
Years	Team	Apps	(Gls)
1995–1997	Bulleen Lions	9	(4)
1997–1999	Carlton	28	(6)
1999–2002	Empoli	80	(17)
2002–2006	Parma	123	(19)
2006–2010	Palermo	107	(12)
2010–2011	Lazio	20	(0)
2011–2012	Al Nasr	17	(10)
2012–2015	Al-Gharafa	51	(3)
Total		435	(71)

International career
1997	Australia U17	5	(5)
1998–1999	Australia U20	7	(0)
1998–2000	Australia U23	15	(0)
2001–2015	Australia	84	(13)
Medal record
Representing Australia
Men's Association football
FIFA Confederations Cup
Third place	2001 South Korea-Japan
AFC Asian Cup
Winner	2015 Australia
Runner-up	2011 Qatar
OFC Nations Cup
Winner	2004 Australia
OFC U-20 Championship
Winner	1998 Samoa
- * Club domestic league appearances and goals

Mark Bresciano (/brɛˈʃɑːnoʊ/ breh-SHAH-noh; Italian: [breʃˈʃaːno]; born 11 February 1980) is an Australian former professional soccer player who played as a midfielder.

Born in Melbourne, Bresciano played youth football for Bulleen Lions, before moving into the National Soccer League with Carlton. In 1999, he moved to Italian Serie B side Empoli, beginning a twelve-year stay in the country. In 2002, he moved to the Serie A with Parma, later playing for Palermo and SS Lazio. From 2011, he spent the final four years of his career in the Middle East, first with UAE Pro League side Al Nasr and then Qatar Stars League club Al-Gharafa where he last played in 2015.

Bresciano had a long career for Australia, making 84 appearances and scoring 13 goals. He played in three FIFA World Cups, two AFC Asian Cups (one victorious) and the 2004 OFC Nations Cup winning team. His goal against Uruguay in the 2006 World Cup qualification play-off sent the match to a penalty shootout which Australia won to qualify for the first time in 32 years. He previously represented Australia frequently at youth levels, including the 2000 Summer Olympics in Australia and the 1999 FIFA U-20 World Cup.

== Biography ==
=== Early days in Australia ===
Bresciano grew up in Rosanna, Melbourne. He began playing football locally and later progressed to the first team of Victorian Premier League side Bulleen Lions in 1995 at the age of 15. He made little impact until his third year in the first team, scoring four goals in four league games and helping Bulleen to the 1997 VPL grand final. Bresciano's reputation began to grow and he was selected in an Australian Schoolboys squad that toured the United Kingdom in 1996. In 1997, he featured prominently in Australia's unsuccessful U17 World Cup qualifying campaign, scoring five goals.

At the end of the 1997 season and upon completing high school at Marcellin College, he was offered a place at the Australian Institute of Sport, where he reunited with childhood pal Vince Grella. The players' careers would mirror in the coming years as the two supported their footballing endeavours on and off the field. He and Vince Grella signed with new National Soccer League (NSL) club Carlton for the 1997–98 season, but Bresciano was forced to wait until Round 17 to make his NSL debut. He then played every game for the rest of the year, as Carlton finished second with a place in the finals. Bresciano scored in injury time to win the elimination semi-final and put the club into its first grand final, which they lost 2–1. He stayed with the Blues for the 1998–99 season, scoring four goals in 18 games, but the club finished well outside the top six. In 1998 and 1999, Bresciano made a number of appearances for Australia in various matches at Under-20 and Under-23 level, including the 1999 FIFA World Youth Championship, where the Young Socceroos were eliminated in the first round.

=== Move to Italy ===
As for many Australian players, a career in Europe beckoned for Bresciano as he sought to develop his game and further his career. Bresciano and Grella had sights set on a move to Italy, spurred in part by their Italian heritage. The pair joined Empoli in 1999, who had been relegated to Serie B the previous season, and became regular selections in the first team. In Bresciano's third year at the club, he scored 10 goals and helped Empoli to a fourth position and promotion back to the top-flight Serie A. The pair also appeared several times in the Australian Under-23 team in the lead-up to the 2000 Olympics, particularly in friendlies held in Europe. They were both included in the team for the Sydney Olympics, although Bresciano only saw limited action as a substitute. The following year, his efforts with the Olympic squad were rewarded with a call-up to the "Socceroos." On 1 June 2001, Bresciano received his first cap for Australia in a Confederations Cup match against France, coming on as a substitute in the 78th minute for Josip Skoko. He made a further five appearances that year for the "Socceroos," including another match against France in a friendly at the Melbourne Cricket Ground (MCG), again replacing Skoko as a substitute.

As a little kid I always wanted to play in Italy. Now that I am there I want to stay there and be the most successful Australian ever to play in Italy.

In the summer of 2002, he joined Parma for €7 million, at the time a record transfer fee for an Australian player. "Moving to Parma was a big change in every way, not just money-wise but it is a big club. The structure of the club, the facilities, its popularity means you are under a lot more pressure to get a result," he said following the close of the season, well aware of his profile. Though he was hampered by a series of injuries, his 24 appearances in 2002–03 helped Parma to fifth and a UEFA Cup place. With Empoli being relegated again, he was reunited with Grella who stayed in Serie A with a transfer to Parma.

=== Goal scoring for Parma and Socceroos ===
Setting himself a target for the 2003–04 season of five goals, Bresciano surpassed that with eight goals from 33 appearances, the most of any midfielder in the Serie A, as Parma finished fifth in the league again. Bresciano had also claimed a regular spot in the Socceroos line-up, justifying his selection with a string of goals, including a match-winning free-kick against New Zealand and the only goal in a one-nil victory against South Africa. Parma's fifth place qualified them for the UEFA Cup, where the club advanced through to the semi-finals before being eliminated by eventual winners CSKA Moscow. Their league performance that year was in stark contrast to their UEFA Cup form, as they were forced in to a play-off to retain their Serie A status by finishing 18th in the league. Bresciano and Grella were excused from the 2005 Confederations Cup by then-Australian manager Frank Farina to allow them to take part in the play-off against Bologna — Parma went on to win the tie and remained in Serie A for the following season. Both players returned to the Australian squad in September 2005, now under the direction of Guus Hiddink, for World Cup qualification playoff against the Solomon Islands, followed by a friendly against Jamaica where Bresciano scored the first of Australia's five goals. After playing the first leg of the CONMEBOL – OFC World Cup qualification play-off against Uruguay on 12 November, Bresciano scored the only goal in the second leg four days later. The 1–0 win levelled the playoff 1–1 on aggregate after extra time and the Socceroos won the ensuing penalty shoot-out to advance to the World Cup.

Parma recovered well in the 2005–06 season with Bresciano playing the majority of games, finishing a respectable 10th by season's end in May 2006 (later rising to seventh and a UEFA Cup place after the Calciopoli findings). Bresciano described their resurgence as physically finding their form. Despite starting poorly, the team went from "strength to strength" as the season went on, with Bresciano himself becoming mentally tougher for the experience.

=== 2006 World Cup ===
Buoyed by his strong club season, Bresciano played in Australia's opening game of the 2006 FIFA World Cup, being substituted before the team went on to score three goals and defeat Japan. He came on as a substitute in the second game against Brazil and, in the third Group Stage game, was instrumental in the 79th-minute goal scored by Harry Kewell against Croatia. The goal resulted in a 2–2 draw, a result securing Australia's place in the second round. Against Italy, Bresciano was judged to be in a scoring position in the 50th minute when fouled by Marco Materazzi, the Italian receiving a red card. Italy went on to win after being awarded a penalty in the dying minutes of the game, eliminating the Socceroos. After being identified as a key player for Australia, Bresciano's overall performance at the tournament failed to live up to expectations, described by a Football Australia writer as 'solid without being spectacular', although his role as a set-piece-specialist was highlighted.

=== Palermo and Asian Cup ===
Shortly after the end of the World Cup, Bresciano was signed by Palermo on a four-year contract, and made regular first team appearances in the Serie A and Europe. In October 2006 Bresciano scored what some – including Socceroos Assistant Coach John Kosmina – have described as the greatest goal ever scored for Australia in a full international match. In an Asian Cup qualification match against Bahrain, Mile Sterjovski received a cross-field pass which was played first-time back into the penalty area, Bresciano reacting quickly to turn his body horizontally and strike the ball on the volley into the net. The goal drew comparisons to his first goal for Palermo in Serie A, two months earlier, against Reggina on the opening day of the 2006–07 season. Bresciano was on the pitch on 2 February 2007, when violence broke out outside the stadium in the Catania-Palermo match. He was affected by tear gas as it drifted into the stadium and afterwards described the incident as "completely terrifying". He scored his ninth international goal against China in March 2007. A hamstring injury suffered in May caused him to miss the final round match for Palermo, Australia's friendly against Uruguay on 2 June and hampered his preparations for the 2007 AFC Asian Cup. However, he recovered in time for a warmup match against Singapore and played all of Australia's first two Asian Cup matches. He was substituted in the second half against Thailand and the quarter-final against Japan before the Socceroos' elimination on penalties. The Sydney Morning Herald rated the 71 minutes played against Japan as his best performance of the tournament, after average displays in the early matches.

Bresciano returned to the national team in February 2008 for Australia's opening World Cup qualification match against Qatar, starting the match and scoring the Socceroos third goal. He also played a full 90 minutes in the second group match away to China.

=== To England and back ===
On return from Australia's Asian Cup exit, Bresciano became a transfer target for Premier League club Manchester City. After confirmation from new Palermo manager Stefano Colantuono that he would be leaving Palermo for Manchester, the clubs agreed to a four-year contract with a transfer price of £5 million and he began training with the City squad. "I needed a new challenge and I wanted to get the excitement factor back into my game," Mark stated in confirming his desire to play in England, also citing the chance to play under Sven-Göran Eriksson as a big reason for seeking to make the switch. However, talks between the two clubs broke down in finalising the move, with the timing of the transfer fee given as the primary issue – as City sought to delay payment – and Bresciano returned to Palermo to rejoin their pre-season preparations. As the transfer deadline passed and the deal was put off indefinitely, Bresciano continued training with Palermo. He came off the bench for their opening-day loss to Roma, and remained a regular selection under new manager Francesco Guidolin, although more commonly from the substitute bench.

He came off the bench in the first match of the 2008–09 season to score a goal, although Palermo lost 3–1 to Udinese. He then established himself back in the starting line-up following the appointment of new head coach Davide Ballardini, playing both as a winger and a deep-lying forward for the rosanero, and also managing to score both goals in Palermo's second seasonal away win, a 2–0 to Sampdoria on 18 January 2009.

=== Lazio ===
On 3 July 2010, it was confirmed that Bresciano had signed for Lazio on a two-year contract. Bresciano scored his first goal for Lazio in the Coppa Italia third round win over Serie B outfit Portogruaro on 27 October 2010.

=== Al-Nasr ===
On 9 August 2011, it was announced he had signed a contract with UAE Pro League side Al-Nasr Dubai for free.

=== Al-Gharafa ===
On 6 August 2012, Bresciano joined Qatar Stars League side Al-Gharafa on a three-year contract. He unilaterally breached the contract with Al-Nasr in order to finalise the transfer.

On 4 October 2013, Bresciano was suspended for four months and fined €1,377,000 after the manner in which he transferred to Al-Gharafa from Al Nasr, putting serious doubt into his chances for a third World Cup. On 8 January, Bresciano was cleared to play for the Socceroos in the 2014 World Cup. The ban was ended on 3 February 2014. Bresciano and Al-Nasr jointly appealed to the Court of Arbitration for Sport to overturn the penalties imposed on both parties, however this appeal was dismissed.

== Style of play ==
Bresciano was one of Australia's most talented footballers and had a renowned eye for goal. He usually played his football on the left side of midfield but could also play as a forward, behind the strikers, and in a central or right midfield role. Bresciano was a versatile player who often assisted in both attack and defence and was also a set-piece specialist.

Bresciano was also popular for his "Spartacus" goal celebration, that involves the player stopping in the position from where he shot from, clenching his fists by his side and raising his chin. He stands still, usually until mobbed by his teammates coming to celebrate the goal.

== Personal life ==
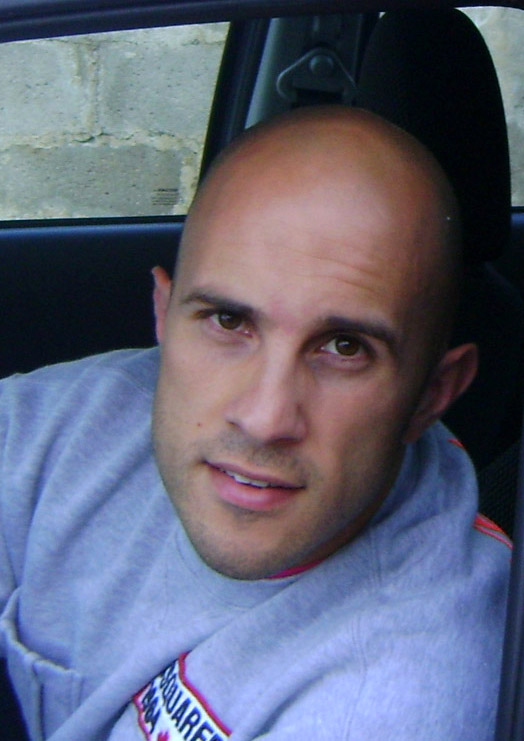
Bresciano in 2009.

=== Name ===
Bresciano's correct first name is Mark and not, as is often reported, "Marco". Interviewed for the TV documentary The Away Game, he said "In Australia, it's Marco. In Italy, it's Mark. Work that one out. My birth certificate says Mark. But I'm named after my grandfather Marco. I like Marco but not Mark-O. I prefer Mark".

=== Family ===
Bresciano's father is Italian (from Viggiano, Basilicata) and his mother Croatian (from Antonci, in Istria). His younger brother Robert currently plays for Fawkner Blues in the Victorian Premier League. He married his childhood sweetheart Renée Capitanio in May 2006 in Heidelberg, Melbourne, after proposing to her at the Romeo and Juliet House in Verona. In February 2007, the couple welcomed their first child, a daughter named Alessia and in May 2009, the couple welcomed their second child, a daughter named Montana. In 2011, they welcomed a third boy, named Benjamin.

=== Football Australia ===
From October 2019 to April 2024, Bresciano was on the board of Football Australia, the governing body for the sport in Australia. In April 2024, he resigned from the board whilst still remaining on the Football Development Committee.

In January 2024, it was reported that Bresciano was part of a consortium to purchase Perth Glory with Pelligra Group. The sale of the club to Pelligra Group was confirmed on 16 February 2024, however Bresciano's involvement is yet to be determined as he remained on the Football Australia board.

== Career statistics ==
=== Club ===
Appearances and goals by club, season and competition
Club	Season	League			Cup (Note: includes domestic cups, promotion/relegation playoffs and NSL/VPL Finals series.)		Europe		Total	
Club	Season	Division	Apps	Goals	Apps	Goals	Apps	Goals	Apps	Goals
Carlton	1997–98	NSL	10	2	4	1	0	0	14	3
Carlton	1998–99	NSL	18	4	0	0	0	0	18	4
Carlton	Total		28	6	4	1	0	0	32	7
Empoli	1999–2000	Serie B	17	2	1	0	0	0	17	2
Empoli	2000–01	Serie B	30	5	1	1	0	0	31	6
Empoli	2001–02	Serie B	33	10	0	0	0	0	33	10
Empoli	Total		80	17	1	1	0	0	81	18
Parma	2002–03	Serie A	24	0	2	0	1	0	27	0
Parma	2003–04	Serie A	33	8	2	1	2	0	37	9
Parma	2004–05	Serie A	34	3	3	0	9	0	46	3
Parma	2005–06	Serie A	32	8	3	0	0	0	35	8
Parma	Total		123	19	10	1	12	0	145	20
Palermo	2006–07	Serie A	34	6	1	0	4	0	39	6
Palermo	2007–08	Serie A	26	1	2	0	2	0	30	1
Palermo	2008–09	Serie A	26	4	1	0	0	0	27	4
Palermo	2009–10	Serie A	18	1	2	0	0	0	20	1
Palermo	Total		104	12	6	0	6	0	116	12
Lazio	2010–11	Serie A	20	0	3	1	0	0	23	1
Al-Nasr	2011–12	UAE Pro League	17	10	0	0	0	0	17	10
Al-Gharafa	2012–13	Qatar Stars League	19	1	0	0	0	0	19	1
Al-Gharafa	2013–14	Qatar Stars League	11	0	0	0	4	1	15	1
Al-Gharafa	2014–15	Qatar Stars League	21	2	0	0	0	0	21	2
Al-Gharafa	Total		51	3	0	0	4	1	54	4
Career total			423	67	24	4	22	1	469	72

=== International ===
Appearances and goals by national team and year
National team	Year	Apps	Goals
Australia U17	1997	5	5
Australia U20	1998	4	0
Australia U20	1999	3	0
Total		7	0
Australia U23	1998	3	0
Australia U23	1999	4	0
Australia U23	2000	8	0
Total		15	0
Australia	2001	6	0
Australia	2002	0	0
Australia	2003	3	1
Australia	2004	6	3
Australia	2005	7	3
Australia	2006	9	1
Australia	2007	7	1
Australia	2008	8	2
Australia	2009	6	0
Australia	2010	5	0
Australia	2011	0	0
Australia	2012	7	1
Australia	2013	9	1
Australia	2014	8	0
Australia	2015	3	0
Total		84	13

Scores and results list Australia's goal tally first.

No	Date	Venue	Opponent	Score	Result	Competition
1	7 September 2003	Madejski Stadium, Reading, England	Jamaica	1–0	2–1	Friendly
2	30 March 2004	Loftus Road, London, England	South Africa	1–0	1–0	Friendly
3	21 May 2004	Sydney Football Stadium, Sydney, Australia	Turkey	1–1	1–3	Friendly
4	29 May 2004	Hindmarsh Stadium, Adelaide, Australia	New Zealand	1–0	1–0	2004 OFC Nations Cup
5	26 March 2005	Stadium Australia, Sydney, Australia	Iraq	1–1	2–1	Friendly
6	9 October 2005	Craven Cottage, London, England	Jamaica	1–0	5–0	Friendly
7	16 November 2005	Stadium Australia, Sydney, Australia	Uruguay	1–0	1–0	2006 FIFA World Cup qualification
8	11 October 2006	Sydney Football Stadium, Sydney, Australia	Bahrain	2–0	2–0	2007 AFC Asian Cup qualification
9	24 March 2007	Yuexiushan Stadium, Guangzhou, China	China	2–0	2–0	Friendly
10	6 February 2008	Docklands Stadium, Melbourne, Australia	Qatar	3–0	3–0	2010 FIFA World Cup qualification
11	19 November 2008	Bahrain National Stadium, Manama, Bahrain	Bahrain	1–0	1–0	2010 FIFA World Cup qualification
12	15 August 2012	Easter Road, Edinburgh, Scotland	Scotland	1–0	1–3	Friendly
13	11 June 2013	Docklands Stadium, Melbourne, Australia	Jordan	1–0	4–0	2014 FIFA World Cup qualification

== Honours ==
Australia

- FIFA Confederations Cup: 3rd place, 2001
- AFC Asian Cup: 2015; runner-up, 2011
- OFC Nations Cup: 2004

Australia U20

- OFC U-19 Men's Championship: 1998
