= Mario Regueiro =

Uruguayan footballer (born 1978)

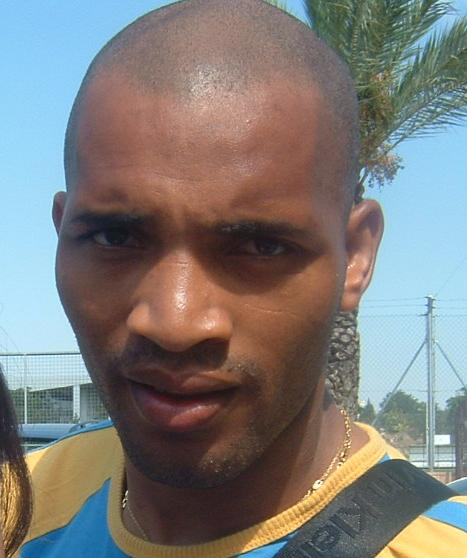
- Regueiro in 2005

Personal information
- Full name: Mario Ignacio Regueiro Pintos
- Date of birth: 14 September 1978 (age 48)
- Place of birth: Montevideo, Uruguay
- Height: 1.76 m (5 ft 9 1/2 in)
- Position: Winger

Senior career*
Years	Team	Apps	(Gls)
1996–1998	Cerro	44	(7)
1998–2000	Nacional	63	(18)
2000–2005	Racing Santander	141	(22)
2005–2008	Valencia	30	(3)
2007–2008	→ Murcia (loan)	23	(1)
2008–2009	Aris	23	(3)
2009–2010	Nacional	19	(6)
2010–2013	Lanús	96	(23)
2013	Racing Club	8	(0)
2014	Defensor	5	(1)
2014–2015	Cerro	23	(9)
Total		475	(93)

International career
2000–2007	Uruguay	29	(1)
- * Club domestic league appearances and goals

Mario Ignacio Regueiro Pintos (born 14 September 1978) is a Uruguayan retired footballer who played mainly as a left winger but also on the other flank, and even as a forward.

During his professional career he played mainly in Spain, amassing La Liga totals of 167 matches and 25 goals over the course of eight seasons. Other than in his country, he also competed in Greece and Argentina.

Regueiro represented Uruguay at the 2002 World Cup.

== Club career ==
Born in Montevideo, Regueiro started his professional career with C.A. Cerro and the local Club Nacional de Football. In 2000, he joined Racing de Santander in Spain, having made an immediate impact. In his last year, he ranked second in goals for the Cantabrians – eight, one short of Yossi Benayoun – as they barely avoided relegation.

In late June 2005, Regueiro signed with fellow La Liga club Valencia CF, arriving on a free transfer. With the Che, he was mainly used as a replacement, and also lost the vast majority of his second season due to a severe knee injury; after the campaign was over, he also acquired Spanish nationality.

In the summer of 2008, after a loan to relegated Real Murcia, Regueiro was again loaned by Valencia, now to Aris Thessaloniki F.C. for one year, only to receive his free transfer a month later and sign a three-year contract with the Greek team. However, after just one season, he was released, returning to his homeland and Nacional.

In July 2010, aged nearly 32, Regueiro moved to Argentina's Club Atlético Lanús.

== International career ==
Regueiro made 29 appearances for Uruguay, his debut coming on 8 October 2000 in a 2002 FIFA World Cup qualifier against Argentina, a 1–2 away loss. During the final stages in Japan and South Korea, he appeared twice for the nation in an eventual group stage exit, against Denmark (1–2) and Senegal (3–3).

Previously, Regueiro helped the under-20s finish second at the 1997 FIFA World Youth Championship.

== Honours ==
=== Club ===
Nacional

- Uruguayan Primera División: 1998, 2000

=== International ===
Uruguay

- FIFA U-20 World Cup: runner-up 1997
