= Darío Rodríguez (Uruguayan footballer) =

Uruguayan footballer (born 1974)

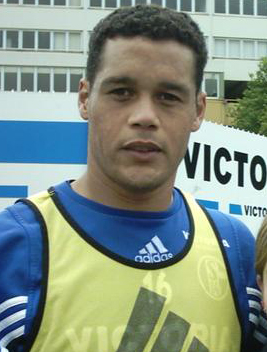

Personal information
- Full name: Octavio Darío Rodríguez Peña
- Date of birth: 17 September 1974 (age 52)
- Place of birth: Montevideo, Uruguay
- Height: 1.86 m (6 ft 1 in)
- Positions: Centre-back; left-back

Youth career
- 1979–1984: Huracan Villegas
- 1984–1989: Higos del Mar
- 1990–1994: Sud América

Senior career*
Years	Team	Apps	(Gls)
1992–1995	Sud América	23	(1)
1995–1996	Toluca	27	(1)
1997–1998	Bella Vista	30	(1)
1999–2002	Peñarol	111	(8)
2002–2008	Schalke 04	102	(6)
2008–2014	Peñarol	141	(11)
Total		434	(27)

International career
2000–2007	Uruguay	50	(3)

Managerial career
- 2016: Juventud (youth)
- 2016: Peñarol (assistant)
- 2017–2018: América de Cali (assistant)
- 2018–2019: Defensor Sporting (assistant)
- 2019–2020: Ittihad Kalba (assistant)
- 2021: Peñarol (assistant)
- 2022–2023: Uruguay (assistant)
- 2023: Peñarol
- 2025: Racing Montevideo
- * Club domestic league appearances and goals

Octavio Darío Rodríguez Peña (born 17 September 1974) is a Uruguayan former footballer who played as a centre-back and left-back. He was recently the manager of Racing Montevideo.

He is a younger brother of the footballer Héctor Rodríguez Peña.

== Club career ==
Born in Montevideo, Rodríguez has played the majority of his club football for Peñarol, and Schalke 04. His other clubs include Sud América and Bella Vista and Toluca. He left Schalke 04 in January 2008 and returned to Peñarol.

== International career ==
With Uruguay, Rodríguez was a participant at the 2002 World Cup and scored Uruguay's first goal of the tournament, a volley that curled into the top left corner of the goal. He occasionally wore the captain's captain's armband. He also played at the 2004 and 2007 Copa América tournaments.

== Style of play ==
A versatile defender, he was capable of playing as a left-back or as a left-sided central defender. Strong in the air, he was often used as distraction in set pieces.

== Career statistics ==
=== International ===
Appearances and goals by national team and year
National team	Year	Apps	Goals
Uruguay	2000	8	1
Uruguay	2001	8	0
Uruguay	2002	7	1
Uruguay	2003	1	0
Uruguay	2004	9	0
Uruguay	2005	8	1
Uruguay	2006	2	0
Uruguay	2007	7	0
Total		50	3

Scores and results list Uruguay's goal tally first, score column indicates score after each Rodríguez goal.

List of international goals scored by Darío Rodríguez
No.	Date	Venue	Opponent	Score	Result	Competition
1	18 July 2000	Estadio Centenario, Montevideo, Uruguay	Venezuela	2–1	3–1	2002 FIFA World Cup qualification
2	1 June 2002	Ulsan Munsu Football Stadium, Ulsan, South Korea	Denmark	1–1	1–2	2002 FIFA World Cup
3	12 November 2005	Estadio Centenario, Montevideo, Uruguay	Australia	1–0	1–0	2006 FIFA World Cup qualification

== Managerial statistics ==
As of match played 15 February 2025

Managerial record by team and tenure
Team	From	To	Record							
Team	From	To	G	W	D	L	GF	GA	GD	Win %
Peñarol	26 June 2023	15 November 2023	16	9	4	3	26	15	+11	56.25
Racing Montevideo	3 January 2025	17 February 2025	3	0	1	2	0	3	−3	0.00
Total			19	9	5	5	26	18	+8	47.37

== Honours ==
Schalke 04

- UEFA Intertoto Cup: 2003, 2004
- DFB-Ligapokal: 2005
