= Pablo García (footballer, born 1977) =

Uruguayan footballer (born 1977)

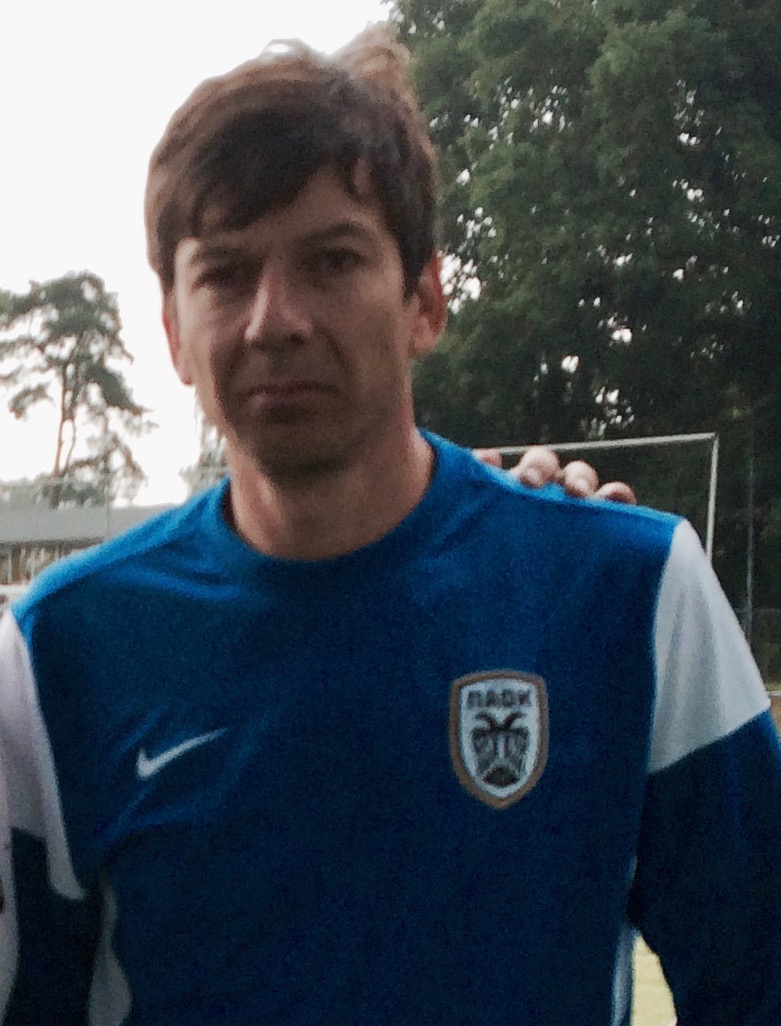
- García as PAOK coach in 2014

Personal information
- Full name: Pablo Gabriel García Pérez
- Date of birth: 11 May 1977 (age 49)
- Place of birth: Pando, Uruguay
- Height: 1.86 m (6 ft 1 in)
- Position: Defensive midfielder

Team information
- Current team: Noah (manager)

Youth career
- 1990–1996: Montevideo Wanderers

Senior career*
Years	Team	Apps	(Gls)
1996–1997	Montevideo Wanderers	35	(1)
1997–2000	Atlético Madrid B	38	(3)
1997	→ Valladolid (loan)	0	(0)
1998	→ Peñarol (loan)	9	(0)
2000–2002	Milan	5	(0)
2002	→ Venezia (loan)	14	(0)
2002–2005	Osasuna	78	(6)
2005–2008	Real Madrid	22	(0)
2006–2007	→ Celta (loan)	14	(0)
2007–2008	→ Murcia (loan)	21	(0)
2008–2013	PAOK	109	(5)
2014	Skoda Xanthi	3	(0)
Total		348	(15)

International career
1997–2007	Uruguay	66	(2)

Managerial career
- 2015–2016: PAOK U19 (assistant)
- 2016–2020: PAOK U19
- 2020–2021: PAOK
- 2021–2023: PAOK B
- 2023–2024: Panserraikos
- 2024–2025: Atromitos
- 2025–2026: APOEL
- 2026–: Noah
- * Club domestic league appearances and goals

Pablo Gabriel García Pérez (Latin American Spanish: [ˈpaβlo ɣaˈβɾjel ɣaɾˈsi.a ˈpeɾes]; (Note: In isolation, Gabriel and García are pronounced [ɡaˈβɾjel] and [ɡaɾˈsi.a] respectively.) born 11 May 1977) is a Uruguayan professional football manager and former player who played as a defensive midfielder. He is the manager of Armenian Premier League club Noah.

A player of physical approach to the game (which earned him a reputation for being a dirty player), his nickname is Canario (canary), referring to his birthplace. He spent most of his professional career in La Liga, making 135 appearances in six years in representation of four teams, but also played several seasons in Greece with PAOK.

A Uruguayan international over one decade, García appeared for the nation at the 2002 World Cup and two Copa América tournaments.

== Club career ==
=== Early career ===
Born in Pando, Canelones Department, García started his career in Montevideo Wanderers. After a six-month spell at Peñarol, he signed for Atlético Madrid, but would never make it past their reserves, being transferred to Italian giants AC Milan two years later.

After just five Serie A appearances during the 2000–01 season, García was loaned to fellow top-division club Venezia in January 2002. In spite of their relegation, he had overall good performances.

=== Spain ===
Moving to Osasuna for the 2002–03 campaign, García played intense football throughout three seasons in Navarre. In his first match, a 2–2 La Liga draw at Villarreal on 1 September 2002, he collected a booking and scored the match's final goal.

In the final of the 2005 Copa del Rey, García, already an essential midfield element for Osasuna, received a straight red card after a dangerous challenge on Real Betis' Joaquín, in an eventual 2–1 extra time loss. However, he had already caught the eye of Real Madrid which signed the player to a three-year contract, with compatriot Carlos Diogo also being purchased.

Having totalled 17 yellow – season-most– and one red cards during 2004–05, the Cup final notwithstanding, García made his Real Madrid official debut on 10 September 2005, playing 11 minutes in a 2–3 home defeat to Celta. Eventually, he won the battle for the team's first-choice holding midfielder over Thomas Gravesen, although none were an undisputed starter.

García helped Madrid to a runner-up place in the 2005–06 season, but was deemed surplus to requirements by new manager Fabio Capello and, on 29 August 2006, he agreed to a one-year loan at Celta. After an uneventful personal campaign where he was injured for most of the year and was also relegated, he returned to the Santiago Bernabéu Stadium in July 2007 to be loaned immediately again, this time to newly promoted Real Murcia.

=== PAOK ===
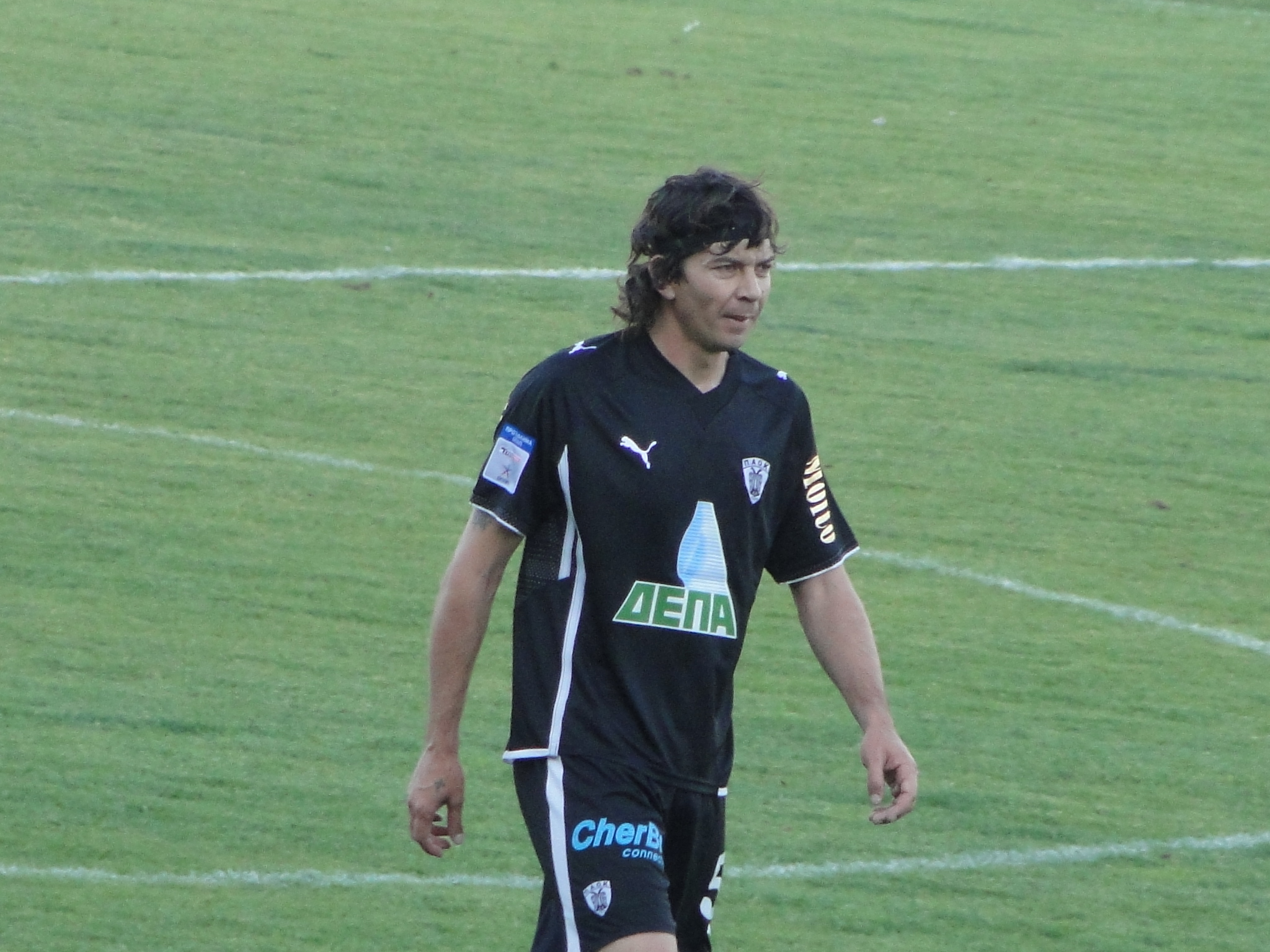
García in action for PAOK in 2010

Following another relegation, García was released by Real Madrid on 10 July 2008, and joined PAOK later that month. He quickly became a fan favorite for his tenacity, being shown three red cards in his first six games and also starring in an incident with Olympiacos player Diogo; after being hit in the face by Diogo's elbow in a confrontation during a set piece, García retaliated with a punch to the Brazilian's abdomen; both actions, surprisingly, eluded the referee's attention, but the Uruguayan eventually received a three-match ban.

García's second season was much better overall, as PAOK only conceded 16 goals in 30 matches, finishing second in the table, with him forming a stable midfield partnership with Spaniard Vitolo. On 21 February 2010, he scored in a 2–1 home win over against Panathinaikos, shortening the gap to that opposition to two points. Additionally, he renewed his link until 2012, even agreeing to a reduction in his salary in line with the club's stagnant finances.

On 23 May 2012, it was announced that the 35-year-old García renewed his contract for one more year. On 20 March of the following year, he was released by mutual consent after falling out with coach Georgios Donis.

García returned to PAOK on 4 June 2013 at the request of major shareholder Ivan Savvidis, on a one-year deal. In the following winter transfer window, however, he left for fellow Super League Greece side Skoda Xanthi, retiring after a couple of months at the age of 37 and settling in Thessaloniki.

== International career ==
A full Uruguayan international since 13 December 1997, in a King Fahd Cup match against United Arab Emirates, García quickly developed into a mainstay for the national team, going on to earn a total of 66 caps. He played all 270 minutes in the country's participation in the 2002 FIFA World Cup, but was not able to help qualify for the 2006 edition after losing a penalty shootout to Australia on 16 November 2005.

García scored a powerful finesse shot from outside the box against Venezuela in the 2007 Copa América quarter-finals, but also missed a decisive penalty against Brazil in the next round.

== Coaching career ==
On 24 May 2015, García returned to PAOK in an unspecified position. The following month, the club's sporting director Frank Arnesen announced that the former would start his managerial career as an assistant in the under-17 team.

García was undefeated for 78 matches during his spell at the helm of the under-19 side, winning three national championships in the process. On 30 October 2020, he was appointed coach of the main squad following the dismissal of Abel Ferreira, taking them from sixth place to a final runner-up position 26 points behind champions Olympiacos. The following 22 May, he won the domestic cup with a 2–1 victory against the same opposition in the final; he was fired shortly after, however, being offered a position at the reserves.

In summer 2023, García was appointed at Panserraikos also from the Greek top tier. In the cup quarter-finals, they were eliminated by PAOK 9–0 on aggregate.

On 11 May 2024, García announced he was leaving the club. Later that month, he became the manager of Atromitos in the same league after signing a one-year contract.

García subsequently worked as head coach of APOEL (Cypriot First Division) and Noah (Armenian Premier League).

== Managerial statistics ==
As of match played 10 May 2025

Managerial record by team and tenure
Team	From	To	Record				
Team	From	To	G	W	D	L	Win %
PAOK U19	10 September 2016	29 October 2020	85	71	11	3	83.53
PAOK	30 October 2020	26 May 2021	42	23	9	10	54.76
PAOK B	15 July 2021	19 June 2023	58	24	18	16	41.38
Panserraikos	4 July 2023	11 May 2024	38	11	12	15	28.95
Atromitos	31 May 2024	13 June 2025	36	13	8	15	36.11
Career total			259	142	58	59	54.83

== Honours ==
=== Player ===
Osasuna

- Copa del Rey runner-up: 2004–05

Uruguay

- FIFA U-20 World Cup runner-up: 1997
- Copa América runner-up: 1999

Individual

- PAOK MVP of the Season: 2011–12

=== Manager ===
PAOK

- Greek Football Cup: 2020–21
