= South Africa at the FIFA World Cup =

International football delegation

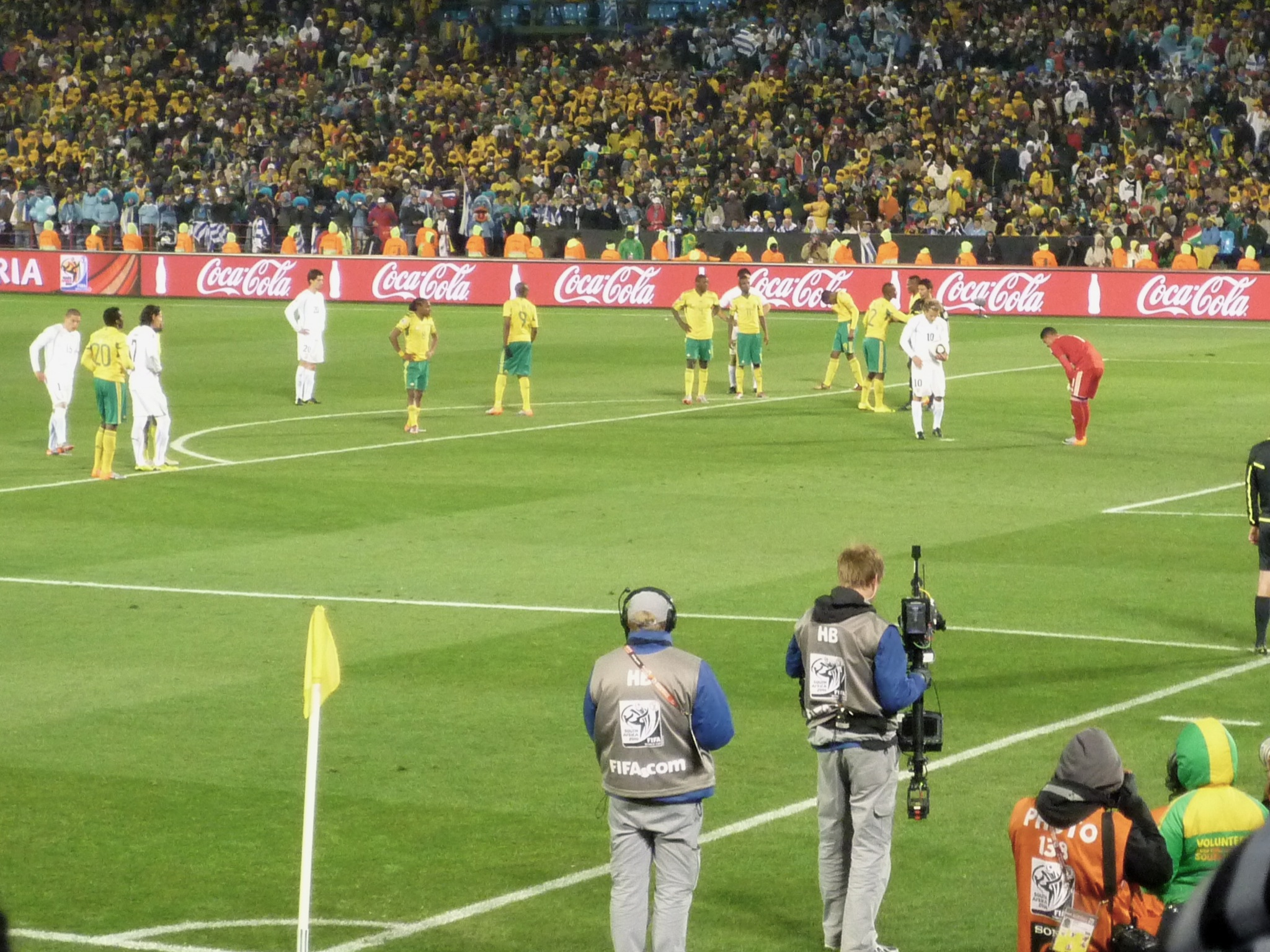
South Africa facing Uruguay at home soil in 2010

The South Africa men's national football has played at the FIFA World Cup on four occasions, in 1998, 2002, as hosts in 2010, and in 2026 in North America.

South Africa did not make it past the first round until 2026. The team's first attempt to qualify was for the 1994 FIFA World Cup, where they finished second in their group behind Nigeria. Their first appearance was in 1998, six years after they had been readmitted to the global football family. The team finished third in the group stage in both 1998 and 2002 World Cups. The team failed to qualify for the 2006 FIFA World Cup after finishing third in their qualifying group. During the 2010 World Cup on their home soil, they beat France 2–1 and drew 1–1 to Mexico, but lost 0–3 to Uruguay. They lost out on progression to the round of 16, on goal difference, becoming the first World Cup host nation to fail to advance past the group stage, a feat repeated by Qatar in 2022.

== FIFA World Cup record ==
FIFA World Cup record
Year	Round	Position	Pld	W	D*	L	GF	GA
(Uruguay) 1930	Did not enter							
(Italy) 1934	Did not enter							
(France) 1938	Did not enter							
(Brazil) 1950	Did not enter							
(Switzerland) 1954	Did not enter							
(Sweden) 1958	Did not enter							
(Chile) 1962	Did not enter							
(England) 1966	Not admitted							
(Mexico) 1970	Banned							
(West Germany) 1974	Banned							
(Argentina) 1978	Banned							
(Spain) 1982	Banned							
(Mexico) 1986	Banned							
(Italy) 1990	Banned							
(United States) 1994	Did not qualify							
(France) 1998	Group stage	24th	3	0	2	1	3	6
(South Korea) (Japan) 2002	Group stage	17th	3	1	1	1	5	5
(Germany) 2006	Did not qualify							
(South Africa) 2010	Group stage	20th	3	1	1	1	3	5
(Brazil) 2014	Did not qualify							
(Russia) 2018	Did not qualify							
(Qatar) 2022	Did not qualify							
(Canada) (Mexico) (United States) 2026	Round of 32	25th	4	1	1	2	2	4
(Morocco) (Portugal) (Spain) 2030	To be determined							
(Saudi Arabia) 2034	To be determined							
Total	Round of 32	4/23	13	3	5	5	13	20

*Denotes draws including knockout matches decided via penalty shoot-out.
**Red border colour indicates tournament was held on home soil.

South Africa's World Cup record
First Match	France 3–0 South Africa (12 June 1998; Marseille, France)
Biggest Win	South Africa 1–0 Slovenia (8 June 2002; Daegu, South Korea); France 1–2 South Africa (22 June 2010; Bloemfontein, South Africa); South Africa 1–0 South Korea (24 June 2026; Guadalupe, Mexico)
Biggest Defeat	France 3–0 South Africa (12 June 1998; Marseille, France); South Africa 0–3 Uruguay (16 June 2010; Pretoria, South Africa)
Best Result	Round of 32 in 2026
Worst Result	Group stage in 1998, 2002 and 2010

== Head-to-head record ==
Opponent	Pld	W	D	L	GF	GA	GD	Win %
Canada	1	0	0	1	0	1	−1	0.00
Czech Republic	1	0	1	0	1	1	+0	0.00
Denmark	1	0	1	0	1	1	+0	0.00
France	2	1	0	1	2	4	−2	50.00
Mexico	2	0	1	1	1	3	−2	0.00
Paraguay	1	0	1	0	2	2	+0	0.00
Saudi Arabia	1	0	1	0	2	2	+0	0.00
Slovenia	1	1	0	0	1	0	+1	100.00
South Korea	1	1	0	0	1	0	+1	100.00
Spain	1	0	0	1	2	3	−1	0.00
Uruguay	1	0	0	1	0	3	−3	0.00
Total	12	3	5	4	13	19	−6	25.00

== France 1998 ==
Pos	Team	Pld	W	D	L	GF	GA	GD	Pts	Qualification
1	France (H)	3	3	0	0	9	1	+8	9	Advance to knockout stage
2	Denmark	3	1	1	1	3	3	0	4	Advance to knockout stage
3	South Africa	3	0	2	1	3	6	−3	2	
4	Saudi Arabia	3	0	1	2	2	7	−5	1	

Source: FIFA
(H) Hosts

Head coach: (France) Philippe Troussier

No.	Pos.	Player	Date of birth (age)	Caps	Club
1	GK	Hans Vonk	30 January 1970 (aged 28)	0	(Netherlands) Heerenveen
2	DF	Themba Mnguni	16 December 1973 (aged 24)	3	(South Africa) Mamelodi Sundowns
3	DF	David Nyathi	22 March 1969 (aged 29)	35	(Switzerland) St. Gallen
4	DF	Willem Jackson	26 March 1972 (aged 26)	12	(South Africa) Orlando Pirates
5	DF	Mark Fish	14 March 1974 (aged 24)	37	(England) Bolton Wanderers
6	FW	Phil Masinga	28 June 1969 (aged 28)	41	(Italy) Bari
7	MF	Quinton Fortune	21 May 1977 (aged 21)	6	(Spain) Atlético Madrid
8	MF	Alfred Phiri	22 June 1974 (aged 23)	2	(Turkey) Vanspor
9	FW	Shaun Bartlett	31 October 1972 (aged 25)	29	(South Africa) Cape Town Spurs
10	MF	John Moshoeu	18 December 1965 (aged 32)	44	(Turkey) Fenerbahçe
11	MF	Helman Mkhalele	20 October 1969 (aged 28)	35	(Turkey) Kayserispor
12	FW	Brendan Augustine	26 October 1971 (aged 26)	26	(Austria) LASK Linz
13	FW	Delron Buckley	7 December 1977 (aged 20)	0	(Germany) VfL Bochum
14	FW	Jerry Sikhosana	8 June 1969 (aged 29)	9	(South Africa) Orlando Pirates
15	MF	Doctor Khumalo	26 June 1967 (aged 30)	43	(South Africa) Kaizer Chiefs
16	GK	Brian Baloyi	16 March 1974 (aged 24)	8	(South Africa) Kaizer Chiefs
17	FW	Benni McCarthy	12 November 1977 (aged 20)	10	(Netherlands) Ajax
18	MF	Lebohang Morula	22 December 1968 (aged 29)	0	(Turkey) Vanspor
19	DF	Lucas Radebe (c)	12 April 1969 (aged 29)	41	(England) Leeds United
20	MF	William Mokoena	31 March 1975 (aged 23)	0	(South Africa) Manning Rangers
21	DF	Pierre Issa	12 September 1975 (aged 22)	1	(France) Marseille
22	GK	Paul Evans*	28 December 1973 (aged 24)	0	(South Africa) Supersport United
23	GK	Simon Gopane*	26 December 1970 (aged 27)	1	(South Africa) Bloemfontein Celtic

- Andre Arendse (#22) was injured before the start of the tournament. His replacement, Paul Evans, was also injured shortly after arriving as a replacement. Simon Gopane was then called up, and sat on the bench for the last two matches.

=== France vs South Africa ===
12 June 1998
21:00

France	3–0	South Africa
Dugarry 36'; Issa 77' (o.g.); Henry 90+2'	Report

Stade Vélodrome, Marseille
Attendance: 55,000
Referee: Márcio Rezende de Freitas (Brazil)

GK	16	Fabien Barthez
RB	15	Lilian Thuram
CB	8	Marcel Desailly
CB	5	Laurent Blanc
LB	3	Bixente Lizarazu
CM	7	Didier Deschamps (c)	(yellow card) 53'
CM	17	Emmanuel Petit	(yellow card) 28'	(substituted off) 73'
RW	6	Youri Djorkaeff		(substituted off) 84'
AM	10	Zinedine Zidane	(yellow card) 75'
LW	12	Thierry Henry
CF	9	Stéphane Guivarc'h		(substituted off) 26'
Substitutions:
FW	21	Christophe Dugarry		(substituted on) 26'
MF	14	Alain Boghossian		(substituted on) 73'
FW	20	David Trezeguet		(substituted on) 84'
Manager:
Aimé Jacquet

GK	1	Hans Vonk
DF	3	David Nyathi
DF	4	Willem Jackson	(yellow card) 39'
DF	5	Mark Fish
DF	19	Lucas Radebe (c)
DF	21	Pierre Issa
MF	7	Quinton Fortune
MF	10	John Moshoeu
FW	6	Phil Masinga
FW	12	Brendan Augustine		(substituted off) 56'
FW	17	Benni McCarthy		(substituted off) 89'
Substitutions:
MF	11	Helman Mkhalele		(substituted on) 56'
FW	9	Shaun Bartlett		(substituted on) 89'
Manager:
Philippe Troussier

Assistant referees:
Arnaldo Pinto (Brazil)
Merere Gonzales (Trinidad and Tobago)
Fourth official:
Mario Sánchez Yanten (Chile)

=== South Africa vs Denmark ===
Benni McCarthy scored South Africa's first ever goal in the World Cup when he received the ball on the edge of the penalty box before shooting low left footed through the legs of Peter Schmeichel to level the match.

18 June 1998
17:30

South Africa	1–1	Denmark
McCarthy 51'	Report	Nielsen 12'

Stade de Toulouse, Toulouse
Attendance: 33,300
Referee: John Toro Rendón (Colombia)

GK	1	Hans Vonk
DF	3	David Nyathi	(yellow card) 28'	(substituted off) 88'
DF	5	Mark Fish
DF	19	Lucas Radebe (c)	(yellow card) 73'
DF	21	Pierre Issa	(yellow card) 63'
MF	7	Quinton Fortune
MF	10	John Moshoeu
MF	11	Helman Mkhalele
FW	9	Shaun Bartlett		(substituted off) 77'
FW	12	Brendan Augustine		(substituted off) 46'
FW	17	Benni McCarthy
Substitutions:
MF	8	Alfred Phiri	(yellow card) 65' (red card) 68'	(substituted on) 46'
FW	6	Phil Masinga		(substituted on) 77'
FW	13	Delron Buckley		(substituted on) 88'
Manager:
Philippe Troussier

GK	1	Peter Schmeichel	(yellow card) 57'
DF	2	Michael Schjønberg	(yellow card) 23'	(substituted off) 82'
DF	3	Marc Rieper
DF	4	Jes Høgh	(yellow card) 56'
DF	6	Thomas Helveg
DF	12	Søren Colding
MF	7	Allan Nielsen
MF	10	Michael Laudrup (c)		(substituted off) 58'
MF	21	Martin Jørgensen
FW	11	Brian Laudrup
FW	19	Ebbe Sand		(substituted off) 58'
Substitutions:
DF	5	Jan Heintze		(substituted on) 58'
FW	9	Miklos Molnar	(red card) 66'	(substituted on) 58'
MF	14	Morten Wieghorst	(red card) 85'	(substituted on) 82'
Manager:
Bo Johansson

Assistant referees:
Jorge Luis Arango (Colombia)
Celestino Galván (Paraguay)
Fourth official:
Epifanio González (Paraguay)

=== South Africa vs Saudi Arabia ===
24 June 1998
16:00

South Africa	2–2	Saudi Arabia
Bartlett 18', 90+3' (pen.)	Report	Al-Jaber 45+2' (pen.); Al-Thunayan 74' (pen.)

Parc Lescure, Bordeaux
Attendance: 31,800
Referee: Mario Sánchez (Chile)

GK	1	Hans Vonk
DF	3	David Nyathi
DF	4	Willem Jackson		(substituted off) 46'
DF	5	Mark Fish
DF	19	Lucas Radebe (c)	(yellow card) 65'
DF	21	Pierre Issa
MF	7	Quinton Fortune	(yellow card) 38'	(substituted off) 67'
MF	10	John Moshoeu
MF	11	Helman Mkhalele
FW	9	Shaun Bartlett
FW	17	Benni McCarthy		(substituted off) 46'
Substitutions:
FW	13	Delron Buckley		(substituted on) 46'
FW	14	Jerry Sikhosana		(substituted on) 46'
MF	15	Doctor Khumalo		(substituted on) 67'
Manager:
Philippe Troussier

GK	1	Mohamed Al-Deayea
DF	2	Mohammed Al-Jahani
DF	4	Abdullah Zubromawi
DF	13	Hussein Sulaimani
MF	6	Fuad Amin (c)
MF	16	Khamis Al-Owairan	(yellow card) 30'
MF	18	Nawaf Al-Temyat
MF	20	Hamzah Saleh
FW	9	Sami Al-Jaber
FW	11	Fahad Al-Mehallel		(substituted off) 64'
FW	15	Yousuf Al-Thunayan		(substituted off) 81'
Substitutions:
MF	7	Ibrahim Al-Shahrani		(substituted on) 64'
MF	12	Ibrahim Al-Harbi		(substituted on) 81'
Manager:
Mohammed Al-Kharashy

Assistant referees:
Owen Powell (Jamaica)
Eddie Foley (Ireland)
Fourth official:
Alberto Tejada Noriega (Peru)

== Korea/Japan 2002 ==
Pos	Team	Pld	W	D	L	GF	GA	GD	Pts	Qualification
1	Spain	3	3	0	0	9	4	+5	9	Advance to knockout stage
2	Paraguay	3	1	1	1	6	6	0	4	Advance to knockout stage
3	South Africa	3	1	1	1	5	5	0	4	
4	Slovenia	3	0	0	3	2	7	−5	0	

Source: FIFA
Rules for classification: Tie-breaking criteria

Head coach: Jomo Sono

No.	Pos.	Player	Date of birth (age)	Caps	Club
1	GK	Hans Vonk	30 January 1970 (aged 32)	29	(Netherlands) Heerenveen
2	DF	Cyril Nzama	26 June 1974 (aged 27)	19	(South Africa) Kaizer Chiefs
3	DF	Bradley Carnell	21 January 1977 (aged 25)	21	(Germany) VfB Stuttgart
4	DF	Aaron Mokoena	25 November 1980 (aged 21)	22	(Belgium) Germinal Beerschot
5	DF	Jacob Lekgetho	24 March 1974 (aged 28)	15	(Russia) Lokomotiv Moscow
6	MF	MacBeth Sibaya	25 November 1977 (aged 24)	9	(South Africa) Jomo Cosmos
7	MF	Quinton Fortune	21 May 1977 (aged 25)	39	(England) Manchester United
8	MF	Thabo Mngomeni	24 June 1969 (aged 32)	37	(South Africa) Orlando Pirates
9	MF	MacDonald Mukansi	26 May 1975 (aged 27)	7	(Bulgaria) Lokomotiv Sofia
10	MF	Bennett Mnguni	18 March 1974 (aged 28)	9	(Russia) Lokomotiv Moscow
11	MF	Jabu Pule	11 July 1980 (aged 21)	9	(South Africa) Kaizer Chiefs
12	MF	Teboho Mokoena	10 July 1974 (aged 27)	10	(Switzerland) St. Gallen
13	DF	Pierre Issa	12 September 1975 (aged 26)	41	(England) Watford
14	FW	Siyabonga Nomvethe	2 December 1977 (aged 24)	30	(Italy) Udinese
15	MF	Sibusiso Zuma	23 June 1975 (aged 26)	22	(Denmark) Copenhagen
16	GK	André Arendse	27 June 1967 (aged 34)	49	(South Africa) Santos Cape Town
17	FW	Benni McCarthy	12 November 1977 (aged 24)	43	(Portugal) Porto
18	MF	Delron Buckley	7 December 1977 (aged 24)	32	(Germany) VfL Bochum
19	DF	Lucas Radebe (c)	12 April 1969 (aged 33)	65	(England) Leeds United
20	GK	Calvin Marlin	20 April 1976 (aged 26)	2	(South Africa) Ajax Cape Town
21	MF	Steven Pienaar	17 March 1982 (aged 20)	0	(Netherlands) Ajax
22	DF	Thabang Molefe	11 April 1979 (aged 23)	5	(South Africa) Jomo Cosmos
23	FW	George Koumantarakis	27 March 1974 (aged 28)	6	(Switzerland) Basel

=== Paraguay vs South Africa ===
2 June 2002
16:30

Paraguay	2–2	South Africa
Santa Cruz 39'; Arce 55'	Report	Mokoena 63'; Fortune 90+1' (pen.)

Busan Asian Main Stadium, Busan
Attendance: 25,186
Referee: Ľuboš Micheľ (Slovakia)

Paraguay	South Africa

GK	22	Ricardo Tavarelli	(yellow card) 90'
CB	18	Julio César Cáceres	(yellow card) 35'
CB	5	Celso Ayala
CB	4	Carlos Gamarra (c)
RWB	2	Francisco Arce
LWB	21	Denis Caniza	(yellow card) 65'
CM	10	Roberto Miguel Acuña
CM	6	Estanislao Struway		(substituted off) 86'
CM	8	Guido Alvarenga		(substituted off) 66'
AM	11	Jorge Campos		(substituted off) 73'
CF	9	Roque Santa Cruz
Substitutions:
MF	14	Diego Gavilán		(substituted on) 66'
MF	16	Gustavo Morínigo		(substituted on) 73'
DF	17	Juan Carlos Franco	(yellow card) 90+3'	(substituted on) 86'
Manager:
(Italy) Cesare Maldini

GK	16	Andre Arendse
RB	4	Aaron Mokoena	(yellow card) 3'
CB	13	Pierre Issa	(yellow card) 9'	(substituted off) 27'
CB	19	Lucas Radebe (c)
LB	3	Bradley Carnell
RM	2	Cyril Nzama
CM	12	Teboho Mokoena
CM	6	MacBeth Sibaya
LM	7	Quinton Fortune
CF	17	Benni McCarthy	(yellow card) 38'	(substituted off) 78'
CF	15	Sibusiso Zuma	(yellow card) 45+2'
Substitutions:
MF	9	MacDonald Mukasi		(substituted on) 27'
FW	23	George Koumantarakis		(substituted on) 78'
Manager:
Jomo Sono

Man of the Match:
Francisco Arce (Paraguay)

Assistant referees:
Igor Šramka (Slovakia)
Curtis Charles (Antigua and Barbuda)
Fourth official:
Hugh Dallas (Scotland)

=== South Africa vs Slovenia ===
Siyabonga Nomvethe scored the only goal of the game, in the fourth minute. A free kick from Quinton Fortune on the left came to Nomvethe and although he mistimed his header, the ball cannoned into the net off his thigh.

8 June 2002
15:30

South Africa	1–0	Slovenia
Nomvethe 4'	Report

Daegu World Cup Stadium, Daegu
Attendance: 47,226
Referee: Ángel Sánchez (Argentina)

South Africa	Slovenia

GK	16	Andre Arendse
RB	2	Cyril Nzama
CB	4	Aaron Mokoena
CB	19	Lucas Radebe (c)	(yellow card) 12'
LB	3	Bradley Carnell
RM	15	Sibusiso Zuma
CM	6	MacBeth Sibaya
CM	12	Teboho Mokoena
LM	7	Quinton Fortune		(substituted off) 84'
CF	14	Siyabonga Nomvethe		(substituted off) 71'
CF	17	Benni McCarthy		(substituted off) 80'
Substitutions:
MF	18	Delron Buckley		(substituted on) 71'
FW	23	George Koumantarakis		(substituted on) 80'
MF	11	Jabu Pule		(substituted on) 84'
Manager:
Jomo Sono

GK	1	Marko Simeunovič
CB	3	Željko Milinovič	(yellow card) 52'
CB	4	Muamer Vugdalič	(yellow card) 35'
CB	6	Aleksander Knavs		(substituted off) 60'
RM	7	Đoni Novak
CM	11	Miran Pavlin	(yellow card) 75'
CM	8	Aleš Čeh (c)	(yellow card) 62'
LM	19	Amir Karić
AM	18	Milenko Ačimovič		(substituted off) 60'
CF	21	Sebastjan Cimirotič		(substituted off) 41'
CF	13	Mladen Rudonja
Substitutions:
FW	9	Milan Osterc		(substituted on) 41'
MF	20	Nastja Čeh		(substituted on) 60'
DF	22	Spasoje Bulajič		(substituted on) 60'
Manager:
Srečko Katanec

Man of the Match:
Quinton Fortune (South Africa)

Assistant referees:
Jorge Rattalino (Argentina)
Ali Al Traifi (Saudi Arabia)
Fourth official:
Jan Wegereef (Netherlands)

=== South Africa vs Spain ===
12 June 2002
20:30

South Africa	2–3	Spain
McCarthy 31'; Radebe 53'	Report	Raúl 4', 56'; Mendieta 45+1'

Daejeon World Cup Stadium, Daejeon
Attendance: 31,024
Referee: Saad Mane (Kuwait)

South Africa	Spain

GK	16	Andre Arendse
RB	2	Cyril Nzama	(yellow card) 16'
CB	4	Aaron Mokoena	(yellow card) 81'
CB	19	Lucas Radebe (c)		(substituted off) 80'
LB	3	Bradley Carnell	(yellow card) 67'
RM	15	Sibusiso Zuma
CM	6	MacBeth Sibaya
CM	12	Teboho Mokoena
LM	7	Quinton Fortune		(substituted off) 83'
CF	17	Benni McCarthy
CF	14	Siyabonga Nomvethe	(yellow card) 69'	(substituted off) 74'
Substitutions:
FW	23	George Koumantarakis		(substituted on) 74'
DF	22	Thabang Molefe		(substituted on) 80'
DF	5	Jacob Lekgetho		(substituted on) 83'
Manager:
Jomo Sono

GK	1	Iker Casillas
RB	2	Curro Torres
CB	4	Iván Helguera
CB	20	Miguel Ángel Nadal (c)
LB	15	Enrique Romero
RM	22	Joaquín
CM	19	Xavi
CM	14	David Albelda	(substituted off) 53'
LM	16	Gaizka Mendieta
CF	7	Raúl	(substituted off) 82'
CF	9	Fernando Morientes	(substituted off) 77'
Substitutions:
MF	18	Sergio	(substituted on) 53'
FW	12	Albert Luque	(substituted on) 77'
MF	21	Luis Enrique	(substituted on) 82'
Manager:
José Antonio Camacho

Man of the Match:
Raúl (Spain)

Assistant referees:
Jorge Rattalino (Argentina)
Awni Hassouneh (Jordan)
Fourth official:
Mohamed Guezzaz (Morocco)

== South Africa 2010 ==
Pos	Team	Pld	W	D	L	GF	GA	GD	Pts	Qualification
1	Uruguay	3	2	1	0	4	0	+4	7	Advance to knockout stage
2	Mexico	3	1	1	1	3	2	+1	4	Advance to knockout stage
3	South Africa (H)	3	1	1	1	3	5	−2	4	
4	France	3	0	1	2	1	4	−3	1	

Source: FIFA
Rules for classification: Tie-breaking criteria
(H) Hosts

Coach: (Brazil) Carlos Alberto Parreira

No.	Pos.	Player	Date of birth (age)	Caps	Club
1	GK	Moeneeb Josephs	19 May 1980 (aged 30)	17	(South Africa) Orlando Pirates
2	DF	Siboniso Gaxa	6 April 1984 (aged 26)	37	(South Africa) Mamelodi Sundowns
3	DF	Tsepo Masilela	5 May 1985 (aged 25)	31	(Israel) Maccabi Haifa
4	DF	Aaron Mokoena (c)	25 November 1980 (aged 29)	101	(England) Portsmouth
5	DF	Anele Ngcongca	20 October 1987 (aged 22)	5	(Belgium) Genk
6	MF	MacBeth Sibaya	25 November 1977 (aged 32)	58	(Russia) Rubin Kazan
7	MF	Lance Davids	11 April 1985 (aged 25)	22	(South Africa) Ajax Cape Town
8	MF	Siphiwe Tshabalala	25 September 1984 (aged 25)	48	(South Africa) Kaizer Chiefs
9	FW	Katlego Mphela	29 November 1984 (aged 25)	31	(South Africa) Mamelodi Sundowns
10	MF	Steven Pienaar	17 March 1982 (aged 28)	50	(England) Everton
11	MF	Teko Modise	22 December 1982 (aged 27)	52	(South Africa) Orlando Pirates
12	MF	Reneilwe Letsholonyane	9 June 1982 (aged 28)	13	(South Africa) Kaizer Chiefs
13	MF	Kagisho Dikgacoi	24 November 1984 (aged 25)	37	(England) Fulham
14	DF	Matthew Booth	14 March 1977 (aged 33)	27	(South Africa) Mamelodi Sundowns
15	DF	Lucas Thwala	19 October 1981 (aged 28)	24	(South Africa) Orlando Pirates
16	GK	Itumeleng Khune	20 June 1987 (aged 22)	27	(South Africa) Kaizer Chiefs
17	FW	Bernard Parker	16 March 1986 (aged 24)	28	(Netherlands) Twente
18	FW	Siyabonga Nomvethe	2 December 1977 (aged 32)	76	(South Africa) Moroka Swallows
19	MF	Surprise Moriri	20 March 1980 (aged 30)	34	(South Africa) Mamelodi Sundowns
20	DF	Bongani Khumalo	6 January 1987 (aged 23)	14	(South Africa) Supersport United
21	DF	Siyabonga Sangweni	29 September 1981 (aged 28)	8	(South Africa) Golden Arrows
22	GK	Shu-Aib Walters	26 December 1981 (aged 28)	0	(South Africa) Maritzburg United
23	MF	Thanduyise Khuboni	23 May 1986 (aged 24)	9	(South Africa) Golden Arrows

=== South Africa vs Mexico ===
South Africa vs Mexico was the opening match of the World Cup, held on 11 June 2010. It was described as an "enthralling" and "pulsating" match. South Africa opened the scoring in the 55th minute after Siphiwe Tshabalala scored off a pass through Mexico's defence by Teko Modise. Mexico's captain Rafael Márquez equalised following a corner kick in the 79th minute. In the final minutes of the match, Katlego Mphela almost scored a winning goal for South Africa, but his shot bounced off the post.

Tshabalala was named as the man of the match. South Africa's coach, Carlos Alberto Parreira called the result "fair", while Mexico's coach Javier Aguirre stated "we could have won, we could have lost".

11 June 2010
16:00

South Africa	1–1	Mexico
Tshabalala 55'		Márquez 79'

Soccer City, Johannesburg
Attendance: 84,490
Referee: Ravshan Irmatov (Uzbekistan)

South Africa	Mexico

GK	16	Itumeleng Khune
RB	2	Siboniso Gaxa
CB	4	Aaron Mokoena (c)
CB	20	Bongani Khumalo
LB	15	Lucas Thwala		(substituted off) 46'
RM	8	Siphiwe Tshabalala
CM	13	Kagisho Dikgacoi	(yellow card) 27'
CM	12	Reneilwe Letsholonyane
LW	11	Teko Modise
SS	10	Steven Pienaar		(substituted off) 83'
CF	9	Katlego Mphela
Substitutions:
DF	3	Tsepo Masilela	(yellow card) 70'	(substituted on) 46'
FW	17	Bernard Parker		(substituted on) 83'
Manager:
(Brazil) Carlos Alberto Parreira

GK	1	Óscar Pérez
RB	12	Paul Aguilar		(substituted off) 55'
CB	5	Ricardo Osorio
CB	2	Francisco Javier Rodríguez
LB	3	Carlos Salcido
DM	4	Rafael Márquez
CM	16	Efraín Juárez	(yellow card) 18'
CM	6	Gerardo Torrado (c)	(yellow card) 57'
RW	17	Giovani dos Santos
LW	11	Carlos Vela		(substituted off) 69'
CF	9	Guillermo Franco		(substituted off) 73'
Substitutions:
MF	18	Andrés Guardado		(substituted on) 55'
FW	10	Cuauhtémoc Blanco		(substituted on) 69'
FW	14	Javier Hernández		(substituted on) 73'
Manager:
Javier Aguirre

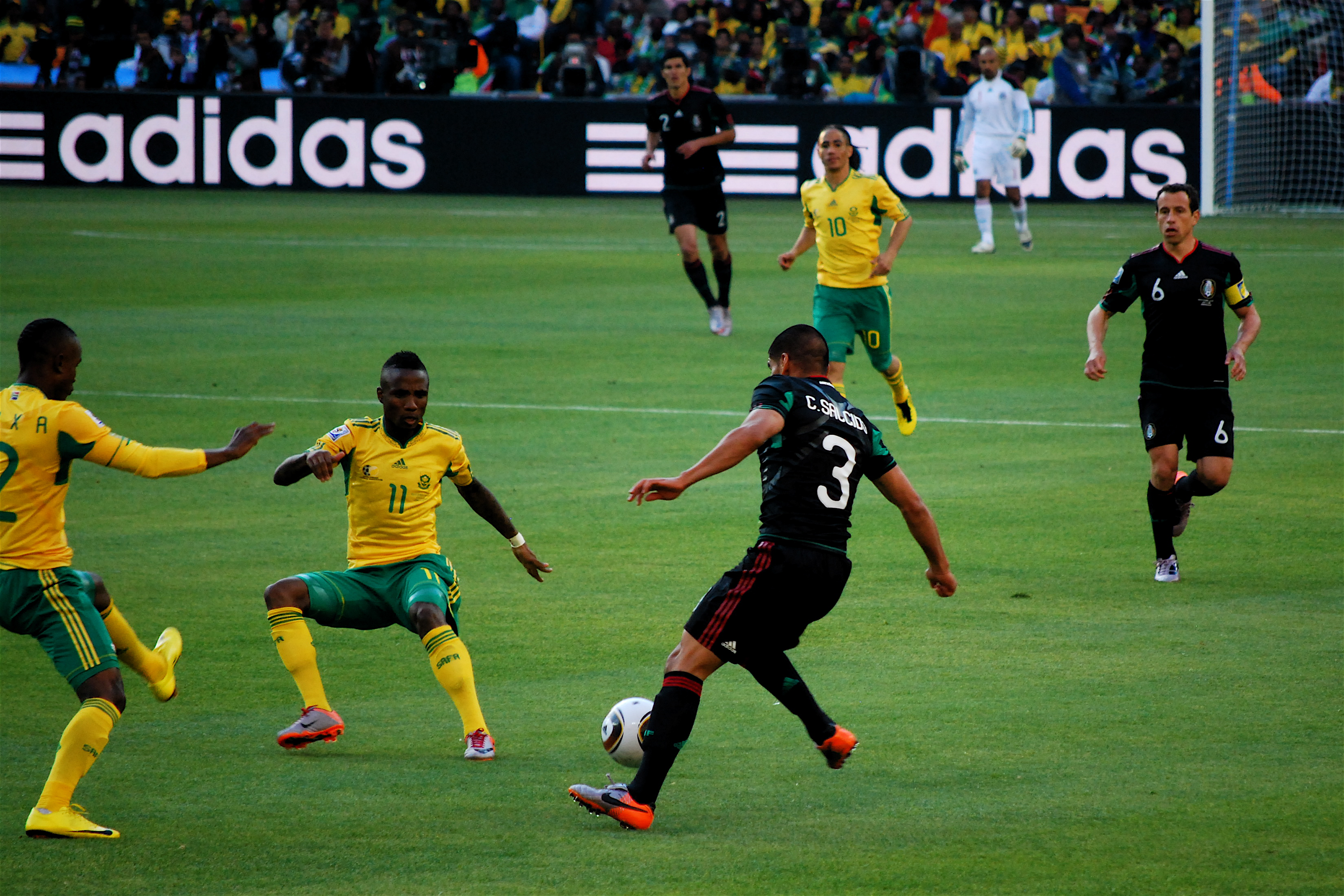
South Africa vs Mexico

Man of the Match:
Siphiwe Tshabalala (South Africa)

Assistant referees:
Rafael Ilyasov (Uzbekistan)
Bakhadyr Kochkarov (Kyrgyzstan)
Fourth official:
Subkhiddin Mohd Salleh (Malaysia)
Fifth official:
Mu Yuxin (China)

=== South Africa vs Uruguay ===
16 June 2010
20:30

South Africa	0–3	Uruguay
		Forlán 24', 80' (pen.); Á. Pereira 90+5'

Loftus Versfeld Stadium, Pretoria
Attendance: 42,658
Referee: Massimo Busacca (Switzerland)

South Africa	Uruguay

GK	16	Itumeleng Khune	(red card) 76'
RB	2	Siboniso Gaxa
CB	4	Aaron Mokoena (c)
CB	20	Bongani Khumalo
LB	3	Tsepo Masilela
RM	8	Siphiwe Tshabalala
CM	13	Kagisho Dikgacoi	(yellow card) 42'
CM	12	Reneilwe Letsholonyane		(substituted off) 57'
LW	11	Teko Modise
SS	10	Steven Pienaar	(yellow card) 6'	(substituted off) 79'
CF	9	Katlego Mphela
Substitutions:
MF	19	Surprise Moriri		(substituted on) 57'
GK	1	Moeneeb Josephs		(substituted on) 79'
Manager:
(Brazil) Carlos Alberto Parreira

GK	1	Fernando Muslera
RB	16	Maxi Pereira
CB	2	Diego Lugano (c)
CB	3	Diego Godín
LB	4	Jorge Fucile	(substituted off) 71'
DM	15	Diego Pérez	(substituted off) 90'
RM	17	Egidio Arévalo Ríos
LM	11	Álvaro Pereira
AM	10	Diego Forlán
CF	9	Luis Suárez
CF	7	Edinson Cavani	(substituted off) 89'
Substitutions:
MF	20	Álvaro Fernández	(substituted on) 71'
FW	21	Sebastián Fernández	(substituted on) 89'
MF	5	Walter Gargano	(substituted on) 90'
Manager:
Óscar Tabárez

Man of the Match:
Diego Forlán (Uruguay)

Assistant referees:
Matthias Arnet (Switzerland)
Francesco Buragina (Switzerland)
Fourth official:
Wolfgang Stark (Germany)
Fifth official:
Jan-Hendrik Salver (Germany)

=== France vs South Africa ===
Two teams have met three times but recently in the 1998 FIFA World Cup won by France 3–0.

Bongani Khumalo scored the first goal to make it 1–0 in 25th minute Yoann Gourcuff was shown a red card after a serious foul, Katlego Mphela made it 2–0 in half-time, South Africa made several chances in second half, Hugo Lloris saved Katlego Mphela's shot to make a third goal, Bacary Sagna made a back pass to the French player Florent Malouda scored a goal to make it 2–1 from an assist by Franck Ribéry, South Africa made even more chances in second half, 2-1 was the final score of the match. France were eliminated from the World Cup with a single point in the Group stage.

Although South Africa became the first host nation to exit the World Cup group stage in history.

22 June 2010
16:00

France	1–2	South Africa
Malouda 70'		Khumalo 20'; Mphela 37'

Free State Stadium, Bloemfontein
Attendance: 39,415
Referee: Óscar Ruiz (Colombia)

France	South Africa

GK	1	Hugo Lloris
RB	2	Bacary Sagna
CB	5	William Gallas
CB	17	Sébastien Squillaci
LB	22	Gaël Clichy
CM	18	Alou Diarra (c)		(substituted off) 82'
CM	19	Abou Diaby	(yellow card) 71'
RW	11	André-Pierre Gignac		(substituted off) 46'
AM	8	Yoann Gourcuff	(red card) 25'
LW	7	Franck Ribéry
CF	9	Djibril Cissé		(substituted off) 55'
Substitutions:
MF	15	Florent Malouda		(substituted on) 46'
FW	12	Thierry Henry		(substituted on) 55'
FW	10	Sidney Govou		(substituted on) 82'
Manager:
Raymond Domenech

GK	1	Moeneeb Josephs
RB	5	Anele Ngcongca	(substituted off) 55'
CB	4	Aaron Mokoena (c)
CB	20	Bongani Khumalo
LB	3	Tsepo Masilela
CM	6	MacBeth Sibaya
CM	23	Thanduyise Khuboni	(substituted off) 78'
RW	10	Steven Pienaar
LW	8	Siphiwe Tshabalala
CF	9	Katlego Mphela
CF	17	Bernard Parker	(substituted off) 68'
Substitutions:
DF	2	Siboniso Gaxa	(substituted on) 55'
FW	18	Siyabonga Nomvethe	(substituted on) 68'
MF	11	Teko Modise	(substituted on) 78'
Manager:
(Brazil) Carlos Alberto Parreira

Man of the Match:
Katlego Mphela (South Africa)

Assistant referees:
Abraham González (Colombia)
Humberto Clavijo (Colombia)
Fourth official:
Héctor Baldassi (Argentina)
Fifth official:
Ricardo Casas (Argentina)

== Canada/Mexico/United States 2026 ==
=== Group A ===
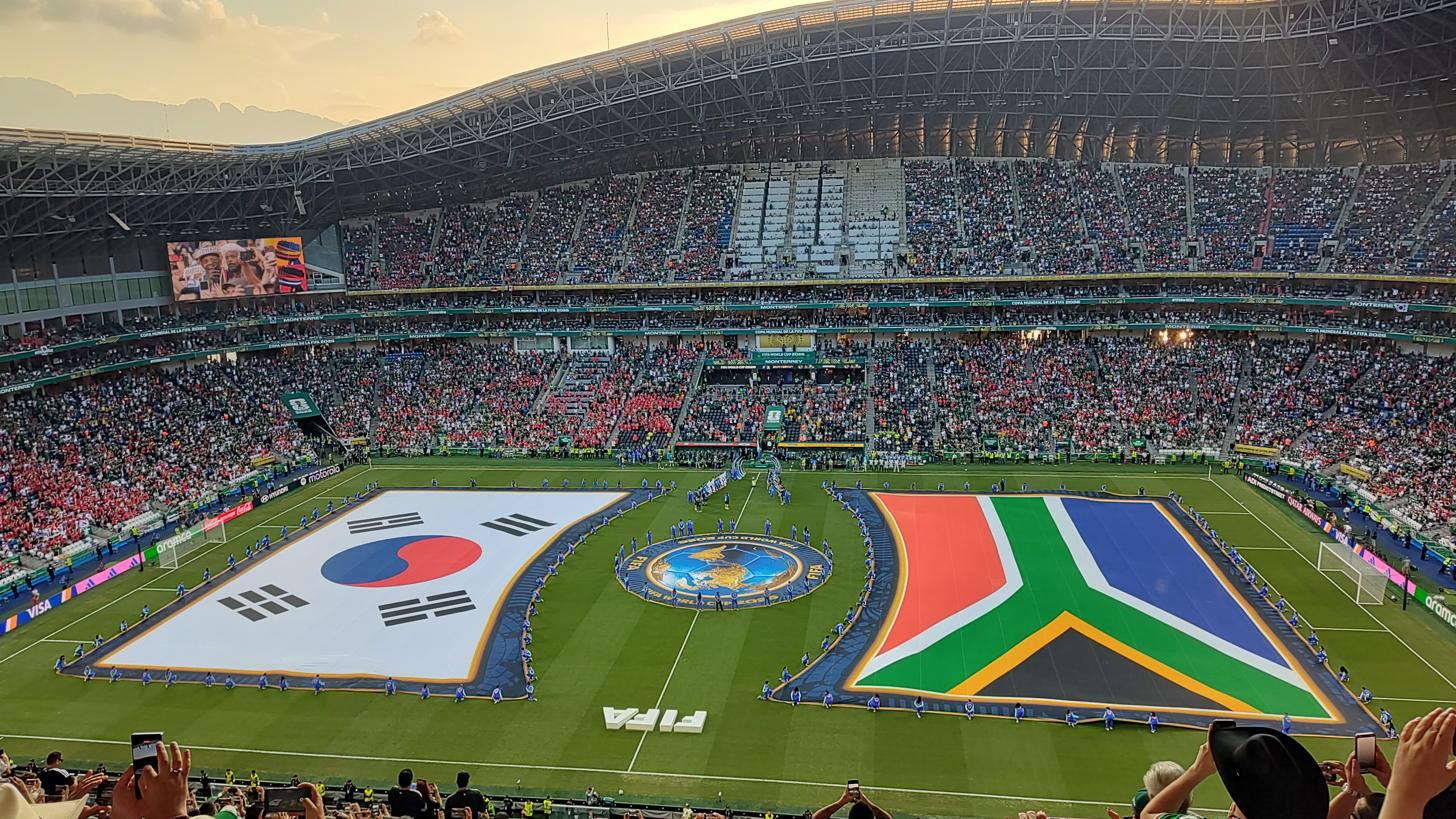
South Korea vs South Africa match in Monterrey, Mexico

Pos	Team	Pld	W	D	L	GF	GA	GD	Pts	Qualification
1	Mexico (H)	3	3	0	0	6	0	+6	9	Advance to knockout stage
2	South Africa	3	1	1	1	2	3	−1	4	Advance to knockout stage
3	South Korea	3	1	0	2	2	3	−1	3	
4	Czech Republic	3	0	1	2	2	6	−4	1	

Source: FIFA
Rules for classification: Group stage tiebreakers
(H) Hosts
June 11, 2026
1:00 p.m. UTC−6

Mexico	2–0	South Africa
Quiñones 9'; Jiménez 67'	(Note: "Mexico vs South Africa | First Stage | FIFA World Cup 2026". FIFA. Retrieved June 11, 2026.; "Match Report – Group A – Mexico v. South Africa". FIFA. June 11, 2026. Retrieved June 11, 2026.; "Post match summary report – Group A – Mexico v. South Africa". FIFA. June 12, 2026. Retrieved June 12, 2026.)

Estadio Azteca, Mexico City
Attendance: 80,824
Referee: Wilton Sampaio (Brazil)

June 18, 2026
12:00 p.m. UTC−4

Czech Republic	1–1	South Africa
Sadílek 6'	(Note: "Czech Republic vs South Africa | First Stage | FIFA World Cup 2026". FIFA. Retrieved June 18, 2026.; "Match Report – Group A – Czechia v. South Africa". FIFA. June 18, 2026. Retrieved June 18, 2026.; "Post match summary report – Group A – Czechia v. South Africa". FIFA. June 18, 2026. Retrieved June 19, 2026.)	Mokoena 83' (pen.)

Mercedes-Benz Stadium, Atlanta
Attendance: 67,442
Referee: Tori Penso (United States)

June 24, 2026
7:00 p.m. UTC−6

South Africa	1–0	South Korea
Maseko 63'	(Note: "South Africa vs Korea Republic | First Stage | FIFA World Cup 2026". FIFA. Retrieved June 25, 2026.; "Match Report – Group A – South Africa v. Korea Republic". FIFA. June 25, 2026. Retrieved June 25, 2026.; "Post match summary report – Group A – South Africa v. Korea Republic". FIFA. June 25, 2026. Retrieved June 25, 2026.)

Estadio BBVA, Guadalupe
Attendance: 51,243
Referee: Facundo Tello (Argentina)

=== Knockout stage ===
Round of 32

June 28, 2026
12:00 p.m. UTC−7

South Africa	0–1	Canada
	(Note: "South Africa vs Canada | Round of 32 | FIFA World Cup 2026". FIFA. Retrieved June 28, 2026.; "Match Report – Round of 32 – South Africa v. Canada". FIFA. June 28, 2026. Retrieved June 28, 2026.; "Post match summary report – Round of 32 – South Africa v. Canada". FIFA. June 29, 2026. Retrieved June 29, 2026.)	Eustáquio 90+2'

SoFi Stadium, Inglewood
Attendance: 69,237
Referee: João Pinheiro (Portugal)

== Player records ==
=== Most appearances ===
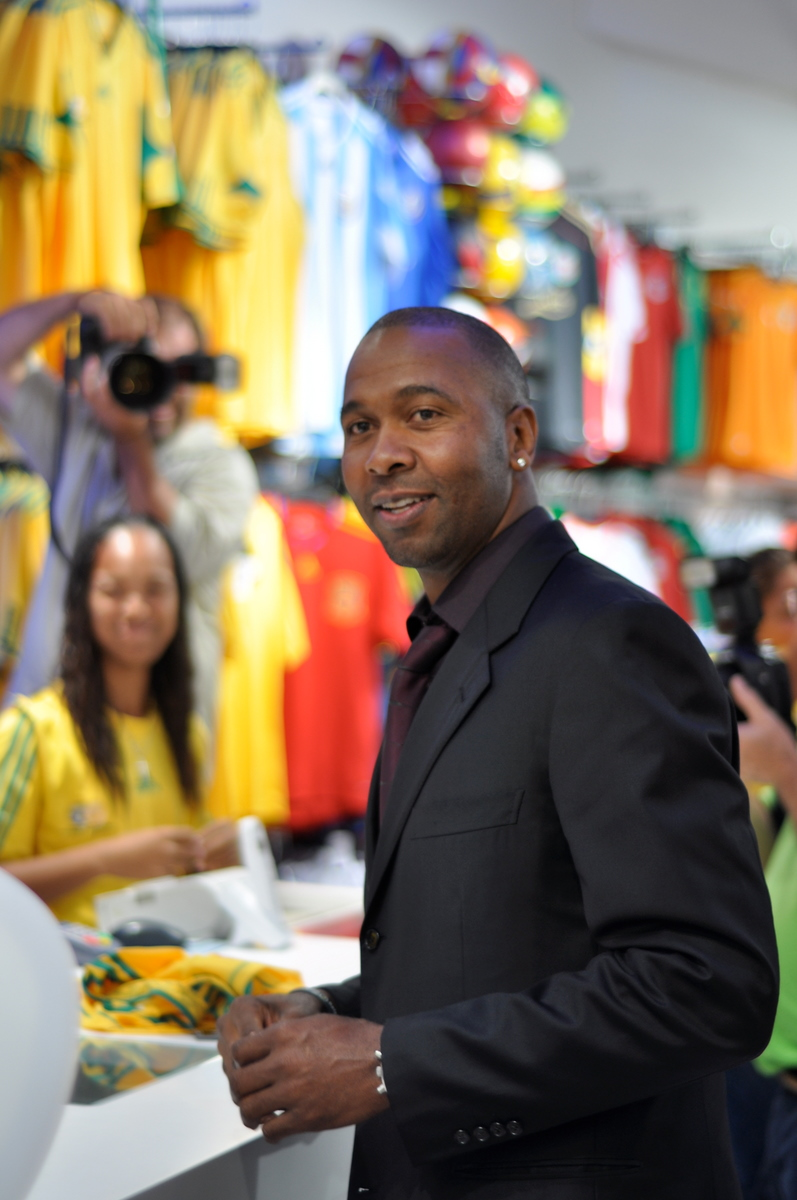
Lucas Radebe captained South Africa both in 1998 and in 2002. The central defender is South Africa's joint record World Cup player.

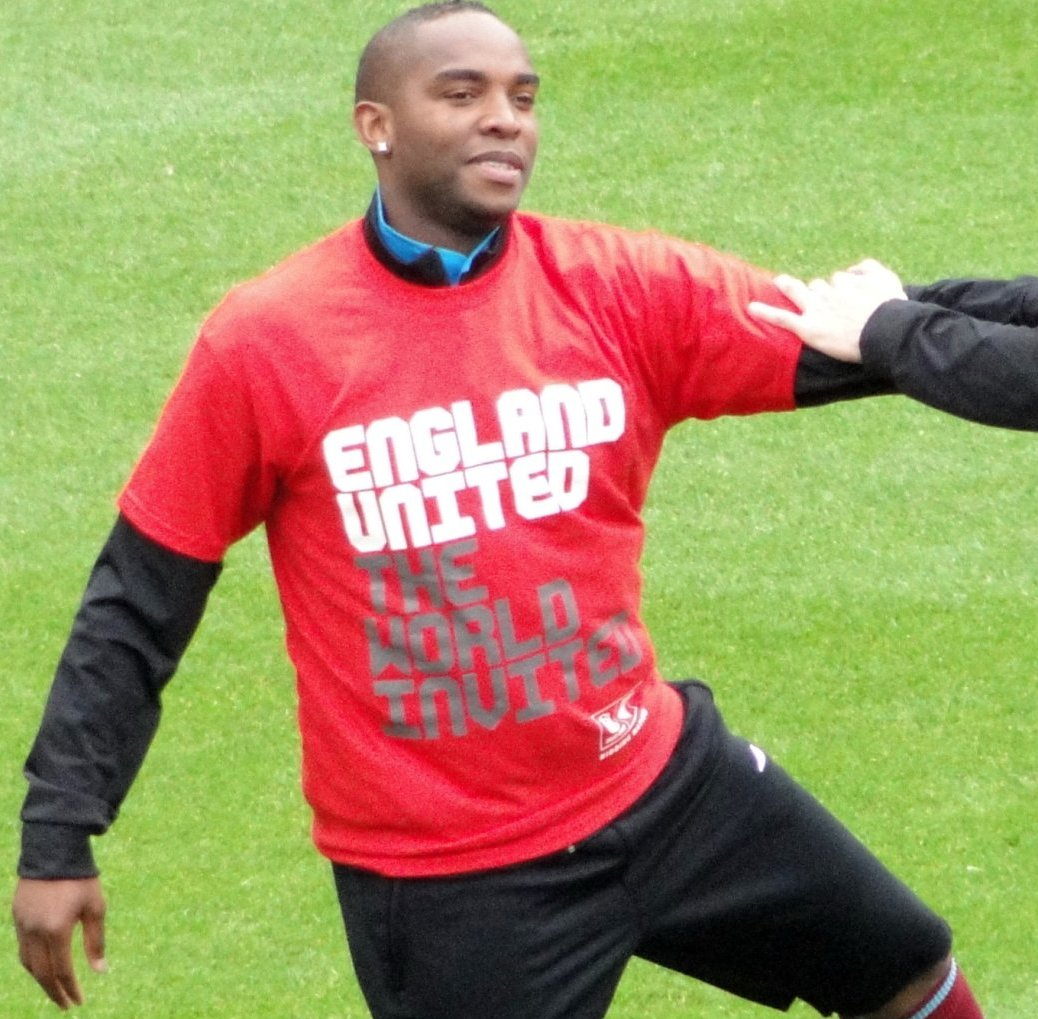
Benni McCarthy is both South Africa's joint record player and joint top scorer at FIFA World Cups. He is the only South African to score at two different tournaments.

Rank	Player	Matches	World Cups
1	Quinton Fortune	6	1998 and 2002
1	Benni McCarthy	6	1998 and 2002
1	Lucas Radebe	6	1998 and 2002
1	Aaron Mokoena	6	2002 and 2010
4	Oswin Appollis	4	2026
4	Pierre Issa	4	1998 and 2002
4	Evidence Makgopa	4	2026
4	Thalente Mbatha	4	2026
4	Mbekezeli Mbokazi	4	2026
4	Aubrey Modiba	4	2026
4	Khuliso Mudau	4	2026
4	Ime Okon	4	2026
4	Iqraam Rayners	4	2026
4	MacBeth Sibaya	4	2002 and 2010
4	Ronwen Williams	4	2026

=== Goalscorers ===
On 18 June 1998, Benni McCarthy made history by scoring South Africa's first-ever FIFA World Cup goal, doing so in their second match against Denmark in Toulouse.

Player	Goals	1998	2002	2010	2026
Shaun Bartlett	2	2			
Benni McCarthy	2	1	1		
Teboho Mokoena	1		1		
Quinton Fortune	1		1		
Siyabonga Nomvethe	1		1		
Lucas Radebe	1		1		
Tshabalala	1			1	
Bongani Khumalo	1			1	
Katlego Mphela	1			1	
Teboho Mokoena	1				1
Thapelo Maseko	1				1
Total	13	3	5	3	2

== See also ==
- African nations at the FIFA World Cup
- South Africa at the Africa Cup of Nations
- South Africa at the CONCACAF Gold Cup
- South Africa at the FIFA Confederations Cup
