= List of South Africa international soccer players =

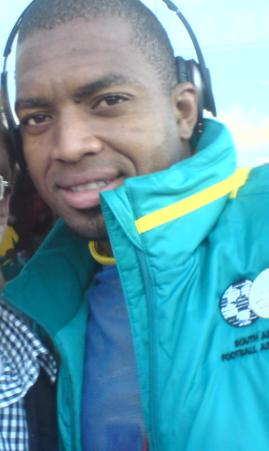
Itumeleng Khune is the second most capped South African international of all time, behind Aaron Mokoena

The South Africa national soccer team played their first international in 1906, and were founder members of the Confederation of African Football in 1956, but due to their apartheid system were banned from the confederation in 1958 and from FIFA in 1976. The South Africa national team was readmitted to both following the end of apartheid and its only major honour came in 1996 when it won the Africa Cup of Nations.

== List ==
Key
**Bold**	Played for the national team in the past year

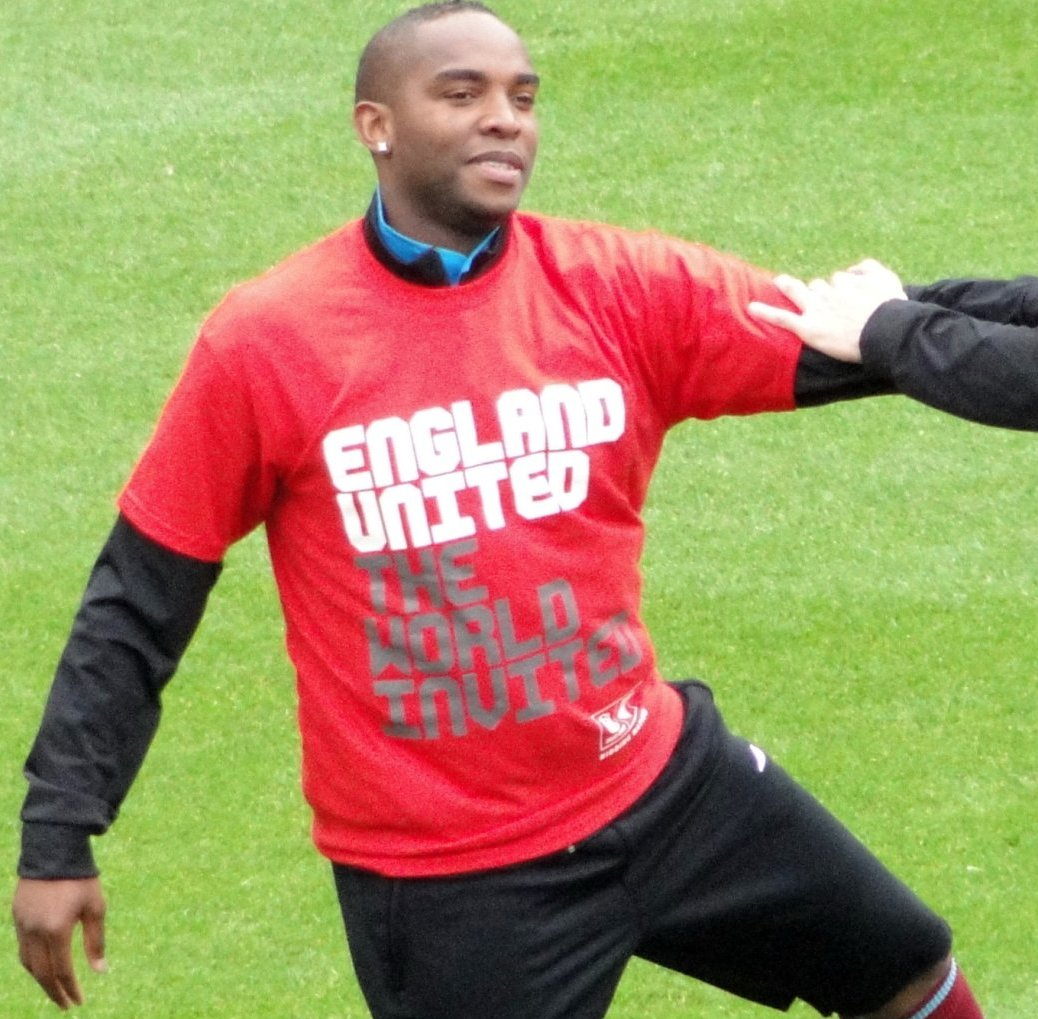
Benni McCarthy is South Africa's top goalscorer with 31 goals from 80 caps

South Africa national team soccer players with at least 20 appearances
No.	Name	National career	Caps	Goals
1	Aaron Mokoena	1999–2010	107	1
2	Itumeleng Khune	2008–2018	91	0
3	Siphiwe Tshabalala	2006–2017	89	12
4	Siyabonga Nomvethe	1999–2012	82	16
5	Benni McCarthy	1997–2012	80	31
6	Shaun Bartlett	1995–2005	74	28
7	John Moshoeu	1993–2004	73	8
8	Delron Buckley	1998–2012	72	10
8	Bernard Parker	2007–2015	72	23
10	Lucas Radebe	1992–2003	70	2
11	Andre Arendse	1995–2004	67	0
11	Sibusiso Zuma	1998–2008	67	13
13	Helman Mkhalele	1994–2001	66	7
13	Teko Modise	2007–2012	66	10
15	Mark Fish	1993–2004	62	2
15	Steven Pienaar	2002–2012	62	3
15	MacBeth Sibaya	2001–2010	62	0
18	Dean Furman	2012–2020	59	4
19	Phil Masinga	1992–2001	58	19
20	Reneilwe Letsholonyane	2008–2015	55	2
21	Kagisho Dikgacoi	2007–2013	54	2
21	Siboniso Gaxa	2005–2013	54	0
21	**Thulani Hlatshwayo**	2013–	54	3
24	Katlego Mphela	2005–2013	53	23
24	Anele Ngcongca	2009–2015	53	0
26	Neil Tovey	1992–1997	52	0
27	Tsepo Masilela	2006–2013	51	0
28	Theophilus Khumalo	1992–2001	50	9
29	**Andile Jali**	2010–	49	5
29	Sizwe Motaung	1992–1997	49	0
31	Quinton Fortune	1996–2005	47	2
31	Pierre Issa	1997–2006	47	0
33	Eric Tinkler	1994–2002	46	1
34	Mbulelo Mabizela	2001–2008	45	2
34	David Nyathi	1992–1999	45	1
36	Cyril Nzama	2000–2007	44	0
37	Thulani Serero	2011–2019	43	2
37	Hans Vonk	1998–2005	43	0
39	Bradley Carnell	1997–2010	41	0
39	Bongani Khumalo	2008–2014	41	1
39	Tokelo Rantie	2012–2017	41	12
42	Elrio Van Heerden	2004–2009	38	3
43	Thabo Mngomeni	1998–2002	37	6
43	Nasief Morris	2004–2009	37	1
45	Erick Mathoho	2011–2019	36	1
45	Benson Mhlongo	2003–2009	36	1
47	**Percy Tau**	2015–	35	13
48	Surprise Moriri	2006–2010	34	5
48	Sibusiso Vilakazi	2013–2019	34	4
50	Lerato Chabangu	2005–2014	33	2
51	Dumisa Ngobe	1996–2001	32	2
51	Bongani Zungu	2013–2020	32	6
53	Morgan Gould	2008–2017	31	1
53	Benedict Vilakazi	2002–2007	31	2
55	Brendan Augustine	1993–1998	30	4
55	Hlompho Kekana	2011–2019	30	5
57	Thabo Matlaba	2011–2016	29	1
57	John Moeti	1995–1999	29	1
57	Pollen Ndlanya	1997–2001	29	5
57	Siyabonga Sangweni	2007–2013	29	4
57	**Themba Zwane**	2014–	29	4
62	Matthew Booth	1999–2010	28	1
62	Teboho Mokoena	2001–2004	28	4
64	Linda Buthelezi	1994–1997	27	0
64	Oupa Manyisa	2011–2016	27	1
66	Lucas Thwala	2005–2010	26	1
66	**Ronwen Williams**	2014–	26	0
68	**Rivaldo Coetzee**	2014–	25	0
68	Thanduyise Khuboni	2010–2012	25	0
68	Jacob Lekgetho	2000–2004	25	0
68	Mandla Masango	2013–2016	25	4
72	Brian Baloyi	1997–2008	24	0
72	Lance Davids	2004–2010	24	0
72	Moeneeb Josephs	2003–2014	24	0
72	Steve Komphela	1992–1995	24	0
72	Katlego Mashego	2006–2014	24	2
72	Kamohelo Mokotjo	2012–2020	24	0
72	Godfrey Sapula	1999–2007	24	1
79	Rowen Fernandez	2004–2009	23	0
79	**Sifiso Hlanti**	2016–	23	0
79	Mark Williams	1992–1997	23	9
82	Thembinkosi Fanteni	2007–2011	22	2
82	Thabo Nthethe	2009–2014	22	1
82	Thuso Phala	2012–2016	22	2
85	**Keagan Dolly**	2014–	21	3
85	Buhle Mkhwanazi	2013–2019	21	0
85	Siyabonga Nkosi	2005–2009	21	2
88	Steve Crowley	1992–1995	20	0
88	Kermit Erasmus	2010–2020	20	2
88	Thabang Molefe	2001–2004	20	0
88	Jabu Pule	2000–2004	20	2
