= 2010 FIFA World Cup Group A =

Football tournament group stage

Group A of the 2010 FIFA World Cup began on 11 June and ended on 22 June 2010. The group consisted of host nation South Africa, Mexico, Uruguay and the runners-up from 2006, France.

France and South Africa previously met at the 1998 FIFA World Cup, when then-hosts France beat South Africa 3–0. They also previously met with Uruguay at the 2002 FIFA World Cup; the match ended in a 0–0 draw. France and Mexico were in the same group at the first ever World Cup in 1930; the two nations played the first-ever World Cup match and France won 4–1. France and Mexico had also met in 1954 but neither team qualified for the next round. This is also the second time that France, Mexico and Uruguay have been drawn in the same group with the host nation. They were grouped with England in 1966, when England and Uruguay advanced to the next round.

South Africa became the first World Cup host team to fail to advance past the group stage after finishing behind Mexico on goal difference. France, despite having made the final at the previous edition of the World Cup, were also eliminated after drawing one and losing two matches, including one against South Africa.

== Standings ==
Pos	Team	Pld	W	D	L	GF	GA	GD	Pts	Qualification
1	Uruguay	3	2	1	0	4	0	+4	7	Advance to knockout stage
2	Mexico	3	1	1	1	3	2	+1	4	Advance to knockout stage
3	South Africa (H)	3	1	1	1	3	5	−2	4	
4	France	3	0	1	2	1	4	−3	1	

Source: FIFA
Rules for classification: Tie-breaking criteria
(H) Hosts
- Uruguay advanced to play South Korea (runners-up of Group B) in the round of 16.
- Mexico advanced to play Argentina (winners of Group B) in the round of 16.

== Matches ==
All times local (UTC+2)

=== South Africa vs Mexico ===
South Africa vs Mexico was the opening match of the World Cup, held on 11 June 2010. It was described as an "enthralling" and "pulsating" match. Mexico put the ball in the net first, but it was offside. South Africa opened the scoring in the 55th minute after Siphiwe Tshabalala scored with a left foot shot to the top right corner of the net from the left of the penalty area after a pass through Mexico's defence by Kagiso Dikgacoi. Mexico's captain Rafael Márquez equalised following a corner kick in the 79th minute with a shot to the right of the net from five yards out on the right. In the final minutes of the match, Katlego Mphela almost scored a winning goal for South Africa, but his shot bounced off the post.

Tshabalala was named as the man of the match. South Africa's coach, Carlos Alberto Parreira called the result "fair", while Mexico's coach Javier Aguirre stated "we could have won, we could have lost".

This opening match was played again as the opener for the 2026 FIFA World Cup on 11 June 2026, exactly 16 years later, with Mexico now hosting South Africa.

11 June 2010
16:00

South Africa	1–1	Mexico
Tshabalala 55'		Márquez 79'

Soccer City, Johannesburg
Attendance: 84,490
Referee: Ravshan Irmatov (Uzbekistan)

South Africa	Mexico

GK	16	Itumeleng Khune
RB	2	Siboniso Gaxa
CB	4	Aaron Mokoena (c)
CB	20	Bongani Khumalo
LB	15	Lucas Thwala		(substituted off) 46'
RM	8	Siphiwe Tshabalala
CM	13	Kagisho Dikgacoi	(yellow card) 27'
CM	12	Reneilwe Letsholonyane
LM	11	Teko Modise
SS	10	Steven Pienaar		(substituted off) 83'
CF	9	Katlego Mphela
Substitutions:
DF	3	Tsepo Masilela	(yellow card) 70'	(substituted on) 46'
FW	17	Bernard Parker		(substituted on) 83'
Manager:
(Brazil) Carlos Alberto Parreira

GK	1	Óscar Pérez
RB	12	Paul Aguilar		(substituted off) 55'
CB	5	Ricardo Osorio
CB	2	Francisco Javier Rodríguez
LB	3	Carlos Salcido
DM	4	Rafael Márquez
CM	16	Efraín Juárez	(yellow card) 18'
CM	6	Gerardo Torrado (c)	(yellow card) 57'
RW	17	Giovani dos Santos
LW	11	Carlos Vela		(substituted off) 69'
CF	9	Guillermo Franco		(substituted off) 73'
Substitutions:
MF	18	Andrés Guardado		(substituted on) 55'
FW	10	Cuauhtémoc Blanco		(substituted on) 69'
FW	14	Javier Hernández		(substituted on) 73'
Manager:
Javier Aguirre

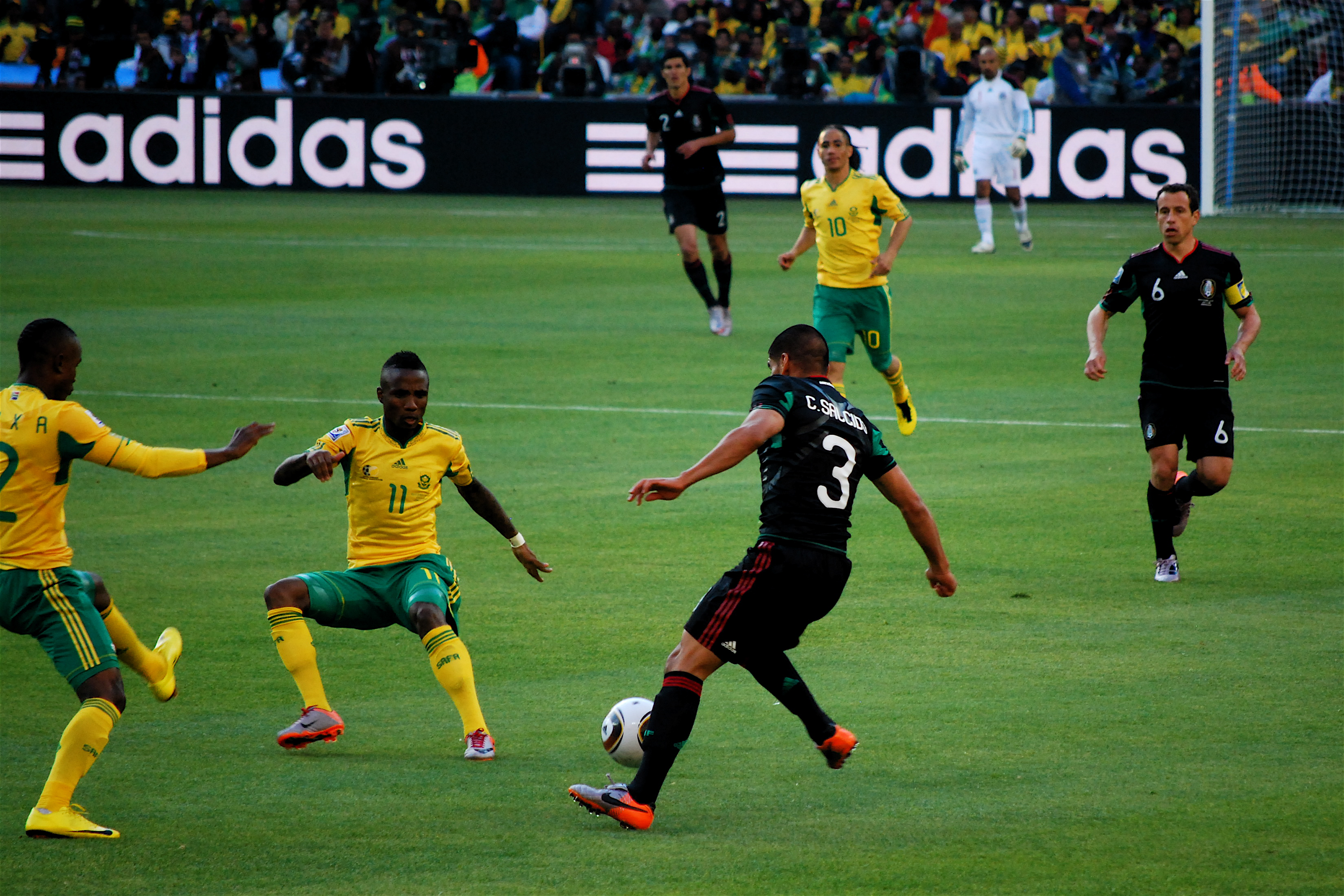
South Africa vs Mexico

Man of the Match:
Siphiwe Tshabalala (South Africa)

Assistant referees:
Rafael Ilyasov (Uzbekistan)
Bakhadyr Kochkarov (Kyrgyzstan)
Fourth official:
Subkhiddin Mohd Salleh (Malaysia)
Fifth official:
Mu Yuxin (China)

=== Uruguay vs France ===
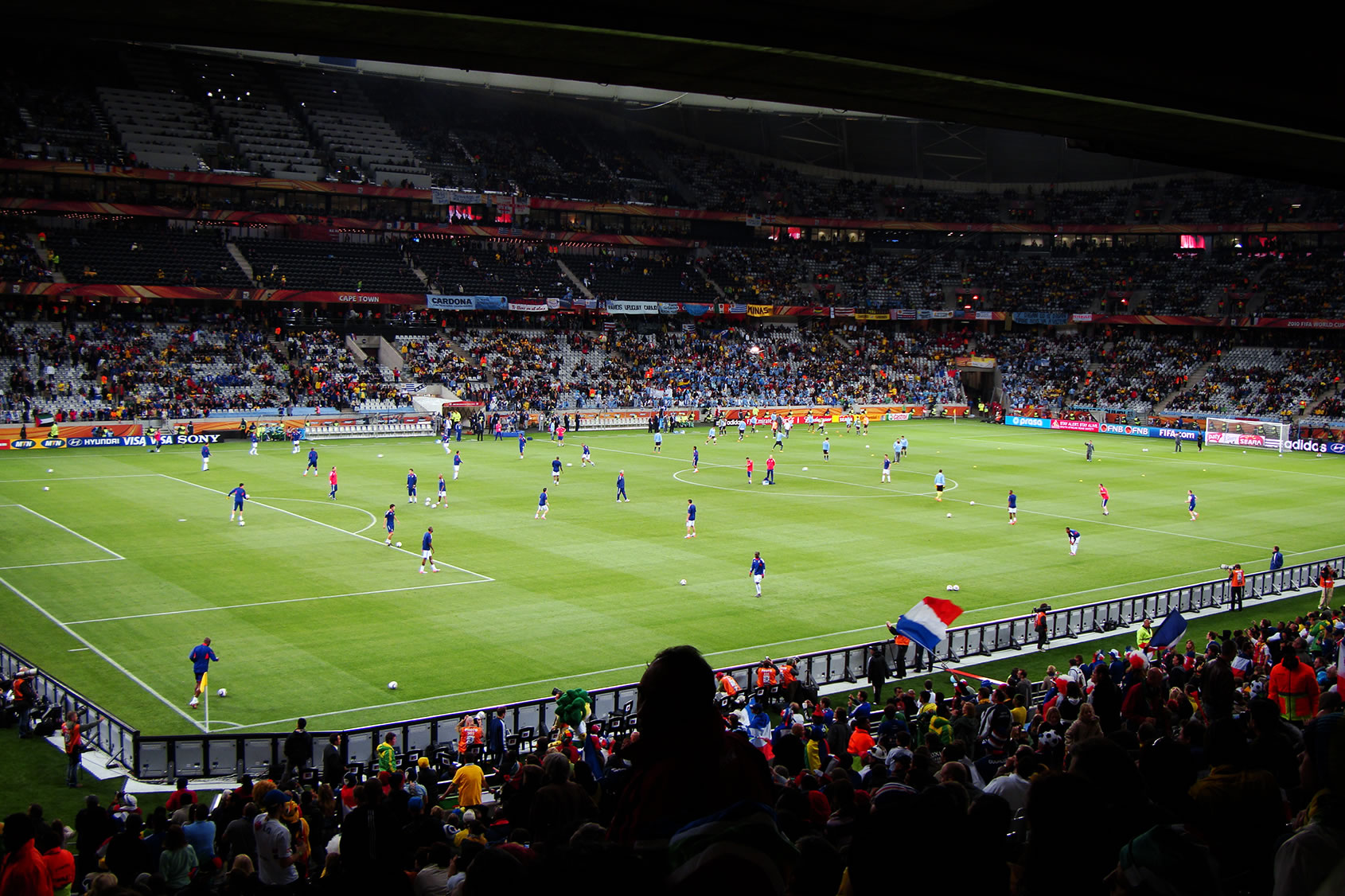
The Uruguayan and French teams warming up

France and Uruguay faced each other on 11 June 2010 at the Cape Town Stadium. Despite a red card being given to Uruguay substitute Nicolás Lodeiro in the second half, Uruguay were able to hold a "lacklustre" France to a 0–0 draw. After the match, former World Cup-winning French player Zinedine Zidane criticised the French team and particularly coach Raymond Domenech for a lack of teamwork. Domenech claimed after the match to be "happy with the overall performance".

11 June 2010
20:30

Uruguay	0–0	France

Cape Town Stadium, Cape Town
Attendance: 64,100
Referee: Yuichi Nishimura (Japan)

Uruguay	France

GK	1	Fernando Muslera
RB	6	Mauricio Victorino	(yellow card) 59'
CB	2	Diego Lugano (c)	(yellow card) 90+3'
CB	3	Diego Godín
LB	11	Álvaro Pereira
RM	16	Maxi Pereira
CM	15	Diego Pérez		(substituted off) 87'
CM	17	Egidio Arévalo
LM	18	Ignacio González		(substituted off) 63'
CF	10	Diego Forlán
CF	9	Luis Suárez		(substituted off) 74'
Substitutions:
MF	14	Nicolás Lodeiro	(yellow card) 65' (yellow-red card) 81'	(substituted on) 63'
FW	13	Sebastián Abreu		(substituted on) 74'
MF	8	Sebastián Eguren		(substituted on) 87'
Manager:
Óscar Tabárez

GK	1	Hugo Lloris
RB	2	Bacary Sagna
CB	5	William Gallas
CB	3	Eric Abidal
LB	13	Patrice Evra (c)	(yellow card) 12'
DM	14	Jérémy Toulalan	(yellow card) 68'
CM	8	Yoann Gourcuff		(substituted off) 75'
CM	19	Abou Diaby
RW	10	Sidney Govou		(substituted off) 85'
LW	7	Franck Ribéry	(yellow card) 19'
CF	21	Nicolas Anelka		(substituted off) 72'
Substitutions:
FW	12	Thierry Henry		(substituted on) 72'
MF	15	Florent Malouda		(substituted on) 75'
FW	11	André-Pierre Gignac		(substituted on) 85'
Manager:
Raymond Domenech

Man of the Match:
Diego Forlán (Uruguay)

Assistant referees:
Toru Sagara (Japan)
Jeong Hae-sang (South Korea)
Fourth official:
Joel Aguilar (El Salvador)
Fifth official:
William Torres (El Salvador)

=== South Africa vs Uruguay ===
Uruguay took the lead in the 24th minute, when Diego Forlán launched a shot from 30 yards out that beat goalkeeper Itumeleng Khune, who did not attempt to save the shot. In the second half, Luis Suárez was left through on goal, but he was brought down by Khune. Referee Massimo Busacca awarded a penalty and showed Khune a red card. Deep into injury time, Uruguay scored their third goal when Álvaro Pereira tapped in a Suárez cross. This was Uruguay's first World Cup win since 1990.

16 June 2010
20:30

South Africa	0–3	Uruguay
		Forlán 24', 80' (pen.); Á. Pereira 90+5'

Loftus Versfeld Stadium, Pretoria
Attendance: 42,658
Referee: Massimo Busacca (Switzerland)

South Africa	Uruguay

GK	16	Itumeleng Khune	(red card) 76'
RB	2	Siboniso Gaxa
CB	4	Aaron Mokoena (c)
CB	20	Bongani Khumalo
LB	3	Tsepo Masilela
RM	8	Siphiwe Tshabalala
CM	13	Kagisho Dikgacoi	(yellow card) 42'
CM	12	Reneilwe Letsholonyane		(substituted off) 57'
LM	11	Teko Modise
SS	10	Steven Pienaar	(yellow card) 6'	(substituted off) 79'
CF	9	Katlego Mphela
Substitutions:
MF	19	Surprise Moriri		(substituted on) 57'
GK	1	Moeneeb Josephs		(substituted on) 79'
Manager:
(Brazil) Carlos Alberto Parreira

GK	1	Fernando Muslera
RB	16	Maxi Pereira
CB	2	Diego Lugano (c)
CB	3	Diego Godín
LB	4	Jorge Fucile	(substituted off) 71'
DM	15	Diego Pérez	(substituted off) 90'
RM	17	Egidio Arévalo
LM	11	Álvaro Pereira
AM	10	Diego Forlán
CF	9	Luis Suárez
CF	7	Edinson Cavani	(substituted off) 89'
Substitutions:
MF	20	Álvaro Fernández	(substituted on) 71'
FW	21	Sebastián Fernández	(substituted on) 89'
MF	5	Walter Gargano	(substituted on) 90'
Manager:
Óscar Tabárez

Man of the Match:
Diego Forlán (Uruguay)

Assistant referees:
Matthias Arnet (Switzerland)
Francesco Buragina (Switzerland)
Fourth official:
Wolfgang Stark (Germany)
Fifth official:
Jan-Hendrik Salver (Germany)

=== France vs Mexico ===
Mexico's 2–0 victory over France in Polokwane was the nation's first win against a World Cup-winning team. It was overshadowed by French striker Nicolas Anelka launching a tirade of abuse towards coach Raymond Domenech during the half-time interval. Anelka was subsequently dismissed from the squad, which resulted in many squad members, including captain Patrice Evra, boycotting training in the lead-up to the final group stage match against South Africa.

17 June 2010
20:30

France	0–2	Mexico
		Hernández 64'; Blanco 79' (pen.)

Peter Mokaba Stadium, Polokwane
Attendance: 35,370
Referee: Khalil Al Ghamdi (Saudi Arabia)

France	Mexico

GK	1	Hugo Lloris
RB	2	Bacary Sagna
CB	5	William Gallas
CB	3	Eric Abidal	(yellow card) 78'
LB	13	Patrice Evra (c)
CM	14	Jérémy Toulalan	(yellow card) 45+1'
CM	19	Abou Diaby
RW	10	Sidney Govou		(substituted off) 69'
AM	7	Franck Ribéry
LW	15	Florent Malouda
CF	21	Nicolas Anelka		(substituted off) 46'
Substitutions:
FW	11	André-Pierre Gignac		(substituted on) 46'
MF	20	Mathieu Valbuena		(substituted on) 69'
Manager:
Raymond Domenech

GK	1	Óscar Pérez
RB	5	Ricardo Osorio
CB	15	Héctor Moreno	(yellow card) 49'
CB	2	Francisco Javier Rodríguez	(yellow card) 82'
LB	3	Carlos Salcido
DM	4	Rafael Márquez (c)
CM	16	Efraín Juárez	(yellow card) 48'	(substituted off) 55'
CM	6	Gerardo Torrado
RW	17	Giovani dos Santos
LW	11	Carlos Vela		(substituted off) 31'
CF	9	Guillermo Franco	(yellow card) 4'	(substituted off) 62'
Substitutions:
MF	7	Pablo Barrera		(substituted on) 31'
FW	14	Javier Hernández		(substituted on) 55'
FW	10	Cuauhtémoc Blanco		(substituted on) 62'
Manager:
Javier Aguirre

Man of the Match:
Javier Hernández (Mexico)

Assistant referees:
Hassan Kamranifar (Iran)
Saleh Al Marzouqi (United Arab Emirates)
Fourth official:
Peter O'Leary (New Zealand)
Fifth official:
Matthew Taro (Solomon Islands)

=== Mexico vs Uruguay ===
22 June 2010
16:00

Mexico	0–1	Uruguay
		Suárez 43'

Royal Bafokeng Stadium, Rustenburg
Attendance: 33,425
Referee: Viktor Kassai (Hungary)

Mexico	Uruguay

GK	1	Óscar Pérez
RB	5	Ricardo Osorio
CB	2	Francisco Javier Rodríguez
CB	15	Héctor Moreno		(substituted off) 57'
LB	3	Carlos Salcido
RM	6	Gerardo Torrado
CM	4	Rafael Márquez
LM	18	Andrés Guardado		(substituted off) 46'
AM	17	Giovani dos Santos
AM	10	Cuauhtémoc Blanco (c)		(substituted off) 63'
CF	9	Guillermo Franco
Substitutions:
MF	7	Pablo Barrera		(substituted on) 46'
MF	8	Israel Castro	(yellow card) 86'	(substituted on) 57'
FW	14	Javier Hernández	(yellow card) 77'	(substituted on) 63'
Manager:
Javier Aguirre

GK	1	Fernando Muslera
RB	16	Maxi Pereira
CB	2	Diego Lugano (c)
CB	6	Mauricio Victorino
LB	4	Jorge Fucile	(yellow card) 68'
DM	15	Diego Pérez
RM	17	Egidio Arévalo
LM	11	Álvaro Pereira		(substituted off) 77'
AM	10	Diego Forlán
CF	9	Luis Suárez		(substituted off) 85'
CF	7	Edinson Cavani
Substitutions:
DF	19	Andrés Scotti		(substituted on) 77'
MF	20	Álvaro Fernández		(substituted on) 85'
Manager:
Óscar Tabárez

Man of the Match:
Luis Suárez (Uruguay)

Assistant referees:
Gábor Erős (Hungary)
Tibor Vámos (Hungary)
Fourth official:
Martin Hansson (Sweden)
Fifth official:
Stefan Wittberg (Sweden)

=== France vs South Africa ===
22 June 2010
16:00

France	1–2	South Africa
Malouda 70'		Khumalo 20'; Mphela 37'

Free State Stadium, Bloemfontein
Attendance: 39,415
Referee: Óscar Ruiz (Colombia)

France	South Africa

GK	1	Hugo Lloris
RB	2	Bacary Sagna
CB	5	William Gallas
CB	17	Sébastien Squillaci
LB	22	Gaël Clichy
CM	18	Alou Diarra (c)		(substituted off) 82'
CM	19	Abou Diaby	(yellow card) 71'
RW	11	André-Pierre Gignac		(substituted off) 46'
AM	8	Yoann Gourcuff	(red card) 25'
LW	7	Franck Ribéry
CF	9	Djibril Cissé		(substituted off) 55'
Substitutions:
MF	15	Florent Malouda		(substituted on) 46'
FW	12	Thierry Henry		(substituted on) 55'
FW	10	Sidney Govou		(substituted on) 82'
Manager:
Raymond Domenech

GK	1	Moeneeb Josephs
RB	5	Anele Ngcongca†	(substituted off) 55'
CB	4	Aaron Mokoena (c)
CB	20	Bongani Khumalo
LB	3	Tsepo Masilela
CM	6	MacBeth Sibaya
CM	23	Thanduyise Khuboni	(substituted off) 78'
RW	10	Steven Pienaar
LW	8	Siphiwe Tshabalala
CF	9	Katlego Mphela
CF	17	Bernard Parker	(substituted off) 68'
Substitutions:
DF	2	Siboniso Gaxa	(substituted on) 55'
FW	18	Siyabonga Nomvethe	(substituted on) 68'
MF	11	Teko Modise	(substituted on) 78'
Manager:
(Brazil) Carlos Alberto Parreira

Man of the Match:
Katlego Mphela (South Africa)

Assistant referees:
Abraham González (Colombia)
Humberto Clavijo (Colombia)
Fourth official:
Héctor Baldassi (Argentina)
Fifth official:
Ricardo Casas (Argentina)

== See also ==
- France at the FIFA World Cup
- Mexico at the FIFA World Cup
- South Africa at the FIFA World Cup
- Uruguay at the FIFA World Cup
