= Nzama =

Nzama is a South African surname. Notable people with the surname include:

- Cyril Nzama (born 1974), South African soccer player
- Nkosazana Daughter (Nkosazana Nolwazi Kimberly Nzama; born 2000), South African singer and somgwriter
