= Carlos Alberto Parreira =

Brazilian football manager (born 1943)

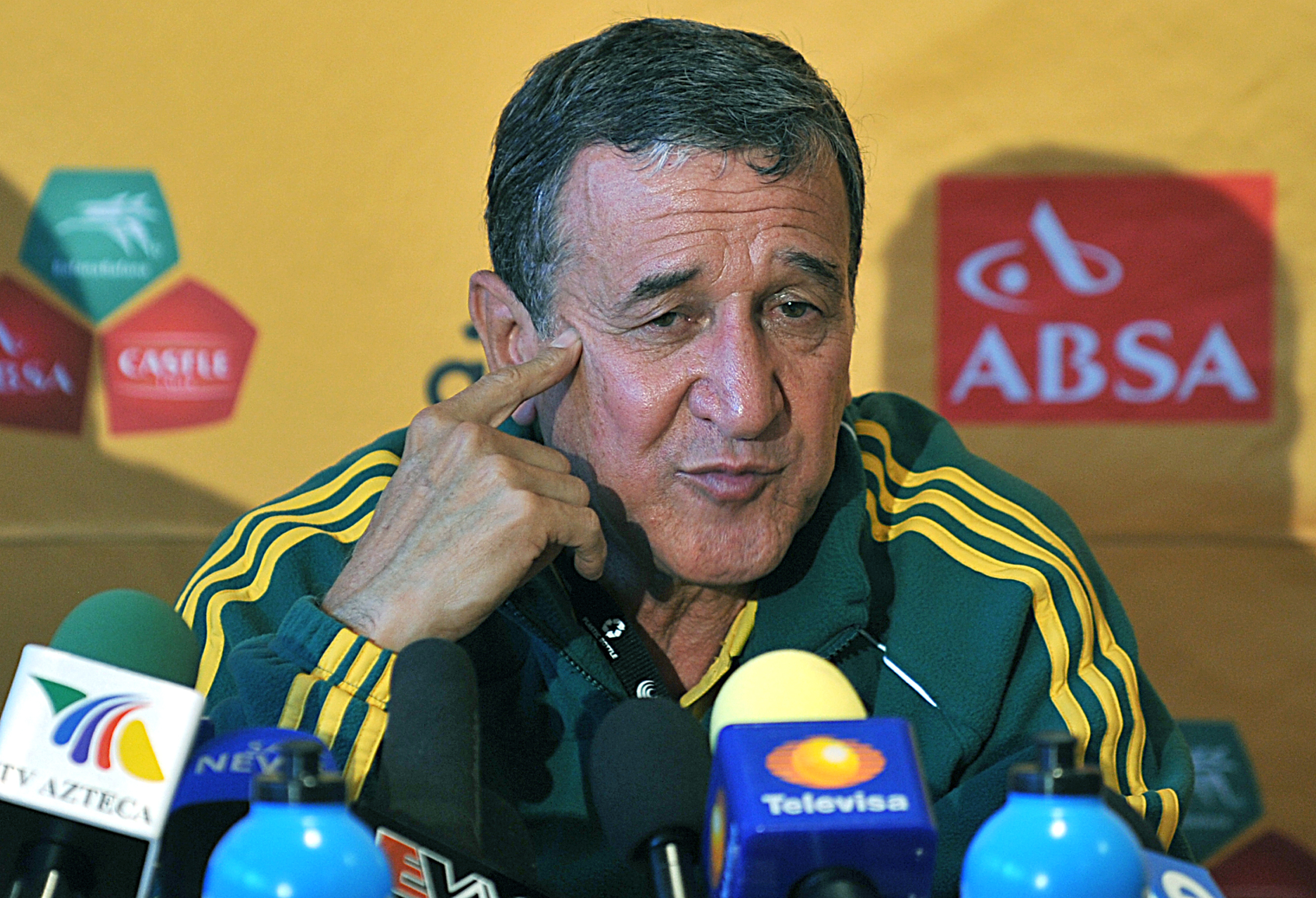
- Parreira as manager of South Africa in 2010

Personal information
- Full name: Carlos Alberto Gomes Parreira
- Date of birth: 27 February 1943 (age 83)
- Place of birth: Rio de Janeiro, Brazil

Managerial career
- Years: Team
- 1967–1968: Ghana
- 1974: Fluminense
- 1975: Fluminense
- 1978–1982: Kuwait
- 1983: Brazil
- 1984: Fluminense
- 1985–1988: United Arab Emirates
- 1988–1990: Saudi Arabia
- 1990–1991: United Arab Emirates
- 1991: Bragantino
- 1991–1994: Brazil
- 1994–1995: Valencia
- 1995–1996: Fenerbahçe
- 1996: São Paulo
- 1997: MetroStars
- 1998: Saudi Arabia
- 1999–2000: Fluminense
- 2000: Atlético Mineiro
- 2000: Santos
- 2001: Internacional
- 2002: Corinthians
- 2003–2006: Brazil
- 2007–2008: South Africa
- 2009: Fluminense
- 2009–2010: South Africa
Medal record
Men's football
Representing Brazil (as manager)
FIFA World Cup
Winner	1994 USA
Copa América
Winner	2004 Peru
FIFA Confederations Cup
Winner	2005 Germany
Lunar New Year Cup
Winner	2005 Hong Kong
Representing Kuwait (as manager)
AFC Asian Cup
Winner	1980 Kuwait
Arabian Gulf Cup
Winner	1982 UAE
Representing Saudi Arabia (as manager)
AFC Asian Cup
Winner	1988 Qatar
Representing South Africa (as manager)
COSAFA Cup
Winner	2007 South Africa

Carlos Alberto Gomes Parreira (born 27 February 1943) is a Brazilian former football manager who holds the record for attending the most FIFA World Cup tournaments as manager with six appearances. He also managed five different national teams in six editions of the FIFA World Cup. He managed Brazil to victory at the 1994 World Cup, the 2004 Copa América, and the 2005 Confederations Cup. He is also the only manager to have led two different Asian teams to conquer the AFC Asian Cup.

He last managed the South Africa national football team.

Parreira is one of the most successful managers to have never played football himself.

== Coaching career ==
Parreira supports Fluminense, and he has won two league titles for the club: The First Division Brazilian Championship in 1984 and the Third Division in 1999. About the latter title, Parreira has said that this was personally the most important trophy of his career, even more so than Brazil's World Cup triumph, as the club he loved was facing near-bankruptcy and became very close to extinction at the time.

Parreira is one of two coaches that has led five national teams to the World Cup: Kuwait in 1982, United Arab Emirates in 1990, Brazil in 1994 and 2006, Saudi Arabia in 1998 and South Africa in 2010. The other coach, Bora Milutinović, reached this record when he led a fifth team in 2002. Parreira was also involved with the 1970 championship team for Brazil, which he claims was an inspiration for him to aspire to be a national football coach.

In 1997, Parreira coached the MetroStars of the American Major League Soccer. He also coached Fenerbahçe in Turkey and won a Turkish League Championship. Parreira was in charge of Corinthians in 2002, which gave him two of the most important national trophies of 2002: The Brazilian Cup and the Torneio Rio-São Paulo, besides being runner up at the Brazilian League.

When coaching Saudi Arabia at the 1998 World Cup in France, he was fired after two matches, one of three managers to be sacked during the tournament.

Parreira repeatedly turned down offers to coach Brazil again between 1998 and 2002 World Cups. In end of 2000, when the team was in turmoil after firing Vanderlei Luxemburgo, he refused the post, stating that he did not want to relive the stress and pressure of winning the World Cup again. There were public cries again to replace Luiz Felipe Scolari for Parreira in July 2001 when Brazil lost two matches to Mexico and Honduras in its title defense at the 2001 Copa América in Colombia, especially after last minute invitee (replacing Argentina who dropped out one day before the kickoff) Honduras defeated 2–0 and eliminated the favorite Brazil in quarter finals round on July 23, 2001. Parreira only stated that he would indirectly assist Scolari in the 2002 campaign. After the 2002 World Cup, Parreira took part in drafting a technical report of the tournament. He was named coach along with Mario Zagallo as assistant director in January 2003, with the goal of defending their World Cup title in Germany 2006, but on July 1, 2006, Brazil was defeated and eliminated 0–1 by France in the quarterfinals.

After Brazil's exit from the World Cup, Parreira was heavily criticized by the Brazilian public and media for playing an outdated brand of football and not using the players available to him properly. Parreira subsequently resigned on July 19, 2006. He coached Brazil to victory in the 1994 FIFA World Cup and was the coach of the South Africa national football team until resigning in April 2008. On October 22, 2009, it was announced he would return as head coach of South Africa. He announced a verbal agreement with the South African Football Association on October 23, 2009.

He resumed coaching South Africa in 2009 in time for the 2010 World Cup. In South Africa, his team drew with Mexico, 1–1, in the tournament opener, lost to Uruguay, 3–0, and beat France, 2–1, to finish third in Group A. After the France game, he tried to shake hands with French coach Raymond Domenech but the latter refused.

On 25 June 2010 he announced his retirement as football coach.

== Style of management ==
In contrast to other previous more offensive-minded managers of the Brazil national team, who were inspired by Brazil's tradition of "jogo bonito" and "futebol arte," but who had not won the World Cup since 1970, Parreira was instead known for his more pragmatic and physical attitude as a coach, with a focus on defensive stability. During the team's victorious 1994 World Cup campaign, he used a 4–4–2 formation, with a strong back-line, and two defensive midfielders – Mauro Silva and Dunga – who won back the ball and distributed it to other players, helping his team control possession. He also fielded Mazinho – normally a full-back – as a winger. While Parreira was praised by pundits for his success with the Brazil national team, his tactical intelligence, and his hard-working approach as a manager, the atypically less spectacular gameplay of the Brazil national side under his tenure was also criticised in the press. Due to Dunga's key role as captain and the starting holding midfielder in the team, this period came to be known derisively as the "Dunga Era" in the media.

== Managerial statistics ==
As of 26 September 2023

Team	Nat	From	To	Record								
Team	Nat	From	To	G	W	D	L	GF	GA	GD	Win %	Ref
Ghana	(Ghana)	1967	1968	19	10	7	2	42	29	+13	52.63	
Fluminense	(Brazil)	1974	1975	109	51	27	31	160	93	+67	46.79	
Kuwait	(Kuwait)	1978	1982	62	34	9	19	108	68	+40	54.84	
Brazil	(Brazil)	1983	1983	14	5	7	2	21	12	+9	35.71	
Fluminense	(Brazil)	1984	1984	72	45	19	8	114	45	+69	62.50	
UAE	(United Arab Emirates)	1985	1988	17	8	4	5	21	16	+5	47.06	
Saudi Arabia	(Saudi Arabia)	1988	1990	26	10	9	7	18	22	−4	38.46	
UAE	(United Arab Emirates)	1990	1991	15	1	5	9	10	33	−23	6.67	
Red Bull Bragantino	(Brazil)	1991	1991	49	20	19	10	58	38	+20	40.82	
Brazil	(Brazil)	1991	1994	46	27	14	5	95	33	+62	58.70	
Valencia	(Spain)	1994	1995	43	17	12	14	66	47	+19	39.53	
Fenerbahçe	(Turkey)	1995	1996	45	30	10	5	84	31	+53	66.67	
São Paulo	(Brazil)	18 August 1996	26 October 1996	17	4	6	7	20	22	−2	23.53	
MetroStars	(United States)	1 January 1997	31 December 1997	35	15	0	20	56	64	−8	42.86	
Saudi Arabia	(Saudi Arabia)	22 February 1998	18 June 1998	10	2	4	4	5	17	−12	20.00	
Fluminense	(Brazil)	20 December 1998	14 February 2000	57	30	9	18	92	75	+17	52.63	
Corinthians	(Brazil)	20 December 2001	28 December 2002	66	34	17	15	117	85	+32	51.52	
Brazil	(Brazil)	8 January 2003	20 July 2006	53	31	15	7	122	45	+77	58.49	
South Africa	(South Africa)	26 January 2007	21 April 2008	17	7	4	6	23	16	+7	41.18	
Fluminense	(Brazil)	7 March 2009	13 July 2009	10	2	4	4	8	13	−5	20.00	
South Africa	(South Africa)	23 October 2009	23 June 2010	15	7	7	1	23	9	+14	46.67	
Total				797	390	208	199	1,263	813	+450	48.93	—

== Career statistics ==
=== Fitness coach ===
- São Cristóvão (1967)
- Vasco da Gama (1969)
- Brazil (1970)
- Fluminense (1970–1974)

=== Assistant coach ===
- Brazil (Olympic Team) (1972)
- Kuwait (1976–1977)

=== FIFA World Cup matches ===
Parreira has coached national squads in 23 games in FIFA World Cup finals. Parreira's coaching record is 10–4–9 (Wins-Draws-Losses). His teams have scored 28 goals and conceded 32. Below is a list of all matches, along with their outcomes:

==== 1982 FIFA World Cup ====
17 June 1982 Group stage	Czechoslovakia	1–1	Kuwait	Valladolid
17:15 CEST	Panenka 21' (pen.)	Report	Al-Dakhil 57'	Stadium: Estadio José Zorrilla; Attendance: 25,000; Referee: Benjamin Dwomoh (Ghana)

21 June 1982 Group stage	France	4–1	Kuwait	Valladolid
17:15 CEST	Genghini 31'; Platini 43'; Didier Six 48'; Bossis 89'	Report	Al-Buloushi 75'	Stadium: Estadio José Zorrilla; Attendance: 30,043; Referee: Myroslav Stupar (Soviet Union)

25 June 1982 Group stage	England	1–0	Kuwait	Bilbao
17:15 CEST	Francis 27'	Report		Stadium: San Mamés; Attendance: 39,700; Referee: Gilberto Aristizábal (Colombia)

==== 1990 FIFA World Cup ====
9 May 1990 Group stage	United Arab Emirates	0–2	Colombia	Bologna
19:00 CEST		Report	Redín 50'; Valderrama 85'	Stadium: Stadio Renato Dall'Ara; Attendance: 30,791; Referee: George Courtney (England)

15 May 1990 Group stage	West Germany	5–1	United Arab Emirates	Milan
21:00 CEST	Völler 35', 75'; Klinsmann 37'; Matthäus 47'; Bein 58'	Report	Ismaïl 46'	Stadium: San Siro; Attendance: 71,169; Referee: Alexey Spirin (Soviet Union)

19 May 1990 Group stage	Yugoslavia	4–1	United Arab Emirates	Bologna
17:00 CEST	Sušić 5'; Pančev 9', 46'; Prosinečki 90+3'	Report	Jumaa 22'	Stadium: Stadio Renato Dall'Ara; Attendance: 27,833; Referee: Shizuo Takada (Japan)

==== 1994 FIFA World Cup ====
20 June 1994 Group stage	Brazil	2–0	Russia	Stanford
13:00 PDT	Romário 26'; Raí 52' (pen.)	Report		Stadium: Stanford Stadium; Attendance: 81,061; Referee: Lim Kee Chong (Mauritius)

24 June 1994 Group stage	Brazil	3–0	Cameroon	Stanford
13:00 PDT	Romário 39'; Márcio Santos 66'; Bebeto 73'	Report		Stadium: Stanford Stadium; Attendance: 83,401; Referee: Arturo Brizio Carter (Mexico)

28 June 1994 Group stage	Brazil	1–1	Sweden	Pontiac
16:00 EDT	Romário 46'	Report	K. Andersson 23'	Stadium: Pontiac Silverdome; Attendance: 77,217; Referee: Sándor Puhl (Hungary)

4 July 1994 Round of 16	Brazil	1–0	United States	Stanford
12:30 PDT	Bebeto 72'	Report		Stadium: Stanford Stadium; Attendance: 81,147; Referee: Joël Quiniou (France)

9 July 1994 Quarter-finals	Netherlands	2–3	Brazil	Dallas
14:30 CDT	Bergkamp 64'; Winter 76'	Report	Romário 53'; Bebeto 63'; Branco 81'	Stadium: Cotton Bowl; Attendance: 63,500; Referee: Rodrigo Badilla (Costa Rica)

13 July 1994 Semi-finals	Sweden	0–1	Brazil	Pasadena
16:30 PDT		Report	Romário 80'	Stadium: Rose Bowl; Attendance: 91,856; Referee: José Torres Cadena (Colombia)

17 July 1994 Final	Brazil	0–0 (a.e.t.) (3–2 p)	Italy	Pasadena
12:30 PDT		Report		Stadium: Rose Bowl; Attendance: 94,194; Referee: Sándor Puhl (Hungary)
	Penalties
	Márcio Santos (penalty missed); Romário (penalty scored); Branco (penalty scored); Dunga (penalty scored)		(penalty missed) Baresi; (penalty scored) Albertini; (penalty scored) Evani; (penalty missed) Massaro; (penalty missed) R. Baggio

==== 1998 FIFA World Cup ====
12 June 1998 Group stage	Saudi Arabia	0–1	Denmark	Lens
17:30		Report	Rieper 69'	Stadium: Stade Félix Bollaert; Attendance: 38,100; Referee: Javier Castrilli (Argentina)

18 June 1998 Group stage	France	4–0	Saudi Arabia	Saint-Denis
21:00	Henry 37', 78'; Trezeguet 68'; Lizarazu 85'	Report		Stadium: Stade de France; Attendance: 80,000; Referee: Arturo Brizio Carter (Mexico)

==== 2006 FIFA World Cup ====
13 June 2006 Group stage	Brazil	1–0	Croatia	Berlin
21:00	Kaká 44'	Report		Stadium: Olympiastadion; Attendance: 72,000; Referee: Benito Archundia (Mexico)

18 June 2006 Group stage	Brazil	2–0	Australia	Munich
18:00	Adriano 49'; Fred 90'	Report		Stadium: FIFA WM-Stadion München; Attendance: 66,000; Referee: Markus Merk (Germany)

22 June 2006 Group stage	Japan	1–4	Brazil	Dortmund
21:00	Tamada 34'	Report	Ronaldo 45+1', 81'; Juninho 53'; Gilberto 59'	Stadium: FIFA WM-Stadion Dortmund; Attendance: 65,000; Referee: Éric Poulat (France)

27 June 2006 Round of 16	Brazil	3–0	Ghana	Dortmund
17:00	Ronaldo 5'; Adriano 45+1'; Zé Roberto 84'	Report		Stadium: FIFA WM-Stadion Dortmund; Attendance: 65,000; Referee: Ľuboš Micheľ (Slovakia)

1 July 2006 Quarter-finals	Brazil	0–1	France	Frankfurt
21:00		Report	Henry 57'	Stadium: FIFA WM-Stadion Frankfurt; Attendance: 48,000; Referee: Luis Medina Cantalejo (Spain)

==== 2010 FIFA World Cup ====
11 June 2010 Group stage	South Africa	1–1	Mexico	Johannesburg
16:00	Tshabalala 55'	Report	Márquez 79'	Stadium: Soccer City; Attendance: 84,490; Referee: Ravshan Irmatov (Uzbekistan)

16 June 2010 Group stage	South Africa	0–3	Uruguay	Pretoria
20:30		Report	Forlán 24' 80' (pen.); Á. Pereira 90+5'	Stadium: Loftus Versfeld Stadium; Attendance: 42,658; Referee: Massimo Busacca (Switzerland)

22 June 2010 Group stage	France	1–2	South Africa	Bloemfontein
16:00	Malouda 70'	Report	Khumalo 20'; Mphela 37'	Stadium: Free State Stadium; Attendance: 39,415; Referee: Óscar Ruiz (Colombia)

== Honours ==
=== Manager ===
==== Club ====
Fluminense

- Série A: 1984
- Série C: 1999

Fenerbahçe

- Süper Lig: 1995–96

Corinthians

- Torneio Rio – São Paulo: 2002
- Copa do Brasil: 2002

==== International ====
Kuwait

- Arabian Gulf Cup: 1982
- AFC Asian Cup: 1980

Brazil

- Amistad Cup: 1992
- FIFA World Cup: 1994
- Copa América: 2004
- FIFA Confederations Cup: 2005
- Lunar New Year Cup: 2005

Saudi Arabia

- AFC Asian Cup: 1988

South Africa

- COSAFA Cup: 2007

==== Individual ====
- World Soccer Magazine World Manager of the Year: 1994
- IFFHS World's Best National Coach: 2005

== See also ==
- National team managers with 100 or more matches
- List of Brazil national football team managers
