= SAFA Awards =

The South African Football Association (SAFA) Awards are awards given to football players and coaches of South African origin by the South African Football Association. The awards were formed in 2008.

== Player of the year ==
Year	Player	Club
2009	Steven Pienaar	(England) Everton
2010	Siphiwe Tshabalala	(South Africa) Kaizer Chiefs

== Young Player of the Year ==
Year	Player	Club
2009	Thulani Serero	(South Africa) Ajax Cape Town
2010	Andile Jali	(South Africa) Orlando Pirates

== Women's Player of the Year ==
Year	Player	Club
2009	Nompumelelo Nyandeni	
2010	Janine van Wyk	

== Young Women's Player of the Year ==
Year	Player	Club
2009		
2010	Jermaine Seoposenwe	

== Coach of the Year ==
Year	Coach	Team
2009	Gavin Hunt	(South Africa) Supersport United
2010	Solly Luvhengo	South Africa under 17 national football team and South Africa under 17 women's national football team
