= Katlego Mphela =

South African soccer player (born 1984)

Personal information
- Full name: Katlego Abel Mphela
- Date of birth: 29 November 1984 (age 41)
- Place of birth: Brits, South Africa
- Height: 1.82 m (6 ft 0 in)
- Position: Forward

Youth career
- Early Birds
- Arcadia Shepherds
- Orlando Pirates
- Jomo Cosmos

Senior career*
Years	Team	Apps	(Gls)
2003–2004	Jomo Cosmos	2	(1)
2004–2006	Strasbourg	19	(5)
2005–2006	→ Reims (loan)	5	(2)
2006–2008	SuperSport United	62	(10)
2008–2014	Mamelodi Sundowns	116	(48)
2014–2015	Kaizer Chiefs	15	(3)
2015–2017	Royal Eagles	28	(9)
Total		247	(78)

International career
2005–2007	South Africa U-23	7	(5)
2005–2013	South Africa	53	(23)
- * Club domestic league appearances and goals

Katlego Abel Mphela (born 29 November 1984) is a South African retired professional footballer who played as a forward.

== Club career ==
Mphela, a product of Jomo Cosmos, played in France for RC Strasbourg Alsace and Stade de Reims, both with limited success.

After returning home he turned out for SuperSport United for the 2007–08 season before joining Mamelodi Sundowns the following season. He then finished the 2009–10 season with 17 goals in 30 games which made him the league's top goalscorer. He won the Lesley Manyathela Golden Boot and was voted PSL Players' Player of the Season.

Mphela joined Chiefs in 2014. He made his debut in a 2–2 draw against Maritzburg United. He scored his first goal for Chiefs against Free State Stars but it was cancelled out almost immediately in a 1–1 draw. Mphela scored on the last league match of the season in the 55th minute against AmaZulu in a 3–0 win.

After two years out of action, 34-year old Mphela announced his retirement in August 2019. He also announced, that he would begin as a coach and that he already was coaching youth players.

== International career ==
Mphela received his first call-up to the South Africa national team for the 2005 COSAFA Cup. He made his international debut against Seychelles on 26 February 2005, scoring twice in the match. He added a third international goal the following day in a 1–0 victory over Mauritius, becoming the first South African player to score in each of his first two international appearances. He subsequently featured in the 2006 FIFA World Cup qualifiers against Ghana, a 2–0 defeat, and a friendly against Senegal, which ended in a 1–1 draw.

In January 2006, Mphela was selected by coach Ted Dumitru for South Africa's 23-man squad for the 2006 Africa Cup of Nations in Egypt. South Africa endured a disappointing campaign, with internal disputes disrupting the team's preparations. Mphela was an unused substitute in the opening group match against Guinea before making his tournament debut as a substitute against Tunisia on 26 January, a match South Africa lost 2–0. He subsequently started the final group match, a 1–0 defeat to Zambia, as South Africa were eliminated in the group stage.

Following the tournament, Mphela's international career stalled amid inconsistent club form. He was not selected for South Africa's matches in 2006 and 2007, apart from a 2-1 friendly defeat to Egypt on 15 November 2006, when he was called up by caretaker coach Pitso Mosimane. He returned to the national team in January 2008 for a friendly against Mozambique, South Africa's second-last match before the 2008 Africa Cup of Nations. Mphela was subsequently included in Carlos Alberto Parreira's 23-man squad for the tournament in Ghana, despite having not scored for the national team since February 2005. He made his only appearance of the tournament as a substitute in South Africa's second match against Tunisia, scoring his side's consolation goal in a 3-1 defeat. South Africa were eliminated in the group stage after finishing bottom of their group, while Mphela remained a fringe member of the squad.

Mphela's fortunes changed during the 2009 FIFA Confederations Cup, hosted by South Africa. Although he was included in the squad, he did not feature in any of the team's three group-stage matches against Iraq, New Zealand and Spain. He made his tournament debut as a late substitute in the semi-final against Brazil, replacing Siphiwe Tshabalala in the closing stages of South Africa's 1–0 defeat. He again started on the bench in the third-place play-off against Spain, but made a decisive impact after coming on as a substitute. Mphela scored in the 73rd minute to give South Africa the lead and later equalised in stoppage time with a long-range free kick, making it 2–2 and sending the match into extra time. Spain eventually won 3–2 after Xabi Alonso scored the decisive goal. Mphela's two goals against Spain made him South Africa's joint-top scorer at the tournament and established him as an important attacking option ahead of the 2010 FIFA World Cup. His stoppage-time free kick attracted particular attention and was subsequently nominated for the 2009 FIFA Puskás Award. He continued to feature regularly for the national team in the build-up to the World Cup and scored the winning goal in a 1–0 friendly victory over Madagascar in September 2009, ending South Africa's six-match losing streak.

As hosts of the 2010 World Cup, South Africa did not take part in the qualification process and instead played a number friendly matches in preparation for the tournament, with Mphela featuring regularly in the starting line-up. He enjoyed a prolific year in 2010, scoring 10 goals and finishing just one goal short of Benni McCarthy's record for the most goals scored by a South African player in a calendar year. During the country's final preparations, he scored twice in a 4-0 victory over Thailand and netted the winner in a 2-1 victory over Colombia. On 31 May 2010, he took his tally to five goals in four international appearances by scoring twice in a 5-0 friendly victory over Guatemala at the Estadio Mateo Flores. Mphela was included in South Africa's 23 man final squad for the World Cup. He then scored again in South Africa's final warm-up match before the World Cup, a 1-0 victory over Denmark. He played in the inaugural match of the tournament against Mexico, which ended 1–1. Next, Bafana Bafana played against Uruguay, but they lost the game 3–0. In their final group game, he scored the 2nd goal in a 2–1 win against France as South Africa exited the competition.

Following the World Cup, Mphela returned to the national team under new coach Pitso Mosimane. An admirer of the striker, Mosimane sought to build his attack around Mphela, who responded by scoring the only goal in the coach's first match in charge, a 1-0 friendly victory over Ghana. He subsequently scored his 18th international goal, netting the opener in a 2-0 victory over Niger on 4 September 2010 during the 2012 African Cup of Nations qualification campaign. Later in the same campaign, Mphela scored a 93rd-minute winner in a 1–0 victory over Egypt, securing South Africa’s first competitive win against the Egyptians. The result strengthened Bafana Bafana’s qualification hopes, while the goal took Mphela’s international tally to 19, moving him past Phil Masinga into third place on the national team’s all-time scoring list. However, South Africa’s hopes of reaching the tournament ended after a 0–0 home draw against Sierra Leone in their final qualifier.

South Africa’s failure to qualify for the continental tournament, coupled with the team’s poor start to their 2014 FIFA World Cup qualifying campaign, led to Mosimane’s dismissal. His replacement, Gordon Igesund, continued to include Mphela in his squads.However, increased competition for places and a series of injuries affected his position in the national team. The emergence of players such as Tokelo Rantie and Lehlohonolo Majoro saw Igesund increasingly favour either player alongside Bernard Parker, leaving Mphela to settle for a place on the bench by the time the 2013 African Cup of Nations came around.

In the warm-up match against Algeria ahead of the tournament, Mphela made his 50th appearance for South Africa and was subsequently named in the 23-man squad. He appeared in all three of South Africa's group-stage matches but failed to score and did not feature in the quarter-final against Mali on 2 February 2013, which saw South Africa eliminated after a 3-1 defeat on penalties.

The tournament proved to be Mphela's last involvement with the national team. He won a total of 53 caps for South Africa and scored 23 goals, finishing as the nation's joint third highest goalscorer alongside Bernard Parker, behind Shaun Bartlett and Benni McCarthy. His international goalscoring record also gave him an average of approximately 0.43 goals per game.

== Style of play ==
His style of play includes challenging defenders with both pace and strength but he can still play deep as a supporting striker. He is nicknamed "Killer" for his finishing ability.

== Career statistics ==
=== International goals ===
Scores and results list South Africa's goal tally first, score column indicates score after each Mphela goal.

List of international goals scored by Katlego Mphela
No.	Date	Venue	Opponent	Score	Result	Competition
1	26 February 2005	Stade George V, Curepipe, Mauritius	Seychelles	1–0	3–0	2005 COSAFA Cup
2	26 February 2005	Stade George V, Curepipe, Mauritius	Seychelles	2–0	3–0	2005 COSAFA Cup
3	27 February 2005	Stade George V, Curepipe, Mauritius	Mauritius	1–0	1–0	2005 COSAFA Cup
4	27 January 2008	Tamale Stadium, Tamale, Ghana	Tunisia	1–3	1–3	2008 Africa Cup of Nations
5	28 June 2009	Royal Bafokeng Stadium, Rustenburg, South Africa	Spain	1–0	2–3	2009 FIFA Confederations Cup
6	28 June 2009	Royal Bafokeng Stadium, Rustenburg, South Africa	Spain	2–2	2–3	2009 FIFA Confederations Cup
7	12 August 2009	Super Stadium, Pretoria, South Africa	Serbia	1–3	1–3	Friendly
8	19 September 2009	Griquas Park, Kimberley, South Africa	Madagascar	1–0	1–0	Friendly
9	3 March 2010	Moses Mabhida Stadium, Durban, South Africa	Namibia	1–1	1–1	Friendly
10	16 May 2010	Mbombela Stadium, Nelspruit, South Africa	Thailand	2–0	4–0	Friendly
11	16 May 2010	Mbombela Stadium, Nelspruit, South Africa	Thailand	3–0	4–0	Friendly
12	27 May 2010	Soccer City, Johannesburg, South Africa	Colombia	2–1	2–1	Friendly
13	31 May 2010	Peter Mokaba Stadium, Polokwane, South Africa	Guatemala	1–0	5–0	Friendly
14	31 May 2010	Peter Mokaba Stadium, Polokwane, South Africa	Guatemala	4–0	5–0	Friendly
15	5 June 2010	Atteridgeville Super Stadium, Atteridgeville, South Africa	Denmark	1–0	1–0	Friendly
16	22 June 2010	Free State Stadium, Bloemfontein, South Africa	France	2–0	2–1	2010 FIFA World Cup
17	11 August 2010	Soccer City, Johannesburg, South Africa	Ghana	1–0	1–0	Friendly
18	4 September 2010	Mbombela Stadium, Nelspruit, South Africa	Niger	1–0	2–0	2012 Africa Cup of Nations qualification
19	26 March 2011	Ellis Park Stadium, Johannesburg, South Africa	Egypt	1–0	1–0	2012 Africa Cup of Nations qualification
20	10 August 2011	Ellis Park Stadium, Johannesburg, South Africa	Burkina Faso	1–0	3–0	Friendly
21	10 August 2011	Ellis Park Stadium, Johannesburg, South Africa	Burkina Faso	3–0	3–0	Friendly
22	12 November 2011	Nelson Mandela Bay Stadium, Port Elizabeth, South Africa	Ivory Coast	1–1	1–1	Friendly
23	3 June 2012	Royal Bafokeng Stadium, Rustenburg, South Africa	Ethiopia	1–1	1–1	2014 FIFA World Cup qualification
