= Itumeleng Khune =

South African soccer player (born 1987)

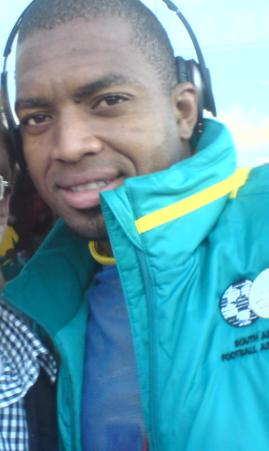
- Khune before a match against Poland in 2012

Personal information
- Full name: Itumeleng Isaac Khune
- Date of birth: 20 June 1987 (age 39)
- Place of birth: Ventersdorp, South Africa
- Height: 1.81 m (5 ft 11 in)
- Position: Goalkeeper

Youth career
- 1999–2004: Kaizer Chiefs

Senior career*
Years	Team	Apps	(Gls)
2004–2024	Kaizer Chiefs	286	(0)

International career^{‡}
2008–2020	South Africa	91	(0)
2016	South Africa Olympic	3	(0)
- * Club domestic league appearances and goals as of 11 June 2024 ‡ National team caps and goals as of 11 June 2023

Itumeleng Isaac Khune (born 20 June 1987) is a South African former professional football player who spent his entire career as goalkeeper for Kaizer Chiefs in the Premier Soccer League, and also the South African national team. He is often hailed as one of the best goalkeepers in South Africa, nicknamed "Mzansi's number one".

Khune shot to fame when he saved three penalties from Esrom Nyandoro and Peter Ndlovu against Mamelodi Sundowns in the Telkom Knockout final on 1 December 2007. He is also well known for saving a David Villa penalty and proceeding to make a double save in the 2009 FIFA Confederations Cup group stage match against Spain a day before his 22nd birthday on 20 June 2009. On 16 June 2010 against Uruguay, Khune became the second goalkeeper in the history of the FIFA World Cup to be sent off. He is also famous for performing a René Higuita scorpion kick save in a league victory over Mpumalanga Black Aces on 28 October 2015, which made rounds in England. Khune is known for his quick reflexes and his distribution which has been hailed as "the best you will see anywhere" by former Liverpool goalkeeper Sander Westerveld.

== Personal life ==
Khune was born in Tshing, Ventersdorp in the North West as one of six children of Elias and Flora Khune. He is of Tswana heritage. His father Elias, worked as a driver at a mine in Carletonville and also played amateur football as a striker. Unlike many South African players who cite kicking a football on their hometown's dusty streets as their starting point, Khune was in love with cricket idolising Nicky Boje. He eventually decided to pursue a career in football to earn a living for him and his family. He attended New Nation, Westridge, St Barnabas and RW Fick High Schools. His younger brother Lucky Khune previously played as a striker for Chiefs and currently for PSL side Chippa United. In 2019 Khune and his wife Sphelele Makhunga got married traditionally.

== Club career ==
Khune started out as a striker when he arrived for trials at Chiefs in 1999, but assumed the gloves by chance after he experienced chest problems during a junior game and found himself being reduced to a ball boy. Diving for balls that had missed the target he caught the attention of youth coach Terror Sephoa who converted him to a goalkeeper. In 2004, he was promoted to the first team.

After three years of waiting to get any game time, Khune finally got his opportunity in the early stages of the 2007–08 season after the departure of number one goalkeeper Rowen Fernandez to German club Arminia Bielefeld. With the experienced Emile Baron often plagued by injuries, Khune was made number one by then Chiefs coach Muhsin Ertugral. He made his PSL debut against Jomo Cosmos on 25 August 2007. His first season in the top-flight was highly successful as several match-winning displays for his side earned him a host of individual awards with Chiefs having the best defensive record in the league conceding only 19 goals in 30 games.

In his second season, he often struggled to regain the form and consistency of the previous season even though Chiefs managed to finish third in the standings and win the MTN 8.

During the 2009–10 season a finger injury sidelined Khune for three months giving understudy Arthur Bartman a chance to play regularly in his absence.

In October 2011, Khune was assigned as captain replacing Jimmy Tau. The 2012–13 season was arguably his best with Khune leading his side to a league and cup double. He was also voted into Goal.com's Goal50 which is a list of the best players of 2013. He was ranked 45th ahead of Fernandinho, Robbie Keane, and Frank Lampard and behind Andrea Pirlo, Roman Weidenfeller, Victor Wanyama and James Rodríguez who were all ranked from 40 to 50. He made his 200th appearance for Chiefs against Mpumalanga Black Aces in 2014. Prior to that match he had 91 clean sheets in 199 games and at the beginning of the season, he had played 172 games for Chiefs. In the 2013–14 season he won the Goalkeeper of the Year award for the second time in a row with 15 goals conceded and 18 clean sheets in 25 starts beating Moeneeb Josephs and Anssi Jakkola. Around July 2014 he was linked to a move to Bundesliga club Hannover 96. On 3 September 2014, Khune was diagnosed with a Grade 3 stress fracture which he initially suffered from since February 2014. His injury cost him his place in the 2015 African Cup of Nations. He was declared fit to play on 23 February 2015 although he did suffer a minor injury after clashing Morgan Gould's studs to his ribs which left a mark in a 4–0 win over Edu Sports in the Nedbank Cup. On 9 April 2015 in a 1–0 win over AmaZulu, Khune was controversially sent off in the 82nd minute in a game which also produced nine yellow cards – after receiving two cautions in quick succession from referee Phillip Tinyane at Peter Mokaba Stadium. Khune was first booked for time-wasting before being given his marching orders for showing dissent at the decision. Khune took to Twitter saying: "@OfficialPSL I did nothing wrong. You guys need to take action against these poor referees. "It's about time action is taken against these referees by @OfficialPSL. They've been very poor since beginning of the season. It's unfair how we are painted bad for our actions on the field but we are provoked by these referees, [you] can call me names but I stand for what is right." The league then afforded Khune five days to explain his comments although Khune did issue a public apology.

Khune initially did not renew his contract with Kaizer Chiefs when it expired in June 2015, however, after a long period of negotiations, he returned to the club on 30 July 2015, signing a new contract.

== International career ==
Khune began his international career with South Africa at youth level when he was selected for the Under-17 team in 2002, following his performances for Gauteng in the interprovincial tournament. There, he competed with fellow goalkeeper Senzo Meyiwa for the number-one position. Meyiwa initially held the advantage, but Khune gradually established himself as he progressed through the national youth teams.

By the time he reached the under-20 level, Khune had emerged as the first-choice goalkeeper. He was part of the South African team that competed at the 2005 Cosafa U20 Championship, where he helped his country finish fourth after conceding three goals in five matches. His performances earned him the Goalkeeper of the Tournament Award.

Khune was also introduced to the Under-23 setup during the same period, making his debut under former Under-20 coach Steve Komphela. He subsequently became a regular for the Under-23 team during their campaign to qualify for the 2008 Summer Olympics in Beijing. South Africa ultimately failed to qualify for the tournament, bringing Khune's youth career to an end.

Khune received his first senior call-up in 2007 when Carlos Alberto Parreira selected him for the 2007 COSAFA Cup. He did not feature as South Africa won the tournament and initially served as a backup to Moeneeb Josephs. However, his breakthrough at Kaizer Chiefs attracted Parreira's attention, earning him a place in the squad for the 2008 Africa Cup of Nations. Khune again remained unused, as Josephs started in goal and South Africa finished bottom of Group D with two points.

He finally made his senior international debut on 11 March 2008 in a friendly against Zimbabwe, helping South Africa to a 2-1 victory. Parreira resigned the following month to return to Brazil to care for his ill wife, and Joel Santana succeeded him as head coach. Under Santana, Khune became South Africa's first-choice goalkeeper. He played in all but one of South Africa's qualifying matches for the 2010 Africa Cup of Nations, but the team failed to reach the finals. Despite this setback, Khune consolidated his position as the national team's first-choice goalkeeper and retained it until the end of his international career.

He was chosen as the first-choice goalkeeper in the South African squad at the 2009 FIFA Confederations Cup. He played in all five of South Africa's matches at the tournament, keeping clean sheets in the opening group stage matches against Iraq and New Zealand respectively, and saving a penalty of David Villa from Spain in the final group stage match.Although South Africa lost 2-0, they still qualified for the knockout stage. In the semi-final against Brazil, Khune made several important saves, only to be beaten by a free kick from Dani Alves in the 88th minute. South Africa subsequently faced Spain in the third-place playoff, where Khune again started as South Africa lost 3-2 after extra time, finishing fourth at the tournament.

Khune was once again selected as first choice goalkeeper at the 2010 FIFA World Cup and made some good saves in the opening match against Mexico. However, on 16 June 2010, he was sent off against Uruguay when he tripped striker Luis Suárez inside the penalty area in the 77th minute. He became the second goalkeeper to be sent off in the history of the FIFA World Cup, joining Gianluca Pagliuca who saw red in 1994. This was the first red card of his career. Khune subsequently missed South Africa's final group game against France, where Moeneeb Josephs deputised as Bafana Bafana won 2–1 to restore some pride as they became the first host nation to exit the tournament at the opening stage.

In spite of heavy competition from Josephs, Khune regained the starting goalkeeping spot after the World Cup and played in all of South Africa's matches in the 2012 African Cup of Nations qualifiers as South Africa failed to qualify for the finals in Gabon and Equatorial Guinea. He also appeared in all six of their matches in the 2014 FIFA World Cup qualifiers, but South Africa again failed to qualify.

With South Africa automatically qualifying for the 2013 African Cup of Nations as hosts, the national team did not take part in the qualifying campaign and instead used a series of friendly matches to prepare for the tournament. Khune started in most of these matches and reached the milestone of 50 international appearances in a 0-0 draw against Algeria on 12 January 2013. He continued as South Africa's first choice goalkeeper in the tournament and kept two clean sheets in a goalless draw against Cape Verde and 2–0 victory against Angola. The victory marked South Africa's first win in the competition since the 2004 edition. A 2-2 draw against Morocco in their final Group A match secured top spot and sent the country into the knockout stages for the first time in 11 years.Their tournament ended in the quarter-finals, however, following a 1-1 draw with Mali and a subsequent 3-1 defeat in the penalty shoot-out.

Following the tournament, captain Bongani Khumalo was dropped from the squad due to a lack of game time, and coach Gordon Igesund subsequently appointed Khune as captain, initially for South Africa's World Cup qualifier against the Central African Republic in March 2013.He was later confirmed as the team's permanent captain in May. Khune subsequently led South Africa at the 2014 African Nations Championship, but suffered an ankle injury during a 1-1 draw with Mali and was unable to take any further part in the competition.

In 2016, Khune was selected as one of South Africa's overage players for the 2016 Summer Olympics. He arrived at the tournament as the player with the most international experience, alongside Nigeria's Mikel John Obi, with 75 national team caps to his name. He was instrumental in his nation's opening match draw against Brazil, making a number of saves from Brazil captain Neymar.

== Style of play ==
FifaPlayerRatings.com rates Khune in the top 10 of the goalkeepers in FIFA 15 and 525th overall. Khune is described as a player with "higher than normal diving skills and reflexes, making him a skilled close-shot and free-kick stopper with elite kicking abilities and accurate goal kicks and punts, taking pressure off his defense and creating attacking opportunities for his offense. He is technically skilled with his weak foot as well, which will allow him to accurately clear the ball with either foot when under pressure."

== Outside football ==
He donated R150 000 to an old age home in his hometown of Ventersdorp, North West. He was accompanied by Minister of Sports and Recreation, Fikile Mbalula, George Lebese and George Maluleka.

== Honours ==
Kaizer Chiefs

- Premier Soccer League: 2004–05, 2012–13, 2014–15
- ABSA Cup/Nedbank Cup: 2006, 2013
- Coca-Cola Cup/Telkom Knockout: 2004, 2007, 2009, 2010
- SAA Supa 8/MTN 8: 2006, 2008, 2014,

Individual

- PSL Footballer of the Year: 2012–13
- PSL Players' Player of the Season: 2007–08, 2012–13
- PSL Club Rookie of the Year: 2007–08
- SA Sports Awards Sportsman of the Year: 2013
- SA Sports Awards Newcomer of the Year: 2008
- Telkom Knockout Player of the Tournament: 2007
- Telkom Knockout Goalkeeper of the Tournament: 2007
- Premier Soccer League Goalkeeper of the Season: 2007–08, 2012–13,2013–14
- Kaizer Chiefs Player of the Season: 2007–08, 2012–13
- Kaizer Chiefs Player's Player of the Season: 2007–08, 2012–13
- Nedbank Cup Player of the Tournament: 2013
