= Thabang Molefe =

South African soccer player

Personal information
- Full name: Thabang Molefe
- Date of birth: 11 April 1979 (age 47)
- Place of birth: Potchefstroom, South Africa
- Height: 1.80 m (5 ft 11 in)
- Position: Defender

Senior career*
Years	Team	Apps	(Gls)
1999	HIT Gorica	5	(0)
1999–2002	Jomo Cosmos	82	(0)
2002	Lyn Oslo		
2002–2003	Jomo Cosmos	20	(0)
2003–2005	Le Mans	25	(1)
2005–2006	Orlando Pirates	16	(0)

International career
2002–2004	South Africa	20	(0)
- * Club domestic league appearances and goals

Thabang Molefe (born 11 April 1979) is a retired South African football player.

He played for HIT Gorica, Jomo Cosmos, FC Lyn Oslo, Le Mans UC (Note: Thabang Molefe – French league stats at LFP – also available in French (archived)) and Orlando Pirates.

Molefe also played for the South Africa national football team and was a participant at the 2002 FIFA World Cup.

During international duty with South Africa, Molefe tackled David Beckham who fell awkwardly in a challenge and was substituted early in the second half of the friendly match before being taken to hospital. Beckham, England captain at the time, suffered a fractured wrist as a result of the challenge.
