= Moeneeb Josephs =

South African soccer player (born 1980)

Personal information
- Full name: Moeneeb Josephs
- Date of birth: 19 May 1980 (age 46)
- Place of birth: Cape Town, South Africa
- Height: 1.84 m (6 ft 0 in)
- Position: Goalkeeper

Youth career
- Westdale
- Westridge Rovers
- Cape Town Spurs

Senior career*
Years	Team	Apps	(Gls)
1997–1999	Cape Town Spurs	21	(0)
1999–2006	Ajax Cape Town	115	(0)
2006–2008	Wits University	55	(0)
2008–2013	Orlando Pirates	103	(0)
2013–2018	Bidvest Wits	95	(0)
2018–2019	AmaZulu	7	(0)
Total		396	(0)

International career
2003–2014	South Africa	24	(0)
- * Club domestic league appearances and goals

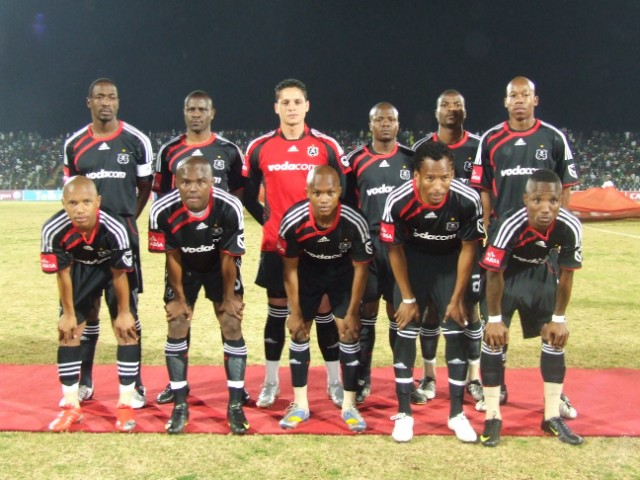
Moeneeb Josephs in Red

Moeneeb Josephs (pronounced Muh'Neeb; born 19 May 1980) is a South African former professional soccer player who played as a goalkeeper.

== Club career ==
Josephs began his career with Cape Town Spurs at the age of 17 in 1997 and played for its successor Ajax Cape Town for seven years. In 2006, he moved to Gauteng where he played for Bidvest Wits for two years before moving to Orlando Pirates for a record-breaking fee.

== International career ==
Josephs has played at international level for South Africa national team and was South Africa's number one goalkeeper at the 2008 African Cup of Nations replacing the injured Rowen Fernandez.

He did not make the final squad for the 2009 FIFA Confederations Cup, but earned selection to the squad for the 2010 FIFA World Cup at Fernandez's expense. He was not expected to see much playing time as back-up to Itumeleng Khune, but on 16 June 2010 he was called on as a 79th-minute substitute for Steven Pienaar following Khune's sending-off against Uruguay. Josephs was powerless to stop the resultant penalty from Diego Forlán as Bafana Bafana lost the match 3–0 with two goals from Forlan and a stoppage-time strike from Álvaro Pereira. Khune's suspension meant that Josephs played in South Africa's final group game against France, where they won 2–1 but were eliminated from the World Cup.

On 24 May 2012, he announced his retirement from international football.

He was called back after two years by Gordon Igesund for CHAN 2014 hosted in South Africa and he played a full match in final group stage against Nigeria in 3–1 defeat in a place of injured Itumeleng Khune. That was his final game for Bafana and he was personally criticized together with Lerato Chabangu for a loss against Nigeria by Minister of Sport and Recreation Fikile Mbalula, when he said "Bafana Bafana are weak, useless and they are the bunch of losers individual"."

== Personal life ==
Josephs hails from Mitchell's Plain on the Cape Flats. Josephs is Muslim.
