= Thanduyise Khuboni =

South African footballer (born 1986)

Personal information
- Full name: Thanduyise Abraham Khuboni
- Date of birth: 22 May 1986 (age 40)
- Place of birth: Clermont, South Africa
- Height: 1.81 m (5 ft 11 in)
- Position: Defensive midfielder

Youth career
- Nylon City
- KwaDabeka FC
- Fubs
- Young Mates

Senior career*
Years	Team	Apps	(Gls)
2006–2014	Golden Arrows	196	(16)
2014–2016	Mpumalanga Black Aces	34	(2)
2016–2017	Highlands Park	22	(2)
2020	Uthongathi	1	(0)
Total		259	(21)

International career^{‡}
2010–2014	South Africa	26	(0)
- * Club domestic league appearances and goals ‡ National team caps and goals as of 18:28, 27 July 2020 (UTC)

Thanduyise Abraham Khuboni (born 22 May 1986) is a South African soccer player who plays as a midfielder.

== Playing career ==
Khuboni spent his youth career at a number of local amateur clubs before joining Golden Arrows in 2006. He was part of the Arrows team that won the 2009 MTN 8 Cup. Khuboni played in every minute of Arrows' 30 games in the 2011–12 season. In January 2013, Khuboni was linked with a transfer to an unnamed German Bundesliga club as his contract was expiring at the end of the season. Arrows subsequently exercised a 1-year option they had on his contract, thus tying him to the club until the end of the 2013–14 season.

== International career ==
Khuboni made his international debut for South Africa on 27 January 2010 in a 3–0 victory against Zimbabwe in a friendly match played in Durban. He was part of the South African squad for the 2010 FIFA World Cup and played in their final group stage match against France.
