= Cyril Nzama =

South African soccer player (born 1974)

Personal information
- Full name: Cyril Nzama
- Date of birth: 26 June 1974 (age 52)
- Place of birth: Soweto, South Africa
- Height: 1.82 m (5 ft 11 1/2 in)
- Position: Centre-back

Youth career
- 1988–1993: Pimville Hotspurs
- 1994–1995: Rabali Blackpool

Senior career*
Years	Team	Apps	(Gls)
1995–2000	Bush Bucks	116	(1)
2000–2008	Kaizer Chiefs	183	(9)
2008–2010	Bay United		
2010–2011	Batau FC		

International career
1994	South Africa u-20	1	(0)
2000–2007	South Africa	44	(0)
- * Club domestic league appearances and goals

Cyril "Skhokho" Nzama (born 26 June 1974) is a South African former soccer player who played as a defender.

Nzama made 44 appearances for the South African national football team from 2000 to 2007. He was also a participant at the 2002 FIFA World Cup.
