= Bongani Khumalo =

South African footballer (born 1987)

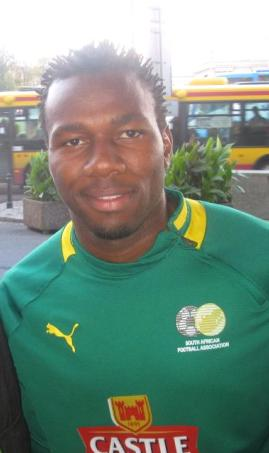
- Khumalo in 2012

Personal information
- Full name: Bongani Sandile Khumalo
- Date of birth: 6 January 1987 (age 39)
- Place of birth: Manzini, Swaziland
- Height: 1.84 m (6 ft 0 in)
- Position: Centre-back

Youth career
- ?–2005: Arcadia Shepherds

Senior career*
Years	Team	Apps	(Gls)
2005–2007	AmaTuks	50	(4)
2007–2010	SuperSport United	81	(8)
2011–2015	Tottenham Hotspur	0	(0)
2011	→ Preston North End (loan)	6	(0)
2011–2012	→ Reading (loan)	4	(0)
2012–2013	→ PAOK (loan)	22	(0)
2013–2014	→ Doncaster Rovers (loan)	30	(1)
2015	→ Colchester United (loan)	10	(0)
2015–2016	SuperSport United	9	(0)
2016–2018	Bidvest Wits	43	(3)
2018–2021	SuperSport United	30	(1)
Total		255	(16)

International career^{‡}
2008–2013	South Africa	42	(1)
- * Club domestic league appearances and goals as of 15:27, 6 July 2020 (UTC) ‡ National team caps and goals as of 15:42, 13 March 2014

Bongani Sandile Khumalo (born 6 January 1987) is a South African retired footballer who played as a centre-back.

== Early life ==
Khumalo was born in Manzini but relocated to Pretoria, South Africa during his infancy. There, his late father was a language lecturer at the University of South Africa and his mother was a teacher. During his time in Pretoria, Khumalo studied towards a degree at the University of Pretoria while embarking on a professional football career. He later had to put his studies on hold, however, following a move to England. Upon his arrival in England, Khumalo was reported to have come from an impoverished background and being one of fifteen siblings. He later denied the reports, describing his family as middle class and confirming that he was an only child.

== Club career ==
=== University of Pretoria ===
Having graduated from the Arcadia Shepherds academy, Khumalo signed for University of Pretoria in 2005. He spent two seasons at the club where he played in the National First Division and scored four goals in 50 appearances. His form during his time in with University of Pretoria caught the eye of a number of South African Premier Division sides and in 2007 he signed for SuperSport United.

=== SuperSport United ===
Following his arrival at SuperSport United, Khumalo soon established himself as an important player in Gavin Hunt's side and was later named captain of the club. Over the course of the next three seasons, he helped the club to three consecutive Premier Division and became the youngest ever player to lift the league title, at the age of 23. Khumalo's spell with the club coincided with the SuperSport United entering into an affiliation agreement with Premier League club, Tottenham Hotspur, and in 2010 he signed a pre-contract to join the London-based club in January of the following year.

==== Tottenham Hotspur ====
On 26 October 2010, it was announced that Khumalo would be joining Tottenham Hotspur in January 2011 from partner club SuperSport United after a successful trial in September, subject to a work permit for a fee of £1.5 million. Tottenham confirmed the completion of Khumalo's transfer from SuperSport United on 7 January 2011.

===== Loan moves and release =====
On 24 March 2011, Khumalo made an emergency deadline day loan move to Championship club Preston North End. He made his debut for Preston on 2 April 2011 in their 2–1 victory over Swansea.

On 25 July 2011, Khumalo moved on a season-long loan to Championship club Reading. However following the arrival of Kaspars Gorkšs from Queens Park Rangers, Khumalo's appearances were limited, and he did not play a first team game after August. On 1 February 2012, it was confirmed that Khumalo's loan would be terminated early, to allow him to return to Tottenham.

On 6 July 2012, Khumalo joined Greek club PAOK on loan, for one year.

Khumalo was signed by Doncaster Rovers of the Championship for a season's loan on 31 July 2013. On 6 August in his second game for Rovers he scored the winner in a 1−0 victory against Rochdale in the League Cup.

On 14 March 2015, Khumalo joined Colchester United on loan for the rest of the season. He made ten appearances for the Colchester Community Stadium based club before returning to Tottenham.

Khumalo was released by Tottenham Hotspur at the end of 2014–15 season, without ever playing a competitive game for the club in 4.5 years.

=== Return to South Africa ===
On 4 August 2015, it was announced that Khumalo had signed for SuperSport United, leaving Tottenham Hotspur after four years and no competitive appearances. He made 10 appearances in all competitions for SuperSport before moving to fellow Premier Soccer League side Bidvest Wits. He returned to SuperSport United in 2018

=== Retirement ===
On 21 September 2021, it was announced that he is now retiring from football.

== International career ==
Khumalo was named in the South Africa national team squad for the 2009 Confederations Cup and 2010 FIFA World Cup, both in South Africa. On 22 June 2010, he scored the first goal after 21 minutes against France as South Africa finished their World Cup campaign with a 2–1 win. Khumalo was captain of the national team at the 2013 African Cup of Nations.

=== International goals ===
Scores and results list South Africa's goal tally first, score column indicates score after each Khumalo goal.

List of international goals scored by Bongani Khumalo
No.	Date	Venue	Opponent	Score	Result	Competition
1	22 June 2010	Free State Stadium, Bloemfontein, South Africa	France	1–0	2–1	2010 FIFA World Cup
