= Siphiwe Tshabalala =

South African soccer player

Personal information
- Full name: Lawrence Siphiwe Tshabalala
- Date of birth: 25 September 1984 (age 42)
- Place of birth: Phiri, Soweto, South Africa
- Height: 1.70 m (5 ft 7 in)
- Positions: Winger; attacking midfielder

Youth career
- 1991–1994: Phiri Arsenal
- 1994–1997: Phiri Movers
- 1997–2002: Kaizer Chiefs
- 2002–2003: Moroka Swallows

Senior career*
Years	Team	Apps	(Gls)
2003–2004	Alexandra United	26	(7)
2004–2007	Free State Stars	64	(31)
2007–2018	Kaizer Chiefs	292	(48)
2018–2019	BB Erzurumspor	17	(0)
2020–2021	AmaZulu	2	(0)
Total		401	(86)

International career^{‡}
2006–2017	South Africa	90	(12)
- * Club domestic league appearances and goals as of 16:18, 13 August 2021 (UTC) ‡ National team caps and goals as of 13:24, 21 June 2019 (UTC)

Lawrence Siphiwe Tshabalala (/sɪˈpiːweɪ ˌtʃæbəˈlɑːlə/ sih-PEE-way CHAB-ə-LAH-lə; born 25 September 1984) is a South African former professional soccer player who played as a midfielder.

He is considered to be one of the most well-known and decorated South African soccer players of his generation. He was the first player to make his international debut while still playing in the National First Division. At 90 caps, he is the second most capped player of the South African national team and played at three African Cup of Nations editions and the 2010 FIFA World Cup, at which he scored the opening goal of the tournament on 11 June 2010; the goal was nominated for the FIFA Puskás Award.

== Early life ==
Tshabalala was born on 25 September 1984 in Phiri as the first born of two children to parents Isaac Tshabalala (born 1964) and Hadifele Rebecca (née Makhubu) (1965–2010). His younger sister is named Mpumi. He grew up and lived in a face brick house until he was 19, that was owned by his grandparents. He lived there with his cousins and sister. His father worked as a taxi driver. He attended secondary school at Seanamarena Secondary School in Phiri, Soweto. Tshabalala aspired to be a chartered accountant as a young boy.

== Club career ==
=== Kaizer Chiefs ===
Tshabalala played at the Kaizer Chiefs academy but only broke through to the senior team after spells with Alexandra United and Free State Stars. In January 2007 Chiefs brought back their own product after Ea Lla Koto was relegated to the National First Division at the end of the 2005/06 campaign. At the time, Tshabalala was then sidelined for six months due to a serious knee injury. Tshabalala eventually made his debut in a 1–0 loss to Bidvest Wits on 31 August 2007. Tshabalala made his Soweto derby debut on 24 November 2007 in a 2–2 draw. Tshabalala played his first ever cup final on 1 December 2007 in the Telkom Knockout winning after a penalty shootout against Mamelodi Sundowns and played the full 120 minutes. He scored his first Chiefs goal on 12 December 2007 in a 4–2 win over Golden Arrows.

Tshabalala continued to consistently deliver great goals, winning him the Player and Players' Player of the Year at the Kaizer Chiefs Awards Ceremony. He also picked up the Website Player of the Year, Goal of the Season and Readers’ Choice awards. All-and-all Tshabalala left the awards with R170 000 in prize-money, as well as a Nissan X-Trail. On 25 August 2015, Tshabalala gained attention for a volleyed goal from well outside the area which was nominated as one of the goals of the South African season. The goal, which came in a 4–0 win over Free State Stars coincidentally took place at the FNB Stadium in Johannesburg, the same venue where Tshabalala had scored a similar goal against Mexico in the world cup five years earlier. He made a total of 372 appearances scoring 58 goals.

=== Büyükşehir Belediye Erzurumspor ===
On 28 August 2019, Kaizer Chiefs announced that Tshabalala would be leaving for Turkish side Büyükşehir Belediye Erzurumspor.

=== AmaZulu ===
Tshabalala returned to South Africa in October 2020, joining South African Premier Division club AmaZulu F.C. He signed a one-year contract with the option of a second year. He was released in August 2021.

== International career ==
Tshabalala was one of the first players to be called up to the South Africa national team while still playing in the National First Division. Tshabalala made his national team debut in a friendly against Egypt on 14 January 2006. He was part of the South African squad at 2006 African Nations Cup, 2008 African Nations Cup, 2013 African Nations Cup, and the 2009 FIFA Confederations Cup. On 11 June 2010, gaining his 50th cap for the nation of South Africa, he scored the opening goal of the 2010 FIFA World Cup against Mexico in the 55th minute, which brought great excitement to the fans of South Africa. The game finished a 1–1 draw. The goal was noted for its celebration, Tshabalala's choreographed dancing with his teammates, and eventually made the shortlist for the Puskas Award, a nomination for goal of the year by FIFA.

In October 2017, Tshabalala was called up to two of South Africa's World Cup qualifying matches against Senegal – for the first time since 2014.

== Style of play ==
Goal.com described Tshabalala as "a tricky winger with pace and can deliver fantastic crosses. His left boot can pack a powerful shot and he is a great option for set pieces as he has the ability to bend the ball".

== Endorsements ==
In October 2009, Tshabalala and Arsenal's Cesc Fàbregas were the first two players to launch the new Nike CTR360 Maestri boots.

== Personal life ==
Tshabalala's mother Rebecca Hadifele "Hadi" Makhubu (1965–2010) died on 5 December 2010, after sustaining a head injury after falling at a bridal shower which she was attending with her husband Isaac. She was buried at the Avalon Cemetery on 11 December 2010 in Soweto. The funeral was attended by notable figures such as Pitso Mosimane, Jimmy Tau, Morgan Gould as well as a performance by Joyous Celebration. A Limpopo man named Samson Nangani claimed that Tshabalala was his child and lost contact with his mother while she was still pregnant. Tshabalala denied being Nangani's son.

Tshabalala was involved in a love scandal with Zanele Khanye Skhosana and former Atlético Madrid academy player Robin Ngalande, where one of them allegedly impregnated her. Tshabalala's first child, Owami, a boy, was born on 6 February 2015 by former Miss South Africa, Bokang Montjane whom he had been dating since 2012. The pair married in 2016.

== Career statistics ==
Scores and results list South Africa's goal tally first, score column indicates score after each Tshabalala goal.

List of international goals scored by Siphiwe Tshabalala
No.	Date	Venue	Opponent	Score	Result	Competition
1	26 March 2008	Lucas Masterpieces Moripe Stadium, Atteridgeville, South Africa	Paraguay	3–0	3–0	Friendly
2	11 October 2008	Estadio de Malabo, Malabo, Equatorial Guinea	Equatorial Guinea	1–0	1–0	2010 FIFA World Cup qualification
3	28 March 2009	Royal Bafokeng Stadium, Phokeng, South Africa	Norway	2–1	2–1	Friendly
4	27 January 2010	Moses Mabhida Stadium, Durban, South Africa	Zimbabwe	1–0	3–0	Friendly
5	31 March 2010	Estadio Defensores del Chaco Asunción, Paraguay	Paraguay	1–1	1–1	Friendly
6	16 May 2010	Mbombela Stadium, Nelspruit, South Africa	Thailand	1–0	4–0	Friendly
7	11 June 2010	FNB Stadium, Johannesburg, South Africa	Mexico	1–0	1–1	2010 FIFA World Cup
8	10 August 2011	Ellis Park Stadium, Johannesburg, South Africa	Burkina Faso	2–0	3–0	Friendly
9	15 June 2012	Mbombela Stadium, Nelspruit, South Africa	Gabon	1–0	3–0	Friendly
10	22 December 2012	Moses Mabhida Stadium, Durban, South Africa	Malawi	2–0	3–1	Friendly
11	8 June 2013	Stade Ahmadou Ahidjo, Yaoundé, Cameroon	Central African Republic	2–0	3–0	2014 FIFA World Cup qualification
12	17 August 2013	FNB Stadium, Johannesburg, South Africa	Burkina Faso	1–0	2–0	Friendly

== Honours ==
Free State Stars

- Baymed Cup: 2006

Kaizer Chiefs

- Absa Premiership: 2012–13, 2014–15
- MTN 8: 2008
- Nedbank Cup: 2013
- Telkom Knockout: 2007, 2010, 2011
- Vodacom Challenge: 2009
- Telkom Charity Cup: 2010

Individual

- SAFA Awards SAFA Footballer of the Year: 2010

Sporting positions
Preceded by Philip Lahm	FIFA World Cup opening goal 2010	Succeeded by Marcelo (own goal)
