= 2009 FIFA Confederations Cup knockout stage =

Knockout stage of the 2009 FIFA Confederations Cup

The knockout stage of the 2009 FIFA Confederations Cup began on 24 June and concluded on 28 June 2009 with the final at the Ellis Park Stadium, Johannesburg. It was the second and final stage of the 2009 FIFA Confederations Cup, following the group stage. The top two teams from each group (four teams in total) advanced to the knockout stage to compete in a single-elimination style tournament. A third-place match was included and played between the two losing teams of the semi-finals.

In the knockout stage (including the final), if a match was level at the end of 90 minutes, extra time of two periods (15 minutes each) would be played. If the score was still level after extra time, the match would be decided by a penalty shoot-out.

== Qualified teams ==
Group	Winners	Runners-up
A	Spain	South Africa
B	Brazil	United States

== Bracket ==
Semi-finals
24 June – Bloemfontein
Spain	0
United States	2
25 June – Johannesburg
Brazil	1
South Africa	0

Final
28 June – Johannesburg
United States	2
Brazil	3
Third place
28 June – Rustenburg
Spain (aet)	3
South Africa	2

== Semi-finals ==
=== Spain v United States ===
24 June 2009
20:30 SAST

Spain	0–2	United States
	Report	Altidore 27'; Dempsey 74'

Free State Stadium, Bloemfontein
Attendance: 35,369
Referee: Jorge Larrionda (Uruguay)

Spain	United States

GK	1	Iker Casillas (c)
RB	15	Sergio Ramos
CB	3	Gerard Piqué	(yellow card) 89'
CB	5	Carles Puyol
LB	11	Joan Capdevila	(yellow card) 36'
DM	14	Xabi Alonso
RM	10	Cesc Fàbregas		(substituted off) 68'
LM	18	Albert Riera		(substituted off) 78'
AM	8	Xavi
SS	7	David Villa
CF	9	Fernando Torres
Substitutions:
MF	20	Santi Cazorla		(substituted on) 68'
MF	22	Juan Mata		(substituted on) 78'
Manager:
Vicente del Bosque

GK	1	Tim Howard
RB	21	Jonathan Spector
CB	15	Jay DeMerit
CB	5	Oguchi Onyewu
LB	3	Carlos Bocanegra (c)
CM	13	Ricardo Clark
CM	12	Michael Bradley	(red card) 87'
RW	8	Clint Dempsey		(substituted off) 88'
LW	10	Landon Donovan	(yellow card) 5'
CF	9	Charlie Davies		(substituted off) 69'
CF	17	Jozy Altidore	(yellow card) 28'	(substituted off) 83'
Substitutions:
MF	22	Benny Feilhaber		(substituted on) 69'
FW	4	Conor Casey		(substituted on) 83'
DF	2	Jonathan Bornstein		(substituted on) 88'
Manager:
Bob Bradley

Man of the Match:
Clint Dempsey (United States)

Assistant referees:
Pablo Fandiño (Uruguay)
Mauricio Espinosa (Uruguay)
Fourth official:
Coffi Codjia (Benin)
Fifth official:
Alexis Fassinou (Benin)

=== Brazil v South Africa ===
25 June 2009
20:30 SAST

Brazil	1–0	South Africa
Dani Alves 88'	Report

Ellis Park Stadium, Johannesburg
Attendance: 48,049
Referee: Massimo Busacca (Switzerland)

Brazil	South Africa

GK	1	Júlio César
RB	2	Maicon
CB	3	Lúcio (c)
CB	14	Luisão
LB	16	André Santos	(yellow card) 61'	(substituted off) 82'
DM	8	Gilberto Silva
CM	5	Felipe Melo	(yellow card) 31'
CM	18	Ramires
AM	10	Kaká
SS	11	Robinho
CF	9	Luís Fabiano		(substituted off) 90+2'
Substitutions:
DF	13	Dani Alves	(yellow card) 88'	(substituted on) 82'
MF	20	Kléberson		(substituted on) 90+2'
Manager:
Dunga

GK	16	Itumeleng Khune
RB	2	Siboniso Gaxa
CB	4	Aaron Mokoena (c)
CB	14	Matthew Booth
LB	3	Tsepo Masilela	(yellow card) 45'
CM	5	Benson Mhlongo
CM	13	Kagisho Dikgacoi
RW	10	Steven Pienaar		(substituted off) 90+3'
AM	8	Siphiwe Tshabalala		(substituted off) 90+1'
LW	12	Teko Modise		(substituted off) 90+1'
CF	17	Bernard Parker
Substitutions:
FW	9	Katlego Mphela		(substituted on) 90+1'
FW	21	Katlego Mashego		(substituted on) 90+1'
MF	11	Elrio van Heerden		(substituted on) 90+3'
Manager:
(Brazil) Joel Santana

Man of the Match:
Steven Pienaar (South Africa)

Assistant referees:
Matthias Arnet (Switzerland)
Francesco Buragina (Switzerland)
Fourth official:
Benito Archundia (Mexico)
Fifth official:
Héctor Vergara (Canada)

== Match for third place ==
28 June 2009
15:00 SAST

Spain	3–2 (a.e.t.)	South Africa
Güiza 88', 89'; Alonso 107'	Report	Mphela 73', 90+3'

Royal Bafokeng Stadium, Rustenburg
Attendance: 31,788
Referee: Matthew Breeze (Australia)

Spain	South Africa

GK	1	Iker Casillas (c)
RB	19	Álvaro Arbeloa
CB	3	Gerard Piqué	(yellow card) 77'
CB	2	Raúl Albiol	(yellow card) 84'
LB	11	Joan Capdevila
DM	14	Xabi Alonso
RM	20	Santi Cazorla
LM	18	Albert Riera
AM	12	Sergio Busquets	(yellow card) 39'	(substituted off) 81'
CF	9	Fernando Torres		(substituted off) 57'
CF	7	David Villa		(substituted off) 57'
Substitutions:
FW	17	Dani Güiza		(substituted on) 57'
MF	21	David Silva		(substituted on) 57'
FW	16	Fernando Llorente	(yellow card) 115'	(substituted on) 81'
Manager:
Vicente del Bosque

GK	16	Itumeleng Khune
RB	2	Siboniso Gaxa
CB	4	Aaron Mokoena (c)
CB	14	Matthew Booth
LB	3	Tsepo Masilela	(yellow card) 108'
CM	13	Kagisho Dikgacoi
CM	6	MacBeth Sibaya
RW	12	Teko Modise		(substituted off) 69'
LW	10	Steven Pienaar	(yellow card) 47'	(substituted off) 64'
SS	8	Siphiwe Tshabalala		(substituted off) 84'
CF	17	Bernard Parker
Substitutions:
FW	9	Katlego Mphela	(yellow card) 77'	(substituted on) 64'
MF	11	Elrio van Heerden		(substituted on) 69'
MF	5	Benson Mhlongo		(substituted on) 84'
Manager:
(Brazil) Joel Santana

Man of the Match:
Xabi Alonso (Spain)

Assistant referees:
Matthew Cream (Australia)
Ben Wilson (Australia)
Fourth official:
Coffi Codjia (Benin)
Fifth official:
Alexis Fassinou (Benin)

== Final ==
The 2009 FIFA Confederations Cup Final was held at Ellis Park Stadium, Johannesburg, South Africa, on 28 June 2009 and was contested by the United States and Brazil. This was the first appearance ever for the United States in the final of a FIFA men's competition. This was Brazil's fourth appearance in a Confederations Cup final (after 1997, 1999 and 2005). Brazil won their third Confederations Cup title.

Prior to the match, FIFA honoured Cameroonian midfielder Marc-Vivien Foé, who died of a heart-related disease during a FIFA Confederations Cup match in 2003.

28 June 2009
20:30 SAST

United States	2–3	Brazil
Dempsey 10'; Donovan 27'	Report	Luís Fabiano 46', 74'; Lúcio 84'

Ellis Park Stadium, Johannesburg
Attendance: 52,291
Referee: Martin Hansson (Sweden)

United States	Brazil

GK	1	Tim Howard
RB	21	Jonathan Spector
CB	5	Oguchi Onyewu
CB	15	Jay DeMerit
LB	3	Carlos Bocanegra (c)	(yellow card) 19'
CM	13	Ricardo Clark		(substituted off) 88'
CM	22	Benny Feilhaber		(substituted off) 75'
RW	8	Clint Dempsey
LW	10	Landon Donovan
SS	17	Jozy Altidore		(substituted off) 75'
CF	9	Charlie Davies
Substitutions:
DF	2	Jonathan Bornstein		(substituted on) 75'
MF	16	Sacha Kljestan		(substituted on) 75'
FW	4	Conor Casey		(substituted on) 88'
Manager:
Bob Bradley

GK	1	Júlio César
RB	2	Maicon
CB	3	Lúcio (c)	(yellow card) 69'
CB	14	Luisão
LB	16	André Santos	(yellow card) 36'	(substituted off) 66'
CM	8	Gilberto Silva
CM	5	Felipe Melo	(yellow card) 25'
RM	18	Ramires		(substituted off) 67'
AM	10	Kaká
LW	11	Robinho
CF	9	Luís Fabiano
Substitutions:
DF	13	Dani Alves		(substituted on) 66'
MF	7	Elano		(substituted on) 67'
Manager:
Dunga

Man of the Match:
Kaká (Brazil)

Assistant referees:
Henrik Andrén (Sweden)
Fredrik Nilsson (Sweden)
Fourth official:
Benito Archundia (Mexico)
Fifth official:
Héctor Vergara (Canada)
