= Spain national football team results (2000–2009) =

These are all the matches played by the Spain national football team between 2000 and 2009:

== Meaning ==
	Meaning
W.C.	FIFA World Cup
EURO	UEFA European Championship
C.C.	FIFA Confederations Cup
Q	Qualification rounds
GS	Group stage
R16	Round of 16
QF	Quarter-finals
SF	Semi-finals
3rd PO	Third place match
F	Final

== Results ==
130 matches played:

=== 2000 ===
26 January Friendly	Spain	3–0	Poland	(Spain) Cartagena (Murcia)
21:45 CET	Raúl 15'; Urzaiz 56', 58'	Report		Stadium: Cartagonova; Attendance: 15,000; Referee: (France) Éric Poulat

23 February Friendly	Croatia	0–0	Spain	(Croatia) Split
20:30 CET		Report		Stadium: Poljud; Attendance: 9,931; Referee: (Hungary) Attila Hanacsek

29 March Friendly	Spain	2–0	Italy	(Spain) Barcelona
20:30 CEST	Alfonso 61'; Abelardo 80'	Report		Stadium: Montjuïc; Attendance: 53,600; Referee: (France) Claude Colombo

3 June Friendly	Sweden	1–1	Spain	(Sweden) Gothenburg
20:00 CEST	Nilsson 74' (pen.)	Report	Guardiola 42' (pen.)	Stadium: Ullevi; Attendance: 35,215; Referee: (Italy) Fiorenzo Treossi

7 June Friendly	Luxembourg	0–1	Spain	Luxembourg City
20:00 CEST		Report	Mendieta 2'	Stadium: Josy Barthel; Attendance: 6,000; Referee: (Germany) Herbert Fandel

13 June (Belgium) (Netherlands) 2000 EURO GS	Spain	0–1	Norway	(Netherlands) Rotterdam
18:00 CEST		Report	Iversen 65'	Stadium: De Kuip; Attendance: 45,000; Referee: (Egypt) Gamal Al-Ghandour

18 June (Belgium) (Netherlands) 2000 EURO GS	Slovenia	1–2	Spain	(Netherlands) Amsterdam
18:00 CEST	Zahovič 58'	Report	Raúl 4'; Etxeberria 60'	Stadium: Amsterdam ArenA; Attendance: 45,000; Referee: (Germany) Markus Merk

21 June (Belgium) (Netherlands) 2000 EURO GS	FR Yugoslavia	3–4	Spain	(Belgium) Bruges
18:00 CEST	Milošević 30'; Govedarica 50'; Komljenović 75'	Report	Alfonso 38', 90+5'; Munitis 51'; Mendieta 90+3'	Stadium: Jan Breydel; Attendance: 22,000; Referee: (France) Gilles Veissière

25 June (Belgium) (Netherlands) 2000 EURO QF	Spain	1–2	France	(Belgium) Bruges
20:45 CEST	Mendieta 36' (pen.)	Report	Zidane 32'; Djorkaeff 43'	Stadium: Jan Breydel; Attendance: 30,000; Referee: (Italy) Pierluigi Collina

16 August Friendly	Germany	4–1	Spain	(Germany) Hanover
20:30 CEST	Scholl 24', 51'; Zickler 57', 62'	Report	Raúl 69'	Stadium: Niedersachsenstadion; Attendance: 35,000; Referee: (Denmark) Knud Erik Fisker

2 September (South Korea) (Japan) 2002 W.C. Q	Bosnia and Herzegovina	1–2	Spain	(Bosnia and Herzegovina) Sarajevo
20:15 CEST	Baljić 40'	Report	Gerard 38'; Etxeberria 71'	Stadium: Koševo Stadium; Attendance: 28,700; Referee: (Germany) Herbert Fandel

7 October (South Korea) (Japan) 2002 W.C. Q	Spain	2–0	Israel	(Spain) Madrid
21:30 CEST	Gerard 22'; Hierro 53'	Report		Stadium: Santiago Bernabéu; Attendance: 80,000; Referee: (France) Claude Colombo

11 October (South Korea) (Japan) 2002 W.C. Q	Austria	1–1	Spain	(Austria) Vienna
20:30 CEST	Baur 21'	Report	Baraja 26'	Stadium: Ernst-Happel-Stadion; Attendance: 48,000; Referee: (Russia) Valentin Ivanov

15 November Friendly	Spain	1–2	Netherlands	(Spain) Seville
21:30 CET	Hierro 65'	Report	Hasselbaink 74'; F. de Boer 83'	Stadium: Olímpico de La Cartuja; Attendance: 30,000; Referee: (Italy) Domenico Messina

=== 2001 ===
28 February Friendly	England	3–0	Spain	(England) Birmingham
20:00 GMT	Barmby 38'; Heskey 54'; Ehiogu 70'	Report		Stadium: Villa Park; Attendance: 41,129; Referee: (Greece) Kyros Vasaras

24 March (South Korea) (Japan) 2002 W.C. Q	Spain	5–0	Liechtenstein	(Spain) Alicante
21:30 CET	Helguera 19'; Mendieta 36', 81'; Hierro 54' (pen.); Raúl 67'	Report		Stadium: Rico Pérez; Attendance: 30,000; Referee: (Slovenia) Darko Čeferin

28 March Friendly	Spain	2–1	France	(Spain) Valencia
21:30 CEST	Helguera 38'; Morientes 47'	Report	Trezeguet 84'	Stadium: Mestalla; Attendance: 35,500; Referee: (Germany) Lutz Fröhlich

25 April Friendly	Spain	1–0	Japan	(Spain) Córdoba
21:45 CEST	Baraja 90+2'	Report		Stadium: Nuevo Arcángel; Attendance: 14,000; Referee: (Federal Republic of Yugoslavia) Miroslav Radoman

2 June (South Korea) (Japan) 2002 W.C. Q	Spain	4–1	Bosnia and Herzegovina	(Spain) Oviedo
21:30 CEST	Hierro 26'; Moreno 77'; Raúl 89'; Tristán 90'	Report	Bešlija 41'	Stadium: Nuevo Carlos Tartiere; Attendance: 30,000; Referee: (Norway) Roy Helge Olsen

6 June (South Korea) (Japan) 2002 W.C. Q	Israel	1–1	Spain	(Israel) Ramat Gan
20:00 EEST	Revivo 4'	Report	Raúl 63'	Stadium: Ramat Gan; Attendance: 23,000; Referee: (Sweden) Anders Frisk

1 September (South Korea) (Japan) 2002 W.C. Q	Spain	4–0	Austria	(Spain) Valencia
22:00 CEST	Tristán 45'; Morientes 79', 84'; Mendieta 90+2'	Report		Stadium: Mestalla; Attendance: 31,661; Referee: (Argentina) Horacio Elizondo

5 September (South Korea) (Japan) 2002 W.C. Q	Liechtenstein	0–2	Spain	(Liechtenstein) Vaduz
20:30 CEST		Report	Raúl 18'; Nadal 82'	Stadium: Rheinpark Stadion; Attendance: 4,648; Referee: (Bulgaria) Ivan Dobrinov

14 November Friendly	Spain	1–0	Mexico	(Spain) Huelva
21:30 CET	Raúl 72'	Report		Stadium: Nuevo Colombino; Attendance: 20,000; Referee: (Italy) Domenico Messina

=== 2002 ===
13 February Friendly	Spain	1–1	Portugal	(Spain) Barcelona
21:45 CET	Morientes 41'	Report	Costa 29'	Stadium: Olímpic Lluís Companys; Attendance: 48,200; Referee: (Romania) Alexandru Tudor

27 March Friendly	Netherlands	1–0	Spain	(Netherlands) Rotterdam
20:30 CET	F. de Boer 31'	Report		Stadium: De Kuip; Attendance: 25,500; Referee: (Sweden) Karl-Erik Nilsson

17 April Friendly	Northern Ireland	0–5	Spain	(Northern Ireland) Belfast
20:00 BST		Report	Raúl 24', 53'; Baraja 48'; Puyol 68'; Morientes 77'	Stadium: Windsor Park; Attendance: 13,000; Referee: (Scotland) Kenny Clark

2 June (South Korea) (Japan) 2002 W.C. GS	Spain	3–1	Slovenia	(South Korea) Gwangju
11:00 CEST; 18:00 Local time	Raúl 43'; Valerón 73'; Hierro 86' (pen.)	Report	Cimirotič 82'	Stadium: World Cup Stadium; Attendance: 28,598; Referee: (Morocco) Mohammed Guezzaz

7 June (South Korea) (Japan) 2002 W.C. GS	Spain	3–1	Paraguay	(South Korea) Jeonju
11:00 CEST; 18:00 Local time	Morientes 53', 69'; Hierro 83' (pen.)	Report	Puyol 10' (o.g.)	Stadium: World Cup Stadium; Attendance: 24,000; Referee: (Egypt) Gamal Ghandour

12 June (South Korea) (Japan) 2002 W.C. GS	South Africa	2–3	Spain	(South Korea) Daejeon
13:30 CEST; 20:30 Local time	McCarthy 31'; Radebe 53'	Report	Raúl 4', 56'; Mendieta 45'	Stadium: World Cup Stadium; Attendance: 31,024; Referee: (Kuwait) Saad Mane

16 June (South Korea) (Japan) 2002 W.C. R16	Spain	1–1 (a.e.t.) (3–2 p)	Republic of Ireland	(South Korea) Suwon
13:30 CEST; 20:30 Local time	Morientes 7'	Report	Robbie Keane 89' (pen.)	Stadium: World Cup Stadium; Attendance: 38,926; Referee: (Sweden) Anders Frisk
	Penalties
	Hierro (penalty scored); Baraja (penalty scored); Juanfran (penalty missed); Valerón (penalty missed); Mendieta (penalty scored)		(penalty scored) Keane; (penalty missed) Holland; (penalty missed) Connolly; (penalty missed) Kilbane; (penalty scored) Finnan

22 June (South Korea) (Japan) 2002 W.C. QF	Spain	0–0 (a.e.t.) (3–5 p)	South Korea	(South Korea) Gwangju
8:30 CEST; 15:30 Local time		Report		Stadium: World Cup Stadium; Attendance: 42,114; Referee: (Egypt) Gamal Al-Ghandour
	Penalties
	Hierro (penalty scored); Baraja (penalty scored); Xavi (penalty scored); Joaquín (penalty missed)		(penalty scored) Hwang Sun-hong; (penalty scored) Park Ji-sung; (penalty scored) Seol Ki-hyeon; (penalty scored) Ahn Jung-hwan; (penalty scored) Hong Myung-bo

21 August Friendly	Hungary	1–1	Spain	(Hungary) Budapest
20:30 CEST	Miriuță 72'	Report	Tamudo 54'	Stadium: Ferenc Puskás; Attendance: 20,000; Referee: (Germany) Helmut Fleischer

7 September (Portugal) 2004 EURO Q	Greece	0–2	Spain	(Greece) Athens
21:45 EEST		Report	Raúl 8'; Valerón 76'	Stadium: Leoforos Alexandras Stadium; Attendance: 17,000; Referee: (Germany) Markus Merk

12 October (Portugal) 2004 EURO Q	Spain	3–0	Northern Ireland	(Spain) Albacete
21:45 CEST	Baraja 18', 88'; Guti 60'	Report		Stadium: Carlos Belmonte; Attendance: 16,000; Referee: (Slovakia) Ľuboš Micheľ

16 October Friendly	Spain	0–0	Paraguay	(Spain) Logroño
21:45 CEST		Report		Stadium: Nuevo Las Gaunas; Attendance: 15,000; Referee: (Portugal) Olegário Benquerença

20 November Friendly	Spain	1–0	Bulgaria	(Spain) Granada
21:45 CET	José Mari 10'	Report		Stadium: Nuevo Los Cármenes; Attendance: 16,000; Referee: (France) Bruno Coué

=== 2003 ===
12 February Friendly	Spain	3–1	Germany	(Spain) Palma de Mallorca
21:30 CET	Raúl 31', 76' (pen.); Guti 83'	Report	Bobic 38'	Stadium: Son Moix; Attendance: 20,000; Referee: (England) Mike Riley

29 March (Portugal) 2004 EURO Q	Ukraine	2–2	Spain	(Ukraine) Kyiv
20:00 EET	Voronin 11'; Horshkov 90+2'	Report	Raúl 83'; Etxeberria 87'	Stadium: Olimpiysky NSC; Attendance: 82,000; Referee: (England) Mike Riley

2 April (Portugal) 2004 EURO Q	Spain	3–0	Armenia	(Spain) León
21:45 CEST	Tristán 62'; Helguera 68'; Joaquín 90+2'			Stadium: Antonio Amilivia; Attendance: 13,500; Referee: (Israel) Alon Yefet

30 April Friendly	Spain	4–0	Ecuador	(Spain) Madrid
21:45 CEST	De Pedro 15'; Morientes 20', 22', 64'	Report		Stadium: Vicente Calderón; Attendance: 40,000; Referee: (Georgia (country)) Sergo Kvaratskhelia

7 June (Portugal) 2004 EURO Q	Spain	0–1	Greece	(Spain) Zaragoza
21:45 CEST		Report	Giannakopoulos 43'	Stadium: La Romareda; Attendance: 32,000; Referee: (France) Alain Sars

11 June (Portugal) 2004 EURO Q	Northern Ireland	0–0	Spain	(Northern Ireland) Belfast
20:00 BST		Report		Stadium: Windsor Park; Attendance: 11,365; Referee: (Denmark) Claus Bo Larsen

6 September Friendly	Portugal	0–3	Spain	(Portugal) Guimarães
21:15 CEST		Report	Etxeberria 11'; Joaquín 64'; Tristán 77'	Stadium: Alfonso Henriques; Attendance: 21,176; Referee: (Romania) Mircea Salomir

10 September (Portugal) 2004 EURO Q	Spain	2–1	Ukraine	(Spain) Elche
21:45 CEST	Raúl 59', 71'	Report	Shevchenko 84'	Stadium: Estadio Martínez Valero; Attendance: 39,000; Referee: (Norway) Terje Hauge

11 October (Portugal) 2004 EURO Q	Armenia	0–4	Spain	(Armenia) Yerevan
21:00 Local time		Report	Valerón 7'; Raúl 75'; Reyes 86', 90'	Stadium: Hanrapetakan; Attendance: 16,000; Referee: (Switzerland) Urs Meier

15 November (Portugal) 2004 EURO RP	Spain	2–1	Norway	(Spain) Valencia
22:00 CET	Raúl 20'; Berg 84' (o.g.)	Report	14' Iversen	Stadium: Mestalla; Attendance: 53,000; Referee: (England) Graham Poll

19 November (Portugal) 2004 EURO RP	Norway	0–3 (1–5 agg.)	Spain	(Norway) Oslo
19:30 CET		Report	33' Raúl; 48' Vicente; 55' Etxeberria	Stadium: Ullevaal; Attendance: 25,100; Referee: (Italy) Pierluigi Collina

=== 2004 ===
18 February Friendly	Spain	2–1	Peru	(Spain) Barcelona
21:45 CET	Etxeberria 31'; Baraja 31'	Report	22' Solano	Stadium: Olímpic Lluís Companys; Attendance: 23,580; Referee: (France) Bertrand Layec

31 March Friendly	Spain	2–0	Denmark	(Spain) Gijón
21:45 CEST	Morientes 22'; Raúl 60'	Report		Stadium: El Molinón; Attendance: 18,600; Referee: (Portugal) António Manuel Almeida Costa

28 April Friendly	Italy	1–1	Spain	(Italy) Genoa
21:00 CEST	Vieri 55'	Report	52' Torres	Stadium: Luigi Ferraris; Attendance: 30,000; Referee: (England) Graham Poll

5 June Friendly	Spain	4–0	Andorra	(Spain) Getafe (Madrid)
22:00 CEST	Morientes 24'; Baraja 45'; César 64'; Valerón 89'	Report		Stadium: Coliséum Alfonso Pérez; Attendance: 14,000; Referee: (Italy) Matteo Trefolini

12 June (Portugal) 2004 EURO GS	Spain	1–0	Russia	(Portugal) Faro
20:45 CEST; 19:45 Local time	Valerón 60'	Report		Stadium: Estádio do Algarve; Attendance: 28,182; Referee: (Switzerland) Urs Meier

16 June (Portugal) 2004 EURO GS	Greece	1–1	Spain	(Portugal) Porto
18:00 CEST; 17:00 Local time	Charisteas 66'	Report	28' Morientes	Stadium: Estádio do Bessa Século XXI; Attendance: 25,444; Referee: (Slovakia) Ľuboš Micheľ

20 June (Portugal) 2004 EURO GS	Spain	0–1	Portugal	(Portugal) Lisbon
20:45 CEST; 19:45 Local time		Report	57' Nuno Gomes	Stadium: José Alvalade; Attendance: 47,491; Referee: (Sweden) Anders Frisk

18 August Friendly	Spain	3–2	Venezuela	(Spain) Las Palmas de Gran Canaria
21:00 WEST	Morientes 41'; Tamudo 57', 67'	Report	45+1' Rojas; 90+2' Castellín	Stadium: Gran Canaria; Attendance: 31,000; Referee: (Italy) Pasquale Rodomonti

3 September Friendly	Spain	1–1	Scotland	(Spain) Valencia
22:00 CEST	Raúl 56' (pen.)	Report	17' (o.g.) Baraja	Stadium: Ciutat de València; Attendance: 15,000; Referee: (France) Stéphane Bré

8 September (Germany) 2006 W.C. Q	Bosnia and Herzegovina	1–1	Spain	(Bosnia and Herzegovina) Zenica
20:15 CEST	Bolić 79'	Report	65' Vicente	Stadium: Bilino Polje; Attendance: 14,380; Referee: (Italy) Massimo De Santis

9 October (Germany) 2006 W.C. Q	Spain	2–0	Belgium	(Spain) Santander
21:45 CEST	Luque 60'; Raúl 65'	Report		Stadium: El Sardinero; Attendance: 17,000; Referee: (Denmark) Kim Milton Nielsen

13 October (Germany) 2006 W.C. Q	Lithuania	0–0	Spain	(Lithuania) Vilnius
21:15 EEST		Report		Stadium: Žalgiris; Attendance: 9,114; Referee: (France) Éric Poulat

17 November Friendly	Spain	1–0	England	(Spain) Madrid
21:45 CET	Del Horno 9'	Report		Stadium: Santiago Bernabéu; Attendance: 48,000; Referee: (Greece) Giorgos Kasnaferis

=== 2005 ===
9 February (Germany) 2006 W.C. Q	Spain	5–0	San Marino	(Spain) Almería
21:45 CET	Joaquín 15'; Torres 32'; Raúl 42'; Guti 61'; Del Horno 75'	Report		Stadium: Juegos del Mediterráneo; Attendance: 12,580; Referee: (Scotland) Kenny Clark

26 March Friendly	Spain	3–0	China	(Spain) Villares de la Reina
21:45 CET	Torres 2' (pen.); Xavi 31'; Joaquín 52'	Report		Stadium: El Helmántico; Attendance: 17,341; Referee: (Portugal) Lucílio Batista

30 March (Germany) 2006 W.C. Q	Serbia and Montenegro	0–0	Spain	(Serbia and Montenegro) Belgrade
21:00 CEST		Report		Stadium: Crvena Zvezda; Attendance: 48,910; Referee: (Italy) Massimo Busacca

4 June (Germany) 2006 W.C. Q	Spain	1–0	Lithuania	(Spain) Valencia
21:30 CEST	Luque 68'	Report		Stadium: Mestalla; Attendance: 25,000; Referee: (Italy) Stefano Farina

8 June (Germany) 2006 W.C. Q	Spain	1–1	Bosnia and Herzegovina	(Spain) Valencia
22:00 CEST	Marchena 90+6'	Report	39' Misimović	Stadium: Mestalla; Attendance: 38,041; Referee: (England) Steve Bennett

17 August Friendly	Spain	2–0	Uruguay	(Spain) Gijón
22:00 CEST	García 25' (o.g.); Vicente 38' (pen.)	Report		Stadium: El Molinón; Attendance: 23,348; Referee: (Portugal) Olegário Benquerença

3 September Friendly	Spain	2–1	Canada	(Spain) Santander
21:45 CEST	Tamudo 7'; Morientes 69'	Report	73' Grande	Stadium: El Sardinero; Attendance: 11,978; Referee: (France) Claude Colombo

7 September (Germany) 2006 W.C. Q	Spain	1–1	Serbia and Montenegro	(Spain) Madrid
22:00 CEST	Raúl 19'	Report	69' Kežman	Stadium: Vicente Calderón; Attendance: 51,491; Referee: (England) Graham Poll

8 October (Germany) 2006 W.C. Q	Belgium	0–2	Spain	(Belgium) Brussels
20:45 CEST		Report	56', 66' Torres	Stadium: King Baudouin; Attendance: 40,300; Referee: (Slovakia) Ľuboš Micheľ

12 October (Germany) 2006 W.C. Q	San Marino	0–6	Spain	(San Marino) Serravalle
20:30 CEST		Report	1' López; 11', 78', 89' (pen.) Torres; 31', 48' Ramos	Stadium: Stadio Olimpico; Attendance: 3,426; Referee: (Germany) Florian Meyer

12 November (Germany) 2006 W.C. RP	Spain	5–1	Slovakia	(Spain) Madrid
22:00 CET	García 10', 18', 74'; Torres 65' (pen.); Morientes 79'	Report	49' Németh	Stadium: Vicente Calderón; Attendance: 47,210; Referee: (Italy) Massimo De Santis

16 November (Germany) 2006 W.C. RP	Slovakia	1–1 (2–6 agg.)	Spain	(Slovakia) Bratislava
20:15 CET	Hološko 50'	Report	71' Villa	Stadium: Tehelné Pole; Attendance: 23,587; Referee: (Germany) Markus Merk

=== 2006 ===
1 March Friendly	Spain	3–2	Ivory Coast	(Spain) Valladolid
22:00 CET	Villa 23'; Reyes 72'; Juanito 85'	Report	13' Keïta; 46' Kalou	Stadium: Nuevo José Zorrilla; Attendance: 22,249; Referee: (Italy) Pasquale Rodomont

27 May Friendly	Spain	0–0	Russia	(Spain) Albacete
22:00 CEST		Report		Stadium: Carlos Belmonte; Attendance: 18,000; Referee: (Portugal) João Francisco Lopes Ferreira

3 June Friendly	Spain	2–0	Egypt	(Spain) Elche
22:00 CEST	Raúl 14'; Reyes 57'	Report		Stadium: Estadio Martínez Valero; Attendance: 38,000; Referee: (Italy) Stefano Farina

7 June Friendly	Croatia	1–2	Spain	(Switzerland) Lancy (Geneva)
21:00 CEST	Ibáñez 14' (o.g.)	Report	62' Pernía; 90+2' Torres	Stadium: Stade de Genève; Attendance: 15,000; Referee: (France) Stéphane Lannoy

14 June (Germany) 2006 W.C. GS	Spain	4–0	Ukraine	(Germany) Leipzig
15:00 CEST	Alonso 13'; Villa 17', 48' (pen.); Torres 81'	Report		Stadium: Zentralstadion; Attendance: 43,000; Referee: (Switzerland) Massimo Busacca

19 June (Germany) 2006 W.C. GS	Spain	3–1	Tunisia	(Germany) Stuttgart
21:00 CEST	Raúl 71'; Torres 76', 90+1' (pen.)	Report	8' Mnari	Stadium: Gottlieb-Daimler-Stadion; Attendance: 52,000; Referee: (Brazil) Carlos Eugênio Simon

23 June (Germany) 2006 W.C. GS	Saudi Arabia	0–1	Spain	(Germany) Kaiserslautern
16:00 CEST		Report	36' Juanito	Stadium: Fritz Walter Stadion; Attendance: 46,000; Referee: (Benin) Coffi Codjia

27 June (Germany) 2006 W.C. R16	Spain	1–3	France	(Germany) Hanover
21:00 CEST	Villa 28' (pen.)	Report	41' Ribéry; 83' Vieira; 90+2' Zidane	Stadium: AWD-Arena; Attendance: 43,000; Referee: (Italy) Roberto Rosetti

15 August Friendly	Iceland	0–0	Spain	(Iceland) Reykjavík
20:00 GMT		Report		Stadium: Laugardalsvöllur; Attendance: 12,327; Referee: (Republic of Ireland) Ian Stokes

2 September (Austria) (Switzerland) 2008 EURO Q	Spain	4–0	Liechtenstein	(Spain) Badajoz
22:00 CEST	Torres 20'; Villa 45', 62'; García 66'	Report		Stadium: Nuevo Vivero; Attendance: 13,876; Referee: (North Macedonia) Ljubomir Krstevski

6 September (Austria) (Switzerland) 2008 EURO Q	Northern Ireland	3–2	Spain	(Northern Ireland) Belfast
21:15 CEST	Healy 20', 65', 80'	Report	14' Xavi; 52' Villa	Stadium: Windsor Park; Attendance: 13,885; Referee: (Belgium) Frank De Bleeckere

7 October (Austria) (Switzerland) 2008 EURO Q	Sweden	2–0	Spain	(Sweden) Solna
20:00 CEST	Elmander 10'; Allbäck 82'	Report		Stadium: Råsunda; Attendance: 33,056; Referee: (England) Steve Bennett

11 October Friendly	Spain	2–1	Argentina	(Spain) Murcia
22:00 CET	Xavi 34'; Villa 62' (pen.)	Report	35' Bilos	Stadium: Nueva Condomina; Attendance: 32,500; Referee: (France) Laurent Duhamel

15 November Friendly	Spain	0–1	Romania	(Spain) Cádiz
22:00 CET		Report	59' Marica	Stadium: Ramón de Carranza; Attendance: 16,000; Referee: (Italy) Domenico Messina

=== 2007 ===
7 February Friendly	England	0–1	Spain	(England) Manchester
20:00 GMT		Report	62' Iniesta	Stadium: Old Trafford; Attendance: 58,207; Referee: (Germany) Michael Weiner

24 March (Austria) (Switzerland) 2008 EURO Q	Spain	2–1	Denmark	(Spain) Madrid
22:00 CET	Morientes 34'; Villa 45+1'	Report	49' Gravgaard	Stadium: Santiago Bernabéu; Attendance: 73,575; Referee: (Switzerland) Massimo Busacca

28 March (Austria) (Switzerland) 2008 EURO Q	Spain	1–0	Iceland	(Spain) Palma de Mallorca
22:00 CEST	Iniesta 80'	Report		Stadium: ONO Estadi; Attendance: 18,326; Referee: (France) Laurent Duhamel

2 June (Austria) (Switzerland) 2008 EURO Q	Latvia	0–2	Spain	(Latvia) Riga
20:30 CEST		Report	45' Villa; 60' Xavi	Stadium: Skonto Stadions; Attendance: 10,000; Referee: (Scotland) Craig Thomson

6 June (Austria) (Switzerland) 2008 EURO Q	Liechtenstein	0–2	Spain	(Liechtenstein) Vaduz
20:30 CEST		Report	8', 14' Villa	Stadium: Rheinpark; Attendance: 5,739; Referee: (Russia) Nikolai Ivanov

22 August Friendly	Greece	2–3	Spain	(Greece) Thessaloniki
21:30 EEST	Gekas 19'; Katsouranis 44'	Report	37' Marchena; 66', 90+2' Silva	Stadium: Toumba; Attendance: 13,000; Referee: (France) Stéphane Lannoy

8 September (Austria) (Switzerland) 2008 EURO Q	Iceland	1–1	Spain	(Iceland) Reykjavík
21:00 CEST	Hallfreðsson 40'	Report	86' Iniesta	Stadium: Laugardalsvöllur; Attendance: 9,483; Referee: (Germany) Wolfgang Stark

12 September (Austria) (Switzerland) 2008 EURO Q	Spain	2–0	Latvia	(Spain) Oviedo
22:00 CEST	Xavi 13'; Torres 86'	Report		Stadium: Nuevo Carlos Tartiere; Attendance: 22,560; Referee: (Israel) Alon Yefet

13 October (Austria) (Switzerland) 2008 EURO Q	Denmark	1–3	Spain	(Denmark) Aarhus
20:00 CEST	Tomasson 87'	Report	14' Tamudo; 40' Ramos; 89' Riera	Stadium: NRGi Park; Attendance: 19,849; Referee: (Slovakia) Ľuboš Micheľ

17 October Friendly	Finland	0–0	Spain	(Finland) Helsinki
20:30 EEST		Report		Stadium: Helsingin Olympiastadion; Attendance: 11,751; Referee: (France) Stéphane Bré

17 November (Austria) (Switzerland) 2008 EURO Q	Spain	3–0	Sweden	(Spain) Madrid
22:00 CET	Capdevila 14'; Iniesta 39'; Ramos 65'	Report		Stadium: Santiago Bernabéu; Attendance: 67,055; Referee: (Italy) Roberto Rosetti

21 November (Austria) (Switzerland) 2008 EURO Q	Spain	1–0	Northern Ireland	(Spain) Las Palmas de Gran Canaria
20:00 CET; 19:00 Local time	Xavi 52'	Report		Stadium: Gran Canaria; Attendance: 30,339; Referee: (Germany) Herbert Fandel

=== 2008 ===
6 February Friendly	Spain	1–0	France	(Spain) Málaga
21:00 CET	Capdevila 80'	Report		Stadium: La Rosaleda; Attendance: 29,000; Referee: (Finland) Tony Asumaa

26 March Friendly	Spain	1–0	Italy	(Spain) Elche
22:00 CET	Villa 77'	Report		Stadium: Estadio Martínez Valero; Attendance: 38,000; Referee: (Austria) Fritz Stuchlik

31 May Friendly	Spain	2–1	Peru	(Spain) Huelva
22:00 CEST	Villa 37'; Capdevila 90+2'	Report	Rengifo 74'	Stadium: Nuevo Colombino; Attendance: 17,500; Referee: (North Macedonia) Dimitar Meckarovski

4 June Friendly	Spain	1–0	United States	(Spain) Santander
22:00 CEST	Xavi 79'	Report		Stadium: El Sardinero; Attendance: 14,232; Referee: (Albania) Sokol Jareci

==== UEFA Euro 2008 ====
10 June (Austria) (Switzerland) 2008 EURO GS	Spain	4–1	Russia	(Austria) Innsbruck
18:00 CEST	Villa 20', 44', 75'; Fàbregas 90+1'	Report	Pavlyuchenko 86'	Stadium: Tivoli Neu; Attendance: 30,772; Referee: (Austria) Konrad Plautz

14 June (Austria) (Switzerland) 2008 EURO GS	Sweden	1–2	Spain	(Austria) Innsbruck
18:00 CEST	Ibrahimović 34'	Report	Torres 15'; Villa 90+2'	Stadium: Tivoli Neu; Attendance: 30,772; Referee: (Netherlands) Pieter Vink

18 June (Austria) (Switzerland) 2008 EURO GS	Greece	1–2	Spain	(Austria) Salzburg
20:45 CEST	Charisteas 42'	Report	De la Red 61'; Güiza 88'	Stadium: Wals Siezenheim; Attendance: 30,883; Referee: (England) Howard Webb

22 June (Austria) (Switzerland) 2008 EURO QF	Spain	0–0 (a.e.t.) (4–2 p)	Italy	(Austria) Vienna
20:45 CEST	Iniesta (yellow card) 11'; Villa (yellow card) 72'; Cazorla (yellow card) 113'	Report	Ambrosini (yellow card) 31'	Stadium: Ernst-Happel-Stadion; Attendance: 48,000; Referee: (Germany) Herbert Fandel
	Penalties
	Villa (penalty scored); Cazorla (penalty scored); Senna (penalty scored); Güiza (penalty missed); Fàbregas (penalty scored)		(penalty scored) Grosso; (penalty missed) De Rossi; (penalty scored) Camoranesi; (penalty missed) Di Natale

26 June (Austria) (Switzerland) 2008 EURO SF	Russia	0–3	Spain	(Austria) Vienna
20:45 CEST	Zhirkov (yellow card) 56'; Bilyaletdinov (yellow card) 60'	Report	Xavi 50'; Güiza 73'; Silva 82'	Stadium: Ernst-Happel-Stadion; Attendance: 51,428; Referee: (Belgium) Frank De Bleeckere

29 June (Austria) (Switzerland) 2008 EURO F	Germany	0–1	Spain	(Austria) Vienna
20:45 CEST	Ballack (yellow card) 43'; Kurányi (yellow card) 88'	Report	F. Torres 33', (yellow card) 74'; Casillas (yellow card) 43'	Stadium: Ernst-Happel; Attendance: 51,428; Referee: (Italy) Roberto Rosetti

20 August Friendly	Denmark	0–3	Spain	(Denmark) Copenhagen
20:15 CEST		Report	Alonso 50', 90'; Xavi 74'	Stadium: Parken; Attendance: 26,155; Referee: (Sweden) Martin Hansson

6 September (South Africa) 2010 W.C. Q	Spain	1–0	Bosnia and Herzegovina	(Spain) Murcia
22:00 CEST	Villa 57'	Report		Stadium: Nueva Condomina; Attendance: 29,152; Referee: (Scotland) Craig Thomson

10 September (South Africa) 2010 W.C. Q	Spain	4–0	Armenia	(Spain) Albacete
22:00 CEST	Capdevila 7'; Villa 16', 79'; Senna 83'	Report		Stadium: Carlos Belmonte; Attendance: 16,996; Referee: (Finland) Tony Asumaa

11 October (South Africa) 2010 W.C. Q	Estonia	0–3	Spain	(Estonia) Tallinn
20:45 CEST		Report	Juanito 34'; Villa 38'; Puyol 69'	Stadium: A. Le Coq Arena; Attendance: 9,200; Referee: (Sweden) Jonas Eriksson

15 October (South Africa) 2010 W.C. Q	Belgium	1–2	Spain	(Belgium) Brussels
20:45 CEST	Sonck 7'	Report	Iniesta 36'; Villa 88'	Stadium: King Baudouin; Attendance: 45,888; Referee: (Norway) Tom Henning Øvrebø

19 November Friendly	Spain	3–0	Chile	(Spain) Villarreal (Castellón)
22:00 CET	Villa 36' (pen.); Torres 66'; Cazorla 85'	Report		Stadium: El Madrigal; Attendance: 15,000; Referee: (Georgia (country)) George Vadachkoria

=== 2009 ===
11 February Friendly	Spain	2–0	England	(Spain) Seville
22:00 CET	Villa 36'; Llorente 82'	Report		Stadium: Ramón Sánchez Pizjuán; Attendance: 42,102; Referee: (France) Stéphane Lannoy

28 March (South Africa) 2010 W.C. Q	Spain	1–0	Turkey	(Spain) Madrid
22:00 CET	Piqué 60'	Report		Stadium: Santiago Bernabéu; Attendance: 73,820; Referee: (Switzerland) Massimo Busacca

1 April (South Africa) 2010 W.C. Q	Turkey	1–2	Spain	(Turkey) Istanbul
20:00 CEST	Şentürk 26'	Report	Alonso 63' (pen.); Riera 90+2'	Stadium: Ali Sami Yen; Attendance: 19,617; Referee: (England) Mike Riley

9 June Friendly	Azerbaijan	0–6	Spain	(Azerbaijan) Baku
18:00 CEST		Report	Villa 34', 38', 45' (pen.); Riera 67'; Güiza 70'; Torres 87'	Stadium: Tofik Bakhramov; Attendance: 29,000; Referee: (Ukraine) Ihor Ishchenko

14 June (South Africa) 2009 C.C. GS	New Zealand	0–5	Spain	(South Africa) Rustenburg
20:30 CEST		Report	Torres 6', 14', 17'; Fàbregas 24'; Villa 48'	Stadium: Royal Bafokeng Stadium; Attendance: 21,649; Referee: (Benin) Coffi Codjia

17 June (South Africa) 2009 C.C. GS	Spain	1–0	Iraq	(South Africa) Bloemfontein
16:00 CEST	Villa 55'	Report		Stadium: Free State Stadium; Attendance: 30,512; Referee: (Australia) Matthew Breeze

20 June (South Africa) 2009 C.C. GS	Spain	2–0	South Africa	(South Africa) Bloemfontein
20:30 CEST	Villa 52'; Llorente 72'	Report		Stadium: Free State Stadium; Attendance: 38,212; Referee: (Chile) Pablo Pozo

24 June (South Africa) 2009 C.C. SF	Spain	0–2	United States	(South Africa) Bloemfontein
20:30 CEST		Report	Altidore 27'; Dempsey 74'	Stadium: Free State Stadium; Attendance: 35,369; Referee: (Uruguay) Jorge Larrionda

28 June (South Africa) 2009 C.C. 3rd PO	Spain	3–2 (a.e.t.)	South Africa	(South Africa) Rustenburg
15:00 CEST	Güiza 88', 89'; Alonso 107'	Report	Mphela 73', 90+3'	Stadium: Royal Bafokeng Stadium; Attendance: 31,788; Referee: (Australia) Matthew Breeze

12 August Friendly	North Macedonia	2–3	Spain	(North Macedonia) Skopje
21:30 CEST	Pandev 8', 33'	Report	Torres 50'; Piqué 54'; Riera 55'	Stadium: Philip II Arena; Attendance: 25,000; Referee: (Netherlands) Pieter Vink

5 September (South Africa) 2010 W.C. Q	Spain	5–0	Belgium	(Spain) A Coruña
22:00 CEST	Silva 41', 68'; Villa 49', 85'; Piqué 50'	Report		Stadium: Riazor; Attendance: 30,441; Referee: (France) Bertrand Layec

9 September (South Africa) 2010 W.C. Q	Spain	3–0	Estonia	(Spain) Mérida
22:00 CEST	Fàbregas 32'; Cazorla 81'; Mata 90+2'	Report		Stadium: Romano; Attendance: 14,362; Referee: (Ukraine) Oleh Oriekhov

10 October (South Africa) 2010 W.C. Q	Armenia	1–2	Spain	(Armenia) Yerevan
18:00 CEST	Arzumanyan 58'	Report	Fàbregas 33'; Mata 64' (pen.)	Stadium: Hanrapetakan Stadium; Attendance: 10,500; Referee: (Czech Republic) Jiří Jech

14 October (South Africa) 2010 W.C. Q	Bosnia and Herzegovina	2–5	Spain	(Bosnia and Herzegovina) Zenica
20:00 CEST	Džeko 90'; Misimović 90+2'	Report	Piqué 12'; Silva 15'; Negredo 50', 55'; Mata 89'	Stadium: Bilino Polje; Attendance: 13,500; Referee: (Austria) Konrad Plautz

14 November Friendly	Spain	2–1	Argentina	(Spain) Madrid
20:45 CET	Alonso 16', 86' (pen.)	Report	Messi 61' (pen.)	Stadium: Vicente Calderón; Attendance: 54,000; Referee: (Republic of Ireland) Alan Kelly

18 November Friendly	Austria	1–5	Spain	(Austria) Vienna
20:45 CET	Jantscher 8'	Report	Fàbregas 10'; Villa 20', 45'; Güiza 56'; Hernández 57'	Stadium: Ernst-Happel-Stadion; Attendance: 32,000; Referee: (Germany) Florian Meyer
