= 2009 FIFA Confederations Cup final =

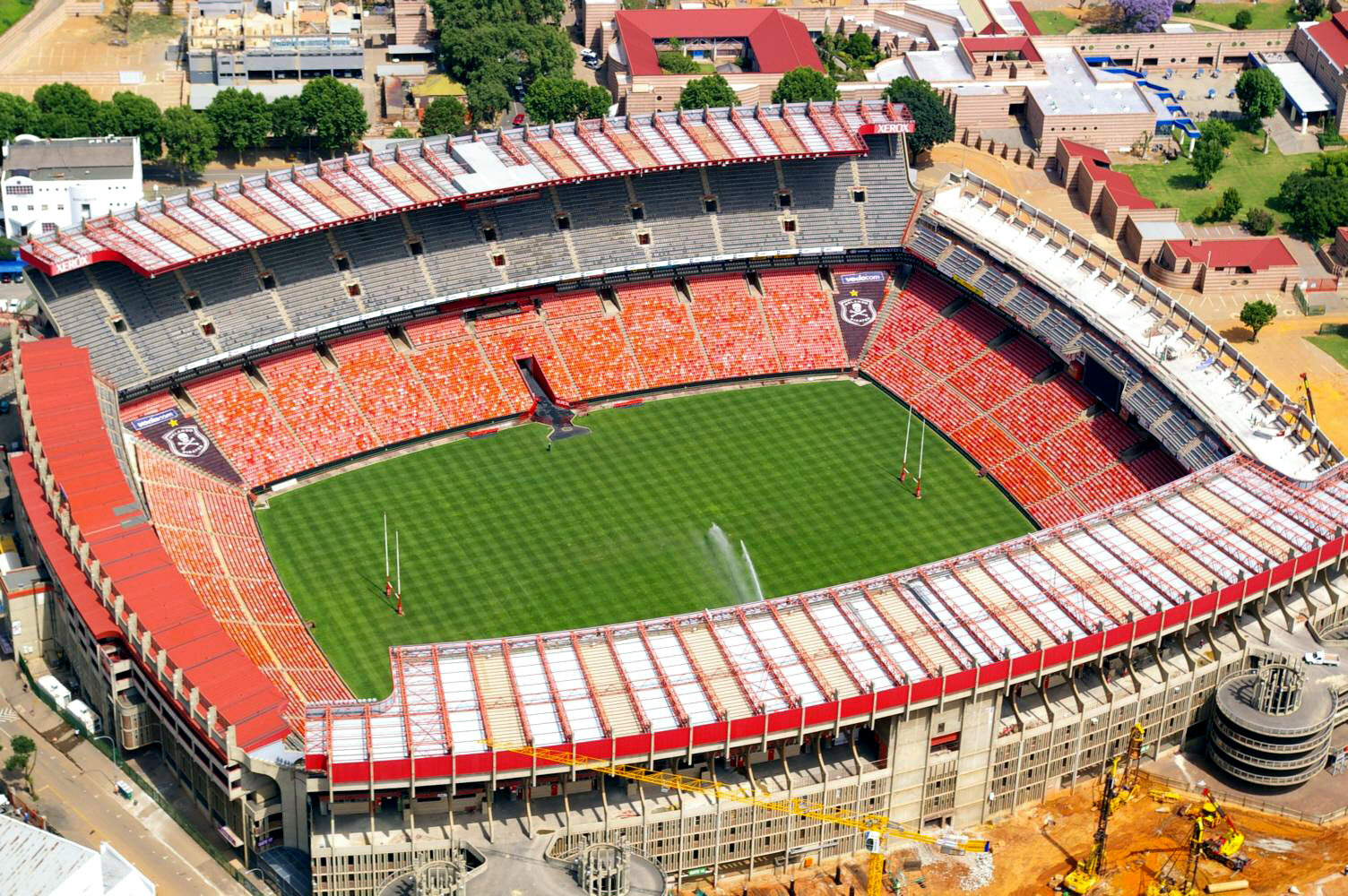
- Ellis Park Stadium, the venue for the final
- Event: 2009 FIFA Confederations Cup
United States	Brazil
(United States)	(Brazil)
2	3
- Date: 28 June 2009
- Venue: Ellis Park Stadium, Johannesburg, South Africa
- Man of the Match: Kaká (Brazil)
- Referee: Martin Hansson (Sweden)
- Attendance: 52,291
- Weather: Clear; 10 °C (50 °F); 26% humidity

The 2009 FIFA Confederations Cup final was an association football match that took place on 28 June 2009 to determine the winners of the 2009 FIFA Confederations Cup. It was played at Ellis Park Stadium in Johannesburg, South Africa, and was contested by the United States and Brazil. The United States, playing in their first major men's tournament final, took a 2–0 lead in the first half, but Brazil scored three unanswered goals after half-time to win 3–2.

The United States and Brazil qualified for the tournament as winners of their respective continents in 2007 and were drawn into Group B alongside African champions Egypt and reigning World Cup champions Italy. Brazil comfortably qualified for the knockout round by winning all three of their matches, including a 3–0 victory over the United States, while the Americans finished second in the group on the goals scored tiebreaker ahead of Italy. The United States upset European champions Spain in the semi-finals with a 2–0 victory, while Brazil defeated hosts South Africa 1–0 in the other semi-final fixture.

The match drew a television audience of 3.9 million viewers in the United States, surpassing the record for a non-World Cup fixture. The U.S. team would go on to play in the 2009 CONCACAF Gold Cup, where they were given a special exemption to roster size limits to prevent player fatigue, and reached the tournament's final before losing to Mexico. Both finalists made it to the knockout stage of the 2010 FIFA World Cup, but Brazil were eliminated in the quarter-finals and the United States exited in the Round of 16. Brazil went on to win the next edition of the Confederations Cup, which it hosted.

== Route to the final ==
The FIFA Confederations Cup was a quadrennial international competition between eight men's national teams who had won the respective championships of the six continental confederations, along with the host country and the reigning FIFA World Cup champion. The finalists of the 2009 Confederations Cup, the United States and Brazil, had previously met thirteen times, including at the Confederations Cup group stage in 1999 and 2003 and in the knockout stage of the 1994 World Cup. Brazil won twelve of the fixtures, while the sole U.S. victory over Brazil came in the semi-finals of the 1998 CONCACAF Gold Cup, in which the American goalkeeper Kasey Keller made several saves to keep the score at 1–0.

The United States qualified for their fourth stint in the competition after winning the 2007 CONCACAF Gold Cup, while Brazil's victory in the 2007 Copa América granted them a sixth berth in the Confederations Cup. Brazil had also previously won the Confederations Cup on two occasions, in 1997 and 2005, while the United States were appearing in their first final in a senior men's competition outside of their home region. Both teams were drawn into Group B of the Confederations Cup, alongside African champions Egypt and reigning World Cup champions Italy.

=== Group stage ===
Brazil began their defence of the Confederations Cup title by playing Egypt in Bloemfontein. Kaká opened the scoring in the fifth minute with a series of controlled chips past three defenders, but Egypt's Mohamed Zidan scored an equaliser four minutes later on a header. Brazil regained and extended the lead by half-time through two headed goals by Luís Fabiano in the 11th minute, finishing a free kick taken by Elano, and by Juan in the 37th minute from a corner kick. Egyptian midfielder Mohamed Shawky scored from outside the box in the 54th minute and was followed a minute later by a second goal for Zidan, levelling the score at 3–3. The match remained tied until a handball in the box by substitute Ahmed Elmohamady led to a penalty kick, which was converted in the 90th minute by Kaká to win the match for Brazil.

The Americans played their first match against Italy and held the World Cup champions to a scoreless first half, despite a red card being shown to midfielder Ricardo Clark, who tackled Gennaro Gattuso in the 33rd minute. A challenge by Giorgio Chiellini on Jozy Altidore earned a penalty for the United States, which was scored by Landon Donovan in the 41st minute and gave them a half-time lead. The Italians equalised in the 58th minute through a 30-yard (27 m) strike by American-born striker Giuseppe Rossi, who had been substituted a minute before and stole possession from Benny Feilhaber in the midfield to set up the shot. The team then took the lead through another long-distance shot in the 72nd minute by Daniele De Rossi and finished their 3–1 victory with a second goal for Rossi in extra time following a chipped cross by Andrea Pirlo.

The eventual finalists faced each other at Loftus Versfeld Stadium in Pretoria on the second matchday, which ended in a 3–0 victory for Brazil. Maicon took a free kick from 35 yards (32 m) that found Felipe Melo, who headed it from the box to score the opening goal in the seventh minute. The lead was extended in the 20th minute after DaMarcus Beasley lost possession after a U.S. corner, which was dribbled upfield by Ramires and passed to Robinho, whose shot went past Tim Howard into the goal. U.S. midfielder Sacha Kljestan was sent off for a foul in the 57th minute and the team lost momentum that they had gained in the second half before conceding a final goal to Brazil five minutes later through a shot by Maicon from a narrow angle near the touchline. Although the U.S. lost their first two matches, they were still eligible to advance following an upset victory for Egypt over Italy that kept them from being mathematically eliminated.

Brazil finished their group stage run with a 3–0 defeat of Italy, denying the reigning World Cup champions a berth in the semi-finals by scoring three times in the first half. After several chances for Brazil that went wide of the goal, Luís Fabiano opened the scoring in the 37th minute after collecting a mis-hit shot by Maicon. Fabiano added a second goal six minutes later that was assisted by Kaká and dummied by Robinho, who created the third goal two minutes later by passing a ball into the Italian box on a counterattack, which was deflected into the goal by defender Andrea Dossena. The Italians failed to score a consolation goal in the second half, which doomed them to fall short of the United States on goal difference and goals scored in the tie-breakers for runners-up in Group B.

In their final group stage match against Egypt, the United States took the lead in the 21st minute following a mistake by goalkeeper Essam Al Hadary that allowed Charlie Davies to score from the loose ball in the box. Midfielder Michael Bradley then scored in the 63rd minute following a series of give-and-go passes with Landon Donovan, and Clint Dempsey added a third by heading in a cross from Jonathan Spector in the 71st minute. With their 3–0 victory, the United States were tied on three points with Italy and Egypt and tied the former with a goal difference of −2. The United States were able to advance on the second tie-breaker (goals scored), having scored four goals to Italy's three.

=== Semi-finals ===
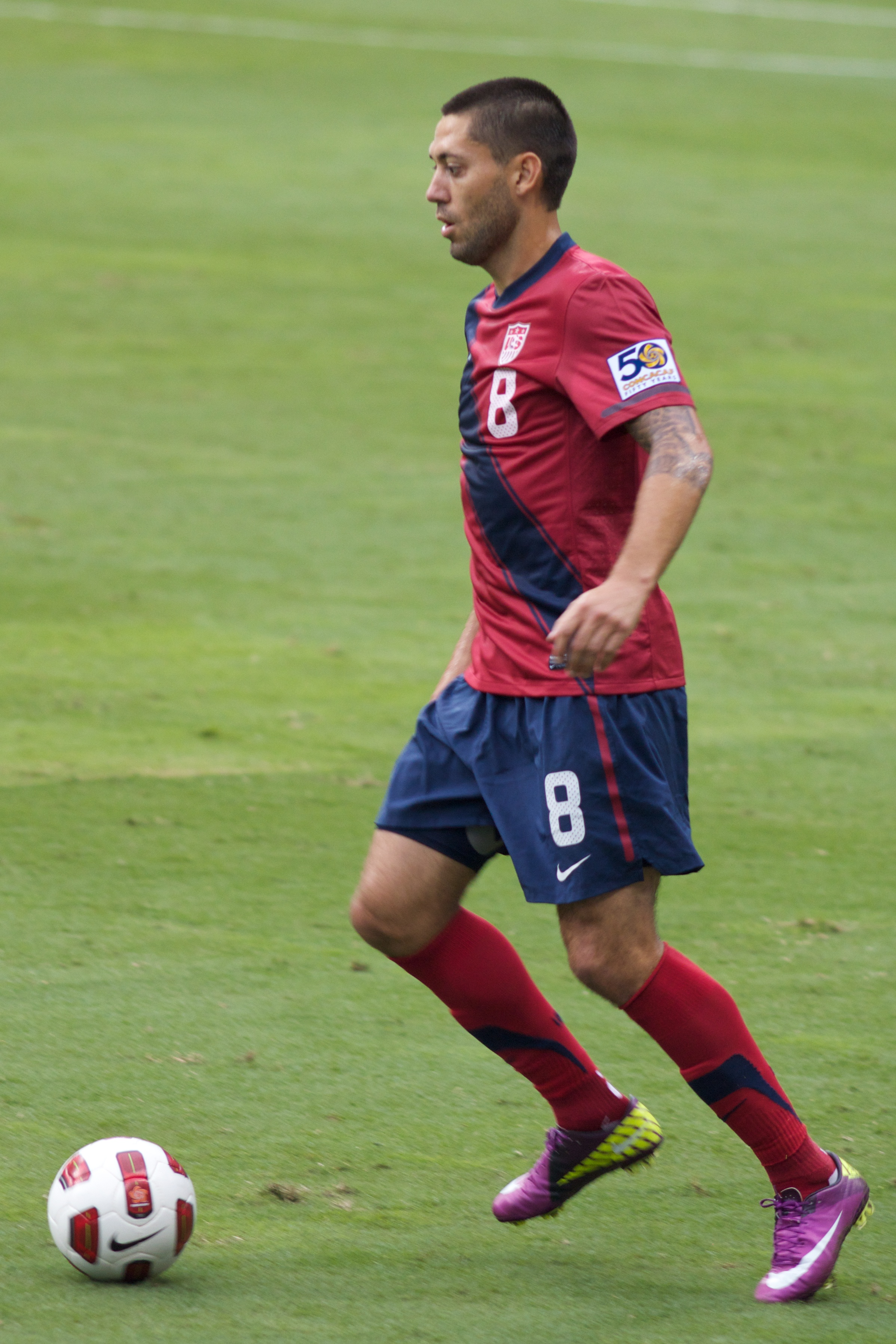
Clint Dempsey scored the second goal for the United States in their semi-final upset of Spain

The United States faced Group A winners Spain, the reigning European champions and a favourite to win the 2010 World Cup. The Americans earned an upset 2–0 victory in the semi-finals, breaking Spain's 35-match unbeaten streak that began in November 2006, and qualified for their first final at a major intercontinental men's tournament at the senior level in what was dubbed the "miracle on grass" by The New York Times. The Americans opened the match with early attacking pressure and disrupted Spain's midfield possession style. Jozy Altidore scored the first goal of the match in the 27th minute, shooting from the top of the box and benefiting from a pair of deflections off the gloves of Iker Casillas and the goalpost. The U.S. held on, despite being outshot 18–9 by Spain, and earned a second goal in the 74th minute with a pass by Landon Donovan that deflected off defenders Gerard Piqué and Sergio Ramos and fell to Clint Dempsey, who turned his body and shot from short range to make it 2–0.

Brazil played hosts South Africa, the Group A runners-up, in the other semi-final fixture a day later, winning 1–0. The match remained scoreless for 88 minutes, despite several chances for Brazil that went wide and two saves by goalkeeper Júlio César on a Siphiwe Tshabalala free kick and a long-range shot by Steven Pienaar. The deadlock was broken by substitute Dani Alves, who took a free kick that reached the far corner to beat goalkeeper Itumeleng Khune.

=== Summary of results ===
United States		Round	Brazil	
Opponent	Result	Group stage	Opponent	Result
Italy	1–3	Matchday 1	Egypt	4–3
Brazil	0–3	Matchday 2	United States	3–0
Egypt	3–0	Matchday 3	Italy	3–0
Group B runners-up: Pos / Team / Pld / W / D / L / GF / GA / GD / Pts; 1 / Brazil / 3 / 3 / 0 / 0 / 10 / 3 / +7 / 9 / Advance to knockout stage; 2 / United States / 3 / 1 / 0 / 2 / 4 / 6 / −2 / 3 / Advance to knockout stage; 3 / Italy / 3 / 1 / 0 / 2 / 3 / 5 / −2 / 3; 4 / Egypt / 3 / 1 / 0 / 2 / 4 / 7 / −3 / 3; Source: FIFA		Final standings	Group B winner: Pos / Team / Pld / W / D / L / GF / GA / GD / Pts; 1 / Brazil / 3 / 3 / 0 / 0 / 10 / 3 / +7 / 9 / Advance to knockout stage; 2 / United States / 3 / 1 / 0 / 2 / 4 / 6 / −2 / 3 / Advance to knockout stage; 3 / Italy / 3 / 1 / 0 / 2 / 3 / 5 / −2 / 3; 4 / Egypt / 3 / 1 / 0 / 2 / 4 / 7 / −3 / 3; Source: FIFA	
Opponent	Result	Knockout stage	Opponent	Result
Spain	2–0	Semi-finals	South Africa	1–0

== Venue ==
The final was played at Ellis Park Stadium in central Johannesburg, which also hosted four earlier matches and the 1995 Rugby World Cup final. It primarily serves as the home of Orlando Pirates F.C. and underwent minor renovations for the Confederations Cup and World Cup, raising its capacity to 61,000 spectators. The stadium's pitch was damaged by an international rugby fixture two weeks before the start of the tournament, requiring emergency work by grounds crews.

== Pre-match ==
=== Closing ceremony ===
The tournament's closing ceremony took place at Ellis Park Stadium prior to the final match and was produced by VWV Group and Till Dawn Entertainment, later chosen for the 2010 World Cup opening ceremony. The Confederations Cup ceremony featured 150 drummers, 150 choir singers from local churches, and 20 professional dancers, performing under a large ball with images of the tournament projected onto its surface. Zenani Mandela, the thirteen-year-old great-granddaughter of Nelson Mandela, carried the Confederations Cup trophy to the podium prior to the match.

=== Officials ===
Swedish referee Martin Hansson was selected by FIFA to lead the officiating team for the Confederations Cup final, his first assignment in a tournament final. Hansson had previously been in charge of the tournament's opening match and at several youth tournaments for FIFA. His compatriots Henrik Andrén and Frederik Nilsson served as assistant referees, while Mexican referee Benito Archundia was the fourth official. Héctor Vergara served as the reserve assistant referee (also called the fifth official).

== Match ==
=== Summary ===
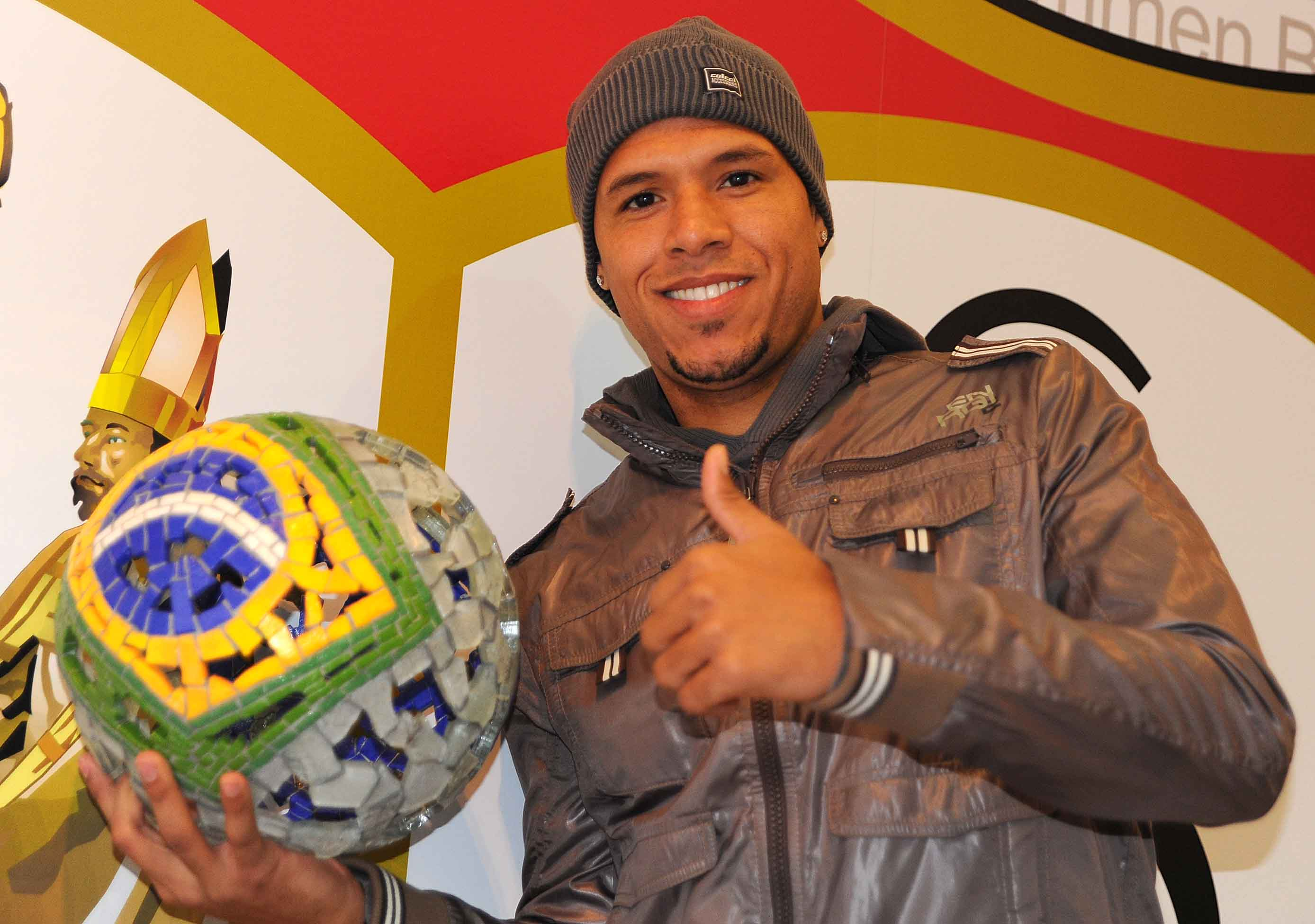
Luís Fabiano scored two goals during Brazil's second-half comeback to win the final

Brazilian manager Dunga chose to use the 4–2–3–1 formation that the team had used in their previous matches, while U.S. coach Bob Bradley used an adapted 4–4–2; midfielder Michael Bradley was suspended due to his red card in the semi-final and was replaced by Benny Feilhaber in the starting lineup. At a pre-match ceremony, FIFA honoured Cameroonian midfielder Marc-Vivien Foé, who died of a heart-related disease during a 2003 Confederations Cup semi-final match. Marc-Scott Foé read a commemorative message in tribute to his father's memory while both teams stood together at the centre circle.

The United States took an early lead in the 10th minute, following a free kick taken by Jonathan Spector that was crossed into the path of Clint Dempsey, who struck the ball with his right foot. Goalkeeper Tim Howard then made several major saves to preserve the lead amid several Brazilian attacks; the Americans took advantage of a counterattack, with Ricardo Clark running upfield and passing to Landon Donovan, shooting from just inside the box to score in the 27th minute. The team entered half-time with a 2–0 lead, described as a shock upset by commentators.

Brazil reduced the lead in the first minute of the second half, as Luís Fabiano scored in the penalty area by controlling the ball while turning around defender Jay DeMerit. In the 60th minute, Kaká headed the ball past the goal line, but it was knocked away by Tim Howard; replays showed that the ball had crossed the line, but it was not called in Brazil's favor. The equalising goal was scored in the 74th minute, following a cross by Kaká that was shot into the crossbar by Elano and ricocheted toward Fabiano, who headed the ball into the net. Elano's corner kick in the 84th minute was headed into the goal by Brazilian captain Lúcio, who had beaten Clint Dempsey to the ball.

=== Details ===
28 June 2009
20:30 SAST

United States	2–3	Brazil
Dempsey 10'; Donovan 27'	Report	Luís Fabiano 46', 74'; Lúcio 84'

Ellis Park Stadium, Johannesburg
Attendance: 52,291
Referee: Martin Hansson (Sweden)

United States	Brazil

GK	1	Tim Howard
RB	21	Jonathan Spector
CB	5	Oguchi Onyewu
CB	15	Jay DeMerit
LB	3	Carlos Bocanegra (c)	(yellow card) 19'
CM	13	Ricardo Clark		(substituted off) 88'
CM	22	Benny Feilhaber		(substituted off) 75'
RW	8	Clint Dempsey
LW	10	Landon Donovan
SS	17	Jozy Altidore		(substituted off) 75'
CF	9	Charlie Davies
Substitutions:
DF	2	Jonathan Bornstein		(substituted on) 75'
MF	16	Sacha Kljestan		(substituted on) 75'
FW	4	Conor Casey		(substituted on) 88'
Manager:
Bob Bradley

GK	1	Júlio César
RB	2	Maicon
CB	3	Lúcio (c)	(yellow card) 69'
CB	14	Luisão
LB	16	André Santos	(yellow card) 36'	(substituted off) 66'
CM	8	Gilberto Silva
CM	5	Felipe Melo	(yellow card) 25'
RW	18	Ramires		(substituted off) 67'
AM	10	Kaká
LW	11	Robinho
CF	9	Luís Fabiano
Substitutions:
DF	13	Dani Alves		(substituted on) 66'
MF	7	Elano		(substituted on) 67'
Manager:
Dunga

Man of the Match:
Kaká (Brazil)

Assistant referees:
Henrik Andrén (Sweden)
Fredrik Nilsson (Sweden)
Fourth official:
Benito Archundia (Mexico)
Fifth official:
Héctor Vergara (Canada)

== Post-match ==
Brazil became the second country to win consecutive editions of the Confederations Cup, following France's victories in 2001 and 2003 before the tournament switched to a quadrennial schedule. Kaká was named the man of the match for his performance and also won the Golden Ball as the tournament's best player. His teammate Luís Fabiano won the Golden Shoe, having scored five goals in five matches, and the Silver Ball. American goalkeeper Tim Howard won the tournament's Golden Glove award for his performances, including five saves in the first half of the final. In the 2010 World Cup, Brazil finished atop their group and defeated Chile in the Round of 16 before being eliminated by the Netherlands in the quarter-finals. Brazil hosted the next edition of the Confederations Cup in 2013 and became the first team to win three successive Confederations Cups by defeating Spain 3–0 in the final.

The U.S. broadcast of the match on ESPN was watched by an audience of 3.9 million people, the largest figure for a non-World Cup fixture on the network and among the largest ever for the U.S. men's national team. The United States returned home to contest the 2009 CONCACAF Gold Cup, which began less than a week after the final, but were granted an expanded roster by CONCACAF to prevent player fatigue. The Gold Cup roster was primarily drawn from Major League Soccer, with only four members of the Confederations Cup squad who were retained. The U.S. team advanced to the Gold Cup final, where they lost 5–0 to rivals Mexico and were unable to defend their continental title. The United States also topped their group in the 2010 World Cup, winning once and drawing twice, but were eliminated in the Round of 16 by Ghana.

== See also ==
- 2009 FIFA Confederations Cup knockout stage
