= 2009 FIFA Confederations Cup Group A =

Group A of the 2009 FIFA Confederations Cup took place from 14 to 20 June 2009 in Bloemfontein's Free State Stadium, Johannesburg's Ellis Park Stadium, and Rustenburg's Royal Bafokeng Stadium. The group consisted of Iraq, New Zealand, host nation South Africa, and Spain.

== Standings ==
Pos	Team	Pld	W	D	L	GF	GA	GD	Pts	Qualification
1	Spain	3	3	0	0	8	0	+8	9	Advance to knockout stage
2	South Africa (H)	3	1	1	1	2	2	0	4	Advance to knockout stage
3	Iraq	3	0	2	1	0	1	−1	2	
4	New Zealand	3	0	1	2	0	7	−7	1	

Source: FIFA
(H) Hosts

== Matches ==
=== South Africa vs Iraq ===
14 June 2009
16:00 SAST

South Africa	0–0	Iraq
	Report

Ellis Park Stadium, Johannesburg
Attendance: 48,837
Referee: Jorge Larrionda (Uruguay)

South Africa	Iraq

GK	16	Itumeleng Khune
RB	2	Siboniso Gaxa
CB	14	Matthew Booth
CB	4	Aaron Mokoena (c)
LB	3	Tsepo Masilela
RM	6	MacBeth Sibaya	(yellow card) 81'
CM	5	Benson Mhlongo
CM	13	Kagisho Dikgacoi
LM	12	Teko Modise
CF	18	Thembinkosi Fanteni	(yellow card) 2'	(substituted off) 78'
CF	17	Bernard Parker		(substituted off) 85'
Substitutions:
FW	21	Katlego Mashego		(substituted on) 78'
MF	10	Steven Pienaar		(substituted on) 85'
Manager:
(Brazil) Joel Santana

GK	12	Mohammed Gassid
RB	14	Salam Shaker
CB	2	Mohammed Ali Karim
CB	4	Fareed Majeed
CB	15	Ali Rehema
LB	3	Bassim Abbas
RM	18	Mahdi Karim		(substituted off) 88'
CM	5	Nashat Akram	(yellow card) 74'
LM	13	Karrar Jassim		(substituted off) 74'
CF	10	Younis Mahmoud (c)
CF	7	Emad Mohammed		(substituted off) 76'
Substitutions:
MF	11	Hawar Mulla Mohammed		(substituted on) 74'
FW	17	Alaa Abdul-Zahra		(substituted on) 76'
MF	6	Salih Sadir		(substituted on) 88'
Manager:
(Serbia) Bora Milutinović

Man of the Match:
Teko Modise (South Africa)

Assistant referees:
Pablo Fandiño (Uruguay)
Mauricio Espinosa (Uruguay)
Fourth official:
Martin Hansson (Sweden)
Fifth official:
Henrik Andrén (Sweden)

=== New Zealand vs Spain ===
14 June 2009
20:30 SAST

New Zealand	0–5	Spain
	Report	Torres 6', 14', 17'; Fàbregas 24'; Villa 48'

Royal Bafokeng Stadium, Rustenburg
Attendance: 21,649
Referee: Coffi Codjia (Benin)

New Zealand	Spain

GK	12	Glen Moss
RB	17	Dave Mulligan
CB	18	Andrew Boyens
CB	6	Ivan Vicelich
LB	3	Tony Lochhead
DM	7	Simon Elliott
RM	11	Leo Bertos
LM	15	Jeremy Brockie	(substituted off) 27'
AM	8	Tim Brown (c)
SS	10	Chris Killen	(substituted off) 85'
CF	9	Shane Smeltz	(substituted off) 76'
Substitutions:
MF	14	Jeremy Christie	(substituted on) 27'
MF	16	Chris James	(substituted on) 76'
FW	21	Kris Bright	(substituted on) 85'
Manager:
Ricki Herbert

GK	1	Iker Casillas (c)
RB	15	Sergio Ramos	(substituted off) 54'
CB	2	Raúl Albiol
CB	5	Carles Puyol
LB	11	Joan Capdevila
DM	14	Xabi Alonso
RM	8	Xavi	(substituted off) 54'
LM	18	Albert Riera
AM	10	Cesc Fàbregas
SS	7	David Villa
CF	9	Fernando Torres	(substituted off) 70'
Substitutions:
DF	19	Álvaro Arbeloa	(substituted on) 54'
MF	20	Santi Cazorla	(substituted on) 54'
MF	21	David Silva	(substituted on) 70'
Manager:
Vicente del Bosque

Man of the Match:
Fernando Torres (Spain)

Assistant referees:
Komi Konyoh (Togo)
Alexis Fassinou (Benin)
Fourth official:
Massimo Busacca (Switzerland)
Fifth official:
Matthias Arnet (Switzerland)

=== Spain vs Iraq ===
17 June 2009
16:00 SAST

Spain	1–0	Iraq
Villa 55'	Report

Free State Stadium, Bloemfontein
Attendance: 30,512
Referee: Matthew Breeze (Australia)

Spain	Iraq

GK	1	Iker Casillas (c)
RB	15	Sergio Ramos
CB	3	Gerard Piqué
CB	4	Carlos Marchena	(yellow card) 53'
LB	11	Joan Capdevila
DM	14	Xabi Alonso	(yellow card) 38'
RM	20	Santi Cazorla		(substituted off) 67'
CM	8	Xavi		(substituted off) 82'
LM	22	Juan Mata
SS	7	David Villa		(substituted off) 74'
CF	9	Fernando Torres
Substitutions:
MF	21	David Silva		(substituted on) 67'
FW	17	Dani Güiza		(substituted on) 74'
MF	12	Sergio Busquets		(substituted on) 82'
Manager:
Vicente del Bosque

GK	12	Mohammed Gassid
RB	14	Salam Shaker
CB	2	Mohammed Ali Karim
CB	4	Fareed Majeed
CB	15	Ali Rehema
LB	3	Bassim Abbas	(yellow card) 29'
DM	22	Muayad Khalid		(substituted off) 74'
RM	20	Samer Saeed		(substituted off) 76'
CM	5	Nashat Akram (c)		(substituted off) 88'
LM	11	Hawar Mulla Mohammed
CF	17	Alaa Abdul-Zahra
Substitutions:
MF	18	Mahdi Karim		(substituted on) 74'
MF	13	Karrar Jassim		(substituted on) 76'
FW	10	Younis Mahmoud		(substituted on) 88'
Manager:
(Serbia) Bora Milutinović

Man of the Match:
Xabi Alonso (Spain)

Assistant referees:
Matthew Cream (Australia)
Ben Wilson (Australia)
Fourth official:
Eddy Maillet (Seychelles)
Fifth official:
Bechir Hassani (Tunisia)

=== South Africa vs New Zealand ===
17 June 2009
20:30 SAST

South Africa	2–0	New Zealand
Parker 21', 52'	Report

Royal Bafokeng Stadium, Rustenburg
Attendance: 36,598
Referee: Benito Archundia (Mexico)

South Africa	New Zealand

GK	16	Itumeleng Khune
RB	2	Siboniso Gaxa
CB	14	Matthew Booth
CB	4	Aaron Mokoena (c)
LB	3	Tsepo Masilela
CM	13	Kagisho Dikgacoi
CM	6	MacBeth Sibaya
RW	10	Steven Pienaar	(yellow card) 80'
AM	17	Bernard Parker		(substituted off) 81'
LW	12	Teko Modise
CF	18	Thembinkosi Fanteni		(substituted off) 62'
Substitutions:
FW	21	Katlego Mashego		(substituted on) 62'
FW	8	Siphiwe Tshabalala		(substituted on) 81'
Manager:
(Brazil) Joel Santana

GK	12	Glen Moss
RB	17	Dave Mulligan
CB	18	Andrew Boyens	(yellow card) 72'
CB	6	Ivan Vicelich	(yellow card) 90+3'
LB	3	Tony Lochhead
DM	7	Simon Elliott
RM	11	Leo Bertos		(substituted off) 66'
LM	14	Jeremy Christie	(yellow card) 53'
AM	8	Tim Brown (c)		(substituted off) 55'
CF	9	Shane Smeltz	(yellow card) 85'
CF	10	Chris Killen		(substituted off) 75'
Substitutions:
MF	4	Duncan Oughton		(substituted on) 55'
MF	16	Chris James		(substituted on) 66'
FW	20	Chris Wood		(substituted on) 75'
Manager:
Ricki Herbert

Man of the Match:
Bernard Parker (South Africa)

Assistant referees:
Marvin Torrentera (Mexico)
Héctor Vergara (Canada)
Fourth official:
Pablo Pozo (Chile)
Fifth official:
Patricio Basualto (Chile)

=== Iraq vs New Zealand ===
20 June 2009
20:30 SAST

Iraq	0–0	New Zealand
	Report

Ellis Park Stadium, Johannesburg
Attendance: 23,295
Referee: Howard Webb (England)

Iraq	New Zealand

GK	12	Mohammed Gassid
RB	2	Mohammed Ali Karim
CB	15	Ali Rehema
CB	14	Salam Shaker
LB	3	Bassim Abbas
RM	18	Mahdi Karim	(substituted off) 67'
CM	5	Nashat Akram
CM	11	Hawar Mulla Mohammed	(substituted off) 46'
LM	13	Karrar Jassim
CF	7	Emad Mohammed	(substituted off) 56'
CF	10	Younis Mahmoud (c)
Substitutions:
MF	4	Fareed Majeed	(substituted on) 46'
FW	17	Alaa Abdul-Zahra	(substituted on) 56'
MF	6	Salih Sadir	(substituted on) 67'
Manager:
(Serbia) Bora Milutinović

GK	12	Glen Moss
RB	2	Aaron Scott		(substituted off) 85'
CB	5	Ben Sigmund		(substituted off) 71'
CB	6	Ivan Vicelich
LB	3	Tony Lochhead
DM	7	Simon Elliott
RM	15	Jeremy Brockie	(yellow card) 61'	(substituted off) 68'
CM	8	Tim Brown (c)	(yellow card) 35'
LM	11	Leo Bertos
SS	9	Shane Smeltz
CF	10	Chris Killen
Substitutions:
MF	14	Jeremy Christie		(substituted on) 68'
MF	18	Andrew Boyens		(substituted on) 71'
FW	17	Dave Mulligan		(substituted on) 85'
Manager:
Ricki Herbert

Man of the Match:
Shane Smeltz (New Zealand)

Assistant referees:
Peter Kirkup (England)
Michael Mullarkey (England)
Fourth official:
Jorge Larrionda (Uruguay)
Fifth official:
Mauricio Espinosa (Uruguay)

=== Spain vs South Africa ===
20 June 2009
20:30 SAST

Spain	2–0	South Africa
Villa 52'; Llorente 72'	Report

Free State Stadium, Bloemfontein
Attendance: 38,212
Referee: Pablo Pozo (Chile)

Spain	South Africa

GK	23	Pepe Reina
RB	5	Carles Puyol (c)
CB	3	Gerard Piqué	(yellow card) 56'
CB	2	Raúl Albiol	(yellow card) 24'
LB	19	Álvaro Arbeloa
DM	12	Sergio Busquets
RM	10	Cesc Fàbregas
LM	18	Albert Riera		(substituted off) 81'
AM	8	Xavi
SS	7	David Villa		(substituted off) 60'
CF	9	Fernando Torres		(substituted off) 60'
Substitutions:
MF	6	Pablo Hernández		(substituted on) 60'
FW	16	Fernando Llorente		(substituted on) 60'
MF	20	Santi Cazorla		(substituted on) 81'
Manager:
Vicente del Bosque

GK	16	Itumeleng Khune
RB	2	Siboniso Gaxa
CB	4	Aaron Mokoena (c)
CB	14	Matthew Booth
LB	3	Tsepo Masilela
CM	5	Benson Mhlongo
CM	6	MacBeth Sibaya	(yellow card) 5'	(substituted off) 83'
RW	10	Steven Pienaar
AM	13	Kagisho Dikgacoi	(yellow card) 54'
LW	12	Teko Modise	(yellow card) 53'
CF	17	Bernard Parker		(substituted off) 90+3'
Substitutions:
FW	21	Katlego Mashego		(substituted on) 83'
FW	8	Siphiwe Tshabalala		(substituted on) 90+3'
Manager:
(Brazil) Joel Santana

Man of the Match:
Xavi (Spain)

Assistant referees:
Patricio Basualto (Chile)
Francisco Mondria (Chile)
Fourth official:
Eddy Maillet (Seychelles)
Fifth official:
Bechir Hassani (Tunisia)
