= Ellis Park Stadium =

Stadium in Johannesburg, South Africa

Ellis Park
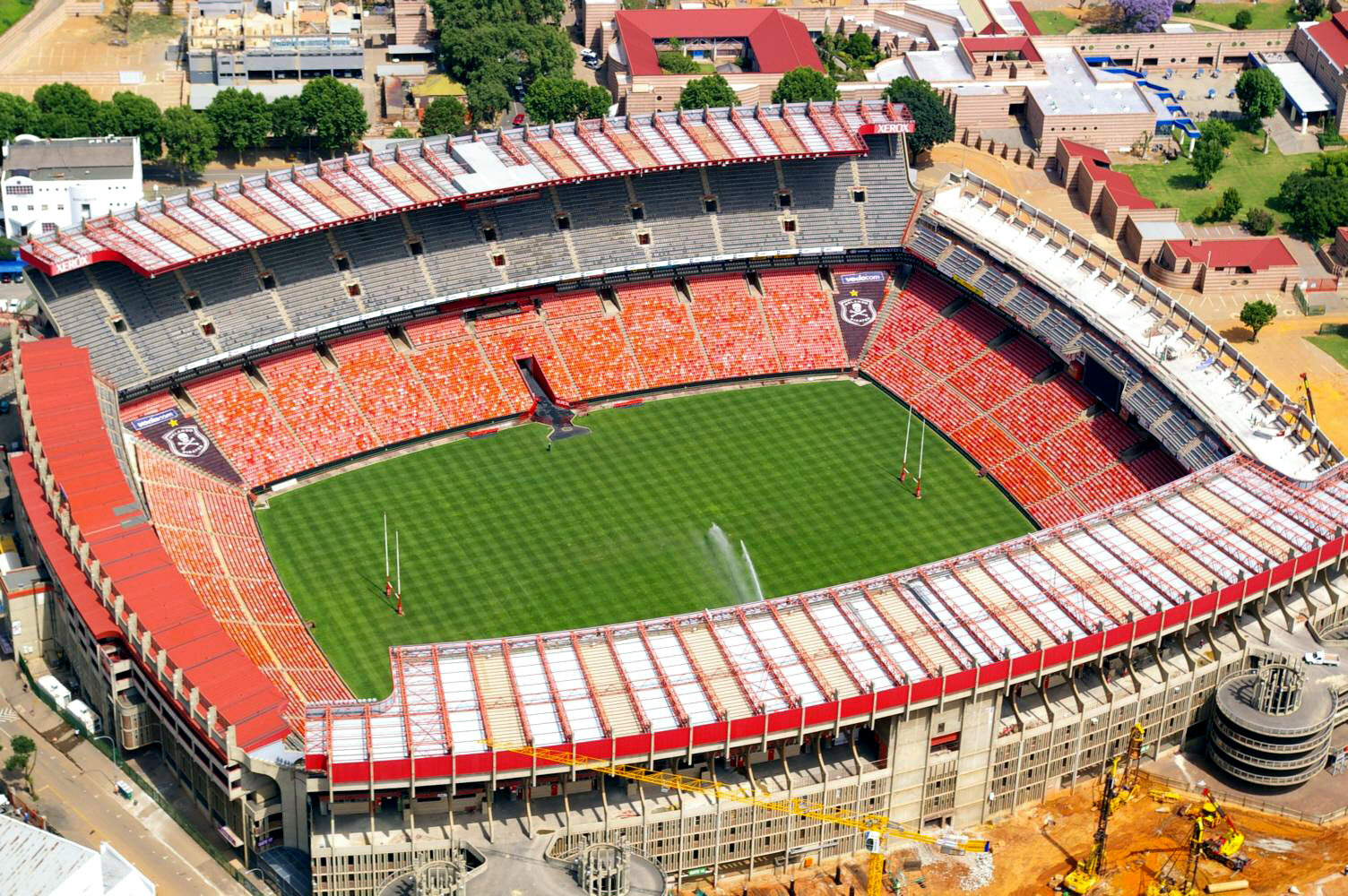
- Ellis Park Stadium in July 2009
- Interactive map of Ellis Park
- Full name: Ellis Park Stadium
- Former names: Coca-Cola Park (2008–12); Emirates Airline Park (2015–25)
- Location: 47 N. Park Lane Doornfontein, Johannesburg, Gauteng Province, 2028
- Coordinates: 26°11′51″S 28°3′39″E
- Owner: City of Johannesburg, Luxolo Tyhaliti Holdings, Interza Lesego, Ellis Park Stadium (Pty) Ltd
- Operator: Ellis Park World of Sport
- Capacity: 62,567 (Rugby union and soccer); 55,686 (2010 FIFA World Cup)
- Surface: Grass

Construction
- Groundbreaking: 1927; 99 years ago
- Built: 1927–1928
- Opened: June 1928; 98 years ago
- Renovated: 1982
- Expanded: 2009
- Cost: R 40 Million

Tenants
- Lions (1996–present); Golden Lions; South Africa national rugby union team (selected matches)

Ellis Park Stadium is a rugby union and association football stadium in Johannesburg, Gauteng, South Africa. It hosted the final of the 1995 Rugby World Cup, which was won by the country's national team, the Springboks. The stadium was the country's most modern when it was upgraded in 1982 to accommodate almost 60,000 people.

Today, the stadium hosts both football and rugby and is also used as a venue for other large events, such as open-air concerts. It has become synonymous with rugby as the only time when rugby was not played at Ellis Park was during 1980 and 1981, when the stadium was under construction during the upgrade.

The stadium was originally named after J. D. Ellis, who made the area for the stadium available. A five-year ZAR 450 million (US$58 million/£30 million) naming rights deal was signed in 2008 with The Coca-Cola Company, resulting in the stadium being named Coca-Cola Park between 2008 and 2012. The stadium was then known as Emirates Airline Park from 2015 until June 2025 after Emirates bought the naming rights. In July 2026, 10bet acquired the naming rights for five years, renaming the stadium to 10bet Ellis Park.

League, provincial, and international football games have all been played at the stadium, and it has seen such teams as Brazil, Manchester United and Arsenal play. Ellis Park Stadium is the centrepiece of a sporting sector in the south-east of Johannesburg, where it neighbours Johannesburg Stadium (athletics), Standard Bank Arena, Ellis Park Tennis Stadium, and an Olympic-class swimming pool.

Ellis Park is home to the following teams:

- Lions (Cats until September 2006), United Rugby Championship.
- Golden Lions, Currie Cup domestic rugby competition

Cricket matches were held at the stadium in the past. Ellis Park hosted six Test matches between 1948 and 1954, but it has not been used for first-class cricket since New Wanderers Stadium opened in 1956 and is now only used for rugby and football.

== History ==
In 1889, the Transvaal Rugby Football Union (now the Golden Lions Rugby Union) was formed and established a domain. The first games were played at the Wanderers Club's stadium whose grounds were situated where Johannesburg Park Station is today. Rows between the different rugby clubs as well as the Wanderers Club's claim of the field for the use of cricket games, forced the Transvaal Rugby Football Union to look for an alternative.

An area with a quarry and garbage dumps in Doornfontein was identified in, 1927 as the possible alternative. The Transvaal Rugby Football Union negotiated with the Johannesburg City Council's J. D. Ellis (after whom Ellis Park was named) for the availability of these grounds and 13 acres (53,000 m^{2}) was made available. On 10 October 1927 the final rental agreement was signed. A quote of £600 was accepted for the grass and with a loan from the city council to the amount of £5,000, the building of the new stadium could commence. The stadium was built in eight months and in June 1928 the first test was played against the All Blacks. Thus was born Ellis Park which became internationally renowned and synonymous with rugby. Crowds of between 38,000 and a record crowd of 95,000 against the British and Irish Lions (in 1955) attended the matches.

Ellis Park played the host for cricket matches after an agreement was reached between Transvaal Rugby Football Union and The Transvaal Cricket Union. From 1947 when the cricket pitch was laid until 1956, Ellis Park was host to various cricket matches with the final games played in the 1953/54 series against New Zealand. Cricket then moved to its new venue where the current Wanderers still is today.

On 28 April 1969 the Transvaal Rugby Football Union formed a stadium committee to investigate the possibilities of a new stadium since the one in use did not meet all the modern requirements. Fifteen years later, after the game between Transvaal and the World Team on 31 March 1979, the old Ellis Park was demolished. Games were played at the Wanderers while the stadium was being rebuilt.

A new Transvaal Rugby Football Union management was elected in 1984 with Louis Luyt as chairman and Joe Poolman as his deputy. The decision was taken to place Ellis Park Stadium under the management of a trust. In 1987 after the Ellis Park Stadium was listed on the stock exchange and due to sound financial management by Luyt, Ellis Park could announce that the debt to the amount of R53 million was fully paid and a further 86 suites could be erected.

In 2005 Ellis Park became the first black-owned stadium in South Africa. The Golden Lions Rugby Football Union passed the management of the Ellis Park Precinct to a company with 51% black ownership. Orlando Pirates, Interza Lesego and Ellis Park Stadium (Pty) Ltd make up the new management of the Ellis Park Precinct.

The stadium was witness to an incident during a Premiership football match between Orlando Pirates and Black Leopards on 17 January 2007, when high winds blew several sideline advertising boards onto the pitch, striking a linesman and three players. Play resumed 7 minutes later, but the match was ultimately abandoned 6 minutes before full-time due to sudden torrential rains and lightning. The game's kickoff previously had been delayed 15 minutes by a power failure.

=== Disaster of 11 April 2001 ===
In 2001 a crowd crush occurred during a football game between Orlando Pirates and Kaizer Chiefs. With 43 people killed, the Ellis Park Stadium disaster is to date the biggest of its kind in South Africa.

=== Crime ===
The inner city suburb of Doornfontein has experienced increasing crime, leading to a number of incidents affecting stadium goers, and impacting stadium attendances. As a result, there have been calls for South African rugby to move to another venue in Johannesburg.

=== Sponsorship ===
Originally named after J. D. Ellis, a five-year ZAR 450 million (US$58 million/£30 million) naming rights deal was signed in 2008 with The Coca-Cola Company, resulting in the stadium being named Coca-Cola Park between 2008 and 2012. The stadium was then known as Emirates Airline Park from 2015 until June 2025 after Emirates bought the naming rights. In July 2026, 10bet acquired the naming rights for five years, renaming the stadium to 10bet Ellis Park.

== Concerts ==
On 12 January 1985, Ellis Park Stadium was the venue for Concert in the Park, a benefit concert organised by Hilton Rosenthal. 22 artists played the benefit, which raised money for Operation Hunger, a South African non-profit organisation.

Among the touring artists who have performed at the Stadium are:

Artist	Date	Tour
Whitney Houston	12 November 1994	The Bodyguard World Tour
Roxette	15 January 1995	Crash! Boom! Bang! Tour
Rolling Stones	24 & 25 February 1995	Voodoo Lounge Tour
Phil Collins	17 March 1995	Both Sides of the World Tour
Janet Jackson	21 November 1998	Velvet Rope Tour
Eminem	1 March 2014	Rapture Tour

Whitney Houston's concert was recorded and released as a home video titled: Whitney: The Concert for a New South Africa). A year later also Roxette's concert during the Crash! Boom! Bang! World Tour was recorded and released on VHS home video.

== Sporting events ==
=== 1995 Rugby World Cup ===
In 1995, South Africa hosted the Rugby World Cup, and the final was held at Ellis Park on 24 June in front of 65,000 spectators. South Africa beat New Zealand 15–12 in extra time.

Date	Team 1	Result	Team 2	Round	Attendance
27 May 1995	Ireland	19–43	New Zealand	Pool C	38,000
31 May 1995	New Zealand	34–9	Wales	Pool C	38,000
4 June 1995	Ireland	24–23	Wales	Pool C	35,000
10 June 1995	South Africa	42–14	Western Samoa	Quarter-finals	52,000
24 June 1995	South Africa	15–12 (aet)	New Zealand	Final	65,000

=== 2009 FIFA Confederations Cup ===
Ellis Park was one of the host venues for the 2009 FIFA Confederations Cup.

Date	Time (SAST)	Team 1	Result	Team 2	Round	Attendance
14 June 2009	16:00	South Africa	0–0	Iraq	Group A (opening match)	48,837
18 June 2009	20:30	Egypt	1–0	Italy	Group B	52,150
20 June 2009	20:30	Iraq	0–0	New Zealand	Group A	23,295
25 June 2009	20:30	Brazil	1–0	South Africa	Semi-finals	48,049
28 June 2009	20.30	United States	2–3	Brazil	Final	52,291

=== 2010 FIFA World Cup ===
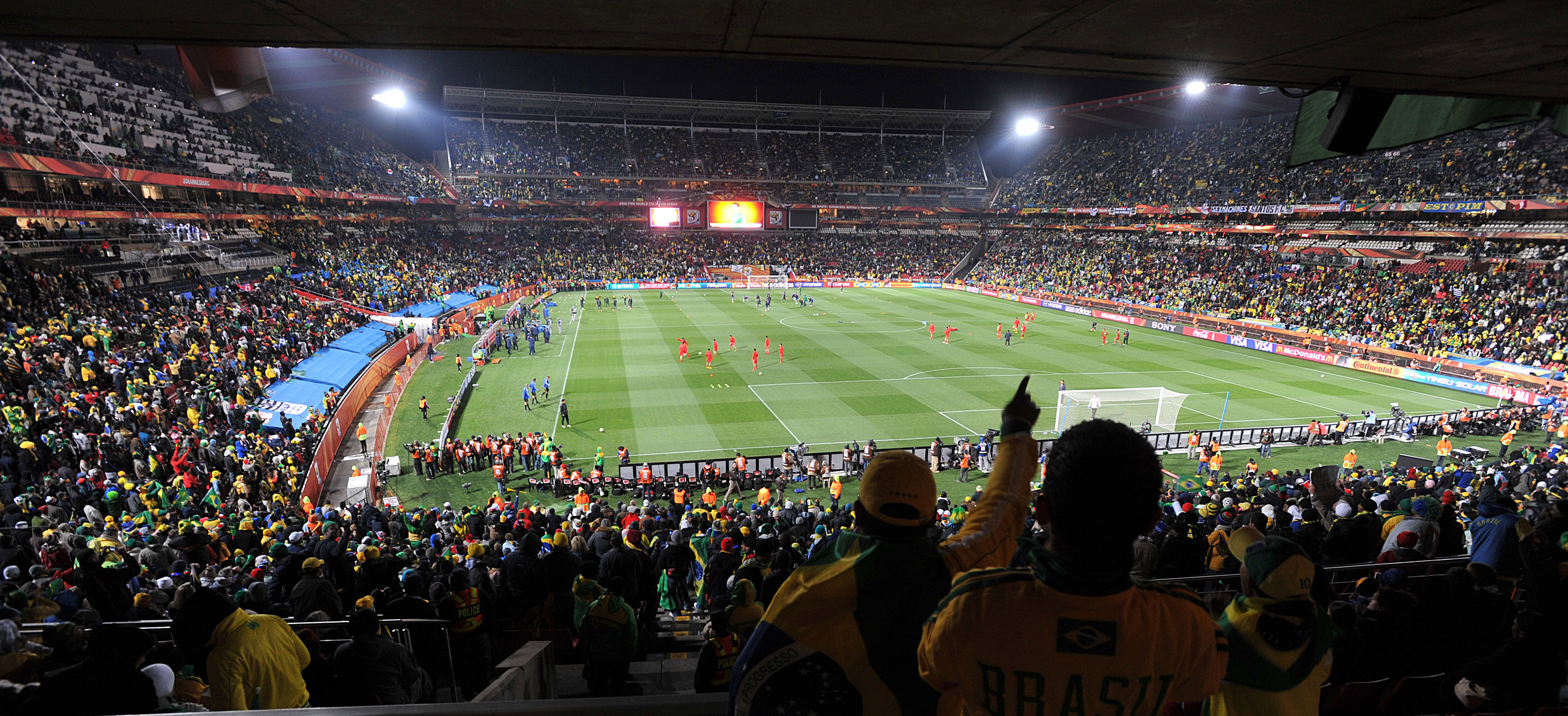
Brazil vs North Korea match

Ellis Park hosted five group games, one second-round game and one quarter-final of the 2010 FIFA World Cup, for which its capacity was increased by 5,000 seats on the northern side only, to 62,000. Areas like the Presidential suite also received a facelift. There was also a hospitality room and new changing rooms. The total cost of renovations was R500 million and were completed in June 2008, two years before the World Cup.

Date	Time (SAST)	Team 1	Result	Team 2	Round	Attendance
12 June 2010	16:00	Argentina	1–0	Nigeria	Group B	55,686
15 June 2010	20:30	Brazil	2–1	North Korea	Group G	54,331
18 June 2010	16:00	Slovenia	2–2	United States	Group C	45,573
21 June 2010	20:30	Spain	2–0	Honduras	Group H	54,386
24 June 2010	16:00	Slovakia	3–2	Italy	Group F	53,412
28 June 2010	20:30	Brazil	3–0	Chile	Round of 16	54,096
3 July 2010	20:30	Paraguay	0–1	Spain	Quarter-finals	55,359

== Cricket Records ==
=== Test centuries ===
A total of 13 Test match centuries were scored on the ground.

No.	Player	Score	Date	Team	Opposing team	Inn.	Result
1	Len Hutton	158	27 December 1948	England	South Africa	1	Drawn
2	Cyril Washbrook	195	27 December 1948	England	South Africa	1	Drawn
3	Denis Compton	114	27 December 1948	England	South Africa	1	Drawn
4	Eric Rowan	156*	27 December 1948	South Africa	England	3	Drawn
5	Allan Watkins	111	12 February 1949	England	South Africa	1	Drawn
6	Dudley Nourse	129*	12 February 1949	South Africa	England	2	Drawn
7	Len Hutton	123	12 February 1949	England	South Africa	3	Drawn
8	Lindsay Hassett	112	24 December 1949	Australia	South Africa	1	Australia won
9	Sam Loxton	101	24 December 1949	Australia	South Africa	1	Australia won
10	Arthur Morris	111	10 February 1950	Australia	South Africa	1	Australia won
11	Jack Moroney (Note: Moroney scored two centuries in the match.)	118	10 February 1950	Australia	South Africa	1	Australia won
12	Jack Moroney	101*	10 February 1950	Australia	South Africa	3	Australia won
13	Neil Harvey	100	10 February 1950	Australia	South Africa	3	Australia won

=== Test match five-wicket hauls ===
Eight five-wicket hauls were taken in Test matches on the ground.

Five-wicket hauls in men's Test matches at Ellis Park
No.	Bowler	Date	Team	Opposing team	Inn	O	R	W	Result
1	Cuan McCarthy	12 February 1949	South Africa	England	1	35.7 (Note: Eight-ball overs were used in this match.)	114	5	Drawn
2	Keith Miller (Note: Miller took his five-wicket haul in the second innings of the match and Johnston his in the third after South Africa were asked to follow on.)	24 December 1949	Australia	South Africa	2	15	40	5	Australia won
3	Bill Johnston	24 December 1949	Australia	South Africa	3	20.1	44	6	Australia won
4	Michael Melle (Note: Melle took his five-wicket haul on his Test match debut.)	10 February 1950	South Africa	Australia	1	33	113	5	Drawn
5	David Ironside (Note: Ironside took his five-wicket haul on his Test match debut.)	24 December 1953	South Africa	New Zealand	2	19	51	5	South Africa won
6	Neil Adcock	24 December 1953	South Africa	New Zealand	4	19	43	5	South Africa won
7	Hugh Tayfield	29 January 1954	South Africa	New Zealand	2	14	13	6	South Africa won
8	Neil Adcock	29 January 1954	South Africa	New Zealand	3	26	45	5	South Africa won

== See also ==
- List of rugby union stadiums by capacity
- List of stadiums in South Africa
- List of Test cricket grounds
- Lists of stadiums
- Ellis Park Stadium Disaster
- Orlando Pirates FC
- Johannesburg Stadium
- Soccer City

== Notes ==
Preceded by Royal King's Park T.C. Perth	Fed Cup; Final Venue; 1972	Succeeded by Bad Homburg T.C. Bad Homburg
Preceded by Twickenham; London	Rugby World Cup; Final venue 1995	Succeeded by Millennium Stadium; Cardiff
Preceded by Waldstadion; Frankfurt	FIFA Confederations Cup; Final venue 2009	Succeeded by Estádio do Maracanã; Rio de Janeiro
