= 2009 FIFA Confederations Cup Group B =

Football tournament group stage

Group B of the 2009 FIFA Confederations Cup took place from 15 to 21 June 2009 in Bloemfontein's Free State Stadium, Johannesburg's Ellis Park Stadium, Pretoria's Loftus Versfeld Stadium and Rustenburg's Royal Bafokeng Stadium. The group consisted of defending champions Brazil, Egypt, Italy, and the United States.

== Standings ==
Pos	Team	Pld	W	D	L	GF	GA	GD	Pts	
1	Brazil	3	3	0	0	10	3	+7	9	Advance to knockout stage
2	United States	3	1	0	2	4	6	−2	3	Advance to knockout stage
3	Italy	3	1	0	2	3	5	−2	3	
4	Egypt	3	1	0	2	4	7	−3	3	

Source: FIFA

== Matches ==
=== Brazil vs Egypt ===
15 June 2009
16:00 SAST

Brazil	4–3	Egypt
Kaká 5', 90+1' (pen.); Luís Fabiano 11'; Juan 37'	Report	Zidan 9', 56'; Shawky 54'

Free State Stadium, Bloemfontein
Attendance: 27,851
Referee: Howard Webb (England)

Brazil	Egypt

GK	1	Júlio César
RB	13	Dani Alves
CB	3	Lúcio (c)
CB	4	Juan
LB	6	Kléber	(substituted off) 83'
DM	8	Gilberto Silva
RM	7	Elano	(substituted off) 62'
LM	5	Felipe Melo
AM	10	Kaká
SS	11	Robinho	(substituted off) 62'
CF	9	Luís Fabiano
Substitutions:
MF	18	Ramires	(substituted on) 62'
FW	21	Alexandre Pato	(substituted on) 62'
DF	16	André Santos	(substituted on) 83'
Manager:
Dunga

GK	1	Essam El-Hadary
SW	6	Hany Said
RB	7	Ahmed Fathy
CB	4	Ahmed Said
CB	20	Wael Gomaa
LB	14	Sayed Moawad	(yellow card) 87'
RM	11	Mohamed Shawky
CM	8	Hosny Abd Rabo		(substituted off) 75'
LM	17	Ahmed Hassan (c)		(substituted off) 51'
AM	22	Mohamed Aboutrika
CF	9	Mohamed Zidan
Substitutions:
MF	10	Ahmed Eid Abdel Malek		(substituted on) 51'
DF	3	Ahmed Elmohamady	(red card) 89'	(substituted on) 75'
Manager:
Hassan Shehata

Man of the Match:
Kaká (Brazil)

Assistant referees:
Peter Kirkup (England)
Michael Mullarkey (England)
Fourth official:
Matthew Breeze (Australia)
Fifth official:
Matthew Cream (Australia)

=== United States vs Italy ===
15 June 2009
20:30 SAST

United States	1–3	Italy
Donovan 41' (pen.)	Report	Rossi 58', 90+4'; De Rossi 72'

Loftus Versfeld Stadium, Pretoria
Attendance: 34,341
Referee: Pablo Pozo (Chile)

United States	Italy

GK	1	Tim Howard
RB	21	Jonathan Spector
CB	15	Jay DeMerit
CB	5	Oguchi Onyewu
LB	2	Jonathan Bornstein	(yellow card) 20'	(substituted off) 86'
CM	12	Michael Bradley
CM	13	Ricardo Clark	(red card) 33'
AM	22	Benny Feilhaber		(substituted off) 72'
RW	8	Clint Dempsey
LW	10	Landon Donovan (c)
CF	17	Jozy Altidore		(substituted off) 66'
Substitutions:
FW	9	Charlie Davies		(substituted on) 66'
MF	7	DaMarcus Beasley		(substituted on) 72'
MF	16	Sacha Kljestan		(substituted on) 86'
Manager:
Bob Bradley

GK	1	Gianluigi Buffon (c)
RB	19	Gianluca Zambrotta
CB	6	Nicola Legrottaglie	(yellow card) 10'
CB	4	Giorgio Chiellini
LB	3	Fabio Grosso	(yellow card) 35'
CM	8	Gennaro Gattuso		(substituted off) 57'
CM	10	Daniele De Rossi
CM	21	Andrea Pirlo
RW	16	Mauro Camoranesi		(substituted off) 57'
LW	15	Vincenzo Iaquinta
CF	11	Alberto Gilardino		(substituted off) 69'
Substitutions:
MF	20	Riccardo Montolivo		(substituted on) 57'
FW	17	Giuseppe Rossi		(substituted on) 57'
FW	9	Luca Toni		(substituted on) 69'
Manager:
Marcello Lippi

Man of the Match:
Daniele De Rossi (Italy)

Assistant referees:
Patricio Basualto (Chile)
Francisco Mondria (Chile)
Fourth official:
Eddy Maillet (Seychelles)
Fifth official:
Evarist Menkouande (Cameroon)

=== United States vs Brazil ===
18 June 2009
16:00 SAST

United States	0–3	Brazil
	Report	Felipe Melo 7'; Robinho 20'; Maicon 62'

Loftus Versfeld Stadium, Pretoria
Attendance: 39,617
Referee: Massimo Busacca (Switzerland)

United States	Brazil

GK	1	Tim Howard
RB	21	Jonathan Spector
CB	5	Oguchi Onyewu	(yellow card) 33'
CB	15	Jay DeMerit
LB	2	Jonathan Bornstein
CM	12	Michael Bradley
CM	7	DaMarcus Beasley		(substituted off) 46'
AM	16	Sacha Kljestan	(red card) 57'
RW	8	Clint Dempsey
LW	10	Landon Donovan (c)
CF	17	Jozy Altidore		(substituted off) 60'
Substitutions:
FW	4	Conor Casey		(substituted on) 46'
MF	22	Benny Feilhaber		(substituted on) 60'
Manager:
Bob Bradley

GK	1	Júlio César
RB	2	Maicon
CB	3	Lúcio (c)	(substituted off) 70'
CB	15	Miranda
LB	16	André Santos
DM	8	Gilberto Silva
CM	18	Ramires
CM	5	Felipe Melo
AM	10	Kaká	(substituted off) 69'
SS	11	Robinho
CF	9	Luís Fabiano	(substituted off) 69'
Substitutions:
MF	19	Júlio Baptista	(substituted on) 69'
FW	22	Nilmar	(substituted on) 69'
DF	14	Luisão	(substituted on) 70'
Manager:
Dunga

Man of the Match:
Maicon (Brazil)

Assistant referees:
Matthias Arnet (Switzerland)
Francisco Buragina (Switzerland)
Fourth official:
Coffi Codjia (Benin)
Fifth official:
Alexis Fassinou (Benin)

=== Egypt vs Italy ===
18 June 2009
20:30 SAST

Egypt	1–0	Italy
Homos 39'	Report

Ellis Park Stadium, Johannesburg
Attendance: 52,150
Referee: Martin Hansson (Sweden)

Egypt	Italy

GK	1	Essam El-Hadary (c)	(yellow card) 93'
SW	6	Hany Said
RB	7	Ahmed Fathy		(substituted off) 80'
CB	4	Ahmed Said
CB	20	Wael Gomaa	(yellow card) 94'
LB	14	Sayed Moawad		(substituted off) 69'
CM	11	Mohamed Shawky
CM	12	Homos
AM	22	Mohamed Aboutrika
AM	8	Hosny Abd Rabo
CF	9	Mohamed Zidan		(substituted off) 57'
Substitutions:
MF	10	Ahmed Eid Abdel Malek	(yellow card) 58'	(substituted on) 57'
MF	15	Ahmed Samir Farag		(substituted on) 69'
MF	17	Ahmed Hassan		(substituted on) 80'
Manager:
Hassan Shehata

GK	1	Gianluigi Buffon
RB	19	Gianluca Zambrotta
CB	5	Fabio Cannavaro (c)
CB	4	Giorgio Chiellini
LB	3	Fabio Grosso
DM	10	Daniele De Rossi
CM	8	Gennaro Gattuso	(substituted off) 58'
CM	21	Andrea Pirlo
RW	23	Fabio Quagliarella	(substituted off) 64'
LW	17	Giuseppe Rossi	(substituted off) 58'
CF	15	Vincenzo Iaquinta
Substitutions:
MF	20	Riccardo Montolivo	(substituted on) 58'
FW	9	Luca Toni	(substituted on) 58'
FW	7	Simone Pepe	(substituted on) 64'
Manager:
Marcello Lippi

Man of the Match:
Homos (Egypt)

Assistant referees:
Henrik Andrén (Sweden)
Fredrik Nilsson (Sweden)
Fourth official:
Jorge Larrionda (Uruguay)
Fifth official:
Pablo Fandiño (Uruguay)

=== Italy vs Brazil ===
21 June 2009
20:30 SAST

Italy	0–3	Brazil
	Report	Luís Fabiano 37', 43'; Dossena 45' (o.g.)

Loftus Versfeld Stadium, Pretoria
Attendance: 41,195
Referee: Benito Archundia (Mexico)

Italy	Brazil

GK	1	Gianluigi Buffon
RB	19	Gianluca Zambrotta
CB	5	Fabio Cannavaro (c)
CB	4	Giorgio Chiellini	(yellow card) 49'
LB	22	Andrea Dossena	(yellow card) 81'
DM	10	Daniele De Rossi
CM	20	Riccardo Montolivo		(substituted off) 46'
CM	21	Andrea Pirlo
RW	16	Mauro Camoranesi
LW	15	Vincenzo Iaquinta		(substituted off) 38'
CF	9	Luca Toni		(substituted off) 57'
Substitutions:
FW	17	Giuseppe Rossi		(substituted on) 38'
FW	7	Simone Pepe		(substituted on) 46'
FW	11	Alberto Gilardino		(substituted on) 57'
Manager:
Marcello Lippi

GK	1	Júlio César
RB	2	Maicon
CB	3	Lúcio (c)
CB	4	Juan	(substituted off) 24'
LB	16	André Santos
DM	8	Gilberto Silva	(substituted off) 84'
CM	18	Ramires	(substituted off) 86'
CM	5	Felipe Melo
AM	10	Kaká
SS	11	Robinho
CF	9	Luís Fabiano
Substitutions:
DF	14	Luisão	(substituted on) 24'
MF	20	Kléberson	(substituted on) 84'
MF	17	Josué	(substituted on) 86'
Manager:
Dunga

Man of the Match:
Luís Fabiano (Brazil)

Assistant referees:
Marvin Torrentera (Mexico)
Héctor Vergara (Canada)
Fourth official:
Coffi Codjia (Benin)
Fifth official:
Alexis Fassinou (Benin)

=== Egypt vs United States ===
21 June 2009
20:30 SAST

Egypt	0–3	United States
	Report	Davies 21'; Bradley 63'; Dempsey 71'

Royal Bafokeng Stadium, Rustenburg
Attendance: 23,140
Referee: Michael Hester (New Zealand)

Egypt	United States

GK	1	Essam El-Hadary (c)
RB	7	Ahmed Fathy		(substituted off) 56'
CB	6	Hany Said
CB	20	Wael Gomaa
LB	15	Ahmed Samir Farag
CM	3	Ahmed Elmohamady	(yellow card) 83'
CM	11	Mohamed Shawky
CM	8	Hosny Abd Rabo
AM	22	Mohamed Aboutrika
CF	18	Ahmed Abdel-Ghani		(substituted off) 62'
CF	10	Ahmed Eid Abdel Malek		(substituted off) 50'
Substitutions:
DF	4	Ahmed Said		(substituted on) 50'
MF	17	Ahmed Hassan		(substituted on) 56'
FW	19	Mohamed Abougrisha		(substituted on) 62'
Manager:
Hassan Shehata

GK	18	Brad Guzan
RB	21	Jonathan Spector	(yellow card) 38'
CB	5	Oguchi Onyewu
CB	15	Jay DeMerit
LB	2	Jonathan Bornstein
CM	12	Michael Bradley	(yellow card) 49'
CM	13	Ricardo Clark
RW	8	Clint Dempsey
LW	10	Landon Donovan (c)
CF	17	Jozy Altidore		(substituted off) 69'
CF	9	Charlie Davies		(substituted off) 82'
Substitutions:
MF	22	Benny Feilhaber		(substituted on) 69'
FW	4	Conor Casey		(substituted on) 82'
Manager:
Bob Bradley

Man of the Match:
Clint Dempsey (United States)

Assistant referees:
Jan Hendrik-Hintz (New Zealand)
Mark Rule (New Zealand)
Fourth official:
Matthew Breeze (Australia)
Fifth official:
Matthew Cream (Australia)
