= Charlie Davies =

American former soccer player

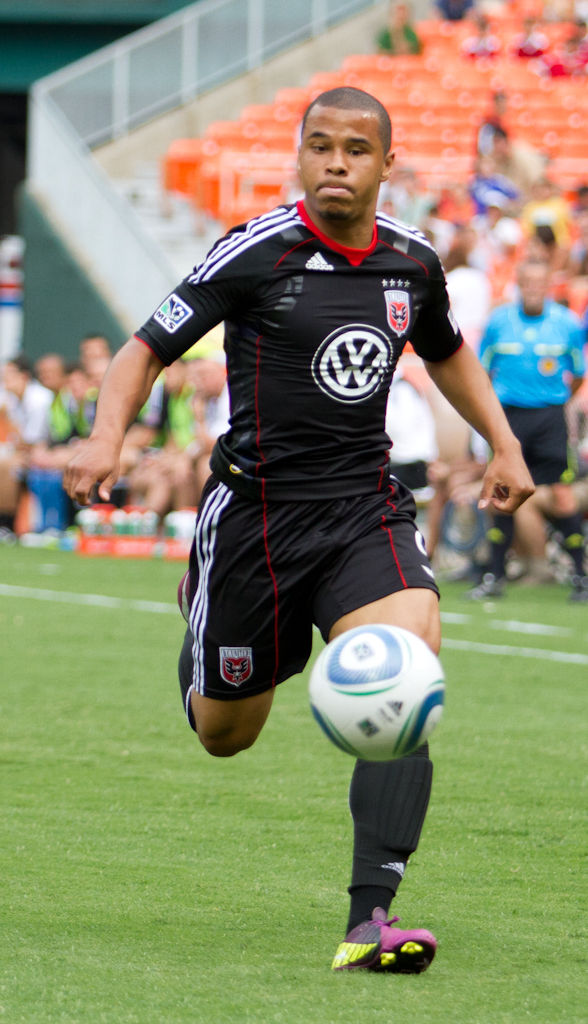
- Davies playing for D.C. United in 2011

Personal information
- Full name: Charles Desmond Davies
- Date of birth: June 25, 1986 (age 40)
- Place of birth: Manchester, New Hampshire, United States
- Height: 5 ft 10 in (1.78 m)
- Position: Forward

College career
Years	Team	Apps	(Gls)
2004–2006	Boston College Eagles	37	(24)

Senior career*
Years	Team	Apps	(Gls)
2006	Westchester Flames	9	(6)
2007–2009	Hammarby IF	56	(21)
2009–2012	Sochaux	10	(2)
2011	→ D.C. United (loan)	26	(11)
2012–2014	Randers	23	(0)
2013	→ New England Revolution (loan)	4	(0)
2014–2016	New England Revolution	60	(14)
2016–2017	Philadelphia Union	11	(0)
2017	→ Bethlehem Steel (loan)	1	(1)
Total		174	(55)

International career
2004–2005	United States U20	10	(0)
2007–2008	United States U23	6	(1)
2007–2009	United States	17	(4)
Medal record
Representing United States
FIFA Confederations Cup
Runner-up	2009 South Africa	Team
CONCACAF Gold Cup
Runner-up	CONCACAF Gold Cup	2009
Men's Soccer
- * Club domestic league appearances and goals

Charles Desmond Davies (born June 25, 1986) is an American former professional soccer player who played as a forward.

Davies set several soccer records at his high school, the Brooks School, before appearing for the Boston College Eagles and the Westchester Flames in college. Davies signed his first professional contract with Swedish Allsvenskan club Hammarby IF in December 2006 before joining Sochaux in July 2009. After joining D.C. United on loan in 2011, he signed for Randers permanently in 2012. Later, he joined New England Revolution.

Davies was capped seventeen times for the United States national team between 2007 and 2009, and scored four international goals.

On October 13, 2009, Davies was involved in a car crash on the George Washington Parkway that killed a fellow passenger and left Davies with severe injuries that kept him out of the 2010 FIFA World Cup, while also ending his international career.

== Early life ==
Born in New Hampshire, as a child Davies was encouraged to play soccer and coached by his father Kofi Davies, an immigrant from the Gambia. He attended the Brooks School in North Andover, Massachusetts and graduated in 2004 alongside fellow professional Mike Fucito. While there he set many Brooks scoring records, scoring twenty-nine and thirty goals in his junior and senior seasons, respectively. In his senior campaign, Davies led Brooks School to a 15–0 league record, and New England Class-A Championship. Davies also starred in wrestling at Brooks, a 3x New England Prep School Champion while earning National Prep All-American status his sophomore & senior seasons.

After prep school Davies attended Boston College, where he starred for the Eagles for three seasons. His sophomore season was cut short due a knee injury suffered in the first half of the season opener. During his college years he also played with Westchester Flames of the USL Premier Development League, scoring six goals in nine appearances. He was a finalist for the Hermann Trophy in 2006, capping his comeback season. He finished his college career with twenty-four goals and ten assists in thirty-seven games, including fifteen goals in sixteen games his final season. In 2004, he was an All-American selection, he also won the ACC Offensive Player of the Year and Big East Rookie of the Year honors during his tenure with the Eagles.

== Professional career ==
Rather than finishing his degree at Boston College, Davies decided to turn pro after three years of college. He was a well-established professional prospect, and was expected to be a very high MLS draft pick had he chosen to accept the Generation Adidas contract that he was offered. Ultimately, Davies decided to sign with Nike and try his luck in Europe rather than signing with Major League Soccer.

=== Hammarby ===
After an unsuccessful trial at Dutch club Ajax, Davies signed his first professional contract with Allsvenskan club Hammarby IF in December 2006. Although he initially was placed in the starting lineup, he had trouble finishing and spent his first year with the club alternating between being a starter and a substitute. On June 24, 2007, Davies netted his first goal for the club, which was the decisive goal in Hammarby's match against Faroese club Klaksvik in the first round of the 2007 Intertoto Cup, but he was still unable to score in the Allsvenskan. Davies credits both his coach, Tony Gustavsson, and Uruguayan star and former Hammarby teammate Sebastián Eguren with guiding his work ethic and attitude through his struggles. In the final match of the 2007 season Davies broke through and scored a hat-trick against GAIS.

The 2008 season was a major breakthrough for Davies. He scored fourteen goals in twenty-seven games, twenty-five of which were starts. As a result of his strong performance in 2008 there were many rumors regarding his transfer to a larger club elsewhere in Europe, but ultimately nothing materialized, and Davies returned to Hammarby.

The 2009 season began well for Davies, who scored four goals in the first nine league games. He also scored two extra time goals in a 2009 Swedish Cup match against Åtvidaberg, a ninety-ninth-minute equalizer and the winning goal just before extra time expired, to propel his club to a 3–2 victory in the third round of the tournament.

In the ninth league match of the season, however, he was issued a five match suspension after he elbowed one of his opponents, Örebro defender Michael Almebäck in the face, resulting in a bloody mouth. Davies subsequently left Sweden to join up with the U.S. national team, marking his last appearance with Hammarby.

=== Sochaux ===
On July 10, 2009, before returning from his suspension in Sweden, it was announced that Davies would sign with Ligue 1 club Sochaux. On August 15, in his second game with Sochaux, Davies came on as a second-half substitute and scored twice; Sochaux ultimately lost the game to Bordeaux, 3–2. However, after only eight appearances with the club, Davies was seriously injured in a car crash while in the United States. On April 26, 2010, Davies returned to full training with his club and was finally placed in the gameday roster for the December 19 match against Bordeaux.

After having spent 2011 on loan to D.C. United, Davies returned to Sochaux. He made his first appearance since his accident in a 1–0 loss against Rennes on February 11, 2012.

=== D.C. United ===
After a ten-day evaluation period with the club during their pre-season, Davies signed on loan with D.C. United for the 2011 MLS season. Davies made his debut as a substitute in the 52nd minute, against the Columbus Crew on March 19, 2011, scoring two goals. A week later he scored his third goal in a 2–1 loss against New England, and, as of May 4, led MLS in scoring with six goals scored. On June 24, Davies was fined $1000 for diving. On September 11, Davies scored a hat-trick off of three assists from Chris Pontius to beat Chivas USA 3–0 in California. The win put United into tenth place in the standings, the final playoff spot, just above the New York Red Bulls. United announced on December 1, 2011, that they would not exercise its December 1 option to secure his permanent transfer from Sochaux. After his loan spell at D.C. United, Davies spoke out about the club's disappointing season and said he was involved in a disagreement with the club's coaching staff.

=== Randers ===
At the end of the season, Davies was on the verge of leaving Sochaux after reaching an agreement to terminate the contract with rumors spreading that he was on his way to join AZ and American team-mate Jozy Altidore but this was denied by technical director Earnie Stewart, who insisted that the club had no interest in Davies. Eventually, Davies signed for Danish side Randers on a two-year deal. Davies made his debut for the club, coming on as a substitute, in a 1–0 win over OB on July 22, 2012. He finished his time at the club without making a start or scoring a goal.

=== New England Revolution ===
On August 8, 2013, Davies was loaned to the New England Revolution for the remainder of the 2013 MLS season. Davies made his Revolution debut, and home debut, on August 17, 2013, coming on as a 79th minute substitute for Chad Barrett in a 2-0 win over the Chicago Fire.

On January 9, 2014 Davies and Randers agreed to terminate his contract, allowing him to join New England on a permanent basis. Davies made his first start for the Revolution on July 19, 2014 in a 1-0 loss to FC Dallas. He scored his first Revolution goal on August 2 in a 2-1 loss to the New York Red Bulls.

Davies was a key part of New England's run to the MLS Cup final in 2014, scoring multiple goals against the Columbus Crew and New York Red Bulls, including the decisive goal in Leg 2 against the Red Bulls that gave New England an aggregate victory of 4–3. In the Revolution's 5 playoff matches, Davies notched a total of 4 goals and additionally recorded a game-winning assist. He was a finalist for the 2014 MLS Comeback Player of the Year award, ultimately losing out to Rodney Wallace.

In the 2015 New England Revolution season, Davies led the Revolution in scoring, winning the club's golden boot award with 10 goals and 4 assists. He was named the Midnight Riders Man of the Year.

Davies made 9 appearances for the Revolution in 2016, recording one goal, on March 6 against the Houston Dynamo in the season opener.

=== Philadelphia Union ===
Davies with the Philadelphia Union in 2017

On August 3, 2016, New England traded Davies and a third-round pick in the 2018 MLS SuperDraft to Philadelphia Union in exchange for a first-round pick in the 2018 SuperDraft, general allocation money, and targeted allocation money. He was released from the Union at the conclusion of the 2017 season.

Davies announced his retirement from professional soccer on March 2, 2018.

== International career ==
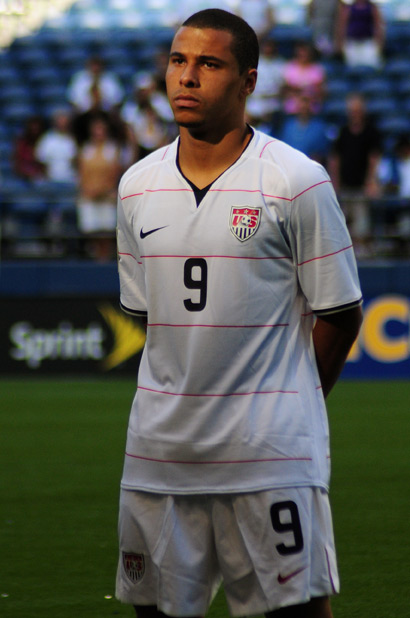
Davies lining up for the United States in 2009

=== Youth ===
Davies played ten games, mostly as a substitute, for the United States U-20 men's national soccer team, but did not make the roster for the 2005 FIFA World Youth Championship. He was the last player cut from the Youth Championship roster. However, the U-20 team would include him in the roster for the Elite Milk Cup competition a month later. He led the team to the final where he scored a hat trick, making him the MVP of the competition and giving the U.S. its first Milk Cup success. Davies next focused on the under-23 national team as his next target for international play. He later trained and played with the team, eventually making the roster for the men's tournament at the 2008 Summer Olympics. As a member of the United States men's Olympic team he made only one appearance in the three games the United States team played at the Olympics. He came on as a substitute in the team's last match against Nigeria, where he nearly tied the match when his header rang off the crossbar in the waning moments, which would have sent the team through to the knockout rounds had it gone into the net.

=== Senior ===
He made his debut for the senior national team on June 2, 2007, as a substitute in a 4–1 friendly victory over China in San Jose, California. Later that summer he was a part of the squad that took part in the 2007 Copa América in Venezuela. On October 15, 2008, he scored his first national team goal in a 2–1 loss to Trinidad and Tobago during the third round of CONCACAF qualifying for the 2010 FIFA World Cup. He added his second national team goal against Egypt in the final group stage game of the 2009 Confederations Cup. In the following game against Spain, Davies was involved in his strike partner Jozy Altidore's opening goal. On August 12, 2009, Davies scored the opening goal in a 2–1 loss to Mexico in Mexico City, becoming only the fourth American to score against Mexico in the Azteca Stadium.

On May 11, 2010, it was announced by coach Bob Bradley that Davies would not be on the preliminary national team roster for the 2010 FIFA World Cup, as Sochaux had not cleared him medically following an automobile accident a year earlier that left Davies injured.

== After retirement ==
Following his retirement, Davies became the club ambassador for New England Revolution. Since 2020, he had worked as the color analyst for Revolution games on NBC Sports Boston, 98.5 The Sports Hub and Apple TV alongside color commentator Brad Feldman. In June 2021, Davies joined CBS Sports where he works as a studio analyst for multiple games and tournaments such as CONCACAF Champions Cup. He is also a regular on CBS Sports Golazo Networks morning show Morning Footy, and works on the Call It What You Want podcast which focuses mainly on American soccer.

In July 2025, it was announced Davies was hired as a writer for The Athletic, where he would write weekly columns on the 2026 World Cup.

== Personal life ==
Davies married his wife Nina in 2012, at the Boston College campus church, they have two sons Rhys and Dakota who are twins born in 2016. He and his family reside in Hingham, Massachusetts.

Davies is involved in charity organizations in the New England area, he serves on one of the Boston Children’s Hospital boards and is a director of the Quin Impact Fund.

=== Automobile crash ===
On October 13, 2009, Davies, who was in Washington, D.C. for a 2010 FIFA World Cup qualifying game against Costa Rica, was a passenger in an SUV that lost control on the George Washington Memorial Parkway and struck a metal railing at about 3:15 a.m., tearing the vehicle in half. The crash was due to the driver being distracted while trying to plug in a GPS. The crash killed a 22-year-old woman who was in the car with Davies, while Davies himself suffered a lacerated bladder, fractured right tibia and femur, a fractured elbow, multiple facial fractures, and bleeding on the brain. In an interview with ESPN's Jeremy Schaap on December 4, Davies said that he had expected to be running by March and would be fit to play at the World Cup. On January 25, 2010, ESPNsoccernet reported Davies was jogging and hoped to return to Sochaux by April. Davies returned to France to complete his rehabilitation with his club on February 17, with plans to commence full team training within a month. He resumed minor training with the club on March 22.

Two years after the crash, Davies filed a $20 million lawsuit against Das Enterprises, which operates the Shadow Room, and Red Bull North America, which hosted the private event at which alcohol was served. The parents of the woman killed in the crash also filed suit against the nightclub owner and Red Bull in U.S. District Court in Alexandria, Virginia. Davies reached an undisclosed settlement in October 2012.

=== Cancer diagnosis ===
In July 2016, Davies was diagnosed with liposarcoma. Later that same year, he underwent a surgical procedure to remove the tumor.

== Career statistics ==
=== Club ===
Club	Season	League			National cup (Note: Includes Svenska Cupen, U.S. Open Cup, Danish Cup)		Continental		Other		Total	
Club	Season	Division	Apps	Goals	Apps	Goals	Apps	Goals	Apps	Goals	Apps	Goals
Westchester Flames	2006	USL PDL	9	6			–		–		9	6
Hammarby	2007	Allsvenskan	20	3	0	0	8 (Note: Appearances in UEFA Cup)	1	–		28	4
Hammarby	2008	Allsvenskan	27	14	4	1	–		–		31	15
Hammarby	2009	Allsvenskan	9	4	2	3	–		–		11	7
Hammarby	Total		56	21	6	4	8	1	–		70	26
Sochaux	2009–10	Ligue 1	8	2	0	0	–		–		8	2
Sochaux	2010–11	Ligue 1	0	0	0	0	–		–		0	0
Sochaux	2011–12	Ligue 1	2	0	0	0	–		–		2	0
Sochaux	Total		10	2	0	0	–		–		10	2
D.C. United (loan)	2011	MLS	26	11	1	0	–		–		27	11
Randers	2012–13	Danish Superliga	23	0	3	0	–		–		26	0
New England Revolution (loan)	2013	MLS	4	0	–		–		–		4	0
New England Revolution	2014	MLS	18	3	1	0	–		5 (Note: Appearances in MLS Cup Playoffs)	4	24	7
New England Revolution	2015	MLS	33	10	0	0	–		–		33	10
New England Revolution	2016	MLS	9	1	0	0	–		–		9	1
New England Revolution	Total		75	14	1	0	–		5	4	84	18
Philadelphia Union	2016	MLS	8	0	0	0	–		–		8	0
Philadelphia Union	2017	MLS	3	0	0	0	–		–		3	0
Philadelphia Union	Total		11	0	0	0	–		–		11	0
Bethlehem Steel (loan)	2017	USL Championship	1	1	0	0	–		–		1	1
Career total			184	62	11	4	8	1	5	4	208	71

=== International ===
International goals

#	Date	Venue	Opponent	Score	Result	Competition
01.	October 15, 2008	Hasely Crawford Stadium, Port of Spain, Trinidad and Tobago	Trinidad and Tobago	1–1	1–2	2010 FIFA World Cup qualifier
02.	June 21, 2009	Royal Bafokeng Stadium, Phokeng, South Africa	Egypt	1–0	3–0	2009 Confederations Cup
03.	July 6, 2009	Qwest Field, Seattle, United States	Grenada	4–0	4–0	2009 CONCACAF Gold Cup
04.	August 12, 2009	Estadio Azteca, Mexico City, Mexico	Mexico	1–0	1–2	2010 FIFA World Cup qualifier

== Honors ==
Individual

- ACC Offensive Player of the Year: 2006
- Midnight Riders Man of the Year: 2015
- Boston College Varsity Club Hall of Fame: 2023
