= Katlego Mashego =

South African soccer player

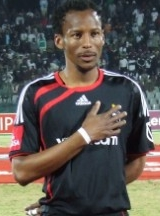
- Mashego with the Orlando Pirates in 2010

Personal information
- Full name: Katlego Evidence Mashego
- Date of birth: 18 May 1982 (age 44)
- Place of birth: Bushbuckridge, South Africa
- Height: 1.75 m (5 ft 9 in)
- Positions: Striker; midfielder

Youth career
- Tubatse Crusaders
- Jamestown FC

Senior career*
Years	Team	Apps	(Gls)
	Hellenic FC	0	(0)
2004–2006	Silver Stars	35	(8)
2006–2009	SuperSport United	60	(21)
2009–2011	Orlando Pirates	57	(15)
2011–2012	Golden Arrows	22	(4)
2012–2013	Moroka Swallows	28	(13)
2013–2016	Mamelodi Sundowns	36	(9)
2016–2018	Chippa United	23	(6)

International career^{‡}
2006–2014	South Africa	22	(2)
- * Club domestic league appearances and goals as of 08:07, 16 January 2019 (UTC) ‡ National team caps and goals as of 25 December 2013

Katlego "Mahoota" Mashego (born 18 May 1982 in Bushbuckridge, Mpumalanga) is a South African professional football (soccer) striker who most recently played for Premier Soccer League side Chippa United. He represented the South Africa national team on 22 occasions, scoring twice.

Mashego started his career at Hellenic FC and Silver Stars before moving to SuperSport United in 2006, where he won the Premier Soccer League in 2008.

He then moved to Orlando Pirates in January 2009 and captured his second league title in 2011.

Mashego was transferred from Orlando Pirates to Golden Arrows in 2011, with the player signing a 3-year deal.

He left Golden Arrows after only a single season and was signed on a free transfer by Moroka Swallows. Mashego finished the 2012-13 Premier Soccer League season as the league's top scorer with 13 goals.

Mashego joined Mamelodi Sundowns in August 2013 in a deal which saw Edward Manqele move in the opposite direction as a replacement on loan.

== International goals ==
#	Date	Venue	Opponent	Score	Result	Competition
1	2006-08-16	Windhoek, Namibia	Namibia	1–0	1–0	Friendly match
2	2013-06-12	Yaoundé, Cameroon	Central African Republic	3–0	3–0	2014 FIFA World Cup qualification
