= Benson Mhlongo =

South African soccer player

Personal information
- Full name: Benson Simphiwe Mhlongo
- Date of birth: 9 November 1980 (age 45)
- Place of birth: Alexandra, South Africa
- Height: 1.82 m (6 ft 0 in)
- Positions: Centre-back; defensive midfielder

Youth career
- Megawatt Park
- Alexandra Parma
- Supersport United

Senior career*
Years	Team	Apps	(Gls)
1998–1999	→ Alexandra United (loan)	15	(0)
1999–2000	→ City Sharks (loan)	8	(0)
2001–2005	Wits University	55	(9)
2005–2008	Mamelodi Sundowns	76	(4)
2008–2012	Orlando Pirates	41	(4)
2012–2014	Platinum Stars	49	(2)
2014–2015	Polokwane City	12	(0)

International career
2003–2009	South Africa	37	(1)
- * Club domestic league appearances and goals

Benson Mhlongo (born 9 November 1980) is a South African former professional soccer player who played as a defender and midfielder.

He was part of the South African squad at the 2008 African Cup of Nations.

During the 2026 FIFA World Cup, Mhlongo worked as a football pundit and drew media attention for his strict criticism of South Africa's national team players. Following Bafana Bafana's 1–1 group stage draw against the Czech Republic, he publicly questioned the commitment and intensity of midfielder Teboho Mokoena, stating that the player was performing at only half his capacity despite scoring the equalizing penalty.

== Coaching career ==
Following his retirement in 2016, joined the Orlando Pirates technical team before becoming head coach of TS Sporting.

== Personal life ==
Mhlongo was married to Pretty Mhlongo. She died in May 2023.

== International goals ==
#	Date	Venue	Opponent	Score	Result	Competition
1	20 May 2006	Gaborone, Botswana	Swaziland	1–0	1–0	COSAFA Cup
