= Royal Bafokeng Stadium =

Sports venue in Phokeng, South Africa

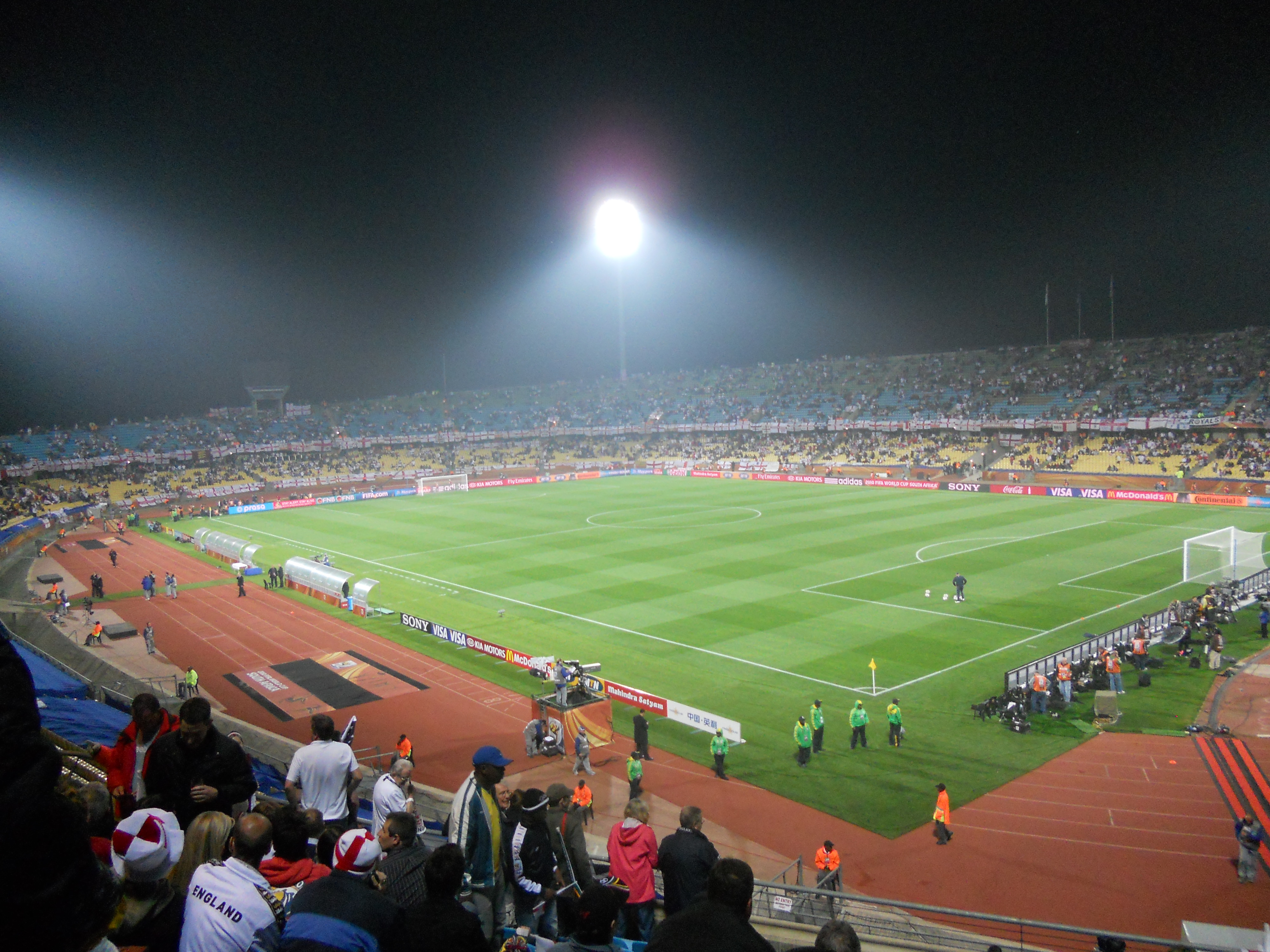
- Interactive map of Royal Bafokeng Stadium
- Full name: Royal Bafokeng Sports Palace
- Address: South Africa
- Location: R565 (Sun City Road), Phokeng, South Africa
- Coordinates: 25°34′43″S 27°09′39″E
- Owner: Royal Bafokeng Nation
- Capacity: 44,530
- Surface: GrassMaster

Construction
- Groundbreaking: 1995
- Built: 1996-1998
- Opened: 1999
- Renovated: 2007-2009
- Expanded: 2009

Tenants
- Marumo Gallants (2026-); Platinum Stars F.C. (2006–2018)

The Royal Bafokeng Sports Palace is a soccer, rugby and athletics stadium in Phokeng near Rustenburg, South Africa. It was built and is managed by the Royal Bafokeng Nation. It was used as the home stadium for Premiership club Platinum Stars, and is used, from 2026, by Marumo Gallants, who relocated there from Bloemfontein. The Leopards rugby team host large attendance matches during the Currie Cup at the stadium, instead of their usual home ground, Olën Park.

The capacity of the stadium was increased from 38,000 to 44,530 to be able to host five first-round matches and one second-round match at the 2010 FIFA World Cup.

For the 2010 tournament, the main west stand was upgraded and enlarged and given a new cantilever roof. Other improvements include the installation of new electronic scoreboards, new seats, and upgraded floodlights and public address system.

The stadium upgrade was completed in March 2009 for hosting 4 matches of the 2009 FIFA Confederations Cup.

== Sporting and Miscellaneous events ==
=== 2009 FIFA Confederations Cup ===
Royal Bafokeng Stadium was one of the host venues for the 2009 FIFA Confederations Cup.

Date	Time (UTC+2)	Team No. 1	Result	Team No. 2	Round	Attendance
14 June 2009	20:30	New Zealand	0–5	Spain	Group A	21,649
17 June 2009	20.30	South Africa	2–0	New Zealand	Group A	36,598
21 June 2009	20:30	Egypt	0–3	United States	Group B	23,140
28 June 2009	15:00	Spain	3–2	South Africa	3rd/4th Place Play-off	31,788

=== 2010 FIFA World Cup ===
In the World Cup, the stadium hosted five first round matches and one second round match and was the second smallest stadium for the tournament.

=== Matches ===
Date	Time (UTC+2)	Team No. 1	Result	Team No. 2	Round	Attendance
12 June 2010	20:30	England	1–1	United States	Group C	38,646
15 June 2010	13:30	New Zealand	1–1	Slovakia	Group F	23,871
19 June 2010	16:00	Ghana	1–1	Australia	Group D	34,812
22 June 2010	16:00	Mexico	0–1	Uruguay	Group A	33,425
24 June 2010	20:30	Denmark	1–3	Japan	Group E	27,967
26 June 2010	20:30	United States	1–2	Ghana	Round of 16	34,976

=== 2013 Africa Cup of Nations ===
Royal Bafokeng Stadium served as one of the host venues for the 2013 Africa Cup of Nations.

Date	Time (UTC+2)	Team No. 1	Result	Team No. 2	Round	Attendance
22 January 2013	17:00	Ivory Coast	2–1	Togo	Group D	2,000
22 January 2013	20:00	Tunisia	1–0	Algeria	Group D	8,000
26 January 2013	17:00	Ivory Coast	3–0	Tunisia	Group D	20,000
26 January 2013	20:00	Algeria	0–2	Togo	Group D	35,000
29 January 2013	20:00	Ethiopia	0–2	Nigeria	Group C	15,000
30 January 2013	20:00	Algeria	2–2	Ivory Coast	Group D	5,000
3 February 2013	17:00	Ivory Coast	1–2	Nigeria	Quarter-finals	25,000

=== 2019 Fill Up Royal Bafokeng ===
In 2019, South African star Cassper Nyovest announced that his annual one man show "Fill Up" will be heading to North West and Royal Bafokeng Stadium will be hosting his concert named Fill Up Royal Bafokeng

On the 15th of December 2019, Cassper Nyovest held his 5th concert at Royal Bafokeng with a capacity of over 40,000

== See also ==
- List of stadiums in South Africa
