= Coffi Codjia =

Beninese football referee (born 1967)

- Full name: Bonaventure Coffi Codjia
- Born: 9 December 1967 (age 58); Benin

International
Years	League	Role
1994–2011	FIFA-listed	Referee

Bonaventure Coffi Codjia (born 9 December 1967) is a Beninese retired football referee who was listed on the FIFA International Referees List between 1994 and 2011.

An international referee since 1994, Codjia was a referee at the FIFA World Cup in 2002 and 2006; the FIFA Confederations Cup in 1999 and 2003; and the African Cup of Nations in 2000, 2002, 2004, 2006, 2008, in which he was the referee for the final, and 2010.

Codjia was indefinitely suspended by the Confederation of African Football (CAF) for not taking action against Algeria's Faouzi Chaouchi, who appeared to head-butt him in a semi-final of the 2010 African Cup of Nations semi-final game against Egypt. Chaouchi, who was later sent off for a second bookable offence, received a three-match ban by CAF for the headbutt.

Codjia was one of the 38 preselected referees for the 2010 FIFA World Cup, but did not make the final list of 30. He returned to international officiating duty in September 2010, refereeing a 2012 Africa Cup of Nations qualifying game between Liberia and Zimbabwe in Monrovia.

In 2013, journalist Sabin Loumèdjinon released a book titled Coffi Codjia: Un sifflet en Or (in French: Coffi Codjia, a Golden Whistle) to honour his career as a respected and internationally recognised referee from Africa. The event was attended by Codjia himself and had the preface written by French engineer Gerard Dreyfus. The contents of the book include testimonies on Codjia from high-stakes African players like Roger Milla, Abdoulaye Traoré, Anthony Baffoe, and Ibrahim Keita.
