= 1995 King Fahd Cup squads =

Below are the rosters for the 1995 King Fahd Cup tournament in Saudi Arabia.

== Group A ==
=== Denmark ===
Head coach: Richard Møller Nielsen

| No. | Pos. | Player | Date of birth (age) | Caps | Club |
|---|---|---|---|---|---|
| 1 | GK | Peter Kjær | 5 November 1965 (aged 29) | 0 | (Denmark) Silkeborg |
| 2 | DF | Jakob Friis-Hansen | 6 March 1967 (aged 27) | 13 | (France) Lille |
| 3 | DF | Marc Rieper | 5 June 1968 (aged 26) | 24 | (England) West Ham United |
| 4 | DF | Jes Høgh | 7 May 1966 (aged 28) | 9 | (Denmark) AaB |
| 5 | DF | Jens Risager | 9 April 1971 (aged 23) | 2 | (Denmark) Brøndby |
| 6 | DF | Michael Schjønberg | 19 January 1967 (aged 27) | 0 | (Denmark) Odense |
| 7 | MF | Brian Steen Nielsen | 28 December 1968 (aged 26) | 21 | (Turkey) Fenerbahçe |
| 8 | MF | Johnny Hansen | 11 July 1966 (aged 28) | 2 | (Denmark) Odense |
| 9 | FW | Mark Strudal | 29 April 1968 (aged 26) | 8 | (Denmark) Brøndby |
| 10 | MF | Michael Laudrup (Captain) | 15 June 1964 (aged 30) | 76 | (Spain) Real Madrid |
| 11 | FW | Brian Laudrup | 22 February 1969 (aged 25) | 52 | (Scotland) Rangers |
| 12 | DF | Jacob Laursen | 6 October 1971 (aged 23) | 0 | (Denmark) Silkeborg |
| 13 | MF | Jesper Kristensen | 9 October 1971 (aged 23) | 1 | (Denmark) Brøndby |
| 14 | MF | Morten Wieghorst | 25 February 1971 (aged 23) | 1 | (Scotland) Dundee |
| 15 | DF | Carsten Hemmingsen | 18 December 1970 (aged 24) | 0 | (Denmark) Odense |
| 16 | GK | Lars Høgh | 14 January 1959 (aged 35) | 6 | (Denmark) Odense |
| 17 | FW | Peter Rasmussen | 16 May 1967 (aged 27) | 1 | (Denmark) AaB |
| 18 | FW | Bo Hansen | 16 June 1972 (aged 22) | 0 | (Denmark) Brøndby |
| 20 | GK | Mogens Krogh | 31 October 1963 (aged 31) | 2 | (Denmark) Brøndby |

=== Mexico ===
Head coach: Miguel Mejía Barón

| No. | Pos. | Player | Date of birth (age) | Caps | Club |
|---|---|---|---|---|---|
| 1 | GK | Jorge Campos | 15 October 1966 (aged 28) | | (Mexico) Pumas UNAM |
| 2 | DF | Claudio Suárez | 17 December 1968 (aged 26) | | (Mexico) Pumas UNAM |
| 4 | MF | Ignacio Ambríz (c) | 7 February 1965 (aged 29) | | (Mexico) Club Necaxa |
| 5 | MF | Jesús Ramón Ramírez | 5 December 1969 (aged 25) | | (Mexico) Guadalajara |
| 6 | MF | Marcelino Bernal | 27 May 1962 (aged 32) | | (Mexico) Toluca |
| 7 | FW | Carlos Hermosillo | 24 August 1964 (aged 30) | | (Mexico) Cruz Azul |
| 8 | MF | Alberto García Aspe | 11 May 1967 (aged 27) | | (Mexico) Club Necaxa |
| 9 | MF | Jorge Rodríguez | 18 April 1968 (aged 26) | | (Mexico) Santos Laguna |
| 10 | MF | Luis García Postigo | 1 June 1969 (aged 25) | | (Mexico) Club América |
| 11 | FW | Zague | 23 May 1967 (aged 27) | | (Mexico) Club América |
| 12 | GK | Adrián Chávez | 27 June 1962 (aged 32) | | (Mexico) Club América |
| 13 | DF | Manuel Vidrio | 23 August 1972 (aged 22) | | (Mexico) Guadalajara |
| 14 | MF | Joaquín del Olmo | 20 April 1969 (aged 25) | | (Mexico) Club América |
| 15 | MF | Gerardo Esquivel | 13 January 1966 (aged 28) | | (Mexico) Club Necaxa |
| 16 | MF | Alberto Coyote | 26 March 1967 (aged 27) | | (Mexico) Guadalajara |
| 17 | MF | Benjamín Galindo | 11 December 1960 (aged 34) | | (Mexico) Santos Laguna |
| 18 | FW | Cuauhtémoc Blanco | 17 January 1973 (aged 21) | | (Mexico) Club América |
| 20 | GK | Nicolás Navarro | 17 September 1963 (aged 31) | | (Mexico) Club Necaxa |
| 21 | DF | Raúl Gutiérrez | 16 October 1966 (aged 28) | | (Mexico) Club América |

=== Saudi Arabia ===
Head coach: Mohammed Al-Kharashy

| No. | Pos. | Player | Date of birth (age) | Caps | Club |
|---|---|---|---|---|---|
| 1 | GK | Mohamed Al-Deayea | 2 August 1972 (aged 22) | | (Saudi Arabia) Al-Tai |
| 2 | DF | Ramzi Al-Muwallad | | | (Saudi Arabia) |
| 3 | DF | Mohammed Al-Khilaiwi | 24 May 1971 (aged 23) | | (Saudi Arabia) Al-Ittihad |
| 4 | DF | Abdullah Zubromawi | 15 November 1973 (aged 21) | | (Saudi Arabia) Al-Ahli |
| 5 | DF | Ahmed Jamil Madani | 6 January 1970 (aged 25) | | (Saudi Arabia) Al-Ittihad |
| 6 | MF | Fuad Anwar Amin | 13 October 1972 (aged 22) | | (Saudi Arabia) Al-Shabab |
| 7 | MF | Fahad Al-Ghesheyan | 11 August 1973 (aged 21) | | (Saudi Arabia) Al-Hilal |
| 8 | MF | Saleh Al-Saleh | 3 January 1966 (aged 29) | | (Saudi Arabia) |
| 9 | FW | Sami Al-Jaber | 11 December 1972 (aged 22) | | (Saudi Arabia) Al-Hilal |
| 10 | MF | Saeed Al-Owairan | 19 August 1967 (aged 27) | | (Saudi Arabia) Al-Shabab |
| 11 | FW | Fahad Al-Mehallel | 11 November 1970 (aged 24) | | (Saudi Arabia) Al-Hilal |
| 12 | MF | Ahmed Eesa | | | (Saudi Arabia) |
| 13 | GK | Turki Awad | | | (Saudi Arabia) Al-Hilal |
| 14 | MF | Khaled Al-Muwallid | 23 November 1971 (aged 23) | | (Saudi Arabia) Al-Ahli |
| 15 | DF | Saleh Al-Dawod | 24 September 1968 (aged 26) | | (Saudi Arabia) Al-Shabab |
| 16 | FW | Hussain Korshi | | | (Saudi Arabia) Al-Nassr |
| 17 | FW | Obeid Al-Dosari | 2 October 1975 (aged 19) | | (Saudi Arabia) Al-Wehda |
| 18 | MF | Salem Al-Alawi | 21 August 1972 (aged 22) | | (Saudi Arabia) Al-Shabab |
| 19 | GK | Hussein Al-Sadiq | 15 October 1973 (aged 21) | | (Saudi Arabia) Al-Qadsiah |
| 20 | MF | Hamzah Saleh | 19 April 1969 (aged 25) | | (Saudi Arabia) Al-Ahli |

== Group B ==
=== Argentina ===
Head coach: Daniel Passarella

| No. | Pos. | Player | Date of birth (age) | Caps | Club |
|---|---|---|---|---|---|
| 1 | GK | Carlos Bossio | 1 December 1973 (aged 21) | | (Argentina) Estudiantes |
| 2 | DF | Roberto Ayala | 14 April 1973 (aged 21) | | (Argentina) River Plate |
| 3 | DF | José Chamot | 17 May 1969 (aged 25) | | (Italy) Lazio |
| 4 | DF | Javier Zanetti | 10 August 1973 (aged 21) | | (Argentina) Banfield |
| 5 | MF | Hugo Pérez | 6 October 1968 (aged 26) | | (Argentina) Independiente |
| 6 | DF | Néstor Fabbri | 29 April 1968 (aged 26) | | (Argentina) Boca Juniors |
| 7 | MF | Ariel Ortega | 4 March 1974 (aged 20) | | (Argentina) River Plate |
| 8 | MF | Marcelo Escudero | 25 July 1972 (aged 22) | | (Argentina) Newell's Old Boys |
| 9 | FW | Gabriel Batistuta | 1 February 1969 (aged 25) | | (Italy) Fiorentina |
| 10 | MF | Marcelo Espina (c) | 28 April 1967 (aged 27) | | (Argentina) Platense |
| 11 | FW | Sebastián Rambert | 30 January 1974 (aged 20) | | (Argentina) Independiente |
| 12 | GK | Germán Burgos | 16 April 1969 (aged 25) | | (Argentina) River Plate |
| 13 | DF | Pablo Rotchen | 23 April 1973 (aged 21) | | (Argentina) Independiente |
| 14 | DF | Rodolfo Arruabarrena | 20 July 1975 (aged 19) | | (Argentina) Boca Juniors |
| 15 | DF | Nelson Vivas | 18 October 1969 (aged 25) | | (Argentina) Boca Juniors |
| 16 | MF | Jorge Jiménez | 4 July 1970 (aged 24) | | (Argentina) Banfield |
| 17 | MF | Marcelo Gallardo | 18 January 1976 (aged 18) | | (Argentina) River Plate |
| 18 | MF | Gustavo López | 13 April 1973 (aged 21) | | (Argentina) Independiente |
| 19 | FW | Hernán Crespo | 5 July 1975 (aged 19) | | (Argentina) River Plate |
| 20 | MF | Christian Bassedas | 16 February 1973 (aged 21) | | (Argentina) Vélez Sarsfield |

=== Japan ===
Head coach: Shu Kamo

| No. | Pos. | Player | Date of birth (age) | Caps | Club |
|---|---|---|---|---|---|
| 1 | GK | Shigetatsu Matsunaga | 12 August 1962 (aged 32) | | (Japan) Yokohama Marinos |
| 2 | DF | Yoshihiro Natsuka | 7 October 1969 (aged 25) | | (Japan) Bellmare Hiratsuka |
| 3 | DF | Satoshi Tsunami | 14 August 1961 (aged 33) | | (Japan) Verdy Kawasaki |
| 4 | DF | Masami Ihara | 18 September 1967 (aged 27) | | (Japan) Yokohama Marinos |
| 5 | MF | Tetsuji Hashiratani (c) | 15 July 1964 (aged 30) | | (Japan) Verdy Kawasaki |
| 6 | MF | Hajime Moriyasu | 23 August 1968 (aged 26) | | (Japan) Sanfrecce Hiroshima |
| 7 | DF | Takumi Horiike | 6 September 1965 (aged 29) | | (Japan) Shimizu S-Pulse |
| 8 | MF | Tsuyoshi Kitazawa | 10 August 1968 (aged 26) | | (Japan) Verdy Kawasaki |
| 9 | FW | Toshihiro Yamaguchi | 19 November 1971 (aged 23) | | (Japan) Gamba Osaka |
| 10 | MF | Ruy Ramos | 9 February 1957 (aged 37) | | (Japan) Verdy Kawasaki |
| 11 | FW | Kazuyoshi Miura | 26 February 1967 (aged 27) | | (Japan) Verdy Kawasaki |
| 12 | GK | Shinkichi Kikuchi | 12 April 1967 (aged 27) | | (Japan) Verdy Kawasaki |
| 13 | FW | Kenta Hasegawa | 25 September 1965 (aged 29) | | (Japan) Shimizu S-Pulse |
| 14 | MF | Hiromitsu Isogai | 19 April 1969 (aged 25) | | (Japan) Gamba Osaka |
| 15 | MF | Motohiro Yamaguchi | 29 January 1969 (aged 25) | | (Japan) Yokohama Flügels |
| 16 | FW | Masahiro Fukuda | 27 December 1966 (aged 28) | | (Japan) Urawa Red Diamonds |
| 17 | DF | Naoki Soma | 19 July 1971 (aged 23) | | (Japan) Kashima Antlers |
| 18 | MF | Hiroshige Yanagimoto | 15 October 1972 (aged 22) | | (Japan) Sanfrecce Hiroshima |
| 19 | FW | Masayuki Okano | 25 July 1972 (aged 22) | | (Japan) Urawa Red Diamonds |
| 20 | GK | Nobuyuki Kojima | 17 January 1966 (aged 28) | | (Japan) Bellmare Hiratsuka |

=== Nigeria ===
Head coach: Shuaibu Amodu

| No. | Pos. | Player | Date of birth (age) | Caps | Club |
|---|---|---|---|---|---|
| 1 | GK | Peter Rufai | 24 August 1963 (aged 31) | | (Portugal) Farense |
| 2 | DF | Augustine Eguavoen | 19 August 1965 (aged 29) | | (Belgium) Kortrijk |
| 3 | DF | Benedict Iroha | 29 November 1969 (aged 25) | | (Netherlands) Vitesse Arnhem |
| 4 | DF | Stephen Keshi (c) | 23 January 1962 (aged 32) | | (United States) CCV Hydra |
| 5 | DF | Uche Okechukwu | 4 November 1967 (aged 27) | | (Turkey) Fenerbahçe |
| 6 | MF | Momodu Mutairu | 2 September 1976 (aged 18) | | (Nigeria) Julius Berger FC |
| 7 | MF | Barnabas Imenger | 15 May 1975 (aged 19) | | (Nigeria) Lobi Stars |
| 8 | MF | Mutiu Adepoju | 22 December 1970 (aged 24) | | (Spain) Racing Santander |
| 9 | FW | Dominic Iorfa | 1 October 1968 (aged 26) | | (England) Southend United |
| 10 | MF | Jay-Jay Okocha | 14 August 1973 (aged 21) | | (Germany) Eintracht Frankfurt |
| 11 | FW | Emmanuel Amunike | 25 December 1970 (aged 24) | | (Portugal) Sporting CP |
| 12 | FW | Samson Siasia | 14 August 1967 (aged 27) | | (France) Nantes |
| 13 | MF | Sunday Oliseh | 14 September 1974 (aged 20) | | (Italy) Reggiana |
| 14 | FW | Daniel Amokachi | 30 December 1972 (aged 22) | | (England) Everton |
| 15 | MF | Bolaji Douglas | 12 June 1968 (aged 26) | | (Nigeria) BCC Lions FC Gboko |
| 16 | GK | Ike Shorunmu | 16 October 1967 (aged 27) | | (Nigeria) Shooting Stars |
| 17 | DF | Samuel Pam | 1 August 1968 (aged 26) | | (Nigeria) Shooting Stars |
| 18 | FW | Efan Ekoku | 8 June 1967 (aged 27) | | (England) Wimbledon |
| 19 | DF | Michael Emenalo | 14 July 1965 (aged 29) | | (England) Notts County |
| 20 | DF | Uche Okafor | 8 August 1967 (aged 27) | | (Portugal) União de Leiria |

== Sources ==
- (in Danish) Slutrundetrupper 1908-2004 at Danish Football Association
