= 1995 King Fahd Cup Group A =

Group A of the 1995 King Fahd Cup took place between 6 and 10 January 1995. Denmark won the group, and advanced to the final, while Mexico finished second and advanced to third-place playoff. Saudi Arabia failed to advance.

== Standings ==
Team	Pld	W	D	L	GF	GA	GD	Pts
Denmark	2	1	1	0	3	1	+2	4
Mexico	2	1	1	0	3	1	+2	4
Saudi Arabia	2	0	0	2	0	4	−4	0

== Results ==
=== Saudi Arabia v Mexico ===
6 January 1995
18:15 AST

Saudi Arabia	0–2	Mexico
	Report	L. García 65', 82'

King Fahd II Stadium, Riyadh
Attendance: 25,000
Referee: Salvador Imperatore (Chile)

Saudi Arabia	Mexico

SAUDI ARABIA:
GK	19	Hussein Al-Sadiq
DF	3	Mohammed Al-Khilaiwi
DF	4	Abdullah Zubromawi	(yellow card) 20'
DF	5	Ahmed Jamil Madani
DF	15	Saleh Al-Dawod		(substituted off) 68'
MF	6	Fuad Amin		(substituted off) 62'
MF	8	Saleh Al-Saleh
MF	12	Ahmed Eesa
MF	14	Khaled Al-Muwallid
FW	9	Sami Al-Jaber
FW	10	Saeed Al-Owairan
Substitutions:
MF	20	Hamzah Saleh		(substituted in) 60'
FW	11	Fahad Al-Mehallel		(substituted in) 68'
Manager:
Mohammed Al-Kharashy

MEXICO:
GK	1	Jorge Campos
DF	2	Claudio Suárez	(yellow card) 81'
DF	4	Ignacio Ambríz	(yellow card) 89'
DF	21	Raúl Gutiérrez
MF	5	Ramón Ramírez
MF	6	Marcelino Bernal
MF	8	Alberto García Aspe
MF	9	Jorge Rodríguez
MF	14	Joaquín del Olmo
FW	7	Carlos Hermosillo		(substituted off) 46'
FW	11	Zague
Substitutions:
FW	10	Luis García		(substituted in) 46'
Manager:
Miguel Mejía Barón

=== Saudi Arabia v Denmark ===
8 January 1995
18:15 AST

Saudi Arabia	0–2	Denmark
	Report	B.Laudrup 43'; Wieghorst 90'

King Fahd II Stadium, Riyadh
Attendance: 10,000
Referee: Lim Kee Chong (Mauritius)

Saudi Arabia	Denmark

SAUDI ARABIA:
GK	19	Hussein Al-Sadiq
DF	3	Mohammed Al-Khilaiwi
DF	4	Abdullah Zubromawi
DF	5	Ahmed Jamil Madani
MF	6	Fuad Amin
MF	7	Fahad Al-Ghesheyan	(yellow card) 59'
MF	8	Saleh Al-Saleh
MF	10	Saeed Al-Owairan
MF	12	Ahmed Eesa
FW	9	Sami Al-Jaber		(substituted off) 87'
FW	11	Fahad Al-Mehallel		(substituted off) 46'
Substitutions:
FW	16	Hussain Korshi		(substituted in) 46'
FW	17	Obeid Al-Dosari		(substituted in) 87'
Manager:
Mohammed Al-Kharashy

DENMARK:
GK	16	Lars Høgh
DF	3	Marc Rieper	(yellow card) 89'
DF	4	Jes Høgh
DF	5	Jens Risager
DF	12	Jacob Laursen
MF	6	Michael Schjønberg
MF	7	Brian Steen Nielsen
MF	13	Jesper Kristensen
FW	9	Mark Strudal		(substituted off) 46'
FW	11	Brian Laudrup
FW	17	Peter Rasmussen		(substituted off) 78'
Substitutions:
FW	18	Bo Hansen		(substituted in) 46'
MF	14	Morten Wieghorst		(substituted in) 78'
Manager:
Richard Møller Nielsen

=== Denmark v Mexico ===
10 January 1995
18:15 AST

Denmark	1–1 (a.e.t.)	Mexico
Rasmussen 48'	Report	L. García 25'
Penalties
Schjønberg (penalty scored); M. Laudrup (penalty scored); J. Høgh (penalty scored); Rieper (penalty scored)	4–2	(penalty scored) Suárez; (penalty missed) Bernal; (penalty scored) del Olmo; (penalty missed) L. García

King Fahd II Stadium, Riyadh
Attendance: 20,000
Referee: Salvador Imperatore (Chile)

Denmark	Mexico

DENMARK:
GK	16	Lars Høgh		(substituted off) 28'
DF	2	Jakob Friis-Hansen	(yellow card) 39'
DF	3	Marc Rieper
DF	4	Jes Høgh	(yellow card) 3'
DF	5	Jens Risager
MF	7	Brian Steen Nielsen
MF	10	Michael Laudrup
MF	13	Jesper Kristensen
MF	15	Carsten Hemmingsen		(substituted off) 46'
FW	11	Brian Laudrup
FW	17	Peter Rasmussen
Substitutions:
GK	20	Mogens Krogh		(substituted in) 28'
DF	12	Jacob Laursen		(substituted in) 46'
Manager:
Richard Møller Nielsen

MEXICO:
GK	1	Jorge Campos
DF	2	Claudio Suárez
DF	4	Ignacio Ambríz
DF	21	Raúl Gutiérrez
MF	5	Ramón Ramírez
MF	6	Marcelino Bernal	(yellow card) 11'
MF	8	Alberto García Aspe	(yellow card) 47'
MF	9	Jorge Rodríguez
MF	14	Joaquín del Olmo	(yellow card) 72'
FW	10	Luis García
FW	11	Zague		(substituted off) 70'
Substitutions:
MF	16	Alberto Coyote		(substituted in) 70'
Manager:
Miguel Mejía Barón
