= 1995 King Fahd Cup final =

- Event: 1995 King Fahd Cup
Denmark	Argentina
(Denmark)	(Argentina)
2	0
- Date: 13 January 1995
- Venue: King Fahd II Stadium, Riyadh
- Referee: Ali Bujsaim (United Arab Emirates)
- Attendance: 35,000

The 1995 King Fahd Cup final was a football match to determine the winners of the 1995 King Fahd Cup. The match was held at King Fahd II Stadium, Riyadh, Saudi Arabia, on 13 January 1995 and was contested by Denmark and Argentina. Denmark won the match 2–0.

== Match details ==
13 January 1995
20:15 AST

Denmark	2–0	Argentina
M. Laudrup 8' (pen.); Rasmussen 75'	Report

King Fahd II Stadium, Riyadh
Attendance: 35,000
Referee: Ali Bujsaim (United Arab Emirates)

Denmark	Argentina

GK	20	Mogens Krogh
RB	2	Jakob Friis-Hansen
CB	4	Jes Høgh	(yellow card) 75'
CB	3	Marc Rieper
LB	12	Jacob Laursen		(substituted off) 61'
DM	7	Brian Steen Nielsen
RM	13	Jesper Kristensen	(yellow card) 41'
LM	6	Michael Schjønberg
AM	10	Michael Laudrup		(substituted off) 26'
SS	11	Brian Laudrup
CF	17	Peter Rasmussen
Substitutions:
MF	14	Morten Wieghorst		(substituted on) 26'
DF	5	Jens Risager		(substituted on) 61'
Manager:
Richard Møller Nielsen

GK	1	Carlos Bossio
RB	4	Javier Zanetti	(yellow card) 30'
CB	2	Roberto Ayala
CB	6	Néstor Fabbri	(yellow card) 60'
LB	3	José Chamot	(yellow card) 35' (red card) 88'
DM	20	Christian Bassedas
RM	7	Ariel Ortega
CM	16	Jorge Jiménez		(substituted off) 65'
LM	8	Marcelo Escudero
CF	9	Gabriel Batistuta
CF	11	Sebastián Rambert		(substituted off) 75'
Substitutions:
MF	18	Gustavo López		(substituted on) 65'
MF	10	Marcelo Espina		(substituted on) 75'
Manager:
Daniel Passarella

Assistant referees:
Mohammad Fanaei (Iran)
Mohamed Mansri (Tunisia)
