= List of FIFA Confederations Cup winning managers =

Sports recognition of excellence

The list of FIFA Confederations Cup winning managers includes winning managers over the years in the different competitions (or Cups) held by FIFA. The FIFA Confederations Cup was an international association football tournament for men's national teams, held every four years.

== Winning managers ==
Tournament	Winning manager	Nationality	Winning national team	Ref.
1992	Alfio Basile	Argentina	Argentina	
1995	Richard Møller Nielsen	Denmark	Denmark	
1997	Mário Zagallo	Brazil	Brazil	
1999	Manuel Lapuente	Mexico	Mexico	
2001	Roger Lemerre	France	France	
2003	Jacques Santini	France	France	
2005	Carlos Alberto Parreira	Brazil	Brazil	
2009	Dunga	Brazil	Brazil	
2013	Luiz Felipe Scolari	Brazil	Brazil	
2017	Joachim Löw	Germany	Germany	
