= Barnabas Imenger =

Barnabas Imenger is the name of:

- Barnabas Imenger, footballer (1975–2021), Nigerian football midfielder
- Barnabas Imenger, footballer (born 1991), Nigerian football forward, son of the footballer born 1975
