= Mads Rieper =

Danish footballer (born 1973)

Personal information
- Full name: Mads Rieper Jensen
- Date of birth: 20 July 1973 (age 53)
- Place of birth: Aarhus, Denmark
- Height: 1.90 m (6 ft 3 in)
- Position: Defender

Senior career*
Years	Team	Apps	(Gls)
1991–2003	AGF	153	(7)
2003–2009	AC Horsens	107	(3)

Managerial career
- 2011: AC Horsens (assistant)
- * Club domestic league appearances and goals

Mads Rieper Jensen (born 20 July 1973) is a Danish former professional football defender. He is the younger brother of the retired Danish international defender Marc Rieper.

On 9 May 2007 Rieper scored his first Superliga goal for AC Horsens with a stoppage time equaliser against Silkeborg IF. He retired on 30 June 2009.

== Honours ==
- Danish Cup:
  - Winner: 1995–96 (with AGF)
- Danish 1st Division:
  - Runner-up: 2004–05 (with Horsens)
