= Brian Steen Nielsen =

Danish footballer (born 1968)

Personal information
- Full name: Brian Steen Nielsen
- Date of birth: 28 December 1968 (age 57)
- Place of birth: Vejle, Denmark
- Height: 1.80 m (5 ft 11 in)
- Position: Defensive midfielder

Youth career
- Vejle

Senior career*
Years	Team	Apps	(Gls)
1988–1992	Vejle	92	(2)
1992–1993	OB	44	(6)
1993–1995	Fenerbahçe	50	(4)
1995–1996	OB	29	(2)
1996	Urawa Red Diamonds	6	(0)
1997–1998	OB	41	(1)
1998–2001	AB	84	(10)
2001–2002	Malmö FF	29	(0)
2002–2004	AGF	65	(5)
Total		440	(30)

International career
1990–2002	Denmark	66	(3)

Managerial career
- 2005: AGF (caretaker)
Medal record
Men's football
Representing Denmark
FIFA Confederations Cup
Winner	1995 Saudi Arabia
CONMEBOL–UEFA Cup of Champions
Runner-up	1993 Argentina
- * Club domestic league appearances and goals

Brian Steen Nielsen (born 28 December 1968) is a Danish former professional footballer who played as a defensive midfielder. During his 16-year professional career, he had three stints at Odense Boldklub, and also played abroad for football clubs in Turkey, Japan and Sweden.

Steen Nielsen also made 66 appearances for the Denmark national team between 1990 and 2002, scoring three goals. After his retirement from his active career, he worked as the director of football at former club AGF until 2014.

== Career ==
Born in Vejle, Steen Nielsen started his senior career at Vejle Boldklub (VB) in October 1988. He received the 1989 Danish U21 Player of the Year award, and on 14 February 1990 he debuted for the Denmark national team. He came on as a half-time substitute in a friendly match 0–0 draw with Egypt, but he did not become a constant part of the team, playing three further games until June 1991. He switched from Vejle to rival team Odense Boldklub (OB) in 1992, where he won the 1993 Danish Cup trophy. After a year at OB, he made the jump abroad to play in Turkey for Fenerbahçe.

The move to Fenerbahçe saw him return to the Danish national team in 1993, and during the last years of coach Richard Møller Nielsen's reign, Brian Steen was a part of the defensive midfield, playing many games alongside John "Faxe" Jensen. He moved back to play for OB in 1995, who he represented when he competed for Denmark in the UEFA Euro 1996. After the championship, he moved to Japan to play for Urawa Red Diamonds, and following Møller Nielsen's retirement as Denmark coach in June 1996, Brian Steen was eventually dropped by new coach Bo Johansson.

He moved back to OB once more in 1997, before playing for Akademisk Boldklub (AB), where his experience made him the natural team captain. His time at AB culminated in the 1999 Danish Cup triumph, at which time he had returned to the national team where he played a number of games in a midfield pairing with hard-hitter Stig Tøfting. Following the emergence of the eight-year younger Thomas Gravesen on the national team, Brian Steen slowly took on the role of substitute following the UEFA Euro 2000. After 11 minutes of play in the 2002 FIFA World Cup, under new coach Morten Olsen, his national team career had come to an end.

He ended his club career in Denmark with AGF, playing his last years alongside Stig Tøfting, though his stay at the club would be marked by him head-butting teammate Nikolaj Hust at the club training. He was not sued by Hust, but the press got hold of the news and Brian Steen was charged by the police and was convicted of mild violence, resulting in ten £50 fines. He stopped his career at Aarhus GF in the fall of 2004, but stayed around the club, both as a caretaker manager and he was the sports director but stopped in 2014.

== Outside of football ==
In April 2016, it was made public that his name was found amongst those in the Panama Papers. Allegedly, he set up a company in Panama with the intent of evading Danish tax.

== Career statistics ==
=== Club ===
Appearances and goals by club, season and competition
Club	Season	League		
Club	Season	Division	Apps	Goals
Vejle	1988	1st Division	7	0
Vejle	1989	1st Division	26	0
Vejle	1990	1st Division	25	0
Vejle	1991–92	Danish Superliga	34	2
Vejle	Total		92	2
Odense BK	1992–93	Danish Superliga	31	4
Odense BK	1993–94	Danish Superliga	13	2
Odense BK	Total		44	6
Fenerbahçe	1993–94	First League	20	1
Fenerbahçe	1994–95	First League	30	3
Fenerbahçe	Total		50	4
Odense BK	1995–96	Danish Superliga	29	2
Urawa Reds	1996	J1 League	6	0
Odense BK	1996–97	Danish Superliga	13	0
Odense BK	1997–98	Danish Superliga	28	1
Odense BK	Total		41	1
Akademisk	1998–99	Danish Superliga	28	2
Akademisk	1999–00	Danish Superliga	27	5
Akademisk	2000–01	Danish Superliga	29	3
Akademisk	Total		84	10
Malmö	2001	Allsvenskan	15	0
Malmö	2002	Allsvenskan	14	0
Malmö	Total		29	0
AGF	2002–03	Danish Superliga	21	2
AGF	2003–04	Danish Superliga	29	2
AGF	2004–05	Danish Superliga	15	1
AGF	Total		65	5
Career total			440	30

=== International ===
Appearances and goals by national team and year
National team	Year	Apps	Goals
Denmark	1990	1	0
Denmark	1991	3	0
Denmark	1992	0	0
Denmark	1993	10	0
Denmark	1994	7	0
Denmark	1995	11	0
Denmark	1996	7	0
Denmark	1997	0	0
Denmark	1998	2	0
Denmark	1999	6	2
Denmark	2000	10	1
Denmark	2001	5	0
Denmark	2002	4	0
Total		66	3

== Honours ==
OB

- Danish Cup: 1993

AB

- Danish Cup: 1999

Denmark

- FIFA Confederations Cup: 1995
