= Nikolaj Hust =

Danish footballer (born 1978)

Personal information
- Full name: Nikolaj Anders Hust
- Date of birth: 30 October 1978 (age 48)
- Place of birth: ?, Denmark
- Height: 1.80 m (5 ft 11 in)
- Position: Midfielder

Team information
- Current team: FC Andrea Doria
- Number: 2

Youth career
- 1984–96: Ikast FS

Senior career*
Years	Team	Apps	(Gls)
1996–99	Ikast FS		
1999–2000	FC Midtjylland		
2000–02	Akademisk Boldklub		
2002–04	Aarhus GF		
2004–05	Fortuna Düsseldorf		
2005–2007	Vejle Boldklub	31	(0)
2008–	FC Andrea Doria		

International career^{‡}
1994–95	Denmark U-17	10	(0)
1995–97	Denmark U-19	8	(0)
1998–99	Denmark U-21	6	(0)
- * Club domestic league appearances and goals as of 17 June 2007 ‡ National team caps and goals as of 17 June 2007

Nikolaj Hust (born 30 October 1978) is a Danish professional football player who played for FC Andrea Doria. He most recently played for the Danish 1st Division club Vejle Boldklub.
