= Jacob Laursen =

Danish footballer (born 1971)

Personal information
- Full name: Jacob Thaysen-Laursen
- Date of birth: 6 October 1971 (age 55)
- Place of birth: Vejle, Denmark
- Position: Defender

Senior career*
| Years | Team | Apps | (Gls) |
| 1989–1992 | Vejle | 67 | (3) |
| 1992–1996 | Silkeborg | 125 | (8) |
| 1996–2000 | Derby County | 137 | (3) |
| 2000–2002 | Copenhagen | 45 | (3) |
| 2002 | Leicester City | 10 | (0) |
| 2002 | → Wolves (loan) | 0 | (0) |
| 2002 | → AGF (loan) | 5 | (0) |
| 2002–2003 | Rapid Wien | 8 | (0) |
| 2003–2004 | Vejle | 9 | (0) |
| 2004–2005 | Fredericia | 33 | (1) |
| Total | | 439 | (17) |

International career
| 1990 | Denmark U19 | 2 | (0) |
| 1990–1993 | Denmark U21 | 24 | (0) |
| 1995–1999 | Denmark | 25 | (0) |
Medal record
Men's football
Representing Denmark
FIFA Confederations Cup
| Winner | 1995 Saudi Arabia |
- * Club domestic league appearances and goals

Jacob Thaysen-Laursen (born 6 October 1971) is a Danish former professional footballer who played as a defender.

Laursen most notably played for English club Derby County and won the Danish Superliga championship with Silkeborg and Copenhagen. He gained 25 caps for the Denmark national team, with whom he won the 1995 King Fahd Cup and participated in the 1996 European Championship and 1998 FIFA World Cup tournaments.

== Club career ==
Born in Vejle, Laursen spent his childhood years playing for Vejle Kammeraterne and Vejle. He made his senior debut for VB in July 1989, and was named 1989 Danish U19 Player of the Year. He played at VB until the club was suffered relegation to the secondary Danish 1st Division in the summer 1992. Laursen then moved to Silkesborg, where he was part of the team that won the 1994 Danish Superliga championship.

In July 1996, Laursen moved abroad to play for English club Derby County in a transfer deal worth £500,000. He spent four seasons at Derby, where he played more than 100 games for the club. While he did not win over the Danish public while playing for the national team, Laursen was selected as team captain for Derby in a number of games, and was named "Player of the Year" in the 1998–99 season. One of his more memorable moments for the club was goal from a free-kick on 4 September 1996, he, from the edge of the penalty area, lashed the ball into the top corner, with great power and accuracy, to give Derby the lead against Alex Ferguson's Manchester United team.

In August 2000, Laursen moved back to Denmark to be closer to his children. He signed a contract with Copenhagen, moving to the club on a free transfer. In his first year at Copenhagen, the club won the 2000–01 Danish Superliga under manager Roy Hodgson. Before the new season, Laursen criticized his Copenhagen teammates for a lack of professionalism, and he left the club in January 2002. He moved back to England to play for Leicester City in January 2002, in a £400,000 transfer deal. He played ten games for Leicester before his relationship with the club turned sour.

After two months at Leicester, he spent a month on loan with the English club Wolverhampton Wanderers, before being loaned out to AGF in Denmark for the remainder of the 2001-02 season. He was loaned out to Greek club PAOK for the entire 2002–03 season, but eventually refused to play for the club. In November 2002, Laursen was given a free transfer by Leicester, which was struggling financially, and he left the club.

On 30 November 2002, he signed a contract with Austrian team Rapid Wien, but he was dropped from the team in April 2003. He moved back to Denmark to play on an amateur basis in September 2003, and enlisted at childhood club Vejle Boldklub in the second-tier Danish 1st Division. Laursen signed a contract with division rivals Fredericia in July 2004, and played with the club until he ended his career in September 2005.

== International career ==
Laursen represented Denmark at the 1992 Summer Olympics, where he played full-time in Denmark's three matches, before elimination. After the Olympics, he went on to captain the Denmark under-21 national team. After winning the Danish championship with Silkeborg, he made his Denmark senior national team debut in January 1995. He was selected for the 1995 King Fahd Cup by Denmark national team manager Richard Møller Nielsen, and went on to play in every game of the tournament, which Denmark won. He also played a single game for the Denmark national team at the 1996 European Championship.

He was a part of the Denmark national team at the 1998 FIFA World Cup, but was unimpressive in his single match participation at the tournament. In March 2000, he decided to end his national team career under national team manager Bo Johansson. Laursen cited personal reasons, as well as the booing he received by Danish spectators when he came on as a substitute for his 25th national team game in November 1999.

== Honours ==
Silkeborg

- Danish Superliga: 1993–94

Copenhagen

- Danish Superliga: 2000–01

Denmark

- King Fahd Cup:^{‡} 1995
- ^{‡}: In 1997, FIFA took over the organization of the tournament and named it the FIFA Confederations Cup.

Individual

- Danish U19 Player of the Year: 1989
- Derby County F.C. Player of the Year: 1999
