= Jens Risager =

Danish footballer (born 1971)

Personal information
- Date of birth: 9 April 1971 (age 55)
- Place of birth: Herning, Denmark
- Position: Left-back

Senior career*
Years	Team	Apps	(Gls)
1990–1998	Brøndby	222	(2)
1992	→ Ikast (loan)		

International career
1990–1992	Denmark U21	2	(0)
1994–1996	Denmark	13	(0)
Medal record
Men's football
Representing Denmark
FIFA Confederations Cup
Winner	1995 Saudi Arabia
- * Club domestic league appearances and goals

Jens Risager (born 9 April 1971), also known as Ayatollah Risager, is a Danish former professional footballer who played as a left-back. He most prominently won five Danish football championships with Brøndby IF. He played 13 matches for the Denmark national football team, with whom he won the 1995 King Fahd Cup and participated in the Euro 1996 tournament. He was selected for the Danish squad at the 1992 Summer Olympics, though he did not play any games at the tournament.

== Biography ==
Born in Herning, Risager started his career with Danish amateur clubs Herning Fremad and Holstebro BK. He moved to the Danish top-flight club Brøndby IF in January 1990, with whom he won the 1990 Danish 1st Division championship. He debuted for the Danish under-21 national team in September 1990, and played two under-21 national team games. Risager won the 1991 Danish championship with Brøndby, and was a part of the Brøndby squad which reached the semi-finals of the 1991 UEFA Cup international tournament. In January 1992, Risager was deemed surplus by Brøndby manager Morten Olsen, and was put on loan at secondary league club Ikast FS.

When his half-year loan contract ended later in 1992, Risager returned to Brøndby. He was a part of the Danish squad at the 1992 Summer Olympics, but did not play any games in the football tournament. Risager won the 1994 Danish Cup with Brøndby, and made his debut for the Danish national team under national team manager Richard Møller Nielsen in October 1994. The national team had missed a constant left defender, but the inclusion of Risager ahead of Michael Schjønberg from Odense BK was a surprise, not least to Risager himself. Risager was selected to represent Denmark at the 1995 King Fahd Cup, where he played in all three matches, as Denmark won the tournament.

He was called up to the Danish squad for the Euro 1996 tournament, and took part in Denmark's first game of the tournament, against Portugal. Denmark were ahead 1–0, when Portuguese striker Ricardo Sa Pinto edged ahead of Risager to equal the game at 1–1, the eventual result. Risager was singled out as the reason for the lost victory, and he took the blame for Sa Pinto's goal upon himself. For Denmark's remaining two games at the tournament, Risager was replaced by Schjønberg. Møller Nielsen ended his tenure as Danish national team coach following Euro 1996, and Risager would not play any more national team games.

Risager remained a steady part of the Brøndby starting line-up, and was a part of the Brøndby team which won three Danish championships in a row from 1996 to 1998. He retired from football in the summer 1998, aged 27, as he suffered from osteoarthritis in his knee.

== Honours ==
- Danish Championship: 1990, 1991, 1996, 1997, 1998
- Danish Cup: 1994, 1998
- 1995 King Fahd Cup
