= Mutiu Adepoju =

Nigerian footballer (born 1970)

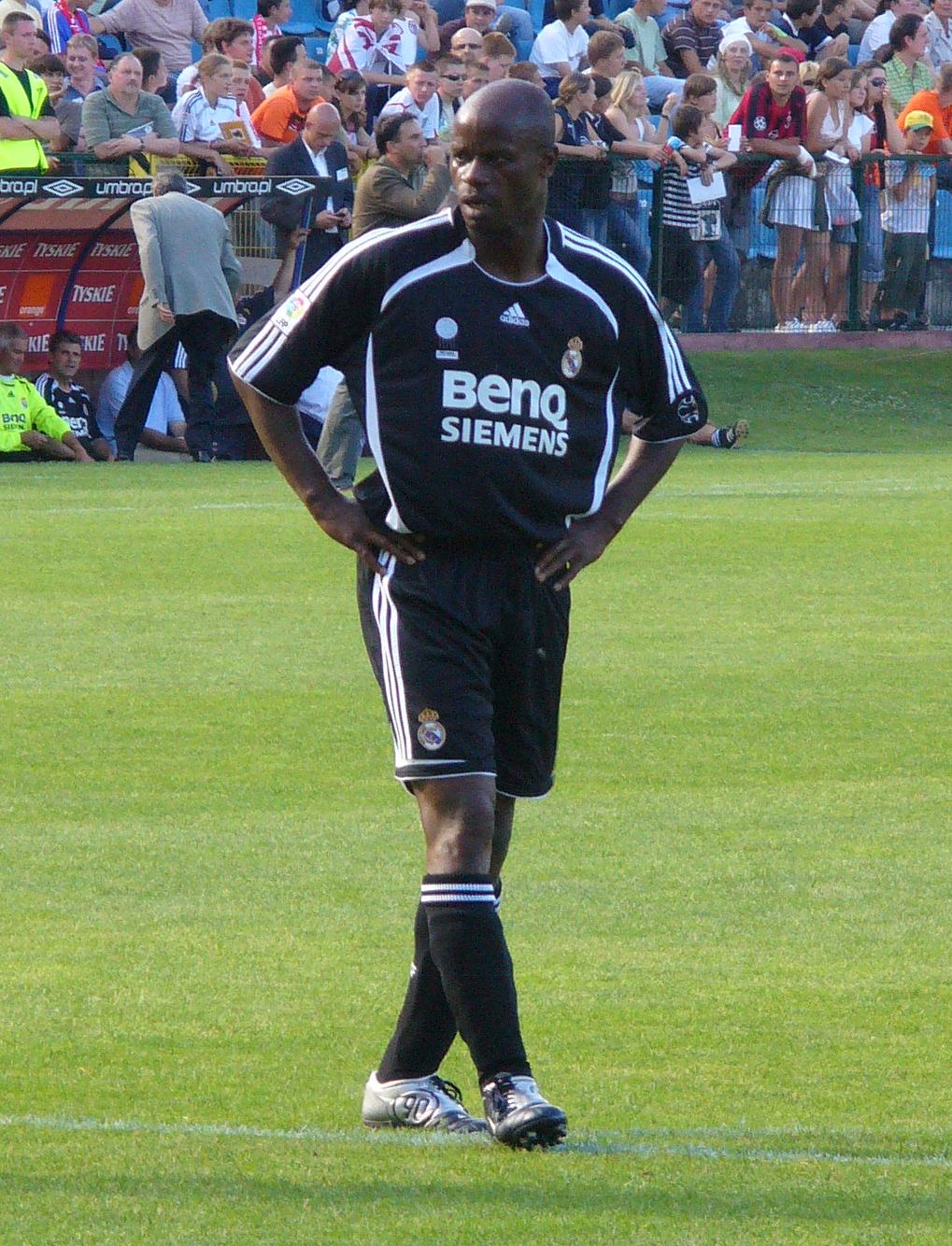
- Adepoju playing with Real Madrid veterans

Personal information
- Date of birth: 22 December 1970 (age 55)
- Place of birth: Ibadan, Nigeria
- Height: 1.80 m (5 ft 11 in)
- Position: Midfielder

Team information
- Current team: Shooting Stars (director of football)

Youth career
- 1986–1987: Femo Scorpions

Senior career*
Years	Team	Apps	(Gls)
1988	Shooting Stars		
1989	Julius Berger		
1989–1992	Real Madrid B	67	(27)
1992–1996	Racing Santander	124	(25)
1996–2000	Real Sociedad	88	(8)
2000–2001	Al-Ittihad	10	(2)
2001–2002	Salamanca	14	(0)
2002–2003	Samsunspor	8	(0)
2003–2004	AEL Limassol	5	(1)
2004–2005	Eldense		
2005–2006	Cobeña		

International career
1990–2002	Nigeria	48	(6)
- * Club domestic league appearances and goals

Mutiu Adepoju (born 22 December 1970) is a Nigerian former professional footballer who played as a midfielder.

He spent most of his career in Spain, amassing La Liga totals of 175 games and 22 goals over the course of seven seasons and representing mainly Racing de Santander and Real Sociedad.

A Nigeria international for 12 years, Adepoju appeared for the country in three World Cups and as many Africa Cup of Nations.

== Club career ==
Born in Ibadan, Adepoju (also called by his first name in Spain) left Nigeria in 1989 to join Real Madrid, but never made it past their reserves. The 1992–93 season was impressive as he scored 11 Segunda División goals to help Racing de Santander return to La Liga, and he continued to feature regularly for the Cantabrians over the next three years.

Mutiu left for Real Sociedad for 1996–97 but, after a solid first campaign, struggled heavily to hold down a regular place with the Basques. In 2001–02 he represented Saudi Arabia's Al-Ittihad Club (Jeddah), but quickly returned to Spain where he featured rarely for second division club UD Salamanca.

After two more weak years, in Turkey and Cyprus, Adepoju retired in 2006 in Spain's lower leagues. He subsequently returned to his first team Shooting Stars FC, as general manager.

== International career ==
Adepoju was a member of the Nigeria U20 team that played in the 1989 FIFA World Youth Championship. His brace against the United States (which featured Kasey Keller in goal) in the semi-finals ensured a final against Portugal, a 2–0 defeat.

Adepoju went on to collect 48 caps for the full side, with six goals. He made his debut against Togo in August 1990, but his breakthrough came during the 1992 Africa Cup of Nations, and he helped his nation win the next continental edition.

Adepoju was part of Nigeria's squads for the FIFA World Cups in 1994, 1998 – where he scored in a 3–2 win against Spain– and 2002, although he did not play in the latter tournament. He reflected on his career and noted that his header against Spain was his proudest and best World Cup moment.

== Career statistics ==
=== International ===
Appearances and goals by national team and year
National team	Year	Apps	Goals
Nigeria	1990	3	0
Nigeria	1991	1	0
Nigeria	1992	7	1
Nigeria	1993	3	0
Nigeria	1994	10	2
Nigeria	1995	5	1
Nigeria	1996	2	0
Nigeria	1997	4	1
Nigeria	1998	6	1
Nigeria	1999	2	0
Nigeria	2000	4	0
Nigeria	2002	1	0
Total		48	6

Scores and results list Nigeria's goal tally first, score column indicates score after each Adepoju goal.

List of international goals scored by Mutiu Adepoju
No.	Date	Venue	Opponent	Score	Result	Competition	Ref.
1	23 January 1992	Stade de l'Amitié, Dakar, Senegal	Ghana	1–0	1–2	1992 African Cup of Nations	
2	26 March 1994	El Menzah Stadium, Tunis, Tunisia	Gabon	2–0	3–0	1994 African Cup of Nations	
3	11 June 1994	Liberty Stadium, Ibadan, Nigeria	Georgia	5–1	5–1	Friendly	
4	6 January 1995	King Fahd International Stadium, Riyadh, Saudi Arabia	Japan	2–0	3–0	1995 King Fahd Cup	
5	27 April 1997	Stade du 4 Août, Ouagadougou, Burkina Faso	Burkina Faso	1–0	2–1	1998 FIFA World Cup qualification	
6	13 June 1998	Stade de la Beaujoire, Nantes, France	Spain	1–1	3–2	1998 FIFA World Cup	
