= Jes Høgh =

Danish footballer (born 1966)

Personal information
- Date of birth: 7 May 1966 (age 60)
- Place of birth: Aalborg, Denmark
- Height: 1.85 m (6 ft 1 in)
- Position: Centre-back

Senior career*
Years	Team	Apps	(Gls)
1986–1987	Aalborg Chang	50	(0)
1987–1991	AaB	95	(13)
1991–1994	Brøndby	79	(6)
1994–1995	AaB	14	(4)
1995–1999	Fenerbahçe	115	(6)
1999–2001	Chelsea	9	(0)
Total		362	(29)

International career
1991–2000	Denmark	57	(1)
Medal record
Men's football
Representing Denmark
FIFA Confederations Cup
Winner	1995 Saudi Arabia
- * Club domestic league appearances and goals

Jes Høgh (Danish pronunciation: [ˈhøːˀj]; born 7 May 1966) is a Danish former professional footballer who played as a centre-back. He played 57 matches and scored 1 goal for the Denmark national team, and Høgh represented Denmark at the 1998 FIFA World Cup, as well as the UEFA Euro 1996 and UEFA Euro 2000 tournaments. He was a part of the Denmark team that won the 1995 King Fahd Cup.

== Career ==
Born in Aalborg, Høgh began his career in Aalborg Chang. In 1987, he moved to crosstown club AaB in the top-flight Danish 1st Division. At AaB he formed an attacking midfield duo with Peter Rasmussen, and especially the 1990 season was a breakthrough as Høgh scored 7 goals in 26 games. He suffered a knee injury in late 1990, but Høgh managed to make his debut for the Denmark national team when he took part in the April 1991 friendly match 1–1 draw with Bulgaria.

As his contract with AaB ran out in January 1992, he had signed a new deal with league rivals Silkeborg in November 1990. However, a clause in his Silkeborg contract allowed him to change clubs within his first six months at the club, and Høgh never got to even train with his new teammates, as he transferred to Danish champions Brøndby for 500,000 DKK in October 1991.

=== The returning champion ===
At Brøndby, Høgh was re-schooled from his midfielder role to a central defender, who from time to time took part in the attacking moves. He was one of several new players from Jutland clubs who arrived at Brøndby that year, including Marc Rieper who Høgh would later spend the majority of his Denmark national team matches partnering in the Danish central defense. Despite personal success, with Høgh being named 1993 Brøndby Player of the Year, the club only won a single Danish Cup trophy in his time at the club. In his last year at Brøndby, Høgh suffered minor injuries and he lost his place in the starting line-up for both club and country.

In November 1994 he moved back to AaB on a three-year semi-professional contract. He played the second half of the 1994–95 season, as AaB won the Danish championship. He also played full-time in all three matches, as the Denmark national team won the 1995 King Fahd Cup. Following the title wins, Høgh moved abroad to play for Fenerbahçe in Turkey, for 11 million DKK in June 1995.

=== Moving abroad ===
In his first year at Fenerbahçe, he and former Brøndby player Uche Okechukwu formed the defensive duo, in a season that ended in the first Süper Lig championship for the club in seven years. He is still an unforgettable defence player for Fenerbahce Fans. In the meantime, Høgh had re-entered the Denmark national team starting line-up, and he played full-time in Denmark's three matches at the UEFA Euro 1996. He also appeared in all Denmark's five matches at the 1998 FIFA World Cup, before he transferred to English club Chelsea for 3.5 million DKK in July 1999.

At Chelsea, Høgh was a back-up player to French internationals Marcel Desailly and Frank Leboeuf. He won the 2000 FA Cup with the club, contributing two appearances to Chelsea's victorious campaign, and he was also called up for Denmark to play the UEFA Euro 2000 tournament, though he sat out in all games through injury. He played 17 matches for Chelsea, 9 in the league, until an ankle injury forced Høgh to retire in March 2001.

== Personal life ==
In January 2007, Høgh suffered an intermediate stroke while at a hotel room in Copenhagen. He was talking to his wife on the phone at the time, and was quickly aided by paramedics. He was also unable to move any of his right side and could not speak afterwards. During his recovery, he received moral support from both his former clubs Chelsea and Fenerbahce.

== Career statistics ==
Only league games included.

Appearances and goals by club, season and competition
Club	Season	League		
Club	Season	Division	Apps	Goals
Aalborg Chang	19??–1987		50	?
AaB	1987	Danish 1st Division	21	2
AaB	1988	Danish 1st Division	18	1
AaB	1989	Danish 1st Division	23	1
AaB	1990	Danish 1st Division	26	7
AaB	1991	Danish Superliga	7	2
AaB	Total		95	13
Brøndby	1991–92	Danish Superliga	7	1
Brøndby	1992–93	Danish Superliga	30	3
Brøndby	1993–94	Danish Superliga	29	2
Brøndby	1994–95	Danish Superliga	13	0
Brøndby	Total		79	6
AaB	1994–95	Danish Superliga	14	4
Fenerbahçe	1995–96	Süper Lig	34	2
Fenerbahçe	1996–97	Süper Lig	25	2
Fenerbahçe	1997–98	Süper Lig	30	0
Fenerbahçe	1998–99	Süper Lig	26	2
Fenerbahçe	Total		115	6
Chelsea	1999–00	Premier League	9	0
Chelsea	2000–01	Premier League	0	0
Chelsea	Total		9	0
Career total			362	29

== Honours ==
Brøndby IF

- Danish Cup: 1993–94

Aalborg

- Danish Superliga: 1994–95

Fenerbahçe

- Süper Lig: 1995–96

Chelsea

- FA Cup: 2000

Denmark

- King Fahd Cup: 1995
