= Jesper Kristensen =

Danish footballer (born 1971)

Personal information
- Date of birth: 9 October 1971 (age 55)
- Place of birth: Esbjerg, Denmark
- Position: Midfielder

Senior career*
Years	Team	Apps	(Gls)
1989–1991	Esbjerg fB	42	(4)
1991–1995	Brøndby	103	(11)

International career
1994–1995	Denmark	4	(0)
Medal record
Men's football
Representing Denmark
FIFA Confederations Cup
Winner	1995 Saudi Arabia
- * Club domestic league appearances and goals

Jesper Kristensen (born 9 October 1971) is a Danish former professional footballer, who made 129 appearances for Danish team Brøndby IF in the midfielder position. He played four games for the Denmark national football team, with whom he won the 1995 King Fahd Cup.

Born in Esbjerg, Kristensen started his career with lower league club Esbjerg fB. In the summer 1991, he moved to defending Danish champions Brøndby IF. He was named 1993 "Danish U21 Player of the Year", and made his Danish national team debut in April 1994. He helped Brøndby win the 1994 Danish Cup trophy, and was a part of the Danish team which won the King Fahd Cup in January 1995. He played a few matches in Brøndby's 1995–96 Superliga winning season, before he had to prematurely end his career in August 1995, due to injuries. He played a total 129 games for Brøndby, including 103 games and 11 goals in the Superliga.

== Honours ==
Brøndby

- Danish Superliga: 1995–96
- Danish Cup: 1993–94

Denmark

- FIFA Confederations Cup: 1995
