= Joaquín del Olmo =

Mexican footballer (born 1969)

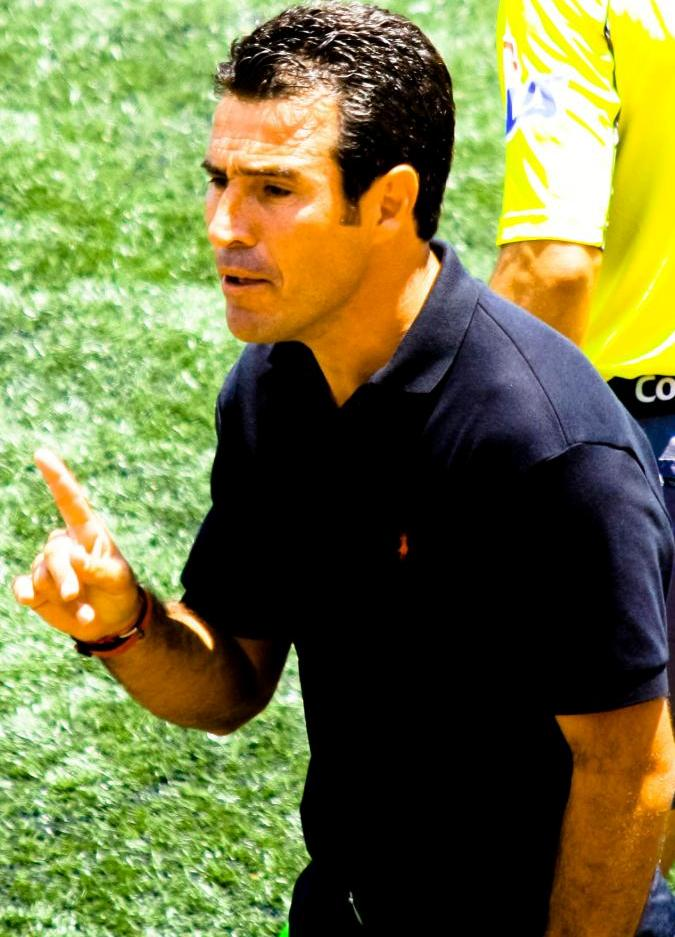
- del Olmo in 2010

Personal information
- Full name: Joaquín Alberto del Olmo Blanco
- Date of birth: 20 April 1969 (age 57)
- Place of birth: Tampico, Tamaulipas, Mexico
- Height: 1.75 m (5 ft 9 in)
- Position: Midfielder

Senior career*
Years	Team	Apps	(Gls)
1988–1990	Tampico Madero	52	(1)
1990–1994	Veracruz	85	(5)
1994–1996	América	70	(4)
1996–1997	Vitesse	15	(4)
1997–1998	Necaxa	38	(1)
1998–2003	Tigres UANL	113	(4)
2000	→ Puebla (loan)	13	(0)
2002	→ Chiapas (loan)	14	(2)
2003–2005	UNAM	51	(2)
Total		451	(23)

International career
1993–2001	Mexico	51	(3)

Managerial career
- 2006–2007: Tigres B (assistant)
- 2007–2008: Correcaminos UAT (assistant)
- 2009: Correcaminos UAT
- 2009–2010: Veracruz
- 2010–2011: Tijuana
- 2012: Veracruz
- 2012: UNAM
- 2013: Correcaminos UAT
- 2014–2019: Real Oviedo (sporting director)
- * Club domestic league appearances and goals

Joaquín Alberto del Olmo Blanco (born 20 April 1969) is a Mexican former professional footballer and manager who played as a midfielder.

== Career ==
=== Club ===
Born in Tampico, Tamaulipas, Del Olmo made his professional debut with Tampico Madero on January 31, 1989, in a match against Irapuato. He later joined Veracruz for the 1990-91 season, where he spent four years. Ahead of the 1994 FIFA World Cup, he completed a move to Club América for the 1994-95 campaign.

For the 1996-97 season, the midfielder made history by becoming the first Mexican footballer to play in Dutch football. Del Olmo signed with Vitesse at the express request of head coach Leo Beenhakker, who had previously worked with him during his tenure at Club América.

After a year in Europe, he returned to Mexico to join Necaxa. Over the course of his career, he also represented Tigres UANL, Puebla, Jaguares de Chiapas, and Pumas UNAM.

At Pumas, under the leadership of head coach Hugo Sánchez, Del Olmo enjoyed one of the most successful periods of his career. He helped the club win two Primera División titles and the Campeón de Campeones, cementing his legacy as part of a memorable era for the university side.

He ultimately brought his professional playing career to a close with Pumas at the end of the Clausura 2005 tournament.

=== International ===
On the international stage, Del Olmo represented Mexico at the 1994 FIFA World Cup, the 1995 FIFA Confederations Cup, and also featured in the 1995 Copa América. He won the CONCACAF Gold Cup in both 1993 and 1996.

== Managerial career ==
After retiring from professional football, Del Olmo transitioned into coaching, taking charge of several second division clubs, including Correcaminos, Veracruz, and Tijuana. His most notable achievement came with Tijuana, whom he guided to promotion in 2010. He also managed Pumas UNAM in Mexico's top flight.

Following the acquisition of Real Oviedo by Mexican businessman Carlos Slim, Del Olmo was appointed the club's sporting director, serving in the role from 2014 to 2019. He later served in the same capacity at FC Juárez between 2021 and 2023. In 2026, he joined Fox Sports México as a football analyst.

== Career statistics ==
No.	Date	Venue	Opponent	Score	Result	Competition	Ref.
1.	13 October 1993	RFK Stadium, Washington, D.C., United States	United States	1–0	1–1	Friendly	
2.	29 May 1996	Hakatanomori Football Stadium, Fukuoka, Japan	Japan	1–0	2–3	1996 Kirin Cup	
3.	13 April 1997	Estadio Azteca, Mexico City, Mexico	Jamaica	5–0	6–0	1998 FIFA World Cup qualification	

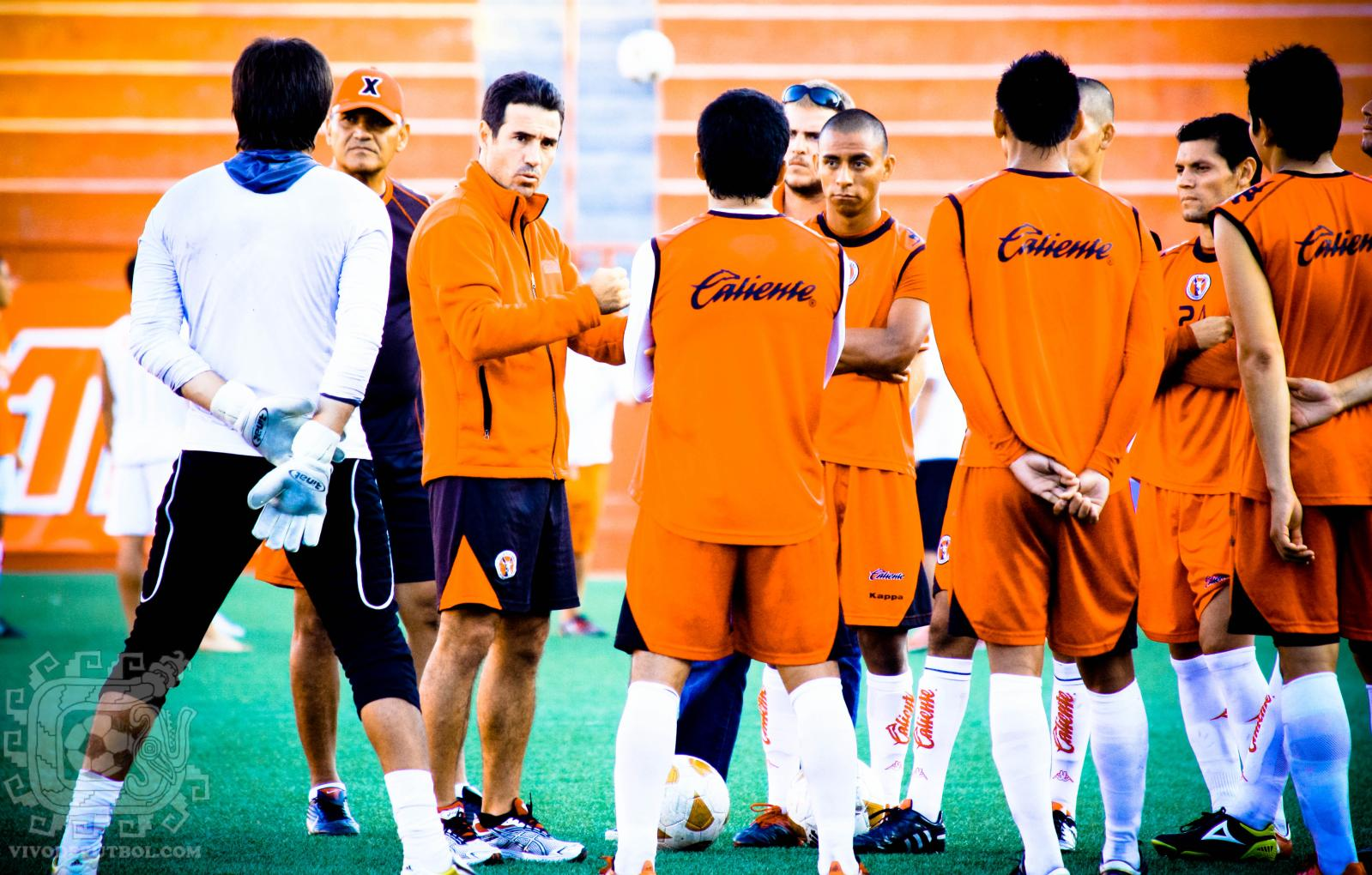
Joaquín del Olmo explaining tactics to team

== Honours ==
=== Player ===
UNAM

- Mexican Primera División: Clausura 2004, Apertura 2004

=== Manager ===
Tijuana

- Liga de Ascenso: Apertura 2010
