= Hussein Al-Sadiq =

Saudi Arabian footballer

Personal information
- Full name: Hussein Jawad Al-Sadiq
- Date of birth: 15 October 1973 (age 53)
- Place of birth: Saudi Arabia
- Height: 1.82 m (6 ft 0 in)
- Position: Goalkeeper

Youth career
- 1988-1991: Al-Noor

Senior career*
Years	Team	Apps	(Gls)
1991–1998	Al-Qadisiya		
1998–2007	Al-Ittihad		

International career
1993–1999	Saudi Arabia	64	(0)
- * Club domestic league appearances and goals

Hussein Jawad Al-Sadiq (Arabic: حُسين الصادق; born 15 October 1973) is a Saudi Arabian former footballer in goalkeeper role.

He played on club level for Al-Qadisiya and Al-Ittihad. For Saudi Arabia, he was selected at 1994 FIFA World Cup, 1996 Summer Olympics and 1998 FIFA World Cup.
