= Mohammed Al-Kharashy =

Saudi Arabian football manager

Mohammed Al-Kharashi (Arabic: محمد الخراشي) is a Saudi Arabian football manager.

== Career ==
In the 1994 FIFA World Cup Asian qualifiers, he took charge of the Saudi Arabia national team for their final match, after the original manager Candinho was fired. He led Saudi Arabia to a 4-3 victory against Iran, leading them to qualify for the finals.

Under his tutelage, Saudi Arabia won their first ever Gulf Cup in 1994.

In the 1998 FIFA World Cup finals, he took charge of the Saudi Arabia national football team for their final group match, after original manager Carlos Alberto Parreira was fired after two losses and saw the team eliminated from contention. Saudi Arabia played South Africa to a 2–2 draw in that match.
