= Michael Laudrup =

Danish footballer and coach (born 1964)

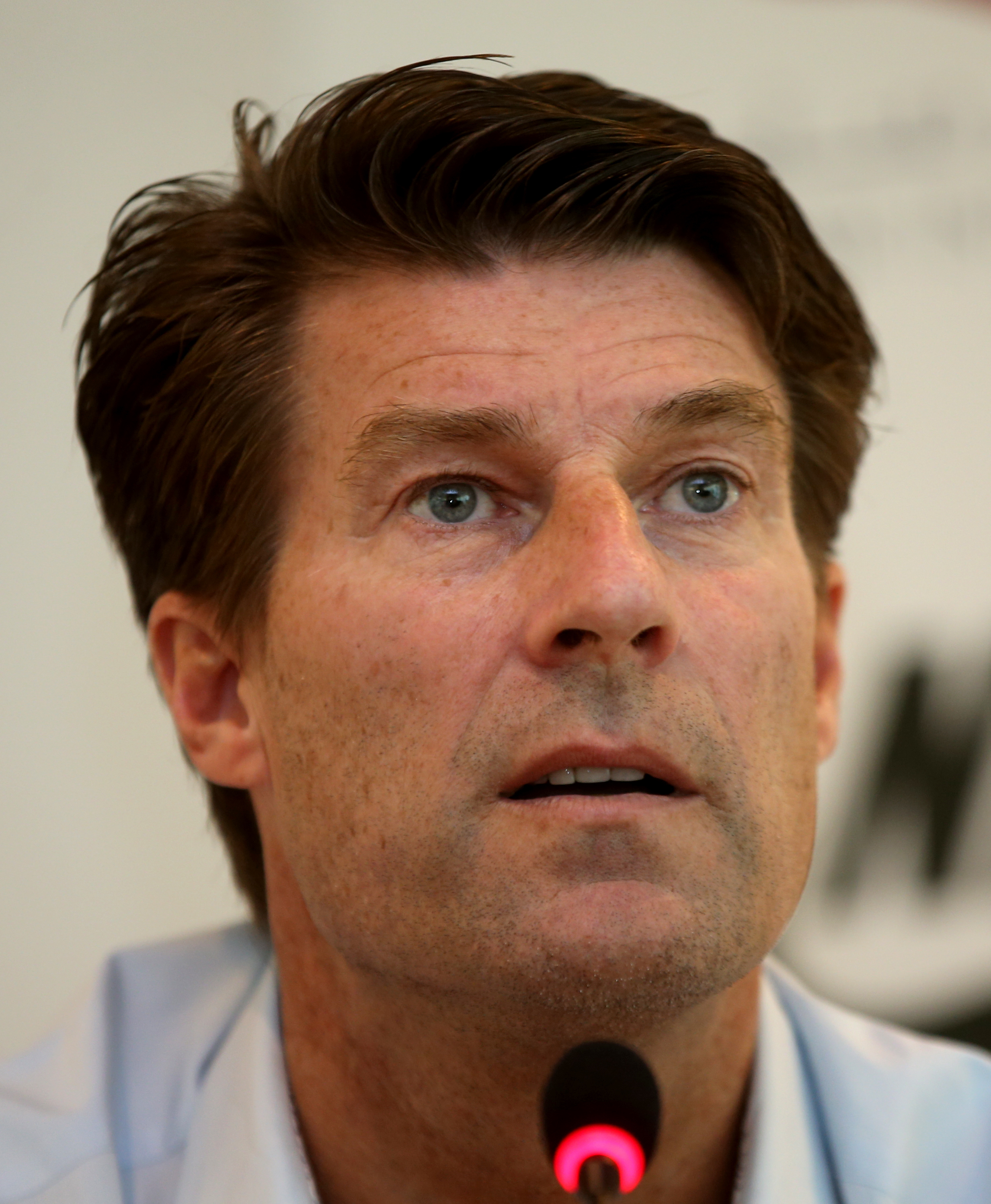
- Laudrup in 2016

Personal information
- Full name: Michael Laudrup
- Date of birth: 15 June 1964 (age 62)
- Place of birth: Frederiksberg, Denmark
- Height: 1.83 m (6 ft 0 in)
- Positions: Attacking midfielder; second striker

Youth career
- 1971–1973: Vanløse
- 1973–1974: Brøndby
- 1974–1980: KB

Senior career*
Years	Team	Apps	(Gls)
1981	KB	14	(3)
1982–1983	Brøndby	38	(24)
1983–1985	Lazio	60	(9)
1985–1989	Juventus	103	(16)
1989–1994	Barcelona	166	(41)
1994–1996	Real Madrid	62	(12)
1996–1997	Vissel Kobe	15	(5)
1997–1998	Ajax	21	(11)
Total		478	(119)

International career
1980	Denmark U17	4	(2)
1980–1981	Denmark U19	19	(12)
1982	Denmark U21	2	(0)
1982–1998	Denmark	104	(37)

Managerial career
- 2002–2006: Brøndby
- 2007–2008: Getafe
- 2008–2009: Spartak Moscow
- 2010–2011: Mallorca
- 2012–2014: Swansea City
- 2014–2015: Lekhwiya
- 2016–2018: Al Rayyan
Medal record
Men's football
Representing Denmark
FIFA Confederations Cup
Winner	1995 Saudi Arabia
- * Club domestic league appearances and goals

Michael Laudrup (Danish pronunciation: [ˈmiˌkʰɛˀl ˈlɑwˀtʁɔp], born 15 June 1964) is a Danish professional football coach and former player. Known for his playmaking and technical abilities, he is regarded as one of the greatest players of all time. He is the older brother of fellow retired footballer Brian Laudrup.

During his playing career, Laudrup won league titles with Ajax, Barcelona, Real Madrid and Juventus, playing mainly as an attacking midfielder, although he was also capable of playing in other attacking positions. In a period where Laudrup was recognized as one of the best football players of his generation, he became a key member of Johan Cruyff's "Dream Team". At Barcelona, Laudrup claimed nine trophies in total, including four successive La Liga titles from 1991 to 1994 and the European Cup in 1992, as he moved to arch-rivals Real Madrid in 1994, with whom he won his fifth consecutive La Liga title.

Laudrup made his debut for the Denmark national team on his 18th birthday in 1982, and scored 37 goals in 104 appearances. He starred in the 1986 FIFA World Cup, and from November 1994, he captained Denmark for a total of 28 matches, including the victorious 1995 Confederations Cup tournament. He played alongside his brother Brian in the Denmark team that reached the quarter-finals of the 1998 World Cup, and retired as an active player after the tournament.

In 1999, Laudrup was voted the Best Foreign Player in Spanish Football over the preceding 25-year period and in April 2000 he was knighted, receiving the Order of the Dannebrog. In November 2003, to celebrate UEFA's Jubilee, he was selected as the Golden Player of Denmark by the Danish Football Union, their most outstanding player of the past 50 years. He was officially named the best Danish footballer of all time by the Danish Football Union (DBU) in November 2006. He was named by Pelé in the FIFA 100 list of the world's greatest living players at a FIFA awards ceremony in 2004. In April 2013, he was named by Marca readers in the "Best foreign eleven in Real Madrid's history".

After retiring as a player, Laudrup took up coaching, and became assistant manager of the Denmark national team. He got his first manager job at former club Brøndby in 2002, whom he guided to the 2005 Danish Superliga championship. He chose not to extend his contract with Brøndby in May 2006. He took over as coach of Getafe and had notable success there. He brought the club comparative success in the Copa del Rey and UEFA Cup, and the team's attacking style received plaudits. On 15 June 2012, Laudrup was appointed the manager of Premier League club Swansea City on a two-year contract. In his first season in south Wales, he won the League Cup, the first major English trophy in Swansea's 100-year history. On 4 February 2014, he was sacked by Swansea after a "significant" slump in the Premier League, leaving them two points above the relegation zone. Laudrup then managed Qatari clubs Lekhwiya and Al Rayyan between 2014 and 2018.

On 16 October 2021, at a show celebrating the National Olympic Committee and Sports Confederation of Denmark's 125th anniversary, 125 candidates for the title of the greatest ever Danish sports star had been reduced to eight, and Laudrup was named the winner.

== Club career ==
Born in Frederiksberg, Copenhagen, Michael Laudrup began playing football in father Finn Laudrup's childhood club Vanløse. When Finn Laudrup became player/coach of Brøndby in 1973, the family moved to Brøndby and both Michael and his brother Brian Laudrup started playing for the club as well. Michael followed his father to the top-flight Danish 1st Division club KB in 1976, while Brian remained at Brøndby.

=== Early career ===
Laudrup made his senior debut playing for KB in 1981, and made his debut for the Danish under-19 national team in February 1981. In all, he scored a combined total of 14 goals in 25 games at various youth levels. He went back to play for Brøndby in 1982, where his father had ended his career in 1981, contributing to the promotion of Brøndby to the 1st Division.

At Brøndby, Laudrup scored two goals in the club's 1st Division debut game, as fellow promoted team B 1909 were beaten 7–1. He scored 15 league goals in 1982, and ended the season as the third top goal scorer of the 1st Division. His accomplishments earned him the 1982 Danish Player of the Year award. He played part of the 1983 season for Brøndby, and scored nine goals, before he was sold to defending Serie A champions Juventus from Italy in June 1983. It was the biggest transfer deal in Danish football at the time, worth around $1 million. He was due to sign for Liverpool the same year on a three-year contract, but at the last minute, Liverpool proposed a four-year contract and Laudrup opted not to sign.

=== Lazio ===
Under restriction of a maximum of two foreign players in the team, of which the club had Polish midfielder Zbigniew Boniek and Michel Platini, Juventus initially lent Laudrup to newly promoted Rome club Lazio for a single season, something he had not been informed about before signing for Juventus. With Lazio, he scored two goals in his Serie A debut, a 2–4 loss to Hellas Verona. In his first year at Lazio, Lazio narrowly avoided relegation, but as Juventus wanted to keep Boniek and Platini, he stayed for another year. Lazio started the 1984–85 season poorly, eventually finishing in last place to become relegated to Serie B. Laudrup scored just one goal that season.

=== Juventus ===
Laudrup returned to Juventus in summer 1985 to replace Zbigniew Boniek, playing alongside Michel Platini. In his first year at the club, he won the 1985–86 Serie A as well as the Intercontinental Cup trophy, scoring the equalising goal in the final of the latter tournament, although he later missed a penalty in the resulting shoot-out; he was once again named Danish Player of the Year in 1985. However, the following season was not a success for Laudrup, who suffered multiple injuries. When Platini retired in 1987, Laudrup was expected to lead the team in his place, playing alongside newly bought Welsh forward Ian Rush. But Laudrup failed to live up to Platini's standards and did not score any goals, despite playing all 30 matches of the 1987–88 season.

=== Barcelona ===
After an unsuccessful season with Juventus, Laudrup decided it was time to leave, looking for a new experience after six years in Italy. In 1989, he joined Spanish club Barcelona on the premise that Dutch coach Johan Cruyff, his childhood role model, had been assembling a team that was striving for success. Immediately, Laudrup enjoyed major success under Cruyff's leadership, citing the Dutchman's philosophy and perception of the game as one of the main assets that helped foster his talent. He was one of the restricted three foreign players allowed in the team, alongside Dutch defender Ronald Koeman and Bulgarian striker Hristo Stoichkov, who were the pillars of the Barça "Dream Team", along with rising stars Pep Guardiola, José Mari Bakero and Txiki Begiristain.

The Dream Team played attractive football that was comparable to the 1970s Ajax team, and won four consecutive La Liga championships from 1991 to 1994, as well as the 1991–92 European Cup, along with the 1992 UEFA Super Cup, 1989–90 Copa del Rey and 1991 and 1992 Supercopa de España titles. Laudrup was twice named the best player of the year in Spain during his Barcelona years. When Barça hired a fourth foreign star player, Brazilian striker Romário in 1993, it meant the four foreigners would rotate as the three foreign players allowed in each match, and when he was not selected for the 1994 European Cup final 0–4 loss to Milan (amid conflicts with Cruyff), his time at Barcelona was effectively over. After the match, Milan's manager Fabio Capello remarked: "Laudrup was the guy I feared but Cruyff left him out, and that was his mistake."

Laudrup's departure from Barcelona was a huge blow for the fans and his teammates alike. Pep Guardiola was reportedly so upset by the news that he cried and begged Laudrup to change his mind. Reflecting on his time at Barcelona, Laudrup commented: "I think we played some very good football, and I think most of all we demonstrated that even without getting the ten best players in the world, you can have the best team. Because everybody talked about Begiristain, Bakero, Guardiola, Stoichkov, and Koeman, but when we started none of us was a best player, then we became maybe the best team in the world, together with AC Milan in that period."

=== Real Madrid ===
In 1994, Laudrup completed a controversial move from Barça to Real Madrid after he fell out with Johan Cruyff. On this, Laudrup stated he did not have a hidden agenda. It was the year after the 1994 FIFA World Cup and according to him, because players usually suffer a drop in performance after such a major international tournament, he correctly predicted that Barcelona would not win major trophies the following season.

Despite widespread belief Laudrup joined arch-rivals Real Madrid in an attempt to "get back" at Cruyff, the decision was based on the fact Real Madrid had been struggling for a long period and were eager to return to supremacy, like Barcelona when he decided to join them. Laudrup said: "People say I wanted to go to Real Madrid just to get revenge. I say revenge from what? I've had a perfect time; five fantastic years here [at Barcelona]. I went to Madrid because they were so hungry to win, and they had four or five players who went to the World Cup. I said this would be perfect; new coach, new players, and hungry to win." On 5 November 1994, he assisted Raúl's first professional goal in a 4–2 win over Atlético Madrid

Laudrup went on to guide Real Madrid in a championship-winning season that would end the Barça stranglehold, making him the only player to win the Spanish league five consecutive seasons playing for two different clubs. After the initial success at Real, a lackluster club season would follow. Despite only playing two seasons at Real Madrid, he was voted the 12th-best player in Real Madrid history in an internet survey by Spanish newspaper Marca when the club celebrated its 100th anniversary in 2002. Daniel Storey wrote of Laudrup, "no other player is loved on both sides of the clásico divide quite like Laudrup" as he remains held in high regard by both Barça and Madrid fans. Following the match, Laudrup's former Barcelona manager Cruyff commented: "When Michael plays like a dream, a magic illusion, determined to show his new team his extreme abilities, no one in the world comes anywhere near his level."

=== Later career and retirement ===
In 1996, Laudrup left Real Madrid to play for Vissel Kobe in Japan. On 18 August 1996, he played his first match for Vissel Kobe and scored two goals in a 4–2 win against Brummell Sendai. On 15 September 1996, he recorded three assists, including his first assist for Vissel Kobe in a 5–1 victory against Hokkaido Consadole Sapporo. He helped Vissel to promotion from the second-tier Japan Football League to the J1 League.

He was registered as a player in Bosnian Premier League club Čelik Zenica in a controversial signing in which he did not play any games for Čelik, but was signed as a player. After the details were resolved, he ended his playing career in a championship winning season at Dutch side Ajax in 1998.

Following his retirement, Laudrup sometimes turned out to play for Lyngby's Old Boys team in his spare time.

== International career ==
Laudrup with Denmark c. 1986

Laudrup was called up for the Denmark national team during Brøndby's debut season in the top-flight. On his 18th birthday on 15 June 1982, he became the then-second-youngest Danish national team player ever, following Harald Nielsen. Despite playing for relegation battlers Lazio, Laudrup starred for the Denmark national team at UEFA Euro 1984, playing all four of Denmark's matches.

Laudrup participated in the 1986 FIFA World Cup in Mexico, a performance which is best remembered for his exceptional solo dribble and goal in the 6–1 defeat of Uruguay. He was also a part of the disappointing Denmark squad at Euro 1988, though Laudrup experienced personal success, scoring one of Denmark's two goals.

Following three matches in the qualification campaign for Euro 1992, Laudrup opted to quit the national team in November 1990 (alongside his brother Brian Laudrup and Jan Mølby) following differences with coach Richard Møller Nielsen. The Danes originally failed to qualify but were later given Yugoslavia's place as Yugoslavia were disqualified due to war in their country. Notwithstanding their qualification, Laudrup rated Denmark's chances of success so low he stayed on holiday. However, Denmark caused one of the biggest upsets in football history by going on to win the tournament, beating holders the Netherlands in the semi-final and, in the final beating reigning world champions and favourites Germany, with a 2–0 win thanks to goals from John Jensen and Kim Vilfort.

Laudrup returned to Nielsen's Danish squad in August 1993, but saw Spain and the Republic of Ireland qualify for the 1994 World Cup ahead of Denmark. He scored a goal in the 2–0 victory against Argentina, as Denmark won the 1995 Intercontinental Cup. He also scored four goals in ten matches as Denmark qualified for Euro 1996.

Laudrup's last matches for Denmark came at the 1998 World Cup, when he captained the nation to the quarterfinal. Laudrup made his 100th appearance for Denmark in the team's opening game of the tournament, a 1–0 defeat of Saudi Arabia in Lens. On 24 June, he scored a goal in a 1–2 defeat to France. On 28 June, Laudrup provided two assists in a 4–1 win over the Nigeria in the round of 16. Denmark was defeated 2–3 by Brazil in the quarter-finals, and both Michael and Brian Laudrup announced their international retirement following the elimination. Both brothers ended their international careers on a high note as both Michael and Brian were named in FIFA's All-Star Team.

== Player profile ==
=== Style of play ===
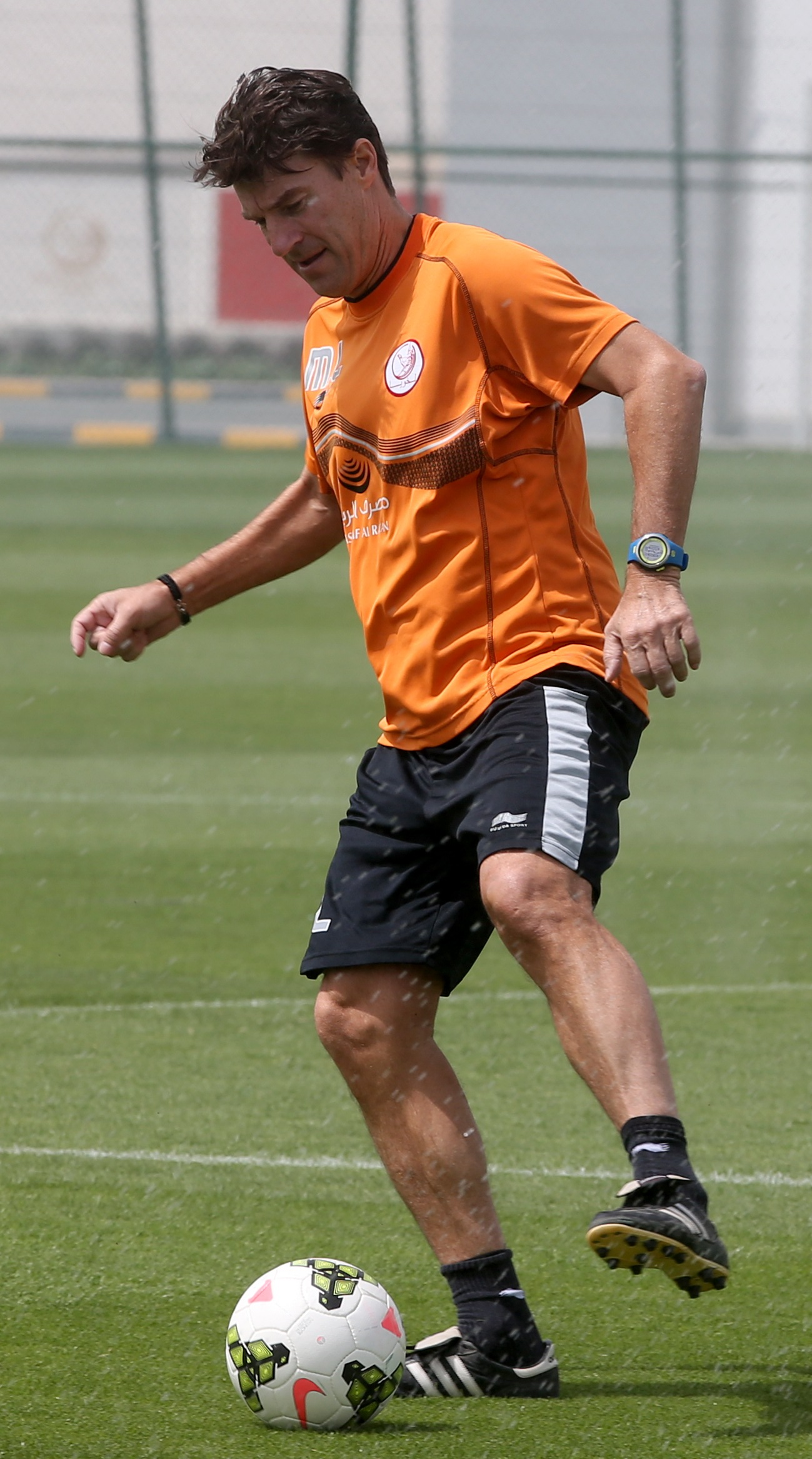
Laudrup demonstrating his skills in Qatar, 2015

Laudrup is regarded as one of the most effective and versatile attacking midfielders, as well as one of the most technically gifted players in football history. Primarily an offensive playmaker, he operated in several positions across and behind the front line, including as a winger, central midfielder, deep-lying playmaker, and, early in his career, as a second striker. He has also played as forward and striker under Barcelona manager Johan Cruyff, who used him in a role comparable to the modern false 9. He also played as a forward and centre-forward under Barcelona manager Cruyff throughout his playing career. Throughout his career, Laudrup is notable for his passing abilities and is widely considered as one of the best passers in the history of the sport.

Regarding Laudrup's vision and passing ability, his brother Brian stated in 2008: "My brother started as an attacker but became an elegant attacking midfielder, perhaps the most complete there has ever been. His vision, speed of thought and passing were on a different level; he always knew what was going to happen before anybody else did. If anyone had a 'football brain', it was him." Despite being primarily a creative team player, he also possessed an accurate shot, and was capable of scoring goals as well as creating them.

Nicknamed "The Prince of Denmark", throughout his career, Laudrup was acclaimed for his technique, balance, elegance, ball control, and dribbling ability, as well as his vision, ability to read the game, and range of passing, including deep passes, through balls, and crosses, which made him an excellent assist provider. In regard to his vision, Jorge Valdano, the Argentinian coach of Laudrup in Real Madrid, said, "[He] has eyes everywhere." His trademark move – looking one way and passing the other – fooled countless opponents during his career.

The Laudrup dribble, a signature feint also known as the croqueta, was perhaps the best-known part of his game, and involved him quickly moving the ball from one foot to the other away from the defender, a move which was later also popularised by later Barcelona midfielder Andrés Iniesta. Laudrup's ball skills and feints were combined with creativity, which he used to get past defenders in one on one situations. This led to the expression "Made in Laudrup" being coined in the Spanish football media, which was widely used in Spain to describe his trademark assists, in particular his lobbed passes, as well as his unique play. According to a 2018 article by Josh Butler of The Athletic and These Football Times, several of Laudrup's teammates said of his creative style of play: "Just run, he will always find a way of passing you the ball."

=== Reception ===
Throughout his career, Laudrup was often ranked among the best players in the world, with the French three-time European footballer of the year award winner Michel Platini describing him as one of the most talented players ever, only lamenting his lack of selfishness causing him to score too few goals. In a 2006 interview, Laudrup's Real Madrid teammate Raúl called him the best player he had ever played with, a view echoed by his Barcelona teammate Romário, who opined that he was able to create and score goals almost at will, and ranked him the fourth-best player in the history of the game (behind Pelé, Diego Maradona and himself). Luís Figo instead labelled Laudrup as arguably the best opponent he had ever faced. Ronald Koeman rated Laudrup as "possibly the most skillful and elegant player [he] ever played with", adding: "Few could dribble like he could. He could sense when a game was ready to be seized and transformed by a moment of individual brilliance." Roberto Galia stated in 2008: "I have played against Maradona, Platini and Baggio. But the player I saw do the most indescribable things was Michael Laudrup." Former teammate Guillermo Amor said: "I have never seen a better player in one-on-ones. He was our special player." Diego Maradona stated: "Michael is one of the greatest. If you ask if there is a new Maradona, you also have to ask if there is a new Laudrup. The answer is no."

Thierry Henry named Laudrup as the best player he had never played with, saying he did not know any better passer than him and "the world of football did not give him the credit that guy [Laudrup] deserved." John Toshack ranked Laudrup as "the best player of his generation", likening him to Cruyff both as a player and a manager, a view shared by Franz Beckenbauer, who dubbed Laudrup the best player of the 90s. Javier Clemente once stated: "To me, Michael Laudrup is the most genius player the world has ever seen. He will always be my numero uno. Always." José Mari Bakero instead remarked: "No one has given the club [Barcelona] as much inspiration as Michael. We all look up to him. It is a privilege to have your day enriched by a genius." In 2012, Ian Rush described him as "an incredible player", who "probably had the most individual skill" he had ever seen. Daniel Storey of Planet Football stated in 2020 that he believed that Laudrup was one of the most underrated players of the previous 30 years, a view shared by Albert Ferrer, who stated in 2009: "Few people made me enjoy the game as much as Michael. Maybe he didn't get the media recognition he deserved, but he was so classy and a real thinker. A master of the blind pass and impossible through-balls and I will never forget his 'spoon' pass in a game against Osasuna. He lifted the ball right over the defence and Romario touched it in first time."

In Barcelona, Laudrup played alongside Hristo Stoichkov, who scored many goals from Laudrup's passes. Regarding Laudrup's ability to create chances for his teammates, he commented in his 2008 autobiography: "From more than hundred goals that I scored I'm sure that over 50 were assisted by Michael. To play with him was extremely easy. We found each other by intuition on the field and found common football language. Look at Iván Zamorano. Laudrup went there [Real] and Zamorano is a goalscorer. Sometimes I envy Ivan for the passes he receives. Passes on foot after you accelerated. Few people understand football like the Danish player. He can only be compared with Maradona, Schuster or Roberto Baggio. They make things easy and find the right solutions. For them [it] is simple, for the opponent – unthinkable. Phenomenal! His only problem is his character. He is emotional and terribly reserved. This affects him a lot, because he takes everything personally – no matter if someone tells him something or decision that he does not agree. His relations with Cruyff were delicate because he couldn't take the critics. I listen to him but I don't care that much. For Michael this was fatal. He couldn't take it anymore so he left without a word." That same year, in an interview with FourFourTwo, Stoichkov included Laudrup in his "Perfect XI", and labelled him as: "One of the best European players I've ever seen", and as a player who was "up there with the greats". He went on to describe him as: "An elegant, old-fashioned playmaker", who "did things few other footballers could do". In 2010, he instead said that "Laudrup was the greatest."

Another striker who benefitted from Laudrup's playmaking abilities was Real Madrid teammate Iván Zamorano, who called Laudrup "El Genio" ("The Genius", in Spanish) during Laudrup's time in the Spanish capital. Zamorano was going through a hard spell in Madrid, but when Laudrup arrived to assist his goals, Zamorano immediately became the top goalscorer of La Liga, winning the pichichi trophy; Zamorano himself credited Laudrup for his role in his increased goalscoring output, describing him as a "genius", while also commenting: "...The reason why I make so many goals is Laudrup." He also stated: "Michael was a magician and one of the greatest players ever. He was amazing in one-on-ones too. I always say that Laudrup had three eyes, not two like everyone else. As a forward, I had to be aware all the time, because he could make you a chance out of nothing and you had to be prepared for that moment." Andrés Iniesta, who became known for using Laudrup's signature dribbling move – the croqueta – rated Laudrup as the greatest player of all time.

Throughout his career, his number of assists were almost always the highest of his team. However, despite his talent and reputation as one of the most technically gifted and creative players of his generation, certain players, pundits and managers have questioned Laudrup's work rate, mentality, determination, and consistency throughout his career at times, in particular in his early career. His former Juventus teammate and admirer Michel Platini, for example, once said, "[Laudrup]'s the greatest player in the world, in training", also describing him as "one of the biggest talents ever", while also lamenting that he "never used his talent to its fullest during matches". His former Barcelona manager Johan Cruyff described him as "One of the most difficult players [he had] worked with", adding: "When he gives 80–90% he is still by far the best, but I want 100%, and he rarely does that." In 1998, he stated: "Had Michael been born in a poor ghetto in Brazil or Argentina with the ball being his only way out of poverty he would today be recognised as the biggest genius of the game ever. He had all the abilities to reach it but lacked this ghetto-instinct, which could have driven him there." At Swansea in 2012, Alan Tate commented: "He is still the best player in training at [age] 48 years." This was echoed by Swansea player Danny Graham: "Laudrup was the best player in training by a mile. It was unreal." In addition to his playing ability, Laudrup was known for his good conduct on the pitch and he never received a red card in his career.

== Managerial career ==
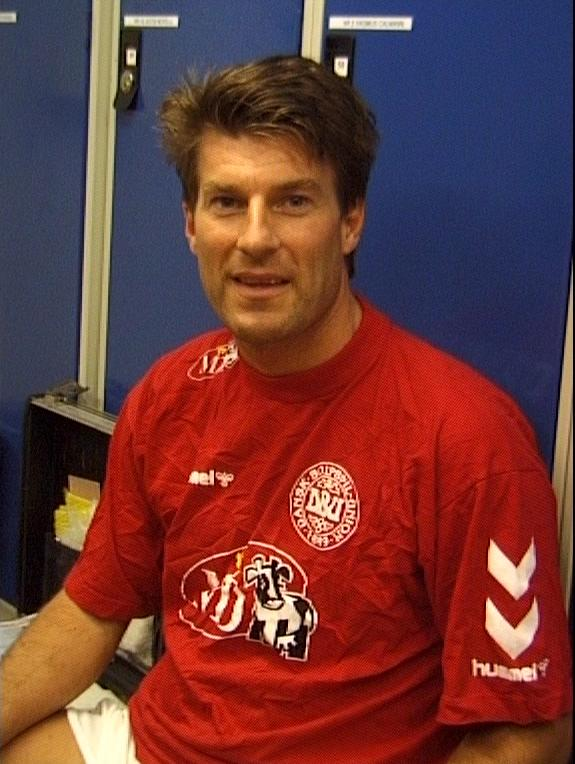
Laudrup during his time as assistant manager of Denmark in 2000

=== Early years ===
After his playing career ended with Ajax, Laudrup became a coach at age 36 when he started serving as an assistant coach for the Denmark national team head coach Morten Olsen in 2000. The national team would play a 4–2–3–1 formation, depending on two fast wingers and with the aim to dominate games with a short-passing possession game. Together, they led Denmark to the knock-out stage of the 2002 World Cup.

=== Brøndby ===
After his success as Denmark assistant manager, Laudrup signed on as manager for Danish Superliga club Brøndby. As his assistant coach, he paired up with former Danish championship winning manager John Jensen, who had played alongside him in the Denmark national team. At the start of his reign, he proclaimed a tactical scheme close to that which Olsen and he had coached at the national team. He renovated the Brøndby team by letting a large contingent of older and experienced players leave, in favour of several new offensive players, and he also gave the chance to young talents from the club's youth scheme.

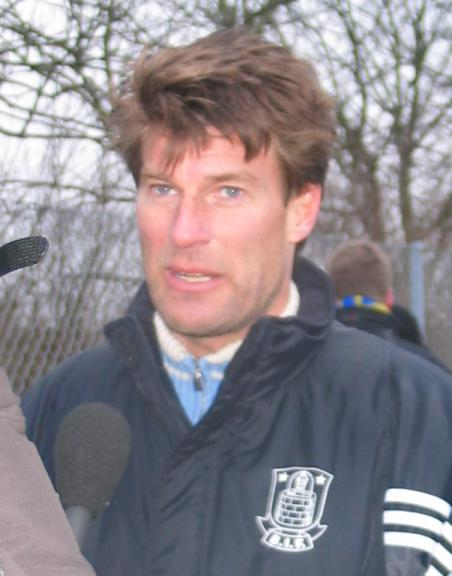
Laudrup as Brøndby manager in 2005

To ensure the defensive strength of the team, Laudrup signed proven national team player Morten Wieghorst. He began his reign as Brøndby manager by winning his first trophy in his managerial career, the 2002 Danish Supercup. In his first season as head coach, he guided the team to win the Danish Cup, after Brøndby beat Midtjylland 3–0 in the final and runners-up in the Danish Superliga. Laudrup's success led him to being voted and awarded the Danish Manager of the Year.

In the following season, he again finished the season runners-up to first place Copenhagen by just one point. However, he would not be denied in the 2004–05 season, where he finally led the team to the Danish Superliga title. In the same season, he also completed The Double after he won his second Danish Cup in four seasons. This saw him being given his second Danish Manager of the Year award. After finishing runners-up in the 2005–06 Danish Superliga, Laudrup announced that he, along with assistant Faxe Jensen, could not come to an agreement for a one-year contract extension that was offered by the club. The pair, after winning four trophies in four seasons, subsequently left Brøndby in June 2006.

Laudrup was associated with several new jobs, including becoming manager of former club Real Madrid and that he would replace Lars Lagerbäck as head coach of the Sweden national team.

In 2007, Brøndby decided to name a new lounge at the stadium "The Michael Laudrup Lounge", with Laudrup's approval. His success led him to being voted and awarded the Danish Manager of the Year.

=== Getafe ===
On 21 June 2007, Laudrup was linked to a move to Madrid-based La Liga club Getafe by sports newspaper Marca. This was confirmed on 9 July 2007. During his stay in Getafe, the club reached the final of the Copa del Rey, losing to Valencia, and the quarter-finals of the UEFA Cup, losing in extra time to Bayern Munich. During his tenure as successor to Bernd Schuster, he brought in a new brand of exciting and free-flowing attacking football to the club, bringing back memories of Laudrup as a player. His team, which was not one of the established powers in Spanish football, enjoyed comparative success. However, he spent only one season as manager, resigning in May 2008.

After Laudrup announced his departure from Getafe, he was linked with jobs at Barcelona, Valencia, Benfica, Chelsea, Blackburn Rovers, Panathinaikos, CSKA Moscow and West Ham United. He almost got the job at Panathinaikos, but according to Danish media, he wanted an option to allow him to leave if he received an offer from a Spanish club. This request was not accepted by the Greeks, who chose to hire Henk ten Cate instead.

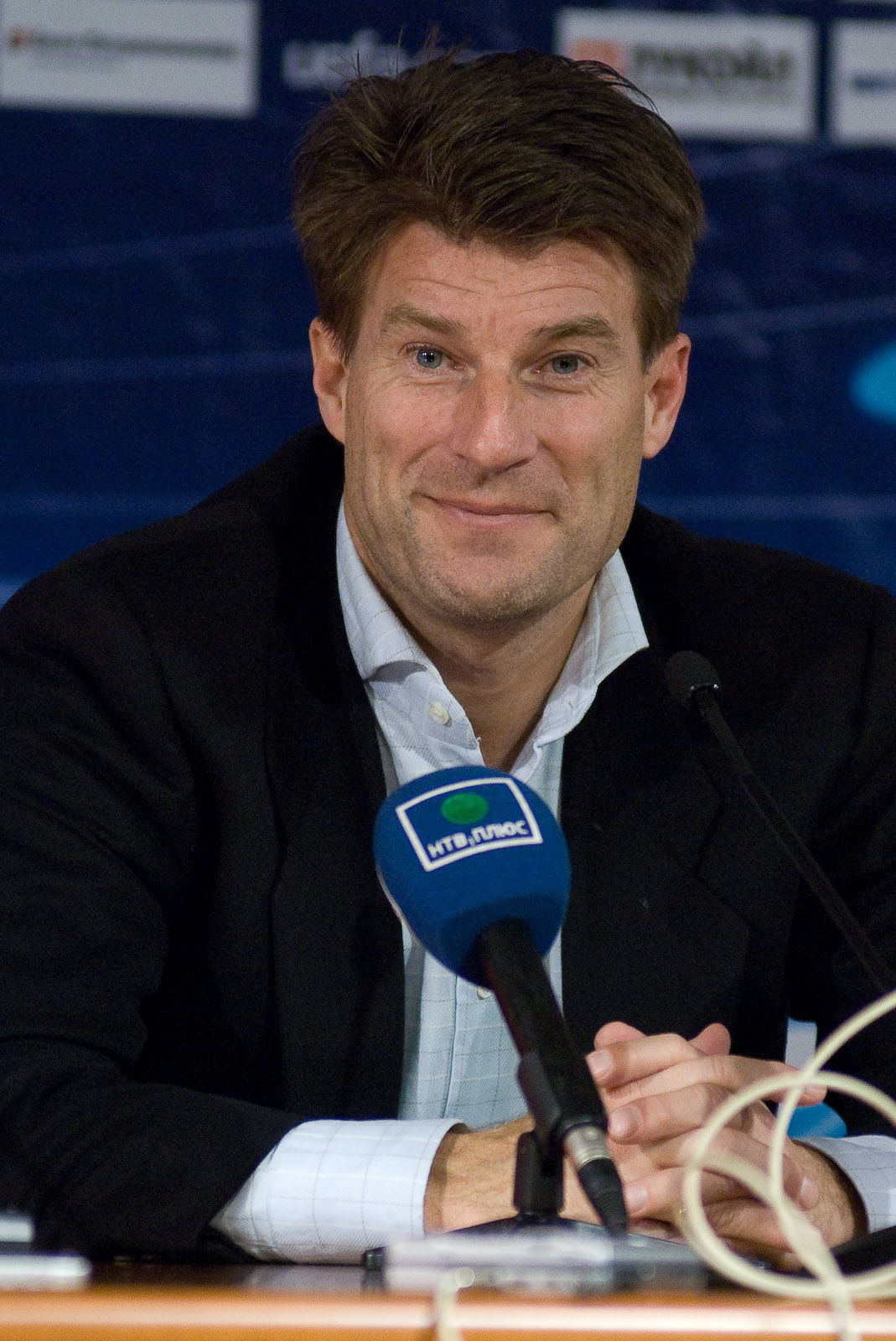
Laudrup at a Champions League press conference in 2008

=== Spartak Moscow ===
On 12 September 2008, it was officially announced that Laudrup had signed a one-and-a-half-year contract to manage Spartak Moscow, replacing Stanislav Cherchesov following his dismissal after a string of poor results. However, Laudrup started on a poor note, winning just one of his first four league matches. He was subsequently sacked on 15 April 2009, just seven months on the job, in the wake of Spartak's quarter-final 3–0 loss to Dynamo Moscow in the Russian Cup. The official statement from Spartak read: "From this point onwards, head coach Michael Laudrup has been relieved of his responsibilities because of unsatisfactory results."

On 22 October 2009, Spanish media announced Laudrup would be appointed as new manager of Spanish side Atlético Madrid, replacing the short and unsuccessful run of Abel Resino, following Atlético's 4–0 UEFA Champions League group stage defeat to Chelsea. However, Laudrup and Atlético were not able to agree on terms and the deal fell apart. The day after, on 23 October, Resino was sacked and Quique Sánchez Flores was appointed as coach as the side's second-choice.

=== Mallorca ===
In July 2010, Laudrup was appointed manager of Mallorca on a contract lasting until the end of June 2012. In his first season, he kept the struggling Mallorca side from relegation, which was suffering from losing many first team players and who was ejected from the UEFA Europa League due to its poor financial situation. At the beginning of the 2011–12 season, on 27 September 2011, Laudrup resigned as manager following the firing of his assistant, Erik Larsen. Laudrup cited great frustration with Lorenzo Serra Ferrer, the club's director of football, leading to a bad work climate as the main reason for his resignation.

=== Swansea City ===
On 15 June 2012, Laudrup was appointed manager of Swansea City on a two-year contract, becoming the first Dane to manage in the Premier League. He made several new signings after arriving at the Liberty Stadium, including Michu, Chico Flores, Pablo Hernández, Jonathan de Guzmán and Ki Sung-yueng. His first competitive match as Swansea manager came as an impressive 0–5 away win at Loftus Road against Queens Park Rangers.

At Swansea, Alan Tate said that Laudrup was considered to be the best player in training, despite being 48 years old. He has been commended for his choice of signings, most notably with Michu, who scored 22 goals in 2012 for Swansea after he signed him for a bargain €2.5 million from Rayo Vallecano. On 23 January 2013, he led Swansea into their first ever major cup final after defeating reigning European champions Chelsea 2–0 on aggregate over two legs in the League Cup semi-finals.

On 7 February 2013, Laudrup appointed former Danish international midfielder Morten Wieghorst as his assistant, after previously signing him as a player when Laudrup was managing Brøndby. Laudrup would later say he "certainly" believes Wieghorst "can be manager" of Swansea, as "he has experience from Scottish football and is familiar with English football". On 24 February, Laudrup said he had no "ambition to become the manager" of a big club, because he could not "have done everything for 10 years" in management and then be fired "after nine months" for not winning any trophies. He also said it gave him "much more pleasure to see how well" he could do where he did not "have to win all the time".

On 24 February 2013, Laudrup won his first trophy with Swansea after his side beat Bradford City 5–0 to win the Football League Cup at Wembley. This was also Swansea's first major trophy in English football in the club's history.

Following Swansea's 1–0 win over Newcastle United on 2 March 2013 the club moved into eighth position in the top-half of the Premier League table, seemingly safe from relegation with 40 points and ten games left; Laudrup said he wanted Swansea to finish eighth, stating that "coming eighth [will be] like winning the league" for the club because he felt "the first seven spots" were already taken by Manchester United, Manchester City, Chelsea, Tottenham Hotspur, Arsenal, Liverpool and Everton. On 3 March, though he had said that his "intention" was "to stay" in south Wales for the next year, Swansea chairman Huw Jenkins said that the club were in the "process of looking for the next manager" of the club, in case Laudrup did choose to leave the club.

On 8 March 2013, Laudrup signed a new contract with Swansea, keeping him at the club until 2015. Reports indicated that he agreed to a contract with a release clause in the region of £5 million, much like the release clause Brendan Rodgers agreed to when he signed a contract extension at the Liberty Stadium four months prior to joining Liverpool. On 10 May, however, he confirmed that his "intention" was to stay at Swansea "next season", saying that reports he wanted to leave Wales was "pure speculation."

On 4 February 2014, Laudrup was sacked by Swansea following a poor run of form, which left the club two points clear of relegation. At the time of the decision, the team had lost six out of their last eight league games.

=== Lekhwiya ===
On 30 June 2014, Laudrup became the new manager of Qatar Stars League champions Lekhwiya after signing a one-year deal. He guided the Lekhwiya to a club-record Qatar Stars League and a Crown Prince Cup double in his first season. The club also qualified for the quarter-finals of the 2015 AFC Champions League during his reign. On 17 June 2015, Laudrup announced that he would not extend his contract, departing the club.

=== Al Rayyan ===
On 3 October 2016, Laudrup was unveiled as the new manager of Al Rayyan on a two-year contract, replacing Jorge Fossati. His first match in charge was on 15 October 2016, when Al Rayyan faced Al Sailiya in an away match in the league, with the match ending in a 1–1 draw.

== Style of management and tactics ==
As assistant manager to Morten Olsen, the Denmark national team employed a 4–2–3–1 system with pacey wingers playing the pivotal role in attack. Laudrup learnt from Olsen and used the same tactical style with Brøndby, with the team becoming more attacking and focused on a short passing style. He continued to employ a similar tactical style when he joined Getafe, ushering a new brand of exciting and free-flowing attacking football to help the club to the Copa del Rey final. However, at Spartak Moscow, he could not adapt his formation and tactics to the Russian game, with the club unable to score enough goals per match.

As Mallorca manager, Laudrup inspired a team that lost a number of key players from relegation by playing an offensive game. In 2012, he joined Swansea City as manager, replacing Brendan Rodgers. Under Rodgers, Swansea were known to play a 4–3–3 approach with a lot of focus on passing, where the full-backs pushed up when in possession and the outfield players played a high tempo pressing game. Under Laudrup, the team began employing a 4–2–3–1 formation, becoming more attacking while retaining the passing, possession, and pressing game. He also signed a number of new players, primarily from La Liga, trying to bring the attacking style from Spain to Wales, which saw more goals scored. He said, "You can get a lot of quality for a reasonable amount in Spain right now."

Laudrup earned plaudits for maintaining their flowing, attacking brand of football and attractive, passing style of play throughout the season, which saw his side win the League Cup, after beating Bradford City a record 5–0 in the final. "You can't ask players to do things that Cristiano Ronaldo and Lionel Messi are doing, but you can ask the easy things," he said. "Sometimes the easiest things in football, a simple pass five or eight yards, can be the most effective. That, everybody can learn."

== Outside of football ==
=== Personal life ===
Michael Laudrup is part of a family with three generations of footballers. His uncle was former Brøndby and Aberdeen manager Ebbe Skovdahl. He is the son of former Danish national team player Finn Laudrup. From his marriage with his first wife, Tina Thunø, Laudrup has a son, Mads. Mads has been the team captain of various Danish youth national teams since January 2005. Today, he is married with Siw Retz Laudrup, with whom he has two children, Andreas and Rebecca. Andreas was selected a part of the under-16 national team in March 2006.

Michael Laudrup has a younger brother, Brian Laudrup, who was also a footballer. Brian Laudrup is the record holder of Danish player of the year awards with four, and was rated by FIFA as the fifth-best player in the world in 1992. Brian Laudrup was in the Euro 1992 Team of the Tournament and World Cup 98 Team of the Tournament. Brian was also known for his part in the Rangers squad which won nine consecutive titles in the 1990s. Brian was a part of the trophy-winning Danish national team at UEFA Euro 1992, but Michael did not play in that championship due to differences with the national team coach Richard Møller Nielsen. In 2004, both the Laudrup brothers were named in the FIFA 100, a list of the 125 greatest living footballers chosen by Pelé as part of the celebration of FIFA's 100th anniversary.

=== Politics and business ===
Alongside his professional football career, Laudrup began importing Spanish wine to Denmark in 1993. Initially, the wine import was sort of a hobby, but business grew rapidly and today his company, Laudrup Vin og Gastronomi, has over ten employees, runs a Wine Academy and imports wines from all over the world.

In 2004, Laudrup was one of the founders of CEPOS, a Danish classical liberal/free-market conservative think-tank.

== Career statistics ==
=== Club ===
Appearances and goals by club, season and competition
Club	Season	League			National cup (Note: Includes Danish Cup, Coppa Italia, Copa del Rey, Emperor's Cup, KNVB Cup)		League cup (Note: Includes J.League Cup)		Continental		Other		Total	
Club	Season	Division	Apps	Goals	Apps	Goals	Apps	Goals	Apps	Goals	Apps	Goals	Apps	Goals
KB	1981	Danish 1st Division	14	3			–		2	0	–		16	3
Brøndby	1982	Danish 1st Division	24	15			–		–		–		24	15
Brøndby	1983	Danish 1st Division	14	8			–		–		–		14	8
Brøndby	Total		38	23			–		–		–		38	23
Lazio	1983–84	Serie A	30	8	5	0	–		–		–		35	8
Lazio	1984–85	Serie A	30	1	5	3	–		–		–		35	4
Lazio	Total		60	9	10	3	–		–		–		70	12
Juventus	1985–86	Serie A	29	7	6	2	–		6 (Note: Appearances in European Cup)	2	1 (Note: Appearance in Intercontinental Cup)	1	42	12
Juventus	1986–87	Serie A	20	3	6	1	–		4	5	–		30	9
Juventus	1987–88	Serie A	28	0	7	2	–		4 (Note: Appearances in UEFA Cup)	2	–		39	4
Juventus	1988–89	Serie A	26	6	7	2	–		8	3	–		41	11
Juventus	Total		103	16	26	7	–		22	12	1	1	152	36
Barcelona	1989–90	La Liga	33	3	7	2	–		3 (Note: Appearances in European Cup Winners' Cup)	1	1 (Note: Appearance in European Super Cup)	0	44	6
Barcelona	1990–91	La Liga	30	9	5	2	–		7	0	1 (Note: Appearance(s) in Supercopa de España)	0	43	11
Barcelona	1991–92	La Liga	36	13	2	2	–		11 (Note: Appearances in UEFA Champions League)	3	1	0	50	18
Barcelona	1992–93	La Liga	37	10	4	4	–		4	0	4 (Note: Two appearances in Supercopa de España, one appearance in European Super Cup, one appearance in Intercontinental Cup)	0	49	14
Barcelona	1993–94	La Liga	31	5	1	0	–		6	1	2	0	40	6
Barcelona	Total		167	40	19	10	–		31	5	9	0	226	55
Real Madrid	1994–95	La Liga	33	4	2	1	–		5	2	–		40	7
Real Madrid	1995–96	La Liga	29	8	0	0	–		7	0	1	0	36	8
Real Madrid	Total		62	12	2	1	–		12	2	1	0	77	15
Vissel Kobe	1996	Football League	12	5	3	2	–		–		–		15	7
Vissel Kobe	1997	J1 League	3	0	0	0	6	1	–		–		9	1
Vissel Kobe	Total		15	5	3	2	6	1	–		–		24	8
Ajax	1997–98	Eredivisie	21	11	4	0	–		5	2	–		30	13
Career total			479	119	64	23	6	1	72	21	11	1	632	165

=== International ===
Appearances and goals by national team and year
National team	Year	Apps	Goals
Denmark	1982	3	2
Denmark	1983	5	7
Denmark	1984	13	2
Denmark	1985	6	6
Denmark	1986	10	1
Denmark	1987	4	0
Denmark	1988	9	1
Denmark	1989	8	4
Denmark	1990	6	3
Denmark	1991	0	0
Denmark	1992	0	0
Denmark	1993	4	0
Denmark	1994	8	3
Denmark	1995	9	5
Denmark	1996	8	1
Denmark	1997	2	1
Denmark	1998	9	1
Total		104	37

Scores and results list Denmark's goal tally first, score column indicates score after each Laudrup goal.

List of international goals scored by Michael Laudrup
No.	Date	Venue	Opponent	Score	Result	Competition
1	15 June 1982	Ullevaal Stadion, Oslo, Norway	Norway	1–2	1–2	1981–85 Nordic Football Championship
2	27 October 1982	Københavns Idrætspark, Copenhagen, Denmark	Czechoslovakia	1–2	1–3	Friendly
3	22 June 1983	Aarhus Idrætspark, Aarhus, Denmark	Finland	2–0	3–0	1984 Summer Olympics qualification
4	22 June 1983	Aarhus Idrætspark, Aarhus, Denmark	Finland	3–0	3–0	1984 Summer Olympics qualification
5	7 September 1983	Københavns Idrætspark, Copenhagen, Denmark	France	1–0	3–1	Friendly
6	7 September 1983	Københavns Idrætspark, Copenhagen, Denmark	France	3–1	3–1	Friendly
7	12 October 1983	Københavns Idrætspark, Copenhagen, Denmark	Luxembourg	1–0	6–0	UEFA Euro 1984 qualifying
8	12 October 1983	Københavns Idrætspark, Copenhagen, Denmark	Luxembourg	2–0	6–0	UEFA Euro 1984 qualifying
9	12 October 1983	Københavns Idrætspark, Copenhagen, Denmark	Luxembourg	6–0	6–0	UEFA Euro 1984 qualifying
10	8 June 1984	Københavns Idrætspark, Copenhagen, Denmark	Bulgaria	1–0	1–1	Friendly
11	12 September 1984	Københavns Idrætspark, Copenhagen, Denmark	Austria	1–0	3–1	Friendly
12	8 May 1985	Københavns Idrætspark, Copenhagen, Denmark	East Germany	1–0	4–1	Friendly
13	8 May 1985	Københavns Idrætspark, Copenhagen, Denmark	East Germany	2–0	4–1	Friendly
14	5 June 1985	Københavns Idrætspark, Copenhagen, Denmark	Soviet Union	3–1	4–2	1986 FIFA World Cup qualification
15	5 June 1985	Københavns Idrætspark, Copenhagen, Denmark	Soviet Union	4–1	4–2	1986 FIFA World Cup qualification
16	16 October 1985	Ullevaal Stadion, Oslo, Norway	Norway	1–1	5–1	1986 FIFA World Cup qualification
17	13 November 1985	Lansdowne Road, Dublin, Republic of Ireland	Republic of Ireland	2–1	4–1	1986 FIFA World Cup qualification
18	8 June 1986	Estadio Neza 86, Nezahualcóyotl, Mexico	Uruguay	3–1	6–1	1986 FIFA World Cup
19	11 June 1988	Niedersachsenstadion, Hanover, West Germany	Spain	1–1	2–3	UEFA Euro 1988
20	17 May 1989	Københavns Idrætspark, Copenhagen, Denmark	Greece	7–1	7–1	1990 FIFA World Cup qualification
21	14 June 1989	Københavns Idrætspark, Copenhagen, Denmark	Sweden	6–0	6–0	1989 Tri Tournament
22	18 June 1989	Københavns Idrætspark, Copenhagen, Denmark	Brazil	2–0	4–0	1989 Tri Tournament
23	18 June 1989	Københavns Idrætspark, Copenhagen, Denmark	Brazil	3–0	4–0	1989 Tri Tournament
24	6 June 1990	Lerkendal Stadion, Trondheim, Norway	Norway	2–0	2–1	Friendly
25	10 October 1990	Københavns Idrætspark, Copenhagen, Denmark	Faroe Islands	1–0	4–1	UEFA Euro 1992 qualifying
26	10 October 1990	Københavns Idrætspark, Copenhagen, Denmark	Faroe Islands	3–1	4–1	UEFA Euro 1992 qualifying
27	20 April 1994	Parken Stadium, Copenhagen, Denmark	Hungary	1–1	3–1	Friendly
28	20 April 1994	Parken Stadium, Copenhagen, Denmark	Hungary	2–1	3–1	Friendly
29	26 May 1994	Parken Stadium, Copenhagen, Denmark	Sweden	1–0	1–0	Friendly
30	13 January 1995	King Fahd II Stadium, Riyadh, Saudi Arabia	Argentina	1–0	2–0	1995 King Fahd Cup
31	7 June 1995	Parken Stadium, Copenhagen, Denmark	Cyprus	4–0	4–0	UEFA Euro 1996 qualifying
32	16 August 1995	Hrazdan Stadium, Yerevan, Armenia	Armenia	1–0	2–0	UEFA Euro 1996 qualifying
33	6 September 1995	King Baudouin Stadium, Brussels, Belgium	Belgium	1–0	3–1	UEFA Euro 1996 qualifying
34	15 November 1995	Parken Stadium, Copenhagen, Denmark	Armenia	3–1	3–1	UEFA Euro 1996 qualifying
35	24 April 1996	Parken Stadium, Copenhagen, Denmark	Scotland	1–0	2–0	Friendly
36	10 September 1997	Parken Stadium, Copenhagen, Denmark	Croatia	2–0	3–1	1998 FIFA World Cup qualification
37	24 June 1998	Stade de Gerland, Lyon, France	France	1–1	1–2	1998 FIFA World Cup

== Managerial statistics ==
As of 25 July 2018

Team	Nat	From	To	Record							
Team	Nat	From	To	G	W	D	L	GF	GA	GD	Win %
Brøndby	(Denmark)	1 July 2002	30 June 2006	132	76	31	25	237	119	+118	57.58
Getafe	(Spain)	2 July 2007	30 June 2008	59	25	15	19	81	70	+11	42.37
Spartak Moscow	(Russia)	12 September 2008	15 April 2009	14	4	4	6	15	17	−2	28.57
Mallorca	(Spain)	2 July 2010	28 September 2011	42	13	9	20	52	67	−15	30.95
Swansea City	(Wales)	15 June 2012	4 February 2014	84	29	24	31	116	105	+11	34.52
Lekhwiya	(Qatar)	1 July 2014	17 June 2015	41	28	8	5	82	43	+39	68.29
Al Rayyan	(Qatar)	3 October 2016	25 July 2018	73	39	15	19	154	107	+47	53.42
Total				445	214	106	125	737	529	+208	48.09

== Honours ==
=== Player ===
Juventus

- Serie A: 1985–86
- Intercontinental Cup: 1985

Barcelona

- La Liga: 1990–91, 1991–92, 1992–93, 1993–94
- Copa del Rey: 1989–90
- Supercopa de España: 1991, 1992
- European Cup: 1991–92
- UEFA Super Cup: 1992

Real Madrid

- La Liga: 1994–95

Ajax

- Eredivisie: 1997–98
- KNVB Cup: 1997–98

Denmark

- FIFA Confederations Cup: 1995

Individual

- Danish Player of the Year: 1982, 1985
- Don Balón Award – La Liga Best Foreign Player of the Year: 1991–92
- La Liga Team of The Year: 1992, 1993
- ESM Team of the Year: 1994–95
- World XI (Reserve): 1996
- FIFA World Cup All-Star Team: 1998
- Best Foreign Player in Spanish Football in the last 25 years: 1974–1999
- UEFA Golden Player (Greatest Danish Footballer of the last 50 Years): 2003
- FIFA 100
- Denmark's Best Player of All Time: 2006
- Scandinavia Best Player Ever: 2015
- Danish Football Hall of Fame
- World Soccer The Greatest Players of the 20th century: The 100 Greatest Footballers of All Time

=== Manager ===
Brøndby

- Danish Superliga: 2004–05
- Danish Cup: 2002–03, 2004–05
- Danish League Cup: 2005
- Danish Supercup: 2002

Swansea City

- Football League Cup: 2012–13

Lekhwiya

- Qatar Stars League: 2014–15
- Crown Prince Cup: 2014–15

Individual

- Danish Manager of the Year: 2002–03, 2004–05
- Qatar Stars League Manager of the Month: August 2014, December 2014

=== Orders ===
- Order of the Dannebrog: 2000

== See also ==
- List of European association football families
- List of men's footballers with 100 or more international caps

== Films ==
- (in Danish) Jørgen Leth, "Michael Laudrup – en fodboldspiller", Denmark, 1993

== Sources ==
- Jakob Kvist (1996). Ambassadøren – en bog om Michael Laudrup (in Danish). Denmark. ISBN 87-583-1285-4.

Sporting positions
Preceded by Lars Olsen	Denmark captain 1994–1998	Succeeded by Peter Schmeichel
