= Barnabas Imenger (footballer, born 1975) =

Nigerian footballer (1975–2021)

Personal information
- Full name: Barnabas Shikaan Imenger
- Date of birth: 15 May 1975
- Date of death: 22 March 2021 (aged 45)
- Place of death: Makurdi, Nigeria
- Position: Midfielder

Senior career*
Years	Team	Apps	(Gls)
1994–2001	Lobi Bank		

International career
1993–1995	Nigeria	8	(1)

Managerial career
- Lobi Stars
- * Club domestic league appearances and goals

Barnabas Shikaan Imenger (15 May 1975 – 22 March 2021) was a Nigerian football player and manager.

== Career ==
Imenger played as a midfielder for Lobi Bank and the Nigeria national team, making 8 international appearances.

He later managed Lobi Stars.
