= Marc Rieper =

Danish footballer (born 1968)

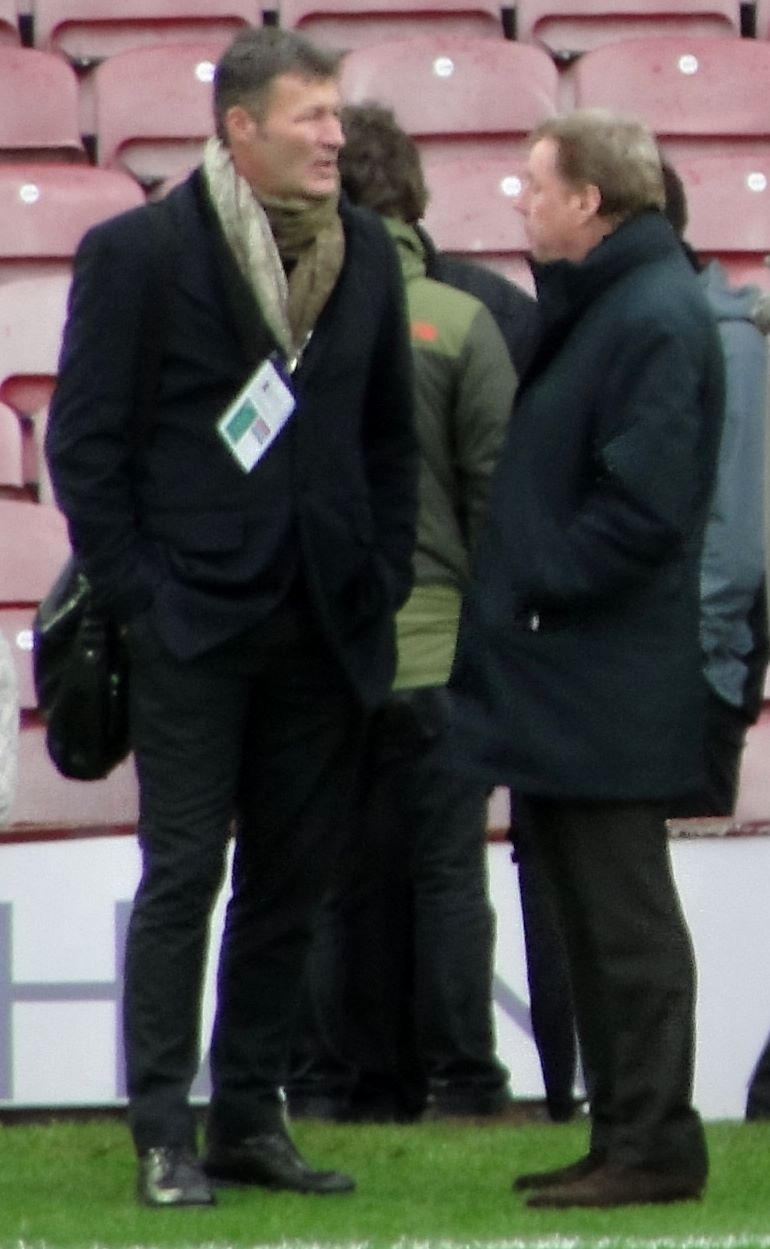
- Rieper (left) with Harry Redknapp in 2016

Personal information
- Full name: Marc Jensen Rieper
- Date of birth: 5 June 1968 (age 58)
- Place of birth: Rødovre, Denmark
- Height: 1.91 m (6 ft 3 in)
- Position: Centre-back

Senior career*
Years	Team	Apps	(Gls)
1988–1992	AGF	85	(3)
1992–1994	Brøndby	93	(3)
1994–1995	→ West Ham United (loan)	21	(1)
1995–1997	West Ham United	69	(4)
1997–2000	Celtic	37	(2)
Total		305	(13)

International career
1988–1989	Denmark u-21	4	(0)
1990–1998	Denmark	61	(2)

Managerial career
- 2000: Celtic (assistant)
- 2001–2002: AGF (assistant)
Medal record
Men's football
Representing Denmark
FIFA Confederations Cup
Winner	1995 Saudi Arabia
CONMEBOL–UEFA Cup of Champions
Runner-up	1993 Argentina
- * Club domestic league appearances and goals

Marc Jensen Rieper (Danish pronunciation: [ˈmɑːk ˈʁiː.pʰɐ]; born 5 June 1968) is a Danish former professional footballer who played as a centre-back for AGF and Brøndby in Denmark, West Ham United in England and Celtic in Scotland. He was also a regular player in the Denmark national team, appearing in the Euro 1996 and 1998 FIFA World Cup tournaments. He is the older brother of footballer Mads Rieper.

== Club career ==
Born in Rødovre, Rieper started his career at Danish club AGF in 1988. While at AGF, he debuted for the Danish national team in the 1–0 friendly match win against Sweden on 5 September 1990. He played a further three national team matches before moving on to Danish Superliga rivals Brøndby IF in 1992. While at Brøndby, he secured a place in the national team starting line-up and played 38 matches in a row from October 1992 to August 1996.

Rieper won the 1994 Danish Cup trophy with Brøndby before moving abroad in December that year to play for English Premiership club West Ham United, signing initially on loan before a £1 million fee at the end of the season made the transfer permanent.

In 1997, he moved to Scotland to play for Celtic, with whom he won the Scottish league championship in 1997–98. Rieper suffered a toe injury in October 1998 which he never fully recovered from. He did not make another professional appearance and announced his retirement in July 2000.

== International career ==
Rieper played 61 matches and scored two goals for the Denmark national team, first as the defensive partner of Lars Olsen and most prominently as part of a defending duo with Jes Høgh in the UEFA Euro 1996 and 1998 FIFA World Cup tournaments. He was ever-present for the Danish team which won the 1995 King Fahd Cup and played in all of Denmark's three matches at UEFA Euro 1996. At the 1998 FIFA World Cup, Rieper played full-time for the Danish national team, and scored against Saudi Arabia. Denmark's World Cup campaign ended in a quarter-final defeat to eventual runners-up Brazil.

== Post-playing career ==
Following his retirement, Rieper spent some time in 2001 as an assistant coach at AGF. Through his connections to Celtic, he brought over many reserve team players to AGF, including future Republic of Ireland footballer Liam Miller. After head coach John Stampe was fired in 2002, Rieper resigned from the club. He now owns and runs a hotel in the town of Aarhus, is a member of the board of directors at AGF and is the owner of women's online fashion store BA10.dk.

== Honours ==
- Danish Cup 1994
- King Fahd Cup 1995
- Scottish Premier Division 1998
- Scottish League Cup 1997
