= Peter Rasmussen (footballer, born 1967) =

Danish footballer (born 1967)

Personal information
- Date of birth: 16 May 1967 (age 59)
- Place of birth: Hobro, Denmark
- Height: 1.80 m (5 ft 11 in)
- Position: Forward

Youth career
- Støvring IF
- Aalborg Chang

Senior career*
Years	Team	Apps	(Gls)
1988–1989	AaB	18	(8)
1989–1991	VfB Stuttgart	16	(1)
1991–1997	AaB	178	(54)
1997–1998	Viborg FF	32	(13)
Total		244	(76)

International career
1986–1987	Denmark U21	3	(1)
1989–1996	Denmark	13	(2)
Medal record
Men's football
Representing Denmark
FIFA Confederations Cup
Winner	1995 Saudi Arabia
- * Club domestic league appearances and goals

Peter Rasmussen (born 16 May 1967) is a Danish former professional footballer who played as a forward. He won the 1995 Danish Superliga with AaB and played 254 games and scored 68 goals in two stints with the club, interrupted by two seasons with VfB Stuttgart in the Bundesliga. He ended his career with Viborg FF in 1998. He played 13 games for the Denmark national team from 1989 to 1996, and scored two goals against Mexico and Argentina as Denmark won the 1995 FIFA Confederations Cup.

== Honours ==
AaB Aalborg

- Danish Superliga: 1994–95

Denmark

- King Fahd Cup: 1995
