= Richard Møller Nielsen =

Danish footballer and manager (1937–2014)

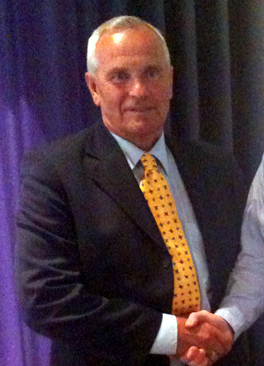
- Nielsen in 2010

Personal information
- Full name: Richard Møller Nielsen
- Date of birth: 19 August 1937
- Place of birth: Store Ubberud, Odense, Denmark
- Date of death: 13 February 2014 (aged 76)
- Place of death: Odense, Denmark
- Position: Defender

Senior career*
Years	Team	Apps	(Gls)
1955–1962	Odense BK	175	(0)
Total		175	(0)

International career
1958	Denmark U21	5	(0)
1959–1961	Denmark B	5	(0)
1959–1961	Denmark	2	(0)

Managerial career
- 1962–1964: Brobyværk IF
- 1964–1968: Odense BK
- 1968–1969: Esbjerg fB
- 1969–1974: Svendborg fB
- 1974–1975: B 1909
- 1975–1985: Odense BK
- 1978–1989: Denmark U21
- 1989: Denmark (futsal)
- 1990–1996: Denmark
- 1996–1999: Finland
- 2000–2002: Israel
- 2003: Kolding FC
Medal record
Men's football
Representing Denmark (as manager)
UEFA European Championship
Winner	1992
FIFA Confederations Cup
Winner	1995
CONMEBOL–UEFA Cup of Champions
Runner-up	1993 Argentina
- * Club domestic league appearances and goals

Richard Møller Nielsen (19 August 1937 – 13 February 2014) was a Danish football player and manager. He played as a defender and spent his entire senior playing career with Odense BK, making 175 appearances between 1955 and 1962. At international level, he represented Denmark at under-21 and B levels, earning two caps for the Denmark senior national team from 1959 to 1961.

After retiring as a player, Nielsen began a long managerial career. He managed several Danish clubs, including Odense BK (in multiple spells), Esbjerg fB, Svendborg fB, and B 1909. He also coached Denmark at youth and senior levels, serving as manager of the Denmark under-21 team from 1978 to 1989 and as assistant manager of the senior national team from 1987 to 1990. In 1990, he was appointed head coach of the senior national team.

Nielsen is best known for leading the national team to victory at the UEFA Euro 1992, securing Denmark's first major international title. He managed the national team until 1996. He later coached the national teams of Finland (1996–1999) and Israel (2000–2002), and had a final managerial spell with Kolding FC in 2003.

In 1995, he was awarded the gold version of the Medal of Merit (Denmark). He was the father of Tommy Møller Nielsen.

== Career ==
Nielsen was mostly known for his career as a football coach, but he played for Odense BK and was capped twice for Denmark as a defender. An injury ended his career.

Nielsen coached, among others, Esbjerg fB, Odense BK and the Danish national youth team under head coach Sepp Piontek. With Esbjerg he won silver medals in the 1968 Danish Championship, and with Odense he won the Danish Cup in 1983. In 1990 Piontek left his position as national coach, and a replacement was required. Nielsen was mentioned early in the race for the job, but the Danish Football Association decided to look abroad for a new coach. They selected German Horst Wohlers as the new Danish coach, but he was unable to cancel his contract with German club Bayer Uerdingen, so Nielsen was appointed.

He took over after the successful and well-liked Sepp Piontek. Many profiles from the so-called "Danish Dynamite" period had retired, such as Allan Simonsen and Preben Elkjær.

=== European champions ===
The first aim for Nielsen was to qualify for the Euro 1992 in Sweden. Denmark started out with a secure home victory against the Faroe Islands, followed by an away draw against Northern Ireland and a 2–0 home loss against Yugoslavia. Several players left the squad including Michael Laudrup, Brian Laudrup and Jan Heintze over disagreement over the tactical style, and several newspapers were demanding that Richard Møller Nielsen step down. Despite the criticism, the team won the rest of their games in the group, including a 2–1 away win against Yugoslavia. It was, however, not enough to qualify. The Danish team finished second in the group just behind Yugoslavia.

However, UEFA banned Yugoslavia from participating in the championship as a result of the Yugoslav wars, and Denmark was chosen as the replacement because the team had finished second behind Yugoslavia in the qualification group. The Danish team started out with a 0–0 against England and a defeat against hosts Sweden. A 2–1 win against France ensured Denmark a place in the semifinals. The defending European champions, the Netherlands, were the next opponents. The match finished 2–2 in regular time and with a 5–4 win in the penalty shoot-out, Denmark secured a place in the final against reigning world champions Germany. Denmark won the final 2–0, becoming the highlight of Nielsen's coaching career; he went on to win the "World Manager of the Year" awarded by World Soccer.

=== Confederations Cup winners ===
Denmark started the World Cup qualification for the 1994 FIFA World Cup with three 0–0 draws, before winning 1–0 against Northern Ireland in Belfast. On 25 August 1993, Michael Laudrup made a comeback in a 4–0 victory at home against Lithuania after having reconciled with Nielsen. The comeback of Denmark's most renowned player at the time was not enough to secure qualification. Laudrup never achieved the same success under Nielsen as he had enjoyed during the 1980s with Piontek as coach and Preben Elkjær next to him in attack. The last game of the qualification was away against Spain in Seville, and the home team won 1–0, even though the Danes had been playing 11 against 10 for most of the game.

Nielsen could, however, again secure a trophy for Denmark when they participated in the Confederations Cup in 1995. This time the Danish team beat Argentina 2–0 in the final. Nielsen had several players from the national Danish Superliga in his squad, with players like Peter Schmeichel missing due to obligations with Manchester United.

The Danish team qualified for the Euro 1996 tournament in England, but failed to retain the title. Denmark was knocked out in the group stage, finishing third behind Croatia and Portugal. The team drew with Portugal, lost to Croatia and won against Turkey in the last game. Nielsen left his position after the championship but is still considered the most successful coach of Denmark.

=== Later career ===
Nielsen went on to coach the Finland national team and came close to securing a play-off game for the 1998 FIFA World Cup. The Finnish team also failed to qualify for the Euro 2000 in Belgium and the Netherlands. Despite the missed qualifications, his tenure was still regarded as a success.

In 2000, Nielsen took over as coach of the Israel national team, but Israel did not succeed in securing a place at the 2002 FIFA World Cup. It was Nielsen's last international job. He went on to manage the Danish second division team Kolding FC before retiring in October 2003.

Odense BK has dedicated one of the stands at Odense Stadion to Richard Møller Nielsen Tribunen. The city of Odense has dedicated a square adjacent to the stadium after the city's legendary coach.

== Death ==
Nielsen died on 13 February 2014, following the unsuccessful removal of a brain tumour in September 2013. He was survived by his wife, three children and six grandchildren.

== Managerial statistics ==
Team	From	To	Record				
Team	From	To	G	W	D	L	Win %
Denmark	1990	1996	62	33	17	12	53.23
Finland	1996	1999	18	4	6	8	22.22
Israel	2000	2002	19	7	4	8	36.84
Total			99	44	27	28	44.44

== Managerial honours ==
=== Club ===
Odense BK

- Danish 1st Division: 1977, 1982
- Danish Cup: 1983

=== International ===
Denmark

- UEFA European Championship: 1992
- King Fahd Cup: 1995

=== Individual ===
- World Soccer Manager of the Year: 1992
- Finnish Football's: 2012
- Danish Coach of the Year: 1975
- Danish Football Hall of Fame: 2014 (posthumously)
