= 1995 King Fahd Cup =

كأس الملك فهد 1995

Tournament details
- Host country: Saudi Arabia
- City: Riyadh
- Dates: 6–13 January
- Teams: 6 (from 5 confederations)
- Venue: 1 (in 1 host city)

Final positions
- Champions: Denmark (1st title)
- Runners-up: Argentina
- Third place: Mexico
- Fourth place: Nigeria

Tournament statistics
- Matches played: 8
- Goals scored: 19 (2.38 per match)
- Attendance: 165,000 (20,625 per match)
- Top scorer: (Mexico) Luis García (3 goals)
- Best player: (Denmark) Brian Laudrup

The 1995 King Fahd Cup (Arabic: كأس الملك فهد) was the second and last tournament held under the King Fahd Cup name before the competition was retroactively sanctioned by FIFA and recognized as FIFA Confederations Cup. Held as the King Fahd Cup, in honor of the then Saudi ruler who organized the tournament with his country's federation (thus in the form of an unofficial tournament), it was hosted by Saudi Arabia in January 1995. It was won by Denmark, who beat defending champions Argentina 2–0 in the final.

== Qualified teams ==
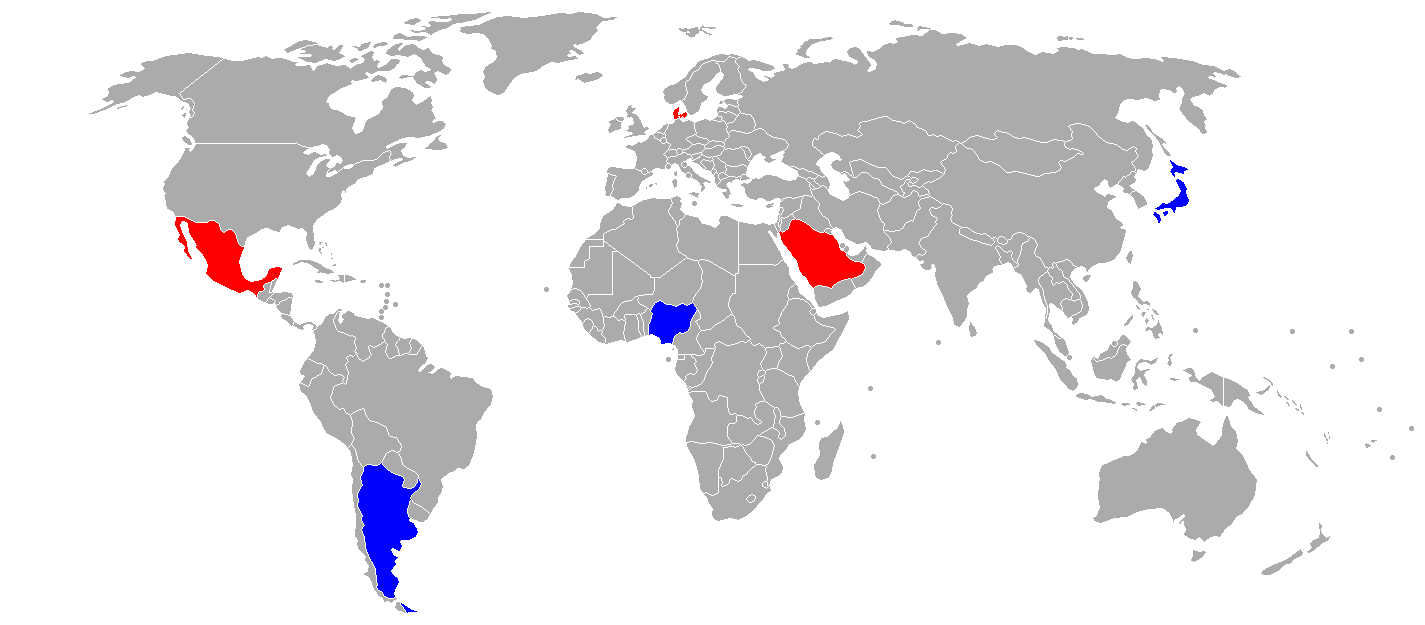
1995 King Fahd Cup participating teams

Team	Confederation	Qualification method	Date qualification secured	Participation no.
Saudi Arabia	AFC	Hosts	—N/a	2nd
Denmark	UEFA	UEFA Euro 1992 winners	26 June 1992	1st
Japan	AFC	1992 AFC Asian Cup winners	8 November 1992	1st
Argentina	CONMEBOL	1993 Copa América winners	4 July 1993	2nd
Mexico	CONCACAF	1993 CONCACAF Gold Cup winners	25 July 1993	1st
Nigeria	CAF	1994 African Cup of Nations winners	10 April 1994	1st

== Venue ==
All matches were played at the 67,000-capacity King Fahd II Stadium in Riyadh, Saudi Arabia.

== Match referees ==
Africa

- (Mauritius) Lim Kee Chong

Asia

- (United Arab Emirates) Ali Bujsaim

Europe

- (Romania) Ion Crăciunescu

North America, Central America and Caribbean

- (Costa Rica) Rodrigo Badilla

South America

- (Chile) Salvador Imperatore

== Group stage ==
=== Group A ===
Team	Pld	W	D	L	GF	GA	GD	Pts
Denmark	2	1	1	0	3	1	+2	4
Mexico	2	1	1	0	3	1	+2	4
Saudi Arabia	2	0	0	2	0	4	−4	0

6 January 1995
18:15 AST

Saudi Arabia	0–2	Mexico
	Report	L. García 65', 82'

King Fahd II Stadium, Riyadh
Attendance: 25,000
Referee: Salvador Imperatore (Chile)

8 January 1995
18:15 AST

Saudi Arabia	0–2	Denmark
	Report	B. Laudrup 43'; Wieghorst 90'

King Fahd II Stadium, Riyadh
Attendance: 10,000
Referee: Lim Kee Chong (Mauritius)

10 January 1995
18:15 AST

Denmark	1–1	Mexico
Rasmussen 48'	Report	L. García 25'
Penalties
Schjønberg (penalty scored); M. Laudrup (penalty scored); J. Høgh (penalty scored); Rieper (penalty scored)	4–2	(penalty scored) Suárez; (penalty missed) Bernal; (penalty scored) Del Olmo; (penalty missed) L. García

King Fahd II Stadium, Riyadh
Attendance: 20,000
Referee: Salvador Imperatore (Chile)

=== Group B ===
Team	Pld	W	D	L	GF	GA	GD	Pts
Argentina	2	1	1	0	5	1	+4	4
Nigeria	2	1	1	0	3	0	+3	4
Japan	2	0	0	2	1	8	−7	0

6 January 1995
01:00 AST

Japan	0–3	Nigeria
	Report	Siasia 4'; Adepoju 55'; Amokachi 65'

King Fahd II Stadium, Riyadh
Attendance: 25,000
Referee: Ion Crăciunescu (Romania)

8 January 1995
20:00 AST

Japan	1–5	Argentina
Miura 57'	Report	Rambert 31'; Ortega 45'; Batistuta 47', 86' (pen.); Chamot 54'

King Fahd II Stadium, Riyadh
Attendance: 10,000
Referee: Rodrigo Badilla (Costa Rica)

10 January 1995
01:00 AST

Nigeria	0–0	Argentina
	Report

King Fahd II Stadium, Riyadh
Attendance: 20,000
Referee: Ali Bujsaim (United Arab Emirates)

== Third place play-off ==
13 January 1995
18:00 AST

Mexico	1–1	Nigeria
Ramírez 20'	Report	Amokachi 31'
Penalties
García Aspe (penalty scored); García (penalty scored); Galindo (penalty scored); Hermosillo (penalty scored); Suárez (penalty scored)	5–4	(penalty scored) Okocha; (penalty scored) Adepoju; (penalty scored) Eguavoen; (penalty scored) Iroha; (penalty missed) Amunike

King Fahd International Stadium, Riyadh
Attendance: 20,000
Referee: Ion Crăciunescu (Romania)

Mexico	Nigeria

GK	1	Jorge Campos	(yellow card) 79'
DF	2	Claudio Suárez
DF	4	Ignacio Ambríz		(substituted off) 89'
DF	21	Raúl Gutiérrez
MF	5	Ramón Ramírez
MF	6	Marcelino Bernal	(yellow card) 83'
MF	8	Alberto García Aspe	(yellow card) 15'
MF	9	Jorge Rodríguez
MF	14	Joaquín del Olmo	(yellow card) 23'
FW	7	Carlos Hermosillo
FW	10	Luis García	(yellow card) 1'
Substitutions:
MF	17	Benjamín Galindo		(substituted on) 89'
Manager:
Miguel Mejía Barón

GK	1	Peter Rufai
DF	2	Augustine Eguavoen	(yellow card) 22'
DF	3	Benedict Iroha	(yellow card) 47'
DF	5	Uche Okechukwu
DF	20	Uche Okafor
MF	8	Mutiu Adepoju
MF	10	Jay-Jay Okocha
MF	11	Emmanuel Amunike
FW	9	Dominic Iorfa		(substituted off) 73'
FW	12	Samson Siasia
FW	14	Daniel Amokachi
Substitutions:
MF	7	Barnabas Imenger	(yellow card) 80'	(substituted on) 73'
Manager:
Shuaibu Amodu

== Final ==
The 1995 King Fahd Cup Final was held at King Fahd II Stadium, Riyadh, Saudi Arabia on 13 January 1995. The match was contested by Denmark and the title holders, Argentina. Denmark won their first King Fahd Cup/Confederations Cup title.

13 January 1995
20:15 AST

Denmark	2–0	Argentina
M. Laudrup 8' (pen.); Rasmussen 75'	Report

King Fahd II Stadium, Riyadh
Attendance: 35,000
Referee: Ali Bujsaim (United Arab Emirates)

== Statistics ==
=== Goalscorers ===
With three goals, Luis García was the top scorer in the tournament. In total, 19 goals were scored by 14 different players, with none of them credited as an own goal.

3 goals

- (Mexico) Luis García

2 goals

- (Argentina) Gabriel Batistuta
- (Denmark) Peter Rasmussen
- (Nigeria) Daniel Amokachi

1 goal

- (Argentina) José Chamot
- (Argentina) Ariel Ortega
- (Argentina) Sebastián Rambert
- (Denmark) Brian Laudrup
- (Denmark) Michael Laudrup
- (Denmark) Morten Wieghorst
- (Japan) Kazuyoshi Miura
- (Mexico) Ramón Ramírez
- (Nigeria) Mutiu Adepoju
- (Nigeria) Emmanuel Amunike

=== Tournament ranking ===
Per statistical convention in football, matches decided in extra time are counted as wins and losses, while matches decided by penalty shoot-outs are counted as draws.

Pos	Grp	Team	Pld	W	D	L	GF	GA	GD	Pts	Final result
1	A	Denmark	3	2	1	0	5	1	+4	7	Champions
2	B	Argentina	3	1	1	1	5	3	+2	4	Runners-up
3	A	Mexico	3	1	2	0	4	2	+2	5	Third place
4	B	Nigeria	3	1	2	0	4	1	+3	5	Fourth place
5	A	Saudi Arabia (H)	2	0	0	2	0	4	−4	0	Eliminated in group stage
6	B	Japan	2	0	0	2	1	8	−7	0	Eliminated in group stage

Source: FIFA
(H) Hosts
