= Denmark at the FIFA World Cup =

International football delegation

The FIFA World Cup is an international association football competition contested by the men's national teams of the members of Fédération Internationale de Football Association (FIFA), the sport's global governing body. The championship has been awarded every four years since the first tournament in 1930, except in 1942 and 1946, due to World War II.

The tournament consists of two parts, the qualification phase and the final phase (officially called the World Cup Finals). The qualification phase, which currently take place over the three years preceding the Finals, is used to determine which teams qualify for the Finals. The current format of the Finals involves 48 teams competing for the title, at venues within the host nation (or nations) over a period of about a month. The World Cup final is the most widely viewed sporting event in the world, with an estimated 715.1 million people watching the 2006 tournament final.

The first time Denmark entered the tournament was for the 1958 edition in Sweden. However, they lost all four of their qualifying matches to England and the Republic of Ireland.

Denmark qualified for the first time in 1986, where they won all three of their group stage matches including a 2–0 victory against title contenders West Germany, but were eliminated by Spain in the next round. Since then, the Danish national team has regularly qualified for FIFA World Cup finals and made their sixth and most recent appearance at Qatar 2022. Their best performance was in 1998, where they reached the quarter-finals.

== Record at the FIFA World Cup ==
=== Overall record ===
| Year | Round | Position | Pld | W | D* | L | GF | GA |
|---|---|---|---|---|---|---|---|---|
| (Uruguay) 1930 | Did not enter | | | | | | | |
| (Italy) 1934 | Did not enter | | | | | | | |
| (France) 1938 | Did not enter | | | | | | | |
| (Brazil) 1950 | Did not enter | | | | | | | |
| (Switzerland) 1954 | Did not enter | | | | | | | |
| (Sweden) 1958 | Did not qualify | | | | | | | |
| (Chile) 1962 | Did not enter | | | | | | | |
| (England) 1966 | Did not qualify | | | | | | | |
| (Mexico) 1970 | Did not qualify | | | | | | | |
| (West Germany) 1974 | Did not qualify | | | | | | | |
| (Argentina) 1978 | Did not qualify | | | | | | | |
| (Spain) 1982 | Did not qualify | | | | | | | |
| (Mexico) 1986 | Round of 16 | 9th | 4 | 3 | 0 | 1 | 10 | 6 |
| (Italy) 1990 | Did not qualify | | | | | | | |
| (United States) 1994 | Did not qualify | | | | | | | |
| (France) 1998 | Quarter-finals | 8th | 5 | 2 | 1 | 2 | 9 | 7 |
| (South Korea) (Japan) 2002 | Round of 16 | 10th | 4 | 2 | 1 | 1 | 5 | 5 |
| (Germany) 2006 | Did not qualify | | | | | | | |
| (South Africa) 2010 | Group stage | 24th | 3 | 1 | 0 | 2 | 3 | 6 |
| (Brazil) 2014 | Did not qualify | | | | | | | |
| (Russia) 2018 | Round of 16 | 11th | 4 | 1 | 3 | 0 | 3 | 2 |
| (Qatar) 2022 | Group stage | 28th | 3 | 0 | 1 | 2 | 1 | 3 |
| (Canada) (Mexico) (United States) 2026 | Did not qualify | | | | | | | |
| (Morocco) (Portugal) (Spain) 2030 | To be determined | | | | | | | |
| (Saudi Arabia) 2034 | To be determined | | | | | | | |
| Total | Quarter-finals | 6/23 | 23 | 9 | 6 | 8 | 31 | 29 |

*Draws include knockout matches decided via penalty shoot-out

=== By match ===
| No. | Date | Round | Opponent | Result | Denmark scorers | Attendance | Record |
|---|---|---|---|---|---|---|---|
| 1 | 4 June 1986 | Group stage | Scotland | 1–0 | Elkjær 57' | 18,000 | 1–0–0 |
| 2 | 8 June 1986 | Group stage | Uruguay | 6–1 | Elkjær (3) 11', 67', 80', Lerby 41', M. Laudrup 52', J. Olsen 88' | 26,500 | 2–0–0 |
| 3 | 13 June 1986 | Group stage | West Germany | 2–0 | J. Olsen 43' (pen.), J. Eriksen 62' | 36,000 | 3–0–0 |
| 4 | 18 June 1986 | Round of 16 | Spain | 1–5 | J. Olsen 33' (pen.) | 38,500 | 3–0–1 |
| 5 | 12 June 1998 | Group stage | Saudi Arabia | 1–0 | Rieper 69' | 38,140 | 4–0–1 |
| 6 | 18 June 1998 | Group stage | South Africa | 1–1 | Nielsen 12' | 33,300 | 4–1–1 |
| 7 | 24 June 1998 | Group stage | France | 1–2 | M. Laudrup 42' (pen.) | 39,100 | 4–1–2 |
| 8 | 28 June 1998 | Round of 16 | Nigeria | 4–1 | Møller 3', B. Laudrup 12', Sand 60', Helveg 76' | 77,100 | 5–1–2 |
| 9 | 3 July 1998 | Quarter final | Brazil | 2–3 | Mar. Jørgensen 2', B. Laudrup 50' | 77,100 | 5–1–3 |
| 10 | 1 June 2002 | Group stage | Uruguay (2) | 2–1 | Tomasson (2) 45', 83' | 30,157 | 6–1–3 |
| 11 | 6 June 2002 | Group stage | Senegal | 1–1 | Tomasson 16' (pen.) | 43,500 | 6–2–3 |
| 12 | 11 June 2002 | Group stage | France (2) | 2–0 | Rommedahl 22', Tomasson 67' | 48,100 | 7–2–3 |
| 13 | 15 June 2002 | Round of 16 | England | 0–3 | — | 40,582 | 7–2–4 |
| 14 | 14 June 2010 | Group stage | Netherlands | 0–2 | — | 83,465 | 7–2–5 |
| 15 | 19 June 2010 | Group stage | Cameroon | 2–1 | Bendtner 33', Rommedahl 61' | 38,074 | 8–2–5 |
| 16 | 24 June 2010 | Group stage | Japan | 1–3 | Tomasson 81' | 27,967 | 8–2–6 |
| 17 | 16 June 2018 | Group stage | Peru | 1–0 | Poulsen 59' | 40,502 | 9–2–6 |
| 18 | 21 June 2018 | Group stage | Australia | 1–1 | C. Eriksen 7' | 40,727 | 9–3–6 |
| 19 | 26 June 2018 | Group stage | France (3) | 0–0 | — | 78,011 | 9–4–6 |
| 20 | 1 July 2018 | Round of 16 | Croatia | 1–1 (a.e.t.) (Note: Denmark lost in the penalty shoot-out) | Mat. Jørgensen 1' | 40,851 | 9–5–6 |
| 21 | 22 November 2022 | Group stage | Tunisia | 0–0 | — | 42,925 | 9–6–6 |
| 22 | 26 November 2022 | Group stage | France (4) | 1–2 | A. Christensen 68' | 42,860 | 9–6–7 |
| 23 | 30 November 2022 | Group stage | Australia (2) | 0–1 | — | 41,232 | 9–6–8 |

== Summary ==
=== 1986 FIFA World Cup ===
Denmark made their first World Cup appearance in the 1986 World Cup, and with the attacking duo of Michael Laudrup and Preben Elkjær. In their first match against Scotland, Denmark won 1–0 with the only goal coming from Preben Elkjær after he burst into the penalty area before shooting left-footed low into the right corner of the net. The team surprised the world, sweeping the group, including a 6–1 thrashing of Uruguay. In the second round, Denmark faced Spain losing 5–1 on the strength of four Emilio Butragueño goals; the first Spain goal was caused by a miss-timed backpass by Jesper Olsen to Butragueño, an unfortunate action subsequently coined as "a real Jesper Olsen" ("en rigtig Jesper Olsen"). The phrase would live on for 13 years and was repeated by the Danish TV commentators in 1999, when an identical backpass was carried out by Jesper Grønkjær to Filippo Inzaghi on the former's debut for Denmark.

| Pos | Team | Pld | W | D | L | GF | GA | GD | Pts | Qualification |
|---|---|---|---|---|---|---|---|---|---|---|
| 1 | Denmark | 3 | 3 | 0 | 0 | 9 | 1 | +8 | 6 | Advance to knockout stage |
| 2 | West Germany | 3 | 1 | 1 | 1 | 3 | 4 | −1 | 3 | Advance to knockout stage |
| 3 | Uruguay | 3 | 0 | 2 | 1 | 2 | 7 | −5 | 2 | Advance to knockout stage |
| 4 | Scotland | 3 | 0 | 1 | 2 | 1 | 3 | −2 | 1 | |

Source: FIFA
4 June 1986 (first round)
16:00 CST

| Scotland | 0–1 | Denmark |
|---|---|---|
| | Report | Elkjær 57' |

Estadio Neza 86, Nezahualcóyotl
Attendance: 18,000
Referee: Lajos Nemeth (Hungary)

| GK | 1 | Jim Leighton |
| DF | 2 | Richard Gough |
| DF | 3 | Maurice Malpas |
| DF | 5 | Alex McLeish |
| DF | 6 | Willie Miller |
| DF | 13 | Steve Nicol |
| MF | 8 | Roy Aitken |
| MF | 4 | Graeme Souness (c) |
| MF | 7 | Gordon Strachan | (substituted off) 74' |
| FW | 19 | Charlie Nicholas |
| FW | 20 | Paul Sturrock | (substituted off) 61' |
Substitutions:
| MF | 16 | Frank McAvennie | (substituted on) 61' |
| FW | 9 | Eamonn Bannon | (substituted on) 74' |
Manager:
(Scotland) Alex Ferguson

| GK | 1 | Troels Rasmussen |
| DF | 3 | Søren Busk |
| DF | 4 | Morten Olsen (c) |
| DF | 5 | Ivan Nielsen |
| DF | 13 | Jens Jørn Bertelsen |
| MF | 6 | Søren Lerby |
| MF | 8 | Jesper Olsen | | (substituted off) 80' |
| MF | 15 | Frank Arnesen | | (substituted off) 74' |
| MF | 11 | Michael Laudrup |
| FW | 9 | Klaus Berggreen | (yellow card) 84' |
| FW | 10 | Preben Elkjær |
Substitutions:
| DF | 2 | John Sivebæk | | (substituted on) 74' |
| MF | 7 | Jan Mølby | | (substituted on) 80' |
Manager:
(West Germany) Sepp Piontek

8 June 1986 (first round)
16:00 CST

| Denmark | 6–1 | Uruguay |
|---|---|---|
| Elkjær 11', 67', 80'; Lerby 41'; M. Laudrup 52'; J. Olsen 88' | Report | Francescoli 45' (pen.) |

Estadio Neza 86, Nezahualcóyotl
Attendance: 26,500
Referee: Antonio Márquez Ramírez (Mexico)

| GK | 1 | Troels Rasmussen |
| DF | 3 | Søren Busk |
| DF | 4 | Morten Olsen (c) |
| DF | 5 | Ivan Nielsen | (yellow card) 7' |
| DF | 21 | Henrik Andersen |
| DF | 12 | Jens Jørn Bertelsen | | (substituted off) 57' |
| MF | 6 | Søren Lerby |
| MF | 15 | Frank Arnesen |
| MF | 11 | Michael Laudrup | | (substituted off) 81' |
| FW | 9 | Klaus Berggreen |
| FW | 10 | Preben Elkjær |
Substitutions:
| MF | 7 | Jan Mølby | | (substituted on) 57' |
| MF | 8 | Jesper Olsen | | (substituted on) 81' |
Manager:
(West Germany) Sepp Piontek

| GK | 12 | Fernando Álvez |
| DF | 2 | Nelson Gutiérrez |
| DF | 3 | Eduardo Acevedo (c) |
| DF | 4 | Víctor Diogo |
| DF | 6 | José Batista |
| MF | 5 | Miguel Bossio | (yellow card) 13' (yellow-red card) 19' |
| MF | 16 | Mario Saralegui |
| MF | 11 | Sergio Santín | | (substituted off) 57' |
| MF | 10 | Enzo Francescoli |
| FW | 9 | Jorge da Silva | (yellow card) 35' |
| FW | 7 | Antonio Alzamendi | | (substituted off) 57' |
Substitutions:
| MF | 17 | José Zalazar | | (substituted on) 57' |
| FW | 19 | Venancio Ramos | | (substituted on) 57' |
Manager:
(Uruguay) Omar Borrás

13 June 1986 (first round)
12:00 CST

| Denmark | 2–0 | West Germany |
|---|---|---|
| J. Olsen 43' (pen.); Eriksen 62' | Report |

Estadio La Corregidora, Querétaro
Attendance: 36,000
Referee: Alexis Ponnet (Belgium)

| GK | 22 | Lars Høgh |
| DF | 2 | John Sivebæk |
| DF | 3 | Søren Busk |
| DF | 4 | Morten Olsen (c) |
| DF | 21 | Henrik Andersen |
| MF | 15 | Frank Arnesen | (yellow card) 36' (yellow-red card) 88' |
| MF | 7 | Jan Mølby |
| MF | 8 | Jesper Olsen | | (substituted off) 71' |
| MF | 6 | Søren Lerby |
| MF | 11 | Michael Laudrup |
| FW | 10 | Preben Elkjær | | (substituted off) 46' |
Substitutions:
| FW | 19 | John Eriksen | | (substituted on) 46' |
| FW | 14 | Allan Simonsen | | (substituted on) 71' |
Manager:
(West Germany) Sepp Piontek

| GK | 1 | Harald Schumacher (c) |
| DF | 4 | Karlheinz Förster | | (substituted off) 71' |
| DF | 5 | Matthias Herget |
| DF | 6 | Norbert Eder | (yellow card) 48' |
| DF | 14 | Thomas Berthold |
| DF | 17 | Ditmar Jakobs | (yellow card) 51' |
| DF | 3 | Andreas Brehme |
| MF | 21 | Wolfgang Rolff | | (substituted off) 46' |
| MF | 8 | Lothar Matthäus |
| FW | 19 | Klaus Allofs |
| FW | 9 | Rudi Völler |
Substitutions:
| MF | 7 | Pierre Littbarski | | (substituted on) 46' |
| FW | 11 | Karl-Heinz Rummenigge | | (substituted on) 71' |
Manager:
(West Germany) Franz Beckenbauer

18 June 1986 (round of 16)
16:00 CST

| Denmark | 1–5 | Spain |
|---|---|---|
| J. Olsen 33' (pen.) | Report | Butragueño 43', 56', 80', 88' (pen.); Goikoetxea 68' (pen.) |

Estadio La Corregidora, Querétaro
Attendance: 38,500
Referee: Jan Keizer (Netherlands)

| GK | 22 | Lars Høgh |
| DF | 3 | Søren Busk |
| DF | 4 | Morten Olsen (c) |
| DF | 5 | Ivan Nielsen |
| DF | 21 | Henrik Andersen | (yellow card) 26' | (substituted off) 60' |
| DF | 12 | Jens Jørn Bertelsen |
| MF | 8 | Jesper Olsen | | (substituted off) 71' |
| MF | 6 | Søren Lerby |
| MF | 11 | Michael Laudrup |
| FW | 9 | Klaus Berggreen |
| FW | 10 | Preben Elkjær |
Substitutions:
| FW | 19 | John Eriksen | | (substituted on) 60' |
| MF | 7 | Jan Mølby | | (substituted on) 71' |
Manager:
(West Germany) Sepp Piontek

| GK | 1 | Andoni Zubizarreta |
| DF | 2 | Tomás |
| DF | 3 | José Antonio Camacho (c) | (yellow card) 32' |
| DF | 5 | Víctor |
| DF | 8 | Andoni Goikoetxea | (yellow card) 27' |
| MF | 14 | Ricardo Gallego |
| MF | 11 | Julio Alberto |
| MF | 18 | Ramón Calderé |
| MF | 21 | Míchel | (yellow card) 60' | (substituted off) 83' |
| FW | 19 | Julio Salinas | | (substituted off) 46' |
| FW | 9 | Emilio Butragueño |
Substitutions:
| FW | 20 | Eloy | | (substituted on) 46' |
| MF | 17 | Francisco | | (substituted on) 83' |
Manager:
(Spain) Miguel Muñoz

=== 1998 FIFA World Cup ===
Under coach Bo "Bosse" Johansson, the 1998 FIFA World Cup saw the revival of the Danish team, starring both Laudrup brothers in their last international campaign. After beating Saudi Arabia 1–0, drawing with South Africa and losing 2–1 to later champions France in mediocre games, the Danish team qualified to the knockout stages as second in the group. In the next game however, Denmark played some of the best football of the entire tournament, beating Nigeria 4–1 in a fantastic game. In the quarter-final against Brazil, the Danes went out with a beautiful 2–3 defeat to the later silver medalists, in a very close and emotional game.

| Pos | Team | Pld | W | D | L | GF | GA | GD | Pts | Qualification |
|---|---|---|---|---|---|---|---|---|---|---|
| 1 | France (H) | 3 | 3 | 0 | 0 | 9 | 1 | +8 | 9 | Advance to knockout stage |
| 2 | Denmark | 3 | 1 | 1 | 1 | 3 | 3 | 0 | 4 | Advance to knockout stage |
| 3 | South Africa | 3 | 0 | 2 | 1 | 3 | 6 | −3 | 2 | |
| 4 | Saudi Arabia | 3 | 0 | 1 | 2 | 2 | 7 | −5 | 1 | |

Source: FIFA
(H) Hosts
12 June 1998 (first round)
17:30

| Saudi Arabia | 0–1 | Denmark |
|---|---|---|
| | Report | Rieper 69' |

Stade Félix Bollaert, Lens
Attendance: 38,140
Referee: Javier Castrilli (Argentina)

Saudi Arabia

Denmark

| GK | 1 | Mohamed Al-Deayea |
| DF | 2 | Mohammed Al-Jahani |
| DF | 3 | Mohammed Al-Khilaiwi |
| DF | 4 | Abdullah Zubromawi |
| DF | 13 | Hussein Sulaimani |
| MF | 6 | Fuad Amin (c) | | (substituted off) 78' |
| MF | 7 | Ibrahim Al-Shahrani |
| MF | 14 | Khalid Al-Muwallid | (yellow card) 11' |
| MF | 16 | Khamis Al-Owairan |
| FW | 9 | Sami Al-Jaber | | (substituted off) 84' |
| FW | 10 | Saeed Al-Owairan | | (substituted off) 79' |
Substitutions:
| MF | 20 | Hamzah Saleh | | (substituted on) 78' |
| FW | 8 | Obeid Al-Dosari | | (substituted on) 79' |
| FW | 15 | Yousuf Al-Thunayan | | (substituted on) 84' |
Manager:
(Brazil) Carlos Alberto Parreira

| GK | 1 | Peter Schmeichel |
| DF | 2 | Michael Schjønberg |
| DF | 3 | Marc Rieper | (yellow card) 60' |
| DF | 4 | Jes Høgh |
| DF | 6 | Thomas Helveg |
| DF | 12 | Søren Colding |
| MF | 10 | Michael Laudrup (c) |
| MF | 14 | Morten Wieghorst | (yellow card) 12' | (substituted off) 65' |
| MF | 21 | Martin Jørgensen | | (substituted off) 73' |
| FW | 11 | Brian Laudrup | | (substituted off) 84' |
| FW | 19 | Ebbe Sand |
Substitutions:
| MF | 7 | Allan Nielsen | (yellow card) 73' | (substituted on) 65' |
| MF | 8 | Per Frandsen | | (substituted on) 73' |
| DF | 5 | Jan Heintze | | (substituted on) 84' |
Manager:
(Sweden) Bo Johansson

Assistant referees:
Claudio Rossi (Argentina)
Jorge Diaz Garcia (Chile)
Fourth official:
Hugh Dallas (Scotland)

18 June 1998 (first round)
17:30

| South Africa | 1–1 | Denmark |
|---|---|---|
| McCarthy 51' | Report | Nielsen 12' |

Stade de Toulouse, Toulouse
Attendance: 33,300
Referee: John Toro Rendón (Colombia)

South Africa

Denmark

| GK | 1 | Hans Vonk |
| DF | 3 | David Nyathi | (yellow card) 28' | (substituted off) 88' |
| DF | 5 | Mark Fish |
| DF | 19 | Lucas Radebe (c) | (yellow card) 73' |
| DF | 21 | Pierre Issa | (yellow card) 63' |
| MF | 7 | Quinton Fortune |
| MF | 10 | John Moshoeu |
| MF | 11 | Helman Mkhalele |
| FW | 9 | Shaun Bartlett | | (substituted off) 77' |
| FW | 12 | Brendan Augustine | | (substituted off) 46' |
| FW | 17 | Benni McCarthy |
Substitutions:
| MF | 8 | Alfred Phiri | (yellow card) 65' (red card) 68' | (substituted on) 46' |
| FW | 6 | Phil Masinga | | (substituted on) 77' |
| FW | 13 | Delron Buckley | | (substituted on) 88' |
Manager:
(France) Philippe Troussier

| GK | 1 | Peter Schmeichel | (yellow card) 57' |
| DF | 2 | Michael Schjønberg | (yellow card) 23' | (substituted off) 82' |
| DF | 3 | Marc Rieper |
| DF | 4 | Jes Høgh | (yellow card) 56' |
| DF | 6 | Thomas Helveg |
| DF | 12 | Søren Colding |
| MF | 7 | Allan Nielsen |
| MF | 10 | Michael Laudrup (c) | | (substituted off) 58' |
| MF | 21 | Martin Jørgensen |
| FW | 11 | Brian Laudrup |
| FW | 19 | Ebbe Sand | | (substituted off) 58' |
Substitutions:
| DF | 5 | Jan Heintze | | (substituted on) 58' |
| FW | 9 | Miklos Molnar | (red card) 66' | (substituted on) 58' |
| MF | 14 | Morten Wieghorst | (red card) 85' | (substituted on) 82' |
Manager:
(Sweden) Bo Johansson

Assistant referees:
Jorge Luis Arango (Colombia)
Celestino Galván (Paraguay)
Fourth official:
Epifanio González (Paraguay)

24 June 1998 (first round)
16:00

| France | 2–1 | Denmark |
|---|---|---|
| Djorkaeff 12' (pen.); Petit 56' | Report | M. Laudrup 42' (pen.) |

Stade Gerland, Lyon
Attendance: 39,100
Referee: Pierluigi Collina (Italy)

France

Denmark

| GK | 16 | Fabien Barthez |
| DF | 2 | Vincent Candela |
| DF | 8 | Marcel Desailly (c) |
| DF | 18 | Franck Leboeuf |
| MF | 4 | Patrick Vieira | (yellow card) 62' |
| MF | 6 | Youri Djorkaeff |
| MF | 11 | Robert Pires | | (substituted off) 71' |
| MF | 13 | Bernard Diomède | (yellow card) 53' |
| MF | 17 | Emmanuel Petit | | (substituted off) 64' |
| MF | 19 | Christian Karembeu |
| FW | 20 | David Trezeguet | | (substituted off) 85' |
Substitutions:
| MF | 14 | Alain Boghossian | | (substituted on) 64' |
| FW | 12 | Thierry Henry | | (substituted on) 71' |
| FW | 9 | Stéphane Guivarc'h | | (substituted on) 85' |
Manager:
Aimé Jacquet

| GK | 1 | Peter Schmeichel |
| DF | 2 | Michael Schjønberg |
| DF | 3 | Marc Rieper |
| DF | 4 | Jes Høgh |
| DF | 5 | Jan Heintze |
| DF | 6 | Thomas Helveg |
| DF | 13 | Jacob Laursen | | (substituted off) 46' |
| MF | 7 | Allan Nielsen |
| MF | 10 | Michael Laudrup (c) |
| MF | 21 | Martin Jørgensen | | (substituted off) 54' |
| FW | 11 | Brian Laudrup | | (substituted off) 75' |
Substitutions:
| DF | 12 | Søren Colding | (yellow card) 65' | (substituted on) 46' |
| FW | 19 | Ebbe Sand | | (substituted on) 54' |
| MF | 15 | Stig Tøfting | (yellow card) 78' | (substituted on) 75' |
Manager:
(Sweden) Bo Johansson

Assistant referees:
Nimal Wickeramatunge (Belgium)
Emanuel Zammit (Malta)
Fourth official:
Vítor Melo Pereira (Portugal)

28 June 1998 (round of 16)
21:00

| Nigeria | 1–4 | Denmark |
|---|---|---|
| Babangida 78' | Report | Møller 3'; B. Laudrup 12'; Sand 60'; Helveg 76' |

Stade de France, Saint-Denis
Attendance: 77,000
Referee: Urs Meier (Switzerland)

Nigeria

Denmark

| GK | 1 | Peter Rufai |
| RB | 8 | Mutiu Adepoju |
| CB | 5 | Uche Okechukwu (c) |
| CB | 6 | Taribo West |
| LB | 3 | Celestine Babayaro |
| DM | 15 | Sunday Oliseh |
| RM | 7 | Finidi George |
| LM | 11 | Garba Lawal | | (substituted off) 73' |
| AM | 10 | Jay-Jay Okocha | (yellow card) 49' |
| SS | 4 | Nwankwo Kanu | | (substituted off) 65' |
| CF | 20 | Victor Ikpeba |
Substitutes:
| FW | 9 | Rashidi Yekini | | (substituted on) 65' |
| DF | 13 | Tijani Babangida | | (substituted on) 73' |
Manager:
(Serbia and Montenegro) Bora Milutinović

| GK | 1 | Peter Schmeichel |
| RB | 12 | Søren Colding |
| CB | 3 | Marc Rieper | (yellow card) 24' |
| CB | 4 | Jes Høgh |
| LB | 5 | Jan Heintze |
| CM | 6 | Thomas Helveg |
| CM | 7 | Allan Nielsen |
| RW | 21 | Martin Jørgensen |
| LW | 10 | Michael Laudrup (c) | | (substituted off) 84' |
| SS | 11 | Brian Laudrup | | (substituted off) 78' |
| CF | 18 | Peter Møller | | (substituted off) 59' |
Substitutes:
| FW | 19 | Ebbe Sand | | (substituted on) 59' |
| MF | 14 | Morten Wieghorst | | (substituted on) 78' |
| MF | 8 | Per Frandsen | | (substituted on) 84' |
Manager:
(Sweden) Bo Johansson

Assistant referees:
Hussain Ghadanfari (Kuwait)
Fernando Tresaco Gracia (Spain)
Fourth official:
Rahman Al Zaid (Saudi Arabia)

3 July 1998 (quarter-finals)
21:00

| Brazil | 3–2 | Denmark |
|---|---|---|
| Bebeto 10'; Rivaldo 25', 59' | Report | Jørgensen 2'; B. Laudrup 50' |

Stade de la Beaujoire, Nantes
Attendance: 35,500
Referee: Gamal Al-Ghandour (Egypt)

Brazil

Denmark

| GK | 1 | Cláudio Taffarel |
| RB | 2 | Cafu | (yellow card) 81' |
| CB | 3 | Aldair | (yellow card) 37' |
| CB | 4 | Junior Baiano |
| LB | 6 | Roberto Carlos | (yellow card) 11' |
| CM | 5 | César Sampaio |
| CM | 8 | Dunga (c) |
| AM | 10 | Rivaldo | | (substituted off) 87' |
| AM | 18 | Leonardo | | (substituted off) 71' |
| CF | 20 | Bebeto | | (substituted off) 64' |
| CF | 9 | Ronaldo |
Substitutes:
| FW | 19 | Denílson | | (substituted on) 64' |
| MF | 11 | Emerson | | (substituted on) 71' |
| MF | 16 | Zé Roberto | | (substituted on) 87' |
Manager:
Mário Zagallo

| GK | 1 | Peter Schmeichel |
| RB | 12 | Søren Colding | (yellow card) 39' |
| CB | 3 | Marc Rieper |
| CB | 4 | Jes Høgh |
| LB | 5 | Jan Heintze |
| CM | 6 | Thomas Helveg | (yellow card) 19' | (substituted off) 87' |
| CM | 7 | Allan Nielsen | | (substituted off) 46' |
| RW | 21 | Martin Jørgensen |
| LW | 10 | Michael Laudrup (c) |
| SS | 11 | Brian Laudrup |
| CF | 18 | Peter Møller | | (substituted off) 66' |
Substitutes:
| MF | 15 | Stig Tøfting | (yellow card) 72' | (substituted on) 46' |
| FW | 19 | Ebbe Sand | | (substituted on) 66' |
| DF | 2 | Michael Schjønberg | | (substituted on) 87' |
Manager:
(Sweden) Bo Johansson

Assistant referees:
Mohamed Mansri (Tunisia)
Dramane Danté (Mali)
Fourth official:
Ali Bujsaim (United Arab Emirates)

=== 2002 FIFA World Cup ===
Denmark qualified for the 2002 FIFA World Cup, but despite impressive results in the group stage, especially the 2–0 win against reigning World Cup winners France, Denmark didn't manage to advance any further as they were defeated with a 0–3 score in the round of 16 against England.

| Pos | Team | Pld | W | D | L | GF | GA | GD | Pts | Qualification |
|---|---|---|---|---|---|---|---|---|---|---|
| 1 | Denmark | 3 | 2 | 1 | 0 | 5 | 2 | +3 | 7 | Advance to knockout stage |
| 2 | Senegal | 3 | 1 | 2 | 0 | 5 | 4 | +1 | 5 | Advance to knockout stage |
| 3 | Uruguay | 3 | 0 | 2 | 1 | 4 | 5 | −1 | 2 | |
| 4 | France | 3 | 0 | 1 | 2 | 0 | 3 | −3 | 1 | |

Source: FIFA
Rules for classification: Tie-breaking criteria

All times local (UTC+9)

1 June 2002 (first round)
18:00

| Uruguay | 1–2 | Denmark |
|---|---|---|
| Rodríguez 47' | Report | Tomasson 45', 83' |

Munsu Cup Stadium, Ulsan
Attendance: 30,157
Referee: Saad Mane (Kuwait)

| Uruguay | Denmark |

| GK | 1 | Fabián Carini |
| RB | 2 | Gustavo Méndez | (yellow card) 25' |
| CB | 14 | Gonzalo Sorondo |
| CB | 4 | Paolo Montero (c) |
| LB | 6 | Darío Rodríguez | | (substituted off) 87' |
| RM | 8 | Gustavo Varela |
| CM | 5 | Pablo García |
| LM | 7 | Gianni Guigou |
| AM | 20 | Álvaro Recoba | | (substituted off) 80' |
| CF | 9 | Darío Silva |
| CF | 13 | Sebastián Abreu | | (substituted off) 88' |
Substitutions:
| FW | 17 | Mario Regueiro | | (substituted on) 80' |
| FW | 11 | Federico Magallanes | | (substituted on) 87' |
| FW | 18 | Richard Morales | | (substituted on) 88' |
Manager:
Víctor Púa

| GK | 1 | Thomas Sørensen |
| RB | 6 | Thomas Helveg |
| CB | 4 | Martin Laursen | (yellow card) 51' |
| CB | 3 | René Henriksen |
| LB | 5 | Jan Heintze (c) | (yellow card) 34' | (substituted off) 58' |
| CM | 2 | Stig Tøfting |
| CM | 7 | Thomas Gravesen |
| RW | 19 | Dennis Rommedahl |
| AM | 9 | Jon Dahl Tomasson |
| LW | 8 | Jesper Grønkjær | | (substituted off) 70' |
| CF | 11 | Ebbe Sand | | (substituted off) 89' |
Substitutions:
| DF | 12 | Niclas Jensen | | (substituted on) 58' |
| FW | 10 | Martin Jørgensen | | (substituted on) 70' |
| MF | 17 | Christian Poulsen | | (substituted on) 89' |
Manager:
Morten Olsen

Man of the Match:
Jon Dahl Tomasson (Denmark)

Assistant referees:
Awni Hassouneh (Jordan)
Dramane Dante (Mali)
Fourth official:
Byron Moreno (Ecuador)

6 June 2002 (first round)
15:30

| Denmark | 1–1 | Senegal |
|---|---|---|
| Tomasson 16' (pen.) | Report | Diao 52' |

Daegu World Cup Stadium, Daegu
Attendance: 43,500
Referee: Carlos Batres (Guatemala)

| Denmark | Senegal |

| GK | 1 | Thomas Sørensen |
| RB | 6 | Thomas Helveg | (yellow card) 82' |
| CB | 4 | Martin Laursen |
| CB | 3 | Rene Henriksen |
| LB | 5 | Jan Heintze (c) |
| CM | 2 | Stig Tøfting |
| CM | 7 | Thomas Gravesen | | (substituted off) 62' |
| RW | 19 | Dennis Rommedahl | | (substituted off) 89' |
| AM | 9 | Jon Dahl Tomasson | (yellow card) 20' |
| LW | 8 | Jesper Grønkjær | | (substituted off) 50' |
| CF | 11 | Ebbe Sand | (yellow card) 7' |
Substitutions:
| FW | 10 | Martin Jørgensen | | (substituted on) 50' |
| MF | 17 | Christian Poulsen | (yellow card) 84' | (substituted on) 62' |
| FW | 18 | Peter Løvenkrands | | (substituted on) 89' |
Manager:
Morten Olsen

| GK | 1 | Tony Sylva |
| RB | 17 | Ferdinand Coly |
| CB | 13 | Lamine Diatta |
| CB | 4 | Papa Malick Diop (c) |
| LB | 2 | Omar Daf |
| RM | 14 | Moussa N'Diaye | | (substituted off) 46' |
| CM | 3 | Papa Sarr | | (substituted off) 46' |
| CM | 15 | Salif Diao | (yellow card) 62' (red card) 80' |
| CM | 19 | Papa Bouba Diop |
| LM | 10 | Khalilou Fadiga | (yellow card) 10' |
| CF | 11 | El Hadji Diouf |
Substitutions:
| FW | 7 | Henri Camara | | (substituted on) 46' |
| FW | 9 | Souleymane Camara | | (substituted on) 46' | (substituted off) 83' |
| DF | 21 | Habib Beye | | | (substituted on) 83' |
Manager:
(France) Bruno Metsu

Man of the Match:
Khalilou Fadiga (Senegal)

Assistant referees:
Ferenc Szekely (Hungary)
Visva Krishnan (Singapore)
Fourth official:
Kim Young-Soo (South Korea)

11 June 2002 (first round)
15:30

| Denmark | 2–0 | France |
|---|---|---|
| Rommedahl 22'; Tomasson 67' | Report |

Incheon Munhak Stadium, Incheon
Attendance: 48,100
Referee: Vítor Melo Pereira (Portugal)

| Denmark | France |

| GK | 1 | Thomas Sørensen |
| RB | 6 | Thomas Helveg |
| CB | 4 | Martin Laursen |
| CB | 3 | Rene Henriksen (c) |
| LB | 12 | Niclas Jensen | (yellow card) 71' |
| CM | 2 | Stig Tøfting | | (substituted off) 79' |
| CM | 17 | Christian Poulsen | (yellow card) 27' | (substituted off) 76' |
| CM | 7 | Thomas Gravesen |
| RW | 19 | Dennis Rommedahl |
| LW | 10 | Martin Jørgensen | | (substituted off) 46' |
| CF | 9 | Jon Dahl Tomasson |
Substitutions:
| FW | 8 | Jesper Grønkjær | | (substituted on) 46' |
| DF | 20 | Kasper Bøgelund | | (substituted on) 76' |
| MF | 23 | Brian Steen Nielsen | | (substituted on) 79' |
Manager:
Morten Olsen

| GK | 16 | Fabien Barthez |
| RB | 2 | Vincent Candela |
| CB | 15 | Lilian Thuram |
| CB | 8 | Marcel Desailly (c) |
| LB | 3 | Bixente Lizarazu |
| CM | 4 | Patrick Vieira | | (substituted off) 71' |
| CM | 7 | Claude Makélélé |
| RW | 11 | Sylvain Wiltord | | (substituted off) 83' |
| AM | 10 | Zinedine Zidane |
| LW | 21 | Christophe Dugarry | (yellow card) 8' | (substituted off) 54' |
| CF | 20 | David Trezeguet |
Substitutions:
| FW | 9 | Djibril Cissé | | (substituted on) 54' |
| MF | 22 | Johan Micoud | | (substituted on) 71' |
| MF | 6 | Youri Djorkaeff | | (substituted on) 83' |
Manager:
Roger Lemerre

Man of the Match:
Zinedine Zidane (France)

Assistant referees:
Carlos Matos (Portugal)
Elise Doriri (Vanuatu)
Fourth official:
Ľuboš Micheľ (Slovakia)

15 June 2002 (round of 16)
20:30

| Denmark | 0–3 | England |
|---|---|---|
| | Report | Ferdinand 5'; Owen 22'; Heskey 44' |

Big Swan Stadium, Niigata
Attendance: 40,582
Referee: Markus Merk (Germany)

| Denmark | England |

| GK | 1 | Thomas Sørensen |
| RB | 6 | Thomas Helveg | | (substituted off) 7' |
| CB | 4 | Martin Laursen |
| CB | 3 | René Henriksen (c) |
| LB | 12 | Niclas Jensen |
| CM | 2 | Stig Tøfting | (yellow card) 24' | (substituted off) 58' |
| CM | 7 | Thomas Gravesen |
| RW | 19 | Dennis Rommedahl |
| AM | 9 | Jon Dahl Tomasson |
| LW | 8 | Jesper Grønkjær |
| CF | 11 | Ebbe Sand |
Substitutions:
| DF | 20 | Kasper Bøgelund | | (substituted on) 7' |
| MF | 14 | Claus Jensen | | (substituted on) 58' |
Manager:
Morten Olsen

| GK | 1 | David Seaman |
| RB | 2 | Danny Mills | (yellow card) 50' |
| CB | 5 | Rio Ferdinand |
| CB | 6 | Sol Campbell |
| LB | 3 | Ashley Cole |
| RM | 7 | David Beckham (c) |
| CM | 8 | Paul Scholes | | (substituted off) 49' |
| CM | 21 | Nicky Butt |
| LM | 4 | Trevor Sinclair |
| CF | 11 | Emile Heskey | | (substituted off) 69' |
| CF | 10 | Michael Owen | | (substituted off) 46' |
Substitutions:
| FW | 9 | Robbie Fowler | | (substituted on) 46' |
| MF | 23 | Kieron Dyer | | (substituted on) 49' |
| FW | 17 | Teddy Sheringham | | (substituted on) 69' |
Manager:
(Sweden) Sven-Göran Eriksson

Man of the Match:
Rio Ferdinand (England)

Assistant referees:
Heiner Müller (Germany)
Evzen Amler (Czech Republic)
Fourth official:
Mourad Daami (Tunisia)

=== 2010 FIFA World Cup ===
At the 2010 World Cup, Denmark was grouped with Japan, Cameroon and the Netherlands. Denmark lost the first match 2–0 to Netherlands, but then had a vital 2–1 victory against Cameroon, which enabled further advancement in case of victory over Japan, the final match of the group stage. Denmark, however, lost 3–1, thereby failing to reach their goal of advancing to the round of 16 for the first time.

| Pos | Team | Pld | W | D | L | GF | GA | GD | Pts | Qualification |
|---|---|---|---|---|---|---|---|---|---|---|
| 1 | Netherlands | 3 | 3 | 0 | 0 | 5 | 1 | +4 | 9 | Advance to knockout stage |
| 2 | Japan | 3 | 2 | 0 | 1 | 4 | 2 | +2 | 6 | Advance to knockout stage |
| 3 | Denmark | 3 | 1 | 0 | 2 | 3 | 6 | −3 | 3 | |
| 4 | Cameroon | 3 | 0 | 0 | 3 | 2 | 5 | −3 | 0 | |

Source: FIFA
Rules for classification: Tie-breaking criteria

All times local (UTC+02)

14 June 2010 (first round)
13:30

| Netherlands | 2–0 | Denmark |
|---|---|---|
| Agger 46' (o.g.); Kuyt 85' | Report |

Soccer City, Johannesburg
Attendance: 83,465
Referee: Stéphane Lannoy (France)

| Netherlands | Denmark |

| GK | 1 | Maarten Stekelenburg |
| RB | 2 | Gregory van der Wiel |
| CB | 3 | John Heitinga |
| CB | 4 | Joris Mathijsen |
| LB | 5 | Giovanni van Bronckhorst (c) |
| CM | 6 | Mark van Bommel |
| CM | 8 | Nigel de Jong | (yellow card) 44' | (substituted off) 88' |
| RW | 7 | Dirk Kuyt |
| AM | 10 | Wesley Sneijder |
| LW | 23 | Rafael van der Vaart | | (substituted off) 67' |
| CF | 9 | Robin van Persie | (yellow card) 49' | (substituted off) 77' |
Substitutions:
| FW | 17 | Eljero Elia | | (substituted on) 67' |
| MF | 20 | Ibrahim Afellay | | (substituted on) 77' |
| MF | 14 | Demy de Zeeuw | | (substituted on) 88' |
Manager:
Bert van Marwijk

| GK | 1 | Thomas Sørensen |
| RB | 6 | Lars Jacobsen |
| CB | 4 | Daniel Agger |
| CB | 3 | Simon Kjær | (yellow card) 63' |
| LB | 15 | Simon Poulsen |
| RM | 20 | Thomas Enevoldsen | | (substituted off) 56' |
| CM | 2 | Christian Poulsen |
| CM | 12 | Thomas Kahlenberg | | (substituted off) 73' |
| LM | 10 | Martin Jørgensen (c) |
| SS | 19 | Dennis Rommedahl |
| CF | 11 | Nicklas Bendtner | | (substituted off) 62' |
Substitutions:
| MF | 8 | Jesper Grønkjær | | (substituted on) 56' |
| FW | 17 | Mikkel Beckmann | | (substituted on) 62' |
| MF | 21 | Christian Eriksen | | (substituted on) 73' |
Manager:
Morten Olsen

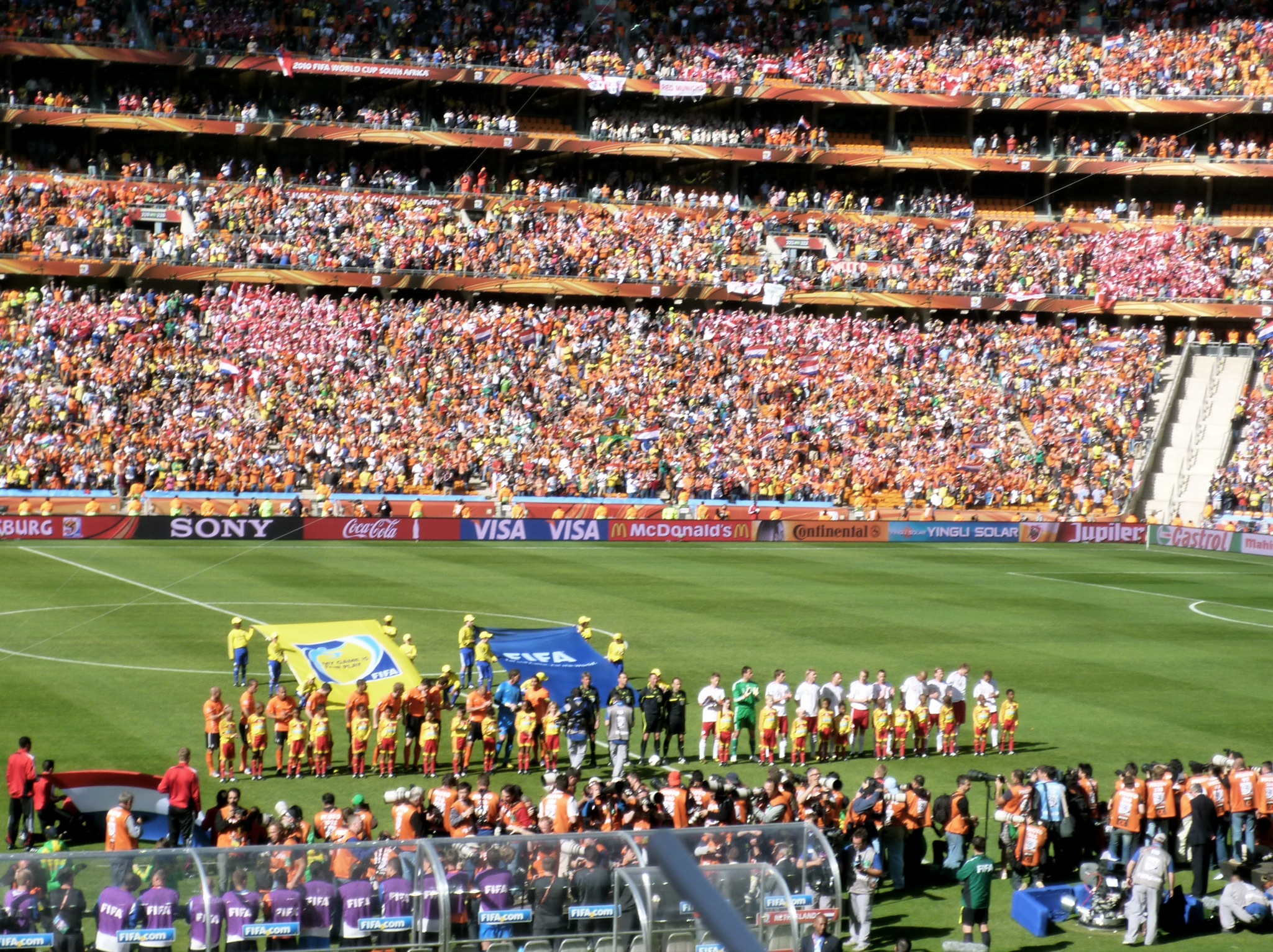
Netherlands vs Denmark

Man of the Match:
Wesley Sneijder (Netherlands)

Assistant referees:
Eric Dansault (France)
Laurent Ugo (France)
Fourth official:
Roberto Rosetti (Italy)
Fifth official:
Paolo Calcagno (Italy)

19 June 2010 (first round)
20:30

| Cameroon | 1–2 | Denmark |
|---|---|---|
| Eto'o 10' | Report | Bendtner 33'; Rommedahl 61' |

Loftus Versfeld Stadium, Pretoria
Attendance: 38,074
Referee: Jorge Larrionda (Uruguay)

| Cameroon | Denmark |

| GK | 16 | Souleymanou Hamidou |
| RB | 19 | Stéphane Mbia | (yellow card) 75' |
| CB | 3 | Nicolas N'Koulou |
| CB | 5 | Sébastien Bassong | (yellow card) 49' | (substituted off) 72' |
| LB | 2 | Benoît Assou-Ekotto |
| RM | 6 | Alex Song |
| CM | 8 | Geremi |
| CM | 18 | Eyong Enoh | | (substituted off) 46' |
| LM | 10 | Achille Emana |
| SS | 15 | Pierre Webó | | (substituted off) 78' |
| CF | 9 | Samuel Eto'o (c) |
Substitutions:
| MF | 11 | Jean Makoun | | (substituted on) 46' |
| FW | 17 | Mohammadou Idrissou | | (substituted on) 72' |
| FW | 23 | Vincent Aboubakar | | (substituted on) 78' |
Manager:
(France) Paul Le Guen

| GK | 1 | Thomas Sørensen | (yellow card) 86' |
| RB | 6 | Lars Jacobsen |
| CB | 3 | Simon Kjær | (yellow card) 87' |
| CB | 4 | Daniel Agger |
| LB | 15 | Simon Poulsen |
| CM | 2 | Christian Poulsen |
| CM | 10 | Martin Jørgensen | | (substituted off) 46' |
| RW | 19 | Dennis Rommedahl |
| AM | 9 | Jon Dahl Tomasson (c) | | (substituted off) 86' |
| LW | 8 | Jesper Grønkjær | | (substituted off) 67' |
| CF | 11 | Nicklas Bendtner |
Substitutions:
| MF | 7 | Daniel Jensen | | (substituted on) 46' |
| MF | 12 | Thomas Kahlenberg | | (substituted on) 67' |
| MF | 14 | Jakob Poulsen | | (substituted on) 86' |
Manager:
Morten Olsen

Man of the Match:
Daniel Agger (Denmark)

Assistant referees:
Pablo Fandino (Uruguay)
Mauricio Espinosa (Uruguay)
Fourth official:
Peter O'Leary (New Zealand)
Fifth official:
Brent Best (New Zealand)

Japan opened the scoring in the 17th minute from a direct free kick taken by Keisuke Honda – only the second goal scored from a free kick in the tournament. Honda, standing to Danish goalkeeper Thomas Sørensen's left, kicked the ball with great force; Sørensen initially moved to his left, and as the ball sailed past the wall, he shifted direction, but could not recover in time to make the save. Japan's second goal came thirteen minutes later, also from a direct free kick, this time by Yasuhito Endō. Standing outside the penalty area directly in front of the Danish goal, he curled the ball around the wall. Sørensen had been standing on the right side of his goal and could not move to his left fast enough. Endō almost scored from yet another free kick early in the second half. This time, Sørensen appeared to have difficulty judging the path of the ball, and was only able to palm it away at the last second, where it caromed off the goalpost.

Denmark needed to win this game in order to advance and increased their attacks accordingly. Late in the second half, Christian Eriksen put his shot over the goal and Søren Larsen hit the goalpost. They were finally able to score in the 82nd minute. When Makoto Hasebe was adjudged to have fouled Daniel Agger inside the penalty area, Denmark were awarded a penalty kick. Jon Dahl Tomasson took the shot, which was saved by Eiji Kawashima; the goalkeeper, however, was unable to control the rebound, which fell to Tomasson, and he was able to put it in the goal. Japan scored their final goal in the 87th minute. Honda dribbled into the penalty area, forcing Sørensen to attempt to block a potential shot, but Honda passed it to substitute Shinji Okazaki, who merely had to put the ball into an empty net.

The victory was Japan's second World Cup tournament victory on foreign soil, and only their second against a European team. Japan finished group play in second place with six points, and advanced to the knockout round for the second time in their history, and the first time on foreign soil. Denmark ended in third with three points. This was the first time Denmark failed to get past the group stage in the World Cup.

24 June 2010 (first round)
20:30

| Denmark | 1–3 | Japan |
|---|---|---|
| Tomasson 81' | Report | Honda 17'; Endō 30'; Okazaki 87' |

Royal Bafokeng Stadium, Rustenburg
Attendance: 27,967
Referee: Jerome Damon (South Africa)

| Denmark | Japan |

| GK | 1 | Thomas Sørensen |
| RB | 6 | Lars Jacobsen |
| CB | 4 | Daniel Agger |
| CB | 13 | Per Krøldrup | (yellow card) 29' | (substituted off) 56' |
| LB | 15 | Simon Poulsen |
| DM | 2 | Christian Poulsen | (yellow card) 48' |
| CM | 10 | Martin Jørgensen | | (substituted off) 34' |
| CM | 12 | Thomas Kahlenberg | | (substituted off) 63' |
| AM | 9 | Jon Dahl Tomasson (c) |
| AM | 19 | Dennis Rommedahl |
| CF | 11 | Nicklas Bendtner | (yellow card) 66' |
Substitutions:
| MF | 14 | Jakob Poulsen | | (substituted on) 34' |
| FW | 18 | Søren Larsen | | (substituted on) 56' |
| MF | 21 | Christian Eriksen | | (substituted on) 63' |
Manager:
Morten Olsen

| GK | 21 | Eiji Kawashima |
| RB | 3 | Yūichi Komano |
| CB | 22 | Yuji Nakazawa |
| CB | 4 | Marcus Tulio Tanaka |
| LB | 5 | Yuto Nagatomo | (yellow card) 26' |
| DM | 2 | Yuki Abe |
| CM | 8 | Daisuke Matsui | | (substituted off) 74' |
| CM | 7 | Yasuhito Endō | (yellow card) 12' | (substituted off) 90+1' |
| RW | 17 | Makoto Hasebe (c) |
| LW | 16 | Yoshito Ōkubo | | (substituted off) 88' |
| CF | 18 | Keisuke Honda |
Substitutions:
| FW | 9 | Shinji Okazaki | | (substituted on) 74' |
| DF | 15 | Yasuyuki Konno | | (substituted on) 88' |
| MF | 20 | Junichi Inamoto | | (substituted on) 90+1' |
Manager:
Takeshi Okada

Man of the Match:
Keisuke Honda (Japan)

Assistant referees:
Célestin Ntagungira (Rwanda)
Enock Molefe (South Africa)
Fourth official:
Martin Hansson (Sweden)
Fifth official:
Henrik Andrén (Sweden)

=== 2018 FIFA World Cup ===
==== Group Stage ====
| Pos | Team | Pld | W | D | L | GF | GA | GD | Pts | Qualification |
|---|---|---|---|---|---|---|---|---|---|---|
| 1 | France | 3 | 2 | 1 | 0 | 3 | 1 | +2 | 7 | Advance to knockout stage |
| 2 | Denmark | 3 | 1 | 2 | 0 | 2 | 1 | +1 | 5 | Advance to knockout stage |
| 3 | Peru | 3 | 1 | 0 | 2 | 2 | 2 | 0 | 3 | |
| 4 | Australia | 3 | 0 | 1 | 2 | 2 | 5 | −3 | 1 | |

Source: FIFA
16 June 2018
19:00 MSK (UTC+3)

| Peru | 0–1 | Denmark |
|---|---|---|
| | | Poulsen 59' |

Mordovia Arena, Saransk
Attendance: 40,502
Referee: Bakary Gassama (Gambia)

21 June 2018
16:00 SAMT (UTC+4)

| Denmark | 1–1 | Australia |
|---|---|---|
| Eriksen 7' | | Jedinak 38' (pen.) |

Cosmos Arena, Samara
Attendance: 40,727
Referee: Antonio Mateu Lahoz (Spain)

26 June 2018
17:00 MSK (UTC+3)

| Denmark | 0–0 | France |

Luzhniki Stadium, Moscow
Attendance: 78,011
Referee: Sandro Ricci (Brazil)

==== Knockout stage ====
Round of 16

1 July 2018
21:00 MSK (UTC+3)

| Croatia | 1–1 (a.e.t.) | Denmark |
|---|---|---|
| Mandžukić 4' | | M. Jørgensen 1' |
Penalties
| Badelj (penalty missed); Kramarić (penalty scored); Modrić (penalty scored); Pivarić (penalty missed); Rakitić (penalty scored) | 3–2 | (penalty missed) Eriksen; (penalty scored) Kjær; (penalty scored) Krohn-Dehli; (penalty missed) Schöne; (penalty missed) N. Jørgensen |

Nizhny Novgorod Stadium, Nizhny Novgorod
Attendance: 40,851
Referee: Néstor Pitana (Argentina)

=== 2022 FIFA World Cup ===
==== Group Stage ====
| Pos | Team | Pld | W | D | L | GF | GA | GD | Pts | Qualification |
|---|---|---|---|---|---|---|---|---|---|---|
| 1 | France | 3 | 2 | 0 | 1 | 6 | 3 | +3 | 6 | Advance to knockout stage |
| 2 | Australia | 3 | 2 | 0 | 1 | 3 | 4 | −1 | 6 | Advance to knockout stage |
| 3 | Tunisia | 3 | 1 | 1 | 1 | 1 | 1 | 0 | 4 | |
| 4 | Denmark | 3 | 0 | 1 | 2 | 1 | 3 | −2 | 1 | |

Source: FIFA
Rules for classification: Group stage tiebreakers
22 November 2022
16:00

| Denmark | 0–0 | Tunisia |

Education City Stadium, Al Rayyan
Attendance: 42,925
Referee: César Arturo Ramos (Mexico)

26 November 2022
19:00

| France | 2–1 | Denmark |
|---|---|---|
| Mbappé 61', 86' | | A. Christensen 68' |

Stadium 974, Doha
Attendance: 42,860
Referee: Szymon Marciniak (Poland)

30 November 2022
18:00

| Australia | 1–0 | Denmark |
|---|---|---|
| Leckie 60' |

Al Janoub Stadium, Al Wakrah
Attendance: 41,232
Referee: Mustapha Ghorbal (Algeria)

== Player records ==
=== Most appearances ===
| Rank | Player | Matches | World Cups |
|---|---|---|---|
| 1 | Martin Jørgensen | 11 | 1998, 2002 and 2010 |
| 2 | Christian Eriksen | 9 | 2010, 2018 and 2022 |
| 2 | Thomas Helveg | 9 | 1998 and 2002 |
| 2 | Michael Laudrup | 9 | 1986 and 1998 |
| 5 | Ebbe Sand | 8 | 1998 and 2002 |
| 6 | Andreas Christensen | 7 | 2018 and 2022 |
| 6 | Jan Heintze | 7 | 1998 and 2002 |
| 6 | Simon Kjær | 7 | 2010, 2018 and 2022 |
| 6 | Dennis Rommedahl | 7 | 2002 and 2010 |
| 6 | Kasper Schmeichel | 7 | 2018 and 2022 |
| 6 | Thomas Sørensen | 7 | 2002 and 2010 |

=== Goalscorers ===
| Rank | Player | Goals | World Cups |
|---|---|---|---|
| 1 | Jon Dahl Tomasson | 5 | 2002 (4) and 2010 (1) |
| 2 | Preben Elkjær | 4 | 1986 |
| 3 | Jesper Olsen | 3 | 1986 |
| 4 | Michael Laudrup | 2 | 1986 (1) and 1998 (1) |
| 4 | Brian Laudrup | 2 | 1998 |
| 4 | Dennis Rommedahl | 2 | 2002 (1) and 2010 (1) |
| 7 | John Eriksen | 1 | 1986 |
| 7 | Søren Lerby | 1 | 1986 |
| 7 | Thomas Helveg | 1 | 1998 |
| 7 | Martin Jørgensen | 1 | 1998 |
| 7 | Peter Møller | 1 | 1998 |
| 7 | Allan Nielsen | 1 | 1998 |
| 7 | Marc Rieper | 1 | 1998 |
| 7 | Ebbe Sand | 1 | 1998 |
| 7 | Nicklas Bendtner | 1 | 2010 |
| 7 | Yussuf Poulsen | 1 | 2018 |
| 7 | Christian Eriksen | 1 | 2018 |
| 7 | Mathias Jørgensen | 1 | 2018 |
| 7 | Andreas Christensen | 1 | 2022 |

== Awards and records ==
Awards

- Bronze Ball 1986: Preben Elkjær

Records

- Longest gap between two goals by a player: Michael Laudrup (12 years and 16 days, 1986–1998)
- Fastest goal by a substitute: Ebbe Sand 1998 against Nigeria

== See also ==
- Denmark at the UEFA European Championship
