= 1998 FIFA World Cup Group C =

Football tournament group stage

At the 1998 FIFA World Cup, the 32 teams were divided into eight groups of four, labelled A–H. Group C was composed of Saudi Arabia, South Africa, Denmark and host nation and eventual world champion France.

Denmark and France started well, defeating Saudi Arabia and South Africa respectively. Next, France scored four to eliminate Saudi Arabia and qualify with a match to spare, while Denmark and South Africa drew. Needing a big win in their final game, against Saudi Arabia, South Africa conceded two penalties and could only draw, so Denmark still qualified despite losing their final game to France.

== Standings ==
Pos	Team	Pld	W	D	L	GF	GA	GD	Pts	Qualification
1	France (H)	3	3	0	0	9	1	+8	9	Advance to knockout stage
2	Denmark	3	1	1	1	3	3	0	4	Advance to knockout stage
3	South Africa	3	0	2	1	3	6	−3	2	
4	Saudi Arabia	3	0	1	2	2	7	−5	1	

Source: FIFA
(H) Hosts
- France advanced to play Paraguay (runner-up of Group D) in the round of 16.
- Denmark advanced to play Nigeria (winner of Group D) in the round of 16.

== Matches ==
=== Saudi Arabia vs Denmark ===
12 June 1998
17:30 CEST (UTC+2)

Saudi Arabia	0–1	Denmark
		Rieper 69'

Stade Félix-Bollaert, Lens
Attendance: 38,100
Referee: Javier Castrilli (Argentina)

Saudi Arabia	Denmark

GK	1	Mohamed Al-Deayea
DF	2	Mohammed Sheliah
DF	3	Mohammed Al-Khilaiwi
DF	4	Abdullah Sulaiman Zubromawi
DF	13	Hussein Abdulghani
MF	6	Fuad Anwar (c)		(substituted off) 78'
MF	7	Ibrahim Suwayed
MF	14	Khaled Massad	(yellow card) 11'
MF	16	Khamis Al-Owairan
FW	9	Sami Al-Jaber		(substituted off) 84'
FW	10	Saeed Al-Owairan		(substituted off) 79'
Substitutions:
MF	20	Hamzah Saleh		(substituted on) 78'
FW	8	Obeid Al-Dosari		(substituted on) 79'
FW	15	Yousuf Al-Thunayan		(substituted on) 84'
Manager:
(Brazil) Carlos Alberto Parreira

GK	1	Peter Schmeichel
DF	2	Michael Schjønberg
DF	3	Marc Rieper	(yellow card) 60'
DF	4	Jes Høgh
DF	6	Thomas Helveg
DF	12	Søren Colding
MF	10	Michael Laudrup (c)
MF	14	Morten Wieghorst	(yellow card) 12'	(substituted off) 65'
MF	21	Martin Jørgensen		(substituted off) 73'
FW	11	Brian Laudrup		(substituted off) 84'
FW	19	Ebbe Sand
Substitutions:
MF	7	Allan Nielsen	(yellow card) 73'	(substituted on) 65'
MF	8	Per Frandsen		(substituted on) 73'
DF	5	Jan Heintze		(substituted on) 84'
Manager:
(Sweden) Bo Johansson

Assistant referees:
Claudio Rossi (Argentina)
Jorge Diaz Garcia (Chile)
Fourth official:
Hugh Dallas (Scotland)

=== France vs South Africa ===
12 June 1998
21:00 CEST (UTC+2)

France	3–0	South Africa
Dugarry 36'; Issa 77' (o.g.); Henry 90+2'

Stade Vélodrome, Marseille
Attendance: 55,000
Referee: Márcio Rezende de Freitas (Brazil)

France	South Africa

GK	16	Fabien Barthez
RB	15	Lilian Thuram
CB	8	Marcel Desailly
CB	5	Laurent Blanc
LB	3	Bixente Lizarazu
CM	7	Didier Deschamps (c)	(yellow card) 53'
CM	17	Emmanuel Petit	(yellow card) 28'	(substituted off) 73'
RW	6	Youri Djorkaeff		(substituted off) 84'
AM	10	Zinedine Zidane	(yellow card) 75'
LW	12	Thierry Henry
CF	9	Stéphane Guivarc'h		(substituted off) 26'
Substitutions:
FW	21	Christophe Dugarry		(substituted on) 26'
MF	14	Alain Boghossian		(substituted on) 73'
FW	20	David Trezeguet		(substituted on) 84'
Manager:
Aimé Jacquet

GK	1	Hans Vonk
DF	3	David Nyathi
DF	4	Willem Jackson	(yellow card) 39'
DF	5	Mark Fish
DF	19	Lucas Radebe (c)
DF	21	Pierre Issa
MF	7	Quinton Fortune
MF	10	John Moshoeu
FW	6	Phil Masinga
FW	12	Brendan Augustine		(substituted off) 56'
FW	17	Benni McCarthy		(substituted off) 89'
Substitutions:
MF	11	Helman Mkhalele		(substituted on) 56'
FW	9	Shaun Bartlett		(substituted on) 89'
Manager:
(France) Philippe Troussier

Assistant referees:
Arnaldo Pinto (Brazil)
Merere Gonzales (Trinidad and Tobago)
Fourth official:
Mario Sánchez Yanten (Chile)

=== South Africa vs Denmark ===
18 June 1998
17:30 CEST (UTC+2)

South Africa	1–1	Denmark
McCarthy 51'		Nielsen 12'

Stade de Toulouse, Toulouse
Attendance: 33,500
Referee: John Toro Rendón (Colombia)

South Africa	Denmark

GK	1	Hans Vonk
DF	3	David Nyathi	(yellow card) 28'	(substituted off) 88'
DF	5	Mark Fish
DF	19	Lucas Radebe (c)	(yellow card) 73'
DF	21	Pierre Issa	(yellow card) 63'
MF	7	Quinton Fortune
MF	10	John Moshoeu
MF	11	Helman Mkhalele
FW	9	Shaun Bartlett		(substituted off) 77'
FW	12	Brendan Augustine		(substituted off) 46'
FW	17	Benni McCarthy
Substitutions:
MF	8	Alfred Phiri	(yellow card) 65' (red card) 68'	(substituted on) 46'
FW	6	Phil Masinga		(substituted on) 77'
FW	13	Delron Buckley		(substituted on) 88'
Manager:
(France) Philippe Troussier

GK	1	Peter Schmeichel	(yellow card) 57'
DF	2	Michael Schjønberg	(yellow card) 23'	(substituted off) 82'
DF	3	Marc Rieper
DF	4	Jes Høgh	(yellow card) 56'
DF	6	Thomas Helveg
DF	12	Søren Colding
MF	7	Allan Nielsen
MF	10	Michael Laudrup (c)		(substituted off) 58'
MF	21	Martin Jørgensen
FW	11	Brian Laudrup
FW	19	Ebbe Sand		(substituted off) 58'
Substitutions:
DF	5	Jan Heintze		(substituted on) 58'
FW	9	Miklos Molnar	(red card) 66'	(substituted on) 58'
MF	14	Morten Wieghorst	(red card) 85'	(substituted on) 82'
Manager:
(Sweden) Bo Johansson

Assistant referees:
Jorge Luis Arango (Colombia)
Celestino Galván (Paraguay)
Fourth official:
Epifanio González (Paraguay)

=== France vs Saudi Arabia ===
Mohammed Al-Khilaiwi was sent off in the 19th minute after tripping Bixente Lizarazu from behind. Zinedine Zidane was ejected at the 71st minute when he appeared to plant his studs into the side of Saudi captain Fuad Anwar after they collided going for a ball.

18 June 1998
21:00 CEST (UTC+2)

France	4–0	Saudi Arabia
Henry 37', 78'; Trezeguet 68'; Lizarazu 85'

Stade de France, Saint-Denis
Attendance: 80,000
Referee: Arturo Brizio Carter (Mexico)

France	Saudi Arabia

GK	16	Fabien Barthez
RB	15	Lilian Thuram
CB	5	Laurent Blanc	(yellow card) 36'
CB	8	Marcel Desailly
LB	3	Bixente Lizarazu	(yellow card) 50'
CM	7	Didier Deschamps (c)
CM	14	Alain Boghossian
RW	12	Thierry Henry		(substituted off) 79'
AM	10	Zinedine Zidane	(red card) 71'
LW	13	Bernard Diomède		(substituted off) 58'
CF	21	Christophe Dugarry		(substituted off) 30'
Substitutions:
FW	20	David Trezeguet		(substituted on) 30'
MF	6	Youri Djorkaeff		(substituted on) 58'
MF	11	Robert Pires		(substituted on) 79'
Manager:
Aimé Jacquet

GK	1	Mohamed Al-Deayea
DF	2	Mohammed Al-Jahani	(yellow card) 7'	(substituted off) 76'
DF	3	Mohammed Al-Khilaiwi	(red card) 19'
DF	4	Abdullah Zubromawi
DF	13	Hussein Abdulghani
MF	6	Fuad Anwar (c)
MF	7	Ibrahim Suwayed
MF	16	Khamis Al-Owairan
MF	20	Hamzah Saleh
FW	9	Sami Al-Jaber	(yellow card) 82'
FW	10	Saeed Al-Owairan		(substituted off) 33'
Substitutions:
MF	12	Ibrahim Mater		(substituted on) 33'	(substituted off) 65'
MF	14	Khaled Massad			(substituted on) 65'
DF	17	Ahmed Al-Dokhi		(substituted on) 76'
Manager:
(Brazil) Carlos Alberto Parreira

Assistant referees:
Reynaldo Salinas (Honduras)
Luis Torres Zuniga (Costa Rica)
Fourth official:
Alberto Tejada Noriega (Peru)

=== France vs Denmark ===
24 June 1998
16:00 CEST (UTC+2)

France	2–1	Denmark
Djorkaeff 12' (pen.); Petit 56'		M. Laudrup 42' (pen.)

Stade de Gerland, Lyon
Attendance: 39,100
Referee: Pierluigi Collina (Italy)

France	Denmark

GK	16	Fabien Barthez
DF	2	Vincent Candela
DF	8	Marcel Desailly (c)
DF	18	Frank Leboeuf
MF	4	Patrick Vieira	(yellow card) 62'
MF	6	Youri Djorkaeff
MF	11	Robert Pires		(substituted off) 71'
MF	13	Bernard Diomède	(yellow card) 53'
MF	17	Emmanuel Petit		(substituted off) 64'
MF	19	Christian Karembeu
FW	20	David Trezeguet		(substituted off) 85'
Substitutions:
MF	14	Alain Boghossian		(substituted on) 64'
FW	12	Thierry Henry		(substituted on) 71'
FW	9	Stéphane Guivarc'h		(substituted on) 85'
Manager:
Aimé Jacquet

GK	1	Peter Schmeichel
DF	2	Michael Schjønberg
DF	3	Marc Rieper
DF	4	Jes Høgh
DF	5	Jan Heintze
DF	6	Thomas Helveg
DF	13	Jacob Laursen		(substituted off) 46'
MF	7	Allan Nielsen
MF	10	Michael Laudrup (c)
MF	21	Martin Jørgensen		(substituted off) 54'
FW	11	Brian Laudrup		(substituted off) 75'
Substitutions:
DF	12	Søren Colding	(yellow card) 65'	(substituted on) 46'
FW	19	Ebbe Sand		(substituted on) 54'
MF	15	Stig Tøfting	(yellow card) 78'	(substituted on) 75'
Manager:
(Sweden) Bo Johansson

Assistant referees:
Marc Van den Broeck (Belgium)
Emanuel Zammit (Malta)
Fourth official:
Vítor Melo Pereira (Portugal)

=== South Africa vs Saudi Arabia ===
24 June 1998
16:00 CEST (UTC+2)

South Africa	2–2	Saudi Arabia
Bartlett 18', 90+3' (pen.)		Al-Jaber 45+2' (pen.); Al-Thunayan 74' (pen.)

Parc Lescure, Bordeaux
Attendance: 31,800
Referee: Mario Sánchez (Chile)

South Africa	Saudi Arabia

GK	1	Hans Vonk
DF	3	David Nyathi
DF	4	Willem Jackson		(substituted off) 46'
DF	5	Mark Fish
DF	19	Lucas Radebe (c)	(yellow card) 65'
DF	21	Pierre Issa
MF	7	Quinton Fortune	(yellow card) 38'	(substituted off) 67'
MF	10	John Moshoeu
MF	11	Helman Mkhalele
FW	9	Shaun Bartlett
FW	17	Benni McCarthy		(substituted off) 46'
Substitutions:
FW	13	Delron Buckley		(substituted on) 46'
FW	14	Jerry Sikhosana		(substituted on) 46'
MF	15	Doctor Khumalo		(substituted on) 67'
Manager:
(France) Philippe Troussier

GK	1	Mohamed Al-Deayea
DF	2	Mohammed Al-Jahani
DF	4	Abdullah Zubromawi
DF	13	Hussein Abdulghani
MF	6	Fuad Anwar
MF	16	Khamis Al-Owairan	(yellow card) 30'
MF	18	Nawaf Al-Temyat
MF	20	Hamzah Saleh
FW	9	Sami Al-Jaber
FW	11	Fahad Al-Mehallel		(substituted off) 64'
FW	15	Yousuf Al-Thunayan (c)		(substituted off) 81'
Substitutions:
MF	7	Ibrahim Suwayed		(substituted on) 64'
MF	12	Ibrahim Mater		(substituted on) 81'
Manager:
Mohammed Al-Kharashy

Assistant referees:
Owen Powell (Jamaica)
Eddie Foley (Republic of Ireland)
Fourth official:
Alberto Tejada Noriega (Peru)

== See also ==
- Denmark at the FIFA World Cup
- France at the FIFA World Cup
- Saudi Arabia at the FIFA World Cup
- South Africa at the FIFA World Cup
