= List of FIFA World Cup red cards =

Football tournament statistics

This is a list of all occasions where a football player was sent off from a FIFA World Cup match due to a foul or misconduct, either as a direct expulsion (red card) or as a second caution (yellow card) within the match.

This article includes all dismissals of players, substitutes, and substituted players since the first World Cup in 1930 and all dismissals of team officials since the 2022 World Cup. The use of physical red and yellow cards to respectively indicate dismissals and cautions was first introduced at the 1970 tournament for players, substitutes, and substituted players; this practice has been extended to team officials since the 2022 tournament.

== Statistics ==
- Plácido Galindo was the first player to be sent off in a World Cup match, playing for Peru against Romania in a 1930 match officiated by Alberto Warnken. Although physical red cards were introduced from 1970, they were not put in practice until the 1974 World Cup, when referee Doğan Babacan sent off Chile's Carlos Caszely during a match against West Germany.
- Two players have received red cards twice: Cameroon's Rigobert Song (1994 and 1998) and France's Zinedine Zidane (1998 and 2006).
- Six dismissals have taken place during final matches: Argentina's Pedro Monzón, Gustavo Dezotti (both 1990), and Enzo Fernández (2026), France's Marcel Desailly (1998) and Zinedine Zidane (2006), and John Heitinga of the Netherlands (2010).
- Only six dismissals have been shown in a FIFA World Cup opening match: Cameroon's André Kana-Biyik and Benjamin Massing against Argentina in 1990, Bolivia's Marco Etcheverry against Germany in 1994, and South Africa's Sphephelo Sithole and Themba Zwane alongside Mexico's César Montes in 2026.
- Uruguay's José Batista received the quickest red card, in the first minute in a game against Scotland in 1986.
- A few expulsions either took place after the final whistle of the match or were awarded to players at the substitutes' bench (or both), and thus did not reduce the number of players on the pitch during the game. Two of them, that of Leandro Cufré of Argentina (vs Germany, 2006) and that of Denzel Dumfries of the Netherlands (vs Argentina, 2022), took place after the penalty shoot-outs of knockout matches, making them the latest red cards.
- Three goalkeepers have been sent off in the tournament: Italy's Gianluca Pagliuca (1994), South Africa's Itumeleng Khune (2010), and Wales's Wayne Hennessey (2022).
- There have been 10 dismissals for the hosts: Chile's Honorino Landa (1962) Mexico's Javier Aguirre (1986) USA's Fernando Clavijo (1994) France's Zinedine Zidane, Laurent Blanc and Marcel Desailly (1998) South Africa's Itumeleng Khune (2010) Russia's Igor Smolnikov (2018) Mexico's César Montes and USA's Folarin Balogun (2026)
- The match with the most dismissals was Portugal vs Netherlands of 2006, when referee Valentin Ivanov dished out 4 red cards, 2 for each team.
- The referee who has sent off the most players is Arturo Brizio Carter, 7 red cards, in 5 different matches (also a record).
- Teams that have the greatest number of expulsed players are Argentina and Brazil, with 11 both. Argentina's players were sent off in 10 matches – also a record. The team whose opponents have received the most red cards is Germany (incl. West Germany), with 20 – in 18 different matches, also a record.
- The 2006 World Cup had the largest number of red cards: a total of 28 players were sent off (in 20 matches, also a record).
- There has been a total of 192 dismissals given to 65 teams/countries.

=== Notable incidents ===
- Of more than two dozen matches that had multiple player expulsions, a few are remembered for their exceptional violence and brutality: the "Battle of Bordeaux" (Brazil vs Czechoslovakia, 1938), the "Battle of Berne" (Hungary vs Brazil, 1954), the "Battle of Santiago" (Chile vs Italy, 1962), the "Battle of Nuremberg" (Portugal vs Netherlands, 2006), and the "Battle of Lusail" (Netherlands vs Argentina, 2022).
- During the 2006 final, French captain Zinedine Zidane was sent off after he famously headbutted Italy's Marco Materazzi in the chest, after a verbal provocation by Materazzi. This was the final act of Zidane's professional career, as he remained committed to his pre-tournament decision to retire after the tournament. France lost the final on penalties.
- During a 2006 match between Croatia and Australia, referee Graham Poll failed to send off Croatian player Josip Šimunić after the second yellow card, and only did so when he issued a third one, right after the final whistle minutes later. FIFA's report on the match initially listed all three bookings, but later the second one was removed; it is not known if the booking was retroactively overturned, if it was removed because it was erroneously given to Australia #3 (Craig Moore) or if this was done for report consistency purposes only.
- During a 2010 quarter-final against Ghana, with the score tied at 1–1 going into stoppage time of the second period of extra time, Uruguayan striker Luis Suárez was red carded after famously denying a goal-bound header with his hand. Ghana missed the resulting penalty and went on to lose the subsequent penalty shoot-out; with a victory they would have become the first ever African team to reach the final four of the competition.
- Only two World Cup dismissals have not been followed by the imposition of a suspension: at the 1962 tournament, the Chilean president Jorge Alessandri appealed to the FIFA disciplinary committee to not have Brazil's Garrincha suspended for the final, after the striker was sent off for violent conduct in the semi-final against hosts Chile; and at the 2026 World Cup, FIFA rescinded the automatic one-game suspension that United States striker Folarin Balogun incurred after being dismissed for during the round of 32 game against Bosnia and Herzegovina.
- A new rule was added for the 2026 World Cup, due to an incident in the UEFA Champions League: a player who covers his mouth during a verbal confrontation with an opponent receives a straight red card. The first player to be sent off was Paraguayan winger Miguel Almirón and the second sending off was Ecuadorian defender Piero Hincapié.

== List of red cards ==
=== Players ===
Key
Match had two red cards
Match had three red cards
Match had four red cards

Tournament	#	M	Player	T	Time	Representing	At score	Final score	Opponent	Referee	Round	Date
1930, Uruguay	1.	1.	Plácido Galindo	Red card	54'	Peru	0–1	1–3	Romania	Alberto Warnken (CHI)	Group stage	14 July 1930
1934, Italy	2.	2.	Imre Markos	Red card	63'	Hungary	1–2	1–2	Austria	Francesco Mattea (ITA)	Quarter-finals	31 May 1934
1938, France	3.	3.	Hans Pesser	Red card	96'	Germany	1–1	1–1^{aet}	Switzerland	John Langenus (BEL)	Group stage	4 June 1938
1938, France	4.	4.	Zezé Procópio	Red card	14'	Brazil	0–0	1–1^{aet}	Czechoslovakia	Pál von Hertzka (HUN)	Quarter-finals	12 June 1938
1938, France	5–6.	4.	Jan Říha	Red card	89'	Czechoslovakia	1–1	1–1^{aet}	Brazil	Pál von Hertzka (HUN)	Quarter-finals	12 June 1938
1938, France	5–6.	4.	Arthur Machado	Red card	89'	Brazil	1–1	1–1^{aet}	Czechoslovakia	Pál von Hertzka (HUN)	Quarter-finals	12 June 1938
1954, Switzerland	7–8.	5.	József Bozsik	Red card	71'	Hungary	3–2	4–2	Brazil	Arthur Ellis (ENG)	Quarter-finals	27 June 1954
1954, Switzerland	7–8.	5.	Nílton Santos	Red card	71'	Brazil	2–3	2–4	Hungary	Arthur Ellis (ENG)	Quarter-finals	27 June 1954
1954, Switzerland	9.	5.	Humberto Tozzi	Red card	79'	Brazil	2–3	2–4	Hungary	Arthur Ellis (ENG)	Quarter-finals	27 June 1954
1958, Sweden	10.	6.	Ferenc Sipos	Red card	79'	Hungary	1–2	1–2	Wales	Nikolay Latyshev (URS)	Group stage	17 June 1958
1958, Sweden	11.	7.	Titus Buberník	Red card	102'	Czechoslovakia	1–2	1–2^{aet}	Northern Ireland	Maurice Guigue (FRA)	Group stage	17 June 1958
1958, Sweden	12.	8.	Erich Juskowiak	Red card	59'	West Germany	1–1	1–3	Sweden	István Zsolt (HUN)	Semi-finals	24 June 1958
1962, Chile	13.	9.	Giorgio Ferrini	Red card	8'	Italy	0–0	0–2	Chile	Ken Aston (ENG)	Group stage	2 June 1962
1962, Chile	14.	9.	Mario David	Red card	41'	Italy	0–0	0–2	Chile	Ken Aston (ENG)	Group stage	2 June 1962
1962, Chile	15–16.	10.	Ángel Cabrera	Red card	71'	Uruguay	1–3	1–3	Yugoslavia	Karol Galba (TCH)	Group stage	2 June 1962
1962, Chile	15–16.	10.	Vladica Popović	Red card	71'	Yugoslavia	3–1	3–1	Uruguay	Karol Galba (TCH)	Group stage	2 June 1962
1962, Chile	17.	11.	Honorino Landa	Red card	80'	Chile	2–4	2–4	Brazil	Arturo Yamasaki (PER)	Semi-finals	13 June 1962
1962, Chile	18.	11.	Garrincha	Red card	83'	Brazil	4–2	4–2	Chile	Arturo Yamasaki (PER)	Semi-finals	13 June 1962
1966, England	19.	12.	Rafael Albrecht	Red card	65'	Argentina	0–0	0–0	West Germany	Konstantin Zečević (YUG)	Group stage	16 July 1966
1966, England	20.	13.	Antonio Rattín	Yellowred card	35'	Argentina	0–0	0–1	England	Rudolf Kreitlein (FRG)	Quarter-finals	23 July 1966
1966, England	21.	14.	Horacio Troche	Red card	49'	Uruguay	0–1	0–4	West Germany	Jim Finney (ENG)	Quarter-finals	23 July 1966
1966, England	22.	14.	Héctor Silva	Yellowred card	54'	Uruguay	0–1	0–4	West Germany	Jim Finney (ENG)	Quarter-finals	23 July 1966
1966, England	23.	15.	Igor Chislenko	Red card	44'	Soviet Union	0–1	1–2	West Germany	Concetto Lo Bello (ITA)	Semi-finals	25 July 1966
1974, West Germany	24.	16.	Carlos Caszely	Yellowred card	67'	Chile	0–1	0–1	West Germany	Doğan Babacan (TUR)	First group stage	14 June 1974
1974, West Germany	25.	17.	Julio Montero Castillo	Red card	69'	Uruguay	0–1	0–2	Netherlands	Károly Palotai (HUN)	First group stage	15 June 1974
1974, West Germany	26.	18.	Ndaye Mulamba	Red card	23'	Zaire	0–4	0–9	Yugoslavia	Omar Delgado Gómez (COL)	First group stage	18 June 1974
1974, West Germany	27.	19.	Ray Richards	Yellowred card	83'	Australia	0–0	0–0	Chile	Jafar Namdar (IRN)	First group stage	22 June 1974
1974, West Germany	28.	20.	Luís Pereira	Red card	84'	Brazil	0–2	0–2	Netherlands	Kurt Tschenscher (FRG)	Second group stage	3 July 1974
1978, Argentina	29.	21.	András Törőcsik	Yellowred card	88'	Hungary	1–2	1–2	Argentina	António Garrido (POR)	First group stage	2 June 1978
1978, Argentina	30.	21.	Tibor Nyilasi	Yellowred card	89'	Hungary	1–2	1–2	Argentina	António Garrido (POR)	First group stage	2 June 1978
1978, Argentina	31.	22.	Dick Nanninga	Red card	88'	Netherlands	2–2	2–2	West Germany	Ramón Barreto (URU)	Second group stage	18 June 1978
1982, Spain	32.	23.	Ladislav Vízek	Red card	87'	Czechoslovakia	1–1	1–1	France	Paolo Casarin (ITA)	First group stage	24 June 1982
1982, Spain	33.	24.	Gilberto Yearwood	Red card	89'	Honduras	0–1	0–1	Yugoslavia	Gastón Castro (CHI)	First group stage	24 June 1982
1982, Spain	34.	25.	Mal Donaghy	Red card	62'	Northern Ireland	1–0	1–0	Spain	Héctor Ortiz (PAR)	First group stage	25 June 1982
1982, Spain	35.	26.	Américo Gallego	Red card	84'	Argentina	1–2	1–2	Italy	Nicolae Rainea (ROU)	Second group stage	29 June 1982
1982, Spain	36.	27.	Diego Maradona	Red card	85'	Argentina	0–3	1–3	Brazil	Mario Rubio Vázquez (MEX)	Second group stage	2 July 1982
1986, Mexico	37.	28.	Mike Sweeney	Yellowred card	85'	Canada	0–2	0–2	Hungary	Jamal Al-Sharif (SYR)	Group stage	6 June 1986
1986, Mexico	38.	29.	Ray Wilkins	Yellowred card	42'	England	0–0	0–0	Morocco	Gabriel González (PAR)	Group stage	6 June 1986
1986, Mexico	39.	30.	Basil Gorgis	Red card	52'	Iraq	0–2	1–2	Belgium	Jesús Díaz (COL)	Group stage	8 June 1986
1986, Mexico	40.	31.	Miguel Bossio	Yellowred card	19'	Uruguay	0–1	1–6	Denmark	Antonio Márquez Ramírez (MEX)	Group stage	8 June 1986
1986, Mexico	41.	32.	José Batista	Red card	1'	Uruguay	0–0	0–0	Scotland	Joël Quiniou (FRA)	Group stage	13 June 1986
1986, Mexico	42.	33.	Frank Arnesen	Yellowred card	88'	Denmark	2–0	2–0	West Germany	Alexis Ponnet (BEL)	Group stage	13 June 1986
1986, Mexico	43.	34.	Thomas Berthold	Red card	64'	West Germany	0–0	0–0^{aet} (4–1^{pen})	Mexico	Jesús Díaz (COL)	Quarter-finals	21 June 1986
1986, Mexico	44.	34.	Javier Aguirre	Yellowred card	100'	Mexico	0–0	0–0^{aet} (1–4^{pen})	West Germany	Jesús Díaz (COL)	Quarter-finals	21 June 1986
1990, Italy	45.	35.	André Kana-Biyik	Red card	61'	Cameroon	0–0	1–0	Argentina	Michel Vautrot (FRA)	Group stage	8 June 1990
1990, Italy	46.	35.	Benjamin Massing	Yellowred card	89'	Cameroon	1–0	1–0	Argentina	Michel Vautrot (FRA)	Group stage	8 June 1990
1990, Italy	47.	36.	Eric Wynalda	Red card	52'	United States	0–3	1–5	Czechoslovakia	Kurt Röthlisberger (SUI)	Group stage	10 June 1990
1990, Italy	48.	37.	Volodymyr Bezsonov	Red card	48'	Soviet Union	0–1	0–2	Argentina	Erik Fredriksson (SWE)	Group stage	13 June 1990
1990, Italy	49.	38.	Eric Gerets	Yellowred card	42'	Belgium	2–0	3–1	Uruguay	Siegfried Kirschen (GDR)	Group stage	17 June 1990
1990, Italy	50.	39.	Khalil Ghanim	Yellowred card	76'	United Arab Emirates	1–3	1–4	Yugoslavia	Shizuo Takada (JPN)	Group stage	19 June 1990
1990, Italy	51.	40.	Peter Artner	Red card	34'	Austria	0–0	2–1	United States	Jamal Al-Sharif (SYR)	Group stage	19 June 1990
1990, Italy	52.	41.	Yoon Deok-yeo	Yellowred card	70'	South Korea	0–0	0–1	Uruguay	Tullio Lanese (ITA)	Group stage	21 June 1990
1990, Italy	53.	42.	Ricardo Gomes	Red card	85'	Brazil	0–1	0–1	Argentina	Joël Quiniou (FRA)	Round of 16	24 June 1990
1990, Italy	54–55.	43.	Rudi Völler	Red card	22'	West Germany	0–0	2–1	Netherlands	Juan Carlos Loustau (ARG)	Round of 16	24 June 1990
1990, Italy	54–55.	43.	Frank Rijkaard	Red card	22'	Netherlands	0–0	1–2	West Germany	Juan Carlos Loustau (ARG)	Round of 16	24 June 1990
1990, Italy	56.	44.	Refik Šabanadžović	Red card	31'	Yugoslavia	0–0	0–0^{aet} (2–3^{pen})	Argentina	Kurt Röthlisberger (SUI)	Quarter-finals	30 June 1990
1990, Italy	57.	45.	Ľubomír Moravčík	Yellowred card	70'	Czechoslovakia	0–1	0–1	West Germany	Helmut Kohl (AUT)	Quarter-finals	1 July 1990
1990, Italy	58.	46.	Ricardo Giusti	Red card	103'	Argentina	1–1	1–1^{aet} (4–3^{pen})	Italy	Michel Vautrot (FRA)	Semi-finals	3 July 1990
1990, Italy	59.	47.	Pedro Monzón	Red card	65'	Argentina	0–0	0–1	West Germany	Edgardo Codesal (MEX)	Final	8 July 1990
1990, Italy	60.	47.	Gustavo Dezotti	Yellowred card	87'	Argentina	0–1	0–1	West Germany	Edgardo Codesal (MEX)	Final	8 July 1990
1994, United States	61.	48.	Marco Etcheverry	Red card	84'	Bolivia	0–1	0–1	Germany	Arturo Brizio Carter (MEX)	Group stage	17 June 1994
1994, United States	62.	49.	Miguel Ángel Nadal	Red card	26'	Spain	0–0	2–2	South Korea	Peter Mikkelsen (DEN)	Group stage	17 June 1994
1994, United States	63.	50.	Ion Vlădoiu	Red card	74'	Romania	1–4	1–4	Switzerland	Neji Jouini (TUN)	Group stage	22 June 1994
1994, United States	64.	51.	Gianluca Pagliuca	Red card	21'	Italy	0–0	1–0	Norway	Hellmut Krug (GER)	Group stage	23 June 1994
1994, United States	65.	52.	Luis Cristaldo	Yellowred card	82'	Bolivia	0–0	0–0	South Korea	Leslie Mottram (SCO)	Group stage	23 June 1994
1994, United States	66.	53.	Rigobert Song	Red card	63'	Cameroon	0–1	0–3	Brazil	Arturo Brizio Carter (MEX)	Group stage	24 June 1994
1994, United States	67.	54.	Sergei Gorlukovich	Yellowred card	49'	Russia	1–1	1–3	Sweden	Joël Quiniou (FRA)	Group stage	24 June 1994
1994, United States	68.	55.	Tsanko Tsvetanov	Yellowred card	67'	Bulgaria	1–0	2–0	Argentina	Neji Jouini (TUN)	Group stage	30 June 1994
1994, United States	69.	56.	Leonardo Araújo	Red card	43'	Brazil	0–0	1–0	United States	Joël Quiniou (FRA)	Round of 16	4 July 1994
1994, United States	70.	56.	Fernando Clavijo	Yellowred card	85'	United States	0–1	0–1	Brazil	Joël Quiniou (FRA)	Round of 16	4 July 1994
1994, United States	71.	57.	Gianfranco Zola	Red card	76'	Italy	0–1	2–1^{aet}	Nigeria	Arturo Brizio Carter (MEX)	Round of 16	5 July 1994
1994, United States	72.	58.	Emil Kremenliev	Yellowred card	50'	Bulgaria	1–1	1–1^{aet} (3–1^{pen})	Mexico	Jamal Al-Sharif (SYR)	Round of 16	5 July 1994
1994, United States	73.	58.	Luis García	Yellowred card	57'	Mexico	1–1	1–1^{aet} (1–3^{pen})	Bulgaria	Jamal Al-Sharif (SYR)	Round of 16	5 July 1994
1994, United States	74.	59.	Stefan Schwarz	Yellowred card	101'	Sweden	1–1	2–2^{aet} (5–4^{pen})	Romania	Philip Don (ENG)	Quarter-finals	10 July 1994
1994, United States	75.	60.	Jonas Thern	Red card	64'	Sweden	0–0	0–1	Brazil	José Torres Cadena (COL)	Semi-finals	13 July 1994
1998, France	76.	61.	Anatoli Nankov	Yellowred card	89'	Bulgaria	0–0	0–0	Paraguay	Abdul Rahman Al-Zaid (KSA)	Group stage	12 June 1998
1998, France	77.	62.	Ha Seok-ju	Red card	30'	South Korea	1–0	1–3	Mexico	Günter Benkö (AUT)	Group stage	13 June 1998
1998, France	78.	63.	Patrick Kluivert	Red card	79'	Netherlands	0–0	0–0	Belgium	Pierluigi Collina (ITA)	Group stage	13 June 1998
1998, France	79.	64.	Raymond Kalla	Red card	43'	Cameroon	0–1	0–3	Italy	Eddie Lennie (AUS)	Group stage	17 June 1998
1998, France	80.	65.	Miklos Molnar	Red card	67'	Denmark	1–1	1–1	South Africa	John Toro Rendón (COL)	Group stage	18 June 1998
1998, France	81.	65.	Alfred Phiri	Yellowred card	68'	South Africa	1–1	1–1	Denmark	John Toro Rendón (COL)	Group stage	18 June 1998
1998, France	82.	65.	Morten Wieghorst	Red card	85'	Denmark	1–1	1–1	South Africa	John Toro Rendón (COL)	Group stage	18 June 1998
1998, France	83.	66.	Mohammed Al-Khilaiwi	Red card	19'	Saudi Arabia	0–0	0–4	France	Arturo Brizio Carter (MEX)	Group stage	18 June 1998
1998, France	84.	66.	Zinedine Zidane	Red card	71'	France	2–0	4–0	Saudi Arabia	Arturo Brizio Carter (MEX)	Group stage	18 June 1998
1998, France	85.	67.	Pável Pardo	Red card	28'	Mexico	0–0	2–2	Belgium	Hugh Dallas (SCO)	Group stage	20 June 1998
1998, France	86.	67.	Gert Verheyen	Red card	54'	Belgium	2–0	2–2	Mexico	Hugh Dallas (SCO)	Group stage	20 June 1998
1998, France	87.	68.	Darryl Powell	Yellowred card	45+1'	Jamaica	0–1	0–5	Argentina	Rune Pedersen (NOR)	Group stage	21 June 1998
1998, France	88.	69.	Rigobert Song	Yellowred card	51'	Cameroon	0–1	1–1	Chile	László Vágner (HUN)	Group stage	23 June 1998
1998, France	89.	69.	Lauren	Red card	89'	Cameroon	1–1	1–1	Chile	László Vágner (HUN)	Group stage	23 June 1998
1998, France	90.	70.	Craig Burley	Red card	54'	Scotland	0–2	0–3	Morocco	Ali Bujsaim (UAE)	Group stage	23 June 1998
1998, France	91.	71.	Ramón Ramírez	Red card	89'	Mexico	1–2	2–2	Netherlands	Abdul Rahman Al-Zaid (KSA)	Group stage	25 June 1998
1998, France	92.	72.	David Beckham	Red card	47'	England	2–2	2–2^{aet} (3–4^{pen})	Argentina	Kim Milton Nielsen (DEN)	Round of 16	30 June 1998
1998, France	93.	73.	Arthur Numan	Yellowred card	76'	Netherlands	1–1	2–1	Argentina	Arturo Brizio Carter (MEX)	Quarter-finals	4 July 1998
1998, France	94.	73.	Ariel Ortega	Red card	87'	Argentina	1–1	1–2	Netherlands	Arturo Brizio Carter (MEX)	Quarter-finals	4 July 1998
1998, France	95.	74.	Christian Wörns	Red card	40'	Germany	0–0	0–3	Croatia	Rune Pedersen (NOR)	Quarter-finals	4 July 1998
1998, France	96.	75.	Laurent Blanc	Red card	74'	France	2–1	2–1	Croatia	José María García-Aranda (ESP)	Semi-finals	8 July 1998
1998, France	97.	76.	Marcel Desailly	Yellowred card	68'	France	2–0	3–0	Brazil	Said Belqola (MAR)	Final	12 July 1998
2002, South Korea / Japan	98.	77.	Boris Živković	Red card	59'	Croatia	0–0	0–1	Mexico	Lu Jun (CHN)	Group stage	3 June 2002
2002, South Korea / Japan	99.	78.	Alpay Özalan	Red card	86'	Turkey	1–1	1–2	Brazil	Kim Young-joo (KOR)	Group stage	3 June 2002
2002, South Korea / Japan	100.	78.	Hakan Ünsal	Yellowred card	90+4'	Turkey	1–2	1–2	Brazil	Kim Young-joo (KOR)	Group stage	3 June 2002
2002, South Korea / Japan	101.	79.	Salif Diao	Red card	80'	Senegal	1–1	1–1	Denmark	Carlos Batres (GUA)	Group stage	6 June 2002
2002, South Korea / Japan	102.	80.	Thierry Henry	Red card	25'	France	0–0	0–0	Uruguay	Felipe Ramos Rizo (MEX)	Group stage	6 June 2002
2002, South Korea / Japan	103.	81.	Carsten Ramelow	Yellowred card	40'	Germany	0–0	2–0	Cameroon	Antonio López Nieto (ESP)	Group stage	11 June 2002
2002, South Korea / Japan	104.	81.	Patrick Suffo	Yellowred card	77'	Cameroon	0–1	0–2	Germany	Antonio López Nieto (ESP)	Group stage	11 June 2002
2002, South Korea / Japan	105.	82.	Claudio Caniggia (from substitutes' bench)	Red card	45+2’	Argentina	0–0	1–1	Sweden	Ali Bujsaim (UAE)	Group stage	12 June 2002
2002, South Korea / Japan	106.	83.	Carlos Paredes	Yellowred card	22'	Paraguay	0–0	3–1	Slovenia	Felipe Ramos Rizo (MEX)	Group stage	12 June 2002
2002, South Korea / Japan	107.	83.	Nastja Čeh	Red card	81'	Slovenia	1–2	1–3	Paraguay	Felipe Ramos Rizo (MEX)	Group stage	12 June 2002
2002, South Korea / Japan	108.	84.	Shao Jiayi	Red card	58'	China	0–2	0–3	Turkey	Óscar Ruiz (COL)	Group stage	13 June 2002
2002, South Korea / Japan	109.	85.	João Pinto	Red card	27'	Portugal	0–0	0–1	South Korea	Ángel Sánchez (ARG)	Group stage	14 June 2002
2002, South Korea / Japan	110.	85.	Beto	Yellowred card	66'	Portugal	0–0	0–1	South Korea	Ángel Sánchez (ARG)	Group stage	14 June 2002
2002, South Korea / Japan	111.	86.	Roberto Acuña	Red card	90+2'	Paraguay	0–1	0–1	Germany	Carlos Batres (GUA)	Round of 16	15 June 2002
2002, South Korea / Japan	112.	87.	Rafael Márquez	Red card	88'	Mexico	0–2	0–2	United States	Vítor Melo Pereira (POR)	Round of 16	17 June 2002
2002, South Korea / Japan	113.	88.	Francesco Totti	Yellowred card	103'	Italy	1–1	1–2^{aet}	South Korea	Byron Moreno (ECU)	Round of 16	18 June 2002
2002, South Korea / Japan	114.	89.	Ronaldinho	Red card	57'	Brazil	2–1	2–1	England	Felipe Ramos Rizo (MEX)	Quarter-finals	21 June 2002
2006, Germany	115.	90.	Avery John	Yellowred card	46'	Trinidad and Tobago	0–0	0–0	Sweden	Shamsul Maidin (SIN)	Group stage	10 June 2006
2006, Germany	116.	91.	Jean-Paul Abalo	Yellowred card	53'	Togo	1–0	1–2	South Korea	Graham Poll (ENG)	Group stage	13 June 2006
2006, Germany	117.	92.	Vladyslav Vashchuk	Red card	47'	Ukraine	0–2	0–4	Spain	Massimo Busacca (SUI)	Group stage	14 June 2006
2006, Germany	118.	93.	Radosław Sobolewski	Yellowred card	75'	Poland	0–0	0–1	Germany	Luis Medina Cantalejo (ESP)	Group stage	14 June 2006
2006, Germany	119.	94.	Mateja Kežman	Red card	65'	Serbia and Montenegro	0–3	0–6	Argentina	Roberto Rosetti (ITA)	Group stage	16 June 2006
2006, Germany	120.	95.	André Macanga	Yellowred card	79'	Angola	0–0	0–0	Mexico	Shamsul Maidin (SIN)	Group stage	16 June 2006
2006, Germany	121.	96.	Tomáš Ujfaluši	Red card	66'	Czech Republic	0–1	0–2	Ghana	Horacio Elizondo (ARG)	Group stage	17 June 2006
2006, Germany	122.	97.	Daniele De Rossi	Red card	28'	Italy	1–1	1–1	United States	Jorge Larrionda (URU)	Group stage	17 June 2006
2006, Germany	123.	97.	Pablo Mastroeni	Red card	45'	United States	1–1	1–1	Italy	Jorge Larrionda (URU)	Group stage	17 June 2006
2006, Germany	124.	97.	Eddie Pope	Yellowred card	47'	United States	1–1	1–1	Italy	Jorge Larrionda (URU)	Group stage	17 June 2006
2006, Germany	125.	98.	Luis Ernesto Pérez	Yellowred card	61'	Mexico	1–2	1–2	Portugal	Ľuboš Micheľ (SVK)	Group stage	21 June 2006
2006, Germany	126.	99.	Albert Nađ	Yellowred card	45+1'	Serbia and Montenegro	2–1	2–3	Ivory Coast	Marco Antonio Rodríguez (MEX)	Group stage	21 June 2006
2006, Germany	127.	99.	Cyril Domoraud	Yellowred card	90+2'	Ivory Coast	3–2	3–2	Serbia and Montenegro	Marco Antonio Rodríguez (MEX)	Group stage	21 June 2006
2006, Germany	128.	100.	Jan Polák	Yellowred card	45+2'	Czech Republic	0–1	0–2	Italy	Benito Archundia (MEX)	Group stage	22 June 2006
2006, Germany	129.	101.	Dario Šimić	Yellowred card	85'	Croatia	2–2	2–2	Australia	Graham Poll (ENG)	Group stage	22 June 2006
2006, Germany	130.	101.	Brett Emerton	Yellowred card	87'	Australia	2–2	2–2	Croatia	Graham Poll (ENG)	Group stage	22 June 2006
2006, Germany	131.	101.	Josip Šimunić (Note: By a mistake of the referee's, Šimunić remained on the pitch after the second booking, and was only sent off after a third one.) (after final whistle)	Yellowred card	90+3'	Croatia	2–2	2–2	Australia	Graham Poll (ENG)	Group stage	22 June 2006
2006, Germany	132.	102.	Ziad Jaziri	Yellowred card	45+1'	Tunisia	0–0	0–1	Ukraine	Carlos Amarilla (PAR)	Group stage	23 June 2006
2006, Germany	133.	103.	Teddy Lučić	Yellowred card	35'	Sweden	0–2	0–2	Germany	Carlos Eugênio Simon (BRA)	Round of 16	24 June 2006
2006, Germany	134.	104.	Costinha	Yellowred card	45+1'	Portugal	1–0	1–0	Netherlands	Valentin Ivanov (RUS)	Round of 16	25 June 2006
2006, Germany	135.	104.	Khalid Boulahrouz	Yellowred card	64'	Netherlands	0–1	0–1	Portugal	Valentin Ivanov (RUS)	Round of 16	25 June 2006
2006, Germany	136.	104.	Deco	Yellowred card	78'	Portugal	1–0	1–0	Netherlands	Valentin Ivanov (RUS)	Round of 16	25 June 2006
2006, Germany	137.	104.	Giovanni van Bronckhorst	Yellowred card	90+5'	Netherlands	0–1	0–1	Portugal	Valentin Ivanov (RUS)	Round of 16	25 June 2006
2006, Germany	138.	105.	Marco Materazzi	Red card	51'	Italy	0–0	1–0	Australia	Luis Medina Cantalejo (ESP)	Round of 16	26 June 2006
2006, Germany	139.	106.	Asamoah Gyan	Yellowred card	81'	Ghana	0–2	0–3	Brazil	Ľuboš Micheľ (SVK)	Round of 16	27 June 2006
2006, Germany	140.	107.	Leandro Cufré (after penalty shoot-out, from substitutes' bench)	Red card	120'	Argentina	1–1	1–1^{aet} (2–4^{pen})	Germany	Ľuboš Micheľ (SVK)	Quarter-finals	30 June 2006
2006, Germany	141.	108.	Wayne Rooney	Red card	62'	England	0–0	0–0^{aet} (1–3^{pen})	Portugal	Horacio Elizondo (ARG)	Quarter-finals	1 July 2006
2006, Germany	142.	109.	Zinedine Zidane	Red card	110'	France	1–1	1–1^{aet} (3–5^{pen})	Italy	Horacio Elizondo (ARG)	Final	9 July 2006
2010, South Africa	143.	110.	Nicolás Lodeiro	Yellowred card	81'	Uruguay	0–0	0–0	France	Yuichi Nishimura (JPN)	Group stage	11 June 2010
2010, South Africa	144.	111.	Abdelkader Ghezzal	Yellowred card	73'	Algeria	0–0	0–1	Slovenia	Carlos Batres (GUA)	Group stage	13 June 2010
2010, South Africa	145.	112.	Aleksandar Luković	Yellowred card	74'	Serbia	0–0	0–1	Ghana	Héctor Baldassi (ARG)	Group stage	13 June 2010
2010, South Africa	146.	113.	Tim Cahill	Red card	56'	Australia	0–2	0–4	Germany	Marco Antonio Rodríguez (MEX)	Group stage	13 June 2010
2010, South Africa	147.	114.	Itumeleng Khune	Red card	76'	South Africa	0–1	0–3	Uruguay	Massimo Busacca (SUI)	Group stage	16 June 2010
2010, South Africa	148.	115.	Sani Kaita	Red card	33'	Nigeria	1–0	1–2	Greece	Óscar Ruiz (COL)	Group stage	17 June 2010
2010, South Africa	149.	116.	Miroslav Klose	Yellowred card	37'	Germany	0–0	0–1	Serbia	Alberto Undiano Mallenco (ESP)	Group stage	18 June 2010
2010, South Africa	150.	117.	Harry Kewell	Red card	24'	Australia	1–0	1–1	Ghana	Roberto Rosetti (ITA)	Group stage	19 June 2010
2010, South Africa	151.	118.	Kaká	Yellowred card	88'	Brazil	3–1	3–1	Ivory Coast	Stéphane Lannoy (FRA)	Group stage	20 June 2010
2010, South Africa	152.	119.	Valon Behrami	Red card	31'	Switzerland	0–0	0–1	Chile	Khalil Al-Ghamdi (KSA)	Group stage	21 June 2010
2010, South Africa	153.	120.	Yoann Gourcuff	Red card	25'	France	0–1	1–2	South Africa	Óscar Ruiz (COL)	Group stage	22 June 2010
2010, South Africa	154.	121.	Antar Yahia	Yellowred card	90+3'	Algeria	0–1	0–1	United States	Frank De Bleeckere (BEL)	Group stage	23 June 2010
2010, South Africa	155.	122.	Marco Estrada	Yellowred card	37'	Chile	0–2	1–2	Spain	Marco Antonio Rodríguez (MEX)	Group stage	25 June 2010
2010, South Africa	156.	123.	Ricardo Costa	Red card	89'	Portugal	0–1	0–1	Spain	Héctor Baldassi (ARG)	Round of 16	29 June 2010
2010, South Africa	157.	124.	Felipe Melo	Red card	73'	Brazil	1–2	1–2	Netherlands	Yuichi Nishimura (JPN)	Quarter-finals	2 July 2010
2010, South Africa	158.	125.	Luis Suárez	Red card	120+1'	Uruguay	1–1	1–1^{aet} (4–2^{pen})	Ghana	Olegário Benquerença (POR)	Quarter-finals	2 July 2010
2010, South Africa	159.	126.	John Heitinga	Yellowred card	109'	Netherlands	0–0	0–1^{aet}	Spain	Howard Webb (ENG)	Final	11 July 2010
2014, Brazil	160.	127.	Maxi Pereira	Red card	90+4'	Uruguay	1–3	1–3	Costa Rica	Felix Brych (GER)	Group stage	14 June 2014
2014, Brazil	161.	128.	Wilson Palacios	Yellowred card	44'	Honduras	0–0	0–3	France	Sandro Ricci (BRA)	Group stage	15 June 2014
2014, Brazil	162.	129.	Pepe	Red card	37'	Portugal	0–2	0–4	Germany	Milorad Mažić (SRB)	Group stage	16 June 2014
2014, Brazil	163.	130.	Alex Song	Red card	40'	Cameroon	0–1	0–4	Croatia	Pedro Proença (POR)	Group stage	18 June 2014
2014, Brazil	164.	131.	Kostas Katsouranis	Yellowred card	38'	Greece	0–0	0–0	Japan	Joel Aguilar (SLV)	Group stage	19 June 2014
2014, Brazil	165.	132.	Ante Rebić	Red card	89'	Croatia	1–3	1–3	Mexico	Ravshan Irmatov (UZB)	Group stage	23 June 2014
2014, Brazil	166.	133.	Claudio Marchisio	Red card	59'	Italy	0–0	0–1	Uruguay	Marco Antonio Rodríguez (MEX)	Group stage	24 June 2014
2014, Brazil	167.	134.	Antonio Valencia	Red card	48'	Ecuador	0–0	0–0	France	Noumandiez Doué (CIV)	Group stage	25 June 2014
2014, Brazil	168.	135.	Steven Defour	Red card	45'	Belgium	0–0	1–0	South Korea	Ben Williams (AUS)	Group stage	26 June 2014
2014, Brazil	169.	136.	Óscar Duarte	Yellowred card	66'	Costa Rica	1–0	1–1^{aet} (5–3^{pen})	Greece	Ben Williams (AUS)	Round of 16	29 June 2014
2018, Russia	170.	137.	Carlos Sánchez	Red card	4'	Colombia	0–0	1–2	Japan	Damir Skomina (SVN)	Group stage	19 June 2018
2018, Russia	171.	138.	Jérôme Boateng	Yellowred card	82'	Germany	1–1	2–1	Sweden	Szymon Marciniak (POL)	Group stage	23 June 2018
2018, Russia	172.	139.	Igor Smolnikov	Yellowred card	36'	Russia	0–2	0–3	Uruguay	Malang Diedhiou (SEN)	Group stage	25 June 2018
2018, Russia	173.	140.	Michael Lang	Red card	90+4'	Switzerland	0–1	0–1	Sweden	Damir Skomina (SVN)	Round of 16	3 July 2018
2022, Qatar	174.	141.	Wayne Hennessey	Red card	86'	Wales	0–0	0–2	Iran	Mario Escobar (GUA)	Group stage	25 November 2022
2022, Qatar	175.	142.	Vincent Aboubakar	Yellowred card	90+3'	Cameroon	1–0	1–0	Brazil	Ismail Elfath (USA)	Group stage	2 December 2022
2022, Qatar	176.	143.	Denzel Dumfries (after penalty shoot-out)	Yellowred card	120+8'	Netherlands	2–2	2–2^{aet} (3–4^{pen})	Argentina	Antonio Mateu Lahoz (ESP)	Quarter-finals	9 December 2022
2022, Qatar	177.	144.	Walid Cheddira	Yellowred card	90+3'	Morocco	1–0	1–0	Portugal	Facundo Tello (ARG)	Quarter-finals	10 December 2022
2026, Canada / Mexico / United States	178.	145.	Sphephelo Sithole	Red card	49'	South Africa	0–1	0–2	Mexico	Wilton Sampaio (BRA)	Group stage	11 June 2026
2026, Canada / Mexico / United States	179.	145.	Themba Zwane	Red card	84'	South Africa	0–2	0–2	Mexico	Wilton Sampaio (BRA)	Group stage	11 June 2026
2026, Canada / Mexico / United States	180.	145.	César Montes	Red card	90+2'	Mexico	2–0	2–0	South Africa	Wilton Sampaio (BRA)	Group stage	11 June 2026
2026, Canada / Mexico / United States	181.	146.	Tarik Muharemović	Red card	80'	Bosnia and Herzegovina	0–1	1–4	Switzerland	João Pinheiro (POR)	Group stage	18 June 2026
2026, Canada / Mexico / United States	182.	147.	Homam Ahmed	Red card	33'	Qatar	0–2	0–6	Canada	Cristián Garay (CHI)	Group stage	18 June 2026
2026, Canada / Mexico / United States	183.	147.	Assim Madibo	Red card	55'	Qatar	0–3	0–6	Canada	Cristián Garay (CHI)	Group stage	18 June 2026
2026, Canada / Mexico / United States	184.	148.	Miguel Almirón	Red card	45+3'	Paraguay	1–0	1–0	Turkey	Iván Barton (SLV)	Group stage	19 June 2026
2026, Canada / Mexico / United States	185.	149.	Nathan Ngoy	Red card	66'	Belgium	0–0	0–0	Iran	Darío Herrera (ARG)	Group stage	21 June 2026
2026, Canada / Mexico / United States	186.	150.	Rebin Sulaka	Red card	13'	Iraq	0–1	0–5	Senegal	Anthony Taylor (ENG)	Group stage	26 June 2026
2026, Canada / Mexico / United States	187.	151.	Agustín Canobbio	Red card	90+5'	Uruguay	0–1	0–1	Spain	Ismail Elfath (USA)	Group stage	26 June 2026
2026, Canada / Mexico / United States	188.	152.	Piero Hincapié	Red card	90+5'	Ecuador	0–2	0–2	Mexico	Slavko Vinčić (SVN)	Round of 32	30 June 2026
2026, Canada / Mexico / United States	189.	153.	Folarin Balogun	Red card	64'	United States	1–0	2–0	Bosnia and Herzegovina	Raphael Claus (BRA)	Round of 32	1 July 2026
2026, Canada / Mexico / United States	190.	154.	Jarell Quansah	Red card	54'	England	2–1	3–2	Mexico	Alireza Faghani (AUS)	Round of 16	5 July 2026
2026, Canada / Mexico / United States	191.	155.	Breel Embolo	Yellowred card	72'	Switzerland	1–1	1–3^{aet}	Argentina	João Pinheiro (POR)	Quarter-finals	11 July 2026
2026, Canada / Mexico / United States	192.	156.	Enzo Fernández	Yellowred card	90+3'	Argentina	0–0	0–1^{aet}	Spain	Slavko Vinčić (SVN)	Final	19 July 2026

=== Team officials ===
Referees were granted the power to show yellow and red cards to team officials in the 2019–20 update to the IFAB Laws of the Game. The 2022 FIFA World Cup was the first World Cup in which team officials could be shown red cards; all red cards to team officials from 2022 and subsequent tournaments are shown below. Prior editions of the tournament, wherein referees could send off team officials without physically showing a red card, are not included in this table.

Tournament	#	M	Team official	Role	T	Time	Representing	At score	Final score	Opponent	Referee	Round	Date
2022, Qatar	1	1	(Portugal) Paulo Bento	Manager	Red card	after match	South Korea	2–3	2–3	Ghana	Anthony Taylor (ENG)	Group stage, match 2	28 November 2022
2022, Qatar	2	2	(Croatia) Mario Mandžukić	Assistant manager	Red card	35'	Croatia	0–1	0–3	Argentina	Daniele Orsato (ITA)	Semi-finals	13 December 2022
2026, Canada / Mexico / United States	3	3	(Egypt) Saafan El-Sagheer	Goalkeeper coach	Red card	90+4'	Egypt	2–3	2–3	Argentina	François Letexier (FRA)	Round of 16	7 July 2026

== Players with multiple red cards ==
The following table lists the players who have received at least two red cards in World Cup tournaments.

Player	Country	Red cards	Matches
Rigobert Song	Cameroon	2	vs Brazil (1994) vs Chile (1998)
Zinedine Zidane	France	2	vs Saudi Arabia (1998) vs Italy (2006)

== See also ==
- List of UEFA European Championship red cards
- List of FIFA Confederations Cup red cards
