= List of World Cup red cards =

List of World Cup red cards may refer to:

- List of FIFA World Cup red cards
- List of Rugby World Cup red cards
