= Plácido Galindo =

Peruvian footballer (1906–1988)

Personal information
- Full name: Plácido Reynaldo Galindo Pando
- Date of birth: 9 March 1906
- Place of birth: Lima, Peru
- Date of death: 22 October 1988 (aged 82)
- Place of death: Lima, Peru
- Height: 1.65 m (5 ft 5 in)
- Position: Midfielder

Senior career*
| Years | Team | Apps | (Gls) |
| 1924–1933 | Universitario | | |

International career
- Peru
- * Club domestic league appearances and goals

Plácido Reynaldo Galindo Pando (9 March 1906 – 22 October 1988) was a Peruvian football midfielder who played for Peru in the 1930 FIFA World Cup, where he also became the first ever player sent off in a World Cup match. He also was a player, manager and president of Universitario de Deportes.

== Club career ==
Galindo played for Universitario de Deportes from 1924 to 1933. As part of a group of students of the University of San Marcos he founded the then called Federación Universitaria de Fútbol in 1924. The club played friendly matches until it was admitted in the first Peruvian Primera División tournament in 1928, in which it ended as runner up. The next year Galindo and the club won the 1929 Peruvian Primera División.

Galindo was part of the Peru-Chile XI, a squad of Peruvian and Chilean footballers of Alianza Lima, Atlético Chalaco, Colo-Colo and Universitario de Deportes that played 39 friendly matches in Europe between September 1933 and March 1934. His last match was against a Madrid XI on 8 December 1933.

== International career ==
Peru national team coach Francisco Bru called Galindo to the Peruvian squad for the 1930 FIFA World Cup. Galindo also took part in the 1929 South American Championship.

== Post-playing career ==
With Galindo as manager, Universitario lost the 1934 Peruvian Primera División championship on the last day of the tournament. Having been hurt by the defeat, when he was president of the Central Association of Football of Peru 22 years later, he unscrupulously began a historical farce that his team had won the tournament of 1934, trying to steal the title of that year from the Alianza Lima club.

He was president of Universitario in 1954–1956, 1956–1958 and 1958–1963. During his presidency the club won the 1959 and 1960 Peruvian titles.
