= List of UEFA European Championship red cards =

Red cards

The UEFA European Championship is an association football competition established in 1960. It is contested by the men's national teams of the members of the Union of European Football Associations (UEFA), the sport's European governing body, and takes place every four years. This list covers the Finals tournament only; qualifying matches are not included.

== Full list ==
Players who have been shown a red card in a UEFA European Championship match
Player	or	Time of card	Representing	At score	Final Score	Opponent	Tournament	Round	Date	Ref.
Alan Mullery	Red card	86'	England	0–1	0–1	Yugoslavia	UEFA Euro 1968	Semi-finals	5 June 1968	
Jaroslav Pollák	Red card	53'	Czechoslovakia	1–0	3–1 (a.e.t.)	Netherlands	UEFA Euro 1976	Semi-finals	16 June 1976	
Johan Neeskens	Red card	76'	Netherlands	1–1	1–3 (a.e.t.)	Czechoslovakia	UEFA Euro 1976	Semi-finals	16 June 1976	
Willem van Hanegem	Red card	115'	Netherlands	1–2	1–3 (a.e.t.)	Czechoslovakia	UEFA Euro 1976	Semi-finals	16 June 1976	
Manuel Amoros	Red card	87'	France	1–0	1–0	Denmark	UEFA Euro 1984	Group stage	12 June 1984	
Klaus Berggreen	Yellowred card	107'	Denmark	1–1	1–1 (a.e.t.)	Spain	UEFA Euro 1984	Semi-finals	24 June 1984	
Yvon Le Roux	Yellowred card	85'	France	1–0	2–0	Spain	UEFA Euro 1984	Final	27 June 1984	
Petar Hubchev	Red card	72'	Bulgaria	1–0	1–1	Spain	UEFA Euro 1996	Group stage	9 June 1996	
Juan Antonio Pizzi	Red card	75'	Spain	1–1	1–1	Bulgaria	UEFA Euro 1996	Group stage	9 June 1996	
Luigi Apolloni	Yellowred card	28'	Italy	1–1	1–2	Czech Republic	UEFA Euro 1996	Group stage	14 June 1996	
Yuri Kovtun	Red card	71'	Russia	0–1	0–3	Germany	UEFA Euro 1996	Group stage	16 June 1996	
Thomas Strunz	Yellowred card	60'	Germany	0–0	0–0	Italy	UEFA Euro 1996	Group stage	19 June 1996	
Igor Štimac	Red card	56'	Croatia	1–1	1–2	Germany	UEFA Euro 1996	Quarter-finals	23 June 1996	
Radoslav Látal	Yellowred card	82'	Czech Republic	1–0	1–0	Portugal	UEFA Euro 1996	Quarter-finals	23 June 1996	
Patrik Andersson	Yellowred card	81'	Sweden	1–2	1–2	Belgium	UEFA Euro 2000	Group stage	10 June 2000	
Radoslav Látal	Red card	90'	Czech Republic	0–1	0–1	Netherlands	UEFA Euro 2000	Group stage	11 June 2000	
Siniša Mihajlović	Yellowred card	59'	FR Yugoslavia	3–3	3–3	Slovenia	UEFA Euro 2000	Group stage	13 June 2000	
Mateja Kežman	Red card	88'	FR Yugoslavia	1–0	1–0	Norway	UEFA Euro 2000	Group stage	18 June 2000	
Filip De Wilde	Red card	84'	Belgium	0–2	0–2	Turkey	UEFA Euro 2000	Group stage	19 June 2000	
Slaviša Jokanović	Yellowred card	63'	FR Yugoslavia	2–2	3–4	Spain	UEFA Euro 2000	Group stage	21 June 2000	
Alpay Özalan	Red card	29'	Turkey	0–0	0–2	Portugal	UEFA Euro 2000	Quarter-finals	24 June 2000	
Gheorghe Hagi	Yellowred card	59'	Romania	0–2	0–2	Italy	UEFA Euro 2000	Quarter-finals	24 June 2000	
Nuno Gomes	Red card	117'	Portugal	1–2	1–2 (a.e.t.)	France	UEFA Euro 2000	Semi-finals	28 June 2000	
Gianluca Zambrotta	Yellowred card	34'	Italy	0–0	0–0 (a.e.t.)	Netherlands	UEFA Euro 2000	Semi-finals	29 June 2000	
Roman Sharonov	Yellowred card	88'	Russia	0–1	0–1	Spain	UEFA Euro 2004	Group stage	12 June 2004	
Johann Vogel	Yellowred card	50'	Switzerland	0–0	0–0	Croatia	UEFA Euro 2004	Group stage	13 June 2004	
Sergei Ovchinnikov	Red card	45'	Russia	0–1	0–2	Portugal	UEFA Euro 2004	Group stage	16 June 2004	
Bernt Haas	Yellowred card	60'	Switzerland	0–1	0–3	England	UEFA Euro 2004	Group stage	17 June 2004	
Stiliyan Petrov	Yellowred card	83'	Bulgaria	0–1	0–2	Denmark	UEFA Euro 2004	Group stage	18 June 2004	
John Heitinga	Yellowred card	75'	Netherlands	2–2	2–3	Czech Republic	UEFA Euro 2004	Group stage	19 June 2004	
Bastian Schweinsteiger	Red card	90+2'	Germany	1–2	1–2	Croatia	UEFA Euro 2008	Group stage	12 June 2008	
Volkan Demirel	Red card	90+2'	Turkey	3–2	3–2	Czech Republic	UEFA Euro 2008	Group stage	15 June 2008	
Eric Abidal	Red card	24'	France	0–0	0–2	Italy	UEFA Euro 2008	Group stage	17 June 2008	
Sokratis Papastathopoulos	Yellowred card	44'	Greece	0–1	1–1	Poland	UEFA Euro 2012	Group stage	8 June 2012	
Wojciech Szczęsny	Red card	69'	Poland	1–1	1–1	Greece	UEFA Euro 2012	Group stage	8 June 2012	
Keith Andrews	Yellowred card	89'	Republic of Ireland	0–1	0–2	Italy	UEFA Euro 2012	Group stage	18 June 2012	
Lorik Cana	Yellowred card	36'	Albania	0–1	0–1	Switzerland	UEFA Euro 2016	Group stage	11 June 2016	
Aleksandar Dragović	Yellowred card	66'	Austria	0–1	0–2	Hungary	UEFA Euro 2016	Group stage	14 June 2016	
Shane Duffy	Red card	66'	Republic of Ireland	1–2	1–2	France	UEFA Euro 2016	Round of 16	26 June 2016	
Grzegorz Krychowiak	Yellowred card	62'	Poland	1–1	1–2	Slovakia	UEFA Euro 2020	Group stage	14 June 2021	
Ethan Ampadu	Red card	55'	Wales	0–1	0–1	Italy	UEFA Euro 2020	Group stage	20 June 2021	
Harry Wilson	Red card	90'	Wales	0–3	0–4	Denmark	UEFA Euro 2020	Round of 16	26 June 2021	
Matthijs de Ligt	Red card	55'	Netherlands	0–0	0–2	Czech Republic	UEFA Euro 2020	Round of 16	27 June 2021	
Marcus Danielson	Red card	99'	Sweden	1–1	1–2 (a.e.t.)	Ukraine	UEFA Euro 2020	Round of 16	30 June 2021	
Remo Freuler	Red card	77'	Switzerland	1–1	1–1 (a.e.t.)	Spain	UEFA Euro 2020	Quarter-finals	2 July 2021	
Ryan Porteous	Red card	44'	Scotland	0–2	1–5	Germany	UEFA Euro 2024	Group stage	14 June 2024	
Antonín Barák	Yellowred card	20'	Czech Republic	0–0	1–2	Turkey	UEFA Euro 2024	Group stage	26 June 2024	
Tomáš Chorý	Red card	90+8'	Czech Republic	1–2	1–2	Turkey	UEFA Euro 2024	Group stage	26 June 2024	
Dani Carvajal	Yellowred card	120+6'	Spain	2–1	2–1	Germany	UEFA Euro 2024	Quarter-finals	5 July 2024	
Bertuğ Yıldırım	Red card	90+6'	Turkey	1–2	1–2	Netherlands	UEFA Euro 2024	Quarter-finals	6 July 2024	

== Players with multiple red cards ==
The following table lists the players who have received at least two red cards in European Championship tournaments.

Player	Country	Red cards	Matches
Radoslav Látal	Czech Republic	2	vs Portugal (1996) vs Netherlands (2000)

== Multiple red cards received by country ==
As of UEFA Euro 2024

Number	Country	Matches
5	Czech Republic (Note: Includes a red card in 1976 for Czechoslovakia's Jaroslav Pollák.)	vs Netherlands in 1976, Portugal in 1996, Netherlands in 2000 and Turkey in 2024 (2)
4	Netherlands	vs Czechoslovakia in 1976 (2), Czech Republic in 2004 and Czech Republic in 2020
3	France	vs Denmark in 1984, Spain in 1984 and Italy in 2008
3	Russia	vs Germany in 1996, Spain in 2004 and Portugal in 2004
3	Switzerland	vs Croatia in 2004, England in 2004 and Spain in 2020
3	Turkey	vs Portugal in 2000, Czech Republic in 2008 and Netherlands in 2024
3	FR Yugoslavia	vs Slovenia in 2000, Norway in 2000 and Spain in 2000
2	Bulgaria	vs Spain in 1996 and Denmark in 2004
2	Germany	vs Italy in 1996 and Croatia in 2008
2	Italy	vs Czech Republic in 1996 and Netherlands in 2000
2	Poland	vs Greece in 2012 and Slovakia in 2020
2	Republic of Ireland	vs Italy in 2012 and France in 2016
2	Spain	vs Bulgaria in 1996 and Germany in 2024
2	Sweden	vs Belgium in 2000 and Ukraine in 2020
2	Wales	vs Italy in 2020 and Denmark in 2020

== See also ==
- List of FIFA World Cup red cards
- List of FIFA Confederations Cup red cards
