= Arturo Brizio Carter =

Mexican football referee (born 1956)

- Full name: Arturo Brizio Carter
- Born: 9 March 1956 (age 70); Mexico

International
Years	League	Role
1987–2000	FIFA	Referee

Arturo Brizio Carter (born 9 March 1956) is a Mexican former association football referee. He is mostly known for supervising six matches in the FIFA World Cup, three each in 1994 and 1998. He gave seven red cards (a record for the tournament) and 29 yellow cards in those six matches.

He was the first referee to wear a coloured uniform in the World Cup.
