= Søren Busk =

Danish footballer (born 1953)

Personal information
- Full name: Søren Thomas Busk
- Date of birth: 10 April 1953 (age 73)
- Place of birth: Glostrup, Denmark
- Height: 1.83 m (6 ft 0 in)
- Position: Defender

Youth career
- 1960–1973: Glostrup IC

Senior career*
| Years | Team | Apps | (Gls) |
| 1973–1976 | Glostrup IC | | |
| 1977–1979 | Westfalia Herne | 105 | (16) |
| 1979–1982 | MVV | 72 | (0) |
| 1982–1985 | Gent | 64 | (0) |
| 1985–1986 | MVV | 30 | (4) |
| 1986–1987 | Monaco | 37 | (3) |
| 1987–1988 | Wiener SC | 26 | (1) |
| 1988–1990 | Herfølge | 22 | (3) |

International career
| 1979–1988 | Denmark | 61 | (2) |
- * Club domestic league appearances and goals

Søren Thomas Busk (born 10 April 1953) is a Danish former footballer who played as a defender. He usually played either right-back or in central defence. He played professionally for a number of European clubs, and helped Gent win the Belgian Cup. He gained 61 caps and scored two goals for the Denmark national football team and represented Denmark at the Euro 1984, 1986 World Cup, and Euro 1988 tournaments.

== Biography ==
Born in Glostrup, Busk started his senior career with local club Glostrup IC. He moved abroad in 1976, 23 years of age, to play professionally with Westfalia Herne in the German 2. Bundesliga. In his first season with Herne, Busk scored 12 goals in 32 games. He stayed three seasons with Herne, playing a total 105 games and scoring 16 goals for the club in the 2. Bundesliga. While at Herne, Busk was called up for the Danish national team, and he made his international debut in May 1979. He played three international games while at Herne. In the summer 1979, Busk moved to Dutch club MVV Maastricht in the Eredivisie championship. With MVV, he finished 11th in the Eredivisie 1979–80 season and eighth in the 1980–81 Eredivisie season. MVV finished 16th in the 1981–82 Eredivisie season and were relegated to the secondary Eerste Divisie league, and Busk left the club in the summer 1982.

He moved to Belgian club K.A.A. Gent in the Belgian First Division A. He was named Gent's player of the year, each of his three years at the club, and helped Gent win the 1984 Belgian Cup trophy. Busk was called up to represent Denmark at the 1984 European Championships. He operated as a right-back in Denmark's first three games against France, Yugoslavia, and Belgium, but switched to the other flank for the Danes' dramatic semi-final against Spain in Lyon, with John Sivebæk coming in on the other side of the defence. In the summer 1985, Busk moved back to play for MVV Maastricht. While playing for MVV, he was a part of the Denmark team at the 1986 World Cup. Busk played well in the first round as Denmark topped the group, but endured a torrid time during their second-round 5–1 defeat to Spain, and conceded one of the two penalties given away by the Danes in the second half.

After the World Cup, Busk moved to play for French club AS Monaco in the Ligue 1 championship in the summer 1986. He played one season with Monaco, before leaving the club in the summer 1987. He joined Austrian club Wiener SC in the Austrian Football Bundesliga, playing one season for the club. While at Wiener SC, Busk represented Denmark at the 1988 European Championships, playing in Denmark's first game at the tournament. After the European Championship, Busk ended his international career, and moved back to Denmark in the summer 1988.

He started playing for Herfølge BK in 1988. In 1989, he was named sports director of Herfølge, occupying the job for one-and-a-half year. He continued his active career while being sports director, and ended his playing career in 1990.

He went on to a job as a sales director in SELECT Sport A/S.

== Family ==
His granddaughter Mila Bischoff is also a footballer for Brøndby IF.

== Honours ==
- Belgian Cup: 1983–84
