= Hamzah Saleh =

Saudi Arabian footballer (born 1967)

Personal information
- Date of birth: 19 April 1967 (age 59)
- Place of birth: Medina, Saudi Arabia
- Height: 1.83 m (6 ft 0 in)
- Position: Midfielder

Senior career*
Years	Team	Apps	(Gls)
1991–2000	Al-Ahli		
2000–2001	Al-Ansar		
2001–2006	Ohod		

International career
1992–1998	Saudi Arabia	41	(0)
- * Club domestic league appearances and goals

Hamzah Saleh (Arabic: حمزة صالح; born 19 April 1967) is a Saudi Arabian former professional footballer who played as a midfielder.

He played for Al-Ahli and represented the Saudi Arabia national team at the 1994 and 1998 FIFA World Cups.
