= John Toro Rendón =

Colombian football referee

John Jairo Toro Rendón
- Full name: John Jairo Toro Rendón
- Born: 4 April 1958 (age 68); Colombia

Domestic
Years	League	Role

International
Years	League	Role
1991–1998	FIFA listed	Referee

John Jairo Toro Rendón (born April 4, 1958) is a retired Colombian football referee. He is known for having refereed one match in the 1998 FIFA World Cup in France, the Group C match between Denmark and South Africa, during which he handed out seven yellow cards and three reds.

In addition, he was a referee at the 1991 FIFA Women's World Cup.
