= Mohammed Al-Khilaiwi =

Saudi Arabian footballer (1971–2013)

Personal information
- Full name: Mohammed Saleh Al-Khilaiwi
- Date of birth: 21 August 1971
- Place of birth: Jeddah, Saudi Arabia
- Date of death: 13 June 2013 (aged 41)
- Place of death: Jeddah, Saudi Arabia
- Height: 1.83 m (6 ft 0 in)
- Position: Defender

Senior career*
Years	Team	Apps	(Gls)
1989–2002	Al-Ittihad	432	(19)
2003	Al Arabi		
2003–2005	Al-Ahli		
2006–2009	Ohod		

International career
1996	Saudi Arabia Olympic (O.P.)	3	(0)
1992–2001	Saudi Arabia	163	(3)
- * Club domestic league appearances and goals

Mohammed Saleh Al-Khilaiwi (Arabic: محمد الخليوي; 21 August 1971 – 13 June 2013) was a Saudi footballer who played as a defender. At the club level, he played mostly for Al-Ittihad in his home country. For the Saudi Arabia national team, he made 163 appearances, scoring 3 goals.

== Career ==
Between 1992 and 2001, Al-Khilaiwi played for Saudi Arabia national team. He played a total of 163 games for the national team. He is the second overall among Saudi Arabians players with most caps. His name is also listed among the list of footballers with 100 or more caps He played at the 1994 FIFA World Cup, and at the 1998 FIFA World Cup, where he was sent off against France. Zinedine Zidane was also sent off later in the same match. He was a participant in the 1992 FIFA Confederations Cup, 1995 FIFA Confederations Cup, 1997 FIFA Confederations Cup and 1999 FIFA Confederations Cup.

He also participated in the 1996 Summer Olympics.

== Death ==
Al-Khilaiwi died on the night of 13 June 2013 in Al-Salam hospital in Jeddah. He died from a heart failure.

== Honours ==
Al Ittihad

- Saudi Premier League: 1996–97, 1998–99, 1999–2000, 2000–01
- Crown Prince Cup: 1991, 1997, 2001
- Federation Cup: 1997, 1999
- GCC Champions League: 1999
- Asian Cup Winners' Cup: 1998–99
- Saudi-Egyptian Super Cup: 2001

Saudi Arabia

- AFC Asian Cup: 1996
- Arab Nations Cup: 1998
- Arabian Gulf Cup: 1994

== See also ==
- List of men's footballers with 100 or more international caps
