= Alfred Phiri =

South African soccer player (born 1974)

Personal information
- Full name: Alfred Maimane Phiri
- Date of birth: 22 June 1974 (age 52)
- Place of birth: Alexandra, South Africa
- Height: 1.74 m (5 ft 8 1/2 in)
- Position: Midfielder

Senior career*
Years	Team	Apps	(Gls)
1994	Alexandra United	22	(12)
1995–1996	Jomo Cosmos	11	(0)
1996–2001	Gençlerbirliği	116	(12)
1997–1998	→ Vanspor (loan)	21	(1)
2001–2002	Samsunspor	26	(0)
2002	Jomo Cosmos	4	(0)
2003–2004	Ajax Cape Town	34	(0)
2004–2006	Moroka Swallows	54	(7)
2006–2008	Supersport United	22	(0)
2008	Moroka Swallows	11	(2)
Total		321	(34)

International career
1998–2006	South Africa	13	(2)
- * Club domestic league appearances and goals

Alfred Maimane Phiri (born 22 June 1974) is a South African former soccer player who played as a midfielder.

He spent six seasons in Turkey playing mostly for Gençlerbirliği (Turkey), but also for Vanspor and Samsunspor. In South Africa, he started his career at Alexandra United and also played for Jomo Cosmos, Ajax Cape Town, Moroka Swallows and Supersport United.

He played for South Africa national soccer team and was in part of the squad that travelled to France for the 1998 FIFA World Cup.

== Honours ==
- Gençlerbirliği
  - Turkish Cup (1): 2001
