= Bo Johansson =

Swedish footballer (1942–2026)

Personal information
- Date of birth: 28 November 1942
- Place of birth: Kalmar, Sweden
- Date of death: 15 October 2026 (aged 83)
- Place of death: Kalmar, Sweden
- Position: Defender

Senior career*
Years	Team	Apps	(Gls)
1964-1973	Kalmar FF		
1974–1976	Lindsdals IF		

Managerial career
- 1973: Kalmar FF (player-manager)
- 1974–1976: Lindsdals IF (player-manager)
- 1977–1978: Kalmar FF
- 1979–1981: Östers IF
- 1982–1983: Kalmar FF
- 1984–1985: FK Jerv
- 1986–1988: Östers IF
- 1988–1989: Panionios
- 1990–1991: Iceland
- 1992–1994: Silkeborg IF
- 1995: HJK Helsinki
- 1995–1996: Kalamata
- 1996–2000: Denmark
- 2003–2004: IFK Göteborg
- 2005: Molde FK
- * Club domestic league appearances and goals

Bo "Bosse" Johansson (28 November 1942 – 15 October 2026) was a Swedish football player and coach.

== Career ==
Johansson was a player for fourteen years with Kalmar FF and Lindsdals IF, though he did not win any trophies as a player. In 1977, he was appointed coach for his former club of Kalmar FF, a job he held for two years before switching to local rivals Öster IF. He remained there for three years, leading Östers IF to back-to-back Swedish Allsvenskan championships in 1980 and 1981. Johansson went on to coach Norwegian club FK Jerv, Greek club Panionios, and started an international career coaching the Iceland national team. He had to wait 13 years for his next title, until 1994, when he led Danish team Silkeborg IF to the national Danish Superliga championship.

In 1996, he was appointed Denmark national team coach, taking over from Richard Møller Nielsen who had managed the Danish team to the Euro 1992 title, but had subsequently suffered lacklustre results. Bo Johansson presented a more offensive way of playing and he was successful in revitalising the Danish team, leading it to the 1998 World Cup in France, which was to become one of the heights in Danish football. Despite a loss in the group stage to later tournament winners France, Denmark managed to go through to the final 16 where they put an attractive style of football on display, beating Nigeria 4–1 before losing out 3–2 in the quarter-final to the later silver medalists from Brazil.

"Bosse" could not live up to the result and play at the 1998 World Cup and two years later at Euro 2000 in Belgium and the Netherlands. The Danish team lost all the games in the group stage and was eliminated. In 1999, Bo Johansson had made public that he would not continue with the team after the tournament. Following the Danish exit he was applauded off the pitch by the Danish fans. Totally, he coached the Danish national team throughout 40 matches, resulting in 17 victories, nine draws and 14 losses.

In 2003, he was appointed coach for the Swedish club IFK Göteborg, he retired in 2004. He made a comeback in 2005, leading Molde F.K. to victory in the Norwegian Cup. However, the club had a disappointing season in the league, and Johansson quit after the season. 2010, he returned to coaching as assisting coach in the Swedish club Åtvidaberg.

== Death ==
Johansson died in October 2026, at the age of 83.

== Honours ==
Östers IF

- Allsvenskan: 1980, 1981

Silkeborg IF

- Danish Superliga: 1994

Molde FK

- Norwegian Cup: 2005
