= 2005 FIFA Confederations Cup knockout stage =

Football tournament knockout stage

The knockout stage of the 2005 FIFA Confederations Cup began on 25 June and concluded on 29 June 2005 with the final at the Waldstadion, Frankfurt. It was the second and final stage of the 2005 FIFA Confederations Cup, following the group stage. The top two teams from each group (four teams in total) advanced to the knockout stage to compete in a single-elimination style tournament. A third-place match was included and played between the two losing teams of the semi-finals.

In the knockout stage (including the final), if a match was level at the end of 90 minutes, extra time of two periods (15 minutes each) would be played. If the score was still level after extra time, the match would be decided by a penalty shoot-out.

== Qualified teams ==
Group	Winners	Runners-up
A	Germany	Argentina
B	Mexico	Brazil

== Bracket ==
Semi-finals
25 June – Nuremberg
Germany	2
Brazil	3
26 June – Hanover
Mexico	1 (5)
Argentina (p)	1 (6)

Final
29 June – Frankfurt
Brazil	4
Argentina	1
Third place
29 June – Leipzig
Germany (a.e.t.)	4
Mexico	3

== Semi-finals ==
=== Germany v Brazil ===
25 June 2005
18:00

Germany	2–3	Brazil
Podolski 23'; Ballack 45+3' (pen.)	Report	Adriano 21', 76'; Ronaldinho 43' (pen.)

Frankenstadion, Nuremberg
Attendance: 42,187
Referee: Carlos Chandía (Chile)

Germany	Brazil

GK	12	Jens Lehmann
RB	3	Arne Friedrich
CB	4	Robert Huth
CB	17	Per Mertesacker
LB	19	Bernd Schneider
CM	13	Michael Ballack (c)
CM	8	Torsten Frings
CM	15	Fabian Ernst	(yellow card) 86'	(substituted off) 87'
RF	10	Sebastian Deisler	(yellow card) 25'	(substituted off) 83'
CF	22	Kevin Kurányi		(substituted off) 63'
LF	20	Lukas Podolski
Substitutions:
FW	14	Gerald Asamoah		(substituted on) 63'
FW	9	Mike Hanke		(substituted on) 83'
MF	18	Tim Borowski		(substituted on) 87'
Manager:
Jürgen Klinsmann

GK	1	Dida
RB	2	Maicon		(substituted off) 46'
CB	3	Lúcio
CB	4	Roque Júnior	(yellow card) 13'
LB	6	Gilberto
DM	5	Emerson	(yellow card) 66'
RM	8	Kaká		(substituted off) 78'
CM	10	Ronaldinho (c)
LM	11	Zé Roberto
CF	9	Adriano	(yellow card) 72'
CF	7	Robinho		(substituted off) 87'
Substitutions:
DF	13	Cicinho	(yellow card) 46'	(substituted on) 46'
MF	19	Renato		(substituted on) 78'
MF	20	Júlio Baptista		(substituted on) 87'
Manager:
Carlos Alberto Parreira

Man of the Match:
Adriano (Brazil)

Assistant referees:
Cristian Julio (Chile)
Mario Vargas (Chile)
Fourth official:
Peter Prendergast (Jamaica)

=== Mexico v Argentina ===
Mexico vs Argentina took place on 26 June 2005 at the AWD-Arena in Hanover. Both sides had chances to convert during normal time, with Mexico having the most ball possession and chances during the first half. The first chance arrived for Mexico in the third minute, with defensive midfielder Rafael Márquez having a chance from a corner caused by central midfielder Jaime Lozano, which went wide. A few minutes later, fellow central midfielder and captain Pável Pardo had another opportunity, a direct shot from the corner to force Argentine goalkeeper Germán Lux into making a save. During the end of the first half, Argentina also started producing chances, such as central forward Luciano Figueroa missing out on a cross by central midfielder Juan Román Riquelme, as well as Riquelme himself having his shot over inside the goal, and Javier Saviola assisting Juan Pablo Sorín after getting past the Mexican defence, with Sorín nearly gifting Argentina and the match its opening goal, having attempted to chip past Mexican goalkeeper Oswaldo Sánchez, before centre-back Gonzalo Pineda narrowly rescued off the line. During the second half, it was Argentina who started to find their form, with Argentina rounding up chances, all in four minutes. However, Mexico eventually managed to find their form, such as Zinha firing a shot, which hit the right post. During the near conclusion of the second half, both Saviola and Márquez were sent off, with Saviola kicking Pineda and Márquez for a tackle on replacement midfielder Pablo Aimar, which affected both sides' chances of progressing to the final. The match had to be decided in extra time. The first goal of the match came for Mexico in the 104th minute, with left-back Carlos Salcido scoring after the ball had hit centre-back Fabricio Coloccini. However, six minutes later, Argentina equalised through centre-forward Luciano Figueroa, in which he rounded Sánchez. No further goals were scored, and the match had to be decided by a penalty shoot-out. Argentina scored all of their six penalties, with right-back Ricardo Osorio missing his spot kick after it was saved by Lux. This meant Argentina won the match and advanced to the final, with Mexico qualifying for the third-place play-off. The penalty shoot-out was the first ever held in the FIFA Confederations Cup history.

26 June 2005
18:00

Mexico	1–1 (a.e.t.)	Argentina
Salcido 104'	Report	Figueroa 110'
Penalties
Pérez (penalty scored); Pardo (penalty scored); Borgetti (penalty scored); Salcido (penalty scored); Pineda (penalty scored); Osorio (penalty missed)	5–6	(penalty scored) Riquelme; (penalty scored) Rodríguez; (penalty scored) Aimar; (penalty scored) Galletti; (penalty scored) Sorín; (penalty scored) Cambiasso

AWD-Arena, Hanover
Attendance: 40,718
Referee: Roberto Rosetti (Italy)

Mexico	Argentina

GK	1	Oswaldo Sánchez
CB	5	Ricardo Osorio
CB	14	Gonzalo Pineda	(yellow card) 49'
CB	3	Carlos Salcido	(yellow card) 105'
DM	4	Rafael Márquez	(yellow card) 21' (yellow-red card) 90+3'
RM	16	Mario Méndez
CM	8	Pável Pardo (c)
CM	21	Jaime Lozano		(substituted off) 56'
LM	11	Ramón Morales		(substituted off) 72'
AM	7	Sinha		(substituted off) 90+4'
CF	9	Jared Borgetti
Substitutions:
MF	22	Luis Ernesto Pérez		(substituted on) 56'
FW	19	Alberto Medina	(yellow card) 102'	(substituted on) 72'
MF	6	Gerardo Torrado		(substituted on) 90+4'
Manager:
(Argentina) Ricardo La Volpe

GK	12	Germán Lux
RB	4	Javier Zanetti
CB	16	Fabricio Coloccini	(yellow card) 69'
CB	14	Gabriel Milito	(yellow card) 10'	(substituted off) 66'
LB	6	Gabriel Heinze
RM	18	Mario Santana		(substituted off) 76'
CM	8	Juan Román Riquelme
CM	5	Esteban Cambiasso
LM	3	Juan Pablo Sorín (c)
CF	21	Luciano Figueroa		(substituted off) 116'
CF	9	Javier Saviola	(red card) 90'
Substitutions:
FW	19	Maxi Rodríguez		(substituted on) 66'
MF	10	Pablo Aimar		(substituted on) 76'
FW	22	Luciano Galletti		(substituted on) 116'
Manager:
José Pékerman

Man of the Match:
Javier Zanetti (Argentina)

Assistant referees:
Alessandro Griselli (Italy)
Cristiano Copelli (Italy)
Fourth official:
Matthew Breeze (Australia)

== Third place play-off ==
29 June 2005
18:00

Germany	4–3 (a.e.t.)	Mexico
Podolski 37'; Schweinsteiger 41'; Huth 79'; Ballack 97'	Report	Fonseca 40'; Borgetti 58', 85'

Zentralstadion, Leipzig
Attendance: 43,335
Referee: Matthew Breeze (Australia)

Germany	Mexico

GK	1	Oliver Kahn
RB	2	Andreas Hinkel
CB	4	Robert Huth
CB	17	Per Mertesacker
LB	19	Bernd Schneider
RM	10	Sebastian Deisler		(substituted off) 67'
CM	8	Torsten Frings	(yellow card) 68'
CM	13	Michael Ballack (c)
LM	7	Bastian Schweinsteiger		(substituted off) 83'
CF	9	Mike Hanke	(red card) 54'
CF	20	Lukas Podolski		(substituted off) 74'
Substitutions:
FW	14	Gerald Asamoah	(yellow card) 88'	(substituted on) 67'
FW	22	Kevin Kurányi		(substituted on) 74'
MF	15	Fabian Ernst		(substituted on) 83'
Manager:
Jürgen Klinsmann

GK	1	Oswaldo Sánchez
CB	5	Ricardo Osorio	(yellow card) 90+6'
CB	14	Gonzalo Pineda
CB	3	Carlos Salcido
RM	16	Mario Méndez		(substituted off) 58'
CM	8	Pável Pardo (c)
CM	22	Luis Ernesto Pérez	(yellow card) 20'
LM	11	Ramón Morales		(substituted off) 81'
AM	7	Sinha
CF	9	Jared Borgetti
CF	17	Francisco Fonseca		(substituted off) 46'
Substitutions:
MF	20	Juan Pablo Rodríguez		(substituted on) 46'
FW	19	Alberto Medina		(substituted on) 58'
FW	13	Rafael Márquez Lugo		(substituted on) 81'
Manager:
(Argentina) Ricardo La Volpe

Man of the Match:
Michael Ballack (Germany)

Assistant referees:
Matthew Cream (Australia)
Jim Ouliaris (Australia)
Fourth official:
Carlos Chandía (Chile)

== Final ==
The final was held at Waldstadion, Frankfurt, on 29 June 2005. The match was contested by Brazil and Argentina. Both Brazil (after 1997 and 1999) and Argentina (after 1992 and 1995, then known as the King Fahd Cup) made their third performance in a Confederations Cup final. Brazil won their second Confederations Cup title.

29 June 2005
20:45

Brazil	4–1	Argentina
Adriano 11', 63'; Kaká 16'; Ronaldinho 47'	Report	Aimar 65'

Waldstadion, Frankfurt
Attendance: 45,591
Referee: Ľuboš Micheľ (Slovakia)

Brazil	Argentina

GK	1	Dida
RB	13	Cicinho		(substituted off) 86'
CB	3	Lúcio
CB	4	Roque Júnior
LB	6	Gilberto
DM	5	Emerson
CM	8	Kaká		(substituted off) 86'
CM	11	Zé Roberto
AM	10	Ronaldinho (c)	(yellow card) 28'
CF	9	Adriano
CF	7	Robinho		(substituted off) 90'
Substitutions:
DF	2	Maicon		(substituted on) 86'
MF	19	Renato		(substituted on) 86'
MF	18	Juninho		(substituted on) 90'
Manager:
Carlos Alberto Parreira

GK	12	Germán Lux
RB	4	Javier Zanetti
CB	16	Fabricio Coloccini	(yellow card) 28'
CB	6	Gabriel Heinze
LB	15	Diego Placente
CM	5	Esteban Cambiasso	(yellow card) 42'	(substituted off) 56'
CM	17	Lucas Bernardi
RW	11	César Delgado		(substituted off) 81'
AM	8	Juan Román Riquelme
LW	3	Juan Pablo Sorín (c)	(yellow card) 35'
CF	21	Luciano Figueroa		(substituted off) 72'
Substitutions:
MF	10	Pablo Aimar	(yellow card) 73'	(substituted on) 56'
FW	7	Carlos Tevez		(substituted on) 72'
FW	22	Luciano Galletti		(substituted on) 81'
Manager:
José Pékerman

Man of the Match:
Ronaldinho (Brazil)

Assistant referees:
Roman Slyško (Slovakia)
Martin Balko (Slovakia)
Fourth official:
Peter Prendergast (Jamaica)
