= 2005 FIFA Confederations Cup Group B =

Football tournament group stage

Group B of the 2005 FIFA Confederations Cup took place between 16 June and 22 June 2005. Mexico won the group, and advanced to the second round, along with Brazil. Japan and Greece failed to advance.

== Standings ==
Pos	Team	Pld	W	D	L	GF	GA	GD	Pts	Qualification
1	Mexico	3	2	1	0	3	1	+2	7	Advance to knockout stage
2	Brazil	3	1	1	1	5	3	+2	4	Advance to knockout stage
3	Japan	3	1	1	1	4	4	0	4	
4	Greece	3	0	1	2	0	4	−4	1	

== Matches ==
=== Japan v Mexico ===
16 June 2005
18:00

Japan	1–2	Mexico
Yanagisawa 12'	Report	Sinha 39'; Fonseca 64'

Stadium Hanover, Hanover
Attendance: 24,036
Referee: Matthew Breeze (Australia)

Japan	Mexico

GK	23	Yoshikatsu Kawaguchi
CB	2	Makoto Tanaka
CB	5	Tsuneyasu Miyamoto (c)
CB	3	Takayuki Chano		(substituted off) 82'
RM	21	Akira Kaji	(yellow card) 90+2'
CM	7	Hidetoshi Nakata
CM	15	Takashi Fukunishi
LM	14	Alex
AM	10	Shunsuke Nakamura		(substituted off) 59'
AM	8	Mitsuo Ogasawara		(substituted off) 68'
CF	13	Atsushi Yanagisawa
Substitutions:
MF	18	Junichi Inamoto		(substituted on) 59'
FW	16	Masashi Oguro		(substituted on) 68'
FW	9	Keiji Tamada		(substituted on) 82'
Manager:
(Brazil) Zico

GK	1	Oswaldo Sánchez
CB	5	Ricardo Osorio
CB	2	Aarón Galindo
CB	3	Carlos Salcido
RM	18	Salvador Carmona
CM	6	Gerardo Torrado	(substituted off) 46'
CM	8	Pável Pardo (c)
LM	21	Jaime Lozano	(substituted off) 46'
AM	17	Francisco Fonseca	(substituted off) 86'
AM	7	Sinha
CF	9	Jared Borgetti
Substitutions:
MF	14	Gonzalo Pineda	(substituted on) 46'
MF	22	Luis Ernesto Pérez	(substituted on) 46'
MF	20	Juan Pablo Rodríguez	(substituted on) 86'
Manager:
(Argentina) Ricardo La Volpe

Man of the Match:
Sinha (Mexico)

Assistant referees:
Matthew Cream (Australia)
Jim Ouliaris (Australia)
Fourth official:
Carlos Chandía (Chile)

=== Brazil v Greece ===
16 June 2005
20:45

Brazil	3–0	Greece
Adriano 41'; Robinho 46'; Juninho 81'	Report

Zentralstadion, Leipzig
Attendance: 42,507
Referee: Ľuboš Micheľ (Slovakia)

Brazil	Greece

GK	1	Dida
RB	13	Cicinho
CB	3	Lúcio
CB	4	Roque Júnior (c)
LB	6	Gilberto	(yellow card) 84'
CM	5	Emerson
CM	11	Zé Roberto
LM	10	Ronaldinho		(substituted off) 71'
RW	8	Kaká		(substituted off) 77'
CF	7	Robinho
CF	9	Adriano		(substituted off) 71'
Substitutions:
FW	21	Ricardo Oliveira		(substituted on) 71'
MF	19	Renato		(substituted on) 71'
MF	18	Juninho Pernambucano		(substituted on) 77'
Manager:
Carlos Alberto Parreira

GK	1	Antonios Nikopolidis
RB	2	Giourkas Seitaridis		(substituted off) 46'
CB	5	Sotirios Kyrgiakos	(yellow card) 80'
CB	18	Giannis Goumas
LB	6	Angelos Basinas
RM	20	Giorgos Karagounis	(yellow card) 32'
CM	7	Theodoros Zagorakis (c)		(substituted off) 73'
CM	21	Kostas Katsouranis
LM	8	Stelios Giannakopoulos
CF	9	Angelos Charisteas
CF	15	Zisis Vryzas		(substituted off) 46'
Substitutions:
DF	3	Loukas Vyntra		(substituted on) 46'
FW	11	Dimitrios Papadopoulos		(substituted on) 46'
FW	17	Ioannis Amanatidis		(substituted on) 73'
Manager:
(Germany) Otto Rehhagel

Man of the Match:
Robinho (Brazil)

Assistant referees:
Roman Slyško (Slovakia)
Martin Balko (Slovakia)
Fourth official:
Shamsul Maidin (Singapore)

=== Greece v Japan ===
19 June 2005
18:00

Greece	0–1	Japan
	Report	Oguro 76'

Waldstadion, Frankfurt
Attendance: 34,314
Referee: Herbert Fandel (Germany)

Greece	Japan

GK	1	Antonios Nikopolidis
CB	4	Stathis Tavlaridis		(substituted off) 31'
CB	6	Angelos Basinas
CB	5	Sotirios Kyrgiakos
RM	23	Vasilios Lakis		(substituted off) 59'
CM	21	Kostas Katsouranis
CM	20	Giorgos Karagounis	(yellow card) 54'
LM	14	Takis Fyssas
RW	9	Angelos Charisteas
LW	8	Stelios Giannakopoulos
CF	15	Zisis Vryzas (c)		(substituted off) 46'
Substitutions:
MF	10	Vasilios Tsiartas		(substituted on) 31'
FW	22	Theofanis Gekas		(substituted on) 46'
FW	11	Dimitrios Papadopoulos		(substituted on) 59'
Manager:
(Germany) Otto Rehhagel

GK	23	Yoshikatsu Kawaguchi
RB	21	Akira Kaji
CB	2	Makoto Tanaka
CB	5	Tsuneyasu Miyamoto (c)
LB	14	Alex	(yellow card) 83'
RM	10	Shunsuke Nakamura		(substituted off) 89'
CM	7	Hidetoshi Nakata
CM	15	Takashi Fukunishi
LM	8	Mitsuo Ogasawara		(substituted off) 74'
CF	9	Keiji Tamada		(substituted off) 66'
CF	13	Atsushi Yanagisawa
Substitutions:
FW	16	Masashi Oguro		(substituted on) 66'
MF	4	Yasuhito Endō		(substituted on) 74'
MF	6	Kōji Nakata		(substituted on) 89'
Manager:
(Brazil) Zico

Man of the Match:
Shunsuke Nakamura (Japan)

Assistant referees:
Carsten Kadach (Germany)
Volker Wezel (Germany)
Fourth official:
Carlos Amarilla (Paraguay)

=== Mexico v Brazil ===
19 June 2005
20:45

Mexico	1–0	Brazil
Borgetti 59'	Report

Stadium Hanover, Hanover
Attendance: 43,677
Referee: Roberto Rosetti (Italy)

Mexico	Brazil

GK	1	Oswaldo Sánchez	(yellow card) 80'
RB	18	Salvador Carmona
CB	5	Ricardo Osorio
CB	2	Aarón Galindo
LB	3	Carlos Salcido
RM	11	Ramón Morales		(substituted off) 73'
CM	7	Sinha
CM	8	Pável Pardo (c)
LM	14	Gonzalo Pineda	(yellow card) 51'	(substituted off) 69'
CF	17	Francisco Fonseca		(substituted off) 46'
CF	9	Jared Borgetti
Substitutions:
MF	22	Luis Ernesto Pérez		(substituted on) 46'
DF	16	Mario Méndez		(substituted on) 69'
FW	19	Alberto Medina		(substituted on) 73'
Manager:
(Argentina) Ricardo La Volpe

GK	1	Dida
RB	13	Cicinho
CB	3	Lúcio
CB	4	Roque Júnior (c)	(yellow card) 29'
LB	6	Gilberto
RM	8	Kaká		(substituted off) 76'
CM	5	Emerson		(substituted off) 66'
CM	11	Zé Roberto
LM	10	Ronaldinho
CF	9	Adriano
CF	7	Robinho		(substituted off) 66'
Substitutions:
FW	21	Ricardo Oliveira		(substituted on) 66'
MF	19	Renato		(substituted on) 66'
MF	18	Juninho Pernambucano		(substituted on) 76'
Manager:
Carlos Alberto Parreira

Man of the Match:
Oswaldo Sánchez (Mexico)

Assistant referees:
Alessandro Griselli (Italy)
Cristiano Copelli (Italy)
Fourth official:
Carlos Chandía (Chile)

=== Greece v Mexico ===
22 June 2005
20:45

Greece	0–0	Mexico
	Report

Waldstadion, Frankfurt
Attendance: 31,285
Referee: Carlos Amarilla (Paraguay)

Greece	Mexico

GK	1	Antonios Nikopolidis
RB	3	Loukas Vyntra
CB	19	Michalis Kapsis		(substituted off) 74'
CB	18	Giannis Goumas
LB	14	Takis Fyssas
RM	17	Ioannis Amanatidis	(yellow card) 8'	(substituted off) 46'
CM	7	Theodoros Zagorakis (c)
CM	6	Angelos Basinas
LM	8	Stelios Giannakopoulos
CF	9	Angelos Charisteas
CF	15	Zisis Vryzas		(substituted off) 61'
Substitutions:
FW	22	Theofanis Gekas		(substituted on) 46'
FW	11	Dimitrios Papadopoulos		(substituted on) 61'
DF	4	Stathis Tavlaridis	(yellow card) 85'	(substituted on) 74'
Manager:
(Germany) Otto Rehhagel

GK	1	Oswaldo Sánchez
RB	16	Mario Méndez
CB	5	Ricardo Osorio
CB	14	Gonzalo Pineda
LB	3	Carlos Salcido
RM	11	Ramón Morales
CM	8	Pável Pardo (c)	(yellow card) 39'	(substituted off) 46'
CM	20	Juan Pablo Rodríguez	(yellow card) 47'
LM	21	Jaime Lozano		(substituted off) 73'
SS	22	Luis Ernesto Pérez
CF	17	Francisco Fonseca		(substituted off) 61'
Substitutions:
FW	19	Alberto Medina		(substituted on) 46'
MF	6	Gerardo Torrado		(substituted on) 61'
DF	4	Rafael Márquez		(substituted on) 73'
Manager:
(Argentina) Ricardo La Volpe

Man of the Match:
Oswaldo Sánchez (Mexico)

Assistant referees:
Amelio Andino (Paraguay)
Manuel Bernal (Paraguay)
Fourth official:
Manuel Mejuto González (Spain)

=== Japan v Brazil ===
22 June 2005
20:45

Japan	2–2	Brazil
Nakamura 27'; Oguro 88'	Report	Robinho 10'; Ronaldinho 32'

RheinEnergieStadion, Cologne
Attendance: 44,922
Referee: Mourad Daami (Tunisia)

Japan	Brazil

GK	23	Yoshikatsu Kawaguchi
RB	21	Akira Kaji	(yellow card) 55'
CB	5	Tsuneyasu Miyamoto (c)
CB	2	Makoto Tanaka
LB	14	Alex	(yellow card) 28'
DM	15	Takashi Fukunishi
RM	8	Mitsuo Ogasawara		(substituted off) 46'
CM	7	Hidetoshi Nakata
LM	10	Shunsuke Nakamura
SS	13	Atsushi Yanagisawa		(substituted off) 73'
CF	9	Keiji Tamada		(substituted off) 46'
Substitutions:
MF	6	Kōji Nakata	(yellow card) 35'	(substituted on) 46'
FW	16	Masashi Oguro		(substituted on) 46'
FW	11	Takayuki Suzuki		(substituted on) 73'
Manager:
(Brazil) Zico

GK	12	Marcos
RB	13	Cicinho	(yellow card) 56'
CB	3	Lúcio
CB	14	Juan
LB	16	Léo
DM	17	Gilberto Silva
RM	8	Kaká		(substituted off) 62'
CM	10	Ronaldinho (c)
LM	11	Zé Roberto	(yellow card) 66'	(substituted off) 78'
SS	7	Robinho
CF	9	Adriano		(substituted off) 62'
Substitutions:
MF	19	Renato		(substituted on) 62'
MF	20	Júlio Baptista		(substituted on) 62'
MF	22	Edu		(substituted on) 78'
Manager:
Carlos Alberto Parreira

Man of the Match:
Shunsuke Nakamura (Japan)

Assistant referees:
Taoufik Adjengui (Tunisia)
Ali Tomusange (Uganda)
Fourth official:
Shamsul Maidin (Singapore)
