= 2005 FIFA Confederations Cup final =

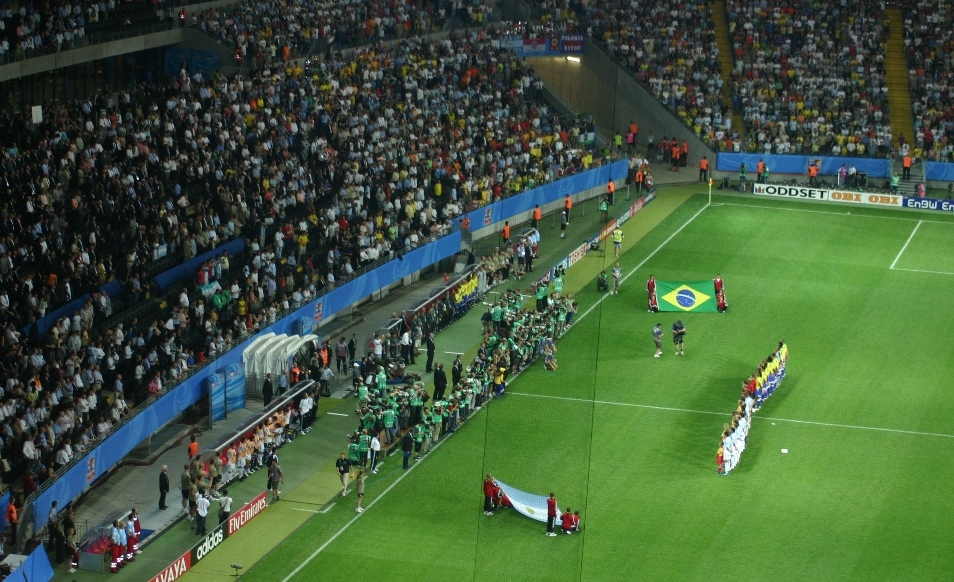
- Event: 2005 FIFA Confederations Cup
Brazil	Argentina
(Brazil)	(Argentina)
4	1
- Date: 29 June 2005
- Venue: Waldstadion, Frankfurt
- Man of the Match: Ronaldinho (Brazil)
- Referee: Ľuboš Micheľ (Slovakia)
- Attendance: 45,591

The 2005 FIFA Confederations Cup final was a football match to determine the winners of the 2005 FIFA Confederations Cup. The match was held at Waldstadion, Frankfurt, Germany, on 29 June 2005 and was contested by Brazil and Argentina, who just met the previous year at the Copa América final. Brazil won the match 4–1.

== Route to the final ==
Brazil		Round	Argentina	
Opponent	Result	Group stage	Opponent	Result
Greece	3–0	Matchday 1	Tunisia	2–1
Mexico	0–1	Matchday 2	Australia	4–2
Japan	2–2	Matchday 3	Germany	2–2
Group B runners-up: Pos / Team / Pld / W / D / L / GF / GA / GD / Pts / Qualification; 1 / Mexico / 3 / 2 / 1 / 0 / 3 / 1 / +2 / 7 / Advance to knockout stage; 2 / Brazil / 3 / 1 / 1 / 1 / 5 / 3 / +2 / 4 / Advance to knockout stage; 3 / Japan / 3 / 1 / 1 / 1 / 4 / 4 / 0 / 4; 4 / Greece / 3 / 0 / 1 / 2 / 0 / 4 / −4 / 1; Source:		Final standings	Group A runners-up: Pos / Team / Pld / W / D / L / GF / GA / GD / Pts / Qualification; 1 / Germany (H) / 3 / 2 / 1 / 0 / 9 / 5 / +4 / 7 / Advance to knockout stage; 2 / Argentina / 3 / 2 / 1 / 0 / 8 / 5 / +3 / 7 / Advance to knockout stage; 3 / Tunisia / 3 / 1 / 0 / 2 / 3 / 5 / −2 / 3; 4 / Australia / 3 / 0 / 0 / 3 / 5 / 10 / −5 / 0; Source: (H) Hosts	
Opponent	Result	Knockout stage	Opponent	Result
Germany	3–2	Semi-finals	Mexico	1–1 (6–5 p)

== Match details ==
29 June 2005
20:45 CEST

Brazil	4–1	Argentina
Adriano 11', 63'; Kaká 16'; Ronaldinho 47'	Report	Aimar 65'

Waldstadion, Frankfurt
Attendance: 45,591
Referee: Ľuboš Micheľ (Slovakia)

Brazil	Argentina

GK	1	Dida
RB	13	Cicinho		(substituted off) 86'
CB	3	Lúcio
CB	4	Roque Júnior
LB	6	Gilberto
DM	5	Emerson
CM	8	Kaká		(substituted off) 86'
CM	11	Zé Roberto
AM	10	Ronaldinho (c)	(yellow card) 28'
CF	9	Adriano
CF	7	Robinho		(substituted off) 90'
Substitutions:
DF	2	Maicon		(substituted on) 86'
MF	19	Renato		(substituted on) 86'
MF	18	Juninho		(substituted on) 90'
Manager:
Carlos Alberto Parreira

GK	12	Germán Lux
RB	4	Javier Zanetti
CB	16	Fabricio Coloccini	(yellow card) 28'
CB	6	Gabriel Heinze
LB	15	Diego Placente
CM	5	Esteban Cambiasso	(yellow card) 42'	(substituted off) 56'
CM	17	Lucas Bernardi
RW	11	César Delgado		(substituted off) 81'
AM	8	Juan Román Riquelme
LW	3	Juan Pablo Sorín (c)	(yellow card) 35'
CF	21	Luciano Figueroa		(substituted off) 72'
Substitutions:
MF	10	Pablo Aimar	(yellow card) 73'	(substituted on) 56'
FW	7	Carlos Tevez		(substituted on) 72'
FW	22	Luciano Galletti		(substituted on) 81'
Manager:
José Pékerman

Man of the Match:
Ronaldinho (Brazil)

Assistant referees:
Roman Slyško (Slovakia)
Martin Balko (Slovakia)
Fourth official:
Peter Prendergast (Jamaica)

== See also ==
- Argentina–Brazil football rivalry
