= Adidas Pelias =

2004 FIFA official ball in Europe

The Adidas Pelias (/ˈpiːliæs/ PEE-lee-ass, Greek: [peˈli.as]) was the official ball for all FIFA events in Europe in 2004. It has since been effectively replaced by the Pelias 2, which was used as the official ball for all FIFA events in Europe in 2005, including the 2005 FIFA Confederations Cup and the 2005 FIFA U-20 World Cup. It was first used in the football events of the 2004 Summer Olympics.

== Ball ==
The ball is made by Adidas, and was made using the same materials and construction as the Adidas Roteiro, the official match ball of the UEFA European Football Championship in 2004.

The panels of the ball were thermally bonded and makes use of Adidas' Power Balance Technology. Both the Pelias and the Pelias 2 have attained the FIFA Approved rating.

== Design ==
The original Pelias and the new Pelias 2 make use of the same basic design, with the differences mainly lying in the colour and thickness of the lines on the panels. Each section of the design is based around a repeated Hexagon and 3 Pentagon pattern.
