= Robert Huth =

German footballer (born 1984)

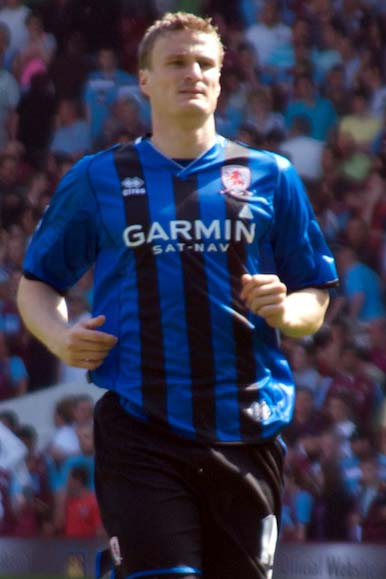
- Huth playing for Middlesbrough in 2009

Personal information
- Full name: Robert Huth
- Date of birth: 18 August 1984 (age 42)
- Place of birth: Biesdorf, East Berlin, East Germany
- Height: 1.91 m (6 ft 3 in)
- Position: Centre-back

Youth career
- 1999–2000: VfB Fortuna Biesdorf
- 2000–2001: Union Berlin
- 2001–2002: Chelsea

Senior career*
Years	Team	Apps	(Gls)
2002–2006	Chelsea	42	(0)
2006–2009	Middlesbrough	53	(2)
2009–2015	Stoke City	149	(13)
2015	→ Leicester City (loan)	14	(1)
2015–2019	Leicester City	68	(5)
Total		326	(21)

International career
2003	Germany U20		
2004–2005	Germany U21	4	(0)
2004–2009	Germany	19	(2)
- * Club domestic league appearances and goals

Robert Huth (/ˈhuːθ/, German: [ˈʁoːbɛʁt ˈhuːt]; born 18 August 1984) is a German former professional footballer who played as a centre-back. He is a three-time Premier League winner (twice with Chelsea and once with Leicester City) and has made the most Premier League appearances (322) by a German player.

Huth was signed for Chelsea from the youth system of German club 1. FC Union Berlin in 2001 by Claudio Ranieri. He struggled to establish himself in the Chelsea first team and with the likes of John Terry, William Gallas and Ricardo Carvalho ahead of him in the pecking order at Stamford Bridge, he joined Middlesbrough in August 2006 for a fee of £6 million. He spent three years at the Riverside and after the club was relegated in 2009, Huth signed for Stoke City for a then-club record fee of £5 million.

After a successful 2010–11 season for Huth which saw him play in the FA Cup final, he was named as Stoke's Player of the Year. Under the management of Tony Pulis, Huth remained a vital member of the Stoke squad in 2011–12 and 2012–13. He also played regularly under Mark Hughes in 2013–14 before he suffered a knee injury which ruled him out nearly a year. He was unable to force his way back into the team and he joined Leicester on loan in February 2015, helping them avoid relegation from the top flight. Huth then joined Leicester permanently, helping them to win the Premier League title in 2016.

Huth was also a Germany international, earning 19 caps and scoring two goals between 2004 and 2009. He was part of the Germany squads which came third at the 2005 FIFA Confederations Cup and the 2006 FIFA World Cup, both on home soil.

== Club career ==
=== Chelsea ===
Huth was born in Biesdorf, East Berlin, and played for local side VfB Fortuna Biesdorf and then the youth teams at 1. FC Union Berlin before joining English side Chelsea in 2001. Huth made his debut for Chelsea at the age of 17 in the last game of the 2001–02 season, coming on as a substitute at half-time for Jesper Grønkjær in a 1–3 home defeat against Aston Villa. In August 2003, Reading tried to sign Huth on loan for the 2003–04 season, but their bid was rejected by Chelsea. He made 20 appearances during that season, stating he was happy to stay at Chelsea. In the 2004–05 season, injuries restricted him to 15 appearances for the Blues.

When the 2005–06 season started, Huth's chances of becoming a first-choice player at Chelsea in the near future seemed limited with John Terry, William Gallas and Ricardo Carvalho ahead of him in the Chelsea squad. These were the preferred central defenders for Chelsea manager José Mourinho, who had succeeded Ranieri in the summer of 2004. Huth scored twice for Chelsea, with one against MŠK Žilina in a Champions League qualifier and the other against Birmingham City in the FA Cup. At the end of the 2005–06 season, Huth stated that he was unhappy with his lack of first team chances, prompting Middlesbrough, Wigan Athletic and Everton to submit bids for his services. He stated that he would join Middlesbrough after the 2006 FIFA World Cup after agreeing a five-year deal.

=== Middlesbrough ===
On 13 July 2006, a proposed transfer to Middlesbrough was scuppered when Huth failed a medical. Middlesbrough continued to track Huth, and on 31 August he signed for the club for a fee of £6 million on a five-year contract. Huth had a tough start to his career at Middlesbrough as they lost 1–0 to Notts County in the League Cup. Manager Gareth Southgate stated that Huth was lacking in match fitness and decided to play him in a number of reserve matches. By mid-October, Huth had regained his fitness and played his first league match for Boro against Everton, which they won 2–1. He scored his first Boro goal in a 2–1 defeat at Tottenham Hotspur on 5 December 2006. Huth's progress in a Middlesbrough shirt, however, was halted when he picked up a foot injury in a training session. Scans later revealed that he had suffered a stress fracture and was out for six weeks. He made his return as a substitute in an FA Cup tie against Manchester United on 19 March 2007, but shortly afterwards he again picked up an injury in a 3–1 defeat against Aston Villa.

Huth underwent ankle surgery in the summer of 2007 in order to fix his problem; he consulted a specialist after failing to recover. Huth returned to training in November 2007 and made his comeback against Reading on 1 December. After the departure of Jonathan Woodgate to Tottenham, Huth was paired in central defence with David Wheater. On 3 February, Huth scored against Newcastle United to earn a point against Kevin Keegan's team. He again struggled with injuries and missed the last two months of the 2007–08 season.

Huth recovered well and made a strong start to the 2008–09 season. However, he again suffered an ankle injury. He returned to the side in December time and by February the team had been enduring a tough season and were in deep relegation trouble. Boro failed to improve and they suffered relegation to the Championship, losing 2–1 to West Ham United on the final day of the season. He played five league matches for Boro at the start of the 2009–10 season before he returned to the Premier League with Stoke City.

=== Stoke City ===
On 27 August 2009, Huth signed a four-year contract with Stoke City for £5 million. He made his Stoke debut in a 1–0 win over Sunderland on 29 August 2009, replacing goalscorer Dave Kitson. He celebrated his 100th Premier League appearance by scoring his first Stoke goal on 4 October 2009, against Everton. On 17 October, Huth punched Matthew Upson in the face during a match against West Ham, though he received no card from the referee. Huth was later charged by the FA for the incident. He admitted his guilt the following day, and apologised for the incident. Huth was subsequently suspended for three matches by the FA. Huth scored a 90th-minute equaliser against Liverpool on 16 January 2010. He then scored his third Stoke goal in a 2–1 win over Portsmouth. He was given the captain's armband for Stoke's 2009–10 FA Cup quarter-final tie at former club Chelsea, which he described as a proud moment for himself.

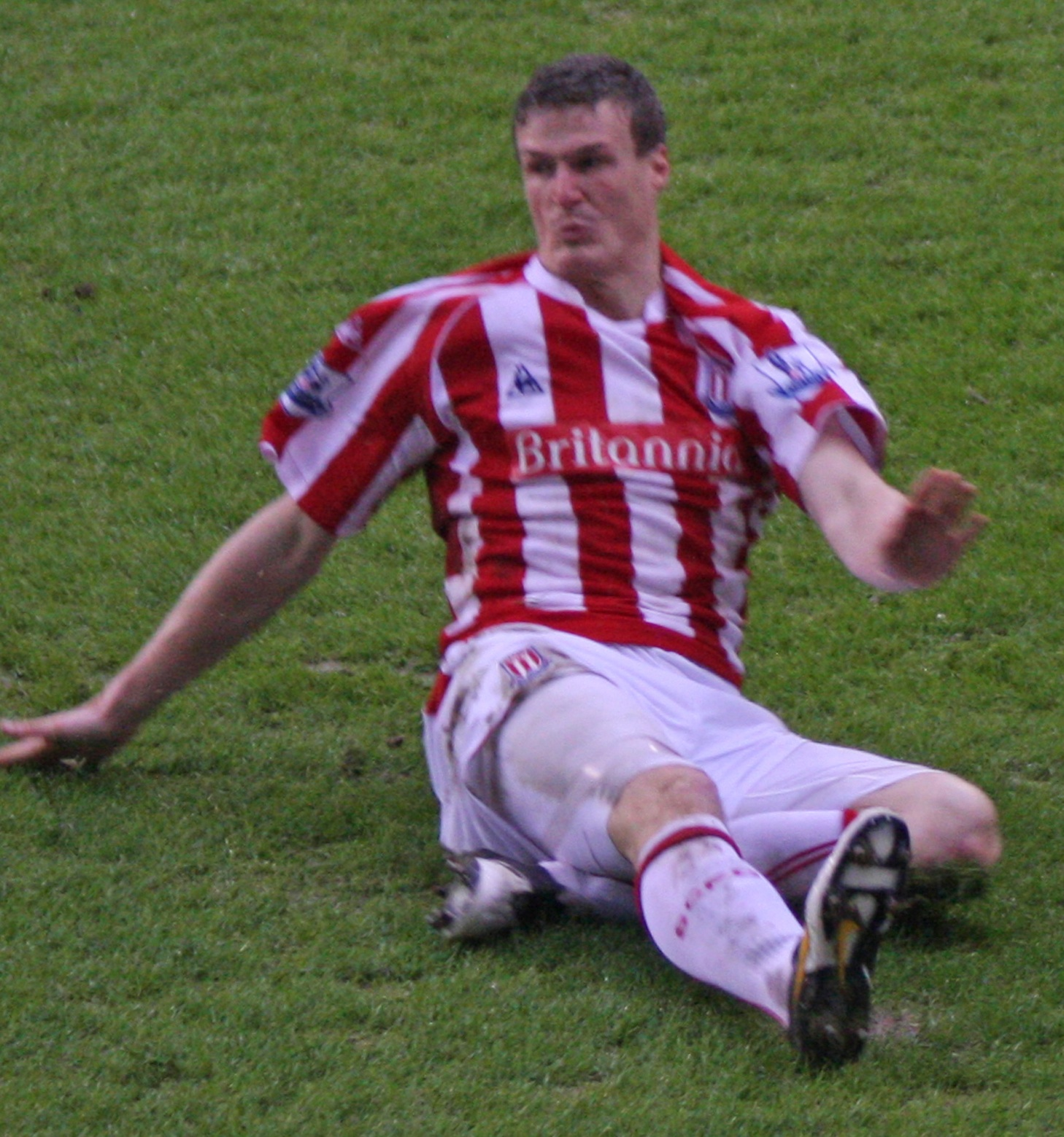
Huth in action for Stoke during the 2009–10 season

Huth opened his account for the 2010–11 season with a 93rd-minute winner against Aston Villa to help Stoke record their first win of the season. He followed this up with goals against Birmingham City, Wigan, Blackburn Rovers, Wolverhampton Wanderers and two against Sunderland. He also scored in the FA Cup quarter-final against West Ham, helping Stoke to reach the semi-final stage. last done 1972. He scored in the 5–0 FA Cup Semi-final victory against Bolton Wanderers, becoming the first Stoke defender to score nine goals in a season. He then played in the FA Cup final against Manchester City as Stoke lost 1–0. After a successful season for Huth, he was named Stoke's Player of the Year.

In the summer of 2011, manager Tony Pulis signed former England international centre backs Jonathan Woodgate and Matthew Upson, forcing Huth into playing in the unfamiliar right back position. After a series of poor defensive performances by Stoke, however, Huth returned to his centre-back pairing with Ryan Shawcross, going on to score his first goal of the season against Everton. In a match against Sunderland, Huth was sent-off for tackling David Meyler, although replays showed that he pulled out of the challenge. Sunderland took full advantage of the extra man and scored the only goal through James McClean. Stoke attempted to have Huth's red card overturned on appeal, but failed in their efforts. Huth scored twice towards the end of the season against Midlands opponents Wolves and Aston Villa respectively. His performances for the side prompted Pulis to open discussions with Huth over a new contract.

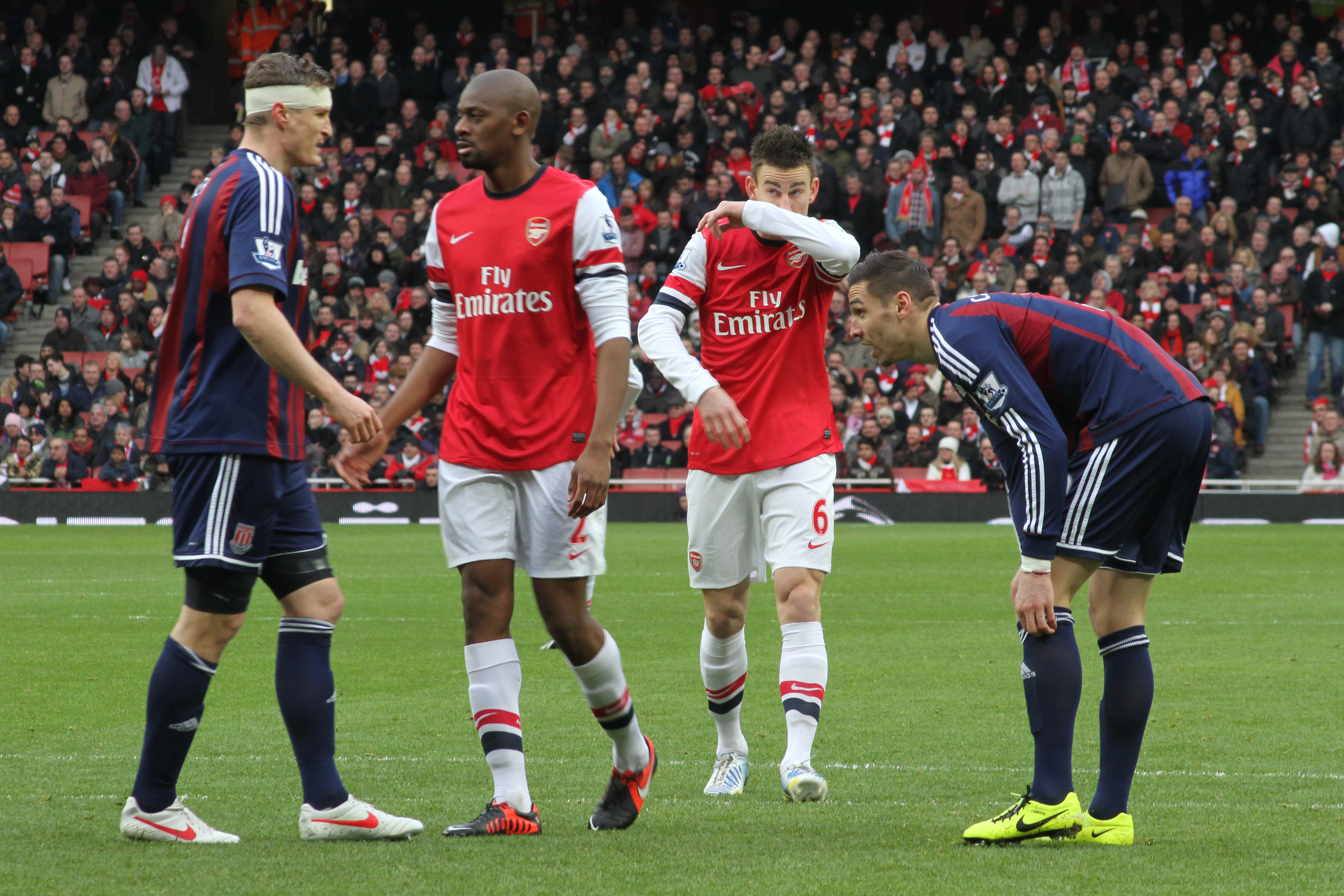
Huth and Geoff Cameron with Arsenal's Abou Diaby and Laurent Koscielny in February 2013

In June 2012, Huth signed a new three-year contract with Stoke, keeping him at the Britannia Stadium until 2016. Huth fell ill at the start of August with viral meningitis. He made a full recovery soon after and played against Reading on the opening day of the 2012–13 season. Afterwards, he explained that he caught the virus whilst in the United States on Stoke's pre-season tour. Huth scored his first goal of the season in a 2–1 victory against Reading on 9 February 2013. Huth was given a retrospective three-match ban after an off-the-ball altercation with Fulham's Philippe Senderos on 23 February 2013. He played 39 times for Stoke in 2012–13 as the side finished in 13th position; at the end of campaign, manager Tony Pulis was replaced by Mark Hughes. Under Hughes, Huth remained a regular in the side, but suffered a knee injury in November 2013 that required surgery. Despite trying to make a quick recovery, Huth required a second operation on his knee and missed the remainder of the 2013–14 season.

Huth returned from injury at the beginning of the 2014–15 season, playing in League Cup matches against Portsmouth and Sunderland. However, he then suffered another injury in training that ruled him out for a further two months. He played his first league game for over a year against Arsenal on 6 December 2014. Huth left Stoke in June 2015 after spending six seasons with the Potters, making 188 appearances and scoring 18 goals.

=== Leicester City ===
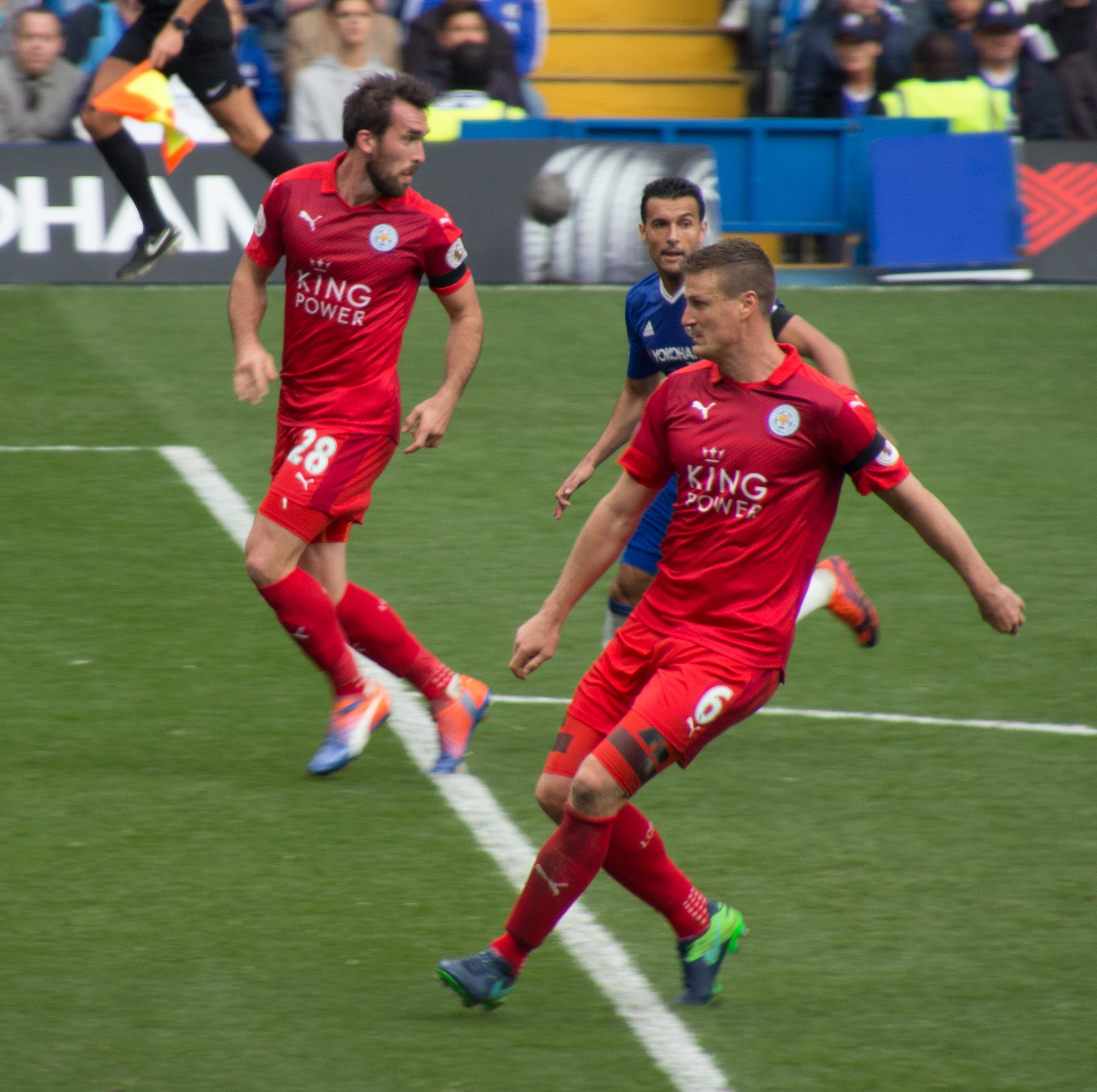
Christian Fuchs and Robert Huth playing for Leicester City in October 2016

On 2 February 2015, Huth joined Leicester City on loan until the end of the season. He made his debut eight days later, playing the entirety of a 2–1 defeat away at Arsenal. His first goal for the club came on 11 April 2015, heading an equaliser as they came from behind to win 3–2 away at West Bromwich Albion. Huth's arrival at Leicester saw the Foxes embark on a run of seven victories in their final nine fixtures, which saw them retain their Premier League status. Leicester manager Nigel Pearson admitted that he would like to sign Huth on a permanent basis.

Huth completed a permanent transfer to Leicester on 24 June 2015, signing a three-year contract for an undisclosed fee, reported to be £3 million. The following 13 January, he scored his first goal of the season for the title-chasing Foxes, heading in Christian Fuchs' corner for the only goal of the game at Tottenham. On 6 February, he scored twice in a 3–1 win at title rivals Manchester City, putting Leicester six points clear at the top of the table. Leicester won the title at 5,000–1 odds, and Huth became only the seventh player to win the Premier League with two different teams. He missed only three league games as a result of a retrospective three-match suspension by The FA for pulling Marouane Fellaini's hair during a 1–1 draw at Manchester United on 1 May 2016.

On 29 October 2016, Huth fouled Vincent Janssen in a 1–1 draw away at Tottenham Hotspur to concede his first penalty since January 2013. Huth remarked in an interview in November that he thought referees were getting penalty decisions wrong "a lot of the time" and felt he was being judged on "reputation". He admitted in a post-match interview on 2 January 2017 that his side were lucky not to concede a penalty when he brought down Adama Traoré in a goalless draw at Middlesbrough, a view not shared by Pat Nevin, watching the game for BBC Radio 5 live.

Huth missed the entire 2017–18 season due to ankle and foot injuries, eventually opting to leave the club in June 2018. He announced his retirement on 11 January 2019, following speculation that he was set to join Derby County. He appeared in 326 league matches on the first two levels in English football.

== Coaching career ==
After leaving Leicester in June 2018, Huth spent time back in Germany studying sporting directorship. Huth made a return to Leicester in October 2022 taking the position of loans manager taking over from Guy Branston.

== International career ==
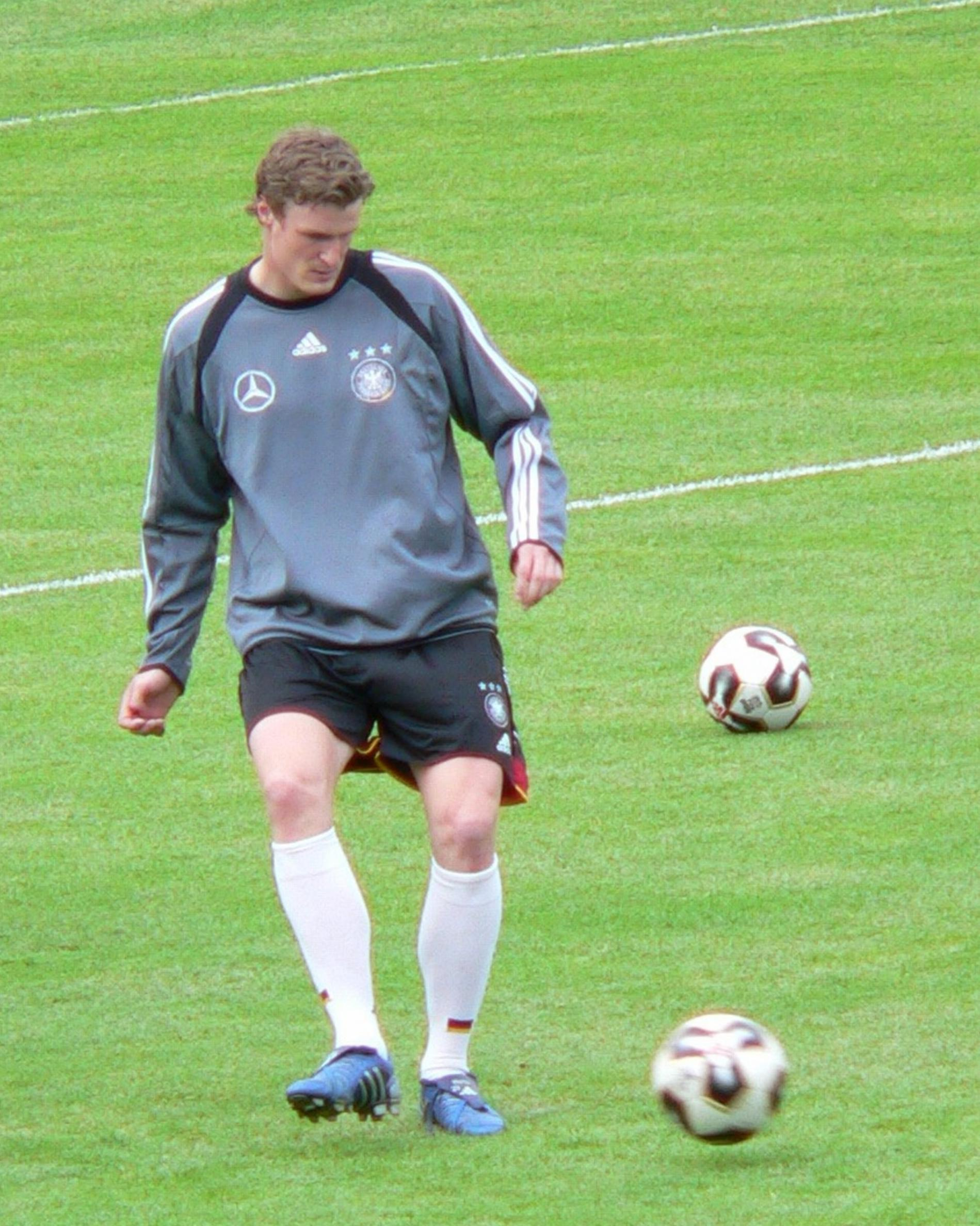
Huth training with Germany at the 2005 FIFA Confederations Cup

From a young age, Huth was already a member of the German national team. He also played at the 2003 FIFA World Youth Championship. Huth was called up on 16 August 2004 in the Germany national team, when he was nominated for the friendly match at the Ernst Happel Stadium in Vienna against Austria. Two days later, he appeared as a substitute in this friendly match in the 86th minute for Andreas Hinkel.

Together with a young Per Mertesacker, he was the first-choice central defender for Germany at the 2005 Confederations Cup. On 29 June, he scored his first goal for Germany in a 4–3 extra-time win against Mexico during the third-place play-off.

His second goal for Germany came in a 4–1 defeat to Italy in a friendly game played in Florence in March 2006. During the World Cup on home soil, Huth lost his place to Christoph Metzelder as Mertesacker's first-choice partner after being blamed for some defensive errors in several pre-tournament games and only started one game, the last group stage match against Ecuador.

He was recalled to the Germany national team, last done for the 2006 World Cup, for a friendly against Switzerland on 20 March 2008 owing to his impressive recent club form. He was later ruled out after suffering from a foot injury. He totalled only 19 games and two goals for Germany, ending his international career very early.

Huth is the only ever Germany International that never played a game in the German Bundesliga.

== Personal life ==
Growing up in Berlin, Huth decided to support Werder Bremen, as local Hertha BSC were rarely on TV. He was a ball boy at the 1997 DFB-Pokal Final at his city's Olympic Stadium.

In January 2015, the FA began an investigation into Huth after he took part in a game on Twitter in which users guessed the gender of people in sexually explicit photos. He deleted his interactions with the game and apologised. Later that month, he was fined £15,000 and banned for two matches by the FA for the interactions, which were deemed "an aggravated breach."

== Career statistics ==
=== Club ===
Appearances and goals by club, season and competition
Club	Season	League			FA Cup		League Cup		Europe		Other		Total	
Club	Season	Division	Apps	Goals	Apps	Goals	Apps	Goals	Apps	Goals	Apps	Goals	Apps	Goals
Chelsea	2001–02	Premier League	1	0	0	0	0	0	0	0	—		1	0
Chelsea	2002–03	Premier League	2	0	1	0	0	0	2 (Note: Appearances in UEFA Cup)	0	—		5	0
Chelsea	2003–04	Premier League	16	0	1	0	1	0	2 (Note: Appearances in UEFA Champions League)	1	—		20	1
Chelsea	2004–05	Premier League	9	0	1	1	0	0	4	0	—		15	1
Chelsea	2005–06	Premier League	13	0	4	0	1	0	3	0	—		21	0
Chelsea	Total		42	0	7	1	2	0	11	1	0	0	62	2
Middlesbrough	2006–07	Premier League	12	1	1	0	1	0	—		—		14	1
Middlesbrough	2007–08	Premier League	13	1	3	0	0	0	—		—		16	1
Middlesbrough	2008–09	Premier League	24	0	4	0	0	0	—		—		28	0
Middlesbrough	2009–10	Championship	4	0	0	0	1	0	—		—		5	0
Middlesbrough	Total		53	2	8	0	2	0	0	0	0	0	63	2
Stoke City	2009–10	Premier League	32	3	5	0	0	0	—		—		37	3
Stoke City	2010–11	Premier League	35	6	6	3	3	0	—		—		44	9
Stoke City	2011–12	Premier League	34	3	3	2	2	0	10 (Note: Appearances in UEFA Europa League)	0	—		49	5
Stoke City	2012–13	Premier League	35	1	3	0	1	0	—		—		39	1
Stoke City	2013–14	Premier League	12	0	0	0	3	0	—		—		15	0
Stoke City	2014–15	Premier League	1	0	1	0	2	0	—		—		4	0
Stoke City	Total		149	13	18	5	11	0	10	0	0	0	188	18
Leicester City (loan)	2014–15	Premier League	14	1	—		—		—		—		14	1
Leicester City	2015–16	Premier League	35	3	0	0	0	0	—		—		35	3
Leicester City	2016–17	Premier League	33	2	2	0	0	0	8	0	1 (Note: Appearance in FA Community Shield)	0	44	2
Leicester City	2017–18	Premier League	0	0	0	0	0	0	—		—		0	0
Leicester City	Total		82	6	2	0	0	0	8	0	1	0	93	6
Leicester City U21	2017–18	—			—		—		—		1 (Note: Appearance in EFL Trophy)	0	1	0
Career total			326	21	35	6	15	0	29	1	2	0	407	28

=== International ===
Appearances and goals by national team and year
National team	Year	Apps	Goals
Germany	2004	4	0
Germany	2005	10	1
Germany	2006	3	1
Germany	2009	2	0
Total		19	2

Scores and results list Germany's goal tally first.

List of international goals scored by Robert Huth
No.	Date	Venue	Opponent	Score	Result	Competition
1.	29 June 2005	Zentralstadion, Leipzig, Germany	Mexico	3–2	4–3 (a.e.t.)	2005 FIFA Confederations Cup
2.	1 March 2006	Stadio Artemio Franchi, Florence, Italy	Italy	1–4	1–4	Friendly

== Honours ==
Chelsea

- Premier League: 2004–05, 2005–06

Stoke City

- FA Cup runner-up: 2010–11

Leicester City

- Premier League: 2015–16

Germany

- FIFA World Cup third place: 2006
- FIFA Confederations Cup third place: 2005

Individual

- Stoke City Coaching Staff's Player of the Year: 2009–10
- Stoke City Player of the Year: 2010–11
- Stoke City Players' Player of the Year: 2010–11
