= Alberto Medina =

Mexican footballer (born 1983)

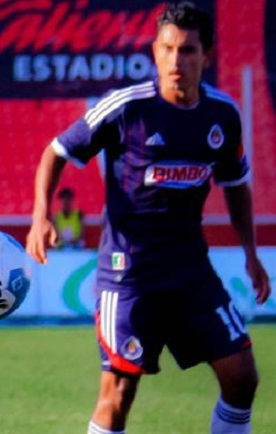
- Medina playing for Guadalajara

Personal information
- Full name: Alberto Medina Briseño
- Date of birth: 29 May 1983 (age 43)
- Place of birth: Culiacán, Sinaloa, Mexico
- Height: 1.72 m (5 ft 8 in)
- Position: Winger

Senior career*
Years	Team	Apps	(Gls)
2000–2012	Guadalajara	324	(51)
2006	Chivas Coras Tepic	1	(0)
2007	Tapatío	1	(0)
2012	Pachuca	6	(0)
2013–2014	Puebla	31	(1)
2014–2015	→ Chiapas (loan)	4	(0)
2015–2016	Oaxaca	25	(1)
2016–2017	Coras	23	(2)
Total		414	(58)

International career
2003–2010	Mexico	55	(6)
Medal record
Representing Mexico
Winner	CONCACAF Gold Cup	2009
Runner-up	CONCACAF Gold Cup	2007
Third place	Copa América	2007
- * Club domestic league appearances and goals

Alberto Medina Briseño (born 29 May 1983) is a Mexican former professional footballer who played as a winger. He is known as El Venado (The Deer) due to his speed.

== Club career ==
Medina made his professional debut for Chivas on 8 August 2000 at 17 years old. Alberto "El Venado" Medina (at the time of reporting) had seven goals in the Apertura 2006, alongside his partners Adolfo Bautista and Omar Bravo, and he was a major factor in Chivas' Championship win for the Apertura 2006 Tournament. Medina had the game–winning assist in the championship game of the Apertura 2006 Tournament.

Beto (Medina) had a tremendous start to the Clausura 2007 Tournament, scoring six goals in eighteen games in the league. One of his more amazing goals came in the Super Clásico game against rivals America. A lob pass came from Diego Martínez, which Medina controlled in the box and, with perfect technique, cut and finished excellently with a powerful shot over America's goalie, Guillermo Ochoa. Chivas went on to win 2–0 at home. Medina is part of the attacking duo on the pitch alongside his teammate Omar Bravo, often switching sides on either wing to confuse the rival team. Alberto has shown that he is an important part of Chivas with his blistering speed, ball control and accurate crosses.

On 2 June 2012, Chivas sold Medina to Pachuca due to the poor last two seasons he had. Medina played for Chivas from 2000 to 2012, during which he registered 323 caps in the Mexican League with 52 goals and 39 assists.

Later that year, on 28 November, Pachuca confirmed that Medina was sold to Puebla F.C. for the next season.

== International career ==
Ricardo Lavolpe called Medina to Mexico's national team many times, be it for friendly matches in 2003, the Athens Olympic Games in 2004, or for the 2005 Confederations Cup in Germany as a substitute for senior players such as Jared Borgetti or fellow Chivas player Ramón Morales.

He was called upon once again to represent the Selección de fútbol de México (Mexico national team) during Hugo Sánchez's tenure as coach. He represented his country in the 2007 Gold Cup tournament, where they were finalist. He also played in Venezuela in the Copa América 2007, where his country won 3rd place and only lost to Argentina in the semi-finals.

Alberto was recalled to the national team under coach Javier Aguirre's second stint. Medina made Aguirre's squad for the 2010 FIFA World Cup, scoring in all the friendlies before the start of the tournament, but did not appear in any matches.

== Career statistics ==
=== International ===
As of match played 3 June 2010

National team	Year	Apps	Goals
Mexico	2003	2	0
Mexico	2004	3	1
Mexico	2005	18	1
Mexico	2006	1	0
Mexico	2007	11	0
Mexico	2009	11	0
Mexico	2010	9	4
Total		55	6

=== International goals ===
Scores and results list Mexico's goal tally first.

Goal	Date	Venue	Opponent	Score	Result	Competition
1.	November 10, 2004	Alamodome, San Antonio, United States	Guatemala	2–0	2–0	Friendly
2.	July 13, 2005	Reliant Stadium, Houston, United States	Jamaica	1–0	1–0	2005 CONCACAF Gold Cup
3.	May 10, 2010	Soldier Field, Chicago, United States	Senegal	1–0	1–0	Friendly
4.	May 16, 2010	Estadio Azteca, Mexico City, Mexico	Chile	1–0	1–0	Friendly
5.	May 30, 2010	Hans-Walter-Wild-Stadion, Bayreuth, Germany	Gambia	5–1	5–1	Friendly
6.	June 3, 2010	King Baudouin Stadium, Brussels, Belgium	Italy	2–0	2–1	Friendly

== Honours ==
Guadalajara

- Mexican Primera División: Apertura 2006
- InterLiga 2009

Mexico

- CONCACAF Gold Cup: 2009
