= Pedro Senatore Ramos =

Ecuadorian football referee

Pedro Senatore Ramos (born 2 May 1968 in Guayaquil) is an Ecuadorian association football referee, best known for having supervised one match during the 2004 Copa América in Peru. He also refereed at the 2006 Copa Libertadores.
