= César Delgado =

Argentine footballer (born 1981)

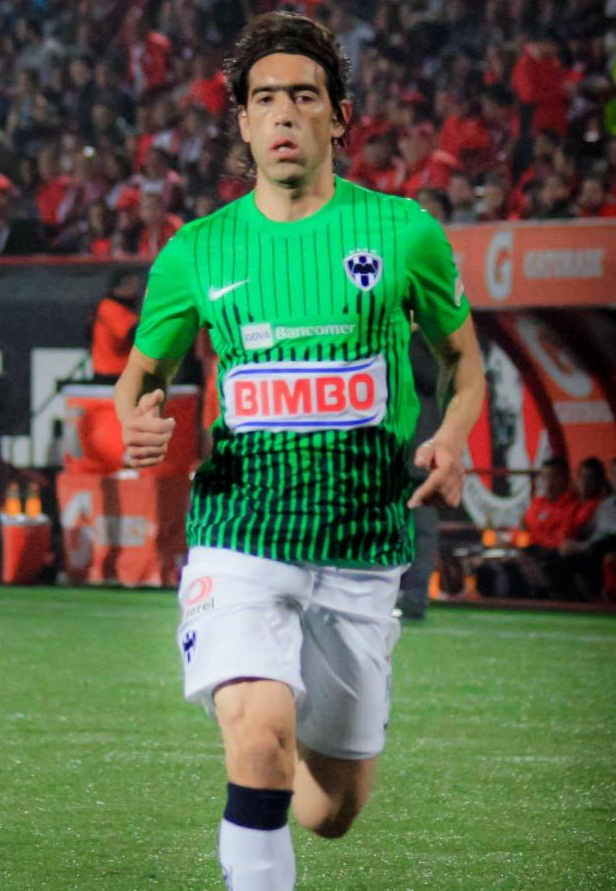
- Delgado playing for Monterrey in 2012

Personal information
- Full name: César Fabián Delgado Godoy
- Date of birth: 18 August 1981 (age 45)
- Place of birth: Rosario, Argentina
- Height: 1.74 m (5 ft 9 in)
- Position: Winger

Senior career*
Years	Team	Apps	(Gls)
2001–2003	Rosario Central	65	(14)
2003–2008	Cruz Azul	151	(61)
2008–2011	Lyon	72	(7)
2011–2014	Monterrey	104	(22)
2015–2017	Rosario Central	25	(2)
2017–2019	Central Córdoba		

International career
2004	Argentina U-23	13	(3)
2003–2005	Argentina	20	(2)
Medal record
Men's Football
Representing Argentina
Olympic Games
Gold medal – first place	2004 Athens	Team
Copa América
Runner-up	2004 Peru
- * Club domestic league appearances and goals

César Fabián Delgado Godoy (born 18 August 1981) is an Argentine former professional footballer who played as a winger. He also played as a central midfielder, making piercing forward runs through the center of the opposition's defence. His nickname "Chelito" is derived from that of Marcelo Delgado (known as "El Chelo") because of their same last name. Since 2013, he also holds Mexican citizenship.

== Club career ==
Born in Rosario, Argentina, Delgado started his career at Rosario Central. He joined Cruz Azul for the 2003 Apertura, where he finished with 16 appearances and eight goals. Delgado made 21 appearances in the subsequent Apertura, again scoring eight goals. In the 2004 Apertura, Delgado scored another six goals in 15 games.

On 8 January 2008, Delgado moved to French club Lyon who paid a transfer fee of €11 million. He made his Ligue 1 debut on 20 January 2008 against RC Lens. Delgado came on as an 85th-minute substitute Lisandro López on 21 October 2009 against Liverpool in the UEFA Champions League and scored the winning goal in a 2–1 victory. It was Lyon's first win in the UEFA Champions League against English opposition.

On 10 June 2011, Delgado signed with C.F. Monterrey, and participated in the 2011 Mexican League Apertura, CONCACAF Champions League and Club World Cup tournaments.

== International career ==
Delgado played for Argentina in the 2004 Copa América, scoring one goal, and was part of their gold medal-winning team at the 2004 Summer Olympics.

He played several matches for the Argentina national team during 2006 FIFA World Cup qualification, but due to injury he did not make the 23-man squad for the tournament.

== Career statistics ==
=== Club ===
Appearances and goals by club, season and competition
Club	Season	League		
Club	Season	Division	Apps	Goals
Rosario Central	2001–02	Argentine Primera División	27	3
Rosario Central	2002–03	Argentine Primera División	38	11
Cruz Azul	2003–04	Liga MX	37(29)	16(13)
Cruz Azul	2004–05	Liga MX	33(29)	16(14)
Cruz Azul	2005–06	Liga MX	38(32)	18(18)
Cruz Azul	2006–07	Liga MX	27(25)	7(7)
Cruz Azul	2007–08	Liga MX	24	9
Lyon	2007–08	Ligue 1	7	0
Lyon	2008–09	Ligue 1	31(19)	3(2)
Lyon	2009–10	Ligue 1	36(27)	5(4)
Lyon	2010–11	Ligue 1	15	1
Monterrey	2011–12	Liga MX	69	15
Total			337	91

=== International ===
Appearances and goals by national team and year
National team	Year	Apps	Goals
Argentina	2003	5	1
Argentina	2004	11	1
Argentina	2005	4	0
Total		20	2

Scores and results list Argentina's goal tally first, score column indicates score after each Delgado goal.

List of international goals scored by César Delgado
No.	Date	Venue	Opponent	Score	Result	Competition
1	9 September 2003	Estadio Olímpico, Caracas, Venezuela	Venezuela	3–0	3–0	2006 FIFA World Cup qualification
2	25 July 2004	Estadio Nacional del Perú, Lima, Peru	Brazil	2–1	2–2 (2–4 p.)	2004 Copa America Final

== Honours ==
Cruz Azul

- Copa Panamericana 2007

Lyon

- Ligue 1: 2007–08
- Coupe de France: 2007–08

Monterrey

- CONCACAF Champions League: 2011–12, 2012–13

Argentina

- Olympic Games: 2004
- Copa América runner-up: 2004
- FIFA Confederations Cup Runner-up: 2005

Individual

- FIFA Club World Cup top scorer: 2012, 2013
