= Mario Méndez (Mexican footballer) =

Mexican footballer (born 1979)

Personal information
- Full name: Mario Méndez Olagüe
- Date of birth: 1 June 1979 (age 47)
- Place of birth: Guadalajara, Jalisco, Mexico
- Height: 1.75 m (5 ft 9 in)
- Position: Right-back

Senior career*
Years	Team	Apps	(Gls)
1998–2003	Atlas	195	(11)
2004–2005	Toluca	71	(2)
2006	Monterrey	10	(0)
2006	Tigres UANL	15	(0)
2007–2008	Vélez Sársfield	29	(0)
2008–2012	Toluca	68	(4)
2009–2010	→ Atlas (loan)	26	(0)
2011–2012	→ Irapuato (loan)	25	(0)
2013	San Luis	1	(0)

International career^{‡}
2000–2008	Mexico	37	(1)
Medal record
Representing Mexico
CONCACAF Gold Cup
Winner	CONCACAF Gold Cup	2003
- * Club domestic league appearances and goals as of 1 October 2012 ‡ National team caps and goals as of 12 June 2011

Mario Méndez Olagüe (born 1 June 1979) is a Mexican former professional footballer who played as a right-back.

== Career ==
Mario Méndez started his career with Club Atlas in the year 1998, in the golden age that included many (at the time, promising) players like Rafael Márquez, Daniel Osorno, Juan Pablo Rodriguez and Miguel Zepeda. With Atlas he got a sub-championship in the year of 1999 having been a vital part in the defense. He stayed with this club until 2004. In 2004 Mario Mendéz was bought by Deportivo Toluca F.C., where he was an important player in the squad playing 49 games and scoring one goal.

Méndez would be sent to Monterrey to play in the Rayados of Monterrey. His time there was limited as he was in the Mexico national team (Spanish: Selección de fútbol de México) in the 2005 FIFA Confederations Cup. Later that year he was transferred to Tigres on 29 May 2006. He previously played on loan for the Tigres' arch-rival Rayados of Monterrey, and was signed with Club Toluca who negotiated the transference with Tigres.

He was called up to the Mexico national team at the 2006 World Cup. He started for Mexico's first two games against Iran, Angola and later, in the Elimination Round of 16 against Argentina. In the game against Iran he made an assist in the goal of Zihna. Although he had been criticized for his occasional careless plays and teamwork abilities on the national team, he continuesd to be one of Mexico's important talented players.

During the Winter Transfer period, Ricardo Lavolpe, head coach of the Argentine Vélez Sársfield, called on the talents of Mario Méndez for Vélez Sársfield

After Lavolpe's resignation as coach Mendez returned to Mexico, joining Club Toluca.

During the Hugo Sanchez era, Mendez was not called up for Mexico. Méndez returned to the team under the new manager Sven-Göran Eriksson. He appeared in the September 2008 friendly match against Chile (a 1–0 defeat), coming on as a substitute for Jaime Correa Córdoba. He was loaned out to CD Irapuato on 12 June 2011 after being transferred from Club Toluca. He retired in 2013.

== Honours ==
Toluca

- Mexican Primera División: Apertura 2005, Apertura 2008

Mexico

- CONCACAF Gold Cup: 2003

Individual

- Liga MX Best Rookie: Invierno 1998
- Liga MX Best Full-back: Clausura 2009

== Career statistics ==
=== International goals ===
Goal	Date	Venue	Opponent	Score	Result	Competition
1.	January 19, 2000	Estadio Tecnológico, Monterrey, Mexico	Romania	2–1	3–1	Friendly
