= 2004 Copa América final =

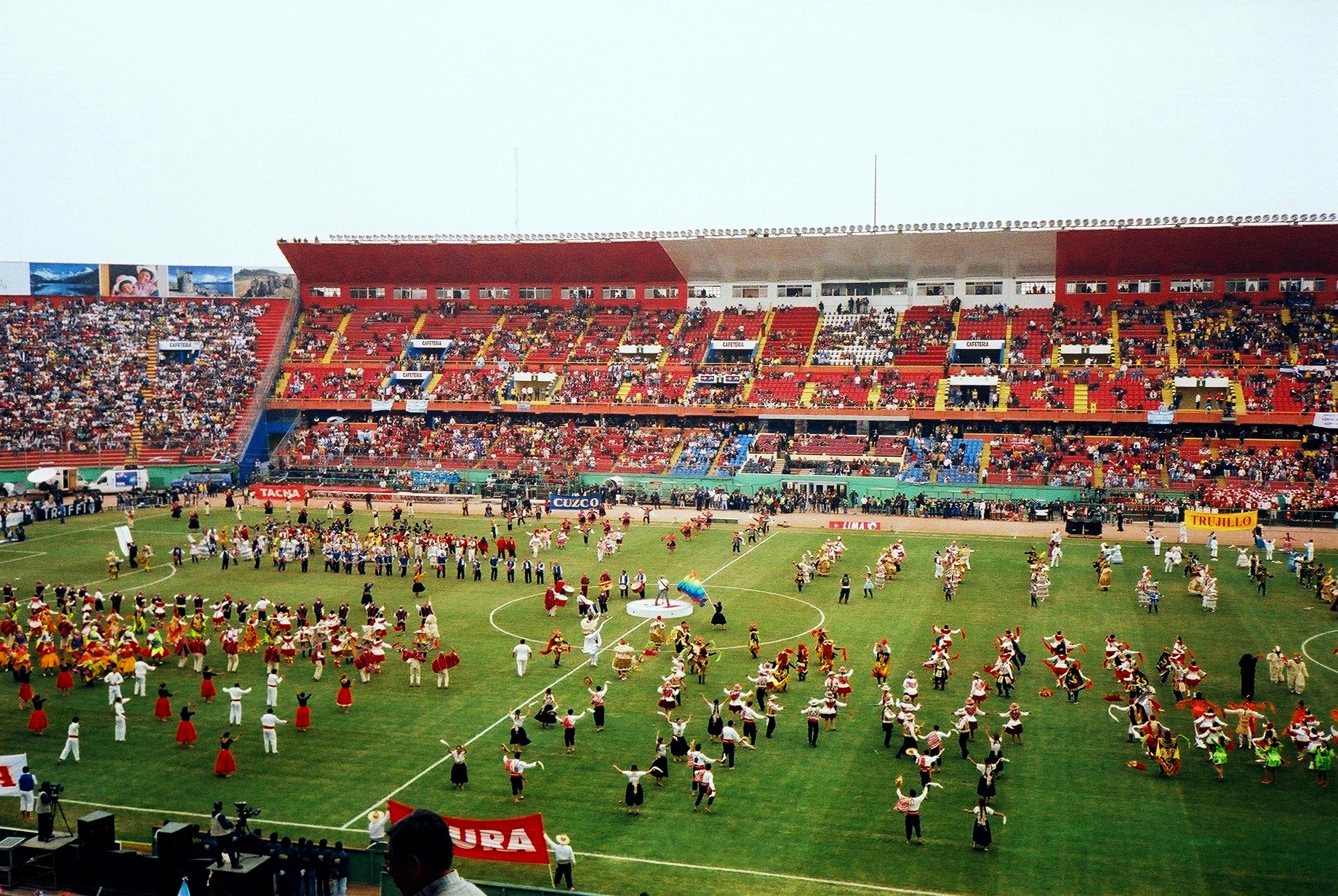
- The Estadio Nacional in Lima hosted the final
- Event: 2004 Copa América
Argentina	Brazil
(Argentina)	(Brazil)
2	2
- Brazil won 4–2 on penalties
- Date: 25 July 2004
- Venue: Estadio Nacional, Lima
- Referee: Carlos Amarilla (Paraguay)
- Attendance: 43,000
- Weather: Overcast; 17 °C (63 °F)

The 2004 Copa América final was the final of the 41st Copa América. The match was played in Lima, for the first time. This was the fifth final for Brazil (winning two). Meanwhile, it was the second for Argentina (winning one).

Carlos Amarilla was the referee for the final match. He previously refereed two matches in the tournament, both involving Argentina: against Ecuador in the first round and against the host Peru in the quarter-finals.

== Route to the final ==
Argentina
Round
Brazil
Opponent
Result
Group stage
Opponent
Result
Ecuador
6–1
Match 1
Chile
1–0
Mexico
0–1
Match 2
Costa Rica
4–1
Uruguay
4–2
Match 3
Paraguay
1–2

Team	Pld	W	D	L	GF	GA	GD	Pts
Mexico	3	2	1	0	5	3	+2	7
Argentina	3	2	0	1	10	4	+6	6
Uruguay	3	1	1	1	6	7	−1	4
Ecuador	3	0	0	3	3	10	−7	0

Final standings

Team	Pld	W	D	L	GF	GA	GD	Pts
Paraguay	3	2	1	0	4	2	+2	7
Brazil	3	2	0	1	6	3	+3	6
Costa Rica	3	1	0	2	3	6	−3	3
Chile	3	0	1	2	2	4	−2	1

Opponent
Result
Knockout stage
Opponent
Result
Peru
1–0
Quarter-finals
Mexico
4–0
Colombia
3–0
Semi-finals
Uruguay
1–1
(5–3 pen.)

== Match details ==
25 July 2004
15:00

Argentina	2–2	Brazil
K. González 21' (pen.); Delgado 87'	Report	Luisão 45+1'; Adriano 90+3'
Penalties
D'Alessandro (penalty missed); Heinze (penalty missed); K. González (penalty scored); Sorín (penalty scored)	2–4	(penalty scored) Adriano; (penalty scored) Edu; (penalty scored) Diego; (penalty scored) Juan

Estadio Nacional, Lima
Attendance: 43,000
Referee: Carlos Amarilla (Paraguay)

Argentina	Brazil

GK	1	Roberto Abbondanzieri
CB	22	Fabricio Coloccini
CB	2	Roberto Ayala (c)
CB	6	Gabriel Heinze
RWB	8	Javier Zanetti
LWB	3	Juan Pablo Sorín	(yellow card) 25'
DM	5	Javier Mascherano	(yellow card) 72'
RM	21	Mauro Rosales		(substituted off) 64'
CM	16	Lucho González		(substituted off) 75'
LM	18	Kily González
CF	11	Carlos Tevez		(substituted off) 90'
Substitutions:
FW	19	César Delgado		(substituted on) 64'
MF	10	Andrés D'Alessandro		(substituted on) 75'
DF	4	Facundo Quiroga		(substituted on) 90'
Manager:
Marcelo Bielsa

GK	1	Júlio César	(yellow card) 51'
RB	13	Maicon
CB	3	Luisão	(yellow card) 58'	(substituted off) 82'
CB	4	Juan
LB	6	Gustavo Nery
CM	8	Kléberson		(substituted off) 55'
CM	5	Renato
CM	11	Edu	(yellow card) 38'
AM	10	Alex (c)		(substituted off) 63'
CF	9	Luís Fabiano
CF	7	Adriano
Substitutions:
MF	19	Diego		(substituted on) 55'
MF	20	Felipe		(substituted on) 63'
DF	15	Cris		(substituted on) 82'
Manager:
Carlos Alberto Parreira
