= Pável Pardo =

Mexican footballer (born 1976)

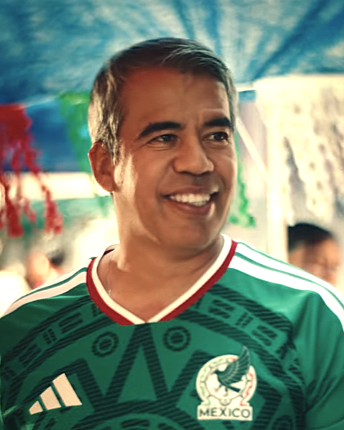
- Pardo in 2025

Personal information
- Full name: Pável Pardo Segura
- Date of birth: 26 July 1976 (age 50)
- Place of birth: Guadalajara, Jalisco, Mexico
- Height: 1.75 m (5 ft 9 in)
- Position: Defensive midfielder

Senior career*
| Years | Team | Apps | (Gls) |
| 1993–1998 | Atlas | 156 | (7) |
| 1998–1999 | Tecos | 34 | (5) |
| 1999–2006 | América | 244 | (22) |
| 2006–2009 | VfB Stuttgart | 71 | (4) |
| 2009–2011 | América | 86 | (3) |
| 2011–2012 | Chicago Fire | 41 | (2) |
| Total | | 632 | (43) |

International career
| 1996–2009 | Mexico | 147 | (11) |
Medal record
Men's football
Representing Mexico
FIFA Confederations Cup
| Winner | 1999 Mexico |
CONCACAF Gold Cup
| Winner | 1998 United States |
| Winner | 2003 United States–Mexico |
| Runner-up | 2007 United States |
Copa América
| Third place | 1997 Bolivia |
| Third place | 1999 Paraguay |
Pan American Games
| Silver medal – second place | 1995 Mar del Plata | Team |
- * Club domestic league appearances and goals

Pável Pardo Segura (Spanish: [ˈpaβel ˈpaɾðo]; born 26 July 1976) is a Mexican former professional footballer who played as a defensive midfielder.

Pardo spent most of his career playing with Club América and is the fourth-most capped player in the history of the Mexico national team. Pardo participated in two World Cups (1998 and 2006), won two CONCACAF Gold Cups and won the FIFA Confederations Cup with Mexico in 1999.

== Club career ==
Pardo started his football career in 1993 with Atlas de Guadalajara, and later played with Tecos UAG before joining Club América. He is regarded as one of the best players in Mexico since the 1990s, having achieved great success with Club América, where he won the Mexican Torneo de Verano 2002, Torneo de Clausura in 2005 and the CONCACAF Champions Cup tournament in 2006.

After participating with Mexico in high-profile tournaments, namely the 2005 FIFA Confederations Cup and the 2006 FIFA World Cup, both of which were held in Germany, Pardo began to attract attention from a number of international clubs. Rumors linked him with River Plate of Argentina and Recreativo Huelva of Spain, however Pardo was unable to reach an agreement with either club.

=== VfB Stuttgart ===
Following the World Cup, Pardo joined VfB Stuttgart, for a sum of €1 million, the same club that purchased Pardo's national teammate, Ricardo Osorio. Pardo scored his first goal for Stuttgart in a 16 September 2006 league contest and win against Werder Bremen.

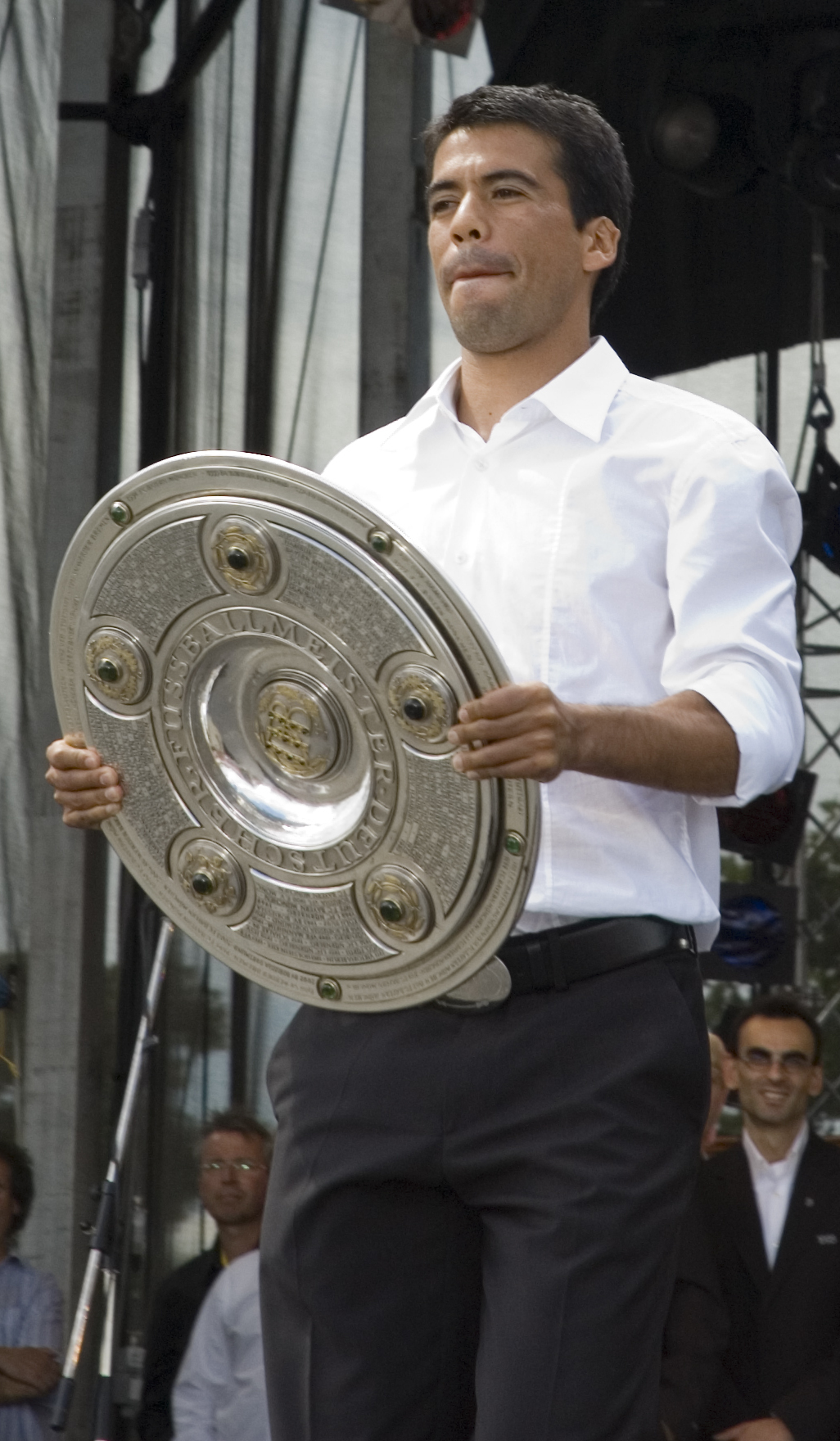
Pardo holding the 2006–07 season title

On 19 May 2007, Stuttgart won the Bundesliga with Pardo, who appeared in 33 complete games, serving as one of the pillars of the team. He was voted the fifth-best player in his first season in Germany. In the 2007–08 season, his second year at Stuttgart, he established himself as one of the leading players, due to his constant and solid performances and also because, at 32, he was one of the older players in the otherwise young VfB side. Therefore, he earned the nickname el comandante or el jefe in the team.

=== Return to América ===
In January 2009, he returned to Club América for a fee of US $600,000.

=== Chicago Fire ===
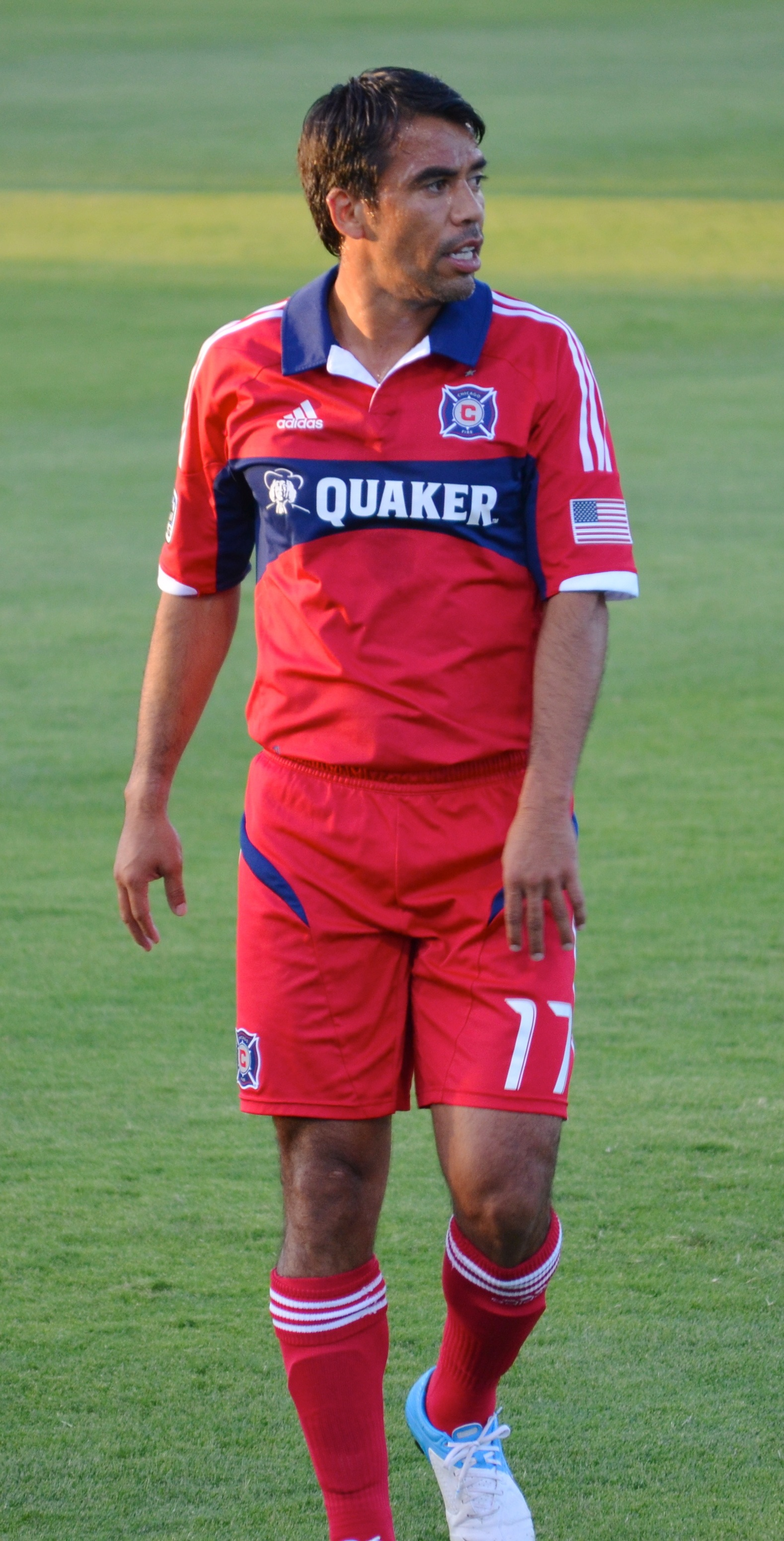
Pardo with Chicago Fire

In July 2011, Pardo revealed he would be signing with a Major League Soccer team after América allowed him to terminate his contract with them and thus sign on a free transfer with MLS, and signed with the Chicago Fire on 26 July 2011. Pardo re-signed with Chicago for the 2012 season on 18 January 2012.

On 19 January 2013, Pardo announced his retirement from football.

== International career ==
Pardo made his international debut for Mexico in 1996, playing in the U.S. Cup tournament, against the USA. Since then, Pardo has captained his country in several occasions and played important roles for the national team for many years, helping his country to winning the 1998 and 2003 CONCACAF Gold Cup tournaments and the 1999 FIFA Confederations Cup. He played in France 98, as well as the 1997 Copa América and 1999 and the mentioned 2005 Confederations Cup and 2006 World Cup.

At the 1998 World Cup, Pardo was sent off in the match between Belgium and Mexico. Referee Hugh Dallas was criticised for his actions during the game after he also sent off Gert Verheyen.

On 21 June 2007, he played in the 2007 Gold Cup, helping Mexico earn second place. The day after the game he announced that he would not go to 2007 Copa América because he needed some rest. The national side eventually ended up in third place in that tournament.

On 20 August 2008, he helped Mexico to a 2–1 win over Honduras at home in their first World Cup qualifier match at Estadio Azteca, scoring a brace in the 72nd and 75th minute respectively after trailing 1–0.

He was called up to play again against Honduras after missing the squad due to injury or call-ups from VfB Stuttgart.

== Style of play ==
Pardo was a well-rounded defensive player. He started playing as a right back, but he could double as a left back, and was also often deployed in the defensive midfield position, especially later in his career. He was often his team's designated set piece taker, as he was an excellent crosser. Many of his goals came from free kicks (either direct shots or undeflected inswinging crosses) and penalties. A leader on the field, he often served as captain for the teams he played for.

== Career statistics ==
=== Club ===
Appearances and goals by club, season and competition
| Club | Season | League | | | Cup | | Continental | | Total | |
| Club | Season | Division | Apps | Goals | Apps | Goals | Apps | Goals | Apps | Goals |
|---|---|---|---|---|---|---|---|---|---|---|
| Atlas | 1993–94 | Primera División de México | 28 | 0 | | | | | 28 | 0 |
| Atlas | 1994–95 | Primera División de México | 29 | 2 | 1 | 0 | | | 30 | 2 |
| Atlas | 1995–96 | Primera División de México | 35 | 1 | 5 | 0 | | | 40 | 1 |
| Atlas | 1996–97 | Primera División de México | 30 | 0 | 6 | 0 | | | 36 | 0 |
| Atlas | 1997–98 | Primera División de México | 32 | 4 | | | | | 32 | 4 |
| Atlas | Total | | 154 | 7 | 12 | 0 | | | 166 | 7 |
| Tecos | 1998–99 | Primera División de México | 34 | 5 | | | | | 34 | 5 |
| América | 1999–00 | Primera División de México | 36 | 7 | 3 | 0 | 16 | 2 | 55 | 9 |
| América | 2000–01 | Primera División de México | 35 | 0 | 3 | 0 | | | 38 | 0 |
| América | 2001–02 | Primera División de México | 37 | 1 | 4 | 0 | 16 | 0 | 57 | 1 |
| América | 2002–03 | Primera División de México | 36 | 5 | 0 | 0 | 3 | 1 | 39 | 6 |
| América | 2003–04 | Primera División de México | 35 | 4 | 4 | 0 | 8 | 2 | 47 | 6 |
| América | 2004–05 | Primera División de México | 36 | 2 | 3 | 0 | 4 | 0 | 43 | 2 |
| América | 2005–06 | Primera División de México | 29 | 3 | | | 2 | 0 | 31 | 3 |
| América | Total | | 244 | 22 | 17 | 0 | 49 | 5 | 310 | 27 |
| VfB Stuttgart | 2006–07 | Bundesliga | 33 | 1 | 6 | 1 | | | 39 | 2 |
| VfB Stuttgart | 2007–08 | Bundesliga | 29 | 2 | 3 | 0 | 4 | 1 | 36 | 3 |
| VfB Stuttgart | 2008–09 | Bundesliga | 9 | 1 | 1 | 0 | 8 | 0 | 18 | 1 |
| VfB Stuttgart | Total | | 71 | 4 | 10 | 1 | 12 | 1 | 93 | 6 |
| América | 2009 | Primera División de México | 16 | 1 | | | | | 16 | 1 |
| América | 2009–10 | Primera División de México | 37 | 2 | 4 | 0 | | | 41 | 2 |
| América | 2010–11 | Primera División de México | 33 | 0 | | | 6 | 0 | 39 | 0 |
| América | Total | | 86 | 3 | 4 | 0 | 6 | 0 | 96 | 3 |
| Chicago Fire | 2011 | Major League Soccer | 13 | 1 | 1 | 0 | | | 14 | 1 |
| Chicago Fire | 2012 | Major League Soccer | 28 | 1 | | | | | 28 | 1 |
| Chicago Fire | Total | | 41 | 2 | 1 | 0 | | | 42 | 2 |
| Career total | | | 630 | 43 | 44 | 1 | 67 | 6 | 741 | 50 |

=== International ===
Appearances and goals by national team and year
| National team | Year | Apps | Goals |
|---|---|---|---|
| Mexico | 1996 | 8 | 0 |
| Mexico | 1997 | 23 | 0 |
| Mexico | 1998 | 14 | 0 |
| Mexico | 1999 | 19 | 1 |
| Mexico | 2000 | 10 | 1 |
| Mexico | 2001 | 12 | 1 |
| Mexico | 2002 | 0 | 0 |
| Mexico | 2003 | 11 | 1 |
| Mexico | 2004 | 9 | 1 |
| Mexico | 2005 | 13 | 1 |
| Mexico | 2006 | 11 | 0 |
| Mexico | 2007 | 7 | 1 |
| Mexico | 2008 | 5 | 3 |
| Mexico | 2009 | 5 | 1 |
| Total | | 147 | 11 |

Scores and results list Mexico's goal tally first, score column indicates score after each Pardo goal.

List of international goals scored by Pável Pardo
| No. | Date | Venue | Opponent | Score | Result | Competition |
|---|---|---|---|---|---|---|
| 1 | 27 July 1999 | Estadio Azteca, Mexico City, Mexico | Egypt | 1–0 | 2–2 | 1999 FIFA Confederations Cup |
| 2 | 19 January 2000 | Estadio Tecnológico, Monterrey, Mexico | Romania | 1–1 | 3–1 | Friendly |
| 3 | 25 April 2001 | Hasely Crawford Stadium, Port of Spain, Trinidad and Tobago | Trinidad and Tobago | 1–1 | 1–1 | 2002 FIFA World Cup qualification |
| 4 | 19 March 2003 | Texas Stadium, Irving, United States | Bolivia | 1–0 | 2–0 | Friendly |
| 5 | 7 July 2004 | Estadio Elías Aguirre, Chiclayo, Peru | Uruguay | 2–1 | 2–2 | Copa América 2004 |
| 6 | 5 September 2005 | Estadio Azteca, Mexico City, Mexico | Panama | 5–0 | 5–0 | 2006 FIFA World Cup qualification |
| 7 | 21 June 2007 | Soldier Field, Chicago, United States | Guadeloupe | 1–0 | 1–0 | 2007 CONCACAF Gold Cup |
| 8 | 26 March 2008 | Craven Cottage, London, England | Ghana | 2–1 | 2–1 | Friendly |
| 9 | 20 August 2008 | Estadio Azteca, Mexico City, Mexico | Honduras | 1–1 | 2–1 | 2010 FIFA World Cup qualification |
| 10 | 20 August 2008 | Estadio Azteca, Mexico City, Mexico | Honduras | 2–1 | 2–1 | 2010 FIFA World Cup qualification |
| 11 | 28 March 2009 | Estadio Azteca, Mexico City, Mexico | Costa Rica | 2–0 | 2–0 | 2010 FIFA World Cup qualification |

== Honours ==
América

- Mexican Primera División: Verano 2002, Clausura 2005
- Campeón de Campeones: 2005
- CONCACAF Champions Cup: 2006
- InterLiga: 2004

VfB Stuttgart

- Bundesliga: 2006–07
- UEFA Intertoto Cup: 2008

Mexico

- FIFA Confederations Cup: 1999
- CONCACAF Gold Cup: 1998, 2003
- Pan American Games Silver Medal: 1995
- CONCACAF Pre-Olympic Tournament: 1996

Individual

- Mexican Primera División Best Full-back: 1996–97, Invierno 1997
- Mexican Primera División Best Defensive Midfielder: Clausura 2003, 2004–05, Apertura 2005
- Copa América Team of the Tournament: 2004
- CONCACAF Gold Cup All-Tournament Team: 2007

== See also ==
- List of men's footballers with 100 or more international caps
