= Ricardo Osorio =

Mexican footballer (born 1980)

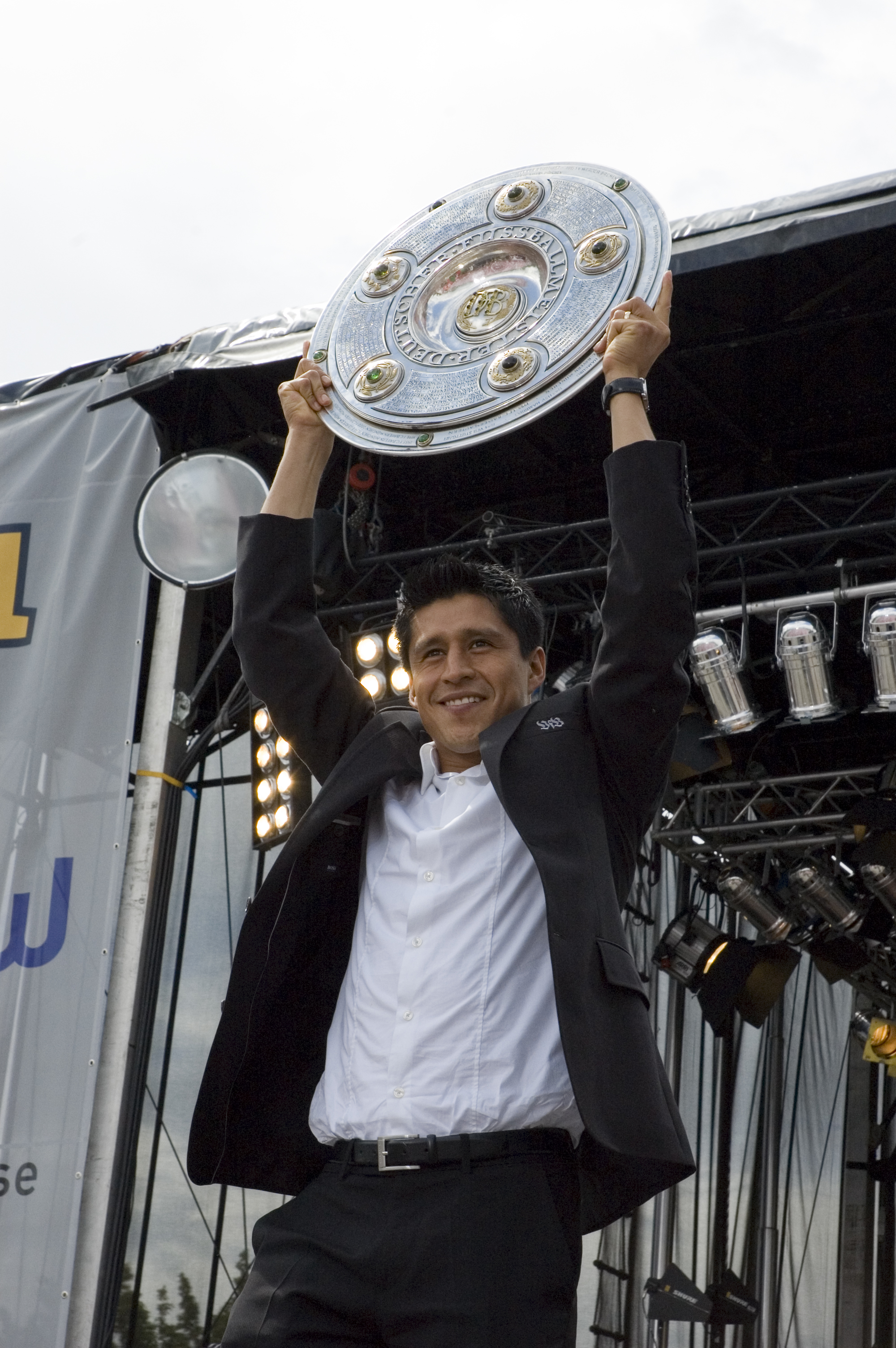
- Osorio in 2007

Personal information
- Full name: Ricardo Osorio Mendoza
- Date of birth: 30 March 1980 (age 46)
- Place of birth: Huajuapan de León, Mexico
- Height: 1.73 m (5 ft 8 in)
- Positions: Right-back; centre-back

Senior career*
Years	Team	Apps	(Gls)
2000–2001	Cruz Azul Hidalgo	25	(0)
2001–2006	Cruz Azul	140	(0)
2006–2010	VfB Stuttgart	73	(1)
2010–2016	Monterrey	114	(1)
2014–2015	→ Querétaro (loan)	30	(0)
Total		382	(2)

International career
2003–2011	Mexico	82	(1)
Medal record
Representing Mexico
CONCACAF Gold Cup
Winner	CONCACAF Gold Cup	2003
Winner	CONCACAF Gold Cup	2011
Runner-up	CONCACAF Gold Cup	2007
- * Club domestic league appearances and goals

Ricardo Osorio Mendoza (born 30 March 1980) is a Mexican former professional footballer who played as a defender.

== Club career ==
=== Early career ===
Born in Huajuapan de León, Oaxaca, Osorio made his debut in the Primera División de México in 2001–02 season with Cruz Azul in a match against Atlante F.C., with a 3–1 victory.

=== VfB Stuttgart ===
After a strong performance at the 2006 FIFA World Cup, Osorio signed a four-year, £4 million deal with German club VfB Stuttgart.

He scored his first goal in the Bundesliga for Stuttgart on 16 February 2007. The goal came at the 44th minute of the match against Eintracht Frankfurt. Stuttgart went on to win the game 4–0. On 19 May 2007, Stuttgart defeated Energie Cottbus 2–1, winning the Bundesliga, with Osorio making one of the highest number of appearances for the season.

On 2 May 2010, Stuttgart president Erwin Staudt announced that Osorio would be leaving the club on a Bosman transfer.

=== Monterrey ===
On 5 July 2010, he returned to Mexico after four years in Germany, signing for Monterrey. In his debut season, Monterrey won the Apertura 2010 championship, beating Santos Laguna in the final. They also won the CONCACAF Champions League, beating MLS club Real Salt Lake in the final.

== International career ==
Osorio won his first international cap for Mexico playing in the finals of the CONCACAF Gold Cup tournament against Brazil on 13 July 2003, winning 1–0. Osorio scored his first international goal on 7 July 2004 in a 2–2 draw against Uruguay in the 2004 Copa América.

In the 2005 FIFA Confederations Cup, Osorio missed a penalty in the semi-final which resulted in Mexico being eliminated. Osorio was selected in his country's squad for the 2006 FIFA World Cup in Germany, where he appeared in all four of Mexico's matches.

On 21 June 2007, Osorio played for Mexico against Guadeloupe in the CONCACAF Gold Cup tournament. After the match, he announced that he would not participate in the Copa América tournament, due to overloaded work schedules with his club, who would also play in the 2007–08 Champions League. He stated that he and teammate Pável Pardo had not taken any holiday break since the World Cup in Germany. Stuttgart coach Armin Veh was satisfied to hear this news and sent his thanks to national team coach Hugo Sánchez for letting the players rest and take a vacation.

Osorio played all four matches for Mexico at the 2010 FIFA World Cup in South Africa.

== Career statistics ==
=== Club ===
As of 19 August 2012

Club performance			League		Cup		Continental		Total	
Season	Club	League	Apps	Goals	Apps	Goals	Apps	Goals	Apps	Goals
Mexico			League		Cup		North America		Total	
2001–02	Cruz Azul	Primera División	11	0	-		-		11	0
2002–03	Cruz Azul	Primera División	36	0	-		-		36	0
2003–04	Cruz Azul	Primera División	40	0	-		-		40	0
2004–05	Cruz Azul	Primera División	28	0	-		-		38	0
2005–06	Cruz Azul	Primera División	25	0	-		-		25	0
Germany			League		DFB-Pokal		Europe		Total	
2006–07	VfB Stuttgart	Bundesliga	27	1	6	0	-		33	1
2007–08	VfB Stuttgart	Bundesliga	22	0	2	0	5	0	29	0
2008–09	VfB Stuttgart	Bundesliga	17	0	3	0	9	0	29	0
2009–10	VfB Stuttgart	Bundesliga	7	0	1	0	2	0	10	0
Mexico			League		Cup		North America		Total	
2010–11	Monterrey	Primera División	32	1	-		6	0	38	1
2011–12	Monterrey	Primera División	23	0	-		3	0	18	0
Total	Mexico		195	1	-		9	0	204	1
Total	Germany		73	1	12	0	16	0	101	1
Career total			268	2	12	0	25	0	305	2

=== International ===
As of 28 May 2011

National team	Year	Apps	Goals
Mexico	2003	7	0
Mexico	2004	8	1
Mexico	2005	19	0
Mexico	2006	9	0
Mexico	2007	9	0
Mexico	2008	11	0
Mexico	2009	8	0
Mexico	2010	9	0
Mexico	2011	2	0
Total		82	1

=== International goals ===
Goal	Date	Venue	Opponent	Score	Result	Competition
1.	7 July 2004	Estadio Elías Aguirre, Chiclayo, Peru	Uruguay	1–1	2–2	2004 Copa América

== Honours ==
VfB Stuttgart

- Bundesliga: 2006–07
- UEFA Intertoto Cup: 2008

Monterrey

- Mexican Primera División: Apertura 2010
- CONCACAF Champions League: 2010–11, 2011–12, 2012–13

Mexico

- CONCACAF Gold Cup: 2003, 2011

Individual

- CONCACAF Gold Cup Best XI: 2003
