= Jim Ouliaris =

Australian assistant referee (born 1966)

- Born: July 22, 1966 (age 60); Australia
- Other occupation: School teacher, Assistant Principal

Domestic
Years	League	Role
?–2004	National Soccer League	Assistant Referee
2005–2007	A-League	Assistant Referee

International
Years	League	Role
2002–2007	FIFA listed	Assistant Referee

Jim Ouliaris (born 22 July 1966) was an Australian assistant referee. He gained his FIFA accreditation in 2002 and retired from all forms of refereeing in 2007.

Ouliaris attended both the 2003 and 2005 FIFA Confederations Cups. He was in charge of Football Federation Victoria's Talented Officials Program (TOP). This program is now the Victorian Talent Pool. He was an assistant referee in the A-League and also the now defunct National Soccer League. He teaches at Canterbury Girls Secondary College in Melbourne.
