= Ramón Morales =

Mexican footballer (born 1975)

Personal information
- Full name: Ramón Morales Higuera
- Date of birth: 10 October 1975 (age 51)
- Place of birth: La Piedad, Michoacán, Mexico
- Height: 1.68 m (5 ft 6 in)
- Position: Midfielder

Senior career*
Years	Team	Apps	(Gls)
1993–1995	La Piedad	26	(15)
1995–1998	Monterrey	84	(3)
1999–2010	Guadalajara	378	(65)
2010–2011	Tecos	28	(1)
Total		520	(84)

International career
2001–2007	Mexico	64	(6)

Managerial career
- 2012–2013: Oro
- 2013–2015: Guadalajara Reserves and Academy
- 2015: Guadalajara (Interim)
- 2015: Guadalajara (Assistant)
- 2016: Guadalajara Reserves and Academy
- 2016: Coras
- 2023: Atlético Morelia (Assistant)
Medal record
Representing Mexico
Runner-up	CONCACAF Gold Cup	2007
Third place	Copa America	2007
- * Club domestic league appearances and goals

Ramón Morales Higuera (born 10 October 1975) is a Mexican former professional footballer who played as a midfielder and manager.

== Club career ==
Morales made his professional debut in the Mexican Primera División in 1995, playing for Rayados de Monterrey in a 0–0 draw match against Tecos UAG.

Ramón was a key figure for Guadalajara and has been so for years, aiding the team with swift counterattacks, precise crosses, and through passes. He was a vital part in Chivas' Championship Apertura 2006 season. On 27 December 2006, Ramón Morales was appointed as Chivas' new captain for the 2007 season following the departure of ex-Chiva Oswaldo Sánchez to Santos Laguna. Morales scored 66 goals for Guadalajara, which is ninth all-time in club history.

His younger brother Carlos, currently plays for Monarcas Morelia and is also a left midfielder.

On 11 August 2011, Morales announced his retirement from professional football after a 16-year career.

== International career ==
Morales made his international debut for the Mexico national team on 12 July 2001, playing against Brazil. Morales played for Mexico at the 2002 FIFA World Cup in Korea-Japan, where he appeared in four matches. He also played in the 2004 Copa América where he scored a freekick goal for Mexico's first official win over Argentina. The game ended 1–0 in favor of Mexico. He also played four games in the 2005 Confederations Cup, in Germany and five games in Mexico's qualification matches for the 2006 World Cup. Morales played in three matches in the 2006 FIFA World Cup. He scored a freekick in Mexico's 2–0 win over Brazil in the first round of the Copa América.

== Coaching career ==
On 6 January 2013, Morales was presented as the new coach for Guadalajara Sub-17 Team. On 1 December 2013 he was crowned champions with the Under 17 team in the final against los Tuzos de Pachuca. He was later moved up to be the under-20s coach.

On 3 October 2014, he was appointed as the interim coach of the first division team after the resignation of Carlos Bustos.

In June 2015, after success with the youth teams, he was appointed as the assistant manager of Jose Manuel de la Torre with the first team.

On 14 September 2015, after Jose Manuel de la Torre was released, Morales was appointed as Chivas' interim manager for the second time while a new coach was announced.

== Style of play ==
Morales played primarily as an attacking left midfielder. His playing style was characterized by pace, dribbling, and left-footed ball-striking, and he was used as a free-kick taker for both club and country. He was deployed in several positions on the left flank during his career, including left winger, left forward, and left-sided wing-back.

== Career statistics ==
=== International goals ===
Goal	Date	Venue	Opponent	Score	Result	Competition
1	23 August 2001	Estadio Luis "Pirata" Fuente, Veracruz, Mexico	Liberia	1–0	5–4	Friendly
2	13 March 2002	Qualcomm Stadium, San Diego, United States	Albania	3–0	4–0	Friendly
3	10 July 2004	Estadio Elías Aguirre, Chiclayo, Peru	Argentina	1–0	1–0	2004 Copa América
4	30 March 2005	Estadio Rommel Fernández, Panama City, Panama	Panama	1–0	1–1	2006 FIFA World Cup qualification
5	27 April 2005	Soldier Field, Chicago, United States	Poland	1–0	1–1	Friendly
6	27 June 2007	Polideportivo Cachamay, Puerto Ordaz, Venezuela	Brazil	2–0	2–0	2007 Copa América

== Honours ==
Guadalajara

- Mexican Primera División: Apertura 2006
- InterLiga: 2009

Individual

- Mexican Primera División Best Attacking Midfielder: Clausura 2006

Preceded by Oswaldo Sánchez	C.D. Guadalajara; Captain; 2007–2009	Succeeded by Luis Michel
