= 2004 Copa América =

Football tournament

Tournament details
- Host country: Peru
- Dates: 6–25 July
- Teams: 12 (from 2 confederations)
- Venues: 7 (in 7 host cities)

Final positions
- Champions: Brazil (7th title)
- Runners-up: Argentina
- Third place: Uruguay
- Fourth place: Colombia

Tournament statistics
- Matches played: 26
- Goals scored: 78 (3 per match)
- Attendance: 677,000 (26,038 per match)
- Top scorer: (Brazil) Adriano (7 goals)
- Best player: (Brazil) Adriano

The 2004 Copa América was the 41st edition of the Copa América, the South-American championship for international association football teams. The competition was organized by CONMEBOL, South America's football governing body, and was held in Peru, who hosted the tournament for the sixth time, from 6 to 25 July.

The tournament was won by Brazil in a shootout over Argentina. This made Brazil hold the World Cup and Copa América titles simultaneously for the second time in history, as happened after 1997 Copa América.

There is no qualifying tournament for the final tournament. CONMEBOL's 10 South American countries participated, along with two more invited countries, making a total of twelve teams competing in the tournament. The two invited countries for this edition of the Copa América were Mexico and Costa Rica.

== Venues ==
Lima	Cuzco	Arequipa
Estadio Nacional	Estadio Garcilaso	Estadio Arequipa
Capacity: 45,574	Capacity: 45,056	Capacity: 40,000
Piura	2004 Copa América is located in Peru	
Estadio Miguel Grau	2004 Copa América is located in Peru	
Capacity: 26,550	2004 Copa América is located in Peru	
Tacna	Chiclayo	Trujillo
Estadio Jorge Basadre	Estadio Elías Aguirre	Estadio Mansiche
Capacity: 25,850	Capacity: 25,000	Capacity: 25,000

== Squads ==
Each association had to present a list of twenty-two players to compete in the competition.

== Officials ==
- (Argentina) Héctor Baldassi
- (Bolivia) René Ortubé
- (Brazil) Márcio Rezende de Freitas
- (Chile) Rubén Selman
- (Colombia) Óscar Ruiz
- (Costa Rica) William Mattus
- (Ecuador) Pedro Ramos
- (Mexico) Marco Antonio Rodríguez
- (Paraguay) Carlos Amarilla
- (Peru) Eduardo Lecca
- (Peru) Gilberto Hidalgo
- (Venezuela) Gustavo Brand

== Draw ==
The draw for the competition took place on 8 March 2004 at the Lima Art Museum in Lima. The teams were divided into three groups of four teams each. For logistical reasons the three teams from Pots 1 & 4 were manually assigned to their groups ahead of the draw.

Pot 1	Pot 2	Pot 3	Pot 4
Peru (assigned to Group A); Argentina (assigned to Group B); Brazil (assigned to Group C)	Colombia; Paraguay; Uruguay	Venezuela; Costa Rica; Mexico	Bolivia (assigned to Group A); Ecuador (assigned to Group B); Chile (assigned to Group C)

== Group stage ==
Each team plays one match against each of the other teams within the same group. Three points are awarded for a win, one point for a draw and zero points for a defeat.

First and second placed teams, in each group, advance to the quarter-finals. The best third placed team and the second best third placed team, also advance to the quarter-finals.

Tie-breaking criteria

Teams were ranked on the following criteria:

1. Greater number of points in all group matches
2. Goal difference in all group matches
3. Greater number of goals scored in all group matches
4. Head-to-head results
5. Drawing of lots by the CONMEBOL Organising Committee

Key to colors in group tables
Group winners, runners-up, and best two third-placed teams advance to the quarterfinals

- All times local (UTC-5)

=== Group A ===
Team	Pld	W	D	L	GF	GA	GD	Pts
Colombia	3	2	1	0	4	2	+2	7
Peru	3	1	2	0	7	5	+2	5
Bolivia	3	0	2	1	3	4	−1	2
Venezuela	3	0	1	2	2	5	−3	1

6 July 2004
17:30

Venezuela	0–1	Colombia
	Report	Moreno 21' (pen.)

Estadio Nacional, Lima
Attendance: 45,000
Referee: Márcio Rezende (Brazil)
6 July 2004
20:15

Peru	2–2	Bolivia
Pizarro 67' (pen.); Palacios 86'	Report	Botero 35'; Álvarez 57'

Estadio Nacional, Lima
Attendance: 45,000
Referee: Héctor Baldassi (Argentina)

9 July 2004
17:30

Colombia	1–0	Bolivia
Perea 90'	Report

Estadio Nacional, Lima
Attendance: 35,000
Referee: Pedro Ramos (Ecuador)
9 July 2004
19:45

Peru	3–1	Venezuela
Farfán 34'; Solano 61'; Acasiete 72'	Report	Margiotta 74'

Estadio Nacional, Lima
Attendance: 43,000
Referee: Rubén Selman (Chile)

12 July 2004
17:30

Venezuela	1–1	Bolivia
Morán 27'	Report	Galindo 33'

Estadio Mansiche, Trujillo
Attendance: 25,000
Referee: Marco Antonio Rodríguez (Mexico)
12 July 2004
19:45

Peru	2–2	Colombia
Solano 58'; Maestri 60'	Report	Congo 33'; Aguilar 53'

Estadio Mansiche, Trujillo
Attendance: 25,000
Referee: William Mattus (Costa Rica)

=== Group B ===
Team	Pld	W	D	L	GF	GA	GD	Pts
Mexico	3	2	1	0	5	3	+2	7
Argentina	3	2	0	1	10	4	+6	6
Uruguay	3	1	1	1	6	7	−1	4
Ecuador	3	0	0	3	3	10	−7	0

7 July 2004
17:30

Mexico	2–2	Uruguay
Osorio 45'; Pardo 69'	Report	Bueno 43'; Montero 88'

Estadio Elías Aguirre, Chiclayo
Attendance: 25,000
Referee: Gilberto Hidalgo (Peru)
7 July 2004
19:45

Argentina	6–1	Ecuador
K. González 5' (pen.); Saviola 64', 74', 79'; D'Alessandro 84'; L. González 90'	Report	Delgado 62'

Estadio Elías Aguirre, Chiclayo
Attendance: 24,000
Referee: Carlos Amarilla (Paraguay)

10 July 2004
17:30

Uruguay	2–1	Ecuador
Forlán 61'; Bueno 78'	Report	Salas 73'

Estadio Elías Aguirre, Chiclayo
Attendance: 25,000
Referee: Gustavo Brand (Venezuela)
10 July 2004
19:45

Argentina	0–1	Mexico
	Report	Morales 8'

Estadio Elías Aguirre, Chiclayo
Attendance: 25,000
Referee: Márcio Rezende (Brazil)

13 July 2004
17:30

Mexico	2–1	Ecuador
Altamirano 23' (pen.); Bautista 42'	Report	Delgado 71'

Estadio Miguel Grau, Piura
Attendance: 21,000
Referee: Eduardo Lecca (Peru)
13 July 2004
19:45

Argentina	4–2	Uruguay
K. González 19' (pen.); Figueroa 20', 89'; Ayala 80'	Report	Estoyanoff 7'; Sánchez 38'

Estadio Miguel Grau, Piura
Attendance: 24,000
Referee: Rubén Selman (Chile)

=== Group C ===
Team	Pld	W	D	L	GF	GA	GD	Pts
Paraguay	3	2	1	0	4	2	+2	7
Brazil	3	2	0	1	6	3	+3	6
Costa Rica	3	1	0	2	3	6	−3	3
Chile	3	0	1	2	2	4	−2	1

8 July 2004
17:30

Costa Rica	0–1	Paraguay
	Report	Dos Santos 85' (pen.)

Estadio Arequipa, Arequipa
Attendance: 30,000
Referee: Óscar Ruiz (Colombia)
8 July 2004
19:45

Brazil	1–0	Chile
Luís Fabiano 90'	Report

Estadio Arequipa, Arequipa
Attendance: 35,000
Referee: Marco Antonio Rodríguez (Mexico)

11 July 2004
15:00

Brazil	4–1	Costa Rica
Adriano 45', 54', 67'; Juan 49'	Report	Marín 81'

Estadio Arequipa, Arequipa
Attendance: 12,000
Referee: Héctor Baldassi (Argentina)
11 July 2004
17:15

Paraguay	1–1	Chile
Cristaldo 78'	Report	González 71'

Estadio Arequipa, Arequipa
Attendance: 15,000
Referee: Gustavo Méndez (Uruguay)

14 July 2004
17:30

Costa Rica	2–1	Chile
Wright 60'; Herron 90'	Report	Olarra 40'

Estadio Jorge Basadre, Tacna
Attendance: 20,000
Referee: René Ortubé (Bolivia)
14 July 2004
19:45

Brazil	1–2	Paraguay
Luís Fabiano 35'	Report	González 29'; Bareiro 71'

Estadio Arequipa, Arequipa
Attendance: 8,000
Referee: Gilberto Hidalgo (Peru)

=== Ranking of third-placed teams ===
At the end of the first stage, a comparison was made between the third-placed teams of each group. The two best third-placed teams advanced to the quarterfinals.

Grp	Team	Pld	W	D	L	GF	GA	GD	Pts
B	Uruguay	3	1	1	1	6	7	−1	4
C	Costa Rica	3	1	0	2	3	6	−3	3
A	Bolivia	3	0	2	1	3	4	−1	2

== Knockout stage ==
=== Bracket ===
Quarter-finals
17 July – Chiclayo
Peru	0
Argentina	1
17 July – Trujillo
Colombia	2
Costa Rica	0
18 July – Piura
Mexico	0
Brazil	4
18 July – Tacna
Paraguay	1
Uruguay	3

Semi-finals
20 July – Lima
Argentina	3
Colombia	0
21 July – Lima
Brazil (p)	1 (5)
Uruguay	1 (3)

Final
25 July – Lima
Argentina	2 (2)
Brazil (p)	2 (4)
Third place
24 July – Cuzco
Colombia	1
Uruguay	2

=== Quarter-finals ===
17 July 2004
17:00

Peru	0–1	Argentina
	Report	Tevez 60'

Estadio Elías Aguirre, Chiclayo
Attendance: 25,000
Referee: Carlos Amarilla (Paraguay)

17 July 2004
19:45

Colombia	2–0	Costa Rica
Aguilar 41'; Moreno 45'	Report

Estadio Mansiche, Trujillo
Attendance: 18,000
Referee: Gustavo Méndez (Uruguay)

18 July 2004
15:00

Paraguay	1–3	Uruguay
Gamarra 15'	Report	Bueno 40' (pen.); Silva 65', 88'

Estadio Jorge Basadre, Tacna
Attendance: 20,000
Referee: Héctor Baldassi (Argentina)

18 July 2004
20:30

Mexico	0–4	Brazil
	Report	Alex 26' (pen.); Adriano 65', 78'; Oliveira 87'

Estadio Miguel Grau, Piura
Attendance: 22,000
Referee: Óscar Ruiz (Colombia)

=== Semi-finals ===
20 July 2004
19:45

Argentina	3–0	Colombia
Tevez 33'; L. González 50'; Sorín 80'	Report

Estadio Nacional, Lima
Attendance: 22,000
Referee: Gilberto Hidalgo (Peru)

21 July 2004
19:45

Brazil	1–1	Uruguay
Adriano 46'	Report	Sosa 22'
Penalties
Luisão (penalty scored); Luís Fabiano (penalty scored); Adriano (penalty scored); Renato (penalty scored); Alex (penalty scored)	5–3	(penalty scored) Silva; (penalty scored) Viera; (penalty scored) Pouso; (penalty missed) Sánchez

Estadio Nacional, Lima
Attendance: 10,000
Referee: Marco Rodríguez (Mexico)

=== Third-place match ===
24 July 2004
19:45

Colombia	1–2	Uruguay
Herrera 70' (pen.)	Report	Estoyanoff 2'; Sánchez 80'

Estadio Garcilaso, Cuzco
Attendance: 35,000
Referee: René Ortubé (Bolivia)

=== Final ===
25 July 2004
15:00

Argentina	2–2	Brazil
K. González 20' (pen.); Delgado 87'	Report	Luisão 45'; Adriano 90+3'
Penalties
D'Alessandro (penalty missed); Heinze (penalty missed); K. González (penalty scored); Sorín (penalty scored)	2–4	(penalty scored) Adriano; (penalty scored) Edu; (penalty scored) Diego; (penalty scored) Juan

Estadio Nacional, Lima
Attendance: 43,000
Referee: Carlos Amarilla (Paraguay)

== Result ==
2004 Copa América Champions

Brazil
Seventh title

== Goalscorers ==
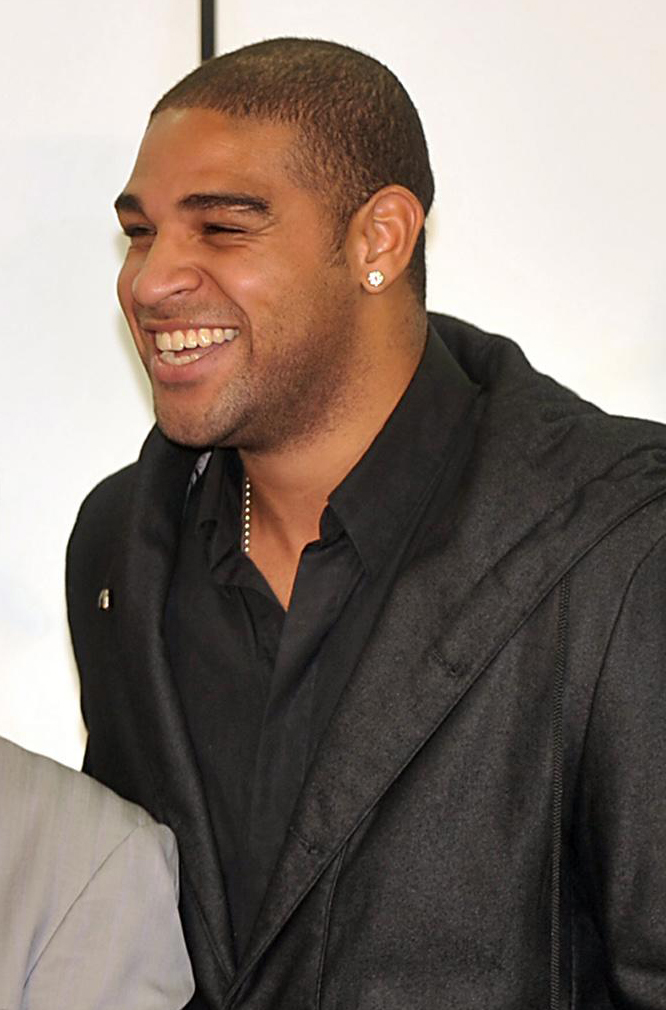
Adriano, top scorer

With seven goals, Adriano was the top scorer in the tournament. There were 78 goals scored in 26 matches, for an average of 3 goals per match.

7 goals

- (Brazil) Adriano

3 goals

- (Argentina) Kily González
- (Argentina) Javier Saviola
- (Uruguay) Carlos Bueno

2 goals

- (Argentina) Luciano Figueroa
- (Argentina) Lucho González
- (Argentina) Carlos Tevez
- (Colombia) Abel Aguilar
- (Colombia) Tressor Moreno
- (Brazil) Luís Fabiano
- (Ecuador) Agustín Delgado
- (Peru) Nolberto Solano
- (Uruguay) Fabián Estoyanoff
- (Uruguay) Vicente Sánchez
- (Uruguay) Darío Silva

1 goal

- (Argentina) Roberto Ayala
- (Argentina) Andrés D'Alessandro
- (Argentina) César Delgado
- (Argentina) Juan Pablo Sorín
- (Bolivia) Lorgio Álvarez
- (Bolivia) Joaquín Botero
- (Bolivia) Gonzalo Galindo
- (Brazil) Alex
- (Brazil) Juan
- (Brazil) Luisão
- (Brazil) Ricardo Oliveira
- (Chile) Sebastián González
- (Chile) Rafael Olarra
- (Colombia) Edwin Congo
- (Colombia) Sergio Herrera
- (Colombia) Edixon Perea
- (Costa Rica) Andy Herron
- (Costa Rica) Luis Marín
- (Costa Rica) Mauricio Wright
- (Ecuador) Franklin Salas
- (Mexico) Héctor Altamirano
- (Mexico) Adolfo Bautista
- (Mexico) Ramón Morales
- (Mexico) Ricardo Osorio
- (Mexico) Pável Pardo
- (Paraguay) Fredy Bareiro
- (Paraguay) Ernesto Cristaldo
- (Paraguay) Julio dos Santos
- (Paraguay) Carlos Gamarra
- (Paraguay) Julio González
- (Peru) Santiago Acasiete
- (Peru) Jefferson Farfán
- (Peru) Flavio Maestri
- (Peru) Roberto Palacios
- (Peru) Claudio Pizarro
- (Uruguay) Diego Forlán
- (Uruguay) Paolo Montero
- (Uruguay) Marcelo Sosa
- (Venezuela) Massimo Margiotta
- (Venezuela) Ruberth Morán

== Awards ==
- Most valuable player: (Brazil) Adriano
- Top goalscorer: (Brazil) Adriano (7 goals)

=== Team of the tournament ===
The All-Tournament Team was selected by the CONMEBOL Technical Study Group.

Goalkeeper	Defenders	Midfielders	Forwards
(Brazil) Júlio César	(Argentina) Javier Zanetti (Argentina) Roberto Ayala (Brazil) Juan (Uruguay) Darío Rodríguez	(Argentina) Lucho González (Mexico) Pável Pardo (Brazil) Renato (Brazil) Alex	(Argentina) Carlos Tevez (Brazil) Adriano

== Marketing ==
=== Mascot ===
The official mascot of the tournament was known as Chasqui. He was based on the Incan messengers of the same name.

=== Sponsorship ===
Global platinum sponsor

- Petrobras
- LG

Global gold sponsor

- América Móvil (Telcel & Telmex are the brands advertised)
- LAN Airlines

Global silver sponsor

- Anheuser-Busch InBev (Corona (beer) is the brand advertised)
- PepsiCo (Pepsi and Gatorade are the brands advertised)
- 51 (brand)
- Volkswagen

Official Supplier

- Tolteca

=== Theme songs ===
- "Más Allá de los Sueños" by Peruvian singer-songwriter Gian Marco was the official theme song for the tournament. The song was well received and became popular in Latin America but mostly in Perú. Despite it being the official tournament theme song, Gian Marco was unable to perform it during the closing ceremony due to him being on tour at that time.
- "La Copa Será Tuya Al Final" by Betzaida was used by Univision as their theme song.
