= 2005 FIFA Confederations Cup =

7th FIFA Confederations Cup, held in Germany

Konföderationen-Pokal 2005

Tournament details
- Host country: Germany
- Dates: 15–29 June
- Teams: 8 (from 6 confederations)
- Venues: 5 (in 5 host cities)

Final positions
- Champions: Brazil (2nd title)
- Runners-up: Argentina
- Third place: Germany
- Fourth place: Mexico

Tournament statistics
- Matches played: 16
- Goals scored: 56 (3.5 per match)
- Attendance: 603,106 (37,694 per match)
- Top scorer: (Brazil) Adriano (5 goals)
- Best player: (Brazil) Adriano
- Fair play award: Greece

The 2005 FIFA Confederations Cup football tournament was the seventh FIFA Confederations Cup. It was held in Germany between 15 June and 29 June 2005, as a prelude to the 2006 FIFA World Cup. The tournament was won by 2002 FIFA World Cup and 2004 Copa América winners Brazil, who defeated Argentina 4–1 in the final at the Waldstadion in Frankfurt. The final was a rematch of the 2004 Copa América final, which was also won by Brazil. It was Brazil's second win at the Confederations Cup. After winning the 2005 tournament, the 2002 FIFA World Cup and 2004 Copa América, Brazil became the first country to be the reigning World Cup champions, Confederations Cup champions, and continental champions twice, having previously achieved this feat in 1997 when they won the 1994 FIFA World Cup, the 1997 Copa América, and 1997 FIFA Confederations Cup.

== Qualified teams ==
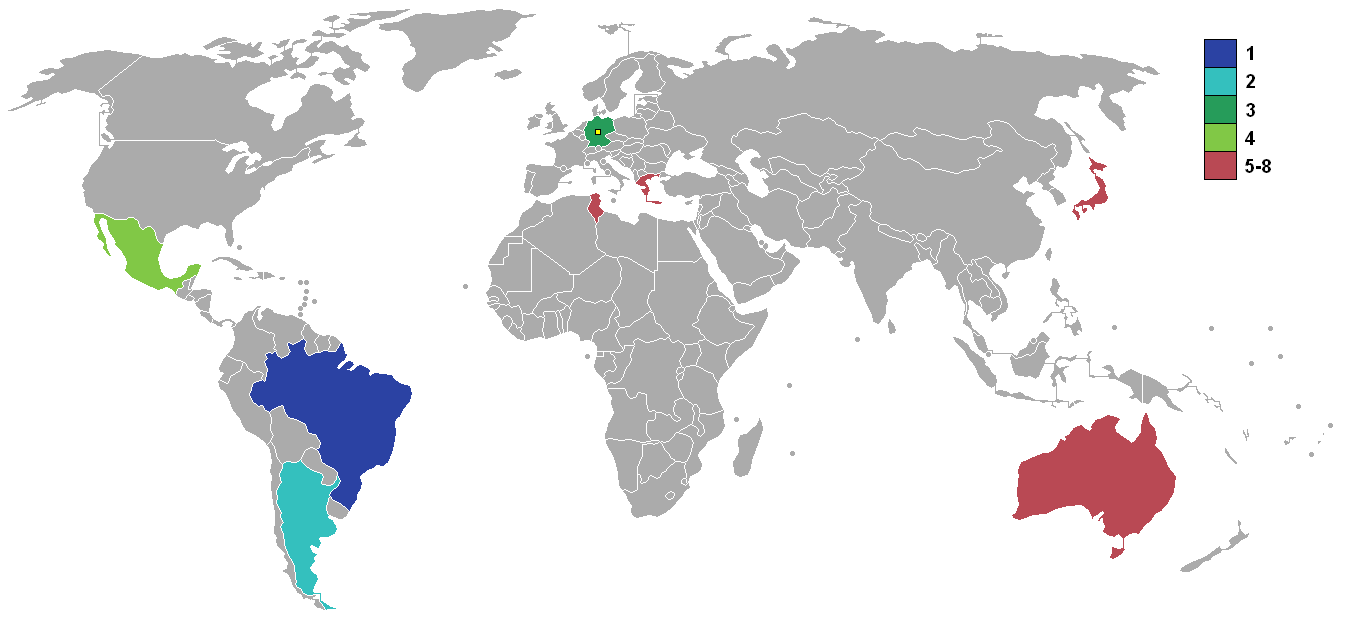
2005 FIFA Confederations Cup participating teams

Team	Confederation	Qualification method	Date qualification secured	Participation no.
Germany	UEFA	Hosts	7 July 2000	2nd
Brazil	CONMEBOL	2002 FIFA World Cup winners	30 June 2002	5th
Mexico	CONCACAF	2003 CONCACAF Gold Cup winners	27 July 2003	5th
Tunisia	CAF	2004 African Cup of Nations winners	14 February 2004	1st
Greece	UEFA	UEFA Euro 2004 winners	4 July 2004	1st
Argentina	CONMEBOL	2004 Copa América runners-up (Note: Argentina were awarded a spot in the competition because Brazil had won both the 2002 FIFA World Cup and the 2004 Copa América. Since both competitions award their winners a place in the Confederations Cup, the runners-up in the Copa América 2004 were called to play.)	21 July 2004	3rd
Japan	AFC	2004 AFC Asian Cup winners	7 August 2004	4th
Australia	OFC	2004 OFC Nations Cup winners	12 October 2004	3rd

== Venues ==
2005 FIFA Confederations Cup is located in Germany		Frankfurt
2005 FIFA Confederations Cup is located in Germany		Commerzbank-Arena (Waldstadion)
2005 FIFA Confederations Cup is located in Germany		50°4′6.86″N 8°38′43.65″E
2005 FIFA Confederations Cup is located in Germany		Capacity: 48,132
2005 FIFA Confederations Cup is located in Germany		Cologne
2005 FIFA Confederations Cup is located in Germany		RheinEnergieStadion (FIFA World Cup Stadium, Cologne)
2005 FIFA Confederations Cup is located in Germany		50°56′0.59″N 6°52′29.99″E
2005 FIFA Confederations Cup is located in Germany		Capacity: 46,120
Hanover	Leipzig	Nuremberg
AWD-Arena (FIFA World Cup Stadium, Hanover)	Zentralstadion	Frankenstadion
52°21′36.24″N 9°43′52.31″E	51°20′44.86″N 12°20′53.59″E	49°25′34″N 11°7′33″E
Capacity: 44,652	Capacity: 44,200	Capacity: 41,926

Originally, Kaiserslautern's Fritz-Walter-Stadion was also intended as a venue. However, on 27 May 2004, city authorities withdrew from the bidding process, citing added costs to complete the stadium on time as the reason for the withdrawal.

All five venues were reused for the 2006 FIFA World Cup.

== Match ball ==
The official match ball for the 2005 FIFA Confederations Cup was the Adidas Pelias 2.

== Match officials ==
Confederation	Referee	Assistants
AFC	Shamsul Maidin (Singapore)	Prachya Permpanich (Thailand); Bengech Allaberdyev (Turkmenistan)
CAF	Mourad Daami (Tunisia)	Taoufik Adjengui (Tunisia); Ali Tomusange (Uganda)
CONCACAF	Peter Prendergast (Jamaica)	Anthony Garwood (Jamaica); Joseph Taylor (Trinidad and Tobago)
CONMEBOL	Carlos Chandía (Chile)	Cristian Julio (Chile); Mario Vargas (Chile)
CONMEBOL	Carlos Amarilla (Paraguay)	Amelio Andino (Paraguay); Manuel Bernal (Paraguay)
OFC	Matthew Breeze (Australia)	Matthew Cream (Australia); Jim Ouliaris (Australia)
UEFA	Herbert Fandel (Germany)	Carsten Kadach (Germany); Volker Wezel (Germany)
UEFA	Roberto Rosetti (Italy)	Alessandro Griselli (Italy); Cristiano Copelli (Italy)
UEFA	Ľuboš Micheľ (Slovakia)	Roman Slyško (Slovakia); Martin Balko (Slovakia)

== Group stage ==
=== Group A ===
Pos	Team	Pld	W	D	L	GF	GA	GD	Pts	Qualification
1	Germany (H)	3	2	1	0	9	5	+4	7	Advance to knockout stage
2	Argentina	3	2	1	0	8	5	+3	7	Advance to knockout stage
3	Tunisia	3	1	0	2	3	5	−2	3	
4	Australia	3	0	0	3	5	10	−5	0	

(H) Hosts
15 June 2005
18:00

Argentina	2–1	Tunisia
Riquelme 33' (pen.); Saviola 57'	Report	Guemamdia 72' (pen.)

RheinEnergieStadion, Cologne
Attendance: 28,033
Referee: Roberto Rosetti (Italy)
15 June 2005
21:00

Germany	4–3	Australia
Kurányi 17'; Mertesacker 23'; Ballack 60' (pen.); Podolski 88'	Report	Skoko 21'; Aloisi 31', 90+2'

Waldstadion, Frankfurt
Attendance: 46,466
Referee: Carlos Amarilla (Paraguay)

18 June 2005
18:00

Tunisia	0–3	Germany
	Report	Ballack 74' (pen.); Schweinsteiger 80'; Hanke 88'

RheinEnergieStadion, Cologne
Attendance: 44,377
Referee: Peter Prendergast (Jamaica)
18 June 2005
20:45

Australia	2–4	Argentina
Aloisi 61' (pen.), 70'	Report	Figueroa 12', 53', 89'; Riquelme 31' (pen.)

Frankenstadion, Nuremberg
Attendance: 25,618
Referee: Shamsul Maidin (Singapore)

21 June 2005
20:45

Australia	0–2	Tunisia
	Report	Santos 26', 70'

Zentralstadion, Leipzig
Attendance: 23,952
Referee: Carlos Chandía (Chile)
21 June 2005
20:45

Argentina	2–2	Germany
Riquelme 33'; Cambiasso 74'	Report	Kurányi 29'; Asamoah 51'

Frankenstadion, Nuremberg
Attendance: 42,088
Referee: Ľuboš Micheľ (Slovakia)

=== Group B ===
Pos	Team	Pld	W	D	L	GF	GA	GD	Pts	Qualification
1	Mexico	3	2	1	0	3	1	+2	7	Advance to knockout stage
2	Brazil	3	1	1	1	5	3	+2	4	Advance to knockout stage
3	Japan	3	1	1	1	4	4	0	4	
4	Greece	3	0	1	2	0	4	−4	1	

16 June 2005
18:00

Japan	1–2	Mexico
Yanagisawa 12'	Report	Sinha 39'; Fonseca 64'

Stadium Hanover, Hanover
Attendance: 24,036
Referee: Matthew Breeze (Australia)
16 June 2005
20:45

Brazil	3–0	Greece
Adriano 41'; Robinho 46'; Juninho 81'	Report

Zentralstadion, Leipzig
Attendance: 42,507
Referee: Ľuboš Micheľ (Slovakia)

19 June 2005
18:00

Greece	0–1	Japan
	Report	Oguro 76'

Waldstadion, Frankfurt
Attendance: 34,314
Referee: Herbert Fandel (Germany)
19 June 2005
20:45

Mexico	1–0	Brazil
Borgetti 59'	Report

Stadium Hanover, Hanover
Attendance: 43,677
Referee: Roberto Rosetti (Italy)

22 June 2005
20:45

Greece	0–0	Mexico
	Report

Waldstadion, Frankfurt
Attendance: 31,285
Referee: Carlos Amarilla (Paraguay)
22 June 2005
20:45

Japan	2–2	Brazil
Nakamura 27'; Oguro 88'	Report	Robinho 10'; Ronaldinho 32'

RheinEnergieStadion, Cologne
Attendance: 44,922
Referee: Mourad Daami (Tunisia)

== Knockout stage ==
Semi-finals
25 June – Nuremberg
Germany	2
Brazil	3
26 June – Hanover
Mexico	1 (5)
Argentina (p)	1 (6)

Final
29 June – Frankfurt
Brazil	4
Argentina	1
Third place
29 June – Leipzig
Germany (a.e.t.)	4
Mexico	3

=== Semi-finals ===
25 June 2005
18:00 CEST

Germany	2–3	Brazil
Podolski 23'; Ballack 45+3' (pen.)	Report	Adriano 21', 76'; Ronaldinho 43' (pen.)

Frankenstadion, Nuremberg
Attendance: 42,187
Referee: Carlos Chandía (Chile)

26 June 2005
18:00 CEST

Mexico	1–1 (a.e.t.)	Argentina
Salcido 104'	Report	Figueroa 110'
Penalties
Pérez (penalty scored); Pardo (penalty scored); Borgetti (penalty scored); Salcido (penalty scored); Pineda (penalty scored); Osorio (penalty missed)	5–6	(penalty scored) Riquelme; (penalty scored) Rodríguez; (penalty scored) Aimar; (penalty scored) Galletti; (penalty scored) Sorín; (penalty scored) Cambiasso

AWD-Arena, Hanover
Attendance: 40,718
Referee: Roberto Rosetti (Italy)

=== Third place play-off ===
29 June 2005
18:00 CEST

Germany	4–3 (a.e.t.)	Mexico
Podolski 37'; Schweinsteiger 41'; Huth 79'; Ballack 97'	Report	Fonseca 40'; Borgetti 58', 85'

Zentralstadion, Leipzig
Attendance: 43,335
Referee: Matthew Breeze (Australia)

=== Final ===
29 June 2005
20:45 CEST

Brazil	4–1	Argentina
Adriano 11', 63'; Kaká 16'; Ronaldinho 47'	Report	Aimar 65'

Waldstadion, Frankfurt
Attendance: 45,591
Referee: Ľuboš Micheľ (Slovakia)

== Awards ==
Golden Ball	Golden Shoe
(Brazil) Adriano	(Brazil) Adriano
Silver Ball	Silver Shoe
(Argentina) Juan Román Riquelme	(Germany) Michael Ballack
Bronze Ball	Bronze Shoe
(Brazil) Ronaldinho	(Australia) John Aloisi
FIFA Fair Play Trophy
Greece

Source: FIFA

== Statistics ==
=== Goalscorers ===
Adriano received the Golden Shoe award for scoring five goals. In total, 56 goals were scored by 29 players, with none credited as own goals.

5 goals

- (Brazil) Adriano

4 goals

- (Argentina) Luciano Figueroa
- (Australia) John Aloisi
- (Germany) Michael Ballack

3 goals

- (Argentina) Juan Román Riquelme
- (Brazil) Ronaldinho
- (Germany) Lukas Podolski
- (Mexico) Jared Borgetti

2 goals

- (Brazil) Robinho
- (Germany) Kevin Kurányi
- (Germany) Bastian Schweinsteiger
- (Japan) Masashi Oguro
- (Mexico) Francisco Fonseca
- (Tunisia) Francileudo Santos

1 goal

- (Argentina) Pablo Aimar
- (Argentina) Esteban Cambiasso
- (Argentina) Javier Saviola
- (Australia) Josip Skoko
- (Brazil) Kaká
- (Brazil) Juninho
- (Germany) Gerald Asamoah
- (Germany) Mike Hanke
- (Germany) Robert Huth
- (Germany) Per Mertesacker
- (Japan) Shunsuke Nakamura
- (Japan) Atsushi Yanagisawa
- (Mexico) Carlos Salcido
- (Mexico) Sinha
- (Tunisia) Haykel Guemamdia

=== Tournament ranking ===
Per statistical convention in football, matches decided in extra time are counted as wins and losses, while matches decided by penalty shoot-outs are counted as draws.

Pos	Grp	Team	Pld	W	D	L	GF	GA	GD	Pts	Final result
1	B	Brazil	5	3	1	1	12	6	+6	10	Champions
2	A	Argentina	5	2	2	1	10	10	0	8	Runners-up
3	A	Germany (H)	5	3	1	1	15	11	+4	10	Third place
4	B	Mexico	5	2	2	1	7	6	+1	8	Fourth place
5	B	Japan	3	1	1	1	4	4	0	4	Eliminated in group stage
6	A	Tunisia	3	1	0	2	3	5	−2	3	Eliminated in group stage
7	B	Greece	3	0	1	2	0	4	−4	1	Eliminated in group stage
8	A	Australia	3	0	0	3	5	10	−5	0	Eliminated in group stage

Source: FIFA
(H) Hosts
