= Belmácio Pousa Godinho =

Brazilian soccer player and musician

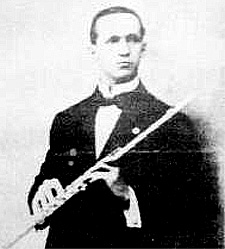
- Belmácio with his flute

Personal information
- Full name: Belmácio Pousa de Toledo Godinho
- Date of birth: 27 May 1892
- Place of birth: Piracicaba, São Paulo, Brazil
- Date of death: 21 February 1980 (aged 87)
- Place of death: Ribeirão Preto, São Paulo, Brazil
- Positions: Right winger; forward

Youth career
- 1913: EC Vergueirense
- 1913: XV de Piracicaba

Senior career*
Years	Team	Apps	(Gls)
1913–1917	XV de Piracicaba		
1917–?	Comercial FC		
- * Club domestic league appearances and goals

Belmácio Pousa de Toledo Godinho (May 27, 1892 — February 21, 1980) was a Brazilian football player, musician, and businessman. He is considered one of the legends of Comercial Futebol Clube, based in Ribeirão Preto, in the interior of São Paulo.

== Biography ==
=== First years ===
Belmácio was born on May 27, 1892, in the city of Piracicaba, in the interior of the state of São Paulo. He was the second of nine siblings, born to a Spaniards father, Severino Pousa Fernandes, who worked as a bricklayer, and a Portuguese mother, Maria Pousa Godinho, who worked as a seamstress. He received his first flute from an aunt when he was still a child, and learned his first melodies from one of his brothers.

He graduated as an elementary school teacher from the Piracicaba Normal School in 1914. But despite his training, he stood out in his youth as a football player. Belmácio played right wing and forward, and he was a very good player. He received his first professional flute from a musician and friend named Patápio Silva, who had brought the instrument back from Italy.

In 1913, the Belmácio family ran Esporte Clube Vergueirense, an amateur soccer team in the city of Piracicaba. On November 15 of that same year, his family finalized the merger of EC Vergueirense with another amateur team in the city, 12 de Outubro, led by another traditional Piracicaba family, the Guerrini family. This merger gave rise to Esporte Clube XV de Novembro, which would become known as XV de Piracicaba.

=== Football ===
In 1917, he left Piracicaba for Ribeirão Preto, also in the interior of São Paulo, where he taught at the Segundo Grupo Escolar de Ribeirão Preto and at the Escola Reunidas, in Bonfim Paulista, a district of the municipality. On July 14, 1917, Belmácio was signed to play for the Comercial Futebol Clube of Ribeirão Preto.

When he arrived in Ribeirão Preto on July 14, 1917, he was not only welcomed by the board of directors of the Commercial but also greeted by the Sociedade Legião Brazileira (a philanthropic group of Ribeirão Preto's high society, whose name was spelled this way), where he was able to play some of his own compositions during the celebration. As a player for Commercial, Belmácio was runner-up in the 1919 Campeonato Paulista, APEA Interior Division, and was also part of the Commercial team that toured the northern and northeastern regions of Brazil in April 1920, earning Commercial the title of “Leão do Norte” (Lion of the North).

=== Music and Business ===
Belmácio Pousa Godinho
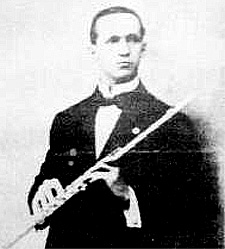
- Belmácio with his flute

Background information
- Born: 27 May 1892; Piracicaba, São Paulo, Brazil
- Origin: Piracicaba, São Paulo, Brazil
- Died: 21 February 1980 (aged 87) Ribeirão Preto, São Paulo, Brasil
- Genres: Classical, maxixe, popular music, sertanejo, jingle, polka, mazurka, choro, march, waltz, foxtrot, schottische
- Occupations: Flautist, pianist, composer
- Instruments: Flute piano
- Years active: 1910–1980
- Formerly of: Orchestra Lozano

In addition to his career as a soccer player, he was involved in other activities, such as business and music. In 1919, he founded a store selling musical instruments and supplies called A Musical, which operated for more than 60 years on General Osório Street in downtown Ribeirão Preto. He was a serenader, played at liturgical celebrations, in revue and opera troupes, at school events, and with the “Orchestra Lozano.” He also had his own small orchestras that performed at graduation dances, civic gatherings, artistic events, and movie theaters, providing musical accompaniment for silent films.

He likely began publishing his compositions after 1910, and by 1916 his sheet music was already being advertised in newspapers. The Rio de Janeiro magazine O Malho published many of them. He composed country songs, advertising jingles, polkas, mazurkas, choros, dobrados, waltzes, foxtrots, and scottishes. His main songwriting partner was Benedito Gomes da Costa, a Portuguese language teacher.

The song O Mulatinho became internationally known through recordings by Gaó and his Orquestra Brasileira in the United States and by Roberto Inglez and his Orchestra in England. It was also recorded by major figures in Brazilian music, such as Dalva de Oliveira, Dante Santoro, and Hebe Camargo, as well as the Italian pianist Alberto Semprini. Belmácio also composed the music for the Comercial FC anthem, to which Daniel Amaral de Abreu later added lyrics.

In 1924, Belmácio became the exclusive representative and importer of Niendörf brand German pianos in the Ribeirão Preto region, and because of his sales success, the factory gave him a piano as a gift, on which the brand name had been replaced with his own name, engraved in gold.

He first became president of Comercial FC in 1955, when he replaced the incumbent Oscar de Moura Lacerda; however, he remained in the position for less than a year.

He returned to the position in 1957, where he remained until 1958, leading the club to the 1958 Campeonato Paulista Série A2 a victory that paved the way for the construction of a new stadium for the club; however, due to some setbacks and financial problems, the stadium was not actually built until between 1961 and 1964, and was named Estádio Palma Travassos.

== Personal life ==
He married Tanina Crisci Innechi in Ribeirão Preto. He was Catholic and a devotee of Saint Expeditus, the patron saint of athletes.

=== Death ===
He died on February 21, 1980, at the age of 87.

==== Legacy ====
In October 2023, a bandstand named in his honor was unveiled at Praça de XV de Novembro in downtown Ribeirão Preto. The ceremony was attended by Mayor Duarte Nogueira (PSDB), politicians, and the Grupo Choro da Casa, who paid tribute by performing Belmácio's compositions.

== Selected musical compositions ==
- Supremo Adeus: recorded by Alberto Calçada and His Band
- Ilusão que Morre: recorded by Alberto Calçada and His Band
- Suspiros e Lágrimas: recorded by Alberto Calçada and His Band
- Mar de Rosas: recorded by Alberto Calçada and His Band
- Jamais Voltarei: recorded by Alberto Calçada and His Band
- Ideal Desfeito: recorded by Alberto Calçada and His Band
- Dor Secreta: recorded by Alberto Calçada and His Band, Theodorico Soares, and the Poly Band.
- Saudades do Meu Velho Braz: recorded by Theodorico Soares and the Poly Band.
