= Bonfim =

Bonfim may refer to:

People:

- Éder José de Oliveira Bonfim (born 1981), Brazilian football player
- Bruno Bonfim (born 1979), middle-distance freestyle swimmer from Brazil
- Dante Bonfim Costa (born 1983), usually known simply as Dante, is a Brazilian football player
- Erick Flores Bonfim or simply Erick Flores (born 1989), Brazilian Attacking Midfielder
- Giovânio Bonfim, or simply Wando, (born 1963), former Brazilian football player
- José Travassos Valdez (1787–1862), Portuguese soldier and statesman
- Leandro do Bonfim (born 1984), Brazilian attacking midfielder

Locations:

- Bonfim, Roraima, municipality located in the mideast of the state of Roraima in Brazil
- Bonfim (Porto), Portuguese parish, located in the municipality of Porto
- Bonfim Paulista (São Paulo Bonfim), a district of the city of Ribeirão Preto, Brazil
- Roman Catholic Diocese of Bonfim, diocese in the city of Salvador, Bahia
- Bonfim, Minas Gerais, municipality in Brazil
- Bonfim (Carira), municipality in the state of Sergipe in Brazil

Buildings:

- Church of Nosso Senhor do Bonfim (Salvador), the most famous Catholic church in Salvador, Bahia, Brazil
- Estádio do Bonfim, multi-use stadium in Setúbal, Portugal
