= Alexandre Cajuru =

Brazilian footballer

Personal information
- Full name: Alexandre Rosa Paschoalato
- Date of birth: 12 July 1992 (age 34)
- Place of birth: Ribeirão Preto, Brazil
- Position: Goalkeeper

Youth career
- 2010–2012: Athletico Paranaense

Senior career*
Years	Team	Apps	(Gls)
2012–2016	Athletico Paranaense		
2013–2014	→ Ferroviária (loan)		
2015	→ Guaratinguetá (loan)		
2016	→ Ferroviária (loan)		
2017–2020	CSA		
2021	Jacuipense		
2022	Grêmio Anápolis		
2024	Paranoá		
- * Club domestic league appearances and goals as of 16 October 2023

Alexandre Rosa Paschoalato (born 12 July 1992), better known as Alexandre Cajuru, is a Brazilian professional footballer who plays as a goalkeeper.

== Career ==
Alexandre began his professional career at Athletico Paranaense. He has "Cajuru" in his name since he spent his childhood in the city of Cajuru, São Paulo. He played a few games in the Campeonato Paranaense and was loaned to Ferroviária and Guaratinguetá. In 2017 he was traded to CSA, the club where he won the 2017 Brasileiro Série C.

In 2022 he was hired by Grêmio Anápolis to compete in the Campeonato Goiano.

== Personal life ==
Alexandre is the son of the also goalkeeper Celso Paschoalato, who played for S.C. Farense for several years.

On 16 October 2023, he gained national notoriety by winning a case against Rede Globo, holder of football broadcasting rights in Brazil, for repeating on the Sportv channel's scheduling several times a blooper committed by Alexandre acting for CSA in the match against AA Ponte Preta, 21 August 2020, valid for 2020 Campeonato Brasileiro Série B. The court awarded Alexandre a compensation of R$ 30,000.

== Honours ==
CSA

- Campeonato Brasileiro Série C: 2017
- Campeonato Alagoano: 2018, 2019
