= Ribeirão Preto =

Municipality in São Paulo, Brazil

- Municipality
- Municipality of Ribeirão Preto
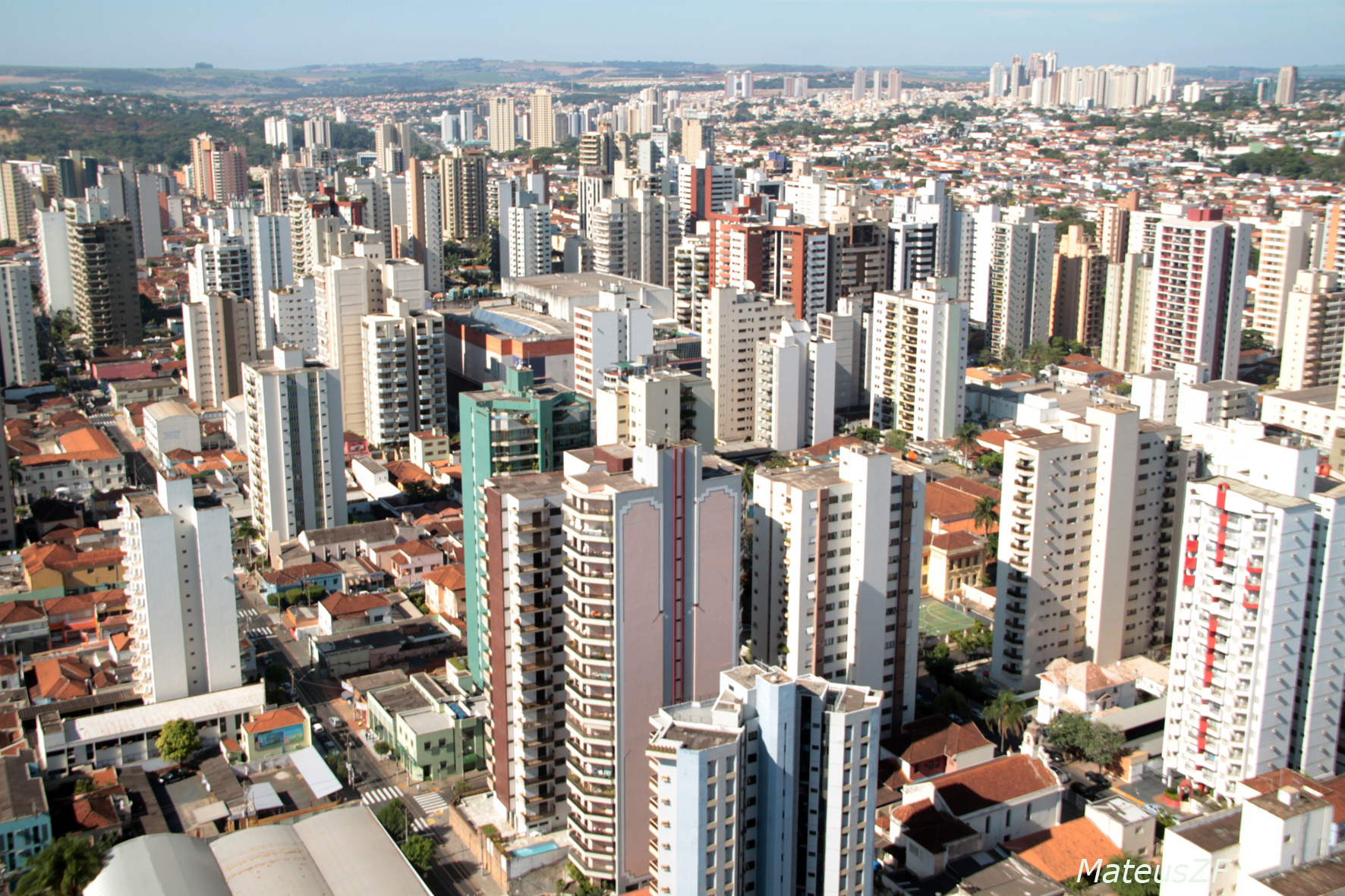
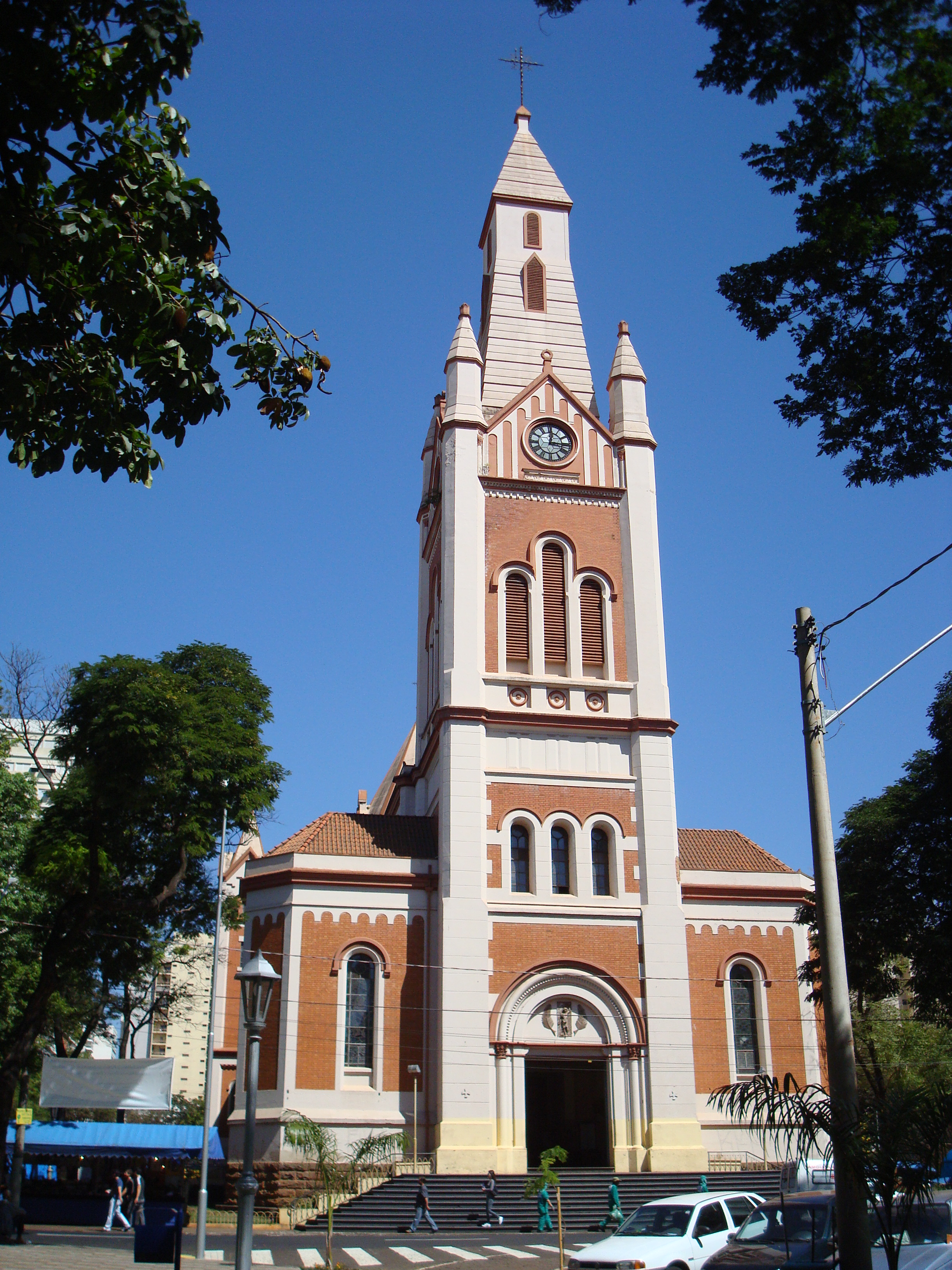
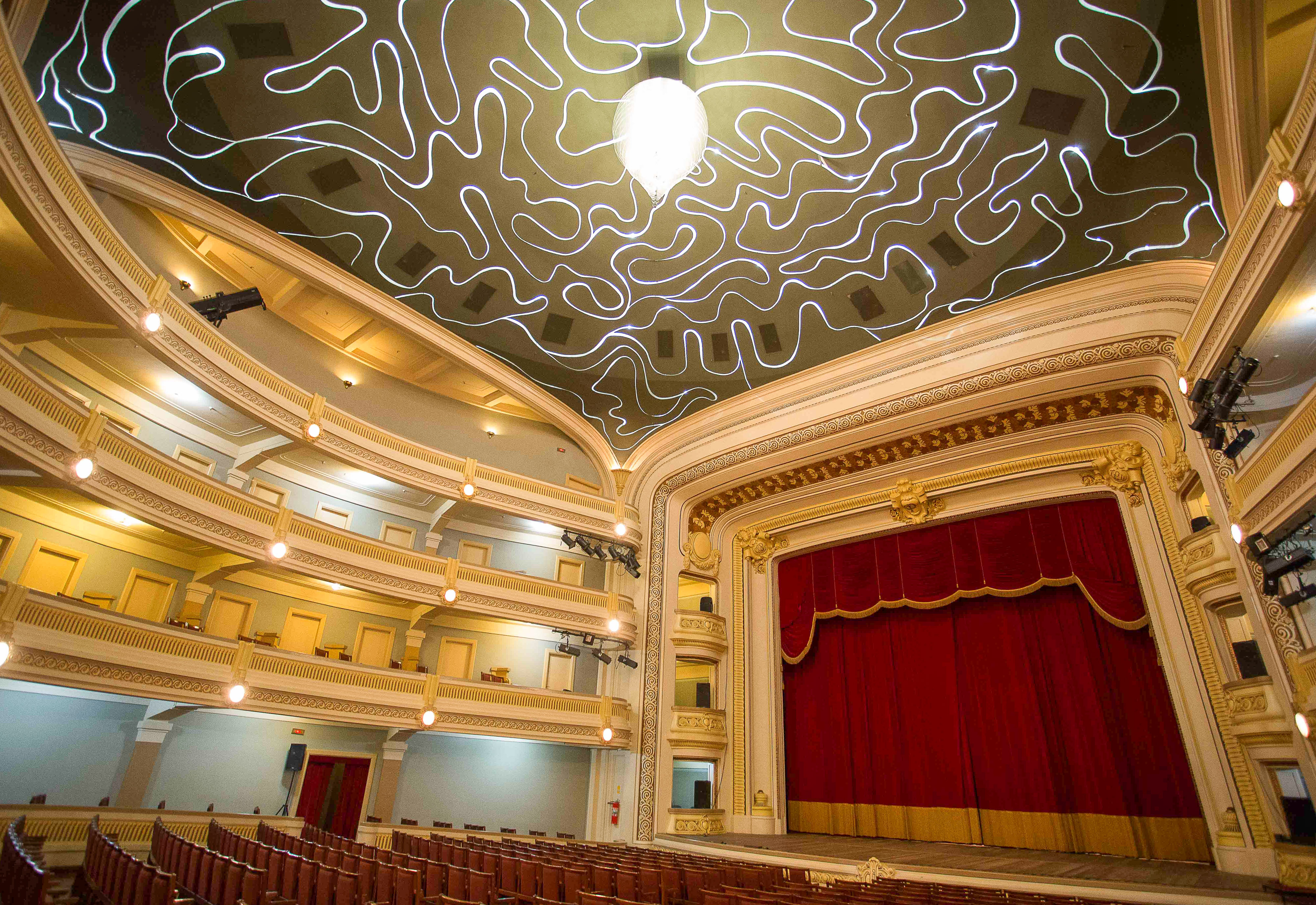
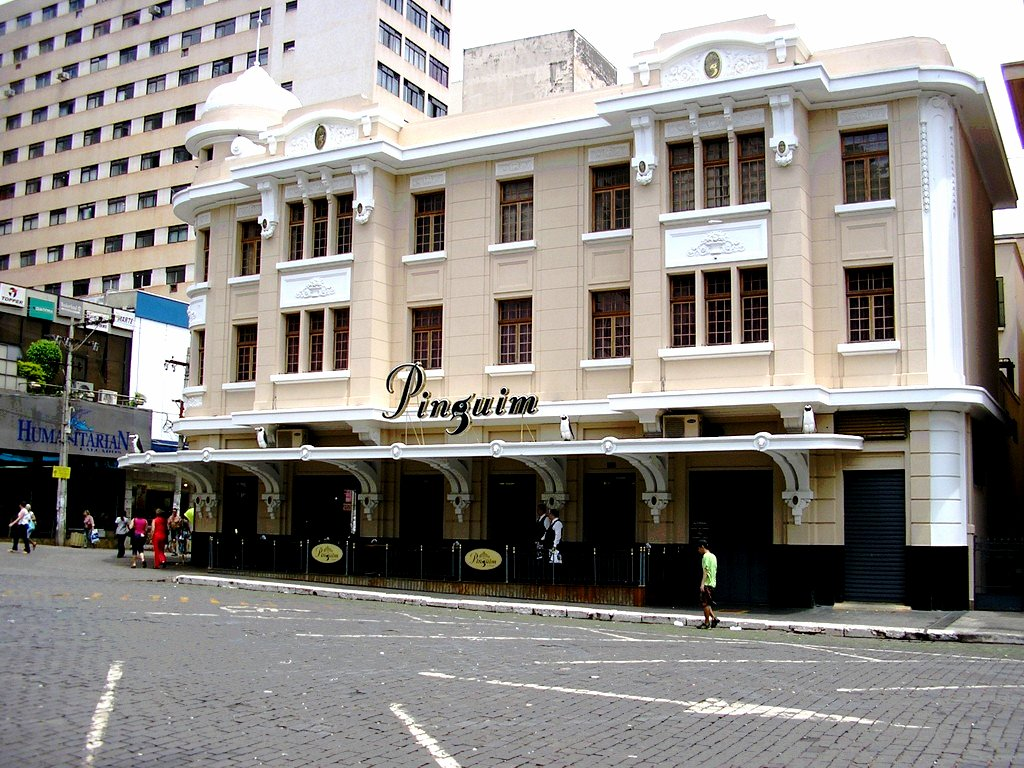
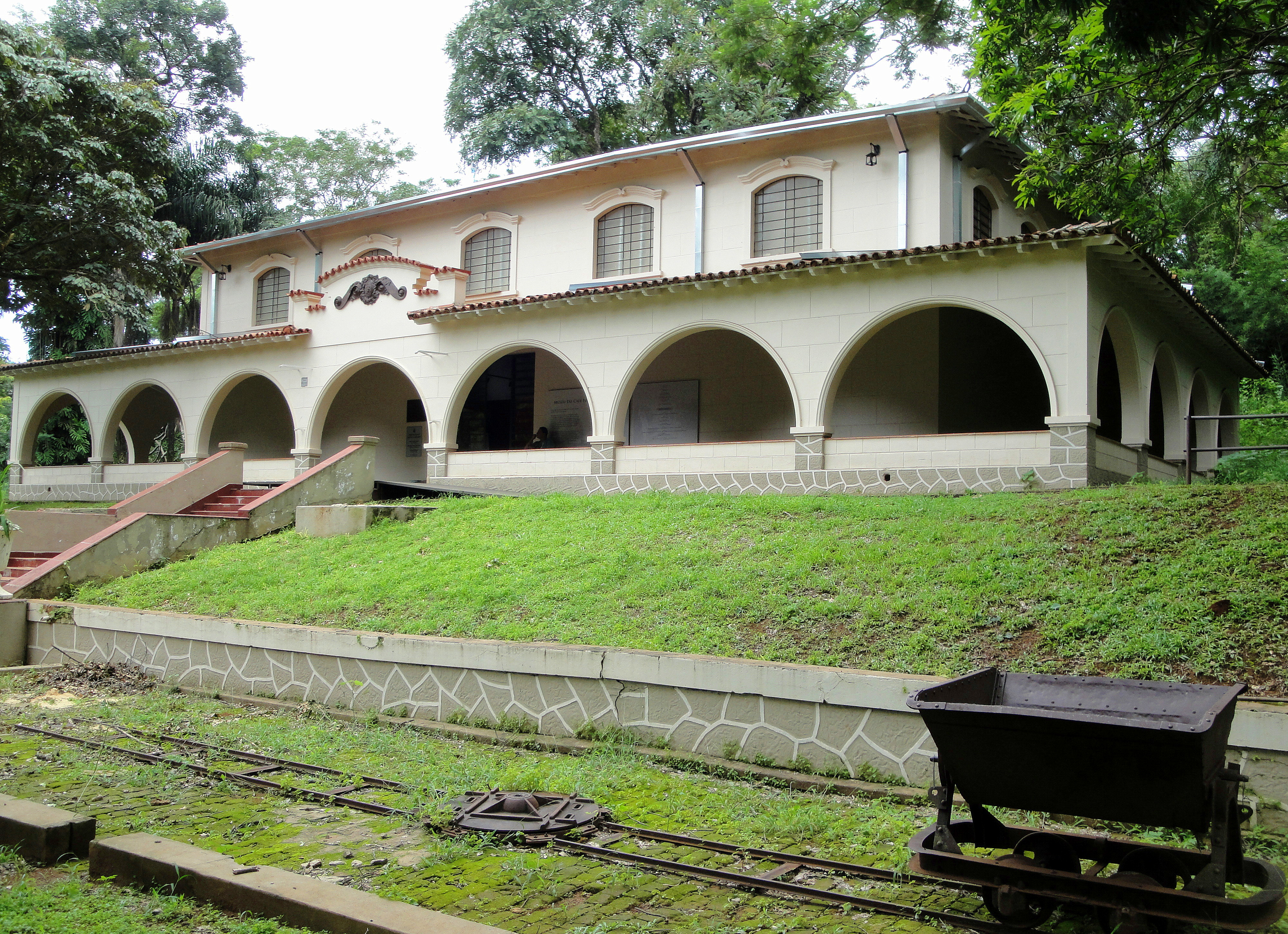
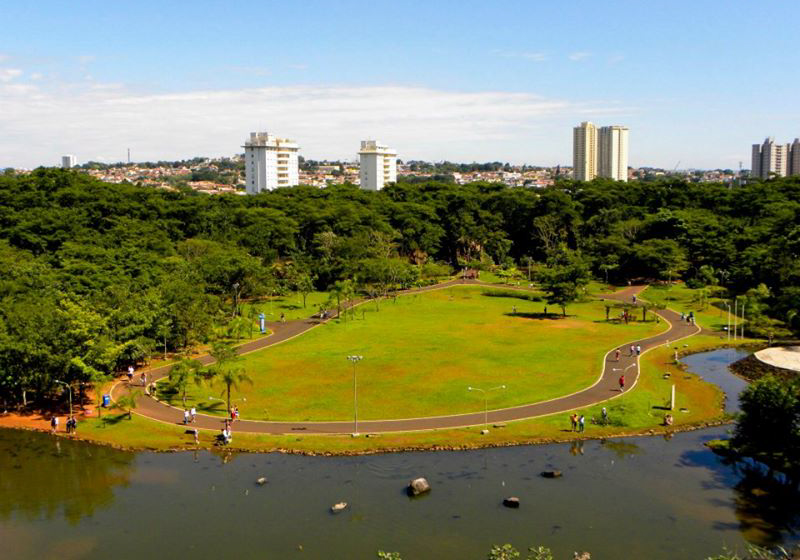
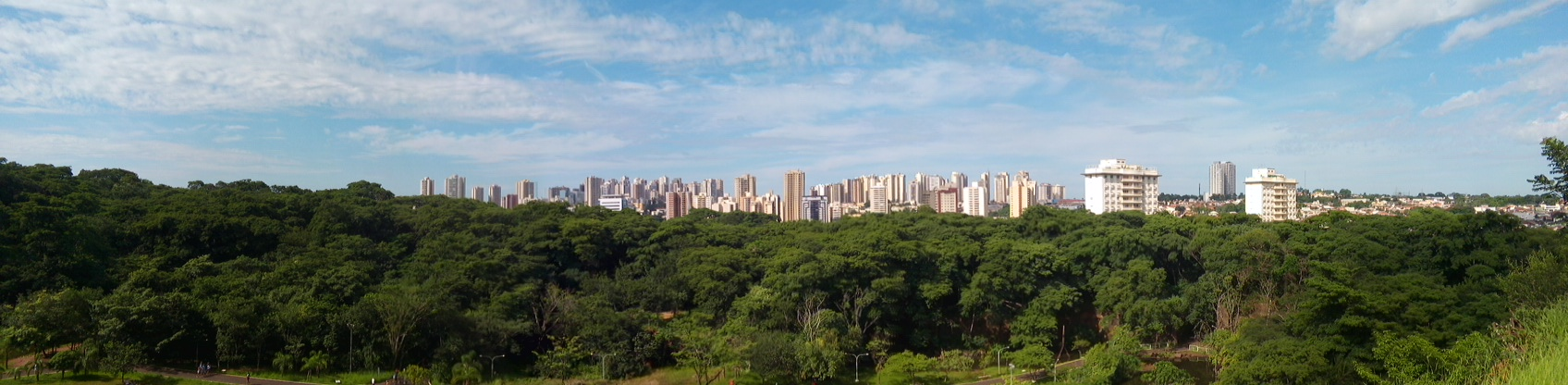
- From the top, from left to right: aerial view of downtown; Metropolitan Cathedral of Ribeirão Preto; interior of Theatro Pedro II; Choperia Penguin; Francisco Schmidt Coffee Museum; Mayor Luiz Roberto Jábali Park; partial panorama of the south zone of the city from Parque Prefeito Luiz Roberto Jábali.

- Flag Coat of arms
- Nickname: Capital Nacional do Agronegócio (Agribusiness National Capital) "California brasileira" ("Brazilian California")
- Motto: Bandeirantum Ager
- Location in São Paulo

- Location within Brazil
- Coordinates: 21°10′42″S 47°48′24″W
- Country: Brazil
- Region: Southeast
- State: São Paulo
- Founded: 19 June 1856

Government
  - Mayor: Ricardo Silva (PSD)

Area
  - Total: 650.9 km^{2} (251.3 sq mi)
- Elevation: 526 m (1,726 ft)

Population (2022)
  - Total: 698,642
  - Density: 1,073/km^{2} (2,780/sq mi)
- Postal Code: 14000-000
- Area code: +55 16
- HDI (2010): 0.800 – very high
- Website: ribeiraopreto.sp.gov.br

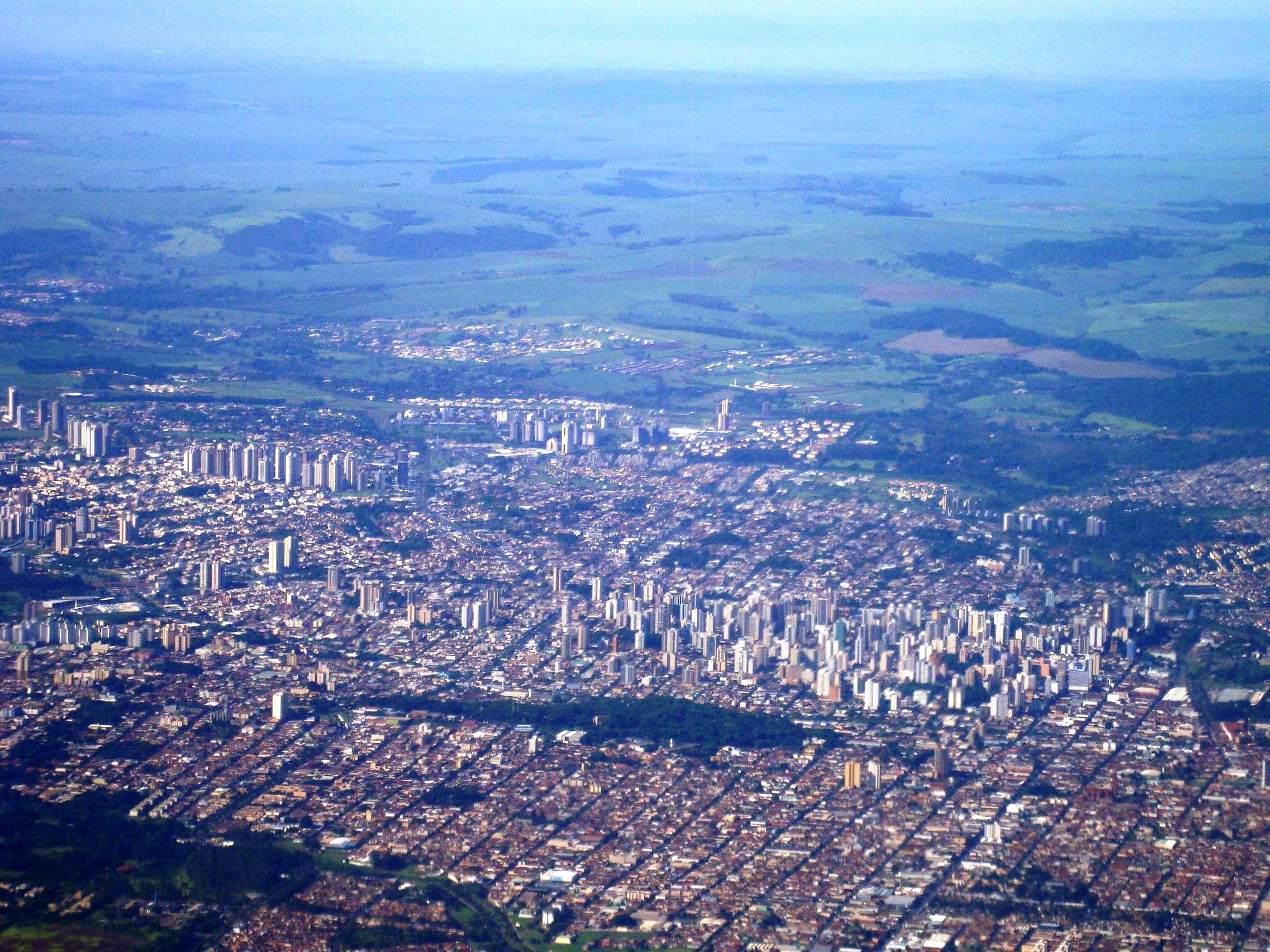
Aerial view of Ribeirão Preto in 2010

Ribeirão Preto (Portuguese pronunciation: [ʁibejˈɾɐ̃w ˈpɾetu]) is a city and a metropolitan area located in the northeastern region of São Paulo state, Brazil.

Ribeirão Preto is the eighth-largest municipality in the state, with an area of 650.9 km^{2} (251.3 mi^{2}). In 2021, the municipality proper had an estimated population of 720,216 and the wider metropolitan area had an estimated population of 1,178,910. It is located 313 km (194 mi) from the city of São Paulo and 706 km (439 mi) from Brasília, the federal capital. Its mean altitude is 526.8 m (1,728 ft) high. The city's average temperature throughout the year is 23 °C (73 °F), and the original predominant vegetation is the Atlantic Forest.

The city of Ribeirão Preto originated around 1856 as an agricultural region. Coffee was a primary source of income until 1929, when it lost value when compared with the industrial sector. In the second half of the 20th century, investment in health, biotechnology, bioenergy, and information technology led to the city being declared a Technological Center in 2010. These activities have caused the city to have the 30th-largest gross national product (GNP) in Brazil.

The city is also an important cultural center. Mayor Luiz Roberto Jábali Park, Maurilio Biagi Park, Carlos Raya Park, Santa Tereza Reserve, and the Zoo are important natural conservation areas and tourist attractions. Pinguim Beerhouse, Theatro Pedro II, and projects such as Ribeirão Preto's Cinema Center are major sightseeing points, along with events such as the Agrishow Agricultural Fair, Ribeirão Rodeo Music, Joao Rock Music Festival, and the National Outdoor Book Fair.

== History ==
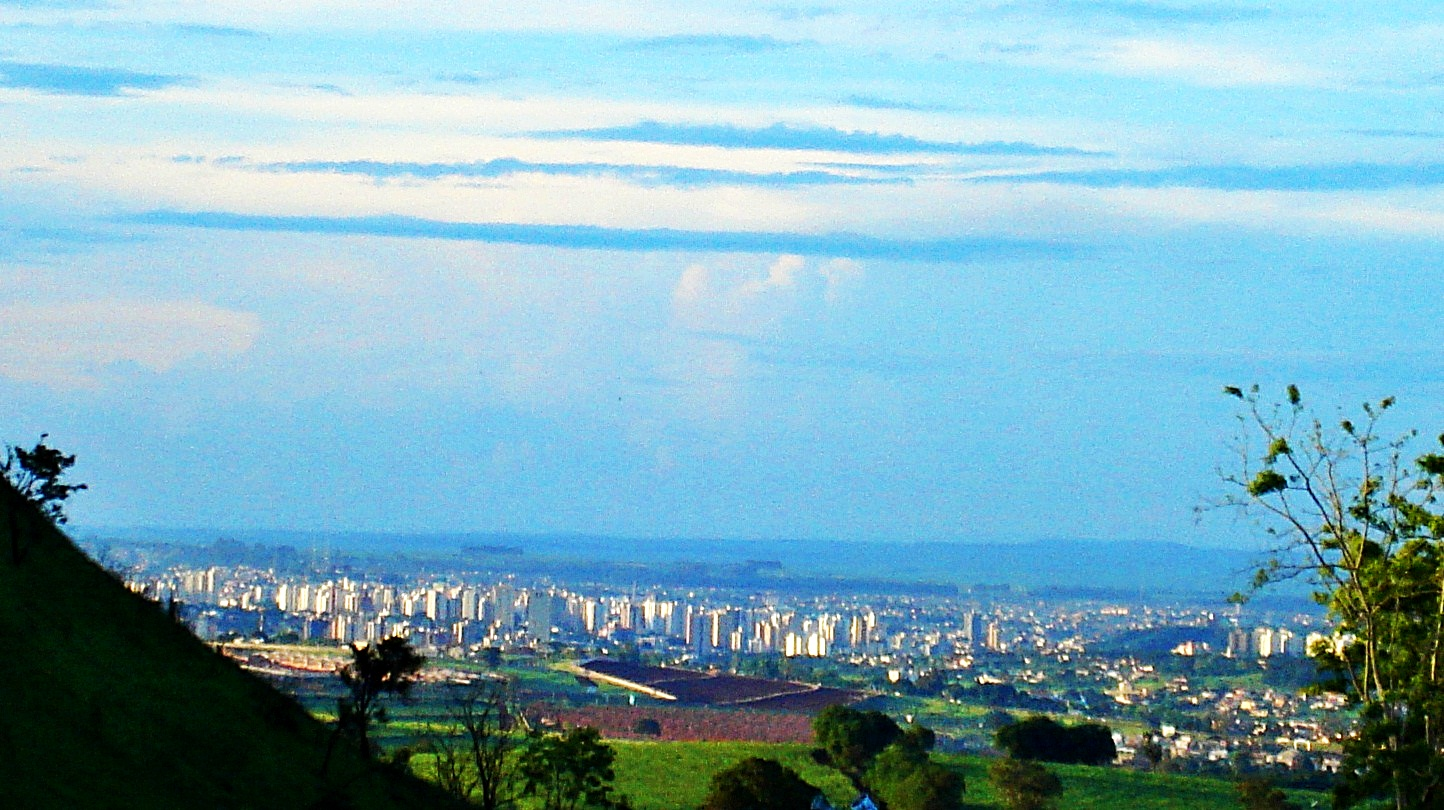
Panoramic view of Ribeirão Preto in 2006

The municipality was founded 19 June 1856, being populated initially by farmers and African slaves coming from other areas of São Paulo (especially from Mogi Mirim and São Simão) and Minas Gerais looking for land with good pastures. The city was built by a stream called Ribeirão Preto, meaning "black creek" or "black stream" in Portuguese, and was named after it. The region's fertile soil allowed high crop productivity.

Initially the main rural activities were pasture grazing, cattle breeding and subsistence agriculture. In the 1870s, the coffee crop arrived in Ribeirão Preto. The rapid development of coffee cultivation brought wealth and progress to the region, which by the 1880s had become the largest coffee producer in the world. Coffee, also called "green gold", caused a "gold rush" in the region which attracted workers and adventurous people from many parts of the world. This movement was helped by the new Mogiana Railway, linking Ribeirão Preto to São Paulo and to the port city of Santos, and by the abolition of slavery in Brazil in 1888. The end of slavery created a strong market for labor, and "coffee barons", as coffee farmers were called, stimulated immigration. Immigrants coming from Europe (mostly Italy, but also from Portugal, Spain and Germany) and from Japan settled on the coffee farms of Ribeirão Preto and neighboring towns. Some of the immigrants, especially the Italians, settled at the Núcleo Colonial Antonio Prado ("Antonio Prado Colonial Nucleus") which was created by the government in 1887. This nucleus originated many of the northern and eastern districts of Ribeirão Preto. Later, after the stock market crash of 1929, some of the immigrants bought the farms from their impoverished former employers.

== Demography ==
Historical population (municipality)
Year	Population	%±
1920	68,838
1940	79,783	15.9%
1950	92,160	15.5%
1960	147,361	59.9%
1970	212,879	44.5%
1980	318,544	49.6%
1991	436,682	37.1%
2000	504,923	15.6%
2010	604,682	19.8%
2022	698,642	15.5%

Adding to the Native Amerindians already living in the area when foreign migrants began to occupy and settle the land, the population of Ribeirão Preto includes, amongst other groups, descendants of Africans, Italians, Portuguese, Spanish, Japanese, Germans, and Lebanese immigrants who were attracted to the region after the abolition of slavery in 1888, when immigrants were granted lands after being indentured workers. Descendants of enslaved African people constitute a large and important element of the population. By 1902, over 50% of the city’s population was born in Italy.

During the 1990s, migrants from northeastern Brazil came to the region, attracted by São Paulo state's economic development, which was widely broadcast in television documentaries. Because many individuals in Ribeirão Preto's growing population often had no technical skills and were often illiterate, poverty and crime grew considerably. Many migrants boosted the economy by working in sugarcane plantations and orange groves. However, those who performed seasonal duties often found they had no safety net when the season ended. IBGE estimates from 2020 indicated that Ribeirão Preto had a population of 711,825 inhabitants. The urban agglomeration incorporates 34 municipalities, with a population of about 1.4 million inhabitants.

Ribeirão Preto population: 703,293 inhabitants (2019). Metropolitan area: approx. 1.7 million inhabitants

Data of the Census of 2010

- Total population: 605,114
  - Metro: 603,401
  - Rural: 1,713
  - Men: 290,286
  - Women: 314,828
- Population density (inhabitants/km^{2}): 930.42
- Infant mortality up to 1 year (per thousand): 9.90
- Life expectancy (years): 74.40
- Total fertility rate: 1.89
- Literacy rate: 95.56%
- Human Development Index (HDI): 0.855
  - HDI GDP: 0.855
  - HDI longevity: 0.823
  - HDI education: 0.918

Source: IPEAdata

=== Ethnicity ===
Ethnic groups	Percent
White	63.6%
Mixed	27.4%
Black	8.0%
Asian	0.8%
Amerindian	0.1%

Source: Census 2022

== Region ==
Political division map of the micro-region of Ribeirão Preto, with population ranges expressed in color

Ribeirão Preto is the center of a Metropolitan Area with about 1.662 million inhabitants (2017), and comprises the following 34 municipalities:

- Altinópolis
- Barrinha
- Brodowski
- Batatais
- Cravinhos
- Cajuru
- Cássia dos Coqueiros
- Dumont
- Guariba
- Guatapará
- Jaboticabal
- Jardinópolis
- Luís Antônio
- Mococa
- Monte Alto
- Morro Agudo
- Nuporanga
- Orlândia
- Pitangueiras
- Pontal
- Pradópolis
- Ribeirão Preto
- Sales Oliveira
- Santa Cruz da Esperança
- Santa Rita do Passa Quatro
- Santa Rosa de Viterbo
- Santo Antônio da Alegria
- São Simão
- Serra Azul
- Serrana
- Sertãozinho
- Taiuva
- Tambaú
- Taquaral

== Geography ==
=== Climate ===
The climate of Ribeirão Preto is tropical, specifically a tropical wet and dry climate (Aw in the Köppen climate classification), with rainy summers and dry winters. The record maximum recorded in the city was 43.6 °C (110.5 °F) on 29 October 2012.

- Average temperature: Winter 18.6 °C; Summer 23.9 °C
- Altitude: 531 m (between 504 and 852 meters)
- Average precipitation: 1508 mm of rain (annual total)
- Relative humidity: 71% (yearly average)

Climate data for Ribeirão Preto, elevation 632 m (2,073 ft), (1991–2020 normals, extremes 1991–2022)
Month	Jan	Feb	Mar	Apr	May	Jun	Jul	Aug	Sep	Oct	Nov	Dec	Year
Record high °C (°F)	36.9 (98.4)	37.2 (99.0)	36.1 (97.0)	35.2 (95.4)	32.6 (90.7)	31.8 (89.2)	33.4 (92.1)	36.5 (97.7)	40.3 (104.5)	40.4 (104.7)	38.3 (100.9)	38.8 (101.8)	40.4 (104.7)
Mean daily maximum °C (°F)	30.0 (86.0)	30.5 (86.9)	30.2 (86.4)	29.4 (84.9)	26.8 (80.2)	26.4 (79.5)	27.0 (80.6)	29.1 (84.4)	30.6 (87.1)	31.3 (88.3)	30.4 (86.7)	30.3 (86.5)	29.3 (84.8)
Daily mean °C (°F)	24.9 (76.8)	25.0 (77.0)	24.6 (76.3)	23.3 (73.9)	20.6 (69.1)	19.9 (67.8)	19.9 (67.8)	21.6 (70.9)	23.6 (74.5)	24.8 (76.6)	24.5 (76.1)	24.8 (76.6)	23.1 (73.6)
Mean daily minimum °C (°F)	19.7 (67.5)	19.5 (67.1)	19.1 (66.4)	17.3 (63.1)	14.3 (57.7)	13.3 (55.9)	12.8 (55.0)	14.1 (57.4)	16.5 (61.7)	18.3 (64.9)	18.6 (65.5)	19.4 (66.9)	16.9 (62.4)
Record low °C (°F)	14.6 (58.3)	14.0 (57.2)	13.5 (56.3)	5.8 (42.4)	5.3 (41.5)	0.2 (32.4)	0.0 (32.0)	3.8 (38.8)	4.9 (40.8)	9.6 (49.3)	10.5 (50.9)	12.3 (54.1)	0.0 (32.0)
Average precipitation mm (inches)	266.8 (10.50)	209.8 (8.26)	158.6 (6.24)	65.1 (2.56)	58.2 (2.29)	26.8 (1.06)	15.8 (0.62)	16.7 (0.66)	60.6 (2.39)	103.9 (4.09)	176.3 (6.94)	237.0 (9.33)	1,395.6 (54.94)
Average precipitation days (≥ 1.0 mm)	19.2	15.7	14.7	6.8	5.7	3.2	2.4	2.8	7.0	10.5	14.0	18.4	120.4
Source: Centro Integrado de Informações Agrometeorológicas

=== Hydrography ===
- Pardo River
- Ribeirão Preto ("Black Creek", origin of the city's name)
- Retiro Saudoso Creek
- Tanquinho Creek
- Laureano Creek
- Das Palmeiras Creek
- Dos Catetos Creek
- Dos Campos Creek
- Vista Alegre Creek
- Antarctica Creek
- Olhos d'Água Creek
- California Creek
- Limeirinha Creek

== Tourism, culture and events ==
Teatro Pedro II

At the beginning of the 20th century and during its first three decades, Ribeirão Preto was a rich city, boasting several mansions, European-style cafés, cabarets and even two opera houses, as result of the coffee economy. One of the opera houses – the Carlos Gomes Theatre (in honour of Brazilian opera composer Carlos Gomes) – was demolished in 1949, but the other – the "Pedro II Theatre" (named in honor of Emperor Dom Pedro II), dating from the 1920s – resisted time and was restored and modernized during the 1990s. Its ceiling, completely destroyed in a fire of 1980, was rebuilt and gained a new design projected by Japanese-Brazilian artist Tomie Ohtake. The Pedro II Theatre is now the third largest opera house in Brazil and is the home of the Ribeirão Preto symphony orchestra, one of the oldest and most important in Brazil.

Several events take place in Ribeirão Preto, many of which occur annually, such as the Agrishow (an international fair of agricultural technology), Fair Photo Image, Film Festival Ribeirão Preto, National Book Fair of Ribeirão Preto, Festival Tanabata (Japanese cultural festival), Festitália (Italian cultural festival), João Rock Music Fest, Ribeirão Rodeo Music, Bonfim Paulista Rodeo Show, Ribeirão Skol Folia, Fair ExpoHair, Feitrans (Fair Transport Interior Paulista), Arena Cross, Entorta Bixo, Ribeirão Cana Invest, Expobonsai, AVIRRP, Comida di Buteco, Restaurant Week Ribeirão Preto, Ribeirão Preto Tropeada, Mitsubishi Rally Cup, Copa Chevrolet Montana, and others. These events move various segments of the municipality, as the airport, bus system, taxi, hotel chain, bars, restaurants, and more.

The municipality has a hot climate, which makes people go out in the evening to chat and enjoy cold draft beers in bars. Therefore, the municipality is teeming with bars, from the simple "botequins" or "botecos" that one can find in almost every corner, to the most sophisticated pub style bars, which rival their counterparts in São Paulo and Rio de Janeiro. Ribeirão Preto has also many micro-breweries, many of them nationally known.

Ribeirão Preto is considered one of the major centers of business tourism in the country, being chosen by the Ministry of Tourism as an inducer of regional tourism development, between 4 cities of São Paulo and 64 other locations throughout Brazil. Currently the city has 52 hotels in full operation, with 8600 beds (or jobs), beyond 30 motels with 2000 beds, beds totaling 10,600 rooms in the network of the city.

There are still many convention centers and event spaces, such as:

- Convention Center Ribeirão Preto, capacity: 2450 people;
- Convention Center Taiwan, capacity: 400, 1000, 3000 and 5000 people per venue;
- Events Center CENACON, capacity: 1700 people;
- Mediterranean Area Events Center, capacity: 3000 people;
- Events Center Hotel JP, capacity: 1800 people;
- White Canvas Events Center, capacity: 1700 people;
- New Event Space Centre, capacity: 4000 people;
- Events West Shopping Center, capacity: 3000 people;
- Ribeirão Preto Expo Center.
- NEO Convention (under construction), capacity: 600 people;
- Exhibition Park IAC, capacity: 380 people;
- Exhibition Park: capacity: 1500 people;
- Santo Antônio Space, capacity 1500 people.

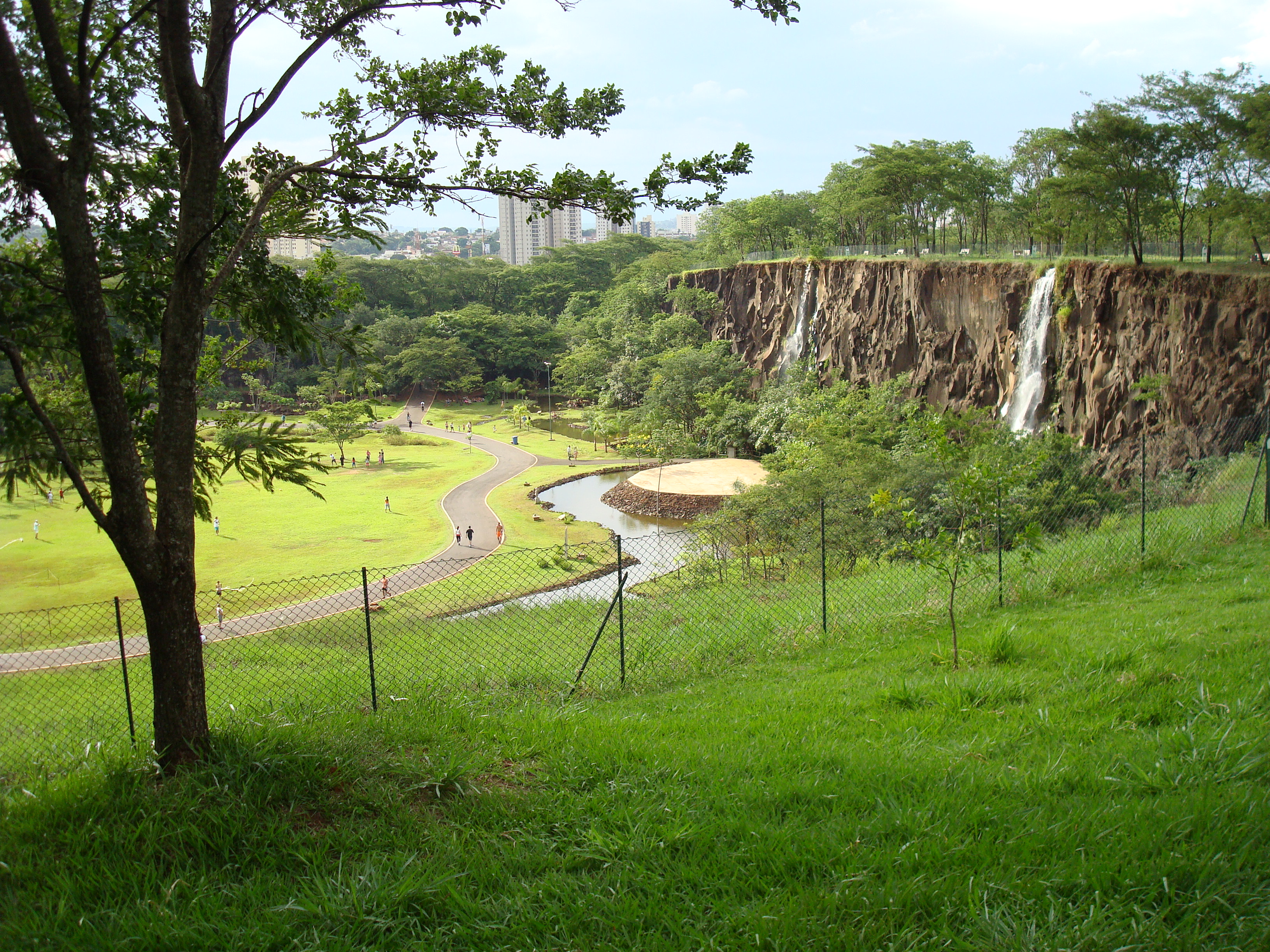
"Curupira" Park.

=== Parks and forests ===
Ribeirão Preto has many parks, gardens and a zoo e.g. Fábio Barreto municipal forest; a municipal park called "Curupira", officially named Luís Roberto Jábali Park; the Botanical Garden Park, named as Luís Carlos Raya Park, both located in the south zone; Tom Jobim Park, located in the northwest region and Maurílio Biagi Ecological Park, located in the central region.

=== Theatres and museums ===
Ribeirão Preto has some museums and theatres, highlighting the Theatro Pedro II (Pedro II Theatre), which is an opera house, located in the central region, more specifically in the "Quarterão Paulista" (Paulista Square), considered the third largest of the category in Brazil, with capacity for 1580 spectators and a total area of 6500 m^{2}, inaugurated on October 8, 1930. Another highlight is the Municipal Theatre, inaugurated in 1969 with modern lines, which has capacity for 515 people. Being a large and wooded place, is also used for cultural events. There is also the Arena Theater, which is next to the Municipal Theatre, among others.

Some museums stand out in the city, as the "Coffee Museum Francisco Schmidt," which was built in the early 1950s, known for saving the most important collection of pieces of São Paulo on the History of Coffee. Its collection consists of large sculptures, bullock carts, trolleys, coffee machines benefit, plus photos of the golden age of coffee in the region of Ribeirão Preto. Another important museum is the Art Museum of Ribeirão Preto (MARP) - "Manuel Pedro Gismondi". The municipality has other museums, such as the Casa da Memória Italiana (Italian Memory House), Museum of General Order and the Museum of Image and Sound.

Theatres in the city:

- Auxiliadora Theatre;
- Bassano Vaccarini Theatre;
- Arena Theatre;
- SESC Theatre;
- Minaz Theatre;
- Municipal Theatre;
- Pedro II Theatre/Opera House;
- Santa Rosa Theatre;
- Sesi Theatre.

=== Cinema ===
Ribeirão Preto is a major center of cinema in Brazil, with the Kaiser Film Studios, held by the São Paulo Film Commission, with space of more than 13 thousand square meters of constructed area and houses an entire infrastructure for audiovisual production. Situated in the historic city center, (the company's former headquarters Brewery Paulista), this historical and cultural heritage is listed by the Defense Council of Historical, Artistic, Archaeological and Tourism of the State of São Paulo (Condephaat), Council of Heritage Preservation Cultural de Ribeirão Preto (Conppac) and at present is in the process of overturning the Iphan – "Institute of National Historical and Artistic Heritage.

In addition, the city still has the largest film society in the country, Cineclube Cauim (900 seats), and dozens of mainstream cinema rooms, such as UCI, Cinemark and Cinepolis.

=== Carnival ===
Ribeirão Preto is the birthplace of one of the oldest samba schools in Brazil: the "Bambas" founded in 1927. However, as a string carnival, becoming samba schools later. Besides this pioneering school, there are the Embaixadores dos Campos Elíseos (Ambassadors of Campos Elíseos), Tradição do Ipiranga (Tradition of Ipiranga), Camisa 12 Corintiana (12 Corinthian Shirt) and Imperadores do Samba (Emperors of Samba). In Bonfim Paulista district, two samba schools are present: Acadêmicos de Bonfim and Unidos da Vila.

In 2010, Ribeirão Preto was chosen as the theme for Águias de Ouro Samba School parade, in São Paulo Sambodrome, showing its history related to coffee, sugar cane and agribusiness.

There are also some street carnival groups, such as "Os Alegrões" (Jardim Irajá neighborhood) and "O Berro" (in the city center).

== Sports ==
The municipality possesses two soccer stadiums, the Estádio Palma Travassos (of Comercial FC) and Santa Cruz (of Botafogo FC). Botafogo FC is currently competing in Campeonato Brasileiro Série B and Campeonato Paulista, whereas Comercial FC is currently competing in Campeonato Paulista Série A3. On the national and international scene, Botafogo is often confused with the Rio de Janeiro club with the same name to the extent that the Rio club is often credited with being the infamous club against which Pelé scored a record 8 goals in one game. One example is in Franklin Foer's book "How Soccer Explains the World". But it was in the Paulista championships on November 21, 1964, in the coastal city of Santos and against the Ribeirão Preto's team that Pelé achieved the incredible feat and his Santos team won by an 11 × 0 score. The 8 goals were payback for the defeat Santos suffered on September 6, 1964, when they visited Ribeirão Preto during the first round of the tournament and lost 2 x 0. Not only had a "small" team beaten one of the "big" teams, but had done so while insulting the "King". A better claim to fame for Botafogo (often referred to as Botafogo-SP) is that Brazilian soccer captains (and brothers) Sócrates and Raí started their careers with Botafogo.

In 2017 a men's volleyball team was founded in Ribeirão Preto, Vôlei Ribeirão, which was champion of Superliga Brasileira B in 2018, and competed in Superliga Brasileira, the major volleyball league in Brazil, from 2019 to 2021. The matches of Vôlei Ribeirão took place at Cava do Bosque, a public sports centre in Ribeirão Preto. The volleyball team ended in 2021.

The skateboard gained in 2021 a new space in the city, the RP Skate Park, placed at Maurilio Biagi Ecological Park. With 4,000 square meters, the skate park was projected by the world champion Bob Burnquist and is able to receive the styles park and street.

From September 1 to 16, 2023, Ribeirão Preto hosted the brazilian Youth Games. Organized by the Brazilian Olympic Committee, this event brought about 4,000 athletes up to 17 years old from all brazilian states and the Federal District, disputing in 18 sports events (athletics, swimming, open water swimming, triathlon, cycling, volleyball, beach volleyball, basketball, handball, artistic gymnastics, rhythmic gymnastics, judo, taekwondo, wrestling, fencing, badminton, table tennis and archery). The opening ceremony was at Pedro II Theatre.

=== National Team Training Centres (CTSs) FIFA World Cup 2014 ===
Ribeirão Preto was among the municipalities that met the basic requirements for a training centre for 2014 FIFA World Cup. Therefore, it was selected by France national football team as base for the 2014 FIFA World Cup in Brazil. The stadium Santa Cruz was the training base, whereas the Theatre Pedro II hosted press conferences.

== Economy ==
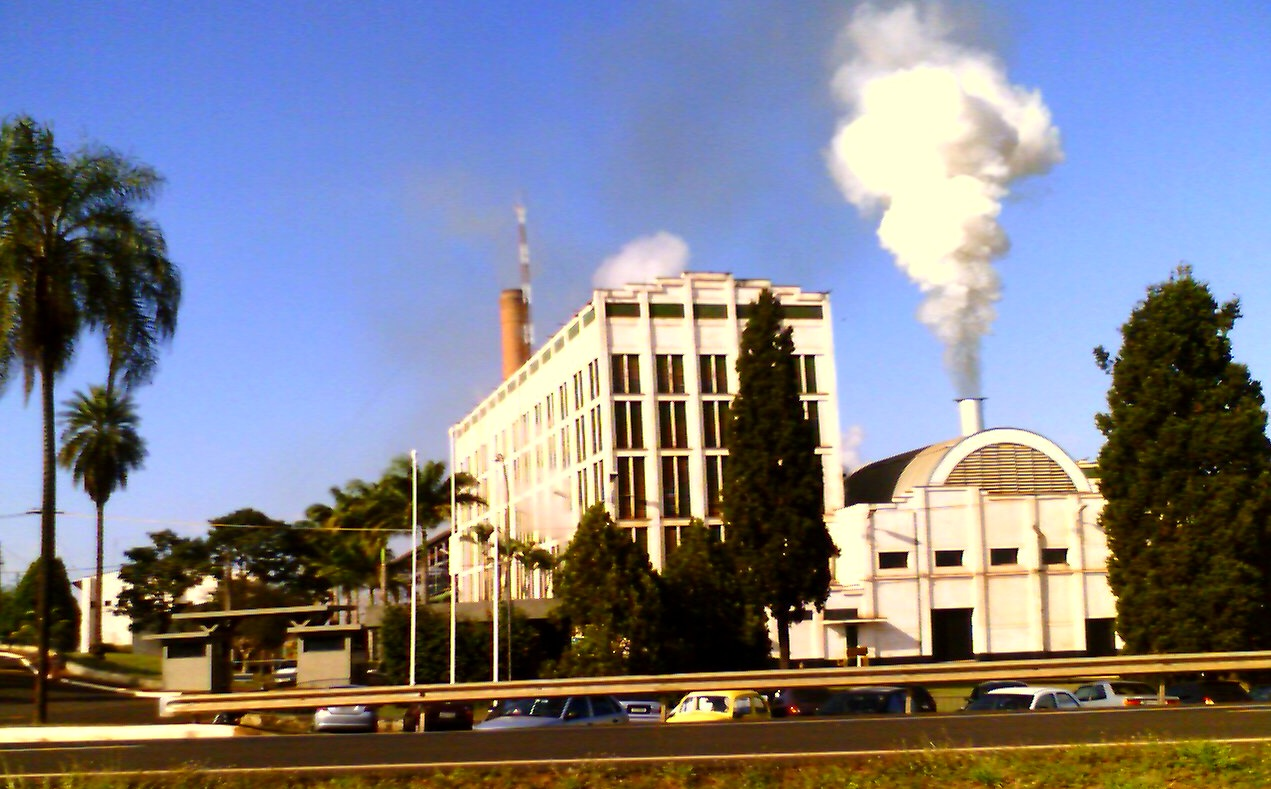
The Santa Elisa sugarcane processing plant, one of the largest and oldest in Brazil, is located near Ribeirão Preto.

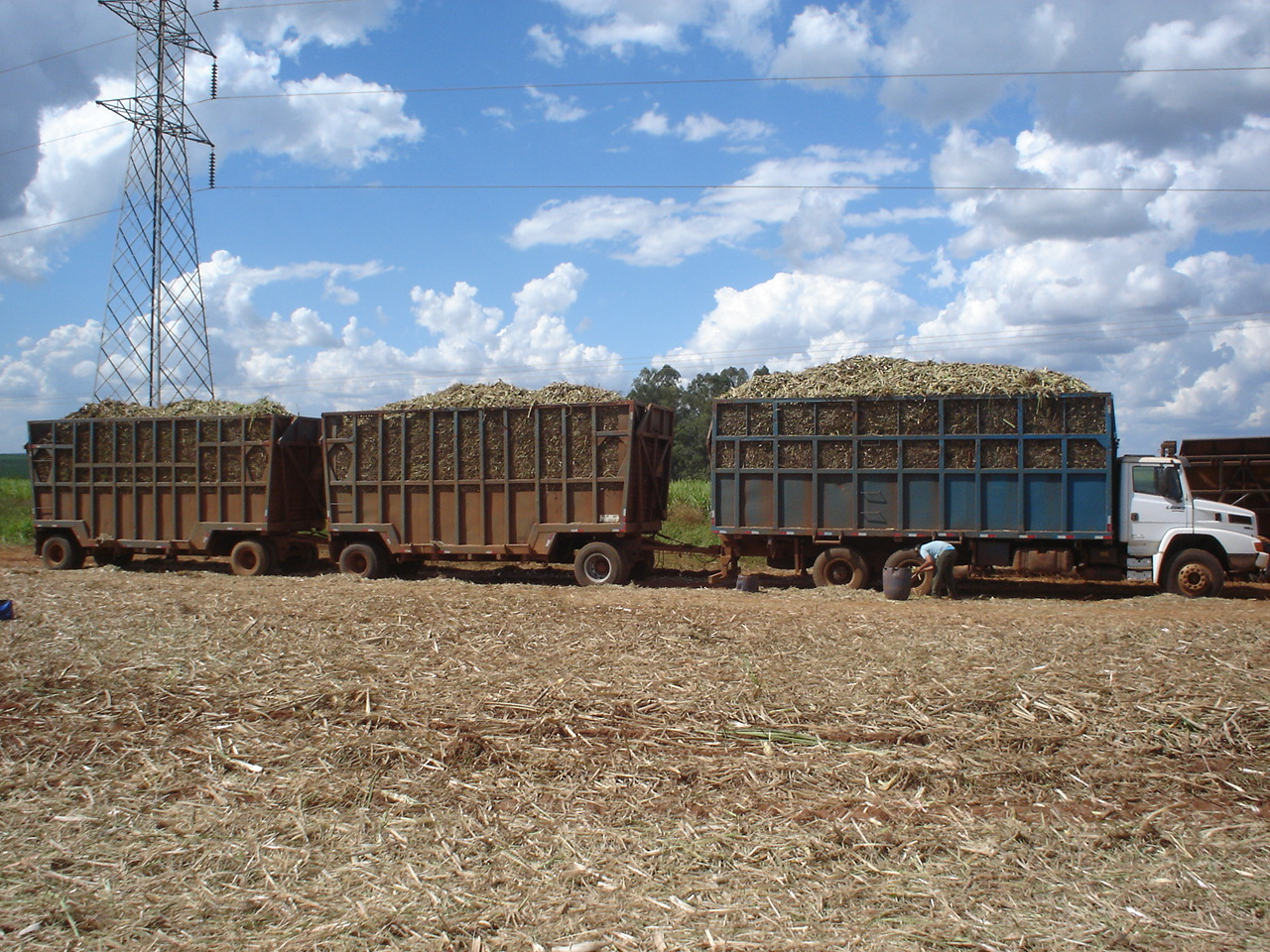
Typical sugarcane harvest transport near Ribeirão Preto

After the New York Stock Exchange crash of 1929 the economy of Ribeirão Preto, based on a single export crop, collapsed, and the city had to adapt to a new situation. Since the city is relatively far from other major Brazilian urban centers, it found a new economic vocation in the services and commercial sector, which was developed to attend the local and regional demands.

The second economic boom in the history of Ribeirão Preto occurred after the oil crisis (1973 and 1979) of the 1970s. The increase in the oil price obliged Brazil to look for alternative means of fueling and the solution found was the alcohol fuel program, or Pro-Álcool as it is called. Pró-Álcool led to the development of a technology which allows the use of ethanol (sugarcane alcohol) either as automotive fuel or as a gasoline additive. The latter improves performance and substitutes lead thus decreasing polluting emissions. Due to the Pró-Álcool program, farmers from the region of Ribeirão Preto were encouraged by government subsidies to grow sugarcane. The high productivity of the land around Ribeirão Preto rapidly placed the region as the largest alcohol and sugar producer of the world, being responsible for 30 percent of Brazil's sugarcane alcohol fuel.

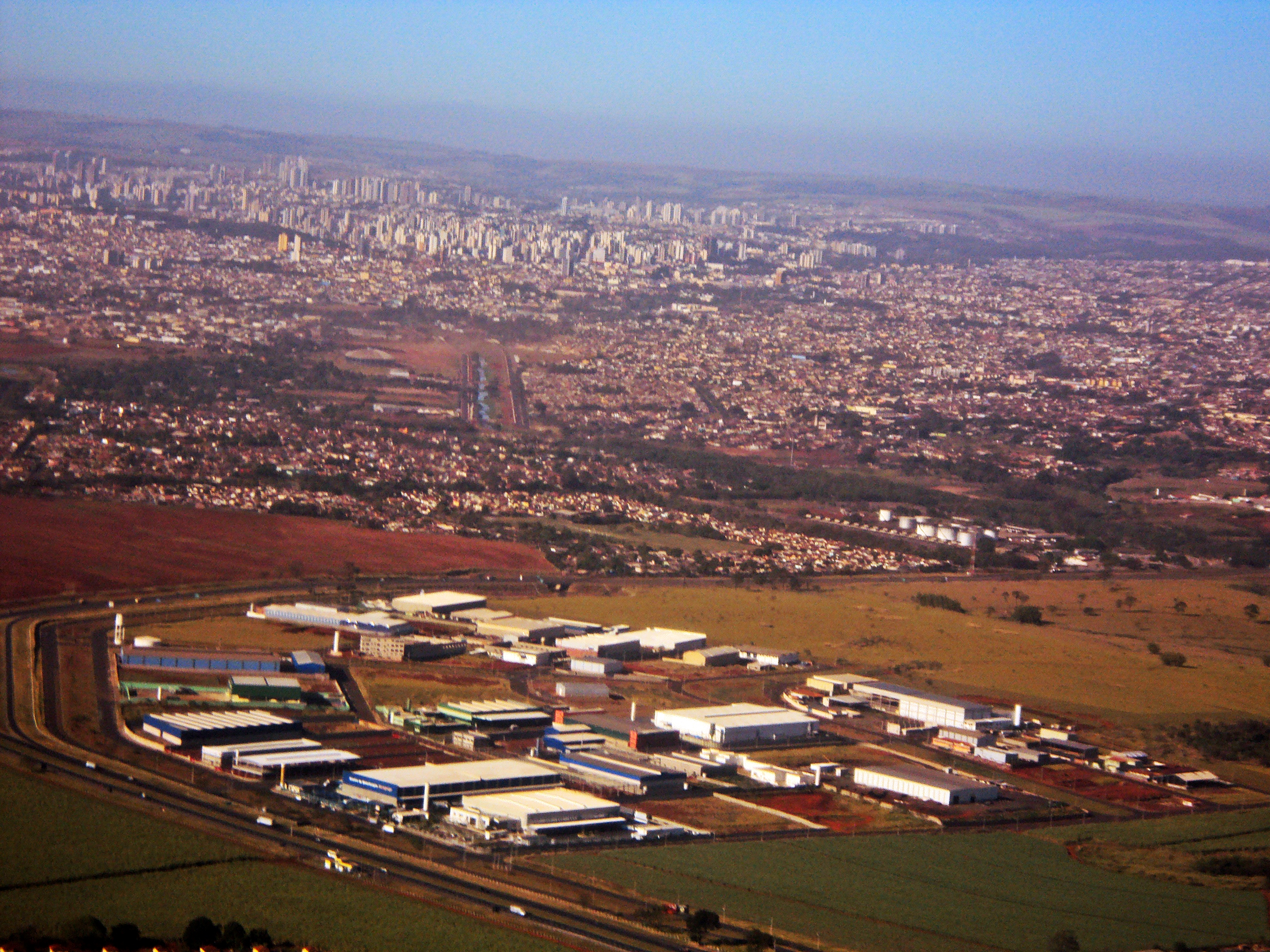
Business District of Ribeirão Preto.

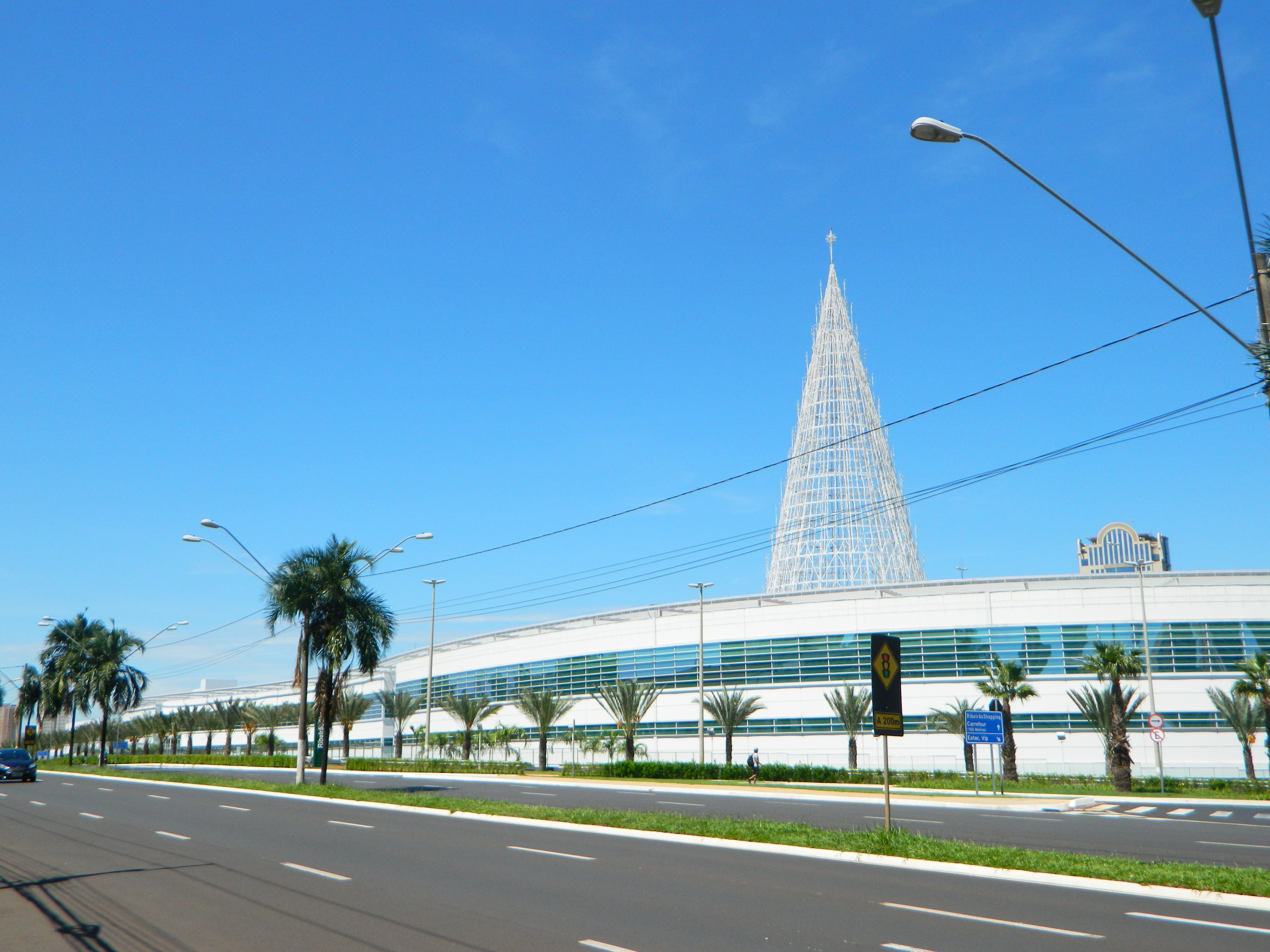
The mall "Ribeirão Shopping".

The sugarcane boom brought a new age of prosperity for the city, which was called the "Brazilian California" during the 1980s and early 1990s. On the one hand, this has increased the city's wealth and turned it into a sophisticated centre of services for Brazil and South America but, on the other hand, the image of a new "Eldorado" attracted many migrants from impoverished areas of Brazil leading to a rapid population growth and the appearance of slums (favelas as they are called in Brazil).

Nowadays, the sugarcane is the major crop produced in the rural area of the municipality, followed by minor crops such as pastures, maize, peanut and soybean. Ribeirão Preto's major manufactures are: medical materials, dental materials, animal feed, meat, dairy products, textiles, steel, furniture, building materials, agrochemicals, pharmaceuticals and, of course, beer. The city hosts "Agrishow" on an annual basis, this show is one of the most important agricultural trade shows in Brazil.

The airline Passaredo Transportes Aéreos has its headquarters in the Jardim Aeroporto area of the city.

== Government ==
The municipal administration is given by the executive power and by the legislative power. The first to govern the municipality was João Gonçalves dos Santos, who was in the position of intendant for some months of 1874. Currently the municipal mayor is Ricardo Silva, from the Social Democratic Party (PSD).

=== Twin towns – sister cities ===
Ribeirão Preto is twinned with:

- Bucaramanga, Colombia.
- Ripa Teatina, Italy.
- San Leandro, United States.
- Teramo, Italy.

=== Subdivisions ===
Besides the main administration, the city has three regional administrations (sub city halls):

- Regional administration 1: North (Campos Elísios)
- Regional administration 2: West (Vila Tibério)
- Regional administration 3: South (Bonfim Paulista)

== Urban infrastructure ==
=== Health ===
In 2009 the municipality counted with 319 health establishments such as hospitals, emergencies rooms, clinics and dental care, being 64 of these publics and 255 private. With them, the city had 2,177 beds available for hospitalization, which 847 are in the public's establishments and 1,320 in the private's. In 2011, 95.7% of the children of under-1 year had their immunization updated. In 2010 was registered 8,141 new born, and the infant mortality rate as 9.7/ every 1,000 born child and 99.8% of all the new born had assisted birth. In the same year 12.5% of all pregnant women were under-20 years. 32,963 children were weighed by the Family's Health Program, and 0.8% of them were undernourished.

Ribeirão Preto has the following hospitals, among public and privates: Hospital das Clínicas de Ribeirão Preto - HC Campus (Clinics Hospital of Ribeirão Preto) - Emergency Unit and HC Criança; Hospital Estadual de Ribeirão Preto (State Hospital of Ribeirão Preto); Hospital Santa Casa de Ribeirão Preto (Santa Casa Hospital); Hospital Psiquiátrico Santa Tereza (Santa Tereza Psychiatric Hospital); Sanatório Espírita Vicente de Paulo (Spiritist Sanatorium Vicente de Paulo); Beneficência Portuguesa Hospital; Hospital do Câncer de Ribeirão Preto - SOBECCan (Cancer Hospital of Ribeirão Preto); São Lucas Hospital; Ribeirânia Hospital; Hospital Municipal Santa Lydia (Santa Lydia Municipal Hospital); São Paulo Hospital; São Francisco Hospital; Electro Bonini Hospital; Mater; Hospital Maternidade Sinhá Junqueira (Sinha Junqueira Maternity Hospital); RDO VIVER Hospital; Unimed Ribeirão Hospital.

The Ribeirão Preto's Health division is linked to the City hall and responsible for the maintenance and operation of the Sistema Unico de Saude (SUS- Unified Health System), and for the policies, programs and projects that aimed the city's health. For the first care the city counts with 33 Units UBDS and UBS. Among the support and basic attention services there're the Homeopathy and Herbal Medicine Program, Sanitary Surveillance (VISA), the Programme for Health Care of the Person with Disabilities (PASDEF), the Home Care Service (DSS), the Health Program of the Deaf and Fissured (Prodaf) and the Program Community Integration (PIC). The Service Mobile Emergency (EMS) in Ribeirão Preto was one of the first to be instituted in Brazil, counting today with 11 ambulances basic (USBs) and a mobile ICU.

The Ministry of Health has identified Ribeirão Preto as the best city in the state and the third best in the country, among the 29 Brazilian municipalities with the highest income and infrastructure in access and quality of the health services. The city received a score of 6.69, above the Brazilian average of 5.47, according to the SUS Index of Performance (ldsus). The top two ranked cities are Vitória (ES) and Curitiba (PR), with scores of 7.08 and 6.96, respectively. The hospitals, clinics and medical centres of Ribeirão Preto attract people from many municipalities of the region.

=== Education ===
The medium Basic Education Performance Index (IDEB) among the city's public schools was, in 2009, 4.0 (in a scale from 1 to 10), considering that the note from the 5th years was 4.4 and the 9th years was 3.7; the note of the municipals and publics schools in the hole country was also 4,0. Among the private institutions the municipal index raises to 6.1 (6.4 for the 5th years students and 5.9 for the 9th years). The education Human Development Index (HDI) was 0.918 (classified as very elevated), while Brazil's was 0.849.

The municipality counted, in 2009, with approximated 117,373 enrollments in the schools. According to the Brazilian Institute of Geographic and Statics, in the same year, out of all 168 elementary schools, 60 belonged to the state, 26 to the municipality and 82 were private. Among all 68 high schools, 32 belonged to the state, 3 to the municipality and 33 were private. In 2000, 5.5% of the children from 7 to 14 were not at school. The graduation average among teen of 15 to 17 years was, in the same year, 67.7%. The index of alphabetization of the population above 15 years, in 2010, was of 98.9%. In 2006, for each 100 girls there were 105 boys in the elementary school.

The city's Education Office has as their objective to coordinate and advise the management and pedagogical the city's education system. Are examples of the programs coordinated by the Office the Young and Adults Education (EJA) that is a non-cost education for the adults that had not concluded elementary schooling and the Special Education Networking, where students who have physical disabilities are conducted by specialist teachers.

During the economic stagnation from the 1940s to the 1950s the city discovered and established its vocation as an educational and university center. In 1942 the state government expropriated the Monte Alegre Farm, an important coffee farm from the Schmidt family of German immigrants, and transformed it into an agricultural practical school. Several new buildings and houses for the professors were constructed on a land which held before tens of thousands of coffee plants. The new school was very well planned and urbanized and many trees were planted to provide shadow and give it a pleasant atmosphere. But the agricultural school never achieved a significant development and it was closed in 1951. A longstanding dream of the population of Ribeirão Preto was to have a university and in 1952 the old farm was donated to the University of São Paulo for the creation of a medical school, which was the first school of its campus at Ribeirão Preto.

Fortunately, many original buildings of the agricultural school and even some of the Monte Alegre Farm were preserved and only adapted to hold the new university, which makes its campus one of the most beautiful university campuses in Brazil. After the creation of the medical school the University of São Paulo at Ribeirão Preto (USP-RP) has been growing steadily and it is presently constituted by eight schools: School of Medicine of Ribeirão Preto (FMRP), School of Law of Ribeirão Preto (FDRP), School of Philosophy, Sciences and Letters (FFCLRP), School of Dentistry (FORP), School of Economics, Administration and Accounting (FEARP), School of Pharmaceutical Sciences (FCFRP), School of Nursing (EERP) and School of Music (DMRP-ECA).

The creation of USP-RP stimulated the cultural and academic life in Ribeirão Preto and several schools, colleges and universities were opened in the city since then. The municipality has also many private colleges such as: Centro Universitário Barão da Mauá, Centro Universitário Moura Lacerda, Centro Universitário Estácio, Faculdade Anhanguera, Faculdade Reges, Faculdade São Luís, Fundação Armando Alvares Penteado (FAAP), Universidade Paulista (UNIP), Universidade de Ribeirão Preto (UNAERP).

One interesting fact is that in Ribeirão Preto there is one Local Committee of AIESEC. Present in over 110 countries and territories and with over 60,000 members, AIESEC is the world's largest student-run organisation. Focused on providing a platform for youth leadership development, AIESEC offers young people the opportunity to be global citizens, to change the world, and to get experience and skills that matter today. Their office is in Rua das Paineiras, casa 9, USP, Monte Alegre.

=== Science and technology ===
Despite Ribeirão Preto, the entire region comprehends one of the principal University and Research Centers of the State, highlighting the health, engineering and high technology in São Carlos, agronomics, vet and zoo in Jaboticabal, zoo and food engineering at Pirassununga, among others. Therefore, the region consolidates itself as an important technological and educational polo. In May 2012 was opened the School of Technological Training (FORTEC) "Jandyra Camargo Moquenco" downtown, beginning its activities with four classes and attending around 900 students, divided in three shifts.

Ribeirão Preto's Technology Park has as its objective to support the scientific and technological development of the area, attracting companies that invest in research and development of products, focused in the areas of health and biotechnology, that prioritize sustainable development. The focus is to the Education and Research institutions, that comprehends the development of human resources, the availability of technological services and competence, and the technological demands from the companies in the area of Ribeirão Preto and from Brazil itself altogether with the international and national's technological trends in the Health and Biotechnology industry. Ribeirão Preto's Technology Park counts with equipment that induces research and development, as the Medical and Hospital Equipment Laboratory, a Business Center and a Business Incubator. The city also is an educational center in IT. In 2005 the city counted already with more than 300 companies in the activity and in 2010 the area had an increase of 23% in the income of the companies in the industry of Information and Communication Technology. Other areas that the city also stands out in the technological sector are the Health, the Biotechnology and the Bioenergy, considered one of the biggest sugar and ethanol's producers worldwide.

== Transportation ==
=== Public transportation ===
- Ribeirão Preto's public transportation system is operated by three companies and about 300 buses that attend 113 lines and routes.
- There are 30 routes operated by small-sized buses. These routes connect distant districts to the main stations and are free of charge.
- An electronic card is required to use public transportation. The card works as a pre-paid fare system, and the fares are debited directly from the electronic card. These electronic cards are issued by the transportation department, which is called Transerp.

=== Main highways ===
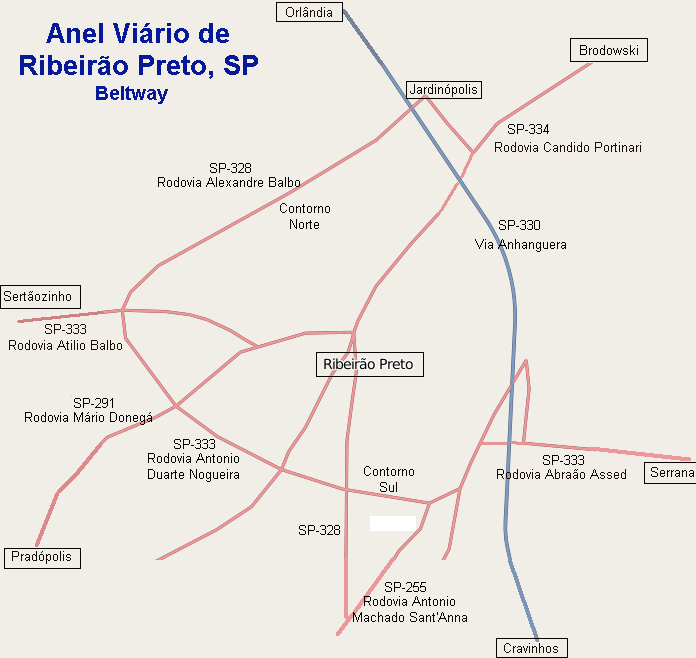
Ribeirão Preto Beltway

Ribeirão Preto has a road network that connects the cities of São Paulo state and to the capital, having access to highways statewide and even national importance through side roads and two-lane paved, as the National Highway Cândido Portinari and Anhanguera highway. Anhanguera is one of the most important roads of São Paulo, being inserted in the northeast corridor of the state, linking it to Minas Gerais. In a radius of 200 km around the city are some of the major cities in the interior of São Paulo and Minas Gerais, such as Araraquara, São Carlos, Bauru, Piracicaba, Campinas, São José do Rio Preto, Uberaba and Uberlândia, being facilitated by the availability of access roads. The following highways pass through the city:

- Highway Antonio Machado Sant'Anna (SP-255) – Linking Ribeirão Preto to Araraquara and São Carlos;
- Mario Donegá Highway (SP-291) – Road linking Ribeirão Preto to Pradópolis and Dumont;
- Attilio Balbo Highway and Highway Armando Salles de Oliveira (SP-322) – Connects Ribeirão Preto to Sertãozinho;
- Highway Alexandre Balbo (SP-328) – Ring Road North;
- Highway Mayor Antonio Duarte Nogueira (SP-328) – Ring Road South;
- Rodovia Anhangüera Highway (SP-330) – Linking Ribeirão Preto to Brasília, Campinas and São Paulo;
- Abraao Assed Highway (SP-333) – Road linking Ribeirão Preto to Serrana and Cajuru;
- Highway Cândido Portinari (SP-334) – Road linking Ribeirão Preto to Batatais and Franca

=== Bus station ===
The bus station of Ribeirão Preto (Portuguese: Rodoviária de Ribeirão Preto) is placed in the central area of the city, and operates 24 hours a day, connecting Ribeirão Preto to many other cities in São Paulo and in other Brazilian states.

=== Airport ===
Leite Lopes Airport offers support and infrastructure compatible with airports of major centers. It operates full-time, with more than 1.1 million passengers (2015). From here depart flights to important cities of Brazil, such as São Paulo, Rio de Janeiro, Brasília, Goiânia, Belo Horizonte, Curitiba, Salvador and Campinas.

Ribeirão Preto's Airport is administered by the São Paulo's Airway Department (DAESP). It is one of the main airports in state of São Paulo. It functions full-time and received, in 2011, more than 54,000 flights and nearly 1.1 million passengers, making it the 26th busiest airport in Brazil, with more movement than some Brazilian capitals.

With a runway measuring 2.100 x 45m, a passenger terminal with 3850 m^{2} and 840 car parking spaces, works for expansions are about to start (2018) amplifying the passengers terminal to 12,000m^{2}.

Also operates charter flights and houses the headquarters of Passaredo (important regional airline), and a flying club.

=== Railroad ===
Currently the city's railway system is not functional. There are some projects underway to revitalize it.

The first railway to arrive in Ribeirão Preto belonged to the Mogiana Company of Railroads, and the railway station was inaugurated on November 23, 1883. In 1970 it became part of the Railroad Paulista SA, and continued to operate until 1976 when the railroad tracks were transferred. On June 1, 1966, was inaugurated the new railway station, now owned by Centro- Atlantic (FCA), which received passengers until August 1997, when these trains were suppressed. In addition to these Ribeirão Preto has been served by two other railroads. The Dumont Railway, built by Mogiana, connecting the city to the farm Dumont, owned by Henrique Santos Dumont, at west of the city, and the train station Dumont, who belonged to the railroad, was inaugurated in 1890 and abandoned by the closure of the line in 1940, and demolished in March 1968. The Railroad São Paulo-Minas transported ore between Ribeirão Preto and Minas Gerais, with the station that was inaugurated on May 1, 1928, and operated until around 1970.

== Media ==
In telecommunications, the city was served by Centrais Telefônicas de Ribeirão Preto. In December 2000, this company was acquired by Telefónica, which adopted the Vivo brand in 2012. The company is currently an operator of cell phones, fixed lines, internet (fiber optics/4G) and television (satellite and cable).

== In popular culture ==
The city plays a major role in Orson Scott Card's Ender saga, as it becomes the headquarters of the Hegemony and the South American capital of the Free People of Earth (the world government).

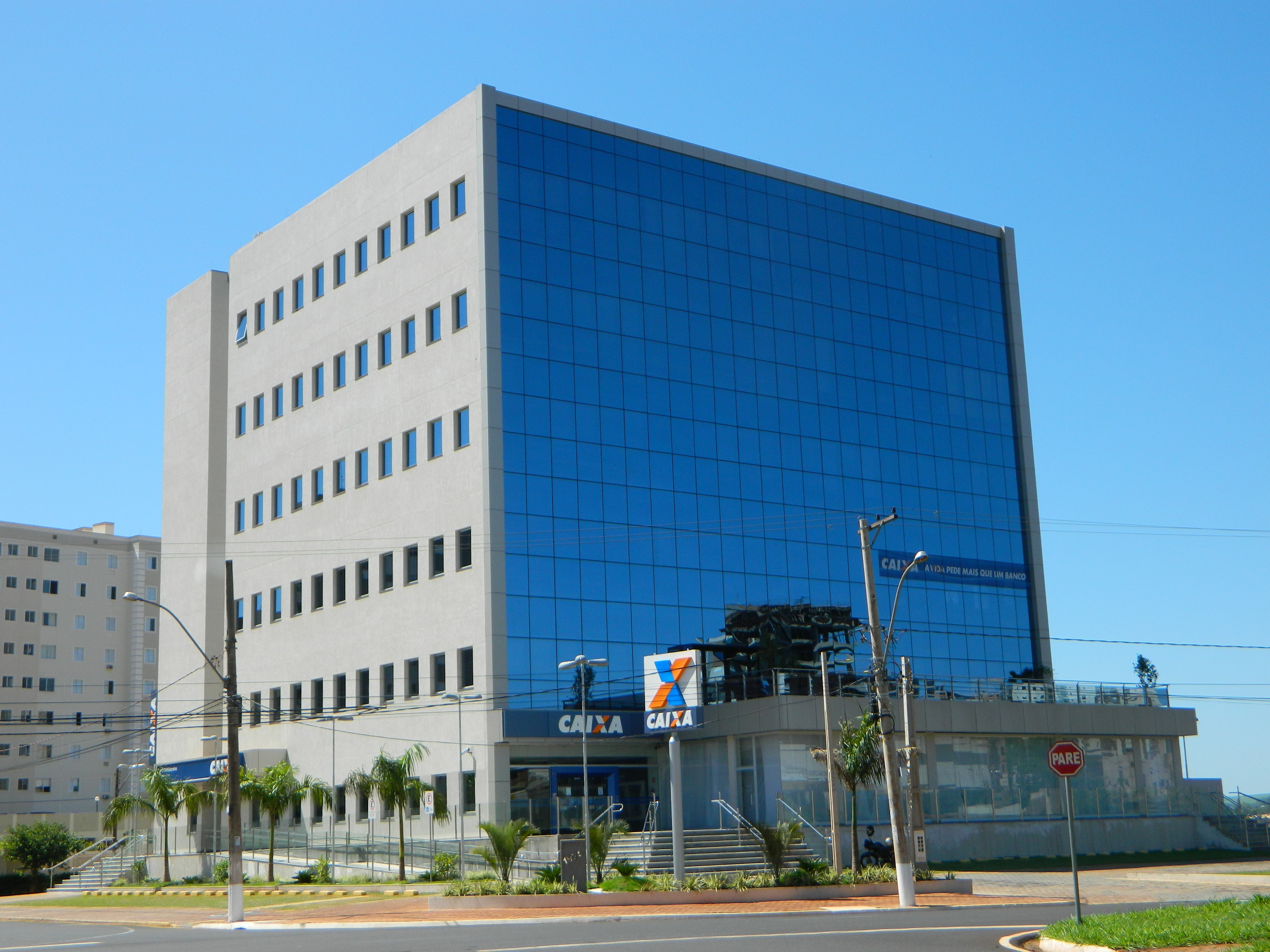
Caixa headquarters in the city.

== Notable people ==
- Alex, former footballer and played for the Armenia national football team
- Amador Aguiar, founder of Banco Bradesco
- Gustavo Borges, swimmer
- Hélio Castroneves, racing driver
- Lino Facioli, actor
- Sérgio Henrique Ferreira (1934–2016), physician and pharmacologist
- Gimenez, footballer and one of the victims of LaMia Flight 2933
- Marcos Gomes, racing driver
- Paulo Gomes, racing driver
- Warwick Estevam Kerr, agricultural engineer
- Luana Barbosa dos Reis, victim of police brutality
- Maurício Rocha e Silva (1910–1983), physician and pharmacologist
- Nicholas Santos, swimmer
- Kiko Zambianchi, musician

== See also ==
- Coffee production in Brazil
- List of municipalities in São Paulo
