= Cicinho =

Brazilian footballer (born 1980)

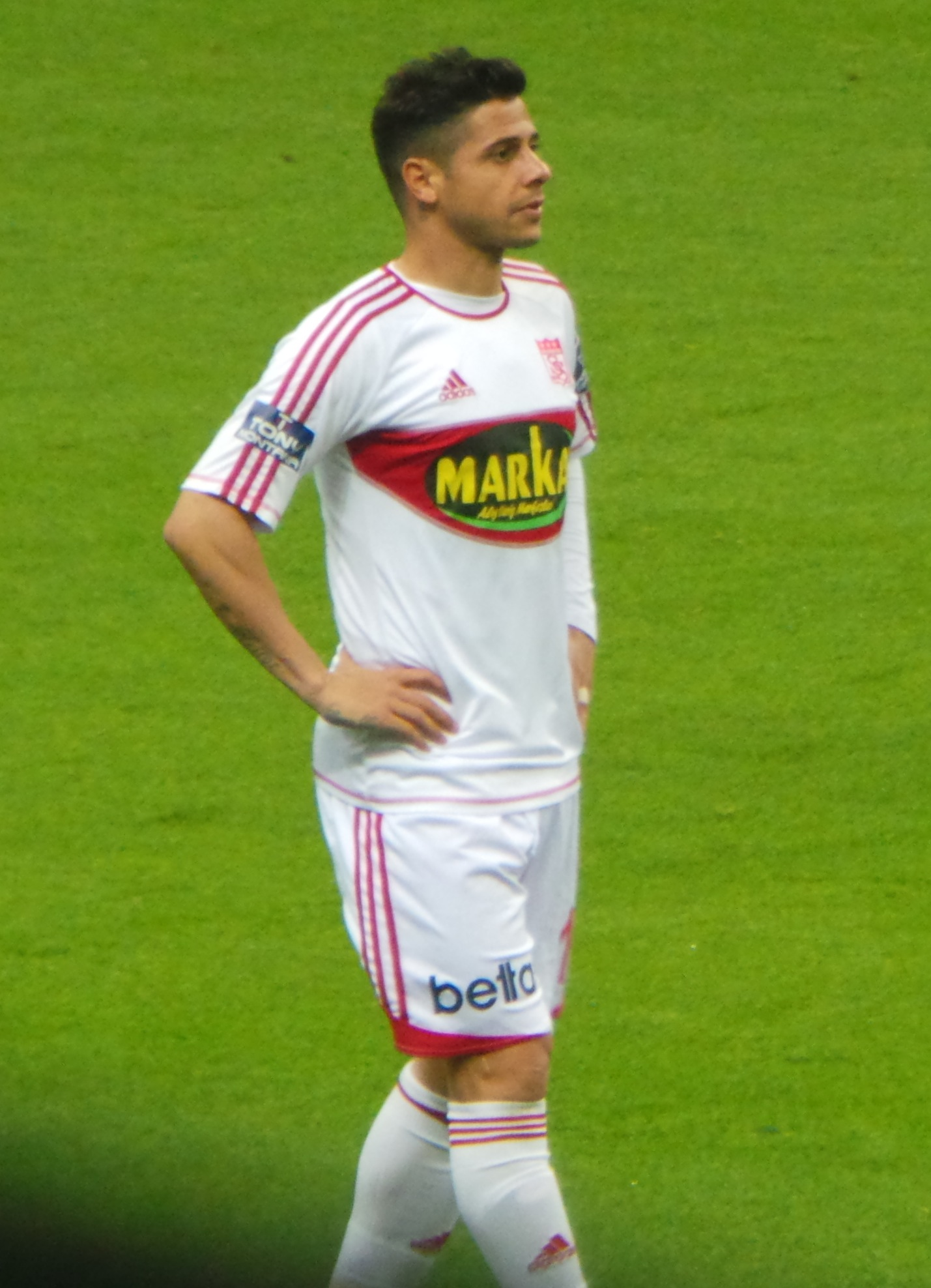
- Cicinho playing for Sivasspor in 2013

Personal information
- Full name: Cícero João de Cézare
- Date of birth: 24 June 1980 (age 46)
- Place of birth: Pradópolis, Brazil
- Height: 1.71 m (5 ft 7 in)
- Position: Right back

Senior career*
Years	Team	Apps	(Gls)
1999–2000	Botafogo-SP	2	(0)
2001–2003	Atlético Mineiro	59	(4)
2001	→ Botafogo (loan)	9	(2)
2004–2005	São Paulo	70	(12)
2005–2007	Real Madrid	26	(2)
2007–2012	Roma	62	(3)
2010	→ São Paulo (loan)	6	(0)
2011	→ Villarreal (loan)	6	(0)
2012–2013	Sport Recife	24	(0)
2013–2016	Sivasspor	90	(2)
2017–2018	Brasiliense	2	(0)
Total		354	(25)

International career
2005–2006	Brazil	15	(1)
- * Club domestic league appearances and goals

Cícero João de Cézare (born 24 June 1980), nicknamed Cicinho (Portuguese pronunciation: [siˈsĩɲu]), is a Brazilian retired professional footballer who played as a right back.

He had his breakthrough at São Paulo, where he was named in the 2005 Bola de Prata as the team won the Campeonato Paulista, Copa Libertadores and FIFA Club World Cup. He then spent most of his career with mixed successes at Real Madrid, Roma and Sivasspor. He suffered from alcoholism during his time in Europe.

Cicinho earned 15 caps for Brazil, winning the 2005 FIFA Confederations Cup and going to the 2006 FIFA World Cup.

== Club career ==
=== Early career ===
Born in Pradópolis, São Paulo, Cicinho began his career at Botafogo-SP before joining Atlético Mineiro, who loaned him to the Rio de Janeiro-based Botafogo. He won the Club World Cup in 2005 while playing for São Paulo.

=== Real Madrid ===
After an interview with Sir Alex Ferguson at Manchester United, Cicinho signed for Real Madrid on 23 August 2005, effective from the new year. He joined for an undisclosed fee and accompanied compatriots Ronaldo, Robinho, Júlio Baptista and Roberto Carlos, under Brazilian manager Vanderlei Luxemburgo.

He made his debut in La Liga on 8 January 2006, replacing the injured Ronaldo after 33 minutes in a goalless draw at Villarreal, and three weeks later, he scored his first goal to open a 2–1 win at Celta de Vigo. On 14 February, he scored after 57 seconds in a 4–0 win over Real Zaragoza in the semi-finals of the Copa del Rey, to no avail due to a 6–1 loss in the first round.

In September 2006, Cicinho suffered an extensive injury to his ACL and missed over six months. His comeback, to not only the pitch, but also the starting lineup, was on 29 April 2007, against Athletic Bilbao. He assisted Ruud van Nistelrooy's first goal with a cross, and played a part in the Dutchman's second goal in a 4–1 win.

In preparation for the 2007–08 season, Cicinho received less playing time under new coach Bernd Schuster. Michel Salgado and Sergio Ramos were used on the right during most of pre-season, and he therefore requested a transfer to A.S. Roma who had been following him for some time.

=== Roma ===
On 22 August 2007, Cicinho signed for Roma for a fee up to €11 million. Cicinho signed a five-year contract with the capital club worth from €3.6M in the first year up to €4 million in the last year (in gross salary, i.e. include tax), with additional bonuses.

He made his official debut in a Roma jersey on the first matchday of Serie A against Palermo, as a substitute for Ludovic Giuly in the second half. Roma went on to win the game 2–0.

On 9 February 2010, Cicinho joined São Paulo on loan until on 30 June 2010. This loan came after a 2009–10 season in which Cicinho received less playing time under new manager Claudio Ranieri in favor of Marco Cassetti and Marco Motta.

On 13 January 2011, he returned to Spain; this time joining Villarreal on loan until the end of the season.

In 2011–12 season Cicinho returned to Roma. He was the third choice for right back behind Marco Cassetti and Aleandro Rosi. He played only two matches in a 2011–12 season, first against Siena and second against Fiorentina in which he was a starter. His contract expired on 30 June, and he returned to Brazil.

=== Later career ===
Cicinho returned to Brazil after six years away on 21 June 2012, signing a one-year contract for Sport as part of president Gustavo Dubeux's promise to bring in a player who would be "greeted by the fans at the airport".

In July 2013, Cicinho signed with Turkish club Sivasspor, managed by his former club and international defensive partner Roberto Carlos. After one year, Cicinho had become a key player, and, in April 2014, he renewed his contract for two more years.

In September 2017, after over a year of unemployment, Cicinho signed with Brasiliense of Série D for the 2018 season. He rescinded his contract on 1 March, after two competitive games for the team from Brasília, due to a recurring knee injury.

== International career ==
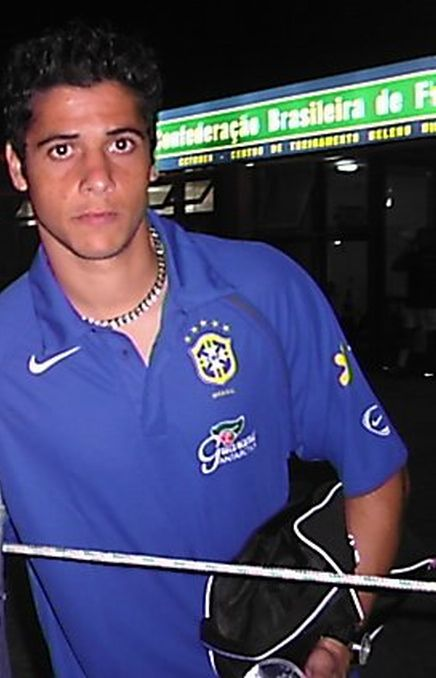
Cicinho representing Brazil

Cicinho made his debut for Brazil national team on 27 April 2005 in a 3–0 win over Guatemala at the Estádio do Pacaembu for Romário's testimonial match, assisting the opening goal by Ânderson.

He was called up for the 2005 FIFA Confederations Cup in Germany, with he and Léo replacing veteran full-backs Cafu and Roberto Carlos respectively. He played every match as Brazil won.

On 12 November 2005, Cicinho came on as a substitute for Cafú in a friendly against the United Arab Emirates in Abu Dhabi and scored his only international goal to cap an 8–0 victory.

He was one of the 23 players called up by Carlos Alberto Parreira to defend Brazil's crown in the 2006 FIFA World Cup in Germany. He made his tournament debut in the 4–1 group stage win over Japan, assisting one of Ronaldo's goals that made him the tournament's all-time top goalscorer. His one other appearance was in the 1–0 loss to France in the quarter-finals, as a late substitute for Cafú.

== Personal life ==
In addition to being Brazilian, he is also an Italian citizen, having a grandfather from Tione degli Abruzzi in Abruzzo whose last name was "De Cesare", then poorly transcribed as De Cézare by the registry office.

In 2012, Cicinho revealed that he was an alcoholic and smoker, and would have taken drugs were it not for doping tests in football. He told ESPN Brasil in 2016 that he smoked two packs of cigarettes a day. The following year, he confessed in a Fox interview that his addictions became a problem following his move to Real Madrid, and that he got more than 30 tattoos in a struggle to fight his depression.

== Career statistics ==
Appearances and goals by club, season and competition
Club	Season	League		Cup		Continental		Total	
Club	Season	Apps	Goals	Apps	Goals	Apps	Goals	Apps	Goals
Real Madrid	2005–06	19	2	4	1	1	0	24	3
Real Madrid	2006–07	7	0	0	0	1	0	8	0
Real Madrid	Total	26	2	4	1	2	0	32	3
Roma	2007–08	30	2	7	0	7	0	44	2
Roma	2008–09	22	1	2	0	5	0	31	1
Roma	2009–10	2	0	1	0	2	0	5	0
Roma	2010–11	6	0	1	0	2	0	9	0
Roma	2011–12	2	0	1	0	2	0	5	0
Roma	Total	62	3	12	0	18	0	91	3
São Paulo (loan)	2010	6	0	0	0	10	0	16	0
Villarreal (loan)	2010–11	6	0	1	0	0	0	7	0
Sport Recife	2012	24	0	0	0	0	0	24	0
Sivasspor	2013–14	31	1	6	1	0	0	37	2
Sivasspor	2014–15	30	1	3	0	0	0	33	1
Sivasspor	2015–16	27	0	0	0	0	0	27	0
Sivasspor	Total	88	2	9	1	0	0	97	3
Career total		198	7	26	2	30	0	243	8

== Honours ==
São Paulo

- Campeonato Paulista: 2005
- Copa Libertadores: 2005
- FIFA Club World Cup: 2005

Real Madrid

- La Liga: 2006–07

Roma

- Coppa Italia: 2007–08

Brazil

- FIFA Confederations Cup: 2005
