= Rovílson =

Brazilian footballer

Personal information
- Full name: Rovílson Liberato
- Date of birth: 7 January 1981 (age 45)
- Place of birth: Cajuru, Brazil
- Position: Left back

Senior career*
Years	Team	Apps	(Gls)
2001	América-SP		
2001	Palmeiras	17	(1)
2003	América-SP		
2004	Bragantino		
2005	Vila Nova		
2006	Londrina		
2007	Ferroviária		
- * Club domestic league appearances and goals as of 1 December 2023

Rovílson Liberato (born 7 January 1981), simply known as Rovílson, is a Brazilian former professional footballer who played as a left back.

== Career ==
Left back, Rovílson lived in his heyday at SE Palmeiras, during a dispute for the position with Misso. He also played for América-SP, Bragantino, Vila Nova, Londrina and Ferroviária. He ended his career due to recurring injuries.
