= Rovilson =

Rovilson or Rovílson is a given name. Notable people with the name include:

- Rovilson Fernandez (born 1973), American model, host and magazine editor
- Rovílson Liberato (born 1981), Brazilian footballer known as Rovílson
