= Ribamar Silva =

Brazilian politician (born 1975)

Member of the Chamber of Deputies
- Incumbent
- Assumed office 18 December 2024
- Preceded by: Ricardo Silva
- Constituency: São Paulo

Personal details
- Born: 27 May 1975 (age 51)
- Party: Social Democratic Party

Ribamar Antônio da Silva (born 27 May 1975) is a Brazilian politician serving as a member of the Chamber of Deputies since 2024. From 2017 to 2024, he was a municipal councillor of Osasco.
