= Ricardo Silva (politician) =

Brazilian politician (born 1985)

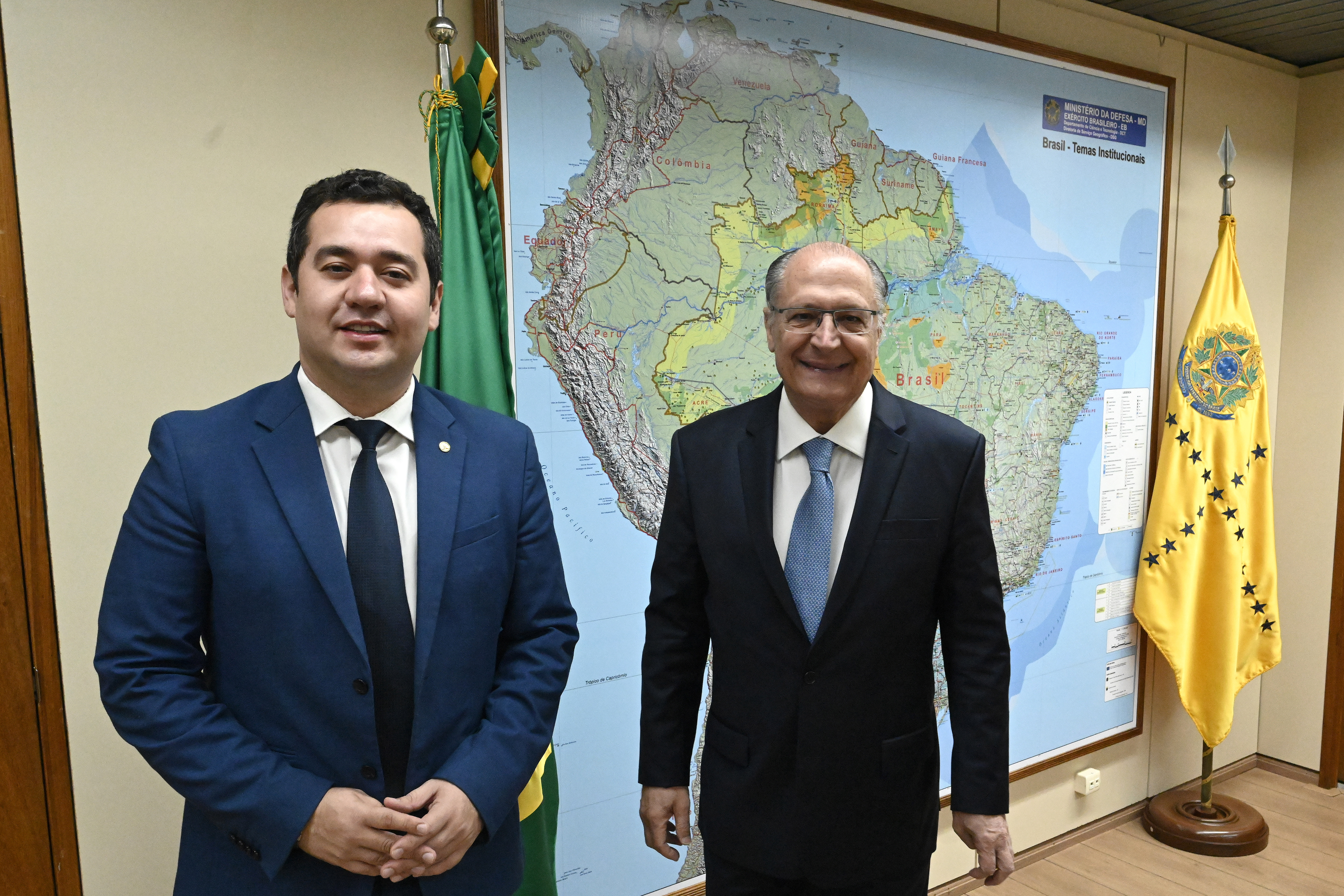
- Silva in 2023

Mayor of Ribeirão Preto
- Incumbent
- Assumed office 1 January 2025
- Preceded by: Duarte Nogueira

Member of the Chamber of Deputies
- In office 17 February 2020 – 1 January 2025
- Preceded by: Luiz Lauro Filho
- Succeeded by: Ribamar Silva
- Constituency: São Paulo

Personal details
- Born: 1 September 1985 (age 41)
- Party: Social Democratic Party (since 2022)
- Parent: Rafael Silva (father)

Ricardo Augusto Machado da Silva (born 1 September 1985) is a Brazilian politician serving as mayor of Ribeirão Preto since 2025. From 2020 to 2025, he was a member of the Chamber of Deputies.
