= Vila Tibério =

Vila Tibério (Portuguese for Tiberio Village) is a bairro (neighbourhood) located neighborhood in the Brazilian city of Ribeirão Preto, in the State of São Paulo.

The neighborhood is between the neighborhoods of Sumarézinho (north), Jardim Antártica (northwest), Vila Virgínia (south) and Campos Elísios (northeast). E. E. Dona Sinhá Junqueira and Nossa Senhora do Rosário are two of the most well-known landmarks.

== History ==
The area where today Vila Tibério is located was a donation from Tibério Augusto Garcia de Senne, surveyor by profession. Tiberio Augusto married in 1890 with Deolinda Franco, daughter of the then owner of the area, Colonel João Franco de Moraes Octávio.

Tibério Augusto has divided the land that extends from the vicinity of the Mogiana Station to where the campus of Ribeirão Preto is located at the University of São Paulo.

The remainder of the area of the farm, excluding the area that was formerly donated to Tibério Augusto Garcia de Senne, was Monte Alegre Farm, whose golden period was during the 1920s when the "Coffee King", Colonel Francisco Schmidt, was its owner.

The farm also went through other area reductions due to inheritance divisions, and was finally purchased by the Brazilian Federal Government in the late 1930s.
