= Duarte Nogueira =

Brazilian politician (born 1964)

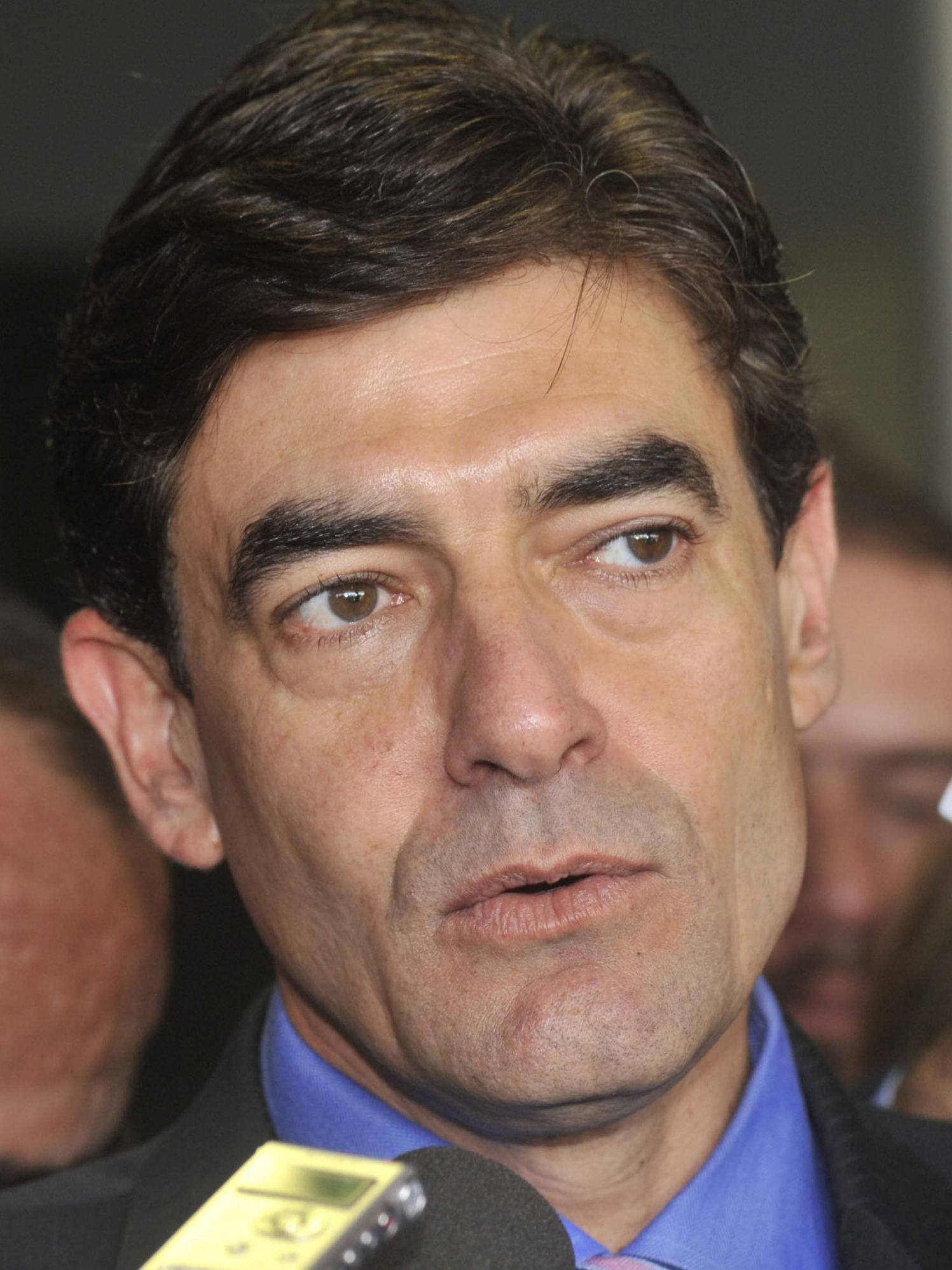
- Nogueira in 2011

Mayor of Ribeirão Preto
- In office 1 January 2017 – 31 January 2024
- Preceded by: Gláucia Berenice
- Succeeded by: Ricardo Silva

Personal details
- Born: 16 May 1964 (age 62)
- Party: Social Democratic Party (since 2025)
- Parent: Antônio Duarte Nogueira (father)

Antônio Duarte Nogueira Júnior (born 16 May 1964) is a Brazilian politician. From 2017 to 2024, he served as mayor of Ribeirão Preto. From 2007 to 2016, he was a member of the Chamber of Deputies. From 1995 to 2007, he was a member of the Legislative Assembly of São Paulo. He is the son of Antônio Duarte Nogueira.
