= Misso (footballer) =

Brazilian footballer (born 1973)

Personal information
- Full name: Jardemílson Góes de Melo
- Date of birth: 15 August 1973 (age 53)
- Place of birth: Penedo, Brazil
- Height: 1.70 m (5 ft 7 in)
- Position: Left-back

Youth career
- 1991–1993: Bahia

Senior career*
Years	Team	Apps	(Gls)
1993–1996	Bahia		
1996	→ Fluminense de Feira (loan)		
1997	Mogi Mirim		
1997	Taubaté		
1998–1999	Mogi Mirim		
1999	Ponte Preta		
2000–2001	Botafogo		
2001–2002	Palmeiras	19	(0)
2003	Botafogo		
- * Club domestic league appearances and goals

Jardemílson Góes de Melo (born 15 August 1973), better known as Misso, is a Brazilian former professional footballer who played as a left-back.

== Career ==
Formed in Bahia's youth categories, Misso stood out in football in the interior of São Paulo, playing for Mogi Mirim and Ponte Preta, being hired by Botafogo and Palmeiras in the early 2000s. Due to irregularities, he ended up not establishing himself, and retired early.

== Honours ==
Bahia

- Campeonato Baiano: 1994
