= Bonfim Paulista =

District of the city of Ribeirão Preto

Coordinates: 21°16′S 47°49′W

Bonfim Paulista is a district of the city of Ribeirão Preto. It is located at 16km from the district center and 299km from São Paulo. It has 20,000 inhabitants. Its neighboring cities are Cravinhos and Guatapará.

== History ==
It was founded on February 10, 1894, being official on October 3, 1902, but the settlement already existed since 1850.

In 1906 the first school was built and inaugurated the sub-town-hall, being José Luciano de Andrade, the first sub-mayor. Also in 1906, the first Telephonic Center was installed in Bonfim Square.

== Old Denominations ==
- Viaducto (Viaduct)
- Gaturamo
- Vila Bonfim (Bonfim Village)
- Bonfim Paulista

== Notable people ==
- Cel. Américo Baptista da Costa – farmer
- Cel. Emílio Moreno de Alagão – farmer
- Cel. Furquim – farmer
- João Pedro da Veiga Miranda – engineer and skilful politician (was alderman, Ribeirão Preto mayor in 1908, state deputy and federal deputy, and finally Navy Minister from 1922 to 1924).
- Dr. Francisco Cunha Junqueira – politician (Agriculture Secretary in 1928).
- Da. Iria Alves da Cunha Junqueira – farmer (she had one of the biggest coffee farms in the beginning of the 20th century).
