= Dumont, São Paulo =

Municipality in the state of São Paulo in Brazil

Dumont
- Municipality
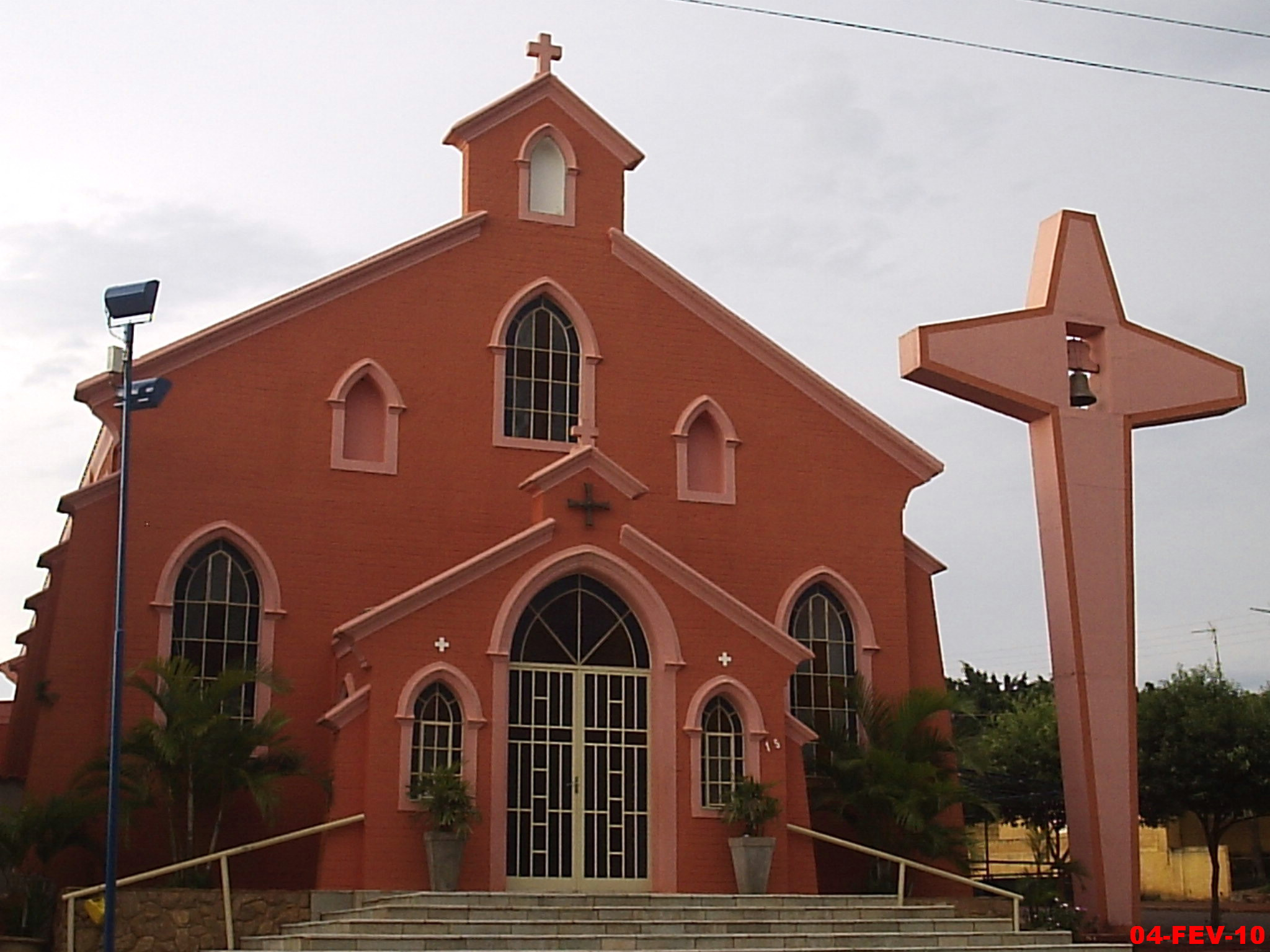
- Church in Dumont

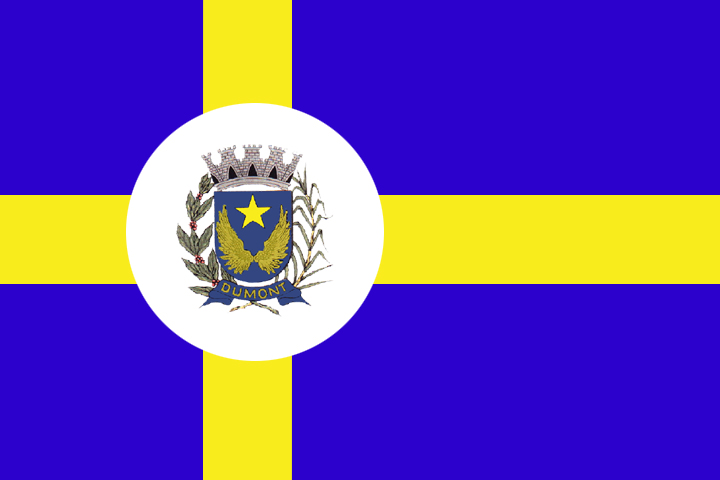
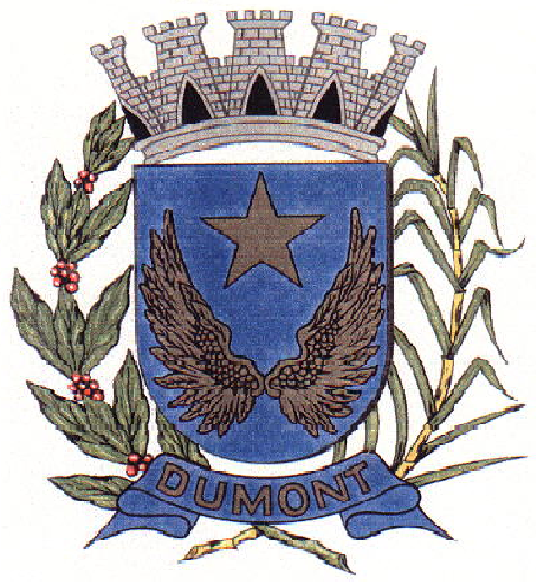
- Flag Coat of arms

- Location in São Paulo state

- Location in Brazil
- Coordinates: 21°14′11″S 47°58′24″W
- Country: Brazil
- Region: Southeast
- State: São Paulo

Area
  - Total: 111 km^{2} (43 sq mi)

Population (2020)
  - Total: 10,023
  - Density: 90.3/km^{2} (234/sq mi)
- Time zone: UTC−3 (BRT)

Dumont is a municipality in the state of São Paulo in Brazil. The population is 10,023 (2020 est.) in an area of 111 km^{2}. The elevation is 595 m. It is named in honor of aviation pioneer Alberto Santos-Dumont.

== Demography ==
Census / IBGE data - 2016

Total Population: 8,143

- Urban: 7.854
- Rural: 289
  - Men: 4,096
  - Woman: 4,047

Population Density (people/km^{2}): 56.92

Infant mortality up to 1 years old (per thousand): 13.27

Life expectancy (years): 72.67

Fertility rate (children per woman): 2.11

Literacy rate: 90.44%

Human Development Index (HDI): 0.802

- HDI Income: 0.742
- HDI Longevity: 0.794
- HDI Education: 0.871

(Source: IBGE)

== Media ==
In telecommunications, the city was served by Telecomunicações de São Paulo. In July 1998, this company was acquired by Telefónica, which adopted the Vivo brand in 2012. The company is currently an operator of cell phones, fixed lines, internet (fiber optics/4G) and television (satellite and cable).

== See also ==
- List of municipalities in São Paulo
- Interior of São Paulo
