= Bonfim, Minas Gerais =

Bonfim
- Municipality
- The Municipality of Bonfim
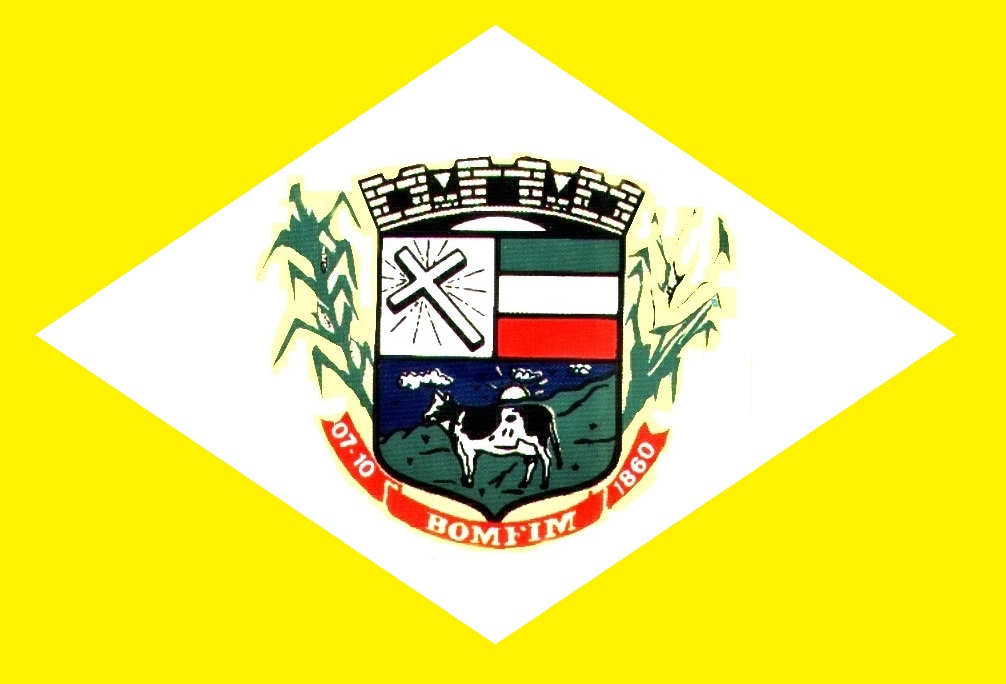
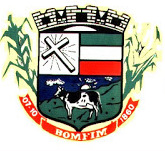
- Flag Coat of arms

- Location of Bonfim in Minas Gerais
- Coordinates: 20°19′37″S 44°14′20″W
- Country: Brazil
- Region: Southeast
- State: Minas Gerais
- Founded: October 7, 1860

Government
  - Mayor: Dejair César Ribeiro Campos (PMDB)

Area
  - Total: 301.210 km^{2} (116.298 sq mi)
- Elevation: 930 m (3,050 ft)

Population (2022 Census)
  - Total: 7,434
  - Estimate (2025): 7,710
- Time zone: UTC−3 (BRT)
- HDI (2000): 0.715 – medium

Bonfim is a municipality in the Brazilian state of Minas Gerais.

== See also ==
- List of municipalities in Minas Gerais
