= Teatro Popular do SESI =

Theatre in São Paulo

- Interactive map of the Teatro Popular do SESI area

General information
- Location: Av. Paulista, 1313; Jardins, São Paulo, Brazil
- Coordinates: 23°33′46.8″S 46°39′16.74″W

Teatro Popular do SESI is a theatre in São Paulo, Brazil. Almost Nothing premiered here in 2003.
