= Bonfim (Carira) =

Village in Sergipe, Brazil

- Village
- Location of Carira in Sergipe

- Location within Brazil
- Coordinates: 10°25′31″S 37°47′47″W
- Country: Brazil
- State: Sergipe
- Municipality: Carira
- Elevation: 245 m (804 ft)
- Population (2022): 171

Bonfim is a village in the municipality of Carira, state of Sergipe, in northeastern Brazil. As of 2022, it had a population of 171. The name "Bonfim" comes from "senhor do bonfim".

== See also ==
- List of villages in Sergipe
