= Guatapará =

- Municipality
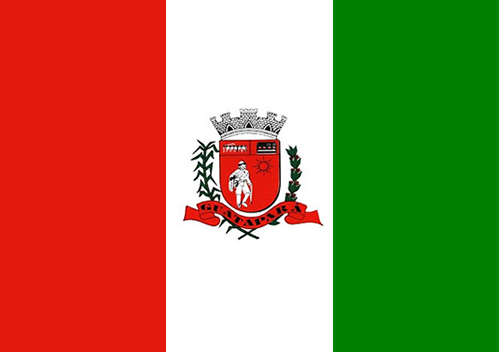
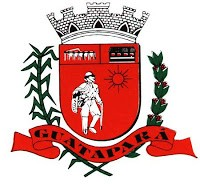
- Flag Coat of arms

- Location in São Paulo state

- Location in Brazil
- Coordinates: 21°29′48″S 48°2′16″W
- Country: Brazil
- Region: Southeast
- State: São Paulo

Area
  - Total: 414 km^{2} (160 sq mi)

Population (2020)
  - Total: 7,709
  - Density: 18.6/km^{2} (48.2/sq mi)
- Time zone: UTC−3 (BRT)

Guatapará is a municipality in the state of São Paulo in Brazil. The population is 7,709 (2020 est.) in an area of 414 km^{2} (160 sq mi). The elevation is 512 metres (1,680 ft).

== Media ==
In telecommunications, the city was served by Centrais Telefônicas de Ribeirão Preto. In December 2000, this company was acquired by Telefónica, which adopted the Vivo brand in 2012. The company is currently an operator of cell phones, fixed lines, internet (fiber optics/4G) and television (satellite and cable).

== See also ==
- List of municipalities in São Paulo
- Interior of São Paulo
