= Cajuru =

Municipality in the state of São Paulo in Brazil

- Municipality
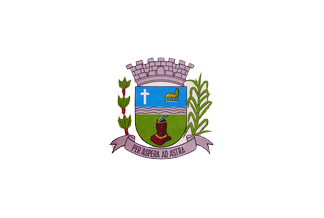
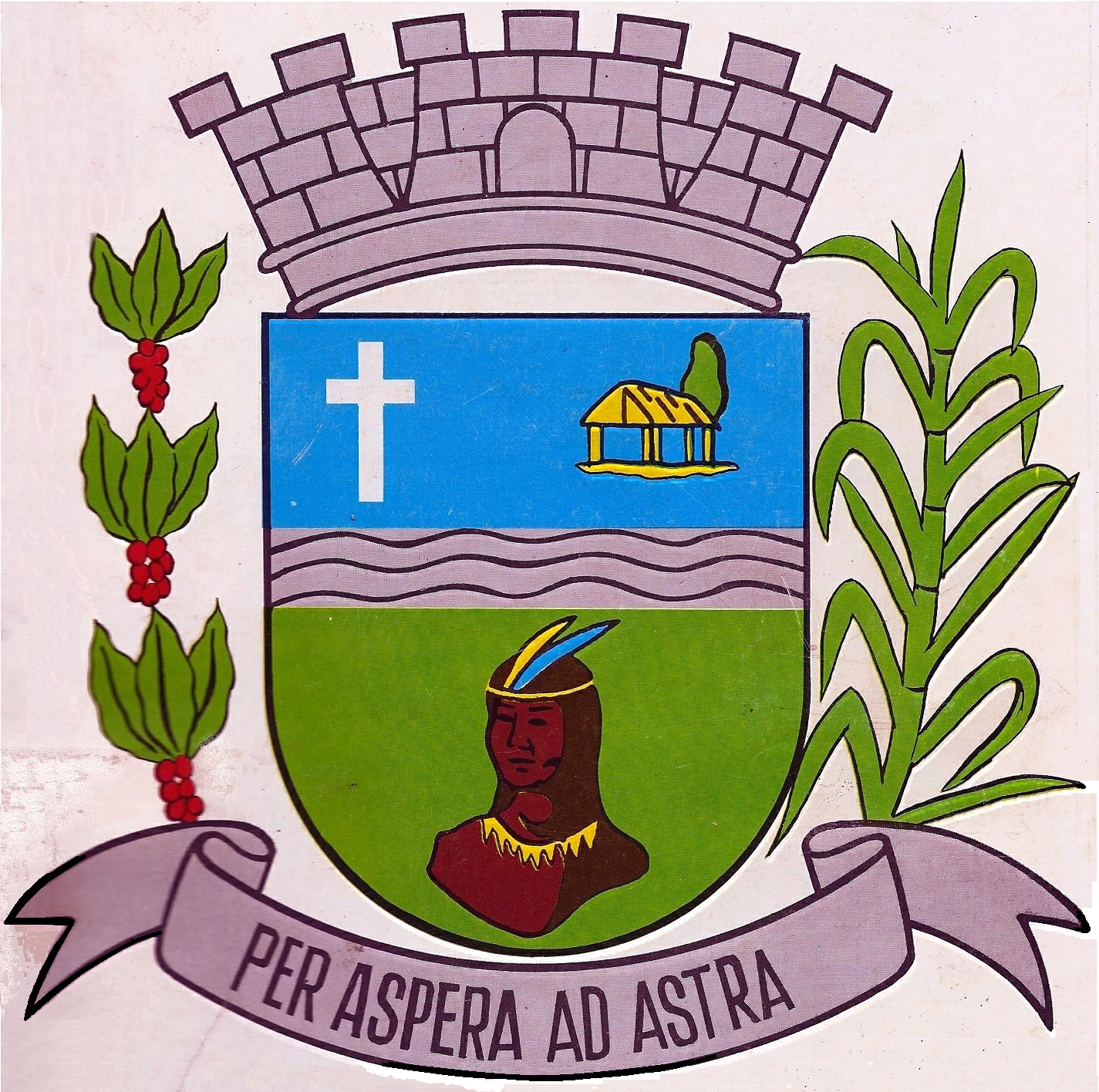
- Flag Coat of arms

- Location in São Paulo state

- Location in Brazil
- Coordinates: 21°16′31″S 47°18′15″W
- Country: Brazil
- Region: Southeast
- State: São Paulo

Area
  - Total: 660 km^{2} (250 sq mi)

Population (2020)
  - Total: 26,393
  - Density: 40/km^{2} (100/sq mi)
- Time zone: UTC−3 (BRT)
- Website: www.cajuru.sp.gov.br

Cajuru is a municipality in the state of São Paulo in Brazil. The estimated population was 26,393 in 2020, in an area of 660 km^{2}. The elevation is 775 m.

== See also ==
- List of municipalities in São Paulo
- Interior of São Paulo
