= 2007 Ballon d'Or =

Football award

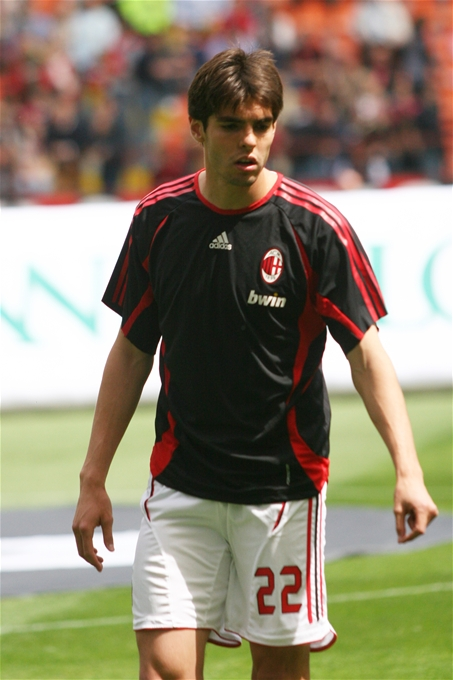
- 2007 Ballon d'Or winner, Kaká
- Date: 2 December 2007
- Location: Paris, France
- Country: France
- Presented by: France Football

Highlights
- Won by: (Brazil) Kaká (1st award)
- Website: ballondor.com

The 2007 Ballon d'Or (lit. '2007 Golden Ball'), given to the best football player in the world given out by France Football and UEFA and judged by an international panel of sports journalists, was awarded to Kaká. This was the first year in which players from clubs outside the UEFA federation were eligible for nomination; this change also led to an increase in the voting pool to include journalists from outside UEFA countries.

Kaká was the fourth Brazilian national to win the award after Ronaldo (1997, 2002), Rivaldo (1999), and Ronaldinho (2005). He was the sixth AC Milan player to win the trophy after Gianni Rivera (1969), Ruud Gullit (1987), Marco van Basten (1988, 1989, 1992), George Weah (1995), and Andriy Shevchenko (2004).

The ceremony is notable as Kaká was the last player to win the Ballon d'Or before the Messi–Ronaldo dominance of the award. In 2018, Croatian Luka Modrić ended the 10-year dominance following his win that year.

== Rankings ==
Rank	Player	Nationality	Club(s)	Points
1	Kaká	Brazil	(Italy) AC Milan	444
2	Cristiano Ronaldo	Portugal	(England) Manchester United	277
3	Lionel Messi	Argentina	(Spain) Barcelona	255
4	Didier Drogba	Ivory Coast	(England) Chelsea	108
5	Andrea Pirlo	Italy	(Italy) AC Milan	41
6	Ruud van Nistelrooy	Netherlands	(Spain) Real Madrid	39
7	Zlatan Ibrahimović	Sweden	(Italy) Inter Milan	31
8	Cesc Fàbregas	Spain	(England) Arsenal	27
9	Robinho	Brazil	(Spain) Real Madrid	24
10	Francesco Totti	Italy	(Italy) Roma	20
11	Frédéric Kanouté	Mali	(Spain) Sevilla	19
12	Ronaldinho	Brazil	(Spain) Barcelona	18
13	Steven Gerrard	England	(England) Liverpool	17
14	Juan Román Riquelme	Argentina	(Spain) Villarreal (Argentina) Boca Juniors	15
15	Dani Alves	Brazil	(Spain) Sevilla	14
16	Filippo Inzaghi	Italy	(Italy) AC Milan	12
17	Franck Ribéry	France	(France) Marseille (Germany) Bayern Munich	10
18	Paolo Maldini	Italy	(Italy) AC Milan	8
19	Gianluigi Buffon	Italy	(Italy) Juventus	7
19	Petr Čech	Czech Republic	(England) Chelsea	7
19	Gennaro Gattuso	Italy	(Italy) AC Milan	7
19	Thierry Henry	France	(England) Arsenal (Spain) Barcelona	7
19	Clarence Seedorf	Netherlands	(Italy) AC Milan	7
24	Fabio Cannavaro	Italy	(Spain) Real Madrid	5
24	Michael Essien	Ghana	(England) Chelsea	5
26	Wayne Rooney	England	(England) Manchester United	4
27	Iker Casillas	Spain	(Spain) Real Madrid	3
27	Rogério Ceni	Brazil	(Brazil) São Paulo	3
29	Younis Mahmoud	Iraq	(Qatar) Al-Gharafa	2
30	Guillermo Ochoa	Mexico	(Mexico) América	1
30	Dimitar Berbatov	Bulgaria	(England) Tottenham Hotspur	1
30	Samuel Eto'o	Cameroon	(Spain) Barcelona	1
30	Ryan Giggs	Wales	(England) Manchester United	1
30	Carlos Tevez	Argentina	(England) West Ham United (England) Manchester United	1
30	Robin van Persie	Netherlands	(England) Arsenal	1
36	Eric Abidal	France	(France) Lyon (Spain) Barcelona	0
36	David Beckham	England	(Spain) Real Madrid (United States) LA Galaxy	0
36	Deco	Portugal	(Spain) Barcelona	0
36	Mahamadou Diarra	Mali	(Spain) Real Madrid	0
36	Diego	Brazil	(Germany) Werder Bremen	0
36	Miroslav Klose	Germany	(Germany) Werder Bremen (Germany) Bayern Munich	0
36	Florent Malouda	France	(France) Lyon (England) Chelsea	0
36	Shunsuke Nakamura	Japan	(Scotland) Celtic	0
36	Ricardo Quaresma	Portugal	(Portugal) Porto	0
36	Raúl	Spain	(Spain) Real Madrid	0
36	Paul Scholes	England	(England) Manchester United	0
36	Luca Toni	Italy	(Germany) Bayern Munich	0
36	Kolo Touré	Ivory Coast	(England) Arsenal	0
36	Fernando Torres	Spain	(Spain) Atlético Madrid (England) Liverpool	0
36	David Villa	Spain	(Spain) Valencia	0
