= New Maradona =

Title given to Argentine footballers

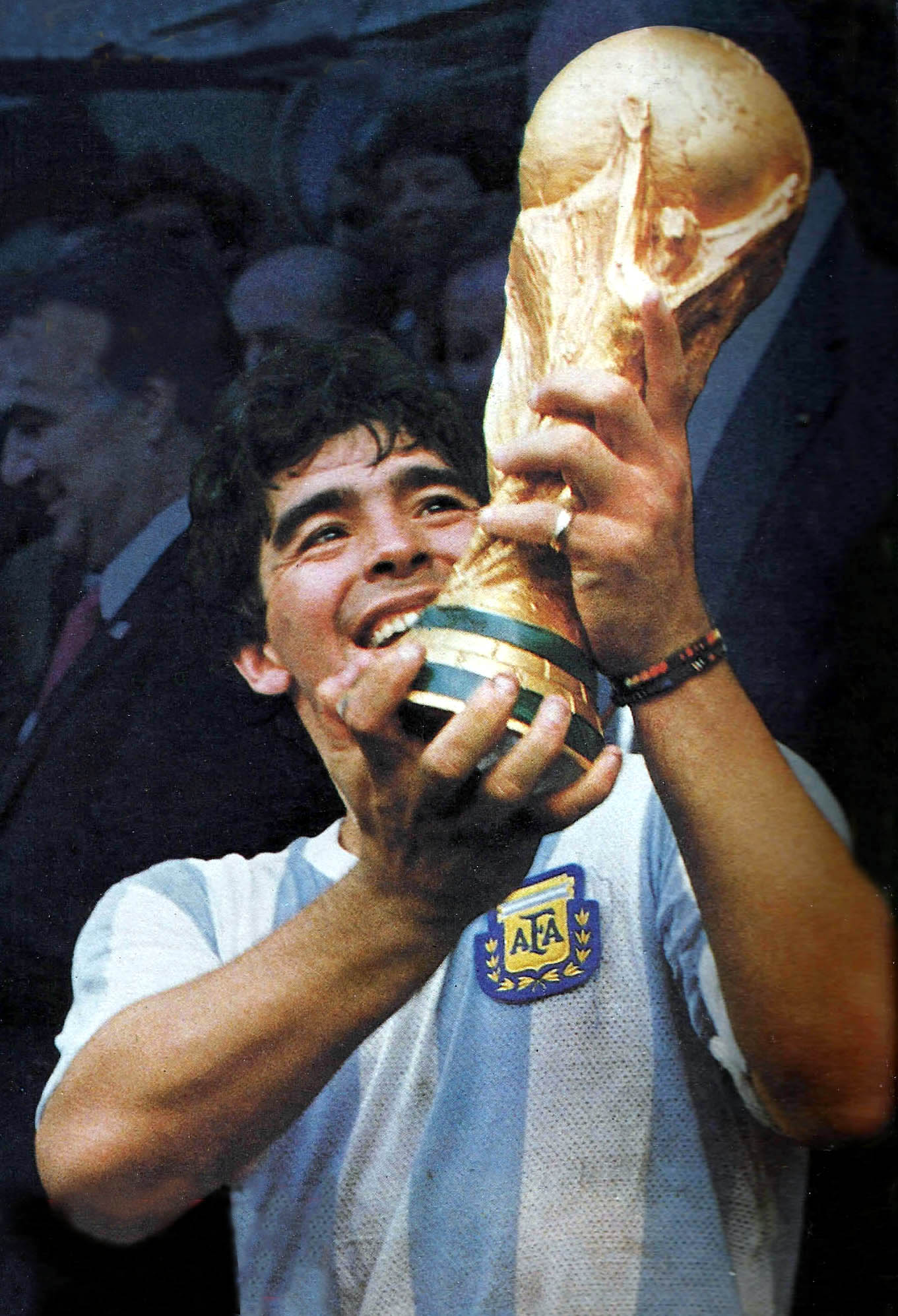
Maradona during winning the 1986 FIFA World Cup with Argentina

New Maradona or New Diego was a title given by the press and public to promising Argentine football players in reference (and reverence) to Diego Maradona as a benchmark. Since Maradona retired, fans had been anticipating someone to lead the Argentina national team to a World Cup final, like Maradona did in 1986 and 1990. As a consequence, very talented youngsters were quickly labeled as the “New Maradona. Originally it was Diego Latorre who was said to be the New Maradona”. Since then, a number of top-draw Argentine footballers have been slated as the New Maradona. The likes of Ariel Ortega, Pablo Aimar, Gabriel Batistuta and Javier Saviola all had been said to be the “New Maradona” early on in their career, but none of them could live up to the expectations.

In recent years, the title has been retired as Lionel Messi captained Argentina to three FIFA World Cup finals in 2014, 2022 and 2026. Just like Maradona did in 1986, he captained Argentina to World Cup glory in 2022 and, in doing so cemented himself, alongside Maradona as an national icon.

== Lionel Messi ==
=== Career comparisons ===
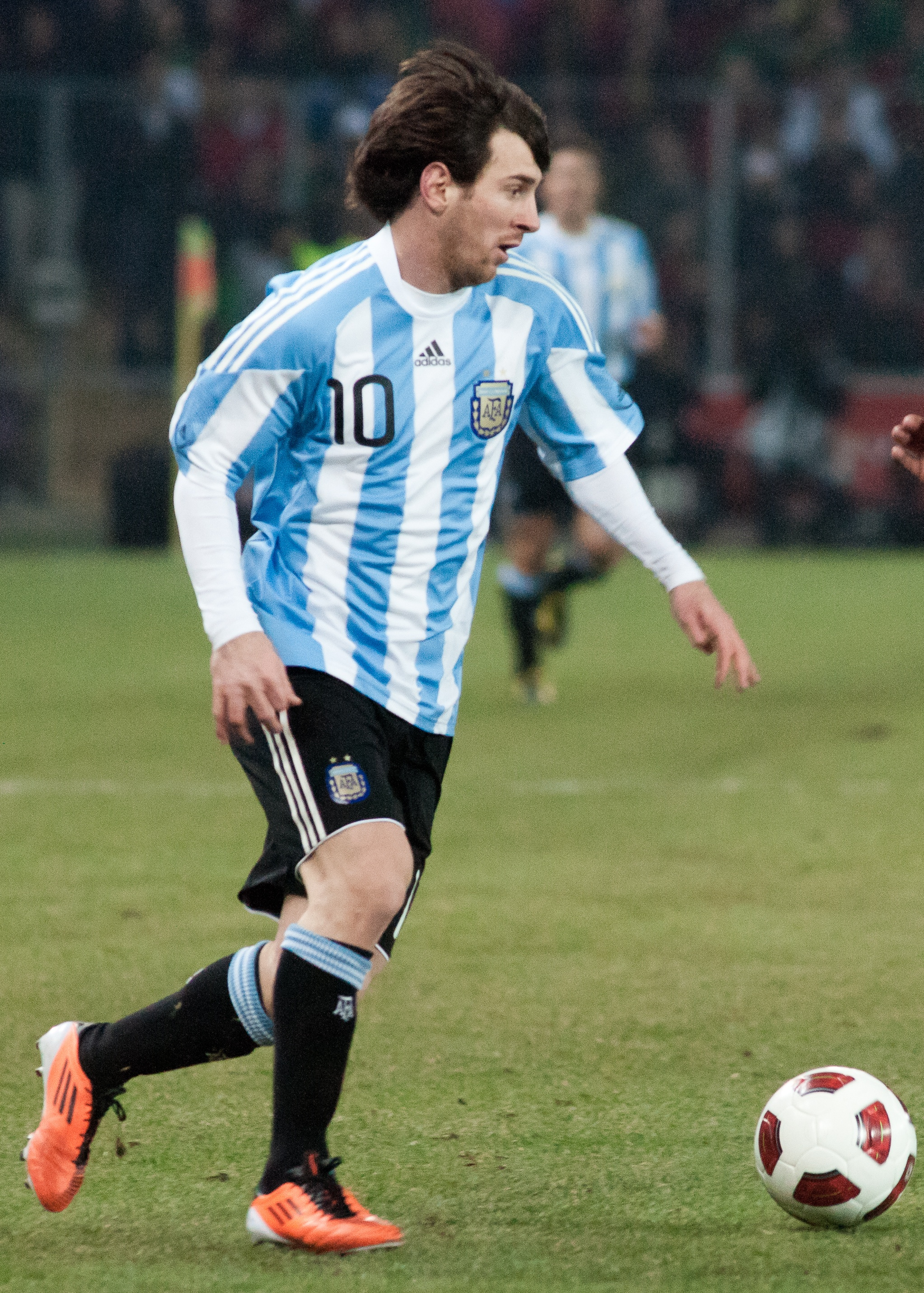
Lionel Messi has been named as the "New Maradona" by Maradona himself.

Lionel Messi has universally been considered as Maradona's successor, which earned him the title, an assertion supported by Maradona himself. Like Maradona, Messi won the FIFA World Youth Championship, in 2005 with Argentina, and won the Golden Ball. Coincidentally, both players made their national debut against Hungary. Messi would make his debut in the FIFA World Cup in 2006 against Serbia and Montenegro, coming on as a substitute in the 74th minute. Maradona, who was in attendance, was shown erupting with joy as Messi entered the pitch. Messi would provide a goal and an assist, becoming the youngest World Cup goalscorer in Argentinian history. On October 14, 2006, in a match against Recreativo Huelva, Lionel Messi scored a goal with his hand, which made people draw comparisons to the Hand of God goal scored by Maradona against England in the 1986 FIFA World Cup.

Already frequently compared to Maradona, Messi proved their similarity when he nearly replicated two of his most famous goals in 2007. On 18 April, he scored a goal against Getafe CF, which was very similar to Maradona's Goal of the Century, scored against England in the 1986 World Cup. The world's sports press exploded with Maradona comparisons, and the Spanish press labeled Messi "Messidona". Two months later, on 9 June, in a league match against RCD Espanyol, Messi scored a goal using his hand, which drew comparisons to the Hand of God goal scored by Maradona in the same World Cup match. On 12 March 2013, in a Champions League match against A.C. Milan, Messi scored a goal that once again drew further comparisons between himself and Maradona due to the similarity with Maradona's famous goal against Greece in the 1994 FIFA World Cup.

As his career progressed, Messi proved his similarity beyond all previous contenders to the "New Maradona" moniker, establishing himself as the best player Argentina had produced since Maradona. Lionel Messi went on to inherit Maradona's number 10 shirt and the prestigious role as captain for Argentina. Messi would first wear the number 10 jersey and for one game the captain's armband at an international tournament in the 2010 World Cup, under Maradona's coaching, the latter became thoroughly impressed with the former's skills. Maradona gave him Messi blessing to wear the shirt, saying "The No 10 is yours. There's nobody better than you to wear it". Jorge Valdano, who won the World Cup with Maradona, said in October 2013, "Messi is Maradona every day. For the last five years, Messi has been the Maradona of the World Cup in Mexico." César Menotti, who as manager orchestrated their 1978 World Cup victory, echoed this sentiment when he opined that Messi plays "at the level of the best Maradona". Other notable Argentines in the sport such as Diego Simeone and Javier Zanetti expressed their belief between 2012 and 2013 that Messi had already overtaken Maradona as the best player in the nation's history.

In the 2014 FIFA World Cup, Messi captained Argentina. During the tournament, Messi's passionate celebration after scoring the match-winning goal against Bosnia and Herzegovina was compared to Maradona's famous goal celebration against Greece in 1994. Furthermore, images surfaced which compared the heavy marking both players faced by the opposition defence at the World Cup. Like Maradona in 1986, Messi also made the most successful dribbling runs of any other player throughout the 2014 tournament, and knocked out Belgium on the way to the final, drawing further comparisons between the two players. It was Argentina's first final since Maradona had last brought them there as captain in 1990, where Argentina were once again defeated 1–0 by Germany. Like Maradona in 1986, Messi was involved in the vast majority of Argentina's goals, and was awarded the Golden Ball as the tournament's best player, scoring four goals and providing an assist. With this achievement, Maradona and Messi are the only players to win the Golden Ball at both the FIFA U-20 World Cup and FIFA World Cup, with Maradona doing so in 1979 and 1986, while Messi managed the same feat in 2005 and in 2014. However, his selection as the winner of the Golden Ball drew criticism due to his lack of goals in the knockout round; Maradona suggested that Messi had undeservedly been chosen for marketing purposes.

Messi would captain Argentina to the finals of the 2015 Copa América and the 2016 Copa América Centenario, both they would lose to Chile on penalties. His perceived uneven performances drew criticism from pundits, critics, and even Maradona himself. Losing three consecutive finals in three consecutive years caused Messi to briefly retire from international football. Maradona asked Messi to reverse his decision, stating "those saying he should quit don't want us to see what a disaster Argentine football has become. Messi must go on. Messi has to stay because he will reach the 2018 World Cup in Russia in conditions to become world champion." A subsequent nationwide campaign would make Messi reverse his decision.

In Argentina's final group match of the 2018 FIFA World Cup against Nigeria at the Krestovsky Stadium, Saint Petersburg on 26 June, Messi scored the opening goal in an eventual 2–1 victory, becoming the third Argentine after Diego Maradona and Gabriel Batistuta to score in three different World Cups. In the round of 16 match against France on 30 June, Messi set up Gabriel Mercado's and Sergio Agüero's goals in a 4–3 defeat, which saw Argentina eliminated from the World Cup. With his two assists in his team's second round fixture, Messi became the first player to provide two assists in a match for Argentina since Diego Maradona had managed the same feat against South Korea in 1986.

The 2019 Copa América tournament would end with Argentina ending third. Following Argentina's 2–0 semi-final defeat to hosts Brazil on 2 July, Messi was critical of the refereeing, and alleged the competition was "set up" for Brazil to win. In the third-place match against Chile, Messi was sent off along with Gary Medel in the 37th minute of play, after being involved in an altercation with the Chilean defender. It would be only the second straight red card he received on the national team, after the one he received during his debut. Following the match, Messi refused to collect his medal, and implied in a post-match interview that his comments following the semi-final led to his sending off. These actions drew praise from Maradona himself, saying he liked seeing this "rebellious" side to Messi.

On 25 November 2020, at the age of 60, Maradona suffered cardiac arrest and died in his sleep at his home in Dique Luján, Buenos Aires Province, Argentina. Four days later on 29 November, Messi scored Barcelona's fourth goal in their 4–0 home victory over Osasuna. After scoring, he unveiled a shirt of his former side Newell's Old Boys, in tribute to Maradona, and raised both hands to the screen showing Maradona's face in the stadium. The shirt was a number 10 replica of the same one Maradona had worn during his stint with the club in 1993.

Messi would lead Argentina to a victory over hosts Brazil 1–0 in the 2021 Copa América final. This gave Messi his first major international title and Argentina's first since 1993. The win also marked his nation's joint record 15th Copa América overall, in a tournament that Maradona had never won. The 2022 FIFA World Cup saw Messi finally matching Maradona's achievement of winning the tournament after Argentina defeated France in the final in a 4–2 penalty shoot-out victory after a 3–3 draw in extra-time. Not only had Messi scored in the final, which Maradona had never done, but had done so twice in that match. He would tie Maradona's records for World Cup appearances (21) and goals (8) during a 2–0 group stage match against Mexico, and would finish the tournament as Argentina's leader in both. It also marked Messi's fifth World Cup tournament, surpassing Maradona's four.

=== Style of play similarities ===
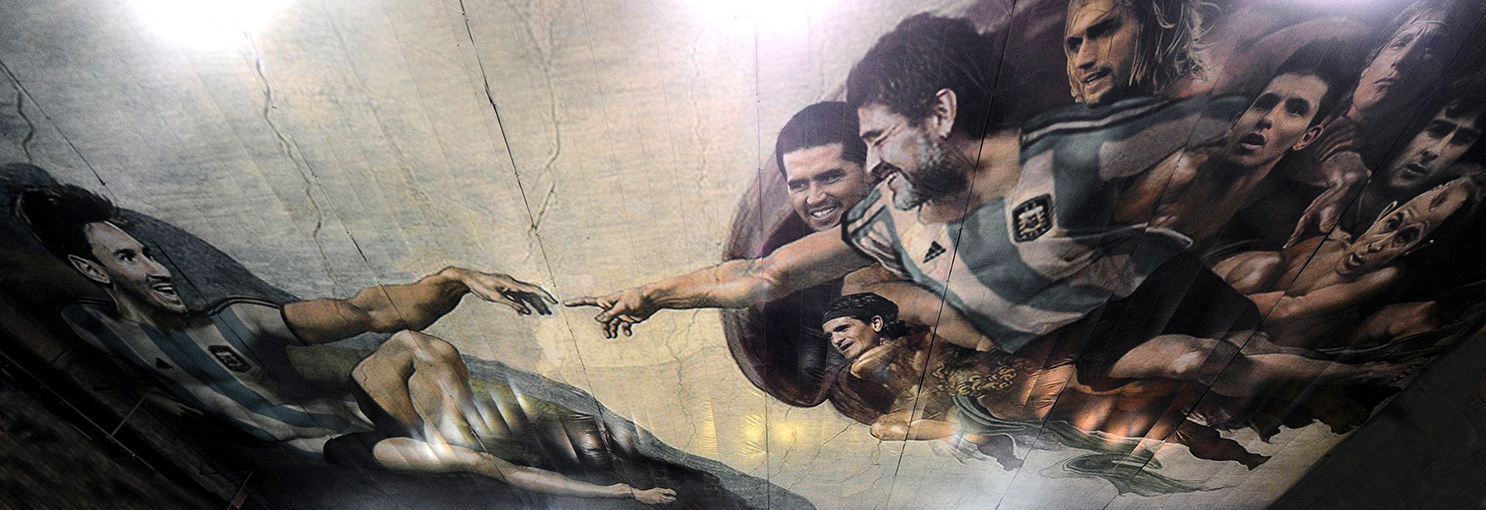
The Sistine Chapel of Football painting (Messi to the left, Maradona to the right), on the ceiling of a sports club, Sportivo Pereyra, in Barracas, Buenos Aires

Messi has been compared to Maradona due to their similar playing style, skill set, and short stature. Their lower centre of gravity allows them to be more agile and change direction more quickly, helping them to evade tackles, and their short legs allow them to excel in short bursts of acceleration, and to keep control of the ball when dribbling at speed. Both players have played and worn the number 10 shirt for Barcelona and also for the Argentina national team, and like Maradona before him, Messi is also predominantly a left footed player. Messi's passing, dribbling, vision, eye for goal and playmaking ability have also drawn comparisons to Maradona. Although Messi is regarded as being a more offensive player for Barcelona, he has also played in a more similar position to Maradona, in particular for Argentina, where he is predominantly used as an attacking midfielder, as a deep-lying forward, or as a winger, rather than as a striker or as a false-9.

Like Maradona, Messi is also an accurate set piece and penalty kick taker. Maradona helped Messi enhance his free kick techniques, helping Messi become a regular free kick taker at both club and international levels, and one of the world's best free kick takers. With regard to his dribbling ability and ball control, Maradona said of Messi: "The ball stays glued to his foot; I've seen great players in my career, but I've never seen anyone with Messi's ball control."

=== Reception in Argentina ===
"Messi has always lived in the shadow of Diego Maradona, the leader of our last World Cup-winning team in 1986. He could never escape the similarities. They are both No. 10s, both the best players in the world, both left footed and both capable of magical, extraordinary moments. And yet they were very different in terms of personality ... people were always looking for a leader like Maradona and Messi wasn't that person."

— compatriot Osvaldo Ardiles reflecting on the expectations that Messi faced in comparison to Maradona.

During the early and middle parts of his career, Messi was generally held in lesser esteem than Maradona in Argentine society. Part of this had to do with Messi's lack of tournament success and perceived uneven output with the national team during this period – Maradona had famously led Argentina to victory in the 1986 FIFA World Cup with a dominant overall performance, which set expectations for Messi to do the same. Also unlike Maradona, Messi never played in the Argentine Primera División, therefore depriving his countrymen a chance to watch him develop and prove himself, and through no fault of his own would do this overseas in La Liga instead. His lack of outward passion for the Albiceleste shirt, early tendency not to sing the national anthem, and disinclination to emotional displays have in the past led to the false perception that he felt more Catalan rather than truly Argentine. However, despite having lived in Barcelona since age 13, Messi rejected the option of representing Spain internationally, saying: "Argentina is my country, my family, my way of expressing myself. I would change all my records to make the people in my country happy."

Another factor for the Argentine preference for Maradona over Messi was the differences between the two in personality, class and background. Maradona was an extroverted, fiery and controversial character who rose to greatness from the slums, all character traits that many Argentines identified as being representative of their national values. In contrast, Messi could be seen as the antithesis of his predecessor: introverted, reserved and unassuming, with a comparably unremarkable upbringing in Rosario. Several pundits and footballing figures would point to this temperament to question Messi's leadership capabilities for the national team, especially in contrast to Maradona's. Maradona himself once echoed these sentiments, stating that he did not believe that Messi had the personality to be a leader.

Football journalist Tim Vickery stated that Messi's perception among Argentines changed from 2019 to 2021, with Messi making a conscious effort to become "more one of the group, more Argentine". Several pundits noted that Messi had grown more assertive as a leader during the 2019 Copa América by becoming more vocal with his teammates both on and off the pitch, finally singing the national anthem with the team before matches, and speaking with journalists at length after matches, the latter of which he rarely did for Barcelona. The red card he was shown after a shoving match during the third-place match, and subsequent outburst during the post-game conference where he criticized the organization of the tournament, were cited as examples of Messi's new mindset. Longtime Argentina teammate Ángel Di María said that despite tournament loss continuing Argentina's long trophy drought, it revealed "a new Messi" that was leading the national team.

Following the World Cup tournament victory for Messi and Argentina, Vickery felt that Messi would now be held in the same esteem as, and perhaps even higher than Maradona by his compatriots. Valdano saw an edge to Messi's performances, which he described as a "Maradonian" streak. Compatriot Osvaldo Ardiles highlighted Messi's provoking actions against the Netherlands during the quarter-final of the 2022 World Cup, particularly when Messi goaded the Dutch bench after scoring a penalty, and snapped at one of the players during the post-game conference. He stated that these actions were very unlike Messi but "more of a Maradona reaction," which in turn caused the people of Argentina to love him more. Messi himself remarked that the World Cup win "won over all the people of Argentina. Today 95% or 100% of Argentines love me and that's a beautiful feeling."

== List of players once thought to be the "New Maradona" ==
(Listed in alphabetical order by surname)

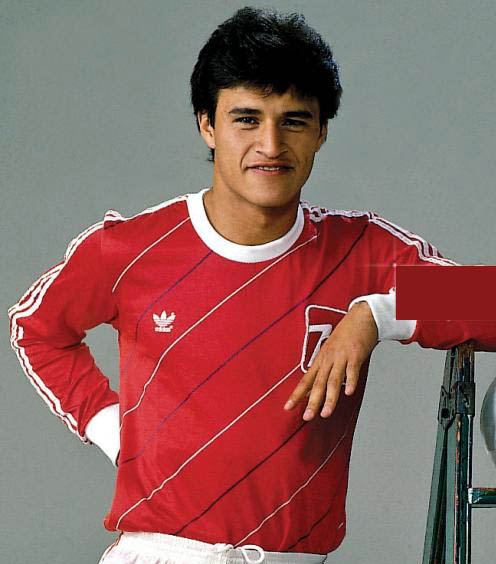
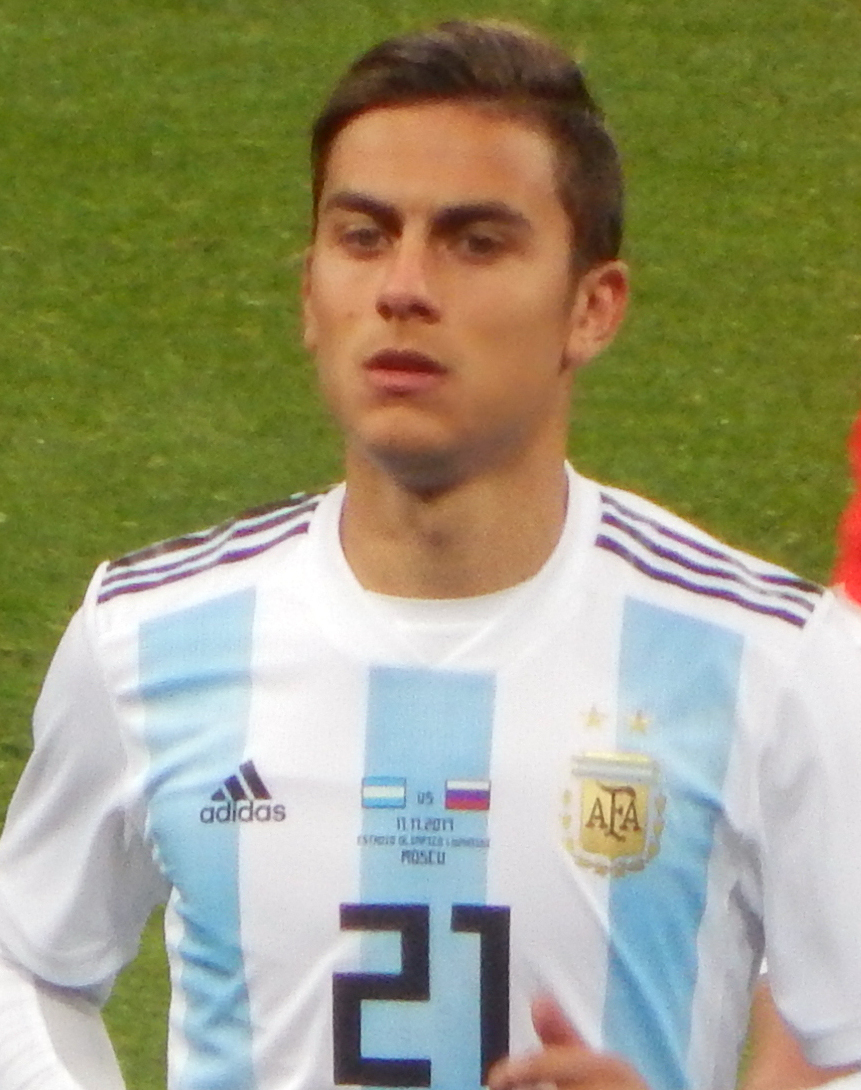
Claudio Borghi (left) and Paulo Dybala were some of the players labeled the "New Maradona".
- Sergio Agüero
- Pablo Aimar
- Pablo Arriagada
- Claudio Borghi
- Andrés D'Alessandro
- Ángel Di María
- Franco di Santo
- Paulo Dybala
- Marcelo Gallardo
- Diego Latorre
- Ezequiel Lavezzi
- Carlos Marinelli
- Ariel Ortega
- Juan Román Riquelme
- Javier Saviola
- Carlos Tevez

=== Comparisons to Maradona ===
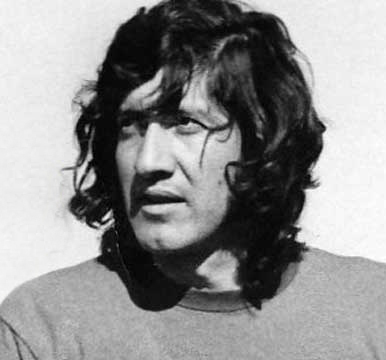
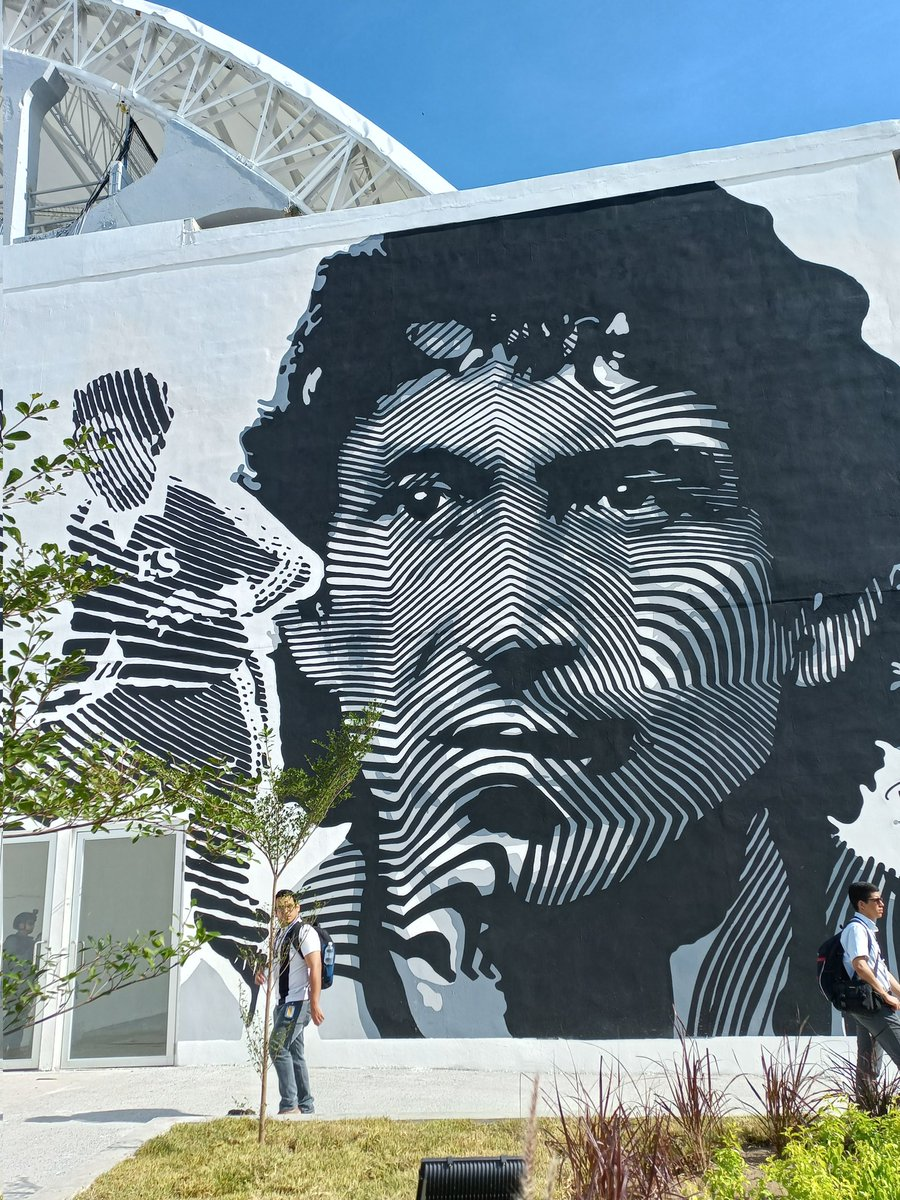
Tomás Carlovich (left) and Mágico González are players "Maradona" praised as better than himself.
- Saeed Al-Owairan
- Roberto Baggio
- Milan Baroš
- Tomás Carlovich
- Antonio Cassano
- Alfredo Di Stéfano
- Paulo Futre
- Paul Gascoigne
- Mágico González
- Eiður Guðjohnsen
- Gheorghe Hagi
- Vasilis Hatzipanagis
- Lorenzo Insigne
- Ali Karimi
- Mario Kempes
- Khvicha Kvaratskhelia
- Dries Mertens
- Fabrizio Miccoli
- Domenico Morfeo
- Jay-Jay Okocha
- Abedi Pele
- Hugo Sánchez
- Omar Sívori
- Dragan Stojković
- Matt Le Tissier
- Mirko Vučinić
- Gianfranco Zola
