= Sistine Chapel of Football =

Artwork exhibited at the Sportivo Pereyra club to honor several Argentinian footballers

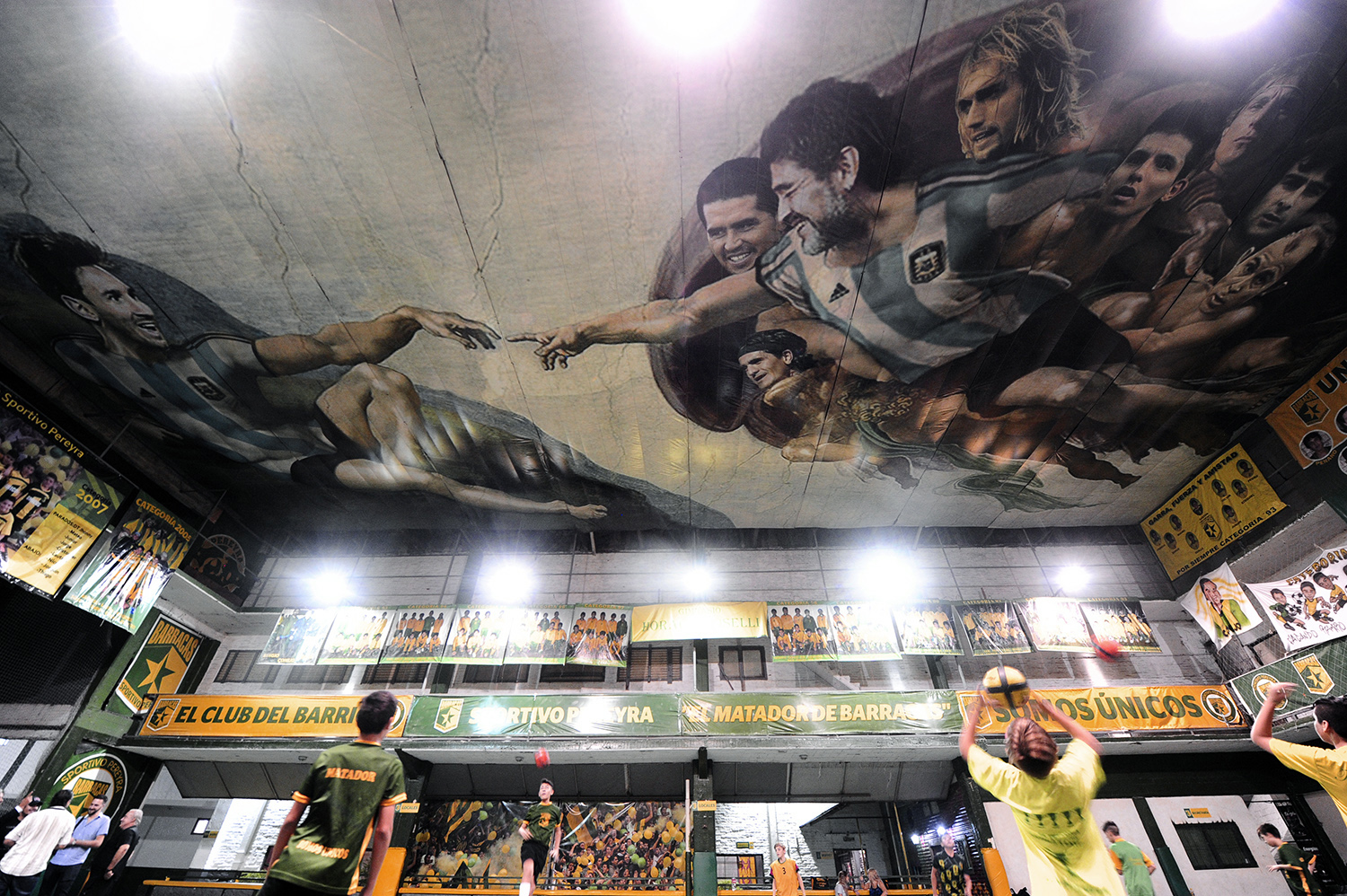
The painting on the ceiling was inspired by The Creation of Adam and depicts Lionel Messi and Diego Maradona at the front, with other notable footballers such as Juan Román Riquelme, Gabriel Batistuta, Mario Kempes, Sergio Agüero, Claudio Caniggia, Ricardo Bochini and Ariel Ortega at the background

The Sistine Chapel of Football (also known as "The Creation of Football") is an artwork exhibited at the Sportivo Pereyra club from Barracas in Buenos Aires, Argentina. It honors two Argentine footballers, Lionel Messi and Diego Maradona, as well as other notable Argentine players including Juan Román Riquelme, Gabriel Batistuta, Mario Kempes, Sergio Agüero, Claudio Caniggia, Ricardo Bochini and Ariel Ortega.

Inspired by Michelangelo's classic fresco, The Creation of Adam found in the Sistine Chapel in Rome, it was created in 2014 by the Argentine graphic designer and artist Santiago Barbeito (aka Santuke). The artwork gained popularity in mid 2018, when a video filmed by an amateur went viral on social media.

== History ==
In 2014, the club authorities decided to paint the ceiling of the main indoor pitch. Initially, the first idea was to recreate a sky with clouds but then a new proposal would emerge that included Messi, Maradona and other historical representatives of Argentine football. "For us this is a sacred temple of football and what better way to express it with a suitable ceiling, one like the Sistine Chapel," Ricardo Elsegood, the club's head coach told local media.

== Characteristics ==
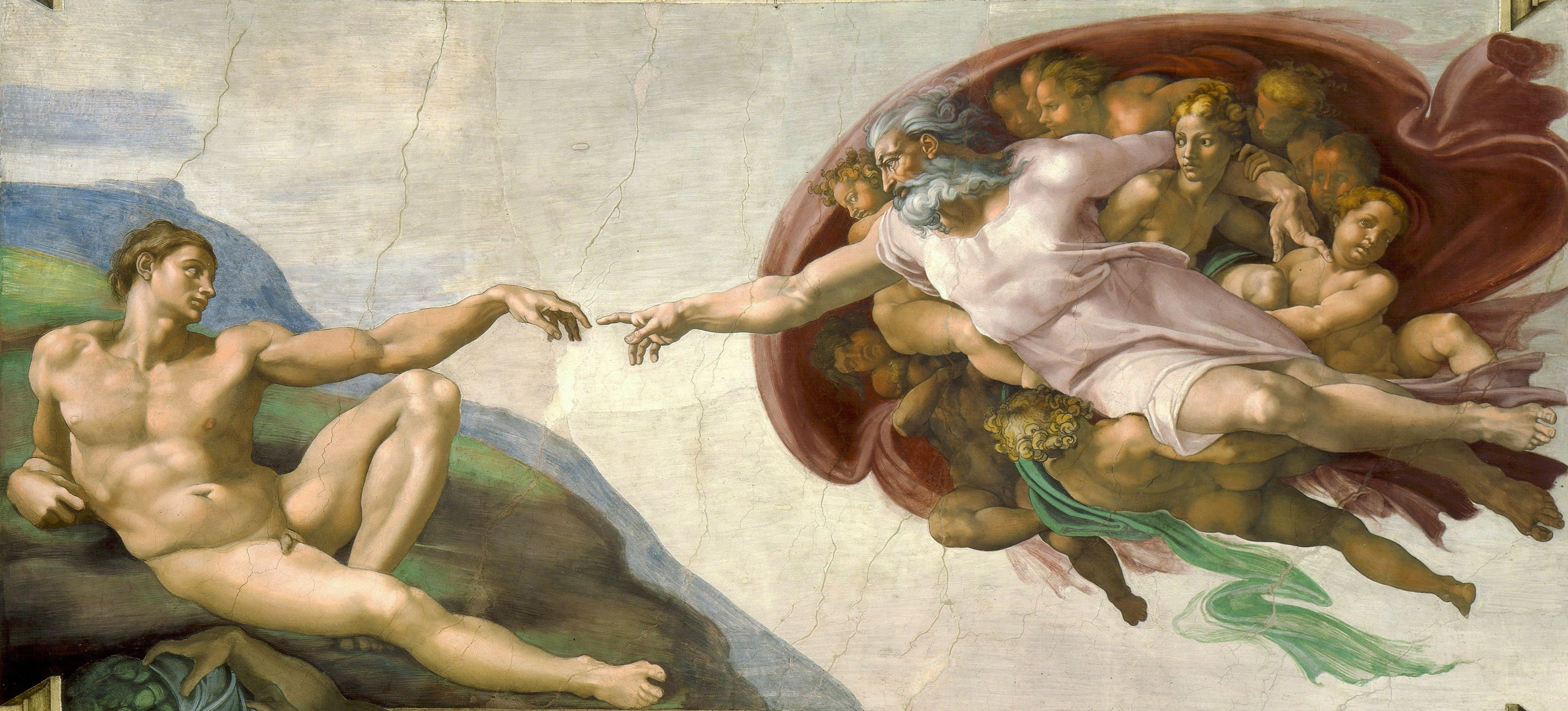
The Creation of Adam was the inspiration for the painting

In this recreation of the fresco by Michelangelo, Lionel Messi represents Adam and Diego Maradona acts as God, while the cherubs who complete the scene are Juan Román Riquelme, Gabriel Batistuta, Mario Kempes, Sergio Agüero, Claudio Caniggia, Ricardo Bochini and Ariel Ortega. “It is like Maradona grants Messi the legacy of good football,” explained Santiago Barbeito, author of the artwork.

The artwork is a digital photomontage printed on eight stretched canvases that reach approximately 500 m².

Produced through donations, its cost is valued at around $20,000 USD.

== The club ==
Sportivo Pereyra club is located on 2785 Alvarado Street in Barracas, a neighbourhood of Buenos Aires, a few blocks away from La Bombonera, the stadium owned by Boca Juniors, one of Argentina's top football clubs.

Renowned players like Mauro Boselli and Juan Manuel Iturbe have emerged from this club.
