= The Creation of Adam =

Fresco by Michelangelo on the Sistine Chapel ceiling

- Creazione di Adamo (Italian)
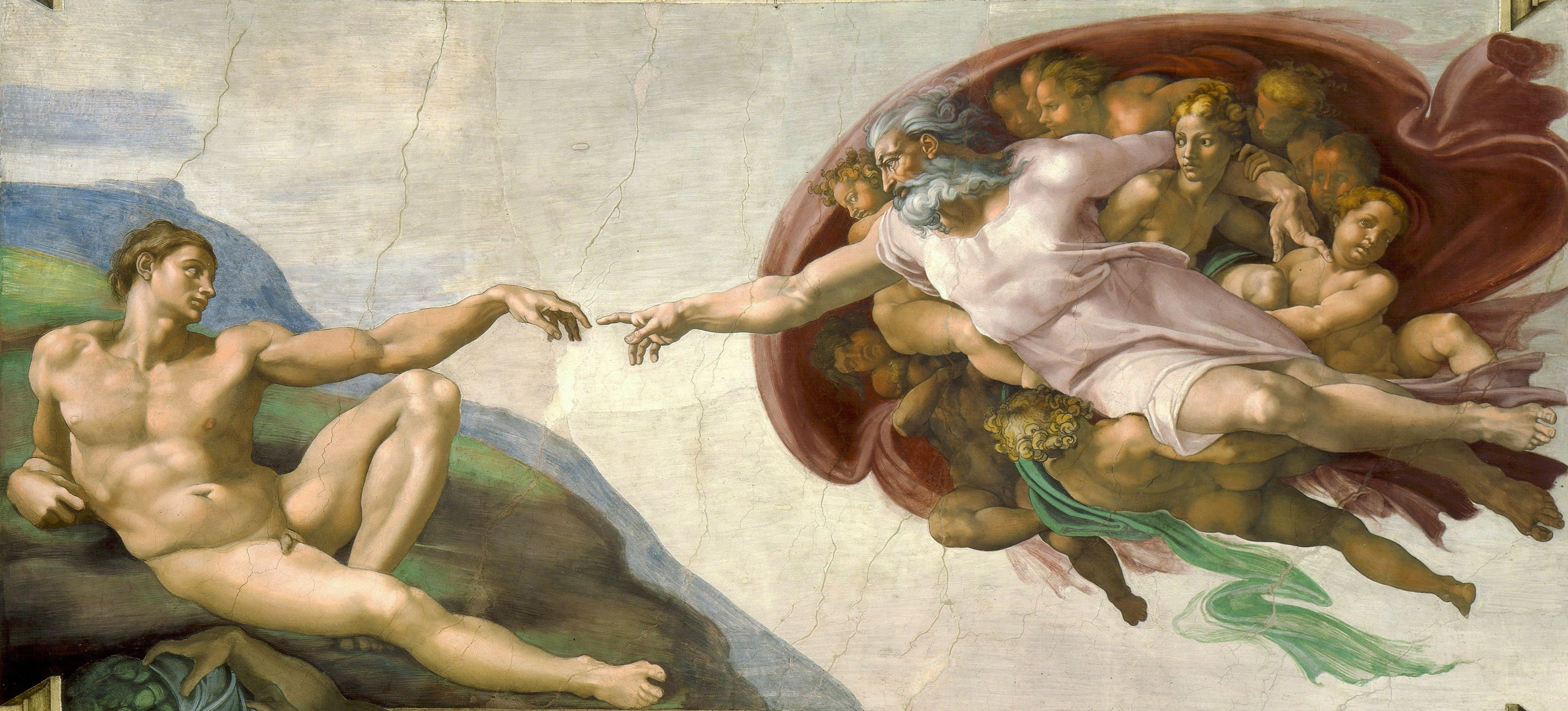
- Artist: Michelangelo
- Year: c. 1512
- Type: Fresco
- Medium: Ceiling plaster
- Subject: Genesis creation narrative
- Dimensions: 280 cm × 570 cm (9 ft 2 in × 18 ft 8 in)
- Location: Sistine Chapel, Vatican City

The Creation of Adam (Italian: Creazione di Adamo), also known as The Creation of Man, is a fresco painting by Italian artist Michelangelo, which forms part of the Sistine Chapel's ceiling, painted 1508–1512. It illustrates the Biblical creation narrative from the Book of Genesis in which God gives life to Adam, the first man. The fresco is part of a complex scheme and is chronologically the fourth in the series of panels depicting episodes from Genesis.

The painting has been reproduced in countless imitations and parodies. Michelangelo's Creation of Adam is one of the most replicated religious paintings of all time.

== History ==
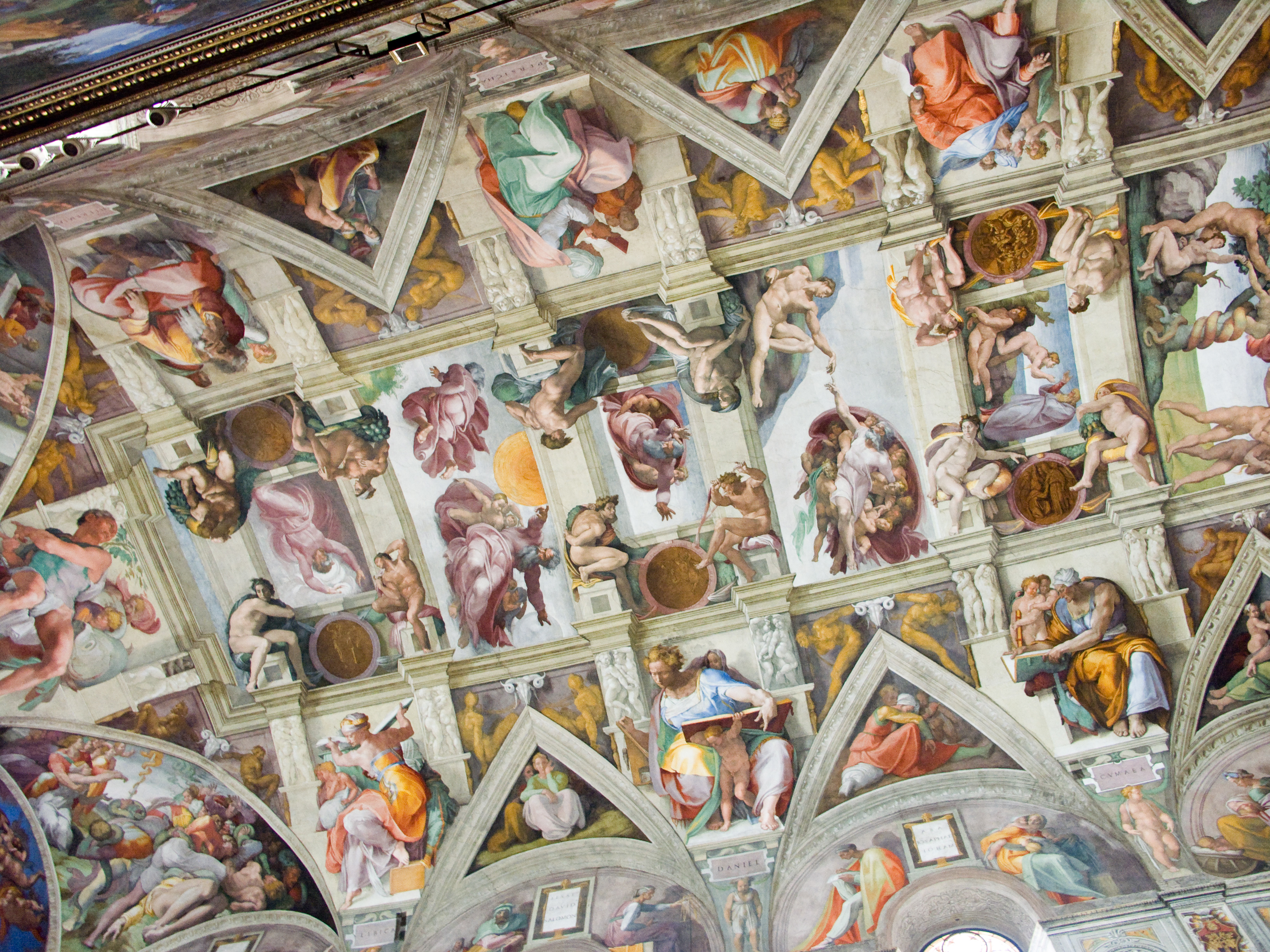
Michelangelo painted the ceiling of the Sistine Chapel; the work took approximately four years to complete (1508–1512). Between (top and bottom respectively) The Creation of Eve and Separation of Land and Water this fresco can be seen.

In 1505, Michelangelo was invited back to Rome by the newly elected Pope Julius II. He was commissioned to build the Pope's tomb, which was to include forty statues and be finished in five years.

Under the patronage of the Pope, Michelangelo experienced constant interruptions to his work on the tomb in order to accomplish numerous other tasks. Although Michelangelo worked on the tomb for 40 years, it was never finished to his satisfaction. It is located in the Church of S. Pietro in Vincoli in Rome and is most famous for his central figure of Moses, completed in 1516. Of the other statues intended for the tomb, two known as the Heroic Captive / Rebellious Slave and the Dying Captive / Dying Slave, are now in the Louvre.

During the same period, Michelangelo painted the ceiling of the Sistine Chapel, which took approximately four years to complete (1508–1512). According to Condivi's account, Bramante, who was working on the building of St Peter's Basilica, resented Michelangelo's commission for the Pope's tomb and convinced the Pope to commission him in a medium with which he was unfamiliar, in order that he might fail at the task.

Michelangelo was originally commissioned to paint the Twelve Apostles on the triangular pendentives that supported the ceiling, and cover the central part of the ceiling with ornament. Michelangelo persuaded Pope Julius to give him a free hand and proposed a different and more complex scheme, representing the Creation, the Fall of Man, the Promise of Salvation through the prophets, and the genealogy of Christ. The work is part of a larger scheme of decoration within the chapel which represents much of the doctrine of the Catholic Church.

The composition stretches over 45 ft. × 128 ft. (more than 500 square metres) of ceiling, and contains over 300 figures. At its centre are nine episodes from the Book of Genesis, divided into three groups: God's creation of the world; God's creation of man and his fall from God's grace; and lastly, the state of humanity and sin as represented by Noah and his family. On the pendentives supporting the ceiling are painted twelve men and women who prophesied the coming of Jesus; seven prophets of Israel (Joël, Ezekiel, Jonah, Daniel, Jeremiah, Zechariah, and Isaiah) and five Sibyls (Erythraean, Delphic, Libyan, Cumaean, and Persian), prophetic women of the Classical world. Among the most famous paintings on the ceiling are The Creation of Adam, Adam and Eve in the Garden of Eden, the Deluge, the Prophet Jeremiah and the Cumaean Sibyl.

== Composition ==
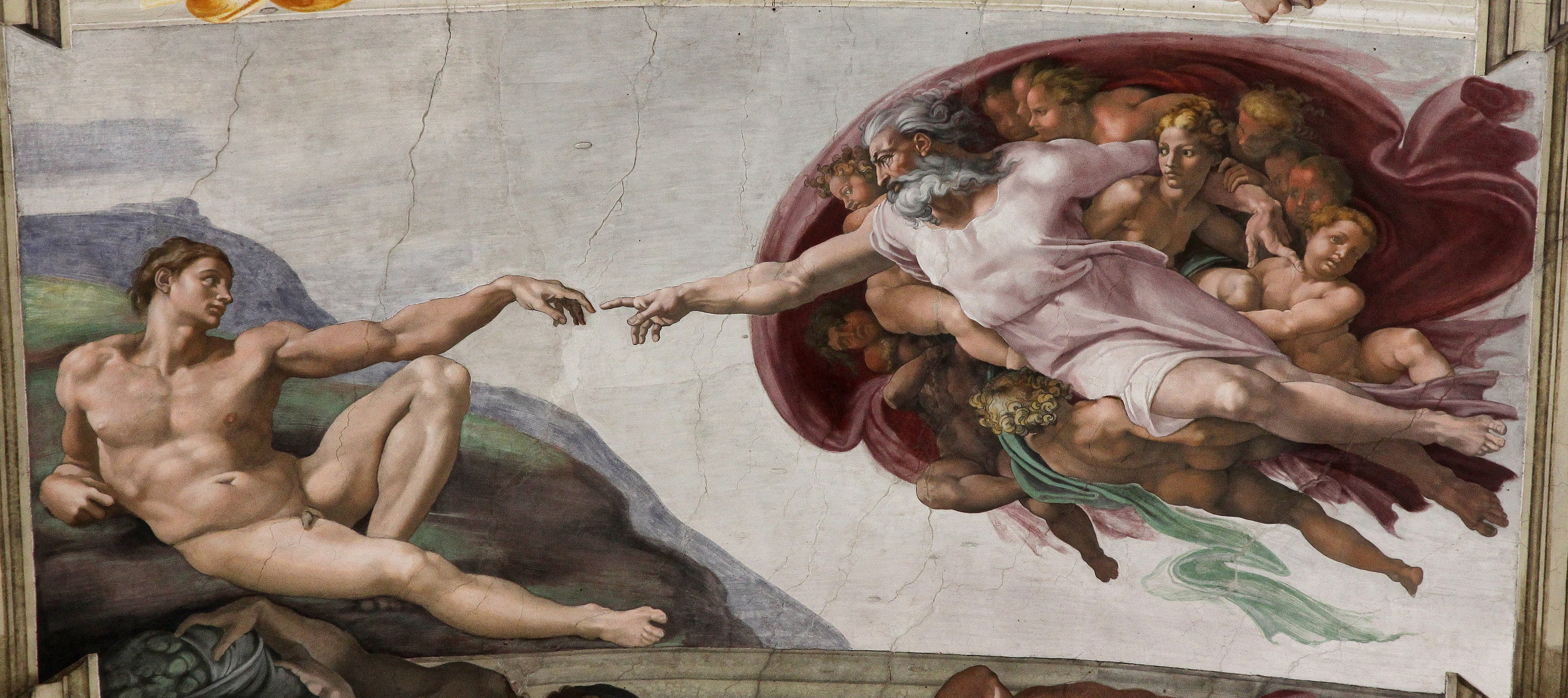
God (right) is depicted as a white-bearded man.

God is depicted as an elderly white-bearded man, wrapped in a swirling cloak while Adam, on the lower left, is completely naked. God's right arm is outstretched to impart the spark of life from his own finger into that of Adam, who is actually already created but inert (see Gen. 2:7), and whose left arm is extended in a pose mirroring God's, a reminder that God said, "Let us make humankind in our image, according to our likeness" (Gen. 1:26). The inspiration for Michelangelo's treatment of the subject may come from a medieval hymn, "Veni Creator Spiritus", which asks the 'finger of the paternal right hand' (digitus paternae dexterae) to give the faithful speech. The two index fingers, however, are separated by a small gap [3/4 inch (1.9 cm)], and some scholars think that it represents the unattainability of divine perfection by man.

Many hypotheses have been formulated regarding the identity and meaning of the twelve figures around God. According to an interpretation that was first proposed by the English art critic Walter Pater (1839–1894) and is now widely accepted, the person protected by God's left arm represents Eve, due to the figure's feminine appearance and gaze towards Adam, and the eleven other figures symbolically represent the souls of Adam and Eve's unborn progeny, the entire human race. This interpretation has been challenged, mainly on the grounds that the Catholic Church regards the teaching of the pre-existence of souls as heretical. Consequently, the figure behind God has also been suggested to be the Virgin Mary, Sophia (the personification of wisdom mentioned in the Book of Wisdom), the personified human soul, or "an angel of feminine build".

== Sources ==
Michelangelo's main source of inspiration for his Adam in his Creation of Adam may have been a cameo showing a nude Augustus Caesar riding sidesaddle on a Capricorn. This cameo is now at Alnwick Castle in Northumberland, England. The cameo used to belong to cardinal Domenico Grimani who lived in Rome while Michelangelo painted the ceiling. Evidence suggests that Michelangelo and Grimani were friends. This cameo offers an alternative theory for those scholars who have been dissatisfied with the theory that Michelangelo was mainly inspired by Lorenzo Ghiberti's Adam in his Creation of Adam.

Detail

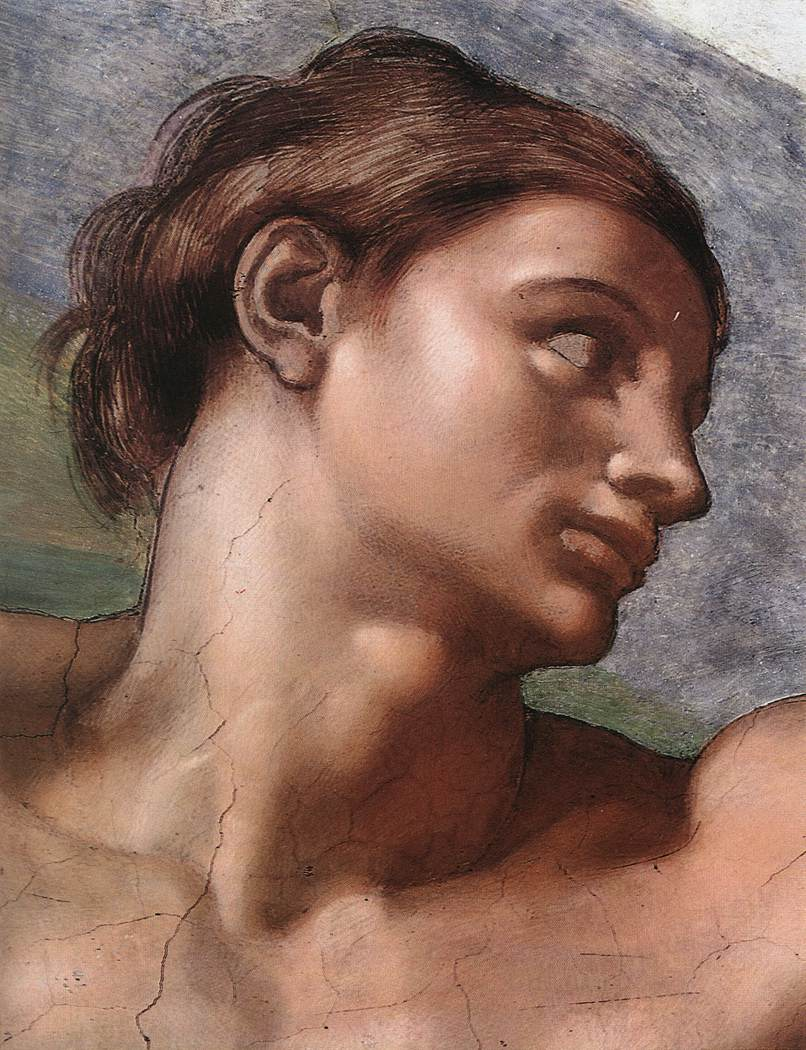
Adam

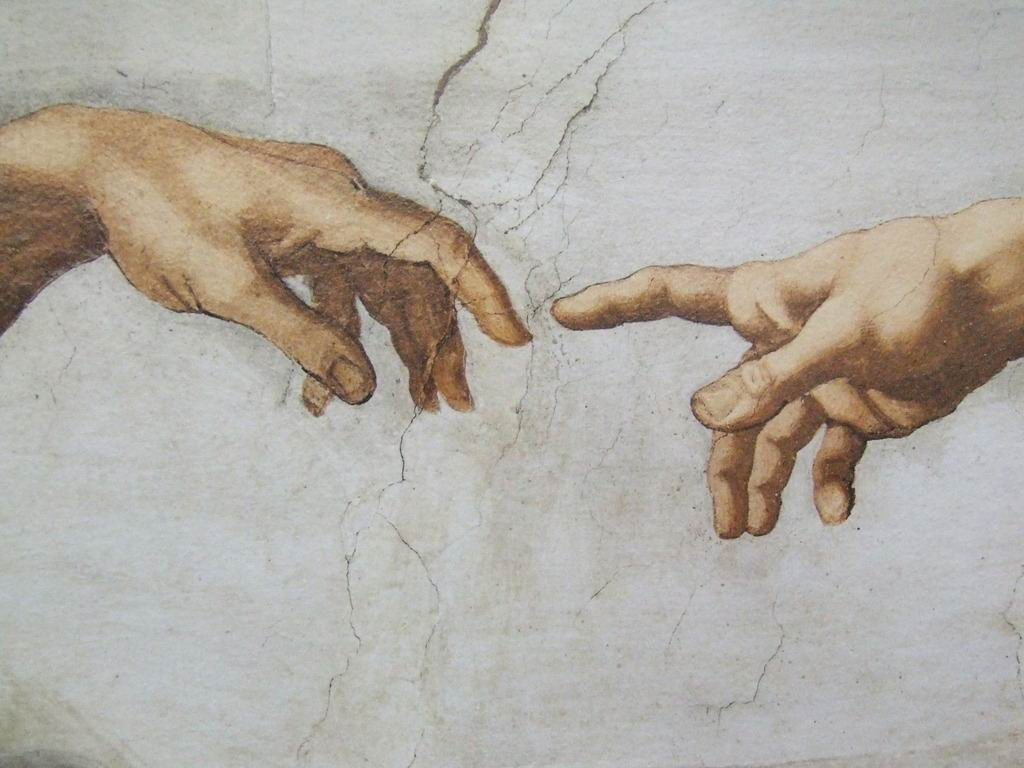
The hands

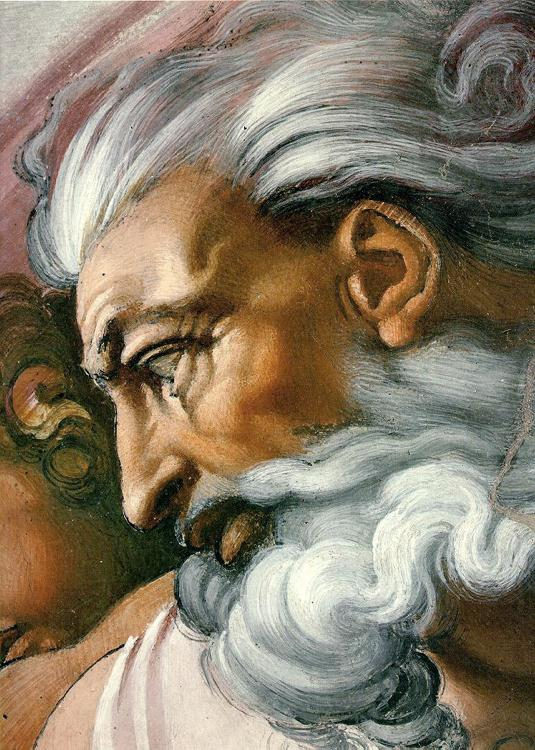
God

== Analysis ==
Several hypotheses have been put forward about the meaning of The Creation of Adam's highly original composition, many of them taking Michelangelo's well-documented expertise in human anatomy as their starting point.

=== Depiction of the human brain ===
In 1990 in Anderson, Indiana, physician Frank Meshberger noted in the Journal of the American Medical Association that the background figures and shapes portrayed behind the figure of God appeared to be an anatomically accurate picture of the human brain. On close examination, borders in the painting correlate with major sulci of the cerebrum in the inner and outer surface of the brain, including a distinctive Sylvian fissure, the brain stem, the frontal lobe, the basilar artery, the pituitary gland and the optic chiasm.

=== Depiction of the birth process ===
Alternatively, it has been observed that the red cloth around God has the shape of a human uterus (one art historian has called it a "uterine mantle") and that the scarf hanging out, coloured green, could be a newly cut umbilical cord. In 2015 a group of Italian researchers published on Mayo Clinic Proceedings an article where the images of the mantle and the postpartum uterus were overlapped. According to Enrico Bruschini (2004), "This is an interesting hypothesis that presents the Creation scene as an idealised representation of the physical birth of man ("The Creation"). It explains the navel that appears on Adam, which is at first perplexing because he was created, not born of a woman."

=== Depiction of Eve's rib ===
Additionally, in 2019 Deivis Campos noted in the Clinical Anatomy Journal that the left side of Adam's torso contains an extra concealed rib. Due to Michelangelo's in-depth knowledge of human anatomy, he insinuates that this rib outline is intentional, and represents the rib of Eve.

Campos suggests that this extra rib inclusion was a way for Michelangelo to represent Adam and Eve being created side by side, which differs from the Catholic tradition that states Eve was created after Adam. There is significant evidence that Michelangelo radically disagreed with many Catholic traditions and had a tumultuous relationship with the commissioner of the ceiling, Pope Julius II. Thus, Campos suggests that the rib inclusion was an intentional way to slight Pope Julius II and the Catholic Church, without having to admit fault, as very few people knew anything about human anatomy at the time and could challenge the piece.

== Critical sketches ==
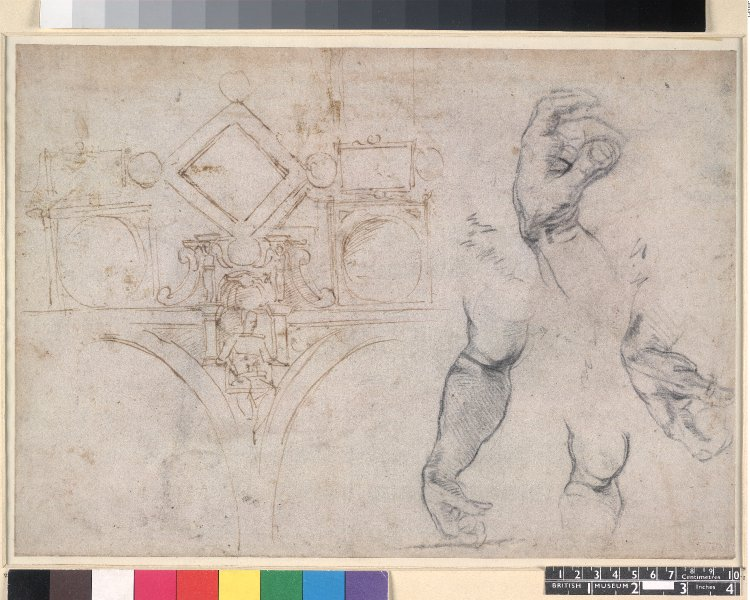
Scheme for the Decoration of the Vault of the Sistine Chapel: Studies of Arms and Hands, British Museum

Michelangelo was a prolific draftsman, as he was trained in a Florentine workshop at a dynamic time in the art scene, when paper had become readily available in sufficient quantity. As follows, sketching was the first step in Michelangelo's artistic process, as it helped him plan his final paintings and sculptural pieces. Thus, Michelangelo's sketches provide a critical link between his creative vision and final compositions. This is especially evident through his sheets "filled with multiple figures and close studies of human anatomy."

=== Preliminary studies ===
Michelangelo completed two sketches in Rome in preparation for the Creation of Adam scene. They are both in the British Museum in London, revealing Michelangelo's in depth planning process for the Sistine Chapel ceiling composition, and his serious attention to perspective and shadowing.

The first is a Scheme for the Decoration of the Vault of the Sistine Chapel: Studies of Arms and Hands. The right side of the page was sketched in 1508 with black chalk, and is a study of Adam's limp hand, before it is ignited with the gift of life from God, in the Creation of Adam scene. Michelangelo sketched this over a previous brown, lead point stylus study of the vaulted Sistine Chapel ceiling. The entire composition is 274 millimeters in height and 386 millimeters in width. The second sketch is titled Studies of a Reclining Male Nude: Adam in the Fresco "The Creation of Man." It was created in 1511 in dark red chalk, over a stylus under drawing. Red chalk was Michelangelo's preferred medium at this period of time, as it could be shaved to a finer point than black chalk. Michelangelo used this fine point to create a scintillating skin surface, that was unique for this particular sketch, and is not seen in his later works. The recto drawing is 193 millimeters in height and 259 millimeters in width.

=== Studies of a Reclining Male Nude ===
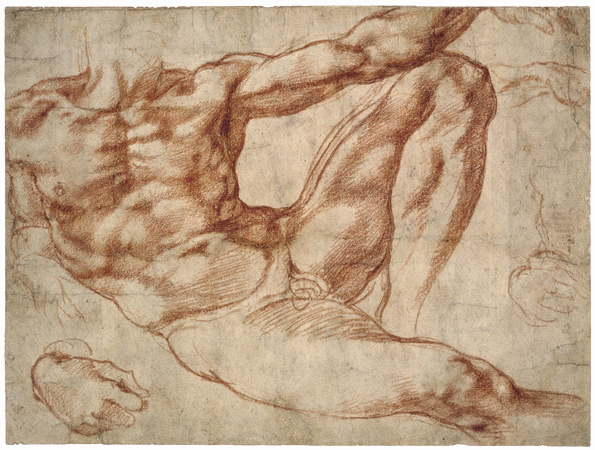
Studies of a Reclining Male Nude, British Museum

In a well known study in red chalk in the British Museum, Adam is resting on earth, propped up by his forearm, with his thighs spread out and his torso slightly twisted to the side. Michelangelo employed a male model to capture this pose and used his red chalk to develop thick contours, in order to establish a definitive form, so every chapel visitor could clearly recognize the muscular body from standing on the floor, 68 feet below the ceiling.

In Michelangelo's final fresco on the ceiling, Adam is physically beautiful, but spiritually still incomplete. The sketch prefaces this story, as it is also incomplete in the sense that the only complete component of the drawing is Adam's twisted torso. Adam's other limbs bleed off of the trimmed page in immature form. However, the work is not "unfinished", as it reached its purpose for Michelangelo, which was to work out the details of the torso in the medium of chalk so he was confident in the composition when he began the actual, permanent fresco panel.

==== Context ====
Michelangelo heavily studied the human body and dissected numerous cadavers in his artistic career, and over time became captivated by the male torso. In his treatises on painting and sculpture, Leon Battista Alberti, defined the male figure as a "geometrical and harmonious sum of its parts". Michelangelo however, felt that the torso was the powerhouse of the male body, and therefore warranted significant attention and mass in his art pieces. Thus, the torso in the Study represents an idealization of the male form, "symbolic of the perfection of God's creation before the fall".

==== Sources ====
Michelangelo's inspiration for the torso in the British Museum sketch is believed to be the Belvedere Torso. The Belvedere Torso is a fragmentary marble statue that is a 1st-century BC Roman copy of an ancient Greek sculpture. Michelangelo historically used ancient, classical statuary as inspiration for the human physique in his great masterpieces. In 2015, the Belvedere Torso was displayed with Michelangelo's sketch in the "Defining Beauty: The Body in Ancient Greek Art" show at the British Museum in London.

Fair as the young men of the Elgin marbles, the Adam of the Sistine Chapel is unlike them in a total absence of that balance and completeness which express so well the sentiment of a self-contained, independent life. In that languid figure there is something rude and satyr-like, something akin to the rugged hillside on which it lies. His whole form is gathered into an expression of mere expectation and reception; he has hardly strength enough to lift his finger to touch the finger of the creator; yet a touch of the finger-tips will suffice.

— Walter Pater, The Renaissance: Studies in Art and Poetry, "The Poetry of Michelangelo"

== See also ==
- The Creation of the Sun, Moon, and Plants
- List of works by Michelangelo
- Sistine Chapel of Football
