= 2005 Ballon d'Or =

European footballing award

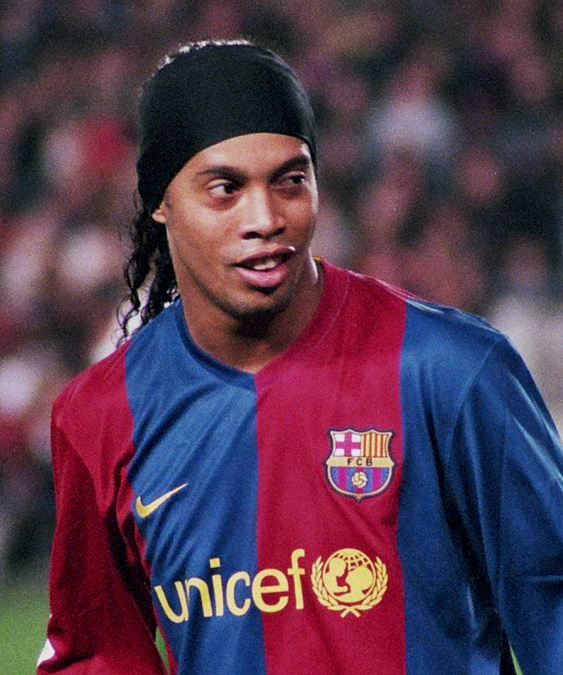
- 2005 Ballon d’Or winner, Ronaldinho
- Date: 28 November 2005
- Location: Paris, France
- Country: France
- Presented by: France Football

Highlights
- Won by: (Brazil) Ronaldinho (1st award)
- Website: ballondor.com

The 2005 Ballon d'Or (lit. '2005 Golden Ball'), given to the best football player in Europe as judged by a panel of sports journalists from UEFA member countries, was delivered to the Brazilian Attacking Midfielder Ronaldinho on 28 November 2005.

Ronaldinho was the third Brazilian to win the award after Rivaldo (1999) and Ronaldo. Paolo Maldini (Italy) was the best ranked defender, at sixth, while Thierry Henry (France) was the top-ranked forward, at fourth place.

== Rankings ==
On 24 October 2005, was announced the shortlist of 50 male players compiled by a group of experts from France Football.

There were 52 voters, from Albania, Andorra, Armenia, Austria, Azerbaijan, Belarus, Belgium, Bosnia and Herzegovina, Bulgaria, Croatia, Cyprus, Czech Republic, Denmark, England, Estonia, Faroe Islands, Finland, France, Georgia, Germany, Greece, Hungary, Iceland, Israel, Italy, Kazakhstan, Latvia, Liechtenstein, Lithuania, Luxembourg, Macedonia, Malta, Moldova, the Netherlands, Northern Ireland, Norway, Poland, Portugal, Republic of Ireland, Romania, Russia, San Marino, Scotland, Serbia and Montenegro, Slovakia, Slovenia, Spain, Sweden, Switzerland, Turkey, Ukraine and Wales. Each picked a first (5pts), second (4pts), third (3pts), fourth (2pts) and fifth choice (1pt).

=== Voted players ===
Rank	Player	Nationality	Club(s)	Total	Votes by place					Votes
Rank	Player	Nationality	Club(s)	Total	1st	2nd	3rd	4th	5th	Votes
1st	Ronaldinho	Brazil	(Spain) Barcelona	225	33	11	4	2	-	50
2nd	Frank Lampard	England	(England) Chelsea	148	6	13	15	10	1	45
3rd	Steven Gerrard	England	(England) Liverpool	142	8	18	7	3	3	39
4th	Thierry Henry	France	(England) Arsenal	41	2	1	6	3	3	15
5th	Andriy Shevchenko	Ukraine	(Italy) Milan	33	-	3	3	4	4	14
6th	Paolo Maldini	Italy	(Italy) Milan	23	1	1	2	1	6	11
7th	Adriano	Brazil	(Italy) Internazionale	22	-	-	4	2	6	12
8th	Zlatan Ibrahimović	Sweden	(Italy) Juventus	21	-	1	2	4	3	10
9th	Kaká	Brazil	(Italy) Milan	19	-	2	1	4	-	7
10th	Samuel Eto'o	Cameroon	(Spain) Barcelona	18	-	1	2	3	2	8
10th	John Terry	England	(England) Chelsea	18	-	1	-	3	8	12
12th	Juninho	Brazil	(France) Lyon	15	-	-	1	3	6	10
13th	Claude Makélélé	France	(England) Chelsea	8	1	-	1	-	-	2
14th	Juan Román Riquelme	Argentina	(Spain) Villarreal	7	-	-	1	2	-	3
14th	Petr Čech	Czech Republic	(England) Chelsea	7	-	-	1	1	2	4
14th	Didier Drogba	Ivory Coast	(England) Chelsea	7	-	-	1	1	2	4
14th	Michael Ballack	Germany	(Germany) Bayern Munich	7	-	-	-	3	1	4
18th	Zinedine Zidane	France	(Spain) Real Madrid	5	1	-	-	-	-	1
19th	Gianluigi Buffon	Italy	(Italy) Juventus	4	-	-	-	1	2	3
20th	Jamie Carragher	England	(England) Liverpool	3	-	-	1	-	-	1
20th	Cristiano Ronaldo	Portugal	(England) Manchester United	3	-	-	-	1	1	2
22nd	Michael Essien	Ghana	(France) Lyon (England) Chelsea	2	-	-	-	1	-	1
23rd	Luis García	Spain	(England) Liverpool	1	-	-	-	-	1	1
23rd	Pavel Nedvěd	Czech Republic	(Italy) Juventus	1	-	-	-	-	1	1

=== Non-voted players ===
The following 26 players were originally in contention for the 2005 Ballon d’Or, but did not receive any votes:

Player	Nationality	Club(s)
David Beckham	England	(Spain) Real Madrid
Mauro Camoranesi	Italy	(Italy) Juventus
Fabio Cannavaro	Italy	(Italy) Juventus
Grégory Coupet	France	(France) Lyon
Cris	Brazil	(France) Lyon
Deco	Portugal	(Spain) Barcelona
Dida	Brazil	(Italy) Milan
Emerson	Brazil	(Italy) Juventus
Luís Figo	Portugal	(Spain) Real Madrid (Italy) Internazionale
Diego Forlán	Uruguay	(Spain) Villarreal
Roy Makaay	Netherlands	(Germany) Bayern Munich
Michael Owen	England	(Spain) Real Madrid (England) Newcastle United
Park Ji-sung	South Korea	(Netherlands) PSV Eindhoven (England) Manchester United
Andrea Pirlo	Italy	(Italy) Milan
Raúl	Spain	(Spain) Real Madrid
Arjen Robben	Netherlands	(England) Chelsea
Roberto Carlos	Brazil	(Spain) Real Madrid
Robinho	Brazil	(Spain) Real Madrid
Ronaldo	Brazil	(Spain) Real Madrid
Wayne Rooney	England	(England) Manchester United
Lilian Thuram	France	(Italy) Juventus
David Trezeguet	France	(Italy) Juventus
Mark van Bommel	Netherlands	(Netherlands) PSV Eindhoven (Spain) Barcelona
Ruud van Nistelrooy	Netherlands	(England) Manchester United
Patrick Vieira	France	(England) Arsenal (Italy) Juventus
Xavi	Spain	(Spain) Barcelona
