= Juan Román Riquelme =

Argentine professional footballer (born 1978)

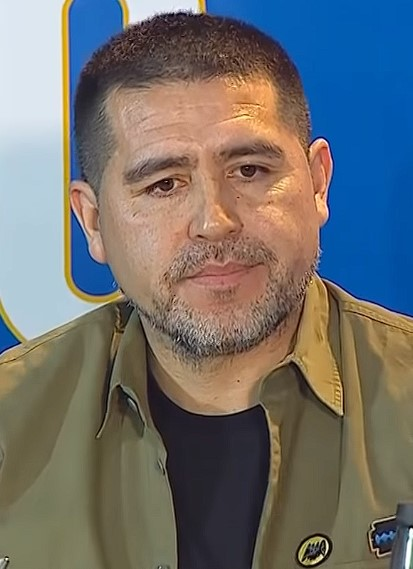
- Riquelme in 2019

Personal information
- Full name: Juan Román Riquelme
- Date of birth: 24 June 1978 (age 48)
- Place of birth: San Fernando, Buenos Aires,Argentina
- Height: 1.82 m (5 ft 11 1/2 in)
- Position: Attacking midfielder

Team information
- Current team: Boca Juniors (president)

Youth career
- 1992–1996: Argentinos Juniors

Senior career*
Years	Team	Apps	(Gls)
1996–2002	Boca Juniors	151	(38)
2002–2005	Barcelona	30	(3)
2003–2005	→ Villarreal (loan)	68	(23)
2005–2007	Villarreal	38	(13)
2007	→ Boca Juniors (loan)	15	(2)
2007–2014	Boca Juniors	126	(24)
2014–2015	Argentinos Juniors	15	(3)
Total		443	(106)

International career
1997–1998	Argentina U20	21	(7)
2000	Argentina U23	3	(1)
2008	Argentina Olympic (O.P.)	6	(1)
1997–2008	Argentina	51	(17)
Medal record
Men's football
Representing Argentina
Summer Olympics
Gold medal – first place	2008 Beijing	Team
FIFA U-20 World Cup
Winner	1997 Malaysia
South American Youth Football Championship
Winner	1997 Chile
Copa América
Runner-up	2007 Venezuela
FIFA Confederations Cup
Runner-up	2005 Germany
- * Club domestic league appearances and goals

Juan Román Riquelme (Spanish pronunciation: [ˈxwan roˈman riˈkelme]; born 24 June 1978) is an Argentine former professional footballer and current president of Boca Juniors. Known for his elegant playing style, passing, vision, creativity, free-kick technique, and ball retention, he is widely considered one of the greatest playmakers of all time. He is a major symbol of the "enganche" figure, a classic attacking midfield role prominent in Argentine football.

In 1996, Riquelme made his professional debut at age 18 at Boca Juniors. Under Carlos Bianchi's coaching, Riquelme led Boca Juniors through their most successful era, winning three Argentine Primera División titles, two back-to-back Copa Libertadores titles, and the 2000 Intercontinental Cup, beating Real Madrid in Tokyo. After five seasons, he signed for Barcelona in 2002, where he had a short spell due to his strained relationship with then-manager Louis van Gaal. He was loaned to fellow La Liga club Villarreal, where Riquelme would help the club achieve a third-place league finish in the 2004–05 La Liga and reach the semi-finals of the Champions League for the first time in the club's history in the 2005–06 campaign. He returned to Boca in 2007, winning the 2007 Copa Libertadores as the tournament's MVP and top scorer, in addition to two Primera División titles, one Copa Argentina, and one Recopa Sudamericana. After losing the 2012 Copa Libertadores final, Riquelme left Boca Juniors, only to return six months later following Bianchi's return as manager. He retired in 2015 at Argentinos Juniors, his former youth club, after helping them return to the Primera División in the 2014 season.

With the Argentina national team, Riquelme achieved success at youth level, winning the 1997 South American U-20 Championship and the 1997 FIFA World Youth Championship in Malaysia. He would earn his first call-up to the senior team in 1997, and went on to appear 57 times between 1997 and 2008, scoring 17 goals and representing Argentina at the 2006 FIFA World Cup in Germany. Riquelme also represented his nation in the Olympics, captaining the side to gold at the 2008 Summer Olympics alongside Lionel Messi.

Riquelme was distinguished as Argentina's footballer of the year four times and named South American Footballer of the Year in 2001, and was also included in the South American Team of the Year six times. He was among the nominees for the FIFA World Player of the Year award in 2006 and 2007, and the Ballon d'Or in 2005 and 2007.

== Club career ==
=== Early years ===
Riquelme was born as the eldest of eleven children in a poor family, one day before Argentina won the 1978 World Cup. He began playing football in the localities of San Fernando, playing for different local clubs, before gaining the opportunity to trial with the junior teams of Argentinos Juniors. After trialling, he was signed by the club where he began playing as a central midfielder. Boca Juniors and River Plate spotted him when he was a youth player for Argentinos Juniors. In 1996, however, Riquelme was transferred from Argentinos Juniors U-20 to Boca Juniors U-20 for a fee of US$800,000, during an operation insisted by trainer Carlos Salvador Bilardo which led to the then president of Boca Juniors, Mauricio Macri, establishing various purchases of Argentinos Juniors youth players.

=== Boca Juniors ===
On 10 November 1996, aged 18, Riquelme made his Primera División debut in a 2–0 win against Unión de Santa Fe. Two weeks later, he scored his first senior goal in a 6–0 triumph over Huracán. After making his debut, Riquelme began a long journey to break a streak of no championships for the team since winning the Apertura 1992. In the 1996–97 season, Bilardo would be fired and replaced by Héctor "Bambino" Veira, but Boca continued with mediocre results, finishing mid table in both Apertura and Clausura tournaments, with Riquelme himself scoring 4 goals and making 22 appearances in the campaign. After almost obtaining the championship in the 1997–98 season, by July 1998 Veira would be replaced by coach Carlos Bianchi, who would fully trust Riquelme to command the team.

Forming a successful trio in attack with winger Guillermo Barros Schelotto and center forward Martín Palermo, Boca would once again win a title after six years, by becoming the 1998 Apertura champions undefeated. This would also earn the team a qualification for the 2000 edition of the Copa Libertadores, where Boca would make its return after six years. The season would be highly successful, with the team winning the 1999 Clausura and reaching a historic 40-game undefeated mark. Riquelme ended the 1998-99 campaign with 47 games played and 10 goals scored, also entering the South American Team of the Year for the first time.

In the 1999–2000 season, Boca won the Copa Libertadores, Riquelme's first international title with the club. Riquelme had an excellent performance during the competition; in the round of 16 second leg against El Nacional, he scored and had three assists as Boca won 5–3. Another stellar performance he had was in the quarterfinals second leg against rivals River Plate, where he scored a goal, assisted in another, and made a historic play where he nutmegged River defender Mario Yepes as Boca won 3–0. Boca's successes would continue in the 2000–01 season, winning the Apertura 2000. However, the highest point would be the final of the Intercontinental Cup against Real Madrid, who at that time was in the process of forming Los Galácticos, with the signing of the Ballon d'Or winner Luis Figo. Against all odds, Boca ended up winning the match, and Riquelme would be one of the stars assisting for Martín Palermo's second goal with a 30-meter ball. During 2001, Boca would not obtain any local title, but would win again in the Copa Libertadores, defeating Mexican Cruz Azul in the finals again through penalties. This time Román would have an outstanding performance against Palmeiras in the semifinal series, where the Argentine midfielder managed to give an assist in the first leg and score a goal in the second leg. Riquelme would be chosen the MVP of the tournament, and would also win the South American Footballer of the Year award for the first time in his career. As the champions of Copa Libertadores his side faced 2001 UEFA Champions League winners Bayern Munich in the Intercontinental Cup final which ended in a 0–1 defeat for his club.

The closing of the 2001–02 season, Riquelme's last in Boca, would not be as successful as the previous ones, the main cause being the departure of Carlos Bianchi in the summer of 2001, due to his differences with the president of the club Mauricio Macri. Riquelme would also have his differences with him due to the poor pay of his contract, to which Riquelme would demonstrate in a match against River Plate for the 2001 Clausura where he celebrated in front of the president's box, putting his hands to his ear in protest.

=== Barcelona ===
In July 2002, after seven successful seasons with Boca Juniors which brought him and the club six major titles, including the Intercontinental Cup and the Copa Libertadores in 2000, Riquelme transferred to Barcelona in Spain for a reported €11 million transfer fee. Shortly before his departure, his brother, Cristian, was kidnapped; Riquelme negotiated for his brother's release and eventually paid the ransom, later stating this was one of the reasons why he chose to leave Boca.

Barça manager Louis van Gaal described Riquelme as a "political signing" and treated him with indifference. When the Dutchman did play him, he did so rarely, deploying him as a winger. Thus, the player was unable to find his form during a period of largely substitute appearances, losing his place in the first team. He played mainly – as a starter – in the Copa del Rey, and netted the game's only goal in a rare UEFA Champions League starting opportunity, at Club Brugge in the group stage. Barcelona's season would be critical in every way, with Van Gaal being fired mid-season. This did not change the situation for the better, and Riquelme would continue to appear mainly as a substitute.

=== Villarreal (2003–06) ===
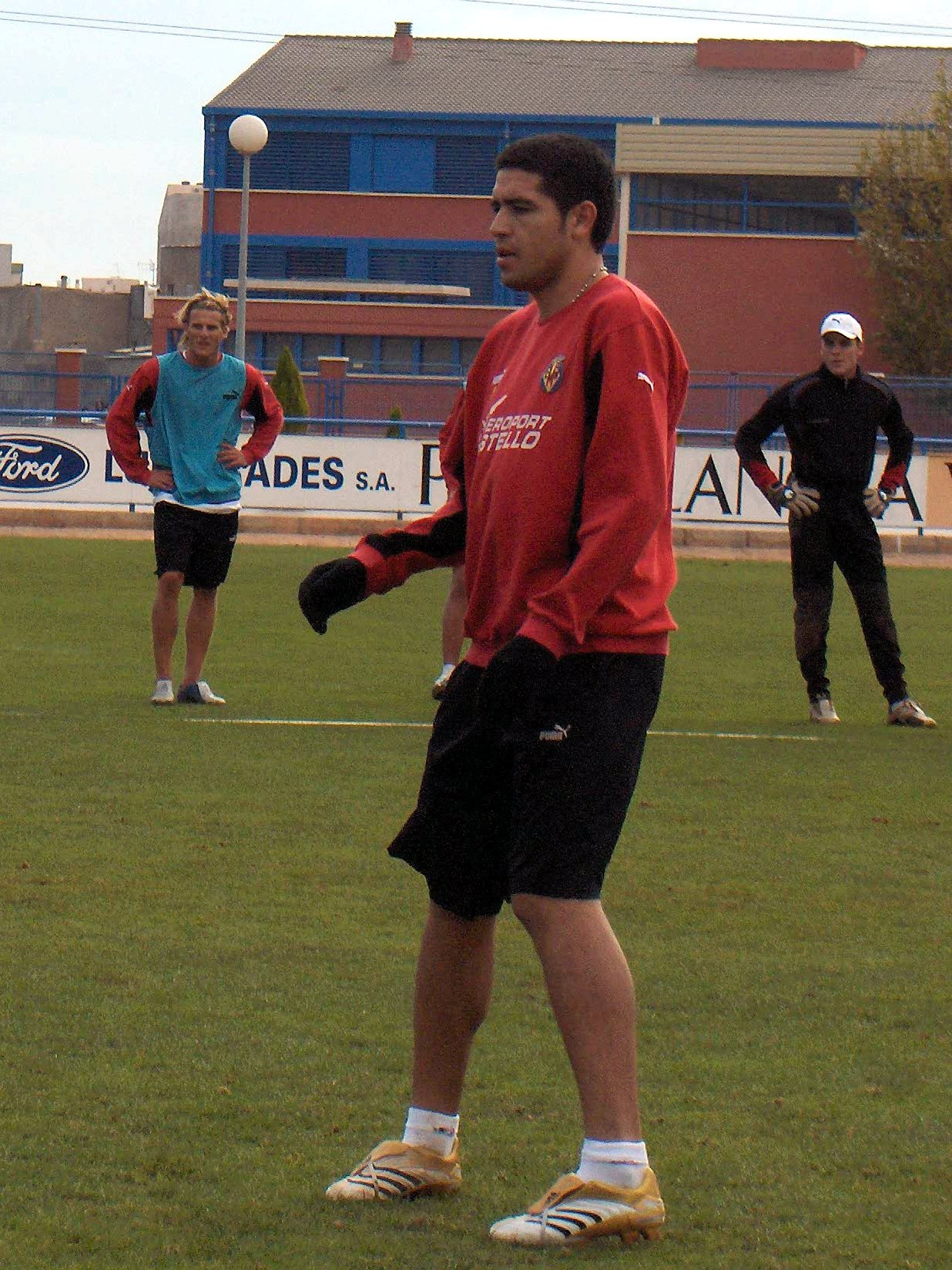
Riquelme, with Diego Forlán and Sebastián Viera, during a training session with Villarreal in 2005

When Barcelona signed Ronaldinho, the club exceeded the maximum foreign players that Spanish teams were allowed, prompting Riquelme's two-year loan move to Villarreal. There, he played alongside three compatriots: Rodolfo Arruabarrena, Gonzalo Rodríguez and Juan Pablo Sorín.

At the end of the 2004–05 season, Spanish sports newspaper Marca awarded Riquelme with the title of Most Artistic Player, also earning himself a nomination for the 2005 FIFA World Player of the Year award after scoring a career-best 15 goals in 35 games. The Valencian club finished the season in its best-ever position in third place, and in an effort to keep hold of him, bought up 75% of his rights from Barcelona for up to €8 million, depending on Villarreal performance in the next two seasons. Villarreal also gave Riquelme a four-year contract extension, with the caveat that 25% of any subsequent transfer fee would be provided to Barça should Villarreal sell him.

A peculiar contract situation arose when, on 7 December 2005, Villarreal beat French club Lille 1–0 to win its Champions League group, knocking out English giants Manchester United and advancing to the knockout stages in the club's debut season in the main continental competition. Because of a clause in the transfer contract with Barcelona, Villarreal had to pay €1 million to the Catalan club. Additionally, the contract included two other "€1 million clauses": One if Villarreal finished in one of the top four league positions in 2005–06, and an identical clause for the following season.

On 25 April 2006, as Villarreal reached the last-four in the Champions League, in the second leg against Arsenal, Jens Lehmann saved a Riquelme penalty that would have taken the match to extra time. The game ended 0–0 at El Madrigal.

Riquelme scored his first goal of the 2006–07 season in a 3–2 home victory against Real Zaragoza on 24 September 2006. He scored a penalty in the 79th minute to give Villarreal their third goal of the match. Riquelme went on to make just 13 league appearances during the first half of the 2006–07 La Liga and played no part in the 2006–07 Copa del Rey.

=== Return to Boca Juniors ===
==== 2007 loan ====
Everyone feels the game in their own different way. People say I never smile when I play but I've never seen [Zinedine] Zidane laugh, whether he's winning or losing, and he’s the greatest there's been for the last ten years.

— Riquelme in 2006, on his character on the pitch.

Following a tense situation between players, the Villarreal board of directors and manager Manuel Pellegrini, Riquelme accepted a five-month loan back to Boca Juniors from February 2007 until 30 June 2007. He joined Boca for the 2007 Torneo Clausura of the 2007–08 Argentine Primera División season, debuting during the 2007 Torneo Clausura in a 1–1 home draw against Rosario Central on 17 February 2007. He scored his first goal for Boca – in his newest stint – in a 1–1 home draw against Independiente on 9 March 2007. He scored in the 54th minute to level the scores. His first goal of the 2007 Copa Libertadores came in Boca's third group-stage match against Mexico's Toluca on 22 March 2007. Riquelme scored in the 23rd minute, Boca's second goal of the match in an eventual 3–0 home victory. Boca finished in second position of their respective group with ten points, advancing to the knockout stages of the competition.

During the knockout stages of the competition, Boca faced Vélez Sarsfield in the round of 16 fixtures. During the first leg on 2 May 2007, Riquelme scored in the first minute as Boca claimed a 3–0 home victory. Having progressed to the quarter-finals, Boca Juniors faced Paraguayan side Club Libertad. During the second-leg of the quarter-finals, played on 24 May 2007, Riquelme scored Boca's first goal in the 61st minute of the match as they claimed a 2–0 away victory and a 3–1 aggregate result, ensuring progression to the semi-finals. During Boca's second-leg semi-final fixture against Colombia's Cúcuta Deportivo on 7 June 2007, Riquelme scored a 44th-minute free kick, scoring Boca's first goal of their 3–0 home victory. After winning 4–3 on aggregate, Boca advanced to the 2007 Copa Libertadores Final, where they would face Brazilian side Grêmio in June 2007.

During the first leg on 13 June, Riquelme, via a free-kick, played striker Martín Palermo who passed the ball across the face of goal for Rodrigo Palacio to score in the 18th minute. During the second half, Riquelme scored the 2–0 goal in the 73rd minute through a free-kick, with Boca eventually winning 3–0 at home. In the second leg, played away on 20 June, Riquelme scored a second-half double to give Boca Juniors a 2–0 victory and their sixth Copa Libertadores title. Boca Juniors therefore qualified for the 2007 FIFA Club World Cup, and Riquelme was awarded as the competition's Most Valuable Player.

==== 2007–08 season ====
In August 2007, it was reported that Boca had given up hope of re-signing Riquelme. A few days later, however, the situation changed, with Boca director Juan Carlos Crespi expressing confidence in the player's return "within 10 days". The negotiations stalled when Villarreal's counteroffered to sell Riquelme only in exchange for €4 million, Rodrigo Palacio and half the rights to either Mauro Boselli or Jonathan Maidana, terms which were rejected by Boca. On 30 August 2007, however, it was announced Riquelme had been signed by Atlético Madrid for a fee of €8 million, though the deal fell through at the last minute, leaving Riquelme a Villarreal player. He was given the number 16 shirt for the 2007–08 season. Then, on 26 November 2007, Riquelme reached an agreement with Villarreal to allow his re-joining Boca Juniors when the next transfer window re-opened, in January 2008.

Boca opted to pay Villarreal US$15 million to purchase Riquelme, while Villarreal would pay Riquelme's salary on behalf of Boca Juniors for remainder of the 2007–08 playing season, which was approximately €3 million. The deal was the most expensive fee paid to an Argentine for its respective player in history. Riquelme subsequently signed a contract lasting from the end of 2007 to 2010. He was unable to participate in the 2007 FIFA Club World Cup as he was not registered by FIFA in time to be able to compete at the tournament.

During the entire 2007–08 Argentine Primera División season, Riquelme would only go on to make ten league appearances and score one league goal. His first match of 2007–08 came in a 1–1 draw against Rosario Central during the 2008 Torneo Clausura. On 4 May 2008, he assisted Sebastián Battaglia in scoring Boca's only goal in their 1–0 home victory in the Superclásico with River Plate. Riquelme had taken a corner which was played to Battaglia, who headed the ball into the net in the 14th minute. During Boca's last 2008 Copa Libertadores group-stage fixture against Maracaibo on 22 April 2008, Riquelme assisted defender Gabriel Paletta in scoring Boca's first goal when his free-kick was played towards Paletta, who headed the ball into the net in the tenth minute. Riquelme then scored Boca's third goal in the 74th minute with a close-ranged chip as Boca claimed a 3–0 home victory and finished in second position of their respective group, qualifying for the knockout stages of the competition.

During the first-leg of the round of 16 stage on 30 April 2008, Riquelme side footed the ball into the net in the sixth minute after receiving a pass from Álvaro González. Boca went on to win the match 2–1 and eventually claimed a 4–2 aggregate win. The club then faced Fluminense in the semi-final stages. In the first leg on 28 May 2008, Riquelme scored in the 12th minute of the match to give Boca a 1–0 lead after receiving a pass from Rodrigo Palacio, who played the ball across goal for Riquelme to convert. In the 65th minute, Riquelme scored from a free-kick which gave Boca a 2–1 lead before Fluminense again equalized. The second leg saw Fluminense defeat Boca Juniors 3–1, eliminating the Argentine side 5–3 on aggregate. Riquelme had scored four goals in the competition.

==== 2008–09 season ====
In October 2008, Boca Juniors centre-back Julio César Cáceres had a very public conflict with his teammate Riquelme, when during an interview on a Paraguayan radio station in Asunción, during his training with his national team, Cáceres questioned Riquelme's motivation. He claimed: "In some matches, he is apparently running and in others he is passive. He seems to be mentally saturated. He seems to have more motivation when he plays for his country." Riquelme responded by saying, in a telephone interview on the Fox Sports cable channel: "He doesn't know what I feel for the club. I take part in pre-match concentration just like the other players and I didn't have a holiday because I chose to play in the Olympics. When we won the gold, I ran to the airport so I could play in the (Recopa Sudamericana 2008) final." He added: "These things should be kept in the dressing-room, he's broken all the codes of football." After Boca won the Superclásico derby match over Buenos Aires rivals River Plate on 21 October 2008, Cáceres said that the conflict "has been left behind", adding that the relationship between the two players had improved.

During the second leg of the 2008 Recopa Sudamericana, Riquelme scored a 91st-minute free-kick to equalize the scores for Boca Juniors at 2–2 against Arsenal de Sarandí on 27 August 2008. Boca Juniors won the tie 5–3 on aggregate.

==== 2009–10 season ====
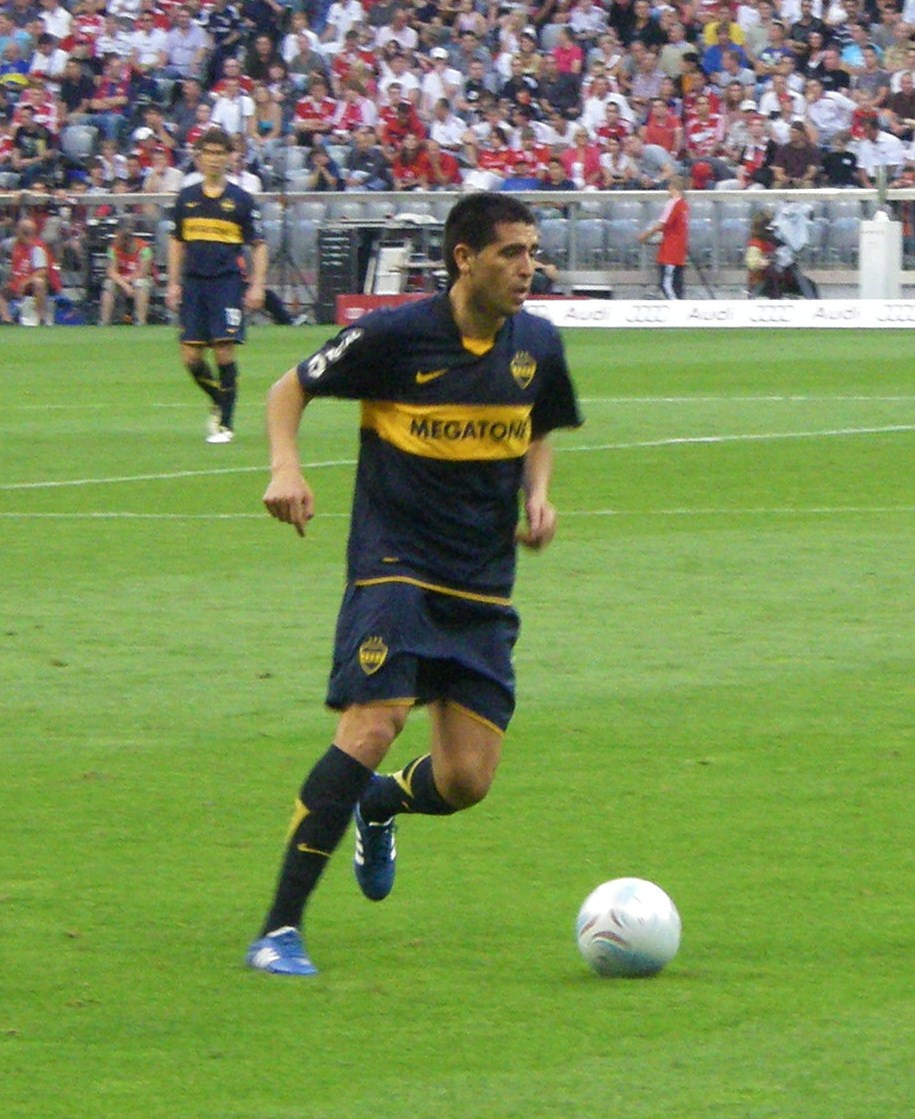
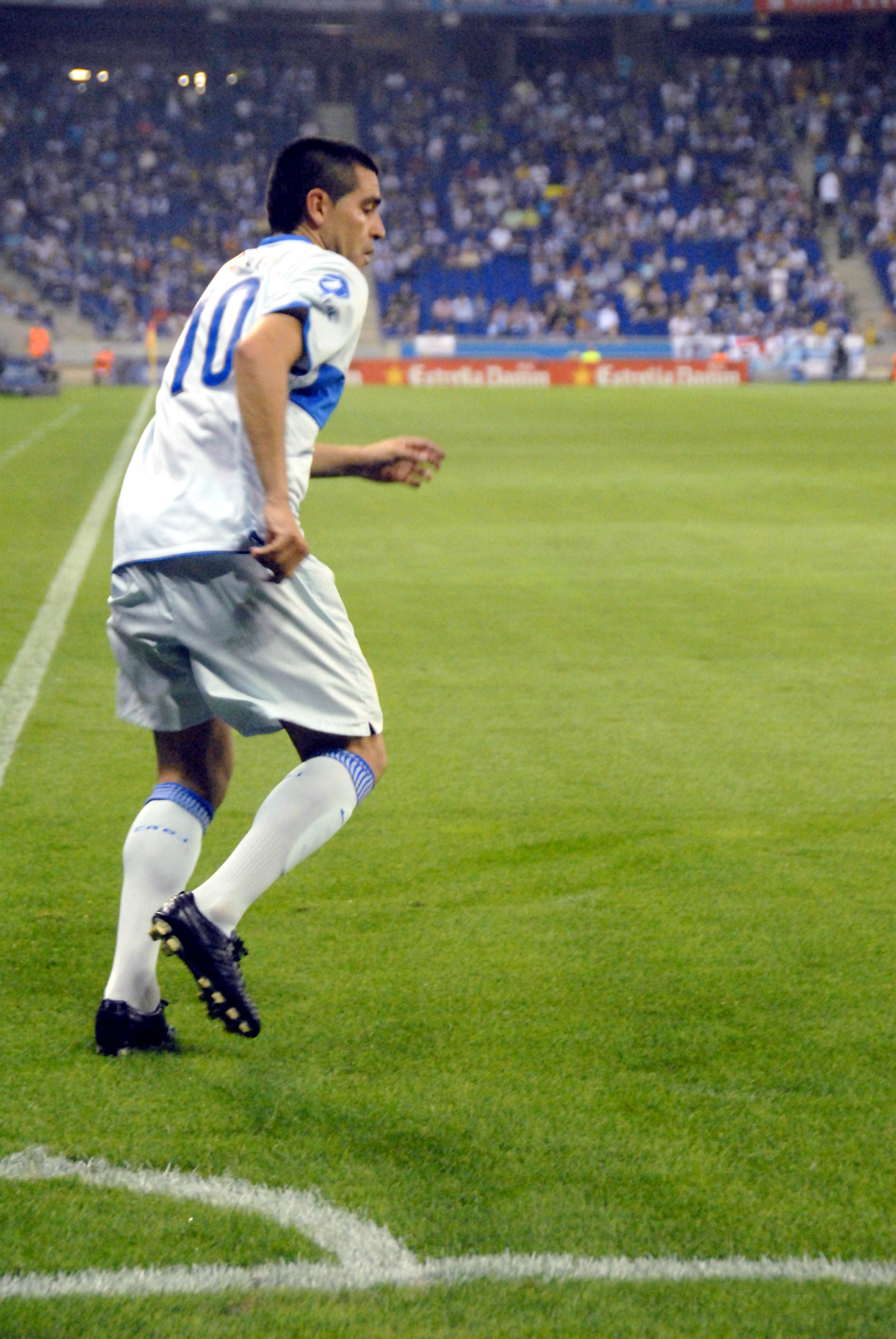
Two moments of Riquelme during his second tenure on Boca Juniors, (left): in the 2009 Audi Cup; (right): in a friendly v RCD Espanyol in 2011

Boca and Riquelme had a slow first half of the season, ending the Apertura 2009 tournament in 11th place. Riquelme scored once in a victory against Vélez Sarsfield before suffering a Plantar fasciitis injury in October that kept him out for the rest of the season.

On 12 April 2010, Riquelme scored Boca's third goal in the 47th minute of their 4–0 home victory against Arsenal de Sarandí. Boca had a poor season and finished 16th in the table. Shortly after the conclusion of the season, Riquelme underwent surgery on his left knee.

==== 2010-11 season ====
Riquelme extended his contract in August 2010, despite still being injured. Riquelme returned from injury on 6 November 2010, starting in a 2–0 defeat against Argentinos. After playing the Superclasico on 16 November, he suffered another foot problem and missed the last 5 matches of the season.

Riquelme was more productive in the first half of 2011, making 11 appearances and scoring 4 goals as Boca improved on the previous season to a 7th-place finish. His most notable of those 4 came in a 1–0 victory against Colon on 27 March, where he scored a free kick from a tight angle.

==== 2011–12 season ====
His first goal of the 2011–12 season came in a 4–0 home victory against Unión de Santa Fé on 15 August; his was Boca's third goal, coming in the 83rd minute. Boca finished in first place of the 2011 Torneo Clausura with 43 points, going undefeated in 19 league games. They had claimed the title for the first time in four years, securing qualification to the 2012 Copa Libertadores.

On 2 February 2012, Riquelme's assisted Facundo Roncaglia in a 2011–12 Copa Argentina match against Deportivo Santamarina. With the scores at 1–1 after 90 minutes, the match was decided via penalty shoot-out, which Boca won 4–3. Riquelme scored his first goal of the 2012 Torneo Clausura in a 2–0 home victory against Newell's Old Boys on 26 February; it was Boca's second goal, coming in the 80th minute.

On 11 March, Riquelme scored Boca's second goal in their 5–4 home defeat against Independiente. Another two weeks later, Riquelme scored Boca's second goal in their 2–2 home draw against Lanús. In Boca's last Copa Libertadores group-stage match, against Zamora on 18 April, Riquelme scored Boca's second goal in the 75th minute of their 2–0 home victory. The win earned them a second-place finish in their respective group with 13 points, advancing the side to the knockout stages of the competition.

Here, Boca were drawn against Chilean club Unión Española at the round of 16 stage. During the first leg on 2 May, Riquelme scored Boca's first goal of the match in the 25th minute, which gave them a 1–0 lead. In the 90th minute of the match, Riquelme assisted Boca in scoring their second goal of the match when he passed the ball towards the left hand side of the goal into the path of Pablo Mouche, who crossed the ball across the face of goal for Santiago Silva to head home the winner in the eventual 2–1 home victory. During the second leg, on 9 May, Riquelme assisted Juan Insaurralde for Boca's first goal of the match in the 26th minute. During the second half, Riquelme had his second assist of the match after setting up Pablo Mouche for Boca's second goal in the 50th minute. Riquelme then scored Boca's third goal in the 68th minute as Boca won 3–2.

I'm quitting now. I love this club, I love the fans and I'll always be grateful because I am, and will always be, a Boca fan. I feel empty now though.

— Riquelme in 2012, on leaving Boca.

During the quarter-final stages of the Copa Libertadores, Boca were drawn against Fluminense. During the first leg in Buenos Aires on 17 May, Riquelme assisted Boca in scoring the only goal of the match when he played a ball through to Darío Cvitanich, who set up Pablo Mouche to score in the 51st minute of the 1–0 victory. Boca drew 1–1 in the second leg on 23 May, earning a 2–1 aggregate score and a spot in the semi-finals. On 3 June 2012, Boca faced Primera B Nacional second division club Deportivo Merlo in the semi-finals of the Copa Argentina. In the 57th minute of the match, Riquelme, initially taking a free-kick in front of goal, played a quick one-two with a teammate and curled the ball into the left side of the net, giving them a 1–0 lead. Boca held on to the 1–0 lead until the 89th minute when Deportivo Merlo equalized. The match was eventually decided via penalty shoot-out which Boca won 5–4.

After Boca Juniors had eliminated Chilean club Universidad de Chile in the semi-finals of the Copa Libertadores, Boca faced Corinthians in the two-legged final. Riquelme participated in both matches of the 3–1 aggregate defeat, immediately announcing his retirement from the club after the 2–0 second-leg away defeat in São Paulo on 4 July. Riquelme, who at the time was 34 years old, stated that he would be leaving the club as a result of not have enough energy left to continue. Riquelme admitted he would quit Boca as he had nothing more left to give because he was exhausted, and also signalled that he needed a break from football. Without the presence of Riquelme, Boca went on to win the 2011–12 Copa Argentina when they defeated Racing Club in a 2–1 victory on 8 August.

==== 2012–13 transfer speculation ====
On 18 October 2012, it was reported that Riquelme's agent, Daniel Bolotnicoff, had denied reports that any Australian A-League club had contacted him to show an interest in signing Riquelme, as he had been linked with Melbourne Heart and Western Sydney Wanderers. On 5 January 2013, it was reported that Riquelme nearly joined Major League Soccer (MLS) side Chivas USA when he was to follow former coach Carlos Bianchi in a trip to the United States, as the latter was going to be head coach of the MLS club. Bianchi was then announced as Boca's first-team coach ten days later, which led to Riquelme's reiteration that he would not re-join Boca Juniors as a player.

In January 2013, after much speculation that Riquelme was headed to join Palmeiras, it was announced by newly appointed club president Paulo Nobre that Palmeiras had to refrain from signing Riquelme due to financial terms and Riquelme's asking salary.

On 26 January 2013, Riquelme confessed that he did not miss playing football and that his last options would be to play for Argentinos Juniors or Tigre. On 30 January 2013, it was officially reported that Argentinos Juniors president Luis Seguira had announced that the club would make an offer for Riquelme. On 31 January 2013, it was then reported that Riquelme had visited Tigre's intendent, Sergio Massa, in order to discuss the possibility of his arrival at the club. On 3 February 2013, it was reported that, after various negotiations, Riquelme had accepted the offer to play for Tigre, and that the discussion and confirmation of his contract was the only thing which remained to be done until his official signing with the club.

On 4 February 2013, it was reported that Riquelme had stated that he was prepared to return to Boca Juniors, and that he had contacted Boca coach Carlos Bianchi that he would be available to return.

==== 2013–14 season ====
It was confirmed on 8 February 2013 that Riquelme would return to Boca Juniors. He played a key role in the second leg against Corinthians in the Copa Libertadores on 15 May, scoring a goal that helped Boca advance 2–1 on aggregate and knock out the reigning FIFA Club World Cup champions. In the next round, after both legs against Newell's finished 0–0, the tie was decided by a penalty shootout, in which Riquelme missed his spot kick and Boca were ultimately eliminated.

On 30 March 2014, Riquelme scored a free kick in the Superclásico, but could not stop his team from losing 2–1 against River Plate. On 21 April, in the last minute of the match against Tigre, he scored the winning goal with a long range strike.

=== Argentinos Juniors ===
On 17 July 2014, it was confirmed that Riquelme would sign with Argentinos Juniors. He scored his first goal with his new club in his first game against Boca Unidos.

=== Retirement ===
On 23 January 2015, it was reported that Riquelme would travel to Asunción on Saturday 24 January to close the contract offer from Primera División Paraguaya club Cerro Porteño, which would be worth US$110,000 per month, a salary which Riquelme had asked to receive. It was later confirmed that Riquelme's salary would make his contract the most expensive in the country. On 25 January 2015, however, Riquelme officially announced his retirement from football via ESPN and ultimately gave thanks to Cerro Porteño. Riquelme's farewell took place eight years later, on June 25 in Buenos Aires, as Boca Juniors faced the Argentina national team at the Bombonera stadium. Lionel Messi captained the Argentina XI, joined by Angel Di Maria, Leandro Paredes and Lionel Scaloni in this memorable event. While Messi managed to score, the outcome favored Boca with a score of 5–3.

== International career ==
After a successful stint with Argentina's under-20 team, Riquelme was called up to the Argentina national team by coach Daniel Passarella for their last qualifying match for the 1998 World Cup on 16 November 1997. A 19-year-old Riquelme debuted for Argentina when he entered the field in the last minutes of the 1–1 draw against Colombia at La Bombonera. His first major tournament for Argentina was at the 1999 Copa América.

In 2000, Riquelme participated at the 2000 CONMEBOL Men Pre-Olympic Tournament, which saw Argentina fail to qualify for the 2000 Summer Olympics. He appeared three times and scored one goal during the competition. Riquelme scored his first international goal in a 3–1 away victory during a friendly against Libya in Tripoli on 30 April 2003. On 17 November 2004, Riquelme scored his second international goal for Argentina during a 3–2 home victory in a 2006 FIFA World Cup qualification match against Venezuela. Before departing for the 2005 FIFA Confederations Cup, Riquelme scored in Argentina's 3–1 home victory against Brazil on 8 June, during their 2006 FIFA World Cup qualifier in Buenos Aires. On 9 October 2005, Riquelme scored his seventh international goal in a 2–0 home victory against Peru during a 2006 FIFA World Cup qualification match. Riquelme scored a penalty in the 81st minute. Riquelme's eighth international goal came in a 1–0 victory over Qatar in a friendly match in Doha on 16 November 2005.

In 2006, Riquelme was named captain of the Argentina national football team by new coach Alfio Basile. After a 3–0 defeat again in Brazil, Riquelme had received a lot of criticism and responsibility for the defeat. Riquelme's mother had been hospitalized twice in two months after the 2006 World Cup, and this led to Riquelme publicly announcing his international retirement from the Argentina national team on 13 September 2006. At that point, Riquelme had made 37 international appearances and had scored eight goals. On 13 October 2007, Riquelme emerged from three months of inactivity at Villarreal to score two free-kicks in a 2–0 win against Chile to get Argentina off to a winning start in the 2010 World Cup qualifiers. On 17 November, Riquelme again netted twice in Argentina's 3–0 home victory against Bolivia, again during a 2010 World Cup qualifier match. This brought him to a total of 17 international goals. In March 2009, Riquelme decided to retire from the national team after a disagreement with coach Diego Maradona. Former manager Sergio Batista stated he would have liked for Riquelme to return to international play, hinting at the possibility of the player appearing in a friendly with Spain in August 2010, which eventually did not happen.

In 2011, Riquelme was called up to the Argentina national team by coach Alejandro Sabella for the Superclásico de las Américas, however he eventually withdrew his position from the squad due to injuries from club matches which would leave him unable to complete two games in a matter of days.

=== Youth ===
==== 1997 South American Youth Championship ====
Under coach José Pekerman, Riquelme was called up to the Argentina national under-20 football team for the 1997 South American Youth Championship held in Chile. He played in all 9 matches of the tournament and scored three goals. Argentina went on to win the tournament, gaining their second South American Youth Championship in thirty years. Riquelme, alongside Walter Samuel and Pablo Aimar, were selected in the team of the tournament, by a group of journalists who were registered at the tournament. Argentina's win secured their qualification for the 1997 FIFA World Youth Championship in Malaysia.

==== 1997 FIFA World Youth Championship ====
Riquleme was selected as captain of Argentina for the 1997 FIFA World Youth Championship and played in all three group stage matches. He scored Argentina's third goal in the 50th minute of their 3–0 victory against Hungary on 18 June 1997. He then scored a 55th-minute winner in Argentina's 2–1 win against Canada on 20 June 1997. In Argentina's final group stage match, against Australia, Riquelme scored an 88th-minute penalty to level the scores at 3–3 before Australia scored a 90th-minute penalty to win the game. Argentina had gained six points and finished in second in their group, advancing to the stage of the tournament. On 26 June 1997, Argentina faced England in the round of 16, where Riquelme scored a tenth-minute penalty as Argentina claimed a 2–1 victory. Argentina went on to defeat Brazil 2–0 in the quarter-final, the Republic of Ireland 1–0 in the semi-final, and came from behind to beat Uruguay 2–1 in the final, claiming their third FIFA World Youth Championship. Riquelme had scored four goals for the tournament and Argentina were awarded with the FIFA Fair Play Award.

==== 1998 Toulon Tournament ====
In May 1998, José Pékerman again included Riquelme in Argentina's under-20 squad for the 1998 Toulon Tournament, held in France. Argentina triumphed 2–0 against France in the final as Riquelme played all five matches of the tournament and was named as Player of the Tournament.

=== Senior ===
==== 1999 Copa América ====
Riquelme was included in Argentina's 22-man squad for the 1999 Copa América in Paraguay, wearing the number 22 shirt. He was one of six Boca Juniors players selected in the squad. He played in Argentina's opening group stage match, a 3–1 victory against Ecuador on 1 July 1999. He was replaced in the 90th minute for Diego Cagna. in Argentina's second group stage fixture, on 4 July 1999, Riquelme played the full 90 minutes in a 3–0 loss against Colombia. On 7 July 1999, he again played the full 90 minutes in Argentina's third group stage match, a 2–0 victory over Uruguay. Argentina finished in second place of their respective group with six points, facing Brazil in the quarter-finals on 11 July 1999. Riquelme played in the entire match of Argentina's 2–1 defeat, having been in front 1–0 until the 32nd minute of the match.

==== 2005 FIFA Confederations Cup ====
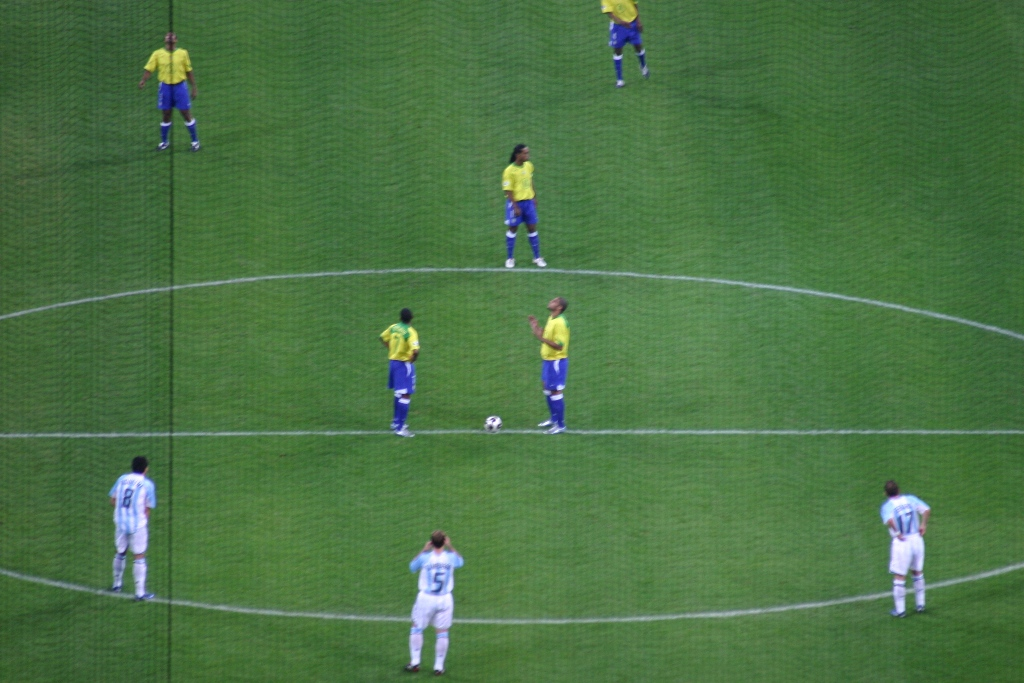
Riquelme #8 before the kick-off of the final

Under former national youth team coach José Pékerman, Riquelme was selected for the 2005 FIFA Confederations Cup in June, where he wore the number 8 shirt. He played in Argentina's opening group stage match against Tunisia on 15 June, opening the scoring for Argentina by converting a penalty in the 33rd minute as Argentina eventually claimed a 2–1 victory. On 18 June, Argentina faced Australia in the second group stage match. Already winning 1–0, Riquelme scored a 31st-minute penalty to give Argentina a 2–0 lead as they went on to win 4–2. In Argentina's third group stage match, against hosts Germany on 21 June, Riquelme scored a 33rd-minute equaliser for Argentina just four minutes after Germany had taken the lead. The match finished at 2–2 as Argentina had claimed seven points, along with Germany, and progressed to the next round of the tournament.

On 26 June, Argentina faced Mexico in the semi-final. After extra time, the match was tied at 1–1 and led to a penalty shoot-out. Riquelme converted Argentina's first spot kick as they won 6–5 on penalties, with Argentina successfully converting each penalty. On 29 June, Argentina faced Brazil in the final. Riquelme played the full 90 minutes as Argentina were defeated 4–1 at the Commerzbank-Arena in Frankfurt. Riquelme was awarded as the Silver Ball Winner, being the second best player at the tournament.

==== 2006 FIFA World Cup ====
Again under coach José Pékerman, Riquelme was included in the Argentina 23-man squad for the 2006 World Cup, where he was given the number 10 shirt for the first time in history. Argentina were drawn against Netherlands, Serbia and Montenegro and the Ivory Coast in what was regarded as the tournament's "group of death". On 10 June, he started in Argentina's opening group stage match against the Ivory Coast. Argentina had been leading 1–0 before Riquelme assisted Javier Saviola in scoring Argentina's second goal in their 2–1 victory. Riquelme was then substituted off of the field for Pablo Aimar in the 93rd minute. On 16 June, Argentina faced Serbia and Montenegro in Gelsenkirchen, where Riquelme played the full 90 minutes of an eventual 6–0 victory for Argentina. Riquelme was the key in a sequence of 24 passes made by the Argentine team, setting up their second goal scored by Esteban Cambiasso when he fed Saviola, who slipped a pass inside for Cambiasso; Cambiasso then knocked the ball to Hernán Crespo, who back-heeled a return pass back to Cambiasso, who then netted from 12 yards. Crespo described the movement as "the most beautiful goal". Riquelme also assisted Argentina in scoring their fourth goal, quickly taking a free-kick which was played to Lionel Messi, who crossed the ball in for Crespo to score at the far post. Riquelme was awarded as the Man of the Match.

On 21 June, Argentina drew 0–0 with the Netherlands in Frankfurt in the last group-stage fixture. Riquelme was substituted off in the 80th minute for Pablo Aimar as Argentina finished in first place of their group, along with the Netherlands, with seven points. On 24 June, Riquelme celebrated his 28th birthday as Argentina faced Mexico in the round of 16. After Mexico had taken a sixth-minute lead through Rafael Márquez, Riquelme had taken a corner-kick in the tenth minute which saw Hernán Crespo flick the ball into the net. The match stayed level until extra time when Maxi Rodríguez scored in the 98th minute to send Argentina through to the quarter-finals. Argentina faced hosts Germany in the quarter-finals on 30 June. In the 49th minute, Riquelme delivered in a corner pin-pointing Roberto Ayala, who headered the ball into the net, giving Argentina a 1–0 lead. Riquelme was then replaced in the 72nd minute by substitute Esteban Cambiasso. Moments later, Germany had equalized in the 80th minute through Miroslav Klose. The match was decided via a penalty shoot-out, which Germany won 4–2.

==== 2007 Copa América ====
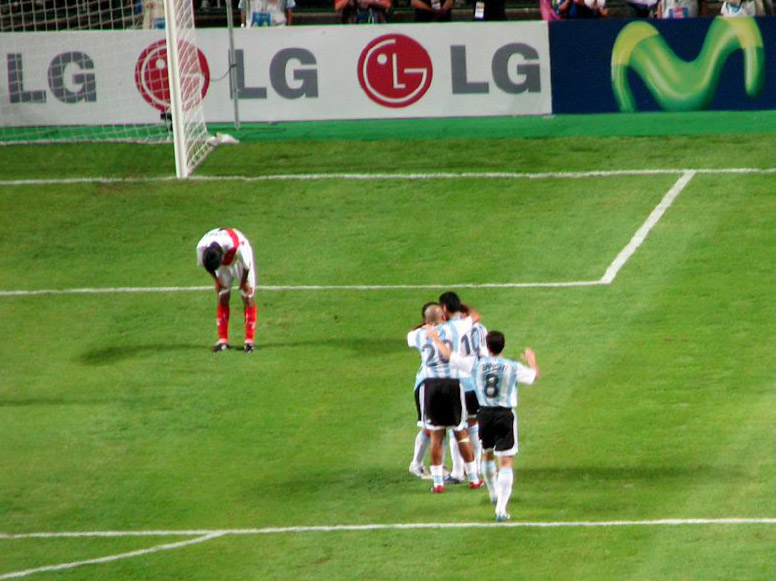
Riquelme #10 celebrates a goal against Peru at the 2007 Copa América

On 26 June 2007, Riquelme was recalled to the national team by coach Alfio Basile as part of Argentina's 23-man squad for 2007 Copa América. During the early morning after Boca Juniors had claimed the 2007 Copa Libertadores, Riquelme hurriedly returned to Buenos Aires and departed with the Argentina national team to Venezuela for the tournament. On 28 June, Riquelme featured in Argentina's opening group stage match, a 4–1 victory against the United States. On 2 July, Argentina faced Colombia in their second group stage match. Riquelme netted twice, with a header in the 34th minute and then with a free-kick in the 45th minute, as Argentina won the match, 4–2.

Argentina went on to win their final group stage match against Paraguay on 5 July, finishing in first place in their group with nine points. On 8 July, Argentina faced Peru in the quarter-finals, where Riquelme scored another two goals, one with each foot in the 47th and 85th minute, and also assisted Messi in scoring in the 61st minute of the match. In the semi-final on 11 July, Argentina defeated Mexico, 3–0, as Riquelme assisted Gabriel Heinze in scoring Argentina's first goal of the match in the 45th minute, and also scored his fifth goal of the tournament – Argentina's third of the match – when he converted a penalty in the 65th minute. On 15 July, Argentina faced Brazil in the final. Riquelme played the full 90 minutes of the match as Argentina were defeated, 3–0. Riquelme had scored five goals and was awarded as the tournament's second-leading goalscorer.

==== 2008 Summer Olympics ====
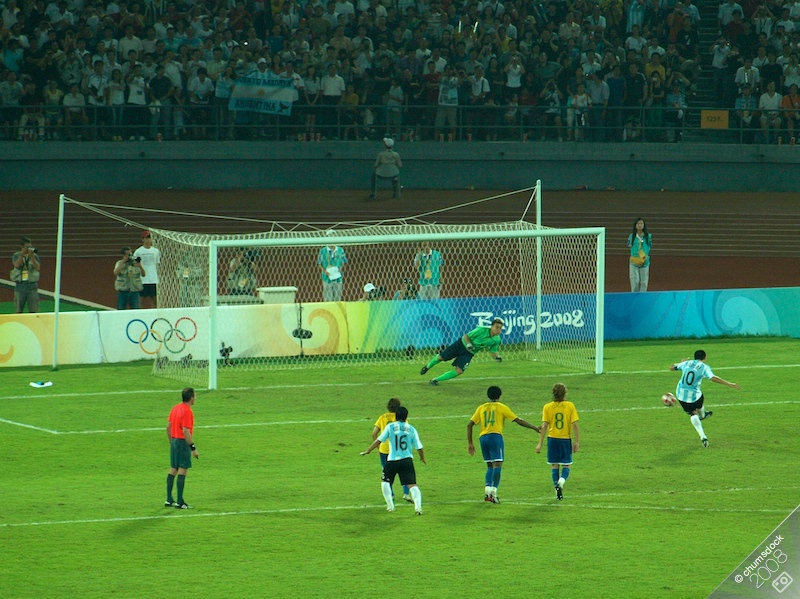
Riquelme scoring a penalty against Brazil

In August 2008, Riquelme was included as an overage player, and also named captain, by Sergio Batista for Argentina's 19-man squad for the 2008 Summer Olympics football tournament in Beijing. He had joined Javier Mascherano and Nicolás Pareja as the three over-aged players in the squad. Argentina were drawn in Group A against the Ivory Coast, Australia and Serbia. On 7 August, Riquelme played the full 90 minutes of Argentina's opening group stage fixture as they defeated Ivory Coast 2–1. Three days later, Riquelme also played another 90 minutes in Argentina's 1–0 victory against Australia on 10 August. Riquelme then rested on the bench in Argentina's third group-stage fixture, giving the captain's armband to Javier Mascherano, where they defeated Serbia 2–0 on 13 August to claim maximum points in the group and to finish in first place.

On 16 August, Riquelme featured in Argentina's 2–1 quarter-final victory against the Netherlands, advancing to the semi-finals. On 19 August, Argentina faced Brazil in the semi-finals, when after two Sergio Agüero goals, Riquelme scored a 76th-minute penalty to give Argentina a 3–0 victory. On 23 August, Argentina faced Nigeria in the final in front of 89,102 spectators at the Beijing National Stadium, where Argentina defeated Nigeria 1–0 to claim its second consecutive gold medal at the Summer Olympics.

== Style of play ==
Considered one of the best playmakers in the world in his prime, as well as one of the most talented Argentine players of his generation, Riquelme was a "classic number ten", who was best known for his grace, flair, and elegance on the pitch, as well as his creative and intelligent passing. A tall and slender offensive midfield playmaker, he combined outstanding passing range, vision, anticipation, technique, close control, and dribbling skills with prolific goalscoring ability from midfield. A selfless team player, he usually played in a free central role, operating as an attacking midfielder behind the strikers (known as the "enganche" in Argentina), but was also capable of playing in a more withdrawn position as a deep-lying playmaker, due to his ability to dictate the tempo of his team's play in midfield, orchestrate attacking moves, and create space and chances for teammates. He has been recognised as one of the "last true number 10s" due to his playmaking abilities and unique playing style. During his time under Van Gaal at Barcelona, Riquelme was also occasionally deployed out of position as a right winger. His skill and creative style of play drew comparisons with Diego Maradona, in his youth, even though, unlike Maradona, Riquelme was neither quick nor a particularly energetic dribbler. A tactically astute player, he also possessed good decision-making, and a good understanding of the game. Moreover, he was an excellent free kick taker. Despite his talent, however, Riquelme was notorious for his lack of pace, for being inconsistent, and for having an introverted yet difficult character, as well as for his poor work-rate, both on the pitch and in training, which led him to have disagreements with several of his managers.

== Second Vice-President ==
On 8 December 2019, the formula headed by Jorge Amor Ameal, Mario Pergolini and Juan Román Riquelme was chosen with 52.84% of the votes, achieving the historical record in Argentine football of 20,045 votes in total. They took office on 13 December 2019.

On Saturday, 7 March 2020 (85 days after taking office), he obtained his first title as Second Vice-President. Boca Juniors wins the 2019–20 Superliga beating the River Plate led by Marcelo Gallardo in the final stretch.

In 2023, Riquelme and Ameal ran on a ticket against incumbent Andrés Ibarra for the overall club presidency. Riquelme's slate won with just under 65% of the vote, in an election which saw more than 43,000 members — roughly 46% of Boca's enrolled membership — cast a ballot.

== Personal life ==
Riquelme's brother, Sebastián, was also a professional footballer. Sebastian retired in 2022.

== Career statistics ==
=== Club ===
Appearances and goals by club, season and competition
Club	Season	League	League		Cup		Continental		Total	
Club	Season	League	Apps	Goals	Apps	Goals	Apps	Goals	Apps	Goals
Boca Juniors	1996–97	Argentine Primera División	22	4					22	4
Boca Juniors	1997–98	Argentine Primera División	19	0			2	0	21	0
Boca Juniors	1998–99	Argentine Primera División	37	10			5	0	42	10
Boca Juniors	1999–2000	Argentine Primera División	24	4			16	3	40	7
Boca Juniors	2000–01	Argentine Primera División	27	10			14	3	41	13
Boca Juniors	2001–02	Argentine Primera División	22	10			6	0	28	10
Boca Juniors	Total		151	38			43	6	194	44
Barcelona	2002–03	La Liga	30	3	1	1	11	2	42	6
Villarreal (loan)	2003–04	La Liga	33	8	3	1	12	4	48	13
Villarreal (loan)	2004–05	La Liga	35	15	0	0	11	2	46	17
Villarreal	2005–06	La Liga	25	12	1	0	12	2	38	14
Villarreal	2006–07	La Liga	13	1	0	0	0	0	13	1
Villarreal	Total		106	36	4	1	35	8	145	45
Boca Juniors (loan)	2007	Argentine Primera División	15	2			11	8	26	10
Boca Juniors	2007–08	Argentine Primera División	10	1			10	4	20	5
Boca Juniors	2008–09	Argentine Primera División	28	5			7	4	35	9
Boca Juniors	2009–10	Argentine Primera División	24	3			2	0	26	3
Boca Juniors	2010–11	Argentine Primera División	13	4					13	4
Boca Juniors	2011–12	Argentine Primera División	23	4	2	1	13	3	38	8
Boca Juniors	2012–13	Argentine Primera División	5	0	1	0	7	2	13	2
Boca Juniors	2013–14	Argentine Primera División	23	7	0	0	0	0	23	7
Boca Juniors	Total		141	26	3	1	50	21	194	48
Argentinos Juniors	2013–14	Argentine Primera División	0	0	3	2	0	0	3	2
Argentinos Juniors	2014–15	Primera B Nacional	15	3	3	2	0	0	18	5
Argentinos Juniors	Total		15	3	3	2	0	0	18	5
Career total			443	106	14	7	139	37	596	150

=== International ===
Appearances and goals by national team and year
National team	Year	Apps	Goals
Argentina	1997	1	0
Argentina	1998	0	0
Argentina	1999	5	0
Argentina	2000	0	0
Argentina	2001	0	0
Argentina	2002	1	0
Argentina	2003	3	1
Argentina	2004	6	1
Argentina	2005	13	6
Argentina	2006	8	0
Argentina	2007	9	9
Argentina	2008	5	0
Total		51	17

Scores and results list Argentina's goal tally first, score column indicates score after each Riquelme goal.

List of international goals scored by Juan Román Riquelme
No.	Date	Venue	Opponent	Score	Result	Competition
1	30 April 2003	June 11 Stadium, Tripoli, Libya	Libya	2–1	3–1	Friendly
2	17 November 2004	El Monumental, Buenos Aires, Argentina	Venezuela	2–1	3–2	2006 FIFA World Cup qualification
3	8 June 2005	El Monumental, Buenos Aires, Argentina	Brazil	2–0	3–1	2006 FIFA World Cup qualification
4	15 June 2005	Stadium Cologne, Cologne, Germany	Tunisia	1–0	2–1	2005 FIFA Confederations Cup
5	18 June 2005	EasyCredit-Stadion, Nuremberg, Germany	Australia	2–0	4–2	2005 FIFA Confederations Cup
6	21 June 2005	EasyCredit-Stadion, Nuremberg, Germany	Germany	1–1	2–2	2005 FIFA Confederations Cup
7	9 October 2005	El Monumental, Buenos Aires, Argentina	Peru	1–0	2–0	2006 FIFA World Cup qualification
8	16 November 2005	Jassim Bin Hamad Stadium, Doha, Qatar	Qatar	1–0	3–0	Friendly
9	2 July 2007	José Pachencho Romero, Maracaibo, Venezuela	Colombia	2–1	4–2	2007 Copa América
10	2 July 2007	José Pachencho Romero, Maracaibo, Venezuela	Colombia	3–1	4–2	2007 Copa América
11	8 July 2007	Estadio Metropolitano, Barquisimeto, Venezuela	Peru	1–0	4–0	2007 Copa América
12	8 July 2007	Estadio Metropolitano, Barquisimeto, Venezuela	Peru	4–0	4–0	2007 Copa América
13	11 July 2007	Polideportivo Cachamay, Puerto Ordaz, Venezuela	Mexico	3–0	3–0	2007 Copa América
14	13 October 2007	El Monumental, Buenos Aires, Argentina	Chile	1–0	2–0	2010 FIFA World Cup qualification
15	13 October 2007	El Monumental, Buenos Aires, Argentina	Chile	2–0	2–0	2010 FIFA World Cup qualification
16	17 November 2007	El Monumental, Buenos Aires, Argentina	Bolivia	2–0	3–0	2010 FIFA World Cup qualification
17	17 November 2007	El Monumental, Buenos Aires, Argentina	Bolivia	3–0	3–0	2010 FIFA World Cup qualification

== Honours ==
Boca Juniors

- Argentine Primera División: 1998 Apertura, 1999 Clausura, 2000 Apertura, 2008 Apertura, 2011 Apertura
- Copa Argentina: 2012
- Copa Libertadores: 2000, 2001, 2007
- Recopa Sudamericana: 2008
- Intercontinental Cup: 2000

Villarreal

- UEFA Intertoto Cup: 2004

Argentina U20

- FIFA World Youth Championship: 1997
- South American U-20 Championship: 1997

Argentina U21

- Toulon Tournament: 1998

Argentina U23

- Olympic Gold Medal: 2008

Argentina

- Copa América runner-up: 2007
- FIFA Confederations Cup runner-up: 2005

Individual

- Toulon Tournament Best Player: 1998
- South American Team of the Year: 1999, 2000, 2001, 2008, 2011
- Argentine Footballer of the Year: 2000, 2001, 2008, 2011
- Copa Libertadores Finals Most Valuable Player: 2001, 2007
- South American Footballer of the Year: 2001
- La Liga Don Balón Award (Foreign Player of the Year): 2004–05
- Most Artistic Player by Marca: 2005
- FIFA Confederations Cup Silver Ball: 2005
- FIFA World Cup top assist provider: 2006
- Copa Libertadores Player of the Week: May 8–10/2012
- The Best Argentine midfielder by Olé: 2012
- The Best local Argentine player by Olé: 2012
- The Historical Team for Copa Libertadores of all time
- FIFPro World XI Nominee: 2006, 2007
- Ballon d'Or Nominee: 2005, 2007 (14th)

== See also ==
- List of Boca Juniors chairmen
