= 1999 Ballon d'Or =

Annual association football award event in France

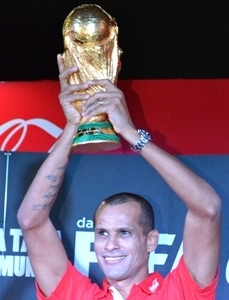
- 1999 Ballon d'Or winner, Rivaldo in 2014
- Date: 21 December 1999
- Presented by: France Football

Highlights
- Won by: (Brazil) Rivaldo (1st award)
- Website: ballondor.com

The 1999 Ballon d'Or, given to the best football player in Europe as judged by a panel of sports journalists from UEFA member countries, was awarded to Rivaldo on 21 December 1999. On 22 November 2000, the shortlist of 50 male players compiled by a group of experts from France Football was announced.

== Rankings ==
Rank	Player	Club(s)	Nationality	Points
1	Rivaldo	(Spain) Barcelona	Brazil	219
2	David Beckham	(England) Manchester United	England	154
3	Andriy Shevchenko	(Ukraine) Dynamo Kyiv (Italy) Milan	Ukraine	64
4	Gabriel Batistuta	(Italy) Fiorentina	Argentina	48
5	Luís Figo	(Spain) Barcelona	Portugal	38
6	Roy Keane	(England) Manchester United	Republic of Ireland	36
7	Christian Vieri	(Italy) Lazio (Italy) Internazionale	Italy; Australia	33
8	Juan Sebastián Verón	(Italy) Parma (Italy) Lazio	Argentina	30
9	Raúl	(Spain) Real Madrid	Spain	27
10	Lothar Matthäus	(Germany) Bayern Munich	Germany	16
11	Dwight Yorke	(England) Manchester United	Trinidad and Tobago	14
12	Jaap Stam	(England) Manchester United	Netherlands	13
13	Siniša Mihajlović	(Italy) Lazio	FR Yugoslavia	12
14	Zlatko Zahovič	(Greece) Olympiacos	Slovenia	9
15	Pavel Nedvěd	(Italy) Lazio	Czech Republic	8
16	Mário Jardel	(Portugal) Porto	Brazil	7
17	Peter Schmeichel	(England) Manchester United (Portugal) Sporting CP	Denmark; Poland	6
18	Stefan Effenberg	(Germany) Bayern Munich	Germany	5
19	Zinedine Zidane	(Italy) Juventus	France	4
19	Oliver Bierhoff	(Italy) Milan	Germany	4
21	Mario Basler	(Germany) Bayern Munich (Germany) Kaiserslautern	Germany	3
21	Ryan Giggs	(England) Manchester United	Wales	3
23	Hernán Crespo	(Italy) Parma	Argentina	2
23	Nwankwo Kanu	(England) Arsenal	Nigeria	2
23	Ronaldo	(Italy) Internazionale	Brazil	2
26	Andy Cole	(England) Manchester United	England; Jamaica	1
26	Edgar Davids	(Italy) Juventus	Netherlands; Suriname	1
26	David Ginola	(England) Tottenham Hotspur	France	1
26	Claudio López	(Spain) Valencia	Argentina	1
26	Roberto Carlos	(Spain) Real Madrid	Brazil	1
26	Marcelo Salas	(Italy) Lazio	Chile	1

Additionally, 22 players were nominated but received no votes: Fabien Barthez (Monaco & France), Dennis Bergkamp (Arsenal and Netherlands), Laurent Blanc (Marseille/Inter Milan & France), Gianluigi Buffon (Parma & Italy), Frank de Boer (Ajax/Barcelona & Netherlands), Marcel Desailly (Chelsea & France), Giovane Élber (Bayern Munich & Brazil), Pep Guardiola (Barcelona & Spain), Filippo Inzaghi (Juventus & Italy), Patrick Kluivert (Barcelona & Netherlands), Paolo Maldini (Milan & Italy), Fernando Morientes (Real Madrid & Spain), Hidetoshi Nakata (Perugia & Japan), Emmanuel Petit (Arsenal & France), Gus Poyet (Chelsea & Uruguay), Oleksandr Shovkovskyi (Dynamo Kyiv & Ukraine), Lilian Thuram (Parma & France), Sylvain Wiltord (Bordeaux & France) and Gianfranco Zola (Chelsea & Italy).
