= Mexico national football team results (2000–2019) =

This article provides details of international football games played by the Mexico national football team from 2000 to 2019.

== Results ==
Key
Win
Draw
Defeat

=== 2000 ===
9 January 2000 Friendly	Mexico	2–1	Iran	Oakland, United States
15:00	Hernández 3'; Blanco 19'	Report	Daei 26' (pen.)	Stadium: Coliseum; Attendance: 34,289; Referee: Ricardo Valenzuela (United States)

5 February 2000 2000 Carlsberg Cup SF	Mexico	1–0	Japan	Hong Kong
	Zepeda 55'			Stadium: Hong Kong Stadium; Referee: Hugh Dallas (Scotland)

8 February 2000 2000 Carlsberg Cup SF	Mexico	1–2	Czech Republic	Hong Kong
	Zepeda 80'		Kolomazník 59'; Verbíř 55'	Stadium: Hong Kong Stadium; Referee: Kim Milton Nielsen (Denmark)

13 February 2000 2000 CONCACAF Gold Cup	Mexico	4–0	Trinidad and Tobago	San Diego, United States
14:00 ET	Márquez 36'; Hernández 52'; David 75' (o.g.); Palencia 85'	Report		Stadium: Qualcomm Stadium; Attendance: 22,131; Referee: Rafael Rodríguez (El Salvador)

17 February 2000 2000 CONCACAF Gold Cup	Guatemala	1–1	Mexico	Los Angeles, United States
19:00 ET	Miranda 28'	Report	Mora 26'	Stadium: Los Angeles Memorial Coliseum; Attendance: 54,246; Referee: Gustavo Méndez (Uruguay)

20 February 2000 2000 CONCACAF Gold Cup	Mexico	1–2 (a.e.t.)	Canada	San Diego, United States
14:30 ET	Ramírez 35'	Report	Corazzin 83'; Hastings 92'	Stadium: Qualcomm Stadium; Attendance: 18,062; Referee: Peter Prendergast (Jamaica)

4 July 2000 2000 U.S. Cup	Republic of Ireland	2–2	Mexico	Chicago, United States
16:30	Dunne 60'; Foley 71'	(Report)	Osorno 38'; Sánchez 54'	Stadium: Soldier Field; Attendance: 36,469; Referee: Kevin Stott (United States)

7 June 2000 2000 U.S. Cup	Mexico	4–2	South Africa	Dallas, United States
20:00	Olalde 39'; Pérez 43'; Sánchez 80', 83'	(Report)	McCarthy 52'; Mngomeni 89'	Stadium: Cotton Bowl; Attendance: 27,815; Referee: Brian Hall (United States)

11 June 2000 2000 U.S. Cup	United States	3–0	Mexico	East Rutherford, United States
13:00	McBride 33'; Hejduk 79'; Razov 85'			Stadium: Giants Stadium; Attendance: 45,008; Referee: Prendergast (Jamaica)

16 July 2000 2002 World Cup qualification SF	Panama	0–1	Mexico	Panama City, Panama
		Report	Zepeda 88'	Stadium: Estadio Rommel Fernández; Attendance: 21,000; Referee: Brian Hall (United States)

23 July 2000 2002 World Cup qualification SF	Trinidad and Tobago	1–0	Mexico	Port of Spain, Trinidad and Tobago
	Latapy 86'	Report		Stadium: Hasely Crawford Stadium; Attendance: 20,000; Referee: Kevin Stott (USA)

15 August 2000 2002 World Cup qualification SF	Mexico	2–0	Canada	Mexico City, Mexico
	Abundis 48'; Fenwick 81' (o.g.)	Report		Stadium: Estadio Azteca; Attendance: 60,000; Referee: William Mattus (CRC)

3 September 2000 2002 World Cup qualification SF	Mexico	7–1	Panama	Mexico City, Mexico
	Ruiz 8' (pen.); Abundis 36'; Zepeda 44'; Blanco 47', 90' (pen.); Márquez 54'; Ramírez 75'	Report	Dely Valdés 54'	Stadium: Estadio Azteca; Attendance: 70,000; Referee: Nelson Calix (HON)

8 October 2000 2002 World Cup qualification SF	Mexico	7–0	Trinidad and Tobago	Mexico City, Mexico
	Blanco 20', 28' (pen.); Borgetti 26', 30', 71'; Davino 66'; Ruiz 75' (pen.)	Report		Stadium: Estadio Azteca; Attendance: 50,000; Referee: Carlos Batros Gonzalez (GUA)

15 November 2000 2002 World Cup qualification SF	Canada	0–0	Mexico	Toronto, Canada
		Report		Stadium: Varsity Stadium; Attendance: 6,564; Referee: Samuel Richard (DOM)

=== 2001 ===
31 January 2001 Friendly	Colombia	3–2	Mexico	Los Angeles, United States
	Bedoya 40'; Vásquez 63'; Salazar 90'	Report	Suárez 10'; Hernández 15'	Stadium: Los Angeles Memorial Coliseum; Attendance: 20,000; Referee: Brian Hall (United States)

28 February 2001 2002 World Cup qualification FR	United States	2–0	Mexico	Columbus, United States
	Wolff 47'; Stewart 87'	(Report)		Stadium: Columbus Crew Stadium; Attendance: 24,329; Referee: Rodolfo Sibrian (SLV)

25 March 2001 2002 World Cup qualification FR	Mexico	4–0	Jamaica	Mexico City, Mexico
	de Nigris 15', 18'; Borgetti 84', 88'	(Report)		Stadium: Estadio Azteca; Attendance: 80,000; Referee: Mauricio Navarro (CAN)

25 April 2001 2002 World Cup qualification FR	Trinidad and Tobago	1–1	Mexico	Port of Spain, Trinidad and Tobago
	Andrews 14'	(Report)	Pardo 61'	Stadium: Queen's Park Oval; Attendance: 8,000; Referee: Saad Mane (KUW)

30 May 2001 2001 FIFA Confederations Cup	Mexico	0–2	Australia	Suwon, South Korea
19:30 KST		Report	Murphy 20'; Skoko 54'	Stadium: Suwon World Cup Stadium; Attendance: 6,232; Referee: Felix Tangawarima (Zimbabwe)

1 June 2001 2001 FIFA Confederations Cup	South Korea	2–1	Mexico	Ulsan, South Korea
19:30 KST	Hwang Sun-hong 56'; Yoo Sang-chul 90'	Report	V. Ruiz 81'	Stadium: Ulsan Munsu Football Stadium; Attendance: 41,550; Referee: Hugh Dallas (Scotland)

3 June 2001 2001 FIFA Confederations Cup	France	4–0	Mexico	Ulsan, South Korea
19:30 KST	Wiltord 9'; Carrière 63', 84'; Pires 72'	Report		Stadium: Ulsan Munsu Football Stadium; Attendance: 28,864; Referee: Ali Bujsaim (United Arab Emirates)

16 June 2001 2002 World Cup qualification FR	Mexico	1–2	Costa Rica	Mexico City, Mexico
	Abundis 7'	(Report)	Fonseca 73'; Medford 87'	Stadium: Estadio Azteca; Attendance: 60,000; Referee: Carlos Batres (GUA)

20 June 2001 2002 World Cup qualification FR	Honduras	3–1	Mexico	San Pedro Sula, Honduras
	Pavón 16', 55', 64' (pen.)	(Report)	Ruiz 86'	Stadium: Estadio Olímpico Metropolitano; Attendance: 50,000; Referee: Horacio Elizondo (ARG)

1 July 2001 2002 World Cup qualification FR	Mexico	1–0	United States	Mexico City, Mexico
	Borgetti 15'	(Report)		Stadium: Estadio Azteca; Attendance: 110,000; Referee: Kim Young-Joo (KOR)

12 July 2001 2001 Copa América	Brazil	0–1	Mexico	Cali, Colombia
19:45			Borgetti 5'	Stadium: Estadio Pascual Guerrero; Referee: Óscar Ruiz (Colombia)

15 July 2001 2001 Copa América	Paraguay	0–0	Mexico	Cali, Colombia
18:15				Stadium: Estadio Pascual Guerrero; Referee: Roger Zambrano (Ecuador)

18 July 2001 2001 Copa América	Peru	1–0	Mexico	Cali, Colombia
17:30	Holsen 48'			Stadium: Estadio Pascual Guerrero; Referee: René Ortube (Bolivia)

22 July 2001 2001 Copa América QF	Chile	0–2	Mexico	Pereira, Colombia
15:00			Arellano 17'; Osorno 78'	Stadium: Estadio Hernán Ramírez Villegas; Attendance: 20,000; Referee: Carlos Eugênio Simon (Brazil)

25 July 2001 2001 Copa América SF	Mexico	2–1	Uruguay	Pereira, Colombia
19:45	Borgetti 14'; García Aspe 67' (pen.)		R. Morales 32'	Stadium: Estadio Hernán Ramírez Villegas; Attendance: 20,000; Referee: Ángel Sánchez (Argentina)

29 July 2001 2001 Copa América F	Colombia	1–0	Mexico	Bogotá, Colombia
16:30	I. Córdoba 65'	Report		Stadium: Estadio El Campín; Attendance: 47,000; Referee: Ubaldo Aquino (Paraguay)

2 September 2001 2002 World Cup qualification FR	Jamaica	1–2	Mexico	Kingston, Jamaica
	Morales 11' (o.g.)	(Report)	Blanco 68', 76'	Stadium: Independence Park; Attendance: 35,000; Referee: Gamal Ghandour (EGY)

5 September 2001 2002 World Cup qualification FR	Mexico	3–0	Trinidad and Tobago	Mexico City, Mexico
	Garcia Aspe 25' (pen.); Arellano 44'; Blanco 86' (pen.)	(Report)		Stadium: Estadio Azteca; Attendance: 75,000; Referee: Jose Farias Martinez (CAN)

7 October 2001 2002 World Cup qualification FR	Costa Rica	0–0	Mexico	San José, Costa Rica
		(Report)		Stadium: Estadio Ricardo Saprissa; Attendance: 24,000; Referee: Antonio Pereira da Silva (BRA)

11 November 2001 2002 World Cup qualification FR	Mexico	3–0	Honduras	Mexico City, Mexico
	Blanco 65', 78' (pen.); Palencia 72'	(Report)		Stadium: Estadio Azteca; Attendance: 105,405; Referee: Carlos Batres (GUA)

14 November 2001 Friendly	Spain	1–0	Mexico	Huelva, Spain
	Raúl 72'			Stadium: Nuevo Colombino

=== 2002 ===
19 January 2002 2002 CONCACAF Gold Cup	El Salvador	0–1	Mexico	Pasadena, United States
13:00 UTC−8		Report	García 31'	Stadium: Rose Bowl; Attendance: 42,117; Referee: Rogger Zambrano (Ecuador)

21 January 2002 2002 CONCACAF Gold Cup	Mexico	3–1	Guatemala	Pasadena, United States
17:00 UTC−8	Bautista 28'; Garcés 38'; Ochoa 90'	Report	Plata 36'	Stadium: Rose Bowl; Attendance: 31,244; Referee: Peter Prendergast (Jamaica)

27 January 2002 2002 CONCACAF Gold Cup QF	Mexico	0–0 (a.e.t.) (2–4 p)	South Korea	Pasadena, United States
12:00 UTC−8		Report		Stadium: Rose Bowl; Attendance: 31,628; Referee: José Pineda (Honduras)
	Penalties
	Noriega (penalty scored); De Anda (penalty scored); Sosa (penalty missed); Hierro (penalty missed)		(penalty scored) Lee Eul-Yong; (penalty scored) Lee Dong-Gook; (penalty scored) Choi Sung-Yong; (penalty scored) Lee Young-Pyo

13 February 2002 Friendly	Yugoslavia	2–1	Mexico	Phoenix, Arizona
	Kežman 33'; Milošević 44'	Report	Mendoza 75'	Stadium: Bank One Ballpark; Referee: Kevin Stott (USA)

13 March 2002 Friendly	Mexico	4–0	Albania	San Diego, United States
	Borgetti 24'; Morales 30'; Bautista 52', 90'	Report		Stadium: Qualcomm Stadium; Attendance: 32,109; Referee: Kevin Stott (USA)

3 April 2002 Friendly	United States	1–0	Mexico	Denver, United States
20:00 UTC−07	Mathis 66'; Hejduk (red card) 90'	Report	García Aspe (red card) 90'	Stadium: Invesco Field at Mile High; Attendance: 48,476; Referee: Clive Wright (Jamaica)

17 April 2002 Friendly	Mexico	1–0	Bulgaria	East Rutherford, United States
	de Anda 89'	Report		Stadium: Giants Stadium; Attendance: 42,591; Referee: Ali Saheli (United States)

12 May 2002 Friendly	Mexico	2–1	Colombia	Mexico City, Mexico
	Borgetti 52'; Márquez 75'	Report	Restrepo 65'	Stadium: Estadio Azteca; Attendance: 40,000; Referee: Rodolfo Sibrían (El Salvador)

3 June 2002 2002 FIFA World Cup	Croatia	0–1	Mexico	Niigata, Japan
15:30		Report	Blanco 60' (pen.)	Stadium: Niigata Big Swan Stadium; Attendance: 32,239; Referee: Lu Jun (China)

9 June 2002 2002 FIFA World Cup	Mexico	2–1	Ecuador	Miyagi, Japan
15:30	Borgetti 28'; Torrado 57'	Report	Delgado 5'	Stadium: Miyagi Stadium; Attendance: 45,610; Referee: Mourad Daami (Tunisia)

13 June 2002 2002 FIFA World Cup	Mexico	1–1	Italy	Ōita, Japan
20:30	Borgetti 34'	Report	Del Piero 85'	Stadium: Ōita Big Eye Stadium; Attendance: 39,291; Referee: Carlos Simon (Brazil)

17 June 2002 2002 FIFA World Cup R16	Mexico	0–2	United States	Jeonju, South Korea
15:30		Report	McBride 8'; Donovan 65'	Stadium: Jeonju World Cup Stadium; Attendance: 36,380; Referee: Vítor Melo Pereira (Portugal)

=== 2003 ===
4 February 2003 Friendly	Mexico	0–1	Argentina	Los Angeles, United States
			Rodríguez 14'	Stadium: Los Angeles Memorial Coliseum; Referee: Kevin Stott (United States)

12 February 2003 Friendly	Mexico	0–0	Colombia	Phoenix, United States
		Report		Stadium: Bank One Ballpark; Attendance: 28,764; Referee: Ricardo Valenzuela (United States)

19 March 2003 Friendly	Mexico	2–0	Bolivia	Irving, United States
	Pável Pardo 27'; Jesús Olalde 72'			Stadium: Texas Stadium; Referee: Kevin Terry (United States)

26 March 2003 Friendly	Mexico	1–1	Paraguay	San Diego, United States
	Patiño 72'		Cardozo 75'	Stadium: Qualcomm Stadium; Referee: Michael Kennedy (United States)

30 April 2003 Friendly	Mexico	0–0	Brazil	Guadalajara, Mexico
				Stadium: Estadio Jalisco; Referee: Óscar Ruiz (Colombia)

8 May 2003 Friendly	Mexico	0–0	United States	Houston, United States
				Stadium: Reliant Stadium; Referee: Peter Prendergast (Jamaica)

13 July 2003 2003 CONCACAF Gold Cup	Mexico	1–0	Brazil	Mexico City, Mexico
12:00	Borgetti 70'	Report		Stadium: Estadio Azteca; Attendance: 75,000; Referee: Rodolfo Sibrián (El Salvador)

17 July 2003 2003 CONCACAF Gold Cup	Honduras	0–0	Mexico	Mexico City, Mexico
21:00		Report		Stadium: Estadio Azteca; Attendance: 20,000; Referee: Alfaro Nery (El Salvador)

20 July 2003 2003 CONCACAF Gold F	Mexico	5–0	Jamaica	Mexico City, Mexico
	Bravo 38'; García 42'; Osorno 55'; Borgetti 61'; Rodríguez 83'	Report		Stadium: Estadio Azteca; Attendance: 10,000; Referee: Mauricio Navarro (Canada)

24 July 2003 2003 CONCACAF Gold F	Mexico	2–0	Costa Rica	Mexico City, Mexico
	Márquez 19'; Borgetti 28'	Report		Stadium: Estadio Azteca; Attendance: 35,000; Referee: Alfaro Nery (El Salvador)

27 July 2003 2003 CONCACAF Gold F	Mexico	1–0 (ASDET)	Brazil	Mexico City, Mexico
	Osorno 97'	Report		Stadium: Estadio Azteca; Attendance: 85,000; Referee: Mauricio Navarro (Canada)

=== 2004 ===
18 February 2004 Friendly	Mexico	1–1	Chile	Carson, United States
	Bravo 49'		Reinaldo Navia 45'	Stadium: Home Depot Center; Referee: Alex Prus (United States)

10 March 2004 Friendly	Mexico	2–1	Ecuador	Tuxtla Gutiérrez, Mexico
	Martínez 23' (pen.); Bravo 30'		Édison Méndez 33' (pen.)	Stadium: Estadio Víctor Manuel Reyna; Attendance: 20,000; Referee: Carlos Batres (Guatemala)

31 February 2004 Friendly	Mexico	2–0	Costa Rica	Carson, United States
	García 13'; Martínez 41'			Stadium: Home Depot Center; Attendance: 27,000; Referee: Kevin Stott (United States)

28 April 2004 Friendly	United States	1–0	Mexico	Dallas, United States
	Pope 90'			Stadium: Cotton Bowl; Attendance: 45,048; Referee: Mauricio Navarro (Canada)

19 June 2004 2006 World Cup qualification R2	Dominica	0–10	Mexico	San Antonio, United States
		Report	Bautista 9', 38'; Borgetti 11', 36'; Márquez 16'; Osorno 49'; Lozano 74', 87'; Davino 77'; Palencia 90+2'	Stadium: Alamodome; Attendance: 36,451; Referee: Barney Callender (Barbados)

27 June 2004 2006 World Cup qualification R2	Mexico	8–0	Dominica	Aguascalientes, Mexico
	Bautista 2', 36'; Lozano 17', 61'; Borgetti 33', 38'; Oteo 59'; Altamirano 76'	Report		Stadium: Estadio Victoria; Attendance: 17,000; Referee: Kevin Stott (USA)

7 July 2004 2004 Copa América	Mexico	2–2	Uruguay	Chiclayo, Peru
	Osorio 45'; Pardo 69'		Bueno 43'; Montero 88'	Stadium: Estadio Elías Aguirre; Referee: Gilberto Hidalgo (Peru)

10 July 2004 2004 Copa América	Argentina	0–1	Mexico	Chiclayo, Peru
			Morales 8'	Stadium: Estadio Elías Aguirre; Referee: Márcio Rezende (Brazil)

13 July 2004 2004 Copa América	Mexico	2–1	Ecuador	Piura, Peru
	Altamirano 23' (pen.); Bautista 42'		Delgado 71'	Stadium: Estadio Miguel Grau; Referee: Eduardo Lecca (Peru)

18 July 2004 2004 Copa América QF	Mexico	0–4	Brazil	Piura, Peru
			Alex 26' (pen.); Adriano 65', 78'; Oliveira 87'	Stadium: Estadio Miguel Grau; Referee: Óscar Ruiz (Colombia)

8 September 2004 2006 World Cup qualification R3	Trinidad and Tobago	1–3	Mexico	Port of Spain, Trinidad and Tobago
8:15 pm	John 39'	Report	Arellano 1', 80'; Borgetti 19'	Stadium: Hasely Crawford Stadium; Attendance: 20,000; Referee: Mauricio Navarro (Canada)

6 October 2004 2006 World Cup qualification R3	Mexico	7–0	Saint Vincent and the Grenadines	Pachuca, Mexico
	Borgetti 31', 68', 77', 89'; Lozano 54', 63'; Santana 81'	Report		Stadium: Estadio Hidalgo; Attendance: 21,000; Referee: Hu Liu (Canada)

10 October 2004 2006 World Cup qualification R3	Saint Vincent and the Grenadines	0–1	Mexico	Kingstown, Saint Vincent and the Grenadines
		Report	Borgetti 25'	Stadium: Arnos Vale Stadium; Attendance: 2,500; Referee: Nery Alfaro (El Salvador)

13 October 2004 2006 World Cup qualification R3	Mexico	3–0	Trinidad and Tobago	Puebla, Mexico
	Sinha 19'; Lozano 55', 84'	Report		Stadium: Estadio Cuauhtémoc; Attendance: 37,000; Referee: Rodolfo Sibrian (El Salvador)

13 November 2004 2006 World Cup qualification R3	Saint Kitts and Nevis	0–5	Mexico	Miami, United States
		Report	Altamirano 31'; Fonseca 40', 57'; Santana 49', 90+1'	Stadium: Miami Orange Bowl; Attendance: 18,312; Referee: Roberto Moreno (Panama)

17 November 2004 2006 World Cup qualification R3	Mexico	8–0	Saint Kitts and Nevis	Monterrey, Mexico
	Altamirano 10' (pen.); Pérez 21', 49', 78'; Fonseca 44', 56'; Osorno 52'; Santana 67'	Report		Stadium: Estadio Tecnológico; Attendance: 12,000; Referee: Kevin Stott (USA)

=== 2005 ===
26 January 2005 Friendly	Mexico	0–0	Sweden	San Diego, United States
				Stadium: Petco Park; Attendance: 35,521; Referee: Brian Hall (United States)

9 February 2005 2006 World Cup qualification R4	Costa Rica	1–2	Mexico	San José, Costa Rica
	Wanchope 38'	Report	Lozano 8', 10'	Stadium: Estadio Ricardo Saprissa; Attendance: 22,000; Referee: Carlos Batres (Guatemala)

23 February 2005 Friendly	Mexico	1–1	Colombia	Culiacán, Mexico
	Fonseca 56'	Report	E. Perea 58'	Stadium: Estadio Carlos González; Referee: Jorge Eduardo Gasso (Mexico)

27 March 2005 2006 World Cup qualification R4	Mexico	2–1	United States	Mexico City, Mexico
	Borgetti 30'; Sinha 33'	Report	Lewis 58'	Stadium: Estadio Azteca; Attendance: 110,000; Referee: Rodolfo Sibrian (El Salvador)

30 March 2005 2006 World Cup qualification R4	Panama	1–1	Mexico	Panama City, Panama
	Tejada 75'	Report	Morales 26'	Stadium: Estadio Rommel Fernández; Attendance: 13,000; Referee: Jose Pineda (Honduras)

27 April 2005 Friendly	Mexico	1–1	Poland	Chicago, United States
18:30 UTC-5	Morales 51'	Report	Brożek 71'	Stadium: Soldier Field; Attendance: 54,427; Referee: Michael Kennedy (United States)

4 June 2005 2006 World Cup qualification R4	Guatemala	0–2	Mexico	Guatemala City, Guatemala
		Report	Sinha 41'; Cabrera 45' (o.g.)	Stadium: Estadio Mateo Flores; Attendance: 26,723; Referee: Brian Hall (United States)

8 June 2005 2006 World Cup qualification R4	Mexico	2–0	Trinidad and Tobago	San Nicolás de los Garza, Mexico
	Borgetti 63'; Pérez 88'	Report		Stadium: Estadio Universitario; Attendance: 32,833; Referee: Kevin Stott (United States)

16 June 2005 2005 FIFA Confederations Cup	Japan	1–2	Mexico	Hanover, Germany
18:00	Yanagisawa 12'	Report	Sinha 39'; Fonseca 64'	Stadium: Stadium Hanover; Attendance: 24,036; Referee: Matthew Breeze (Australia)

19 June 2005 2005 FIFA Confederations Cup	Mexico	1–0	Brazil	Hanover, Germany
20:45	Borgetti 59'	Report		Stadium: Stadium Hanover; Attendance: 43,677; Referee: Roberto Rosetti (Italy)

22 June 2005 2005 FIFA Confederations Cup	Greece	0–0	Mexico	Frankfurt, Germany
20:45		Report		Stadium: Waldstadion; Attendance: 31,285; Referee: Carlos Amarilla (Paraguay)

26 June 2005 2005 FIFA Confederations Cup SF	Mexico	1–1 (a.e.t.) (5–6 p)	Argentina	Hanover, Germany
18:00 CEST	Salcido 104'	Report	Figueroa 110'	Stadium: AWD-Arena; Attendance: 40,718; Referee: Roberto Rosetti (Italy)
	Penalties
	Pérez (penalty scored); Pardo (penalty scored); Borgetti (penalty scored); Salcido (penalty scored); Pineda (penalty scored); Osorio (penalty missed)		(penalty scored) Riquelme; (penalty scored) Rodríguez; (penalty scored) Aimar; (penalty scored) Galletti; (penalty scored) Sorín; (penalty scored) Cambiasso

29 June 2005 2005 FIFA Confederations Cup 3rd	Germany	4–3 (a.e.t.)	Mexico	Leipzig, Germany
18:00 CEST	Podolski 37'; Schweinsteiger 41'; Huth 79'; Ballack 97'	Report	Fonseca 40'; Borgetti 58', 85'	Stadium: Zentralstadion; Attendance: 43,335; Referee: Matthew Breeze (Australia)

8 July 2005 2005 CONCACAF Gold Cup	South Africa	2–1	Mexico	Carson, United States
19ː00 PST	Evans 28' van Heerden 41'	Report	Rodríguez 83'	Stadium: The Home Depot Center; Attendance: 27,000; Referee: Rodolfo Sibrian (El Salvador)

10 July 2005 2005 CONCACAF Gold Cup	Mexico	4–0	Guatemala	Los Angeles, United States
12ː00 PST	Borgetti 5', 14'; Galindo 54'; Bravo 65'	Report		Stadium: Los Angeles Memorial Coliseum; Attendance: 30,710; Referee: Óscar Ruiz (Colombia)

13 July 2005 2005 CONCACAF Gold Cup	Mexico	1–0	Jamaica	Houston, United States
21ː00 CST	Medina 19'	Report		Stadium: Reliant Stadium; Attendance: 45,311; Referee: Walter Quesada (Costa Rica)

17 July 2005 2005 CONCACAF Gold Cup QF	Mexico	1–2	Colombia	Houston, United States
15ː00 CST	Pineda 65'	Report	Castrillón 58'; Aguilar 74'	Stadium: Reliant Stadium; Attendance: 60,050; Referee: Rodolfo Sibrian (SLV)

17 August 2005 2006 World Cup qualification R4	Mexico	2–0	Costa Rica	Mexico City, Mexico
	Borgetti 63'; Fonseca 86'	Report		Stadium: Estadio Azteca; Attendance: 27,000; Referee: Jose Pineda (Honduras)

3 September 2005 2006 World Cup qualification R4	United States	2–0	Mexico	Columbus, United States
	Ralston 53'; Beasley 58'	Report		Stadium: Columbus Crew Stadium; Attendance: 24,685; Referee: Carlos Batres (Guatemala)

7 September 2005 2006 World Cup qualification R4	Mexico	5–0	Panama	Mexico City, Mexico
	Pérez 31'; Márquez 54'; Borgetti 59'; Fonseca 75'; Pardo 76'	Report		Stadium: Estadio Azteca; Attendance: 40,000; Referee: Brian Hall (United States)

8 October 2005 2006 World Cup qualification R4	Mexico	5–2	Guatemala	San Luis Potosí, Mexico
	Franco 19'; Fonseca 48', 51', 62', 66'	Report	Ruiz 1'; S. Ponciano 53'	Stadium: Estadio Alfonso Lastras; Attendance: 30,000; Referee: Peter Prendergast (Jamaica)

12 October 2005 2006 World Cup qualification R4	Trinidad and Tobago	2–1	Mexico	Port of Spain, Trinidad and Tobago
	John 43', 69'	Report	Lozano 38'	Stadium: Hasely Crawford Stadium; Attendance: 23,000; Referee: Jose Pineda (Honduras)

26 October 2005 Friendly	Mexico	3–1	Uruguay	Guadalajara, Mexico
	Salcido 16'; Martínez 47' (pen.); Pérez 53'		Abreu 17'	Stadium: Estadio Jalisco; Attendance: 45,000; Referee: Hugo Leon Guajardo (Mexico)

16 November 2005 Friendly	Mexico	0–3	Bulgaria	Houston, United States
		Report	Valkanov 5'; Bojinov 34'; Berbatov 80'	Stadium: Reliant Stadium; Attendance: 35,526; Referee: Brian Hall (United States)

14 December 2005 Friendly	Mexico	2–0	Hungary	Phoenix, United States
20:00 UTC-7	Fonseca 33'; Huiqui 52'	Report		Stadium: Chase Field; Attendance: 32,466; Referee: Ricardo Valenzuela (United States)

=== 2006 ===
25 January 2006 Friendly	Mexico	2–1	Norway	San Francisco, United States
20:00 (UTC-8)	Fonseca 36'; Pérez 87'	Report	Årst 10'	Stadium: Candlestick Park; Attendance: 44,729; Referee: Terry Vaughn (United States)

15 February 2006 Friendly	South Korea	1–0	Mexico	Los Angeles, United States
	Lee Dong-gook 15'			Stadium: Los Angeles Memorial Coliseum; Referee: Ricardo Salazar (United States)

1 March 2006 Friendly	Mexico	1–0	Ghana	Frisco, United States
	Franco 75'			Stadium: Pizza Hut Park; Attendance: 19,513; Referee: Brian Hall (United States)

29 March 2006 Friendly	Mexico	2–1	Paraguay	Chicago, United States
	Bravo 30', 81' (pen.)			Stadium: Soldier Field; Attendance: 46,510; Referee: Michael Kennedy (United States)

5 May 2006 Friendly	Mexico	1–0	Venezuela	Pasadena, United States
	Bravo 57' (pen.)			Stadium: Rose Bowl; Attendance: 58,147; Referee: Terry Vaughn (United States)

12 May 2006 Friendly	Mexico	2–1	DR Congo	Mexico City, Mexico
	Fonesca 3', 40'		Mbokani 50'	Stadium: Estadio Azteca; Attendance: 75,000; Referee: Jorge Eduardo Gasso Flores (Mexico)

27 May 2006 Friendly	France	1–0	Mexico	Saint-Denis, France
	Malouda 44'	Report		Stadium: Stade de France; Attendance: 78,819; Referee: Mourad Daami (Tunisia)

1 June 2006 Friendly	Netherlands	2–1	Mexico	Eindhoven, Netherlands
	Heitinga 52'; Babel 57'	Report	Borgetti 19'	Stadium: Philips Stadion; Attendance: 30,000; Referee: Fröjdfeldt (Sweden)

11 June 2006 2006 FIFA World Cup	Mexico	3–1	Iran	Nuremberg, Germany
18:00	Bravo 28', 76'; Sinha 79'	Report	Golmohammadi 36'	Stadium: Frankenstadion; Attendance: 41,000; Referee: Roberto Rosetti (Italy)

16 June 2006 2006 FIFA World Cup	Mexico	0–0	Angola	Hanover, Germany
21:00		Report		Stadium: FIFA WM Stadion Hannover; Attendance: 43,000; Referee: Shamsul Maidin (Singapore)

21 June 2006 2006 FIFA World Cup	Portugal	2–1	Mexico	Gelsenkirchen, Germany
16:00	Maniche 6'; Simão 24' (pen.)	Report	Fonseca 29'	Stadium: FIFA WM Stadion Gelsenkirchen; Attendance: 52,000; Referee: Ľuboš Micheľ (Slovakia)

24 June 2006 2006 FIFA World Cup R16	Argentina	2–1 (a.e.t.)	Mexico	Leipzig, Germany
21:00 CET (UTC+1)	Crespo 10'; Rodríguez 98'	Report	Márquez 6'	Stadium: Zentralstadion, Attendance: 43,000; Referee: Massimo Busacca (Switzerland)

=== 2007 ===
7 February 2007 Friendly	United States	2–0	Mexico	Glendale, United States
19:25 UTC−07	Conrad 52'; Donovan 90+1'			Stadium: University of Phoenix Stadium; Attendance: 62,462; Referee: Mauricio Navarro (Canada)

28 February 2007 Friendly	Mexico	3–1	Venezuela	San Diego, United States
	Guardado 25'; Donovan 34'; Blanco 47' (pen.)		Arismendi 83'	Stadium: Qualcomm Stadium; Attendance: 63,328; Referee: Kevin Stott (United States)

25 March 2007 Friendly	Mexico	2–1	Paraguay	San Nicolás de los Garza, Mexico
	Borgetti 77', 81'		Santa Cruz 89'	Stadium: Estadio Universitario; Referee: José Pineda (Honduras)

28 March 2007 Friendly	Mexico	4–2	Ecuador	Oakland, United States
	Palencia 29'; Márquez 72'; Bravo 83'; Bautista 87'		Tenorio 44'; Espinoza 57'	Stadium: McAfee Coliseum; Attendance: 47,416; Referee: Baldomero Toledo (United States)

2 June 2007 Friendly	Mexico	4–0	Iran	San Luis Potosí, Mexico
20:00	Borgetti 2'; Lozano 27'; Fonseca 80'; Torrado 85'	Report		Stadium: Estadio Alfonso Lastras; Attendance: 30,000; Referee: Roberto Silvera (Uruguay)

5 June 2007 Friendly	Mexico	0–1	Paraguay	Mexico City, Mexico
			Cardozo 88'	Stadium: Estadio Azteca; Referee: Jorge Larrionda (Uruguay)

8 June 2007 2007 CONCACAF Gold Cup	Mexico	2–1	Cuba	East Rutherford, United States
21:00 UTC−4	Borgetti 38'; Castillo 56'	Report	Alcántara 23'	Stadium: Giants Stadium; Attendance: 20,230; Referee: Joel Aguilar (El Salvador)

10 June 2007 2007 CONCACAF Gold Cup	Honduras	2–1	Mexico	East Rutherford, United States
16:00 UTC−4	Costly 57', 90'	Report	Blanco 29' (pen.)	Stadium: Giants Stadium; Attendance: 68,123; Referee: Wálter Quesada (Costa Rica)

13 June 2007 2007 CONCACAF Gold Cup	Mexico	1–0	Panama	Houston, United States
21:00 UTC−5	Salcido 60'	Report		Stadium: Reliant Stadium; Attendance: 68,417; Referee: Carlos Batres (Guatemala)

17 June 2007 2007 CONCACAF Gold Cup QF	Mexico	1–0 (a.e.t.)	Costa Rica	Houston, United States
14:00 UTC−5	Borgetti 97'	Report		Stadium: Reliant Stadium; Attendance: 70,092; Referee: Terry Vaughn (United States)

21 June 2007 2007 CONCACAF Gold Cup SF	Mexico	1–0	Guadeloupe	Chicago, United States
21:00 UTC−5	Pardo 70'	Report		Stadium: Soldier Field; Attendance: 50,760; Referee: Roberto Moreno (Panama)

24 June 2007 2007 CONCACAF Gold Cup F	United States	2–1	Mexico	Chicago, United States
14:00 UTC−5	Donovan 62' (pen.); Feilhaber 73'	Report	Guardado 44'	Stadium: Soldier Field; Attendance: 60,000; Referee: Carlos Batres (Guatemala)

27 June 2007 2007 Copa América	Brazil	0–2	Mexico	Ciudad Guayana, Venezuela
20:50		(Report)	Castillo 23'; Morales 28'	Stadium: Polideportivo Cachamay; Attendance: 40,000; Referee: Sergio Pezzotta (Argentina)

1 July 2007 2007 Copa América	Mexico	2–1	Ecuador	Maturín, Venezuela
18:20	Castillo 21'; Bravo 79'	(Report)	Méndez 84'	Stadium: Estadio Monumental de Maturín; Attendance: 52,000; Referee: René Ortube (Bolivia)

4 July 2007 2007 Copa América	Mexico	0–0	Chile	Puerto La Cruz, Venezuela
18:35		(Report)		Stadium: Estadio Olímpico Luis Ramos; Attendance: 38,000; Referee: Carlos Amarilla (Paraguay)

8 July 2007 2007 Copa América QF	Mexico	6–0	Paraguay	Maturín, Venezuela
16:05	Castillo 5' (pen.), 38'; Torrado 27'; Arce 79'; Blanco 87' (pen.); Bravo 90+1'	(Report)		Stadium: Estadio Monumental de Maturín; Attendance: 52,000; Referee: Sergio Pezzotta (Argentina)

11 July 2007 2007 Copa América SF	Mexico	0–3	Argentina	Ciudad Guayana, Venezuela
20:50		(Report)	Heinze 45'; Messi 61'; Riquelme 65' (pen.)	Stadium: Polideportivo Cachamay; Attendance: 41,600; Referee: Carlos Chandía (Chile)

14 July 2007 2007 Copa América 3rd	Uruguay	1–3	Mexico	Caracas, Venezuela
17:05	Abreu 22'	(Report)	Blanco 36' (pen.); Bravo 68'; Guardado 76'	Stadium: Estadio Olímpico; Attendance: 25,000; Referee: Mauricio Reinoso (Ecuador)

22 August 2007 Friendly	Mexico	0–1	Colombia	Commerce City, United States
21:00		Report	Castrillón 51'	Stadium: Dick's Sporting Goods Park; Attendance: 17,737; Referee: Kevin Stott (United States)

09 September 2007 Friendly	Mexico	1–0	Panama	Puebla, Mexico
	Baloy 33' (o.g.)			Stadium: Estadio Cuauhtémoc; Referee: Alex Prus (United States)

12 September 2007 Friendly	Brazil	1–3	Mexico	Foxborough, United States
	Kléber 44'; Kaká 79'; Afonso Alves 85'		Cacho 42'	Stadium: Gillette Stadium; Attendance: 67,584; Referee: Baldomero Toledo (United States)

14 October 2007 Friendly	Mexico	2–2	Nigeria	Ciudad Juárez, Mexico
	Cacho 54', 68' (pen.)	Report	Martins 32', 52'	Stadium: Estadio Olímpico Benito Juárez; Attendance: 50,000; Referee: Elmar Rodas (Guatemala)

17 October 2007 Friendly	Mexico	2–3	Guatemala	Los Angeles, United States
	Vela 30'; Villaluz 31'		Gomez 6'; Avila 65', 73'	Stadium: Los Angeles Memorial Coliseum; Attendance: 42,350; Referee: Ricardo Salazar (United States)

=== 2008 ===
6 February 2008 Friendly	United States	2–2	Mexico	Houston, United States
20:25 UTC−05	Onyewu 29'; Altidore 40'		Magallón 35', 47'	Stadium: Reliant Stadium; Attendance: 70,103; Referee: Carlos Batres (Guatemala)

26 March 2008 Friendly	Mexico	2–1	Ghana	London, England
20:00 UTC+0	Salcido 77'; Pardo 86' (pen.)		Essien 55'	Stadium: Craven Cottage; Referee: Rob Styles (England)

16 April 2008 Friendly	Mexico	1–0	China	Seattle, United States
20:00 UTC-7	Villaluz 14'			Stadium: Qwest Field; Referee: Baldomero Toledo (United States)

4 June 2008 Friendly	Mexico	1–4	Argentina	San Diego, United States
20:00 UTC-7	Sinha 62'		Burdisso 11'; Messi 18'; Rodríguez 29'; Agüero 70'	Stadium: Qualcomm Stadium; Referee: Mauricio Navarro (Canada)

8 June 2008 Friendly	Mexico	4–0	Peru	Chicago, United States
19:00 UTC-5	Arce 5', 28'; Guardado 8'; Vela 21'			Stadium: Soldier Field; Referee: Mark Geiger (United States)

15 June 2008 2010 FIFA World Cup qualification R2	Belize	0–2	Mexico	Houston, United States
15:30 UTC-5		Report	Vela 66'; Borgetti 90+2' (pen.)	Stadium: Reliant Stadium (Note: Belize elected to play their home leg in the United States.); Attendance: 50,137; Referee: Javier Santillán (Netherlands Antilles)

21 June 2008 2010 FIFA World Cup qualification R2	Mexico	7–0	Belize	Monterrey, Mexico
21:00 UTC-5	Vela 7'; Guardado 33'; Arce 45+1', 48'; Borgetti 62', 90+4'; Lennen 90+2' (o.g.)	Report		Stadium: Estadio Universitario; Attendance: 42,000; Referee: Silviu Petrescu (Canada)

20 August 2008 2010 FIFA World Cup qualification R3	Mexico	2–1	Honduras	Mexico City, Mexico
20:00 UTC-5	Pardo 73', 75'	Report	De León 36'	Stadium: Estadio Azteca; Attendance: 81,100; Referee: Joel Aguilar (El Salvador)

6 September 2008 2010 FIFA World Cup qualification R3	Mexico	3–0	Jamaica	Mexico City, Mexico
17:00 UTC-5 (Note: The two matches between Jamaica and Mexico had their playing dates reversed due to the Hurricane Gustav.)	Guardado 3'; Arce 33'; Magallón 63'	Report		Stadium: Estadio Azteca; Attendance: 96,000; Referee: Baldomero Toledo (United States)

10 September 2008 2010 FIFA World Cup qualification R3	Mexico	2–1	Canada	Tuxtla Gutiérrez, Mexico
20:00 UTC-5	Bravo 59'; Márquez 73'	Report	Gerba 78'	Stadium: Estadio Víctor Manuel Reyna; Attendance: 26,900; Referee: Neal Brizan (Trinidad and Tobago)

24 September 2008 Friendly	Mexico	0–1	Chile	Los Angeles, United States
20:00 UTC−07			Valenzuela 75' (o.g.)	Stadium: Los Angeles Memorial Coliseum; Referee: Kevin Stott (United States)

11 October 2008 2010 FIFA World Cup qualification R3	Jamaica	1–0	Mexico	Kingston, Jamaica
19:00 UTC-5	Fuller 34'	Report		Stadium: Independence Park; Attendance: 27,000; Referee: Wálter Quesada (Costa Rica)

15 October 2008 2010 FIFA World Cup qualification R3	Canada	2–2	Mexico	Edmonton, Canada
19:00 UTC-6	Gerba 13'; Radzinski 50'	Report	Salcido 35'; Vuoso 64'	Stadium: Commonwealth Stadium; Attendance: 14,145; Referee: Enrico Wijngaarde (Suriname)

12 November 2008 Friendly	Mexico	2–1	Ecuador	Phoenix, United States
20:00 UTC−07	López 50'; Vuoso 90+3'		Mina 8'	Stadium: Chase Field; Referee: Alex Prus (United States)

19 November 2008 2010 FIFA World Cup qualification R3	Honduras	1–0	Mexico	San Pedro Sula, Honduras
19:00 UTC-6	Osorio 52' (o.g.)	Report		Stadium: Estadio Olímpico Metropolitano; Attendance: 45,000; Referee: Carlos Batres (Guatemala)

=== 2009 ===
28 January 2009 Friendly	Mexico	0–1	Sweden	Oakland, United States
19:30 UTC-7			Farnerud 57'	Stadium: McAfee Coliseum; Attendance: 46,550; Referee: Paul Ward (United States)

11 February 2009 2010 FIFA World Cup qualification R4	United States	2–0	Mexico	Columbus, United States
19:00 UTC-5	Bradley 43', 90+2'	Report		Stadium: Columbus Crew Stadium; Attendance: 23,776; Referee: Carlos Batres (Guatemala)

28 March 2009 2010 FIFA World Cup qualification R4	Mexico	2–0	Costa Rica	Mexico City, Mexico
17:00 UTC-6	Bravo 20'; Pardo 52' (pen.)	Report		Stadium: Estadio Azteca; Attendance: 90,000; Referee: Terry Vaughn (United States)

1 April 2009 2010 FIFA World Cup qualification R4	Honduras	3–1	Mexico	San Pedro Sula, Honduras
19:30 UTC-6	Costly 17', 79'; Pavón 43'	Report	Castillo 82' (pen.)	Stadium: Estadio Olímpico Metropolitano; Attendance: 28,000; Referee: Paul Ward (Canada)

6 June 2009 2010 FIFA World Cup qualification R4	El Salvador	2–1	Mexico	San Salvador, El Salvador
19:00 UTC-6	Martínez 11'; Quintanilla 86' (pen.)	Report	Blanco 71' (pen.)	Stadium: Estadio Cuscatlán; Attendance: 33,000; Referee: Wálter Quesada (Costa Rica)

10 June 2009 2010 FIFA World Cup qualification R4	Mexico	2–1	Trinidad and Tobago	Mexico City, Mexico
20:30 UTC-5	Franco 2'; Rojas 48'	Report	Tinto 45+1'	Stadium: Estadio Azteca; Attendance: 92,000; Referee: José Pineda (Honduras)

24 June 2009 Friendly	Mexico	4–0	Venezuela	Atlanta, United States
19:30 UTC-4	Vela 45' dos Santos 48', 50'; Arellano 72'			Stadium: Georgia Dome; Attendance: 51,115; Referee: Terry Vaughn (United States)

28 June 2009 Friendly	Mexico	0–0	Guatemala	San Diego, United States
17:00 UTC-7				Stadium: Qualcomm Stadium; Referee: Mauricio Navarro (Canada)

5 July 2009 2009 CONCACAF Gold Cup	Nicaragua	0–2	Mexico	Oakland, United States
16:00 UTC-7		Report	Noriega 45' (pen.); Barrera 86'	Stadium: Oakland–Alameda County Coliseum; Attendance: 32,500; Referee: Paul Ward (Canada)

9 July 2009 2009 CONCACAF Gold Cup	Mexico	1–1	Panama	Houston, United States
21:00 UTC-5	Sabah 10'	Report	Pérez 29'	Stadium: Reliant Stadium; Attendance: 47,713; Referee: Joel Aguilar (El Salvador)

12 July 2009 2009 CONCACAF Gold Cup	Mexico	2–0	Guadeloupe	Glendale, United States
16:00 UTC-7	Torrado 42'; Sabah 85'	Report		Stadium: University of Phoenix Stadium; Attendance: 23,876; Referee: Neal Brizan (Trinidad and Tobago)

19 July 2009 2009 CONCACAF Gold Cup QF	Mexico	4–0	Haiti	Arlington, United States
18:00 UTC-5	Sabah 23', 63'; Dos Santos 42'; Barrera 83'	Report		Stadium: Cowboys Stadium; Attendance: 85,000; Referee: Courtney Campbell (Jamaica)

23 July 2009 2009 CONCACAF Gold Cup SF	Costa Rica	1–1 (a.e.t.) (3–5 p)	Mexico	Chicago, United States
21:00 UTC-5	Ledezma 90+3'	Report	Franco 88'	Stadium: Soldier Field; Attendance: 55,173; Referee: Roberto Moreno (Panama)
	Penalties
	Saborío (penalty scored); Borges (penalty scored); Ledezma (penalty missed); Oviedo (penalty scored)		(penalty scored) Franco; (penalty scored) Dos Santos; (penalty scored) Torrado; (penalty scored) Juárez; (penalty scored) Vela

26 July 2009 2009 CONCACAF Gold Cup F	United States	0–5	Mexico	East Rutherford, United States
15:00 UTC-4		Report	Torrado 56' (pen.); Dos Santos 62'; Vela 67'; Castro 79'; Franco 90'	Stadium: Giants Stadium; Attendance: 79,156; Referee: Courtney Campbell (Jamaica)

12 August 2009 2010 FIFA World Cup qualification R4	Mexico	2–1	United States	Mexico City, Mexico
15:00 UTC-5	Castro 19'; Sabah 82'	Report	Davies 9'	Stadium: Estadio Azteca; Attendance: 104,499; Referee: Roberto Moreno (Panama)

5 September 2009 2010 FIFA World Cup qualification R4	Costa Rica	0–3	Mexico	San José, Costa Rica
20:00 UTC-6		Report	Dos Santos 45+1'; Franco 62'; Guardado 71'	Stadium: Estadio Ricardo Saprissa Aymá; Attendance: 20,000; Referee: Neal Brizan (Trinidad and Tobago)

9 September 2009 2010 FIFA World Cup qualification R4	Mexico	1–0	Honduras	Mexico City, Mexico
20:00 UTC-5	Blanco 76' (pen.)	Report		Stadium: Estadio Azteca; Attendance: 97,897; Referee: Courtney Campbell (Jamaica)

30 September 2009 Friendly	Mexico	1–2	Colombia	Dallas, United States
00:45 (GMT)	P. Aguilar 90'	Report	G. Moreno 45'; Quintero 80'	Stadium: Cotton Bowl; Referee: Ricardo Salazar (USA)

10 October 2009 2010 FIFA World Cup qualification R4	Mexico	4–1	El Salvador	Mexico City, Mexico
17:00 UTC-5	González 25' (o.g.); Blanco 71'; Palencia 85'; Vela 90'	Report	Martínez 89'	Stadium: Estadio Azteca; Attendance: 104,000; Referee: Carlos Batres (Guatemala)

14 October 2009 2010 FIFA World Cup qualification R4	Trinidad and Tobago	2–2	Mexico	Port of Spain, Trinidad and Tobago
20:05 UTC-4	Baptiste 23' (pen.), 61'	Report	Esqueda 57'; Salcido 65'	Stadium: Hasely Crawford Stadium; Attendance: 2,000; Referee: Wálter Quesada (Costa Rica)

=== 2010 ===
24 February 2010 Friendly	Mexico	5–0	Bolivia	San Francisco, United States
19:00 UTC-7	Barrera 2'; J. Hernández 12', 20'; Luna 18'; Aguilar 52'			Stadium: Candlestick Park; Attendance: 20,000; Referee: Terry Vaughn (United States)

3 March 2010 Friendly	Mexico	2–0	New Zealand	Pasadena, United States
20:00 UTC-8	J. Hernández 53'; Vela 57'			Stadium: Rose Bowl; Attendance: 20,000; Referee: Jair Marrufo (United States)

17 March 2010 Friendly	Mexico	2–1	North Korea	Torreón, Mexico
21:30 UTC-5	Blanco 50'; J. Hernández 68'		Choe Kum-chol 56'	Stadium: Estadio Corona; Referee: Roberto Moreno (Panama)

24 March 2010 Friendly	Mexico	0–0	Iceland	Charlotte, United States
19:00 (UTC-4)		Report		Stadium: Bank of America Stadium; Attendance: 63,227; Referee: Mark Geiger (United States)

7 May 2010 Friendly	Mexico	0–0	Ecuador	East Rutherford, United States
21:00 (UTC-4)				Stadium: New Meadowlands Stadium; Referee: Steve De Piero (Canada)

10 May 2010 Friendly	Mexico	1–0	Senegal	Chicago, United States
20:00 (UTC-5)	Medina 60'			Stadium: Soldier Field; Referee: Ricardo Salazar (United States)

13 May 2010 Friendly	Mexico	1–0	Angola	Houston, United States
20:00 (UTC-5)	Guardado 52'			Stadium: Reliant Stadium; Referee: Baldomero Toledo (United States)

16 May 2010 Friendly	Mexico	1–0	Chile	Mexico City, Mexico
12:00 (UTC-5)	Medina 13'			Stadium: Estadio Azteca; Referee: Mark Geiger (United States)

24 May 2010 Friendly	England	3–1	Mexico	London, England
20:00 UTC+01	King 17'; Crouch 34'; G. Johnson 47'	FA Report	Franco 45+3'	Stadium: Wembley; Attendance: 88,638; Referee: Masaaki Toma (Japan)

26 May 2010 Friendly	Netherlands	2–1	Mexico	Freiburg, Germany
20:00	van Persie 17', 41'		Hernández 74'	Stadium: Badenova-Stadion; Attendance: 20,000; Referee: Manuel Gräfe (Germany)

16 May 2010 Friendly	Mexico	5–1	Gambia	Bayreuth, Germany
15ː00 (UTC+2)	J. Hernández 17', 50', Bautista 58', 73', Medina 80'		Sohna 65'	Stadium: Hans-Walter Wild Stadion; Referee: Felix Brych (Germany)

3 June 2010 Friendly	Italy	1–2	Mexico	Brussels, Belgium
19:15 CEST (UTC+02:00)	Bonucci 89'	Report	Vela 18'; Medina 84'	Stadium: Stade Roi Baudouin; Attendance: 30,000; Referee: Johan Verbist (Belgium)

11 June 2010 2010 FIFA World Cup	South Africa	1–1	Mexico	Johannesburg, South Africa
16:00	Tshabalala 55'	Report	Márquez 79'	Stadium: Soccer City; Attendance: 84,490; Referee: Ravshan Irmatov (Uzbekistan)

17 June 2010 2010 FIFA World Cup	France	0–2	Mexico	Polokwane, South Africa
20:30		Report	Hernández 64'; Blanco 79' (pen.)	Stadium: Peter Mokaba Stadium; Attendance: 35,370; Referee: Khalil Al Ghamdi (Saudi Arabia)

22 June 2010 2010 FIFA World Cup	Mexico	0–1	Uruguay	Rustenburg, South Africa
16:00		Report	Suárez 43'	Stadium: Royal Bafokeng Stadium; Attendance: 33,425; Referee: Viktor Kassai (Hungary)

27 June 2010 2010 FIFA World Cup R16	Argentina	3–1	Mexico	Johannesburg, South Africa
20:30	Tevez 26', 52'; Higuaín 33'	Report	Hernández 71'	Stadium: Soccer City; Attendance: 84,377; Referee: Roberto Rosetti (Italy)

11 August 2010 Friendly	Mexico	1–1	Spain	Mexico City, Mexico
22:00 CEST; 15:00 Local time	Hernández 11'	Report	Silva 90+1'	Stadium: Estadio Azteca; Attendance: 105,000; Referee: (Panama) Roberto Moreno

4 September 2010 Friendly	Mexico	1–2	Ecuador	Zapopan, Mexico
20:00 (UTC-5)	Checa 40' (o.g.)		Benítez 1'; Ayoví 58'	Stadium: Estadio Omnilife; Referee: Wálter Quesada (Costa Rica)

8 September 2010 Friendly	Mexico	1–0	Colombia	San Nicolás de los Garza, Mexico
21:00 (UTC-5)	E. Hernández 88'	Report		Stadium: Estadio Universitario; Referee: José Pineda (Argentina)

12 October 2010 Friendly	Mexico	2–2	Venezuela	Ciudad Juárez, Mexico
20:00 (UTC-6)	J. Hernández 34'; Dos Santos 61'		Arango 6', 40'	Stadium: Estadio Olímpico Benito Juárez; Referee: Joel Aguilar (El Salvador)

=== 2011 ===
9 February 2011 Friendly	Mexico	2–0	Bosnia and Herzegovina	Atlanta, United States
21:00 UTC-4	Pjanić 48' (o.g.); Pacheco 54'	Report		Stadium: Georgia Dome; Attendance: 50,507; Referee: Jair Marrufo (United States)

26 March 2011 Friendly	Mexico	3–1	Paraguay	Oakland, United States
13:00 UTC-7	J. Hernández 7', 34'; Guardado 28'		Riveros 86'	Stadium: Oakland–Alameda County Coliseum; Referee: Paul Ward (Canada)

29 March 2011 Friendly	Mexico	1–1	Venezuela	San Diego, United States
19:00 UTC-7				Stadium: Qualcomm Stadium; Referee: Ricardo Salazar (United States)

28 May 2011 Friendly	Mexico	1–1	Ecuador	Seattle, United States
15:00 UTC-7	Torres Nilo 7'		Arroyo 37'	Stadium: Qwest Field; Referee: Edvin Jurisevic (United States)

1 June 2011 Friendly	Mexico	3–0	New Zealand	Denver, United States
20ː00 UTC-6	Dos Santos 22', 30'; De Nigris 43'			Stadium: Invesco Field at Mile High; Referee: Terry Vaughn (United States)

5 June 2011 2011 CONCACAF Gold Cup	Mexico	5–0	El Salvador	Arlington, United States
20:00 (19:00 UTC−5)	Juárez 55'; De Nigris 58'; J. Hernández 60', 67', 90+5' (pen.)	Report		Stadium: Cowboys Stadium; Attendance: 80,108; Referee: Enrico Wijngaarde (Suriname)

9 June 2011 2011 CONCACAF Gold Cup	Cuba	0–5	Mexico	Charlotte, United States
21:00 (21:00 UTC−4)		Report	J. Hernández 35', 76'; Dos Santos 63', 68'; De Nigris 65'	Stadium: Bank of America Stadium; Attendance: 46,012; Referee: Courtney Campbell (Jamaica)

12 June 2011 2011 CONCACAF Gold Cup	Mexico	4–1	Costa Rica	Chicago, United States
20:00 (19:00 UTC−5)	Márquez 17'; Guardado 19', 26'; Barrera 38'	Report	Ureña 69'	Stadium: Soldier Field; Attendance: 62,000; Referee: Roberto Moreno (Panama)

18 June 2011 2011 CONCACAF Gold Cup QF	Mexico	2–1	Guatemala	East Rutherford, United States
20:00 (20:00 UTC−4)	de Nigris 48'; J. Hernández 66'	Report	Ruiz 5'	Stadium: New Meadowlands Stadium; Attendance: 78,807; Referee: Courtney Campbell (Jamaica)

22 June 2011 2011 CONCACAF Gold Cup SF	Honduras	0–2	Mexico	Houston, United States
22:00 (21:00 UTC−5)		Report	de Nigris 93'; Hernández 99'	Stadium: Reliant Stadium; Attendance: 70,627; Referee: Walter López (Guatemala)

25 June 2011 2011 CONCACAF Gold Cup F	United States	2–4	Mexico	Pasadena, United States
21:00 (18:00 UTC−7)	Bradley 8'; Donovan 23'	Report	Barrera 28', 49'; Guardado 35' dos Santos 76'	Stadium: Rose Bowl; Attendance: 93,420; Referee: Joel Aguilar (El Salvador)

4 July 2011 2011 Copa América	Chile	2–1	Mexico	San Juan, Argentina
21:45	Paredes 66'; Vidal 72'	Report	Araújo 40'	Stadium: Estadio del Bicentenario; Referee: Juan Soto (Venezuela)

8 July 2011 2011 Copa América	Peru	1–0	Mexico	Mendoza, Argentina
21:45	Guerrero 82'	Report		Stadium: Estadio Malvinas Argentinas, Mendoza; Referee: Sergio Pezzotta (Argentina)

12 July 2011 2011 Copa América	Uruguay	1–0	Mexico	La Plata, Argentina
21:45	Á. Pereira 14'	Report		Stadium: Estadio Ciudad de La Plata; Referee: Raúl Orosco (Bolivia)

10 August 2011 Friendly	United States	1–1	Mexico	Philadelphia, United States
21:00 UTC−05	Rogers 73'		Peralta 17'	Stadium: Lincoln Financial Field; Attendance: 30,138; Referee: Raymond Bogle (Jamaica)

2 September 2011 Friendly	Poland	1–1	Mexico	Warsaw, Poland
20:30	Brożek 27'	Report	J. Hernandez 34'	Stadium: Pepsi Arena; Attendance: 18,000; Referee: Alexandru Deaconu (Romania)

4 September 2011 Friendly	Mexico	1–0	Chile	Barcelona, Spain
14ː00	Guardado 78'			Stadium: Estadi Cornellà-El Prat; Referee: C. Fernández (Spain)

11 October 2011 Friendly	Mexico	1–2	Brazil	Torreón, Mexico
20ː30	David Luiz 10' (o.g.)		Ronaldinho 79' Marcelo 84'	Stadium: Estadio Corona; Referee: Marlon Mejia (El Salvador)

11 November 2011 Friendly	Mexico	2–0	Serbia	Querétaro, Mexico
20ː10	Salcido 3'; Hernández 88' (pen.)	Report		Stadium: Estadio Corregidora; Attendance: 34,000; Referee: Walter Lopez (Guatemala)

=== 2012 ===
25 January 2012 Friendly	Mexico	3–1	Venezuela	Houston, United States
20:00 UTC−5	Salcido 68'; Márquez Lugo 88'; Peralta 89'		Greco 51'	Stadium: Reliant Stadium; Referee: Edvin Jurisevic (United States)

29 February 2012 Friendly	Mexico	0–2	Colombia	Miami Gardens, United States
16:00 UTC−4		Report	Falcao 36'; Cuadrado 60'	Stadium: Sun Life Stadium; Attendance: 42,000; Referee: Terry Vaughn (USA)

27 May 2012 Friendly	Mexico	2–0	Wales	East Rutherford, United States
20:00	De Nigris 43', 89'	Report		Stadium: MetLife Stadium; Attendance: 35,518; Referee: Ricardo Salazar (USA)

31 May 2012 Friendly	Mexico	2–1	Bosnia and Herzegovina	Chicago, United States
20:00 UTC-5	G. Dos Santos 6'; Hernández 90+2'	Report	Džeko 29'	Stadium: Soldier Field; Attendance: 51,240; Referee: Edvin Jurisevic (United States)

31 May 2012 Friendly	Mexico	2–1	Brazil	Arlington, United States
14:00 UTC-5	Dos Santos 21'; J. Hernández 32'	Report		Stadium: Cowboys Stadium; Referee: S. Petrescu (Canada)

8 June 2012 2014 FIFA World Cup qualification R3	Mexico	3–1	Guyana	Mexico City, Mexico
19:00 UTC−5	Salcido 10'; Dos Santos 15'; Rodrigues 51' (o.g.)	Report	Moreno 62' (o.g.)	Stadium: Estadio Azteca; Attendance: 80,401; Referee: Javier Santos (Puerto Rico)

12 June 2012 2014 FIFA World Cup qualification R3	El Salvador	1–2	Mexico	San Salvador, El Salvador
19:33 UTC−6	Pacheco 64'	Report	Zavala 60'; Moreno 82'	Stadium: Estadio Cuscatlán; Attendance: 29,712; Referee: José Pineda (Honduras)

15 August 2012 Friendly	Mexico	0–1	United States	Mexico City, Mexico
19:00 UTC−05			Orozco 80'	Stadium: Estadio Azteca; Attendance: 56,000; Referee: Wálter Quesada (Costa Rica)

7 September 2012 2014 FIFA World Cup qualification R3	Costa Rica	0–2	Mexico	San José, Costa Rica
20:05 UTC−6		Report	Salcido 44'; Zavala 52'	Stadium: Estadio Nacional de Costa Rica; Attendance: 32,500; Referee: Roberto Moreno (Panama)

11 September 2012 2014 FIFA World Cup qualification R3	Mexico	1–0	Costa Rica	Mexico City, Mexico
20:00 UTC−5	J. Hernández 61'	Report		Stadium: Estadio Azteca; Attendance: 44,007; Referee: Courtney Campbell (Jamaica)

12 October 2012 2014 FIFA World Cup qualification R3	Guyana	0–5	Mexico	Houston, United States
20:00 UTC−5		Report	Guardado 78'; Peralta 79'; Pollard 82' (o.g.); J. Hernández 84'; Reyna 86'	Stadium: BBVA Compass Stadium (Note: Guyana played its home World Cup qualifier against Mexico at BBVA Compass Stadium, Houston, citing a conflict with the originally announced venue of Providence Stadium, Providence.); Attendance: 12,115; Referee: Walter López (Guatemala)

16 October 2012 2014 FIFA World Cup qualification R3	Mexico	2–0	El Salvador	Torreón, Mexico
20:00 UTC−5	Peralta 64'; J. Hernández 85'	Report		Stadium: Estadio Corona; Attendance: 26,333; Referee: Jafeth Perea (Panama)

=== 2013 ===
25 January 2012 Friendly	Mexico	1–1	Denmark	Glendale, United States
21:00 UTC−7	Fabián 67' (pen.)		Cornelius 83' (pen.)	Stadium: University of Phoenix Stadium; Referee: Chris Penso (United States)

6 February 2013 2014 FIFA World Cup qualification R4	Mexico	0–0	Jamaica	Mexico City, Mexico
20:30 UTC−6		Report		Stadium: Estadio Azteca; Attendance: 43,002; Referee: Mark Geiger (United States)

22 March 2013 2014 FIFA World Cup qualification R4	Honduras	2–2	Mexico	San Pedro Sula, Houndras
15:05 UTC−6	Costly 77'; Bengtson 80'	Report	Hernández 28', 54'	Stadium: Estadio Olímpico Metropolitano; Attendance: 38,500; Referee: Courtney Campbell (Jamaica)

26 March 2013 2014 FIFA World Cup qualification R4	Mexico	0–0	United States	Mexico City, Mexico
20:30 UTC−6		Report		Stadium: Estadio Azteca; Attendance: 85,500; Referee: Walter López (Guatemala)

17 April 2013 Friendly	Mexico	0–0	Peru	San Francisco, United States
				Stadium: Candlestick Park; Referee: Ricardo Salazar (United States)

31 May 2013 Friendly	Mexico	2–2	Nigeria	Houston, United States
	Hernández 21', 70'	Report	Ideye 27' (pen.); Ugochukwu 40'	Stadium: Reliant Stadium; Attendance: 62,000; Referee: Baldomero Toledo (United States)

4 June 2013 (Note: The fixture Jamaica v Mexico on 18 June was moved to 4 June to allow Mexico to participate in the 2013 FIFA Confederations Cup.) 2014 FIFA World Cup qualification R4	Jamaica	0–1	Mexico	Kingston, Jamaica
20:35 UTC−5		Report	De Nigris 48'	Stadium: Independence Park; Attendance: 16,483; Referee: Joel Aguilar (El Salvador)

7 June 2013 2014 FIFA World Cup qualification R4	Panama	0–0	Mexico	Panama City, Panama
21:05 UTC−5		Report		Stadium: Estadio Rommel Fernández; Attendance: 27,100; Referee: Wálter Quesada (Costa Rica)

11 June 2013 2014 FIFA World Cup qualification R4	Mexico	0–0	Costa Rica	Mexico City, Mexico
19:00 UTC−5		Report		Stadium: Estadio Azteca; Attendance: 65,753; Referee: Mark Geiger (United States)

16 June 2013 2013 FIFA Confederations Cup	Mexico	1–2	Italy	Rio de Janeiro, Brazil
16:00	Hernández 34' (pen.)	Report	Pirlo 27'; Balotelli 78'	Stadium: Estádio do Maracanã; Attendance: 73,123; Referee: Enrique Osses (Chile)

19 June 2013 2013 FIFA Confederations Cup	Brazil	2–0	Mexico	Fortaleza, Brazil
16:00	Neymar 9'; Jô 90+3'	Report		Stadium: Estádio Castelão; Attendance: 57,804; Referee: Howard Webb (England)

22 June 2013 2013 FIFA Confederations Cup	Japan	1–2	Mexico	Belo Horizonte, Brazil
16:00	Okazaki 86'	Report	Hernández 54', 66'	Stadium: Estádio Mineirão; Attendance: 52,690; Referee: Felix Brych (Germany)

7 July 2013 2013 CONCACAF Gold Cup	Mexico	1–2	Panama	Pasadena, United States
20:00	Fabián 45+2'	Report	G. Torres 7' (pen.), 48'	Stadium: Rose Bowl; Attendance: 56,822; Referee: Wálter Quesada (Costa Rica)

11 July 2013 2013 CONCACAF Gold Cup	Mexico	2–0	Canada	Seattle, United States
23:00	R. Jiménez 42'; Fabián 57' (pen.)	Report		Stadium: CenturyLink Field; Attendance: 28,354; Referee: Joel Aguilar (El Salvador)

14 July 2013 2013 CONCACAF Gold Cup	Martinique	1–3	Mexico	Denver, United States
18:00	Parsemain 43' (pen.)	Report	Fabián 21'; Montes 34'; Ponce 90'	Stadium: Sports Authority Field; Attendance: 30,000; Referee: Mark Geiger (United States)

20 July 2013 2013 CONCACAF Gold Cup QF	Mexico	1–0	Trinidad and Tobago	Atlanta, United States
18:30	R. Jiménez 84'	Report		Stadium: Georgia Dome; Attendance: 54,229; Referee: Joel Aguilar (El Salvador)

24 July 2013 2013 CONCACAF Gold Cup SF	Panama	2–1	Mexico	Arlington, United States
22:00	B. Pérez 13'; R. Torres 61'	Report	Montes 26'	Stadium: Cowboys Stadium; Attendance: 81,410; Referee: Courtney Campbell (Jamaica)

14 August 2013 Friendly	Mexico	4–1	Ivory Coast	East Rutherford, United States
20:30 UTC−4	Boka 10' (o.g.); Peralta 28', 45'; Reyna 90'		Drogba 62'	Stadium: MetLife Stadium; Referee: David Gantar (Canada)

6 September 2013 2014 FIFA World Cup qualification R4	Mexico	1–2	Honduras	Mexico City, Mexico
20:30 UTC−5	Peralta 6'	Report	Bengtson 63'; Costly 66'	Stadium: Estadio Azteca; Attendance: 73,981; Referee: Roberto Moreno (Panama)

10 September 2013 2014 FIFA World Cup qualification R4	United States	2–0	Mexico	Columbus, United States
20:06 UTC−5	E. Johnson 49'; Donovan 78'	Report		Stadium: Columbus Crew Stadium; Attendance: 24,584; Referee: Courtney Campbell (Jamaica)

11 October 2013 2014 FIFA World Cup qualification R4	Mexico	2–1	Panama	Mexico City, Mexico
20:30 UTC−5	Peralta 39'; Jiménez 85'	Report	Tejada 81'	Stadium: Estadio Azteca; Attendance: 90,758; Referee: Joel Aguilar (El Salvador)

15 October 2013 2014 FIFA World Cup qualification R4	Costa Rica	2–1	Mexico	San José, Costa Rica
19:30 UTC−6	Ruiz 24'; Saborío 63'	Report	Peralta 28'	Stadium: Estadio Nacional de Costa Rica; Attendance: 35,000; Referee: Walter López (Guatemala)

30 October 2013 Friendly	Mexico	4–2	Finland	San Diego, United States
	Márquez 11'; Peña 23'; Peralta 46'; Escoboza 64'		Hurme 28'; Valenzuela 55' (o.g.)	Stadium: Qualcomm Stadium; Referee: Edvin Jurisevic (United States)

13 November 2013 2014 FIFA World Cup qualification	Mexico	5–1	New Zealand	Mexico City, Mexico
14:30 UTC−6	Aguilar 32'; Jiménez 40'; Peralta 48', 80'; Márquez 84'	Report	James 85'	Stadium: Estadio Azteca; Attendance: 99,832; Referee: Viktor Kassai (Hungary)

20 November 2013 2014 FIFA World Cup qualification	New Zealand	2–4	Mexico	Wellington, New Zealand
19:00 UTC+13	James 80' (pen.); Fallon 83'	Report	Peralta 14', 29', 33'; Peña 87'	Stadium: Westpac Stadium; Attendance: 35,206; Referee: Felix Brych (Germany)

=== 2014 ===
29 January 2014 Friendly	South Korea	0–4	Mexico	San Antonio, United States
20:00		Report	Peralta 37'; Pulido 45+1', 86', 89'	Stadium: Alamodome; Attendance: 54,313; Referee: Héctor Rodríguez (Honduras)

5 March 2014 Friendly	Mexico	0–0	Nigeria	Atlanta, United States
20:30 UTC−4		Report		Stadium: Georgia Dome; Attendance: 68,212; Referee: Wálter Quesada (Costa Rica)

2 April 2014 Friendly	United States	2–2	Mexico	Glendale, United States
20:00 MT	Bradley 15'; Wondolowski 28'	Report	Márquez 49'; Pulido 67'	Stadium: University of Phoenix Stadium; Attendance: 59,066; Referee: Roberto Moreno (Panama)

28 May 2014 Friendly	Mexico	3–0	Israel	Mexico City, Mexico
21:30 UTC-5	Layún 43', 62'; Fabián 85'	Report		Stadium: Estadio Azteca; Attendance: 80,000; Referee: Elmer Bonilla (El Salvador)

31 May 2014 Friendly	Mexico	3–1	Ecuador	Arlington, United States
14:00 UTC−5	Montes 33' Fabián 69' Banguera 76' (o.g.)	Report	Valencia 80'	Stadium: Cowboys Stadium; Referee: John Pitti (Panama)

3 June 2014 Friendly	Mexico	0–1	Bosnia and Herzegovina	Chicago, United States
20:30 UTC-5		Report	Hajrović 41'	Stadium: Soldier Field; Attendance: 51,240; Referee: Óscar Reyna (Guatemala)

6 June 2014 Friendly	Mexico	0–1	Portugal	Foxborough, United States
20:30 EDT			Alves 90+3'	Stadium: Gillette Stadium; Attendance: 60,000; Referee: Jeffrey Solis (Costa Rica)

13 June 2014 2014 FIFA World Cup	Mexico	1–0	Cameroon	Natal, Brazil
13:00 UTC−3	Peralta 61'	Report		Stadium: Arena das Dunas; Attendance: 39,216; Referee: Wilmar Roldán (Colombia)

17 June 2014 2014 FIFA World Cup	Brazil	0–0	Mexico	Fortaleza, Brazil
16:00 UTC−3		Report		Stadium: Estádio Castelão; Attendance: 60,342; Referee: Cüneyt Çakır (Turkey)

23 June 2014 2014 FIFA World Cup	Croatia	1–3	Mexico	Recife, Brazil
17:00 UTC−3	Perišić 87'	Report	Márquez 72'; Guardado 75'; Hernández 82'	Stadium: Itaipava Arena Pernambuco; Attendance: 41,212; Referee: Ravshan Irmatov (Uzbekistan)

29 June 2014 2014 FIFA World Cup R16	Netherlands	2–1	Mexico	Fortaleza, Brazil
13:00	Sneijder 88'; Huntelaar 90+4' (pen.)	Report	Dos Santos 48'	Stadium: Estádio Castelão; Attendance: 58,817; Referee: Pedro Proença (Portugal)

6 September 2014 Friendly	Mexico	0–0	Chile	Santa Clara, United States
		Report		Stadium: Levi's Stadium; Referee: Juan Guzmán (United States)

9 September 2014 Friendly	Mexico	1–0	Bolivia	Commerce City, United States
	Layún 18'	Report		Stadium: Dick's Sporting Goods Park; Referee: Chris Penso (United States)

9 October 2014 Friendly	Mexico	2–0	Honduras	Tuxtla Gutiérrez, Mexico
19:00 CST	Hernández 20'; Alanís 37'			Stadium: Estadio Víctor Manuel Reyna; Attendance: 28,000; Referee: Wálter Quesada (Costa Rica)

12 October 2014 Friendly	Mexico	1–0	Panama	Querétaro, Mexico
	Torres 89'			Stadium: Estadio Corregidora; Referee: Joel Aguilar (El Salvador

12 November 2014 Friendly	Netherlands	2–3	Mexico	Amsterdam, Netherlands
20:30 (UTC+1)	Sneijder 49'; Blind 74'	Report	Vela 8', 62'; J. Hernandez 69'	Stadium: Amsterdam Arena; Referee: Szymon Marciniak (Poland)

18 November 2014 Friendly	Belarus	3–2	Mexico	Barysaw, Belarus
20:00 (UTC+3)	Kislyak 50'; Signevich 55'; Nyakhaychyk 81'	Report	R. Jiménez 48', 53'	Stadium: Borisov Arena; Attendance: 6,700; Referee: Ivanov Sergey (Russia)

=== 2015 ===
28 March 2015 Friendly	Mexico	1–0	Ecuador	Los Angeles, United States
18:30		Report	J. Hernández 14'	Stadium: Los Angeles Memorial Coliseum; Referee: Christopher Reid (Belize)

31 March 2015 Friendly	Mexico	1–0	Paraguay	Kansas City, United States
18:00		Report	Herrera 3'	Stadium: Arrowhead Stadium; Referee: Walter López (Guatemala)

15 April 2015 Friendly	United States	2–0	Mexico	San Antonio, United States
19:30 CT	Morris 49'; Agudelo 72'	Report		Stadium: Alamodome; Attendance: 64,369; Referee: Ricardo Montero (Costa Rica)

30 May 2015 Friendly	Mexico	3–0	Guatemala	Tuxtla Gutiérrez, Mexico
15ː00	Herrera 30', 63'; Corona 74'	Report		Stadium: Estadio Víctor Manuel Reyna; Referee: Baldomero Toledo (United States)

3 June 2015 Friendly	Peru	1–1	Mexico	Lima, Peru
18ː00	Farfán 62'	Report	Valenzuela 75'	Stadium: Estadio Nacional de Lima; Referee: Omar Ponce (Ecuador)

7 June 2015 Friendly	Brazil	2–0	Mexico	São Paulo, Brazil
18ː00	Coutinho 28'; Tardelli 37'	Report		Stadium: Allianz Parque; Referee: Julio Quintana (Paraguay)

12 June 2015 2015 Copa América	Mexico	0–0	Bolivia	Viña del Mar, Chile
20:30		Report		Stadium: Estadio Sausalito; Attendance: 14,987; Referee: Enrique Cáceres (Paraguay)

15 June 2015 2015 Copa América	Chile	3–3	Mexico	Santiago, Chile
20:30	Vidal 21', 54' (pen.); Vargas 41'	Report	Vuoso 20', 65'; Jiménez 28'	Stadium: Estadio Nacional; Attendance: 45,583; Referee: Víctor Hugo Carrillo (Peru)

19 June 2015 2015 Copa América	Mexico	1–2	Ecuador	Rancagua, Chile
18:00	Jiménez 63' (pen.)	Report	Bolaños 25'; Valencia 57'	Stadium: Estadio El Teniente; Attendance: 11,051; Referee: José Argote (Venezuela)

27 June 2015 Friendly	Mexico	2–2	Costa Rica	Orlando, United States
18:00 (UTC−4)	G. Dos Santos 53'; Hernández 55'		4' Ramírez; 36' (o.g.) Layún	Stadium: Orlando Citrus Bowl; Attendance: 53,629; Referee: Edvin Jurisevic (United States)

1 July 2015 Friendly	Mexico	0–0	Honduras	Houston, United States
20:30 CST				Stadium: NRG Stadium; Attendance: 70,128; Referee: Armando Villarreal (USA)

9 July 2015 2015 CONCACAF Gold Cup	Mexico	6–0	Cuba	Chicago, United States
21:30 (20:30 CDT)	Peralta 17', 37', 62'; Vela 23'; Guardado 44'; G. dos Santos 75'	Report		Stadium: Soldier Field; Attendance: 54,126; Referee: Wálter Quesada (Costa Rica)

12 July 2015 2015 CONCACAF Gold Cup	Guatemala	0–0	Mexico	Glendale, United States
19:00 MST		Report		Stadium: University of Phoenix Stadium; Attendance: 62,910; Referee: Armando Castro (Honduras)

15 July 2015 2015 CONCACAF Gold Cup	Mexico	4–4	Trinidad and Tobago	Charlotte, United States
20:30	Aguilar 32'; Vela 51'; Guardado 88'; K. Jones 90+1' (o.g.)	Report	Cummings 55', 67'; K. Jones 58'; Marshall 90+3'	Stadium: Bank of America Stadium; Attendance: 55,823; Referee: Mark Geiger (United States)

19 July 2015 2015 CONCACAF Gold Cup QF	Mexico	1–0	Costa Rica	East Rutherford, United States
19:30 (UTC−4)	Guardado 120+4' (pen.)			Stadium: MetLife Stadium; Attendance: 74,187; Referee: Walter López (Guatemala)

22 July 2015 2015 CONCACAF Gold Cup SF	Panama	1–2	Mexico	Atlanta, United States
21:00	R. Torres 57'	Report	Guardado 90+10' (pen.), 105+1' (pen.)	Stadium: Georgia Dome; Attendance: 70,511; Referee: Mark Geiger (United States)

26 July 2015 2015 CONCACAF Gold Cup F	Jamaica	1–3	Mexico	Philadelphia, United States
20:00 EDT (UTC−4)	Mattocks 79'	Report	Guardado 31'; Corona 46'; Peralta 61'	Stadium: Lincoln Financial Field; Attendance: 68,930; Referee: Joel Aguilar (El Salvador)

4 September 2015 Friendly	Mexico	3–3	Trinidad and Tobago	Sandy, United States
19:00	Esquivel 41'; Jiménez 56'; Herrera 85'	Report	Glenn 7'; Cummings 39'; Jones 69'	Stadium: Rio Tinto Stadium; Referee: Adrian Skeete (Barbados)

8 September 2015 Friendly	Mexico	2–2	Argentina	Arlington, United States
19:30	J. Hernández 19'; Herrera 70'	Report	Agüero 85'; Messi 89'	Stadium: AT&T Stadium; Referee: Ricardo Salazar (United States)

10 October 2015 2015 CONCACAF Cup	United States	2–3 (a.e.t.)	Mexico	Pasadena, United States
20:30 ET	Cameron 15'; Wood 108'	Report	Hernández 10'; Peralta 96'; Aguilar 118'	Stadium: Rose Bowl; Attendance: 93,723; Referee: Joel Aguilar (El Salvador)

13 October 2015 Friendly	Mexico	1–0	Panama	Toluca, Mexico
19:00	Vela 45'	Report		Stadium: Estadio Nemesio Díez; Referee: Óscar Moncada (Honduras)

13 November 2015 2018 FIFA World Cup qualification R4	Mexico	3–0	El Salvador	Mexico City, Mexico
20:00 UTC−6	Guardado 7'; Herrera 42'; Vela 64'	Report (FIFA); Report (CONCACAF)		Stadium: Estadio Azteca; Attendance: 57,623; Referee: Walter López Castellanos (Guatemala)

17 November 2015 2018 FIFA World Cup qualification R4	Honduras	0–2	Mexico	San Pedro Sula, Honduras
15:00 UTC−6		Report (FIFA); Report (CONCACAF)	Corona 67'; Damm 72'	Stadium: Estadio Olímpico Metropolitano; Attendance: 35,209; Referee: John Pitti (Panama)

=== 2016 ===
10 February 2016 Friendly	Mexico	2–0	Senegal	Miami, United States
	Dueñas 73'; Pizarro 87'			Stadium: Marlins Park; Referee: Jair Marrufo (United States)

25 March 2016 2018 FIFA World Cup qualification R4	Canada	0–3	Mexico	Vancouver, Canada
19:08 UTC−7		Report (FIFA); Report (CONCACAF)	Hernández 32'; Lozano 40'; Corona 72'	Stadium: BC Place; Attendance: 54,798; Referee: Kimbell Ward (Saint Kitts and Nevis)

29 March 2016 2018 FIFA World Cup qualification R4	Mexico	2–0	Canada	Mexico City, Mexico
20:30 UTC−6	Guardado 17' (pen.); Corona 45+3'	Report (FIFA); Report (CONCACAF)		Stadium: Estadio Azteca; Attendance: 64,430; Referee: Yadel Martínez (Cuba)

28 May 2016 Friendly	Mexico	1–0	Paraguay	Atlanta, United States
14ː30	Guardado 32'	Report		Stadium: Georgia Dome; Referee: Edvin Jurisevic (United States)

1 June 2016 Friendly	Mexico	1–0	Chile	San Diego, United States
19ː00	J. Hernández 86'	Report		Stadium: Qualcomm Stadium; Referee: Baldomero Toledo (United States)

5 June 2016 Copa América Centenario	Mexico	3–1	Uruguay	Glendale, United States
20:00	Á. Pereira 4' (o.g.); Márquez 85'; Herrera 90+2'	Report (CONMEBOL); Report (CONCACAF)	Godín 74'	Stadium: University of Phoenix Stadium; Attendance: 60,025; Referee: Enrique Cáceres (Paraguay)

9 June 2016 Copa América Centenario	Mexico	2–0	Jamaica	Pasadena, United States
22:00	Hernández 18'; Peralta 81'	Report (CONMEBOL); Report (CONCACAF)		Stadium: Rose Bowl; Attendance: 83,263; Referee: Wilton Sampaio (Brazil)

13 June 2016 Copa América Centenario	Mexico	1–1	Venezuela	Houston, United States
20:00	J. M. Corona 80'	Report (CONMEBOL); Report (CONCACAF)	Velázquez 10'	Stadium: NRG Stadium; Attendance: 67,319; Referee: Yadel Martínez (Cuba)

18 June 2016 Copa América Centenario QF	Mexico	0–7	Chile	Santa Clara, United States
22:00		Report (CONMEBOL); Report (CONCACAF)	Puch 15', 87'; Vargas 43', 51', 57', 73'; Sánchez 48'	Stadium: Levi's Stadium; Attendance: 70,547; Referee: Héber Lopes (Brazil)

2 September 2016 2018 FIFA World Cup qualification R4	El Salvador	1–3	Mexico	San Salvador, El Salvador
20:06 UTC−6	Larín 24' (pen.)	Report (FIFA); Report (CONCACAF)	Moreno 52'; Sepúlveda 58'; Jiménez 73' (pen.)	Stadium: Estadio Cuscatlán; Attendance: 24,500; Referee: Armando Villarreal (United States)

6 September 2016 2018 FIFA World Cup qualification R4	Mexico	0–0	Honduras	Mexico City, Mexico
21:00 UTC−5		Report (FIFA); Report (CONCACAF)		Stadium: Estadio Azteca; Attendance: 41,008; Referee: Mark Geiger (United States)

8 October 2016 Friendly	Mexico	2–1	New Zealand	Nashville, United States
	dos Santos 29' (pen.); Fabián 56'		Rojas 46'	Stadium: Nissan Stadium; Referee: Jair Marrufo (United States)

11 October 2016 Friendly	Mexico	1–0	Panama	Bridgeview, United States
	Peralta 59'			Stadium: Toyota Park; Referee: Ted Unkel (United States)

11 November 2016 2018 FIFA World Cup qualification R5	United States	1–2	Mexico	Columbus, United States
20:01 UTC−5	Wood 49'	Report (FIFA); Report (CONCACAF)	Layún 20'; Márquez 88'	Stadium: Mapfre Stadium; Attendance: 24,640; Referee: Walter López Castellanos (Guatemala)

15 November 2016 2018 FIFA World Cup qualification R5	Panama	0–0	Mexico	Panama City, Panama
21:05 UTC−5		Report (FIFA); Report (CONCACAF)		Stadium: Estadio Rommel Fernández; Attendance: 26,500; Referee: Ricardo Montero (Costa Rica)

=== 2017 ===
8 February 2017 Friendly	Mexico	1–0	Iceland	Whitney, United States
20:00 (UTC-7)	Pulido 21'	Report		Stadium: Sam Boyd Stadium; Referee: Baldomero Toledo (United States)

24 March 2017 2018 FIFA World Cup qualification R5	Mexico	2–0	Costa Rica	Mexico City, Mexico
19:50 UTC−6	J. Hernández 8'; Araujo 45'	Report (FIFA); Report (CONCACAF)		Stadium: Estadio Azteca; Attendance: 61,697; Referee: John Pitti (Panama)

28 March 2017 2018 FIFA World Cup qualification R5	Trinidad and Tobago	0–1	Mexico	Port of Spain, Trinidad and Tobago
19:00 UTC−4		Report (FIFA); Report (CONCACAF)	D. Reyes 58'	Stadium: Hasely Crawford Stadium; Attendance: 14,822; Referee: Valdin Legister (Jamaica)

28 May 2017 Friendly	Mexico	1–2	Croatia	Los Angeles, United States
	Reyes (yellow card) 10'; Hernández 87'	Report	Čop 36' (yellow card) 90+2'; Tudor 37'; Škorić (yellow card) 64' (yellow card) 77' (red card); Barišić (yellow card) 86'	Stadium: Memorial Coliseum; Attendance: 62,317; Referee: Baldomero Toledo (United States)

1 June 2017 Friendly	Mexico	3–1	Republic of Ireland	East Rutherford, United States
20:30 (UTC−4)	J. M. Corona 16'; Jiménez 25' (pen.); Vela 54'	Report	Gleeson 76'	Stadium: MetLife Stadium; Attendance: 42,017; Referee: Ted Unkel (United States)

8 June 2017 2018 FIFA World Cup qualification R5	Mexico	3–0	Honduras	Mexico City, Mexico
21:00 UTC−5	Alanís 35'; Lozano 63'; Jiménez 66'	Report (FIFA); Report (CONCACAF)		Stadium: Estadio Azteca; Attendance: 38,565; Referee: Drew Fischer (Canada)

11 June 2017 (Note: The Mexico v United States match was brought forward from 13 June 2017 to accommodate Mexico's participation in the 2017 FIFA Confederations Cup.) 2018 FIFA World Cup qualification R5	Mexico	1–1	United States	Mexico City, Mexico
19:30 UTC−5	Vela 23'	Report (FIFA); Report (CONCACAF)	Bradley 6'	Stadium: Estadio Azteca; Attendance: 71,319; Referee: Joel Aguilar (El Salvador)

18 June 2017 2017 FIFA Confederations Cup	Portugal	2–2	Mexico	Kazan, Russia
18:00	Quaresma 34'; Cédric 86'	Report	Hernández 42'; Moreno 90+1'	Stadium: Kazan Arena; Attendance: 34,372; Referee: Néstor Pitana (Argentina)

21 June 2017 2017 FIFA Confederations Cup	Mexico	2–1	New Zealand	Sochi, Russia
21:00	Jiménez 54'; Peralta 72'	Report	Wood 42'	Stadium: Fisht Olympic Stadium; Attendance: 25,133; Referee: Bakary Gassama (Gambia)

24 June 2017 2017 FIFA Confederations Cup	Mexico	2–1	Russia	Kazan, Russia
18:00	Araujo 30'; Lozano 52'	Report	Samedov 25'	Stadium: Kazan Arena; Attendance: 41,585; Referee: Fahad Al-Mirdasi (Saudi Arabia)

28 June 2017 Friendly	Mexico	1–0	Ghana	Houston, United States
20:00 CDT	E. Hernández 32' (pen.)	Report		Stadium: NRG Stadium; Attendance: 37,617; Referee: Baldomero Toledo (United States)

29 June 2017 2017 FIFA Confederations Cup SF	Germany	4–1	Mexico	Sochi, Russia
21:00	Goretzka 6', 8'; Werner 59'; Younes 90+1'	Report	Fabián 89'	Stadium: Fisht Olympic Stadium; Attendance: 37,923; Referee: Néstor Pitana (Argentina)

1 July 2017 Friendly	Mexico	2–1	Paraguay	Seattle, United States
17:30 PDT	Pizarro 19'; E. Hernández 26' (pen.)	Report	Bareiro 45+2'	Stadium: CenturyLink Field, Referee: Ted Unkel (United States)

2 July 2017 2017 FIFA Confederations Cup 3rd	Portugal	2–1 (a.e.t.)	Mexico	Moscow, Russia
15:00	Pepe 90+1'; Adrien 104' (pen.)	Report	Neto 54' (o.g.)	Stadium: Otkritie Arena; Attendance: 42,659; Referee: Fahad Al-Mirdasi (Saudi Arabia)

9 July 2017 2017 CONCACAF Gold Cup	Mexico	3–1	El Salvador	San Diego, United States
21:00; 18:00 PDT (UTC−7)	Marín 8'; E. Hernández 29'; Pineda 55'	Report	Bonilla 10'	Stadium: Qualcomm Stadium; Attendance: 53,133; Referee: Óscar Moncada (Honduras)

13 July 2017 2017 CONCACAF Gold Cup	Mexico	0–0	Jamaica	Denver, United States
22:00; 20:00 MDT (UTC−6)		Report		Stadium: Sports Authority Field; Attendance: 49,121; Referee: Ricardo Montero (Costa Rica)

16 July 2017 2017 CONCACAF Gold Cup	Curaçao	0–2	Mexico	San Antonio, United States
20:00; 19:00 CDT (UTC−5)		Report	Sepúlveda 22'; Álvarez 90+1'	Stadium: Alamodome; Attendance: 44,232; Referee: Kimbell Ward (Saint Kitts and Nevis)

20 July 2017 2017 CONCACAF Gold Cup QF	Mexico	1–0	Honduras	Glendale, United States
22:30; 19:30 MST (UTC−7)	Pizarro 4'	Report		Stadium: State Farm Stadium; Attendance: 37,404; Referee: Walter López (Guatemala)

23 July 2017 2017 CONCACAF Gold Cup SF	Mexico	0–1	Jamaica	Pasadena, United States
21:00; 18:00 PDT (UTC−7)		Report	Lawrence 88'	Stadium: Rose Bowl; Attendance: 42,393; Referee: John Pitti (Panama)

1 September 2017 2018 FIFA World Cup qualification R5	Mexico	1–0	Panama	Mexico City, Mexico
20:30 UTC−5	Lozano 53'	Report (FIFA); Report (CONCACAF)		Stadium: Estadio Azteca; Attendance: 37,845; Referee: Walter López Castellanos (Guatemala)

5 September 2017 2018 FIFA World Cup qualification R5	Costa Rica	1–1	Mexico	San José, Costa Rica
20:05 UTC−6	Ureña 83'	Report (FIFA); Report (CONCACAF)	Gamboa 42' (o.g.)	Stadium: Estadio Nacional de Costa Rica; Attendance: 34,420; Referee: Mark Geiger (United States)

6 October 2017 2018 FIFA World Cup qualification R5	Mexico	3–1	Trinidad and Tobago	San Luis Potosí, Mexico
20:40 UTC−5	Lozano 78'; J. Hernández 88'; Herrera 90+4'	Report (FIFA); Report (CONCACAF)	Winchester 66'	Stadium: Estadio Alfonso Lastras; Attendance: 25,111; Referee: Kimbell Ward (Saint Kitts and Nevis)

10 October 2017 2018 FIFA World Cup qualification R5	Honduras	3–2	Mexico	San Pedro Sula, Honduras
18:00 UTC−6	Elis 34'; Ochoa 53' (o.g.); Quioto 60'	Report (FIFA); Report (CONCACAF)	Peralta 17'; Vela 37'	Stadium: Estadio Olímpico Metropolitano; Attendance: 37,000; Referee: Joel Aguilar (El Salvador)

10 November 2017 Friendly	Belgium	3–3	Mexico	Brussels, Belgium
	E. Hazard 18'; R. Lukaku 55', 70'	Report	Guardado 38'; Lozano 57', 60'	Stadium: King Baudouin Stadium; Attendance: 40,956; Referee: Paolo Mazzoleni (Italy)

13 November 2017 Friendly	Poland	0–1	Mexico	Gdańsk, Poland
20:45		Report	Jiménez 13'	Stadium: Stadion Energa Gdańsk; Attendance: 32,736; Referee: Oliver Drachta (Austria)

=== 2018 ===
31 January 2018 Friendly	Mexico	1–0	Bosnia and Herzegovina	San Antonio, United States
20:30 UTC−6	Ayala 65'	Report		Stadium: Alamodome; Attendance: 26,867; Referee: Armando Villarreal (United States)

23 March 2018 Friendly	Mexico	3–0	Iceland	Santa Clara, United States
19:00 UTC-7	Fabián 37'; Layún 64', 90+1'	Report		Stadium: Levi's Stadium; Attendance: 68.917; Referee: Armando Villarreal (United States)

28 March 2018 Friendly	Mexico	0–1	Croatia	Arlington, United States
		Report	Rakitić 62' (pen.)	Stadium: AT&T Stadium; Attendance: 79,128; Referee: Mario Escobar (Guatemala)

29 May 2018 Friendly	Mexico	0–0	Wales	Pasadena, United States
18:00 PDT (UTC−7)		BBC Report		Stadium: Rose Bowl; Attendance: 82,345; Referee: Armando Villarreal (United States)

2 June 2018 Friendly	Mexico	1–0	Scotland	Mexico City, Mexico
19ː00 (UTC−5)	G. dos Santos 13'			Stadium: Estadio Azteca; Attendance: 70,993; Referee: Henry Bejarano (Costa Rica)

9 June 2018 Friendly	Denmark	2–0	Mexico	Brøndby, Denmark
20:00 UTC+2	Y. Poulsen 71'; Eriksen 74'	Report		Stadium: Brøndby Stadium; Attendance: 16,376; Referee: Kai Erik Steen (Norway)

17 June 2018 2018 FIFA World Cup	Germany	0–1	Mexico	Moscow, Russia
18:00 MSK (UTC+3)		Report	Lozano 35'	Stadium: Luzhniki Stadium; Attendance: 78,011; Referee: Alireza Faghani (Iran)

23 June 2018 2018 FIFA World Cup	South Korea	1–2	Mexico	Rostov-on-Don, Russia
18:00 MSK (UTC+3)	Son Heung-min 90+3'	Report	Vela 26' (pen.); Hernández 66'	Stadium: Rostov Arena; Attendance: 43,472; Referee: Milorad Mažić (Serbia)

27 June 2018 2018 FIFA World Cup	Mexico	0–3	Sweden	Yekaterinburg, Russia
19:00 YEKT (UTC+5)		Report	Augustinsson 50'; Granqvist 62' (pen.); Álvarez 74' (o.g.)	Stadium: Central Stadium; Attendance: 33,061; Referee: Néstor Pitana (Argentina)

2 July 2018 2018 FIFA World Cup R16	Brazil	2–0	Mexico	Samara, Russia
18:00 SAMT (UTC+4)	Neymar 51'; Firmino 88'	Report		Stadium: Cosmos Arena; Attendance: 41,970; Referee: Gianluca Rocchi (Italy)

7 September 2018 Friendly	Mexico	1–4	Uruguay	Houston, United States
20:08 UTC−5	Jiménez 25' (pen.)		Giménez 21'; Suárez 32', 40' (pen.); Pereiro 59'	Stadium: NRG Stadium; Attendance: 60,617; Referee: Ismail Elfath (United States)

11 September 2018 Friendly	United States	1–0	Mexico	Nashville, United States
20:30 ET	Adams 71'			Stadium: Nissan Stadium; Attendance: 40,194; Referee: Ricardo Montero (Costa Rica)

11 October 2018 Friendly	Mexico	3–2	Costa Rica	San Nicolás de los Garza, Mexico
20:30 (UTC−5)	Guzmán 33'; Martín 56'; Jiménez 71' (pen.)	Report	Campbell 29'; Ruiz 44' (pen.)	Stadium: Estadio Universitario; Attendance: 35,827; Referee: Óscar Moncada (Honduras)

16 October 2018 Friendly	Mexico	0–1	Chile	Querétaro, Mexico
20:45 (UTC−5)			Castillo 89'	Stadium: Estadio Corregidora; Attendance: 33,000; Referee: Joel Aguilar (El Salvador)

16 November 2018 Friendly	Argentina	2–0	Mexico	Córdoba, Argentina
19:00 (UTC−3)	Funes Mori 44'; Brizuela 83' (o.g.)	Report		Stadium: Estadio Mario Alberto Kempes; Referee: Esteban Ostojich (Uruguay)

20 November 2018 Friendly	Argentina	2–0	Mexico	Mendoza, Argentina
21:00 (UTC−3)	Icardi 2'; Dybala 87'	Report		Stadium: Estadio Malvinas Argentinas; Attendance: 35,000; Referee: Andrés Rojas (Colombia)

=== 2019 ===
22 March 2019 Friendly	Mexico	3–1	Chile	San Diego, United States
19ː15 (UTC−7)	Jiménez 52' (pen.), Moreno 64', H. Lozano 65'		Castillo 69'	Stadium: SDCCU Stadium; Attendance: 49,617; Referee: Ted Unkel (United States)

26 March 2019 Friendly	Mexico	4–2	Paraguay	Santa Clara, United States
19:00 (UTC−7)	dos Santos 6'; Gómez 9' (o.g.); J. Hernández 24'; L. Montes 90+1'		Pérez 54'; D. González 84'	Stadium: Levi's Stadium; Attendance: 50,317; Referee: Keylor Herrera (Costa Rica)

5 June 2019 Friendly	Mexico	3–1	Venezuela	Atlanta, United States
20:00 (UTC−5)	Alvarado 32'; Pizarro 54'; Guardado 76'	Report	Murillo 18'	Stadium: Mercedes Benz Stadium; Referee: Ted Unkel (United States)

5 June 2019 Friendly	Mexico	3–2	Ecuador	Arlington, United States
18:00 (UTC−5)	Dos Santos 28'; L. Montes 63'; L. Rodríguez 77'	Report	Mena 47'; Preciado 66'	Stadium: AT&T Stadium; Attendance: 59,000; Referee: David Gantar (Canada)

15 June 2019 2019 CONCACAF Gold Cup	Mexico	7–0	Cuba	Pasadena, United States
22:00 (19:00 UTC−7)	Antuna 2', 44', 80'; Jiménez 31', 64'; Reyes 38'; Vega 74'	Report		Stadium: Rose Bowl; Attendance: 65,527; Referee: John Pitti (Panama)

19 June 2019 2019 CONCACAF Gold Cup	Mexico	3–1	Canada	Denver, United States
22:30 (20:30 UTC−6)	Alvarado 40'; Guardado 54', 77'	Report	Cavallini 75'	Stadium: Broncos Stadium at Mile High; Attendance: 52,874; Referee: Henry Bejarano (Costa Rica)

23 June 2019 2019 CONCACAF Gold Cup	Martinique	2–3	Mexico	Charlotte, United States
20:30	Parsemain 56'; Delem 84'	Report	Antuna 29'; Jiménez 61'; Navarro 72'	Stadium: Bank of America Stadium; Attendance: 59,283; Referee: Iván Barton (El Salvador)

29 June 2019 2019 CONCACAF Gold Cup QF	Mexico	1–1 (a.e.t.) (5–4 p)	Costa Rica	Houston, United States
22:00 (21:00 UTC−5)	Jiménez 44'	Report	Ruiz 52' (pen.)	Stadium: NRG Stadium; Attendance: 70,788; Referee: John Pitti (Panama)
	Penalties
	Jiménez (penalty missed); Montes (penalty scored); Alvarado (penalty scored); Gallardo (penalty scored); Moreno (penalty scored); Salcedo (penalty scored)		(penalty scored) Borges; (penalty scored) Aguilar; (penalty missed) Leal; (penalty scored) Duarte; (penalty scored) Calvo; (penalty missed) Fuller

2 July 2019 2019 CONCACAF Gold Cup SF	Haiti	0–1 (a.e.t.)	Mexico	Glendale, United States
22:30 (19:30 UTC−7)		Report	Jiménez 93' (pen.)	Stadium: State Farm Stadium; Attendance: 64,128; Referee: Abdulrahman Al-Jassim (Qatar)

7 July 2019 2019 CONCACAF Gold Cup F	Mexico	1–0	United States	Chicago, United States
20:15 CDT	Dos Santos 73'	Report		Stadium: Soldier Field; Attendance: 62,493; Referee: Mario Escobar (Guatemala)

6 September 2019 Friendly	United States	0–3	Mexico	East Rutherford, United States
20:30 ET		Report	J. Hernández 21'; Gutiérrez 78'; Antuna 82'	Stadium: MetLife Stadium; Attendance: 47,960; Referee: Joel Aguilar (El Salvador)

11 September 2019 Friendly	Mexico	4–0	Argentina	San Antonio, United States
21:00 ET		Report	Martínez 17', 22', 39'; Paredes 33' (pen.)	Stadium: Alamodome; Referee: Saíd Martínez (Honduras)

2 October 2019 Friendly	Mexico	2–0	Trinidad and Tobago	Toluca, Mexico
21:06 CT	Macías 23'; J. Angulo 31'	Report		Stadium: Estadio Nemesio Díez; Referee: Oliver Vergara (Panama)

11 October 2019 2019–20 CONCACAF Nations League	Bermuda	1–5	Mexico	Hamilton, Bermuda
21:00 (22:00 UTC−3)	Wells 56'	Report	Antuna 25'; Macías 45+2', 53'; Lozano 60'; Herrera 71'	Stadium: Bermuda National Stadium; Attendance: 705; Referee: Henry Bejarano (Costa Rica)

15 October 2019 2019–20 CONCACAF Nations League	Mexico	3–1	Panama	Mexico City, Mexico
21:30 (20:30 UTC−5)	Alvarado 28'; Macías 75'; Pizarro 90+2'	Report	Salcedo 42' (o.g.)	Stadium: Estadio Azteca; Attendance: 41,075; Referee: Iván Barton (El Salvador)

15 November 2019 2019–20 CONCACAF Nations League	Panama	0–3	Mexico	Panama City, Panama
21:00		Report	Jiménez 8', 85' (pen.); Álvarez 70'	Stadium: Estadio Rommel Fernández; Attendance: 16,407; Referee: Ricardo Montero (Costa Rica)

19 November 2019 2019–20 CONCACAF Nations League	Mexico	2–1	Bermuda	Toluca, Mexico
21:30 (20:30 UTC−6)	Córdova 27'; Antuna 90+3'	Report	Leverock 10'	Stadium: Estadio Nemesio Díez; Referee: Ismael Cornejo (El Salvador)
