= 22nd Guangdong–Hong Kong Cup =

Guangdong-Hong Kong Cup 1999–00 is the 22nd staging of this two-leg competition between Hong Kong and Guangdong.

The first leg was played in Guangzhou while the second leg was played in Hong Kong Stadium, both in 2000.

Hong Kong regained the champion after losing it for 6 consecutive years by winning an aggregate 2–1.

== Squads ==
=== Hong Kong ===
Some of the players in the squad include:

- (England) Mike Leonard 李安納
- (Hong Kong) Lo Kai Wah 羅繼華
- (Cameroon) Gerard Ambassa Guy 卓卓
- (Brazil) Cristiano Preigchadt Cordeiro 高尼路
- (Hong Kong) Lee Kin Wo 李健和
- (Paraguay) Gerardo Laterza 謝利
- (Federal Republic of Yugoslavia) Dejan Antonić 迪恩
- (Hong Kong) Cheng Siu Chung Ricky 鄭兆聰
- (Bosnia and Herzegovina) Alen Bajkusa 巴古沙
- (Brazil) Leandro Simioni 李安度
- (Brazil) Ailton Grigorio de Araujo 亞拉烏蘇
- (England) Gary McKeown 麥基昂
- (Bulgaria) Dimitre Kalkanov 卡根洛夫
- (Federal Republic of Yugoslavia) Zeljko Gavrilovic 加連奴域

== Results ==
First Leg

2000-01-02

Guangdong	0 – 1	Hong Kong
		Gerardo Laterza ?'

Guangdong People's Stadium, Guangzhou

Second Leg

2000-01-09

Hong Kong XI	1 – 1	Guangdong
Gerardo Laterza ?'		Zhang Yuewen ?'

Hong Kong Stadium, Hong Kong
