= Dimitre Kalkanov =

Bulgarian footballer

Personal information
- Full name: Dimitre Ganev Kalkanov
- Date of birth: 5 April 1966 (age 60)
- Place of birth: Bulgaria
- Positions: Defender; defensive midfielder

Senior career*
Years	Team	Apps	(Gls)
1983–1990	Lokomotiv Plovdiv		
1993	Kelantan		
1994	Selangor		
- Instant-Dict
- Happy Valley

International career
1985	Bulgaria U20	3	(0)
- * Club domestic league appearances and goals

Dimitre Ganev Kalkanov (Bulgarian: Димитър Ганев Калканов; born 5 April 1966) is a Bulgarian former professional footballer who played as a defender or defensive midfielder.

== Career ==
Kalkanov started his career with Lokomotiv Plovdiv. He took part in the 1985 FIFA World Youth Championship with Bulgaria, making three appearances in that tournament. Kalkanov then played in Hong Kong for Instant-Dict and Happy Valley, and in Malaysia for Selangor and Kelantan. While in Hong Kong, Kalkanov won the Hong Kong Footballer of the Year award in 1998, becoming the first non-Hong Konger to win the award. He played for the Hong Kong League XI at the 1998 Dynasty Cup, 2000 Guangdong–Hong Kong Cup and the Carlsberg Cup in 2000 and 2001. In 1998, he also made an appearance as part of the Hong Kong League XI against the Bulgaria national football team in a friendly match.
