= Japan national football team results (2000–2009) =

This article lists the results for the Japan national football team between 2000 and 2009.

== 2000 ==
Date	Opponent	Result	Score	Venue	Competition	Ref.
5 February 2000	Mexico	L	0–1	Hong Kong Stadium, Hong Kong	2000 Lunar New Year Cup	
8 February 2000	Hong Kong	D	0–0; 6–5 (pen.)^{1}	Hong Kong Stadium, Hong Kong	2000 Lunar New Year Cup	
13 February 2000	Singapore	W	3–0	Macau	2000 AFC Asian Cup qualification	
16 February 2000	Brunei	W	9–0	Macau	2000 AFC Asian Cup qualification	
20 February 2000	Macau	W	3–0	Macau	2000 AFC Asian Cup qualification	
15 March 2000	China	D	0–0	Kobe Universiade Memorial Stadium, Kobe, Japan	International Friendly (Kirin Challenge Cup)	
26 April 2000	South Korea	L	0–1	Seoul, South Korea	International Friendly	
4 June 2000	France	D	2–2; 2–4 (pen.)	Casablanca, Morocco	2000 King Hassan II International Cup Tournament	
6 June 2000	Jamaica	W	4–0	Casablanca, Morocco	2000 King Hassan II International Cup Tournament	
11 June 2000	Slovakia	D	1–1	Miyagi Stadium, Miyagi, Japan	Kirin Cup	
18 June 2000	Bolivia	W	2–0	International Stadium Yokohama, Japan	Kirin Cup	
16 August 2000	United Arab Emirates	W	3–1	Hiroshima Big Arch, Hiroshima, Japan	International Friendly (Kirin Challenge Cup)	
14 October 2000	Saudi Arabia	W	4–1	Saida Municipal Stadium, Saida, Lebanon	2000 AFC Asian Cup	
17 October 2000	Uzbekistan	W	8–1	Saida Municipal Stadium, Saida, Lebanon	2000 AFC Asian Cup	
20 October 2000	Qatar	D	1–1	Sports City Stadium, Beirut, Lebanon	2000 AFC Asian Cup	
24 October 2000	Iraq	W	4–1	Sports City Stadium, Beirut, Lebanon	2000 AFC Asian Cup	
26 October 2000	China	W	3–2	Sports City Stadium, Beirut, Lebanon	2000 AFC Asian Cup	
29 October 2000	Saudi Arabia	W	1–0	Sports City Stadium, Beirut, Lebanon	2000 AFC Asian Cup	
20 December 2000	South Korea	D	1–1	Tokyo National Stadium, Tokyo, Japan	International Friendly (Kirin Challenge Cup)	
^{1}: This match is not recognized by JFA as an official "A" match because the players came from Hong Kong League XI.

== 2001 ==
Date	Opponent	Result	Score	Venue	Competition	Ref.
24 March 2001	France	L	0–5	Saint-Denis, France	International Friendly	
25 April 2001	Spain	L	0–1	Córdoba, Spain	International Friendly	
31 May 2001	Canada	W	3–0	Niigata Stadium, Niigata, Japan	2001 FIFA Confederations Cup	
2 June 2001	Cameroon	W	2–0	Niigata Stadium, Niigata, Japan	2001 FIFA Confederations Cup	
4 June 2001	Brazil	D	0–0	Kashima Soccer Stadium, Kashima, Japan	2001 FIFA Confederations Cup	
7 June 2001	Australia	W	1–0	Yokohama International Stadium, Yokohama, Japan	2001 FIFA Confederations Cup	
10 June 2001	France	L	0–1	Yokohama International Stadium, Yokohama, Japan	2001 FIFA Confederations Cup	
1 July 2001	Paraguay	W	2–0	Sapporo Dome, Sapporo, Japan	Kirin Cup	
4 July 2001	FR Yugoslavia	W	1–0	Ōita Stadium, Ōita, Japan	Kirin Cup	
15 August 2001	Australia	W	3–0	Shizuoka Stadium, Fukuroi, Japan	AFC – OFC Challenge Cup	
4 October 2001	Senegal	L	0–2	Lens, Pas-de-Calais, France	International Friendly	
7 October 2001	Nigeria	D	2–2	Southampton, England	International Friendly	
7 November 2001	Italy	D	1–1	Saitama Stadium, Saitama, Japan	International Friendly (Kirin Challenge Cup)	

== 2002 ==
Date	Opponent	Result	Score	Venue	Competition	Ref.
21 March 2002	Ukraine	W	1–0	Nagai Stadium, Osaka, Japan	International Friendly (Kirin Challenge Cup)	
27 March 2002	Poland	W	2–0	Łódź, Poland	International Friendly	
17 April 2002	Costa Rica	D	1–1	Yokohama International Stadium, Yokohama, Japan	International Friendly (Kirin Challenge Cup)	
29 April 2002	Slovenia	W	1–0	Tokyo National Stadium, Tokyo, Japan	Kirin Cup	
2 May 2002	Honduras	D	3–3	Kobe Wing Stadium, Kobe, Japan	Kirin Cup	
7 May 2002	Real Madrid	L	0–1^{r}	Madrid, Spain	International Friendly	
14 May 2002	Norway	L	0–3	Oslo, Norway	International Friendly	
25 May 2002	Sweden	D	1–1	Tokyo National Stadium, Tokyo, Japan	International Friendly (Kirin Challenge Cup)	
4 June 2002	Belgium	D	2–2	Saitama Stadium, Saitama, Japan	2002 FIFA World Cup	
9 June 2002	Russia	W	1–0	Yokohama International Stadium, Yokohama, Japan	2002 FIFA World Cup	
14 June 2002	Tunisia	W	2–0	Nagai Stadium, Osaka, Japan	2002 FIFA World Cup	
18 June 2002	Turkey	L	0–1	Miyagi Stadium, Rifu, Japan	2002 FIFA World Cup	
16 October 2002	Jamaica	D	1–1	Tokyo National Stadium, Tokyo, Japan	International Friendly (Kirin Challenge Cup)	
20 November 2002	Argentina	L	0–2	Saitama Stadium, Saitama, Japan	International Friendly (Kirin Challenge Cup)	
^{r}: This club match is not recognized by JFA as an official "A" match.

== 2003 ==
Date	Opponent	Result	Score	Venue	Competition
28 March 2003	Uruguay	D	2–2	Tokyo National Stadium, Tokyo, Japan	International Friendly
16 April 2003	South Korea	W	1–0	Seoul, South Korea	International Friendly
31 May 2003	South Korea	L	0–1	Tokyo National Stadium, Tokyo, Japan	International Friendly
8 June 2003	Argentina	L	1–4	Nagai Stadium, Osaka, Japan	Kirin Cup
11 June 2003	Paraguay	D	0–0	Saitama Stadium 2002, Saitama, Japan	Kirin Cup
18 June 2003	New Zealand	W	3–0	Saint-Denis, France	2003 FIFA Confederations Cup
20 June 2003	France	L	1–2	Saint-Étienne, France	2003 FIFA Confederations Cup
22 June 2003	Colombia	L	0–1	Saint-Étienne, France	2003 FIFA Confederations Cup
20 August 2003	Nigeria	W	3–0	Tokyo National Stadium, Tokyo, Japan	International Friendly (Kirin Challenge Cup)
10 September 2003	Senegal	L	0–1	Niigata Stadium, Niigata, Japan	International Friendly (Kirin Challenge Cup)
8 October 2003	Tunisia	W	1–0	Rades, Tunisia	International Friendly
11 October 2003	Romania	D	1–1	Bucharest, Romania	International Friendly
19 November 2003	Cameroon	D	0–0	Ōita Stadium, Ōita, Japan	International Friendly (Kirin Challenge Cup)
4 December 2003	China	W	2–0	Tokyo National Stadium, Tokyo, Japan	2003 East Asian Football Championship
7 December 2003	Hong Kong	W	1–0	Saitama Stadium 2002, Saitama, Japan	2003 East Asian Football Championship
10 December 2003	South Korea	D	0–0	International Stadium Yokohama, Kanagawa, Japan	2003 East Asian Football Championship

== 2004 ==
Date	Opponent	Result	Score	Venue	Competition
7 February 2004	Malaysia	W	4–0	Kashima Soccer Stadium, Kashima, Japan	International Friendly (Kirin Challenge Cup)
12 February 2004	Iraq	D	2–0	Tokyo National Stadium, Tokyo, Japan	International Friendly
18 February 2004	Oman	W	1–0	Saitama Stadium 2002, Saitama, Japan	2006 FIFA World Cup qualification – AFC second round
31 March 2004	Singapore	W	2–1	Jalan Besar Stadium, Singapore	2006 FIFA World Cup qualification – AFC second round
25 April 2004	Hungary	L	2–3	Zalaegerszeg, Hungary	International Friendly
28 April 2004	Czech Republic	W	1–0	Prague, Czech Republic	International Friendly
30 May 2004	Iceland	W	3–2	(United Kingdom) Manchester, England	International Friendly
1 June 2004	England	D	1–1	(United Kingdom) Manchester, England	International Friendly
9 June 2004	India	W	7–0	Saitama Stadium 2002, Saitama, Japan	2006 FIFA World Cup qualification – AFC second round
9 July 2004	Slovenia	W	3–1	Hiroshima Big Arch, Hiroshima, Japan	Kirin Cup
13 July 2004	Serbia and Montenegro	W	1–0	Yokohama International Stadium, Yokohama, Japan	Kirin Cup
20 July 2004	Oman	W	1–0	Chongqing Olympic Sports Center, Chongqing, China	2004 AFC Asian Cup
24 July 2004	Thailand	W	4–1	Chongqing Olympic Sports Center, Chongqing, China	2004 AFC Asian Cup
28 July 2004	Iran	D	0–0	Chongqing Olympic Sports Center, Chongqing, China	2004 AFC Asian Cup
31 July 2004	Jordan	D	1–1 (a.e.t.); 4–3 (pen.)	Chongqing Olympic Sports Center, Chongqing, China	2004 AFC Asian Cup
3 August 2004	Bahrain	W	4–3 (a.e.t.)	Shandong Sports Center, Jinan, China	2004 AFC Asian Cup
7 August 2004	China	W	3–1	Workers Stadium, Beijing, China	2004 AFC Asian Cup
18 August 2004	Argentina	L	1–2	Shizuoka Stadium, Shizuoka, Japan	International Friendly (Kirin Challenge Cup)
8 September 2004	India	W	4–0	Yuva Bharati Krirangan, Bidhannagar, India	2006 FIFA World Cup qualification – AFC second round
13 October 2004	Oman	W	1–0	Sultan Qaboos Sports Complex, Muscat, Oman	2006 FIFA World Cup qualification – AFC second round
17 November 2004	Singapore	W	1–0	Saitama Stadium 2002, Saitama, Japan	2006 FIFA World Cup qualification – AFC second round
16 December 2004	Germany	L	0–3	Yokohama International Stadium, Yokohama, Japan	International Friendly (Kirin Challenge Cup)

== 2005 ==
Date	Opponent	Result	Score	Venue	Competition
29 January 2005	Kazakhstan	W	4–0	Yokohama International Stadium, Yokohama, Japan	International Friendly (Kirin Challenge Cup)
2 February 2005	Syria	W	3–0	Saitama Stadium 2002, Saitama, Japan	International Friendly (Kirin Challenge Cup)
9 February 2005	North Korea	W	2–1	Saitama Stadium 2002, Saitama, Japan	2006 FIFA World Cup qualification – AFC third round
25 March 2005	Iran	L	1–2	Azadi Stadium, Tehran, Iran	2006 FIFA World Cup qualification – AFC third round
30 March 2005	Bahrain	W	1–0	Saitama Stadium 2002, Saitama, Japan	2006 FIFA World Cup qualification – AFC third round
22 May 2005	Peru	L	0–1	Niigata Stadium, Niigata, Japan	Kirin Cup
27 May 2005	United Arab Emirates	L	0–1	Tokyo National Stadium, Tokyo, Japan	Kirin Cup
3 June 2005	Bahrain	W	1–0	Bahrain National Stadium, Manama, Bahrain	2006 FIFA World Cup qualification – AFC third round
8 June 2005	North Korea	W	2–0	Suphachalasai Stadium, Bangkok, Thailand	2006 FIFA World Cup qualification – AFC third round
16 June 2005	Mexico	L	1–2	AWD-Arena, Hanover, Germany	2005 FIFA Confederations Cup
19 June 2005	Greece	W	1–0	Waldstadion, Frankfurt am Main, Germany	2005 FIFA Confederations Cup
22 June 2005	Brazil	D	2–2	RheinEnergieStadion, Cologne, Germany	2005 FIFA Confederations Cup
31 July 2005	North Korea	L	0–1	Daejeon World Cup Stadium, Daejeon, South Korea	2005 East Asian Football Championship
3 August 2005	China	D	2–2	Daejeon World Cup Stadium, Daejeon, South Korea	2005 East Asian Football Championship
7 August 2005	South Korea	W	1–0	Daegu World Cup Stadium, Daegu, South Korea	2005 East Asian Football Championship
17 August 2005	Iran	W	2–1	Yokohama International Stadium, Yokohama, Japan	2006 FIFA World Cup qualification – AFC third round
7 September 2005	Honduras	W	5–4	Miyagi Stadium, Miyagi, Japan	International Friendly (Kirin Challenge Cup)
8 October 2005	Latvia	D	2–2	Riga, Latvia	International Friendly
12 October 2005	Ukraine	W	0–1	Kyiv, Ukraine	International Friendly
16 November 2005	Angola	W	1–0	Tokyo National Stadium, Tokyo, Japan	International Friendly (Kirin Challenge Cup)

== 2006 ==
Date	Opponent	Result	Score	Venue	Competition
10 February 2006	United States	L	2–3	AT&T Park, San Francisco, United States	International Friendly
18 February 2006	Finland	W	2–0	Shizuoka Stadium, Fukuroi, Japan	International Friendly (Kirin Challenge Cup)
22 February 2006	India	W	6–0	International Stadium Yokohama, Japan	2007 AFC Asian Cup qualification
28 February 2006	Bosnia and Herzegovina	D	2–2	Westfalenstadion, Dortmund, Germany	International Friendly
30 March 2006	Ecuador	W	1–0	Ōita Stadium, Ōita, Japan	International Friendly (Kirin Challenge Cup)
9 May 2006	Bulgaria	L	1–2	Nagai Stadium, Osaka, Japan	Kirin Cup
13 May 2006	Scotland	D	0–0	Saitama Stadium, Saitama, Japan	Kirin Cup
30 May 2006	Germany	D	2–2	BayArena, Leverkusen, Germany	International Friendly
4 June 2006	Malta	W	1–0	Esprit Arena, Düsseldorf, Germany	International Friendly
12 June 2006	Australia	L	1–3	Fritz Walter Stadion, Kaiserslautern, Germany	2006 FIFA World Cup
18 June 2006	Croatia	D	0–0	Frankenstadion, Nuremberg, Germany	2006 FIFA World Cup
22 June 2006	Brazil	L	1–4	Westfalenstadion, Dortmund, Germany	2006 FIFA World Cup
9 August 2006	Trinidad and Tobago	W	2–0	National Stadium, Tokyo, Japan	International Friendly (Kirin Challenge Cup)
16 August 2006	Yemen	W	2–0	Niigata Stadium, Niigata, Japan	2007 AFC Asian Cup qualification
3 September 2006	Saudi Arabia	L	0–1	Prince Abdullah al-Faisal Stadium, Jeddah, Saudi Arabia	2007 AFC Asian Cup qualification
6 September 2006	Yemen	W	1–0	Althawra Sports City Stadium, Sana'a, Yemen	2007 AFC Asian Cup qualification
4 October 2006	Ghana	L	0–1	International Stadium Yokohama, Japan	International Friendly (Kirin Challenge Cup)
11 October 2006	India	W	3–0	Sree Kanteerawa Stadium, Bangalore, India	2007 AFC Asian Cup qualification
15 November 2006	Saudi Arabia	W	3–1	Sapporo Dome, Sapporo, Japan	2007 AFC Asian Cup qualification

== 2007 ==
Date	Opponent	Result	Score	Venue	Competition
March 24, 2007	Peru	W	2–0	International Stadium, Yokohama, Japan	Friendly (Kirin Challenge Cup)
June 1, 2007	Montenegro	W	2–0	Shizuoka Stadium, Fukuroi, Japan	Kirin Cup
June 5, 2007	Colombia	D	0–0	Saitama Stadium, Saitama, Japan	Kirin Cup
July 9, 2007	Qatar	D	1–1	Mỹ Đình National Stadium, Hanoi, Vietnam	2007 AFC Asian Cup
July 13, 2007	United Arab Emirates	W	3–1	Mỹ Đình National Stadium, Hanoi, Vietnam	2007 AFC Asian Cup
July 16, 2007	Vietnam	W	4–1	Mỹ Đình National Stadium, Hanoi, Vietnam	2007 AFC Asian Cup
July 21, 2007	Australia	D	1–1 (a.e.t.); 4–3 (pen.)	Mỹ Đình National Stadium, Hanoi, Vietnam	2007 AFC Asian Cup
July 25, 2007	Saudi Arabia	L	2–3	Mỹ Đình National Stadium, Hanoi, Vietnam	2007 AFC Asian Cup
July 28, 2007	South Korea	D	0–0 (a.e.t.); 5–6 (pen.)	Jakabaring Stadium, Palembang, Indonesia	2007 AFC Asian Cup
August 22, 2007	Cameroon	W	2–0	Ōita Stadium, Ōita, Japan	Friendly (Kirin Challenge Cup)
September 7, 2007	Austria	W	0–0; 3–4 (pen.)	Wörthersee Stadion, Klagenfurt, Austria	Friendly
September 11, 2007	Switzerland	W	4–3	Wörthersee Stadion, Klagenfurt, Austria	Friendly
October 17, 2007	Egypt	W	4–1	Nagai Stadium, Osaka, Japan	2007 Afro-Asia Cup of Nations

== 2008 ==
Date	Opponent	Result	Score	Venue	Competition
January 26, 2008	Chile	D	0–0	National Stadium, Tokyo, Japan	Friendly (Kirin Challenge Cup)
January 30, 2008	Bosnia and Herzegovina	W	3–0	National Stadium, Tokyo, Japan	Friendly (Kirin Challenge Cup)
February 6, 2008	Thailand	W	4–1	Saitama Stadium, Saitama, Japan	2010 FIFA World Cup Qualification (AFC) – third round
February 17, 2008	North Korea	D	1–1	Olympic Sports Center, Chongqing, China	East Asian Cup
February 20, 2008	China	W	1–0	Olympic Sports Center, Chongqing, China	East Asian Cup
February 23, 2008	South Korea	D	1–1	Olympic Sports Center, Chongqing, China	East Asian Cup
March 26, 2008	Bahrain	L	0–1	National Stadium, Madinat 'Isa, Bahrain	2010 FIFA World Cup Qualification (AFC) – third round
May 24, 2008	Ivory Coast	W	1–0	Toyota Stadium, Toyota, Japan	Kirin Cup
May 27, 2008	Paraguay	D	0–0	Saitama Stadium, Saitama, Japan	Kirin Cup
June 2, 2008	Oman	W	3–0	International Stadium, Yokohama, Japan	2010 FIFA World Cup Qualification (AFC) – third round
June 7, 2008	Oman	D	1–1	Royal Oman Police Stadium, Muscat, Oman	2010 FIFA World Cup Qualification (AFC) – third round
June 14, 2008	Thailand	W	3–0	Rajamangala National Stadium, Bangkok, Thailand	2010 FIFA World Cup Qualification (AFC) – third round
June 22, 2008	Bahrain	W	1–0	Saitama Stadium, Saitama, Japan	2010 FIFA World Cup Qualification (AFC) – third round
August 20, 2008	Uruguay	L	1–3	Sapporo Dome, Sapporo, Japan	Friendly (Kirin Challenge Cup)
September 6, 2008	Bahrain	W	3–2	National Stadium, Madinat 'Isa, Bahrain	2010 FIFA World Cup Qualification (AFC) – fourth round
October 9, 2008	United Arab Emirates	D	1–1	Tohoku Denryoku Big Swan Stadium, Niigata, Japan	Friendly (Kirin Challenge Cup)
October 15, 2008	Uzbekistan	D	1–1	Saitama Stadium, Saitama, Japan	2010 FIFA World Cup Qualification (AFC) – fourth round
November 13, 2008	Syria	W	3–1	Home's Stadium Kobe, Kobe, Japan	Friendly (Kirin Challenge Cup)
November 19, 2008	Qatar	W	3–0	Jassim Bin Hamad Stadium, Doha, Qatar	2010 FIFA World Cup Qualification (AFC) – fourth round

== 2009 ==
Date	Opponent	Result	Score	Venue	Competition
20 January 2009	Yemen	W	2–1	KKWing Stadium, Kumamoto, Japan	2011 AFC Asian Cup qualification
28 January 2009	Bahrain	L	0–1	National Stadium, Madinat 'Isa, Bahrain	2011 AFC Asian Cup qualification
4 February 2009	Finland	W	5–1	National Stadium, Tokyo, Japan	Friendly Match (2009 Kirin Challenge Cup)
11 February 2009	Australia	D	0–0	International Stadium Yokohama, Japan	2010 FIFA World Cup qualification
28 March 2009	Bahrain	W	1–0	Saitama Stadium, Saitama, Japan	2010 FIFA World Cup qualification
27 May 2009	Chile	W	4–0	Nagai Stadium, Osaka, Japan	2009 Kirin Cup
31 May 2009	Belgium	W	4–0	National Stadium, Tokyo, Japan	2009 Kirin Cup
6 June 2009	Uzbekistan	W	1–0	Pakhtakor Stadium, Tashkent, Uzbekistan	2010 FIFA World Cup qualification
10 June 2009	Qatar	D	1–1	International Stadium Yokohama, Japan	2010 FIFA World Cup qualification
17 June 2009	Australia	L	1–2	Melbourne Cricket Ground, Melbourne, Australia	2010 FIFA World Cup qualification
5 September 2009	Netherlands	L	0–3	De Grolsch Veste, Enschede, Netherlands	Friendly Match
9 September 2009	Ghana	W	4–3	Stadion Galgenwaard, Utrecht, Netherlands	Friendly Match
8 October 2009	Hong Kong	W	6–0	Outsourcing Stadium, Shizuoka, Japan	2011 AFC Asian Cup qualification
10 October 2009	Scotland	W	2–0	International Stadium Yokohama, Yokohama. Japan	Friendly Match (2009 Kirin Challenge Cup)
14 October 2009	Togo	W	5–0	Miyagi Stadium, Rifu, Japan	Friendly Match (2009 Kirin Challenge Cup)
14 November 2009	South Africa	D	0–0	Nelson Mandela Stadium, Port Elizabeth, South Africa	Friendly Match
18 November 2009	Hong Kong	W	4–0	Hong Kong Stadium, Hong Kong	2011 AFC Asian Cup qualification
