= Jerry Laterza =

American soccer player

Personal information
- Full name: Gerardo Laterza
- Date of birth: July 1, 1974 (age 52)
- Place of birth: Los Angeles, California, United States
- Height: 6 ft 0 in (1.83 m)
- Position: Midfielder

Youth career
- 1992: SMU Mustangs

Senior career*
Years	Team	Apps	(Gls)
1993	Veracruz		
1993	Los Angeles Salsa	4	(0)
1994–1995	Cerro Porteño		
1997	Orange County Zodiac		
1997	LA Galaxy	4	(0)
1997	→ Carolina Dynamo (loan)	1	(0)
1998	Seattle Sounders	2	(0)
1998	Qianwei Huandao		
1999	Shenyang Haishi		
1999	Kitchee		
1999	→ South China (loan)		
1999–2000	South China		
2002	Guangzhou Xiangxue		
2003	Ningbo Yaoma		
2003–2004	Buler Rangers		
- * Club domestic league appearances and goals

Gerardo "Jerry" Laterza (born July 1, 1974) is an American former soccer player. He is the technical director of Newport Mesa Soccer Club. He was the first Paraguayan American to play football in Paraguay.

== Career ==
Laterza graduated from Walnut High School where he was the 1990 and 1992 California Interscholastic Federation 1-A Player of the Year. Laterza attended Southern Methodist University, playing on the men's soccer team in 1992. On April 3, 1993, Laterza signed with the Los Angeles Salsa of the American Professional Soccer League. In 1997, Laterza began the season with the Orange County Zodiac. In July 1997, the Los Angeles Galaxy of Major League Soccer signed Laterza. He played four games for the Galaxy in 1997, plus one game on loan to the Carolina Dynamo. The Galaxy released him on April 1, 1998, during a pre-season roster reduction. On April 10, 1998, Laterza signed with the Seattle Sounders of the USL A-League. He played two games, then was released on April 22. He then played for several clubs, including South China AA, and various teams in Hong Kong, China and Paraguay. While in Hong Kong, he was selected to play for Hong Kong League XI, featuring in one of the matches against Paraguay.
