= Miguel Zepeda =

Mexican footballer (born 1976)

Personal information
- Full name: Miguel Ángel Zepeda Espinoza
- Date of birth: 25 May 1976 (age 50)
- Place of birth: Tepic, Nayarit, Mexico
- Height: 1.65 m (5 ft 5 in)
- Position: Midfielder

Senior career*
Years	Team	Apps	(Gls)
1996–2001	Atlas	144	(34)
2001–2003	Cruz Azul	64	(17)
2003	Morelia	17	(2)
2004	Toluca	21	(3)
2004–2005	Cruz Azul	20	(7)
2005	Santos Laguna	13	(3)
2006	América	5	(0)
2006	San Luis	8	(0)
2007	Veracruz	5	(0)
2009–2010	Atlas	20	(7)
2010–2011	Leones Negros	41	(18)
2011–2012	Veracruz	8	(2)
Total		366	(93)

International career
1999–2005	Mexico	50	(8)
Medal record
Men's football
Representing Mexico
FIFA Confederations Cup
Winner	1999 Mexico
CONCACAF Gold Cup
Winner	2003 United States–Mexico
Copa América
Runner-up	2001 Colombia
Third place	1999 Paraguay
- * Club domestic league appearances and goals as of 21 February 2013

Miguel Ángel Zepeda Espinoza (born 25 May 1976) is a Mexican former professional footballer who played as a midfielder.

== Career ==
Zepeda made his professional debut on November 13, 1996, in 2–2 draw against Chivas. He has played most of his career with Atlas, from 1996 to 2001. In the Invierno 2001 he transferred to Cruz Azul. With Cruz Azul Zepeda spent 4 short tournaments. In the 2003 Apertura Zepeda transferred to Monarcas Morelia, where he did not have any success. In the 2004 Clausura Zepeda he transferred to Toluca, where Toluca got eliminated in the semifinals by Guadalajara. Zepeda went back with Cruz Azul for two more seasons (Apertura 2004), (Clausura 2005). He later transferred to Santos Laguna, but he did not have much success, so he transferred to America. With Club América he only played in five games and did not score any goals, but won the 2006 CONCACAF Cup. Zepeda transferred to San Luis for the 2006 Apertura, where once again he did not have much success. After two years without playing professionally he's playing again for Atlas. Since his return to F.C Atlas Zepeda struggled during his first season, but after regaining his form. Due to differences between Zepeda and the Atlas institucion, Zepeda was separated from the team mid-season.

== International career ==
Zepeda has played with the Mexico national team; his debut was in February 1999 against Argentina. He was part of the squad that won the Confederations Cup 1999 in which he scored two goals in the final against Brazil, thus making 2 goals in the entire tournament. Zepeda was with the Mexico national team when they won the 2003 Gold Cup.

== Career statistics ==
=== International goals ===
No.	Date	Venue	Opponent	Score	Result	Competition
1.	July 17, 1999	Estadio Defensores del Chaco, Asunción, Paraguay	Chile	2–1	2–1	1999 Copa América
2.	August 4, 1999	Estadio Azteca, Mexico City, Mexico	Brazil	1–0	4–3	1999 FIFA Confederations Cup
3.	August 4, 1999	Estadio Azteca, Mexico City, Mexico	Brazil	3–2	4–3	1999 FIFA Confederations Cup
4.	February 5, 2000	Hong Kong Stadium, Wan Chai, Hong Kong	Japan	1–0	1–0	2000 Carlsberg Cup
5.	February 8, 2000	Hong Kong Stadium, Wan Chai, Hong Kong	Czech Republic	1–2	1–2	2000 Carlsberg Cup
6.	July 5, 2000	Estadio Tecnológico, Monterrey, Mexico	Venezuela	1–1	2–1	Friendly
7.	July 16, 2000	Estadio Rommel Fernández, Panama City, Panama	Panama	1–0	1–0	2002 FIFA World Cup qualification
8.	September 3, 2000	Estadio Azteca, Mexico City, Mexico	Panama	3–0	7–1	2002 FIFA World Cup qualification

== Honours ==
Mexico

- FIFA Confederations Cup: 1999
- Copa América runner-up: 2001; third place: 1999
- CONCACAF Gold Cup: 2003
