= Alen Bajkuša =

Bosnia and Herzegovinian footballer (born 1971)

Personal information
- Date of birth: 26 June 1971 (age 54)
- Place of birth: Sarajevo, SFR Yugoslavia
- Height: 1.80 m (5 ft 11 in)
- Position: Forward

Senior career*
| Years | Team | Apps | (Gls) |
| –1993 | Željezničar | | |
| 1992–1993 | Penang | | |
| 1994–1995 | Golden | | |
| 1995–1996 | South China | | |
| 1996–1998 | Caen | 14 | (2) |
| 1998–1999 | Étoile Carouge | 4 | (1) |
| 1999–2000 | Happy Valley | | |
| 2000–2001 | Lombard Tatabánya | 23 | (2) |
| 2001–2002 | Egaleo | 2 | (0) |
| 2002–2003 | Željezničar | | |
| 2003–2004 | Široki Brijeg | | |
- * Club domestic league appearances and goals

Alen Bajkuša (born 26 June 1971) is a Bosnia and Herzegovinian former professional footballer who played as a forward. His career began at FK Željezničar.

== Club career ==
Bajkuša was born Sarajevo. He joined Hong Kong giants South China in 1994 from Malaysian side Penang. He also played for Golden in Hong Kong.

He later played for Caen in the French Ligue 1, but returned to Hong Kong in April 1999 to play for Happy Valley.

== International career ==
Bajkuša played for Hong Kong League XI in the 1994 Carlsberg Cup and scored for them in the 2000 tournament.
