= 2000 Lunar New Year Cup =

Tournament details
- Host country: Hong Kong
- Dates: 5–8 February
- Teams: 4
- Venue: 1 (in 1 host city)

Final positions
- Champions: Czech Republic (1st title)

Tournament statistics
- Matches played: 4
- Goals scored: 8 (2 per match)
- Top scorer: (Mexico) Miguel Zepeda (2 goals)

The 2000 Lunar New Year Cup (a.k.a. Carlsberg Cup) was a football tournament held in Hong Kong to celebrate the Chinese New Year holiday.

== Participating teams ==
- Czech Republic
- Hong Kong League XI (host)
- Mexico
- Japan

== Squads ==
=== Japan ===
Coach: (France) Philippe Troussier

No.	Pos.	Player	Date of birth (age)	Caps	Club
1	GK	Eiji Kawashima	20 March 1983 (aged 16)		(Japan) Urawa Higashi High School
2	DF	Go Oiwa	23 June 1972 (aged 27)		(Japan) Nagoya Grampus Eight
3	DF	Naoki Matsuda	14 March 1977 (aged 22)		(Japan) Yokohama F·Marinos
6	MF	Toshihiro Hattori	23 September 1973 (aged 26)		(Japan) Júbilo Iwata
7	MF	Teruyoshi Ito	31 August 1974 (aged 25)		(Japan) Shimizu S-Pulse
8	MF	Shigeyoshi Mochizuki	9 July 1973 (aged 26)		(Japan) Nagoya Grampus Eight
9	FW	Masashi Nakayama	23 September 1967 (aged 32)		(Japan) Júbilo Iwata
10	MF	Hiroshi Nanami	28 November 1972 (aged 27)		(Italy) Venezia
11	FW	Kazuyoshi Miura	26 February 1967 (aged 32)		(Japan) Kyoto Purple Sanga
12	MF	Masaaki Sawanobori	12 January 1970 (aged 30)		(Japan) Shimizu S-Pulse
13	MF	Shinji Ono	27 September 1979 (aged 20)		(Japan) Urawa Red Diamonds
14	DF	Takashi Hirano	15 July 1974 (aged 25)		(Japan) Nagoya Grampus Eight
15	MF	Daisuke Oku	7 February 1976 (aged 23)		(Japan) Júbilo Iwata
16	DF	Yuji Nakazawa	25 February 1978 (aged 21)		(Japan) Verdy Kawasaki
16	DF	Kōji Nakata	9 July 1979 (aged 20)		(Japan) Kashima Antlers
17	FW	Tomoyuki Hirase	23 May 1977 (aged 22)		(Japan) Kashima Antlers
18	GK	Seigo Narazaki	15 April 1976 (aged 23)		(Japan) Nagoya Grampus Eight
21	MF	Tomokazu Myojin	24 January 1978 (aged 22)		(Japan) Kashiwa Reysol
23	MF	Shunsuke Nakamura	24 June 1978 (aged 21)		(Japan) Yokohama F. Marinos
24	MF	Junichi Inamoto	18 September 1979 (aged 20)		(Japan) Gamba Osaka

== Results ==
All times given in Hong Kong Time (UTC+8).

=== Semifinals ===
5 February 2000

Mexico	1–0	Japan
Zepeda 55'

Hong Kong Stadium, Hong Kong
Attendance: -
Referee: Hugh Dallas (Scotland)
5 February 2000

Hong Kong League XI	2–2	Czech Republic
Bajkusa 26'; Cheng 48'		Jankulovski 48'; Kincl 88'
Penalties
	5–6

Hong Kong Stadium, Hong Kong
Attendance: -
Referee: Kim Milton Nielsen (Denmark)

=== Third place match ===
8 February 2000

Hong Kong League XI	0–0	Japan
Penalties
	5–6

Hong Kong Stadium, Hong Kong
Attendance: -
Referee: Hugh Dallas (Scotland)

=== Final ===
8 February 2000

Mexico	1–2	Czech Republic
Zepeda 80'		Kolomazník 59'; Verbíř 55'

Hong Kong Stadium, Hong Kong
Attendance: -
Referee: Kim Milton Nielsen (Denmark)

== Bracket ==
Semi-finals
5 February 2000 – Hong Kong
Mexico	1
Japan	0
5 February 2000 – Hong Kong
Hong Kong League XI	2 (5)
Czech Republic (pen.)	2 (6)

Final
8 February 2000 – Hong Kong
Mexico	1
Czech Republic	2
Third place
8 February 2000 – Hong Kong
Hong Kong League XI	0 (5)
Japan (pen.)	0 (6)

2000 Carlsberg Cup champions

Czech Republic
First title

== Scorers ==
2 goals

- (Mexico) Miguel Zepeda

1 goals

- (Czech Republic) Marek Jankulovski
- (Czech Republic) Marek Kincl
- (Czech Republic) Michal Kolomazník
- (Czech Republic) Pavel Verbíř
- (Hong Kong) Cheng Siu Chung
- (Hong Kong) Alen Bajkusa

== See also ==
- Hong Kong Football Association
- Hong Kong First Division League
