= 2001 Copa América knockout stage =

The 2001 Copa América knockout stage was the elimination stage of the Copa América, following the group stage. It began on 22 July 2001 and consisted of the quarter-finals, the semi-finals, the third-place play-off, and the final held at Estadio El Campín on 29 July, in Bogotá. No extra time was to be played if any match in the final stages finished tied after regulation; the match would go straight to a penalty shoot-out.

All times are in local, Colombia Time (UTC−05:00).

== Qualified teams ==
The top two placed teams from each of the three groups, plus the two best-placed third teams, qualified for the knockout stage.

Group	Winners	Runners-up	Third-placed team (Best two qualify)
A	Colombia	Chile	—N/a
B	Brazil	Mexico	Peru
C	Costa Rica	Honduras	Uruguay

== Bracket ==
Quarter-finals
22 July – Pereira
Chile	0
Mexico	2
22 July – Armenia
Costa Rica	1
Uruguay	2
23 July – Armenia
Colombia	3
Peru	0
23 July – Manizales
Brazil	0
Honduras	2

Semi-finals
25 July – Pereira
Mexico	2
Uruguay	1
26 July – Manizales
Colombia	2
Honduras	0

Final
29 July – Bogotá
Mexico	0
Colombia	1
Third place
29 July – Bogotá
Uruguay	2 (4)
Honduras (p)	2 (5)

== Quarter-finals ==
=== Chile v Mexico ===
22 July 2001
15:00

Chile	0–2	Mexico
	Report	Arellano 17'; Osorno 78'

Estadio Hernán Ramírez Villegas, Pereira
Attendance: 20,000
Referee: Carlos Eugênio Simon (Brazil)

Chile	Mexico

GK	1	Sergio Vargas
DF	5	Luis Fuentes
DF	6	Pedro Reyes
DF	7	Eros Pérez		(substituted off) 66'
DF	16	Ricardo Rojas	(yellow card) 24'
MF	3	Claudio Maldonado
MF	8	Alejandro Osorio
MF	18	Marco Villaseca	(yellow card) 37'
MF	20	Rodrigo Núñez		(substituted off) 41'
FW	9	Reinaldo Navia
FW	15	Cristián Montecinos
Substitutions:
MF	11	Rodrigo Valenzuela		(substituted on) 41'
FW	10	Manuel Neira		(substituted on) 66'
Manager:
Pedro García

GK	12	Óscar Pérez	(yellow card) 67'
DF	2	Alberto Rodríguez		(substituted off) 26'
DF	4	Rafael Márquez
DF	5	Manuel Vidrio	(yellow card) 54'
DF	3	Heriberto Morales
MF	6	Gerardo Torrado
MF	20	Ramón Morales
MF	8	Alberto García Aspe
MF	18	Johan Rodríguez		(substituted off) 66'
MF	21	Jesús Arellano
FW	14	Antonio de Nigris	(yellow card) 37'	(substituted off) 70'
Substitutions:
MF	19	Miguel Zepeda		(substituted on) 26'
MF	13	Sigifredo Mercado		(substituted on) 66'
FW	11	Daniel Osorno		(substituted on) 70'
Manager:
Javier Aguirre

=== Costa Rica v Uruguay ===
22 July 2001
17:30

Costa Rica	1–2	Uruguay
Wanchope 52'	Report	Lemos 61' (pen.); Lima 87'

Estadio Centenario, Armenia
Attendance: 29,000
Referee: Óscar Ruiz (Colombia)

Costa Rica	Uruguay

GK	1	Erick Lonnis	(yellow card) 32'
DF	2	Jervis Drummond
DF	3	Luis Marín	(yellow card) 26'
DF	21	Reynaldo Parks
DF	5	Gilberto Martínez
MF	10	Walter Centeno		(substituted off) 68'
MF	8	Mauricio Solís	(yellow card) 28'
MF	22	Carlos Castro
FW	7	Rolando Fonseca
FW	11	Rónald Gómez		(substituted off) 65'
FW	9	Paulo Wanchope	(yellow card) 88'
Substitutions:
MF	16	Steven Bryce		(substituted on) 65'
MF	19	Rodrigo Cordero		(substituted on) 68'
Manager:
Alexandre Guimarães

GK	1	Gustavo Munúa	(yellow card) 90'
DF	3	Gonzalo Sorondo
DF	6	Pablo Lima
DF	14	Alejandro Curbelo
DF	13	Carlos Gutiérrez
DF	16	Jorge Anchén
MF	7	Christian Callejas	(yellow card) 10'
MF	5	Diego Pérez
MF	9	Rodrigo Lemos		(substituted off) 89'
FW	15	Carlos María Morales	(yellow card) 32'	(substituted off) 70'
FW	20	Richard Morales
Substitutions:
MF	10	Rubén Olivera		(substituted on) 70'
MF	8	Andrés Martínez		(substituted on) 89'
Manager:
Víctor Púa

=== Colombia v Peru ===
23 July 2001
17:30

Colombia	3–0	Peru
Aristizábal 50', 69'; Hernández 66'	Report

Estadio Centenario, Armenia
Attendance: 30,000
Referee: Gilberto Alcalá (Mexico)

Colombia	Peru

GK	1	Óscar Córdoba
DF	16	Jersson González
DF	5	Andrés Orozco
DF	3	Mario Yepes	(yellow card) 75'
DF	20	Gerardo Bedoya		(substituted off) 46'
MF	17	Juan Carlos Ramírez		(substituted off) 83'
MF	6	Fabián Vargas
MF	19	Freddy Grisales
MF	24	Giovanni Hernández		(substituted off) 74'
MF	8	David Ferreira
FW	10	Víctor Aristizábal
Substitutions:
DF	4	Roberto Carlos Cortés		(substituted on) 46'
MF	23	Mauricio Molina		(substituted on) 74'
MF	21	Óscar Díaz		(substituted on) 83'
Manager:
Francisco Maturana

GK	1	Óscar Ibáñez	(yellow card) 33'
DF	2	Wálter Zevallos
DF	5	Juan Pajuelo
DF	15	Santiago Salazar
DF	3	José Soto
DF	6	Juan Francisco Hernández		(substituted off) 65'
MF	16	Pedro García
MF	8	Juan Jayo	(yellow card) 75'
MF	20	José del Solar		(substituted off) 77'
MF	14	Jorge Soto		(substituted off) 74'
FW	18	Roberto Holsen
Substitutions:
MF	24	Gustavo Tempone		(substituted on) 46'
DF	19	Walter Vílchez		(substituted on) 65'
MF	10	Édson Uribe		(substituted on) 74'
Manager:
Julio César Uribe

=== Brazil v Honduras ===
23 July 2001
19:45

Brazil	0–2	Honduras
	Report	Belletti 57' (o.g.); Martínez 90+4'

Estadio Palogrande, Manizales
Attendance: 30,000
Referee: Ubaldo Aquino (Paraguay)

Brazil	Honduras

GK	1	Marcos
DF	2	Juliano Belletti
DF	3	Cris
DF	14	Luisão		(substituted off) 46'
DF	15	Juan
DF	16	Júnior	(yellow card) 60'
MF	5	Eduardo Costa	(yellow card) 46'	(substituted off) 65'
MF	8	Emerson	(red card) 82'
MF	11	Denílson
MF	20	Alex		(substituted off) 46'
FW	9	Guilherme
Substitutions:
MF	10	Juninho Paulista		(substituted on) 46'
MF	17	Juninho Pernambucano		(substituted on) 46'
FW	22	Mário Jardel		(substituted on) 65'
Manager:
Luiz Felipe Scolari

GK	22	Noel Valladares
DF	3	David Cárcamo	(red card) 82'
DF	4	Samuel Caballero
DF	21	Limber Pérez
DF	24	Ninrrol Medina	(yellow card) 89'
MF	10	Julio César de León		(substituted off) 88'
MF	13	Robel Bernárdez
MF	15	Ricky García
MF	19	Danilo Turcios		(substituted off) 68'
MF	20	Amado Guevara
FW	18	Saúl Martínez	(yellow card) 55'
Substitutions:
MF	14	Mario César Rodríguez		(substituted on) 68'
DF	23	Júnior Izaguirre		(substituted on) 88'
Manager:
Ramón Maradiaga

== Semi-finals ==
=== Mexico v Uruguay ===
25 July 2001
19:45

Mexico	2–1	Uruguay
Borgetti 14'; García Aspe 67' (pen.)	Report	R. Morales 32'

Estadio Hernán Ramírez Villegas, Pereira
Attendance: 20,000
Referee: Ángel Sánchez (Argentina)

Mexico	Uruguay

GK	12	Óscar Pérez
DF	21	Jesús Arellano
DF	4	Rafael Márquez	(yellow card) 39'	(substituted off) 62'
DF	5	Manuel Vidrio	(red card) 90'
DF	3	Heriberto Morales
MF	20	Ramón Morales
MF	8	Alberto García Aspe	(yellow card) 21' (yellow-red card) 87'
MF	19	Miguel Zepeda		(substituted off) 33'
MF	18	Johan Rodríguez		(substituted off) 55'
MF	6	Gerardo Torrado	(yellow card) 89'
FW	9	Jared Borgetti
Substitutions:
MF	13	Sigifredo Mercado		(substituted on) 33'
FW	14	Antonio de Nigris	(yellow card) 78'	(substituted on) 55'
DF	2	Alberto Rodríguez		(substituted on) 62'
Manager:
Javier Aguirre

GK	1	Gustavo Munúa
DF	3	Gonzalo Sorondo
DF	2	Joe Bizera		(substituted off) 75'
DF	6	Pablo Lima	(yellow card) 44'
DF	13	Carlos Gutiérrez
DF	16	Jorge Anchén	(yellow card) 53'	(substituted off) 60'
MF	7	Christian Callejas	(yellow card) 58'
MF	5	Diego Pérez	(yellow card) 90'
MF	9	Rodrigo Lemos		(substituted off) 67'
FW	15	Carlos María Morales	(red card) 45'
FW	20	Richard Morales	(red card) 90'
Substitutions:
DF	4	Carlos Díaz		(substituted on) 60'
MF	10	Rubén Olivera		(substituted on) 67'
MF	18	Fabián Estoyanoff		(substituted on) 75'
Manager:
Víctor Púa

=== Colombia v Honduras ===
26 July 2001
19:45

Colombia	2–0	Honduras
Bedoya 6'; Aristizábal 63'	Report

Estadio Palogrande, Manizales
Attendance: 40,000
Referee: Mario Sánchez (Chile)

Colombia	Honduras

GK	1	Óscar Córdoba
DF	14	Iván López
DF	2	Iván Córdoba
DF	3	Mario Yepes
DF	20	Gerardo Bedoya
MF	17	Juan Carlos Ramírez	(yellow card) 29'
MF	19	Freddy Grisales
MF	6	Fabián Vargas
MF	24	Giovanni Hernández
FW	15	Elkin Murillo		(substituted off) 90'
FW	10	Víctor Aristizábal		(substituted off) 72'
Substitutions:
FW	11	Eudalio Arriaga		(substituted on) 72'
MF	13	John Restrepo		(substituted on) 90'
Manager:
Francisco Maturana

GK	22	Noel Valladares
DF	21	Limber Pérez	(yellow card) 78'
DF	4	Samuel Caballero
DF	24	Ninrrol Medina
DF	17	Carlos Güity
MF	13	Robel Bernárdez
MF	15	Ricky García	(yellow card) 28'	(substituted off) 60'
MF	19	Danilo Turcios		(substituted off) 67'
MF	20	Amado Guevara	(yellow card) 32'
MF	10	Julio César de León	(yellow card) 28'
FW	18	Saúl Martínez		(substituted off) 73'
Substitutions:
MF	16	Reynaldo Pineda		(substituted on) 60'
MF	14	Mario César Rodríguez		(substituted on) 67'
FW	8	Marvin Brown		(substituted on) 73'
Manager:
Ramón Maradiaga

== Third-place match ==
29 July 2001
14:00

Uruguay	2–2	Honduras
Bizera 22'; A. Martínez 45'	Report	S. Martínez 14'; Izaguirre 42'
Penalties
Sorondo (penalty scored); Gutiérrez (penalty missed); Rodríguez (penalty scored); Lemos (penalty scored); Olivera (penalty scored)	4–5	(penalty scored) Pineda; (penalty scored) Martínez; (penalty scored) García; (penalty scored) Medina; (penalty scored) Izaguirre

Estadio El Campín, Bogotá
Attendance: 47,000
Referee: Gilberto Hidalgo (Peru)

Uruguay	Honduras

GK	12	Adrián Berbia
DF	4	Carlos Díaz
DF	13	Carlos Gutiérrez
DF	3	Gonzalo Sorondo	(yellow card) 41'
DF	2	Joe Bizera	(yellow card) 16'
MF	22	Claudio Dadómo		(substituted off) 85'
MF	8	Andrés Martínez	(yellow card) 45+1'	(substituted off) 65'
MF	5	Diego Pérez
MF	9	Rodrigo Lemos
MF	18	Fabián Estoyanoff	(yellow card) 43'
FW	11	Walter Guglielmone		(substituted off) 56'
Substitutions:
MF	10	Rubén Olivera		(substituted on) 56'
DF	17	Julio Pablo Rodríguez		(substituted on) 65'
DF	6	Pablo Lima		(substituted on) 85'
Manager:
Víctor Púa

GK	1	Henry Enamorado
DF	4	Samuel Caballero
DF	23	Júnior Izaguirre
DF	26	Leonardo Morales	(yellow card) 13'	(substituted off) 80'
DF	21	Limber Pérez
MF	15	Ricky García
MF	13	Robel Bernárdez
MF	19	Danilo Turcios		(substituted off) 64'
MF	20	Amado Guevara		(substituted off) 89'
MF	16	Reynaldo Pineda	(yellow card) 78'
FW	18	Saúl Martínez
Substitutions:
MF	14	Mario César Rodríguez		(substituted on) 64'
DF	24	Ninrrol Medina		(substituted on) 80'
DF	2	Hesler Phillips		(substituted on) 89'
Manager:
Ramón Maradiaga

== Final ==
29 July 2001
16:30

Mexico	0–1	Colombia
	Report	I. Córdoba 65'

Estadio El Campín, Bogotá
Attendance: 47,000
Referee: Ubaldo Aquino (Paraguay)

Mexico	Colombia

GK	12	Óscar Pérez
RB	2	Alberto Rodríguez		(substituted off) 74'
CB	13	Sigifredo Mercado
CB	3	Heriberto Morales
LB	7	Octavio Valdez
RM	15	Juan Pablo Rodríguez	(red card) 79'
DM	6	Gerardo Torrado	(yellow card) 22' (yellow-red card) 90+4'
DM	18	Johan Rodríguez		(substituted off) 67'
AM	21	Jesús Arellano (c)		(substituted off) 59'
LM	20	Ramón Morales	(yellow card) 70'
CF	9	Jared Borgetti
Substitutions:
MF	10	Cesáreo Victorino		(substituted on) 59'
FW	11	Daniel Osorno		(substituted on) 67'
FW	19	Miguel Zepeda		(substituted on) 74'
Manager:
Javier Aguirre

GK	1	Óscar Córdoba
RB	14	Iván López
CB	2	Iván Córdoba (c)
CB	3	Mario Yepes
LB	20	Gerardo Bedoya	(yellow card) 20'
RM	19	Freddy Grisales
CM	6	Fabián Vargas	(yellow card) 29'
CM	17	Juan Carlos Ramírez
LM	24	Giovanni Hernández		(substituted off) 88'
CF	10	Víctor Aristizábal		(substituted off) 32'
CF	15	Elkin Murillo
Substitutions:
FW	18	Jairo Castillo		(substituted on) 32'
MF	23	Mauricio Molina	(yellow card) 90+4'	(substituted on) 88'
Manager:
Francisco Maturana
