= 2001 Copa América Group C =

Group C of the 2001 Copa América was one of the three groups of competing nations in the 2001 Copa América. It comprised Bolivia, Costa Rica, Honduras, and Uruguay. Costa Rica and Honduras were invited to replace Argentina and Canada, who were originally drawn into this group but withdrew shortly before the start of the tournament. Group play ran from 13 to 19 July 2001.

Costa Rica won the group and faced Uruguay—the third-placed team of the same group and best-ranked third-placed team overall—in the quarter-finals. Honduras finished second and faced Brazil, the winners of Group B, in the quarter-finals. Bolivia finished fourth in the group, and were eliminated from the tournament.

== Standings ==
Team	Pld	W	D	L	GF	GA	GD	Pts
Costa Rica	3	2	1	0	6	1	+5	7
Honduras	3	2	0	1	3	1	+2	6
Uruguay	3	1	1	1	2	2	0	4
Bolivia	3	0	0	3	0	7	−7	0

Teams that advanced to the quarter-finals
- Group winners
- Group runners-up
- Best two third-placed teams among all groups

All times are in local, Colombia Time (UTC−05:00).

== Matches ==
=== Bolivia vs Uruguay ===
13 July 2001
18:00

Bolivia	0–1	Uruguay
	Report	Chevantón 60'

Estadio Atanasio Girardot, Medellín
Attendance: 38,000
Referee: Mauricio Navarro (Canada)

Bolivia	Uruguay

GK	1	Carlos Erwin Arias
DF	7	Luis Gatty Ribeiro
DF	17	Eduardo Jiguchi
DF	3	Marco Sandy
DF	16	Ronald Raldes
DF	15	Lorgio Álvarez	(yellow card) 18'
MF	8	Franz Calustro	(yellow card) 66'
MF	10	Julio César Baldivieso	(yellow card) 23'
MF	18	Limberg Gutiérrez		(substituted off) 73'
FW	9	Joaquín Botero
FW	19	Milton Coimbra		(substituted off) 73'
Substitutions:
FW	11	Líder Paz		(substituted in) 73'
MF	14	Ronald García		(substituted in) 73'
Manager:
Carlos Aragonés

GK	1	Gustavo Munúa
DF	4	Carlos Díaz
DF	3	Gonzalo Sorondo
DF	2	Joe Bizera
DF	6	Pablo Lima	(yellow card) 83'
MF	7	Christian Callejas
MF	5	Diego Pérez
MF	8	Andrés Martínez	(yellow card) 12'	(substituted off) 56'
MF	9	Rodrigo Lemos		(substituted off) 63'
FW	19	Javier Chevantón		(substituted off) 79'
FW	20	Richard Morales
Substitutions:
DF	16	Jorge Anchén		(substituted in) 56'
MF	21	Sebastián Eguren		(substituted in) 63'
FW	15	Carlos María Morales		(substituted in) 79'
Manager:
Víctor Púa

=== Honduras vs Costa Rica ===
13 July 2001
20:15

Honduras	0–1	Costa Rica
	Report	Wanchope 63'

Estadio Atanasio Girardot, Medellín
Attendance: 35,000
Referee: Mario Sánchez (Chile)

Honduras	Costa Rica

GK	22	Noel Valladares
DF	5	Milton Reyes		(substituted off) 23'
DF	17	Carlos Güity
DF	24	Ninrrol Medina
DF	3	David Cárcamo
MF	6	Óscar Lagos	(yellow card) 83'
MF	19	Danilo Turcios
MF	13	Robel Bernárdez
MF	20	Amado Guevara
FW	7	David Suazo		(substituted off) 14'
FW	18	Saúl Martínez		(substituted off) 64'
Substitutions:
FW	8	Marvin Brown		(substituted in) 14'
DF	21	Limber Pérez		(substituted in) 23'
MF	14	Mario César Rodríguez		(substituted in) 64'
Manager:
Ramón Maradiaga

GK	1	Erick Lonnis
DF	2	Jervis Drummond
DF	3	Luis Marín
DF	21	Reynaldo Parks	(yellow card) 75'
DF	5	Gilberto Martínez
MF	10	Walter Centeno		(substituted off) 61'
MF	8	Mauricio Solís
MF	16	Steven Bryce		(substituted off) 71'
MF	22	Carlos Castro
FW	9	Paulo Wanchope
FW	7	Rolando Fonseca		(substituted off) 61'
Substitutions:
FW	11	Rónald Gómez		(substituted in) 61'
MF	17	Hernán Medford		(substituted in) 61'
MF	19	Rodrigo Cordero		(substituted in) 71'
Manager:
Alexandre Guimarães

=== Uruguay vs Costa Rica ===
16 July 2001
18:00

Uruguay	1–1	Costa Rica
C. Morales 53'	Report	Wanchope 28'

Estadio Atanasio Girardot, Medellín
Attendance: 20,000
Referee: Carlos Eugênio Simon (Brazil)

Uruguay	Costa Rica

GK	1	Gustavo Munúa
DF	4	Carlos Díaz
DF	3	Gonzalo Sorondo	(yellow card) 78'
DF	2	Joe Bizera
DF	14	Alejandro Curbelo
MF	7	Christian Callejas	(yellow card) 55'
MF	5	Diego Pérez
MF	8	Andrés Martínez		(substituted off) 51'
MF	9	Rodrigo Lemos		(substituted off) 58'
FW	15	Carlos María Morales		(substituted off) 88'
FW	20	Richard Morales
Substitutions:
DF	16	Jorge Anchén		(substituted in) 51'
MF	21	Sebastián Eguren		(substituted in) 58'
DF	13	Carlos Gutiérrez		(substituted in) 88'
Manager:
Víctor Púa

GK	1	Erick Lonnis
DF	2	Jervis Drummond
DF	3	Luis Marín
DF	21	Reynaldo Parks
DF	5	Gilberto Martínez
MF	10	Walter Centeno
MF	8	Mauricio Solís
MF	17	Hernán Medford		(substituted off) 57'
MF	22	Carlos Castro
FW	9	Paulo Wanchope	(yellow card) 55'
FW	11	Rónald Gómez	(yellow card) 53'	(substituted off) 76'
Substitutions:
FW	7	Rolando Fonseca		(substituted in) 57'
MF	16	Steven Bryce		(substituted in) 76'
Manager:
Alexandre Guimarães

=== Honduras vs Bolivia ===
16 July 2001
20:15

Honduras	2–0	Bolivia
Guevara 53', 68'	Report

Estadio Atanasio Girardot, Medellín
Attendance: 25,000
Referee: John Toro Rendón (Colombia)

Honduras	Bolivia

GK	22	Noel Valladares
DF	24	Ninrrol Medina
DF	3	David Cárcamo
DF	4	Samuel Caballero
DF	17	Carlos Güity		(substituted off) 29'
MF	15	Ricky García
MF	6	Óscar Lagos	(yellow card) 51'	(substituted off) 87'
MF	19	Danilo Turcios		(substituted off) 64'
MF	20	Amado Guevara
MF	10	Julio César de León
FW	18	Saúl Martínez
Substitutions:
DF	21	Limber Pérez		(substituted in) 29'
MF	14	Mario César Rodríguez		(substituted in) 64'
MF	13	Robel Bernárdez		(substituted in) 87'
Manager:
Ramón Maradiaga

GK	1	Carlos Erwin Arias
DF	7	Luis Gatty Ribeiro
DF	17	Eduardo Jiguchi
DF	3	Marco Sandy	(red card) 73'
DF	15	Lorgio Álvarez
DF	16	Ronald Raldes		(substituted off) 46'
MF	8	Franz Calustro
MF	10	Julio César Baldivieso		(substituted off) 78'
MF	14	Ronald García
FW	9	Joaquín Botero
FW	11	Líder Paz		(substituted off) 66'
Substitutions:
MF	18	Limberg Gutiérrez	(yellow card) 76'	(substituted in) 46'
FW	19	Milton Coimbra	(red card) 81'	(substituted in) 66'
DF	5	Marcelo Carballo		(substituted in) 78'
Manager:
Carlos Aragonés

=== Bolivia vs Costa Rica ===
19 July 2001
18:00

Bolivia	0–4	Costa Rica
	Report	Wanchope 45', 71'; Bryce 63'; Fonseca 84'

Estadio Atanasio Girardot, Medellín
Attendance: 25,000
Referee: Luis Solórzano (Venezuela)

Bolivia	Costa Rica

GK	1	Carlos Erwin Arias
DF	7	Luis Gatty Ribeiro
DF	16	Ronald Raldes
DF	17	Eduardo Jiguchi	(yellow card) 38'
DF	5	Marcelo Carballo
DF	4	Percy Colque		(substituted off) 46'
MF	6	Raúl Justiniano	(yellow card) 25'
MF	10	Julio César Baldivieso
MF	18	Limberg Gutiérrez
FW	22	Roger Suárez	(yellow card) 85'
FW	9	Joaquín Botero
Substitutions:
DF	15	Lorgio Álvarez		(substituted in) 46'
Manager:
Carlos Aragonés

GK	23	Ricardo González
DF	2	Jervis Drummond
DF	12	Robert Arias
DF	3	Luis Marín
DF	14	Austin Berry
MF	10	Walter Centeno
MF	15	Harold Wallace
MF	19	Rodrigo Cordero	(yellow card) 9'
FW	11	Rónald Gómez		(substituted off) 61'
FW	7	Rolando Fonseca
FW	9	Paulo Wanchope		(substituted off) 72'
Substitutions:
MF	16	Steven Bryce		(substituted in) 61'
MF	8	Mauricio Solís		(substituted in) 72'
Manager:
Alexandre Guimarães

=== Honduras vs Uruguay ===
19 July 2001
20:15

Honduras	1–0	Uruguay
Guevara 86'	Report

Estadio Atanasio Girardot, Medellín
Attendance: 35,000
Referee: Roger Zambrano (Ecuador)

Honduras	Uruguay

GK	22	Noel Valladares
DF	24	Ninrrol Medina
DF	3	David Cárcamo
DF	4	Samuel Caballero	(yellow card) 26'
DF	17	Carlos Güity	(yellow card) 57'
MF	14	Mario César Rodríguez		(substituted off) 86'
MF	15	Ricky García
MF	20	Amado Guevara
MF	10	Julio César de León	(yellow card) 89'
MF	19	Danilo Turcios
FW	18	Saúl Martínez
Substitutions:
FW	8	Marvin Brown		(substituted in) 86'
Manager:
Ramón Maradiaga

GK	12	Adrián Berbia
DF	4	Carlos Díaz
DF	2	Joe Bizera	(red card) 52'
DF	14	Alejandro Curbelo	(yellow card) 10'
DF	13	Carlos Gutiérrez
MF	8	Andrés Martínez		(substituted off) 70'
MF	9	Rodrigo Lemos		(substituted off) 82'
MF	21	Sebastián Eguren	(red card) 80'
MF	22	Claudio Dadómo
FW	15	Carlos María Morales
FW	11	Walter Guglielmone		(substituted off) 67'
Substitutions:
FW	20	Richard Morales		(substituted in) 67'
MF	5	Diego Pérez		(substituted in) 70'
DF	16	Jorge Anchén		(substituted in) 82'
Manager:
Víctor Púa
