= 2001 Copa América final =

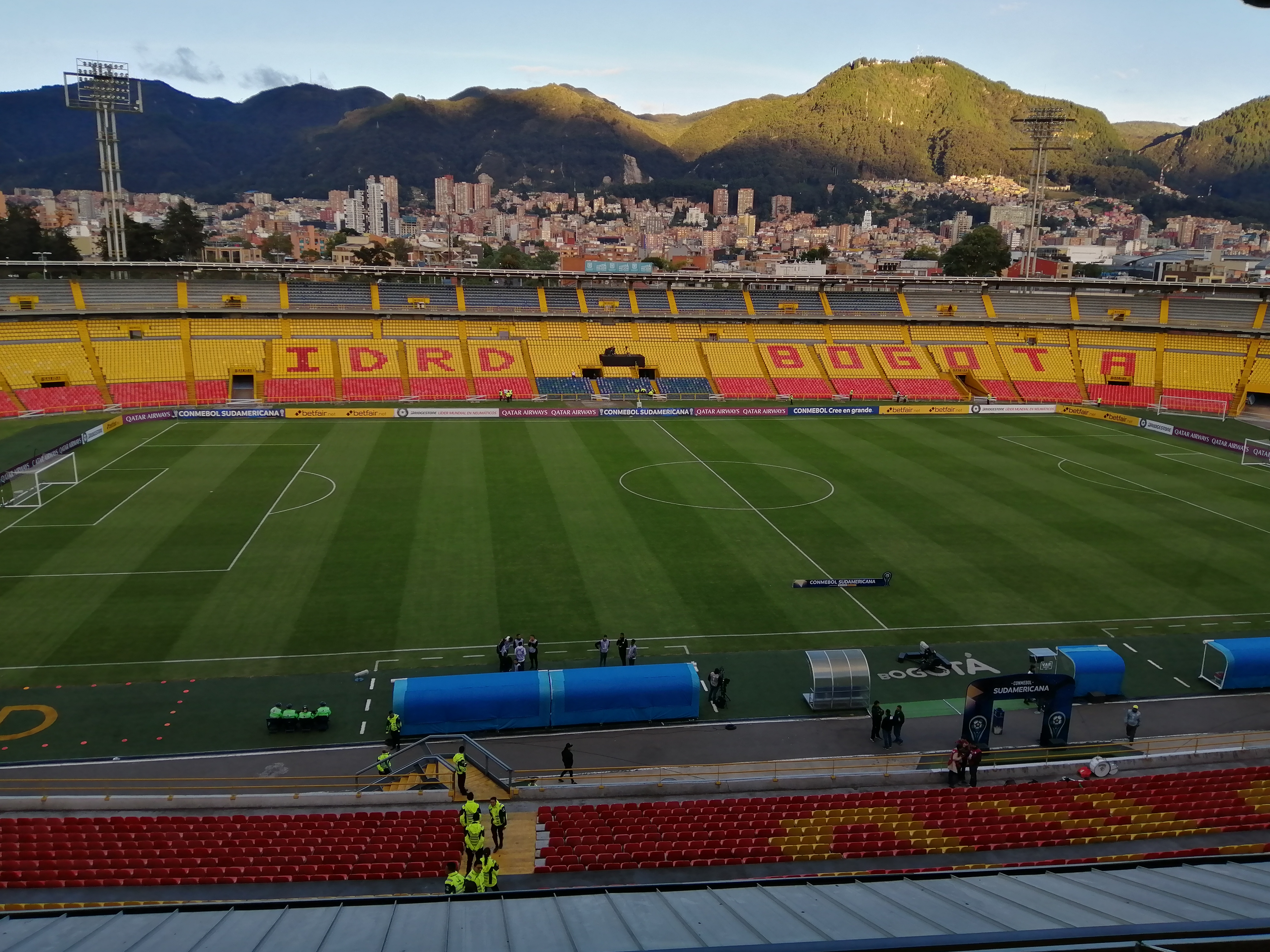
- Estadio El Campín hosted the final
- Event: 2001 Copa América
Mexico	Colombia
(Mexico)	(Colombia)
0	1
- Date: 29 July 2001
- Venue: Estadio El Campín, Bogotá
- Referee: Ubaldo Aquino (Paraguay)
- Attendance: 47,000
- Weather: Scattered clouds 16 °C (61 °F)

The 2001 Copa América final was the final match of the 2001 Copa América. It was held on 29 July 2001 in Bogotá. Colombia won the match 1–0 against Mexico, becoming the seventh of sixteen participant countries to win the Copa América.

== Match details ==
29 July 2001
16:30

Mexico	0–1	Colombia
	Report	I. Córdoba 65'

Estadio El Campín, Bogotá
Attendance: 47,000
Referee: Ubaldo Aquino (Paraguay)

Mexico	Colombia

GK	12	Óscar Pérez
CB	2	Alberto Rodríguez		(substituted off) 74'
CB	3	Heriberto Morales
CB	6	Gerardo Torrado	(yellow card) 22' (yellow-red card) 90+4'
RM	7	Octavio Valdez
CM	13	Sigifredo Mercado
CM	15	Juan Pablo Rodríguez	(red card) 79'
LM	20	Ramón Morales	(yellow card) 70'
RF	21	Jesús Arellano (c)		(substituted off) 59'
CF	9	Jared Borgetti
LF	18	Johan Rodríguez		(substituted off) 67'
Substitutions:
MF	10	Cesáreo Victorino		(substituted on) 59'
MF	11	Daniel Osorno		(substituted on) 67'
MF	19	Miguel Zepeda		(substituted on) 74'
Manager:
Javier Aguirre

GK	1	Óscar Córdoba
RB	14	Iván López
CB	2	Iván Córdoba (c)
CB	3	Mario Yepes
LB	20	Gerardo Bedoya	(yellow card) 20'
CM	19	Freddy Grisales
CM	6	Fabián Vargas	(yellow card) 29'
CM	17	Juan Carlos Ramírez
AM	24	Giovanni Hernández		(substituted off) 88'
CF	15	Elkin Murillo
CF	10	Víctor Aristizábal		(substituted off) 32'
Substitutions:
FW	18	Jairo Castillo		(substituted on) 32'
MF	23	Mauricio Molina	(yellow card) 90+4'	(substituted on) 88'
Manager:
Francisco Maturana

Assistant referees:
Miguel Giacomuzzi (Paraguay)
Claudio Rossi (Argentina)
