= Vidrio =

Vidrio is a Spanish surname. Notable people with the surname include:

- Jacinda Vidrio, a fictional character in the TV series Once Upon a Time
- Manuel Vidrio (born 1972), Mexican footballer
- Néstor Vidrio (born 1989), Mexican footballer
