= Iván López =

Iván López may refer to:

- Iván López (actor) (born 1980), Colombian television actor
- Iván López Álvarez (born 1994), Spanish footballer
- Iván López (footballer, born 1978), Colombian defender
- Iván López (footballer, born 1990), Honduran midfielder
- Iván López (footballer, born 1993), Spanish defender
- Iván López (footballer, born 1996), Argentine goalkeeper
- Iván López (footballer, born 1999), Mexican forward
- Iván López Reynoso (born 1990), Mexican musician and conductor
- Iván López (runner) (born 1990), Chilean middle-distance runner
- Iván López (singer) (born 1985), Mexican reality show singer
- Iván López (swimmer) (born 1984), Mexican swimmer
- Ivan A. Lopez-Lopez, Puerto Rican perpetrator of the 2014 Fort Hood shootings
- Iván López, Mexican mixed martial arts fighter, see WEC 40

== See also ==
- Ivan (disambiguation)
- López (surname)
