= Hesler Phillips =

Honduran footballer (born 1978)

Personal information
- Full name: Hesler Enrique Phillips Baca
- Date of birth: 18 November 1978 (age 47)
- Place of birth: San Lorenzo, Honduras
- Position: Striker

Senior career*
Years	Team	Apps	(Gls)
1998–2001	Universidad		
2002–2003	Victoria		
2004	Universidad		
2006–2007	Platense		

International career
1999–2001	Honduras	6	(1)
- * Club domestic league appearances and goals

Hesler Enrique Phillips Baca (born 18 November 1978) is a Honduran former football player.

== Club career ==
Phillips played for Universidad and Victoria with whom he got relegated in 2003. He returned to Universidad and later joined Platense.

== International career ==
Phillips was part of the Honduras Olympic squad which qualified for the Summer Olympics for the first time in 2000. He did however not make the Olympic Games roster.

He made his senior debut for Honduras in a May 1999 friendly match against Haiti and has earned a total of 6 caps, scoring 1 goal. He was a non-playing squad member at the 2000 CONCACAF Gold Cup and played at the 2001 Copa América.

His final international was a July 2001 Copa América match against Uruguay.

=== International goals ===
Scores and results list Honduras' goal tally first.

N.	Date	Venue	Opponent	Score	Result	Competition
1.	17 November 1999	Imperio del Sol Naciente, Tegucigalpa, Honduras	Trinidad and Tobago	3–1	3–2	Friendly match
