= Carlos Erwin Arias =

Bolivian footballer (born 1980)

Personal information
- Full name: Carlos Erwin Arias Égüez
- Date of birth: 18 February 1980 (age 46)
- Place of birth: Portachuelo, Bolivia
- Height: 1.83 m (6 ft 0 in)
- Position: Goalkeeper

Senior career*
Years	Team	Apps	(Gls)
1998–2007	Blooming	153	(0)
2003–2005	→ The Strongest (loan)	37	(0)
2008–2010	Bolívar	75	(0)
2010–2011	Maccabi Netanya	34	(0)
2011–2012	Córdoba	7	(0)
2012–2015	Oriente Petrolero	83	(0)
2016	Guabirá	16	(0)
2017	Sport Boys	11	(0)

International career
2001–2013	Bolivia	41	(0)
- * Club domestic league appearances and goals as of 3 May 2018

Carlos Erwin Arias Égüez (born 27 April 1980 in Portachuelo, Santa Cruz) is a Bolivian former goalkeeper. He last played for Sport Boys Warnes.

== Club career ==
On 4 July 2010, Arias signed a 3-seasons' contract with Israeli Maccabi Netanya, due to his 20-game suspension in Bolivia.

On 4 August 2011, Arias signed for Spanish Segunda side Córdoba CF.

== National team ==
Arias has been capped for Bolivia in 41 games. Among the most important tournaments he has participated in is the Copa América 2001 and Copa América 2011.

== Honours ==
Blooming

- Bolivian League: 1998, 1999

The Strongest

- Bolivian League: 2003 (A), 2003 (C)

Bolívar

- Bolivian League: 2009 (A)

Individual

- Sport 5 Goalkeeper of the Season: 2010–11
