= Iván López (footballer, born 1978) =

Colombian footballer

Personal information
- Full name: Iván Leonardo López Licht
- Date of birth: 13 May 1978 (age 48)
- Place of birth: Bogotá, Colombia
- Height: 1.75 m (5 ft 9 in)
- Position: Defender

Youth career
- 1995–1998: Independiente Santa Fe

Senior career*
Years	Team	Apps	(Gls)
1998–2002	Independiente Santa Fe	95	(6)
2002–2003	América de Cali	21	(2)
2003–2004	Independiente Santa Fe	21	(2)
2005–2006	Millonarios Fútbol Club	24	(0)
2006	Deportivo Azogues	4	(1)
2009	Atlético Bucaramanga	0	(0)
Total		165	(11)

International career
1999–2003	Colombia	11	(0)
- * Club domestic league appearances and goals

Iván Leonardo López Licht (born 13 May 1978) is a former Colombian footballer. He primarily played as a central defender, and was called El Centre de oro, "the golden centre", although he also played as a right wingback. López was projected to be a great player, but his career was frustrated and eventually ended early by injuries. He mostly played at Colombian clubs, and is most known for his performances for Independiente Santa Fe. As an international player for Colombia he was part of the squad that won the 2001 Copa América.

== Club career ==
López spent his youth career at Independiente Santa Fe of Bogotá, making his professional debut for them in 1998. During his time there, he was named Bogotá Sportsman of the Year several times, and selected for the national team. In 2002, he moved to América de Cali, but he returned to Santa Fe the next year. In 2005, he started playing for Millonarios Fútbol Club. Toward the end of the season, he was injured badly enough that he could not play in the next season.

Later in the 2006 season, López signed with the second-division Ecuadorean club Deportivo Azogues to try to revive his career, but after only four games he had to withdraw due to another injury. Three years later in 2009, he tried to return to his professional career at Atlético Bucaramanga, but never played a game for the team.

== International career ==
As an international player, he made 11 caps for Colombia. He made his international debut in 1999, and was part of the squad that came second in the 2000 CONCACAF Gold Cup. A free kick he took in the final of the Copa América in 2001 was converted into a goal by Iván Córdoba, giving Colombia its first title in the cup.
