= Eduardo Jiguchi =

Bolivian footballer (born 1970)

Personal information
- Full name: Eduardo Jiguchi Machicado
- Date of birth: August 24, 1970 (age 56)
- Place of birth: Mineros, Santa Cruz, Bolivia
- Height: 1.77 m (5 ft 10 in)
- Position: Defender

Senior career*
Years	Team	Apps	(Gls)
1988–1991	Oriente Petrolero		
1992–1999	Bolívar	256	(19)
2000	Mariscal Braun	29	(4)
2001–2002	Wilstermann	37	(5)
2003–2004	The Strongest	59	(4)
2005	Aurora	22	(0)
2006	Destroyers	18	(1)
2007	San José	11	(0)

International career
1991–2002	Bolivia	18	(0)
- * Club domestic league appearances and goals

Eduardo Jiguchi Machicado (born August 24, 1970) is a retired football defender from Bolivia, who played his entire career in the Liga de Fútbol Profesional Boliviano.

== International career ==
He also played for the Bolivia national team from 1991 to 2002, representing his country in 2 FIFA World Cup qualification matches and at the 1987 FIFA U-16 World Championship.
