= Manuel Vidrio =

Mexican footballer and coach (born 1972)

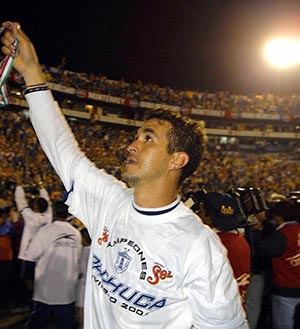
- Vidrio in 2001

Personal information
- Full name: Manuel Vidrio Solís
- Date of birth: 23 August 1972 (age 54)
- Place of birth: Teocuitatlán de Corona, Mexico
- Height: 1.84 m (6 ft 1/2 in)
- Position: Centre-back

Senior career*
Years	Team	Apps	(Gls)
1991–1996	Guadalajara	144	(7)
1996–1997	Toluca	24	(1)
1997–1998	Tecos	34	(1)
1999–2002	Pachuca	122	(9)
2002–2003	Osasuna	5	(1)
2003–2005	Pachuca	71	(2)
2006	Veracruz	5	(0)

International career
1992	Mexico Olympic	3	(0)
1993–2002	Mexico	34	(1)

Managerial career
- 2007–2008: Universidad del Fútbol
- 2008–2009: Alto Rendimiento Tuzo
- 2009–2010: Mexico (Assistant)
- 2010: Zaragoza (Assistant)
- 2012: Galeana Morelos
- 2013: Tecos
Medal record
Representing Mexico
Runner-up	Copa America	2001
- * Club domestic league appearances and goals

Manuel Vidrio Solís (born 23 August 1972) is a Mexican former professional footballer who played as a centre-back.

He has been capped for the Mexico national team, including four games at the 2002 FIFA World Cup. He was also part of the Mexico squad at the 1992 Summer Olympics.

A rugged and combative central defender, Vidrio played for Chivas until 1996. He then spent two seasons at Toluca and three at UAG Tecos before joining Pachuca, where he became one of the most effective defenders in Mexico. Lining up in a tough back line that also included Mexico internationales Alberto Rodriguez and Octavio Valdez, later joined by Francisco Gabriel de Anda, Vidrio helped Pachuca to its first national professional title in the Invierno 1999 season. The team went on to win the Invierno 2001 and Apertura 2003 championships as well. Vidrio retired after a short stint with Veracruz in 2006.

Although he earned a number of caps in the mid-1990s, beginning in 1993, Vidrio's international career did not take off until the appointment of Pachuca coach Javier Aguirre as Mexican national coach in 2001. Vidrio was installed in the starting lineup for Aguirre's first match, a 1–0 win over the United States, and he remained a fixture in the first team through the qualifiers, the Copa America, and the World Cup. His final cap was also against the United States, in the 2–0 second-round loss in Jeonju that eliminated Mexico from the tournament and signaled the end of Aguirre's first spell in command of the national team.

== Personal life ==
He and his wife Rosany Sahagun, have 3 daughters.

== Career statistics ==
=== International goals ===
No.	Date	Venue	Opponent	Score	Result	Competition
1.	August 23, 2001	Veracruz, Mexico	Liberia	5–4	Win	Friendly

== Honours ==
Pachuca

- Mexican Primera División: Invierno 1999, Invierno 2001, Apertura 2003
- CONCACAF Champions' Cup: 2002
