= Franz Calustro =

Bolivian footballer (born 1974)

Personal information
- Full name: Álvaro Franz Calustro Cárdenas
- Date of birth: March 9, 1974 (age 52)
- Place of birth: Cochabamba, Bolivia
- Height: 1.74 m (5 ft 8 1/2 in)
- Position: Midfielder

Senior career*
Years	Team	Apps	(Gls)
1995	Ciclón de Tarija		
1996–1998	Independiente Petrolero		
1999–2000	Unión Central	58	(13)
2001	Oriente Petrolero	47	(5)
2002	Unión Central	40	(2)
2003–2005	Wilstermann	37	(1)
2006	Universitario	28	(3)
2007	Real Potosí	28	(1)
2008	Universitario	19	(0)
2009	Real Mamoré	34	(2)

International career^{‡}
1999–2003	Bolivia	9	(0)
- * Club domestic league appearances and goals as of September 18, 2009 ‡ National team caps and goals as of April 15, 2008

Álvaro Franz Calustro Cárdenas (born March 9, 1974) is a retired Bolivian football midfielder.

== International career ==
Calustro obtained a total number of nine caps for the Bolivia national football team during his career. He was a member of the national squad competing at the 2001 Copa América.
