= Marcelo Carballo =

Bolivian footballer (born 1974)

Personal information
- Full name: Marcelo Antonio Carballo Cadima
- Date of birth: December 7, 1974 (age 51)
- Place of birth: Cochabamba, Bolivia
- Height: 1.75 m (5 ft 9 in)
- Position: Defender

Senior career*
Years	Team	Apps	(Gls)
1993–2001	Wilstermann	219	(4)
2002–2004	The Strongest	81	(3)
2005–2009	Wilstermann	120	(4)

International career
1997–2004	Bolivia	11	(1)
- * Club domestic league appearances and goals as of September 18, 2009

Marcelo Antonio Carballo Cadima (born December 7, 1974, in Cochabamba) is a retired Bolivian footballer who played as a defender.

== Club career ==
Carballo spent most of his career for Wilstermann but also played for The Strongest from 2002 and 2004.

== International career ==
He earned 11 caps and scored one goal for Bolivia. He also represented his country in six FIFA World Cup qualification matches.
