= Mineros, Bolivia =

Mineros
- City
- Location within Bolivia
- Coordinates: 17°07′04″S 63°13′59″W
- Country: Bolivia
- Department: Santa Cruz Department
- Province: Obispo Santistevan Province
- Municipality: Mineros Municipality

Population (2012)
  - Total: 18,340
- Time zone: UTC-4 (BOT)

Plaza de Minero

Mineros is a city of Bolivia, capital of the Mineros Municipality of the Santa Cruz Department, 83 km north of the city of Santa Cruz de la Sierra. Due to the policy of the 1960s that forced the indigenous people of the Altiplano to immigrate, 23.3% of the population knows how to speak Quechua.

== Population ==
Year	Population	Source
1976	6,184	Census of 1976
1992	11,181	Census of 1992
2001	13,283	Census of 2001
2012	18,340	Census of 2012

== Climate ==
Climate data for Mineros, elevation 245 m (804 ft), (1979–2013)
Month	Jan	Feb	Mar	Apr	May	Jun	Jul	Aug	Sep	Oct	Nov	Dec	Year
Record high °C (°F)	41.0 (105.8)	39.0 (102.2)	39.0 (102.2)	37.2 (99.0)	36.0 (96.8)	35.0 (95.0)	35.0 (95.0)	38.0 (100.4)	41.0 (105.8)	40.0 (104.0)	41.5 (106.7)	40.0 (104.0)	41.5 (106.7)
Mean daily maximum °C (°F)	32.8 (91.0)	32.1 (89.8)	32.2 (90.0)	30.9 (87.6)	27.9 (82.2)	26.7 (80.1)	27.1 (80.8)	29.6 (85.3)	30.8 (87.4)	32.3 (90.1)	32.7 (90.9)	32.2 (90.0)	30.6 (87.1)
Daily mean °C (°F)	27.3 (81.1)	26.8 (80.2)	26.6 (79.9)	25.1 (77.2)	22.3 (72.1)	21.0 (69.8)	20.5 (68.9)	22.4 (72.3)	23.9 (75.0)	25.8 (78.4)	26.6 (79.9)	26.9 (80.4)	24.6 (76.3)
Mean daily minimum °C (°F)	21.8 (71.2)	21.4 (70.5)	21.1 (70.0)	19.2 (66.6)	16.6 (61.9)	15.3 (59.5)	14.0 (57.2)	15.3 (59.5)	17.1 (62.8)	19.3 (66.7)	20.4 (68.7)	21.5 (70.7)	18.6 (65.4)
Record low °C (°F)	12.8 (55.0)	12.8 (55.0)	13.0 (55.4)	10.4 (50.7)	6.0 (42.8)	4.0 (39.2)	4.5 (40.1)	6.1 (43.0)	7.7 (45.9)	10.4 (50.7)	12.0 (53.6)	12.0 (53.6)	4.0 (39.2)
Average precipitation mm (inches)	230.1 (9.06)	187.9 (7.40)	136.0 (5.35)	102.9 (4.05)	85.2 (3.35)	80.4 (3.17)	41.8 (1.65)	47.4 (1.87)	73.2 (2.88)	104.6 (4.12)	185.6 (7.31)	210.4 (8.28)	1,485.5 (58.49)
Average precipitation days	14.1	12.2	11.8	8.5	8.5	6.5	4.7	4.0	5.8	7.9	10.0	13.4	107.4
Average relative humidity (%)	77.4	77.2	76.1	72.1	70.8	69.9	66.2	63.8	63.7	66.0	69.0	76.2	70.7
Source: Servicio Nacional de Meteorología e Hidrología de Bolivia
