= Limber Pérez =

Honduran footballer (born 1976)

Personal information
- Full name: Limber Omar Pérez Mauricio
- Date of birth: July 26, 1976 (age 50)
- Place of birth: Iriona, Honduras
- Height: 1.67 m (5 ft 6 in)
- Position: Defender

Senior career*
Years	Team	Apps	(Gls)
1996–1998	Marathón		
1998–1999	Platense		(0)
1999–2002	Universidad		
2002–2003	Olimpia		
2003–2005	Real España		
2005–2007	Motagua		

International career^{‡}
2001–2002	Honduras	9	(0)
- * Club domestic league appearances and goals as of 2005 ‡ National team caps and goals as of 6 April 2013

Limber Omar Pérez Mauricio (born July 26, 1976), his first name also spelled Limbert or Limberth, is a retired Honduran football defender.

== Club career ==
He is one of few players who have played for Honduras' Big Four: Olimpia, Marathón, Real España and F.C. Motagua.

== International career ==
Pérez made his debut for Honduras in a July 2001 friendly match against Ecuador and has earned a total of 9 caps, scoring no goals. He has represented his country in 1 FIFA World Cup qualification match and was a member of the national squad that beat Brazil in Copa América 2001 in Colombia.

His final international was a March 2002 friendly match against the United States.
