= Adrián Berbia =

Uruguayan footballer (born 1977)

Personal information
- Full name: Adrián Berbia Pose
- Date of birth: 12 October 1977 (age 49)
- Place of birth: Montevideo, Uruguay
- Height: 1.89 m (6 ft 2 in)
- Position: Goalkeeper

Team information
- Current team: Boston River
- Number: 1

Senior career*
Years	Team	Apps	(Gls)
1996–2000	Bella Vista	57	(0)
2000–2003	Peñarol	59	(0)
2003–2004	Liverpool Montevideo	23	(0)
2005	Olimpia Asunción	3	(0)
2005–2006	Cerro	13	(0)
2006	O'Higgins	5	(0)
2007	Peñarol	3	(0)
2007	Juventud Las Piedras	14	(0)
2008	América de Cali	48	(0)
2009–2010	Junior Barranquilla	36	(0)
2010	Fénix	2	(0)
2011–2012	Real Cartagena	32	(0)
2012	Miramar Misiones	6	(0)
2012–2013	Juventud Las Piedras	28	(0)
2013–2014	Miramar Misiones	8	(0)
2015–	Boston River	0	(0)

International career
2001	Uruguay	2	(0)
- * Club domestic league appearances and goals as of 11:58, 21 November 2013 (UTC)

Adrián Berbia Pose (born 12 October 1977 in Montevideo) is a former Uruguayan goalkeeper who played for Boston River in the Uruguayan Primera División.

== Career ==
Berbia signed with Uruguayan Primera B club Boston River in 2015 after being out of contract for 6 months. After the 2015–16 season, the club was promoted to the Primera División and, following a successful first season in the Primera, participated in the 2017 Copa Sudamericana.

== International career ==
Berbia has made two appearances for the senior, Uruguay national football team, both at the Copa América 2001.
