= Rodrigo Cordero =

Costa Rican footballer (born 1973)

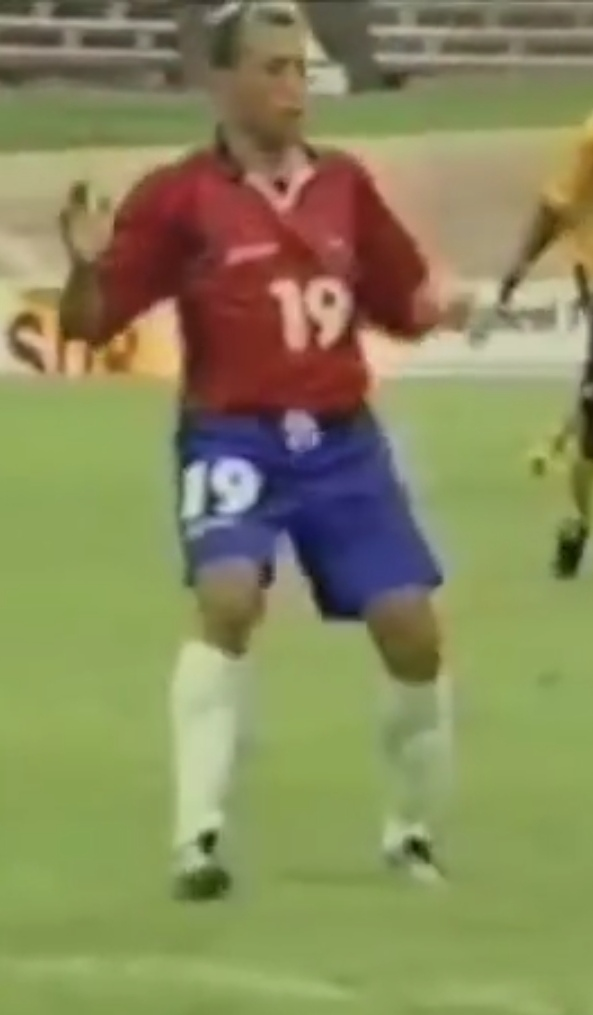
- Rodrigo Cordero (2001)

Personal information
- Full name: Rodrigo Antonio Cordero Solano
- Date of birth: 4 December 1973 (age 52)
- Place of birth: Moravia, Costa Rica
- Height: 1.70 m (5 ft 7 in)
- Position: Midfielder

Senior career*
Years	Team	Apps	(Gls)
1994–1995	Municipal Puriscal		(7)
1995–1997	Alajuelense		
1997	Carmelita		
1998–2004	Herediano		
2003	Cartaginés		
2004–2005	Brujas	23	(0)
2005–2006	Cartaginés	28	(0)
2006–2007	Pérez Zeledón	26	(0)
2007–2008	Puntarenas	21	(1)
2008–2010	Ramonense	51	(3)
2010–2011	Barrio Mexico		

International career^{‡}
2000–2004	Costa Rica	34	(1)
- * Club domestic league appearances and goals as of October 16, 2008 ‡ National team caps and goals as of October 16, 2008

Rodrigo Antonio Cordero Solano (born 4 December 1973) is a retired Costa Rican professional footballer.

== Club career ==
Cordero made his debut on 4 September 1994 for second division outfit Municipal Puriscal against Uruguay de Coronado.

Nicknamed Rocky, he later played for Alajuelense, Herediano, Brujas, Cartaginés, Pérez Zeledón, Puntarenas, Ramonense before moving to second division side Barrio Mexico in summer 2010.

== International career ==
Cordero made his debut for Costa Rica in a friendly match against Paraguay on June 21, 2000 and has made 34 appearances for the Costa Rica national football team, including 14 qualifying matches for the 2002 FIFA World Cup. He represented his country at the 2003 UNCAF Nations Cup as well as at the 2001 Copa América and was a non-playing squad member at the 2002 World Cup.

His final international was a June 2004 friendly against Nicaragua.

== Career statistics ==
=== International goals ===
Scores and results list. Costa Rica's goal tally first.

#	Date	Venue	Opponent	Score	Result	Competition
1.	February 28, 2001	Estadio Ricardo Saprissa, San José, Costa Rica	Honduras	2–2	2–2	World Cup qualifier
