= Heriberto Morales =

Mexican footballer (born 1975)

Personal information
- Full name: Heriberto Ramón Morales Cortés
- Date of birth: March 10, 1975 (age 51)
- Place of birth: Morelia, Michoacán, Mexico
- Height: 1.82 m (6 ft 0 in)
- Position: Defender

Senior career*
Years	Team	Apps	(Gls)
1995–2002	Morelia	242	(5)
1997–1998	→ Monterrey (loan)	32	(1)
2003	Guadalajara	34	(0)
2004–2007	Chiapas	80	(1)

International career
2000–2002	Mexico	13	(0)
Medal record
Representing Mexico
Runner-up	Copa America	2001
- * Club domestic league appearances and goals

Heriberto Ramón Morales Cortés (born 10 March 1975) is a Mexican former footballer who played as a defender.

Morales began his career with Monarcas Morelia in the 1995–96 season, playing as a central or left-sided defender. By 1996, he had become a starter for the majority of Morelia's matches, and he stayed with the club through 2002, winning the Invierno 2000 championship in the process. In 2003, he moved to Chivas, playing one year there, and he spent his last career years playing for Chiapas. Morales ended his Mexico league top-tier career with Jaguares in 2007.

He scored the goal in the penalty shootout that won the championship for Morelia against Toluca in 2000.

In addition, Morales earned 12 caps for the Mexico national team. He was called by national coach Javier Aguirre for the 2001 Copa America, appearing in five matches as Mexico advanced to the final. Morales also appeared in three qualifiers for the 2002 FIFA World Cup, scoring an own goal against Jamaica on September 2, 2001 and starting subsequent matches against Trinidad & Tobago and Costa Rica. Although he played in several preparation matches prior to the World Cup, Morales was not included in Aguirre's final 23-man squad.

== Honours ==
Morelia

- Mexican Primera División: Invierno 2000
