= Reynaldo Pineda =

Honduran footballer (born 1978)

Personal information
- Full name: Reynaldo Felipe Pineda García
- Date of birth: 6 August 1978 (age 48)
- Place of birth: San Pedro Sula, Honduras
- Position: Midfielder

Senior career*
Years	Team	Apps	(Gls)
1996–1998	Independiente Villela		
2000–2001	Deportes Savio		(11)
2001–2002	Victoria		
2002–2004	Real España		
2004–2005	Victoria		
2007–2008	Villanueva		
2008–2009	Atletico Gualala		

International career
2000–2001	Honduras	4	(0)
- * Club domestic league appearances and goals

Reynaldo Felipe Pineda García (born 6 August 1978) is a Honduran footballer.

He was a member of the Honduran squad that competed at the 2001 Copa America and the 1999 Panamerican Games in Winnipeg.

== Club career ==
Nicknamed el Chino, Pineda played at Independiente Villela where Chelato Uclés made him debut at his 15 years against Olimpia. He also played for Deportes Savio for whom he still was their third-placed goalscorer by 2009.

He later moved on to Real España where he was going to sign for 5 years more but Club Deportivo Victoria made him a good offer. He passed to Victoria but he had bad relations with the chairman and later left football. He returned and started playing in Liga de Ascenso de Honduras.

In 2009, he won the second division league title with Atletico Gualala.

== International career ==
Pineda made his debut for Honduras in a November 2000 FIFA World Cup qualification match against St Vincent & the Grenadines and has earned a total of 4 caps, scoring no goals. He has represented his country in 1 FIFA World Cup qualification match and played at the 2001 Copa América.

His final international was a July 2001 Copa América match against Uruguay.
