= David Cárcamo =

Honduran footballer (born 1970)

Personal information
- Date of birth: 2 August 1970 (age 56)

International career
Years	Team	Apps	(Gls)
1999–2002	Honduras	12	(0)

David Cárcamo (born 2 August 1970) is a Honduran footballer. He played in twelve matches for the Honduras national football team from 1999 to 2002. He was also part of Honduras's squad for the 2001 Copa América tournament.
