= Sigifredo Mercado =

Mexican footballer (born 1968)

Sigifredo Mercado Sáenz (born 21 December 1968 in Toluca) is a Mexican former professional footballer who played as a midfielder.

He was capped 21 times for the Mexico national team from 1998 to 2002, including three games at the 2002 FIFA World Cup.

== Clubs ==
- (Mexico) Ángeles de Puebla
- (Mexico) Puebla F.C.
- (Mexico) Club Toluca
- (Mexico) Club León
- (Mexico) Puebla F.C.
- (Mexico) Club León
- (Mexico) Club Atlas
- (Mexico) Puebla F.C.

== Honours ==
Mexico

- Copa América runner-up: 2001
