= Robel Bernárdez =

Honduran footballer (born 1972)

Personal information
- Full name: Robel Bernárdez Martínez
- Date of birth: 8 June 1972 (age 54)
- Place of birth: Santa Fe, Honduras
- Height: 1.72 m (5 ft 8 in)
- Position: Midfielder

Senior career*
Years	Team	Apps	(Gls)
1996–1999	Platense		
1999–2003	Motagua		(0)
2003–2004	Marathón		
2004–2006	Universidad		
2007–2008	Atlético Olanchano		

International career
1994–2002	Honduras	33	(0)
- * Club domestic league appearances and goals

Robel Bernárdez Martínez (born 8 June 1972) is a retired Honduran international football midfielder.

== Club career ==
Bernárdez has only played for clubs in his native Honduras, starting with Platense and finishing his career at Atlético Olanchano. In between he played for local giants F.C. Motagua and Marathón as well as for Universidad.

== International career ==
He made his debut for Honduras in a May 1994 Miami Cup match against El Salvador and has earned a total of 31 caps, scoring no goals. He has represented his country in 5 FIFA World Cup qualification matches and played at the 1999 UNCAF Nations Cup as well as at the 1998 CONCACAF Gold Cup and the 2001 Copa América.

His final international was a May 2002 friendly match against Japan.
