= Luis Gatty Ribeiro =

Bolivian footballer (born 1979)

Personal information
- Full name: Luis Gatty Ribeiro Roca
- Date of birth: 1 November 1979 (age 46)
- Place of birth: Cobija, Bolivia
- Height: 1.62 m (5 ft 4 in)
- Position: Defender

Senior career*
Years	Team	Apps	(Gls)
1998–2006	Bolívar	246	(26)
2007–2009	Real Potosí	87	(11)
2010	The Strongest	22	(1)
2011	Guabirá	17	(1)
2014–2015	Universitario Pando	9	(0)
Total		372	(39)

International career
2000–2009	Bolivia	36	(0)
- * Club domestic league appearances and goals

Luis Gatty Ribeiro Roca (born 1 November 1979) is a Bolivian former professional footballer who played as a defender. He played club football for Bolívar, Real Potosí, The Strongest, Guabirá and Universitario Pando, and was capped 36 times by Bolivia.

== Club career ==
He previously played for Bolívar.

== International career ==
He played 36 games for the Bolivia national team between 2000 and 2009 and represented his country in 27 FIFA World Cup qualification matches.
