= Mario César Rodríguez =

Honduran footballer (born 1975)

Personal information
- Full name: Mario César Rodríguez Madrid
- Date of birth: July 31, 1975 (age 51)
- Place of birth: Potrerillos, Honduras
- Height: 1.75 m (5 ft 9 in)
- Position: Midfielder

Senior career*
Years	Team	Apps	(Gls)
1997–2001	Real España	59	(1)
2001	Victoria	13	(1)
2001	Deportes Savio	13	(1)
2002–2003	Universidad	49	(0)
2003	Motagua	8	(0)
2004	Universidad	11	(0)
2004–2005	Platense	34	(3)
2005–2009	Real España	113	(8)
2009–2010	Marathón	27	(0)

International career^{‡}
1999–2009	Honduras	26	(1)
- * Club domestic league appearances and goals as of 2008-09-13 ‡ National team caps and goals as of 2009-02-01

Mario César Rodríguez Madrid (born July 31, 1975) is a retired Honduran football midfielder.

== Club career ==
Rodríguez started his career at Real España and played for several Honduran clubs during his career.

== International career ==
Rodríguez made his debut for Honduras in a March 1999 UNCAF Nations Cup match against Belize and has earned a total of 26 caps, scoring 1 goal. He has represented his country in 1 FIFA World Cup qualification match and played at the 1999 and 2009 UNCAF Nations Cups as well as at the 2007 CONCACAF Gold Cup. He also played at the 2001 Copa América.

His final international was a February 2009 FIFA World Cup qualification match against Costa Rica.

== Career statistics ==
=== International ===
Appearances and goals by national team and year
National team	Year	Apps	Goals
Honduras	1999	4	0
Honduras	2000	–	
Honduras	2001	6	0
Honduras	2002	–	
Honduras	2003	–	
Honduras	2004	–	
Honduras	2005	–	
Honduras	2006	–	
Honduras	2007	10	0
Honduras	2008	–	
Honduras	2009	6	1
Total		26	1

Scores and results list Honduras's goal tally first, score column indicates score after each Rodríguez goal.

List of international goals scored by Mario César Rodríguez
No.	Date	Venue	Opponent	Score	Result	Competition
1	24 January 2009	Estadio Tiburcio Carías Andino, Tegucigalpa, Honduras	Nicaragua	1–0	4–1	2009 UNCAF Nations Cup
