= Juan Carlos Ramírez (footballer) =

Colombian footballer (born 1972)

Personal information
- Full name: Juan Carlos Ramírez Ayala
- Date of birth: 22 March 1972 (age 54)
- Place of birth: Medellín, Colombia
- Height: 1.75 m (5 ft 9 in)
- Position: Midfielder

Youth career
- Arco Zaragoza

Senior career*
Years	Team	Apps	(Gls)
1991–1992	Independiente Medellín	9	(0)
1993–1997	Envigado	206	(1)
1998–1999	Independiente Medellín	72	(2)
1999–2001	Junior	115	(5)
2002–2004	Atlético Nacional	121	(2)
2005–2007	Santa Fe	86	(2)
2008	Atlético Nacional	3	(0)
2008–2009	Deportes Tolima	59	(3)
2010–2011	Envigado	31	(1)

International career
1999–2005	Colombia	30	(0)

Managerial career
- 2011–2018: Envigado (youth)
- 2018: Envigado (interim)
- 2018: Envigado (interim)
- 2022: Colombia U15
- 2022–2024: Colombia U17
- * Club domestic league appearances and goals

Juan Carlos Ramírez Ayala (born 22 March 1972) is a Colombian football manager and former played who played as a midfielder.

Ramírez played in 30 matches for the Colombia national football team from 1999 to 2005, being a part of their squad for the 1999 and 2001 editions of the Copa América.

== Honours ==
Colombia

- Copa América: 2001
