= Jorge Anchén =

Uruguayan footballer (born 1980)

Personal information
- Full name: Jorge Luis Anchén Cajiga
- Date of birth: 17 August 1980 (age 46)
- Place of birth: Montevideo, Uruguay
- Height: 1.76 m (5 ft 9 1/2 in)
- Positions: Right winger; right back

Senior career*
Years	Team	Apps	(Gls)
1999–2006	Danubio FC	154	(5)
2005–2006	→ Argentinos Juniors (loan)	18	(0)
2006–2008	CA Bella Vista	14	(0)
2008	AIK	15	(3)
2009	San Martín de Tucumán	12	(0)
2010–2011	Deportivo Pasto	10	(1)
2013–2015	Rampla Juniors	29	(0)

International career
2001–2002	Uruguay	6	(0)
- * Club domestic league appearances and goals

Jorge Luis Anchén Cajiga (Spanish pronunciation: [ˈxoɾxe anˈtʃen]; born 17 August 1980) is a Uruguayan former football midfielder who played in Argentina, Colombia, Sweden and Uruguay.

== Career ==
Born in Montevideo, Anchén started his professional career in 1999 with Danubio FC. After a loan spell with Argentinos Juniors in 2005-2006 he returned to Uruguay to join Bella Vista.

At the beginning of 2008 he moved to Sweden to join AIK from Bella Vista after one year with AIK he joined San Martín de Tucumán of Argentina.

Afterwards Anchén played for Deportivo Pasto in Colombia.

== International ==
He has been capped 6 times for Uruguay, six times on senior level. Anchén represented his country in the 1999 FIFA World Youth Championship and in 2001 he was selected to play for Uruguay in the Copa América 2001.
