= Carlos Díaz (footballer, born 1979) =

Uruguayan footballer

Personal information
- Full name: Carlos Ríchard Díaz
- Date of birth: 4 February 1979 (age 47)
- Place of birth: Montevideo, Uruguay
- Height: 1.68 m (5 ft 6 in)
- Position: Full back

Senior career*
Years	Team	Apps	(Gls)
1997–2007	Defensor Sporting	220	(4)
2007	Peñarol	7	(0)
2008	Atlético Bucaramanga	1	(0)
2009–2010	Defensor Sporting	20	(1)
2010–2011	Rampla Juniors	11	(0)
2011–2012	Tacuarembó	10	(0)
2012–2015	Racing Club de Montevideo		
2015–	Boston River		

International career
?–1999	Uruguay U20		
1997–2001	Uruguay	6	(0)
- * Club domestic league appearances and goals

Carlos Ríchard Díaz (born 4 February 1979, in Montevideo) is a Uruguayan former footballer. He last played for Boston River in the Segunda División Uruguay.

He was a two-times FIFA U-20 World Cup player.
