= Ubaldo Aquino =

Paraguayan football referee

- Full name: Ubaldo Aquino Valenzano
- Born: May 2, 1958 (age 68)
- Other occupation: Referee Coordinator

Domestic
Years	League	Role
1994-2003	Paraguayan Football Association	Referee
2003-Present	Paraguayan Football Association	Referee Coordinator

International
Years	League	Role
1994-2003	CONMEBOL	Referee
1995-2003	FIFA	Referee

Ubaldo Aquino Valenzano (born May 2, 1958) is a retired football referee from Paraguay, best known for supervising two matches (Germany-Saudi Arabia and Sweden-Senegal) during the 2002 FIFA World Cup in South Korea and Japan.

Aquino is known to have served as a FIFA referee during the period from 1995 to 2003. He officiated in numerous international competitions, including the 1999 FIFA Confederations Cup, 1997 FIFA World Youth Championship, and qualifying matches for the 1998, 2002, and 2006 World Cups. Aquino also served as a referee in the 1999 and 2001 Copa América competitions, officiating the final in 2001.

After retiring from his career as a match official, Aquino has worked as referee coordinator for the Asociación Paraguaya de Fútbol.
