= Iván Córdoba =

Colombian footballer (born 1976)

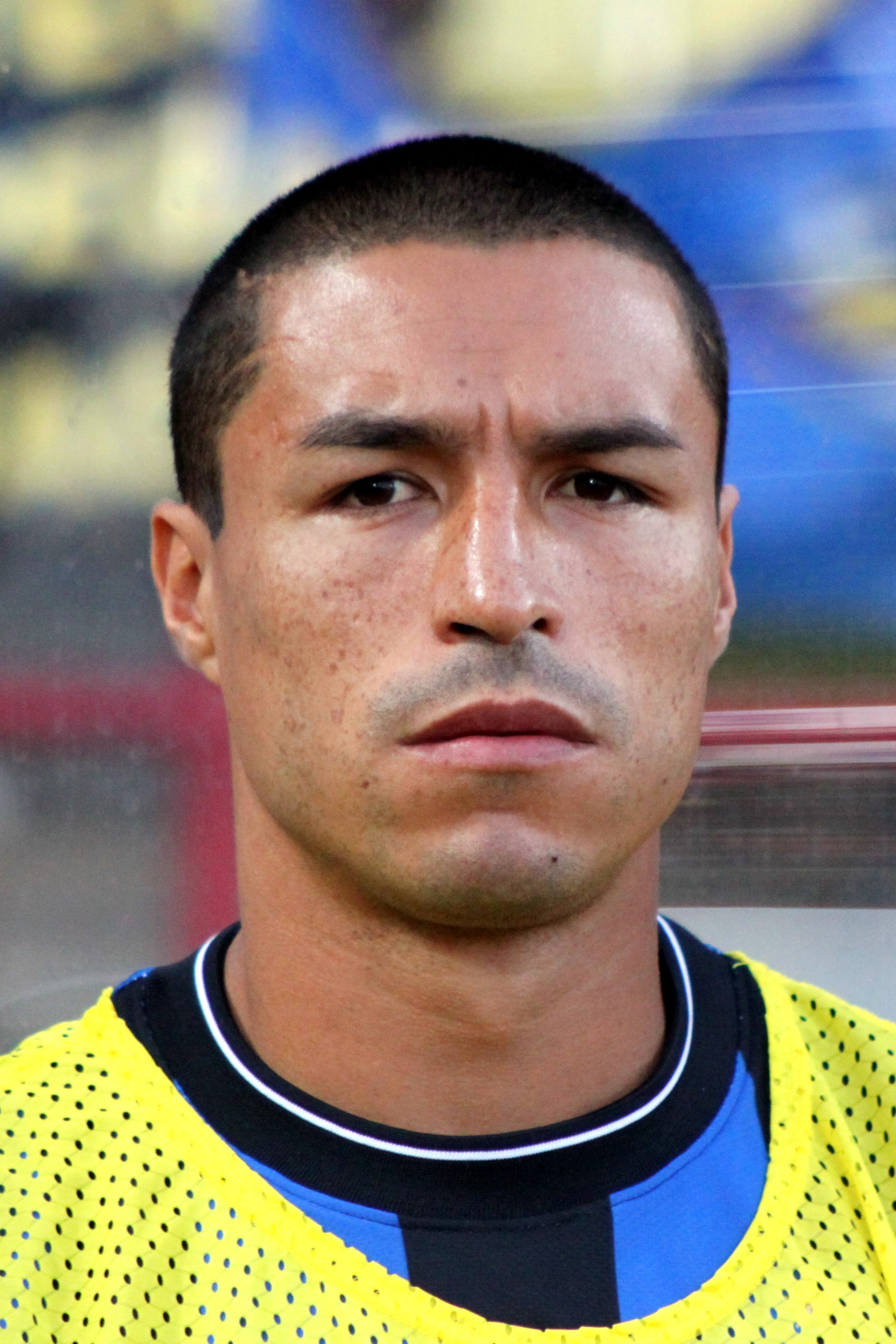
- Córdoba with Inter Milan in 2009

Personal information
- Full name: Iván Ramiro Córdoba Sepúlveda
- Date of birth: 11 August 1976 (age 50)
- Place of birth: Rionegro, Colombia
- Height: 1.73 m (5 ft 8 in)
- Position: Defender

Youth career
- –1992: Deportivo Rionegro

Senior career*
Years	Team	Apps	(Gls)
1993–1995	Deportivo Rionegro	42	(1)
1996–1998	Atlético Nacional	73	(1)
1998–2000	San Lorenzo	59	(8)
2000–2012	Inter Milan	324	(15)
Total		498	(25)

International career
1995–1996	Colombia U20	11	(1)
1996	Colombia U23	1	(0)
1997–2011	Colombia	73	(5)

Managerial career
- 2012–2014: Inter Milan (team manager)
- 2021–2024: Venezia (advisor of management)
Medal record
Men's football
Representing Colombia
Copa América
Winner	2001 Colombia
- * Club domestic league appearances and goals

Iván Ramiro Córdoba Sepúlveda (Spanish pronunciation: [iˈβaŋ ˈkoɾðoβa], born 11 August 1976) is a Colombian former professional footballer who played as a defender.

Córdoba began his career in Colombia with Deportivo Rionegro and Atlético Nacional, before moving to Argentine club San Lorenzo. In 2000, he joined Italian side Inter Milan, where he spent most of his career, remaining with the club until his retirement in 2012.

At international level, Córdoba played for the Colombia national team, and represented his nation at the 1998 FIFA World Cup, the 2003 FIFA Confederations Cup, and four editions of the Copa América, winning the tournament in 2001, where he scored the winning goal in the final.

He was the vice-captain of Inter Milan and also served as captain for his country's national team.

== Club career ==
Córdoba made his debut with the Colombian Serie B team Deportivo Rionegro in 1993, his wonderful performances earned him a transfer to Colombian heavyweights Atlético Nacional in 1996. He made his name playing for San Lorenzo in Argentina from 1998 but signed for Italian side Inter Milan the winter transfer window, January 2000, costing the club €16 million, rejecting another offer from Real Madrid in doing so. He has become a mainstay of the Inter Milan defence for several years, forming a highly effective partnership in central defence with Marco Materazzi. His long career at Inter led him to be named the club's vice-captain behind Javier Zanetti; because of this, he had the honour of lifting the Coppa Italia in 2005 when Zanetti was absent due to his involvement in the Confederations Cup with Argentina.

On 19 February 2008, Córdoba injured his left anterior cruciate ligament during the Champions League round of 16 fixture against Liverpool, resulting in having to sit out the rest of the season as Inter won the league title for the third consecutive year. On 9 June 2008 he renewed his contract until 30 June 2012 with Inter, ensuring that he would effectively finish his career with Inter.

On 5 May 2012, Córdoba announced that he would leave Inter at the end of the season. A day later, Córdoba was brought on in the 84th minute of the Derby della Madonnina, making his last competitive appearance in an Inter shirt after 13 years in the San Siro; during the match (the club's last home game of the 2011–12 season), Inter's players wore the Córdoba No. 2 shirt while warming up before the kick-off. In May, he traveled with 18 other Inter players (with Dellafiore an exception) to Indonesia for a friendly tour, before ending his career.

In total, he won five Serie A championships, four Coppa Italia titles, three Supercoppa Italiana titles, one UEFA Champions League, and one FIFA Club World Cup with Inter.

== International career ==
Córdoba captained Colombia to win the 2001 Copa América competition, scoring the only goal in the final. Córdoba also was called up for his country at the 1998 World Cup (taking shirt number 2 from Andrés Escobar who was murdered in the previous tournament) without appearing in a match, the 2003 FIFA Confederations Cup (where they finished in fourth place), and in three other editions of the Copa América (1997, 1999, and 2007).

== Post-playing career ==
On 10 February 2021, Córdoba was announced as the new sporting director of Italian Serie B club Venezia.

== Style of play ==
Usually a central defender, Córdoba was an experienced and extremely fast, energetic, versatile, and athletic defender, who relied mostly on his pace, stamina, man-marking ability and timing, which made him difficult to beat in one on one situations; due to his characteristics, he was also capable of playing as a full back or wing-back on the right flank on occasion. Despite being only 173 centimeters tall, he was also a good jumper and an accurate header of the ball, and had a penchant for scoring goals with his head. Throughout his career, Córdoba also stood out for his leadership in addition to his ability as a footballer.

== Career statistics ==
=== Club ===
Appearances and goals by club, season and competition
Club	Season	League			Cup		Continental		Other		Total	
Club	Season	Division	Apps	Goals	Apps	Goals	Apps	Goals	Apps	Goals	Apps	Goals
Deportivo Rionegro	1994	Categoría Primera B	16	0	–		–		–		16	0
Deportivo Rionegro	1995	Categoría Primera B	26	1	–		–		–		26	1
Deportivo Rionegro	Total		42	1	0	0	–		–		42	1
Atlético Nacional	1995–96	Categoría Primera A	31	1	–		–		–		31	1
Atlético Nacional	1996–97	Categoría Primera A	42	0	–		–		–		42	0
Atlético Nacional	Total		73	1	0	0	–		–		73	1
San Lorenzo	1997–98	Primera División	24	2	–		–		–		24	2
San Lorenzo	1998–99	Primera División	35	6	–		–		–		35	6
San Lorenzo	Total		59	8	0	0	–		–		59	8
Inter Milan	1999–2000	Serie A	20	0	5	0	–		–		25	0
Inter Milan	2000–01	Serie A	23	0	3	1	9	0	1	0	36	1
Inter Milan	2001–02	Serie A	30	1	1	0	11	0	–		42	1
Inter Milan	2002–03	Serie A	28	1	1	0	16	1	–		45	2
Inter Milan	2003–04	Serie A	31	1	5	0	11	0	–		47	1
Inter Milan	2004–05	Serie A	32	3	4	0	10	0	–		46	3
Inter Milan	2005–06	Serie A	35	4	4	0	9	0	1	0	49	4
Inter Milan	2006–07	Serie A	29	0	5	1	7	0	0	0	41	1
Inter Milan	2007–08	Serie A	20	3	1	0	5	0	1	0	27	3
Inter Milan	2008–09	Serie A	28	2	2	0	7	0	0	0	37	2
Inter Milan	2009–10	Serie A	21	0	2	0	2	0	0	0	25	0
Inter Milan	2010–11	Serie A	22	0	1	0	5	0	2	0	30	0
Inter Milan	2011–12	Serie A	5	0	1	0	0	0	0	0	6	0
Inter Milan	Total		324	15	34	2	92	1	5	0	455	18
Career total			498	25	34	2	92	1	5	0	629	28

=== International ===
Appearances and goals by national team and year
National team	Year	Apps	Goals
Colombia	1997	9	0
Colombia	1998	4	0
Colombia	1999	7	3
Colombia	2000	10	1
Colombia	2001	10	1
Colombia	2002	0	0
Colombia	2003	10	0
Colombia	2004	6	0
Colombia	2005	5	0
Colombia	2006	0	0
Colombia	2007	6	0
Colombia	2008	0	0
Colombia	2009	4	0
Colombia	2010	2	0
Total		73	5

Scores and results list Colombia's goal tally first, score column indicates score after each Córdoba goal.

List of international goals scored by Iván Córdoba
No.	Date	Venue	Cap	Opponent	Score	Result	Competition
1	9 February 1999	Miami Orange Bowl, Miami, United States	14	Germany	3–3	3–3	Friendly
2	4 July 1999	Estadio Feliciano Cáceres, Luque, Paraguay	18	Argentina	1–0	3–0	1999 Copa América
3	13 October 1999	Estadio Olímpico Chateau Carreras, Córdoba, Argentina	20	Argentina	1–1	1–2	Friendly
4	4 June 2000	Estadio Nemesio Camacho, Bogotá, Colombia	24	Venezuela	2–0	3–0	2002 FIFA World Cup qualification
5	29 July 2001	Estadio Nemesio Camacho, Bogotá, Colombia	35	Mexico	1–0	1–0	2001 Copa América Final

== Honours ==
Atlético Nacional

- Copa Interamericana: 1995

Inter Milan

- Serie A: 2005–06, 2006–07, 2007–08, 2008–09, 2009–10
- Coppa Italia: 2004–05, 2005–06, 2009–10, 2010–11
- Supercoppa Italiana: 2005, 2006, 2008, 2010
- UEFA Champions League: 2009–10
- FIFA Club World Cup: 2010

Colombia

- Copa América: 2001

Individual

- South American Team of the Year: 1999
- Pirata d'Oro (Inter Milan Player of the Year): 2011
