= Gonzalo Sorondo =

Uruguayan footballer (born 1979)

Personal information
- Full name: Gonzalo Sorondo Amaro
- Date of birth: October 9, 1979 (age 47)
- Place of birth: Montevideo, Uruguay
- Height: 1.90 m (6 ft 3 in)
- Position: Central defender

Youth career
- 1993–1997: Defensor

Senior career*
Years	Team	Apps	(Gls)
1998–2001	Defensor	61	(4)
2001–2006	Internazionale	11	(0)
2003–2004	→ Standard Liège (loan)	24	(2)
2004–2005	→ Crystal Palace (loan)	20	(0)
2005–2006	→ Charlton Athletic (loan)	7	(0)
2006–2007	Charlton Athletic	1	(0)
2007	Defensor	9	(2)
2007–2011	Internacional	63	(7)
2012	Grêmio	0	(0)
2013	Defensor	0	(0)
Total		196	(15)

International career^{‡}
1998–1999	Uruguay U20		
2000–2005	Uruguay	27	(1)
- * Club domestic league appearances and goals as of September 3, 2013 ‡ National team caps and goals as of September 3, 2009

Gonzalo Sorondo Amaro (born October 9, 1979) is a Uruguayan former footballer who last played for Defensor.

He has earned 27 caps for his country, and played for them at the 2002 FIFA World Cup.

He acquired Brazilian citizenship on September 3, 2009.

== Career ==
=== Club ===
Sorondo began his career with Uruguayan club Defensor Sporting Club, moving to Inter Milan in 2001, playing 11 Serie A games on his first season and none in 2002-2003. By 2003 he was on loan to Belgian club Standard Liège. Crystal Palace took him on loan in August 2004 where he played in the Premier League. A year later another loan, this time to Charlton, was confirmed in July 2005 after he obtained a work permit. At the summer of 2006 he became a free agent, and signed a permanent contract with Charlton. Sorondo was released by Charlton Athletic alongside compatriot Omar Pouso in February 2007 after just one Premier League appearance. He returned to Defensor.

In early 2012, Sorondo, was hired to play Grêmio, from Porto Alegre but during the preseason he had rupture of the anterior cruciate ligament in his right knee and had his contract terminated with the team.

=== International ===
Sorondo played at the 1999 FIFA World Youth Championship, in which Uruguay finished in 4th.

He was a regular member of the Uruguay national team, making his debut against Colombia, the August 15, 2000, and played for his country in the 2002 FIFA World Cup, but has consistently been dropped in recent years, due to injuries and limited league appearances. in which Uruguay finished fourth. He was the only Uruguayan player to be included in the ideal team of the Copa América 2001.
