= Rodrigo Lemos =

Uruguayan footballer (born 1973)

Personal information
- Full name: Rodrigo Javier Lemos Rosende
- Date of birth: 3 October 1973 (age 53)
- Place of birth: Las Piedras, Uruguay
- Height: 1.78 m (5 ft 10 in)
- Position: Midfielder

Youth career
- 1989–1993: Nacional

Senior career*
Years	Team	Apps	(Gls)
1993–1998	Nacional	51	(15)
1998	Tianjin Teda	11	(4)
1999–2001	Bella Vista	90	(32)
2002–2003	Pumas	42	(10)
2003–2004	Delfines de Coatzacoalcos	23	(9)
2004	Lagartos de Tabasco	15	(2)
2005	Audax Italiano	34	(10)
2006	Liverpool de Montevideo	27	(7)
2007	Rentistas	13	(1)
2008–2009	Peñarol de Flores		
2009–2010	Liverpool de Canelones		
2010–2011	Juventud	17	(4)

International career
1992–1993	Uruguay U-20		
1996–2001	Uruguay	8	(1)
- * Club domestic league appearances and goals

Rodrigo Javier Lemos Rosende (born 3 October 1973, in Las Piedras) is a Uruguayan former footballer. He is currently the head coach of Nacional U-17 team.

== Club career ==
Nicknamed La Momia, Lemos spent most of his career playing for Nacional and Bella Vista in the Primera División Uruguaya. He also played with Pumas in the Primera División de México. From 2003 to 2004, he played for Delfines de Coatzacoalcos and Lagartos de Tabasco in Primera División A de México. In 2005, he moved to Audax Italiano in Liga de Primera, made 34 appearances and scored 10 goals. Since 2006, he returned to Uruguay and played for several teams like Liverpool de Montevideo and Rentistas. He last played for Juventud in his hometown.

== International career ==
Lemos was a part of Uruguay national under-20 football team. He played in the 1992 South American U-20 Championship in Colombia and the 1993 FIFA World Youth Championship in Australia.

He made eight appearances for the senior Uruguay national football team from 1996 to 2001. His dedut was in a 1–1 friendly away draw against China on July 17 1996. He was a part of the 2001 Copa América squad, played 6 games and scored once in the competition.
