= Carlos Gutiérrez (footballer, born 1976) =

Uruguayan footballer

Personal information
- Full name: Carlos Eduardo Gutiérrez Silva
- Date of birth: 25 December 1976 (age 49)
- Place of birth: Treinta y Tres, Uruguay
- Height: 1.83 m (6 ft 0 in)
- Position: Defender

Senior career*
Years	Team	Apps	(Gls)
1995–2002	River Plate	155	(2)
2002–2003	Atlético Mineiro	23	(0)
2003–2004	River Plate	21	(0)
2004–2006	FC Rostov	68	(0)
2006–2008	Liverpool		
2008–2010	Central Español	25	(0)
2010–2012	Bella Vista	38	(0)

International career
2001	Uruguay	5	(0)
- * Club domestic league appearances and goals

Carlos Eduardo Gutiérrez Silva (born 25 December 1976), or simply Carlos Gutiérrez, is a Uruguayan former professional footballer. He played for Uruguay at the Copa América 2001.
