= Ninrrol Medina =

Honduran football defender (born 1976)

Ninrol Medina
Personal information
- Full name: Ninrol Edgardo Medina Torres
- Date of birth: 26 August 1976 (age 50)
- Place of birth: San Ignacio, Honduras
- Position: Defender

Senior career*
Years	Team	Apps	(Gls)
1993–2000	Motagua		(2)
2000–2001	Tigrillos Saltillo	32	(0)
2001–2002	Motagua		
2002	Saprissa		
2003–2004	Zacatepec	48	(1)
2004–2005	Atlante	7	(0)
2005–2006	Irapuato	17	(0)
2006–2007	Vida		
2007–2012	Victoria	121	(5)

International career
1994–1995	Honduras U-20		
1995–2004	Honduras	53	(0)

Managerial career
- 2013: Arsenal de Roatán
- 2014-2022: Motagua (assistant coach)
- 2022-2023: Honduras (assistant coach)
- 2023: Motagua
- * Club domestic league appearances and goals

Ninrol Edgardo Medina Torres (born 26 August 1976) is a Honduran retired football defender.

He is the current manager of Honduran Segunda División side Arsenal de Roatán.

== Club career ==
Medina came through the youth ranks at F.C. Motagua and first moved abroad to play in Mexico for Tigrillos Saltillo. He returned to Motagua after a year, but then again crossed the border to play in Costa Rica, where he played for Deportivo Saprissa alongside compatriot Amado Guevara, and another three years in Mexico. He joined Honduran side Vida in 2006 and finished his career as captain of Victoria. He scored 2 league goals for Motagua.

Team	Season	Games	Start	Sub	Goal	YC	RC
Club Deportivo Victoria	2008-09 A	18	18	0	3	3	0

== International career ==
Medina played for Honduras at the 1995 FIFA World Youth Championship in Qatar. Playing in central defence, Medina made his senior debut for the Honduras against Turkey on 11 June 1995. By 1999, he had become a regular starter in the squad, playing next to Samuel Caballero and Reynaldo Clavasquín in the three-man defensive lineup favoured by coach Ramón Maradiaga. He has earned a total of 53 caps, scoring no goals. He has represented his country in 19 FIFA World Cup qualification matches and Medina appeared in all six matches when Honduras took third place at the 2001 Copa América, converting a penalty during the shootout in the third-place victory over Uruguay. He also played fourteen times in the qualifying phase as Honduras narrowly missed out on the 2002 FIFA World Cup and played at the 1997 and 1999, as well as at the 2000 and 2003 CONCACAF Gold Cups.

His final international was an October 2004 FIFA World Cup qualification match against Guatemala.

== Retirement ==
In summer 2012, Medina took over as coach of a local schoolboys team.
