= Pablo Lima =

Uruguayan footballer (born 1981)

Personal information
- Full name: Pablo Martín Lima Olid
- Date of birth: 26 March 1981 (age 45)
- Place of birth: Montevideo, Uruguay
- Height: 1.79 m (5 ft 10 in)
- Position: Left back

Youth career
- Danubio

Senior career*
Years	Team	Apps	(Gls)
2001–2007	Danubio	197	(14)
2007–2010	Vélez Sársfield	49	(4)
2009	→ Rosario Central (loan)	18	(2)
2010–2011	Iraklis	21	(1)
2011–2012	Colón	4	(0)
2012–2013	Quilmes	18	(1)
2013	Danubio	12	(3)
2014–2015	Peñarol	7	(0)
2015–2016	Danubio	10	(1)

International career
2001–2007	Uruguay	14	(1)
- * Club domestic league appearances and goals

Pablo Martín Lima Olid (born 26 March 1981) is a Uruguayan former football left-back.

== Club career ==
=== Danubio ===
Lima made his professional debut in 2001 for Danubio FC. He was an integral part of the Danubio squad that won two league championships in 2004 and 2006–07.

=== Argentina ===
In 2007, he moved to Vélez Sársfield of the Primera División Argentina, at request of then manager Ricardo La Volpe. Lima holds the record of the fastest red card in the history of short tournaments in Argentina (which started in 1991). He was sent off at 2'45'' of Vélez' first game of the Apertura 07, after a violent foul over Colón's Pablo Jerez. He joined Rosario Central on 12 January 2009, on loan from Vélez Sársfield and helped the team avoid relegation by playing all but one game of the tournament and scoring two goals from free kicks.

Lima's contract with Vélez Sársfield was set to end in June 2010 and the club stated publicly it would not be renewed.

=== Iraklis ===
On 2 August 2010 Iraklis announced the signing of a two-year contract with Pablo Lima. He debuted for the club in the opening day of the 2010–2011 Super League season in a 2-1 home win against Greek giants Olympiacos. In matchday 2, he contributed to his team's away draw against Atromitos by making the cross that assisted his teammate Karim Soltani to score a late equaliser. In the next match, a 1-0 home win against AEL, he hit the free kick that forced Daniel Cousin to score an own-goal, in his attempt to clear the ball. After a home defeat, against Kavala in matchday 4, he lost his place in the first team. He reappeared in matchday 13 against Panionios as a substitute in the 77th minute. In the next match of Iraklis, Lima scored his first goal for the club, on a home 1-1 draw against Ergotelis. It was a free-kick hit from way outside the area. That goal was declared as the Best Goal of the 13th matchday of the Greek Super League. The prize was handed to him by former Iraklis player Kyriakos Fytilis. After that match Pablo Lima re-established his place at the starting eleven of the club.

=== Return to Argentina ===
After a stint with the Greek club during the 2010-11 season, he returned to Argentina to join Colón de Santa Fe in July 2011.

On 6 August 2012, Lima signed a one-year loan deal with Quilmes Atlético Club.

== International career ==
Since his debut at the 2001 Copa América Lima played 14 games with the Uruguay national team until his last one so far in 2007. He scored his only goal against Costa Rica during the 2001 Copa América.

Goal	Date	Venue	Opponent	Score	Result	Competition
1.	22 July 2001	Estadio Centenario, Armenia, Colombia	Costa Rica	2–1	2–1	2001 Copa América

== Honours ==
Danubio

- Primera División Uruguaya (2): 2004, 2006–07
