= Gerardo Bedoya =

Colombian footballer (born 1975)

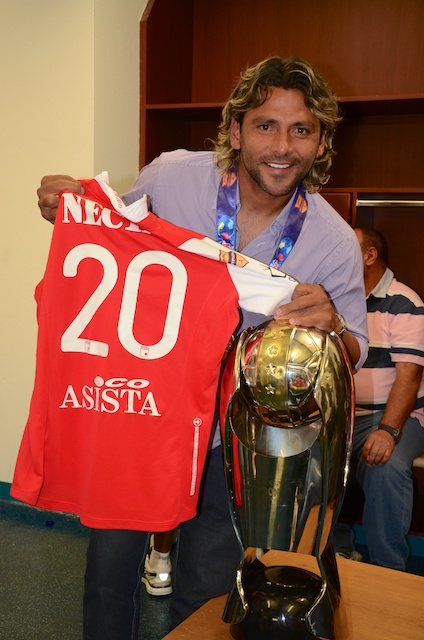
- Bedoya with Santa Fe in 2012.

Personal information
- Full name: Gerardo Alberto Bedoya Múnera
- Date of birth: 26 November 1975 (age 50)
- Place of birth: Ebéjico, Antioquia, Colombia
- Height: 1.75 m (5 ft 9 in)
- Positions: Defensive midfielder; centre back

Youth career
- Envigado

Senior career*
Years	Team	Apps	(Gls)
1995–1997	Deportivo Pereira	45	(3)
1998–2001	Deportivo Cali	118	(5)
2001–2003	Racing Club	54	(5)
2003	Deportivo Cali	18	(2)
2004	Colón	33	(3)
2005	Puebla	15	(1)
2005	Boca Juniors	3	(0)
2005–2006	Atlético Nacional	29	(4)
2006–2010	Millonarios	105	(12)
2010	Envigado	8	(0)
2010	Boyacá Chicó	9	(0)
2011–2013	Santa Fe	90	(10)
2014	Fortaleza	11	(3)
2015	Cúcuta Deportivo	16	(4)
Total		552	(52)

International career^{‡}
2000–2009	Colombia	49	(4)

Managerial career
- 2016: Santa Fe (assistant)
- 2016: Santa Fe (caretaker)
- 2019: Santa Fe
- 2020–2021: Santa Fe (assistant)
- 2022: Valledupar
- 2023: Santa Fe (caretaker)
- 2025: Unión Magdalena (assistant)
- 2025: Unión Magdalena (caretaker)
Medal record
Men's football
Representing Colombia
Copa América
Winner	2001 Colombia
- * Club domestic league appearances and goals as of 21 July 2020 ‡ National team caps and goals as of 16 November 2009

Gerardo Alberto Bedoya Múnera (born 26 November 1975) is a Colombian former footballer and current manager. He began as a defender but he also played as a defensive midfielder.

Nicknamed "The Beast," he currently holds the record for most red cards (46) received by any player in the history of the game.

== Club career ==
Bedoya started his professional career with Deportivo Pereira in 1996. He joined Deportivo Cali in 1998 where he was part of the squad that won the league title in 1998.

In 2001, Bedoya moved to Argentina where he played for Racing Club de Avellaneda, helping the club to win the Apertura 2001 tournament; arguably his most important moment with the club came in that season, where he scored the equalizer in a 1–1 draw against River Plate with 2 matches to go. In 2004, he joined Colón de Santa Fe and in 2005 he moved to Boca Juniors where he only played 3 games (all in the Copa Libertadores) before moving to Mexico to play for Puebla F.C.

In 2005 Bedoya returned to Colombia to play for Atlético Nacional and in 2006 he joined Millonarios. After he went for a brief time to Envigado F.C. But then joined Boyacá Chicó F.C. for the 2010 season.

In 2011, Bedoya signed a one-year contract with Independiente Santa Fe.

Bedoya has the ignominy of being the professional footballer with the most red cards to his name (46 red cards). In the Bogota derby between Independiente Santa Fe and Millonarios on 23 September 2012, he received his 41st red card in a professional game, being sent off for the elbow and subsequent kick to the head aimed at Millonarios player Jhonny Ramirez. The offense also got him suspended for the next 15 matches. Bedoya has been sent off multiple times since.

== International career ==
Bedoya made his debut for the Colombia national team in the 2000 Gold Cup match against Jamaica on 12 February 2000. He scored the equalizing goal in the quarter final penalty shootout victory against the USA on 19 February, where he also earned a red card in the last minute of extra time. Bedoya was also part of the Colombia squad that won the Copa América 2001, where he played five matches and scored a goal in the semi-finals victory against Honduras.

He played all five matches at the 2003 Confederations Cup, where Colombia finished in fourth place. Bedoya was a starting player in the 2006 FIFA World Cup qualifiers, but was not called up for the 2007 Copa América. His last match for the national team was on 1 April 2009, a 2–0 loss against Venezuela.

== Style of play ==
Throughout his career, Bedoya mainly played as a central or defensive midfielder, although he was even deployed on the Left flank on occasion, either as a full-back, wing-back, or as a defender, Centre back due to his versatility. he also possessed a powerful shot, and quick reactions, as well as an excellent positional sense and good anticipation, which enabled him to excel in this position; in his prime, he was widely regarded as one of the best defensive midfielders in the world. His energetic and combative box-to-box style of play, as well as his pace, tactical awareness and abilities as a ball-winner, he currently holds the record for most red cards (46) received by any player in the history of the game.

== Coaching career ==
Following his retirement from his club career, Bedoya went into coaching. In his first position as assistant manager with Santa Fe in 2016, he was dismissed from the dugout after 21 minutes of a league fixture against Junior. That same year, he became caretaker manager of Santa Fe for one match after the departure of Alexis García, and in 2019 he was again appointed as caretaker manager of Santa Fe and soon after he was confirmed as manager on a permanent basis until the arrival of Harold Rivera.

Bedoya left Santa Fe at the end of 2021 and in January 2022 he was appointed as manager of Valledupar in the Colombian second tier, but was dismissed in August 2022. On 12 May 2023 he returned to Santa Fe for a third stint as caretaker, replacing Harold Rivera who had resigned the previous day.

In March 2025, Bedoya joined Alexis García's coaching staff at Unión Magdalena as assistant manager, taking García's place on the bench for matches in the 2025 Apertura tournament since the head coach was ineligible to do so for having been in charge of another team in the same tournament. The following 29 July Unión Magdalena appointed Bedoya as caretaker manager, following Alexis García's resignation. Bedoya himself resigned four days later.

== Career statistics ==
=== International ===
Colombia score listed first, score column indicates score after each Bedoya goal.

International goals by date, venue, cap, opponent, score, result and competition
No.	Date	Venue	Opponent	Score	Result	Competition
1	19 February 2000	Orange Bowl, Miami, United States	United States	2–2	2–2	2000 CONCACAF Gold Cup
2	31 January 2001	Los Angeles Memorial Coliseum, Los Angeles, United States	Mexico	1–2	3–2	Friendly
3	24 April 2001	Estadio Pueblo Nuevo, San Cristóbal, Venezuela	Venezuela	1–2	2–2	2002 FIFA World Cup qualification
4	26 July 2001	Estadio Palogrande, Manizales, Colombia	Honduras	1–0	2–0	2001 Copa América

=== List of career red cards ===
==== Club ====
Team	Years	Cards
Deportivo Pereira	1995–1997	2
Deportivo Cali	1998–2001, 2003	14
Racing Club	2001–2003	5
Colón	2004	2
Atlético Nacional	2005-2006	2
Millonarios	2006–2010	7
Envigado	2010	2
Santa Fe	2011–2013	10
Cúcuta Deportivo	2015	2
Total		46

==== International ====
Team	Years	Cards
Colombia	2001-2009	1
Total		1

==== Coaching ====
Team	Years	Cards
Santa Fe	2020-2021	11
Total		11

== Honours ==
=== Club ===
Deportivo Cali

- Categoría Primera A: 1998

Racing

- Argentine Primera División: 2001 Apertura

Independiente Santa Fe

- Categoría Primera A: 2012 Apertura

=== International ===
Colombia

- Copa América: 2001

=== Records ===
- Most red cards received by a player: 46
