= Alberto Rodríguez (Mexican footballer) =

Mexican footballer (born 1974)

Personal information
- Full name: Alberto Rodríguez Barrera
- Date of birth: April 1, 1974 (age 52)
- Place of birth: Mexico City, Mexico
- Height: 1.68 m (5 ft 6 in)
- Position: Defender

Team information
- Current team: América U-19 (Assistant)

Senior career*
Years	Team	Apps	(Gls)
1992–1994	Pumas	33	(0)
1994–1997	Pachuca	89	(5)
1997	Monterrey	9	(0)
1998–2005	Pachuca	269	(11)
2005–2013	Cruz Azul	66	(1)
2008–2013	Cruz Azul Hidalgo	71	(4)

International career
2001–2005	Mexico	13	(0)

Managerial career
- 2016–2017: Pumas Premier
- 2018–2019: Mexico U20 (Assistant)
- 2020–2023: Mexico U16
- 2023: Mexico U20 (Assistant)
- 2025–: América Reserves and Academy
Medal record
Representing Mexico
Runner-up	Copa América	2001
- * Club domestic league appearances and goals

Alberto Rodríguez Barrera (born 1 April 1974) is a Mexican former professional footballer who played as a defender. His last game was a 2012 Copa Libertadores match against Paraguayan side Libertad after being called from Cruz Azul Hidalgo along with 2002 World Cup teammate Melvin Brown under petition of Cruz Azul's coach then, Enrique Meza, who also coached him at Pachuca. After not playing at Cruz Azul Hidalgo since then, he was cut from the squad, leading Rodríguez to announce his retirement.

He has been capped for the Mexico national team and he was an unused substitute at the 2002 FIFA World Cup.

He started his career with the Pumas, but he moved to the Pachuca Tuzos in 1994. After a short period when he moved to Monterrey, he came back to Pachuca to become the captain of the team and lift 3 National cups, and one CONCACAF Champions Cup.

His last goal was scored in the 2005 Copa Libertadores against Boca Juniors in Hidalgo Stadium.

== Clubs ==
- 1992–1994: Pumas
- 1994–2005: Pachuca
- 1997: Monterrey
- 2005–2008: Cruz Azul
- 2008–2012: Cruz Azul Hidalgo

== Honours ==
Mexico

- Copa América runner-up: 2001
