= Christian Callejas =

Uruguayan footballer (born 1978)

Personal information
- Full name: Christian Fabián Callejas Rodríguez
- Date of birth: 17 May 1978 (age 48)
- Place of birth: Montevideo, Uruguay
- Height: 1.83 m (6 ft 0 in)
- Position: Midfielder

Senior career*
Years	Team	Apps	(Gls)
1995–2002	Danubio	146	(7)
2003–2004	Fenix	38	(2)
2005	Paysandú	31	(7)
2006	Lugano	12	(0)
2006	Racing de Montevideo	12	(0)
2007	Olimpia de Asunción	14	(0)
2008–2010	Hibernians	47	(5)
2010–2011	Durazno FC	17	(2)

International career
1995–1997	Uruguay U20		
1997–2001	Uruguay	14	(1)
- * Club domestic league appearances and goals as of 17 July 2009

Christian Fabián Callejas Rodríguez (born 17 May 1978) is a Uruguayan former football player and current manager.

== Career statistics ==
=== International ===
Appearances and goals by national team and year
National team	Year	Apps	Goals
Uruguay	1997	3	1
Uruguay	1998	1	0
Uruguay	1999	5	0
Uruguay	2000	1	0
Uruguay	2001	4	0
Total		14	1

Scores and results list Uruguay's goal tally first, score column indicates score after each Callejas goal.

List of international goals scored by Christian Callejas
No.	Date	Venue	Opponent	Score	Result	Competition
1	17 December 1997	King Fahd Sports City, Riyadh, Saudi Arabia	South Africa	4–3	4–3	1997 FIFA Confederations Cup

== Honours ==
=== Hibernians ===
- Maltese Premier League
  - Champion, 2008–09

=== Uruguay ===
- Copa América
  - Runner-up: 1999
