= Ricky García (footballer) =

Honduran footballer (born 1971)

Personal information
- Full name: Ricky Denis García García
- Date of birth: 27 July 1971 (age 55)
- Place of birth: Puerto Cortés, Honduras
- Position: Midfielder

Senior career*
Years	Team	Apps	(Gls)
1998–2000	Real España		
2000–2001	Victoria		
2001–2008	Motagua		(5)
2003	Atlético Olanchano		
2004	Municipal Valencia		

International career
1999–2001	Honduras	24	(1)
- * Club domestic league appearances and goals

Ricky Denis García García (born 27 July 1971) is a retired Honduran football player.

== Club career ==
García played for Honduran national league sides Real C.D. España, C.D. Victoria, F.C. Motagua, Atlético Olanchano and Municipal Valencia. In December 2001, when playing for Motagua, García was injured by a policeman after a mass brawl broke out on the pitch in a 2001 Apertura semifinal match against Olimpia. He scored 5 goals in his years with Motagua.

== International career ==
García made his debut for Honduras in a May 1999 friendly match against Haiti and has earned a total of 24 caps, scoring 1 goal. He has represented his country in 7 FIFA World Cup qualification matches and played at the 2001 UNCAF Nations Cup as well as at the 2000 CONCACAF Gold Cup and the 2001 Copa América.

His final international was an October 2001 FIFA World Cup qualification match against Trinidad & Tobago.

=== International goals ===
Scores and results list Honduras' goal tally first.

N.	Date	Venue	Opponent	Score	Result	Competition
1.	29 December 1999	Estadio Alejandro Morera Soto, Alajuela, Costa Rica	Costa Rica	1–1	1-1	Friendly match
