= Óscar Córdoba =

Colombian footballer (born 1970)

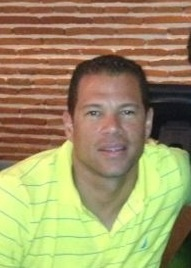
- Cordoba in 2007

Personal information
- Full name: Óscar Eduardo Córdoba Arce
- Date of birth: 3 February 1970 (age 56)
- Place of birth: Cali, Valle, Colombia
- Height: 1.85 m (6 ft 1 in)
- Position: Goalkeeper

Senior career*
Years	Team	Apps	(Gls)
1988	Atlético Nacional	4	(0)
1989–1990	Deportivo Cali	0	(0)
1990	Deportes Quindío	33	(0)
1991–1992	Millonarios	61	(0)
1993	Once Caldas	39	(0)
1993–1997	América de Cali	110	(0)
1997–2001	Boca Juniors	118	(0)
2002	Perugia	15	(0)
2002–2006	Beşiktaş	137	(0)
2006–2007	Antalyaspor	32	(0)
2007–2008	Deportivo Cali	14	(0)
2008–2009	Millonarios	37	(0)
Total		600	(0)

International career
1993–2006	Colombia	73	(0)
- * Club domestic league appearances and goals

Óscar Eduardo Córdoba Arce (born 3 February 1970) is a Colombian retired professional footballer who played as a goalkeeper. He played more than 70 games for the Colombia national team. He is also the only person to never concede a goal in a Copa América edition, having done so in 2001.

== Club career ==
Córdoba started playing professionally with Atlético Nacional in 1988, but transferred to Deportivo Cali in 1989 and loaned to Deportes Quindío in 1990. In 1991, he moved to Millonarios, and in 1993 he played for Once Caldas, and América de Cali, with which he would win the Colombian Championship in 1997.

After the title, he moved to Argentine team Boca Juniors to what was probably his most successful time, winning the Argentine Championships Apertura 1998, Clausura 1999 and Apertura 2000, the Copa Libertadores 2000 and 2001, and the Intercontinental Cup of 2000. In 2000 and 2001 was part of the dream team of America.

Ready to make the jump to Europe, Córdoba moved to Italian Perugia Calcio, but after only half season he transferred to Turkish Beşiktaş. In Turkey he often played against another Colombian goalkeeper of the Süper Lig; Faryd Mondragón of Galatasaray. After four seasons and after winning the 2002–03 Süper Lig and the 2005–06 Turkish Cup, he transferred to Antalyaspor, club in which he announced his retirement after the 2006–07 season. In spite of the announcement, he returned to Colombia and signed for Deportivo Cali to play the following season.

His contract with the Colombian side expired after Deportivo Cali were eliminated in the semi-finals of the Copa Mustang in the Apertura of 2008. In December 2008 he was nominated by the American channel Fox Sports as "Outstanding Career" Award given annually by such means the best athletes in the world. Oscar will be awarded with special recognition for Outstanding Career with Argentine striker Gabriel Batistuta.

After his experience at Deportivo Cali, Córdoba expressed his interest in either returning to Argentina, returning to Turkey, or retiring from football itself. He finally signed for Millonarios where he played until his retirement in December 2009. He won Fox Sports Radio's "Outstanding Career" Award with three other Colombians, including Formula 3 driver Gustavo Yacaman and bronze medal-winning Paralympic athlete Elkin Serna.

== International career ==
Córdoba made his debut for the Colombia national team in a friendly against Costa Rica on 31 March 1993. He went on to make over 70 appearances for his country, making him the most capped goalkeeper in the history of Colombian international football.

In the 1994 FIFA World Cup qualification he started in every game and conceded only two goals making him the best goalkeeper in the playoffs. He played a key role in the 2001 Copa América, playing five of six games, and winning the tournament with no goals conceded. Along with Miguel Calero, the Colombian side kept their net virgin throughout the tournament, first time to ever happen in the Copa América. He also won the award for best goalkeeper in the tournament. He played in the 2003 FIFA Confederations Cup where Colombia came fourth.

On 10 September 2003, Córdoba surpassed René Higuita's record of 68 caps, to become Colombia's all-time record goalkeeper. He was called up to the Colombia national team for his final time in October 2009 as the third goalkeeper in a FIFA World Cup qualifier for the CONMEBOL.

== Honours ==
América de Cali

- Categoría Primera A: 1996–97
- Copa Libertadores: runner-up 1996

Boca Juniors

- Argentine Primera División: 1998 Apertura, 1999 Clausura, 2000 Apertura
- Copa Libertadores: 2000, 2001
- Intercontinental Cup: 2000

Beşiktaş

- Süper Lig: 2002–03
- Turkish Cup: 2005–06

Colombia

- Copa América: 2001

Individual

- Most Valuable Player, 2000 Copa Libertadores
- Best Goalkeeper, 2000 and 2001 Copa Libertadores
- Best Goalkeeper, 2001 Copa América
- Named to the América dream team, 2000 and 2001
- First and only goalkeeper in Copa América history to keep a perfect clean sheet
