= Jesús Arellano =

Mexican footballer (born 1973)

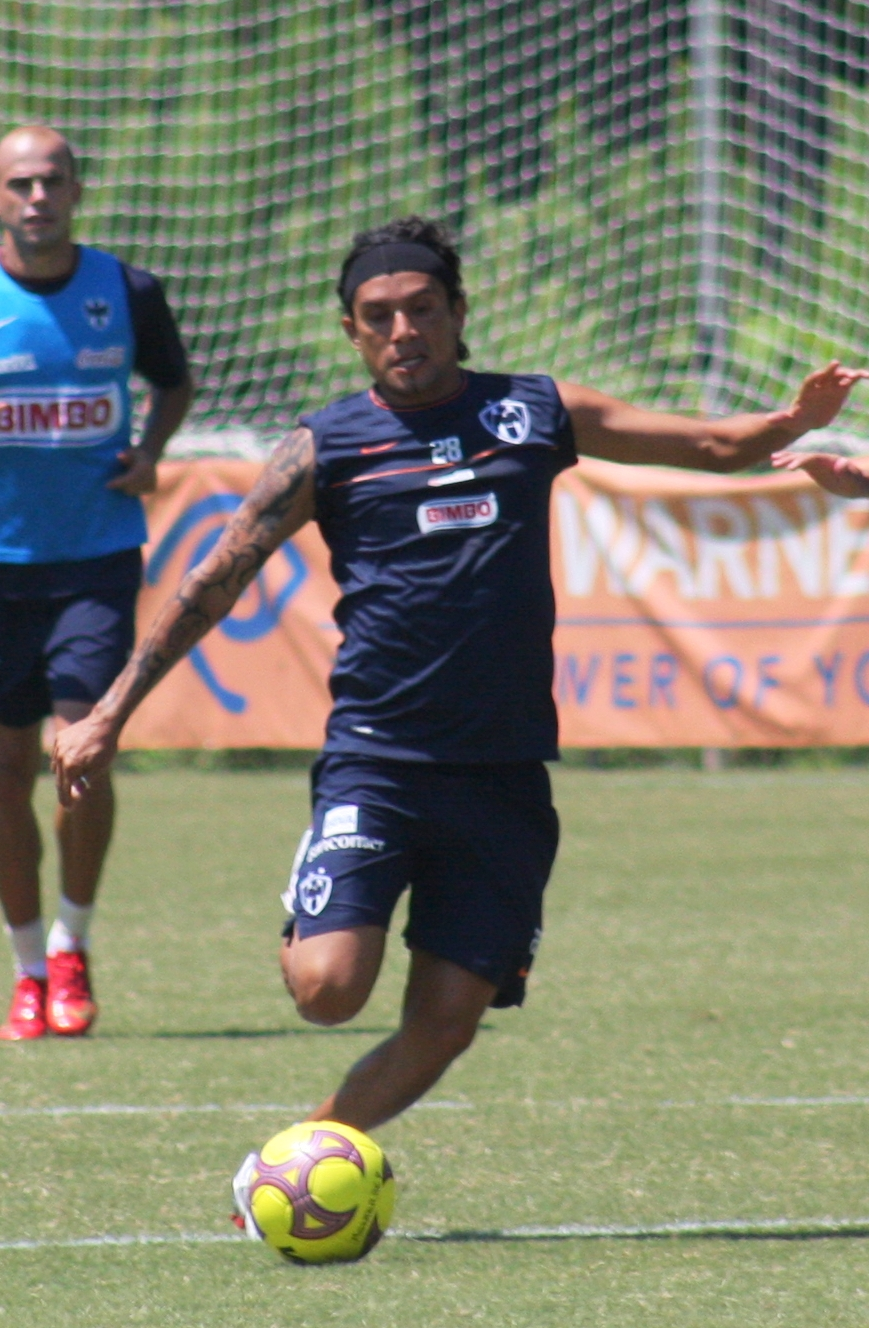
- Arellano with Monterrey in 2008

Personal information
- Full name: José de Jesús Arellano Alcocer
- Date of birth: 8 May 1973 (age 53)
- Place of birth: Monterrey, Nuevo León, Mexico
- Height: 1.71 m (5 ft 7 1/2 in)
- Position: Winger

Senior career*
Years	Team	Apps	(Gls)
1992–1997	Monterrey	111	(9)
1997–2000	Guadalajara	72	(14)
2000–2011	Monterrey	299	(39)
Total		482	(62)

International career
1995–2006	Mexico	69	(7)
Medal record
Men's football
Representing Mexico
FIFA Confederations Cup
Winner	1999 Mexico
CONCACAF Gold Cup
Winner	2003 United States–Mexico
Copa América
Runner-up	2001 Colombia
Pan American Games
Silver medal – second place	1995 Mar del Plata	Team
- * Club domestic league appearances and goals

José de Jesús Arellano Alcocer (born 8 May 1973) is a Mexican former professional footballer who played as a winger, and a wanted fugitive.

Arellano spent the majority of his career with Monterrey, where he became the second most capped player in the club's history.

== Biography ==
Arellano, nicknamed "El Cabrito," is known for his speed, dribbling and passing abilities, Arellano has played an important role for the Mexico national team for many years and has led his country to victories in several occasions. He was one of the players responsible for the erratic comebacks made by Mexico in the World Cup groups stage at France'98. Known as the "Super-Substitute", Arellano was brought in the field, in the late stages of the match, by Mexico's now retired national coach, Manuel Lapuente and help his country come back from seemingly impossible situations to either draw or win the games.

After his debut with CF Monterrey, he tried his luck with the "All Mexican Team", Club Deportivo Guadalajara during the 1998 Fall season. However, Arellano found his success with the "Rayados de Monterrey" club, helping them win the 2003 Clausura championship title in the La Primera División.

In the FIFA World Cup in Korea-Japan 2002, Arellano made less of an impact as a substitute. He was among the starting eleven for three matches, where he helped his country reach the "Elimination Round of 16" of the tournament. In total, he has amassed 70 caps for Mexico, scoring seven times and was among 23 players selected by coach Ricardo La Volpe, to play in the 2006 FIFA World Cup. Arellano played one match throughout the tournament and only appeared in the 2nd half as a substitute player in a 0–0 draw, against Angola.

Jesus Arellano is the seventh Mexican player and the first one to be born in Monterrey to play three World Cups: France 98, Korea-Japan 2002 and Germany 2006.

== Rape allegations and arrest ==
In January 2017, Arellano was accused of raping his 16 year old niece. The minor had provided testimony to authorities and had undergone physical examinations that prompted an investigation. Arellano was arrested in his home in Monterrey on May 4, 2019, after being on the run for over a year. Arellano was in jail for 5 days before being ordered free by a judge due to lack of sufficient evidence. On December 19, 2019, the case was reopened.

In December 2020, Arellano had only his lawyers present in the court to represent him. Authorities issued an arrest warrant the following month for Arellano. As of April 2022, his whereabouts remain unknown.

== Honours ==
Monterrey

- Mexican Primera División: Clausura 2003, Apertura 2009, Apertura 2010
- CONCACAF Champions League: 2010–11
- CONCACAF Cup Winners Cup: 1993

Mexico

- FIFA Confederations Cup: 1999
- CONCACAF Gold Cup: 2003
- CONCACAF Pre-Olympic Tournament: 1996
- Pan American Games Silver Medal: 1995

Individual

- CONCACAF Gold Cup Most Valuable Player: 2003
- CONCACAF Gold Cup Best XI: 2003

== Career statistics ==
=== International goals ===
Scores and results list Mexico's goal tally first.

Goal	Date	Venue	Opponent	Score	Result	Competition
1.	April 28, 1999	Estadio Antonio Oddone Sarubbi, Ciudad del Este, Paraguay	Paraguay	1–2	1–2	Friendly
2.	July 1, 2000	3Com Park at Candlestick Point, San Francisco, United States	El Salvador	2–0	3–0	Friendly
3.	March 7, 2001	Estadio Jalisco, Guadalajara, Mexico	Brazil	3–2	3–3	Friendly
4.	July 22, 2001	Estadio Hernán Ramírez Villegas, Pereira, Colombia	Chile	1–0	2–0	2001 Copa América
5.	September 5, 2001	Estadio Azteca, Mexico City, Mexico	Trinidad and Tobago	2–0	3–0	2002 FIFA World Cup qualification
6.	September 8, 2004	Hasely Crawford Stadium, Port of Spain, Trinidad and Tobago	Trinidad and Tobago	1–0	3–1	2006 FIFA World Cup qualification
7.	September 8, 2004	Hasely Crawford Stadium, Port of Spain, Trinidad and Tobago	Trinidad and Tobago	2–0	3–1	2006 FIFA World Cup qualification
