= Saúl Martínez =

Honduran footballer (born 1976)

Personal information
- Full name: Saúl Asael Martínez Álvarez
- Date of birth: 29 January 1976 (age 50)
- Place of birth: Colón, Honduras
- Height: 5 ft 6 in (1.68 m)
- Position: Forward

Youth career
- 1995–1996: Melgar

Senior career*
| Years | Team | Apps | (Gls) |
| 1997–1998 | Long Island Rough Riders | 41 | (13) |
| 1999 | Miami Fusion | 15 | (4) |
| 1999–2000 | Hampton Roads Mariners | 26 | (16) |
| 2000 | Olimpia | 5 | (1) |
| 2001 | Motagua | 17 | (8) |
| 2001–2002 | Nacional | 7 | (0) |
| 2002–2005 | Shanghai Shenhua | 86 | (36) |
| 2006 | Omiya Ardija | 3 | (0) |
| 2006–2007 | Shanghai United | 12 | (3) |
| 2007 | Motagua | | (1) |
| 2007 | Shanghai Shenhua | 7 | (2) |
| 2008 | Herediano | 8 | (1) |
| 2008–2010 | Marathón | 24 | (9) |
| 2010–2011 | Victoria | 14 | (14) |
| 2011 | Marathón | 6 | (2) |

International career^{‡}
| 2001–2009 | Honduras | 35 | (16) |
- * Club domestic league appearances and goals as of 2008-09-27 ‡ National team caps and goals as of 2009-01-30

Saúl Asael Martínez Álvarez (Latin American Spanish: [saˈul maɾˈtines]; born 29 January 1976) is a Honduran former football forward who last played for Marathón.

== Club career ==
Nicknamed Speedy, Saúl Martínez was born in Colón, Honduras. He started his career at Honduran second division side Melgar before moving abroad to play for American outfit Long Island Rough Riders. He was assigned to Major League Soccer team Miami Fusion in 1999. His first game in Liga Nacional was on 10 December 2000 with Olimpia against Broncos.

=== China ===
Martínez first attracted the attentions of Shanghai Shenhua when he scored four goals against Slovenia during the Lunar New Year Cup in Hong Kong in early 2002. Shenhua quickly signed him and afterwards, Martinez became one of the most important players in the Shenhua team. He would end up playing in Asia for five years, winning the 2003 Chinese league title with Shanghai Shenhua; that title was however taken away from the club in 2013 due to its part in a match-fixing scandal. He also won the 2003 Golden Boot Award with Shanghai.

In January 2008, Martínez joined Costa Rican side Herediano for three months after a move to F.C. Motagua did not materialise. He then had a couple of seasons at Marathón.

He made a remarkable return from retirement with Victoria in the 2010 Apertura season, topping the goalscoring charts at age 34 and ending the season as runner-up behind Jerry Bengtson with 11 goals. In July 2011 he returned for another spell at Marathón.

He retired from football at the end of 2011. In 2013, he returned to playing and joined compatriot Érick Vallecillo at newly formed Miami United of the National Premier Soccer League.

== International career ==
Martínez made his debut for Honduras in a July 2001 friendly match against Ecuador, in which he immediately scored a goal, and has earned a total of 35 caps, scoring 16 goals. He has represented his country in 11 FIFA World Cup qualification matches and played at the 2007 and 2009 UNCAF Nations Cups His international breakthrough however came during the 2001 Copa América, when Honduras surprisingly ended third and Martínez scored the second goal in the historic win over World Cup runners-up Brazil.

His final international was a January 2009 UNCAF Nations Cup match against Panama.

== Career statistics ==
=== Club ===
| Club performance | | | League | |
| Season | Club | League | Apps | Goals |
| United States | | | League | |
|---|---|---|---|---|
| 1997 | Long Island Rough Riders | USISL A-League | 16 | 3 |
| 1998 | Long Island Rough Riders | USISL A-League | 25 | 10 |
| 1999 | Miami Fusion | Major League Soccer | 15 | 4 |
| 2000 | Hampton Roads Mariners | USL A-League | 26 | 16 |
| Honduras | | | League | |
| 2000/01 | Olimpia | Liga Nacional | | |
| 2000/01 | Motagua | Liga Nacional | | |
| Uruguay | | | League | |
| 2001 | Nacional | Primera División | 6 | 0 |
| 2002 | Nacional | Primera División | 1 | 0 |
| China PR | | | League | |
| 2002 | Shanghai Shenhua | Jia-A League | 20 | 8 |
| 2003 | Shanghai Shenhua | Jia-A League | 23 | 14 |
| 2004 | Shanghai Shenhua | Super League | 14 | 6 |
| 2005 | Shanghai Shenhua | Super League | 21 | 6 |
| Japan | | | League | |
| 2006 | Omiya Ardija | J1 League | 3 | 0 |
| China PR | | | League | |
| 2006 | Shanghai United | Super League | 12 | 3 |
| Honduras | | | League | |
| 2006/07 | Motagua | Liga Nacional | | |
| China PR | | | League | |
| 2007 | Shanghai Shenhua | Super League | 7 | 2 |
| Costa Rica | | | League | |
| 2007/08 | Herediano | Primera División | 8 | 1 |
| Honduras | | | League | |
| 2008/09 | Marathón | Liga Nacional | | |
| 2009/10 | Marathón | Liga Nacional | | |
| Country | United States | | 82 | 33 |
| Country | Honduras | | | |
| Country | Uruguay | | 7 | 0 |
| Country | China PR | | 97 | 39 |
| Country | Japan | | 3 | 0 |
| Country | Costa Rica | | 8 | 1 |
| Total | | | 197 | 73 |

=== International ===
Honduras national team
| Year | Apps | Goals |
| 2001 | 9 | 3 |
| 2002 | 2 | 4 |
| 2003 | 5 | 1 |
| 2004 | 11 | 2 |
| 2005 | 1 | 1 |
| 2006 | 0 | 0 |
| 2007 | 3 | 4 |
| 2008 | 1 | 0 |
| 2009 | 3 | 1 |
| Total | 35 | 16 |

=== International goals ===
| N. | Date | Venue | Opponent | Score | Result | Competition |
|---|---|---|---|---|---|---|
| 1 | 7 July 2001 | Orange Bowl, Miami, USA | Ecuador | 1–0 | 1–1 | Friendly match |
| 2 | 23 July 2001 | Estadio Palogrande, Manizales, Colombia | Brazil | 2–0 | 2–0 | 2001 Copa América |
| 3 | 29 July 2001 | Estadio Nemesio Camacho, Bogotá, Colombia | Uruguay | 1–0 | 2–2 | 2001 Copa América |
| 4 | 12 February 2002 | Hong Kong Stadium, So Kon Po, Hong Kong | Slovenia | 1–0 | 5–1 | Carlsberg Cup |
| 5 | 12 February 2002 | Hong Kong Stadium, So Kon Po, Hong Kong | Slovenia | 2–1 | 5–1 | Carlsberg Cup |
| 6 | 12 February 2002 | Hong Kong Stadium, So Kon Po, Hong Kong | Slovenia | 3–1 | 5–1 | Carlsberg Cup |
| 7 | 12 February 2002 | Hong Kong Stadium, So Kon Po, Hong Kong | Slovenia | 4–1 | 5–1 | Carlsberg Cup |
| 8 | 31 January 2003 | Estadio Olímpico Metropolitano, San Pedro Sula, Honduras | Argentina | 1–0 | 1–3 | Friendly match |
| 9 | 25 January 2004 | Hong Kong Stadium, So Kon Po, Hong Kong | Norway | 1–1 | 1–3 | Carlsberg Cup |
| 10 | 18 August 2004 | Estadio Alejandro Morera Soto, Alajuela, Costa Rica | Costa Rica | 5–2 | 5–2 | 2006 FIFA World Cup qualification |
| 11 | 7 September 2005 | Miyagi Stadium, Rifu, Japan | Japan | 3–1 | 4–5 | Friendly match |
| 12 | 27 January 2007 | Estadio Tiburcio Carías Andino, Tegucigalpa, Honduras | Denmark | 1–1 | 1–1 | Friendly match |
| 13 | 15 February 2007 | Estadio Cuscatlán, San Salvador, El Salvador | Nicaragua | 6–1 | 9–1 | 2007 UNCAF Nations Cup |
| 14 | 15 February 2007 | Estadio Cuscatlán, San Salvador, El Salvador | Nicaragua | 8–1 | 9–1 | 2007 UNCAF Nations Cup |
| 15 | 15 February 2007 | Estadio Cuscatlán, San Salvador, El Salvador | Nicaragua | 9–1 | 9–1 | 2007 UNCAF Nations Cup |
| 16 | 24 January 2009 | Estadio Tiburcio Carías Andino, Tegucigalpa, Honduras | Nicaragua | 3–1 | 4–1 | 2009 UNCAF Nations Cup |

== Honours ==
Nacional Montevideo

- Uruguayan Primera División: 2001, 2002

Shanghai Shenhua

- Chinese Jia-A League: 2003 (revoked due to match-fixing scandal)

C.D. Marathón

- Liga Nacional de Fútbol Profesional de Honduras: 2008–09 (Apertura)
