= Freddy Grisales =

Colombian footballer (born 1975)

Personal information
- Full name: Freddy Indurley Grisales
- Date of birth: September 22, 1975 (age 51)
- Place of birth: Medellín, Colombia
- Height: 1.79 m (5 ft 10 in)
- Position: Midfielder

Senior career*
Years	Team	Apps	(Gls)
1996–1998	Atlético Nacional	121	(16)
1999–2000	San Lorenzo	9	(0)
2000–2004	Atlético Nacional	114	(14)
2004–2005	Colón de Santa Fe	17	(2)
2005	Barcelona SC	17	(4)
2006	Independiente Medellín	11	(3)
2006–2007	Colón de Santa Fe	50	(7)
2008	Independiente	13	(0)
2009	Envigado	18	(4)
2009	Junior	1	(0)
2011	Deportivo Pereira	23	(0)
Total		394	(50)

International career
1999–2007	Colombia	40	(6)
- * Club domestic league appearances and goals

Freddy "Totono" Grisales (born 22 September 1975) is a retired Colombian football midfielder. He retired at the end of 2009, having played his last season with Junior in the Colombian Professional Football league.

== Career ==
Grisales began his career in 1998 with Atlético Nacional, where he helped the team win the Colombian Championship in 1999 (although he and his family are fans of Independiente Medellín). In 1999, he joined San Lorenzo in Argentina, but he only played 6 games for the club before returning to Nacional.

In 2001, Grisales was part of the Colombian squad that won the Copa América 2001.

He made his debut with Colón de Santa Fe, Argentina, in 2004, followed by spells with Barcelona SC (Ecuador) and Independiente Medellín (Colombia) before rejoining Colón in 2006.

During his time at Independiente in Argentina, Grisales suffered a series of injuries and personal problems that prevented him from playing regularly and in 2009, he returned to Colombia to play for Envigado Fútbol Club.

In 2011, Grisales returned to play for Deportivo Pereira.

=== International goals ===
Colombia's score is listed first; the score column indicates the score after each Grisales goal.

International goals by date, venue, cap, opponent, score, result and competition
No.	Date	Venue	Opponent	Score	Result	Competition
1	3 February 2001	Miami Orange Bowl, Miami, United States	United States	1–0	1–0	Friendly
2	28 February 2001	Estadio El Campín, Bogotá, Colombia	Australia	3–0	3–2	Friendly
3	11 July 2001	Estadio Metropolitano Roberto Meléndez, Barranquilla, Colombia	Venezuela	1–0	2–0	Copa América 2001
4	7 January 2001	Estadio El Campín, Bogotá, Colombia	Chile	1–0	3–1	2002 FIFA World Cup qualification
5	31 March 2004	National Stadium of Peru, Lima, Peru	Peru	1–0	2–0	2006 FIFA World Cup qualification
6	9 October 2004	Estadio Metropolitano Roberto Meléndez, Barranquilla, Colombia	Paraguay	1–0	1–1	2006 FIFA World Cup qualification

== Titles ==
Season	Club	Title
1999	Atlético Nacional	Fútbol Profesional Colombiano
2001	Colombia	Copa América
