= Andrés Martínez (footballer) =

Uruguayan footballer (born 1972)

Personal information
- Full name: Andrés Javier Martínez Palazzini
- Date of birth: 16 October 1972 (age 54)
- Place of birth: Pando, Uruguay
- Height: 1.86 m (6 ft 1 in)
- Position: Midfielder

Senior career*
Years	Team	Apps	(Gls)
1991–1994	Peñarol	71	(3)
1995	Osasuna	40	(5)
1996	Cerro	2	(0)
1997	Defensor Sporting	15	(5)
1997–1998	Lecce	12	(0)
1998	Bologna	1	(0)
1998–2001	Defensor Sporting	64	(10)
2002	Bella Vista	14	(2)
2003	Racing de Ferrol	12	(0)
2004	Defensor Sporting	7	(0)
2006	Racing (URU)	6	(0)
2007	Progreso		

International career
1992–2001	Uruguay	8	(1)
- * Club domestic league appearances and goals

Andrés Javier Martínez (born 16 October 1972) is a former Uruguayan footballer who played as a midfielder.

== International career ==
Martínez made eight appearances for the senior Uruguay national football team from 1992 to 2001. He made his debut in a friendly match against Poland (0–1 loss) on November 29, 1992, in the Estadio Centenario in Montevideo under coach Luis Alberto Cubilla.
