= Joe Bizera =

Uruguayan footballer (born 1980)

Personal information
- Full name: Joe Émerson Bizera Bastos
- Date of birth: 17 May 1980 (age 46)
- Place of birth: Artigas, Uruguay
- Height: 1.88 m (6 ft 2 in)
- Position: Defender

Team information
- Current team: Liverpool Montevideo

Senior career*
Years	Team	Apps	(Gls)
1999–2005	Peñarol	120	(11)
2005–2008	Cagliari	35	(0)
2008	→ Maccabi Tel Aviv (loan)	16	(2)
2008–2010	PAOK	20	(0)
2010	Albacete	7	(0)
2010–2011	Maccabi Petah Tikva	30	(1)
2011	Bella Vista	2	(0)
2012–2013	Libertad	24	(1)
2013	Atlante	13	(1)
2013–2015	Peñarol	18	(0)
2016	Villa Teresa	5	(0)
2016	Liverpool Montevideo	8	(0)
Total		298	(16)

International career
2001–2004	Uruguay	23	(1)
- * Club domestic league appearances and goals

Joe Émerson Bizera Bastos (born 17 May 1980 in Artigas) is a Uruguayan former football player, who last played for Liverpool Montevideo. Bizera played for Cagliari in Italy. In January 2008, he made a loan move to Maccabi Tel Aviv F.C. until the end of the season. In the same year, he signed for PAOK FC.

== International career ==
For the Uruguay national football team he was a participant at the 2002 FIFA World Cup.
