= 2001 Copa América =

- Official logo

Tournament details
- Host country: Colombia
- Dates: 11–29 July
- Teams: 12 (from 2 confederations)
- Venues: 7 (in 7 host cities)

Final positions
- Champions: Colombia (1st title)
- Runners-up: Mexico
- Third place: Honduras
- Fourth place: Uruguay

Tournament statistics
- Matches played: 26
- Goals scored: 60 (2.31 per match)
- Attendance: 877,000 (33,731 per match)
- Top scorer(s): (Colombia) Víctor Aristizábal (6 goals)
- Best player: (Honduras) Amado Guevara

The 2001 Copa América was held in Colombia, from 11 to 29 July. It was organised by CONMEBOL, South America's football governing body. Colombia won the tournament for the 1st time without conceding a goal.

Brazil were the two-time defending champions, but they were knocked out of the tournament by Honduras after suffering a 0–2 defeat in the quarter-final.

There is no qualifying for the final tournament. CONMEBOL's ten South American countries participate, along with two more invited countries, making a total of twelve teams competing in the tournament. Originally, Mexico and CONCACAF Champions Canada were invited.

Prior to the tournament, three meetings were held by CONMEBOL authorities who were concerned about potential security issues in Colombia. On 1 July they announced the cancellation of the tournament. Venezuela offered to host the competition, but on 6 July CONMEBOL decided to reinstate the plans for Colombia, and the tournament was held on schedule.

When the tournament was originally cancelled, Canada disbanded its training camp and Canadian players returned to their club teams. The Canadian Soccer Association announced they would not be able to participate in the reinstated tournament. With only a few days' notice, Costa Rica (CONCACAF) accepted an invite to take Canada's spot in the tournament. The Costa Ricans advanced to the knockout stage, losing in the quarterfinals.

Complaining about the sudden reversal, and claiming that Argentine players had received death threats from terrorist groups, the Argentine Football Association decided to withdraw from the competition on 10 July, in spite of Colombian authorities proposing to implement additional protection measures. With the tournament starting the next day, Honduras (CONCACAF) were invited, arriving with barely enough players on 13 July in an airplane provided by the Colombian Air Force, after the tournament had started and just a few hours before its first game. The Hondurans performed well through the tournament, finishing in third place.

Despite the pre-tournament concerns, there were no incidents of violence nor acts of assault towards any of the participating nations.

== Venues ==
Barranquilla	2001 Copa América is located in Colombia		
Estadio Metropolitano	2001 Copa América is located in Colombia		
Capacity: 60,000	2001 Copa América is located in Colombia		
Medellín	2001 Copa América is located in Colombia		
Estadio Atanasio Girardot	2001 Copa América is located in Colombia		
Capacity: 52,000	2001 Copa América is located in Colombia		
Bogotá	2001 Copa América is located in Colombia		
Estadio El Campín	2001 Copa América is located in Colombia		
Capacity: 48,300	2001 Copa América is located in Colombia		
Cali	Manizales	Pereira	Armenia
Estadio Pascual Guerrero	Estadio Palogrande	Estadio Hernán Ramírez Villegas	Estadio Centenario
Capacity: 45,625	Capacity: 36,553	Capacity: 30,313	Capacity: 29,000

== Squads ==
For a complete list of participating squads: 2001 Copa América squads

== Draw ==
The draw for the competition took place on 10 January 2001 at the Corferias convention center in Bogotá. The teams were divided into three groups of four teams each.

Pot 1	Pot 2	Pot 3	Pot 4
Colombia (assigned to Group A); Brazil (assigned to Group B); Argentina (assigned to Group C)	Chile; Paraguay; Uruguay	Bolivia; Ecuador; Peru	Venezuela; Canada; Mexico

Shortly before the start of the tournament, two teams drawn into group C (Argentina and Canada) withdrew and were replaced by other invited teams (Costa Rica and Honduras). This did not affect composition of other groups.

== Group stage ==
Each team plays one match against each of the other teams within the same group. Three points are awarded for a win, one point for a draw and zero points for a defeat.

First and second placed teams, in each group, advance to the quarter-finals. The best third placed team and the second best third placed team, also advance to the quarter-finals.

Tie-breaking criteria

Teams were ranked on the following criteria:

1. Greater number of points in all group matches
2. Goal difference in all group matches
3. Greater number of goals scored in all group matches
4. Head-to-head results
5. Drawing of lots by the CONMEBOL Organising Committee

Key to colors in group tables
Group winners, runners-up, and best two third-placed teams advance to the quarterfinals

- All times local (UTC-5)

=== Group A ===
Team	Pld	W	D	L	GF	GA	GD	Pts
Colombia	3	3	0	0	5	0	+5	9
Chile	3	2	0	1	5	3	+2	6
Ecuador	3	1	0	2	5	5	0	3
Venezuela	3	0	0	3	0	7	−7	0

11 July 2001
18:00

Ecuador	1–4	Chile
Chalá 52'	Report	Navia 29'; Montecinos 72', 90'; Corrales 84'

Estadio Metropolitano, Barranquilla
Attendance: 40,000
Referee: René Ortubé (Bolivia)
11 July 2001
20:45

Colombia	2–0	Venezuela
Grisales 15'; Aristizábal 59' (pen.)	Report

Estadio Metropolitano, Barranquilla
Attendance: 50,000
Referee: Gilberto Hidalgo (Peru)

14 July 2001
16:15

Chile	1–0	Venezuela
Montecinos 78'	Report

Estadio Metropolitano, Barranquilla
Attendance: 33,000
Referee: Gilberto Alcalá (Mexico)
14 July 2001
18:30

Colombia	1–0	Ecuador
Aristizábal 29'	Report

Estadio Metropolitano, Barranquilla
Attendance: 40,000
Referee: Ubaldo Aquino (Paraguay)

17 July 2001
18:30

Ecuador	4–0	Venezuela
Delgado 19', 63'; Fernández 29'; Méndez 60'	Report

Estadio Metropolitano, Barranquilla
Attendance: 20,000
Referee: Gilberto Hidalgo (Peru)
17 July 2001
20:45

Colombia	2–0	Chile
Aristizábal 10' (pen.); Arriaga 90'	Report

Estadio Metropolitano, Barranquilla
Attendance: 50,000
Referee: Jorge Larrionda (Uruguay)

=== Group B ===
Team	Pld	W	D	L	GF	GA	GD	Pts
Brazil	3	2	0	1	5	2	+3	6
Mexico	3	1	1	1	1	1	0	4
Peru	3	1	1	1	4	5	−1	4
Paraguay	3	0	2	1	4	6	−2	2

12 July 2001
17:30

Peru	3–3	Paraguay
Lobatón 16'; Pajuelo 57'; Del Solar 72'	Report	Ferreira 23', 64'; Garay 90'

Estadio Pascual Guerrero, Cali
Attendance: 35,000
Referee: Ángel Sánchez (Argentina)
12 July 2001
19:45

Brazil	0–1	Mexico
	Report	Borgetti 5'

Estadio Pascual Guerrero, Cali
Attendance: 38,000
Referee: Óscar Ruiz (Colombia)

15 July 2001
16:00

Brazil	2–0	Peru
Guilherme 9'; Denílson 85'	Report

Estadio Pascual Guerrero, Cali
Attendance: 30,000
Referee: Jorge Larrionda (Uruguay)
15 July 2001
18:15

Paraguay	0–0	Mexico
	Report

Estadio Pascual Guerrero, Cali
Attendance: 40,000
Referee: Roger Zambrano (Ecuador)

18 July 2001
17:30

Peru	1–0	Mexico
Holsen 48'	Report

Estadio Pascual Guerrero, Cali
Attendance: 20,000
Referee: René Ortubé (Bolivia)
18 July 2001
19:45

Brazil	3–1	Paraguay
Alex 60'; Belletti 89'; Denílson 90'	Report	Alvarenga 11' (pen.)

Estadio Pascual Guerrero, Cali
Attendance: 40,000
Referee: Ángel Sánchez (Argentina)

=== Group C ===
Team	Pld	W	D	L	GF	GA	GD	Pts
Costa Rica	3	2	1	0	6	1	+5	7
Honduras	3	2	0	1	3	1	+2	6
Uruguay	3	1	1	1	2	2	0	4
Bolivia	3	0	0	3	0	7	−7	0

13 July 2001
18:00

Bolivia	0–1	Uruguay
	Report	Chevantón 60'

Estadio Atanasio Girardot, Medellín
Attendance: 38,000
Referee: Mauricio Navarro (Canada)
13 July 2001
20:15

Honduras	0–1	Costa Rica
	Report	Wanchope 63'

Estadio Atanasio Girardot, Medellín
Attendance: 35,000
Referee: Mario Sánchez (Chile)

16 July 2001
18:00

Uruguay	1–1	Costa Rica
C. Morales 53'	Report	Wanchope 28'

Estadio Atanasio Girardot, Medellín
Attendance: 20,000
Referee: Carlos Eugênio Simon (Brazil)
16 July 2001
20:15

Honduras	2–0	Bolivia
Guevara 53', 68'	Report

Estadio Atanasio Girardot, Medellín
Attendance: 25,000
Referee: John Toro Rendón (Colombia)

19 July 2001
18:00

Bolivia	0–4	Costa Rica
	Report	Wanchope 45', 71'; Bryce 63'; Fonseca 84'

Estadio Atanasio Girardot, Medellín
Attendance: 25,000
Referee: Luis Solórzano (Venezuela)
19 July 2001
20:15

Honduras	1–0	Uruguay
Guevara 86'	Report

Estadio Atanasio Girardot, Medellín
Attendance: 35,000
Referee: Roger Zambrano (Ecuador)

=== Ranking of third-placed teams ===
At the end of the first stage, a comparison was made between the third-placed teams of each group. The two best third-placed teams advanced to the quarter-finals.

Grp	Team	Pld	W	D	L	GF	GA	GD	Pts
C	Uruguay	3	1	1	1	2	2	0	4
B	Peru	3	1	1	1	4	5	−1	4
A	Ecuador	3	1	0	2	5	5	0	3

== Knockout stage ==
=== Bracket ===
Quarter-finals
22 July – Pereira
Chile	0
Mexico	2
22 July – Armenia
Costa Rica	1
Uruguay	2
23 July – Armenia
Colombia	3
Peru	0
23 July – Manizales
Brazil	0
Honduras	2

Semi-finals
25 July – Pereira
Mexico	2
Uruguay	1
26 July – Manizales
Colombia	2
Honduras	0

Final
29 July – Bogotá
Mexico	0
Colombia	1
Third place
29 July – Bogotá
Uruguay	2 (4)
Honduras (p)	2 (5)

=== Quarter-finals ===
22 July 2001
15:00

Chile	0–2	Mexico
	Report	Arellano 17'; Osorno 78'

Estadio Hernán Ramírez Villegas, Pereira
Attendance: 20,000
Referee: Carlos Eugênio Simon (Brazil)

22 July 2001
17:30

Costa Rica	1–2	Uruguay
Wanchope 52'	Report	Lemos 61' (pen.); Lima 87'

Estadio Centenario, Armenia
Attendance: 29,000
Referee: Óscar Ruiz (Colombia)

23 July 2001
17:30

Colombia	3–0	Peru
Aristizábal 50', 69'; Hernández 66'	Report

Estadio Centenario, Armenia
Attendance: 30,000
Referee: Gilberto Alcalá (Mexico)

23 July 2001
19:45

Brazil	0–2	Honduras
	Report	Belletti 57' (o.g.); Martínez 90+4'

Estadio Palogrande, Manizales
Attendance: 30,000
Referee: Ubaldo Aquino (Paraguay)

=== Semi-finals ===
25 July 2001
19:45

Mexico	2–1	Uruguay
Borgetti 14'; García Aspe 67' (pen.)	Report	R. Morales 32'

Estadio Hernán Ramírez Villegas, Pereira
Attendance: 20,000
Referee: Ángel Sánchez (Argentina)

26 July 2001
19:45

Colombia	2–0	Honduras
Bedoya 6'; Aristizábal 63'	Report

Estadio Palogrande, Manizales
Attendance: 40,000
Referee: Mario Sánchez (Chile)

=== Third-place match ===
29 July 2001
14:00

Uruguay	2–2	Honduras
Bizera 22'; Martínez 45'	Report	Martínez 14'; Izaguirre 42'
Penalties
Sorondo (penalty scored); Gutiérrez (penalty missed); Rodríguez (penalty scored); Lemos (penalty scored); Olivera (penalty scored)	4–5	(penalty scored) Pineda; (penalty scored) Martínez; (penalty scored) García; (penalty scored) Medina; (penalty scored) Izaguirre

Estadio El Campín, Bogotá
Attendance: 47,000
Referee: Gilberto Hidalgo (Peru)

=== Final ===
29 July 2001
16:30

Mexico	0–1	Colombia
	Report	I. Córdoba 65'

Estadio El Campín, Bogotá
Attendance: 47,000
Referee: Ubaldo Aquino (Paraguay)

== Result ==
2001 Copa América champions

Colombia
1st title

== Statistics ==
=== Goalscorers ===
With six goals, Víctor Aristizábal was the top scorer in the tournament. There were 60 goals scored in 26 matches, for an average of 2.31 goals per match.

6 goals

- (Colombia) Víctor Aristizábal

5 goals

- (Costa Rica) Paulo Wanchope

3 goals

- (Chile) Cristián Montecinos
- (Honduras) Amado Guevara

2 goals

- (Brazil) Denílson
- (Ecuador) Agustín Delgado
- (Honduras) Saúl Martínez
- (Mexico) Jared Borgetti
- (Paraguay) Virgilio Ferreira

1 goal

- (Brazil) Alex
- (Brazil) Juliano Belletti
- (Brazil) Guilherme
- (Chile) Marcelo Corrales
- (Chile) Reinaldo Navia
- (Colombia) Eudalio Arriaga
- (Colombia) Gerardo Bedoya
- (Colombia) Iván Córdoba
- (Colombia) Freddy Grisales
- (Colombia) Giovanni Hernández
- (Costa Rica) Steven Bryce
- (Costa Rica) Rolando Fonseca
- (Ecuador) Cléber Chalá
- (Ecuador) Ángel Fernández
- (Ecuador) Édison Méndez
- (Honduras) Júnior Izaguirre
- (Mexico) Jesús Arellano
- (Mexico) Alberto García Aspe
- (Mexico) Daniel Osorno
- (Paraguay) Guido Alvarenga
- (Paraguay) Silvio Garay
- (Peru) José del Solar
- (Peru) Roberto Holsen
- (Peru) Abel Lobatón
- (Peru) Juan Pajuelo
- (Uruguay) Joe Bizera
- (Uruguay) Javier Chevantón
- (Uruguay) Rodrigo Lemos
- (Uruguay) Pablo Lima
- (Uruguay) Andrés Martínez
- (Uruguay) Carlos Morales
- (Uruguay) Richard Morales

1 own goal

- (Brazil) Juliano Belletti (against Honduras)

=== All-Star Team ===
The Copa América 2001 Ideal Team was an all-star selection of eleven outstanding players from the tournament.

Goalkeepers	Defenders	Midfielders	Forwards
(Colombia) Óscar Córdoba	(Colombia) Iván López (Uruguay) Gonzalo Sorondo (Colombia) Mario Yepes (Colombia) Gerardo Bedoya	(Paraguay) Julio César Cáceres (Honduras) Amado Guevara (Peru) Juan Carlos Bazalar (Colombia) Edison Chará	(Mexico) Jared Borgetti (Colombia) Víctor Aristizábal

=== Final positions ===
Pos	Team	Pld	W	D	L	GF	GA	GD	Pts	Eff
1	Colombia	6	6	0	0	11	0	+11	18	100.0%
2	Mexico	6	3	1	2	5	3	+2	10	55.6%
3	Honduras	6	3	1	2	7	5	+2	10	55.6%
4	Uruguay	6	2	2	2	7	7	0	8	44.4%
Eliminated in the Quarterfinals
5	Costa Rica	4	2	1	1	7	3	+4	7	58.3%
6	Brazil	4	2	0	2	5	4	+1	6	50.0%
7	Chile	4	2	0	2	5	5	0	6	50.0%
8	Peru	4	1	1	2	4	8	−4	4	33.3%
Eliminated in the First Stage
9	Ecuador	3	1	0	2	5	5	0	3	33.3%
10	Paraguay	3	0	2	1	4	6	−2	2	22.2%
11	Bolivia	3	0	0	3	0	7	−7	0	0.0%
12	Venezuela	3	0	0	3	0	7	−7	0	0.0%

== Marketing ==
=== Sponsorship ===
Global platinum sponsor:

- Telefónica
- Mastercard-Maestro
- Corona

Global gold sponsor:

- Coca-Cola
- Banamex

Local supplier

- Traffic Group
