= 2001 Copa América squads =

Iist of footballers

Below are the rosters of the teams that participated in the 2001 Copa América.

== Group A ==
=== Chile ===
Head coach: Pedro García

No.	Pos.	Player	Date of birth (age)	Caps	Goals	Club
1	GK	Sergio Vargas	17 August 1965 (aged 35)			(Football Federation of Chile) Universidad de Chile
2	DF	Mauricio Pozo	16 August 1970 (aged 30)			(Football Federation of Chile) Cobreloa
3	MF	Claudio Maldonado	3 January 1980 (aged 21)			(Brazilian Football Confederation) São Paulo
4	DF	David Henríquez	12 July 1977 (aged 23)			(Football Federation of Chile) Colo-Colo
5	DF	Luis Fuentes	14 August 1971 (aged 29)			(Football Federation of Chile) Cobreloa
6	DF	Pedro Reyes	13 November 1972 (aged 28)			(French Football Federation) AJ Auxerre
7	DF	Eros Pérez	3 June 1976 (aged 25)			(Argentine Football Association) Colón
8	MF	Alejandro Osorio	24 September 1976 (aged 24)			(Argentine Football Association) Estudiantes La Plata
9	FW	Reinaldo Navia	10 May 1978 (aged 23)			(Mexican Football Federation) Tecos
10	FW	Manuel Neira	12 October 1977 (aged 23)			(Football Federation of Chile) Unión Española
11	MF	Rodrigo Valenzuela	29 November 1975 (aged 25)			(Football Federation of Chile) Santiago Wanderers
12	GK	Carlos Toro	4 February 1976 (aged 25)			(Football Federation of Chile) Santiago Wanderers
13	FW	Marcelo Corrales	20 February 1971 (aged 30)			(Football Federation of Chile) San Felipe
14	DF	Mauricio Aros	9 March 1976 (aged 25)			(Football Federation of Chile) Universidad de Chile
15	FW	Cristián Montecinos	19 December 1970 (aged 30)			(Football Federation of Chile) Deportes Concepción
16	DF	Ricardo Rojas	7 May 1974 (aged 27)			(Mexican Football Federation) América
17	MF	Moisés Villarroel	12 February 1976 (aged 25)			(Football Federation of Chile) Santiago Wanderers
18	MF	Marco Villaseca	15 March 1975 (aged 26)			(Football Federation of Chile) Colo-Colo
19	MF	Pablo Galdames	26 June 1974 (aged 27)			(Mexican Football Federation) Cruz Azul
20	MF	Rodrigo Núñez	5 February 1977 (aged 24)			(Football Federation of Chile) Santiago Wanderers
21	DF	Rodrigo Barra	24 September 1975 (aged 25)			(Football Federation of Chile) Santiago Wanderers
22	GK	Nelson Tapia (c)	22 June 1966 (aged 35)			(Argentine Football Association) Vélez Sarsfield

=== Colombia ===
Head coach: Francisco Maturana

No.	Pos.	Player	Date of birth (age)	Caps	Goals	Club
1	GK	Óscar Córdoba	9 February 1970 (aged 31)			(Argentina) Boca Juniors
2	DF	Iván Córdoba (c)	11 August 1976 (aged 24)			(Italy) Internazionale
3	DF	Mario Yepes	13 January 1976 (aged 25)			(Argentina) River Plate
4	DF	Roberto Carlos Cortés	20 June 1977 (aged 24)			(Colombia) Independiente Medellín
5	DF	Andrés Orozco	18 March 1979 (aged 22)			(Colombia) Independiente Medellín
6	MF	Fabián Vargas	17 April 1980 (aged 21)			(Colombia) América de Cali
7	FW	Elson Becerra	26 April 1978 (aged 23)			(Colombia) Deportes Tolima
8	MF	David Ferreira	9 August 1979 (aged 21)			(Colombia) América de Cali
10	FW	Víctor Aristizábal	9 December 1971 (aged 29)			(Colombia) Deportivo Cali
11	FW	Eudalio Arriaga	19 September 1975 (aged 25)			(Colombia) Atlético Junior
12	GK	Miguel Calero	14 April 1971 (aged 30)			(Mexico) Pachuca
13	MF	John Restrepo	22 August 1977 (aged 23)			(Colombia) Independiente Medellín
14	DF	Iván López	13 May 1978 (aged 23)			(Colombia) Santa Fe
15	FW	Elkin Murillo	20 September 1977 (aged 23)			(Colombia) Deportivo Cali
16	DF	Jersson González	16 February 1975 (aged 26)			(Colombia) América de Cali
17	MF	Juan Carlos Ramírez	22 March 1972 (aged 29)			(Colombia) Atlético Junior
18	FW	Jairo Castillo	17 November 1977 (aged 23)			(Argentina) Vélez Sársfield
19	MF	Freddy Grisales	22 September 1975 (aged 25)			(Colombia) Atlético Nacional
20	DF	Gerardo Bedoya	26 September 1975 (aged 25)			(Colombia) Deportivo Cali
21	MF	Óscar Díaz	6 June 1972 (aged 29)			(Colombia) Cortuluá
23	MF	Mauricio Molina	30 April 1980 (aged 21)			(Colombia) Envigado
24	MF	Giovanni Hernández	16 June 1976 (aged 25)			(Colombia) Deportivo Cali

=== Ecuador ===
Head coach: (Colombia) Hernán Darío Gómez

No.	Pos.	Player	Date of birth (age)	Caps	Goals	Club
1	GK	José Cevallos	17 April 1971 (aged 30)			(Ecuador) Barcelona
2	DF	Augusto Porozo	13 April 1974 (aged 27)			(Ecuador) Emelec
3	DF	Iván Hurtado	16 August 1974 (aged 26)			(Mexico) Tigres UANL
4	DF	Ulises de la Cruz	8 February 1974 (aged 27)			(Ecuador) Barcelona
5	MF	Juan Carlos Burbano	15 February 1969 (aged 32)			(Ecuador) El Nacional
6	DF	Raúl Guerrón	12 October 1976 (aged 24)			(Ecuador) Deportivo Quito
7	MF	Juan Aguinaga	4 January 1978 (aged 23)			(Ecuador) ESPOLI
8	FW	Ebelio Ordóñez	3 November 1973 (aged 27)			(Ecuador) El Nacional
9	FW	Félix Borja	2 April 1983 (aged 18)			(Ecuador) El Nacional
10	MF	Álex Aguinaga (c)	9 July 1968 (aged 33)			(Mexico) Necaxa
11	FW	Agustín Delgado	23 December 1974 (aged 26)			(Mexico) Necaxa
12	GK	Oswaldo Ibarra	8 September 1969 (aged 31)			(Ecuador) El Nacional
13	FW	Ángel Fernández	2 August 1971 (aged 29)			(Ecuador) El Nacional
14	DF	Walter Ayoví	11 August 1979 (aged 21)			(Ecuador) Emelec
15	MF	Marlon Ayoví	27 September 1971 (aged 29)			(Ecuador) Deportivo Quito
16	MF	Cléber Chalá	29 June 1971 (aged 30)			(Ecuador) El Nacional
17	DF	Giovanny Espinoza	12 April 1977 (aged 24)			(Ecuador) Aucas
18	DF	Alfonso Obregón	12 May 1972 (aged 29)			(Ecuador) Delfin
19	MF	Édison Méndez	16 March 1979 (aged 22)			(Ecuador) Deportivo Quito
20	MF	Edwin Tenorio	16 June 1976 (aged 25)			(Ecuador) Aucas
21	MF	Wellington Sánchez	19 June 1974 (aged 27)			(Ecuador) Emelec
23	DF	Jorge Guagua	28 September 1981 (aged 19)			(Ecuador) El Nacional

=== Venezuela ===
Head coach: Richard Páez

No.	Pos.	Player	Date of birth (age)	Caps	Goals	Club
1	GK	Rafael Dudamel	7 January 1973 (aged 28)			(Colombia) Deportivo Cali
2	DF	Luis Vallenilla	13 March 1974 (aged 27)			(Venezuela) Caracas
3	DF	José Manuel Rey	20 May 1975 (aged 26)			(Venezuela) Caracas
4	DF	Wilfredo Alvarado	4 October 1970 (aged 30)			(Venezuela) Nacional Táchira
5	MF	Miguel Mea Vitali	19 February 1981 (aged 20)			(Spain) Lleida
6	DF	Elvis Martínez	4 October 1970 (aged 30)			(Venezuela) Deportivo Táchira
7	FW	Daniel Noriega	30 March 1977 (aged 24)			(Argentina) Unión de Santa Fe
8	MF	Luis Vera (c)	9 March 1973 (aged 28)			(Venezuela) Caracas
9	FW	Alexander Rondón	30 August 1977 (aged 23)			(Venezuela) Caracas
10	MF	Gabriel Urdaneta	7 January 1976 (aged 25)			(Switzerland) Luzern
11	MF	Ricardo Páez	9 February 1979 (aged 22)			(Venezuela) Deportivo Táchira
12	GK	Manuel Sanhouse	16 July 1975 (aged 25)			(Venezuela) Caracas
13	DF	Leonel Vielma	30 August 1978 (aged 22)			(Venezuela) Estudiantes de Mérida
14	MF	Leopoldo Jiménez	22 May 1978 (aged 23)			(Venezuela) Deportivo Italchacao
15	MF	Giovanni Pérez	14 October 1974 (aged 26)			(Venezuela) Deportivo Italchacao
16	FW	Cristian Cásseres	29 June 1977 (aged 24)			(Mexico) La Piedad
17	MF	Jorge Rojas	10 January 1977 (aged 24)			(Venezuela) Caracas
18	MF	Juan Arango	16 May 1980 (aged 21)			(Mexico) Monterrey
19	DF	Rafael Mea Vitali	17 February 1975 (aged 26)			(Venezuela) Caracas
20	MF	Héctor Gonzalez	11 April 1977 (aged 24)			(Venezuela) Caracas
22	GK	Renny Vega	4 July 1979 (aged 22)			(Venezuela) Nacional Táchira

== Group B ==
=== Brazil ===
Head coach: Luiz Felipe Scolari

No.	Pos.	Player	Date of birth (age)	Caps	Goals	Club
1	GK	Marcos	4 August 1973 (aged 27)			(Brazil) Palmeiras
2	DF	Juliano Belletti	20 June 1976 (aged 25)			(Brazil) São Paulo
3	DF	Cris	3 June 1977 (aged 24)			(Brazil) Cruzeiro
4	DF	Roque Júnior	31 August 1976 (aged 24)			(Italy) Milan
5	MF	Eduardo Costa	23 September 1982 (aged 18)			(Brazil) Grêmio
6	DF	Roger	25 April 1975 (aged 26)			(Brazil) Grêmio
7	MF	Geovanni	11 January 1980 (aged 21)			(Brazil) Cruzeiro
8	MF	Emerson (c)	4 April 1976 (aged 25)			(Italy) Roma
9	FW	Guilherme Alves	8 May 1974 (aged 27)			(Brazil) Atlético Mineiro
10	MF	Juninho Paulista	22 February 1973 (aged 28)			(Brazil) Vasco da Gama
11	MF	Denílson	24 August 1977 (aged 23)			(Spain) Real Betis
12	GK	Dida	7 October 1973 (aged 27)			(Italy) Milan
13	DF	Alessandro	21 September 1977 (aged 23)			(Brazil) Atlético Paranaense
14	DF	Luisão	13 February 1981 (aged 20)			(Brazil) Cruzeiro
15	DF	Juan	1 February 1979 (aged 22)			(Brazil) Flamengo
16	DF	Júnior	20 June 1973 (aged 28)			(Italy) Parma
17	MF	Juninho Pernambucano	30 January 1975 (aged 26)			(Brazil) Vasco da Gama
18	MF	Fábio Rochemback	10 December 1981 (aged 19)			(Brazil) Internacional
19	MF	Fernando Menegazzo	3 May 1981 (aged 20)			(Brazil) Juventude
20	MF	Alex	14 September 1977 (aged 23)			(Brazil) Palmeiras
21	FW	Ewerthon	10 June 1981 (aged 20)			(Brazil) Corinthians
22	FW	Mário Jardel	18 September 1973 (aged 27)			(Turkey) Galatasaray

=== Mexico ===
Head coach: Javier Aguirre

No.	Pos.	Player	Date of birth (age)	Caps	Club
1	GK	Oswaldo Sánchez	21 September 1973 (aged 27)		(Mexico) Guadalajara
2	DF	Alberto Rodríguez	1 April 1974 (aged 27)		(Mexico) Pachuca
3	DF	Heriberto Morales	10 March 1975 (aged 26)		(Mexico) Monarcas Morelia
4	DF	Rafael Márquez	13 February 1979 (aged 22)		(France) Monaco
5	DF	Manuel Vidrio	23 August 1972 (aged 28)		(Mexico) Pachuca
6	MF	Gerardo Torrado	30 April 1979 (aged 22)		(Spain) Tenerife
7	DF	Octavio Valdez	7 December 1973 (aged 27)		(Mexico) Pachuca
8	MF	Alberto García Aspe (c)	11 May 1967 (aged 34)		(Mexico) Puebla
9	FW	Jared Borgetti	14 August 1973 (aged 27)		(Mexico) Santos
10	MF	Cesáreo Victorino	19 March 1979 (aged 22)		(Mexico) Pachuca
11	FW	Daniel Osorno	16 March 1979 (aged 22)		(Mexico) Atlas
12	GK	Óscar Pérez	1 February 1973 (aged 28)		(Mexico) Cruz Azul
13	MF	Sigifredo Mercado	21 December 1968 (aged 32)		(Mexico) León
14	FW	Antonio de Nigris	1 April 1978 (aged 23)		(Mexico) Monterrey
15	MF	Juan Pablo Rodríguez	7 August 1979 (aged 21)		(Mexico) Atlas
16	MF	Joaquín Reyes	20 February 1978 (aged 23)		(Mexico) Santos
17	DF	Ignacio Hierro	22 June 1978 (aged 23)		(Mexico) Atlante
18	MF	Johan Rodríguez	15 August 1975 (aged 25)		(Mexico) Santos
19	FW	Miguel Zepeda	25 May 1976 (aged 25)		(Mexico) Atlas
20	FW	Ramón Morales	10 October 1975 (aged 25)		(Mexico) Guadalajara
21	MF	Jesús Arellano	8 May 1973 (aged 28)		(Mexico) Monterrey
22	GK	Adrián Martínez	7 June 1973 (aged 28)		(Mexico) Santos

=== Paraguay ===
Head coach: (Uruguay) Sergio Markarián

No.	Pos.	Player	Date of birth (age)	Caps	Goals	Club
1	GK	Ricardo Tavarelli	7 January 1973 (aged 28)			(Paraguay) Olimpia
2	DF	Néstor Isasi	9 April 1972 (aged 29)			(Paraguay) Guaraní
3	DF	Dani Cáceres (c)	6 October 1973 (aged 27)			(Paraguay) Cerro Porteño
4	MF	Alfredo Amarilla	7 October 1972 (aged 28)			(Paraguay) Sportivo Luqueño
5	DF	Daniel Sanabria	8 February 1972 (aged 29)			(Paraguay) Libertad
6	MF	Estanislao Struway	25 June 1968 (aged 33)			(Paraguay) Cerro Porteño
7	MF	Edgar Robles	25 November 1977 (aged 23)			(Paraguay) Libertad
8	MF	Gustavo Morínigo	23 January 1977 (aged 24)			(Paraguay) Libertad
9	FW	Miguel Ángel Cáceres	6 June 1978 (aged 23)			(Spain) Levante
10	MF	Guido Alvarenga	24 August 1970 (aged 30)			(Paraguay) Cerro Porteño
11	FW	Virgilio Ferreira	24 August 1970 (aged 30)			(Paraguay) Cerro Porteño
12	GK	Justo Villar	30 June 1977 (aged 24)			(Paraguay) Libertad
13	MF	Luis Núñez	3 May 1980 (aged 21)			(Paraguay) Sportivo Luqueño
14	DF	Pánfilo Escobar	7 September 1974 (aged 26)			(Paraguay) Sportivo Luqueño
15	DF	Darío Verón	26 July 1979 (aged 21)			(Paraguay) Guaraní
16	MF	Julio César Enciso	5 August 1974 (aged 26)			(Paraguay) Olimpia
17	MF	Silvio Garay	20 September 1973 (aged 27)			(Paraguay) Cerro Porteño
18	DF	Pedro Benítez	23 March 1981 (aged 20)			(Paraguay) Sportivo Luqueño
19	MF	Emilio Martínez	10 April 1981 (aged 20)			(Paraguay) Cerro Porteño
20	FW	Julio González	26 August 1981 (aged 19)			(Paraguay) Guaraní
21	DF	Denis Caniza	29 August 1974 (aged 26)			(Argentina) Lanús
22	FW	Arístides Masi	14 January 1977 (aged 24)			(Paraguay) Sportivo Luqueño

=== Peru ===
Head coach: Julio César Uribe

No.	Pos.	Player	Date of birth (age)	Caps	Goals	Club
1	GK	Óscar Ibáñez	8 August 1967 (aged 33)			(Peru) Universitario
2	DF	Wálter Zevallos	15 April 1973 (aged 28)			(Peru) Alianza Lima
3	DF	José Soto	11 January 1970 (aged 31)			(Peru) Alianza Lima
4	DF	Martín Hidalgo	15 June 1976 (aged 25)			(Peru) Sporting Cristal
5	DF	Juan Pajuelo	23 September 1974 (aged 26)			(Argentina) Club Atlético Los Andes
6	DF	Juan Francisco Hernández	24 June 1978 (aged 23)			(Peru) Juan Aurich
7	FW	Abel Lobatón	23 November 1977 (aged 23)			(Peru) Universitario
8	MF	Juan Jayo (c)	20 January 1973 (aged 28)			(Spain) Celta de Vigo
10	MF	Édson Uribe	9 May 1982 (aged 19)			(Uruguay) Deportivo Maldonado
11	FW	Darío Muchotrigo	17 December 1970 (aged 30)			(Greece) Ionikos
12	GK	Marco Flores	29 May 1977 (aged 24)			(Peru) Alianza Lima
14	MF	Jorge Soto	27 October 1971 (aged 29)			(Peru) Sporting Cristal
15	DF	Santiago Salazar	2 November 1975 (aged 25)			(Peru) Sporting Cristal
16	MF	Pedro García	4 March 1974 (aged 27)			(Peru) Alianza Atlético
18	FW	Roberto Holsen	10 August 1976 (aged 24)			(Peru) Alianza Lima
19	DF	Walter Vílchez	20 February 1982 (aged 19)			(Peru) Unión Minas
20	MF	José del Solar	28 November 1967 (aged 33)			(Belgium) Mechelen
21	GK	Francisco Bazán	10 October 1980 (aged 20)			(Peru) Deportivo Wanka
23	MF	Luis Hernández	15 February 1981 (aged 20)			(Peru) Alianza Lima
24	MF	Gustavo Tempone	14 April 1970 (aged 31)			(Peru) Sport Boys
25	FW	Pedro Ascoy	10 August 1980 (aged 20)			(Peru) Juan Aurich

== Group C ==
=== Bolivia ===
Head coach: Carlos Aragonés

No.	Pos.	Player	Date of birth (age)	Caps	Goals	Club
1	GK	Carlos Erwin Arias	18 February 1980 (aged 21)			(Bolivia) Blooming
2	MF	José Loayza	9 September 1976 (aged 24)			(Bolivia) Jorge Wilstermann
3	DF	Marco Sandy	29 August 1971 (aged 29)			(Bolivia) Bolívar
4	DF	Percy Colque	23 October 1976 (aged 24)			(Bolivia) The Strongest
5	DF	Marcelo Carballo	7 December 1974 (aged 26)			(Bolivia) Jorge Wilstermann
6	MF	Raúl Justiniano	29 September 1977 (aged 23)			(Bolivia) Blooming
7	DF	Luis Gatty Ribeiro	1 November 1979 (aged 21)			(Bolivia) Bolívar
8	MF	Franz Calustro	9 March 1974 (aged 27)			(Bolivia) Oriente Petrolero
9	FW	Joaquín Botero	10 December 1977 (aged 23)			(Bolivia) Bolívar
10	MF	Julio César Baldivieso (c)	2 December 1971 (aged 29)			(Chile) Cobreloa
11	FW	Líder Paz	2 December 1974 (aged 26)			(Bolivia) The Strongest
12	GK	Hamlet Barrientos	8 January 1978 (aged 23)			(Bolivia) The Strongest
13	MF	Wilson Escalante	6 May 1977 (aged 24)			(Bolivia) Oriente Petrolero
14	MF	Ronald García	17 December 1980 (aged 20)			(Bolivia) Bolívar
15	DF	Lorgio Álvarez	29 June 1978 (aged 23)			(Bolivia) Blooming
16	DF	Ronald Raldes	20 April 1981 (aged 20)			(Bolivia) Oriente Petrolero
17	DF	Eduardo Jiguchi	24 August 1970 (aged 30)			(Bolivia) Jorge Wilstermann
18	MF	Limberg Gutiérrez	19 November 1977 (aged 23)			(Uruguay) Nacional
19	FW	Milton Coimbra	4 May 1975 (aged 26)			(Bolivia) Oriente Petrolero
20	MF	Gonzalo Galindo	20 October 1974 (aged 26)			(Bolivia) Jorge Wilstermann
21	MF	Richard Rojas	27 February 1975 (aged 26)			(Bolivia) The Strongest
22	FW	Roger Suárez	2 April 1977 (aged 24)			(Bolivia) Oriente Petrolero

=== Costa Rica ===
Head coach: Alexandre Guimarães

No.	Pos.	Player	Date of birth (age)	Caps	Club
1	GK	Erick Lonnis	9 September 1965 (aged 35)		(Costa Rica) Saprissa
2	DF	Jervis Drummond	8 September 1976 (aged 24)		(Costa Rica) Saprissa
3	DF	Luis Marín	10 August 1974 (aged 26)		(Costa Rica) Alajuelense
4	DF	Rónald González (c)	8 August 1970 (aged 30)		(Guatemala) Comunicaciones
5	DF	Gilberto Martínez	1 October 1979 (aged 21)		(Costa Rica) Saprissa
6	MF	Wílmer López	3 August 1971 (aged 29)		(Costa Rica) Alajuelense
7	FW	Rolando Fonseca	6 June 1974 (aged 27)		(Costa Rica) Saprissa
8	DF	Mauricio Solís	13 December 1972 (aged 28)		(Costa Rica) Alajuelense
9	FW	Paulo Wanchope	31 July 1976 (aged 24)		(England) Manchester City
10	MF	Walter Centeno	6 October 1974 (aged 26)		(Costa Rica) Saprissa
11	FW	Rónald Gómez	24 January 1975 (aged 26)		(Greece) OFI Crete
12	MF	Robert Arias	18 March 1980 (aged 21)		(Costa Rica) Herediano
14	DF	Austin Berry	5 April 1971 (aged 30)		(Costa Rica) Herediano
15	DF	Harold Wallace	7 September 1975 (aged 25)		(Costa Rica) Alajuelense
16	MF	Steven Bryce	16 August 1977 (aged 23)		(Costa Rica) Alajuelense
17	MF	Hernán Medford	23 May 1968 (aged 33)		(Mexico) Necaxa
18	GK	Lester Morgan	2 May 1976 (aged 25)		(Costa Rica) Herediano
19	MF	Rodrigo Cordero	4 December 1973 (aged 27)		(Costa Rica) Herediano
20	FW	William Sunsing	12 May 1977 (aged 24)		(United States) New England Revolution
21	DF	Reynaldo Parks	4 December 1974 (aged 26)		(Mexico) Tecos
22	DF	Carlos Castro	10 September 1978 (aged 22)		(Costa Rica) Alajuelense
23	GK	Ricardo González	6 March 1974 (aged 27)		(Costa Rica) Alajuelense

=== Honduras ===
Head coach: Ramón Maradiaga

No.	Pos.	Player	Date of birth (age)	Caps	Goals	Club
1	GK	Henry Enamorado	5 August 1977 (aged 23)			(National Autonomous Federation of Football of Honduras) Pumas UNAH
2	DF	Hesler Phillips	18 November 1978 (aged 22)			(National Autonomous Federation of Football of Honduras) Pumas UNAH
3	DF	David Cárcamo	2 August 1970 (aged 30)			(National Autonomous Federation of Football of Honduras) Victoria
4	DF	Samuel Caballero	24 December 1974 (aged 26)			(National Autonomous Federation of Football of Honduras) Olimpia
5	MF	Milton Reyes	2 May 1974 (aged 27)			(National Autonomous Federation of Football of Honduras) Motagua
6	MF	Óscar Lagos	17 June 1973 (aged 28)			(National Autonomous Federation of Football of Honduras) Motagua
7	FW	David Suazo	5 November 1979 (aged 21)			(Italy) Cagliari
8	FW	Marvin Brown	11 May 1974 (aged 27)			(National Autonomous Federation of Football of Honduras) Vida
10	MF	Julio César de León	13 September 1979 (aged 21)			(National Autonomous Federation of Football of Honduras) Olimpia
13	MF	Robel Bernárdez	8 June 1972 (aged 29)			(National Autonomous Federation of Football of Honduras) Motagua
14	MF	Mario César Rodríguez	31 July 1975 (aged 25)			(National Autonomous Federation of Football of Honduras) Victoria
15	MF	Ricky García	27 July 1971 (aged 29)			(National Autonomous Federation of Football of Honduras) Victoria
16	MF	Reynaldo Pineda	6 August 1978 (aged 22)			(National Autonomous Federation of Football of Honduras) Savio
17	DF	Carlos Güity	3 March 1974 (aged 27)			(National Autonomous Federation of Football of Honduras) Vida
18	FW	Saúl Martínez	29 January 1976 (aged 25)			(National Autonomous Federation of Football of Honduras) Motagua
19	MF	Danilo Turcios	8 May 1978 (aged 23)			(Uruguay) Deportivo Maldonado
20	MF	Amado Guevara (c)	2 May 1976 (aged 25)			(Mexico) Toros Neza
21	DF	Limber Pérez	26 July 1976 (aged 24)			(National Autonomous Federation of Football of Honduras) Pumas UNAH
22	GK	Noel Valladares	3 May 1977 (aged 24)			(National Autonomous Federation of Football of Honduras) Motagua
23	DF	Júnior Izaguirre	12 August 1979 (aged 21)			(National Autonomous Federation of Football of Honduras) Motagua
24	DF	Ninrrol Medina	26 August 1976 (aged 24)			(Mexico) Tigrillos Saltillo
26	DF	Leonardo Morales	8 October 1975 (aged 25)			(National Autonomous Federation of Football of Honduras) Vida

=== Uruguay ===
Head coach: Víctor Púa

No.	Pos.	Player	Date of birth (age)	Caps	Goals	Club
1	GK	Gustavo Munúa	27 January 1978 (aged 23)			(Uruguay) Nacional de Football
2	DF	Joe Bizera	17 May 1980 (aged 21)			(Uruguay) Peñarol
3	DF	Gonzalo Sorondo (c)	9 October 1979 (aged 21)			(Uruguay) Defensor Sporting
4	DF	Carlos Díaz	4 February 1979 (aged 22)			(Uruguay) Defensor Sporting
5	MF	Diego Pérez	18 May 1980 (aged 21)			(Uruguay) Defensor Sporting
6	DF	Pablo Lima	26 April 1981 (aged 20)			(Uruguay) Danubio
7	MF	Christian Callejas	17 May 1978 (aged 23)			(Uruguay) Danubio
8	MF	Andrés Martínez	16 October 1972 (aged 28)			(Uruguay) Defensor Sporting
9	MF	Rodrigo Lemos	3 October 1973 (aged 27)			(Uruguay) Bella Vista
10	MF	Rubén Olivera	4 May 1983 (aged 18)			(Uruguay) Danubio
11	FW	Walter Guglielmone	11 April 1978 (aged 23)			(Uruguay) Montevideo Wanderers
12	GK	Adrián Berbia	12 October 1977 (aged 23)			(Uruguay) Peñarol
13	DF	Carlos Gutiérrez	25 December 1976 (aged 24)			(Uruguay) River Plate
14	DF	Alejandro Curbelo	19 September 1973 (aged 27)			(Uruguay) Montevideo Wanderers
15	FW	Carlos María Morales	1 March 1970 (aged 31)			(Mexico) Toluca
16	DF	Jorge Anchén	17 August 1980 (aged 20)			(Uruguay) Danubio
17	DF	Julio Pablo Rodríguez	9 August 1977 (aged 23)			(Uruguay) Huracán Buceo
18	MF	Fabián Estoyanoff	27 September 1982 (aged 18)			(Uruguay) Fénix
19	FW	Javier Chevantón	12 August 1980 (aged 20)			(Uruguay) Danubio
20	FW	Richard Morales	21 February 1975 (aged 26)			(Uruguay) Nacional de Football
21	MF	Sebastián Eguren	8 January 1981 (aged 20)			(Uruguay) Montevideo Wanderers
22	MF	Claudio Dadómo	10 February 1982 (aged 19)			(Uruguay) Montevideo Wanderers

== Withdrawn teams ==
=== Argentina ===
Argentine squad was revealed on 16 June 2001. The team ultimately withdrew from the tournament on 10 July and were replaced by Honduras.

Head coach: Marcelo Bielsa

No.	Pos.	Player	Date of birth (age)	Caps	Goals	Club
	GK	Roberto Bonano	24 January 1970 (aged 31)			(Argentina) River Plate
	GK	Pablo Cavallero	13 April 1974 (aged 27)			(Spain) Celta de Vigo
	DF	Facundo Quiroga	10 January 1978 (aged 23)			(Italy) Napoli
	DF	Roberto Sensini	12 October 1966 (aged 34)			(Italy) Parma
	DF	Eduardo Berizzo	13 November 1969 (aged 31)			(Spain) Celta de Vigo
	DF	Mauricio Pochettino	2 March 1972 (aged 29)			(France) Paris Saint-Germain
	DF	Diego Placente	24 April 1977 (aged 24)			(Germany) Bayer Leverkusen
	DF	Nelson Vivas	18 October 1969 (aged 31)			(England) Arsenal
	DF	Javier Zanetti	10 August 1973 (aged 27)			(Italy) Inter Milan
	MF	Matías Almeyda	21 December 1973 (aged 27)			(Italy) Parma
	MF	Claudio Husaín	20 November 1974 (aged 26)			(Italy) Napoli
	MF	Pablo Aimar	3 November 1979 (aged 21)			(Spain) Valencia
	MF	Santiago Solari	7 October 1976 (aged 24)			(Spain) Real Madrid
	MF	Esteban Cambiasso	18 August 1980 (aged 20)			(Argentina) Independiente
	MF	Marcelo Gallardo	18 January 1976 (aged 25)			(France) Monaco
	FW	Luciano Galletti	9 April 1980 (aged 21)			(Argentina) Estudiantes
	MF	Ariel Ortega	4 March 1974 (aged 27)			(Argentina) River Plate
	FW	Julio Cruz	10 October 1974 (aged 26)			(Italy) Bologna
	FW	Claudio López	17 July 1974 (aged 26)			(Italy) Lazio
	FW	Juan Esnáider	5 March 1973 (aged 28)			(Spain) Zaragoza

=== Canada ===
Canada squad was revealed on 26 June 2001. The team ultimately withdrew from the tournament on 1 July and were replaced by Costa Rica.

Head coach: (Germany) Holger Osieck

No.	Pos.	Player	Date of birth (age)	Caps	Goals	Club
1	GK	Craig Forrest	20 September 1967 (aged 33)			(England) West Ham
2	DF	Paul Fenwick	25 August 1969 (aged 31)			(Scotland) Hibernian
3	DF	Mark Watson	8 September 1970 (aged 30)			(United States) D.C. United
4	DF	Tony Menezes	24 November 1974 (aged 26)			(Brazil) Botafogo
5	DF	Jason de Vos	2 January 1974 (aged 27)			(Scotland) Dundee United
6	MF	Jason Bent	8 March 1977 (aged 24)			(England) Preston North End
7	MF	Paul Stalteri	18 October 1977 (aged 23)			(Germany) Werder Bremen
8	MF	Nick Dasovic	5 December 1968 (aged 32)			(Scotland) St Johnstone
9	FW	Carlo Corazzin	25 December 1971 (aged 29)			(England) Oldham Athletic
10	FW	Davide Xausa	10 March 1976 (aged 25)			(Scotland) Livingston
11	DF	Jim Brennan	8 May 1977 (aged 24)			(England) Huddersfield
12	GK	Lars Hirschfeld	17 October 1978 (aged 22)			(Canada) Calgary Storm
13	DF	Carl Fletcher	26 December 1971 (aged 29)			(Canada) Montreal Impact
14	MF	Daniel Imhof	22 November 1977 (aged 23)			(Switzerland) St. Gallen
15	DF	Richard Hastings	18 May 1977 (aged 24)			(Scotland) Inverness CT
17	FW	Dwayne De Rosario	15 May 1978 (aged 23)			(United States) San Jose Earthquakes
19	FW	Paul Peschisolido	25 May 1971 (aged 30)			(England) Norwich
20	DF	Kevin McKenna	21 January 1980 (aged 21)			(Scotland) Heart of Midlothian
22	MF	Jeff Clarke	18 October 1977 (aged 23)			(United States) Portland Timbers
