= 2001 Copa América Group B =

Group B of the 2001 Copa América was one of the three groups of competing nations in the 2001 Copa América. It comprised Brazil, Mexico, Paraguay, and Peru. Group play ran from 12 to 18 July 2001.

Brazil won the group and faced Honduras, the runners-up of Group C, in the quarter-finals. Mexico finished second and faced Chile—the runners-up of Group A—in the quarter-finals. Peru finished third and faced Colombia, the winners of Group A, in the quarter-final. Paraguay finished fourth in the group, and were eliminated from the tournament.

== Standings ==
Team	Pld	W	D	L	GF	GA	GD	Pts
Brazil	3	2	0	1	5	2	+3	6
Mexico	3	1	1	1	1	1	0	4
Peru	3	1	1	1	4	5	−1	4
Paraguay	3	0	2	1	4	6	−2	2

Teams that advanced to the quarter-finals
- Group winners
- Group runners-up
- Best two third-placed teams among all groups

All times are in local, Colombia Time (UTC−05:00).

== Matches ==
=== Peru vs Paraguay ===
12 July 2001
17:30

Peru	3–3	Paraguay
Lobatón 16'; Pajuelo 57'; Del Solar 72'	Report	Ferreira 23', 64'; Garay 90'

Estadio Pascual Guerrero, Cali
Attendance: 35,000
Referee: Ángel Sánchez (Argentina)

Peru	Paraguay

GK	1	Óscar Ibáñez
DF	3	José Soto
DF	15	Santiago Salazar
DF	5	Juan Pajuelo	(yellow card) 18'
DF	4	Martín Hidalgo	(yellow card) 35'
MF	14	Jorge Soto		(substituted off) 68'
MF	8	Juan Jayo
MF	20	José del Solar	(yellow card) (yellow-red card) 79'
MF	24	Gustavo Tempone		(substituted off) 68'
FW	7	Abel Lobatón	(yellow card) 42'	(substituted off) 76'
FW	11	Darío Muchotrigo
Substitutions:
MF	10	Édson Uribe		(substituted on) 68'
FW	25	Pedro Ascoy		(substituted on) 68'
FW	18	Roberto Holsen		(substituted on) 76'
Manager:
Julio César Uribe

GK	1	Ricardo Tavarelli
DF	2	Néstor Isasi	(yellow card) 21'
DF	3	Dani Cáceres
DF	21	Denis Caniza	(red card) 57'
DF	5	Daniel Sanabria
MF	16	Julio César Enciso
MF	7	Edgar Robles		(substituted off) 46'
MF	6	Estanislao Struway	(yellow card) 12'	(substituted off) 59'
MF	8	Gustavo Morínigo		(substituted off) 50'
MF	10	Guido Alvarenga
FW	11	Virgilio Ferreira
Substitutions:
FW	20	Julio González		(substituted on) 46'
MF	17	Silvio Garay		(substituted on) 50'
MF	4	Alfredo Amarilla		(substituted on) 59'
Manager:
(Uruguay) Sergio Markarián

=== Brazil vs Mexico ===
12 July 2001
19:45

Brazil	0–1	Mexico
	Report	Borgetti 5'

Estadio Pascual Guerrero, Cali
Attendance: 38,000
Referee: Óscar Ruiz (Colombia)

Brazil	Mexico

GK	1	Marcos
DF	13	Alessandro		(substituted off) 63'
DF	3	Cris
DF	4	Roque Júnior	(yellow card) 71'
DF	6	Roger
MF	18	Fábio Rochemback	(yellow card) 30'
MF	8	Emerson	(yellow card) 36'
MF	20	Alex
MF	10	Juninho Paulista		(substituted off) 46'
MF	7	Geovanni
FW	22	Mário Jardel		(substituted off) 46'
Substitutions:
FW	9	Guilherme		(substituted on) 46'
MF	11	Denílson		(substituted on) 46'
MF	17	Juninho Pernambucano		(substituted on) 63'
Manager:
Luiz Felipe Scolari

GK	12	Óscar Pérez
DF	5	Manuel Vidrio
DF	4	Rafael Márquez
DF	3	Heriberto Morales	(yellow card) 32'
MF	21	Jesús Arellano
MF	6	Gerardo Torrado
MF	8	Alberto García Aspe
MF	18	Johan Rodríguez	(yellow card) 61'	(substituted off) 80'
MF	19	Miguel Zepeda		(substituted off) 80'
MF	20	Ramón Morales	(yellow card) 75'
FW	9	Jared Borgetti
Substitutions:
FW	11	Daniel Osorno		(substituted on) 80'
MF	13	Sigifredo Mercado		(substituted on) 80'
Manager:
Javier Aguirre

=== Brazil vs Peru ===
15 July 2001
16:00

Brazil	2–0	Peru
Guilherme 9'; Denílson 85'	Report

Estadio Pascual Guerrero, Cali
Attendance: 30,000
Referee: Jorge Larrionda (Uruguay)

Brazil	Peru

GK	1	Marcos
DF	2	Juliano Belletti
DF	15	Juan
DF	3	Cris
DF	16	Júnior
DF	4	Roque Júnior
MF	5	Eduardo Costa	(yellow card) 27'
MF	8	Emerson		(substituted off) 58'
MF	20	Alex		(substituted off) 62'
FW	21	Ewerthon
FW	9	Guilherme		(substituted off) 70'
Substitutions:
MF	17	Juninho Pernambucano		(substituted on) 58'
MF	10	Juninho Paulista		(substituted on) 62'
MF	11	Denílson	(yellow card) 90'	(substituted on) 70'
Manager:
Luiz Felipe Scolari

GK	1	Óscar Ibáñez
DF	3	José Soto
DF	15	Santiago Salazar	(red card) 67'
DF	5	Juan Pajuelo
DF	4	Martín Hidalgo
MF	14	Jorge Soto
MF	8	Juan Jayo
MF	23	Luis Hernández	(yellow card) 43'	(substituted off) 46'
MF	16	Pedro García		(substituted off) 60'
FW	11	Darío Muchotrigo
FW	7	Abel Lobatón		(substituted off) 69'
Substitutions:
DF	2	Wálter Zevallos		(substituted on) 46'
FW	18	Roberto Holsen		(substituted on) 60'
DF	6	Juan Francisco Hernández		(substituted on) 69'
Manager:
Julio César Uribe

=== Paraguay vs Mexico ===
15 July 2001
18:15

Paraguay	0–0	Mexico
	Report

Estadio Pascual Guerrero, Cali
Attendance: 40,000
Referee: Roger Zambrano (Ecuador)

Paraguay	Mexico

GK	1	Ricardo Tavarelli
DF	2	Néstor Isasi	(yellow card) 68'
DF	3	Dani Cáceres
DF	5	Daniel Sanabria
DF	14	Pánfilo Escobar
MF	6	Estanislao Struway		(substituted off) 76'
MF	7	Edgar Robles		(substituted off) 46'
MF	10	Guido Alvarenga
MF	16	Julio César Enciso
MF	17	Silvio Garay		(substituted off) 46'
FW	11	Virgilio Ferreira
Substitutions:
MF	4	Alfredo Amarilla	(yellow card) 48'	(substituted on) 46'
FW	9	Miguel Ángel Cáceres		(substituted on) 46'
FW	20	Julio González		(substituted on) 76'
Manager:
(Uruguay) Sergio Markarián

GK	22	Adrián Martínez
DF	2	Alberto Rodríguez
DF	5	Manuel Vidrio
DF	4	Rafael Márquez
DF	17	Ignacio Hierro	(yellow card) 66'
MF	7	Octavio Valdez		(substituted off) 46'
MF	13	Sigifredo Mercado	(yellow card) 34'
MF	8	Alberto García Aspe
MF	10	Cesáreo Victorino
FW	11	Daniel Osorno		(substituted off) 51'
FW	14	Antonio de Nigris		(substituted off) 64'
Substitutions:
MF	20	Ramón Morales		(substituted on) 46'
MF	15	Julio Rodríguez		(substituted on) 51'
FW	9	Jared Borgetti		(substituted on) 64'
Manager:
Javier Aguirre

=== Peru vs Mexico ===
18 July 2001
17:30

Peru	1–0	Mexico
Holsen 48'	Report

Estadio Pascual Guerrero, Cali
Attendance: 20,000
Referee: René Ortubé (Bolivia)

Peru	Mexico

GK	1	Óscar Ibáñez	(yellow card) 89'
DF	2	Wálter Zevallos		(substituted off) 46'
DF	3	José Soto
DF	4	Martín Hidalgo	(yellow card) 18'
DF	5	Juan Pajuelo
MF	8	Juan Jayo
MF	20	José del Solar
MF	14	Jorge Soto
FW	11	Darío Muchotrigo	(red card) 62'
FW	18	Roberto Holsen		(substituted off) 89'
FW	7	Abel Lobatón	(yellow card) 55'	(substituted off) 63'
Substitutions:
MF	16	Pedro García		(substituted on) 46'
MF	24	Gustavo Tempone	(yellow card) 65'	(substituted on) 63'
FW	25	Pedro Ascoy		(substituted on) 89'
Manager:
Julio César Uribe

GK	1	Oswaldo Sánchez
DF	2	Alberto Rodríguez
DF	5	Manuel Vidrio
DF	3	Heriberto Morales
MF	20	Ramón Morales
MF	6	Gerardo Torrado
MF	16	Joaquín Reyes		(substituted off) 46'
MF	15	Julio Rodríguez		(substituted off) 46'
MF	21	Jesús Arellano	(yellow card) 55'
MF	10	Cesáreo Victorino		(substituted off) 65'
FW	9	Jared Borgetti	(yellow card) 53' (red card) 62'
Substitutions:
MF	13	Sigifredo Mercado		(substituted on) 46'
MF	19	Miguel Zepeda		(substituted on) 46'
FW	14	Antonio de Nigris		(substituted on) 65'
Manager:
Javier Aguirre

=== Brazil vs Paraguay ===
18 July 2001
19:45

Brazil	3–1	Paraguay
Alex 60'; Belletti 89'; Denílson 90'	Report	Alvarenga 11' (pen.)

Estadio Pascual Guerrero, Cali
Attendance: 40,000
Referee: Ángel Sánchez (Argentina)

Brazil	Paraguay

GK	1	Marcos
DF	2	Juliano Belletti
DF	15	Juan
DF	4	Roque Júnior	(yellow card) 54' (yellow-red card) 58'
DF	3	Cris
DF	16	Júnior	(yellow card) 50'
MF	5	Eduardo Costa		(substituted off) 55'
MF	8	Emerson
MF	20	Alex		(substituted off) 65'
FW	21	Ewerthon		(substituted off) 44'
FW	9	Guilherme
Substitutions:
MF	11	Denílson		(substituted on) 44'
MF	17	Juninho Pernambucano		(substituted on) 55'
MF	18	Fábio Rochemback	(yellow card) 78'	(substituted on) 65'
Manager:
Luiz Felipe Scolari

GK	1	Ricardo Tavarelli
DF	14	Pánfilo Escobar	(yellow card) 43'
DF	5	Daniel Sanabria
DF	3	Dani Cáceres
DF	21	Denis Caniza	(red card) 81'
MF	8	Gustavo Morínigo
MF	16	Julio César Enciso	(yellow card) 36'	(substituted off) 57'
MF	17	Silvio Garay	(yellow card) 52'
MF	10	Guido Alvarenga
FW	22	Arístides Masi		(substituted off) 64'
FW	11	Virgilio Ferreira		(substituted off) 75'
Substitutions:
MF	6	Estanislao Struway		(substituted on) 57'
FW	20	Julio González		(substituted on) 64'
MF	7	Edgar Robles		(substituted on) 75'
Manager:
(Uruguay) Sergio Markarián
