= Paraguay national football team results (2000–2019) =

This page details the match results and statistics of the Paraguay national football team from 2000 to 2019.

== Key ==
Key to matches

- Att.=Match attendance
- (H)=Home ground
- (A)=Away ground
- (N)=Neutral ground

Key to record by opponent

- Pld=Games played
- W=Games won
- D=Games drawn
- L=Games lost
- GF=Goals for
- GA=Goals against

== Results ==
Paraguay's score is shown first in each case.

Paraguay national football team results
| No. | Date | Venue | Opponents | Score | Competition | Paraguay scorers | Att. | Ref. |
|---|---|---|---|---|---|---|---|---|
| 478 | 29 March 2000 | Estadio Nacional, Lima (A) | Peru | 0–2 | 2002 FIFA World Cup qualification | | 45,042 | |
| 479 | 26 April 2000 | Estadio Defensores del Chaco, Asunción (H) | Uruguay | 1–0 | 2002 FIFA World Cup qualification | C. Ayala | 18,350 | |
| 480 | 3 June 2000 | Estadio Defensores del Chaco, Asunción (H) | Ecuador | 3–1 | 2002 FIFA World Cup qualification | Toledo, Brizuela (2) | 22,000 | |
| 481 | 9 June 2000 | Sydney Football Stadium, Sydney (A) | Australia | 0–0 | Friendly | | 9,000 | |
| 482 | 12 June 2000 | The Gabba, Brisbane (A) | Australia | 0–0 | Friendly | | — | |
| 483 | 15 June 2000 | Olympic Park Stadium, Melbourne (A) | Australia | 1–2 | Friendly | M. Cáceres | 7,500 | |
| 484 | 21 June 2000 | Estadio Antonio Oddone Sarubbi, Ciudad del Este (H) | Costa Rica | 1–0 | Friendly | Paredes | 7,500 | |
| 485 | 29 June 2000 | Estadio Nacional, Santiago (A) | Chile | 1–3 | 2002 FIFA World Cup qualification | J. Cardozo | 53,570 | |
| 486 | 18 July 2000 | Estadio Defensores del Chaco, Asunción (H) | Brazil | 2–1 | 2002 FIFA World Cup qualification | Paredes, Campos | 40,000 | |
| 487 | 27 July 2000 | Estadio Hernando Siles, La Paz (A) | Bolivia | 0–0 | 2002 FIFA World Cup qualification | | 39,142 | |
| 488 | 16 August 2000 | Estadio Monumental, Buenos Aires (A) | Argentina | 1–1 | 2002 FIFA World Cup qualification | Acuña | 46,000 | |
| 489 | 2 September 2000 | Estadio Defensores del Chaco, Asunción (H) | Venezuela | 3–0 | 2002 FIFA World Cup qualification | G. González, J. Cardozo, Paredes | 40,000 | |
| 490 | 7 October 2000 | Estadio El Campín, Bogotá (A) | Colombia | 2–0 | 2002 FIFA World Cup qualification | Santa Cruz, Chilavert | 42,330 | |
| 491 | 15 November 2000 | Estadio Defensores del Chaco, Asunción (H) | Peru | 5–1 | 2002 FIFA World Cup qualification | Santa Cruz, Del Solar (o.g.), J. Cardozo, Paredes, Chilavert | 30,000 | |
| 492 | 27 January 2001 | Hong Kong Stadium, Hong Kong (N) | South Korea | 1–1 (5–6p) | 2001 Lunar New Year Cup | Morínigo | 30,000 | |
| 493 | 28 March 2001 | Estadio Centenario, Montevideo (A) | Uruguay | 1–0 | 2002 FIFA World Cup qualification | Alvarenga | 50,000 | |
| 494 | 24 April 2001 | Estadio Olímpico Atahualpa, Quito (A) | Ecuador | 1–2 | 2002 FIFA World Cup qualification | J. Cardozo | 30,145 | |
| 495 | 2 June 2001 | Estadio Defensores del Chaco, Asunción (H) | Chile | 1–0 | 2002 FIFA World Cup qualification | Paredes | 35,000 | |
| 496 | 28 June 2001 | National Stadium, Tokyo (N) | FR Yugoslavia | 2–0 | 2001 Kirin Cup | D. Cáceres, Ferreira | 21,213 | |
| 497 | 1 July 2001 | Sapporo Dome, Sapporo (N) | Japan | 0–2 | 2001 Kirin Cup | | 39,073 | |
| 498 | 12 July 2001 | Estadio Pascual Guerrero, Cali (N) | Peru | 3–3 | 2001 Copa América | Ferreira, Garay | 35,000 | |
| 499 | 15 July 2001 | Estadio Pascual Guerrero, Cali (N) | Mexico | 0–0 | 2001 Copa América | | 40,000 | |
| 500 | 18 July 2001 | Estadio Pascual Guerrero, Cali (N) | Brazil | 1–3 | 2001 Copa América | Alvarenga | 40,000 | |
| 501 | 15 August 2001 | Estádio Olímpico Monumental, Porto Alegre (A) | Brazil | 0–2 | 2002 FIFA World Cup qualification | | 48,000 | |
| 502 | 5 September 2001 | Estadio Defensores del Chaco, Asunción (H) | Bolivia | 5–1 | 2002 FIFA World Cup qualification | Paredes, J. Cardozo (2), Chilavert, Santa Cruz | 25,000 | |
| 503 | 7 October 2001 | Estadio Defensores del Chaco, Asunción (H) | Argentina | 2–2 | 2002 FIFA World Cup qualification | Chilavert, Morínigo | 45,000 | |
| 504 | 8 November 2001 | Estadio Polideportivo de Pueblo Nuevo, San Cristóbal (A) | Venezuela | 1–3 | 2002 FIFA World Cup qualification | Arce | 22,500 | |
| 505 | 14 November 2001 | Estadio Defensores del Chaco, Asunción (H) | Colombia | 0–4 | 2002 FIFA World Cup qualification | | 25,000 | |
| 506 | 13 February 2002 | Estadio Antonio Oddone Sarubbi, Ciudad del Este (H) | Bolivia | 2–2 | Friendly | J. Cardozo, Struway | 22,000 | |
| 507 | 26 March 2002 | Loftus Road, London (N) | Nigeria | 1–1 | Friendly | Gamarra | 6,280 | |
| 508 | 17 April 2002 | Anfield, Liverpool (A) | England | 0–4 | Friendly | | 42,713 | |
| 509 | 17 May 2002 | Råsunda Stadium, Solna (A) | Sweden | 2–1 | Friendly | Santa Cruz, Paredes | 33,103 | |
| 510 | 2 June 2002 | Busan Asiad Main Stadium, Busan (N) | South Africa | 2–2 | 2002 FIFA World Cup | Santa Cruz, Arce | 25,186 | |
| 511 | 7 June 2002 | Jeonju World Cup Stadium, Jeonju (N) | Spain | 1–3 | 2002 FIFA World Cup | Puyol (o.g.) | 24,000 | |
| 512 | 12 June 2002 | Jeju World Cup Stadium, Seogwipo (N) | Slovenia | 3–1 | 2002 FIFA World Cup | Cuevas (2), Campos | 30,176 | |
| 513 | 15 June 2002 | Jeju World Cup Stadium, Seogwipo (N) | Germany | 0–1 | 2002 FIFA World Cup | | 25,176 | |
| 514 | 21 August 2002 | Castelão, Fortaleza (A) | Brazil | 1–0 | Friendly | Cuevas | 30,000 | |
| 515 | 19 September 2002 | Takhti Stadium, Tabriz (A) | Iran | 1–1 (3–4p) | 2002 LG Cup | Bareiro | 25,000 | |
| 516 | 16 October 2002 | Estadio Las Gaunas, Logroño (A) | Spain | 0–0 | Friendly | | 15,000 | |
| 517 | 26 March 2003 | San Diego Stadium, San Diego (N) | Mexico | 1–1 | Friendly | J. Cardozo | — | |
| 518 | 29 March 2003 | Estadio Alejandro Morera Soto, Alajuela (A) | Costa Rica | 1–2 | Friendly | J. Cáceres | — | |
| 519 | 2 April 2003 | National Stadium, Tegucigalpa (A) | Honduras | 1–1 | Friendly | Quintana | — | |
| 520 | 30 April 2003 | Estadio Monumental, Lima (A) | Peru | 1–0 | Friendly | Alvarenga | — | |
| 521 | 6 June 2003 | Estádio 1º de Maio, Braga (A) | Portugal | 0–0 | Friendly | | — | |
| 522 | 11 June 2003 | Saitama Stadium, Saitama (A) | Japan | 0–0 | 2003 Kirin Cup | | — | |
| 523 | 2 July 2003 | Candlestick Park, San Francisco (N) | El Salvador | 1–0 | Friendly | J. Samudio | — | |
| 524 | 6 July 2003 | Columbus Crew Stadium, Columbus (A) | United States | 0–2 | Friendly | | — | |
| 525 | 9 July 2003 | National Stadium, Kingston (A) | Jamaica | 0–2 | Friendly | | — | |
| 526 | 20 August 2003 | Rommel Fernández Stadium, Panama City (A) | Panama | 2–1 | Friendly | Campos, Gamarra | — | |
| 527 | 6 September 2003 | Estadio Nacional, Lima (A) | Peru | 1–4 | 2006 FIFA World Cup qualification | Gamarra | 42,557 | |
| 528 | 10 September 2003 | Estadio Defensores del Chaco, Asunción (H) | Uruguay | 4–1 | 2006 FIFA World Cup qualification | J. Cardozo (3), Parades | 15,000 | |
| 529 | 15 November 2003 | Estadio Defensores del Chaco, Asunción (H) | Ecuador | 2–1 | 2006 FIFA World Cup qualification | Santa Cruz, J. Cardozo | 20,000 | |
| 530 | 18 November 2003 | Estadio Nacional, Santiago (A) | Chile | 1–0 | 2006 FIFA World Cup qualification | Parades | 60,000 | |
| 531 | 31 March 2004 | Estadio Defensores del Chaco, Asunción (H) | Brazil | 0–0 | 2006 FIFA World Cup qualification | | 43,000 | |
| 532 | 28 April 2004 | Incheon Munhak Stadium, Incheon (A) | South Korea | 0–0 | Friendly | | 26,237 | |
| 533 | 1 June 2004 | Estadio Hernando Siles, La Paz (A) | Bolivia | 1–2 | 2006 FIFA World Cup qualification | J. Cardozo | 23,013 | |
| 534 | 6 June 2004 | Estadio Monumental, Buenos Aires (A) | Argentina | 0–0 | 2006 FIFA World Cup qualification | | 37,000 | |
| 535 | 8 July 2004 | Estadio Monumental, Arequipa (N) | Costa Rica | 1–0 | 2004 Copa América | Dos Santos | 30,000 | |
| 536 | 11 July 2004 | Estadio Monumental, Arequipa (N) | Chile | 1–1 | 2004 Copa América | Cristaldo | 15,000 | |
| 537 | 14 July 2004 | Estadio Monumental, Arequipa (N) | Brazil | 2–1 | 2004 Copa América | J. González, Bareiro | 8,000 | |
| 538 | 18 July 2004 | Estadio Jorge Basadre, Tacna (N) | Uruguay | 1–3 | 2004 Copa América | Gamarra | 20,000 | |
| 539 | 5 September 2004 | Estadio Defensores del Chaco, Asunción (H) | Venezuela | 1–0 | 2006 FIFA World Cup qualification | Gamarra | 30,000 | |
| 540 | 9 October 2004 | Estadio Metropolitano, Barranquilla (A) | Colombia | 1–1 | 2006 FIFA World Cup qualification | Gavilán | 25,000 | |
| 541 | 13 October 2004 | Estadio Defensores del Chaco, Asunción (H) | Peru | 1–1 | 2006 FIFA World Cup qualification | Parades | 30,000 | |
| 542 | 17 November 2004 | Estadio Centenario, Montevideo (A) | Uruguay | 0–1 | 2006 FIFA World Cup qualification | | 35,000 | |
| 543 | 19 January 2005 | Los Angeles Memorial Coliseum, Los Angeles (N) | South Korea | 1–1 | Friendly | J. Cardozo | 10,000 | |
| 544 | 23 January 2005 | Los Angeles Memorial Coliseum, Los Angeles (N) | Guatemala | 2–1 | Friendly | Cuevas, Dos Santos | — | |
| 545 | 27 March 2005 | Estadio Olímpico Atahualpa, Quito (A) | Ecuador | 2–5 | 2006 FIFA World Cup qualification | J. Cardozo, Cabañas | 32,449 | |
| 546 | 30 March 2005 | Estadio Defensores del Chaco, Asunción (H) | Chile | 2–1 | 2006 FIFA World Cup qualification | Morínigo, J. Cardozo | 10,000 | |
| 547 | 4 May 2005 | Giants Stadium, East Rutherford (N) | Ecuador | 0–1 | Friendly | | — | |
| 548 | 5 June 2005 | Estádio Beira-Rio, Porto Alegre (A) | Brazil | 1–4 | 2006 FIFA World Cup qualification | Santa Cruz | 45,000 | |
| 549 | 8 June 2005 | Estadio Defensores del Chaco, Asunción (H) | Bolivia | 4–1 | 2006 FIFA World Cup qualification | Gamarra, Santa Cruz, J. Cáceres, J. Núñez | 5,534 | |
| 550 | 17 August 2005 | Estadio Antonio Oddone Sarubbi, Ciudad del Este (H) | El Salvador | 3–0 | Friendly | Barreto, N. Valdez, Dos Santos | 12,000 | |
| 551 | 3 September 2005 | Estadio Defensores del Chaco, Asunción (H) | Argentina | 1–0 | 2006 FIFA World Cup qualification | Santa Cruz | 32,000 | |
| 552 | 8 October 2005 | Estadio José Pachencho Romero, Maracaibo (A) | Venezuela | 1–0 | 2006 FIFA World Cup qualification | N. Valdez | 13,272 | |
| 553 | 12 October 2005 | Estadio Defensores del Chaco, Asunción (H) | Colombia | 0–1 | 2006 FIFA World Cup qualification | | 12,374 | |
| 554 | 11 November 2005 | Azadi Stadium, Tehran (N) | Togo | 4–2 | Tehran International Tournament | López (2), Bonet, Dos Santos | — | |
| 555 | 1 March 2006 | Millennium Stadium, Cardiff (A) | Wales | 0–0 | Friendly | | 12,324 | |
| 556 | 29 March 2006 | Soldier Field, Chicago (N) | Mexico | 1–2 | Friendly | Cuevas | 46,510 | |
| 557 | 24 May 2006 | Ullevaal Stadion, Oslo (A) | Norway | 2–2 | Friendly | Gamarra, N. Valdez | 10,227 | |
| 558 | 27 May 2006 | Aarhus Stadium, Aarhus (A) | Denmark | 1–1 | Friendly | J. Cardozo | 20,047 | |
| 559 | 31 May 2006 | Stadion Birkenwiese, Dornbirn (N) | Georgia | 1–0 | Friendly | N. Valdez | 6,500 | |
| 560 | 10 June 2006 | Waldstadion, Frankfurt (N) | England | 0–1 | 2006 FIFA World Cup | | 48,000 | |
| 561 | 15 June 2006 | Olympiastadion, Berlin (N) | Sweden | 0–1 | 2006 FIFA World Cup | | 72,000 | |
| 562 | 20 June 2006 | Fritz-Walter-Stadion, Kaiserslautern (N) | Trinidad and Tobago | 2–0 | 2006 FIFA World Cup | Sancho (o.g.), Cuevas | 46,000 | |
| 563 | 7 October 2006 | Lang Park, Brisbane (A) | Australia | 1–1 | Friendly | Beauchamp (o.g.) | 47,609 | |
| 564 | 15 November 2006 | Estadio Sausalito, Viña del Mar (A) | Chile | 2–3 | Friendly | Giménez, C. Riveros | 9,000 | |
| 565 | 25 March 2007 | Estadio Universitario, San Nicolás de los Garza (A) | Mexico | 1–2 | Friendly | Santa Cruz | 38,000 | |
| 566 | 28 March 2007 | Estadio El Campín, Bogotá (A) | Colombia | 0–2 | Friendly | | 15,000 | |
| 567 | 2 June 2007 | Gerhard Hanappi Stadium, Vienna (A) | Austria | 0–0 | Friendly | | 12,700 | |
| 568 | 5 June 2007 | Estadio Azteca, Mexico City (A) | Mexico | 1–0 | Friendly | Ó. Cardozo | 60,000 | |
| 569 | 20 June 2007 | Estadio Ramón Tahuichi Aguilera, Santa Cruz de la Sierra (A) | Bolivia | 0–0 | Friendly | | — | |
| 570 | 28 June 2007 | Estadio José Pachencho Romero, Maracaibo (N) | Colombia | 5–0 | 2007 Copa América | Santa Cruz (3), Cabañas (2) | 30,000 | |
| 571 | 2 July 2007 | Estadio Agustín Tovar, Barinas (N) | United States | 3–1 | 2007 Copa América | Barreto, Ó. Cardozo, Cabañas | 23,000 | |
| 572 | 5 July 2007 | Estadio Metropolitano, Barquisimeto (N) | Argentina | 0–1 | 2007 Copa América | | 37,000 | |
| 573 | 8 July 2007 | Estadio Monumental, Maturín (N) | Mexico | 0–6 | 2007 Copa América | | 50,000 | |
| 574 | 22 August 2007 | Estadio Antonio Oddone Sarubbi, Ciudad del Este (H) | Venezuela | 1–1 | Friendly | A. da Silva | 35,000 | |
| 575 | 8 September 2007 | Estadio Polideportivo Cachamay, Ciudad Guayana (A) | Venezuela | 2–3 | Friendly | C. Riveros (2) | 35,000 | |
| 576 | 12 September 2007 | Estadio El Campín, Bogotá (A) | Colombia | 0–1 | Friendly | | 20,000 | |
| 577 | 13 October 2007 | Estadio Monumental, Lima (A) | Peru | 0–0 | 2010 FIFA World Cup qualification | | 50,000 | |
| 578 | 17 October 2007 | Estadio Defensores del Chaco, Asunción (H) | Uruguay | 1–0 | 2010 FIFA World Cup qualification | N. Valdez | 23,200 | |
| 579 | 17 November 2007 | Estadio Defensores del Chaco, Asunción (H) | Ecuador | 5–1 | 2010 FIFA World Cup qualification | N. Valdez, C. Riveros (2), Santa Cruz, N. Ayala | 25,433 | |
| 580 | 21 November 2007 | Estadio Nacional, Santiago (A) | Chile | 3–0 | 2010 FIFA World Cup qualification | Cabañas, P. da Silva (2) | 52,320 | |
| 581 | 6 February 2008 | Estadio Olímpico Metropolitano, San Pedro Sula (A) | Honduras | 0–2 | Friendly | | 5,000 | |
| 582 | 26 March 2008 | Super Stadium, Atteridgeville (A) | South Africa | 0–3 | Friendly | | 15,000 | |
| 583 | 22 May 2008 | Mitsuzawa Stadium, Yokohama (N) | Ivory Coast | 1–1 | 2008 Kirin Cup | Bogado | 5,197 | |
| 584 | 27 May 2008 | Saitama Stadium, Saitama (N) | Japan | 0–0 | 2008 Kirin Cup | | 27,998 | |
| 585 | 31 May 2008 | Stade de Toulouse, Toulouse (A) | France | 0–0 | Friendly | | 33,418 | |
| 586 | 15 June 2008 | Estadio Defensores del Chaco, Asunción (H) | Brazil | 2–0 | 2010 FIFA World Cup qualification | Santa Cruz, Cabañas | 3,800 | |
| 587 | 18 June 2008 | Estadio Hernando Siles, La Paz (A) | Bolivia | 2–4 | 2010 FIFA World Cup qualification | Santa Cruz, N. Valdez | 8,561 | |
| 588 | 20 August 2008 | Colovray Sports Centre, Nyon (N) | Saudi Arabia | 1–1 | Friendly | C. Riveros | — | |
| 589 | 6 September 2008 | Estadio Monumental, Buenos Aires (A) | Argentina | 1–1 | 2010 FIFA World Cup qualification | Heinze (o.g.) | 46,250 | |
| 590 | 9 September 2008 | Estadio Defensores del Chaco, Asunción (H) | Venezuela | 2–0 | 2010 FIFA World Cup qualification | C. Riveros, N. Valdez | 31,867 | |
| 591 | 11 October 2008 | Estadio El Campín, Bogotá (A) | Colombia | 1–0 | 2010 FIFA World Cup qualification | Cabañas | 26,000 | |
| 592 | 15 October 2008 | Estadio Defensores del Chaco, Asunción (H) | Peru | 1–0 | 2010 FIFA World Cup qualification | Ó. Cardozo | 31,545 | |
| 593 | 19 November 2008 | Sultan Qaboos Sports Complex, Muscat (A) | Oman | 1–0 | Friendly | Vera | — | |
| 594 | 11 February 2009 | Estadio Alejandro Villanueva, Lima (A) | Peru | 1–0 | Friendly | C. Riveros | — | |
| 595 | 28 March 2009 | Estadio Centenario, Montevideo (A) | Uruguay | 0–2 | 2010 FIFA World Cup qualification | | 45,000 | |
| 596 | 1 April 2009 | Estadio Olímpico Atahualpa, Quito (A) | Ecuador | 1–1 | 2010 FIFA World Cup qualification | É. Benítez | 36,853 | |
| 597 | 6 June 2009 | Estadio Defensores del Chaco, Asunción (H) | Chile | 0–2 | 2010 FIFA World Cup qualification | | 34,000 | |
| 598 | 10 June 2009 | Estádio do Arruda, Recife (A) | Brazil | 1–2 | 2010 FIFA World Cup qualification | Cabañas | 56,682 | |
| 599 | 12 August 2009 | Seoul World Cup Stadium, Seoul (A) | South Korea | 0–1 | Friendly | | — | |
| 600 | 5 September 2009 | Estadio Defensores del Chaco, Asunción (H) | Bolivia | 1–0 | 2010 FIFA World Cup qualification | Cabañas | 25,094 | |
| 601 | 9 September 2009 | Estadio Defensores del Chaco, Asunción (H) | Argentina | 1–0 | 2010 FIFA World Cup qualification | N. Valdez | 38,000 | |
| 602 | 10 October 2009 | Estadio Polideportivo Cachamay, Ciudad Guayana (A) | Venezuela | 2–1 | 2010 FIFA World Cup qualification | Cabañas, Ó. Cardozo | 41,680 | |
| 603 | 14 October 2009 | Estadio Defensores del Chaco, Asunción (H) | Colombia | 0–2 | 2010 FIFA World Cup qualification | | 17,503 | |
| 604 | 4 November 2009 | Estadio CAP, Talcahuano (A) | Chile | 1–2 | Friendly | Cabral | — | |
| 605 | 13 November 2009 | Stade Robert Diochon, Le Petit-Quevilly (N) | Qatar | 0–2 | Friendly | | — | |
| 606 | 18 November 2009 | Abe Lenstra Stadion, Heerenveen (A) | Netherlands | 0–0 | Friendly | | — | |
| 607 | 31 March 2010 | Estadio Defensores del Chaco, Asunción (H) | South Africa | 1–1 | Friendly | Estigarribia | — | |
| 608 | 15 May 2010 | Colovray Sports Centre, Nyon (N) | North Korea | 1–0 | Friendly | Santa Cruz | — | |
| 609 | 25 May 2010 | RDS Arena, Dublin (A) | Republic of Ireland | 1–2 | Friendly | Barrios | — | |
| 610 | 30 May 2010 | Stade Joseph-Moynat, Thonon-les-Bains (N) | Ivory Coast | 2–2 | Friendly | Barrios, Torres | — | |
| 611 | 2 June 2010 | Kybunpark, Sankt Gallen (N) | Greece | 2–0 | Friendly | Vera, Barrios | — | |
| 612 | 14 June 2010 | Cape Town Stadium, Cape Town (N) | Italy | 1–1 | 2010 FIFA World Cup | Alcaraz | 62,829 | |
| 613 | 20 June 2010 | Free State Stadium, Bloemfontein (N) | Slovakia | 2–0 | 2010 FIFA World Cup | Vera, C. Riveros | 26,643 | |
| 614 | 24 June 2010 | Peter Mokaba Stadium, Polokwane (N) | New Zealand | 0–0 | 2010 FIFA World Cup | | 34,850 | |
| 615 | 29 June 2010 | Loftus Versfeld Stadium, Pretoria (N) | Japan | 0–0 (a.e.t.) (5–3p) | 2010 FIFA World Cup | | 36,742 | |
| 616 | 3 July 2010 | Ellis Park Stadium, Johannesburg (N) | Spain | 0–1 | 2010 FIFA World Cup | | 55,359 | |
| 617 | 11 August 2010 | Estadio Defensores del Chaco, Asunción (H) | Costa Rica | 2–0 | Friendly | Vera, C. Riveros | — | |
| 618 | 4 September 2010 | International Stadium, Yokohama (A) | Japan | 0–1 | Friendly | | — | |
| 619 | 7 September 2010 | Nanjing Olympic Sports Centre, Nanjing (A) | China | 1–1 | Friendly | Barrios | — | |
| 620 | 9 October 2010 | Sydney Football Stadium, Sydney (A) | Australia | 0–1 | Friendly | | — | |
| 621 | 12 October 2010 | Wellington Regional Stadium, Wellington (A) | New Zealand | 2–0 | Friendly | N. Valdez, Martínez | — | |
| 622 | 17 November 2010 | Hong Kong Stadium, Hong Kong (A) | Hong Kong | 7–0 | Friendly | Santa Cruz (2), Barreto, Ortigoza (2), M. Riveros, C. Riveros | — | |
| 623 | 26 March 2011 | Oakland Coliseum, Oakland (N) | Mexico | 1–3 | Friendly | C. Riveros | — | |
| 624 | 29 March 2011 | Nissan Stadium, Nashville (A) | United States | 1–0 | Friendly | Ó. Cardozo | — | |
| 625 | 25 May 2011 | Estadio Centenario, Resistencia (A) | Argentina | 2–4 | Friendly | Zeballos, Marecos | — | |
| 626 | 4 June 2011 | Estadio Ramón Tahuichi Aguilera, Santa Cruz de la Sierra (A) | Bolivia | 2–0 | Friendly | Barrios, Santander | — | |
| 627 | 7 June 2011 | Estadio Feliciano Cáceres, Luque (H) | Bolivia | 0–0 | Friendly | | — | |
| 628 | 11 June 2011 | Estadio Defensores del Chaco, Asunción (H) | Romania | 2–0 | Friendly | N. Valdez, Santa Cruz | — | |
| 629 | 23 June 2011 | Estadio Defensores del Chaco, Asunción (H) | Chile | 0–0 | Friendly | | — | |
| 630 | 3 July 2011 | Estadio Brigadier General Estanislao López, Santa Fe (N) | Ecuador | 0–0 | 2011 Copa América | | 20,000 | |
| 631 | 9 July 2011 | Estadio Mario Alberto Kempes, Córdoba (N) | Brazil | 2–2 | 2011 Copa América | Santa Cruz, N. Valdez | 57,000 | |
| 632 | 13 July 2011 | Estadio Padre Ernesto Martearena, Salta (N) | Venezuela | 3–3 | 2011 Copa América | Alcaraz, Barrios, C. Riveros | 18,000 | |
| 633 | 17 July 2011 | Estadio Ciudad de La Plata, La Plata (N) | Brazil | 0–0 (a.e.t.) (2–0p) | 2011 Copa América | | 36,000 | |
| 634 | 20 July 2011 | Estadio Malvinas Argentinas, Mendoza (N) | Venezuela | 0–0 (a.e.t.) (5–3p) | 2011 Copa América | | 8,000 | |
| 635 | 24 July 2011 | Estadio Monumental, Buenos Aires (N) | Uruguay | 0–3 | 2011 Copa América | | 57,921 | |
| 636 | 2 September 2011 | Rommel Fernández Stadium, Panama City (A) | Panama | 2–0 | Friendly | Ó. Cardozo, Ramírez | — | |
| 637 | 6 September 2011 | Estadio General Francisco Morazán, San Pedro Sula (A) | Honduras | 3–0 | Friendly | Camacho, L. Cardozo (2) | — | |
| 638 | 7 October 2011 | Estadio Nacional, Lima (A) | Peru | 0–2 | 2014 FIFA World Cup qualification | | 40,000 | |
| 639 | 11 October 2011 | Estadio Defensores del Chaco, Asunción (H) | Uruguay | 1–1 | 2014 FIFA World Cup qualification | Ortiz | 12,922 | |
| 640 | 11 November 2011 | Estadio Defensores del Chaco, Asunción (H) | Ecuador | 2–1 | 2014 FIFA World Cup qualification | C. Riveros, Verón | 11,173 | |
| 641 | 15 November 2011 | Estadio Nacional, Santiago (A) | Chile | 0–2 | 2014 FIFA World Cup qualification | | 44,726 | |
| 642 | 21 December 2011 | Estadio La Portada, La Serena (A) | Chile | 2–3 | Friendly | É. Benítez, Manzur | — | |
| 643 | 15 February 2012 | Estadio Feliciano Cáceres, Luque (H) | Chile | 2–0 | Friendly | É. Benítez, Orgitoza | — | |
| 644 | 22 February 2012 | Estadio Feliciano Cáceres, Luque (H) | Guatemala | 2–1 | Friendly | É. Benítez, Bogado | — | |
| 645 | 29 February 2012 | Estadio General Pablo Rojas, Asunción (H) | Panama | 1–0 | Friendly | Santana | — | |
| 646 | 25 April 2012 | Estadio Doroteo Guamuch Flores, Guatemala City (A) | Guatemala | 1–0 | Friendly | Mazacotte | — | |
| 647 | 9 June 2012 | Estadio Hernando Siles, La Paz (A) | Bolivia | 1–3 | 2014 FIFA World Cup qualification | C. Riveros | 17,320 | |
| 648 | 15 August 2012 | Robert F. Kennedy Memorial Stadium, Washington, D.C. (N) | Guatemala | 3–3 | Friendly | Ó. Cardozo, Fabbro, Pérez | — | |
| 649 | 7 September 2012 | Estadio Mario Alberto Kempes, Córdoba (A) | Argentina | 1–3 | 2014 FIFA World Cup qualification | Fabbro | 51,000 | |
| 650 | 11 September 2012 | Estadio Defensores del Chaco, Asunción (H) | Venezuela | 0–2 | 2014 FIFA World Cup qualification | | 13,680 | |
| 651 | 12 October 2012 | Estadio Metropolitano, Barranquilla (A) | Colombia | 0–2 | 2014 FIFA World Cup qualification | | 45,000 | |
| 652 | 16 October 2012 | Estadio Defensores del Chaco, Asunción (H) | Peru | 1–0 | 2014 FIFA World Cup qualification | Aguilar | 40,114 | |
| 653 | 14 November 2012 | Estadio Feliciano Cáceres, Luque (H) | Guatemala | 3–1 | Friendly | Caballero, Aguilar (2) | — | |
| 654 | 6 February 2013 | Estadio Dr. Nicolás Léoz, Asunción (H) | El Salvador | 3–0 | Friendly | Aguilar, Ortiz (2) | — | |
| 655 | 22 March 2013 | Estadio Centenario, Montevideo (A) | Uruguay | 1–1 | 2014 FIFA World Cup qualification | É. Benítez | 32,000 | |
| 656 | 26 March 2013 | Estadio Olímpico Atahualpa, Quito (A) | Ecuador | 1–4 | 2014 FIFA World Cup qualification | Caballero | 33,048 | |
| 657 | 7 June 2013 | Estadio Defensores del Chaco, Asunción (H) | Chile | 1–2 | 2014 FIFA World Cup qualification | Santa Cruz | 30,000 | |
| 658 | 14 August 2013 | Fritz-Walter-Stadion, Kaiserslautern (A) | Germany | 3–3 | Friendly | J. A. Núñez, Pittoni, M. Samudio | — | |
| 659 | 6 September 2013 | Estadio Defensores del Chaco, Asunción (H) | Bolivia | 4–0 | 2014 FIFA World Cup qualification | Fabbro, Santa Cruz, Ortiz, Gómez | 20,000 | |
| 660 | 10 September 2013 | Estadio Defensores del Chaco, Asunción (H) | Argentina | 2–5 | 2014 FIFA World Cup qualification | J. A. Núñez, Santa Cruz | 27,000 | |
| 661 | 11 October 2013 | Estadio Polideportivo de Pueblo Nuevo, San Cristóbal (A) | Venezuela | 1–1 | 2014 FIFA World Cup qualification | É. Benítez | 27,277 | |
| 662 | 15 October 2013 | Estadio Defensores del Chaco, Asunción (H) | Colombia | 1–2 | 2014 FIFA World Cup qualification | J. Rojas | 7,142 | |
| 663 | 5 March 2014 | Estadio Nacional de Costa Rica, San José (A) | Costa Rica | 1–2 | Friendly | Gómez | — | |
| 664 | 29 May 2014 | Kufstein Arena, Kufstein (N) | Cameroon | 2–1 | Friendly | Ó. Romero, Santa Cruz | — | |
| 665 | 1 June 2014 | Allianz Riviera, Nice (A) | France | 1–1 | Friendly | V. Cáceres | — | |
| 666 | 7 September 2014 | Stadion Villach Lind, Villach (N) | United Arab Emirates | 0–0 | Friendly | | — | |
| 667 | 10 October 2014 | Cheonan Stadium, Cheonan (A) | South Korea | 0–2 | Friendly | | — | |
| 668 | 14 October 2014 | Helong Sports Center Stadium, Changsha (A) | China | 1–2 | Friendly | Ortigoza | — | |
| 669 | 14 November 2014 | Estadio Feliciano Cáceres, Luque (H) | Peru | 2–1 | Friendly | Á. Romero, D. González | — | |
| 670 | 18 November 2014 | Estadio Nacional, Lima (A) | Peru | 1–2 | Friendly | Santa Cruz | — | |
| 671 | 26 March 2015 | Estadio Nacional de Costa Rica, San José (A) | Costa Rica | 0–0 | Friendly | | — | |
| 672 | 31 March 2015 | Arrowhead Stadium, Kansas City (N) | Mexico | 0–1 | Friendly | | — | |
| 673 | 6 June 2015 | Estadio Defensores del Chaco, Asunción (H) | Honduras | 2–2 | Friendly | Santa Cruz (2) | — | |
| 674 | 13 June 2015 | Estadio La Portada, La Serena (N) | Argentina | 2–2 | 2015 Copa América | N. Valdez, Barrios | 16,281 | |
| 675 | 16 June 2015 | Estadio Regional de Antofagasta, Antofagasta (N) | Jamaica | 1–0 | 2015 Copa América | É. Benítez | 6,099 | |
| 676 | 20 June 2015 | Estadio La Portada, La Serena (N) | Uruguay | 1–1 | 2015 Copa América | Barrios | 16,021 | |
| 677 | 27 June 2015 | Estadio Municipal, Concepción (N) | Brazil | 1–1 | 2015 Copa América | D. González | 29,276 | |
| 678 | 30 June 2015 | Estadio Municipal, Concepción (N) | Argentina | 1–6 | 2015 Copa América | Barrios | 29,205 | |
| 679 | 3 July 2015 | Estadio Municipal, Concepción (N) | Peru | 0–2 | 2015 Copa América | | 29,143 | |
| 680 | 5 September 2015 | Estadio Nacional, Santiago (A) | Chile | 2–3 | Friendly | Fabbro, J. Benítez | — | |
| 681 | 8 October 2015 | Estadio Polideportivo Cachamay, Ciudad Guayana (A) | Venezuela | 1–0 | 2018 FIFA World Cup qualification | D. González | 38,618 | |
| 682 | 13 October 2015 | Estadio Defensores del Chaco, Asunción (H) | Argentina | 0–0 | 2018 FIFA World Cup qualification | | 28,889 | |
| 683 | 13 November 2015 | Estadio Nacional, Lima (A) | Peru | 0–1 | 2018 FIFA World Cup qualification | | 26,000 | |
| 684 | 17 November 2015 | Estadio Defensores del Chaco, Asunción (H) | Bolivia | 2–1 | 2018 FIFA World Cup qualification | Lezcano, Barrios | 35,850 | |
| 685 | 24 March 2016 | Estadio Olímpico Atahualpa, Quito (A) | Ecuador | 2–2 | 2018 FIFA World Cup qualification | Lezcano (2) | 34,817 | |
| 686 | 29 March 2016 | Estadio Defensores del Chaco, Asunción (H) | Brazil | 2–2 | 2018 FIFA World Cup qualification | Lezcano, É. Benítez | 34,457 | |
| 687 | 28 May 2016 | Georgia Dome, Atlanta (N) | Mexico | 0–1 | Friendly | | 63,049 | |
| 688 | 4 June 2016 | Camping World Stadium, Orlando (N) | Costa Rica | 0–0 | Copa América Centenario | | 14,334 | |
| 689 | 7 June 2016 | Rose Bowl, Pasadena (N) | Colombia | 1–2 | Copa América Centenario | V. Ayala | 42,766 | |
| 690 | 11 June 2016 | Lincoln Financial Field, Philadelphia (N) | United States | 0–1 | Copa América Centenario | | 51,041 | |
| 691 | 1 September 2016 | Estadio Defensores del Chaco, Asunción (H) | Chile | 2–1 | 2018 FIFA World Cup qualification | Ó. Romero, P. da Silva | 25,000 | |
| 692 | 6 September 2016 | Estadio Centenario, Montevideo (A) | Uruguay | 0–4 | 2018 FIFA World Cup qualification | | 39,400 | |
| 693 | 6 October 2016 | Estadio Defensores del Chaco, Asunción (H) | Colombia | 0–1 | 2018 FIFA World Cup qualification | | 33,000 | |
| 694 | 11 October 2016 | Estadio Mario Alberto Kempes, Córdoba (A) | Argentina | 1–0 | 2018 FIFA World Cup qualification | D. González | 51,200 | |
| 695 | 10 November 2016 | Estadio Defensores del Chaco, Asunción (H) | Peru | 1–4 | 2018 FIFA World Cup qualification | C. Riveros | 36,000 | |
| 696 | 15 November 2016 | Estadio Hernando Siles, La Paz (A) | Bolivia | 0–1 | 2018 FIFA World Cup qualification | | 13,285 | |
| 697 | 23 March 2017 | Estadio Defensores del Chaco, Asunción (H) | Ecuador | 2–1 | 2018 FIFA World Cup qualification | B. Valdez, Alonso | 16,287 | |
| 698 | 28 March 2017 | Arena Corinthians, São Paulo (A) | Brazil | 0–3 | 2018 FIFA World Cup qualification | | 45,000 | |
| 699 | 2 June 2017 | Roazhon Park, Rennes (A) | France | 0–5 | Friendly | | — | |
| 700 | 8 June 2017 | Estadio Mansiche, Trujillo (A) | Peru | 0–1 | Friendly | | — | |
| 701 | 1 July 2017 | Lumen Field, Seattle (N) | Mexico | 1–2 | Friendly | Bareiro | — | |
| 702 | 31 August 2017 | Estadio Monumental, Santiago (A) | Chile | 3–0 | 2018 FIFA World Cup qualification | Vidal (o.g.), V. Cáceres, Ortiz | 43,000 | |
| 703 | 5 September 2017 | Estadio Defensores del Chaco, Asunción (H) | Uruguay | 1–2 | 2018 FIFA World Cup qualification | Á. Romero | 35,000 | |
| 704 | 5 October 2017 | Estadio Metropolitano, Barranquilla (A) | Colombia | 2–1 | 2018 FIFA World Cup qualification | Ó. Cardozo, Sanabria | 47,000 | |
| 705 | 10 October 2017 | Estadio Defensores del Chaco, Asunción (H) | Venezuela | 0–1 | 2018 FIFA World Cup qualification | | 38,786 | |
| 706 | 27 March 2018 | WakeMed Soccer Park, Cary (A) | United States | 0–1 | Friendly | | 9,895 | |
| 707 | 12 June 2018 | Tivoli Stadion Tirol, Innsbruck (N) | Japan | 2–4 | Friendly | Ó. Romero, Ortiz | 1,200 | |
| 708 | 20 November 2018 | Moses Mabhida Stadium, Durban (A) | South Africa | 1–1 | Friendly | Santander | — | |
| 709 | 22 March 2019 | Red Bull Arena, Harrison (N) | Peru | 0–1 | Friendly | | — | |
| 710 | 26 March 2019 | Levi's Stadium, Santa Clara (N) | Mexico | 2–4 | Friendly | Pérez, D. González | 50,317 | |
| 711 | 5 June 2019 | Estadio Antonio Aranda, Ciudad del Este (H) | Honduras | 1–1 | Friendly | Ó. Cardozo | 20,000 | |
| 712 | 9 June 2019 | Estadio Defensores del Chaco, Asunción (H) | Guatemala | 2–0 | Friendly | Gómez, D. González | 12,000 | |
| 713 | 16 June 2019 | Maracanã Stadium, Rio de Janeiro (N) | Qatar | 2–2 | 2019 Copa América | Ó. Cardozo, D. González | 19,196 | |
| 714 | 19 June 2019 | Mineirão, Belo Horizonte (N) | Argentina | 1–1 | 2019 Copa América | Sánchez | 35,265 | |
| 715 | 23 June 2019 | Arena Fonte Nova, Salvador (N) | Colombia | 0–1 | 2019 Copa América | | 13,903 | |
| 716 | 27 June 2019 | Arena do Grêmio, Porto Alegre (N) | Brazil | 0–0 (3–4p) | 2019 Copa América | | 44,902 | |
| 717 | 5 September 2019 | Kashima Soccer Stadium, Kashima (A) | Japan | 0–2 | Friendly | | — | |
| 718 | 10 September 2019 | Amman International Stadium, Amman (A) | Jordan | 4–2 | Friendly | Ó. Romero, Almirón, R. Rojas, Kaku | 4,000 | |
| 719 | 10 October 2019 | Stadion Mladost, Kruševac (A) | Serbia | 0–1 | Friendly | | 5,000 | |
| 720 | 13 October 2019 | Tehelné pole, Bratislava (A) | Slovakia | 1–1 | Friendly | Kaku | 6,669 | |
| 721 | 14 November 2019 | Vasil Levski National Stadium, Sofia (A) | Bulgaria | 1–0 | Friendly | Almirón | 500 | |
| 722 | 19 November 2019 | Prince Faisal bin Fahd Sports City Stadium, Riyadh (A) | Saudi Arabia | 0–0 | Friendly | | 5,175 | |

== Record by opponent ==
| Team | Pld | W | D | L | GF | GA | GD | WPCT |
|---|---|---|---|---|---|---|---|---|
| Argentina | 15 | 3 | 7 | 5 | 16 | 26 | −10 | 20.00 |
| Australia | 5 | 0 | 3 | 2 | 2 | 4 | −2 | 0.00 |
| Austria | 1 | 0 | 1 | 0 | 0 | 0 | 0 | 0.00 |
| Bolivia | 14 | 6 | 4 | 4 | 24 | 15 | +9 | 42.86 |
| Brazil | 15 | 4 | 6 | 5 | 15 | 21 | −6 | 26.67 |
| Bulgaria | 1 | 1 | 0 | 0 | 1 | 0 | +1 | 100.00 |
| Cameroon | 1 | 1 | 0 | 0 | 2 | 1 | +1 | 100.00 |
| Chile | 17 | 7 | 2 | 8 | 24 | 23 | +1 | 41.18 |
| China | 2 | 0 | 1 | 1 | 2 | 3 | −1 | 0.00 |
| Colombia | 15 | 4 | 1 | 10 | 13 | 20 | −7 | 26.67 |
| Costa Rica | 7 | 3 | 2 | 2 | 6 | 4 | +2 | 42.86 |
| Denmark | 1 | 0 | 1 | 0 | 1 | 1 | 0 | 0.00 |
| Ecuador | 12 | 5 | 3 | 4 | 21 | 20 | +1 | 41.67 |
| El Salvador | 3 | 3 | 0 | 0 | 7 | 0 | +7 | 100.00 |
| England | 2 | 0 | 0 | 2 | 0 | 5 | −5 | 0.00 |
| FR Yugoslavia | 1 | 1 | 0 | 0 | 2 | 0 | +2 | 100.00 |
| France | 3 | 0 | 2 | 1 | 1 | 6 | −5 | 0.00 |
| Georgia | 1 | 1 | 0 | 0 | 1 | 0 | +1 | 100.00 |
| Germany | 2 | 0 | 1 | 1 | 3 | 4 | −1 | 0.00 |
| Greece | 1 | 1 | 0 | 0 | 2 | 0 | +2 | 100.00 |
| Guatemala | 6 | 5 | 1 | 0 | 13 | 6 | +7 | 83.33 |
| Honduras | 5 | 1 | 3 | 1 | 7 | 6 | +1 | 20.00 |
| Hong Kong | 1 | 1 | 0 | 0 | 7 | 0 | +7 | 100.00 |
| Iran | 1 | 0 | 1 | 0 | 1 | 1 | 0 | 0.00 |
| Italy | 1 | 0 | 1 | 0 | 1 | 1 | 0 | 0.00 |
| Ivory Coast | 2 | 0 | 2 | 0 | 3 | 3 | 0 | 0.00 |
| Jamaica | 2 | 1 | 0 | 1 | 1 | 2 | −1 | 50.00 |
| Japan | 7 | 0 | 3 | 4 | 2 | 9 | −7 | 0.00 |
| Jordan | 1 | 1 | 0 | 0 | 4 | 2 | +2 | 100.00 |
| Mexico | 11 | 1 | 2 | 8 | 8 | 22 | −14 | 9.09 |
| Netherlands | 1 | 0 | 1 | 0 | 0 | 0 | 0 | 0.00 |
| New Zealand | 2 | 1 | 1 | 0 | 2 | 0 | +2 | 50.00 |
| Nigeria | 1 | 0 | 1 | 0 | 1 | 1 | 0 | 0.00 |
| North Korea | 1 | 1 | 0 | 0 | 1 | 0 | +1 | 100.00 |
| Norway | 1 | 0 | 1 | 0 | 2 | 2 | 0 | 0.00 |
| Oman | 1 | 1 | 0 | 0 | 1 | 0 | +1 | 100.00 |
| Panama | 3 | 3 | 0 | 0 | 5 | 1 | +4 | 100.00 |
| Peru | 18 | 6 | 3 | 9 | 18 | 25 | −7 | 33.33 |
| Portugal | 1 | 0 | 1 | 0 | 0 | 0 | 0 | 0.00 |
| Qatar | 2 | 0 | 1 | 1 | 2 | 4 | −2 | 0.00 |
| Republic of Ireland | 1 | 0 | 0 | 1 | 1 | 2 | −1 | 0.00 |
| Romania | 1 | 1 | 0 | 0 | 2 | 0 | +2 | 100.00 |
| Saudi Arabia | 2 | 0 | 2 | 0 | 1 | 1 | 0 | 0.00 |
| Serbia | 1 | 0 | 0 | 1 | 0 | 1 | −1 | 0.00 |
| Slovakia | 2 | 1 | 1 | 0 | 3 | 1 | +2 | 50.00 |
| Slovenia | 1 | 1 | 0 | 0 | 3 | 1 | +2 | 100.00 |
| South Africa | 4 | 0 | 3 | 1 | 4 | 7 | −3 | 0.00 |
| South Korea | 5 | 0 | 3 | 2 | 2 | 5 | −3 | 0.00 |
| Spain | 3 | 0 | 1 | 2 | 1 | 4 | −3 | 0.00 |
| Sweden | 2 | 1 | 0 | 1 | 2 | 2 | 0 | 50.00 |
| Togo | 1 | 1 | 0 | 0 | 4 | 2 | +2 | 100.00 |
| Trinidad and Tobago | 1 | 1 | 0 | 0 | 2 | 0 | +2 | 100.00 |
| United Arab Emirates | 1 | 0 | 1 | 0 | 0 | 0 | 0 | 0.00 |
| United States | 5 | 2 | 0 | 3 | 4 | 5 | −1 | 40.00 |
| Uruguay | 13 | 4 | 3 | 6 | 12 | 19 | −7 | 30.77 |
| Venezuela | 14 | 6 | 4 | 4 | 18 | 15 | +3 | 42.86 |
| Wales | 1 | 0 | 1 | 0 | 0 | 0 | 0 | 0.00 |
| Total | 245 | 80 | 75 | 90 | 281 | 303 | −22 | 32.65 |

Source: Results
