= 2001 Lunar New Year Cup =

Tournament details
- Host country: Hong Kong
- Dates: 8–11 February
- Teams: 4
- Venue: 1 (in 1 host city)

Final positions
- Champions: Norway (1st title)

Tournament statistics
- Matches played: 4
- Goals scored: 10 (2.5 per match)
- Top scorer: (Norway) Frode Johnsen (3 goals)

The 2001 Lunar New Year Cup (aka Carlsberg Cup) was a football tournament held in Hong Kong over the first and fourth day of the Chinese New Year holiday.

== Participating teams ==
- Hong Kong League XI (host)
- South Korea
- Norway
- Paraguay

== Squads ==
=== Hong Kong League XI ===
Some of the players include:

- (Russia) Viktor Derbunov
- (Brazil) Cristiano Cordeiro
- (Federal Republic of Yugoslavia) Dejan Antonić
- (Brazil) Ailton de Araujo
- Andrew Roddie
- (Scotland) Paul Ritchie
- (England) John Moore
- (United States) Gerardo Laterza
- (Scotland) Gary McKeown
- (Bulgaria) Dimitre Kalkanov
- (Nigeria) Gerard Guy Ambassa
- (Hong Kong) Luk Koon Pong
- (Brazil) Aderbal Filho
- (Nigeria) Cornelius Udebuluzor

=== Korea Republic ===
Coach: (Netherlands) Guus Hiddink

No.	Pos.	Player	Date of birth (age)	Caps	Club
1	GK	Lee Woon-jae	26 April 1973 (aged 27)		(South Korea) Sangju Sangmu
2	DF	Lee Lim-saeng	18 November 1971 (aged 29)		(South Korea) Bucheon SK
4	MF	Seo Dong-won	14 August 1975 (aged 25)		(South Korea) Jeonbuk Hyundai Motors
6	MF	Yoo Sang-chul	18 October 1971 (aged 29)		(Japan) Kashiwa Reysol
7	DF	Kim Tae-young	8 November 1970 (aged 30)		(South Korea) Chunnam Dragons
9	FW	Kim Do-hoon	21 July 1970 (aged 30)		(South Korea) Jeonbuk Hyundai Motors
10	FW	Choi Yong-soo	10 September 1973 (aged 27)		(Japan) JEF United Ichihara
11	MF	Seo Jung-won	17 December 1970 (aged 30)		(South Korea) Suwon Samsung Bluewings
12	DF	Lee Young-pyo	23 April 1977 (aged 23)		(South Korea) Anyang LG Cheetahs
13	DF	Sim Jae-won	11 March 1977 (aged 23)		(South Korea) Pusan I'Cons
14	DF	Kim Sang-sik	17 December 1976 (aged 24)		(South Korea) Seongnam Ilhwa Chunma
15	DF	Lee Min-sung	23 June 1973 (aged 27)		(South Korea) Pusan I'Cons
17	FW	Park Sung-bae	28 November 1975 (aged 25)		(South Korea) Jeonbuk Hyundai Motors
18	GK	Kim Byung-ji	8 April 1970 (aged 30)		(South Korea) Pohang Steelers
20	DF	Hong Myung-bo	12 February 1969 (aged 31)		(Japan) Kashiwa Reysol
21	MF	Park Ji-sung	25 February 1981 (aged 19)		(Japan) Kyoto Purple Sanga
22	MF	Ko Jong-soo	30 October 1978 (aged 22)		(South Korea) Suwon Samsung Bluewings
25	GK	Kim Yong-dae	11 October 1979 (aged 21)		(South Korea) Yonsei University

=== Norway ===
Coach: Nils Johan Semb

No.	Pos.	Player	Date of birth (age)	Caps	Club
1	GK	Morten Bakke	16 December 1968 (aged 32)		(Norway) Molde
3	DF	Pa Modou Kah	30 July 1980 (aged 20)		(Norway) Vålerenga Fotball
5	DF	Ståle Stensaas	7 July 1971 (aged 29)		(Norway) Rosenborg
6	MF	Morten Fevang	6 March 1975 (aged 25)		(Norway) Odd
7	MF	Tommy Svindal Larsen	11 August 1973 (aged 27)		(Norway) Stabæk
8	MF	Dagfinn Enerly	9 December 1972 (aged 28)		(Norway) Rosenborg
9	FW	Frode Johnsen	17 March 1974 (aged 26)		(Norway) Rosenborg
10	FW	Thorstein Helstad	28 April 1977 (aged 23)		(Norway) Brann
11	MF	Bjarte Lunde Aarsheim	14 January 1975 (aged 26)		(Norway) Viking
13	DF	Alexander Aas	14 September 1978 (aged 22)		(Norway) Odd
14	MF	Fredrik Winsnes	28 December 1975 (aged 25)		(Norway) Rosenborg
15	MF	Jonny Hanssen	13 December 1972 (aged 28)		(Norway) Tromsø
16	FW	Azar Karadas	9 August 1981 (aged 19)		(Norway) Brann
17	FW	Bengt Sæternes	1 January 1975 (aged 26)		(Norway) Bodø/Glimt
18	FW	Tommy Øren	10 May 1980 (aged 20)		(Norway) Sogndal
19	DF	Torjus Hansén	29 October 1973 (aged 27)		(Norway) Lillestrøm

=== Paraguay ===
Coach: Víctor Genés

No.	Pos.	Player	Date of birth (age)	Caps	Club
1	GK	Ricardo Tavarelli	2 August 1970 (aged 30)		(Paraguay) Olimpia
2		Jacinto Zorrilla			
3	DF	Rubén Maldonado	29 April 1979 (aged 21)		(Italy) Cosenza
4	DF	Paulo da Silva	1 February 1980 (aged 20)		(Italy) Venezia
5	DF	Juan Daniel Cáceres	6 October 1973 (aged 27)		(Paraguay) Cerro Porteño
6	MF	Estanislao Struway	25 June 1968 (aged 32)		(Paraguay) Cerro Porteño
7		Nery Ortiz			
8	MF	Diego Gavilán	1 March 1980 (aged 20)		(England) Newcastle United
9	FW	Carlos Torres	10 March 1968 (aged 32)		(Spain) Real Jaén
10	FW	Salvador Cabañas	5 August 1980 (aged 20)		(Paraguay) 12 de Octubre
11	MF	Gustavo Morínigo	23 January 1977 (aged 24)		(Paraguay) Libertad
14		Christian Esquivel			
15		Hugo Ortiz			
18	FW	Javier González	24 September 1979 (aged 21)		(Paraguay) Cerro Corá
19		Aristides Masi	14 January 1977 (aged 24)		(Paraguay) Sportivo Luqueño
21	DF	Darío Verón	26 July 1979 (aged 21)		(Paraguay) Guaraní
22	GK	Justo Villar	30 June 1977 (aged 23)		(Paraguay) Libertad

== Results ==
=== Semifinals ===
8 February 2001

Norway	3–2	South Korea
Johnsen 35', 68'; Helstad 42'		Ko Jong-soo 23' (pen.); Kim Do-hoon 67'

Hong Kong Stadium, Hong Kong
Attendance: 22,936
Referee: Anders Frisk (Sweden)
8 February 2001

Hong Kong League XI	0–0	Paraguay
Penalties
	9–8

Hong Kong Stadium, Hong Kong
Attendance: 22,936
Referee: Masayoshi Okada (Japan)

=== Third place match ===
11 February 2001

Paraguay	1–1	South Korea
Morínigo 69'		Ko Jong-soo 56'
Penalties
	5–6

Hong Kong Stadium, Hong Kong
Attendance: 30,000
Referee: Masayoshi Okada (Japan)

=== Final ===
11 February 2001

Hong Kong League XI	1–2	Norway
Moore 90'		Johnsen 32'; Helstad 85'

Hong Kong Stadium, Hong Kong
Attendance: 30,000
Referee: Anders Frisk (Sweden)

== Bracket ==
Semi-finals
2001 – Hong Kong
Norway	3
South Korea	2
2001 – Hong Kong
Hong Kong League XI (pen.)	0 (9)
Paraguay	0 (8)

Final
2001 – Hong Kong
Hong Kong League XI	1
Norway	2
Third place
2001 – Hong Kong
Paraguay	1 (5)
South Korea (pen.)	1 (6)

2001 Carlsberg Cup champions

Norway
First title

== Scorers ==
3 goals

- (Norway) Frode Johnsen

2 goals

- (Norway) Thorstein Helstad
- (South Korea) Ko Jong-soo

1 goal

- (South Korea) Kim Do-hoon
- (Paraguay) Gustavo Morinigo
- (Hong Kong) John Moore

== See also ==
- Hong Kong Football Association
- Hong Kong First Division League
