= Víctor Genes =

Paraguayan footballer and manager (1961–2019)

Personal information
- Date of birth: 29 June 1961
- Place of birth: Asunción, Paraguay
- Date of death: 17 March 2019 (aged 57)
- Place of death: Asunción, Paraguay
- Position: Attacking midfielder

International career
Years	Team	Apps	(Gls)
1991	Paraguay	3	(0)

Managerial career
- 1997–2000: River Plate (PY)
- 2001: Paraguay
- 2003–2004: Libertad
- 2005: 12 de Octubre
- 2006: Macará
- 2007–2008: 3 de Febrero
- 2008–2009: Trinidense
- 2009: José Gálvez
- 2012–2013: Paraguay U-20
- 2013–2014: Paraguay
- 2016–2017: General Caballero
- 2017: Boca Unidos
- 2018: Independiente F.B.C.

Víctor Genes (29 June 1961 – 17 March 2019) was a Paraguayan football player and manager. An attacking midfielder, he played professional football in Paraguay for Cerro Porteño. He was the football manager of Paraguay from 2013 to 2014.

== Career ==
Genes played club football for Club 16 de Agosto de Luque, Sportivo Luqueño, Club Libertad, Club Sol de América, Aquidabán, Club Guaraní, Cerro Porteño and Club River Plate.

Genes made his international debut for the Paraguay national team on 14 June 1991 in a Copa Paz de Chico match against Bolivia (1–0 win). He obtained a total number of three international caps, scoring no goals for the national side.

After he retired from playing, Genes became a football coach. He managed the Paraguay national team during the 2001 Carlsberg Cup. He led Club Libertad to the 2003 Paraguayan Primera División title, before moving to Ecuador to manage Club Social y Deportivo Macará. He also managed José Gálvez FBC in Peru.
