= Édson Uribe =

Peruvian footballer

Personal information
- Full name: Julio Édson Uribe Elera
- Date of birth: 9 May 1982 (age 44)
- Place of birth: Lima, Peru
- Height: 1.71 m (5 ft 7 in)
- Position: Midfielder

Senior career*
Years	Team	Apps	(Gls)
1999–2000	Juan Aurich	4	(0)
2001	Deportivo Maldonado	10	(0)
2001–2002	Jaguares Colima	0	(0)
2002–2003	Atlético Huracán	3	(0)
2003	Alianza Atlético	1	(0)
2004	Estudiantes Medicina	7	(0)
2005–2006	Unión Huaral	28	(1)
2006	Coronel Bolognesi	5	(0)
2007–2009	Cienciano	69	(4)
2009–2010	Total Chalaco	73	(0)
2011	Târgu Mureş	0	(0)
2011	Unión Comercio	10	(0)
2012	Real Garcilaso	37	(1)
2013–2014	Alianza Lima	29	(0)
2015	Cienciano	10	(0)
2015–2016	Universidad Técnica de Cajamarca	55	(1)

International career
2001	Peru	2	(0)
- * Club domestic league appearances and goals

Julio Édson Uribe Elera (born 9 May 1982 in Lima) is a Peruvian former professional footballer who played as a midfielder. He is the son of Julio César Uribe.

== International career ==
Uribe played for the Peru U20 national team team in the 2001 Sudamericana sub-20.

Uribe made his senior debut with the Peru senior national team against Paraguay in his team's first game in the 2001 Copa América. His father Julio César Uribe was the manager at the time and put Édson in for Abel Lobatón in the 68th minute of the match, which finished in a 3–3 draw. In total he earned two caps for the Peru national team.
