= Luis Núñez (footballer, born May 1980) =

Paraguayan footballer

Personal information
- Full name: Luis Alejandro Núñez
- Date of birth: 3 May 1980 (age 46)
- Place of birth: San Lorenzo, Paraguay
- Height: 1.72 m (5 ft 8 in)
- Position: Midfielder

Team information
- Current team: Sportivo Luqueño
- Number: 7

Senior career*
Years	Team	Apps	(Gls)
2000–2006	Sportivo Luqueño	161	(3)
2006	The Strongest	7	(0)
2007	12 de Octubre	13	(2)
2007–	Sportivo Luqueño	13	(2)
- * Club domestic league appearances and goals as of 7 March 2008

Luis Alejandro Núñez (born 3 May 1980 in San Lorenzo) is a Paraguayan footballer who last played for Sportivo Luqueño.

Núñez was included in the Paraguay national football team at the 2001 Copa America.
