= José Loayza =

Bolivian footballer (born 1976)

Personal information
- Full name: José "Pepe" Loayza Pedraza
- Date of birth: September 9, 1976 (age 50)
- Place of birth: Santa Cruz de la Sierra, Bolivia
- Height: 1.81 m (5 ft 11 1/2 in)
- Position: Defender

Senior career*
Years	Team	Apps	(Gls)
1997–1999	Wilstermann	140	(4)
2000	→ Blooming (loan)	30	(4)
2001–2002	Wilstermann	61	(5)
2003–2004	Blooming	57	(3)
2005	Real Potosí	19	(0)
2006	La Paz	23	(0)
2007	Oriente Petrolero	18	(3)
2008	Real Mamoré	21	(0)
2009	Nacional Potosi	27	(2)
2010	Universitario de Sucre	7	(0)

International career
1999–2003	Bolivia	5	(0)
- * Club domestic league appearances and goals as of September 18, 2009

José Loayza Pedraza (born September 9, 1976, in Santa Cruz de la Sierra) is a Bolivian retired football defender.

== Club career ==
Loayza has spent his entire career in the Liga de Fútbol Profesional Boliviano. His former teams include Jorge Wilstermann, Blooming, Real Potosí, La Paz F.C., Oriente Petrolero, Real Mamoré, Nacional Potosi and finishing his career with Universitario de Sucre.

== National team ==
Between 1999 and 2003, Loayza made 5 appearances for the Bolivia national team.
