= Martín Hidalgo =

Peruvian footballer (born 1976)

Personal information
- Full name: Emilio Martín Hidalgo Conde
- Date of birth: June 15, 1976 (age 50)
- Place of birth: Lima, Peru
- Height: 1.80 m (5 ft 11 in)
- Position: Left wing back

Youth career
- 1993–1994: Sporting Cristal

Senior career*
Years	Team	Apps	(Gls)
1995–1996	Sporting Cristal	31	(2)
1997–1999	Las Palmas	28	(0)
1999–2001	Sporting Cristal	54	(4)
2001–2003	Vélez Sársfield	23	(2)
2003	Colón	10	(0)
2003	Saturn Moskovskaya Oblast	18	(0)
2004	→ Alianza Lima (loan)	30	(4)
2005	Saturn Moskovskaya Oblast	3	(0)
2005–2006	Libertad	20	(1)
2006–2007	Internacional	16	(0)
2007	→ Grêmio (loan)	10	(0)
2008	Alianza Lima	3	(0)
2009	Deportivo Táchira	5	(0)
2009	Melgar	4	(0)
2010–2011	Cienciano	37	(3)
2013	Los Caimanes	5	(0)

International career
1996–2008	Peru	47	(3)

Managerial career
- 2017: Sporting Cristal (assistant)
- 2019–: Molinos El Pirata (assistant)
- * Club domestic league appearances and goals

Emilio Martín Hidalgo Conde (born June 15, 1976), commonly known as Martín Hidalgo is a Peruvian football coach and a former player who played as a left wingback.

== Club career ==
In late August 2006, he was signed by the current champions of the Copa Libertadores de América, SC Internacional, on loan from the Paraguayan club Libertad until August 30, 2007.

== International career ==
He is a former member of the national team, and has played 47 matches and scored 3 goals since his debut on March 7, 1996.

== Honours ==
- FIFA Club World Cup: 2006
- Recopa Sudamericana: 2007
- Peruvian Championship: 1995, 1996, 2004
- Paraguayan Championship: 2006
