= Juan Jayo =

Peruvian footballer (born 1973)

Personal information
- Full name: Juan José Jayo Legario
- Date of birth: 20 January 1973 (age 53)
- Place of birth: Changuillo District, Peru
- Height: 1.70 m (5 ft 7 in)
- Position: Defensive midfielder

Team information
- Current team: Sport Áncash (manager)

Youth career
- Alianza Lima

Senior career*
Years	Team	Apps	(Gls)
1990–1998	Alianza Lima	214	(11)
1998–2000	Unión de Santa Fe	61	(1)
2000–2001	Celta de Vigo	14	(0)
2001–2002	Las Palmas	18	(0)
2002–2008	Alianza Lima	180	(10)
2008	José Gálvez	9	(0)
2009–2012	Alianza Lima	79	(1)
Total		575	(23)

International career
1994–2008	Peru	97	(1)

Managerial career
- 2015– 2017: Alianza Lima (assistant coach)
- 2018–: Walter Ormeño
- 2018: Alfredo Salinas
- 2018–: Sport Áncash
- * Club domestic league appearances and goals

Juan José Jayo Legario (born 20 January 1973) is a Peruvian football manager and former player. A defensive midfielder, he captained Alianza Lima in the 2012 Torneo Descentralizado.

== Club career ==
Jayo played professional club football for a number of teams in South America and Spain. He has played 440 games for Alianza Lima in Peru and has had spells with Unión de Santa Fe in Argentina, then Celta de Vigo and Las Palmas in Spain.

In 2009, he had a one -year contract for Alianza Lima for his last career.

== International career ==
Jayo was a member of the Peru national team, playing 97 matches and scoring 1 goal from his debut in 1994 until 2008.

== Honours ==
Alianza Lima

- Torneo Descentralizado: 1997, 2003, 2004, 2006
- Apertura: 1997, 2004, 2006
- Clausura: 1997, 2003

Preceded by Ernesto Arakaki	Alianza Lima captain 2009–2012	Succeeded by Henry Quinteros
