= Juan Francisco Hernández =

Peruvian footballer (born 1978)

Personal information
- Full name: Juan Francisco Hernández Díaz
- Date of birth: 24 June 1978 (age 48)
- Place of birth: Lima, Peru
- Height: 1.85 m (6 ft 1 in)
- Position: Centre-back

Team information
- Current team: Cobresol

Senior career*
Years	Team	Apps	(Gls)
1998–1999	Unión Minas	43	(2)
2000–2001	Juan Aurich	60	(5)
2001	Alianza Lima	4	(0)
2002–2004	Alianza Atlético	105	(5)
2005	UCV	40	(7)
2006	Unión Huaral	18	(2)
2006–2007	Cienciano	28	(4)
2007	FBC Melgar	21	(3)
2008–2010	UCV	112	(10)
2011	Sport Boys	21	(0)
2012	Cobresol	18	(1)
2012	Unión Comercio		
2013	Defensor San Alejandro		
2013	Club Deportivo Pacífico FC		
2014	Sport Huancayo		
2015	Deportivo Coopsol		

International career
2001	Peru	2	(0)
- * Club domestic league appearances and goals

Juan Francisco "Manzanon" Hernández Díaz (born 24 June 1978) is a Peruvian former professional footballer who played as a centre-back. He is the older brother of Luis Alberto Hernández.

== Club career ==
Juan Francisco Hernández made his debut in Torneo Descentralizado in the 1998 season with Unión Minas.

In January 2000 he joined Juan Aurich.

== International career ==
Hernández made his debut for the Peru national team in 2001.
