= Alfredo Amarilla =

Paraguayan footballer (born 1972)

Personal information
- Date of birth: 7 October 1972 (age 54)

International career
Years	Team	Apps	(Gls)
1999–2001	Paraguay	7	(0)

Alfredo Amarilla (born 7 October 1972) is a Paraguayan footballer. He played in seven matches for the Paraguay national football team from 1999 to 2001. He was also part of Paraguay's squad for the 2001 Copa América tournament.
