= Roberto Holsen =

Peruvian footballer (born 1976)

Personal information
- Full name: Roberto Carlos Holsen Alvarado
- Date of birth: 10 August 1976 (age 50)
- Place of birth: Callao, Peru
- Height: 1.77 m (5 ft 10 in)
- Position: Forward

Senior career*
Years	Team	Apps	(Gls)
1995	Alianza Lima	6	(0)
1996	Deportivo Municipal	12	(1)
1997	Bella Esperanza		
1998–1999	Alianza Lima	61	(29)
1999–2000	Sporting Cristal	34	(9)
2000–2002	Alianza Lima	76	(32)
2003	Cienciano	11	(4)
2003	Alianza Atlético	17	(8)
2004	Al-Shabab		
2004	Universitario	20	(3)
2004–2005	Universidad César Vallejo	12	(2)
2005	Alianza Lima	11	(1)
2006	Sport Áncash		
2007	Total Clean	13	(6)
2008	Juan Aurich	36	(8)

International career
1999–2003	Peru	22	(5)
- * Club domestic league appearances and goals

Roberto Carlos Holsen Alvarado (born 10 August 1976) is a retired Peruvian footballer who last played for Juan Aurich.

== Club career ==
Holsen has played for a number of clubs in Peru, including Alianza Lima, Sporting Cristal and Cienciano.

== International career ==
Holsen made 22 appearances for the senior Peru national football team from 1999 to 2003.

== Honours ==
Cienciano

- Copa Sudamericana: 2003
