= Pánfilo Escobar =

Paraguayan footballer (born 1974)

Personal information
- Full name: Pánfilo Eugenio Escobar Amarilla
- Date of birth: 7 September 1974 (age 52)
- Place of birth: Luque, Paraguay
- Height: 1.80 m (5 ft 11 in)
- Position: Defender

Senior career*
Years	Team	Apps	(Gls)
2000	Guaraní	7	(0)
2001	Sportivo Luqueño	28	(4)
2002–2003	Nacional	35	(9)
2004	→ Blooming (loan)	27	(4)
2005–2006	Nacional	26	(1)
2007	General Caballero	0	(0)
2007	Deportes Quindío	1	(0)
2008	Técnico Universitario	20	(1)
2009–2010	Sportivo Trinidense	0	(0)
2011	General Díaz	0	(0)
2011–	River Plate		

International career
2001	Paraguay	3	(0)
- * Club domestic league appearances and goals

Pánfilo Eugenio Escobar Amarilla (born 7 September 1974, in Luque) is a Paraguayan football former defender who last played for River Plate. He played professionally in Paraguay, Bolivia, Colombia and Ecuador.

== Career ==
=== Club ===
Escobar started his career in 2000 at Guaraní before playing for Sportivo Luqueño. In 2003, he was transferred to Club Nacional from Asunción where he saw limited playing time, thus he moved to Bolivian club Blooming on a loan in 2004. The following year, he returned to Nacional and played there until the end of the 2006 season. Later, he went abroad to play for Deportes Quindío in Colombia and Técnico Universitario in Ecuador. After a short stint with General Díaz of the Liga Paraguaya: Segunda División, joined in June 2011 to Club River Plate (Asunción).

=== International ===
In 2001, Escobar earned 3 caps for the Paraguay national team. He was also a member of the squad that participated in Copa América 2001.
