= Edgar Robles =

Paraguayan footballer (1977-2016)

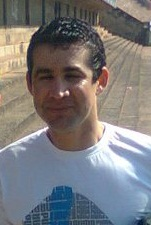

Personal information
- Full name: Edgar Arnulfo Robles Coronel
- Born: 22 November 1977 San Lorenzo
- Died: 28 December 2016 (aged 39) San Lorenzo
- Height: 173 cm (5 ft 8 in)

Sport
- Sport: Association football

Édgar Arnulfo Robles Coronel (Note: In this Spanish name, the first or paternal surname is Robles and the second or maternal family name is Coronel.) (22 November 1977 – 28 December 2016), known as Edgar Robles, was a Paraguayan footballer who played for Club 12 de Octubre of the Primera División in Paraguay.

== Teams ==
- (Paraguay) Sportivo San Lorenzo 2000
- (Paraguay) Libertad 2001–2004
- (Paraguay) 3 de Febrero 2005
- (Paraguay) Libertad 2006–2010
- (Paraguay) Sol de América 2010
- (Paraguay) Olimpia Asunción 2011
- (Paraguay) Sportivo Luqueño 2012–2013
- (Paraguay) 12 de Octubre 2014–2016

== Titles ==
- (Paraguay) Libertad 2002, 2003, 2006 and 2007 (Paraguayan Primera División Championship), 2008 (Torneo Apertura & Clausura Paraguayan Primera División Championship)
