= Santiago Salazar (footballer) =

Peruvian football defender (born 1975)

Personal information
- Full name: Santiago Roberto Salazar Peña
- Date of birth: 2 November 1974 (age 51)
- Place of birth: Lima, Peru
- Height: 1.69 m (5 ft 6 1/2 in)
- Position: Rightback

Senior career*
Years	Team	Apps	(Gls)
1996–1998	Sport Boys	61	(2)
1999–2000	Sporting Cristal	65	(1)
2001–2002	Trabzonspor	6	(0)
2002–2003	Sport Boys	30	(2)
2004–2005	USMP	57	(0)
2005–2006	Al-Shamal	0	(0)
2006–2008	Alianza Lima	82	(0)
2009	Universidad César Vallejo	18	(0)
2010	José Gálvez	29	(1)
2011–2013	Sport Boys	20	(0)
Total		368	(6)

International career^{‡}
1998–2006	Peru	13	(0)
- * Club domestic league appearances and goals as of 15 May 2016 ‡ National team caps and goals as of 15 May 2016

Santiago Roberto Salazar Peña (born November 2, 1974) is a Peruvian retired football defender.

== Club career ==
He had three spells with Peruvian First Division club Sport Boys, playing as a center back.

== International career ==
Salazar played for the Peru national team 13 times between 1998 and 2006.
