= Pedro Ascoy =

Peruvian footballer (born 1980)

Personal information
- Full name: Pedro Luis Ascoy Cortez
- Date of birth: August 10, 1980 (age 46)
- Place of birth: Guadalupe, Peru
- Height: 1.76 m (5 ft 9 in)
- Position: Winger

Senior career*
Years	Team	Apps	(Gls)
1998–1999	Alianza Lima	9	(1)
2000	Deportivo UPAO	13	(4)
2000	Unión Minas	17	(8)
2001	Juan Aurich	21	(16)
2001	Alianza Lima	13	(0)
2002	Sport Coopsol Trujillo	28	(12)
2003	Cienciano	4	(0)
2003	Estudiantes de Medicina	12	(0)
2004–2005	Alianza Atlético	35	(11)
2005	UCV	7	(1)
2006	Sport Ancash	11	(2)
2006–2008	Alianza Atlético	89	(20)
2009–2011	Juan Aurich	88	(13)
2012	Manta	15	(1)
2012	UCV	6	(0)
2013	León de Huánuco	33	(10)
2014	Universidad Técnica de Cajamarca	0	(0)
2014	Los Caimanes	1	(0)

International career
2001	Peru	2	(0)
- * Club domestic league appearances and goals

Pedro Luis Ascoy Cortez (born August 10, 1980) is a Peruvian former professional footballer who played as a winger.

== Club career ==
Ascoy was born in Guadalupe, Peru. He made his Peruvian First Division debut in the 1998 season with Peruvian club Alianza Lima. He also scored his first goal in the First Division in the 1999 season while wearing Alianza Lima colors.

== Honours ==
Juan Aurich

- Peruvian First Division: 2011
