= Luis Hernández (footballer, born 1981) =

Peruvian footballer (born 1981)

Personal information
- Full name: Luis Alberto Hernández Díaz
- Date of birth: 15 February 1981 (age 45)
- Place of birth: Lima, Peru
- Height: 1.79 m (5 ft 10 in)
- Position: Midfielder

Team information
- Current team: Universidad César Vallejo (manager)

Youth career
- Cantolao
- Alianza Lima

Senior career*
Years	Team	Apps	(Gls)
1998–2002	Alianza Lima	89	(6)
2003–2005	Coronel Bolognesi	124	(4)
2006	Universitario	19	(0)
2006	Coronel Bolognesi	20	(2)
2007	Alianza Lima	7	(0)
2007	Coronel Bolognesi	7	(0)
2008	Universidad César Vallejo	16	(1)
2009	CNI	25	(0)
2010	Universitario	14	(0)
2011	Cobresol	22	(1)
2012–2013	Sport Huancayo	62	(4)
2014–2015	Melgar	29	(0)
2016	Cienciano	21	(3)
2017	Sport Boys	2	(0)
Total		457	(21)

International career
2001–2008	Peru	9	(0)

Managerial career
- 2018–2020: Sport Boys (youth)
- 2018: Sport Boys (caretaker)
- 2021–2023: Universidad César Vallejo (youth)
- 2024: Universidad César Vallejo (assistant)
- 2024–: Universidad César Vallejo
- * Club domestic league appearances and goals

Luis Alberto "Manzanita" Hernández Díaz (born 15 February 1981) is a Peruvian football manager and former player who played as a midfielder. He is the current manager of Universidad César Vallejo.

Hernández is the younger brother of Juan Francisco Hernández.

== Club career ==
Luis Alberto Hernández made his league debut in the Torneo Descentralizado in the 1998 season with Alianza Lima, making 8 appearances in that season. He played for Alianza until the end of the 2002 season.

Then for the 2003 season Luis Alberto joined Coronel Bolognesi.

== Honours ==
Coronel Bolognesi

- Torneo Clausura: 2007

FBC Melgar

- Peruvian Primera División: 2015

Sport Boys

- Peruvian Segunda División: 2017
