= Juan Pajuelo =

Peruvian footballer and manager (born 1974)

Personal information
- Full name: Juan Luciano Pajuelo Chávez
- Date of birth: 23 September 1974 (age 52)
- Place of birth: Lima, Peru
- Height: 1.83 m (6 ft 0 in)
- Position: Defender

Senior career*
Years	Team	Apps	(Gls)
1991–1994	Alianza Lima		
1994–1997	Deportivo Municipal	80	(5)
1997–2000	Universitario	114	(3)
2000–2001	Los Andes	17	(1)
2001	Bachilleres		
2002	Atlas	2	(0)
2002–2003	Estudiantes LP	9	(0)
2003–2004	Universitario	55	(2)
2005	Atlético Universidad	19	(2)
2005–2007	Ionikos	21	(0)
2008	Juan Aurich	17	(0)
2008	Olímpico Aurora		
2009	Sport Boys	19	(0)
2010	José Gálvez	11	(1)

International career
1999–2003	Peru	25	(3)

Managerial career
- 2014–2015: Universitario (assistant)
- 2015: Universitario (caretaker)
- 2016: Atlético Torino
- 2018: Comerciantes Unidos
- 2019–2022: Universitario (reserves)
- 2021: Universitario (interim)
- 2022: Deportivo Municipal
- * Club domestic league appearances and goals

Juan Luciano Pajuelo Chávez (born 23 September 1974) is a Peruvian football manager and former player who played as a defender.

== Club career ==
Born in Lima, Pajuelo played for most of his career with Alianza Lima, Deportivo Municipal and Universitario de Deportes in the Primera División Peruana. He also had spells with Los Andes and Estudiantes de La Plata in the Primera División Argentina, Atlas in the Primera División de México and Ionikos in the Super League Greece.

== International career ==
Pajuelo also made 25 appearances for the senior Peru national football team from 1999 to 2003.

== Managerial career ==
In March 2014, Pajuelo was hired as an assistant manager for his former club Universitario. On 1 September 2015, manager Luis Fernando Suárez was fired and Pajuelo took over as a caretaker manager. It only lasted for some days, before Roberto Challe was hired.

Pajuelo left Universitario at the end of 2015, and became the manager of Atlético Torino for the 2016 season. He was fired on 19 May 2016 due to bad results.

In July 2018, he then became the manager of Comerciantes Unidos. He was fired again after two months. In January 2019, he returned to Universitario and was hired as the reserve team manager.
