= Daniel Sanabria =

Paraguayan footballer (born 1977)

Personal information
- Full name: Daniel Horacio Sanabria Gueyraud
- Date of birth: 8 February 1977 (age 49)
- Place of birth: Asunción, Paraguay
- Height: 1.77 m (5 ft 10 in)
- Position: Defender

Senior career*
Years	Team	Apps	(Gls)
1995–1998	Sport Colombia		
1999	12 de Octubre		
2000	Shonan Bellmare	15	(3)
2001–2005	Libertad	88	(5)
2002	→ Kyoto Purple Sanga (loan)	0	(0)
2005	→ Colo-Colo (loan)	12	(1)
2005	→ Sportivo Luqueño (loan)	18	(2)
2006	Olimpia Asunción	7	(0)
2007	América-SP	5	(0)
2008	Independiente Medellín	34	(2)
2009	General Caballero ZC		
2011	Deportivo Quevedo		(2)
2013	FAS		

International career
2001–2003	Paraguay	7	(0)
- * Club domestic league appearances and goals

Daniel Horacio Sanabria Gueyraud (born 8 February 1977) is a former Paraguayan footballer who played as a defender.

== Career ==
During his career, he played for Sportivo Luqueño, Club Libertad, Colo-Colo, Shonan Bellmare (Japan), Kyoto Purple Sanga (Japan), América-SP (Brazil), Olimpia Asunción, General Caballero ZC, among others.

Sanabria played for the Paraguay national football team (6 caps, 0 goals) and was a participant at the 2002 FIFA World Cup.

== Club statistics ==
Club performance			League		Cup		League Cup		Total	
Season	Club	League	Apps	Goals	Apps	Goals	Apps	Goals	Apps	Goals
Japan			League		Emperor's Cup		J.League Cup		Total	
2000	Shonan Bellmare	J2 League	15	3	3	1	2	0	20	4
Paraguay			League		Cup		League Cup		Total	
2001	Libertad	Primera División	29	2					29	2
2002	Libertad	Primera División	15	0					15	0
Japan			League		Emperor's Cup		J.League Cup		Total	
2002	Kyoto Purple Sanga	J1 League	0	0	0	0	0	0	0	0
Paraguay			League		Cup		League Cup		Total	
2003	Libertad	Primera División	15	1					15	1
2004	Libertad	Primera División	29	2					29	2
Chile			League		Copa Chile		League Cup		Total	
2005	Colo-Colo	Primera División	10	1					10	1
Paraguay			League		Cup		League Cup		Total	
2005	Sportivo Luqueño	Primera División	18	2					18	2
2006	Olimpia	Primera División	7	0					7	0
Brazil			League		Copa do Brasil		League Cup		Total	
2007	América-SP		0	0					0	0
Colombia			League		Cup		League Cup		Total	
2008	Independiente Medellín	Primera A	34	2					34	2
Country	Japan		15	3	3	1	2	0	20	4
Country	Paraguay		113	7					113	7
Country	Chile		10	1					10	1
Country	Brazil		0	0					0	0
Country	Colombia		34	2					34	2
Total			172	13	3	1	2	0	177	14

== National team statistics ==
Paraguay national team
Year	Apps	Goals
2001	6	0
2002	0	0
2003	1	0
Total	7	0
