= Wálter Zevallos =

Peruvian footballer (born 1973)

Walter "La Macha" Zeballos
Personal information
- Full name: Walter Hugo Zeballos Franco
- Date of birth: 15 April 1973 (age 53)
- Place of birth: Nazca, Peru
- Positions: Defender; midfielder

Senior career*
| Years | Team | Apps | (Gls) |
| -2000 | FBC Melgar | | |
| 2001-2003 | Alianza Lima | | |
| 2003 | Atlético Universidad | | |
| 2004-2005 | Sportivo Huracán | | |
| 2006-2010 | FBC Melgar | | |

International career
| 2000-2001 | Peru | 5 | (0) |
- * Club domestic league appearances and goals

Walter Hugo Zeballos Franco (born 15 April 1973) is a Peruvian retired footballer.
