= Gustavo Tempone =

Peruvian footballer (born 1971)

Personal information
- Date of birth: 14 April 1971 (age 55)
- Place of birth: Mar del Plata, Argentina
- Height: 1.76 m (5 ft 9 1/2 in)
- Position: Midfielder

Senior career*
Years	Team	Apps	(Gls)
1989–1990	San Lorenzo		
1990–1991	Bnei Yehuda		
1991–1993	San Lorenzo		
1993	Universitario		
1994	Deportivo Pereira		
1994–1995	Deportivo Wanka		
1995–1996	Alianza Lima		
1997	Deportivo Municipal		
1998	San Martín (T)		
1998	Sporting Cristal		
1999	FBC Melgar		
1999	Godoy Cruz		
2000–2002	Sport Boys		
2002	Cienciano		
2003	Aldosivi		
2004	USV		

International career
2000–2001	Peru	5	(0)
- * Club domestic league appearances and goals

Gustavo Tempone (born 14 April 1971) is a Peruvian footballer. He played in five matches for the Peru national football team from 2000 to 2001. He was also part of Peru's squad for the 2001 Copa América tournament.
