= Gustavo Morínigo =

Paraguayan footballer and manager (born 1977)

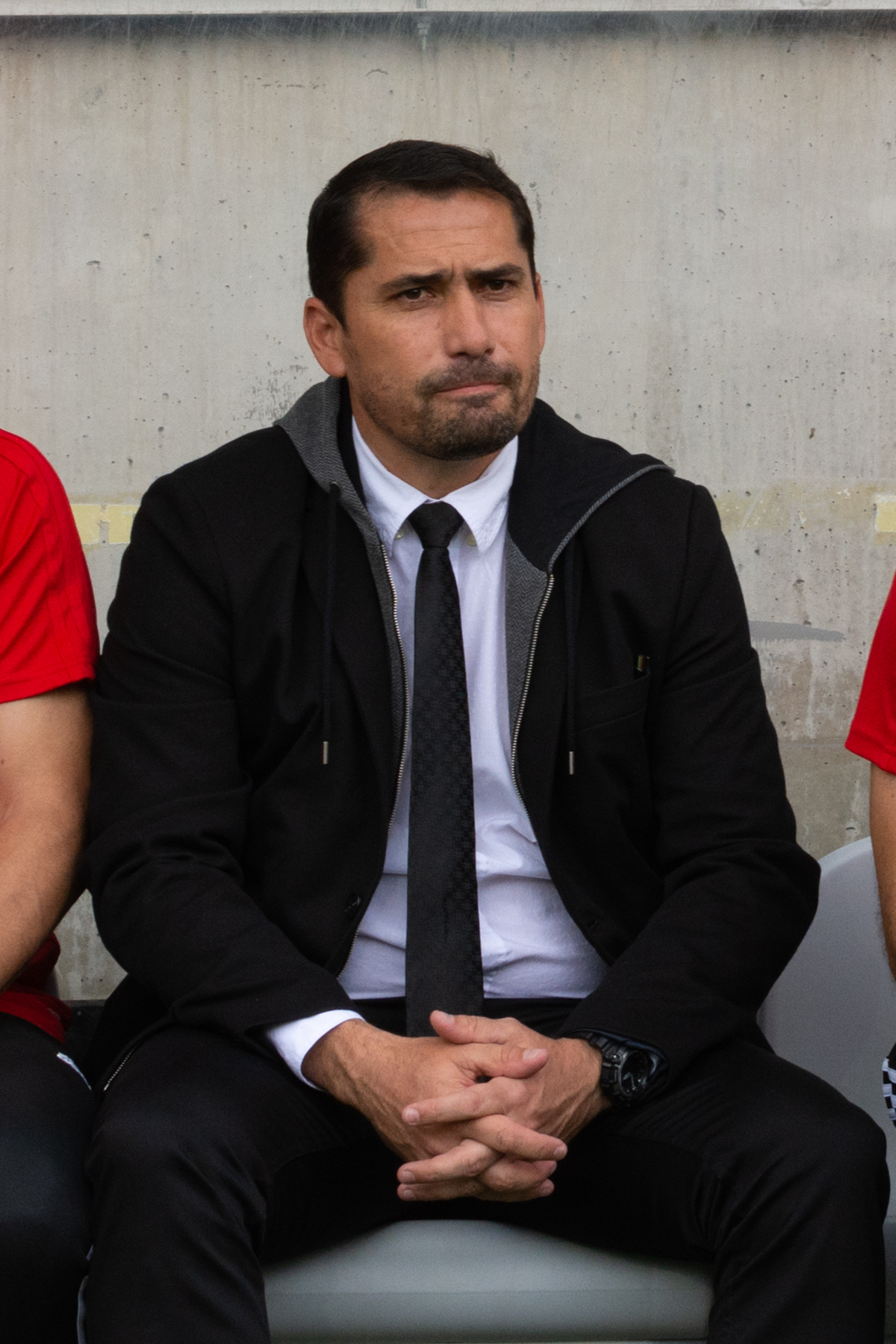
- Morínigo in 2018

Personal information
- Full name: Gustavo Eliseo Morínigo Vázquez
- Date of birth: 23 January 1977 (age 49)
- Place of birth: Coronel Oviedo, Paraguay
- Position: Midfielder

Senior career*
Years	Team	Apps	(Gls)
1996–1998	Libertad	30	(2)
1999–2000	Guaraní	42	(3)
2001–2004	Libertad	103	(31)
2004–2005	Argentinos Juniors	12	(4)
2005	Libertad	11	(1)
2006	Deportivo Cali	11	(2)
2007	Cerro Porteño	13	(1)
2007–2011	Nacional Asunción	85	(13)

International career
1997	Paraguay U20		
2001–2005	Paraguay	18	(3)

Managerial career
- 2012–2015: Nacional Asunción
- 2015–2016: Paraguay U20
- 2016: Cerro Porteño
- 2017–2020: Paraguay U17
- 2018: Paraguay (interim)
- 2020: Paraguay U20
- 2020: Libertad
- 2021–2022: Coritiba
- 2023: Ceará
- 2023: Avaí
- 2024: Remo
- 2025: Sportivo Luqueño
- 2026: Rubio Ñu
- * Club domestic league appearances and goals

Gustavo Eliseo Morínigo Vázquez (born 23 January 1977) is a Paraguayan football manager and former player who played as a midfielder.

== Club career ==
Born in Coronel Oviedo, Morínigo was a Libertad youth graduate. He made his first team debut in 1996, but left the club ahead of the 1999 season after signing for Guaraní.

Morínigo returned to Libertad for the 2001 campaign, and moved abroad in 2004 after agreeing to a contract with Argentinos Juniors. After featuring sparingly, he rejoined Libertad for a third spell in the following year.

On 25 January 2006, Morínigo moved to Deportivo Cali, but returned to his home country in the following year with Cerro Porteño. He subsequently signed for Nacional Asunción in 2007, and featured regularly until his retirement in 2011, aged 34.

== International career ==
After representing Paraguay at under-20 level in the 1997 FIFA World Youth Championship, Morínigo made his full international debut on 27 January 2001, starting and scoring his side's only in a 1–1 draw against South Korea, for the year's Lunar New Year Cup.

Morínigo was also included in the final squads for the 2001 Copa América and the 2002 FIFA World Cup.

== Managerial career ==
=== Nacional Asunción ===
On 16 April 2012, Morínigo was named in charge of his former club Nacional, after Javier Torrente resigned. Initially an interim, he was subsequently named manager on a permanent basis, and was chosen as the division's best coach in his first year.

In the 2014 Copa Libertadores, Morínigo led the side to the Finals, but lost to San Lorenzo. On 29 March 2015, he resigned.

=== Paraguay under-20 national team ===
On 31 August 2015, Morínigo was named manager of the Paraguay under-20 team. He was in charge of the side for two friendlies against Uruguay in March 2016 (4–3 win and 2–2 draw).

=== Cerro Porteño ===
On 15 April 2016, Morínigo returned to club duties after being appointed at the helm of another club he represented as a player, Cerro Porteño.

=== Return to Paraguay national teams ===
On 2 August 2016, Morínigo returned to the Paraguayan Football Association, after being named manager of the under-17 national team. On 29 January 2018, he was appointed interim manager of the full side after Francisco Arce left, and managed the side on two friendlies (0–1 against United States and 2–4 against Japan) before returning to his previous role.

Also a coordinator of the youth categories, Morínigo left the national sides on 18 August 2020.

=== Libertad ===
On 24 September 2020, Morínigo was appointed manager of club Libertad. He was sacked on 16 December, after the club's elimination in the 2020 Copa Libertadores.

=== Coritiba ===
On 4 January 2021, Morínigo signed with Brazilian club Coritiba. Despite suffering relegation, he was kept for the 2021 season and led the club back to the top tier.

On 30 November 2021, Morínigo renewed his contract with Coxa until the end of 2022. The following 14 August, he was sacked after entering the relegation zone.

=== Ceará ===
On 22 November 2022, Morínigo was named manager of Ceará, freshly relegated to the second level, for the upcoming campaign. After two consecutive losses in the Série B, he was sacked on 24 April 2023.

=== Avaí ===
On 15 May 2023, Morínigo was named head coach of Avaí also in the Brazilian second division. He was sacked on 2 July, after nine winless matches.

=== Remo ===
On 4 March 2024, Morínigo replaced Ricardo Catalá at the helm of Série C side Remo. He was dismissed on 20 May, after a poor start in the third division.

=== Sportivo Luqueño ===
On 3 February 2025, Morínigo returned to his home country to take over Sportivo Luqueño in the top tier. On 18 May, he was sacked.

=== Rubio Ñu ===
On 11 December 2025, Morínigo was announced as manager of Rubio Ñu, recently promoted to the top tier. The following 7 April, he was sacked.

== Managerial statistics ==
As of 1 July 2023

Managerial record by team and tenure
Team	Nat.	From	To	Record								Ref
Team	Nat.	From	To	G	W	D	L	GF	GA	GD	Win %	Ref
Nacional Asunción	(Paraguay)	16 April 2012	29 March 2015	108	55	21	32	148	107	+41	50.93	
Paraguay U20	(Paraguay)	31 August 2015	15 April 2016	2	1	1	0	6	5	+1	50.00	
Cerro Porteño	(Paraguay)	15 April 2016	15 July 2016	13	3	3	7	21	24	−3	23.08	
Paraguay U17	(Paraguay)	2 August 2016	18 August 2020	27	13	9	5	52	40	+12	48.15	
Paraguay (interim)	(Paraguay)	29 January 2018	3 September 2018	2	0	0	2	2	5	−3	0.00	
Libertad	(Paraguay)	24 September 2020	16 December 2020	18	7	6	5	52	30	+22	38.89	
Coritiba	(Brazil)	4 January 2021	14 August 2022	99	43	22	34	130	112	+18	43.43	
Ceará	(Brazil)	22 November 2022	24 April 2023	24	14	5	5	48	29	+19	58.33	
Avaí	(Brazil)	16 May 2023	3 July 2023	9	0	5	4	5	11	−6	0.00	
Career total				302	136	72	94	464	363	+101	45.03	—

== Honours ==
=== Player ===
Libertad

- Paraguayan Primera División: 2002, 2003

Nacional Asunción

- Paraguayan Primera División: 2009 Clausura, 2011 Apertura

=== Manager ===
Nacional Asunción

- Paraguayan Primera División: 2013 Apertura

Coritiba

- Campeonato Paranaense: Champion 2022
