= Arístides Masi =

Paraguayan footballer (born 1977)

Personal information
- Full name: Arístides Nicolás Masi González
- Date of birth: 14 February 1977 (age 49)
- Place of birth: Asunción, Paraguay
- Height: 1.75 m (5 ft 9 in)
- Position: Forward

Youth career
- River Plate Asunción

Senior career*
| Years | Team | Apps | (Gls) |
| 1997–2005 | Sportivo Luqueño | 65 | (15) |
| 1998 | → Sol de América (loan) | 8 | (0) |
| 2000 | → Sportivo San Lorenzo (loan) | 30 | (7) |
| 2001–2002 | → Salgueiros (loan) | 23 | (0) |
| 2003 | → Olimpia (loan) | 4 | (0) |
| 2003–2004 | → Cerro Porteño (loan) | 14 | (1) |
| 2006 | Audax Italiano | 30 | (5) |
| Total | | 174 | (28) |

International career
| 2001–2002 | Paraguay | 7 | (0) |
- * Club domestic league appearances and goals

Arístides Nicolás Masi González (born 14 January 1977) is a former Paraguayan footballer who played for clubs in Paraguay, Portugal and Chile.

== Career ==
Masi started his career with Sportivo Luqueño at the age of 20. At youth level, he only represented River Plate de Asunción in some matches.

Besides Paraguay, Masi played for Portuguese club Salgueiros in 2001–02 and Chilean club Audax Italiano in 2006.

== Honours ==
=== Player ===
Audax Italiano

- Primera División de Chile (1): Runner-up 2006 Clausura
