= Abel Lobatón =

Peruvian footballer (born 1977)

Personal information
- Full name: Abel Augusto Lobatón Espejo
- Date of birth: 23 November 1977 (age 48)
- Place of birth: Peru
- Position: Striker

Senior career*
Years	Team	Apps	(Gls)
1997–1999	Sport Boys		
1997–1998	→ Lawn Tennis FC (loan)		
2000	Paranaense		
2000	Sport Boys		
2001	Universitario		
2002	Juan Aurich		
2003	Cienciano		
2004	U. César Vallejo		
2004–2005	C.S. Marítimo	5	(0)
2005	S.D. Aucas		
2006	Famagusta FC		
2006	FBC Melgar	10	(2)
2006	Sport Boys		
2008	UTC		
2009	Ayacucho FC		
2009	Sport Águila		

International career
1999-2001	Peru	12	(1)
- * Club domestic league appearances and goals

Abel Lobatón (born 23 November 1977) is a Peruvian retired footballer.

== Honours ==
Cienciano

- Copa Sudamericana: 2003

Lawn Tennis FC

- Peruvian Segunda División: 1997
