= Silvio Garay =

Paraguayan footballer (born 1973)

Personal information
- Date of birth: 20 September 1973 (age 53)

International career
Years	Team	Apps	(Gls)
1999–2001	Paraguay	4	(1)

Silvio Garay (born 20 September 1973) is a Paraguayan footballer. He played in four matches for the Paraguay national football team from 1999 to 2001. He was also part of Paraguay's squad for the 2001 Copa América tournament.
