= Miguel Ángel Cáceres =

Paraguayan footballer (born 1978)

Personal information
- Full name: Miguel Ángel Cáceres Báez
- Date of birth: 6 June 1978 (age 48)
- Place of birth: Campo Nuevo, Paraguay
- Height: 1.80 m (5 ft 11 in)
- Position: Forward

Senior career*
Years	Team	Apps	(Gls)
1998–2000	Guaraní	0	(0)
2000	Rosario Central	16	(7)
2001	Levante	10	(2)
2001–2002	Olimpia Asunción		
2002–2003	Badajoz	8	(0)
2003	Nueva Chicago	5	(0)

International career
2000–2001	Paraguay	9	(1)
- * Club domestic league appearances and goals

Miguel Ángel Cáceres Báez (born 6 June 1978) is a Paraguayan former professional footballer who played as a forward.

== Career ==
Cáceres scored a goal for the Paraguay national team in a friendly match vs Australia in 2000.

== Career statistics ==
Óscar Cardozo: International goals
No.	Date	Venue	Opponent	Score	Result	Competition
1	15 June 2000	Olympic Park Stadium (Melbourne), Melbourne, Australia	Australia	2–1	2–1	Friendly
