= Guido Alvarenga =

Paraguayan footballer (born 1970)

Personal information
- Full name: Guido Virgilio Alvarenga Morales
- Date of birth: 24 August 1970 (age 56)
- Place of birth: Asunción, Paraguay
- Height: 1.70 m (5 ft 7 in)
- Position: Midfielder

Senior career*
Years	Team	Apps	(Gls)
1989–1991	Sport Colombia		
1991–1995	Deportivo Mandiyú	114	(15)
1995–1996	Banfield	58	(5)
1997	Universitario		
1998–1999	Cerro Porteño	15	(7)
2000	Kawasaki Frontale	13	(1)
2000–2001	Cerro Porteño	19	(5)
2001–2002	León	12	(1)
2002	Libertad	29	(4)
2003–2006	Olimpia Asunción	61	(7)

International career
1992	Paraguay U23		
1995–2003	Paraguay	24	(3)
- * Club domestic league appearances and goals

Guido Virgilio Alvarenga Morales (born 24 August 1970, in Asunción) is a retired football (soccer) player from Paraguay, who was nicknamed "El Mago". He played as an attacking midfielder during his career.

== International ==
Alvarenga made his international début for the Paraguay national football team on 14 June 1995 in a friendly match against Argentina (2-1 loss). He obtained a total number of 25 international caps, scoring three goals for the national side and was a participant at the 1992 Summer Olympics and at the 2002 FIFA World Cup.

== Club statistics ==
Club performance			League		Cup		League Cup		Total	
Season	Club	League	Apps	Goals	Apps	Goals	Apps	Goals	Apps	Goals
Japan			League		Emperor's Cup		J.League Cup		Total	
2000	Kawasaki Frontale	J1 League	13	1	0	0	2	1	15	2
Total			13	1	0	0	2	1	15	2

== National team statistics ==
Paraguay national team
Year	Apps	Goals
1995	1	0
1996	0	0
1997	0	0
1998	0	0
1999	5	0
2000	2	0
2001	8	2
2002	3	0
2003	5	1
Total	24	3

== Honours ==
=== Club ===
- Olimpia Asunción
  - Recopa Sudamericana: 2003
