= Dani Cáceres =

Paraguayan footballer (born 1973)

Personal information
- Full name: Juan Daniel Cáceres Rivas
- Date of birth: 6 October 1973 (age 53)
- Place of birth: Asunción, Paraguay
- Height: 1.85 m (6 ft 1 in)
- Positions: Left back; centre back

Team information
- Current team: Sportivo Limpeño (assistant)

Youth career
- 1986–1991: Sport Colombia
- 1992–1994: Cerro Porteño

Senior career*
Years	Team	Apps	(Gls)
1994–1997	Cerro Porteño		
1997–1998	Guaraní		
1998	Flamengo	4	(0)
1999	Guaraní		
1999–2000	Huracan		
2000–2002	Cerro Porteño		
2003–2006	Estudiantes de La Plata	114	(2)
2006–2007	Belgrano de Córdoba	32	(0)
2008	Guaraní		
2009	Olimpia Asunción	6	(0)
2009–2010	Rubio Ñu	9	(1)

International career
1999–2001	Paraguay	20	(2)

Managerial career
- 2016–2017: Sportivo Trinidense
- 2018: Sportivo Trinidense
- 2019: 3 de Febrero
- 2023: Deportivo Recoleta (assistant)
- 2024: Deportivo Recoleta
- 2025: Deportivo Capiatá (assistant)
- 2025–: Sportivo Limpeño (assistant)
- * Club domestic league appearances and goals

Juan Daniel "Dani" Cáceres Rivas (born 6 October 1973) is a Paraguayan football coach and former player who played as a defender. He is the current assistant manager of Sportivo Limpeño.

== Career ==
Cáceres started his playing career in the youth divisions of Club Sport Colombia of Paraguay before playing for other Paraguayan clubs in the first division. He also played for Flamengo of Brazil and several teams from Argentina.

Cáceres also played for the Paraguay national football team, and was part of the squad that participated in the 1999 and 2001 Copa America tournaments.

== Career statistics ==
=== International goals ===
#	Date	Venue	Opponent	Score	Result	Competition
1.	28 April 1999	Monumental Río Parapití, Pedro Juan Caballero, Paraguay	Mexico	2–1	Win	Friendly
2.	28 June 2001	Yoyogi National Stadium, Tokyo, Japan	FR Yugoslavia	2–0	Win	2001 Kirin Cup
Correct as of 7 October 2015
