= Estanislao Struway =

Paraguayan footballer (born 1968)

Personal information
- Full name: Estanislao Struway Samaniego
- Date of birth: 25 June 1968 (age 58)
- Place of birth: Itá, Paraguay
- Height: 1.73 m (5 ft 8 in)
- Position: Defensive midfielder

Senior career*
Years	Team	Apps	(Gls)
1988–1994	Cerro Porteño		
1994–1995	Racing Club	16	(0)
1995–1996	Los Andes	12	(0)
1996	Sporting Cristal	21	(0)
1997	Portuguesa	5	(0)
1998–1999	Coritiba	32	(1)
1999–2002	Cerro Porteño		
2002–2003	Libertad		
2004	12 de Octubre		
2005	Sportivo Iteño		

International career
1991–2002	Paraguay	74	(4)
- * Club domestic league appearances and goals as of April 2008

Estanislao Struway Samaniego (born 25 June 1968) is a Paraguayan football coach and former midfielder from who was nicknamed Taní during his career. He is the current coach of División Intermedia team Sportivo Iteño.

== Club ==
At club level Struway spent most of his career in Paraguay where he won five league titles. He also played at professional level in Argentina, Peru and Brazil. His first club was Cerro Porteño where he made his debut in 1988, he won two Paraguayan league titles in his first spell with the club in 1990 and 1992.

Struway joined Argentine Racing Club de Avellaneda in 1995 but never settled, he joined 2nd division Los Andes the next season. In 1996, he played for Sporting Cristal in Peru.

Struway played in Brazil in the late 1990s, making appearances for Portuguesa and Coritiba. In the former, he protagonized an unusual episode during a Campeonato Brasileiro match: learning that he would be substituted, Struway angrily took off his shirt and threw it on the ground, resulting in him receiving a red card instead. The club released him shortly afterwards.

In 1999, he returned to Cerro Porteño where he won another Paraguayan league title in 2001. In 2002, he moved to Libertad where he was part of two more league championship winning campaigns. He spent his last years playing for 12 de Octubre and then Sportivo Iteño before his retirement in 2005.

== International ==
Struway made his international debut for the Paraguay national football team on 27 February 1991 in a friendly match against Brazil (1-1). He obtained a total number of 74 international caps, scoring four goals for the national side. He played in the 2002 FIFA World Cup and in five editions of the Copa América: 1991, 1993, 1995, 1997 and 2001

== Honours ==
=== Club ===
- Cerro Porteño
  - Paraguayan Primera División: 1990, 1992, 2001
- Sporting Cristal
  - Peruvian Primera División: 1996
- Coritiba
  - Campeonato Paranaense: 1999
- Libertad
  - Paraguayan Primera División: 2002, 2003
