= 2001 Copa América Group A =

Group A of the 2001 Copa América was one of the three groups of competing nations in the 2001 Copa América. It comprised Colombia, Chile, Ecuador, and Venezuela. Group play ran from 11 to 17 July 2001.

Colombia won the group and faced Peru, the second-best third-placed finishers, in the quarter-finals. Chile finished second and faced Mexico—the runners-up of Group B—in the quarter-finals. Ecuador and Venezuela finished third and fourth in the group, respectively, and were eliminated from the tournament.

== Standings ==
Team	Pld	W	D	L	GF	GA	GD	Pts
Colombia	3	3	0	0	5	0	+5	9
Chile	3	2	0	1	5	3	+2	6
Ecuador	3	1	0	2	5	5	0	3
Venezuela	3	0	0	3	0	7	−7	0

Teams that advanced to the quarter-finals
- Group winners
- Group runners-up
- Best two third-placed teams among all groups

All times are in local, Colombia Time (UTC−05:00).

== Matches ==
=== Ecuador vs Chile ===
11 July 2001
18:00

Ecuador	1–4	Chile
Chalá 52'	Report	Navia 29'; Montecinos 72', 90'; Corrales 84'

Estadio Metropolitano, Barranquilla
Attendance: 40,000
Referee: René Ortubé (Bolivia)

Ecuador	Chile

GK	12	Oswaldo Ibarra
DF	4	Ulises de la Cruz
DF	3	Iván Hurtado
DF	17	Giovanny Espinoza
DF	6	Raúl Guerrón
MF	19	Édison Méndez		(substituted off) 46'
MF	20	Edwin Tenorio	(yellow card) 51'	(substituted off) 84'
MF	10	Álex Aguinaga		(substituted off) 64'
MF	16	Cléber Chalá	(yellow card) 66' (red card) 77'
FW	13	Ángel Fernández
FW	11	Agustín Delgado	(yellow card) 65'
Substitutions:
DF	18	Alfonso Obregón		(substituted on) 46'
MF	21	Wellington Sánchez		(substituted on) 64'
FW	8	Ebelio Ordóñez		(substituted on) 84'
Manager:
(Colombia) Hernán Darío Gómez

GK	1	Sergio Vargas
DF	5	Luis Fuentes	(yellow card) 52'
DF	6	Pedro Reyes
DF	16	Ricardo Rojas
DF	14	Mauricio Aros
MF	17	Moisés Villarroel		(substituted off) 79'
MF	18	Marco Villaseca
MF	3	Claudio Maldonado		(substituted off) 65'
MF	8	Alejandro Osorio
FW	9	Reinaldo Navia		(substituted off) 73'
FW	15	Cristián Montecinos
Substitutions:
MF	11	Rodrigo Valenzuela		(substituted on) 65'
FW	13	Marcelo Corrales		(substituted on) 73'
DF	4	David Henríquez		(substituted on) 79'
Manager:
Pedro García

=== Colombia vs Venezuela ===
11 July 2001
20:45

Colombia	2–0	Venezuela
Grisales 15'; Aristizábal 59' (pen.)	Report

Estadio Metropolitano, Barranquilla
Attendance: 50,000
Referee: Gilberto Hidalgo (Peru)

Colombia	Venezuela

GK	1	Óscar Córdoba
DF	16	Jersson González
DF	2	Iván Córdoba	(yellow card) 66'
DF	3	Mario Yepes
DF	4	Roberto Carlos Cortés
MF	20	Gerardo Bedoya
MF	13	John Restrepo		(substituted off) 78'
MF	24	Giovanni Hernández
MF	19	Freddy Grisales
FW	10	Víctor Aristizábal		(substituted off) 78'
FW	18	Jairo Castillo		(substituted off) 46'
Substitutions:
FW	11	Eudalio Arriaga		(substituted on) 46'
FW	7	Elson Becerra		(substituted on) 78'
MF	8	David Ferreira		(substituted on) 78'
Manager:
Francisco Maturana

GK	1	Rafael Dudamel
DF	2	Luis Vallenilla	(yellow card) 30' (yellow-red card) 47'
DF	3	José Manuel Rey
DF	4	Wilfredo Alvarado
DF	17	Jorge Rojas
MF	5	Miguel Mea Vitali
MF	8	Luis Vera
MF	11	Ricardo Páez		(substituted off) 85'
MF	18	Juan Arango
FW	7	Daniel Noriega		(substituted off) 54'
FW	9	Alexander Rondón		(substituted off) 79'
Substitutions:
MF	14	Leopoldo Jiménez		(substituted on) 54'
FW	16	Cristian Cásseres		(substituted on) 79'
MF	15	Giovanny Pérez		(substituted on) 85'
Manager:
Richard Páez

=== Chile vs Venezuela ===
14 July 2001
16:15

Chile	1–0	Venezuela
Montecinos 78'	Report

Estadio Metropolitano, Barranquilla
Attendance: 33,000
Referee: Gilberto Alcalá (Mexico)

Chile	Venezuela

GK	1	Sergio Vargas
DF	5	Luis Fuentes	(yellow card) 21'
DF	6	Pedro Reyes
DF	16	Ricardo Rojas
DF	14	Mauricio Aros		(substituted off) 46'
MF	17	Moisés Villarroel		(substituted off) 28'
MF	18	Marco Villaseca
MF	19	Pablo Galdames
MF	8	Alejandro Osorio		(substituted off) 66'
FW	9	Reinaldo Navia
FW	15	Cristián Montecinos
Substitutions:
DF	4	David Henríquez	(yellow card) 64'	(substituted on) 28'
DF	7	Eros Pérez		(substituted on) 46'
MF	11	Rodrigo Valenzuela		(substituted on) 66'
Manager:
Pedro García

GK	1	Rafael Dudamel
DF	3	José Manuel Rey
DF	4	Wilfredo Alvarado	(yellow card) 31'
DF	6	Elvis Martínez
DF	13	Leonel Vielma
MF	5	Miguel Mea Vitali	(yellow card) 76'
MF	8	Luis Vera
MF	10	Gabriel Urdaneta		(substituted off) 72'
MF	11	Ricardo Páez		(substituted off) 63'
MF	18	Juan Arango
FW	7	Daniel Noriega		(substituted off) 78'
Substitutions:
FW	9	Alexander Rondón		(substituted on) 63'
MF	15	Giovanni Pérez		(substituted on) 72'
MF	20	Héctor Gonzalez		(substituted on) 78'
Manager:
Richard Páez

=== Colombia vs Ecuador ===
14 July 2001
18:30

Colombia	1–0	Ecuador
Aristizábal 29'	Report

Estadio Metropolitano, Barranquilla
Attendance: 40,000
Referee: Ubaldo Aquino (Paraguay)

Colombia	Ecuador

GK	1	Óscar Córdoba
DF	3	Mario Yepes
DF	2	Iván Córdoba
DF	16	Jersson González
DF	20	Gerardo Bedoya
MF	17	Juan Carlos Ramírez
MF	13	John Restrepo
MF	24	Giovanni Hernández		(substituted off) 74'
MF	19	Freddy Grisales
FW	15	Elkin Murillo
FW	10	Víctor Aristizábal	(yellow card) 49'	(substituted off) 68'
Substitutions:
FW	11	Eudalio Arriaga	(yellow card) 80'	(substituted on) 68'
MF	23	Mauricio Molina		(substituted on) 74'
Manager:
Francisco Maturana

GK	1	José Cevallos
DF	3	Iván Hurtado
DF	4	Ulises de la Cruz
DF	6	Raúl Guerrón		(substituted off) 46'
DF	17	Giovanny Espinoza
MF	5	Juan Carlos Burbano
MF	10	Álex Aguinaga	(yellow card) (yellow-red card) 81'
MF	18	Alfonso Obregón		(substituted off) 46'
MF	19	Édison Méndez
FW	11	Agustín Delgado
FW	13	Ángel Fernández
Substitutions:
MF	20	Edwin Tenorio	(yellow card) 74'	(substituted on) 46'
MF	21	Wellington Sánchez		(substituted on) 46'
Manager:
(Colombia) Hernán Darío Gómez

=== Ecuador vs Venezuela ===
17 July 2001
18:30

Ecuador	4–0	Venezuela
Delgado 19', 63'; Fernández 29'; Méndez 60'	Report

Estadio Metropolitano, Barranquilla
Attendance: 20,000
Referee: Gilberto Hidalgo (Peru)

Ecuador	Venezuela

GK	12	Oswaldo Ibarra
DF	3	Iván Hurtado
DF	4	Ulises de la Cruz
DF	6	Raúl Guerrón	(yellow card) 49'
DF	17	Giovanny Espinoza
MF	5	Juan Carlos Burbano
MF	16	Cléber Chalá		(substituted off) 78'
MF	19	Édison Méndez
MF	21	Wellington Sánchez	(yellow card) 16'	(substituted off) 76'
FW	11	Agustín Delgado
FW	13	Ángel Fernández
Substitutions:
MF	7	Juan Aguinaga		(substituted on) 76'
DF	18	Alfonso Obregón		(substituted on) 78'
Manager:
(Colombia) Hernán Darío Gómez

GK	1	Rafael Dudamel
DF	3	José Manuel Rey
DF	4	Wilfredo Alvarado
DF	6	Elvis Martínez
DF	13	Leonel Vielma
MF	5	Miguel Mea Vitali		(substituted off) 74'
MF	8	Luis Vera	(yellow card) 43'
MF	10	Gabriel Urdaneta
MF	11	Ricardo Páez	(yellow card) 47'	(substituted off) 69'
MF	18	Juan Arango		(substituted off) 46'
FW	7	Daniel Noriega
Substitutions:
FW	9	Alexander Rondón		(substituted on) 46'
MF	14	Leopoldo Jiménez		(substituted on) 69'
MF	15	Giovanni Pérez		(substituted on) 74'
Manager:
Richard Páez

=== Colombia vs Chile ===
17 July 2001
20:45

Colombia	2–0	Chile
Aristizábal 10' (pen.); Arriaga 90'	Report

Estadio Metropolitano, Barranquilla
Attendance: 50,000
Referee: Jorge Larrionda (Uruguay)

Colombia	Chile

GK	12	Miguel Calero
DF	14	Iván López
DF	2	Iván Córdoba	(yellow card) 90+1'
DF	3	Mario Yepes
DF	20	Gerardo Bedoya
MF	6	Fabián Vargas	(yellow card) 26'	(substituted off) 67'
MF	17	Juan Carlos Ramírez
MF	24	Giovanni Hernández		(substituted off) 73'
MF	19	Freddy Grisales
FW	10	Víctor Aristizábal		(substituted off) 46'
FW	15	Elkin Murillo	(red card) 34'
Substitutions:
FW	7	Elson Becerra		(substituted on) 46'
FW	11	Eudalio Arriaga	(yellow card) 74'	(substituted on) 67'
MF	23	Mauricio Molina		(substituted on) 73'
Manager:
Francisco Maturana

GK	1	Sergio Vargas
DF	6	Pedro Reyes
DF	16	Ricardo Rojas
DF	2	Mauricio Pozo	(yellow card) 13'
DF	7	Eros Pérez
MF	3	Claudio Maldonado
MF	18	Marco Villaseca
MF	19	Pablo Galdames	(red card) 34'
MF	11	Rodrigo Valenzuela		(substituted off) 63'
FW	9	Reinaldo Navia		(substituted off) 46'
FW	15	Cristián Montecinos
Substitutions:
FW	13	Marcelo Corrales		(substituted on) 46' (substituted off) 71'
FW	10	Manuel Neira		(substituted on) 63'
MF	20	Rodrigo Núñez		(substituted on) 71'
Manager:
Pedro García
