= Joffre Guerrón =

Ecuadorian footballer (born 1985)

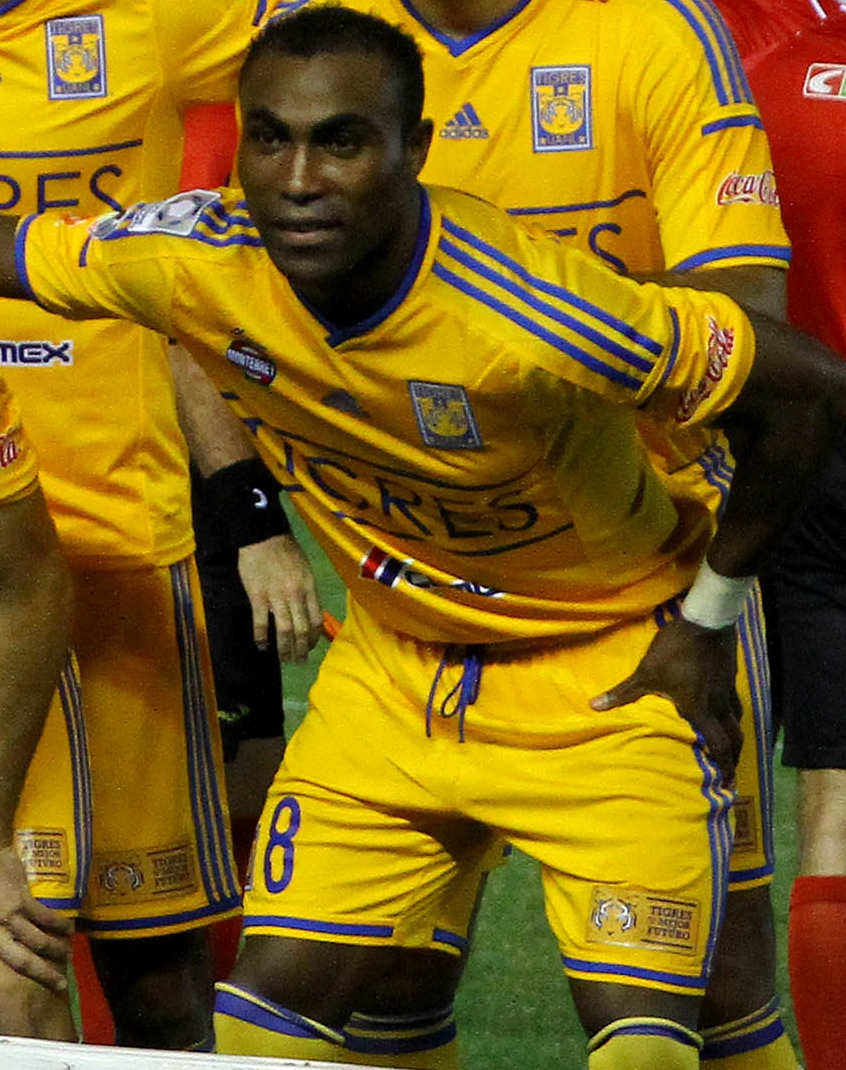
- Guerrón in 2015

Personal information
- Full name: Joffre David Guerrón Méndez
- Date of birth: 28 April 1985 (age 41)
- Place of birth: Ambuquí, Imbabura, Ecuador
- Height: 1.80 m (5 ft 11 in)
- Positions: Right winger; striker

Youth career
- 1998–2004: Aucas
- 2004–2005: Boca Juniors

Senior career*
Years	Team	Apps	(Gls)
2002–2004	Aucas	59	(8)
2006–2008	LDU Quito	67	(8)
2008–2010	Getafe	14	(1)
2009–2010	→ Cruzeiro (loan)	19	(3)
2010–2012	Atlético Paranaense	42	(7)
2012–2014	Beijing Guoan	46	(14)
2014–2015	Tigres UANL	50	(13)
2016	Cruz Azul	24	(1)
2017	Pumas UNAM	10	(0)
2018–2019	Barcelona S.C.	6	(0)
Total		337	(55)

International career
2007–2013	Ecuador	18	(0)
- * Club domestic league appearances and goals

Joffre David Guerrón Méndez (Spanish pronunciation: [ˈɟʝofɾe ɣeˈron]; (Note: In isolation, Guerrón is pronounced [ɡeˈron].) born 28 April 1985), commonly known as Joffre Guerrón, is a retired Ecuadorian professional footballer who played as a right winger and striker for the Ecuador national football team.

Known for his explosiveness, Guerrón is considered one of the best Ecuadorian players of the 2000s and early 2010s. He was awarded as the 2008 and 2015 Copa Libertadores MVP. Besides his native Ecuador, Guerrón has played in countries such as Argentina, Spain, Brazil, China and Mexico.

Nicknamed Dinamita (Spanish for dynamite), he is also known among fans for his humbleness and love to Latin music such as reggaeton and salsa.

== Early life ==
Joffre David Guerrón Méndez was born in a small Ecuadorian village called Ambuquí in Imbabura Province, from which other important players in Ecuadorian football have emerged, such as Édison Méndez, Agustín Delgado, Ulises de la Cruz and Giovanny Espinoza.

== Club career ==
=== Youth career ===
Guerrón made his debut in the top Ecuadorian division with SD Aucas at the age of 16. He was then transferred to Argentine club Boca Juniors where he played in the lower divisions of the team; however, he never got a chance to debut with the senior team. In 2006, he returned to Ecuador, this time to LDU Quito, at the request of the then manager, Juan Carlos Oblitas.

=== LDU Quito ===
In 2007, Guerrón began to hold a starting 11 position, with the new manager Edgardo Bauza. Guerron would finish the 2007 Serie A season as champion, bringing the club its 9th league title. He competed in the 2008 Copa Libertadores with LDU Quito, scoring against Libertad of Paraguay with an individual play, and also against Estudiantes de La Plata, where Guerron took the ball individually past several defenders and shot the football past the small space left on the goal-keeper's left side. Guerron in the semi-final versus Club America received a long pass from Jayro Campos on the right side of the field, dribbled past his defender to send the ball past Guillermo Ochoa and leave it for Luis Bolanos to just head the ball in, resulting in an important 1–1 away result. After drawing to America 0–0 at home, Liga reached the final where Guerrón played an important role in the victory over Fluminense, scoring a goal in the first leg, then putting in an energetic performance before scoring LDU's third goal in the 3–1 penalty shootout victory. He was chosen by FIFA, through an election, as the best player of the 2008 Copa Libertadores.

=== Getafe ===
On 6 June 2008, Guerrón joined Getafe for a contract of four years at a price of €4 million. He made his league debut on 31 August 2008 against Sporting de Gijón, being taunted in that game by fans of Sporting de Gijón. Several parts of the stadium could be heard making monkey noises and other degrading taunts against him. As a result, Swiss club teammate Fabio Celestini condemned the racist supporters in a later press conference calling them idiots and also praising Guerrón's attitude throughout the match, although it was suggested that Joffre did not know the insults were directed at him. Gijón was fined a modest sum for the incident.

=== Cruzeiro ===
Guerrón signed for Cruzeiro on loan from Getafe for one season. Cruzeiro paid around €1 million and could sign him on a permanent basis at the end of the season for €3 million. In his 2009 season, he played 15 league games, scoring two goals in two victories against Santo Andre and Sport Recife. On 4 February, in a 2010 Copa Libertadores match, he scored a goal in 7–0 win against Bolivian club Real Potosi. For the 2010 season, he played in only four league matches, scoring only once against Guarani in a 2–2 draw.

=== Atlético Paranaense ===
In July 2010, Guerrón joined the Brazilian club Atlético Paranaense for a transfer fee of €907,000. After playing for Paranaense for two seasons, he became the team's top goalscorer.

=== Beijing Guoan ===
Guerrón moved to Beijing Guoan in 2012. He scored his first league goal on 20 October, in a 2–0 away win against Qingdao Jonoon. He ended his season with 13 games played, and 2 goals scored.

On his league debut for the 2013 Chinese Super League, he scored in a 4–1 home win against Shanghai East Asia F.C. On 5 April, Guerrón scored the only goal in an away win against Jiangsu Sainty. On 23 April, in an AFC Champions League group match against Korean giants Pohang Steelers, Guerron scored the opening goal in a 2–0 home win. On 1 June, Guerrón scored a chipped goal in a 4–0 home win over Liaoning Whowin. On 22 June, he scored in a 2–1 away loss to Hangzhou. A week later on 26 June, Guerrón scored in a 3–0 home win over Shandong Luneng. On 7 July, he scored his sixth goal of the season against Shanghai SIPG, in a 3–0 away win. Then a week later on 14 July, Guerrón scored another goal in a 3–1 home win against Wuhan Zall. On 25 August he scored in a 4–0 home win over Dalian Aerbin. On 5 October, Guerrón scored in a 1–1 away draw against Liaoning Whowin. On 18 October, Guerron scored in a 1–1 home draw against Hangzhou.

=== Tigres UANL ===
On 13 July 2014, Guerrón joined Liga MX side Tigres UANL. On 26 July, he made his official debut with Tigres, coming on as a 63rd-minute substitute for Édgar Lugo on the 4–2 victory of Tigres over Club León at the Estadio Universitario in the second match of the team in the Apertura 2014 tournament. He scored his first goal via penalty-kick in an Apertura 2014 Copa MX game against Estudiantes de Altamira in the victory of 4–0 at the Estadio Universitario on 29 July. On 16 August, Guerrón scored his first goal in a League game, on the 1–1 draw against Puebla FC, at the Estadio Cuauhtémoc. On 27 September, he scored the second goal for the 3–2 victory against C.F. Pachuca at the Estadio Hidalgo, with a powerful shot from outside the penalty area. On 25 October, he scored a goal in the Clásico Regiomontano against C.F. Monterrey, for a 2–2 draw at the Estadio Tecnológico. On 22 November, he scored the first goal of the 2–1 victory against Club Toluca at the Estadio Universitario. In the "liguilla" (play-offs), he scored the goal of the 1–1 draw against Pachuca in the away game at the Estadio Hidalgo on 26 November. In the home game of the finals against Club América on 11 December 2014, Guerrón scored the goal of the 1–0 victory. On 7 February 2015, he scored the goal of the 1–0 home win over Puebla FC. He scored one goal in the 3–0 home victory against Pumas UNAM on 28 February. On 14 March, Guerrón scored the second goal of the 2–1 home victory against Pachuca FC. On 4 April, he scored the third goal of the 3–1 home victory over Tiburones Rojos de Veracruz. He scored the second goal for the 3–1 victory over Querétaro FC at the Estadio Corregidora on 24 April. On 13 May, he scored the goal of the 1–1 against Santos Laguna in the quarterfinals of the play-offs. Tigres became champion of the Apertura 2015 season, but Guerrón, playing as the substitute of Jürgen Damm, scored only two goals in the season and played only one game of playoffs.

==== Copa Libertadores 2015 ====
Finishing as second place of the Apertura 2014 tournament, Tigres got a ticket to play in the Copa Libertadores 2015 as "Mexico 1". On 18 February 2015, he scored two goals of the 3–0 victory against Juan Aurich at the Estadio Universitario. He scored the 1-1 goal against River Plate on 5 March, at El Monumental. On 17 March, he scored a goal against Club Deportivo San José in the 4–0 home victory. Tigres lost the finals against River Plate and Guerrón was named the MVP of the Cup.

=== Cruz Azul ===
On 15 December 2015, Guerrón joined Liga MX side Cruz Azul for two years.

=== Pumas UNAM ===
On 7 June 2017, Club Universidad Nacional confirmed the signing of "Dinamita" Guerrón.

== International career ==
Guerrón has represented Ecuador on a youth level, even scoring against Panama's U-20 team in a friendly match. Once the 2007 tournament began, despite an inconsistent campaign, Joffre Guerrón, under the direction of Edgardo Bauza, managed to establish himself as an essential part of the Liga de Quito squad. His performance led him to be considered by the Ecuadorian national team, including a preliminary squad for the 2007 Copa América, although he ultimately did not make the tournament. His international participation began under Luis Fernando Suárez in friendlies against El Salvador and Bolivia. He subsequently appeared in the first matches of the qualifiers for South Africa 2010, in the double defeats against Venezuela and Brazil.

In 2008, now under Sixto Vizuete, Guerrón was regularly called up during the qualifiers, driven by his outstanding performance in the Copa Libertadores. However, his on-field performance was inconsistent, leading to criticism from the press and fans. He was present in the friendly against Mexico and, in the restart of qualifying in 2009, he participated in the matches against Brazil, Paraguay, Peru, and Argentina, again facing questions about his level. His uncertain time with Getafe and Cruzeiro led to his exclusion from the final qualifying matches.

After the national team's failure to qualify for the 2010 World Cup in South Africa, the national team faced a series of friendlies in 2010. Due to his poor performances with Cruzeiro and Atlético Paranaense, Guerrón only participated in the matches against Colombia and Poland. This situation left him out of the previous friendlies coached by Reinaldo Rueda, as well as the 2011 Copa América. That same year, he was included in the squad for the 2014 Brazil qualifiers against Venezuela and Peru, although he barely played the final minutes. His subsequent spells with Atlético Paranaense and Beijing Guoan resulted in his absence from both friendlies and qualifying matches in 2012. He returned to the national team in the final rounds, playing against Colombia and Bolivia, where he again only appeared in the final stages.

His time with the national team generated growing tension with the coaching staff and sports journalists. Guerrón claimed that his poor performance was a consequence of an institutional "gang" formed by the president of the federation, Luis Chiriboga, some teammates, and the coach's distrust, which conditioned his permanence with the team. For their part, the management and coaching staff pointed out that he did not show a genuine commitment to the national team, criticizing his physical condition and describing his behavior as unsportsmanlike. The conflict reached new heights when he was not called up for the 2014 World Cup in Brazil, the preparation friendlies, the 2015 Copa América, the qualifiers for Russia 2018, and the Copa América Centenario.

Guerrón responded with new accusations against the federation, coaches Sixto Vizuete and Gustavo Quinteros, as well as his teammates, claiming they were unaware of his career at Liga de Quito and Tigres, and accusing them of spreading defamation against him. The coaching staff reiterated that his presence was detrimental to the dressing room atmosphere. Ultimately, after spells with Tigres, Cruz Azul, and Pumas, he was no longer part of the national team.

== Personal life ==
He is a brother of Raúl Guerrón who participated for Ecuador in the 2002 FIFA World Cup. He is married and has one son. Guerrón is admired by his fans for his humility and love to Latin music, he has been seen in humble sectors of several cities singing and dancing with fans.

== Career statistics ==
=== Club ===
Appearances and goals by club, season and competition
Club	Season	League			State League		Cup		Continental		Total	
Club	Season	Division	Apps	Goals	Apps	Goals	Apps	Goals	Apps	Goals	Apps	Goals
Aucas	2002	Ecuadorian Serie A	18	3	—		—		—		18	3
Aucas	2003	Ecuadorian Serie A	17	0	—		—		—		17	0
Aucas	2004	Ecuadorian Serie A	24	5	—		—		2	0	26	5
Aucas	Total		59	8	—		—		2	0	61	8
LDU Quito	2006	Ecuadorian Serie A	15	0	—		—		5	1	20	1
LDU Quito	2007	Ecuadorian Serie A	39	7	—		—		8	3	47	10
LDU Quito	2008	Ecuadorian Serie A	13	1	—		—		13	3	26	4
LDU Quito	Total		67	8	—		—		26	7	93	15
Getafe	2008–09	La Liga	14	1	—		—		—		14	1
Cruzeiro	2009	Série A	15	2	—		—		—		15	2
Cruzeiro	2010	Série A	4	1	6	0	—		3	1	13	2
Cruzeiro	Total		19	3	6	0	—		3	1	28	4
Atlético Paranaense	2010	Série A	20	2	—		—		—		20	2
Atlético Paranaense	2011	Série A	22	5	17	5	7	3	1	0	47	13
Atlético Paranaense	2012	Série B	—		8	5	7	7	—		15	12
Atlético Paranaense	Total		42	7	25	10	14	10	1	0	82	27
Beijing Guoan	2012	Chinese Super League	12	1	—		2	2	0	0	14	3
Beijing Guoan	2013	Chinese Super League	25	11	—		3	3	7	1	35	15
Beijing Guoan	2014	Chinese Super League	9	2	—		0	0	5	3	14	5
Beijing Guoan	Total		46	14	—		5	5	12	4	63	23
Tigres UANL	2014–15	Liga MX	37	11	—		5	1	9	4	51	16
Tigres UANL	2015–16	Liga MX	13	2	—		0	0	3	0	16	2
Tigres UANL	Total		50	13	—		5	1	12	4	67	18
Cruz Azul	2015–16	Liga MX	15	1	—		6	7	—		21	8
Cruz Azul	2016–17	Liga MX	9	0	—		3	3	—		12	3
Cruz Azul	Total		24	1	—		9	10	—		33	11
Pumas UNAM	2017–18	Liga MX	10	0	—		3	1	—		13	1
Barcelona S.C.	2018	Ecuadorian Serie A	6	0	—		—		—		6	0
Career total			337	55	31	10	36	27	56	16	460	108

=== International ===
Appearances and goals by national team and year
National team	Year	Apps	Goals
Ecuador	2007	4	0
Ecuador	2008	7	0
Ecuador	2009	4	0
Ecuador	2010	2	0
Ecuador	2011	0	0
Ecuador	2013	1	0
Total		18	0

== Honours ==
LDU Quito

- Serie A: 2007
- Copa Libertadores: 2008

Tigres UANL

- Liga MX: Apertura 2015

Individual

- Copa Libertadores Best Player: 2008, 2015
- Copa MX top scorer: Clausura 2016 Copa MX
