= 2002 FIFA World Cup Group G =

Football tournament group stage

Group G of the 2002 FIFA World Cup took place on 13 June 2002. Mexico won the group, and advanced to the second round, along with Italy. Croatia and Ecuador failed to advance.

== Standings ==
Pos	Team	Pld	W	D	L	GF	GA	GD	Pts	Qualification
1	Mexico	3	2	1	0	4	2	+2	7	Advance to knockout stage
2	Italy	3	1	1	1	4	3	+1	4	Advance to knockout stage
3	Croatia	3	1	0	2	2	3	−1	3	
4	Ecuador	3	1	0	2	2	4	−2	3	

Source: FIFA
Rules for classification: Tie-breaking criteria
- Mexico advanced to play United States (runner-up of Group D) in the round of 16.
- Italy advanced to play South Korea (winner of Group D) in the round of 16.

== Matches ==
All times local (UTC+9)

=== Croatia vs Mexico ===
3 June 2002
15:30

Croatia	0–1	Mexico
		Blanco 60' (pen.)

Niigata Big Swan Stadium, Niigata
Attendance: 32,239
Referee: Lu Jun (China)

Croatia	Mexico

GK	1	Stipe Pletikosa
CB	6	Boris Živković	(red card) 59'
CB	3	Josip Šimunić
CB	21	Robert Kovač
RM	10	Niko Kovač
CM	14	Zvonimir Soldo
CM	4	Stjepan Tomas
LM	17	Robert Jarni
AM	8	Robert Prosinečki		(substituted off) 46'
CF	9	Davor Šuker (c)		(substituted off) 64'
CF	11	Alen Bokšić		(substituted off) 67'
Substitutions:
MF	5	Milan Rapaić		(substituted on) 46'
DF	15	Daniel Šarić		(substituted on) 64'
MF	13	Mario Stanić		(substituted on) 67'
Manager:
Mirko Jozić

GK	1	Óscar Pérez
RB	16	Salvador Carmona
CB	4	Rafael Márquez (c)
CB	5	Manuel Vidrio
LB	11	Braulio Luna
RM	19	Gabriel Caballero
CM	6	Gerardo Torrado
CM	13	Sigifredo Mercado
LM	7	Ramón Morales
SS	10	Cuauhtémoc Blanco	(substituted off) 79'
CF	9	Jared Borgetti	(substituted off) 68'
Substitutions:
FW	15	Luis Hernández	(substituted on) 68'
FW	17	Francisco Palencia	(substituted on) 79'
Manager:
Javier Aguirre

Man of the Match:
Braulio Luna (Mexico)

Assistant referees:
Komaleeswaran Sankar (India)
Taoufik Adjengui (Tunisia)
Fourth official:
Falla N'Doye (Senegal)

=== Italy vs Ecuador ===
3 June 2002
20:30

Italy	2–0	Ecuador
Vieri 7', 27'

Sapporo Dome, Sapporo
Attendance: 31,081
Referee: Brian Hall (United States)

Italy	Ecuador

GK	1	Gianluigi Buffon
RB	19	Gianluca Zambrotta
CB	13	Alessandro Nesta
CB	3	Paolo Maldini (c)
CB	5	Fabio Cannavaro	(yellow card) 81'
LB	2	Christian Panucci
RM	17	Damiano Tommasi
CM	14	Luigi Di Biagio		(substituted off) 69'
LM	11	Cristiano Doni		(substituted off) 64'
SS	10	Francesco Totti		(substituted off) 74'
CF	21	Christian Vieri
Substitutions:
MF	16	Angelo Di Livio		(substituted on) 64'
MF	8	Gennaro Gattuso		(substituted on) 69'
FW	7	Alessandro Del Piero		(substituted on) 74'
Manager:
Giovanni Trapattoni

GK	1	José Cevallos
RB	4	Ulises de la Cruz	(yellow card) 49'
CB	3	Iván Hurtado
CB	2	Augusto Poroso	(yellow card) 14'
LB	6	Raúl Guerrón
RM	19	Édison Méndez
CM	20	Edwin Tenorio		(substituted off) 59'
CM	5	Alfonso Obregón
LM	16	Cléver Chalá	(yellow card) 54'	(substituted off) 85'
AM	10	Álex Aguinaga (c)		(substituted off) 46'
CF	11	Agustín Delgado
Substitutions:
FW	18	Carlos Tenorio		(substituted on) 46'
DF	15	Marlon Ayoví		(substituted on) 59'
MF	7	Nicolás Asencio		(substituted on) 85'
Manager:
(Colombia) Hernán Gómez

Man of the Match:
Christian Vieri (Italy)

Assistant referees:
Héctor Vergara (Canada)
Philip Sharp (England)
Fourth official:
Terje Hauge (Norway)

=== Italy vs Croatia ===
8 June 2002
18:00

Italy	1–2	Croatia
Vieri 55'		Olić 73'; Rapaić 76'

Kashima Soccer Stadium, Ibaraki
Attendance: 36,472
Referee: Graham Poll (England)

Italy	Croatia

GK	1	Gianluigi Buffon
RB	19	Gianluca Zambrotta
CB	13	Alessandro Nesta		(substituted off) 24'
CB	3	Paolo Maldini (c)
CB	5	Fabio Cannavaro
LB	2	Christian Panucci
RM	17	Damiano Tommasi
CM	6	Cristiano Zanetti
LM	11	Cristiano Doni		(substituted off) 79'
SS	10	Francesco Totti
CF	21	Christian Vieri	(yellow card) 51'
Substitutions:
CB	23	Marco Materazzi		(substituted on) 24'
FW	9	Filippo Inzaghi		(substituted on) 79'
Manager:
Giovanni Trapattoni

GK	1	Stipe Pletikosa
SW	21	Robert Kovač	(yellow card) 39'
CB	3	Josip Šimunić
CB	4	Stjepan Tomas
RWB	15	Daniel Šarić
LWB	17	Robert Jarni (c)
CM	14	Zvonimir Soldo		(substituted off) 62'
CM	10	Niko Kovač
AM	7	Davor Vugrinec		(substituted off) 57'
AM	5	Milan Rapaić		(substituted off) 79'
CF	11	Alen Bokšić
Substitutions:
FW	18	Ivica Olić		(substituted on) 57'
MF	16	Jurica Vranješ		(substituted on) 62'
DF	20	Dario Šimić		(substituted on) 79'
Manager:
Mirko Jozić

Man of the Match:
Milan Rapaić (Croatia)

Assistant referees:
Philip Sharp (England)
Jens Larsen (Denmark)
Fourth official:
William Mattus (Costa Rica)

=== Mexico vs Ecuador ===
9 June 2002
15:30

Mexico	2–1	Ecuador
Borgetti 28'; Torrado 57'		Delgado 5'

Miyagi Stadium, Miyagi
Attendance: 45,610
Referee: Mourad Daami (Tunisia)

Mexico	Ecuador

GK	1	Óscar Pérez
RB	16	Salvador Carmona
CB	5	Manuel Vidrio
CB	4	Rafael Márquez (c)
LB	11	Braulio Luna
RM	21	Jesús Arellano
CM	6	Gerardo Torrado	(yellow card) 65'
CM	18	Johan Rodríguez		(substituted off) 87'
LM	7	Ramón Morales
SS	10	Cuauhtémoc Blanco		(substituted off) 90+3'
CF	9	Jared Borgetti		(substituted off) 77'
Substitutions:
FW	15	Luis Hernández		(substituted on) 77'
MF	19	Gabriel Caballero		(substituted on) 87'
MF	13	Sigifredo Mercado		(substituted on) 90+3'
Manager:
Javier Aguirre

GK	1	José Cevallos	(yellow card) 27'
RB	4	Ulises de la Cruz
CB	3	Iván Hurtado (c)
CB	2	Augusto Poroso
LB	6	Raúl Guerrón	(yellow card) 49'
RM	19	Édison Méndez
CM	5	Alfonso Obregón		(substituted off) 58'
CM	20	Edwin Tenorio		(substituted off) 35'
LM	16	Cléver Chalá
CF	9	Iván Kaviedes	(yellow card) 15'	(substituted off) 53'
CF	11	Agustín Delgado	(yellow card) 87'
Substitutions:
DF	15	Marlon Ayoví		(substituted on) 35'
FW	18	Carlos Tenorio	(yellow card) 61'	(substituted on) 53'
MF	10	Álex Aguinaga		(substituted on) 58'
Manager:
(Colombia) Hernán Gómez

Man of the Match:
Gerardo Torrado (Mexico)

Assistant referees:
Taoufik Adjengui (Tunisia)
Haidar Koleit (Lebanon)
Fourth official:
Kim Milton Nielsen (Denmark)

=== Mexico vs Italy ===
13 June 2002
20:30

Mexico	1–1	Italy
Borgetti 34'		Del Piero 85'

Ōita Big Eye Stadium, Ōita
Attendance: 39,291
Referee: Carlos Simon (Brazil)

Mexico	Italy

GK	1	Óscar Pérez	(yellow card) 84'
RB	16	Salvador Carmona
CB	5	Manuel Vidrio
CB	4	Rafael Márquez (c)
LB	11	Braulio Luna
RM	21	Jesús Arellano	(yellow card) 2'
CM	6	Gerardo Torrado
CM	18	Johan Rodríguez		(substituted off) 76'
LM	7	Ramón Morales		(substituted off) 76'
SS	10	Cuauhtémoc Blanco
CF	9	Jared Borgetti		(substituted off) 80'
Substitutions:
MF	3	Rafael García		(substituted on) 76'
MF	19	Gabriel Caballero		(substituted on) 76'
FW	17	Francisco Palencia		(substituted on) 80'
Manager:
Javier Aguirre

GK	1	Gianluigi Buffon
RB	19	Gianluca Zambrotta	(yellow card) 55'
CB	5	Fabio Cannavaro	(yellow card) 5'
CB	3	Paolo Maldini (c)
CB	13	Alessandro Nesta
LB	2	Christian Panucci	(yellow card) 10'	(substituted off) 63'
RM	17	Damiano Tommasi
CM	6	Cristiano Zanetti
LM	10	Francesco Totti	(yellow card) 43'	(substituted off) 78'
RF	21	Christian Vieri
LF	9	Filippo Inzaghi		(substituted off) 55'
Substitutions:
FW	20	Vincenzo Montella	(yellow card) 57'	(substituted on) 55'
LB	4	Francesco Coco		(substituted on) 63'
FW	7	Alessandro Del Piero		(substituted on) 78'
Manager:
Giovanni Trapattoni

Man of the Match:
Cuauhtémoc Blanco (Mexico)

Assistant referees:
Jorge Oliveira (Brazil)
Mat Lazim Awang Hamat (Malaysia)
Fourth official:
Terje Hauge (Norway)

=== Ecuador vs Croatia ===
13 June 2002
20:30

Ecuador	1–0	Croatia
Méndez 48'

International Stadium Yokohama, Yokohama
Attendance: 65,862
Referee: William Mattus (Costa Rica)

Ecuador	Croatia

GK	1	José Cevallos
RB	4	Ulises de la Cruz
CB	3	Iván Hurtado (c)
CB	2	Augusto Poroso
LB	6	Raúl Guerrón
RM	19	Édison Méndez
CM	5	Alfonso Obregon		(substituted off) 40'
CM	15	Marlon Ayoví
LM	16	Cléver Chalá	(yellow card) 86'
CF	18	Carlos Tenorio		(substituted off) 76'
CF	11	Agustín Delgado
Substitutions:
MF	10	Álex Aguinaga		(substituted on) 40'
FW	9	Iván Kaviedes		(substituted on) 76'
Manager:
(Colombia) Hernán Gómez

GK	1	Stipe Pletikosa
SW	21	Robert Kovač
CB	3	Josip Šimunić	(yellow card) 90+2'
CB	20	Dario Šimić		(substituted off) 52'
RWB	15	Daniel Šarić		(substituted off) 68'
LWB	17	Robert Jarni (c)
CM	4	Stjepan Tomas	(yellow card) 72'
CM	10	Niko Kovač		(substituted off) 59'
CM	5	Milan Rapaić
CF	18	Ivica Olić
CF	11	Alen Bokšić
Substitutions:
FW	7	Davor Vugrinec		(substituted on) 52'
MF	16	Jurica Vranješ		(substituted on) 59'
MF	13	Mario Stanić		(substituted on) 68'
Manager:
Mirko Jozić

Man of the Match:
Édison Méndez (Ecuador)

Assistant referees:
Miguel Giacomuzzi (Paraguay)
Roland Van Nylen (Belgium)
Fourth official:
Mark Shield (Australia)

== See also ==
- Croatia at the FIFA World Cup
- Ecuador at the FIFA World Cup
- Italy at the FIFA World Cup
- Mexico at the FIFA World Cup
