= Croatia at the FIFA World Cup =

International football delegation

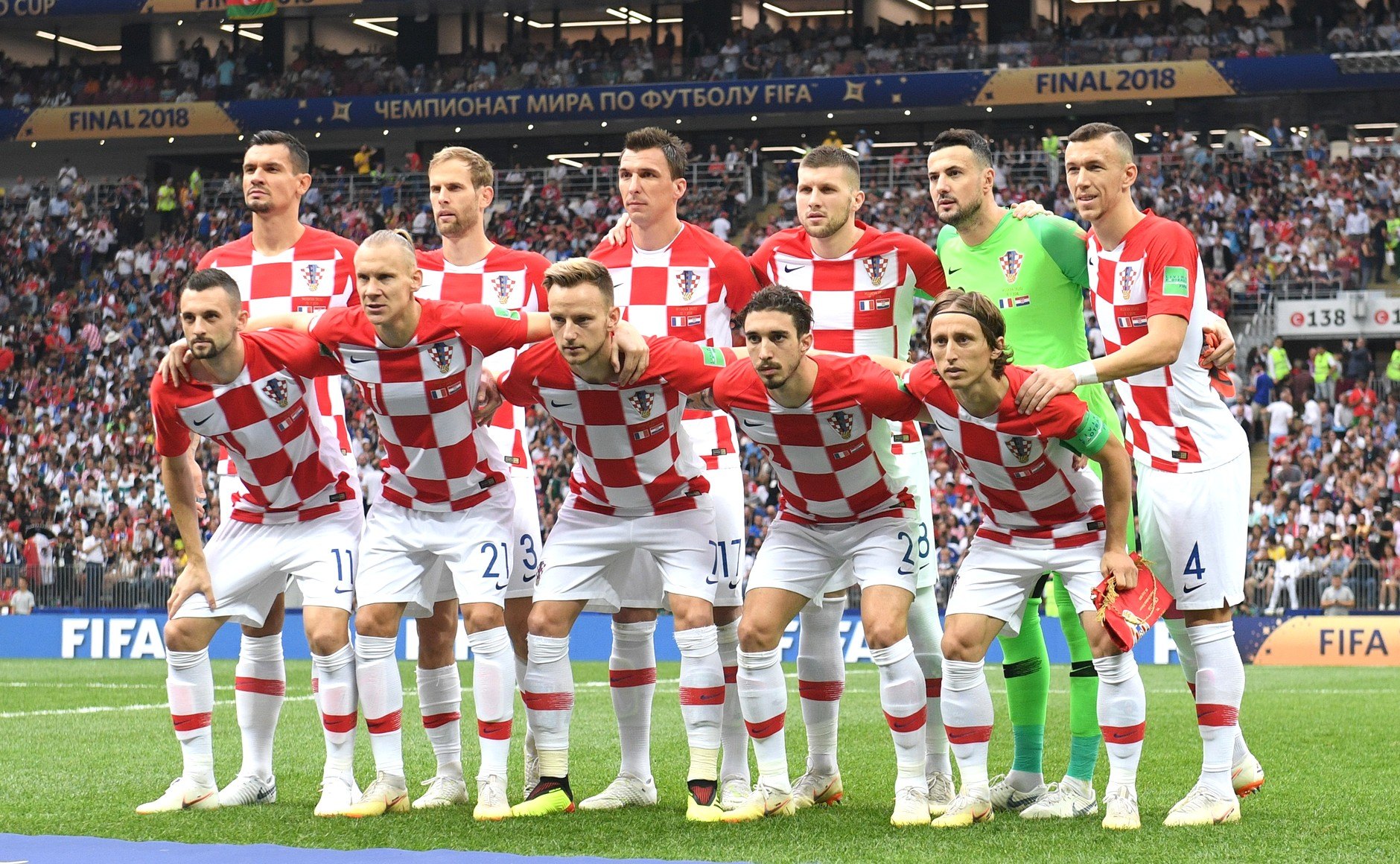
The Croatia starting lineup before the 2018 FIFA World Cup final against France.

The national team of Croatia has competed in the FIFA World Cup seven times, finishing on the podium on three occasions. Since gaining independence in 1991, Croatia has qualified for every edition of the tournament, with the exception of 2010. Croatia's best result since gaining admission into FIFA in 1992 was a runner-up finish in 2018, where they lost the final 4–2 to France.

The national side has collected three World Cup medals: two bronze (1998 and 2022) and one silver (2018). Due to its small geography and populace, Croatia is often one of the smallest countries competing in the tournament. They are the second-smallest country by population (after Uruguay) and land mass (after the Netherlands) to reach a World Cup final.

== Overview ==
Year	Round	Position	Pld	W	D	L	GF	GA
(France) 1998	Third place	3rd	7	5	0	2	11	5
(South Korea) (Japan) 2002	Group stage	23rd	3	1	0	2	2	3
(Germany) 2006	Group stage	22nd	3	0	2	1	2	3
(South Africa) 2010	Did not qualify							
(Brazil) 2014	Group stage	19th	3	1	0	2	6	6
(Russia) 2018	Runners-up	2nd	7	4	2	1	14	9
(Qatar) 2022	Third place	3rd	7	2	4	1	8	7
(Canada) (Mexico) (United States) 2026	Round of 32	20th	4	2	0	2	6	7
(Morocco) (Portugal) (Spain) 2030	To be determined							
(Saudi Arabia) 2034	To be determined							
Total			34	15	8	11	49	40

Croatia's World Cup record
First match	Jamaica 1–3 Croatia (14 June 1998; Lens, France)
Biggest win	Cameroon 0–4 Croatia (18 June 2014; Manaus, Brazil)
Biggest defeat	Argentina 3–0 Croatia (13 December 2022; Lusail, Qatar)
Best result	Runners-up in 2018
Worst result	Group stage in 2002, 2006 and 2014

== Croatia in France 1998 ==
In the draw for the final tournament, held on 4 December 1997 at Stade Vélodrome in Marseille, Croatia was drawn to play in Group H, along with two-time World Cup winners Argentina in addition to fellow debutants Jamaica and Japan. In their first match Croatia beat Jamaica 3–1, in a game memorable for Croatia's first ever World Cup goal, an opener scored by Mario Stanić in the 27th minute. Croatia went on to beat Japan 1–0 before losing their third group stage match against Argentina 0–1, in a game which was of little importance as both teams had already qualified for the round of 16.

In round of 16, Croatia faced Group G winners Romania (who had finished top of their group in front of England) and won the game through a penalty converted by Davor Šuker in stoppage time of the first half after a foul on Aljoša Asanović by Gabriel Popescu. After that Croatia faced Germany in the quarter-finals, in a game which was at the time touted by the Croatian media as a great opportunity to get back at Germany as it was them who had knocked out Croatia in the UEFA Euro 1996 quarter-finals two years earlier. In the 40th minute Christian Wörns received a direct red card and was sent off for fouling Davor Šuker, and Robert Jarni opened the scoring eight minutes later in stoppage time of the first half. Goran Vlaović and Davor Šuker added a second and third and the game ended in a 3–0 win, which is still regarded by fans and the media as one of the most memorable matches Croatia ever played.

Croatia went on to face hosts France in the semi-finals, but lost the game 1–2 when an opener scored by Šuker in the 46th minute was immediately equalised by Lilian Thuram the following minute. Thuram also scored France's second goal in the 69th minute. These were the only two goals Thuram ever scored for France in an international career spanning from 1994 to 2008 which saw him earn a total of 147 caps. After Croatia's exit manager Blažević was heavily criticized by Croatian press for not sending in Robert Prosinečki soon enough after France took the lead (Prosinečki came on as a substitute for Mario Stanić just minutes before the final whistle). Croatia captain Zvonimir Boban tried to take the blame for the defeat saying that he felt he needed to be substituted but wanted to stay on the pitch just a little while longer (it was his defending mistake which led to Thuram's equaliser).

After being knocked out in the semi-finals, Croatia looked for consolation against Netherlands in the match for third place played just three days later at Parc des Princes. Croatia went on to win 2–1 through goals by Šuker and Prosinečki, but after the final whistle Dražen Ladić was labelled player of the match, for a career-best performance which saw him save numerous shots from Patrick Kluivert, Clarence Seedorf and Marc Overmars.

=== Squad ===

Croatia's 3-5-2 lineup in the 1998 World Cup

Manager Miroslav Blažević included the following 22 players in the finals tournament squad. The 16 players who were capped at least once in one of the seven matches Croatia played in France are highlighted in bold. The remaining six players were unused at the tournament (defenders Goran Jurić and Anthony Šerić, defensive midfielder Mamić, striker Ardian Kozniku, and second and third-choice goalkeepers Marijan Mrmić and Vladimir Vasilj). On the other hand, six players appeared in all seven matches: goalkeeper Dražen Ladić, defender Slaven Bilić, midfielders Aljoša Asanović, Mario Stanić, Robert Jarni, and striker Davor Šuker.

Out of 11 goals scored by Croatia at the tournament, six were scored by Davor Šuker, who was awarded the Golden Shoe Award for the top goalscorer of the tournament, as well as the Silver Ball Award as the second most outstanding player of the tournament (behind Ronaldo of Brazil). Robert Prosinečki (who was retroactively given the 1990 FIFA World Cup Best Young Player Award, where he had appeared for Yugoslavia), also scored two goals in matches against Jamaica and the Netherlands, which made him the only player in World Cup history to score goals at finals tournaments for two different countries.

For three players (Jarni, Prosinečki and Šuker) this was their second appearance at the World Cup, having been members of Yugoslavia squad at the 1990 FIFA World Cup. Alen Bokšić would have been fourth, having been a key player in Croatia's qualifying campaign, but he was dropped from the tournament squad after sustaining an injury just months before the tournament in France.

- **Aljoša Asanović**
- **Slaven Bilić**
- **Zvonimir Boban** (c)
- **Robert Jarni**
- **Krunoslav Jurčić**
- Goran Jurić
- Ardian Kozniku
- **Petar Krpan**
- **Dražen Ladić**
- Zoran Mamić
- **Silvio Marić**
- Marijan Mrmić
- **Robert Prosinečki**
- **Zvonimir Soldo**
- **Mario Stanić**
- Anthony Šerić
- **Dario Šimić**
- **Igor Štimac**
- **Davor Šuker**
- **Igor Tudor**
- Vladimir Vasilj
- **Goran Vlaović**
Head coach: Miroslav Blažević

=== Group stage ===
Pos	Team	Pld	W	D	L	GF	GA	GD	Pts	Qualification
1	Argentina	3	3	0	0	7	0	+7	**9**	**Advance to knockout stage**
**2**	Croatia	**3**	**2**	**0**	**1**	**4**	**2**	**+2**	**6**	**Advance to knockout stage**
3	Jamaica	3	1	0	2	3	9	−6	**3**	
4	Japan	3	0	0	3	1	4	−3	**0**	

Source: FIFA
14 June 1998
21:00

Jamaica	1–3	Croatia
Earle 45'	Report	Stanić 27'; Prosinečki 53'; Šuker 69'

Stade Félix-Bollaert, Lens
Attendance: 38,100
Referee: Vítor Melo Pereira (Portugal)

20 June 1998
14:30

Japan	0–1	Croatia
	Report	Šuker 77'

Stade de la Beaujoire, Nantes
Attendance: 35,500
Referee: Ramesh Ramdhan (Trinidad and Tobago)

26 June 1998
16:00

Argentina	1–0	Croatia
Pineda 36'	Report

Parc Lescure, Bordeaux
Attendance: 31,800
Referee: Said Belqola (Morocco)

=== Knockout stage ===
Round of 16

30 June 1998
16:30

Romania	0–1	Croatia
	Report	Šuker 45+2' (pen.)

Parc Lescure, Bordeaux
Attendance: 31,800
Referee: Javier Castrilli (Argentina)

Quarter-finals

4 July 1998
21:00

Germany	0–3	Croatia
	Report	Jarni 45+3'; Vlaović 80'; Šuker 85'

Stade de Gerland, Lyon
Attendance: 39,100
Referee: Rune Pedersen (Norway)

Semi-finals

8 July 1998
21:00

France	2–1	Croatia
Thuram 47', 70'	Report	Šuker 46'

Stade de France, Saint-Denis
Attendance: 76,000
Referee: José María García-Aranda (Spain)

Match for third place

11 July 1998
21:00

Netherlands	1–2	Croatia
Zenden 22'	Report	Prosinečki 14'; Šuker 36'

Parc des Princes, Paris
Attendance: 45,500
Referee: Epifanio González (Paraguay)

=== Legacy ===
By beating Netherlands, Croatia finished third in their World Cup debut, a feat matched only by Eusébio's Portugal in the 1966 World Cup 32 years earlier. Consequently, Croatia reached their highest ever FIFA ranking when they were third in the world for three months between January and March 1999 and were given the Best Mover of the Year Award in 1998, the only team so far which won the award twice (having been Best Movers in 1994). Upon returning to Croatia, the whole squad was decorated by President Franjo Tuđman, and were nicknamed "Brončani" ("The Bronze Ones") and "Vatreni'" ("The Fiery Ones") in the media. The latter stuck as a permanent nickname for the national team.

Most players continued playing for the team throughout the UEFA Euro 2000 qualifiers, but after Croatia failed to qualify manager Miroslav Blažević resigned and soon after that some of the players retired from the national team. The next manager Mirko Jozić kept some of the remaining members of the Bronze Generation and even took them to 2002 FIFA World Cup (such as Šuker, Prosinečki, Jarni, Stanić, Soldo, Vlaović, Šimić), but they failed to make an impact at the tournament and almost all of them retired soon afterwards, but a number of them later became prominent figures in Croatian football.

Zvonimir Boban went into sports publishing and took over as CEO of Croatia's sports daily Sportske novosti in 2005 and worked as a commentator for Italian television stations. Šuker launched his line of sports apparel and established a football academy carrying his name. Zvonimir Soldo, Robert Jarni, Slaven Bilić, Igor Štimac and Dražen Ladić all took up managing jobs (Soldo coached Dinamo Zagreb to a Double in 2008, while Jarni, Bilić and Štimac all had managerial spells at Hajduk Split). Štimac later became chairman of the association of Prva HNL clubs, the body regulating top flight football in Croatia, and Bilić took over as Croatia manager in 2006, hiring Aljoša Asanović, Robert Prosinečki and Marijan Mrmić as his assistants. Dražen Ladić took up managing the Croatia under-21 team in 2006, and Krunoslav Jurčić is the current manager at the Egyptian side Pyramid FC which he led to the CAF Champions League title in 2025. Miroslav Blažević later managed a number of clubs in Croatia, Slovenia and Switzerland before taking over as Bosnia and Herzegovina manager in 2008 and sensationally leading them to the verge of qualifying for the 2010 World Cup.

== Croatia in South Korea/Japan 2002 ==
Croatia qualified for their second world cup after navigating Group 6 of UEFA's World Cup qualifications without a loss, finishing first and directly qualifying ahead of Belgium, Scotland, Latvia and San Marino. Croatia qualification led by manager Miroslav Blažević, but after tying the initial two matches, he was replaced by Mirko Jozić, who would manage the team during the World Cup.

Croatia started their World Cup campaign by losing 1–0 to Mexico. They defeated Italy 2–1 after two Italian goals were incorrectly disallowed. Croatia needed a two-goal victory over debutants Ecuador to confirm qualification for the knockout stages but would be eliminated if they lost by two goals (regardless of the concurrent Italy vs Mexico match), but also could qualify with a one-goal victory if Italy didn't defeat Mexico, and could also qualify with a draw if Italy lost to Mexico. Ecuador had taken a shock 1–0 lead over Croatia, who could not break down the Ecuadorian defense, and only solid goalkeeping from Stipe Pletikosa prevented the South Americans from winning by a greater scoreline. A late Italy goal to make the scoreline 1–1 in their match vs Mexico meant a draw would not send Croatia through, requiring two goals in three minutes to advance, but the Vatreni did not score and exited the competition at the group stage for the first time.

=== Squad ===

Croatia's 3–4–1-2 lineup at the 2002 World Cup
- Boško Balaban
- Alen Bokšić
- Tomislav Butina
- Robert Jarni (c)
- Niko Kovač
- Robert Kovač
- Ivica Olić
- Stipe Pletikosa
- Robert Prosinečki
- Milan Rapaić
- Zvonimir Soldo
- Mario Stanić
- Daniel Šarić
- Anthony Šerić
- Dario Šimić
- Josip Šimunić
- Davor Šuker
- Stjepan Tomas
- Vladimir Vasilj
- Goran Vlaović
- Jurica Vranješ
- Davor Vugrinec
- Boris Živković
Head coach: Mirko Jozić

=== Group stage ===
Pos	Team	Pld	W	D	L	GF	GA	GD	Pts	Qualification
1	Mexico	3	2	1	0	4	2	+2	7	Advance to knockout stage
2	Italy	3	1	1	1	4	3	+1	4	Advance to knockout stage
3	Croatia	3	1	0	2	2	3	−1	3	
4	Ecuador	3	1	0	2	2	4	−2	3	

Source: FIFA
Rules for classification: Tie-breaking criteria
3 June 2002
15:30

Croatia	0–1	Mexico
	Report	Blanco 60' (pen.)

Niigata Big Swan Stadium, Niigata
Attendance: 32,239
Referee: Lu Jun (China)

8 June 2002
18:00

Italy	1–2	Croatia
Vieri 55'	Report	Olić 73'; Rapaić 76'

Kashima Soccer Stadium, Ibaraki
Attendance: 36,472
Referee: Graham Poll (England)

13 June 2002
20:30

Ecuador	1–0	Croatia
Méndez 48'	Report

International Stadium Yokohama, Yokohama
Attendance: 65,862
Referee: William Mattus (Costa Rica)

== Croatia in Germany 2006 ==
Croatia qualified automatically for the World Cup after topping their qualification group without losing a game, ahead of Sweden, who tied on points and had a better goal difference but who Croatia had defeated twice. Future superstar Luka Modrić made the final World Cup squad in spite of not playing in a single qualification match. Croatia selected Bad Brückenau in northern Bavaria as their training base. The team played four warm-up matches in preparation for the World Cup, defeating Austria in Vienna 4–1, drawing Iran in Osijek 2–2, before losing to Poland and Spain in friendlies in Germany and Switzerland, respectively. A pitch incident marred Croatia's opening game against Brazil, a 1–0 loss, when a Croatian fan ran onto the pitch near Dado Pršo. Security also confiscated 823 flares, but two flares were successfully lit in the Croatian supporters' section.

After a scoreless draw with Japan, Croatia entered their final match against Australia needing a win to advance. Darijo Srna scored the opener after two minutes and Croatia immediately began playing defensively to protect their lead, allowing the Australians to pressure for the rest of the first half until Craig Moore converted a penalty in the 38th minute after a Stjepan Tomas handball. A defensive error by Australian keeper Kalac led to Niko Kovač putting Croatia up again in the 58th, but this led to Australia pressing again with Harry Kewell equalising with eleven minutes left. The final part of the game was marred by a second yellow card shown to Josip Šimunić without him getting sent off by referee Graham Poll - Šimunić would eventually receive his sending off after a "third" yellow card in the game's final moments.

=== Squad ===

Croatia's 3–4–1–2 lineup at the 2006 World Cup
- Marko Babić
- Boško Balaban
- Ivan Bošnjak
- Tomislav Butina
- Joey Didulica
- Ivan Klasnić
- Niko Kovač (c)
- Robert Kovač
- Niko Kranjčar
- Ivan Leko
- Jerko Leko
- Luka Modrić
- Ivica Olić
- Stipe Pletikosa
- Dado Pršo
- Darijo Srna
- Anthony Šerić
- Dario Šimić
- Josip Šimunić
- Mario Tokić
- Stjepan Tomas
- Igor Tudor
- Jurica Vranješ
Head coach: Zlatko Kranjčar

=== Group stage ===
Pos	Team	Pld	W	D	L	GF	GA	GD	Pts	Qualification
1	Brazil	3	3	0	0	7	1	+6	9	Advance to knockout stage
2	Australia	3	1	1	1	5	5	0	4	Advance to knockout stage
3	Croatia	3	0	2	1	2	3	−1	2	
4	Japan	3	0	1	2	2	7	−5	1	

Source: FIFA
Rules for classification: Tie-breaking criteria
13 June 2006
21:00

Brazil	1–0	Croatia
Kaká 44'	Report

Olympiastadion, Berlin
Attendance: 72,000
Referee: Benito Archundia (Mexico)

18 June 2006
15:00

Japan	0–0	Croatia
	Report

FIFA WM Stadion Nürnberg, Nuremberg
Attendance: 41,000
Referee: Frank De Bleeckere (Belgium)

22 June 2006
21:00

Croatia	2–2	Australia
Srna 2'; N. Kovač 56'	Report	Moore 38' (pen.); Kewell 79'

Gottlieb-Daimler-Stadion, Stuttgart
Attendance: 52,000
Referee: Graham Poll (England)

== Croatia in Brazil 2014 ==
=== Squad ===

Croatia's 4–2–3–1 lineup at the 2014 World Cup
- Milan Badelj
- Marcelo Brozović
- Vedran Ćorluka
- Eduardo da Silva
- Nikica Jelavić
- Mateo Kovačić
- Dejan Lovren
- Mario Mandžukić
- Luka Modrić
- Ivica Olić
- Ivan Perišić
- Stipe Pletikosa
- Danijel Pranjić
- Ivan Rakitić
- Ante Rebić
- Sammir
- Gordon Schildenfeld
- Darijo Srna (c)
- Danijel Subašić
- Domagoj Vida
- Šime Vrsaljko
- Ognjen Vukojević
- Oliver Zelenika
Head coach:Niko Kovač

=== Group stage ===
Pos	Team	Pld	W	D	L	GF	GA	GD	Pts	Qualification
1	Brazil (H)	3	2	1	0	7	2	+5	7	Advance to knockout stage
2	Mexico	3	2	1	0	4	1	+3	7	Advance to knockout stage
3	Croatia	3	1	0	2	6	6	0	3	
4	Cameroon	3	0	0	3	1	9	−8	0	

Source: FIFA
Rules for classification: Tie-breaking criteria
(H) Hosts
12 June 2014
17:00 BRT (UTC−3)

Brazil	3–1	Croatia
Neymar 29', 71' (pen.); Oscar 90+1'		Marcelo 12' (o.g.)

Arena de São Paulo, São Paulo
Attendance: 62,103
Referee: Yuichi Nishimura (Japan)

18 June 2014
18:00 AMT (UTC−4)

Cameroon	0–4	Croatia
		Olić 11'; Perišić 48'; Mandžukić 61', 73'

Arena da Amazônia, Manaus
Attendance: 39,982
Referee: Pedro Proença (Portugal)

23 June 2014
17:00 BRT (UTC−3)

Croatia	1–3	Mexico
Perišić 87'		Márquez 72'; Guardado 75'; Hernández 82'

Itaipava Arena Pernambuco, Recife
Attendance: 41,212
Referee: Ravshan Irmatov (Uzbekistan)

== Croatia in Russia 2018 ==
=== Squad ===

Croatia's 4–3–3 lineup at the 2018 World Cup
- Milan Badelj
- Filip Bradarić
- Marcelo Brozović
- Duje Ćaleta-Car
- Vedran Ćorluka
- Tin Jedvaj
- Lovre Kalinić
- Nikola Kalinić
- Mateo Kovačić
- Andrej Kramarić
- Dominik Livaković
- Dejan Lovren
- Mario Mandžukić
- Luka Modrić (c)
- Ivan Perišić
- Josip Pivarić
- Marko Pjaca
- Ivan Rakitić
- Ante Rebić
- Ivan Strinić
- Danijel Subašić
- Domagoj Vida
- Šime Vrsaljko
Head coach: Zlatko Dalić

=== Group stage ===
Pos	Team	Pld	W	D	L	GF	GA	GD	Pts	Qualification
1	Croatia	3	3	0	0	7	1	+6	9	Advance to knockout stage
2	Argentina	3	1	1	1	3	5	−2	4	Advance to knockout stage
3	Nigeria	3	1	0	2	3	4	−1	3	
4	Iceland	3	0	1	2	2	5	−3	1	

Source: FIFA
Rules for classification: Group stage tiebreakers
16 June 2018
21:00 KALT (UTC+2)

Croatia	2–0	Nigeria
Etebo 32' (o.g.); Modrić 71' (pen.)

Kaliningrad Stadium, Kaliningrad
Attendance: 31,136
Referee: Sandro Ricci (Brazil)

21 June 2018
21:00 MSK (UTC+3)

Argentina	0–3	Croatia
		Rebić 53'; Modrić 80'; Rakitić 90+1'

Nizhny Novgorod Stadium, Nizhny Novgorod
Attendance: 43,319
Referee: Ravshan Irmatov (Uzbekistan)

26 June 2018
21:00 MSK (UTC+3)

Iceland	1–2	Croatia
Sigurðsson 76' (pen.)		Badelj 53'; Perišić 90'

Rostov Arena, Rostov-on-Don
Attendance: 43,472
Referee: Antonio Mateu Lahoz (Spain)

=== Knockout stage ===
Round of 16

1 July 2018
21:00 MSK (UTC+3)

Croatia	1–1 (a.e.t.)	Denmark
Mandžukić 4'		M. Jørgensen 1'
Penalties
Badelj (penalty missed); Kramarić (penalty scored); Modrić (penalty scored); Pivarić (penalty missed); Rakitić (penalty scored)	3–2	(penalty missed) Eriksen; (penalty scored) Kjær; (penalty scored) Krohn-Dehli; (penalty missed) Schöne; (penalty missed) N. Jørgensen

Nizhny Novgorod Stadium, Nizhny Novgorod
Attendance: 40,851
Referee: Néstor Pitana (Argentina)

Quarter-finals

7 July 2018
21:00 MSK (UTC+3)

Russia	2–2 (a.e.t.)	Croatia
Cheryshev 31'; Fernandes 115'		Kramarić 39'; Vida 101'
Penalties
Smolov (penalty missed); Dzagoev (penalty scored); Fernandes (penalty missed); Ignashevich (penalty scored); Kuzyayev (penalty scored)	3–4	(penalty scored) Brozović; (penalty missed) Kovačić; (penalty scored) Modrić; (penalty scored) Vida; (penalty scored) Rakitić

Fisht Olympic Stadium, Sochi
Attendance: 44,287
Referee: Sandro Ricci (Brazil)

Semi-finals

11 July 2018
21:00 MSK (UTC+3)

Croatia	2–1 (a.e.t.)	England
Perišić 68'; Mandžukić 109'		Trippier 5'

Luzhniki Stadium, Moscow
Attendance: 78,011
Referee: Cüneyt Çakır (Turkey)

Final

15 July 2018
18:00 MSK (UTC+3)

France	4–2	Croatia
Mandžukić 18' (o.g.); Griezmann 38' (pen.); Pogba 59'; Mbappé 65'		Perišić 28'; Mandžukić 69'

Luzhniki Stadium, Moscow
Attendance: 78,011
Referee: Néstor Pitana (Argentina)

== Croatia in Qatar 2022 ==
=== Squad ===

Croatia's 4–3–3 lineup at the 2022 World Cup
- Borna Barišić
- Marcelo Brozović
- Ante Budimir
- Martin Erlić
- Ivo Grbić
- Joško Gvardiol
- Ivica Ivušić
- Kristijan Jakić
- Josip Juranović
- Mateo Kovačić
- Andrej Kramarić
- Marko Livaja
- Dominik Livaković
- Dejan Lovren
- Lovro Majer
- Luka Modrić (c)
- Mislav Oršić
- Mario Pašalić
- Ivan Perišić
- Bruno Petković
- Borna Sosa
- Josip Stanišić
- Luka Sučić
- Josip Šutalo
- Domagoj Vida
- Nikola Vlašić
Head coach: Zlatko Dalić

=== Group stage ===
Pos	Team	Pld	W	D	L	GF	GA	GD	Pts	Qualification
1	Morocco	3	2	1	0	4	1	+3	7	Advanced to knockout stage
2	Croatia	3	1	2	0	4	1	+3	5	Advanced to knockout stage
3	Belgium	3	1	1	1	1	2	−1	4	
4	Canada	3	0	0	3	2	7	−5	0	

Source: FIFA
Rules for classification: Group stage tiebreakers
23 November 2022
13:00

Morocco	0–0	Croatia

Al Bayt Stadium, Al Khor
Attendance: 59,407
Referee: Fernando Rapallini (Argentina)

27 November 2022
19:00

Croatia	4–1	Canada
Kramarić 36', 70'; Livaja 44'; Majer 90+4'		Davies 2'

Khalifa International Stadium, Al Rayyan
Attendance: 44,374
Referee: Andrés Matonte (Uruguay)

1 December 2022
18:00

Croatia	0–0	Belgium

Ahmad bin Ali Stadium, Al Rayyan
Attendance: 43,984
Referee: Anthony Taylor (England)

=== Knockout stage ===
Round of 16

5 December 2022
18:00

Japan	1–1 (a.e.t.)	Croatia
Maeda 43'		Perišić 55'
Penalties
Minamino (penalty missed); Mitoma (penalty missed); Asano (penalty scored); Yoshida (penalty missed)	1–3	(penalty scored) Vlašić; (penalty scored) Brozović; (penalty missed) Livaja; (penalty scored) Pašalić

Al Janoub Stadium, Al Wakrah
Attendance: 42,523
Referee: Ismail Elfath (United States)

Quarter-finals

9 December 2022
18:00

Croatia	1–1 (a.e.t.)	Brazil
Petković 117'		Neymar 105+1'
Penalties
Vlašić (penalty scored); Majer (penalty scored); Modrić (penalty scored); Oršić (penalty scored)	4–2	(penalty missed) Rodrygo; (penalty scored) Casemiro; (penalty scored) Pedro; (penalty missed) Marquinhos

Education City Stadium, Al Rayyan
Attendance: 43,893
Referee: Michael Oliver (England)

Semi-finals

13 December 2022
22:00

Argentina	3–0	Croatia
Messi 34' (pen.); Alvarez 39', 69'

Lusail Stadium, Lusail
Attendance: 88,966
Referee: Daniele Orsato (Italy)

Match for third place

17 December 2022
18:00

Croatia	2–1	Morocco
Gvardiol 7'; Oršić 42'		Dari 9'

Khalifa International Stadium, Al Rayyan
Attendance: 44,137
Referee: Abdulrahman Al-Jassim (Qatar)

== Croatia in United States/Canada/Mexico 2026 ==

Croatia's 4–2-3-1 lineup at the 2026 World Cup

=== Group stage ===
Pos	Team	Pld	W	D	L	GF	GA	GD	Pts	Qualification
1	England	3	2	1	0	6	2	+4	7	Advance to knockout stage
2	Croatia	3	2	0	1	5	5	0	6	Advance to knockout stage
3	Ghana	3	1	1	1	2	2	0	4	Advance to knockout stage
4	Panama	3	0	0	3	0	4	−4	0	

Source: FIFA
June 17, 2026
3:00 p.m. UTC−5

England	4–2	Croatia
Kane 12' (pen.), 42'; Bellingham 47'; Rashford 85'	(Note: "England vs Croatia | First Stage | FIFA World Cup 2026". FIFA. Retrieved June 17, 2026.; "Match Report – Group L – England v. Croatia". FIFA. June 17, 2026. Retrieved June 17, 2026.; "Post match summary report – Group L – England v. Croatia". FIFA. June 17, 2026. Retrieved June 19, 2026.)	Baturina 36'; Musa 45+5'

AT&T Stadium, Arlington
Attendance: 70,389
Referee: Clément Turpin (France)

June 23, 2026
7:00 p.m. UTC−4

Panama	0–1	Croatia
	(Note: "Panama vs Croatia | First Stage | FIFA World Cup 2026". FIFA. Retrieved June 24, 2026.; "Match Report – Group L – Panama v. Croatia". FIFA. June 24, 2026. Retrieved June 24, 2026.; "Post match summary report – Group L – Panama v. Croatia". FIFA. June 24, 2026. Retrieved June 25, 2026.)	Budimir 54'

BMO Field, Toronto
Attendance: 43,036
Referee: Pierre Atcho (Gabon)

June 27, 2026
5:00 p.m. UTC−4

Croatia	2–1	Ghana
P. Sučić 31'; Vlašić 83'	(Note: "Croatia vs Ghana | First Stage | FIFA World Cup 2026". FIFA. Retrieved June 27, 2026.; "Match Report – Group L – Croatia v. Ghana". FIFA. June 27, 2026. Retrieved June 27, 2026.; "Post match summary report – Group L – Croatia v. Ghana". FIFA. June 28, 2026. Retrieved June 28, 2026.)	Luckassen 73'

Lincoln Financial Field, Philadelphia
Attendance: 68,324
Referee: Drew Fischer (Canada)

=== Knockout stage ===
Round of 32

July 2, 2026
7:00 p.m. UTC−4

Portugal	2–1	Croatia
Ronaldo 68' (pen.); Ramos 90+4'	(Note: "Portugal vs Croatia | Round of 32 | FIFA World Cup 2026". FIFA. Retrieved July 3, 2026.; "Match Report – Round of 32 – Portugal v. Croatia". FIFA. July 3, 2026. Retrieved July 3, 2026.; "Post match summary report – Round of 32 – Portugal v. Croatia". FIFA. July 2, 2026. Retrieved July 3, 2026.)	Perišić 53'

BMO Field, Toronto
Attendance: 43,036
Referee: Espen Eskås (Norway)

== List of matches ==
World Cup	Round	Opponent	Confederation	Score	Result	Venue	Croatia scorers
1998	Group H	Jamaica	CONCACAF	3–1	W	Lens	Stanić, Prosinečki, Šuker
1998	Group H	Japan	AFC	1–0	W	Nantes	Šuker
1998	Group H	Argentina	CONMEBOL	0–1	L	Bordeaux	—
1998	Round of 16	Romania	UEFA	1–0	W	Bordeaux	Šuker
1998	Quarter-final	Germany	UEFA	3–0	W	Lyon	Jarni, Vlaović, Šuker
1998	Semi-final	France	UEFA	1–2	L	Saint-Denis	Šuker
1998	Match for third place	Netherlands	UEFA	2–1	W	Paris	Prosinečki, Šuker
2002	Group G	Mexico	CONCACAF	0–1	L	Niigata	—
2002	Group G	Italy	UEFA	2–1	W	Ibaraki	Olić, Rapaić
2002	Group G	Ecuador	CONMEBOL	0–1	L	Yokohama	—
2006	Group F	Brazil	CONMEBOL	0–1	L	Berlin	—
2006	Group F	Japan	AFC	0–0	D	Nuremberg	—
2006	Group F	Australia	OFC	2–2	D	Stuttgart	Srna, N. Kovač
2014	Group A	Brazil	CONMEBOL	1–3	L	São Paulo	Marcelo (o.g.)
2014	Group A	Cameroon	CAF	4–0	W	Manaus	Olić, Perišić, Mandžukić (2)
2014	Group A	Mexico	CONCACAF	1–3	L	Recife	Perišić
2018	Group D	Nigeria	CAF	2–0	W	Kaliningrad	Etebo (o.g.), Modrić
2018	Group D	Argentina	CONMEBOL	3–0	W	Nizhny Novgorod	Rebić, Modrić, Rakitić
2018	Group D	Iceland	UEFA	2–1	W	Rostov-on-Don	Badelj, Perišić
2018	Round of 16	Denmark	UEFA	1–1 (a.e.t.) (3–2 p)	D	Nizhny Novgorod	Mandžukić
2018	Quarter-finals	Russia	UEFA	2–2 (a.e.t.) (4–3 p)	D	Sochi	Kramarić, Vida
2018	Semi-finals	England	UEFA	2–1 (a.e.t.)	W	Moscow	Perišić, Mandžukić
2018	Final	France	UEFA	2–4	L	Moscow	Perišić, Mandžukić
2022	Group F	Morocco	CAF	0–0	D	Al Khor	—
2022	Group F	Canada	CONCACAF	4–1	W	Al Rayyan	Kramarić (2), Livaja, Majer
2022	Group F	Belgium	UEFA	0–0	D	Al Rayyan	—
2022	Round of 16	Japan	AFC	1–1 (a.e.t.) (3–1 p)	D	Al Wakrah	Perišić
2022	Quarter-finals	Brazil	CONMEBOL	1–1 (a.e.t.) (4–2 p)	D	Al Rayyan	Petković
2022	Semi-finals	Argentina	CONMEBOL	0–3	L	Lusail	—
2022	Match for third place	Morocco	CAF	2–1	W	Al Rayyan	Gvardiol, Oršić
2026	Group L	England	UEFA	2–4	L	Arlington	Baturina, Musa
2026	Group L	Panama	CONCACAF	1–0	W	Toronto	Budimir
2026	Group L	Ghana	CAF	2–1	W	Philadelphia	Sučić, Vlašić
2026	Round of 32	Portugal	UEFA	1–2	L	Toronto	Perišić

=== By opponent ===
Opponent	Pld	W	D	L	GF	GA	GD
Argentina	3	1	0	2	3	4	−2
Australia	1	0	1	0	2	2	0
Belgium	1	0	1	0	0	0	0
Brazil	3	0	1	2	2	5	−3
Cameroon	1	1	0	0	4	0	+4
Canada	1	1	0	0	4	1	+3
Denmark	1	0	1	0	1	1	0
Ecuador	1	0	0	1	0	1	−1
England	2	1	0	1	4	5	–1
France	2	0	0	2	3	6	−3
Germany	1	1	0	0	3	0	+3
Ghana	1	1	0	0	2	1	+1
Iceland	1	1	0	0	2	1	+1
Italy	1	1	0	0	2	1	+1
Jamaica	1	1	0	0	3	1	+2
Japan	3	1	2	0	2	1	+1
Mexico	2	0	0	2	1	4	−3
Morocco	2	1	1	0	2	1	+1
Netherlands	1	1	0	0	2	1	+1
Nigeria	1	1	0	0	2	0	+2
Panama	1	1	0	0	1	0	+1
Portugal	1	0	0	1	1	2	−1
Romania	1	1	0	0	1	0	+1
Russia	1	0	1	0	2	2	0

== Player records ==
=== Most appearances ===
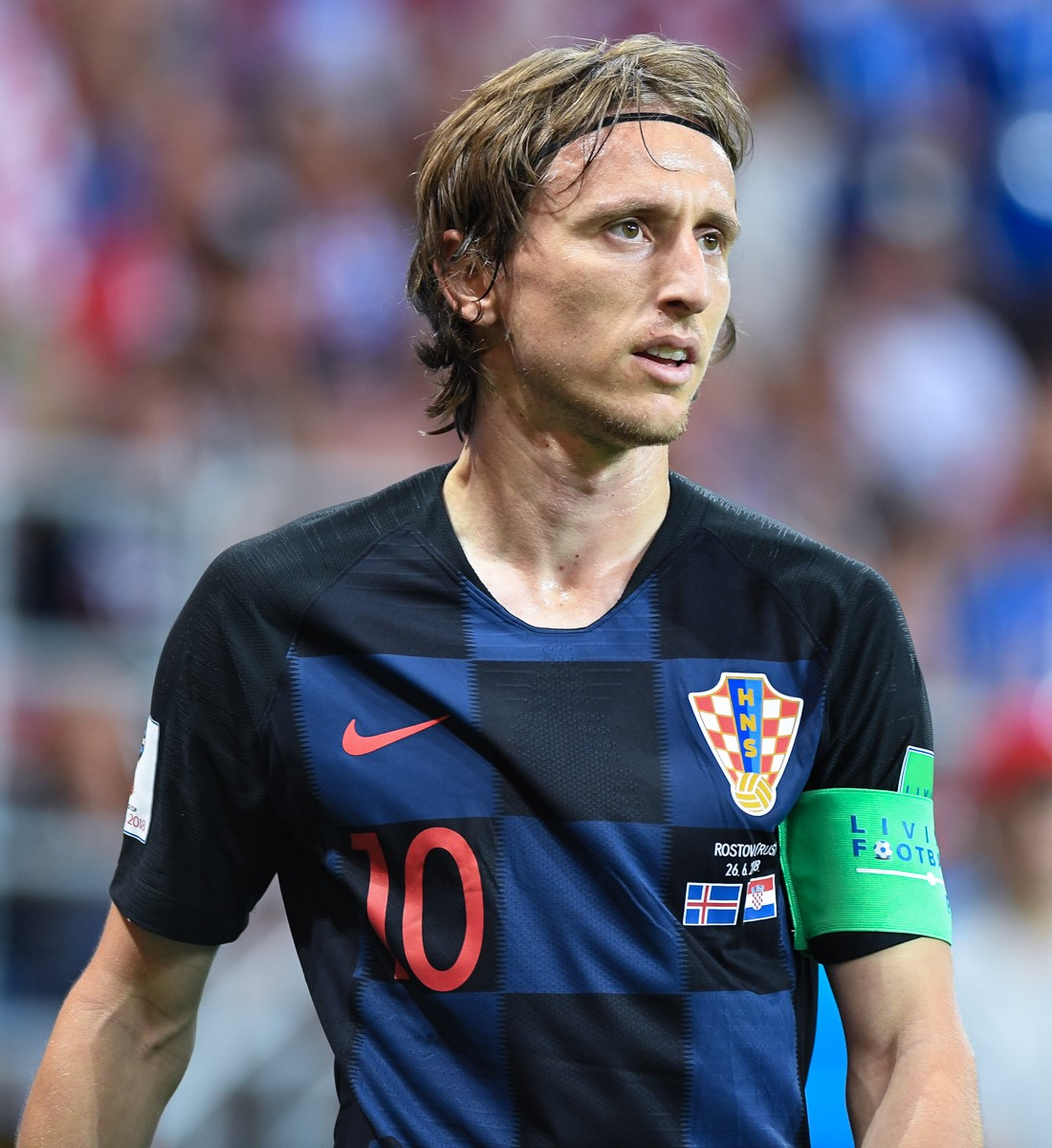
Luka Modrić leads Croatia in World Cup appearances.

Rank	Player	Matches	World Cups
1	Luka Modrić	23	2006, 2014, 2018, 2022 and 2026
2	Ivan Perišić	21	2014, 2018, 2022 and 2026
3	Mateo Kovačić	19	2014, 2018, 2022 and 2026
4	Andrej Kramarić	17	2018, 2022 and 2026
5	Dejan Lovren	16	2014, 2018 and 2022
6	Marcelo Brozović	13	2014, 2018 and 2022
7	Dario Šimić	11	1998, 2002 and 2006
7	Joško Gvardiol	11	2022 and 2026
7	Dominik Livaković	11	2022 and 2026
7	Mario Pašalić	11	2022 and 2026

=== Goalscorers ===
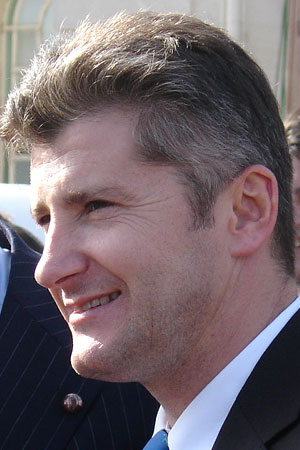
In 1998, Davor Šuker became the oldest-ever World Cup Golden Boot winner at age 30.

On June 14, 1998, Mario Stanić made history by scoring Croatia's first-ever FIFA World Cup goal. It happened on their opening match against Jamaica in Lens.

Player	Goals	1998	2002	2006	2014	2018	2022	2026
Ivan Perišić	7				2	3	1	1
Davor Šuker	6	6						
Mario Mandžukić	5				2	3		
Andrej Kramarić	3					1	2	
Robert Prosinečki	2	2						
Ivica Olić	2		1		1			
Luka Modrić	2					2		
Mario Stanić	1	1						
Robert Jarni	1	1						
Goran Vlaović	1	1						
Milan Rapaić	1		1					
Darijo Srna	1			1				
Niko Kovač	1			1				
Ante Rebić	1					1		
Ivan Rakitić	1					1		
Milan Badelj	1					1		
Domagoj Vida	1					1		
Marko Livaja	1						1	
Lovro Majer	1						1	
Bruno Petković	1						1	
Joško Gvardiol	1						1	
Mislav Oršić	1						1	
Martin Baturina	1							1
Petar Musa	1							1
Ante Budimir	1							1
Petar Sučić	1							1
Nikola Vlašić	1							1
Total	48	11	2	2	5	14	8	6

== Awards ==
Team Awards

- (silver) Runners-up (1): 2018
- (bronze) Third place (2): 1998, 2022

Individual Awards

- Golden Ball: Luka Modrić (2018)
- Silver Ball: Davor Šuker (1998)
- Bronze Ball: Luka Modrić (2022)
- Golden Boot: Davor Šuker (1998)
- All-Star Team: Davor Šuker (1998), Luka Modrić (2018)

== See also ==
- Croatia in the UEFA Nations League
- Croatia at the UEFA European Championship
- List of Croatia international footballers
