= Aguinaga =

Aguinaga is a surname of Basque origins. Notable people with the surname include:

- Alejandro Aguinaga (born 1950), Peruvian physician and politician
- Álex Aguinaga (born 1968), Ecuadorian footballer and manager
- Daniel Aguiñaga (born 1994), Mexican footballer
- Javi Martínez (Javier Martínez Aguinaga, born 1988), Spanish footballer
- Juan Aguinaga (born 1978), Ecuadorian footballer
- Marcela Aguiñaga (born 1973), Ecuadorian politician
