= 2014 FIFA World Cup Group A =

Football tournament group stage

The 32 teams at the 2014 FIFA World Cup were split into eight groups of four, labelled A–H. Group A comprised Brazil, Croatia, Mexico and Cameroon. The first match was played on 12 June 2014, with the last two played concurrently on 23 June. The top two teams, Brazil and Mexico, advanced to the round of 16.

== Teams ==
Draw position	Team	Confederation	Method of qualification	Date of qualification	Finals appearance	Last appearance	Previous best performance	FIFA Rankings	
Draw position	Team	Confederation	Method of qualification	Date of qualification	Finals appearance	Last appearance	Previous best performance	October 2013 (Note: The rankings of October 2013 were used for seeding for the final draw.)	June 2014
A1 (seed)	Brazil	CONMEBOL	Hosts	30 October 2007	20th	2010	Winners (1958, 1962, 1970, 1994, 2002)	11	3
A2	Croatia	UEFA	UEFA play-off winners	19 November 2013	4th	2006	Third place (1998)	18	18
A3	Mexico	CONCACAF	CONCACAF vs OFC play-off winners	20 November 2013	15th	2010	Quarter-finals (1970, 1986)	24	20
A4	Cameroon	CAF	CAF third round winners	17 November 2013	7th	2010	Quarter-finals (1990)	59	56

== Standings ==
Pos	Team	Pld	W	D	L	GF	GA	GD	Pts	Qualification
1	Brazil (H)	3	2	1	0	7	2	+5	7	Advance to knockout stage
2	Mexico	3	2	1	0	4	1	+3	7	Advance to knockout stage
3	Croatia	3	1	0	2	6	6	0	3	
4	Cameroon	3	0	0	3	1	9	−8	0	

Source: FIFA
Rules for classification: Tie-breaking criteria
(H) Hosts
- Brazil advanced to play Chile (runner-up of Group B) in the round of 16.
- Mexico advanced to play Netherlands (winner of Group B) in the round of 16.

== Matches ==
=== Brazil vs Croatia ===
The two teams had met in two previous matches, including in the 2006 FIFA World Cup group stage, won by Brazil 1–0. Croatia forward Mario Mandžukić was suspended for the match, after being sent off in the team's final qualifier against Iceland.

Croatia opened the scoring in the 11th minute through a Marcelo own goal, as the ball bounced off him into the net after Nikica Jelavić deflected Ivica Olić's cross. Neymar equalized for the hosts with a 25-yard (23 m) shot after receiving a pass from Oscar. In the second half, Brazil took the lead with Neymar's penalty after Dejan Lovren was controversially judged to have fouled Fred in the penalty area. Croatia had a potential equalizer disallowed, after a foul was again controversially called on the Brazilian goalkeeper, Júlio César. In added time, Oscar sealed the win, toe-poking the third goal for Brazil from 22 yards (20 m) after receiving a pass from Ramires.

Post-match, FIFA referees chief Massimo Busacca defended the officials for awarding the penalty and insisted there had been some contact between Lovren and Fred, even if it was minimal. However, former top-level FIFA referee Markus Merk criticized FIFA for having Yuichi Nishimura as the referee in the opening match, labelling the refereeing in the match as "embarrassing".

The game was notable for a number of pioneering events. This was the first occasion in FIFA World Cup history on which an own goal (which was also the first ever own goal scored by Brazil in World Cup finals) opened scoring in the tournament. As the first game played at this World Cup, the match also saw the first use of vanishing spray to mark free kick spots, and the advent of goal-line technology, two innovations introduced during the tournament.

12 June 2014
17:00 BRT (UTC−3)

Brazil	3–1	Croatia
Neymar 29', 71' (pen.); Oscar 90+1'		Marcelo 12' (o.g.)

Arena de São Paulo, São Paulo
Attendance: 62,103
Referee: Yuichi Nishimura (Japan)

Brazil	Croatia

GK	12	Júlio César
RB	2	Dani Alves
CB	3	Thiago Silva (c)
CB	4	David Luiz
LB	6	Marcelo
DM	8	Paulinho		(substituted off) 63'
DM	17	Luiz Gustavo	(yellow card) 88'
RW	7	Hulk		(substituted off) 68'
AM	11	Oscar
LW	10	Neymar	(yellow card) 27'	(substituted off) 88'
CF	9	Fred
Substitutions:
MF	18	Hernanes		(substituted on) 63'
MF	20	Bernard		(substituted on) 68'
MF	16	Ramires		(substituted on) 88'
Manager:
Luiz Felipe Scolari

GK	1	Stipe Pletikosa
RB	11	Darijo Srna (c)
CB	5	Vedran Ćorluka	(yellow card) 65'
CB	6	Dejan Lovren	(yellow card) 69'
LB	2	Šime Vrsaljko
CM	10	Luka Modrić
CM	7	Ivan Rakitić
RW	4	Ivan Perišić
AM	20	Mateo Kovačić		(substituted off) 61'
LW	18	Ivica Olić
CF	9	Nikica Jelavić		(substituted off) 78'
Substitutions:
MF	14	Marcelo Brozović		(substituted on) 61'
FW	16	Ante Rebić		(substituted on) 78'
Manager:
Niko Kovač

Man of the Match:
Neymar (Brazil)

Assistant referees:
Toru Sagara (Japan)
Toshiyuki Nagi (Japan)
Fourth official:
Alireza Faghani (Iran)
Fifth official:
Hassan Kamranifar (Iran)

=== Mexico vs Cameroon ===
The two teams had met in one previous match, in a friendly in 1993, won by Mexico 1–0.

Mexico's Giovani dos Santos had two goals disallowed for offside in the first half. However, replays showed that he was in line with the last defender for the first case, while the ball came from a Cameroon player for the second. In the second half, dos Santos had a shot saved by the Cameroon goalkeeper, Charles Itandje, but the ball rebounded into the path of Oribe Peralta, who slotted the ball into the empty net with his left foot.

Mexico captain Rafael Márquez made history by becoming the first player to captain his nation in four different World Cups. Samuel Eto'o also appeared in his fourth World Cup, joining fellow Cameroonians Jacques Songo'o and Rigobert Song as the only African players to have achieved the feat.

13 June 2014
13:00 BRT (UTC−3)

Mexico	1–0	Cameroon
Peralta 61'

Arena das Dunas, Natal
Attendance: 39,216
Referee: Wilmar Roldán (Colombia)

Mexico	Cameroon

GK	13	Guillermo Ochoa
CB	2	Francisco Rodríguez
CB	4	Rafael Márquez (c)
CB	15	Héctor Moreno	(yellow card) 57'
RWB	22	Paul Aguilar
LWB	7	Miguel Layún
DM	23	José Juan Vázquez
CM	6	Héctor Herrera		(substituted off) 90+1'
CM	18	Andrés Guardado		(substituted off) 69'
SS	10	Giovani dos Santos
CF	19	Oribe Peralta		(substituted off) 74'
Substitutions:
MF	8	Marco Fabián		(substituted on) 69'
FW	14	Javier Hernández		(substituted on) 74'
DF	3	Carlos Salcido		(substituted on) 90+1'
Manager:
Miguel Herrera

GK	16	Charles Itandje
RB	4	Cédric Djeugoué		(substituted off) 46'
CB	3	Nicolas N'Koulou
CB	14	Aurélien Chedjou
LB	2	Benoît Assou-Ekotto
DM	6	Alex Song		(substituted off) 79'
RM	17	Stéphane Mbia
LM	18	Eyong Enoh
AM	8	Benjamin Moukandjo
AM	13	Eric Maxim Choupo-Moting
CF	9	Samuel Eto'o (c)
Substitutions:
DF	5	Dany Nounkeu	(yellow card) 77'	(substituted on) 46'
FW	15	Pierre Webó		(substituted on) 79'
Manager:
(Germany) Volker Finke

Man of the Match:
Giovani dos Santos (Mexico)

Assistant referees:
Humberto Clavijo (Colombia)
Eduardo Díaz (Colombia)
Fourth official:
Norbert Hauata (Tahiti)
Fifth official:
Aden Marwa (Kenya)

=== Brazil vs Mexico ===
The two teams had met in 38 previous matches, including three times in the FIFA World Cup group stage, all won by Brazil (1950: 4–0; 1954: 5–0; 1962: 2–0). Their most recent meeting was in the 2013 FIFA Confederations Cup group stage, won by Brazil 2–0.

Mexican goalkeeper Guillermo Ochoa made four outstanding saves to deny Brazil. In the first half, he saved a header from Neymar tight to his right to push the ball around the post, and blocked a close-range effort from Paulinho. In the second half, he saved a low shot from Neymar and a late point-blank header from Thiago Silva.

This was the first time since the 1970 FIFA World Cup that the host team drew 0–0 in the group stage (in the case, the own Mexico, in the opening match of the respective tournament, an 0-0 draw with Soviet Union). Mexico became the first team from outside UEFA or CONMEBOL to take a point from Brazil in the World Cup.

17 June 2014
16:00 BRT (UTC−3)

Brazil	0–0	Mexico

Estádio Castelão, Fortaleza
Attendance: 60,342
Referee: Cüneyt Çakır (Turkey)

Brazil	Mexico

GK	12	Júlio César
RB	2	Dani Alves
CB	3	Thiago Silva (c)	(yellow card) 79'
CB	4	David Luiz
LB	6	Marcelo
DM	8	Paulinho
DM	17	Luiz Gustavo
CM	11	Oscar		(substituted off) 84'
RW	16	Ramires	(yellow card) 45'	(substituted off) 46'
LW	10	Neymar
CF	9	Fred		(substituted off) 68'
Substitutions:
MF	20	Bernard		(substituted on) 46'
FW	21	Jô		(substituted on) 68'
MF	19	Willian		(substituted on) 84'
Manager:
Luiz Felipe Scolari

GK	13	Guillermo Ochoa
CB	2	Francisco Rodríguez
CB	4	Rafael Márquez (c)
CB	15	Héctor Moreno
RWB	22	Paul Aguilar	(yellow card) 59'
LWB	7	Miguel Layún
DM	23	José Juan Vázquez	(yellow card) 62'
CM	6	Héctor Herrera		(substituted off) 76'
CM	18	Andrés Guardado
SS	10	Giovani dos Santos		(substituted off) 84'
CF	19	Oribe Peralta		(substituted off) 74'
Substitutes:
FW	14	Javier Hernández		(substituted on) 74'
MF	8	Marco Fabián		(substituted on) 76'
FW	9	Raúl Jiménez		(substituted on) 84'
Manager:
Miguel Herrera

Man of the Match:
Guillermo Ochoa (Mexico)

Assistant referees:
Bahattin Duran (Turkey)
Tarık Ongun (Turkey)
Fourth official:
Svein Oddvar Moen (Norway)
Fifth official:
Kim Haglund (Norway)

=== Cameroon vs Croatia ===
The two teams had never met before.

In a match where both teams needed at least a point to stay alive in the competition, Croatia opened scoring when Ivica Olić scored from close range from Ivan Perišić's pass. Just before half time, Cameroon was reduced to 10 men when Alex Song was dismissed for an off the ball incident with Mario Mandžukić. Perišić scored at the beginning of the second half when he intercepted Cameroonian goalkeeper Charles Itandje's goal kick and ran 50 yards before slotting in at the near post. Mandžukić scored the last two goals, the first a header from Danijel Pranjić's corner and the second a tap in after Itandje parried Eduardo's shot into his path. The result confirmed Cameroon's elimination from the tournament.

In a case of infighting, Cameroonian defender Benoît Assou-Ekotto was caught on camera head-butting teammate Benjamin Moukandjo. Song later apologised to Mandžukić and his country for his ejection, while Cameroonian coach Volker Finke said he was very disappointed with their performance.

On 1 July 2014, Cameroon officials announced that they had opened an investigation on claims that seven of the Cameroon's players were involved in fixing the result. However, FIFA said there was no evidence that there were any match fixing in any of Cameroon's matches.

Olić, who previously scored a goal in the 2002 World Cup, became the second player to have a 12-year gap between World Cup goals, after Michael Laudrup in 1986 and 1998. Mandžukić became the first Croatian player to score a brace in a World Cup game. The 4–0 scoreline was also the biggest win by Croatia in the World Cup.

18 June 2014
18:00 AMT (UTC−4)

Cameroon	0–4	Croatia
		Olić 11'; Perišić 48'; Mandžukić 61', 73'

Arena da Amazônia, Manaus
Attendance: 39,982
Referee: Pedro Proença (Portugal)

Cameroon	Croatia

GK	16	Charles Itandje
RB	17	Stéphane Mbia
CB	14	Aurélien Chedjou		(substituted off) 46'
CB	3	Nicolas N'Koulou (c)
LB	2	Benoît Assou-Ekotto
DM	21	Joël Matip
CM	6	Alex Song	(red card) 40'
CM	18	Eyong Enoh
RW	13	Eric Maxim Choupo-Moting		(substituted off) 75'
LW	8	Benjamin Moukandjo
CF	10	Vincent Aboubakar		(substituted off) 70'
Substitutions:
DF	5	Dany Nounkeu		(substituted on) 46'
FW	15	Pierre Webó		(substituted on) 70'
MF	20	Edgar Salli		(substituted on) 75'
Manager:
(Germany) Volker Finke

GK	1	Stipe Pletikosa
RB	11	Darijo Srna (c)
CB	5	Vedran Ćorluka
CB	6	Dejan Lovren
LB	3	Danijel Pranjić
CM	10	Luka Modrić
CM	7	Ivan Rakitić
RW	4	Ivan Perišić		(substituted off) 78'
AM	19	Sammir		(substituted off) 72'
LW	18	Ivica Olić		(substituted off) 69'
CF	17	Mario Mandžukić
Substitutions:
FW	22	Eduardo	(yellow card) 89'	(substituted on) 69'
MF	20	Mateo Kovačić		(substituted on) 72'
FW	16	Ante Rebić		(substituted on) 78'
Manager:
Niko Kovač

Man of the Match:
Mario Mandžukić (Croatia)

Assistant referees:
Bertino Cunha (Portugal)
Tiago Trigo (Portugal)
Fourth official:
Walter López (Guatemala)
Fifth official:
Leonel Leal (Costa Rica)

=== Cameroon vs Brazil ===
The two teams had met in four previous matches, including in the 1994 FIFA World Cup group stage, won by Brazil 3–0. Their most recent meeting was in the 2003 FIFA Confederations Cup group stage, won by Cameroon 1–0. Cameroon midfielder Alex Song was suspended for the match (first match of a three-match ban), after being sent off in the previous match against Croatia.

Brazil, where a draw would guarantee their qualification to the knockout stage, opened the scoring in the 17th minute when Luiz Gustavo crossed from the left for Neymar to beat the goalkeeper with a first time low side-footed finish to the corner. Already-eliminated Cameroon equalised when Allan Nyom beat Dani Alves on the left before crossing for Joël Matip to finish from close range. Neymar put Brazil back in front when he collected the ball from Marcelo and ran at goal before finishing with a low right foot shot that wrong footed the goalkeeper from just inside the penalty area. In the second half David Luiz crossed from the left for Fred to extend Brazil's lead with a close range header before half-time substitute Fernandinho completed the scoring when he collected a pass from Oscar before finishing with a low right footed shot. The result assured that Brazil pipped Mexico on goal difference to qualify to the knockout stage as group winners.

The match was Brazil's 100th in the World Cup, and they followed Germany (which played their 100th match in their first game of the 2014 World Cup) to become the second team to reach the milestone.

23 June 2014
17:00 BRT (UTC−3)

Cameroon	1–4	Brazil
Matip 26'		Neymar 17', 35'; Fred 49'; Fernandinho 84'

Estádio Nacional Mané Garrincha, Brasília
Attendance: 69,112
Referee: Jonas Eriksson (Sweden)

Cameroon	Brazil

GK	16	Charles Itandje
RB	22	Allan Nyom
CB	3	Nicolas N'Koulou (c)
CB	21	Joël Matip
LB	12	Henri Bedimo
DM	7	Landry N'Guémo
CM	17	Stéphane Mbia	(yellow card) 80'
CM	18	Eyong Enoh	(yellow card) 11'
RW	13	Eric Maxim Choupo-Moting		(substituted off) 81'
LW	8	Benjamin Moukandjo		(substituted off) 58'
CF	10	Vincent Aboubakar		(substituted off) 72'
Substitutions:
MF	20	Edgar Salli	(yellow card) 76'	(substituted on) 58'
FW	15	Pierre Webó		(substituted on) 72'
MF	11	Jean Makoun		(substituted on) 81'
Manager:
(Germany) Volker Finke

GK	12	Júlio César
RB	2	Dani Alves
CB	3	Thiago Silva (c)
CB	4	David Luiz
LB	6	Marcelo
DM	17	Luiz Gustavo
RM	8	Paulinho	(substituted off) 46'
LM	11	Oscar
RW	7	Hulk	(substituted off) 63'
LW	10	Neymar	(substituted off) 71'
CF	9	Fred
Substitutions:
MF	5	Fernandinho	(substituted on) 46'
MF	16	Ramires	(substituted on) 63'
MF	19	Willian	(substituted on) 71'
Manager:
Luiz Felipe Scolari

Man of the Match:
Neymar (Brazil)

Assistant referees:
Mathias Klasenius (Sweden)
Daniel Wärnmark (Sweden)
Fourth official:
Svein Oddvar Moen (Norway)
Fifth official:
Kim Haglund (Norway)

=== Croatia vs Mexico ===
The two teams had met in three previous matches, including in the 2002 FIFA World Cup group stage, won by Mexico 1–0.

Coming into the final round of matches, Croatia needed to win to guarantee qualification to the knockout stage regardless of the result of Cameroon vs Brazil, while Mexico only needed a draw to do so. The game was goalless for the first 70 minutes, until a Héctor Herrera corner to the back post allowed Rafael Márquez to score from a header, outleaping the Croatian defenders. With Croatia progressing only by way of a win, they were caught out on a break a short time later where Andrés Guardado scored after receiving a pass from Oribe Peralta. Mexico scored their third goal when Márquez flicked on Guardado's corner with substitute Javier Hernández scoring at the back post. Ivan Perišić scored in his second consecutive World Cup match after a neat back pass from Ivan Rakitić to get a consolation goal for Croatia in the closing minutes of the game, before Croatia's Ante Rebić was sent off for a foul on Carlos Peña. Mexico qualified as group runners-up (behind Brazil on goal difference) on virtue of the win, while Croatia were eliminated.

With his goal, Márquez joined Cuauhtémoc Blanco as the only Mexican player to score in three World Cups.

23 June 2014
17:00 BRT (UTC−3)

Croatia	1–3	Mexico
Perišić 87'		Márquez 72'; Guardado 75'; Hernández 82'

Itaipava Arena Pernambuco, Recife
Attendance: 41,212
Referee: Ravshan Irmatov (Uzbekistan)

Croatia	Mexico

GK	1	Stipe Pletikosa
RB	11	Darijo Srna (c)
CB	5	Vedran Ćorluka
CB	6	Dejan Lovren
LB	2	Šime Vrsaljko		(substituted off) 58'
CM	7	Ivan Rakitić	(yellow card) 9'
CM	3	Danijel Pranjić		(substituted off) 74'
RW	4	Ivan Perišić
AM	10	Luka Modrić
LW	18	Ivica Olić		(substituted off) 69'
CF	17	Mario Mandžukić
Substitutions:
MF	20	Mateo Kovačić		(substituted on) 58'
FW	16	Ante Rebić	(red card) 89'	(substituted on) 69'
FW	9	Nikica Jelavić		(substituted on) 74'
Manager:
Niko Kovač

GK	13	Guillermo Ochoa
CB	2	Francisco Rodríguez
CB	4	Rafael Márquez (c)	(yellow card) 39'
CB	15	Héctor Moreno
RWB	22	Paul Aguilar
LWB	7	Miguel Layún
DM	23	José Juan Vázquez	(yellow card) 66'
CM	6	Héctor Herrera
CM	18	Andrés Guardado		(substituted off) 84'
SS	10	Giovani dos Santos		(substituted off) 62'
CF	19	Oribe Peralta		(substituted off) 79'
Substitutions:
FW	14	Javier Hernández		(substituted on) 62'
MF	21	Carlos Peña		(substituted on) 79'
MF	8	Marco Fabián		(substituted on) 84'
Manager:
Miguel Herrera

Man of the Match:
Rafael Márquez (Mexico)

Assistant referees:
Abdukhamidullo Rasulov (Uzbekistan)
Bakhadyr Kochkarov (Kyrgyzstan)
Fourth official:
Néant Alioum (Cameroon)
Fifth official:
Djibril Camara (Senegal)

== See also ==
- Brazil at the FIFA World Cup
- Cameroon at the FIFA World Cup
- Croatia at the FIFA World Cup
- Mexico at the FIFA World Cup
