= Édison Méndez =

Ecuadorian footballer (born 1979)

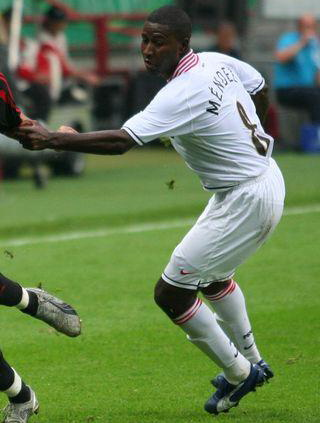
- Méndez playing for PSV Eindhoven in 2007

Personal information
- Full name: Édison Vicente Méndez Méndez
- Date of birth: 16 March 1979 (age 47)
- Place of birth: Ibarra, Ecuador
- Height: 1.75 m (5 ft 9 in)
- Positions: Winger; attacking midfielder; second striker

Youth career
- 1996–2001: Deportivo Quito

Senior career*
Years	Team	Apps	(Gls)
1997–2002	Deportivo Quito	193	(18)
2002–2003	El Nacional	34	(3)
2004	Irapuato	16	(5)
2004	Santos Laguna	14	(2)
2005–2007	LDU Quito	60	(6)
2006–2007	→ PSV Eindhoven (loan)	26	(5)
2007–2009	PSV Eindhoven	46	(4)
2009–2010	LDU Quito	23	(6)
2010	Atlético Mineiro	9	(0)
2011	Emelec	35	(5)
2012–2013	LDU Quito	47	(6)
2014	Santa Fe	10	(0)
2015	El Nacional	22	(4)
Total		535	(64)

International career
2000–2014	Ecuador	111	(18)

Managerial career
- 2020: El Nacional (assistant)
- 2020: El Nacional
- 2022–2023: LDU Quito (youth)
- 2022: LDU Quito (caretaker)
- 2023–2024: La Unión
- 2025: 11 de Mayo
- 2025: Leones (assistant)
- 2026: Leones
- * Club domestic league appearances and goals

Édison Vicente Méndez Méndez (Spanish pronunciation: [ˈeðisom ˈmendes]; born 16 March 1979) is an Ecuadorian football coach and former player who played as either a winger, second striker or attacking midfielder.

Méndez is a former Ecuador international and is the third-most capped player for his country.

== Club career ==
=== Deportivo Quito ===
Méndez began his career with Sociedad Deportivo Quito of his native Ecuador. After his 2002 FIFA World Cup performances, during which he scored the winning goal in Ecuador's 1–0 win over Croatia, he was rumored to have attracted interest from English clubs, notably Aston Villa and Everton.

=== Short spells in Ecuador and Mexico ===
He transferred to Club Irapuato of the Primera División de México for the latter part of the 2004 season, starting 16 games and scoring 5 goals during the remainder of that season. Following Irapuato's relegation the following year, Méndez moved to Santos Laguna, where he struggled to find a place, in 14 games, and scoring 2 goals.

He returned to Ecuador, and was part of the LDU Quito team who won the Ecuadorian Apertura season in 2005.

=== PSV Eindhoven ===
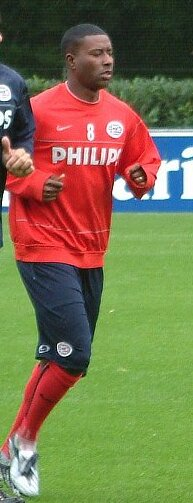
Méndez training with PSV Eindhoven in 2008

In 2006, shortly after the World Cup, there was speculation of a move to the Bundesliga, more specifically Hannover 96. He ended all rumours in August 2006 by signing a one-season loan deal with PSV Eindhoven, which was followed by a contract for three and a half years which would tie him to the Philips Stadion outfit until 2010. He made his debut in the Eredivisie against Willem II, and marked his stamp in his new club by scoring two goals for a 3–1 win. The following week he became the first Ecuadorian to play in the UEFA Champions League and made his debut against Liverpool He was voted Man of the Match in the game.

In March 2007, he became the first Ecuadorian to score in the UEFA Champions League by getting the only goal in the round of 16 match against Arsenal. Mendez, along with fellow midfielders Timmy Simons and veteran Philip Cocu helped PSV reach the quarterfinals.

Mendez's reputation was enhanced when he was among 50 players nominated for the Ballon d'Or-award for the best players in Europe. In Winter 2007, rumors stated that Mendez wanted a move back to Ecuador.

=== Return to Ecuador ===
On 4 August 2009, Mendez returned to Ecuador for personal reasons to play for his former team LDU Quito. However, there is speculation that he could return to the club for the 2012 season.

=== Going to Brazil ===
In March, Brazilian club Clube Atlético Mineiro announced Méndez as its new player. The Ecuadorian midfielder started defending his new team after the 2010 FIFA World Cup.

=== Independiente Santa Fe ===
On 11 December 2013, it was confirmed that Mendez would join Colombian side Santa Fe.

=== Return to El Nacional ===
On 7 January 2015, it was confirmed that would Méndez return to Ecuador to play for El Nacional.

== International career ==
=== Youth ===
Méndez participated at the South American U-20 Championship in Paraguay in 1999, and Olympic qualifying tournament in Brazil in January 2000. Two months later, he was called up to the full squad and made his debut in a 3–1 defeat against Honduras in Quito.

=== Senior ===
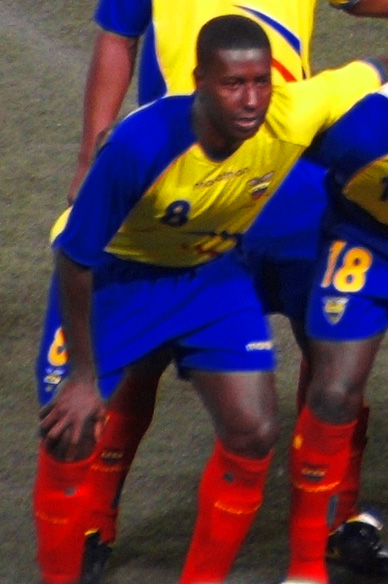
Méndez before a friendly match against Colombia in 2007

Méndez played in all three games of Ecuador's 2002 World Cup campaign, scoring the only goal in their final group stage match against Croatia to earn the country a first-ever win at a FIFA World Cup. The victory against Croatia came as a surprise, eliminating the side and sealing Méndez's reputation as a star. Aged just 23, he was seen by many to be the promise of Ecuadorian football and gained interest from many clubs.

Méndez scored five goals during 2006 World Cup qualification, including a dazzling double from long range against Paraguay in 2005, helping Ecuador to a 5–2 win in Quito on the way to ultimately securing a spot at the final tournament in Germany.

Méndez again played throughout his team's historic 2006 World Cup campaign, which culminated in a 1–0 defeat to England in the round of 16. He was credited with two assists across the tournament.

Méndez then played for Ecuador at the 2007 Copa América, scoring a consolation goal against Mexico in a 2–1 loss as his side were eliminated in the group stage. On 26 February 2008, Mendez announced his retirement from the national team, to the surprise of most Ecuadorians and the Latin American world. He stated that one of the reasons for his early retirement was dissatisfaction with newly appointed Ecuador coach Sixto Vizuete. However, on 12 May 2008, Méndez announced his return to the national team, after a meeting with Vizuete and the FEF president, Luis Chiriboga, in which they reportedly solved the differences and misunderstandings the parties had.

Méndez was part of Ecuador's squad at the 2014 World Cup in Brazil, but only played in the final eight minutes of his side's second match against Honduras; this made him the first Ecuadorian to feature at three different FIFA World Cup tournaments. On 30 June 2014, following Ecuador's elimination, Méndez announced his retirement from the national team, ending with a total of 111 caps and 18 goals across a span of fourteen years for his country.

== Playing style ==
He is known for his pace, accurate passing and long range shooting. He is also known as a dead-ball specialist, and generally takes free kicks and corners for his country and club. While he is right-footed, he can play on either wing as well as in the middle.

== Personal life ==
Méndez was born in Ibarra.

His nephew is fellow professional footballer and Ecuadorean international player Sebas Méndez.

== Career statistics ==
=== Club ===
Appearances and goals by club, season and competition
Club	Season	League			National cup (Note: Includes KNVB Cup, Copa do Brasil)		Continental		Total	
Club	Season	Division	Apps	Goals	Apps	Goals	Apps	Goals	Apps	Goals
Deportivo Quito	1997	Ecuadorian Serie A	27	1	–				27	1
Deportivo Quito	1998	Ecuadorian Serie A	28	1	–		6	0	34	1
Deportivo Quito	1999	Ecuadorian Serie A	39	0	–				39	0
Deportivo Quito	2000	Ecuadorian Serie A	31	2	–				31	2
Deportivo Quito	2001	Ecuadorian Serie A	35	4	–				35	4
Deportivo Quito	2002	Ecuadorian Serie A	33	10	–				33	10
Deportivo Quito	Total		193	18	0	0	6	0	199	18
El Nacional	2003	Ecuadorian Serie A	34	3	–		6	0	40	3
Deportivo Irapuato	2003–04	Mexican Primera División	16	5	–				16	5
Santos Laguna	2004–05	Mexican Primera División	14	2	–				14	2
LDU Quito	2005	Ecuadorian Serie A	42	4	–		14	3	56	7
LDU Quito	2006	Ecuadorian Serie A	18	2	–		10	3	28	5
LDU Quito	Total		60	6	0	0	24	6	84	12
PSV	2006–07	Eredivisie	26	5	0	0	9	1	35	6
PSV	2007–08	Eredivisie	20	1	1	0	6	0	27	1
PSV	2008–09	Eredivisie	26	3	1	0	6	0	33	3
PSV	Total		72	9	2	0	21	1	95	10
LDU Quito	2009	Ecuadorian Serie A	8	0	–		10	7	18	7
LDU Quito	2010	Ecuadorian Serie A	15	6	–		0	0	15	6
LDU Quito	Total		23	6	0	0	10	7	33	13
Atlético Mineiro	2010	Série A	9	0			3	0	12	0
Emelec	2011	Ecuadorian Serie A	35	5	–		3	0	38	5
LDU Quito	2012	Ecuadorian Serie A	19	1	–				19	1
LDU Quito	2013	Ecuadorian Serie A	28	5	–		0	0	28	5
LDU Quito	Total		47	6	0	0	0	0	47	6
Santa Fe	2014	Categoría Primera A	10	0	0	0	8	1	18	1
El Nacional	2015	Ecuadorian Serie A	22	4	–				22	4
Career total			535	64	2	0	81	15	618	79

=== International ===
Appearances and goals by national team and year
National team	Year	Apps	Goals
Ecuador	2000	4	0
Ecuador	2001	13	2
Ecuador	2002	13	1
Ecuador	2003	10	1
Ecuador	2004	11	3
Ecuador	2005	8	3
Ecuador	2006	9	0
Ecuador	2007	12	3
Ecuador	2008	3	1
Ecuador	2009	8	1
Ecuador	2010	0	0
Ecuador	2011	13	2
Ecuador	2012	1	0
Ecuador	2013	2	0
Ecuador	2014	4	1
Total		111	18

Scores and results list Ecuador's goal tally first, score column indicates score after each Méndez goal.

List of international goals scored by Édison Méndez
No.	Date	Venue	Opponent	Score	Result	Competition
1	2 June 2001	Estadio Monumental "U", Lima, Peru	Peru	1–1	2–1	2002 FIFA World Cup qualification
2	17 July 2001	Estadio Metropolitano Roberto Meléndez, Barranquilla, Colombia	Venezuela	3–0	4–0	2001 Copa América
3	13 June 2002	International Stadium Yokohama, Yokohama, Japan	Croatia	1–0	1–0	2002 FIFA World Cup
4	15 November 2003	Estadio Defensores del Chaco, Asunción, Paraguay	Paraguay	1–1	1–2	2006 FIFA World Cup qualification
5	10 March 2004	Estadio Víctor Manuel Reyna, Tuxtla Gutiérrez, Mexico	Mexico	1–2	1–2	Friendly
6	10 October 2004	Estadio Olímpico Atahualpa, Quito, Ecuador	Chile	2–0	2–0	2006 FIFA World Cup qualification
7	17 November 2004	Estadio Olímpico Atahualpa, Quito, Ecuador	Brazil	1–0	1–0	2006 FIFA World Cup qualification
8	27 March 2005	Estadio Olímpico Atahualpa, Quito, Ecuador	Paraguay	2–2	5–2	2006 FIFA World Cup qualification
9	27 March 2005	Estadio Olímpico Atahualpa, Quito, Ecuador	Paraguay	3–2	5–2	2006 FIFA World Cup qualification
10	4 May 2005	Giants Stadium, East Rutherford, United States	Paraguay	1–0	1–0	Friendly
11	1 July 2007	Estadio Monumental de Maturín, Maturín, Venezuela	Mexico	1–2	1–2	2007 Copa América
12	21 November 2007	Estadio Olímpico Atahualpa, Quito, Ecuador	Peru	3–0	5–1	2010 FIFA World Cup qualification
13	21 November 2007	Estadio Olímpico Atahualpa, Quito, Ecuador	Peru	5–0	5–1	2010 FIFA World Cup qualification
14	6 September 2008	Estadio Olímpico Atahualpa, Quito, Ecuador	Bolivia	2–1	3–1	2010 FIFA World Cup qualification
15	9 September 2009	Estadio Hernando Siles, La Paz, Bolivia	Bolivia	1–0	3–1	2010 FIFA World Cup qualification
16	10 August 2011	Estadio Ricardo Saprissa Aymá, San José, Costa Rica	Costa Rica	2–0	2–0	Friendly
17	15 November 2011	Estadio Olímpico Atahualpa, Quito, Ecuador	Peru	1–0	2–0	2014 FIFA World Cup qualification
18	5 March 2014	The Den, London, England	Australia	4–3	4–3	Friendly

== Honours ==
LDU Quito

- Serie A: 2005 Apertura, 2010
- Copa Sudamericana: 2009

PSV Eindhoven

- Eredivisie: 2006–07, 2007–08

== See also ==
- List of men's footballers with 100 or more international caps
