= Giovanny Pérez =

Venezuelan footballer (1974–2022)

Personal information
- Full name: Giovanny Leonardo Pérez Fernández
- Date of birth: 14 October 1974
- Place of birth: San Cristóbal, Venezuela
- Date of death: 26 June 2022 (aged 47)
- Height: 1.74 m (5 ft 9 in)
- Position: Midfielder

Senior career*
Years	Team	Apps	(Gls)
1996	Deportivo Pasto		
1997	Lanceros		
1997–1998	UA Táchira		
1998–1999	ULA Maracaibo		
1999–2002	ItalChacao	38	(0)
2002–2003	Estudiantes de Mérida		
2003–2004	Maracaibo	33	(0)
2004–2005	Deportivo Táchira		(9)
2005–2006	Caracas FC		(0)
2007–2010	Zamora		

International career
1997–2007	Venezuela	30	(0)

Managerial career
- 2017: Atlético Socopó
- 2019: Deportivo Táchira
- * Club domestic league appearances and goals

Giovanny Leonardo Pérez Fernández (14 October 1974 – 26 June 2022) was a Venezuelan football player and coach. A midfielder, he made 30 appearances for the Venezuela national team between 1997 and 2007. He coached Deportivo Táchira.

== Career ==
Pérez started his professional playing career at Deportivo Pasto in Colombia.

On 3 December 2019, the Deportivo Tachira press department announced him as the club's new head coach for the upcoming 2019 Venezuelan Primera División season, until the end of the season.

== Death ==
Pérez died on 26 June 2022, at the age of 47.
