= Rodrigo Valenzuela =

Chilean footballer (born 1975)

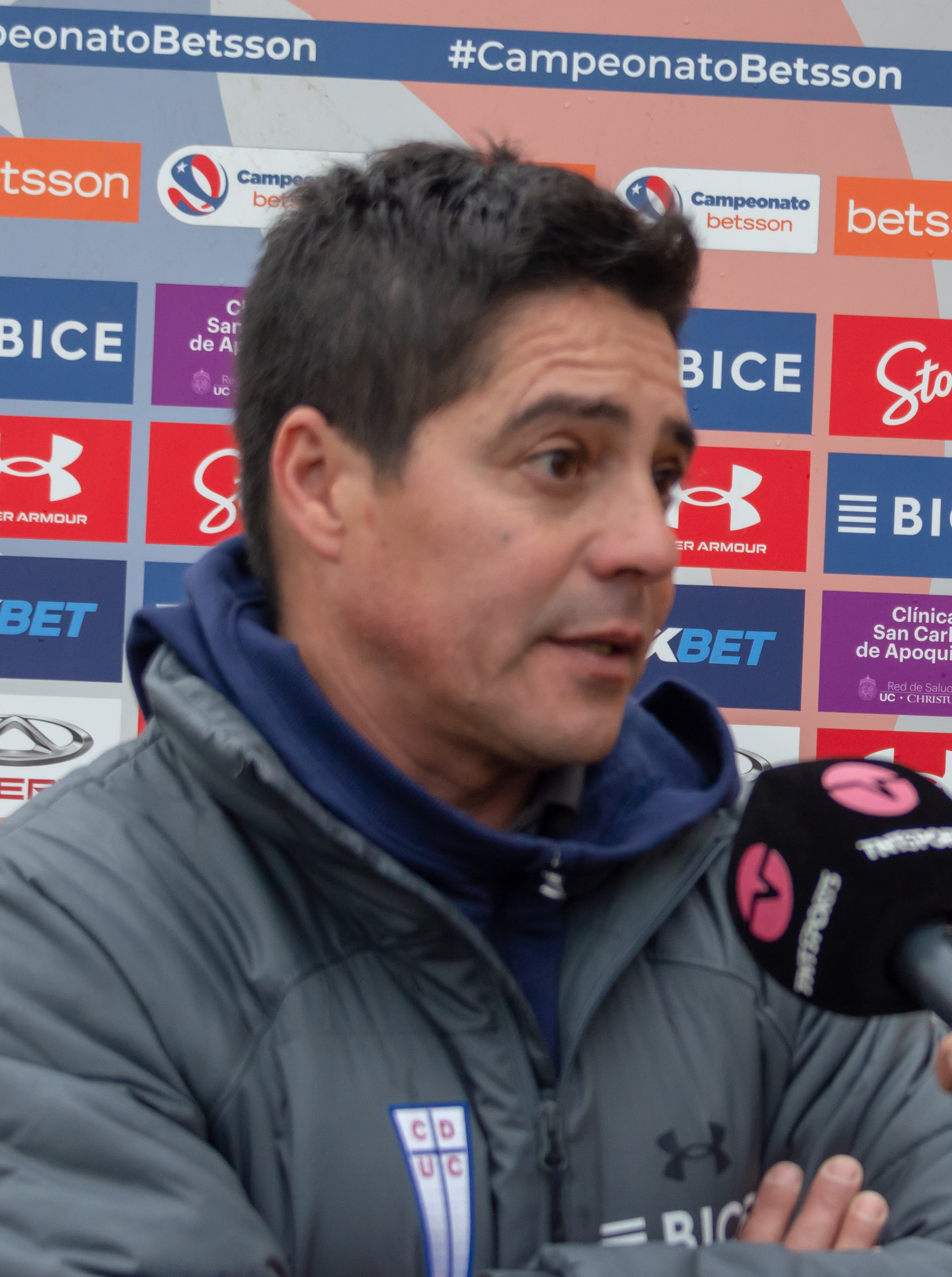

Personal information
- Full name: Rodrigo Ignacio Valenzuela Avilés
- Date of birth: 27 November 1975 (age 50)
- Place of birth: Santiago, Chile
- Height: 1.64 m (5 ft 5 in)
- Positions: Defensive midfielder; left midfielder

Team information
- Current team: Universidad Católica (assistant)

Youth career
- 1988−1993: Unión Española

Senior career*
Years	Team	Apps	(Gls)
1994–1997	Unión Española	107	(20)
1998–1999	América	27	(2)
2000	Lobos UAP	–	(–)
2000	Unión Española	–	(–)
2001	Universitario	0	(0)
2001	Santiago Wanderers	14	(0)
2002	León	33	(5)
2002–2004	Atlas	72	(4)
2004–2005	América	32	(0)
2005	Unión Española	9	(1)
2006	Veracruz	17	(0)
2006	Universidad de Chile	15	(0)
2007−2014	Universidad Católica	174	(6)
Total		500	(38)

International career
1998	Chile B	1	(0)
1998−2005	Chile	18	(0)

Managerial career
- 2021–: Universidad Católica (assistant)
- 2022: Universidad Católica (interim)
- 2023: Universidad Católica (interim)
- 2024: Universidad Católica (interim)
- 2025: Universidad Católica (interim)
Medal record
Men's football
- * Club domestic league appearances and goals

Rodrigo Ignacio Valenzuela Avilés (born 27 November 1975) is a Chilean football coach and former player. He is the current assistant manager of Universidad Católica.

== Club career ==
He is a midfielder who played for Universidad Católica. He has spent his entire career in club teams in either Chile or Mexico. He has played for Atlas, Club América and CD Veracruz in the Primera División de Mexico.

== International career ==
He played for the international team since his debut against England on February 11, 1998. Prior to this, he played for Chile B against England B on February 10, 1998. Chile won by 2-1. He was part of the Chilean squad whicthatticipated in the 2004 Copa América.

== Managerial statistics ==
As of matches played 28 April 2022

Managerial Record by team and tenure
Team	Nat.	From	To	Record								Ref
Team	Nat.	From	To	G	W	D	L	GF	GA	GD	Win %	Ref
Universidad Católica (interim)	(Chile)	19 April 2022	8 May 2022	2	0	1	1	3	4	−1	0.00	
Total				2	0	1	1	3	4	−1	0.00	—

== Honours ==
Santiago Wanderers

- Chilean Primera División: 2001

América

- Torneo Clausura: 2005

Universidad Católica

- Chilean Primera División: 2010
- Copa Chile: 2011
