= Juan Carlos Burbano =

Ecuadorian footballer and manager (born 1969)

Personal information
- Full name: Juan Carlos Burbano de Lara Torres
- Date of birth: 15 February 1969 (age 57)
- Place of birth: Quito, Ecuador
- Height: 1.69 m (5 ft 7 in)
- Position: Midfielder

Senior career*
| Years | Team | Apps | (Gls) |
| 1988–1991 | Universidad Católica | | |
| 1992–1993 | Deportivo Quito | | |
| 1994–2004 | El Nacional | | |

International career
| 1996–2002 | Ecuador | 18 | (0) |

Managerial career
- 2009–2009: El Nacional
- * Club domestic league appearances and goals

Juan Carlos Burbano de Lara Torres (born 15 February 1969) is a former Ecuadorian footballer who is the interim manager of El Nacional in Quito.

== Club career ==
Burbano played for a few clubs, including Deportivo Quito and El Nacional.

== International career ==
Burbano made 18 appearances for the senior Ecuador national football team from 1996 to 2002, and was a participant at the 2002 FIFA World Cup.

== Career as manager ==
Burbano was appointed interim manager of El Nacional following the dismissal of Jorge Célico at the start of the 2009 season.
