= Augusto Poroso =

Ecuadorian footballer (born 1974)

Personal information
- Full name: Augusto Jesús Poroso Caicedo
- Date of birth: April 13, 1974 (age 52)
- Place of birth: Guayaquil, Ecuador
- Height: 1.83 m (6 ft 0 in)
- Position: Defender

Senior career*
Years	Team	Apps	(Gls)
1993–2004	Emelec		
2005	Barcelona		
2006	Aucas		
2007	Alianza Lima		
2007	El Nacional		
2008	Macará		

International career
1999–2004	Ecuador	38	(1)
- * Club domestic league appearances and goals

Augusto Jesús Poroso Caicedo (born 13 April 1974) is an Ecuadorian football (soccer) defender who played for Club Social y Deportivo Macará.

== Club career ==
He played mostly for CS Emelec. He also played for the Peruvian soccer club Alianza Lima.

== International career ==
Poroso played for the Ecuador national football team and was a participant at the 2002 FIFA World Cup.

=== International goals ===
Scores and results list Ecuador's goal tally first.

No	Date	Venue	Opponent	Score	Result	Competition
1.	22 October 2004	June 11 Stadium, Tripoli, Libya	Nigeria	2–1	2–2	2004 LG Cup

== Honours ==
=== Club ===
- Club Sport Emelec
  - Serie A de Ecuador: 1993, 1994, 2001, 2002
