= Sixto Vizuete =

Ecuadorian football manager (born 1961)

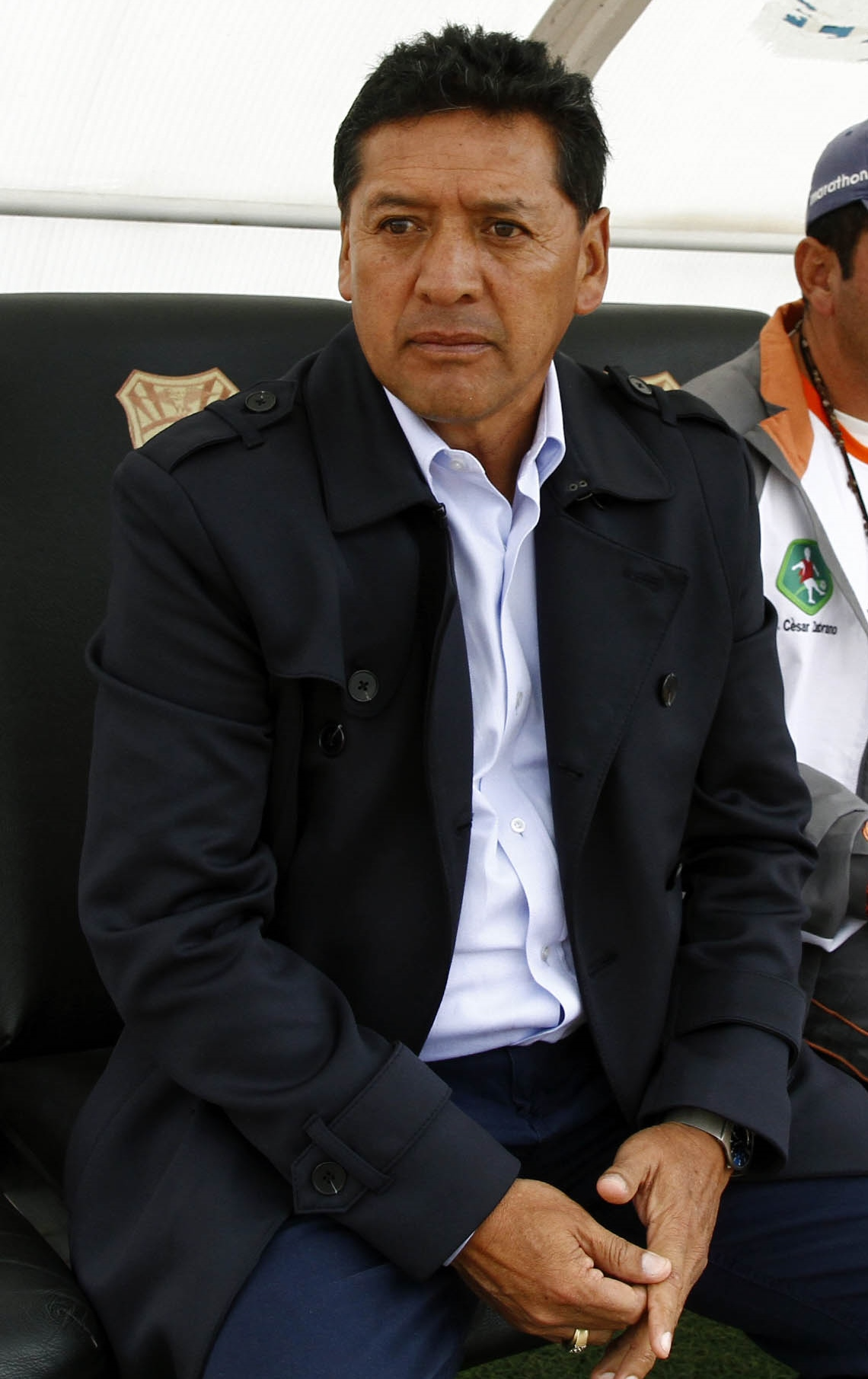
- Vizuete in 2015

Personal information
- Full name: Sixto Rafael Vizuete Toapanta
- Date of birth: 13 January 1961 (age 65)
- Place of birth: Guaytacama, Latacunga Canton, Ecuador

Senior career*
| Years | Team | Apps | (Gls) |
- Deportivo Cotopaxi

Managerial career
- 2007: Ecuador U17
- 2007–2010: Ecuador
- 2010–2012: Ecuador U20
- 2012–2013: El Nacional
- 2013: Imbabura
- 2014: Ecuador U20
- 2014–2015: Ecuador
- 2015: Mushuc Runa
- 2016: Imbabura
- 2016: Quito
- 2016: ESPOLI
- 2017: Imbabura
- 2018–2019: Bolivia U20
- 2020: Aampetra
- 2021: Juventud
- 2022: Aampetra
- 2025: Aampetra
- 2026: Olmedo
- 2026: The Strongest
Medal record
Representing Ecuador
Men's Football
Pan American Games
| Gold medal – first place | 2007 Rio de Janeiro | Team competition |
- * Club domestic league appearances and goals

Sixto Rafael Vizuete Toapanta (born 13 January 1961) is the Ecuadorian football manager.

== Early career ==
He played for Deportivo Cotopaxi which at that time was promoted to the first division in Ecuador. After his footballing career, he attended University of Leipzig.

== Coaching career ==
From 1992 to 1995 he was in charge of many small local sides in Ecuador, until he began to coach the youth ranks of Club Deportivo ESPOLI of Quito in 1996. He made a change however when the Federación Ecuatoriana de Fútbol designated him the coach of the Ecuador U-17 side. Failing to qualify for the 2007 U-17 World Cup, he made up for it by giving Ecuador their first title in their footballing history: they defeated Jamaica in the final of the 2007 Pan American Games to win the gold medal.

=== Ecuador national team ===
He was appointed interim coach of the Ecuador national team on November 18, 2007 following Luis Fernando Suarez's irrevocable decision to resign. At that time, Ecuador had lost all three of their 2010 World Cup qualifiers which prompted Suarez's resignation. Vizuete gave Ecuador their first qualifying win in his first match as manager, thumping rivals Peru 5-1. This caused the majority of Ecuadorians to trust him, and on 26 February 2008, he was appointed official coach of the national side. Ecuador played its first game with Vizuete as head coach on 26 March 2008 against Haiti, defeating them 3-1.On October 15, 2009, Chile defeated Ecuador in World Cup Qualifying for South Africa 2010 1-0 under Vizuete, Ecuador didn't qualify. But, on February 12, 2011, Vizuete qualified Ecuador's U-20 national team to the Fifa U-20 World cup in Colombia this summer.

=== El Nacional ===
In April 2012, Vizuete was named the manager of Ecuadorian-club El Nacional after the departure of Mario Saralegui the day before.
