= Raúl Guerrón =

Ecuadorian footballer (1976–2026)

Personal information
- Full name: Raúl Fernando Guerrón Méndez
- Date of birth: 12 October 1976
- Place of birth: Atuntaqui, Imbabura, Ecuador
- Date of death: 1 June 2026 (aged 49)
- Place of death: Quito, Pichincha, Ecuador
- Height: 1.84 m (6 ft 0 in)
- Position: Defender

Senior career*
Years	Team	Apps	(Gls)
1994–2008	Deportivo Quito		
1998	→ Universidad Católica (loan)		
2005	→ Barcelona de Guayaquil (loan)		
2008	Universidad Católica		

International career
2000–2004	Ecuador	34	(0)
- * Club domestic league appearances and goals

Raúl Fernando Guerrón Méndez (12 October 1976 – 1 June 2026) was an Ecuadorian professional footballer who played as a defender. He spent most of his career with Deportivo Quito.

== Biography ==
Guerrón played for the Ecuador national team and was a participant at the 2002 FIFA World Cup.

He was the older brother of Ecuador international footballers Joffre Guerrón and Hugo Guerrón.

Guerrón died on 1 June 2026 in Quito, at the age of 49, having suffered from stomach cancer.

== Sources ==
- RSSSF
