= Mirko Jozić =

Croatian footballer and manager

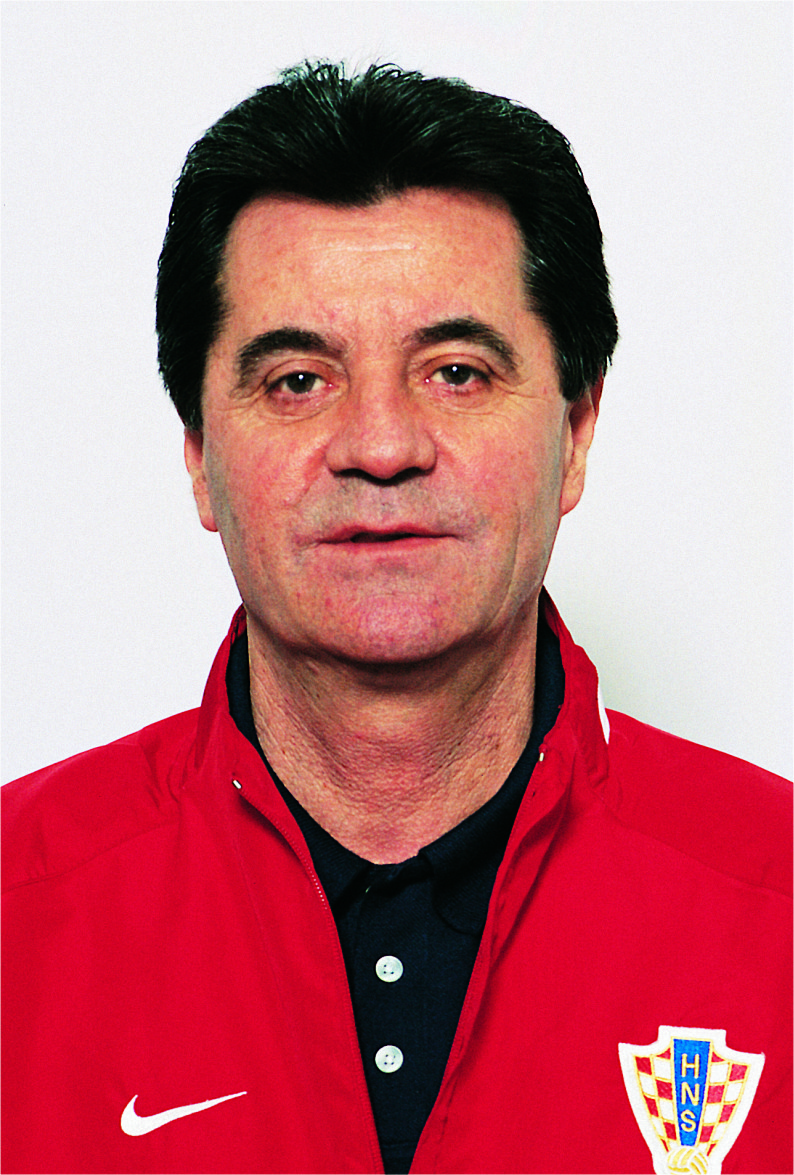
- Jozić while as Croatia manager in 2000

Personal information
- Full name: Mirko Jozić
- Date of birth: 8 April 1940 (age 86)
- Place of birth: Trilj, Kingdom of Yugoslavia
- Position: Midfielder

Senior career*
Years	Team	Apps	(Gls)
- Tekstilac Derventa
- RNK Split
- Belišće
- Junak Sinj

Managerial career
- 1970–1972: Junak Sinj
- 1972–1988: Yugoslavia (youth)
- 1988–1990: Colo-Colo (youth)
- 1990–1993: Colo-Colo
- 1994–1995: Chile
- 1995: Club América
- 1995–1996: Hajduk Split
- 1996–1997: Al Hilal
- 1998: Newell's Old Boys
- 1998–1999: Sporting CP
- 1999–2000: Croatia U-21
- 2000–2002: Croatia
- 2005–2006: Colo-Colo (director)
- 2006–2007: Dinamo Zagreb (youth)
Medal record
Head Coach for Yugoslavia
Winner	FIFA U-20 World Cup	1987
- * Club domestic league appearances and goals

Mirko Jozić (Croatian pronunciation: [mǐːrko jǒːzitɕ]; born 8 April 1940) is a Croatian retired professional football manager and player.

== Managerial career ==
As manager, he won the 1987 FIFA World Youth Championship in Chile with the Yugoslavia under-20 national team composed of famous names such as Robert Jarni, Igor Štimac, Zvonimir Boban, Robert Prosinečki and Davor Šuker. He coached Chilean side Colo-Colo between 1989 and 1993, winning the Copa Libertadores in 1991. Jozić is the first European to have won the Copa Libertadores.

He led the Croatia national team at the 2002 FIFA World Cup.

== Managerial statistics ==
Team	From	To	Record				
Team	From	To	G	W	D	L	Win %
Colo-Colo	1990	1993	134	83	38	13	61.94
Chile	1 July 1994	30 June 1995	8	3	2	3	37.50
Club América	1995	1995	7	1	5	1	14.29
Hajduk Split	1 November 1995	31 May 1996	20	13	3	4	65.00
Sporting CP	1 July 1998	30 June 1999	37	17	12	8	45.95
Croatia	October 2000	July 2002	18	9	6	3	50.00
Total			223	126	66	31	56.50

== Honours ==
=== Clubs ===
Junak Sinj

- Yugoslav Third League: 1970–71

Colo-Colo

- Primera División (3): 1990, 1991, 1993
- Copa Apertura (1): 1990
- Copa Libertadores (1): 1991
- Copa Interamericana (1): 1991
- Recopa Sudamericana (1): 1992

Al Hilal

- Asian Cup Winners' Cup (1): 1996–97

=== National team ===
Yugoslavia U-20

- FIFA World Youth Championship: 1987

=== Individual ===
- HNS's Trophy Trophies: 1984
- Matija Ljubek Award: 2011

== Orders ==
- Order of Danica Hrvatska with face of Franjo Bučar - 1995
