= Luis Chiriboga =

Ecuadorian football executive

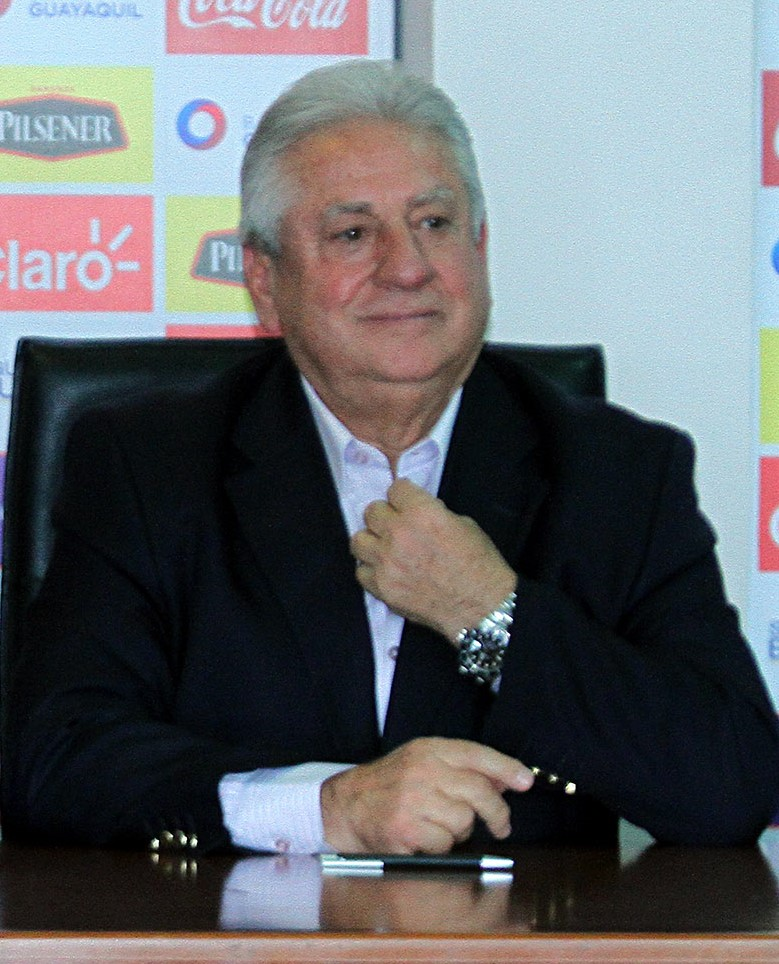
Luis portrait

Luis Chiriboga Acosta (born October 6, 1946) is an Ecuadorian businessman, civil engineer and sports administrator. He is the former President of the Ecuadorian Football Federation (FEF), a former member of the CONMEBOL Executive Committee and a former FIFA standing committee member.

== Early life and education ==
Chiriboga was born in Riobamba. He graduated from the Central University of Ecuador as a civil engineer.

== FIFA's fraud case ==
In 2015, Chiriboga was indicted with two others of money-laundering. He was also found to have accepted bribes from various media companies, and was banned for life by FIFA from football-related activities. In addition, a fine of 1 million Swiss francs was imposed.
