= Juan Aguinaga =

Ecuadorian footballer (born 1978)

Personal information
- Full name: Juan Francisco Aguinaga Garzón
- Date of birth: January 4, 1978 (age 48)
- Place of birth: Quito, Pichincha, Ecuador
- Height: 1.73 m (5 ft 8 in)
- Position: Midfielder

Team information
- Current team: Universidad Católica (Ecuador)

Senior career*
Years	Team	Apps	(Gls)
1997–2002	Espoli	151	(26)
2003	Deportivo Cuenca	40	(4)
2004	Barcelona Sporting Club	4	(0)
2005	El Nacional	17	(0)
2006–2007	Aucas		
2008–2009	Universidad Católica	21	(3)

International career
2001–2003	Ecuador		
- * Club domestic league appearances and goals as of July 2008

Juan Francisco Aguinaga Garzón (born 4 January 1978) is an Ecuadorian football midfielder.

== International career ==
He was a member of the Ecuador national football team at the 2001 Copa América.
