= Juan José (given name) =

Juan José is a Spanish given name. Some people with the name: JJ is its nickname.

== A ==
- Juan José Aguirre (born 1954), Spanish Catholic bishop
- Juan Jose Aizcorbe Torra (born 1959), Spanish politician and lawyer
- Juan José Albornoz (born 1982), Chilean football midfielder
- Juan José Alvarado (1798–1857), Honduran Supreme Director
- Juan José Alvear (born 1941), Spanish field hockey player
- Juan José Amador (born 1998), Colombian cyclist
- Juan José Aramburu (born 1981), Spanish skeet shooter
- Juan José Aranguren (born 1954), Argentine businessman
- Juan José Arbolí y Acaso (1795–1863), Spanish priest
- Juan José Arévalo (1904–1990), Guatemalan statesman and professor of philosophy
- Juan José Arraya (born 1986), Argentine football striker
- Juan José Arreola (1918–2001), Mexican writer, academic, and actor
  - Statue of Juan José Arreola, installed along the Rotonda de los Jaliscienses Ilustres, Guadalajara, Jalisco
- Juan José Astorquia (1876–1905), Spanish footballer and sports leader

== B ==
- José Juan Bárcenas (born 1961), Mexican politician
- Juan José Ballesta (born 1987), Spanish actor
- Juan José Barros (born 1989), Colombian-born Peruvian former footballer
- Juan José Beníquez (born 1950), Puerto Rican former Baseball player
- Juan José Blanco (born 1985), Uruguayan retired football player
- Juan José Borrelli (born 1970), Argentine former footballer

== C ==
- Juan José Cabezudo (c. 1800 – c. 1860), Afro-Peruvian cook
- Juan José Cáceres (born 2000), Argentine professional footballer
- Juan José Caicedo (born 1992), Ecuadorian discus thrower
- Juan José Calandria (1902–1980), Uruguayan painter and sculptor
- Juan José Calero (born 1998), Colombian footballer
- Juan José Calderón (born 1991), Mexican former professional footballer
- Juan José Camero (born 1943), Argentine film, television, and theatre actor
- Juan José Campanella (born 1959), Argentine television and film director, writer, and producer
- Juan José Cañas, several people
- Juan José Carbó (1927–2010), Spanish cartoonist and one of the great masters of Spanish comics
- Juan José Carrillo (1842–1916), Californio politician and judge
- Juan José Cartagena (c. 1815 – c. 1895), Puerto Rican politician and Mayor of Ponce
- Juan José Castelli (1764–1812), Argentine lawyer
- Juan José Castilla (born 1945), Mexican modern pentathlete
- Juan José Castillo, several people
- Juan José Castro (1895–1968), Argentine composer and conductor
- Juan Jose Chuquisengo, Peruvian concert pianist and soloist
- Juan José Cobo (born 1981), Spanish retired professional road racing cyclist
- Juan José Collantes (born 1983), Spanish former professional footballer
- Juan José Colomer (born 1966), Spanish composer
- José Juan Cotto (born 1977), Puerto Rican retired professional boxer
- Juan José Creagh (1765–1829), Spanish army officer
- Juan José Cuadros Pérez (1926–1990), Spanish writer of poetry and prose
- Juan José Cuevas García (born 1965), Mexican politician

== D ==
- Juan José Daboub, American chairman and CEO
- Juan José de Amézaga (1881–1956), Uruguayan politician and 28th President of Uruguay
- Juan José de Aycinena y Piñol (1792–1865), Guatemalan ecclesiastical and intellectual conservative
- Juan José de los Ángeles (born 1973), Spanish former professional road cyclist
- Juan José de Jesús Yas (1846–1917), Japanese-born photographer
- Juan José de Sámano y Uribarri (1753–1821), Spanish military officer
- Juan José de Vértiz y Salcedo (1719–1799), Spanish colonial politician
- Juan José Díaz Infante Núñez (1936–2012), Mexican architect and industrial designer
- Juan José Domenchina (1898–1959), Spanish poet and literary critic

== E ==
- Juan José Eguiara y Eguren (1696–1763), Mexican Catholic scholar and bishop
- Juan José Elguézabal (1781–1840), Spanish and Mexican soldier
- Juan José Elhuyar (1754–1796), Spanish chemist and mineralogist
- Juan José Esparragoza Moreno (1949–2014), Mexican drug lord and co-founder of the Sinaloa Cartel
- Juan José Estella (born 1956), Spanish footballer
- Juan José Estrada (1872–1967), President of Nicaragua
- Juan José Estrada (boxer) (1963–2015), Mexican professional boxer

== F ==
- Juan José Falcón Sanabria (born 1936), Spanish conductor and composer
- Juan José Ferraro (1923–1973), Argentine footballer
- Juan José Flores (1800–1864), Venezuelan-born military general
- Juan José Florian (born c. 1982), Colombian para cyclist
- Juan José Fuertes Martínez (born 1976), Spanish S5 swimmer with cerebral palsy

== G ==
- Juan José Gallo (1924–2003), Chilean basketball player
- Juan José Gámez (1939—1997), Costa Rican football player and manager
- Juan Jose García (born 1989), Dominican professional basketball player
- Juan José García Ochoa (born 1969), Mexican politician
- Juan José Gerardi Conedera (1922–1998), Guatemalan Roman Catholic bishop and human rights defender
- Juan José Giambiagi (1924–1996), Argentine theoretical physicist
- Juan José Gómez (born 1980), Salvadoran retired professional goalkeeper
- Juan José Gómez Camacho (born 1964), Mexican diplomat
- Juan José Govea (born 1991), Ecuadorian international footballer
- Juan José Güemes, Spanish politician
- Juan José Guesi, soldier who fought in the Argentine Civil Wars
- Juan José Guerra Abud (born 1952), Mexican entrepreneur and politician
- Juan José Gurruchaga (born 1977), Chilean television actor
- Juan José Gutiérrez Mayorga (born 1958), Guatemalan businessman, professional road racing cyclist, and track cyclist
- Juan José Guzmán (1797–1847), the first President of El Salvador

== H ==
- Juan José Haedo (born 1981), Argentine former

== I ==
- Juan José Ibarretxe (born 1957), former president of the Basque Autonomous Community
- Juan José Imbroda (born 1944), Spanish politician
- Juan José Imhoff (born 1988), former Argentine professional rugby union player

== J ==
- Juan José Jayo (born 1973), Peruvian football manager
- Juan José Jusid (born 1941), Argentine film director and screenwriter

== L ==
- Juan José Latorre (1846–1912), Chilean Vice Admiral
- Juan José León Rubio, former Governor of Aguascalientes
- Juan José Lerena y Barry (1796—1863), Spanish naval captain
- Juan José Linz (1926–2013), German-born Spanish sociologist and political scientist
- Juan José Lobato (born 1988), Spanish former professional road racing cyclist
- Juan José Longhini (born 1984), Argentine former footballer
- Juan José López (born 1950), Argentine football manager and former player
- Juan José López-Ibor (1906–1991), Spanish psychiatrist
- Juan José Lozano (born 1955), Spanish former footballer
- Juan José Lucas (born 1944), Spanish attorney, professor, and politician
- José Juan Luque (born 1977), Spanish footballer
- Juan José Luvera (born 1980), Argentine football manager

== M ==
- Juan José Madrigal (born 1974), Costa Rican former swimmer
- Juan José Maglio (1904–1964), Argentine professional football player
- Juan José Mantecón (1895–1964), Spanish composer
- Juan José Maqueda (born 1969), Spanish retired footballer
- Juan José Marino, Mexican film editor
- Juan José Martí (c. 1570–1604), Spanish novelist
- Juan José Medina, President of the Provisional Junta of Paraguay
- Juan José Medina Lamela, the 19th Puerto Rico Adjutant General
- Juan José Méndez (born 1964), Spanish cyclist
- Juan José Mencía (1923–2012), Spanish footballer
- Juan José Mieza (1915–1999), Spanish footballer
- Juan José Míguez (1918–1995), Argentine actor
- Juan José Millás (born 1946), Spanish writer
- Juan José Mina (born 2004), Colombian footballer
- Juan José Muñoz (1950–2013), Argentine businessman
- Juan José Montes (born 1989), Mexican professional boxer
- Juan José Moral (born 1951), Spanish former racing cyclist
- Juan José Morales (born 1982), Argentine former professional footballer
- Juan José Morosoli (1899–1957), Uruguayan writer
- Juan José Mosalini (1943–2022), Argentine bandoneon player
- Juan José Muñante (1948–2019), Peruvian footballer

== N ==
- Juan José Narváez Solarte (born 1995), Colombian footballer
- José Juan Navarro (born 1981), Spanish weightlifter
- Juan José Navarro, 1st Marquess of Victoria (1687–1772), Spanish military officer
- Juan José Nieto Gil (1804–1866), Colombian politician, Army general, and writer
- Juan José Nogués (1909–1998), Spanish Aragonese footballer and manager

== O ==
- Juan José Omella (born 1946), Spanish prelate
- Juan José Oré (born 1954), Peruvian football manager
- Juan José Oroz (born 1980), Spanish former professional road bicycle racer
- Juan José Ortega (1904–1996), Mexican film director, producer, and screenwriter
- Juan José Ossa (born 1979), Chilean lawyer and politician
- Juan José Ossandón (born 1977), Chilean former footballer

== P ==
- Juan José Pacho (born 1963), Mexican former baseball player and manager
- Juan José Padilla (born 1973), Spanish torero
- Juan José Palomino Jiménez (1895—1977), Spanish entrepreneur and politician
- Juan José Paso (1758–1833), Argentine politician
- Juan José Paz (born 1980), Bolivian judoka
- Juan José Pedro Carrera (1782—1818), Chilean soldier and patriot
- Juan José Perea (born 2000), Colombian professional footballer
- Juan José Pérez (born 2004), Colombian footballer
- Juan José Pérez Hernández (1725–1775), 18th-century Spanish explorer
- Juan José Petit (1896–1984), Spanish footballer
- Juan José Piro, Honduran swimmer
- Juan José Pizzuti (1927–2020), Argentine football player and manager
- Juan José Plans (1943–2014), Spanish writer, journalist, and radio and television announcer
- Juan José Porta, Argentine stage and film actor
- Juan José Potous (ca. 1845 – ca. 1920), Puerto Rican politician and Mayor of Ponce
- Juan José Pujana (1943-2022), Spanish politician

== Q ==
- Juan José Quesada (1790–1832), Argentine colonel

== R ==
- Juan José Ribera (born 1980), Chilean football manager
- Juan José Rodríguez (born 1967), Costa Rican retired football player
- Juan José Rodríguez Prats (born 1946), Mexican lawyer and politician
- Juan José Rodríguez Pérez, Puerto Rican politician and former mayor of Ciales
- Juan José Roman (born 1962), Spanish sprint canoeer
- José Juan Romero (born 1974), Spanish professional football manager
- Juan José Rosón (1932–1986), Spanish politician
- Juan José Ryp (born 1971), Spanish comic book artist

== S ==
- Juan José Sabines (born 1968), Mexican politician
- Juan José Saer (1937–2005), Argentine writer
- Juan José Sagarduy (1941–2010), Spanish professional cyclist
- Juan José Salvador (born 1975), Spanish volleyball player
- José Juan Santesteban (1809–1884), Basque composer
- Juan José Saravia (born 1969), Mexican cinematographer
- Juan José Sebreli (1930–2024), Argentine sociologist, essayist, and philosopher
- Juan José Sicre (1898–1974), Cuban sculptor
- Juan José Soto (born 1998), Dominican professional baseball outfielder
- Juan José Suárez Coppel, Mexican economist

== T ==
- José Juan Tablada (1871–1945), Mexican poet, art critic, and diplomat
- Juan José Tamayo (born 1946), Spanish theologian and professor of theology
- Juan José Timón (1937–2001), Uruguayan cyclist
- Juan José Torres (1920–1976), Bolivian socialist politician and military leader
- Juan José Torres (athlete) (born 1957), Spanish middle-distance runner
- Juan José Tramutola (1902—1968), Argentine football coach
- Juan José Trillo (1909–unknown), Argentine boxer

== U ==
- Juan José Ubaldo (born 1979), Dominican boxer
- Juan José Ulloa Solares (1827–1888), Costa Rican politician
- Juan José Uría (born 1956), Spanish former handball player
- Juan José Urquizu (1901–1982), Spanish football player and manager
- Juan José Urráburu (1844–1904), Spanish Jesuit and a scholastic philosopher
- Juan José Urruti (born 1962), Argentine former footballer

== V ==
- Juan José Valle (1896–1956), Argentine general
- José Juan Vázquez (born 1988), Mexican former professional footballer
- Juan José Veloz (born 1982), Mexican Olympic and national record-holding swimmer
- Juan José Viamonte (1774–1843), Argentine general
- Juan José Videgain (born 1975), Spanish writer, actor, and director

== W ==
- Juan José Warner (1807–1890), American-Mexican naturalized citizen
- Juan José Wedel (1944–2013), Costa Rican archer

== Z ==
- Juan José Zúñiga (born 1968), former Bolivian Army officer

== See also ==
- Juan José (disambiguation)
- Juan José Castelli, Chaco, a town in the province of Chaco, Argentina
- Juan José Ríos, Sinaloa, an agricultural city located in Northern Sinaloa, Mexico
- Juan José Mora Municipality, one of the 14 municipalities of the Venezuelan state of Carabobo
- General Juan José Pérez Municipality, the first municipal section of the Bautista Saavedra Province in the La Paz Department, Bolivia
