= 2002 FIFA World Cup squads =

The 2002 FIFA World Cup was the 17th edition of the FIFA World Cup, an international association football competition that serves as the championship for men's national teams. It was held in Japan and South Korea from 31 May to 30 June and was contested by 32 teams. Each national association was required to name a provisional squad of 23 players, expanded from 22 in previous tournaments, by 21 May 2002.

The players' ages, caps and clubs are listed as of 31 May 2002, the opening day of the tournament. The oldest player was defender Jan Heintze of Denmark at 38 years, 293 days old; the youngest was Femi Opabunmi, a 17-year-old midfielder for Nigeria.

== Group A ==
=== Denmark ===
Head coach: Morten Olsen

No.	Pos.	Player	Date of birth (age)	Caps	Club
1	GK	Thomas Sørensen	12 June 1976 (aged 25)	14	(England) Sunderland
2	MF	Stig Tøfting	14 August 1969 (aged 32)	36	(England) Bolton Wanderers
3	DF	René Henriksen	27 August 1969 (aged 32)	39	(Greece) Panathinaikos
4	DF	Martin Laursen	26 July 1977 (aged 24)	15	(Italy) Milan
5	DF	Jan Heintze (c)	17 August 1963 (aged 38)	83	(Netherlands) PSV Eindhoven
6	DF	Thomas Helveg	24 June 1971 (aged 30)	67	(Italy) Milan
7	MF	Thomas Gravesen	11 March 1976 (aged 26)	22	(England) Everton
8	MF	Jesper Grønkjær	12 August 1977 (aged 24)	25	(England) Chelsea
9	FW	Jon Dahl Tomasson	29 August 1976 (aged 25)	38	(Netherlands) Feyenoord
10	MF	Martin Jørgensen	6 October 1975 (aged 26)	32	(Italy) Udinese
11	FW	Ebbe Sand	19 July 1972 (aged 29)	44	(Germany) Schalke 04
12	DF	Niclas Jensen	17 August 1974 (aged 27)	8	(England) Manchester City
13	DF	Steven Lustü	13 April 1971 (aged 31)	4	(Norway) Lyn
14	MF	Claus Jensen	29 April 1977 (aged 25)	13	(England) Charlton Athletic
15	MF	Jan Michaelsen	28 November 1970 (aged 31)	11	(Greece) Panathinaikos
16	GK	Peter Kjær	5 November 1965 (aged 36)	4	(Scotland) Aberdeen
17	MF	Christian Poulsen	28 February 1980 (aged 22)	3	(Denmark) Copenhagen
18	FW	Peter Løvenkrands	29 January 1980 (aged 22)	4	(Scotland) Rangers
19	MF	Dennis Rommedahl	22 July 1978 (aged 23)	19	(Netherlands) PSV Eindhoven
20	DF	Kasper Bøgelund	8 October 1980 (aged 21)	2	(Netherlands) PSV Eindhoven
21	FW	Peter Madsen	26 April 1978 (aged 24)	4	(Denmark) Brøndby
22	GK	Jesper Christiansen	24 April 1978 (aged 24)	0	(Denmark) Vejle
23	MF	Brian Steen Nielsen	28 December 1968 (aged 33)	65	(Sweden) Malmö

=== France ===
Head coach: Roger Lemerre

No.	Pos.	Player	Date of birth (age)	Caps	Club
1	GK	Ulrich Ramé	19 September 1972 (aged 29)	11	(France) Bordeaux
2	DF	Vincent Candela	24 October 1973 (aged 28)	36	(Italy) Roma
3	DF	Bixente Lizarazu	9 December 1969 (aged 32)	74	(Germany) Bayern Munich
4	MF	Patrick Vieira	23 June 1976 (aged 25)	52	(England) Arsenal
5	DF	Philippe Christanval	31 August 1978 (aged 23)	4	(Spain) Barcelona
6	MF	Youri Djorkaeff	9 March 1968 (aged 34)	79	(England) Bolton Wanderers
7	MF	Claude Makélélé	18 February 1973 (aged 29)	14	(Spain) Real Madrid
8	DF	Marcel Desailly (c)	7 September 1968 (aged 33)	93	(England) Chelsea
9	FW	Djibril Cissé	12 August 1981 (aged 20)	1	(France) Auxerre
10	MF	Zinedine Zidane	23 June 1972 (aged 29)	73	(Spain) Real Madrid
11	FW	Sylvain Wiltord	10 May 1974 (aged 28)	38	(England) Arsenal
12	FW	Thierry Henry	17 August 1977 (aged 24)	35	(England) Arsenal
13	DF	Mikaël Silvestre	9 August 1977 (aged 24)	10	(England) Manchester United
14	MF	Alain Boghossian	27 October 1970 (aged 31)	26	(Italy) Parma
15	DF	Lilian Thuram	1 January 1972 (aged 30)	73	(Italy) Juventus
16	GK	Fabien Barthez	28 June 1971 (aged 30)	47	(England) Manchester United
17	MF	Emmanuel Petit	22 September 1970 (aged 31)	57	(England) Chelsea
18	DF	Frank Leboeuf	22 January 1968 (aged 34)	47	(France) Marseille
19	DF	Willy Sagnol	18 March 1977 (aged 25)	9	(Germany) Bayern Munich
20	FW	David Trezeguet	15 October 1977 (aged 24)	36	(Italy) Juventus
21	FW	Christophe Dugarry	24 March 1972 (aged 30)	51	(France) Bordeaux
22	MF	Johan Micoud	24 July 1973 (aged 28)	14	(Italy) Parma
23	GK	Grégory Coupet	31 December 1972 (aged 29)	1	(France) Lyon

=== Senegal ===
Head coach: (France) Bruno Metsu

No.	Pos.	Player	Date of birth (age)	Caps	Club
1	GK	Tony Sylva	17 May 1975 (aged 27)	15	(France) Monaco
2	DF	Omar Daf	12 February 1977 (aged 25)	31	(France) Sochaux
3	MF	Pape Sarr	7 December 1977 (aged 24)	22	(France) Lens
4	DF	Pape Malick Diop	29 December 1974 (aged 27)	25	(France) Lorient
5	DF	Alassane N'Dour	12 December 1981 (aged 20)	7	(France) Saint-Étienne
6	DF	Aliou Cissé (c)	24 March 1976 (aged 26)	20	(France) Montpellier
7	FW	Henri Camara	10 May 1977 (aged 25)	34	(France) Sedan
8	FW	Amara Traoré	25 September 1965 (aged 36)	36	(France) Gueugnon
9	FW	Souleymane Camara	22 December 1982 (aged 19)	9	(France) Monaco
10	MF	Khalilou Fadiga	30 December 1974 (aged 27)	25	(France) Auxerre
11	FW	El Hadji Diouf	15 January 1981 (aged 21)	21	(France) Lens
12	MF	Amdy Faye	12 March 1977 (aged 25)	6	(France) Auxerre
13	DF	Lamine Diatta	2 July 1975 (aged 26)	19	(France) Rennes
14	MF	Moussa N'Diaye	20 February 1979 (aged 23)	38	(France) Sedan
15	MF	Salif Diao	10 February 1977 (aged 25)	20	(France) Sedan
16	GK	Omar Diallo	28 September 1972 (aged 29)	42	(Morocco) Olympique Khouribga
17	DF	Ferdinand Coly	10 September 1973 (aged 28)	16	(France) Lens
18	FW	Pape Thiaw	5 February 1981 (aged 21)	13	(France) Strasbourg
19	MF	Papa Bouba Diop	28 January 1978 (aged 24)	12	(France) Lens
20	MF	Sylvain N'Diaye	25 June 1976 (aged 25)	6	(France) Lille
21	DF	Habib Beye	19 October 1977 (aged 24)	6	(France) Strasbourg
22	GK	Kalidou Cissokho	28 August 1978 (aged 23)	0	(Senegal) Jeanne d'Arc
23	MF	Makhtar N'Diaye	31 December 1981 (aged 20)	11	(France) Rennes

=== Uruguay ===
Head coach: Víctor Púa

No.	Pos.	Player	Date of birth (age)	Caps	Club
1	GK	Fabián Carini	26 December 1979 (aged 22)	35	(Italy) Juventus
2	DF	Gustavo Méndez	3 February 1971 (aged 31)	44	(Uruguay) Nacional
3	DF	Alejandro Lembo	15 February 1978 (aged 24)	30	(Uruguay) Nacional
4	DF	Paolo Montero (c)	3 September 1971 (aged 30)	44	(Italy) Juventus
5	MF	Pablo García	11 May 1977 (aged 25)	35	(Italy) Venezia
6	DF	Darío Rodríguez	17 September 1974 (aged 27)	20	(Uruguay) Peñarol
7	MF	Gianni Guigou	22 February 1975 (aged 27)	35	(Italy) Roma
8	FW	Gustavo Varela	14 May 1978 (aged 24)	8	(Uruguay) Nacional
9	FW	Darío Silva	2 November 1972 (aged 29)	36	(Spain) Málaga
10	MF	Fabián O'Neill	14 October 1973 (aged 28)	19	(Italy) Perugia
11	FW	Federico Magallanes	22 August 1976 (aged 25)	24	(Italy) Venezia
12	GK	Gustavo Munúa	27 January 1978 (aged 24)	8	(Uruguay) Nacional
13	FW	Sebastián Abreu	17 October 1976 (aged 25)	13	(Mexico) Cruz Azul
14	DF	Gonzalo Sorondo	9 October 1979 (aged 22)	18	(Italy) Inter Milan
15	FW	Nicolás Olivera	30 May 1978 (aged 24)	25	(Spain) Sevilla
16	MF	Marcelo Romero	4 July 1976 (aged 25)	21	(Spain) Málaga
17	MF	Mario Regueiro	14 September 1978 (aged 23)	14	(Spain) Racing Santander
18	FW	Richard Morales	21 February 1975 (aged 27)	12	(Uruguay) Nacional
19	DF	Joe Bizera	17 May 1980 (aged 22)	9	(Uruguay) Peñarol
20	MF	Álvaro Recoba	17 March 1976 (aged 26)	42	(Italy) Inter Milan
21	FW	Diego Forlán	19 May 1979 (aged 23)	4	(England) Manchester United
22	MF	Gonzalo de los Santos	19 July 1976 (aged 25)	29	(Spain) Valencia
23	GK	Federico Elduayen	25 June 1977 (aged 24)	1	(Uruguay) Peñarol

== Group B ==
=== Paraguay ===
Head coach: (Italy) Cesare Maldini

No.	Pos.	Player	Date of birth (age)	Caps	Club
1	GK	José Luis Chilavert (c)	27 July 1965 (aged 36)	69	(France) Strasbourg
2	DF	Francisco Arce	2 April 1971 (aged 31)	51	(Brazil) Palmeiras
3	DF	Pedro Sarabia	5 July 1975 (aged 26)	40	(Argentina) River Plate
4	DF	Carlos Gamarra	17 February 1971 (aged 31)	76	(Greece) AEK Athens
5	DF	Celso Ayala	20 August 1970 (aged 31)	76	(Argentina) River Plate
6	MF	Estanislao Struway	25 June 1968 (aged 33)	69	(Paraguay) Libertad
7	FW	Richart Báez	31 July 1973 (aged 28)	25	(Paraguay) Olimpia
8	MF	Guido Alvarenga	24 August 1970 (aged 31)	18	(Mexico) Léon
9	FW	Roque Santa Cruz	16 August 1981 (aged 20)	24	(Germany) Bayern Munich
10	MF	Roberto Acuña	25 March 1972 (aged 30)	77	(Spain) Zaragoza
11	FW	Jorge Luis Campos	11 August 1970 (aged 31)	31	(Chile) Universidad Católica
12	GK	Justo Villar	30 June 1977 (aged 24)	8	(Paraguay) Libertad
13	MF	Carlos Paredes	16 July 1976 (aged 25)	41	(Portugal) Porto
14	MF	Diego Gavilán	1 March 1980 (aged 22)	21	(Mexico) Tecos
15	MF	Carlos Bonet	2 October 1977 (aged 24)	3	(Paraguay) Libertad
16	MF	Gustavo Morínigo	23 January 1977 (aged 25)	11	(Paraguay) Libertad
17	DF	Juan Carlos Franco	17 April 1973 (aged 29)	3	(Paraguay) Olimpia
18	DF	Julio César Cáceres	5 October 1979 (aged 22)	1	(Paraguay) Olimpia
19	DF	Daniel Sanabria	8 February 1977 (aged 25)	6	(Paraguay) Libertad
20	FW	José Cardozo	19 March 1971 (aged 31)	57	(Mexico) Toluca
21	DF	Denis Caniza	29 August 1974 (aged 27)	49	(Mexico) Santos Laguna
22	GK	Ricardo Tavarelli	2 August 1970 (aged 31)	20	(Paraguay) Olimpia
23	FW	Nelson Cuevas	10 January 1980 (aged 22)	11	(Argentina) River Plate

=== Slovenia ===
Head coach: Srečko Katanec

No.	Pos.	Player	Date of birth (age)	Caps	Club
1	GK	Marko Simeunovič	6 December 1967 (aged 34)	43	(Slovenia) Maribor
2	DF	Goran Sankovič	18 June 1979 (aged 22)	5	(Czech Republic) Slavia Prague
3	DF	Željko Milinovič	12 October 1969 (aged 32)	35	(Japan) JEF United Ichihara
4	DF	Muamer Vugdalić	25 August 1977 (aged 24)	13	(Slovenia) Maribor
5	DF	Marinko Galič	22 April 1970 (aged 32)	65	(Slovenia) Koper
6	DF	Aleksander Knavs	5 December 1975 (aged 26)	38	(Germany) 1. FC Kaiserslautern
7	MF	Džoni Novak	4 September 1969 (aged 32)	68	(Germany) SpVgg Unterhaching
8	MF	Aleš Čeh (c)	7 April 1968 (aged 34)	71	(Austria) Grazer AK
9	FW	Milan Osterc	4 July 1975 (aged 26)	41	(Israel) Hapoel Tel Aviv
10	MF	Zlatko Zahovič*	1 February 1971 (aged 31)	64	(Portugal) Benfica
11	MF	Miran Pavlin	8 October 1971 (aged 30)	45	(Portugal) Porto
12	GK	Mladen Dabanovič	13 September 1971 (aged 30)	20	(Belgium) Lokeren
13	FW	Mladen Rudonja	26 July 1971 (aged 30)	58	(England) Portsmouth
14	DF	Saša Gajser	11 February 1974 (aged 28)	20	(Belgium) Gent
15	MF	Rajko Tavčar	21 July 1974 (aged 27)	6	(Germany) 1. FC Nürnberg
16	FW	Senad Tiganj	28 August 1975 (aged 26)	3	(Slovenia) Olimpija Ljubljana
17	MF	Zoran Pavlović	27 June 1976 (aged 25)	21	Austria Wien
18	FW	Milenko Ačimovič	15 February 1977 (aged 25)	39	(Federal Republic of Yugoslavia) Red Star Belgrade
19	DF	Amir Karić	31 December 1973 (aged 28)	43	(Slovenia) Maribor
20	MF	Nastja Čeh	26 January 1978 (aged 24)	6	(Belgium) Club Brugge
21	FW	Sebastjan Cimirotič	14 September 1974 (aged 27)	12	(Italy) Lecce
22	GK	Dejan Nemec	1 March 1977 (aged 25)	1	(Belgium) Club Brugge
23	DF	Spasoje Bulajič	24 November 1975 (aged 26)	15	(Germany) 1. FC Köln

*Was expelled from the squad after the first game.

Note: caps for Yugoslavia are not counted.

=== South Africa ===
Head coach: Jomo Sono

No.	Pos.	Player	Date of birth (age)	Caps	Club
1	GK	Hans Vonk	30 January 1970 (aged 32)	29	(Netherlands) Heerenveen
2	DF	Cyril Nzama	26 June 1974 (aged 27)	19	(South Africa) Kaizer Chiefs
3	DF	Bradley Carnell	21 January 1977 (aged 25)	21	(Germany) VfB Stuttgart
4	DF	Aaron Mokoena	25 November 1980 (aged 21)	22	(Belgium) Germinal Beerschot
5	DF	Jacob Lekgetho	24 March 1974 (aged 28)	15	(Russia) Lokomotiv Moscow
6	MF	MacBeth Sibaya	25 November 1977 (aged 24)	9	(South Africa) Jomo Cosmos
7	MF	Quinton Fortune	21 May 1977 (aged 25)	39	(England) Manchester United
8	MF	Thabo Mngomeni	24 June 1969 (aged 32)	37	(South Africa) Orlando Pirates
9	MF	MacDonald Mukansi	26 May 1975 (aged 27)	7	(Bulgaria) Lokomotiv Sofia
10	MF	Bennett Mnguni	18 March 1974 (aged 28)	9	(Russia) Lokomotiv Moscow
11	MF	Jabu Pule	11 July 1980 (aged 21)	9	(South Africa) Kaizer Chiefs
12	MF	Teboho Mokoena	10 July 1974 (aged 27)	10	(Switzerland) St. Gallen
13	DF	Pierre Issa	12 September 1975 (aged 26)	41	(England) Watford
14	FW	Siyabonga Nomvethe	2 December 1977 (aged 24)	30	(Italy) Udinese
15	MF	Sibusiso Zuma	23 June 1975 (aged 26)	22	(Denmark) Copenhagen
16	GK	Andre Arendse	27 June 1967 (aged 34)	49	(South Africa) Santos Cape Town
17	FW	Benni McCarthy	12 November 1977 (aged 24)	43	(Portugal) Porto
18	MF	Delron Buckley	7 December 1977 (aged 24)	32	(Germany) VfL Bochum
19	DF	Lucas Radebe (c)	12 April 1969 (aged 33)	65	(England) Leeds United
20	GK	Calvin Marlin	20 April 1976 (aged 26)	2	(South Africa) Ajax Cape Town
21	MF	Steven Pienaar	17 March 1982 (aged 20)	0	(Netherlands) Ajax
22	DF	Thabang Molefe	11 April 1979 (aged 23)	5	(South Africa) Jomo Cosmos
23	FW	George Koumantarakis	27 March 1974 (aged 28)	6	(Switzerland) Basel

=== Spain ===
Head coach: José Antonio Camacho

No.	Pos.	Player	Date of birth (age)	Caps	Club
1	GK	Iker Casillas	20 May 1981 (aged 21)	13	(Spain) Real Madrid
2	DF	Curro Torres	27 December 1976 (aged 25)	4	(Spain) Valencia
3	DF	Juanfran	15 July 1976 (aged 25)	7	(Spain) Celta Vigo
4	MF	Iván Helguera	18 March 1975 (aged 27)	22	(Spain) Real Madrid
5	DF	Carles Puyol	13 April 1978 (aged 24)	8	(Spain) Barcelona
6	DF	Fernando Hierro (c)	23 March 1968 (aged 34)	85	(Spain) Real Madrid
7	FW	Raúl	27 June 1977 (aged 24)	51	(Spain) Real Madrid
8	MF	Rubén Baraja	11 July 1975 (aged 26)	9	(Spain) Valencia
9	FW	Fernando Morientes	5 April 1976 (aged 26)	19	(Spain) Real Madrid
10	FW	Diego Tristán	5 January 1976 (aged 26)	7	(Spain) Deportivo La Coruña
11	MF	Javier de Pedro	4 August 1973 (aged 28)	5	(Spain) Real Sociedad
12	FW	Albert Luque	11 March 1978 (aged 24)	0	(Spain) Mallorca
13	GK	Ricardo	30 December 1971 (aged 30)	1	(Spain) Valladolid
14	MF	David Albelda	1 September 1977 (aged 24)	2	(Spain) Valencia
15	DF	Enrique Romero	23 June 1971 (aged 30)	3	(Spain) Deportivo La Coruña
16	MF	Gaizka Mendieta	27 March 1974 (aged 28)	32	(Italy) Lazio
17	MF	Juan Carlos Valerón	17 June 1975 (aged 26)	20	(Spain) Deportivo La Coruña
18	MF	Sergio	10 November 1976 (aged 25)	5	(Spain) Deportivo La Coruña
19	MF	Xavi	25 January 1980 (aged 22)	3	(Spain) Barcelona
20	DF	Miguel Ángel Nadal	28 July 1966 (aged 35)	59	(Spain) Mallorca
21	MF	Luis Enrique	8 May 1970 (aged 32)	57	(Spain) Barcelona
22	MF	Joaquín	21 July 1981 (aged 20)	3	(Spain) Real Betis
23	GK	Pedro Contreras	7 January 1972 (aged 30)	0	(Spain) Málaga

== Group C ==
=== Brazil ===
Head coach: Luiz Felipe Scolari

No.	Pos.	Player	Date of birth (age)	Caps	Club
1	GK	Marcos	4 August 1973 (aged 28)	15	(Brazil) Palmeiras
2	DF	Cafu (c)	7 June 1970 (aged 31)	103	(Italy) Roma
3	DF	Lúcio	8 May 1978 (aged 24)	15	(Germany) Bayer Leverkusen
4	DF	Roque Júnior	31 August 1976 (aged 25)	17	(Italy) Milan
5	DF	Edmílson	10 July 1976 (aged 25)	12	(France) Lyon
6	DF	Roberto Carlos	10 April 1973 (aged 29)	84	(Spain) Real Madrid
7	MF	Ricardinho	23 May 1976 (aged 26)	3	(Brazil) Corinthians
8	MF	Gilberto Silva	7 October 1976 (aged 25)	6	(Brazil) Atlético Mineiro
9	FW	Ronaldo	18 September 1976 (aged 25)	56	(Italy) Inter Milan
10	MF	Rivaldo	19 April 1972 (aged 30)	58	(Spain) Barcelona
11	MF	Ronaldinho	21 March 1980 (aged 22)	24	(France) Paris Saint-Germain
12	GK	Dida	7 October 1973 (aged 28)	49	(Brazil) Corinthians
13	DF	Juliano Belletti	20 June 1976 (aged 25)	10	(Brazil) São Paulo
14	DF	Ânderson Polga	9 February 1979 (aged 23)	5	(Brazil) Grêmio
15	MF	Kléberson	19 June 1979 (aged 22)	5	(Brazil) Atlético Paranaense
16	DF	Júnior	20 June 1973 (aged 28)	12	(Italy) Parma
17	FW	Denílson	24 August 1977 (aged 24)	53	(Spain) Real Betis
18	MF	Vampeta	13 March 1974 (aged 28)	36	(Brazil) Corinthians
19	MF	Juninho Paulista	22 February 1973 (aged 29)	43	(Brazil) Flamengo
20	FW	Edílson	17 September 1971 (aged 30)	17	(Brazil) Cruzeiro
21	FW	Luizão	14 November 1975 (aged 26)	8	(Brazil) Grêmio
22	GK	Rogério Ceni	22 January 1973 (aged 29)	12	(Brazil) São Paulo
23	MF	Kaká	22 April 1982 (aged 20)	2	(Brazil) São Paulo

=== China PR ===
Head coach: (Serbia and Montenegro) Bora Milutinović

No.	Pos.	Player	Date of birth (age)	Caps	Club
1	GK	An Qi	21 June 1981 (aged 20)	5	(China) Dalian Shide
2	DF	Zhang Enhua	28 April 1973 (aged 29)	65	(China) Dalian Shide
3	DF	Yang Pu	30 March 1978 (aged 24)	14	(China) Beijing Guoan
4	DF	Wu Chengying	21 April 1975 (aged 27)	53	(China) Shanghai Shenhua
5	DF	Fan Zhiyi	6 November 1969 (aged 32)	105	(Scotland) Dundee
6	MF	Shao Jiayi	10 April 1980 (aged 22)	18	(China) Beijing Guoan
7	DF	Sun Jihai	30 September 1977 (aged 24)	59	(England) Manchester City
8	MF	Li Tie	18 May 1977 (aged 25)	76	(China) Liaoning
9	MF	Ma Mingyu (c)	4 February 1970 (aged 32)	91	(China) Sichuan First City
10	FW	Hao Haidong	9 May 1970 (aged 32)	95	(China) Dalian Shide
11	MF	Yu Genwei	7 January 1974 (aged 28)	17	(China) Tianjin Teda
12	FW	Su Maozhen	30 July 1972 (aged 29)	43	(China) Shandong Luneng
13	MF	Gao Yao	13 July 1977 (aged 24)	4	(China) Shandong Luneng
14	DF	Li Weifeng	1 December 1978 (aged 23)	55	(China) Shenzhen Pingan
15	MF	Zhao Junzhe	18 April 1979 (aged 23)	13	(China) Liaoning
16	FW	Qu Bo	15 July 1981 (aged 20)	16	(China) Qingdao Etsong Hainiu
17	DF	Du Wei	9 February 1982 (aged 20)	7	(China) Shanghai Shenhua
18	MF	Li Xiaopeng	20 June 1975 (aged 26)	26	(China) Shandong Luneng
19	MF	Qi Hong	3 June 1976 (aged 25)	36	(China) Beijing Chengfeng F.C.
20	FW	Yang Chen	17 January 1974 (aged 28)	26	(Germany) Eintracht Frankfurt
21	DF	Xu Yunlong	17 February 1979 (aged 23)	20	(China) Beijing Guoan
22	GK	Jiang Jin	7 October 1968 (aged 33)	52	(China) Tianjin Teda
23	GK	Ou Chuliang	26 August 1968 (aged 33)	74	(China) Yunnan Hongta

=== Costa Rica ===
Head coach: Alexandre Guimarães

No.	Pos.	Player	Date of birth (age)	Caps	Club
1	GK	Erick Lonnis (c)	9 September 1965 (aged 36)	74	(Costa Rica) Saprissa
2	DF	Jervis Drummond	8 September 1976 (aged 25)	38	(Costa Rica) Saprissa
3	DF	Luis Marín	10 August 1974 (aged 27)	74	(Costa Rica) Alajuelense
4	DF	Mauricio Wright	20 December 1970 (aged 31)	40	(Costa Rica) Herediano
5	DF	Gilberto Martínez	1 October 1979 (aged 22)	27	(Costa Rica) Saprissa
6	MF	Wílmer López	8 March 1971 (aged 31)	68	(Costa Rica) Alajuelense
7	FW	Rolando Fonseca	6 June 1974 (aged 27)	79	(Costa Rica) Alajuelense
8	MF	Mauricio Solís	13 December 1972 (aged 29)	84	(Costa Rica) Alajuelense
9	FW	Paulo Wanchope	31 July 1976 (aged 25)	48	(England) Manchester City
10	MF	Walter Centeno	6 October 1974 (aged 27)	49	(Costa Rica) Saprissa
11	FW	Rónald Gómez	24 January 1975 (aged 27)	53	(Greece) OFI
12	FW	Winston Parks	12 October 1981 (aged 20)	3	(Italy) Udinese
13	DF	Daniel Vallejos	27 May 1981 (aged 21)	2	(Costa Rica) Herediano
14	DF	Juan José Rodríguez	23 June 1967 (aged 34)	2	(Costa Rica) San Carlos
15	DF	Harold Wallace	7 September 1975 (aged 26)	54	(Costa Rica) Alajuelense
16	FW	Steven Bryce	16 August 1977 (aged 24)	33	(Costa Rica) Alajuelense
17	MF	Hernán Medford	23 May 1968 (aged 34)	87	(Costa Rica) Saprissa
18	GK	Álvaro Mesén	24 December 1972 (aged 29)	16	(Costa Rica) Alajuelense
19	MF	Rodrigo Cordero	4 December 1973 (aged 28)	25	(Costa Rica) Herediano
20	FW	William Sunsing	12 May 1977 (aged 25)	23	(Costa Rica) Herediano
21	DF	Pablo Chinchilla	21 December 1978 (aged 23)	12	(Costa Rica) Alajuelense
22	DF	Carlos Castro	10 September 1978 (aged 23)	22	(Costa Rica) Alajuelense
23	GK	Lester Morgan	2 May 1976 (aged 26)	6	(Costa Rica) Herediano

=== Turkey ===
Head coach: Şenol Güneş

No.	Pos.	Player	Date of birth (age)	Caps	Club
1	GK	Rüştü Reçber	10 May 1973 (aged 29)	64	(Turkey) Fenerbahçe
2	DF	Emre Aşık	13 December 1973 (aged 28)	16	(Turkey) Galatasaray
3	DF	Bülent Korkmaz	24 November 1968 (aged 33)	68	(Turkey) Galatasaray
4	DF	Fatih Akyel	26 December 1977 (aged 24)	36	(Turkey) Fenerbahçe
5	DF	Alpay Özalan	29 May 1973 (aged 29)	62	(England) Aston Villa
6	FW	Arif Erdem	2 January 1972 (aged 30)	50	(Turkey) Galatasaray
7	MF	Okan Buruk	19 October 1973 (aged 28)	26	(Italy) Inter Milan
8	MF	Tugay Kerimoğlu	24 August 1970 (aged 31)	69	(England) Blackburn Rovers
9	FW	Hakan Şükür (c)	1 September 1971 (aged 30)	73	(Italy) Parma
10	MF	Yıldıray Baştürk	24 December 1978 (aged 23)	13	(Germany) Bayer Leverkusen
11	FW	Hasan Şaş	1 August 1976 (aged 25)	14	(Turkey) Galatasaray
12	GK	Ömer Çatkıç	15 October 1974 (aged 27)	6	(Turkey) Gaziantepspor
13	MF	Muzzy Izzet	31 October 1974 (aged 27)	7	(England) Leicester City
14	MF	Tayfur Havutçu	23 April 1970 (aged 32)	39	(Turkey) Beşiktaş
15	FW	Nihat Kahveci	23 November 1979 (aged 22)	11	(Spain) Real Sociedad
16	DF	Ümit Özat	30 October 1976 (aged 25)	14	(Turkey) Fenerbahçe
17	FW	İlhan Mansız	10 August 1975 (aged 26)	6	(Turkey) Beşiktaş
18	MF	Ergün Penbe	17 May 1972 (aged 30)	21	(Turkey) Galatasaray
19	MF	Abdullah Ercan	8 December 1971 (aged 30)	70	(Turkey) Fenerbahçe
20	DF	Hakan Ünsal	14 May 1973 (aged 29)	25	(England) Blackburn Rovers
21	MF	Emre Belözoğlu	7 September 1980 (aged 21)	11	(Italy) Inter Milan
22	MF	Ümit Davala	30 July 1973 (aged 28)	24	(Italy) Milan
23	GK	Zafer Özgültekin	10 March 1975 (aged 27)	1	(Turkey) Ankaragücü

== Group D ==
=== Poland ===
Head coach: Jerzy Engel

No.	Pos.	Player	Date of birth (age)	Caps	Club
1	GK	Jerzy Dudek	23 March 1973 (aged 29)	21	(England) Liverpool
2	DF	Tomasz Kłos	7 March 1973 (aged 29)	37	(Germany) 1. FC Kaiserslautern
3	DF	Jacek Zieliński	10 October 1967 (aged 34)	52	(Poland) Legia Warsaw
4	DF	Michał Żewłakow	22 April 1976 (aged 26)	25	(Belgium) Mouscron
5	DF	Tomasz Rząsa	11 March 1973 (aged 29)	9	(Netherlands) Feyenoord
6	DF	Tomasz Hajto	16 October 1972 (aged 29)	44	(Germany) Schalke 04
7	MF	Piotr Świerczewski	8 April 1972 (aged 30)	65	(France) Marseille
8	FW	Cezary Kucharski	17 February 1972 (aged 30)	15	(Poland) Legia Warsaw
9	FW	Paweł Kryszałowicz	23 June 1974 (aged 27)	23	(Germany) Eintracht Frankfurt
10	MF	Radosław Kałużny	2 February 1974 (aged 28)	30	(Germany) Energie Cottbus
11	FW	Emmanuel Olisadebe	22 December 1978 (aged 23)	16	(Greece) Panathinaikos
12	GK	Radosław Majdan	10 May 1972 (aged 30)	5	(Turkey) Göztepe
13	DF	Arkadiusz Głowacki	13 March 1979 (aged 23)	2	(Poland) Wisła Kraków
14	FW	Marcin Żewłakow	22 April 1976 (aged 26)	17	(Belgium) Mouscron
15	DF	Tomasz Wałdoch (c)	10 May 1971 (aged 31)	71	(Germany) Schalke 04
16	DF	Maciej Murawski	20 February 1974 (aged 28)	4	(Poland) Legia Warsaw
17	MF	Arkadiusz Bąk	6 October 1974 (aged 27)	12	(Poland) Widzew Łódź
18	FW	Jacek Krzynówek	15 May 1976 (aged 26)	23	(Germany) 1. FC Nürnberg
19	FW	Maciej Żurawski	12 September 1976 (aged 25)	9	(Poland) Wisła Kraków
20	DF	Jacek Bąk	24 March 1973 (aged 29)	36	(France) Lens
21	MF	Marek Koźmiński	7 February 1971 (aged 31)	42	(Italy) Ancona
22	GK	Adam Matysek	19 July 1968 (aged 33)	34	(Poland) RKS Radomsko
23	MF	Paweł Sibik	15 February 1971 (aged 31)	2	(Poland) Odra Wodzisław

=== Portugal ===
Head coach: António Oliveira

No.	Pos.	Player	Date of birth (age)	Caps	Club
1	GK	Vítor Baía	15 October 1969 (aged 32)	75	(Portugal) Porto
2	DF	Jorge Costa	14 October 1971 (aged 30)	46	(Portugal) Porto
3	DF	Abel Xavier	30 November 1972 (aged 29)	18	(England) Liverpool
4	DF	Marco Caneira	9 February 1979 (aged 23)	1	(Portugal) Benfica
5	DF	Fernando Couto (c)	2 August 1969 (aged 32)	82	(Italy) Lazio
6	MF	Paulo Sousa	30 August 1970 (aged 31)	50	(Spain) Espanyol
7	MF	Luís Figo	4 November 1972 (aged 29)	81	(Spain) Real Madrid
8	FW	João Pinto	19 August 1971 (aged 30)	77	(Portugal) Sporting CP
9	FW	Pauleta	28 April 1973 (aged 29)	33	(France) Bordeaux
10	MF	Rui Costa	29 March 1972 (aged 30)	67	(Italy) Milan
11	MF	Sérgio Conceição	15 November 1974 (aged 27)	41	(Italy) Inter Milan
12	MF	Hugo Viana	15 January 1983 (aged 19)	4	(Portugal) Sporting CP
13	DF	Jorge Andrade	9 April 1978 (aged 24)	5	(Portugal) Porto
14	MF	Pedro Barbosa	6 August 1970 (aged 31)	21	(Portugal) Sporting CP
15	GK	Nélson Pereira	20 October 1975 (aged 26)	1	(Portugal) Sporting CP
16	GK	Ricardo	11 February 1976 (aged 26)	10	(Portugal) Boavista
17	MF	Paulo Bento	20 June 1969 (aged 32)	31	(Portugal) Sporting CP
18	DF	Nuno Frechaut	24 September 1977 (aged 24)	9	(Portugal) Boavista
19	MF	Capucho	21 February 1972 (aged 30)	29	(Portugal) Porto
20	MF	Petit	25 September 1976 (aged 25)	9	(Portugal) Boavista
21	FW	Nuno Gomes	5 July 1976 (aged 25)	28	(Italy) Fiorentina
22	DF	Beto	3 May 1976 (aged 26)	16	(Portugal) Sporting CP
23	DF	Rui Jorge	27 March 1973 (aged 29)	20	(Portugal) Sporting CP

=== South Korea ===
Head coach: (Netherlands) Guus Hiddink

No.	Pos.	Player	Date of birth (age)	Caps	Club
1	GK	Lee Woon-jae	26 April 1973 (aged 29)	31	(South Korea) Suwon Samsung Bluewings
2	DF	Hyun Young-min	25 December 1979 (aged 22)	8	(South Korea) Ulsan Hyundai Horangi
3	MF	Choi Sung-yong	25 December 1975 (aged 26)	60	(South Korea) Suwon Samsung Bluewings
4	DF	Choi Jin-cheul	26 March 1971 (aged 31)	15	(South Korea) Jeonbuk Hyundai Motors
5	MF	Kim Nam-il	14 March 1977 (aged 25)	23	(South Korea) Jeonnam Dragons
6	MF	Yoo Sang-chul	18 October 1971 (aged 30)	93	(Japan) Kashiwa Reysol
7	DF	Kim Tae-young	8 November 1970 (aged 31)	78	(South Korea) Jeonnam Dragons
8	FW	Choi Tae-uk	13 March 1981 (aged 21)	16	(South Korea) Anyang LG Cheetahs
9	FW	Seol Ki-hyeon	8 January 1979 (aged 23)	31	(Belgium) Anderlecht
10	DF	Lee Young-pyo	23 April 1977 (aged 25)	51	(South Korea) FC Seoul
11	FW	Choi Yong-soo	10 September 1973 (aged 28)	58	(Japan) JEF United Ichihara
12	GK	Kim Byung-ji	8 April 1970 (aged 32)	58	(South Korea) Pohang Steelers
13	MF	Lee Eul-yong	8 September 1975 (aged 26)	19	(South Korea) Bucheon SK
14	FW	Lee Chun-soo	9 July 1981 (aged 20)	22	(South Korea) Ulsan Hyundai Horangi
15	DF	Lee Min-sung	23 June 1973 (aged 28)	52	(South Korea) Busan I'Cons
16	FW	Cha Du-ri	25 July 1980 (aged 21)	12	(South Korea) Korea University
17	MF	Yoon Jong-hwan	16 February 1973 (aged 29)	36	(Japan) Cerezo Osaka
18	FW	Hwang Sun-hong	14 July 1968 (aged 33)	97	(Japan) Kashiwa Reysol
19	FW	Ahn Jung-hwan	27 January 1976 (aged 26)	19	(Italy) Perugia
20	DF	Hong Myung-bo (c)	12 February 1969 (aged 33)	128	(South Korea) Pohang Steelers
21	MF	Park Ji-sung	30 March 1981 (aged 21)	33	(Japan) Kyoto Purple Sanga
22	MF	Song Chong-gug	20 February 1979 (aged 23)	27	(South Korea) Busan I'Cons
23	GK	Choi Eun-sung	5 April 1971 (aged 31)	1	(South Korea) Daejeon Citizen

=== United States ===
Head coach: Bruce Arena

No.	Pos.	Player	Date of birth (age)	Caps	Club
1	GK	Brad Friedel	8 May 1971 (aged 31)	74	(England) Blackburn Rovers
2	MF	Frankie Hejduk	5 August 1974 (aged 27)	38	(Germany) Bayer Leverkusen
3	DF	Gregg Berhalter	1 August 1973 (aged 28)	25	(England) Crystal Palace
4	DF	Pablo Mastroeni	29 August 1976 (aged 25)	8	(United States) Colorado Rapids
5	MF	John O'Brien	29 August 1977 (aged 24)	13	(Netherlands) Ajax
6	DF	David Regis	2 December 1968 (aged 33)	28	(France) Metz
7	MF	Eddie Lewis	17 May 1974 (aged 28)	38	(England) Fulham
8	MF	Earnie Stewart	28 March 1969 (aged 33)	77	(Netherlands) NAC Breda
9	FW	Joe-Max Moore	23 February 1971 (aged 31)	95	(England) Everton
10	MF	Claudio Reyna (c)	20 July 1973 (aged 28)	86	(England) Sunderland
11	FW	Clint Mathis	25 November 1976 (aged 25)	19	(United States) MetroStars
12	DF	Jeff Agoos	2 May 1968 (aged 34)	127	(United States) San Jose Earthquakes
13	MF	Cobi Jones	16 June 1970 (aged 31)	153	(United States) LA Galaxy
14	DF	Steve Cherundolo	19 February 1979 (aged 23)	10	(Germany) Hannover 96
15	FW	Josh Wolff	25 February 1977 (aged 25)	16	(United States) Chicago Fire
16	DF	Carlos Llamosa	30 June 1969 (aged 32)	26	(United States) New England Revolution
17	MF	DaMarcus Beasley	24 May 1982 (aged 20)	9	(United States) Chicago Fire
18	GK	Kasey Keller	29 November 1969 (aged 32)	58	(England) Tottenham Hotspur
19	GK	Tony Meola	21 February 1969 (aged 33)	98	(United States) Kansas City Wizards
20	FW	Brian McBride	19 June 1972 (aged 29)	58	(United States) Columbus Crew
21	FW	Landon Donovan	4 March 1982 (aged 20)	20	(United States) San Jose Earthquakes
22	DF	Tony Sanneh	1 June 1971 (aged 30)	29	(Germany) 1. FC Nürnberg
23	DF	Eddie Pope	24 December 1973 (aged 28)	48	(United States) D.C. United

== Group E ==
=== Cameroon ===
Head coach: (Germany) Winfried Schäfer

No.	Pos.	Player	Date of birth (age)	Caps	Club
1	GK	Alioum Boukar	3 January 1972 (aged 30)	46	(Turkey) Samsunspor
2	DF	Bill Tchato	14 May 1975 (aged 27)	12	(France) Montpellier
3	DF	Pierre Womé	26 March 1979 (aged 23)	46	(Italy) Bologna
4	DF	Rigobert Song (c)	1 July 1976 (aged 25)	59	(Germany) 1. FC Köln
5	DF	Raymond Kalla	22 April 1975 (aged 27)	47	(Spain) Extremadura
6	DF	Pierre Njanka	15 March 1975 (aged 27)	31	(France) Strasbourg
7	MF	Joseph N'Do	28 April 1976 (aged 26)	16	(Saudi Arabia) Al-Khaleej
8	DF	Geremi	20 December 1978 (aged 23)	38	(Spain) Real Madrid
9	FW	Samuel Eto'o	10 March 1981 (aged 21)	27	(Spain) Mallorca
10	FW	Patrick M'Boma	15 November 1970 (aged 31)	42	(England) Sunderland
11	FW	Pius N'Diefi	5 July 1975 (aged 26)	13	(France) Sedan
12	MF	Lauren	19 January 1977 (aged 25)	15	(England) Arsenal
13	DF	Lucien Mettomo	19 April 1977 (aged 25)	17	(England) Manchester City
14	MF	Joël Epalle	20 February 1978 (aged 24)	22	(Greece) Panachaiki
15	MF	Nicolas Alnoudji	9 December 1979 (aged 22)	15	(Turkey) Rizespor
16	GK	Jacques Songo'o	17 March 1964 (aged 38)	66	(France) Metz
17	MF	Marc-Vivien Foé	1 May 1975 (aged 27)	47	(France) Lyon
18	FW	Patrick Suffo	17 January 1978 (aged 24)	18	(England) Sheffield United
19	MF	Eric Djemba-Djemba	4 May 1981 (aged 21)	0	(France) Nantes
20	MF	Salomon Olembé	8 December 1980 (aged 21)	39	(France) Marseille
21	FW	Joseph-Désiré Job	1 December 1977 (aged 24)	34	(France) Metz
22	GK	Carlos Kameni	18 February 1984 (aged 18)	1	(France) Le Havre
23	MF	Daniel N'Gom Kome	19 May 1980 (aged 22)	4	(Spain) Numancia

=== Germany ===
Head coach: Rudi Völler

No.	Pos.	Player	Date of birth (age)	Caps	Club
1	GK	Oliver Kahn (c)	15 June 1969 (aged 32)	45	(Germany) Bayern Munich
2	DF	Thomas Linke	26 December 1969 (aged 32)	34	(Germany) Bayern Munich
3	DF	Marko Rehmer	29 April 1972 (aged 30)	27	(Germany) Hertha BSC
4	DF	Frank Baumann	29 October 1975 (aged 26)	11	(Germany) Werder Bremen
5	MF	Carsten Ramelow	20 March 1974 (aged 28)	25	(Germany) Bayer Leverkusen
6	DF	Christian Ziege	1 February 1972 (aged 30)	66	(England) Tottenham Hotspur
7	FW	Oliver Neuville	1 May 1973 (aged 29)	30	(Germany) Bayer Leverkusen
8	MF	Dietmar Hamann	27 August 1973 (aged 28)	40	(England) Liverpool
9	FW	Carsten Jancker	28 August 1974 (aged 27)	26	(Germany) Bayern Munich
10	MF	Lars Ricken	10 July 1976 (aged 25)	16	(Germany) Borussia Dortmund
11	FW	Miroslav Klose	9 June 1978 (aged 23)	12	(Germany) 1. FC Kaiserslautern
12	GK	Jens Lehmann	10 November 1969 (aged 32)	14	(Germany) Borussia Dortmund
13	MF	Michael Ballack	26 September 1976 (aged 25)	22	(Germany) Bayer Leverkusen
14	FW	Gerald Asamoah	3 October 1978 (aged 23)	11	(Germany) Schalke 04
15	DF	Sebastian Kehl	13 February 1980 (aged 22)	8	(Germany) Borussia Dortmund
16	MF	Jens Jeremies	5 March 1974 (aged 28)	33	(Germany) Bayern Munich
17	MF	Marco Bode	23 July 1969 (aged 32)	34	(Germany) Werder Bremen
18	MF	Jörg Böhme	22 January 1974 (aged 28)	6	(Germany) Schalke 04
19	MF	Bernd Schneider	17 November 1973 (aged 28)	9	(Germany) Bayer Leverkusen
20	FW	Oliver Bierhoff	1 May 1968 (aged 34)	65	(France) Monaco
21	DF	Christoph Metzelder	5 November 1980 (aged 21)	6	(Germany) Borussia Dortmund
22	MF	Torsten Frings	22 November 1976 (aged 25)	8	(Germany) Werder Bremen
23	GK	Hans-Jörg Butt	28 May 1974 (aged 28)	2	(Germany) Bayer Leverkusen

=== Republic of Ireland ===
Head coach: Mick McCarthy

- Roy Keane left the squad before the tournament and was not replaced. Keane was technically still part of the named squad and appeared in FIFA's official squad lists.

No.	Pos.	Player	Date of birth (age)	Caps	Club
1	GK	Shay Given	20 April 1976 (aged 26)	39	(England) Newcastle United
2	DF	Steve Finnan	24 April 1976 (aged 26)	13	(England) Fulham
3	DF	Ian Harte	31 August 1977 (aged 24)	40	(England) Leeds United
4	DF	Kenny Cunningham	28 June 1971 (aged 30)	38	(England) Wimbledon
5	DF	Steve Staunton (c)	19 January 1969 (aged 33)	98	(England) Aston Villa
6	MF	Roy Keane*	10 August 1971 (aged 30)	58	(England) Manchester United
7	MF	Jason McAteer	18 June 1971 (aged 30)	47	(England) Sunderland
8	MF	Matt Holland	11 April 1974 (aged 28)	19	(England) Ipswich Town
9	MF	Damien Duff	2 March 1979 (aged 23)	26	(England) Blackburn Rovers
10	FW	Robbie Keane	8 July 1980 (aged 21)	33	(England) Leeds United
11	MF	Kevin Kilbane	1 February 1977 (aged 25)	31	(England) Sunderland
12	MF	Mark Kinsella	12 August 1972 (aged 29)	28	(England) Charlton Athletic
13	FW	David Connolly	6 June 1977 (aged 24)	33	(England) Wimbledon
14	DF	Gary Breen	12 December 1973 (aged 28)	43	(England) Coventry City
15	DF	Richard Dunne	21 September 1979 (aged 22)	14	(England) Manchester City
16	GK	Dean Kiely	10 October 1970 (aged 31)	6	(England) Charlton Athletic
17	FW	Niall Quinn	6 October 1966 (aged 35)	88	(England) Sunderland
18	DF	Gary Kelly	9 July 1974 (aged 27)	46	(England) Leeds United
19	FW	Clinton Morrison	14 May 1979 (aged 23)	7	(England) Crystal Palace
20	DF	Andrew O'Brien	29 June 1979 (aged 22)	5	(England) Newcastle United
21	MF	Steven Reid	10 March 1981 (aged 21)	5	(England) Millwall
22	MF	Lee Carsley	28 February 1974 (aged 28)	19	(England) Everton
23	GK	Alan Kelly	11 August 1968 (aged 33)	34	(England) Blackburn Rovers

=== Saudi Arabia ===
Head coach: Nasser Al-Johar

No.	Pos.	Player	Date of birth (age)	Caps	Club
1	GK	Mohamed Al-Deayea	2 August 1972 (aged 29)	168	(Saudi Arabia) Al Hilal
2	DF	Mohammed Sheliah	28 September 1974 (aged 27)	73	(Saudi Arabia) Al Ahli
3	DF	Redha Tukar	29 November 1975 (aged 26)	5	(Saudi Arabia) Al Shabab
4	DF	Abdullah Zubromawi	15 November 1973 (aged 28)	115	(Saudi Arabia) Al Ahli
5	DF	Mohsin Al-Harthi	17 July 1976 (aged 25)	20	(Saudi Arabia) Al Nassr
6	DF	Fouzi Al-Shehri	15 May 1980 (aged 22)	2	(Saudi Arabia) Al Ahli
7	MF	Ibrahim Suwayed	21 July 1974 (aged 27)	59	(Saudi Arabia) Al Ahli
8	MF	Mohammed Noor	26 February 1978 (aged 24)	29	(Saudi Arabia) Al-Ittihad
9	FW	Sami Al-Jaber (c)	11 December 1972 (aged 29)	148	(Saudi Arabia) Al Hilal
10	MF	Mohammad Al-Shalhoub	8 December 1980 (aged 21)	17	(Saudi Arabia) Al Hilal
11	FW	Obeid Al-Dosari	2 October 1975 (aged 26)	97	(Saudi Arabia) Al Ahli
12	DF	Ahmed Al-Dokhi	25 October 1976 (aged 25)	47	(Saudi Arabia) Al Hilal
13	DF	Hussein Abdulghani	21 January 1977 (aged 25)	80	(Saudi Arabia) Al Ahli
14	MF	Abdulaziz Al-Khathran	31 July 1973 (aged 28)	0	(Saudi Arabia) Al Shabab
15	FW	Abdullah Al-Jumaan	10 November 1977 (aged 24)	20	(Saudi Arabia) Al Hilal
16	MF	Khamis Al-Owairan	8 September 1973 (aged 28)	76	(Saudi Arabia) Al-Ittihad
17	MF	Abdullah Al-Waked	29 September 1975 (aged 26)	45	(Saudi Arabia) Al Shabab
18	MF	Nawaf Al-Temyat	28 June 1976 (aged 25)	48	(Saudi Arabia) Al Hilal
19	MF	Omar Al-Ghamdi	11 April 1979 (aged 23)	28	(Saudi Arabia) Al Hilal
20	FW	Al-Hasan Al-Yami	21 August 1972 (aged 29)	18	(Saudi Arabia) Al-Ittihad
21	GK	Mabrouk Zaid	11 February 1979 (aged 23)	1	(Saudi Arabia) Al-Ittihad
22	GK	Mohammed Al-Khojali	15 January 1973 (aged 29)	12	(Saudi Arabia) Al Nassr
23	DF	Mansour Al-Thagafi	14 January 1979 (aged 23)	0	(Saudi Arabia) Al Nassr

== Group F ==
=== Argentina ===
Head coach: Marcelo Bielsa

No.	Pos.	Player	Date of birth (age)	Caps	Club
1	GK	Germán Burgos	16 April 1969 (aged 33)	35	(Spain) Atlético Madrid
2	DF	Roberto Ayala	14 April 1973 (aged 29)	74	(Spain) Valencia
3	DF	Juan Pablo Sorín	5 May 1976 (aged 26)	35	(Brazil) Cruzeiro
4	DF	Mauricio Pochettino	2 March 1972 (aged 30)	16	(France) Paris Saint-Germain
5	MF	Matías Almeyda	21 December 1973 (aged 28)	33	(Italy) Parma
6	DF	Walter Samuel	23 March 1978 (aged 24)	30	(Italy) Roma
7	FW	Claudio López	17 July 1974 (aged 27)	49	(Italy) Lazio
8	DF	Javier Zanetti	10 August 1973 (aged 28)	66	(Italy) Inter Milan
9	FW	Gabriel Batistuta (c)	1 February 1969 (aged 33)	75	(Italy) Roma
10	MF	Ariel Ortega	4 March 1974 (aged 28)	81	(Argentina) River Plate
11	MF	Juan Sebastián Verón	9 March 1975 (aged 27)	47	(England) Manchester United
12	GK	Pablo Cavallero	13 April 1974 (aged 28)	8	(Spain) Celta Vigo
13	DF	Diego Placente	24 April 1977 (aged 25)	6	(Germany) Bayer Leverkusen
14	MF	Diego Simeone	28 April 1970 (aged 32)	104	(Italy) Lazio
15	MF	Claudio Husaín	20 November 1974 (aged 27)	14	(Argentina) River Plate
16	MF	Pablo Aimar	3 November 1979 (aged 22)	18	(Spain) Valencia
17	MF	Gustavo López	13 April 1973 (aged 29)	31	(Spain) Celta Vigo
18	MF	Kily González	4 August 1974 (aged 27)	30	(Spain) Valencia
19	FW	Hernán Crespo	5 July 1975 (aged 26)	33	(Italy) Lazio
20	MF	Marcelo Gallardo	18 January 1976 (aged 26)	42	(France) Monaco
21	FW	Claudio Caniggia	9 January 1967 (aged 35)	50	(Scotland) Rangers
22	DF	José Chamot	17 May 1969 (aged 33)	42	(Italy) Milan
23	GK	Roberto Bonano	24 January 1970 (aged 32)	13	(Spain) Barcelona

Originally, the squad was named with Ariel Ortega given shirt number 23 and Roberto Bonano number 24, as the Argentine Football Association had decided to retire the number 10 shirt in honour of Diego Maradona. FIFA, however, insisted that all squads were assigned with numbers ranging only from 1–23, prompting Argentina to amend their squad list.

=== England ===
Head coach: (Sweden) Sven-Göran Eriksson

No.	Pos.	Player	Date of birth (age)	Caps	Club
1	GK	David Seaman	19 September 1963 (aged 38)	68	(England) Arsenal
2	DF	Danny Mills	18 May 1977 (aged 25)	7	(England) Leeds United
3	DF	Ashley Cole	20 December 1980 (aged 21)	8	(England) Arsenal
4	MF	Trevor Sinclair	2 March 1973 (aged 29)	5	(England) West Ham United
5	DF	Rio Ferdinand	7 November 1978 (aged 23)	21	(England) Leeds United
6	DF	Sol Campbell	18 September 1974 (aged 27)	45	(England) Arsenal
7	MF	David Beckham (c)	2 May 1975 (aged 27)	49	(England) Manchester United
8	MF	Paul Scholes	16 November 1974 (aged 27)	43	(England) Manchester United
9	FW	Robbie Fowler	9 April 1975 (aged 27)	24	(England) Leeds United
10	FW	Michael Owen	14 December 1979 (aged 22)	35	(England) Liverpool
11	FW	Emile Heskey	11 January 1978 (aged 24)	23	(England) Liverpool
12	DF	Wes Brown	13 October 1979 (aged 22)	6	(England) Manchester United
13	GK	Nigel Martyn	11 August 1966 (aged 35)	22	(England) Leeds United
14	DF	Wayne Bridge	5 August 1980 (aged 21)	5	(England) Southampton
15	DF	Martin Keown	24 July 1966 (aged 35)	42	(England) Arsenal
16	DF	Gareth Southgate	3 September 1970 (aged 31)	48	(England) Middlesbrough
17	FW	Teddy Sheringham	2 April 1966 (aged 36)	46	(England) Tottenham Hotspur
18	MF	Owen Hargreaves	20 January 1981 (aged 21)	6	(Germany) Bayern Munich
19	MF	Joe Cole	8 November 1981 (aged 20)	6	(England) West Ham United
20	FW	Darius Vassell	13 June 1980 (aged 21)	5	(England) Aston Villa
21	MF	Nicky Butt	21 January 1975 (aged 27)	18	(England) Manchester United
22	GK	David James	1 August 1970 (aged 31)	9	(England) West Ham United
23	MF	Kieron Dyer	29 December 1978 (aged 23)	9	(England) Newcastle United

=== Nigeria ===
Head coach: Festus Onigbinde

No.	Pos.	Player	Date of birth (age)	Caps	Club
1	GK	Ike Shorunmu	16 October 1967 (aged 34)	34	(Switzerland) Lucerne
2	DF	Joseph Yobo	6 September 1980 (aged 21)	14	(France) Marseille
3	DF	Celestine Babayaro	29 August 1978 (aged 23)	24	(England) Chelsea
4	FW	Nwankwo Kanu	1 August 1976 (aged 25)	33	(England) Arsenal
5	DF	Isaac Okoronkwo	1 May 1978 (aged 24)	12	(Ukraine) Shakhtar Donetsk
6	DF	Taribo West	26 March 1974 (aged 28)	38	(Germany) 1. FC Kaiserslautern
7	MF	Pius Ikedia	11 July 1980 (aged 21)	9	(Netherlands) Ajax
8	MF	Mutiu Adepoju	22 December 1970 (aged 31)	49	(Spain) Salamanca
9	FW	Bartholomew Ogbeche	1 October 1984 (aged 17)	4	(France) Paris Saint-Germain
10	MF	Jay-Jay Okocha (c)	14 August 1973 (aged 28)	56	(France) Paris Saint-Germain
11	MF	Garba Lawal	22 May 1974 (aged 28)	34	(Netherlands) Roda JC
12	GK	Austin Ejide	8 April 1984 (aged 18)	3	(Nigeria) Gabros International
13	DF	Rabiu Afolabi	18 April 1980 (aged 22)	5	(Belgium) Standard Liège
14	DF	Ifeanyi Udeze	21 July 1980 (aged 21)	15	(Greece) PAOK
15	MF	Justice Christopher	24 December 1981 (aged 20)	7	(Belgium) Antwerp
16	DF	Efe Sodje	5 October 1972 (aged 29)	7	(England) Crewe Alexandra
17	FW	Julius Aghahowa	12 February 1982 (aged 20)	17	(Ukraine) Shakhtar Donetsk
18	FW	Benedict Akwuegbu	3 November 1974 (aged 27)	16	(China) Shenyang Jinde
19	DF	Eric Ejiofor	21 July 1979 (aged 22)	12	(Israel) Maccabi Haifa
20	MF	James Obiorah	24 August 1978 (aged 23)	2	(Russia) Lokomotiv Moscow
21	MF	John Utaka	8 January 1982 (aged 20)	4	(Qatar) Al Sadd
22	GK	Vincent Enyeama	29 August 1982 (aged 19)	2	(Nigeria) Enyimba
23	MF	Femi Opabunmi	3 March 1985 (aged 17)	2	(Nigeria) Ibadan

=== Sweden ===
Head coaches: Lars Lagerbäck and Tommy Söderberg

No.	Pos.	Player	Date of birth (age)	Caps	Club
1	GK	Magnus Hedman	19 March 1973 (aged 29)	44	(England) Coventry City
2	DF	Olof Mellberg	3 September 1977 (aged 24)	21	(England) Aston Villa
3	DF	Patrik Andersson (c)	18 August 1971 (aged 30)	95	(Spain) Barcelona
4	DF	Johan Mjällby	9 February 1971 (aged 31)	35	(Scotland) Celtic
5	DF	Michael Svensson	25 November 1975 (aged 26)	11	(France) Troyes
6	MF	Tobias Linderoth	21 April 1979 (aged 23)	19	(England) Everton
7	MF	Niclas Alexandersson	29 December 1971 (aged 30)	58	(England) Everton
8	MF	Anders Svensson	17 July 1976 (aged 25)	24	(England) Southampton
9	MF	Freddie Ljungberg	16 April 1977 (aged 25)	31	(England) Arsenal
10	FW	Marcus Allbäck	5 July 1973 (aged 28)	18	(Netherlands) Heerenveen
11	FW	Henrik Larsson	20 September 1971 (aged 30)	67	(Scotland) Celtic
12	GK	Magnus Kihlstedt	29 February 1972 (aged 30)	12	(Denmark) Copenhagen
13	DF	Tomas Antonelius	7 May 1973 (aged 29)	6	(Denmark) Copenhagen
14	DF	Erik Edman	11 November 1978 (aged 23)	5	(Netherlands) Heerenveen
15	DF	Andreas Jakobsson	6 October 1972 (aged 29)	12	(Germany) Hansa Rostock
16	DF	Teddy Lučić	15 April 1973 (aged 29)	41	(Sweden) AIK
17	MF	Magnus Svensson	10 March 1969 (aged 33)	24	(Denmark) Brøndby
18	MF	Mattias Jonson	16 January 1974 (aged 28)	23	(Denmark) Brøndby
19	MF	Pontus Farnerud	4 June 1980 (aged 21)	2	(France) Monaco
20	MF	Daniel Andersson	28 August 1977 (aged 24)	38	(Italy) Venezia
21	FW	Zlatan Ibrahimović	3 October 1981 (aged 20)	9	(Netherlands) Ajax
22	FW	Andreas Andersson	10 April 1974 (aged 28)	32	(Sweden) AIK
23	GK	Andreas Isaksson	3 October 1981 (aged 20)	1	(Sweden) Djurgården

== Group G ==
=== Croatia ===
Head coach: Mirko Jozić

No.	Pos.	Player	Date of birth (age)	Caps	Club
1	GK	Stipe Pletikosa	8 January 1979 (aged 23)	17	(Croatia) Hajduk Split
2	DF	Anthony Šerić	15 January 1979 (aged 23)	8	(Italy) Hellas Verona
3	DF	Josip Šimunić	18 February 1978 (aged 24)	6	(Germany) Hertha BSC
4	DF	Stjepan Tomas	6 March 1976 (aged 26)	17	(Italy) Vicenza
5	MF	Milan Rapaić	16 August 1973 (aged 28)	23	(Turkey) Fenerbahçe
6	DF	Boris Živković	15 November 1975 (aged 26)	15	(Germany) Bayer Leverkusen
7	FW	Davor Vugrinec	24 March 1975 (aged 27)	21	(Italy) Lecce
8	MF	Robert Prosinečki	12 January 1969 (aged 33)	48	(England) Portsmouth
9	FW	Davor Šuker (c)	1 January 1968 (aged 34)	68	(Germany) 1860 Munich
10	MF	Niko Kovač	15 October 1971 (aged 30)	20	(Germany) Bayern Munich
11	FW	Alen Bokšić	21 January 1970 (aged 32)	36	(England) Middlesbrough
12	GK	Tomislav Butina	30 March 1974 (aged 28)	7	(Croatia) Dinamo Zagreb
13	MF	Mario Stanić	10 April 1972 (aged 30)	43	(England) Chelsea
14	MF	Zvonimir Soldo	2 November 1967 (aged 34)	59	(Germany) VfB Stuttgart
15	DF	Daniel Šarić	4 August 1972 (aged 29)	25	(Greece) Panathinaikos
16	MF	Jurica Vranješ	31 January 1980 (aged 22)	7	(Germany) Bayer Leverkusen
17	DF	Robert Jarni	26 October 1968 (aged 33)	78	(Greece) Panathinaikos
18	FW	Ivica Olić	14 September 1979 (aged 22)	4	(Croatia) Zagreb
19	FW	Goran Vlaović	7 August 1972 (aged 29)	50	(Greece) Panathinaikos
20	DF	Dario Šimić	12 November 1975 (aged 26)	48	(Italy) Inter Milan
21	DF	Robert Kovač	6 April 1974 (aged 28)	19	(Germany) Bayern Munich
22	FW	Boško Balaban	15 October 1978 (aged 23)	13	(England) Aston Villa
23	GK	Vladimir Vasilj	6 July 1975 (aged 26)	2	(Croatia) Zagreb

Note: caps for Yugoslavia are not counted.

=== Ecuador ===
Head coach: (Colombia) Hernán Darío Gómez

No.	Pos.	Player	Date of birth (age)	Caps	Club
1	GK	José Francisco Cevallos	17 April 1971 (aged 31)	62	(Ecuador) Barcelona SC
2	DF	Augusto Poroso	13 April 1974 (aged 28)	26	(Ecuador) Emelec
3	DF	Iván Hurtado	16 August 1974 (aged 27)	90	(Ecuador) Barcelona SC
4	DF	Ulises de la Cruz	8 February 1974 (aged 28)	52	(Scotland) Hibernian
5	MF	Alfonso Obregón	12 May 1972 (aged 30)	40	(Ecuador) LDU Quito
6	DF	Raúl Guerrón	12 October 1976 (aged 25)	23	(Ecuador) Deportivo Quito
7	FW	Nicolás Asencio	26 April 1975 (aged 27)	4	(Ecuador) Barcelona SC
8	MF	Luis Gómez	20 April 1972 (aged 30)	8	(Ecuador) Barcelona SC
9	FW	Iván Kaviedes	24 October 1977 (aged 24)	26	(Ecuador) Barcelona SC
10	MF	Álex Aguinaga (c)	9 July 1968 (aged 33)	92	(Mexico) Necaxa
11	FW	Agustín Delgado	23 December 1974 (aged 27)	46	(England) Southampton
12	GK	Oswaldo Ibarra	8 September 1969 (aged 32)	21	(Ecuador) El Nacional
13	FW	Ángel Fernández	2 August 1971 (aged 30)	68	(Ecuador) El Nacional
14	MF	Juan Carlos Burbano	15 February 1969 (aged 33)	18	(Ecuador) El Nacional
15	DF	Marlon Ayoví	27 September 1971 (aged 30)	26	(Ecuador) Deportivo Quito
16	MF	Cléber Chalá	29 June 1971 (aged 30)	64	(Ecuador) El Nacional
17	DF	Giovanny Espinoza	12 April 1977 (aged 25)	19	(Ecuador) Aucas
18	FW	Carlos Tenorio	14 May 1979 (aged 23)	9	(Ecuador) LDU Quito
19	FW	Édison Méndez	16 March 1979 (aged 23)	24	(Ecuador) Deportivo Quito
20	MF	Edwin Tenorio	16 June 1976 (aged 25)	33	(Ecuador) Barcelona SC
21	MF	Wellington Sánchez	19 June 1974 (aged 27)	35	(Ecuador) Emelec
22	GK	Daniel Viteri	12 December 1981 (aged 20)	0	(Ecuador) Emelec
23	DF	Walter Ayoví	11 August 1979 (aged 22)	2	(Ecuador) Emelec

=== Italy ===
Head coach: Giovanni Trapattoni

No.	Pos.	Player	Date of birth (age)	Caps	Club
1	GK	Gianluigi Buffon	28 January 1978 (aged 24)	26	(Italy) Juventus
2	DF	Christian Panucci	12 April 1973 (aged 29)	24	(Italy) Roma
3	DF	Paolo Maldini (c)	26 June 1968 (aged 33)	122	(Italy) Milan
4	DF	Francesco Coco	8 January 1977 (aged 25)	13	(Spain) Barcelona
5	DF	Fabio Cannavaro	13 September 1973 (aged 28)	58	(Italy) Parma
6	MF	Cristiano Zanetti	14 April 1977 (aged 25)	4	(Italy) Internazionale
7	FW	Alessandro Del Piero	9 November 1974 (aged 27)	49	(Italy) Juventus
8	MF	Gennaro Gattuso	9 January 1978 (aged 24)	13	(Italy) Milan
9	FW	Filippo Inzaghi	9 August 1973 (aged 28)	38	(Italy) Milan
10	FW	Francesco Totti	27 September 1976 (aged 25)	29	(Italy) Roma
11	MF	Cristiano Doni	1 April 1973 (aged 29)	3	(Italy) Atalanta
12	GK	Christian Abbiati	8 July 1977 (aged 24)	0	(Italy) Milan
13	DF	Alessandro Nesta	19 March 1976 (aged 26)	43	(Italy) Lazio
14	MF	Luigi Di Biagio	3 June 1971 (aged 30)	28	(Italy) Internazionale
15	DF	Mark Iuliano	12 August 1973 (aged 28)	16	(Italy) Juventus
16	MF	Angelo Di Livio	26 July 1966 (aged 35)	38	(Italy) Fiorentina
17	MF	Damiano Tommasi	17 May 1974 (aged 28)	14	(Italy) Roma
18	FW	Marco Delvecchio	7 April 1973 (aged 29)	16	(Italy) Roma
19	DF	Gianluca Zambrotta	19 February 1977 (aged 25)	23	(Italy) Juventus
20	FW	Vincenzo Montella	18 June 1974 (aged 27)	14	(Italy) Roma
21	FW	Christian Vieri	12 July 1973 (aged 28)	24	(Italy) Internazionale
22	GK	Francesco Toldo	2 December 1971 (aged 30)	22	(Italy) Internazionale
23	DF	Marco Materazzi	19 August 1973 (aged 28)	7	(Italy) Internazionale

=== Mexico ===
Head coach: Javier Aguirre

No.	Pos.	Player	Date of birth (age)	Caps	Club
1	GK	Óscar Pérez	1 February 1973 (aged 29)	37	(Mexico) Cruz Azul
2	DF	Francisco Gabriel de Anda	5 June 1971 (aged 30)	15	(Mexico) Pachuca
3	MF	Rafael García	14 August 1974 (aged 27)	21	(Mexico) Toluca
4	DF	Rafael Márquez (c)	13 February 1979 (aged 23)	36	(France) Monaco
5	DF	Manuel Vidrio	23 August 1972 (aged 29)	27	(Mexico) Pachuca
6	MF	Gerardo Torrado	30 April 1979 (aged 23)	28	(Spain) Sevilla
7	MF	Ramón Morales	10 October 1975 (aged 26)	17	(Mexico) Guadalajara
8	MF	Alberto García Aspe	11 May 1967 (aged 35)	108	(Mexico) Puebla
9	FW	Jared Borgetti	14 August 1973 (aged 28)	29	(Mexico) Santos Laguna
10	FW	Cuauhtémoc Blanco	17 January 1973 (aged 29)	75	(Spain) Valladolid
11	MF	Braulio Luna	8 September 1974 (aged 27)	15	(Mexico) Necaxa
12	GK	Oswaldo Sánchez	21 September 1973 (aged 28)	22	(Mexico) Guadalajara
13	MF	Sigifredo Mercado	21 December 1968 (aged 33)	18	(Mexico) Atlas
14	MF	Germán Villa	2 April 1973 (aged 29)	46	(Mexico) América
15	FW	Luis Hernández	22 December 1968 (aged 33)	85	(Mexico) América
16	DF	Salvador Carmona	22 August 1975 (aged 26)	56	(Mexico) Toluca
17	FW	Francisco Palencia	28 April 1973 (aged 29)	67	(Spain) Espanyol
18	MF	Johan Rodríguez	15 August 1975 (aged 26)	14	(Mexico) Santos Laguna
19	MF	Gabriel Caballero	5 February 1971 (aged 31)	5	(Mexico) Pachuca
20	DF	Melvin Brown	28 January 1979 (aged 23)	8	(Mexico) Cruz Azul
21	FW	Jesús Arellano	8 May 1973 (aged 29)	49	(Mexico) Monterrey
22	DF	Alberto Rodríguez	1 April 1974 (aged 28)	13	(Mexico) Pachuca
23	GK	Jorge Campos	15 October 1966 (aged 35)	123	(Mexico) Pumas UNAM

== Group H ==
=== Belgium ===
Head coach: Robert Waseige

No.	Pos.	Player	Date of birth (age)	Caps	Club
1	GK	Geert De Vlieger	16 October 1971 (aged 30)	25	(Netherlands) Willem II
2	DF	Eric Deflandre	2 August 1973 (aged 28)	41	(France) Lyon
3	DF	Glen De Boeck	22 August 1971 (aged 30)	33	(Belgium) Anderlecht
4	DF	Eric Van Meir	28 February 1968 (aged 34)	32	(Belgium) Standard Liège
5	DF	Nico Van Kerckhoven	14 December 1970 (aged 31)	40	(Germany) Schalke 04
6	MF	Timmy Simons	11 December 1976 (aged 25)	12	(Belgium) Club Brugge
7	FW	Marc Wilmots (c)	22 February 1969 (aged 33)	66	(Germany) Schalke 04
8	MF	Bart Goor	9 April 1973 (aged 29)	38	(Germany) Hertha BSC
9	FW	Wesley Sonck	9 August 1978 (aged 23)	12	(Belgium) Genk
10	MF	Johan Walem	1 February 1972 (aged 30)	33	(Belgium) Standard Liège
11	FW	Gert Verheyen	20 September 1970 (aged 31)	46	(Belgium) Club Brugge
12	DF	Peter Van der Heyden	16 July 1976 (aged 25)	4	(Belgium) Club Brugge
13	GK	Franky Vandendriessche	7 April 1971 (aged 31)	0	(Belgium) Mouscron
14	MF	Sven Vermant	4 April 1973 (aged 29)	12	(Germany) Schalke 04
15	DF	Jacky Peeters	13 December 1969 (aged 32)	13	(Belgium) Gent
16	DF	Daniel Van Buyten	7 February 1978 (aged 24)	7	(France) Marseille
17	MF	Gaëtan Englebert	11 June 1976 (aged 25)	4	(Belgium) Club Brugge
18	MF	Yves Vanderhaeghe	30 January 1970 (aged 32)	30	(Belgium) Anderlecht
19	MF	Bernd Thijs	28 June 1978 (aged 23)	2	(Belgium) Genk
20	FW	Branko Strupar	9 February 1970 (aged 32)	14	(England) Derby County
21	MF	Danny Boffin	10 July 1965 (aged 36)	52	(Belgium) Sint-Truiden
22	FW	Mbo Mpenza	4 December 1976 (aged 25)	26	(Belgium) Mouscron
23	GK	Frédéric Herpoel	16 August 1974 (aged 27)	7	(Belgium) Gent

=== Japan ===
Head coach: (France) Philippe Troussier

No.	Pos.	Player	Date of birth (age)	Caps	Club
1	GK	Yoshikatsu Kawaguchi	15 August 1975 (aged 26)	43	(England) Portsmouth
2	DF	Yutaka Akita	6 August 1970 (aged 31)	38	(Japan) Kashima Antlers
3	DF	Naoki Matsuda	14 March 1977 (aged 25)	24	(Japan) Yokohama F. Marinos
4	DF	Ryuzo Morioka	7 October 1975 (aged 26)	32	(Japan) Shimizu S-Pulse
5	MF	Junichi Inamoto	18 September 1979 (aged 22)	22	(England) Arsenal
6	DF	Toshihiro Hattori	23 September 1973 (aged 28)	35	(Japan) Júbilo Iwata
7	MF	Hidetoshi Nakata	22 January 1977 (aged 25)	39	(Italy) Parma
8	MF	Hiroaki Morishima	30 April 1972 (aged 30)	57	(Japan) Cerezo Osaka
9	FW	Akinori Nishizawa	18 June 1976 (aged 25)	24	(Japan) Cerezo Osaka
10	FW	Masashi Nakayama	23 September 1967 (aged 34)	47	(Japan) Júbilo Iwata
11	FW	Takayuki Suzuki	5 June 1976 (aged 25)	10	(Japan) Kashima Antlers
12	GK	Seigo Narazaki	15 April 1976 (aged 26)	15	(Japan) Nagoya Grampus Eight
13	FW	Atsushi Yanagisawa	27 May 1977 (aged 25)	22	(Japan) Kashima Antlers
14	MF	Alessandro Santos	20 July 1977 (aged 24)	0	(Japan) Shimizu S-Pulse
15	MF	Takashi Fukunishi	1 September 1976 (aged 25)	5	(Japan) Júbilo Iwata
16	DF	Kōji Nakata	9 July 1979 (aged 22)	20	(Japan) Kashima Antlers
17	DF	Tsuneyasu Miyamoto (c)	7 February 1977 (aged 25)	5	(Japan) Gamba Osaka
18	MF	Shinji Ono	27 September 1979 (aged 22)	21	(Netherlands) Feyenoord
19	MF	Mitsuo Ogasawara	5 April 1979 (aged 23)	0	(Japan) Kashima Antlers
20	MF	Tomokazu Myojin	24 January 1978 (aged 24)	16	(Japan) Kashiwa Reysol
21	MF	Kazuyuki Toda	30 December 1977 (aged 24)	10	(Japan) Shimizu S-Pulse
22	MF	Daisuke Ichikawa	14 May 1980 (aged 22)	1	(Japan) Shimizu S-Pulse
23	GK	Hitoshi Sogahata	2 August 1979 (aged 22)	1	(Japan) Kashima Antlers

=== Russia ===
Head coach: Oleg Romantsev

No.	Pos.	Player	Date of birth (age)	Caps	Club
1	GK	Ruslan Nigmatullin	7 October 1974 (aged 27)	20	(Italy) Hellas Verona
2	DF	Yuri Kovtun	5 January 1970 (aged 32)	44	(Russia) Spartak Moscow
3	DF	Yuriy Nikiforov	16 September 1970 (aged 31)	56	(Netherlands) PSV Eindhoven
4	MF	Alexey Smertin	1 May 1975 (aged 27)	25	(France) Bordeaux
5	DF	Andrei Solomatin	9 September 1975 (aged 26)	5	(Russia) CSKA Moscow
6	MF	Igor Semshov	6 April 1978 (aged 24)	2	(Russia) Torpedo Moscow
7	DF	Viktor Onopko (c)	14 October 1969 (aged 32)	97	(Spain) Oviedo
8	MF	Valery Karpin	2 February 1969 (aged 33)	69	(Spain) Celta Vigo
9	MF	Yegor Titov	29 May 1976 (aged 26)	30	(Russia) Spartak Moscow
10	MF	Aleksandr Mostovoi	22 August 1968 (aged 33)	59	(Spain) Celta Vigo
11	FW	Vladimir Beschastnykh	1 April 1974 (aged 28)	64	(Russia) Spartak Moscow
12	GK	Stanislav Cherchesov	2 September 1963 (aged 38)	49	(Austria) Tirol Innsbruck
13	DF	Vyacheslav Dayev	6 September 1972 (aged 29)	7	(Russia) CSKA Moscow
14	DF	Igor Chugainov	6 April 1970 (aged 32)	30	(Russia) Uralan Elista
15	MF	Dmitri Alenichev	20 October 1972 (aged 29)	43	(Portugal) Porto
16	FW	Aleksandr Kerzhakov	27 November 1982 (aged 19)	3	(Russia) Zenit Saint Petersburg
17	MF	Sergei Semak	27 February 1976 (aged 26)	31	(Russia) CSKA Moscow
18	DF	Dmitri Sennikov	24 June 1976 (aged 25)	4	(Russia) Lokomotiv Moscow
19	FW	Ruslan Pimenov	25 November 1981 (aged 20)	1	(Russia) Lokomotiv Moscow
20	MF	Marat Izmailov	21 September 1982 (aged 19)	8	(Russia) Lokomotiv Moscow
21	MF	Dmitri Khokhlov	22 December 1975 (aged 26)	39	(Spain) Real Sociedad
22	FW	Dmitri Sychev	26 October 1983 (aged 18)	3	(Russia) Spartak Moscow
23	GK	Aleksandr Filimonov	15 October 1973 (aged 28)	16	(Russia) Uralan Elista

Note: caps include those for USSR, CIS, and Russia, while those for other countries, such as Ukraine, are not counted.

=== Tunisia ===
Head coach: Ammar Souayah

No.	Pos.	Player	Date of birth (age)	Caps	Club
1	GK	Ali Boumnijel	13 April 1966 (aged 36)	14	(France) Bastia
2	DF	Khaled Badra (c)	8 April 1973 (aged 29)	72	(Tunisia) Espérance de Tunis
3	MF	Zoubeir Baya	15 May 1971 (aged 31)	77	(Turkey) Beşiktaş
4	DF	Mohamed Mkacher	25 May 1975 (aged 27)	15	(Tunisia) Étoile du Sahel
5	FW	Ziad Jaziri	12 July 1978 (aged 23)	26	(Tunisia) Étoile du Sahel
6	DF	Hatem Trabelsi	25 January 1977 (aged 25)	27	(Netherlands) Ajax
7	FW	Imed Mhedhebi	22 March 1976 (aged 26)	30	(Italy) Genoa
8	MF	Hassen Gabsi	23 February 1974 (aged 28)	48	(Italy) Genoa
9	FW	Riadh Jelassi	7 July 1971 (aged 30)	20	(Tunisia) Club Africain
10	MF	Kaies Ghodhbane	7 January 1976 (aged 26)	62	(Tunisia) Étoile du Sahel
11	FW	Adel Sellimi	16 November 1972 (aged 29)	64	(Germany) SC Freiburg
12	DF	Raouf Bouzaiene	16 August 1970 (aged 31)	39	(Italy) Genoa
13	MF	Riadh Bouazizi	8 April 1973 (aged 29)	47	(Turkey) Bursaspor
14	DF	Hamdi Marzouki	23 January 1977 (aged 25)	7	(Tunisia) Club Africain
15	DF	Radhi Jaïdi	30 August 1975 (aged 26)	40	(Tunisia) Espérance de Tunis
16	GK	Hassen Bejaoui	14 February 1975 (aged 27)	2	(Tunisia) Bizertin
17	DF	Tarek Thabet	16 August 1971 (aged 30)	70	(Tunisia) Espérance de Tunis
18	MF	Selim Benachour	8 September 1981 (aged 20)	3	(France) Martigues
19	DF	Emir Mkademi	20 August 1978 (aged 23)	9	(Tunisia) Étoile du Sahel
20	FW	Ali Zitouni	11 January 1981 (aged 21)	23	(Tunisia) Espérance de Tunis
21	MF	Mourad Melki	9 May 1975 (aged 27)	11	(Tunisia) Espérance de Tunis
22	GK	Ahmed El-Jaouachi	13 July 1975 (aged 26)	0	(Tunisia) Monastir
23	DF	José Clayton	21 March 1974 (aged 28)	12	(Tunisia) Espérance de Tunis

== Age ==
=== Players ===
- Oldest: (Denmark) Jan Heintze (38 years, 287 days)
- Youngest: (Nigeria) Femi Opabunmi (17 years, 89 days)

=== Captains ===
- Oldest: (Denmark) Jan Heintze (38 years, 287 days)
- Youngest: (Mexico) Rafael Márquez (23 years, 107 days)

=== Goalkeepers ===
- Oldest: (Russia) Stanislav Cherchesov (38 years, 271 days)
- Youngest: (Nigeria) Austin Ejide (18 years, 53 days)

== Player representation by league ==
Country	Players	Percent	Outside national squad
Total	736		
England	103	13.99%	81
Italy	75	10.19%	53
Germany	59	8.02%	39
Spain	58	7.88%	36
France	56	7.61%	51
Mexico	25	3.40%	6
Japan	25	3.40%	6
Belgium	25	3.40%	10
Saudi Arabia	24	3.13%	1
China	21	2.85%	1
Others	266	36.14%	

The Saudi Arabian squad was the only one made up entirely of players from their country's domestic league and the only one with no players from European clubs.

The Cameroonian squad were made up entirely of players employed by overseas clubs, while the Irish squad was made up entirely by players in the English league.

Although the Netherlands and Greece failed to qualify for the finals, their domestic leagues were represented by 18 and 10 players respectively.

Altogether, there were 43 national leagues who had players in the tournament.

== Coaches representation by country ==
Nº	Country	Coaches
3	France	Roger Lemerre, Bruno Metsu (Senegal), Philippe Troussier (Japan)
3	Sweden	Sven-Göran Eriksson (England), Lars Lagerbäck, Tommy Söderberg
2	Germany	Winfried Schäfer (Cameroon), Rudi Völler
2	Italy	Cesare Maldini (Paraguay), Giovanni Trapattoni
1	Argentina	Marcelo Bielsa
1	Belgium	Robert Waseige
1	Brazil	Luiz Felipe Scolari
1	Colombia	Hernán Darío Gómez (Ecuador)
1	Costa Rica	Alexandre Guimarães
1	Croatia	Mirko Jozić
1	Denmark	Morten Olsen
1	(Federal Republic of Yugoslavia) FR Yugoslavia	Bora Milutinović (China PR)
1	Mexico	Javier Aguirre
1	Netherlands	Guus Hiddink (South Korea)
1	Nigeria	Festus Onigbinde
1	Poland	Jerzy Engel
1	Portugal	António Oliveira
1	Republic of Ireland	Mick McCarthy
1	Russia	Oleg Romantsev
1	Saudi Arabia	Nasser Al-Johar
1	Slovenia	Srečko Katanec
1	South Africa	Jomo Sono
1	Spain	José Antonio Camacho
1	Tunisia	Ammar Souayah
1	Turkey	Şenol Güneş
1	United States	Bruce Arena
1	Uruguay	Víctor Púa
