= Juan Rodríguez =

Juan Rodríguez may refer to:

== Arts and entertainment ==
- Juan Rodríguez Botas (1880–1917), Canarian impressionist painter
- Juan Rodríguez de la Cámara del Padrón (1390–1450), Spanish poet
- Juan Rodríguez Freyle (1566–1642), early Colombian writer (El Carnero)
- Juan Rodríguez Juárez (1675–1728), Spanish painter
- Juan Rodríguez Pérez (born 1952), Peruvian writer
- Juan Manuel Rodriguez (writer) (born 1945), Ecuadorian professor and author

== Politics and law ==
- Juan Rodríguez Ballesteros (fl. 1808), Spanish colonial administrator as regency Governor of Chile and Panama
- Juan Rodríguez Nadruz (1919–?), Chilean politician
- Juan Carlos Rodríguez Ibarra (born 1948), Spanish politician
- Juan Manuel Rodríguez (1771–1847), Salvadoran revolutionary against Spain and later president of the State of El Salvador (briefly in 1824)

== Sports ==
=== Association football (soccer) ===
- Juan Rodríguez Aretio (1922–1973), Spanish footballer
- Juan Rodríguez (Argentine footballer) (born 1994), Argentine football centre-back
- Juan Rodríguez (footballer, born 1982), Spanish football defensive midfielder
- Juan Rodríguez (footballer, born 1995), Spanish football centre-back
- Juan Rodríguez (footballer, born 2005), Uruguayan football centre-back
- Juan Rodríguez Vega (1944–2021), Chilean football manager and former defender
- Juan Carlos Rodríguez Moreno (born 1965), known as Juan Carlos, Spanish football left-back
- Juan José Rodríguez (Argentine footballer) (1937–1993), Argentine football forward
- Juan José Rodríguez (Costa Rican footballer) (born 1967), Costa Rican football left-back
- Juan Josué Rodríguez (born 1988), Honduran football forward
- Juan Manuel Rodríguez (football manager), Spanish football manager
- Juan Pablo Rodríguez (born 1979), Mexican football midfielder

=== Combat sports ===
- Juan Rodríguez (wrestler) (born 1958), Cuban Olympic wrestler
- Juan Carlos Rodríguez (boxer) (born 1990), Venezuelan boxer
- Juan Francisco Rodríguez (1949–2019), Spanish boxer

=== Other sports ===
- Juan Rodríguez (beach volleyball) (born 1979), Mexican beach volleyball player & medalist in 2002 Central American and Caribbean Games
- Juan Rodríguez (rower) (1928–2019), Uruguayan rower
- Juan Francisco Rodríguez (baseball) (born 1960), Mexican baseball player and manager
- Juan Ignacio Rodríguez, (born 1992), Spanish archer
- Juan Miguel Rodríguez (born 1967), Cuban sports shooter
- Chi-Chi Rodríguez (Juan Antonio Rodríguez, 1935–2024), American Puerto Rican golfer

== Others ==
- Juan Rodríguez Cabrillo (died 1543), Portuguese sailor and soldier
- Juan Rodríguez the Deaf (fl. 1520s), Spanish sailor and survivor of Magellan expedition
- Juan Rodríguez de Fonseca (1451–1524), Spanish religious leader and government administrator
- Juan Rodriguez (trader) (fl. 1610s), first non-native resident of Manhattan Island

== Places ==
- Juan Rodríguez Clara, municipality in the Mexican state of Veracruz

== See also ==
- Juan Andrés Rodríguez (disambiguation)
- Juan Antonio Rodríguez (disambiguation)
- Juan Carlos Rodríguez (disambiguation)
- Juan José Rodríguez (disambiguation)
- Juan Pablo Rodríguez (disambiguation)
