= Juan José Rodríguez =

Juan José Rodríguez may refer to:

- Juan José Rodríguez (Argentine footballer) (1937–1993), Argentine football forward
- Juan José Rodríguez (Costa Rican footballer) (born 1967), Costa Rican football left-back
- Juan José Rodríguez Pérez, Puerto Rican politician
- Juan José Rodríguez Prats (born 1946), Mexican politician
- Juan José Rodríguez y Prieto (born 1971), Spanish comic book artist, known by his pen name Juan José Ryp

== See also ==
- Juan Rodríguez (disambiguation)
