= Tamayo (surname) =

Tamayo is a surname. Notable people with the surname include:

- Arnaldo Tamayo Méndez (born 1942), Cuban cosmonaut
- Francisco Tamayo (1902–1985), Venezuelan botanist
- Franz Tamayo (1878–1956), Bolivian intellectual
- Gustavo Tamayo, Colombian ophthalmologist
- Jeff Tamayo, pioneer of Taekwondo and military officer in the Philippines
- Jonathan Tamayo (born 1984), American poker player
- José Luis Tamayo (1858–1947), Ecuadorian president
- Juan José Tamayo (born 1946), Spanish theologian
- Manuel Tamayo y Baus (1829–1898), Spanish dramatist
- María Fernanda Tamayo, Ecuadorian police official
- Misael Tamayo Hernández (1952–2006), Mexican journalist
- Pascual Tamayo (born 1912), Chilean politician
- Rufino Tamayo (1899–1991), Mexican painter
