= Juan Carlos Rodríguez =

Juan Carlos Rodríguez may refer to:

- Juan Carlos (footballer, born 1965), Spanish footballer
- Juan Carlos Rodríguez (boxer) (born 1990), Venezuelan boxer
- Juan Carlos Rodríguez Ibarra (born 1948), Spanish politician
- Juan Carlos Rodríguez (judoka) (born 1956), Spanish Olympic judoka
- Juan Carlos Rodríguez (singer), singer with Tercer Cielo

== See also ==
- Juan Rodríguez (disambiguation)
- Juan Carlos (disambiguation)
