= John Charles (disambiguation) =

John Charles (1931–2004) was a Welsh footballer.

John Charles may also refer to:

== People ==
=== Sportspeople ===
- John Charles (English footballer), active 1912–1924
- John Charles (footballer, born 1935) (1935–1995), Australian footballer for Fitzroy
- John Charles (footballer, born 1942), Australian footballer for Footscray
- John Charles (footballer, born 1944) (1944–2002), first black player to represent both England and West Ham Youth teams
- John Charles (American football) (1944–2019), American football cornerback and safety

=== Other people ===
- Juan Carlos I of Spain (born 1938)
- John Charles (physician) (1893–1971), British physician
- John Charles (composer) (1940–2024), New Zealand composer, conductor, and orchestrator
- John Charles, Count Palatine of Gelnhausen (1638–1704), German prince
- John Leslie Charles (1892–1992), Chief Engineer for the Canadian National Railway

== Others ==
- John Charles or Condea verticillata, a species of flowering plant in the family Lamiaceae

== See also ==
- Jack Charles (disambiguation)
- Jean-Charles
- Juan Carlos (disambiguation)
