= Tamayo =

Tamayo may refer to:

- Tamayo (surname), a surname
- Tamayo, Dominican Republic, a municipality in the Dominican Republic
- Tamayo (Demon Slayer: Kimetsu no Yaiba), a character in the manga series Demon Slayer: Kimetsu no Yaiba

== People with the given name ==
- Tamayo Akiyama, Japanese author
- Tamayo Kawamoto (河本 圭代), Japanese video game composer
- Tamayo Marukawa, Japanese politician
- Miyagi Tamayo (宮城タマヨ, 1892 - 1960), Japanese social worker and politician
- Tamayo Perry (1975–2024), American professional surfer, lifeguard and actor

== See also ==
- Rincón de Tamayo, a community in Celaya, Guanajuato in Mexico
