= Jack Charles (disambiguation) =

Jack Charles (1943–2022) was an Australian actor and activist.

Jack Charles may also refer to:

- Jack Charles (rugby league), English rugby league footballer

== See also ==
- Jacques Charles (1746–1823), French inventor, scientist, mathematician
- John Charles (disambiguation)
- Charles Jack (1810–1896), Irish farmer and landowner
