= Juan José =

Juan José may refer to:

- Juan José (given name)
- Juan José (play), an 1895 play by Joaquín Dicenta
- Juan José (telenovela), a 1964 Mexican telenovela
- Juan José (footballer, born 1957), Spanish footballer
