= Juan Pablo Rodríguez (disambiguation) =

Juan Pablo Rodríguez (born 1979) is a Mexican football midfielder

Juan Pablo Rodríguez may also refer to:

- Juan Pablo Rodríguez Barragán (born 1956), Colombian Army general
- Juan Pablo Rodríguez (footballer, born 1982), Uruguayan football midfielder
