= Juan José Cañas =

Juan José Cañas may refer to:

- Juan José Cañas (footballer) (born 1972), Spanish retired professional footballer
- Juan José Cañas (writer) (1826–1918), Salvadoran poet, military officer, politician, and diplomat
