= Zafer Özgültekin =

Turkish footballer (born 1975)

Personal information
- Full name: Zafer Özgültekin
- Date of birth: 10 March 1975 (age 51)
- Place of birth: Sivas, Turkey
- Height: 1.83 m (6 ft 0 in)
- Position: Goalkeeper

Senior career*
Years	Team	Apps	(Gls)
1995–1997	İskenderunspor	35	(0)
1997–1999	Karabükspor	11	(0)
1999–2005	MKE Ankaragücü	111	(0)
2005–2007	Kayseri Erciyesspor	6	(0)
2007	Eskişehirspor	14	(0)
2007–2009	MKE Ankaragücü	4	(0)
2009–2010	Çaykur Rizespor	17	(0)
2010–2011	Denizlispor	4	(0)
Total		202	(0)

International career
2001–2010	Turkey	5	(0)
Medal record
Representing Turkey
Bronze medal – third place	FIFA World Cup	2002
- * Club domestic league appearances and goals

Zafer Özgültekin (born 10 March 1975) is a Turkish former professional footballer who played as a goalkeeper. He was part of the Turkey national team that achieved third place at the 2002 FIFA World Cup.

== Honours ==
Turkey

- FIFA World Cup third place: 2002

=== Orders ===
- Turkish State Medal of Distinguished Service
