= Juan José Ossandón =

Chilean footballer (born 1977)

Personal information
- Full name: Juan José Ossandón Briceño
- Date of birth: 2 November 1977 (age 49)
- Place of birth: Arica, Chile
- Height: 1.80 m (5 ft 11 in)
- Position: Forward

Senior career*
Years	Team	Apps	(Gls)
1998	Regional Atacama		
1999–2000	Deportes Copiapó	–	(–)
2000–2003	Palestino	23	(6)
2004	Deportes La Serena	11	(2)
2005	Magallanes	22	(2)
2006	Universidad de Concepción	1	(0)
2006	Alianza		
2007–2011	Deportes Copiapó	150	(48)
2012	Lota Schwager	2	(0)

Managerial career
- Tierra Amarilla (city team)
- * Club domestic league appearances and goals

Juan José Ossandón Briceño (born 2 November 1977) is a Chilean former professional footballer who played as a forward.

== Playing career ==
Born in Arica, Chile, Ossandón was raised in Copiapó, playing for the local clubs Regional Atacama in the Primera B and Deportes Copiapó in the Tercera División in his early career. He became the Tercera División top goalscorer twice; he moved to Palestino in 2000.

He is considered a historical player for Deportes Copiapó.

== Coaching career ==
As a football coach, Ossandón has coached the Tierra Amarilla city team.
