= Dejan Nemec =

Slovenian footballer

Personal information
- Date of birth: 1 March 1977 (age 49)
- Place of birth: Murska Sobota, SFR Yugoslavia
- Height: 1.84 m (6 ft 0 in)
- Position: Goalkeeper

Youth career
- –1991: Beltinci
- 1991–1995: Mura

Senior career*
Years	Team	Apps	(Gls)
1995–2000	Mura	103	(0)
2000–2003	Club Brugge	20	(0)
2004–2009	Domžale	129	(0)
2009–2012	Beltinci		
2012–2013	Kobilje		
2014–2016	Beltinci	1	(0)

International career
1994	Slovenia U18	2	(0)
1996–1999	Slovenia U21	18	(0)
2002	Slovenia	1	(0)
- * Club domestic league appearances and goals

Dejan Nemec (born 1 March 1977) is a Slovenian retired footballer who played as a goalkeeper.

== Club career ==
Nemec played for Mura between 1995 and 2000 and in Belgium for Club Brugge between 2000 and 2003.

== International career ==
Nemec played for the Slovenia national football team (1 cap against Honduras in 2002) and was the third goalkeeper (behind Marko Simeunovič and Mladen Dabanovič) in the Euro 2000 and 2002 FIFA World Cup team squads.

== Honours ==
Club Brugge

- Belgian Cup: 2001–02
