= Juan José Urráburu =

Spanish Jesuit and philosopher

Juan José Urráburu (1844–1904) was a Spanish Jesuit and a scholastic philosopher who worked for some time as a professor of philosophy at the Gregorian University in Rome. Beginning in 1890, he published eight large volumes treating of Scholastic philosophy under the title Institutiones Philosophicae. The last volume appeared in 1900, though he reworked the Institutiones into the slightly abbreviated five-volume Compendium Philosophiae Scholasticae.

== Biography ==
He joined the Society of Jesus on May 3, 1860, in Loyola. After completing his studies, he began teaching rhetoric and humanities. He also taught philosophy and theology in Poyanne, France. In 1878, Urráburu was appointed to teach philosophy at the Gregorian University. Nine years later, he returned to Spain to take on administrative roles, serving as rector of the College of Valladolid (1887–1890), the Colegio Máximo de Oña (1891–1897), and the Jesuit seminary of Salamanca (1898–1902).

During this period, he published his renowned manuals Institutiones Philosophicae (8 volumes, Valladolid, 1890–1900), later summarised in Compendium Philosophiae Scholasticae (5 volumes, Valladolid, 1902–1904; republished in 1924 and 1927). These works integrated into the Scholastic tradition the elements he found valuable in rationalism and empiricism while rejecting what he deemed insufficient in these schools of thought.

The influence of Thomas Aquinas and Francisco Suárez is predominant in his writings, although traces of the thought of René Descartes and Immanuel Kant are also noticeable.

== Works ==
- 1890, Institutiones Philosophicae, Volumen Primum: Logica
- 1891, Institutiones Philosophicae, Volumen Secundum: Ontologia
- 1892, Institutiones Philosophicae, Volumen Tertium: Cosmologia
- 1894, Institutiones Philosophicae, Volumen Quartum: Psychologiae, Pars Prima
- 1896, Institutiones Philosophicae, Volumen Quintum: Psychologiae, Pars Secunda
- 1898, Institutiones Philosophicae, Volumen Sextum: Psychologiae, Pars Secunda
- 1899, Institutiones Philosophicae, Volumen Septimum: Theodiceae, Primum
- 1900, Institutiones Philosophicae, Volumen Octavum: Theodiceae, Secundum
