= Juan Carlos (disambiguation) =

Juan Carlos I of Spain (born 1938) is a former king of Spain.

Juan Carlos may also refer to:

- Juan Carlos (footballer, born 1945) (1945–2012), Spanish footballer
- Juan Domecq or Juan Carlos (born 1950), Cuban basketball player
- Juan Carlos (footballer, born 1956), Spanish footballer
- Juan Carlos (footballer, born 1965), Spanish footballer and manager
- Juan Carlos (weightlifter) (born 1965), Spanish Olympic weightlifter
- Juan Carlos (footballer, born 1973), Spanish footballer
- Juan Belencoso or Juan Carlos (born 1981), Spanish footballer
- Juan Carlos (footballer, born 1987), Spanish footballer
- Jake Cuenca or Juan Carlos (born 1987), American-Filipino actor and footballer
- Juan Carlos (footballer, born 1988), Spanish footballer
- Juan Carlos (footballer, born 1990), Spanish footballer
- Spanish amphibious assault ship Juan Carlos I
- Juan Carlos I Antarctic Base
- Juan Carlos I Park, a Madrid park

== People with the given names ==
=== Footballers ===
- Juan Carlos Ablanedo (born 1963), Spanish footballer
- Juan Carlos Almada (born 1962), Argentine footballer
- Juan Carlos Álvarez (Spanish footballer) (born 1954), Spanish footballer and manager
- Juan Carlos Anangonó (born 1989), Ecuadorian footballer
- Juan Carlos Arce (born 1985), Bolivian footballer
- Juan Carlos Arguedas (born 1970), Costa Rican footballer and manager
- Juan Carlos Arteche (1957–2010), Spanish footballer
- Juan Carlos Burbano (born 1969), Ecuadorian footballer and manager
- Juan Carlos Buzzetti (born 1945), Uruguayan football manager
- Juan Carlos Cacho (born 1982), Mexican footballer
- Juan Carlos Calvo (1906–1977), Uruguayan footballer
- Juan Carlos Carone (born 1942), Argentine footballer
- Juan Carlos Ceballos (born 1983), Spanish footballer
- Juan Carlos Chávez (born 1967), Mexican footballer and manager
- Juan Carlos Corazzo (1907–1986), Uruguayan footballer and manager
- Juan Carlos de la Barrera (born 1983), Mexican footballer
- Juan Carlos de Lima (born 1962), Uruguayan footballer
- Juan Carlos Enríquez (born 1990), Mexican footballer
- Juan Carlos Espinoza (Chilean footballer) (born 1986)
- Juan Carlos Espinoza (Honduran footballer) (born 1958), Honduran footballer and manager
- Juan Carlos Franco (born 1973), Paraguayan footballer
- Juan Carlos Garay (born 1968), Ecuadorian footballer
- Juan Carlos García (Honduran footballer) (1988–2018)
- Juan Carlos García (Mexican footballer) (born 1985)
- Juan Carlos García Rulfo (born 1980), Mexican footballer
- Juan Carlos Garrido (born 1969), Spanish football manager
- Juan Carlos González (1924–2010), Uruguayan footballer
- Juan Carlos González (Chilean footballer) (born 1968)
- Juan Carlos Henao (born 1971), Colombian footballer
- Juan Carlos Ibáñez (1969–2015), Argentine footballer
- Juan Carlos La Rosa (born 1980), Peruvian footballer
- Juan Carlos Leaño (born 1977), Mexican footballer
- Juan Carlos Lorenzo (1922–2001), Argentine footballer and manager
- Juan Carlos Loustau (born 1947), Argentine football referee
- Juan Carlos Mandiá (born 1967), Spanish footballer and manager
- Juan Carlos Mariño (born 1982), Peruvian footballer
- Juan Carlos Martín Corral (born 1988), Spanish footballer
- Juan Carlos Medina (born 1983), Mexican footballer
- Juan Carlos Morrone (born 1941), Argentine footballer and manager
- Juan Carlos Moscoso (born 1982), Salvadoran footballer
- Juan Carlos Muñoz (footballer, born 1919) (1919–2009), Argentine footballer
- Juan Carlos Núñez (born 1983), Mexican footballer
- Juan Carlos Oblitas (born 1951), Peruvian footballer and manager
- Juan Carlos Oleniak (born 1942), Argentine footballer
- Juan Carlos Oliva (born 1965), Spanish football manager
- Juan Carlos Orellana (born 1955), Chilean footballer
- Juan Carlos Paredes (born 1989), Ecuadorian footballer
- Juan Carlos Real Ruiz (born 1991), Spanish footballer
- Juan Carlos Reyes (footballer) (born 1976), Uruguayan footballer
- Juan Carlos Ríos Vidal (born 1964), Spanish footballer and manager
- Juan Carlos Rojas (footballer) (born 1984), Mexican footballer
- Juan Carlos Rojo (born 1959), Spanish footballer and manager
- Juan Carlos Sánchez (footballer, born 1956) (born 1956), Argentine-Bolivian footballer
- Juan Carlos Sánchez Martínez (born 1987), Spanish footballer
- Juan Carlos Sarnari (born 1942), Argentine footballer and manager
- Juan Carlos Touriño (born 1944), Spanish-Argentine footballer and manager
- Juan Carlos Unzué (born 1967), Spanish footballer and manager
- Juan Carlos Valenzuela (footballer) (born 1984), Mexican footballer
- Juan Carlos Valerón (born 1975), Spanish footballer
- Juan Carlos Vidal (born 1954), Spanish footballer
- Juan Carlos Villamayor (born 1969), Paraguayan footballer

=== Other sportspeople ===
- Juan Carlos Báguena (born 1967), Spanish tennis player and coach
- Juan Carlos Bianchi (born 1970), Venezuelan tennis player
- Juan Carlos Blum (born 1994), Mexican stock car racing driver
- Juan Carlos Candelo (born 1974), Colombian boxer
- Juan Carlos Cardona (born 1974), Colombian marathon runner
- Juan Carlos de la Ossa (born 1976), Spanish middle-distance runner
- Juan Carlos Domínguez (born 1971), Spanish bicycle road racer
- Juan Carlos Fernández (weightlifter) (born 1976), Colombian weightlifter
- Juan Carlos Giménez Ferreyra (born 1960), Paraguayan boxer
- Juan Carlos Higuero (born 1978), Spanish middle-distance runner
- Juan Carlos Infante (born 1981), Venezuelan baseball player
- Juan Carlos Lemus (born 1965), Cuban boxer
- Juan Carlos Moreno (baseball) (born 1975), Cuban baseball player
- Juan Carlos Nájera (born 1981), Guatemala triple jumper and coach
- Juan Carlos Navarro (basketball) (born 1980), Spanish basketball player
- Juan Carlos Oviedo (born 1982), Dominican Republic baseball player
- Juan Carlos Payano (born 1984), Dominican Republic boxer
- Juan Carlos Pérez (footballer) (born 1972), Ecuadorian footballer
- Juan Carlos Pérez (sport shooter) (born 1981), Bolivian trap shooter
- Juan Carlos Ramírez (born 1977), Mexican boxer
- Juan Carlos Romero (athlete) (born 1977), Mexican long-distance runner
- Juan Carlos Sáez (born 1991), Chilean tennis player
- Juan Carlos Sánchez, Jr. (born 1991), Mexican boxer
- Juan Carlos Spir (born 1990), Colombian tennis player
- Juan Carlos Stevens (born 1968), Cuban archer
- Juan Carlos Vallejo (born 1963), Spanish swimmer
- Juan Carlos Zabala (1911–1983), Argentine athlete

=== Creative arts ===
- Juan Carlos Alarcón (born 1971), Venezuelan actor
- Juan Carlos Altavista (1929–1989), Argentine actor and comedian
- Juan Carlos Barreto (born 1957), Mexican actor
- Juan Carlos Calabró (1934–2013), Argentine actor and comedian
- Juan Carlos Calderón (1938–2012), Spanish singer-songwriter
- Juan Carlos Cobián (1888–1942), Argentine bandleader and tango composer
- Juan Carlos Cremata Malberti (born 1961), Cuban film director
- Juan Carlos Distéfano (1933–2026), Argentine sculptor
- Juan Carlos Echeverry (singer) (born 1971), Colombian tenor
- Juan Carlos Fresnadillo (born 1967), Spanish film director
- Juan Carlos García (actor) (born 1971), Venezuelan actor
- Karla Sofía Gascón (formerly Juan Carlos Gascón, born 1972), Spanish actress
- Juan Carlos Gené (1929–2012), Argentine actor and playwright
- Juan Carlos Macías (born 1945), Argentine film editor
- Juan Carlos Rodríguez (boxer) (born 1990), Venezuelan boxer
- Juan Carlos Tabío (born 1942), Cuban film director
- Juan Carlos Zaldívar, Cuban-American filmmaker

=== Politicians ===
- Juan Carlos Blanco Fernández (1847–1910), Uruguayan politician
- Juan Carlos Echeverry (politician) (born 1962), Colombian economist and politician
- Juan Carlos Eguren (born 1965), Peruvian politician
- Juan Carlos Esguerra Portocarrero (born 1949), Colombian politician
- Juan Carlos García Padilla (born 1968), Puerto Rican politician
- Juan Carlos Latorre (born 1949), Chilean politician
- Juan Carlos Marino (Argentine politician) (born 1963)
- Juan Carlos Marino (Argentine politician) (born 1963), Argentine politician
- Juan Carlos Mendoza García (born 1975), Costa Rican politician
- Juan Carlos Navarro (politician) (born 1961), Panamanian politician and businessman
- Juan Carlos Muñoz Márquez (born 1950), Mexican politician
- Juan Carlos Onganía (1914–1995), Argentine soldier and politician
- Juan Carlos Pérez Góngora (born 1960), Mexican politician
- Juan Carlos Pinzón (born 1971), Colombian politician
- Juan Carlos Reyes (governor) (died 2007), Argentine politician
- Juan Carlos Robinson Agramonte (born 1956), Cuban politician
- Juan Carlos Rodríguez Ibarra (born 1948), Spanish politician
- Juan Carlos Romero (politician) (born 1950), Argentine politician
- Juan Carlos Romero Hicks (born 1955), Mexican politician
- Juan Carlos Varela (born 1963), Panamanian politician
- Juan Carlos Wasmosy (born 1938), Paraguayan politician

=== Other people ===
- Juan Carlos Caballero Vega (1900–2010), Mexican revolutionary
- Juan Carlos de Aréizaga (died 1816), Spanish general
- Juan Carlos Ortíz, advertising executive in the American Advertising Federation Hall of Fame
- Juan Carlos Pavía, Puerto Rican civil servant
- Juan Carlos Izpisua Belmonte, Spanish biochemist

=== Fictional characters ===
- Juan Carlos Bodoque, from the Chilean television series 31 Minutos

== See also ==
- Juan Karlos, a Filipino rock band
  - Juan Karlos Labajo (born 2001), Filipino singer and lead vocalist of the aforementioned band
- Estadio Juan Carlos Durán, a stadium in Bolivia
- John Charles (disambiguation)
