= John Charles (footballer, born 1942) =

Australian rules footballer

Personal information
- Full name: John Charles
- Born: 21 September 1942
- Original team: North Footscray
- Height: 187 cm (6 ft 2 in)
- Weight: 83 kg (183 lb)

Playing career^{1}
Years	Club	Games (Goals)
1964–66	Footscray	17 (4)
- ^{1} Playing statistics correct to the end of 1966.

John Charles (born 21 September 1942) is a former Australian rules footballer who played with Footscray in the Victorian Football League (VFL).
