= María Fernanda Tamayo =

Ecuadorian law enforcement official

- Born: María Fernanda Tamayo Rivera; 20th century Shell Mera, Ecuador
- Occupation: Police official
- Employer: National Police of Ecuador
- Spouse: Fausto Salinas
- Children: 4

María Fernanda Tamayo Rivera is an Ecuadorian law enforcement official, the first woman to become the country's inspector general of police.

== Early years ==
María Fernanda Tamayo was born in Shell Mera, Pastaza Province, Ecuador. She has three brothers and two sisters. Since she was 8 years old, she showed signs of her vocation to join the police force. She was inspired by watching the American TV series Police Woman, starring Angie Dickinson.

Her mother always supported her in her aspirations. However, after finishing her secondary education, Tamayo could not attend the Superior Police School since women were not yet admitted to the institution, so she opted for her second passion, technology, and entered the National Polytechnic School as a systems engineering major.

== Police career ==
Two years later, Tamayo left the program after the National Police began to admit women, receiving 700 applicants, of which 32 were selected. She was part of the first women's class in 1983. After graduating, she and her companions were assigned to research units with more administrative positions, in areas such as migration, where she spent four years. After this she moved to Urban Service in the Immediate Assistance Posts (PAI).

Tamayo has held positions in the National Traffic Directorate, National Education Directorate, and General Personnel Directorate, among others. She aspired to be part of the Intelligence and Rescue Group (GIR), but was unable to as it did not admit women. Throughout her police career she has received 20 decorations for effective work.

In 2014, she became the first officer to lead the Alberto Enríquez Gallo Higher Police School, where she was responsible for inclusion and gender equality in the training of officers.

In 2016 she was promoted from colonel to the rank of general and designated director of planning of the National Police.

On November 30, 2018, Tamayo became the first woman to be promoted to inspector general of the public force, in a ceremony where President Lenín Moreno and Interior Minister María Paula Romo recognized Tamayo's career and efforts.
