= Juan José García Ochoa =

Mexican politician (born 1969)

- Born: 4 June 1969 (age 56); Guanajuato, Guanajuato, Mexico
- Occupation: Politician
- Political party: PRD

Juan José García Ochoa (born 4 June 1969) is a Mexican politician affiliated with the Party of the Democratic Revolution. As of 2014 he served as Deputy of the LIX Legislature of the Mexican Congress as a plurinominal representative.
