= Mansour Al-Thagafi =

Saudi Arabian footballer

Personal information
- Full name: Mansour Atiah Al-Thagafi
- Date of birth: 14 January 1979 (age 47)
- Place of birth: Saudi Arabia
- Height: 1.91 m (6 ft 3 in)
- Position: Midfielder

Youth career
- Wej

Senior career*
Years	Team	Apps	(Gls)
2001–2010	Al-Nassr		
2007–2008	→ Al-Ahli (loan)		
2010–2011	Al-Qadsiah		

International career
2002–2005	Saudi Arabia	5	(0)
- * Club domestic league appearances and goals

Mansour Atiah Al-Thagafi (Arabic: منصور الثقفي) (born 14 January 1979) is a former Saudi Arabian footballer who played as a midfielder. Spending most of his club career for Al-Nassr, he represented Saudi Arabia at the 2002 FIFA World Cup.
