= Juan Rodríguez Pérez =

Peruvian writer of short novels (born 1952)

Juan Rodríguez Pérez (born Sauce, Peru 1952) is a Peruvian writer of short novels. He studied sociology at the National University of San Marcos, and has been published in the magazines El Ñandú Desplumado, El Narrador, and Casa de Asterión.

Pérez's work is notable for its themes about the Peruvian Amazon.

== Publications ==
- Sinfonía de ilusiones (1995)
- Nunca me han gustado los lunes (1998)
- Historia de amor desesperado (2009)
- La perla del Huallaga (2011)
- La sonrisa de Mariana (2012)
- La viejita que hacía temblar a la lluvia (2013)
- Sanguaza (2014)
- La tierra de los demonios (2016)
- Mujer de los viejos caminos (2016)
- Una casa junto al río (2018)
- La Perla del Huallaga (2da. edición, 2019)
- La Perla del Huallaga (3era. edición, 2023)
- Una casa junto al rio (2da. edición, 2024)
