= Juan José Tamayo =

Spanish theologian and professor of theology

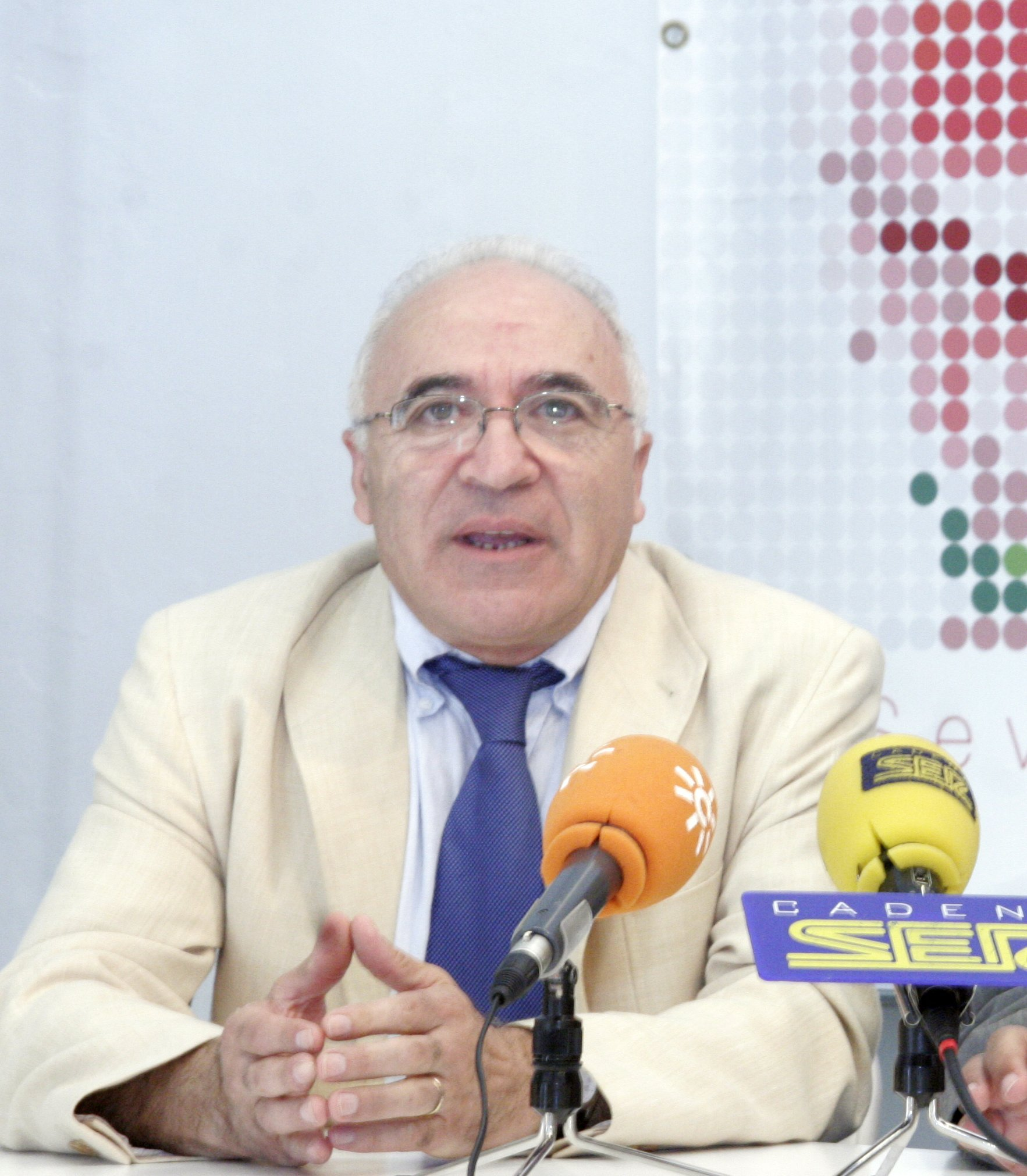
Tamayo in 2007

Juan José Tamayo (born October 7, 1946 in Amusco, Palencia) is a Spanish theologian and professor of theology at the Charles III University of Madrid. He specializes in Catholic hierarchy but has broadened into Islamic studies. He has contributed to controversies about Opus Dei, and has written over 50 books. He is president of the Asociación de Teólogos Juan XXIII.

On September 16, 2009, Tamayo won the Seventh President of the Republic of Tunisia International Prize for Islamic Studies for his book Islam: Culture, Religion and Politics (in Spanish), beating some 28 candidates from 13 different countries. Tunisian President Zine El Abidine Ben Ali presented the award during a ceremony held in Carthage Palace in Carthage. The book examines western prejudices against the Islamic world, questioning the common western stereotypes of Islam as a sexist, patriarchal, and fundamentally violent religion, and how it has become a successor to communism in critique following recent events of extremism and terrorism.

== Works ==
- 1976 – Por una Iglesia del pueblo. Mañana, Madrid
- 1989 – Para comprender la teología de la liberación. Estella, Verbo Divino
- 1993 – Conceptos fundamentales del cristianismo. Trotta, Madrid

- 1995 – Hacia la comunidad 1. La marginación, lugar social de los cristianos Trotta, Madrid
- 1994 – Hacia la comunidad 2. Iglesia profética, Iglesia de los pobres. Trotta, Madrid
- 1995 – Hacia la comunidad 3. Los sacramentos, liturgia del prójimo. Trotta, Madrid
- 1996 – Hacia la comunidad 4. Imágenes de Jesús. Condicionamientos sociales, culturales, religiosos y de género. Trotta, Madrid
- 1998 – Hacía la comunidad 5. Por eso lo mataron. El horizonte ético de Jesús de Nazaret. Trotta, Madrid
- 2000 – Hacia la comunidad 6. Dios y Jesús. El horizonte religiosos de Jesús de Nazaret. Trotta, Madrid

- 2000 – Diez palabras clave sobre Jesús de Nazaret. Estella, Verbo Divino
- 2003 – Nuevo paradigma teológico. Trotta, Madrid
- 2003 – Adiós a la cristiandad. Barcelona, Ediciones B. De esta obra hay una recensión de Laureano Xoaquín Araujo Cardalda publicada en Revista de Investigaciones Políticas y Sociológicas (RIPS), vol. 3, nº 2, 2004, pp. 152–154
- 2004 – Fundamentalismos y diálogo entre religiones. Editorial Trotta, 2004.
- 2005– Iglesia y sociedad en España Trotta, Madrid, 2005. In association with Jose María Castillo.
- 2005 – Nuevo diccionario de teología Trotta, Madrid
- 2008 – Tamayo Acosta, Juan José (dir.); Rodríguez Gómez, Edgardo (coord.) (2008), Aportación de la Teología de la Liberación a los Derechos Humanos, Dykinson, ISBN 978-84-9849-378-8
- 2009 – Tamayo Acosta; Juan José (2009), La Teología de la Liberación. En el nuevo escenario político y religioso, Tirant Lo Blanch, ISBN 978-84-9876-513-7
