= Juan José Rodríguez Prats =

Mexican lawyer and politician

- Born: 17 March 1946 (age 80); Pichucalco, Chiapas, Mexico
- Education: Universidad Veracruzana
- Occupations: Lawyer and politician
- Political party: PAN

Juan José Rodríguez Prats (born 17 March 1946) is a Mexican lawyer and politician affiliated with the National Action Party. As of 2014 he served as Senator of the LVIII and LIX Legislatures of the Mexican Congress representing Tabasco and as Deputy of the LV and LVII Legislatures.
