= Juan José Rodríguez (Costa Rican footballer) =

Costa Rican footballer (born 1967)

Personal information
- Full name: Juan José Rodríguez Morales
- Date of birth: 23 June 1967 (age 59)
- Place of birth: Tacares de Grecia, Costa Rica
- Height: 1.78 m (5 ft 10 in)
- Position: Left-back

Senior career*
Years	Team	Apps	(Gls)
1994–1997	Belén		
2001–2004	San Carlos		

International career
2002	Costa Rica	4	(0)
- * Club domestic league appearances and goals

Juan José Rodríguez Morales (born 23 June 1967) is a Costa Rican former professional footballer who played as a left-back.

== Club career ==
Nicknamed Peché, he played for a few teams, including Belén and San Carlos.

== International career ==
Rodríguez made his debut at almost 35 years of age for Costa Rica in an April 2002 friendly match against Japan and earned a total of four caps, scoring no goals. All games were 2002 World Cup warm-up games. He was a surprise inclusion in Costa Rica's 2002 FIFA World Cup squad, although he played no part in the tournament. He later denied allegations he was selected due to family relations with coach Alexandre Guimarães.

His final international was a May 2002 friendly against Belgium.

== Personal life ==
Rodríguez is married to Kattia Vargas and they have three children. He works at the Comité Cantonal de Deportes de San Carlos.
