= 2000 OFC Nations Cup squads =

The 2000 OFC Nations Cup was an international football tournament that was held in Papeete, Tahiti from 19 to 28 June 2000. The 6 national teams involved in the tournament were required to register a squad of players; only players in these squads were eligible to take part in the tournament. The 2000 Melanesia Cup and the 2000 Polynesia Cup were used to find the four qualifiers for the finals tournament (Fiji and Solomon Islands from Melanesia and Tahiti and Cook Islands from Polynesia respectively), to move on and join Australia and New Zealand at the main tournament. Vanuatu (as the Melanesian 3rd placer) replaced Fiji in the final tournament, due to civil unrest in Fiji following the 2000 Fijian coup d'état.

Players marked (c) were named as captain for their national squad. Players' club teams and players' age are as of 19 June 2000 – the tournament's opening day.

== Squad lists ==
=== Australia ===
Coach: Frank Farina

No.	Pos.	Player	Date of birth (age)	Caps	Club
1	GK	Zeljko Kalac	16 December 1972 (aged 27)		(Netherlands) Roda JC
2	DF	Kevin Muscat	7 August 1973 (aged 26)		(England) Wolverhampton Wanderers
3	DF	Shaun Murphy	5 November 1970 (aged 29)		(England) Sheffield United
4	DF	Paul Okon (c)	5 April 1972 (aged 28)		(Italy) Fiorentina
5	DF	Tony Popovic	4 July 1973 (aged 26)		(Japan) Sanfrecce Hiroshima
6	MF	Craig Foster	15 April 1969 (aged 31)		(England) Crystal Palace
7	DF	Danny Tiatto	22 May 1973 (aged 27)		(England) Manchester City
8	MF	Stan Lazaridis	16 August 1972 (aged 27)		(England) Birmingham City
9	FW	David Zdrilic	13 April 1974 (aged 26)		(Germany) SSV Ulm 1846
11	FW	Paul Agostino	9 June 1975 (aged 25)		(Germany) 1860 Munich
12	DF	Stephen Laybutt	3 September 1977 (aged 22)		(Australia) Parramatta Power
13	MF	Brett Emerton	22 February 1979 (aged 21)		(Australia) Sydney Olympic
14	FW	Aurelio Vidmar	3 February 1967 (aged 33)		(Australia) Adelaide City
16	DF	Simon Colosimo	8 January 1979 (aged 21)		(Australia) Carlton SC
17	FW	Clayton Zane	12 July 1977 (aged 22)		(Australia) Northern Spirit
18	GK	Clint Bolton	22 August 1975 (aged 24)		(Australia) Brisbane Strikers
21	FW	Pablo Cardozo	23 December 1972 (aged 27)		(Australia) Sydney Olympic
23	MF	Steve Corica	24 March 1973 (aged 27)		(England) Wolverhampton Wanderers
24	DF	Steve Horvat	14 March 1971 (aged 29)		(Australia) Carlton SC
25	MF	Scott Chipperfield	30 December 1975 (aged 24)		(Australia) Wollongong Wolves

=== Cook Islands ===
Coach: (England) Alan Taylor

No.	Pos.	Player	Date of birth (age)	Caps	Club
1	GK	Tony Jamieson	16 March 1974 (aged 26)		(New Zealand) North Wellington AFC
2	DF	Tristram Chambers	7 January 1971 (aged 29)		(Cook Islands) Tupapa Maraerenga
3	DF	Mark Jamieson	20 July 1972 (aged 27)		(New Zealand) North Wellington AFC
4	DF	John Pareanga	2 October 1980 (aged 19)		(Cook Islands) Matavera
5	DF	Ngatuaine Mani	5 March 1982 (aged 18)		(Cook Islands) Avatiu
6	DF	Heath Dickenson	2 February 1968 (aged 32)		(New Zealand) University-Mount Wellington
7	MF	Raymond Newnham	27 April 1968 (aged 32)		(Cook Islands) Matavera
8	MF	Christian Tauira	6 July 1981 (aged 18)		(Cook Islands) Avatiu
9	FW	Joseph Chambers	15 April 1976 (aged 24)		(Cook Islands) Tupapa Maraerenga
10	MF	Junior Puroku	26 January 1981 (aged 19)		(Cook Islands) Tupapa Maraerenga
11	MF	Daniel Shepherd	23 September 1974 (aged 25)		(New Zealand) Waitakere City
12	DF	Dean Tereu	9 July 1972 (aged 27)		(Cook Islands) Titikaveka
13	MF	Edward Drollett	7 June 1975 (aged 25)		(Cook Islands) Tupapa Maraerenga
14	DF	James Nand	6 April 1977 (aged 23)		(Cook Islands) Tupapa Maraerenga
15	MF	Justin Shepherd	8 June 1981 (aged 19)		(Cook Islands) Nikao Sokattak
16	FW	Nikorima Te Miha	1 January 1980 (aged 20)		(Cook Islands) Puaikura
17	DF	Barnabas Enjoy	10 May 1980 (aged 20)		(Cook Islands) Takuvaine
18	FW	Stenter Mani	14 September 1978 (aged 21)		(Australia) Seaford United
19	MF	Hinoi Henry	16 June 1981 (aged 19)		(Cook Islands) Puaikura
20	GK	Jonathan Kairua	19 June 1977 (aged 23)		(Cook Islands) Nikao Sokattak
21	MF	Teremaki Paniani	20 February 1975 (aged 25)		(Cook Islands) Nikao Sokattak

=== New Zealand ===
Coach: (England) Ken Dugdale

No.	Pos.	Player	Date of birth (age)	Caps	Club
1	GK	Jason Batty	23 March 1971 (aged 29)		(Australia) Football Kingz
2	DF	Che Bunce	29 August 1975 (aged 24)		(Australia) Football Kingz
3	DF	Sean Douglas	8 May 1972 (aged 28)		(Australia) Carlton SC
4	DF	Chris Zoricich (c)	3 May 1969 (aged 31)		(Australia) Sydney Olympic
5	DF	Jonathan Perry	22 November 1976 (aged 23)		(Australia) Football Kingz
6	DF	Gavin Wilkinson	5 November 1973 (aged 26)		(Singapore) Geylang United
7	MF	Simon Elliott	10 June 1974 (aged 26)		(United States) LA Galaxy
8	FW	Chris Killen	8 October 1981 (aged 18)		(England) Manchester City
9	FW	Paul Urlovic	21 November 1978 (aged 21)		(Australia) Melbourne Knights
10	MF	Chris Jackson	18 July 1970 (aged 29)		(Australia) Football Kingz
11	MF	Harry Ngata	24 August 1971 (aged 28)		(Australia) Football Kingz
12	MF	Mark Atkinson	16 February 1970 (aged 30)		(Australia) Carlton SC
13	DF	Kris Bouckenooghe	7 February 1977 (aged 23)		(Belgium) Roeselare
14	MF	Jeff Campbell	25 August 1979 (aged 20)		(Australia) Football Kingz
15	MF	Ivan Vicelich	3 September 1976 (aged 23)		(Australia) Football Kingz
16	MF	Raf de Gregorio	20 May 1977 (aged 23)		(Netherlands) FC Dordrecht
17	MF	Josh Stick	12 February 1980 (aged 20)		(New Zealand) Central United
18	DF	Scott Smith	6 March 1975 (aged 25)		(England) Woking FC
19	GK	Ross Nicholson	8 August 1975 (aged 24)		(New Zealand) Central United
20	DF	Gerard Davis	25 September 1977 (aged 22)		(Australia) Football Kingz

=== Solomon Islands ===
Coach: (Scotland) George Cowie

No.	Pos.	Player	Date of birth (age)	Caps	Club
1	GK	Severino Aefi	15 October 1970 (aged 29)		(Solomon Islands) Las United
2	DF	Eddie Edwin	20 March 1979 (aged 21)		(Solomon Islands) Mars FC
3	DF	Selson Molea	20 January 1975 (aged 25)		(Solomon Islands) Naha FC
4	FW	Jimmy Kaierea	23 November 1974 (aged 25)		(Solomon Islands)
5	MF	Vivian Wickham	12 June 1982 (aged 18)		(Australia) Toowoomba Raiders
6	DF	Saeni Daudau	4 September 1978 (aged 21)		(Solomon Islands) Koloale FC
7	MF	Jack Samani	7 May 1979 (aged 21)		(Solomon Islands) Marist Fire
8	MF	Francis Wasi	11 December 1976 (aged 23)		(New Zealand) Nelson Suburbs
9	FW	Commins Menapi	18 September 1977 (aged 22)		(New Zealand) Nelson Suburbs
10	MF	Stanley Waita	10 October 1979 (aged 20)		(Solomon Islands) Malaita Eagles
11	FW	Batram Suri	2 November 1971 (aged 28)		(Australia) Football Kingz
13	DF	David Firisua	12 July 1981 (aged 18)		(New Zealand) Mangere United
14	MF	Moses Toata	10 October 1975 (aged 24)		(Solomon Islands) Kossa FC
15	MF	Patterson Daudau	2 February 1978 (aged 22)		(New Zealand) Nelson Suburbs
16	DF	Jerry Allen	21 March 1979 (aged 21)		(Solomon Islands) Marist Fire
17	MF	Gideon Omokirio	12 October 1976 (aged 23)		(Solomon Islands) Laugu United
18	MF	Henry Koto	13 August 1976 (aged 23)		(Solomon Islands) Laugu United
19	FW	Joel Konofilia	7 January 1977 (aged 23)		(Papua New Guinea) Unitech FC
20	GK	Fred Hale	17 July 1979 (aged 20)		(Solomon Islands) Koloale FC

=== Tahiti ===
Coach: (Australia) Leon Gardikiotis

No.	Pos.	Player	Date of birth (age)	Caps	Club
1	GK	Jimmy Tahutini	8 December 1976 (aged 23)		(French Polynesia) AS Vénus
2	DF	Steve Fatupua-Lecaill	12 January 1976 (aged 24)		(French Polynesia) AS Vénus
3	DF	Patrick Atger	10 October 1969 (aged 30)		(French Polynesia) AS Manu-Ura
4	DF	Heimana Paama	1 September 1975 (aged 24)		(French Polynesia) AS Pirae
5	MF	Sylvain Booene	31 January 1968 (aged 32)		(French Polynesia) AS Vénus
6	MF	Aldo Tauihara	10 November 1973 (aged 26)		(French Polynesia) AS Manu-Ura
7	DF	Samuel Garcia	2 October 1975 (aged 24)		(French Polynesia) AS Vénus
8	MF	Teva Zaveroni	10 October 1975 (aged 24)		(French Polynesia) AS Pirae
9	FW	Félix Tagawa	23 March 1976 (aged 24)		(French Polynesia) AS Vénus
10	FW	Harold Amaru	23 April 1970 (aged 30)		(French Polynesia) AS Pirae
11	FW	Naea Bennett	8 July 1977 (aged 22)		(French Polynesia) AS Vénus
12	DF	Vehia Maurirere	10 November 1972 (aged 27)		(French Polynesia) AS Tefana
13	MF	Tetahio Auraa	9 July 1973 (aged 26)		(French Polynesia) AS Manu-Ura
14	MF	Calixte Tetuanui	7 February 1973 (aged 27)		(French Polynesia) AS Vénus
15	MF	Jean Victor Tinorua	20 January 1982 (aged 18)		(French Polynesia) AS Vénus
16	DF	Angelo Tchen	8 March 1982 (aged 18)		(French Polynesia) AS Tefana
17	FW	Tony Sénéchal	4 March 1977 (aged 23)		(French Polynesia) AS Vénus
18	FW	David Niuhiti			(French Polynesia) AS Vénus
19	GK	Stanley Tien Wah	6 September 1977 (aged 22)		(French Polynesia) AS Dragon
20	GK	Daniel Tapeta	25 October 1974 (aged 25)		(French Polynesia) AS Manu-Ura
21	FW	Thierry Qaeze			(French Polynesia) AS Vaiete
22	MF	Jean-Loup Rousseau	27 March 1970 (aged 30)		(France) FC Metz
23	MF	Bruno Beramelli			(French Polynesia) AS Manu-Ura

=== Vanuatu ===
Coach: (Uruguay) Juan Carlos Buzzetti

No.	Pos.	Player	Date of birth (age)	Caps	Club
1	GK	David Chilia	10 June 1978 (aged 22)		(Vanuatu) Tupuji Imere
2	DF	Jimmy Ben	17 August 1976 (aged 23)		(Vanuatu) Shepherds United
3	DF	Graham Demas	25 October 1980 (aged 19)		(Vanuatu) Tafea FC
4	DF	Simon Lauru	30 January 1972 (aged 28)		(Vanuatu) Shepherds United
5	DF	Lexa Bibi	16 April 1978 (aged 22)		(Vanuatu) Tupuji Imere
6	DF	Eddy Mansale	18 May 1973 (aged 27)		(Vanuatu) Tafea FC
7	FW	Richard Iwai	15 March 1979 (aged 21)		(Vanuatu) Tafea FC
8	MF	Edwin Rarai	27 March 1969 (aged 31)		(Vanuatu) Tafea FC
9	FW	Moise Poida	2 April 1978 (aged 22)		(Vanuatu) Tafea FC
10	MF	Nono Noel	7 December 1973 (aged 26)		(Vanuatu) Tafea FC
11	MF	Fedy Vava	25 November 1982 (aged 17)		(Vanuatu) Tafea FC
12	FW	George Natuoivi	17 September 1978 (aged 21)		(Vanuatu) Ifira Black Bird
13	DF	Gérard Maki Haitong	6 July 1978 (aged 21)		(Vanuatu) Tafea FC
14	FW	Etienne Mermer	26 January 1977 (aged 23)		(Vanuatu) Nipikinamu FC
15	DF	Nicholas Bruno	26 March 1973 (aged 27)		(Vanuatu) Tafea FC
16	MF	Pita David Maki	12 October 1982 (aged 17)		(Vanuatu) Yatel FC
17	DF	Hubert Reuben	11 November 1974 (aged 25)		(Vanuatu) Rainbow FC
18	FW	Roger Waiwai	21 April 1983 (aged 17)		(Vanuatu) Tafea FC
19	MF	Pita Kalotong	6 June 1975 (aged 25)		(Vanuatu) Tupuji Imere
20	GK	John Garae	5 April 1983 (aged 17)		(Vanuatu) Tafea FC

== Player representation ==
=== By club nationality ===
Players	Clubs
22	Australia, (French Polynesia) Tahiti
20	Vanuatu
16	Cook Islands
13	Solomon Islands
9	England
8	New Zealand
2	Germany, Netherlands
1	Belgium, France, Greece, (Republic of Ireland) Ireland, Italy, Japan, Norway, Papua New Guinea, United States

Nations in italics are not represented by their national teams in the finals.

=== By representatives of domestic league ===
National Squad	No.
Australia	7
Cook Islands	16
New Zealand	2
Solomon Islands	13
Tahiti	22
Vanuatu	20
