= Cook Islands national football team results =

The Cook Islands national football team represents the Cook Islands in association football and is controlled by the Cook Islands Football Association (CIFA), the governing body of the sport in the country. Before joining Fédération Internationale de Football Association (FIFA) and the Oceania Football Confederation (OFC), it played its first match at the 1971 South Pacific Games – a 16–1 loss to Papua New Guinea.

From a total of 59 matches, the Cook Islands has won 14, drawn four and lost 41, scoring 54 goals and conceding 275. The majority of its matches have been played at neutral venues.

In 1994, CIFA joined both FIFA and the OFC and the national team began competing in the qualifying stages of the FIFA World Cup and the OFC Men's Nations Cup. Its early matches included a string of double figure defeats at the South Pacific Games including a 30–0 defeat against Tahiti.

During their first qualifying campaign for the 1998 FIFA World Cup in November 1996, the Cook Islands narrowly lost to Tonga and Western Samoa. As a result of success at the 1998 Polynesia Cup and the 2000 Polynesia Cup, in which the Cook Islands twice finished as runners-up, the team qualified for both the 1998 OFC Nations Cup and the 2000 OFC Nations Cup. The Cook Islands lost all their matches at both tournaments, including two heavy defeats against Australia.

Taylor Saghabi became the Cook Islands' top goalscorer after scoring a hat-trick against Tonga during qualification for the 2018 FIFA World Cup in August 2015. Saghabi has scored a total of seven goals in 19 caps between 2011 and 2024.

== Key ==
Key to matches

- Att. = Match attendance
- (H) = Home ground
- (A) = Away ground
- (N) = Neutral ground

Key to record by opponent

- Pld = Games played
- W = Games won
- D = Games drawn
- L = Games lost
- GF = Goals for
- GA = Goals against

== Results ==
The Cook Islands' score is shown first in each case.

No.	Date	Venue	Opponents	Score	Competition	Cook Islands scorers	Att.	Ref.
1	11 September 1971	Papeete (N)	Papua New Guinea	1–16	1971 South Pacific Games	Unknown	—	
2	13 September 1971	Papeete (N)	Tahiti	0–30	1971 South Pacific Games		—	
3	15 September 1971	Papeete (N)	Fiji	1–15	1971 South Pacific Games	Unknown	—	
4	16 August 1995	French Polynesia (N)	New Caledonia	0–9	1995 South Pacific Games		—	
5	19 August 1995	French Polynesia (N)	Wallis and Futuna	2–1	1995 South Pacific Games	Unknown	—	
6	21 August 1995	French Polynesia (N)	Solomon Islands	0–16	1995 South Pacific Games		—	
7	22 August 1995	French Polynesia (N)	Tahiti	0–11	1995 South Pacific Games		—	
8	11 November 1996	Nukuʻalofa (N)	Tonga	0–2	1998 FIFA World Cup qualification		—	
9	13 November 1996	Nukuʻalofa (N)	Western Samoa	1–2	1998 FIFA World Cup qualification	Stenter	—	
10	2 September 1998	Rarotonga (N)	Samoa	2–1	1998 Polynesia Cup	Unknown	—	
11	3 September 1998	Rarotonga (N)	American Samoa	4–3	1998 Polynesia Cup	Unknown	—	
12	5 September 1998	Rarotonga (N)	Tonga	2–2	1998 Polynesia Cup	Unknown	—	
13	8 September 1998	Rarotonga (N)	Tahiti	0–5	1998 Polynesia Cup		—	
14	28 September 1998	Lang Park, Brisbane (N)	Australia	0–16	1998 OFC Nations Cup		600	
15	30 September 1998	Lang Park, Brisbane (N)	Fiji	0–3	1998 OFC Nations Cup		500	
16	8 June 2000	Paranuu Stadium, Papeete (N)	Tonga	2–1	2000 Polynesia Cup	G.Mani, Te Miha	—	
17	10 June 2000	Paranuu Stadium, Papeete (N)	American Samoa	3–0	2000 Polynesia Cup	N.Mani, Jamieson, Drollett	—	
18	12 June 2000	Paranuu Stadium, Papeete (N)	Tahiti	0–2	2000 Polynesia Cup		—	
19	14 June 2000	Paranuu Stadium, Papeete (N)	Samoa	3–2	2000 Polynesia Cup	Unknown	—	
20	19 June 2000	Stade Pater, Pirae (N)	Australia	0–17	2000 OFC Nations Cup		1,000	
21	21 June 2000	Stade Pater, Pirae (N)	Solomon Islands	1–5	2000 OFC Nations Cup	Shepherd	1,000	
22	4 June 2001	North Harbour Stadium, Auckland (N)	Solomon Islands	1–9	2002 FIFA World Cup qualification	Te Miha	1,542	
23	6 June 2001	North Harbour Stadium, Auckland (N)	Vanuatu	1–8	2002 FIFA World Cup qualification	Pukoku	600	
24	8 June 2001	North Harbour Stadium, Auckland (N)	New Zealand	0–2	2002 FIFA World Cup qualification		500	
25	11 June 2001	North Harbour Stadium, Auckland (N)	Tahiti	0–6	2002 FIFA World Cup qualification		300	
26	5 May 2004	New Zealand (N)	Samoa	0–0	Friendly		—	
27	10 May 2004	Lawson Tama Stadium, Honiara (N)	Tahiti	0–2	2006 FIFA World Cup qualification		12,000	
28	12 May 2004	Lawson Tama Stadium, Honiara (N)	Solomon Islands	0–5	2006 FIFA World Cup qualification		14,000	
29	15 May 2004	Lawson Tama Stadium, Honiara (N)	Tonga	1–2	2006 FIFA World Cup qualification	Pareanga	15,000	
30	17 May 2004	Lawson Tama Stadium, Honiara (N)	New Caledonia	0–8	2006 FIFA World Cup qualification		400	
31	27 August 2007	Toleofoa Joseph Blatter Soccer Complex, Apia (N)	Fiji	0–4	2007 South Pacific Games		400	
32	29 August 2007	Toleofoa Joseph Blatter Soccer Complex, Apia (N)	New Caledonia	0–3	2007 South Pacific Games		200	
33	1 September 2007	Toleofoa Joseph Blatter Soccer Complex, Apia (N)	Tuvalu	4–1	2007 South Pacific Games	Mateariki (2), Le Mouton, Tom	200	
34	3 September 2007	Toleofoa Joseph Blatter Soccer Complex, Apia (N)	Tahiti	0–1	2007 South Pacific Games		100	
35	11 June 2009	Loto-Tonga Soka Centre, Nukuʻalofa (A)	Tonga	1–1	Friendly	Ngauora	—	
36	13 June 2009	Loto-Tonga Soka Centre, Nukuʻalofa (A)	Tonga	2–1	Friendly	Best, Ngauora	—	
37	27 August 2011	Stade Boewa, Boulari Bay (N)	Papua New Guinea	0–4	2011 Pacific Games		—	
38	30 August 2011	Stade Boewa, Boulari Bay (N)	Tahiti	0–7	2011 Pacific Games		—	
39	1 September 2011	Stade Boewa, Boulari Bay (N)	Kiribati	3–0	2011 Pacific Games	Saghabi (2), Pareanga	—	
40	3 September 2011	Stade Boewa, Boulari Bay (N)	Fiji	1–4	2011 Pacific Games	Ngauora	—	
41	22 November 2011	National Soccer Stadium, Apia (N)	Samoa	2–3	2014 FIFA World Cup qualification	Best (2)	600	
42	24 November 2011	National Soccer Stadium, Apia (N)	American Samoa	1–1	2014 FIFA World Cup qualification	Luvu (o.g.)	300	
43	26 November 2011	National Soccer Stadium, Apia (N)	Tonga	1–2	2014 FIFA World Cup qualification	Harmon	200	
44	31 August 2015	Loto-Tonga Soka Centre (Field 1), Nukuʻalofa (N)	Tonga	3–0	2018 FIFA World Cup qualification	Saghabi (3)	300	
45	2 September 2015	Loto-Tonga Soka Centre (Field 1), Nukuʻalofa (N)	Samoa	1–0	2018 FIFA World Cup qualification	Saghabi	150	
46	4 September 2015	Loto-Tonga Soka Centre (Field 1), Nukuʻalofa (N)	American Samoa	0–2	2018 FIFA World Cup qualification		250	
—	13 March 2022	Al-Arabi Stadium, Doha (N)	Tonga	w/o	2022 FIFA World Cup qualification		—	
47	17 March 2022	Al-Arabi Stadium, Doha (N)	Solomon Islands	0–2	2022 FIFA World Cup qualification		—	
—	20 March 2022	Al-Arabi Stadium, Doha (N)	Tahiti	–	2022 FIFA World Cup qualification		—	
—	24 March 2022	Qatar SC Stadium, Doha (N)	Vanuatu	–	2022 FIFA World Cup qualification		—	
48	28 August 2023	Stade Pater Te Hono Nui, Pirae (A)	Tahiti	1–9	Friendly	Enoka	—	
49	31 August 2023	Stade Pater Te Hono Nui, Pirae (A)	Tahiti	0–3	Friendly		—	
50	21 November 2023	SIFF Academy Field, Honiara (N)	Tonga	2–1	2023 Pacific Games	Tiputoa, Rimene-Albrett	—	
51	24 November 2023	SIFF Academy Field, Honiara (N)	New Caledonia	0–8	2023 Pacific Games		—	
52	27 November 2023	SIFF Academy Field, Honiara (N)	Papua New Guinea	0–3	2023 Pacific Games		—	
53	30 November 2023	SIFF Academy Field, Honiara (N)	Samoa	0–3	2023 Pacific Games		—	
54	23 March 2024	Teufaiva Stadium, Nuku'alofa (N)	Samoa	0–1	2024 OFC Nations Cup qualification		300	
55	26 March 2024	Teufaiva Stadium, Nuku'alofa (N)	Tonga	1–0	2024 OFC Nations Cup qualification	Saghabi	500	
56	6 September 2024	National Soccer Stadium, Apia (N)	Tonga	1–3	2026 FIFA World Cup qualification	T. Kumsuz	300	
57	9 September 2024	National Soccer Stadium, Apia (N)	American Samoa	1–2	Friendly	Kaufononga	—	
58	26 September 2026	CIFA Academy Field, Matavera (H)	Tahiti	1–3	Friendly	K. Kumsuz	—	
59	30 September 2026	CIFA Academy Field, Matavera (H)	Tahiti	3–2	Friendly	Mata (2), Rimene-Albrett	—	

Notes

1. A: The 1998 Polynesia Cup doubled as qualifiers for the 1998 OFC Nations Cup.
2. B: The 2000 Polynesia Cup doubled as qualifiers for the 2000 OFC Nations Cup.
3. C: The Oceanian qualifiers for the 2006 FIFA World Cup doubled as qualifiers for the 2004 OFC Nations Cup.
4. D: The men's football tournament at the 2007 South Pacific Games doubled as qualifiers for the 2008 OFC Nations Cup and the first round of qualifiers for the 2010 FIFA World Cup.
5. E: The Oceanian qualifiers for the 2014 FIFA World Cup doubled as qualifiers for the 2012 OFC Nations Cup.
6. F: The Oceanian qualifiers for the 2018 FIFA World Cup doubled as qualifiers for the 2016 OFC Nations Cup.
7. G: Tonga withdrew from qualifying for the 2022 FIFA World Cup due to the 2022 Hunga Tonga–Hunga Ha'apai eruption and tsunami.
8. H: This match was played as a qualifier for the 2022 FIFA World Cup, but redesignated as a friendly after the Cook Islands withdrew from the competition due to a COVID-19 outbreak in their squad.
9. I: The Cook Islands match against Tahiti during qualifying for the 2022 FIFA World Cup was cancelled due to an outbreak of COVID-19 among the Cook Islands' squad.
10. J: The Cook Islands match against Vanuatu during qualifying for the 2022 FIFA World Cup was cancelled due to an outbreak of COVID-19 among the Vanuatu squad.
11. K: Cook Islands forfeited.

== Record by opponent ==
Team	Pld	W	D	L	GF	GA	GD	WPCT
American Samoa	5	2	1	2	9	8	+1	40.00
Australia	2	0	0	2	0	33	−33	0.00
Fiji	4	0	0	4	2	26	−24	0.00
Kiribati	1	1	0	0	3	0	+3	100.00
New Caledonia	4	0	0	4	0	28	−28	0.00
New Zealand	1	0	0	1	0	2	−2	0.00
Papua New Guinea	3	0	0	3	1	23	−22	0.00
Samoa (Note: Includes results as Western Samoa.)	8	3	1	4	9	12	−3	37.50
Solomon Islands	5	0	0	5	2	37	−35	0.00
Tahiti	12	1	0	11	5	81	−76	8.33
Tonga	11	5	2	4	16	15	+1	45.45
Tuvalu	1	1	0	0	4	1	+3	100.00
Vanuatu	1	0	0	1	1	8	−7	0.00
Wallis and Futuna	1	1	0	0	2	1	+1	100.00
Total	59	14	4	41	54	275	−221	23.73

Source: Results
