= 2000 Australia national soccer team season =

Australia
2000 season

This page summarises the Australia national soccer team fixtures and results in 2000.

== Record ==
| Type | GP | W | D | L | GF | GA |
|---|---|---|---|---|---|---|
| Friendly matches | 11 | 4 | 4 | 3 | 13 | 11 |
| OFC Nations Cup | 4 | 4 | 0 | 0 | 26 | 0 |
| Total | 15 | 8 | 4 | 3 | 39 | 11 |

== Match results ==
=== Friendlies ===
| 9 February 2000 International Friendly | Chile | 2–1 | Australia | Valparaíso, Chile |
| | Gonzalez 10'; Navia 92' (pen.) | | 15' (pen.) Corica | Stadium: Estadio Playa Ancha; Attendance: 9,000; Referee: (Chile) Eduardo Gamboa |

| 12 February 2000 International Friendly | Australia | 0–0 | Slovakia | Valparaíso, Chile |
| | | | | Stadium: Estadio Playa Ancha; Attendance: 9,000; Referee: (Chile) Luis Mariano Pena |

| 15 February 2000 International Friendly | Australia | 1–1 | Bulgaria | Valparaíso, Chile |
| | Agostino 1' | | 89' Ivanov | Stadium: Estadio Playa Ancha; Attendance: 9,000; Referee: (Chile) Rubén Selman |

| 23 February 2000 International Friendly | Hungary | 0–3 | Australia | Budapest, Hungary |
| | | | 12' Laybutt; 72' Skoko; 89' Moore | Attendance: 14,000; Referee: (Austria) Dietmar Drabek |

| 29 March 2000 International Friendly | Czech Republic | 3–1 | Australia | Teplice, Czech Republic |
| | Fukal 10'; Koller 53'; Ulich 66' | | 88' Foster | Stadium: Na Stinadlech Stadium; Attendance: 9,820; Referee: (Slovenia) Hrinak |

| 9 June 2000 International Friendly | Australia | 0–0 | Paraguay | Sydney, Australia |
| | | | | Stadium: Sydney Football Stadium; Attendance: 10,000; Referee: (Australia) Simon Micallef |

| 12 June 2000 International Friendly | Australia | 0–0 | Paraguay | Brisbane, Australia |
| | | | | Stadium: Brisbane Cricket Ground; Attendance: 10,000; Referee: (Australia) Mark Shield |

| 15 June 2000 International Friendly | Australia | 2–1 | Paraguay | Melbourne, Australia |
| | Foster 47'; Zdrillic 52' | | 58' Caceres | Stadium: Olympic Park Stadium; Attendance: 7,500; Referee: (Australia) Gerry Connolly |

| 4 October 2000 International Friendly | Kuwait | 0–1 | Australia | Dubai, United Arab Emirates |
| | | | Aloisi 49' |

| 7 October 2000 International Friendly | South Korea | 4–2 | Australia | Dubai, United Arab Emirates |
| | Jae Won 44'; Jung Yoon 48'; Ki Hyeon 65'; Dong Gook 90+2' (pen.) | | 30', 35' Agostino |

| 15 November 2000 International Friendly | Scotland | 0–2 | Australia | Glasgow, United Kingdom |
| | | | 12' Emerton; 66' Zdrillic | Stadium: Hampden Park; Attendance: 30,985; Referee: (France) Pascal Garibian |

=== Oceania Nations Cup ===
| 19 June 2000 Group stage | Australia | 17–0 | Cook Islands | Papeete, Tahiti |
| | Agostino 18', 53', 68'; Muscat 21', 45' (pen); Tiatto 24'; Foster 30', 42', 51', 80'; Zdrilic 35', 65'; Popovic 60'; Corica 70'; Zane 82', 87', 89' | report | | Stadium: Stade Pater; Attendance: 1,000; Referee: (French Polynesia) Ronan Leaustic |

| 23 June 2000 Group stage | Australia | 6–0 | Solomon Islands | Papeete, Tahiti |
| | Chipperfield 6'; Zane 13', 35'; Omokirio 36' (OG); Muscat 39' (pen); Cardozo 43' | | | Stadium: Stade Pater; Attendance: 1,000; Referee: (Papua New Guinea) Sosongan |

| 25 June 2000 Semi-final | Australia | 1–0 | Vanuatu | Papeete, Tahiti |
| | Muscat 5' (pen.) | | | Stadium: Stade Pater; Attendance: 300; Referee: (New Zealand) Brian Precious |

| 28 June 2000 Final | Australia | 2–0 | New Zealand | Papeete, Tahiti |
| | Murphy 40'; Foster 66' | | | Stadium: Stade Pater; Attendance: 2,000; Referee: (French Polynesia) Harry Attison |

== Goal scorers ==
| Player | Goals |
|---|---|
| Foster | 7 |
| Agostino | 6 |
| Zane | 5 |
| Muscat | 4 |
| Zdrilic | 4 |
| Corica | 2 |
| Aloisi | 1 |
| Cardozo | 1 |
| Chipperfield | 1 |
| Emerton | 1 |
| Laybutt | 1 |
| Moore | 1 |
| Murphy | 1 |
| Popovic | 1 |
| Skoko | 1 |
| Tiatto | 1 |
