= List of Tonga international footballers =

The Tonga national football team represents the country of Tonga in international association football. It is fielded by Tonga Football Association, the governing body of football in Tonga, and competes as a member of the Oceania Football Confederation (OFC), which encompasses the countries of Oceania. Tonga played their first international match on 29 August 1979 in an 8–0 loss to Tahiti in Suva.

Tonga have competed in numerous competitions, and all players who have played in at least one international match, either as a member of the starting eleven or as a substitute, are listed below. Each player's details include his playing position while with the team, the number of caps earned and goals scored in all international matches, and details of the first and most recent matches played in. The names are initially ordered by number of caps (in descending order), then by date of debut, then by alphabetical order. All statistics are correct up to and including the match played on 18 July 2019.

== Key ==
Positions key
GK	Goalkeeper
DF	Defender
MF	Midfielder
FW	Forward

Position
Playing positions are listed according to the tactical formations that were employed at the time.
Caps and goals
Caps and goals comprise those in the FIFA World Cup and OFC Nations Cup, Polynesia Cup, their associated qualification matches, as well as Pacific Games, Pacific Mini Games matches and international friendly matches.

== Players ==
Tonga national team football players
Player	Pos.	Caps	Goals	Debut		Last or most recent match		Ref.
Player	Pos.	Caps	Goals	Date	Opponent	Date	Opponent	Ref.
Kilifi Uele	MF	26	3	11 November 1996	Cook Islands	14 December 2017	Vanuatu	
Unaloto Feao	MF	17	7	7 April 2001	Samoa	12 December 2017	Fiji	
Lafaele Moala	FW	16	1	1 July 2003	Papua New Guinea	4 September 2015	Samoa	
Folio Moeaki	DF	15	1	10 May 2004	Solomon Islands	4 September 2015	Samoa	
Siu'a Ma'amaloa	MF	14	1	7 April 2001	Samoa	19 May 2004	New Caledonia	
Sione Uhatahi	DF	14	1	27 August 2007	Solomon Islands	18 July 2019	Papua New Guinea	
Mark Uhatahi	MF	11	3	1 July 2003	Papua New Guinea	2 September 2015	American Samoa	
Kamaliele Papani	MF	11	0	3 July 2003	New Caledonia	15 July 2019	Vanuatu	
Hemaloto Polovili	FW	11	0	19 August 2015	Fiji	18 July 2019	Papua New Guinea	
Viliami Taufahema	GK	10	0	11 November 1996	Cook Islands	7 July 2003	Tahiti	
Kava Huihahau	DF	10	0	1 July 2003	Papua New Guinea	29 August 2007	Samoa	
Ilalio Leakona	DF	9	0	27 August 2007	Solomon Islands	12 December 2017	Fiji	
Fineasi Palei	MF	9	0	22 November 2011	American Samoa	18 July 2019	Papua New Guinea	
Lotima Taufoou	DF	9	0	19 August 2015	Fiji	14 December 2017	Tuvalu	
Timote Moleni	MF	8	2	11 November 1996	Cook Islands	16 April 2001	Fiji	
Solomone Moa	MF	8	0	7 April 2001	Samoa	19 May 2004	New Caledonia	
Filisione Taufahema	DF	8	2	7 April 2001	Samoa	16 March 2002	New Caledonia	
Ipeni Fonua	MF	8	1	14 April 2001	American Samoa	15 May 2004	Cook Islands	
Heneli Saafi	GK	8	0	10 May 2004	Solomon Islands	4 September 2015	Samoa	
Soakai Vea	FW	8	0	19 August 2015	Fiji	14 December 2017	Tuvalu	
Siuloa Fahina	DF	8	0	2 December 2017	Solomon Islands	18 July 2019	Papua New Guinea	
Vai Lutu	MF	8	0	2 December 2017	Solomon Islands	18 July 2019	Papua New Guinea	
Laulea Taufa	MF	8	0	2 December 2017	Solomon Islands	18 July 2019	Papua New Guinea	
Teu Fakava	FW	7	1	7 April 2001	Samoa	7 July 2003	Tahiti	
Lokoua Taufahema	MF	7	5	7 April 2001	Samoa	26 November 2011	Cook Islands	
Sitenilesili Mafi	DF	7	0	1 July 2003	Papua New Guinea	19 May 2004	New Caledonia	
Pio Palu	MF	7	0	27 August 2007	Solomon Islands	26 November 2011	Cook Islands	
Malakai Savieti	FW	7	1	27 August 2007	Solomon Islands	26 November 2011	Cook Islands	
Samisoni Mafi	DF	7	0	22 November 2011	American Samoa	4 September 2015	Samoa	
Mahe Malafu	GK	7	0	2 December 2017	Solomon Islands	18 July 2019	Papua New Guinea	
Penieli Moa	FW	6	1	15 November 1996	Samoa	12 March 2002	American Samoa	
Halapu'a Falepapalangi	DF	6	0	7 April 2001	Samoa	16 March 2002	New Caledonia	
Makatu'u Moeaki	DF	6	0	1 July 2003	Papua New Guinea	19 May 2004	New Caledonia	
Sione Tovo	MF	6	0	29 August 2007	Samoa	24 November 2011	Samoa	
Sione Teu	DF	6	0	22 November 2011	American Samoa	2 September 2015	New Caledonia	
Salesi Lanisi	DF	5	0	11 November 1996	Cook Islands	9 March 2002	Samoa	
Kaisani Uhatahi	FW	5	1	9 April 2001	Australia	3 September 2007	Vanuatu	
Maamalua Tevi	MF	5	1	3 July 2003	New Caledonia	19 May 2004	New Caledonia	
Kavakava Manumua	GK	5	0	5 July 2003	Micronesia	3 September 2007	Vanuatu	
Sione Tahiua	MF	5	0	27 August 2007	Solomon Islands	13 June 2009	Cook Islands	
Semisi Tu'ifangaloka	DF	5	0	27 August 2007	Solomon Islands	13 June 2009	Cook Islands	
Semisi 'Otukolo	GK	5	0	12 December 2017	Fiji	18 July 2019	Papua New Guinea	
Lopeti Kafoa	FW	4	0	11 November 1996	Cook Islands	1 March 1997	Solomon Islands	
Sitivi Sikulu	MF	4	0	11 November 1996	Cook Islands	1 March 1997	Solomon Islands	
Kiliti Taufahema	DF	4	0	11 November 1996	Cook Islands	1 March 1997	Solomon Islands	
Wame Tolutau	DF	4	0	11 November 1996	Cook Islands	1 March 1997	Solomon Islands	
Ahosivi Unufe	DF	4	0	11 November 1996	Cook Islands	1 March 1997	Solomon Islands	
Silio Vea	MF	4	0	11 November 1996	Cook Islands	1 March 1997	Solomon Islands	
Siale Vea	MF	4	0	11 November 1996	Cook Islands	1 March 1997	Solomon Islands	
Hateni Manu	FW	4	0	7 April 2001	Samoa	16 April 2001	Fiji	
Penisimani Pau	MF	4	0	1 July 2003	Papua New Guinea	7 July 2003	Tahiti	
Alisione Taufahema	MF	4	0	1 July 2003	Papua New Guinea	7 July 2003	Tahiti	
Petelo Vaihu	DF	4	0	1 July 2003	Papua New Guinea	7 July 2003	Tahiti	
Kaneti Felela	GK	4	0	13 June 2009	Cook Islands	26 November 2011	Cook Islands	
Oliveti Vai	MF	4	0	19 August 2015	Fiji	4 September 2015	Samoa	
Tevita Vakatapu	DF	4	0	2 December 2017	Vanuatu	14 December 2017	Tuvalu	
Tevita Tukimaka	FW	4	0	6 December 2017	Vanuatu	14 December 2017	Tuvalu	
Taniela Fonu'a	MF	3	0	7 April 2001	Samoa	14 March 2002	Papua New Guinea	
Timote Polovili		3	0	9 March 2002	Samoa	16 March 2002	New Caledonia	
Mafi Katilimoni		3	0	12 March 2002	American Samoa	16 March 2002	New Caledonia	
Mekilani Fotu	MF	3	0	10 May 2004	Solomon Islands	19 May 2004	New Caledonia	
Viliami Vaitaki	FW	3	0	15 May 2004	Cook Islands	26 November 2011	Cook Islands	
Siosifa Moimoi	MF	3	0	22 November 2011	American Samoa	26 November 2011	Cook Islands	
Kinitoni Falatau	FW	3	1	22 November 2011	American Samoa	26 November 2011	Cook Islands	
Niuvalu Fifita	MF	3	0	19 August 2015	Fiji	4 September 2015	Samoa	
Sinilau Taufa	GK	3	0	19 August 2015	Fiji	15 July 2019	Vanuatu	
Petueli Tokotaha	DF	3	0	2 December 2017	Solomon Islands	14 December 2017	Tuvalu	
Lachman 'Atoa	DF	3	0	12 July 2019	Samoa	18 July 2019	Papua New Guinea	
Sioeli Fakahafua	DF	3	0	12 July 2019	Samoa	18 July 2019	Papua New Guinea	
Tuia Falepapalangi	MF	3	0	12 July 2019	Samoa	18 July 2019	Papua New Guinea	
Pita Huni	FW	3	0	12 July 2019	Samoa	18 July 2019	Papua New Guinea	
Amone Leao	DF	2	0	11 November 1996	Cook Islands	1 March 1997	Solomon Islands	
Siosaia Vave	DF	2	0	11 November 1996	Cook Islands	15 November 1996	Samoa	
Tu'ahiva Fincfeuiaki	GK	2	0	7 April 2001	Samoa	9 April 2001	Australia	
Lopeti Fuimaono	MF	2	0	7 April 2001	Samoa	16 April 2001	Fiji	
Akoli Mafi	MF	2	0	9 April 2001	Australia	16 April 2001	Fiji	
Hewel Fifita	MF	2	1	9 March 2002	Samoa	12 March 2002	American Samoa	
Lisaniasi Kainga	DF	2	0	1 September 2007	American Samoa	3 September 2007	Vanuatu	
Matana Paongo	DF	2	0	1 September 2007	American Samoa	3 September 2007	Vanuatu	
Maake Uhatahi	FW	2	0	11 June 2009	Cook Islands	13 June 2009	Cook Islands	
Timote Maamaloa	MF	2	1	22 November 2011	American Samoa	26 November 2011	Cook Islands	
Anthony Likiliki	MF	2	0	2 September 2015	American Samoa	4 September 2015	Samoa	
Samisoni Maasi	MF	2	0	2 September 2015	American Samoa	4 September 2015	Samoa	
Aisea Muli	MF	2	0	2 December 2017	Solomon Islands	14 December 2017	Tuvalu	
Sione Tu'ifangaloka	DF	2	0	8 December 2017	New Caledonia	12 December 2017	Fiji	
Sitaleki Fisi	MF	2	0	15 July 2019	Vanuatu	18 July 2019	Papua New Guinea	
Petiasi Vaihu	FW	1	0	15 February 1997	Solomon Islands	15 February 1997	Solomon Islands	
Sione Vakalahi	MF	1	0	1 March 1997	Solomon Islands	1 March 1997	Solomon Islands	
Toakai Toto	DF	1	0	9 April 2001	Australia	9 April 2001	Australia	
Falame Ilangana	DF	1	0	14 April 2001	American Samoa	14 April 2001	American Samoa	
Tauelangi Faiva		1	0	12 March 2002	American Samoa	12 March 2002	American Samoa	
Mexico Vailea		1	0	12 March 2002	American Samoa	12 March 2002	American Samoa	
Amone Suli	MF	1	3	12 March 2002	American Samoa	12 March 2002	American Samoa	
Petesa Ongosia	DF	1	0	5 July 2003	Micronesia	5 July 2003	Micronesia	
Finau Feao	DF	1	0	17 May 2004	Tahiti	17 May 2004	Tahiti	
Suliasi Fotu	DF	1	0	19 May 2004	New Caledonia	19 May 2004	New Caledonia	
Sitiveni Tafolo	GK	1	0	19 May 2004	New Caledonia	19 May 2004	New Caledonia	
Alalaite Tuakalau	FW	1	0	19 May 2004	New Caledonia	19 May 2004	New Caledonia	
Tevita Takai	MF	1	0	27 August 2007	Solomon Islands	27 August 2007	Solomon Islands	
Kaliopasi Uele	DF	1	0	1 September 2007	American Samoa	1 September 2007	American Samoa	
Halakinikini Kau	GK	1	0	3 September 2007	Vanuatu	3 September 2007	Vanuatu	
Ateneo Feao	MF	1	0	13 June 2009	Cook Islands	13 June 2009	Cook Islands	
Vava Moeaki	DF	1	0	13 June 2009	Cook Islands	13 June 2009	Cook Islands	
Peni Pau	MF	1	0	13 June 2009	Cook Islands	13 June 2009	Cook Islands	
Apolosi Atuekaho	DF	1	0	19 August 2015	Fiji	19 August 2015	Fiji	
Sipiloni Sila	DF	1	0	19 August 2015	Fiji	19 August 2015	Fiji	
Sione Lelenga	DF	1	0	31 August 2015	Cook Islands	31 August 2015	Cook Islands	
Lisala Tuipulotu	DF	1	0	4 September 2015	Samoa	4 September 2015	Samoa	
Timote Fakasi'i'eiki	FW	1	0	12 July 2019	Samoa	12 July 2019	Samoa	
O'faloto Kite	DF	1	0	12 July 2019	Samoa	12 July 2019	Samoa	
David Anau	GK	1	0	18 July 2019	Papua New Guinea	18 July 2019	Papua New Guinea	
