= Taylor Saghabi =

Cook Islands football player (born 1990)

Personal information
- Full name: Taylor Andrew Marsters-Saghabi
- Date of birth: 25 December 1990 (age 35)
- Place of birth: Sydney, Australia
- Height: 1.78 m (5 ft 10 in)
- Positions: Midfielder; forward

Youth career
- 2003: Parramatta FC
- 2004: Hills United FC
- 2005–2006: Parramatta Eagles
- 2007: Manly United FC
- 2008–2009: Blacktown City Demons
- 2009: Sydney Olympic FC
- 2010: Dulwich Hill FC

Senior career*
Years	Team	Apps	(Gls)
- West Ryde Rovers
- Chinchilla Bears
2015–2016	La Onda	11	(3)
2023	Tupapa Maraerenga	0	(0)

International career^{‡}
2011–2024	Cook Islands	19	(7)
- * Club domestic league appearances and goals ‡ National team caps and goals as of 26 March 2024

Taylor Andrew Marsters-Saghabi (born 25 December 1990) is a Cook Islands former international footballer and golfer who played as an midfielder and forward. Born in Australia, he represented the Cook Islands national team.

He originates from Palmerston Island and is a direct descendant of William Marsters.

He is the all-time leading goalscorer of the Cook Islands national team, with 7 in total.

== Career ==
Saghabi played for various youth clubs in Australia's lower divisions, before stepping into senior football with local sunday league team West Ryde Rovers. In 2011, Saghabi trialled successfully for the Cook Islands in Rarotonga, and would make his debut for the national team on 27 August 2011 in a 4–0 loss against Papua New Guinea. He scored his first 2 international goals against Kiribati in a 3–0 win. He was used as a backup for the squad for 2014 FIFA World Cup qualification.

From 2015 to 2016, he played for La Onda. He was later selected for the national team's historic campaign in the 2018 FIFA World Cup under British coach Drew Sherman. He would score the nation's first ever hattrick in a subsequent 3–0 opening victory against hosts Tonga. He would then feature in a match against favourites Samoa, managing to find the decisive goal with a rasping freekick into the top corner. He would then go into the final match against American Samoa, a match Cook Islands lost 2–0.

In 2018, he represented Aitutaki in the 2018 Cook Islands Games football tournament, where his team finished runners-up to Avarua.

Saghabi was selected for Tupapa Maraerenga in the 2023 OFC Champions League qualifying stage, scoring 3 goals in 3 matches, but his side ultimately lost to home side Lupe o le Soaga 7–1, failing to qualify. He would later feature in a one-off match in the 2022 FIFA World Cup qualification, both of the Cook Islands' games at the 2023 Pacific Games, as well as friendlies against Tahiti, the 2024 OFC Men's Nations Cup, where he would score the decisive goal against Tonga in a 1–0 win, then receiving his final callup for the 2026 FIFA World Cup qualification.

He is a part of the Cumberland Country Golf Club.

== Career statistics ==
=== International ===
Cook Islands
Year	Apps	Goals
2011	7	2
2015	3	4
2022	1	0
2023	4	0
2024	4	1
Total	19	7

Statistics accurate as of match played 26 March 2024

== International goals ==
Scores and results list. Cook Islands's goal tally first.

No.	Date	Venue	Opponent	Score	Result	Competition	Ref.
1.	1 September 2011	Stade Boewa, Boulari Bay, New Caledonia (Note: Not officially recognised by FIFA as a Tier 1 International Match.)	Kiribati	1–0	3–0	2011 Pacific Games	
2.	1 September 2011	Stade Boewa, Boulari Bay, New Caledonia	Kiribati	2–0	3–0	2011 Pacific Games	
3.	31 August 2015	Loto-Tonga Soka Centre, Nuku'alofa, Tonga	Tonga	1–0	3–0	2018 FIFA World Cup qualification	
4.	31 August 2015	Loto-Tonga Soka Centre, Nuku'alofa, Tonga	Tonga	2–0	3–0	2018 FIFA World Cup qualification	
5.	31 August 2015	Loto-Tonga Soka Centre, Nuku'alofa, Tonga	Tonga	3–0	3–0	2018 FIFA World Cup qualification	
6.	2 September 2015	Loto-Tonga Soka Centre, Nuku'alofa, Tonga	Samoa	1–0	1–0	2018 FIFA World Cup qualification	
7.	26 March 2024	Teufaiva Stadium, Nuku'alofa, Tonga	Tonga	1–0	1–0	2024 OFC Nations Cup qualification	
