= Frederick Hale =

Frederick Hale or Fred Hale may refer to:

- Frederick Harding Hale (1844–1912), member of Canadian Parliament
- Frederick Albert Hale (1855–1934), American architect
- Frederick Marten Hale (1864–1931), British explosives engineer and inventor
- Frederick Hale (American politician) (1874–1963), U.S. senator from Maine
- Fred Harold Hale (1890–2004), American supercentenarian, former oldest living man
- Fred Hale (footballer) (born 1979), Solomon Islands footballer

== See also ==
- Frederic Hale Parkhurst (1864–1921), 52nd Governor of Maine
