= Cade Mapu =

Cook Islands footballer

Personal information
- Date of birth: 5 December 1997 (age 28)
- Position: Forward

Team information
- Current team: Central Coast United

Youth career
- 2011–2017: Central Coast Mariners

Senior career*
| Years | Team | Apps | (Gls) |
| 2016–2017 | Central Coast Mariners Academy | 12 | (0) |
| 2017–2018 | Lambton Jaffas | 0 | (0) |
| 2018– | Central Coast United | 150 | |

International career^{‡}
| 2026– | Cook Islands | 3 | (0) |

Managerial career
- 2020–2022: Central Coast Mariners (sports scientist)
- 2022–: Central Coast Mariners (fitness coach)
- * Club domestic league appearances and goals as of 6 June 2026 ‡ National team caps and goals as of 14 November 2026

Cade Mapu (born 5 December 1997) is an international footballer for Central Coast United and the Cook Islands national team. He is also a fitness coach for the Central Coast Mariners.

Raised on the Central Coast of New South Wales, Mapu played youth football for Central Coast Mariners. After leaving the Mariners, Mapu played for Central Coast United, making over 150 appearances for the club. Mapu later returned to the Mariners as a fitness coach.

Mapu has made two appearances for the Cook Islands national football team.

== Early life ==
Mapu was raised in Lisarow on the Central Coast of New South Wales. In addition to football, he was a competitive surf lifesaver and member of Wamberal Surf Club. He attended Lisarow High School. Cade has an older brother, Ridge, who was also a footballer.

== Club career ==
=== Youth ===
Mapu joined the youth academy of A-League side Central Coast Mariners in 2011. He remained at the Mariners until 2017, when he signed with National Premier Leagues Northern NSW team Lambton Jaffas, featuring his brother Ridge, while recovering from an anterior cruciate ligament injury. However, Mapu did not end up playing for the club after his signing fell through.

=== Central Coast United ===
Rather than Lambton, Mapu joined Central Coast United, making 24 appearances and scoring nine goals in the 2018 NSW State League, which was also Central Coast's first in the competition. In the 2018 State League grand final, Mapu scored for Central Coast as they defeated Bankstown to win the Championship. In 2026, Mapu was named captain of the side in Football NSW League Two.

== International career ==
In March 2024, Mapu was called up to the Cook Islands squad for 2024 OFC Men's Nations Cup qualification.

Mapu was again selected in the Cook Islands squad in September 2026 for friendly matches against Tahiti in Rarotonga, the team's first home matches in almost thirty years. Mapu made his international debut in the first match of the series, a loss, and played a significant role in the team's 3–2 win in the second match, their first ever win over Tahiti.

== Coaching career ==
Mapu returned to Central Coast Mariners as a fitness coach and was promoted to Lead Strength and Conditioning Coach in 2024.

== Style of play ==
Speaking in 2017, Lambton Jaffas coach James Pascoe noted Mapu's pace and technical ability.

== Career statistics ==
As of match played 30 September 2026

Appearances and goals by national team and year
| National team | Year | Apps | Goals |
|---|---|---|---|
| Cook Islands | 2026 | 2 | 0 |
| Total | | 2 | 0 |

== Honours ==
Central Coast United

- Football NSW State League Championship: 2018

== See also ==
- List of Cook Islands international footballers
