= Turepu =

Turepu is a surname. Notable people with the surname include:

- Branden Turepu (born 1990), Cook Islander footballer
- Kiriau Turepu, Cook Islander politician
- Paul Farrell-Turepu, Cook Islander football manager
