= Laybutt =

Laybutt is a surname. Notable people with the surname include:

- Stephen Laybutt (1977–2024), Australian footballer
- Kyle Laybutt (born 1995), Papua New Guinea rugby league footballer
- Zac Laybutt (born 2002), Australian rugby league footballer
