= George Cowie =

Scottish footballer and coach

Personal information
- Full name: Alexander George Cowie
- Date of birth: 9 May 1961 (age 65)
- Place of birth: Buckie, Scotland
- Position: Full back

Youth career
- 1977–1982: West Ham United

Senior career*
Years	Team	Apps	(Gls)
1982–1983	West Ham United	8	(0)
1983–1987	Heart of Midlothian	68	(2)
1986–1987	→ Morton (loan)	3	(2)
1987–1988	Dunfermline Athletic	14	(0)
1988–1989	Deveronvale		
1989–1991	Morton	24	(0)
1991	Forres Mechanics		
Total		117	(4)

Managerial career
- Papua New Guinea U23
- Solomon Islands
Medal record
Men's football
Representing Solomon Islands (as manager)
OFC Nations Cup
Third place	2000 Tahiti
- * Club domestic league appearances and goals

Alexander George Cowie (born 9 May 1961) is a Scottish former professional football player and coach.

== Career ==
Born in Buckie, Cowie joined West Ham United as an apprentice in 1977, turning professional in 1978. He made his senior debut on 13 April 1982, in a Division 1 match against Ipswich Town coming on as a substitute for Jimmy Neighbour. He later played for Heart of Midlothian, Morton, Dunfermline Athletic, Deveronvale and Forres Mechanics, both latter clubs play in the Scottish Highland Football League.

After retiring as a player, Cowie was active as a coach in Oceania, where he served as manager of the Papua New Guinea national under-23 team and the Solomon Islands national team.

After relocating to Queensland, Australia he coached Brisbane club, Wynnum Wolves to win the Queensland Cup, their first major trophy in 77 years. He also coached Sunshine Coast FC to a Premiership Double and was voted "Queensland Coach of the Year" in 2008. He holds a UEFA A License as a qualified coach and has worked as coach instructor for Football Federation Australia and as a technical manager of Football Queensland.

Cowie operates "George Cowie Football" based in Queensland which provides coaching and training camps for aspiring footballers across Australia and works in conjunction with English Premier League club, West Ham United.

== Honours ==
=== Player ===
Heart of Midlothian

- Scottish Cup runner-up: 1985–86

=== Manager ===
Solomon Islands

- OFC Nations Cup: 3rd place 2000
