= Polynesia Cup =

International football tournament in Oceania

The Polynesia Cup (French: Coupe de Polynésie) was a football tournament for Polynesian nations within the Oceania Football Confederation. It acted along with the Melanesia Cup as a qualifying tournament for the OFC Nations Cup. The last tournament was played in 2000.

The tournament involved a round-robin format where every team played each other once at the location of the tournament.

In the first tournament in 1994, Tahiti, fielding a young and inexperienced team, beat Tonga 1-0, American Samoa 2-0 and Western Samoa 7-0. Lolani Koko, a multisport athlete, captained the Western Samoan team. He had competed as a runner in the 1982 Commonwealth Games and was also an international rugby player for Western Samoa.

== Participating nations ==
- American Samoa
- Cook Islands
- Samoa
- Tahiti
- Tonga

== Results ==
Year	Host	Champion	Runners-up	Third place
1994	Western Samoa	Tahiti	Tonga	Western Samoa
1998	Cook Islands	Tahiti	Cook Islands	Western Samoa
2000	French Polynesia	Tahiti	Cook Islands	Samoa

== Records ==
=== Total Wins ===
3	Tahiti	1994, 1998, 2000

=== All-time table ===
Rank	Team	Part	Pld	W	D	L	GF	GA	GD	Pts
1	Tahiti	3	11	11	0	0	67	4	+63	33
2	Samoa (Note: Includes participations as Western Samoa from 1994.)	3	11	5	1	5	26	23	+3	16
3	Cook Islands	2	8	5	1	2	16	16	0	16
4	Tonga	3	11	3	2	6	13	28	–15	11
5	American Samoa	3	11	0	0	11	8	59	–51	0

== 1994 ==
Polynesia Cup
Tournament details
- Host country: Western Samoa
- Teams: 4 (from 1 confederation)

Final positions
- Champions: Tahiti (1st title)
- Runners-up: Tonga
- Third place: Western Samoa

Tournament statistics
- Matches played: 6
- Goals scored: 22 (3.67 per match)

The Polynesia Cup 1994 was the first Polynesia-wide tournament ever held. It took place in Western Samoa (later known as Samoa) and four teams participated: Tahiti, Western Samoa, American Samoa and Tonga and served for the first time as OFC Nations Cup qualifier.

The teams played each other according to a round-robin format with Tahiti winning the tournament for the first time and qualifying to the 1996 OFC Nations Cup.

=== Results ===
Pos	Team	Pld	W	D	L	GF	GA	GD	Pts	Qualification
1	Tahiti (C)	3	3	0	0	10	1	+9	9	Qualify for 1996 OFC Nations Cup
2	Tonga	3	1	1	1	4	4	0	4	
3	Western Samoa (H)	3	1	1	1	5	10	−5	4	
4	American Samoa	3	0	0	3	3	7	−4	0	

(C) Champions; (H) Hosts
24 November 1994

Tahiti	1–0	Tonga

Western Samoa

24 November 1994

Western Samoa	3–1	American Samoa

Western Samoa

25 November 1994

Tahiti	2–1	American Samoa

Western Samoa

25 November 1994

Western Samoa	2–2	Tonga

Western Samoa

28 November 1994

Tonga	2–1	American Samoa

Western Samoa

28 November 1994

Western Samoa	0–7	Tahiti

Western Samoa

Tahiti qualified for Oceania Nations Cup 1996

== 1998 ==
Polynesia Cup
Tournament details
- Host country: Cook Islands
- Teams: 5 (from 1 confederation)

Final positions
- Champions: Tahiti (2nd title)
- Runners-up: Cook Islands
- Third place: Samoa

Tournament statistics
- Matches played: 10
- Goals scored: 51 (5.1 per match)

The Polynesia Cup 1998 was the second Polynesia-wide tournament ever held. It took place in Cook Islands and five teams participated: Tahiti, Samoa, American Samoa, Tonga and the hosts Cook Islands for the first time and served for the second time as OFC Nations Cup qualifier.

The teams played each other according to a round-robin format with Tahiti national football winning the tournament for the second time and qualifying to the Oceania Nations Cup 1998 along with Cook Islands.

=== Results ===
Pos	Team	Pld	W	D	L	GF	GA	GD	Pts	Qualification
1	Tahiti (C)	4	4	0	0	27	1	+26	12	Qualify for 1998 OFC Nations Cup
2	Cook Islands (H)	4	2	1	1	8	11	−3	7	Qualify for 1998 OFC Nations Cup
3	Samoa	4	2	0	2	8	7	+1	6	
4	Tonga	4	1	1	2	5	9	−4	4	
5	American Samoa	4	0	0	4	3	23	−20	0	

(C) Champions; (H) Hosts
2 September 1998

Cook Islands	2–1	Samoa

Cook Islands
2 September 1998

Tonga	3–0	American Samoa

Cook Islands

3 September 1998

Tahiti	5–0	Tonga

Cook Islands
3 September 1998

Cook Islands	4–3	American Samoa

Cook Islands

5 September 1998

Tahiti	5–1	Samoa

Cook Islands
5 September 1998

Cook Islands	2–2	Tonga

Cook Islands

7 September 1998

Samoa	2–0	Tonga

Cook Islands
7 September 1998

Tahiti	12–0	American Samoa

Cook Islands

8 September 1998

Samoa	4–0	American Samoa

Cook Islands
8 September 1998

Cook Islands	0–5	Tahiti

Cook Islands

Tahiti and Cook Islands qualified for Oceania Nations Cup 1998

== 2000 ==
Polynesia Cup
Tournament details
- Host country: Tahiti
- Teams: 5 (from 1 confederation)

Final positions
- Champions: Tahiti (3rd title)
- Runners-up: Cook Islands
- Third place: Samoa

Tournament statistics
- Matches played: 10
- Goals scored: 56 (5.6 per match)

The Polynesia Cup 2000 was the third Polynesia-wide football tournament ever held. It took place in Tahiti and five teams participated: Tahiti, Samoa, American Samoa, Tonga and Cook Islands and served for the third time as OFC Nations Cup qualifier.

The teams played each other according to a round-robin format with Tahiti winning the tournament for the third time and qualifying to the Oceania Nations Cup 2000 along with Cook Islands.

=== Results ===
Pos	Team	Pld	W	D	L	GF	GA	GD	Pts	Qualification
1	Tahiti (C, H)	4	4	0	0	30	2	+28	12	Qualify for 2000 OFC Nations Cup
2	Cook Islands	4	3	0	1	8	5	+3	9	Qualify for 2000 OFC Nations Cup
3	Samoa	4	2	0	2	13	6	+7	6	
4	Tonga	4	1	0	3	4	15	−11	3	
5	American Samoa	4	0	0	4	2	29	−27	0	

(C) Champions; (H) Hosts
6 June 2000

Tonga	0–4	Samoa

Paranuu Stadium, Papeete
6 June 2000

Tahiti	18–0	American Samoa

Paranuu Stadium, Papeete

8 June 2000

Tahiti	2–1	Samoa

Paranuu Stadium, Papeete
8 June 2000

Cook Islands	2–1	Tonga
G.Mani (?); Te Miha (?)

Paranuu Stadium, Papeete

10 June 2000

Tahiti	8–1	Tonga

Paranuu Stadium, Papeete
10 June 2000

Cook Islands	3–0	American Samoa
N.Mani (?); Jamieson (?); Drollett (?)

Paranuu Stadium, Papeete

12 June 2000

Samoa	6–1	American Samoa

Paranuu Stadium, Papeete
12 June 2000

Tahiti	2–0	Cook Islands

Paranuu Stadium, Papeete

14 June 2000

Tonga	2–1	American Samoa

Paranuu Stadium, Papeete
June 2000

Cook Islands	3–2	Samoa

Paranuu Stadium, Papeete

Tahiti and Cook Islands qualified for Oceania Nations Cup 2000
