= Hinoi Henry =

Cook Islands footballer

Personal information
- Full name: Hinoi Henry
- Date of birth: 16 June 1981 (age 45)
- Place of birth: Cook Islands
- Position: Midfielder

Senior career*
Years	Team	Apps	(Gls)
1999–????	Puaikura		

International career^{‡}
2000	Cook Islands	2	(0)
- * Club domestic league appearances and goals as of 31 July 2013 ‡ National team caps and goals as of 31 July 2013

Hinoi Henry (born 16 June 1981) in Cook Islands is a footballer who plays as a midfielder. He currently plays for Puaikura and the Cook Islands national football team.
