= Justin Shepherd =

Cook Islands footballer

Personal information
- Full name: Justin Shepherd
- Date of birth: 8 June 1981 (age 45)
- Place of birth: Cook Islands
- Position: Midfielder

Team information
- Current team: Nikao Sokattack

Senior career*
Years	Team	Apps	(Gls)
2000–	Nikao Sokattack		

International career^{‡}
2001–	Cook Islands	3	(0)
- * Club domestic league appearances and goals as of 29 July 2013 ‡ National team caps and goals as of 29 July 2013

Justin Shepherd (born 8 June 1981) in the Cook Islands is a footballer who played as a midfielder for Nikao Sokattack F.C. in the Cook Islands Round Cup and the Cook Islands national football team.
