= Junior Puroku =

Cook Islands footballer

Personal information
- Full name: Junior Puroku
- Date of birth: 26 January 1981 (age 45)
- Place of birth: Cook Islands
- Position: Midfielder

Team information
- Current team: Tupapa Maraerenga

Senior career*
Years	Team	Apps	(Gls)
1999–	Tupapa Maraerenga		

International career^{‡}
2000–	Cook Islands	7	(1)
- * Club domestic league appearances and goals as of 29 July 2013 ‡ National team caps and goals as of 29 July 2013

Junior Puroku (born 26 January 1981) in the Cook Islands is a footballer who played as a midfielder for Tupapa Maraerenga in the Cook Islands Round Cup and the Cook Islands national football team.
