= 2024 OFC Men's Nations Cup qualification =

Continental football qualifying tournament

Tournament details
- Host country: Tonga
- Dates: 20–26 March
- Teams: 3 (from 1 confederation)
- Venue: 1 (in 1 host city)

Tournament statistics
- Matches played: 3
- Goals scored: 7 (2.33 per match)
- Attendance: 1,300 (433 per match)
- Top scorer(s): (Samoa) Nathan Viliamu (2 goals)

The 2024 OFC Men's Nations Cup qualifying round served as qualification for the 2024 OFC Men's Nations Cup. This tournament marked the first time since 2002 that qualification for the OFC Nations Cup was not held in conjunction with the FIFA World Cup qualification rounds for OFC. Tonga was confirmed as qualification hosts on 1 December 2023. The tournament took place from 20 to 26 March 2024.

== Qualified teams ==
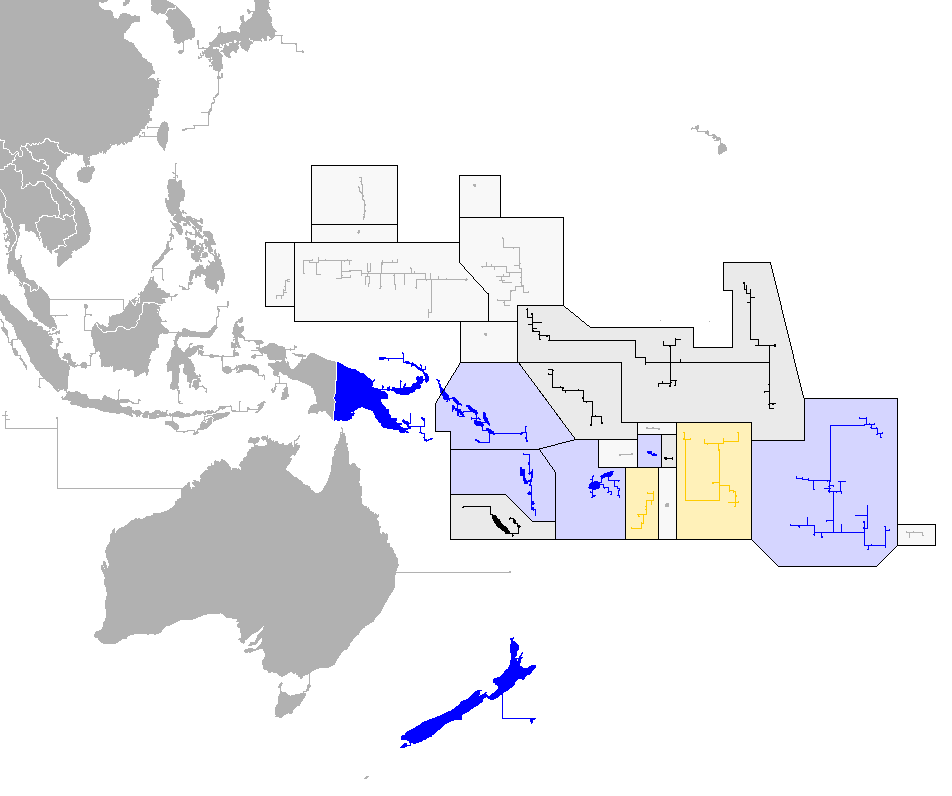
Status of nations with respect to the 2024 OFC Men's Nations Cup: Qualified Failed to qualify Withdrew or suspended Not a member of the OFC

Team	Qualified as	Qualified on	Previous appearances in tournament (Note: Bold indicates champions for that year. Italic indicates hosts for that year.)
Vanuatu (Note: From 1973 and 1980, Vanuatu competed as the New Hebrides.)	Co-hosts	1 December 2023	9 (1973, 1980, 1998, 2000, 2002, 2004, 2008, 2012, 2016)
Fiji	Co-hosts	24 January 2024	8 (1973, 1980, 1998, 2002, 2004, 2008, 2012, 2016)
~~New Caledonia~~ (Note: New Caledonia withdrew from the tournament on 5 June 2024 due to the social unrest in the country.)	Automatic qualification	~~24 January 2024~~	~~6 (1973, 1980, 2002, 2008, 2012, 2016)~~
New Zealand	Automatic qualification	24 January 2024	10 (**1973**, 1980, 1996, **1998**, 2000, **2002**, 2004, **2008**, 2012, **2016**)
Papua New Guinea	Automatic qualification	24 January 2024	4 (1980, 2002, 2012, 2016)
Solomon Islands	Automatic qualification	24 January 2024	7 (1980, 1996, 2000, 2002, 2004, 2012, 2016)
Tahiti	Automatic qualification	24 January 2024	9 (1973, 1980, 1996, 1998, 2000, 2002, 2004, **2012**, 2016)
Samoa	Qualifying tournament winners	23 March 2024	2 (2012, 2016)

== Format ==
Three teams played a single round-robin tournament held in Tonga. All matches were held at the Teufaiva Sport Stadium in Nuku'alofa. The winner qualified for the 2024 OFC Men's Nations Cup, to join the other seven teams which received byes into the group stage.

== Entrants ==
Three teams entered qualification. This edition marked the first time since the 1996 edition that American Samoa did not enter the tournament. Numbers in parentheses refer to each team's ranking in the December 2023 FIFA World Rankings.

OFC members that did not qualify automatically
Entered qualification	Did not enter qualification	Ineligible as associate member
1. Cook Islands (185); 2. Samoa (186); 3. Tonga (196)	American Samoa (188)	Kiribati (N/A); Tuvalu (N/A)

== Schedule ==
The schedule of the competition was as follows.

Matchday	Date
Matchday 1	20 March 2024
Matchday 2	23 March 2024
Matchday 3	26 March 2024

== Venue ==
All qualifying matches were played in one host city, Nuku'alofa in Tonga.

Tonga
Nuku'alofa
Teufaiva Sport Stadium
Capacity: 10,000
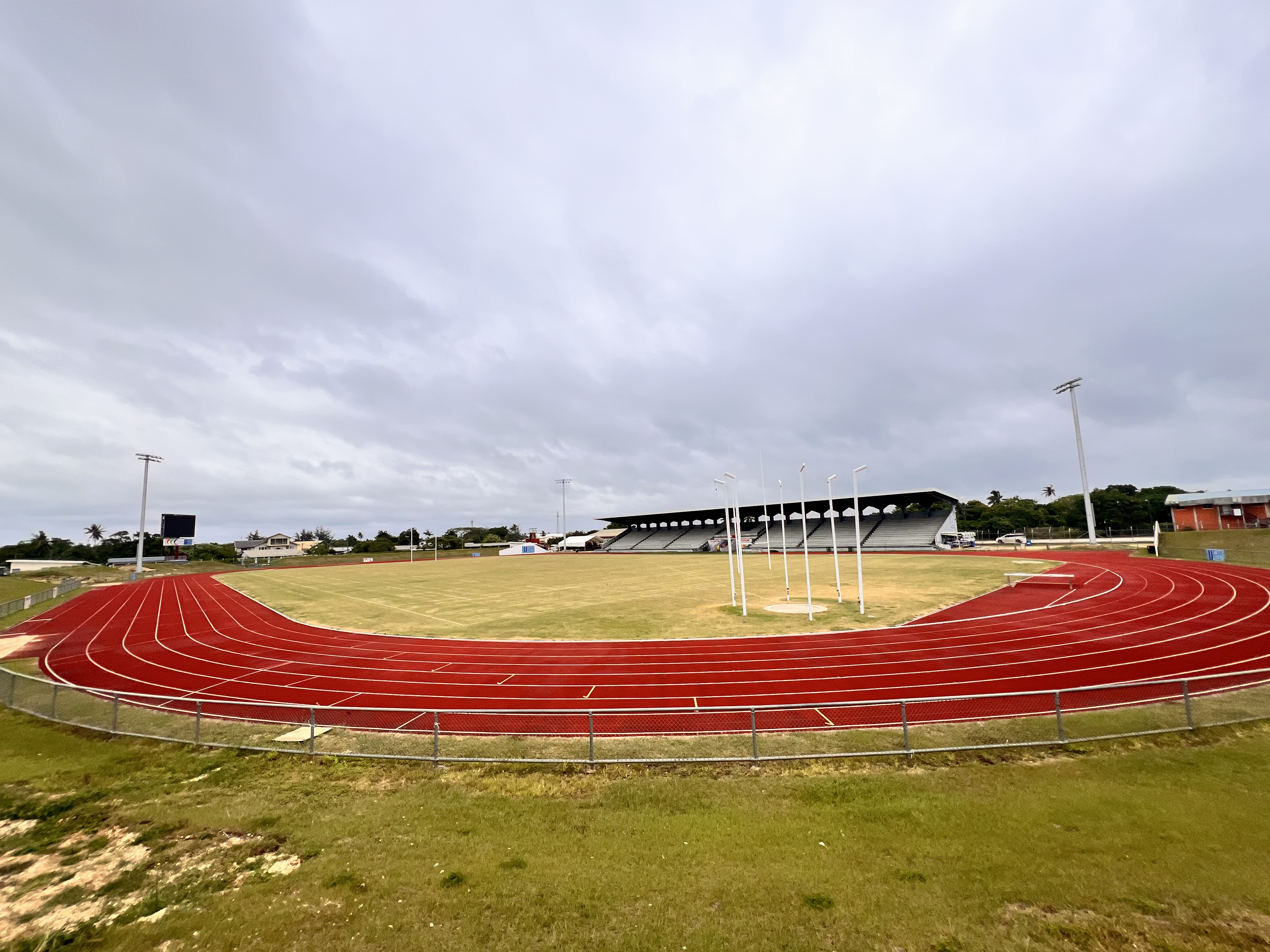

== Standings ==
Pos	Team	Pld	W	D	L	GF	GA	GD	Pts	Qualification	Samoa	Cook Islands	Tonga
1	Samoa	2	2	0	0	5	1	+4	6	Qualify for final tournament	—	1–0	—
2	Cook Islands	2	1	0	1	1	1	0	3		—	—	1–0
3	Tonga (H)	2	0	0	2	1	5	−4	0		1–4	—	—

Source: OFC
(H) Hosts

== Matches ==
20 March 2024
14:00 UTC+13

Tonga	1–4	Samoa
Kite 90+5'	Report	Tumua 11' (pen.); Viliamu 45+1', 60'; Stowers 89'

Teufaiva Sport Stadium, Nukuʻalofa
Attendance: 500
Referee: Luke Gardner (New Zealand)

23 March 2024
11:00 UTC+13

Samoa	1–0	Cook Islands
Taualai 88'	Report

Teufaiva Sport Stadium, Nukuʻalofa
Attendance: 300
Referee: Pari Oito (Tahiti)

26 March 2024
14:00 UTC+13

Cook Islands	1–0	Tonga
Saghabi 38'	Report

Teufaiva Sport Stadium, Nukuʻalofa
Attendance: 500
Referee: Laurie Fairamoa (Solomon Islands)

== Goalscorers ==
There were 7 goals scored in 3 matches, for an average of 2.33 goals per match.

2 goals

- (Samoa) Nathan Viliamu

1 goal

- (Cook Islands) Taylor Saghabi
- (Samoa) Ethan Stowers
- (Samoa) Va'a Taualai
- (Samoa) Dilo Tumua
- (Tonga) Kulisitofa Kite

Source: OFC
