= Alan Taylor (footballer, born 1943) =

English footballer

Personal information
- Date of birth: 17 May 1943 (age 83)
- Place of birth: Thornton-Cleveleys, Lancashire, England
- Position: Goalkeeper

Youth career
- –1963: Blackpool Rangers

Senior career*
| Years | Team | Apps | (Gls) |
| 1963–1971 | Blackpool | 94 | (0) |
| 1969–1970 | → Oldham Athletic (loan) | 2 | (0) |
| 1970–1971 | → Stockport County (loan) | 5 | (0) |
| 1970 | → Fleetwood (loan) | 4 | (0) |
| 1971–1974 | Southport | 102 | (0) |
| Total | | 207 | (0) |
- * Club domestic league appearances and goals

Alan Taylor (born 17 May 1943) is an English former football player who played as a goalkeeper.

== Playing career ==
Taylor began his professional career with Blackpool in 1963 after joining from local club Blackpool Rangers.

Due to the form of Tony Waiters, Taylor didn't make his league debut for Blackpool until 29 January 1966, keeping a clean sheet in a goalless draw with Fulham at Craven Cottage. Another goalless draw followed, this time against Tottenham at Bloomfield Road, before Waiters returned to the fold for the remainder of the 1966–67 season.

The following season, 1967–68, Taylor made only two early- one late-season league appearances in Waiters' absence. When Waiters left to become a coach at Liverpool in April 1967, thus missing Blackpool's final six games of the season, manager Stan Mortensen favoured another goalkeeper – Kevin Thomas – for five of the games.

Thomas also started the first the games of the 1967–68 league season, before Taylor finally made the number-one jersey his own, appearing between the sticks for Blackpool's remaining 39 league games.

In 1968–69, Taylor made 38 league appearances. He missed four games in late March and early April, at which point Thomas deputised, but he regained his place for the run-in.

Under new manager Les Shannon, Taylor made only three league appearances during Blackpool's successful 1969–70 campaign, in which they gained promotion to Division One as runners-up behind Huddersfield Town. He was loaned out to Oldham Athletic during the season.

In his final season at Blackpool, 1970–71, Taylor's appearances were again limited: just nine in the league. His final appearance for Blackpool occurred on 17 April 1971, in a 3–2 home defeat to Nottingham Forest. He was loaned out to Stockport County and Northern Premier League club Fleetwood during the season.

Taylor signed for Southport in 1971, and he finished his career with the Sandgrounders.
