= Fred Hale (footballer) =

Solomon Islands footballer

Personal information
- Full name: Fred Hale
- Date of birth: 17 July 1979 (age 47)
- Place of birth: Solomon Islands
- Position: Goalkeeper

Senior career*
Years	Team	Apps	(Gls)
2000–2005	Koloale FC Honiara		
2005–2006	East Harbour Strikers		
2006–2008	Koloale FC Honiara		
2008–	Marist FC		

International career
2000–2007	Solomon Islands	13	(0)
Medal record
Men's football
Representing Solomon Islands
OFC Nations Cup
Third place	2000 Tahiti
- * Club domestic league appearances and goals

Fred Hale (born 17 July 1979) is a footballer from the Solomon Islands. He currently plays as a goalkeeper for Marist FC in the Honiara FA League. Between 2000 and 2007, he won 13 caps for the Solomon Islands national football team.

== Honours ==
Solomon Islands

- OFC Nations Cup: 3rd place 2000
