= Campbell Best =

Cook Islands footballer

Personal information
- Full name: Campbell Best
- Date of birth: 12 March 1986 (age 40)
- Position: Forward

Team information
- Current team: Tupaa Maraerenga

Senior career*
Years	Team	Apps	(Gls)
2011–	Tupapa Maraerenga		
2016	Puaikura		

International career
2009–	Cook Islands	11	(3)
- * Club domestic league appearances and goals

Campbell Best (born 12 March 1986) is a Cook Islands footballer who plays as a forward for Tupapa Maraerenga.

== Career statistics ==
=== International ===
Cook Islands
Year	Apps	Goals
2009	1	1
2010	0	0
2011	6	2
2012	0	0
2013	0	0
2014	0	0
2015	3	0
Total	10	3

Statistics accurate as of match played 2 September 2015

=== International goals ===
Scores and results list. Cook Islands's goal tally first.

#	Date	Venue	Opponent	Score	Result	Competition	Ref
1.	13 June 2009	Tonga	Tonga	1–0	2–1	Friendly	
2.	22 November 2011	National Soccer Stadium, Apia, Samoa	Samoa	1–1	2–3	2014 FIFA WCQ OFC first round	
3.	22 November 2011	National Soccer Stadium, Apia, Samoa	Samoa	2–2	2–3	2014 FIFA WCQ OFC first round	
