= Tacettin Kumsuz =

Cook Islands association football player

Personal information
- Full name: Tacettin Kumsuz
- Date of birth: 6 January 1999 (age 27)
- Position: Midfielder

Team information
- Current team: UNSW FC
- Number: 8

Youth career
- 2016–2018: Western Sydney Wanderers

Senior career*
Years	Team	Apps	(Gls)
2016–2018	Western Sydney Wanderers	44	(1)
2018–2019	Wellington Phoenix Reserves	16	(0)
2019–2021	St George City	12	(1)
2024–2025	Al-Ittifaq	11	(1)
2025–	UNSW FC	3	(0)

International career^{‡}
2017	Australia U20		
2019	New Zealand U20		
2024–	Cook Islands	3	(1)
- * Club domestic league appearances and goals as of 13 April 2026 ‡ National team caps and goals as of 12 November 2026

Tacettin Kumsuz (born 6 January 1999) is a footballer who plays as a midfielder for National Premier Leagues NSW club UNSW FC. He plays for the Cook Islands national team.

== Club career ==
Kumsuz began his youth career with Western Sydney Wanderers, competing at senior level in the National Premier Leagues NSW 2 and at youth level in the National Youth League .

He departed the club in 2018, joining the reserve side of Wellington Phoenix, where he played 16 times in the New Zealand Football Championship.

He would then join St George City, playing in the NPL NSW 2.

After being without a club for some time, he joined Al-Ittifaq in the UAE Second Division League.

He joined UNSW FC in 2025, and gained promotion with them from the NSW League One to the National Premier Leagues NSW.

== International career ==
He was featured in the Australia men's national under-20 soccer team's training camp in 2017, and in New Zealand's under-20 training camp before the 2019 FIFA U-20 World Cup.

In 2024, Kumsuz committed to representing the Cook Islands internationally for the 2026 FIFA World Cup, making his debut in a 3-1 defeat to Tonga, in which he scored the only goal for the Cook Islands and also receiving a yellow card.

== Personal life ==
His brothers, Kerim, Eren and Tarik are all also footballers, all of whom also representing the Cook Islands.

He is of Turkish and Mitiaro descent.

== Career statistics ==
=== Club ===
As of match played 13 April 2026

Appearances and goals by club, season and competition
Club	Season	League			National cup		Continental		Other		Total	
Club	Season	Division	Apps	Goals	Apps	Goals	Apps	Goals	Apps	Goals	Apps	Goals
Western Sydney Wanderers Youth	2016	NPL NSW 2	12	0	—		—		—		12	0
Western Sydney Wanderers Youth	2017	NPL NSW 2	1	0	—		—		—		1	0
Western Sydney Wanderers Youth	2018	NPL NSW 2	17	1	—		—		—		17	1
Western Sydney Wanderers Youth	Total		30	0	0	0	0	0	0	0	30	0
Wellington Phoenix Reserves	2018–19	Premiership	16	0	—		—		—		16	0
St George City	2019	NPL NSW 2	10	1	—		—		—		10	1
St George City	2020	NPL NSW 2	2	0	—		—		—		2	0
St George City	2021	NPL NSW 2	—		—		—		—		—	
St George City	Total		12	1	—		—		—		12	1
Al-Ittifaq	2024–25	UAE Second Division League	11	1	—		—		—		11	1
UNSW FC	2025	NSW League One	—		—		—		—		—	
UNSW FC	2026	NPL NSW	3	0	—		—		—		3	0
UNSW FC	Total		3	0	—		—		—		3	0
Career total			72	3	0	0	0	0	0	0	72	3

=== International ===
As of match played 13 April 2026

Cook Islands
Year	Apps	Goals
2024	1	1
Total	1	1
