= Josh Stick =

New Zealand footballer (born 1980)

Personal information
- Full name: Josh Stick
- Date of birth: 12 February 1980 (age 46)
- Place of birth: New Zealand
- Position: Midfielder

International career
Years	Team	Apps	(Gls)
1997	New Zealand U-17		(0)
2000	New Zealand	1	(0)

Joshua Stick (born 12 February 1980) is a former football (soccer) player who represented New Zealand at international level.

He represented New Zealand at the 1997 FIFA U-17 World Championship, playing in all three group games.

Stick made a solitary official international appearance for the New Zealand national team in a 3–1 win over Vanuatu on 21 June 2000.
