= Christian Tauira =

Cook Islands footballer

Personal information
- Full name: Christian Tauira
- Date of birth: 6 July 1981 (age 45)
- Place of birth: Cook Islands
- Position: Midfielder

Team information
- Current team: Avatiu

Senior career*
Years	Team	Apps	(Gls)
1998–	Avatiu		

International career^{‡}
1998–	Cook Islands	11	(0)
- * Club domestic league appearances and goals as of 31 July 2013 ‡ National team caps and goals as of 31 July 2013

Christian Tauira (born 6 July 1981) in the Cook Islands is a footballer who plays as a midfielder. He currently plays for Avatiu in the Cook Islands Round Cup and the Cook Islands national football team.
