= Paul Farrell-Turepu =

Cook Island football manager

Personal information
- Place of birth: Cook Islands

Managerial career
- Years: Team
- 2011: Cook Islands (caretaker)
- 2025–: Tupapa Maraerenga F.C. (assistant)

Paul Farrell-Turepu is a Cook Island professional football manager.

== Career ==
In November 2011 Farrell-Turpen was appointed caretaker coach of the Cook Islands national football team.
