= Chris Jackson (New Zealand footballer) =

New Zealand footballer (born 1970)

Personal information
- Full name: Chris Jackson
- Date of birth: 18 July 1970 (age 56)
- Place of birth: Napier, New Zealand
- Height: 1.77 m (5 ft 9 1/2 in)
- Position: Midfielder

Team information
- Current team: Dapto Dandaloo Fury FC

Youth career
- 1983–1986: Napier City Rovers

Senior career*
Years	Team	Apps	(Gls)
1986–1992	Napier City Rovers	120	(17)
1992	Melbourne Croatia	16	(2)
1993–1994	Fawkner Azzurri	38	(7)
1995	Napier City Rovers		
1996–1997	Miramar Rangers	21	(7)
1997	Tampines Rovers FC	18	(5)
1998	Gombak United FC	6	(2)
1999	Napier City Rovers		
1999–2004	The Football Kingz	99	(1)
2004–2006	Waitakere United		(4)
2007–2010	Dandaloo FC	141	(31)
2010–2014	Dapto Dandaloo Fury		

International career^{‡}
1990–2003	New Zealand	60	(10)
Medal record
Representing New Zealand
Men's Association football
OFC Nations Cup
Winner	1998 Australia
Winner	2002 New Zealand
Runner-up	2000 Tahiti
- * Club domestic league appearances and goals ‡ National team caps and goals as of 14 February 2008

Chris Jackson (born 18 July 1970) is a former association football player who represented New Zealand. He last played for Dapto Dandaloo Fury FC.

== Club career ==
Jackson was born in Napier, and began his senior career with Napier City Rovers, the team he joined while still a student at Napier Boys' High School. He subsequently moved to Australia to join Melbourne Knights in the National Soccer League in 1992. Jackson joined the Football Kingz when the New Zealand franchise were accepted into the A-League in 1999 captaining the first ever professional game in New Zealand soccer history.

== International career ==
Jackson made his full All Whites debut in the Kings Cup Thailand in January 1990 against North Korea. He was included in the New Zealand side for the 1999 Confederations Cup finals tournament and again when New Zealand qualified for the 2003 Confederations Cup. Jackson ended his international having played 72 times and scored 12 goals for New Zealand, including 60 A-international caps in which he scored 10 times. He captained the All Whites 10 times. His final international appearance was as a substitute in a 0–5 loss to France on 22 June 2003 as New Zealand bowed out of the Confederations Cup in the group stages.

== Career statistics ==
=== International ===
Appearances and goals by national team and year
National team	Year	Apps	Goals
New Zealand	1992	1	0
New Zealand	1995	9	2
New Zealand	1996	6	0
New Zealand	1997	6	1
New Zealand	1998	4	0
New Zealand	1999	10	3
New Zealand	2000	8	1
New Zealand	2001	7	3
New Zealand	2002	6	0
New Zealand	2003	3	0
Total		60	10

Scores and results list New Zealand's goal tally first, score column indicates score after each Jackson goal.

List of international goals scored by Chris Jackson
No.	Date	Venue	Opponent	Score	Result	Competition	Ref.
1	22 June 1995	Estadio Nacional, Santiago, Chile	Paraguay	2–3	2–3	Friendly	
2	28 June 1995	Estadio Atilio Paiva Olivera, Rivera, Uruguay	Uruguay	2–2	2–2	Friendly	
3	7 June 1997	Govind Park, Ba, Fiji	Fiji	1–0	1–0	1998 FIFA World Cup qualification	
4	16 June 1996	Rajamangala Stadium, Bangkok, Thailand	Thailand	1–0	2–2	Friendly	
5	16 June 1996	Rajamangala Stadium, Bangkok, Thailand	Thailand	2–2	2–2	Friendly	
6	1 July 1999	Shah Alam Stadium, Shah Alam, Malaysia	Malaysia	1–2	1–2	Friendly	
7	19 June 2000	Stade Pater, Papeete, Tahiti	Tahiti	2–0	2–0	2000 OFC Nations Cup	
8	11 June 2001	North Harbour Stadium, North Shore, New Zealand	Solomon Islands	2–0	5–1	2002 FIFA World Cup qualification	
9	11 June 2001	North Harbour Stadium, North Shore, New Zealand	Solomon Islands	4–0	5–1	2002 FIFA World Cup qualification	
10	13 June 2001	North Harbour Stadium, North Shore, New Zealand	Vanuatu	3–0	7–0	2002 FIFA World Cup qualification	

== Honours ==
=== Player ===
New Zealand

- OFC Nations Cup: 1998, 2002; Runner-up, 2000

=== Individual ===
- New Zealand Player of the Year:1992 and 1995
- New Zealand Young Player of the Year: 1988
- 2010 Illawarra player of the year
