= 1967–68 Blackpool F.C. season =

English football club season

Blackpool F.C.
1967–68 season
- Manager: Stan Mortensen
- Division Two: 3rd
- FA Cup: Fourth round
- League Cup: Third round
- Top goalscorer: League: Gerry Ingram & Alan Skirton (17); All: Alan Skirton (18)
Home colours

The 1967–68 season was Blackpool F.C.'s 60th season (57th consecutive) in the Football League. They competed in the 22-team Division Two, then the second tier of English football, finishing third on goal-average.

Blackpool made it past the third round of the FA Cup for the first time in nine seasons. They had entered the competition at the third-round stage for each of those seasons.

Alan Skirton was the club's top scorer, with eighteen goals (seventeen in the league and one in the FA Cup). He and Gerry Ingram shared the accolade in the league, with seventeen goals apiece.

== Table ==
Pos	Team	Pld	W	D	L	GF	GA	GAv	Pts	Qualification or relegation
1	Ipswich Town (C, P)	42	22	15	5	79	44	1.795	59	Promotion to the First Division
2	Queens Park Rangers (P)	42	25	8	9	67	36	1.861	58	Promotion to the First Division
3	Blackpool	42	24	10	8	71	43	1.651	58	
4	Birmingham City	42	19	14	9	83	51	1.627	52	
5	Portsmouth	42	18	13	11	68	55	1.236	49	

Rules for classification: 1) Points; 2) Goal average; 3) Goals scored
(C) Champions; (P) Promoted
