= Drew Sherman =

Welsh football manager (born 1987)

Personal information
- Full name: Drew Cameron Sherman
- Date of birth: 19 June 1987 (age 39)
- Place of birth: Cardiff, Wales

Youth career
- Swansea City

Senior career*
Years	Team	Apps	(Gls)
2006	Bryntirion Athletic		
2006–07	Cwmbrân Town		
- Afan Lido
2008	Shepshed Dynamo		
- Dinas Powys
2009–10	Airbus		

Managerial career
- 2015–2017: Cook Islands
- 2017–2019: Brisbane Roar (Technical Director)
- 2018–2019: Brisbane Roar Youth
- 2019–: Melbourne Victory (General Manager)
- * Club domestic league appearances and goals

Drew Sherman is a Welsh professional football manager who is the technical director of Melbourne Victory. He was previously the technical director of the Brisbane Roar, in addition to being the Cook Islands national team's most successful manager.

== Managerial career ==
Sherman previously coached at Southampton where he worked within the successful academy programme. In 2011, he became the youngest academy manager in the Football League taking the reins of Aldershot Town's academy. He has also been academy manager at Crawley Town.

Sherman holds the UEFA Pro and A Licences, passing his A Licence at the age of 21 through the Football Association of Wales in 2009. He is the son of (Australian) technical director Rob Sherman.

In March 2015, Sherman was appointed as manager, and technical director, of the Cook Islands national team. During his tenure with the Cook Islands, Sherman led the national team to their highest FIFA ranking position following the nation's first competitive victories.

In January 2017, Sherman was appointed as technical director of Brisbane Roar's newly formed academy. Between March and May 2017 he was placed as interim assistant manager to John Aloisi following the suspension of Ross Aloisi.

On 25 May 2019, Sherman was appointed by Melbourne Victory as general manager – technical & academy; in this role, he will be charged with overseeing the Victory's talent development pathway and youth teams, including the structure and ongoing rollout of the club's academy.

== Managerial statistics ==
As of match played 14 June 2015.

Team	From	To	Record				
Team	From	To	G	W	D	L	Win %
Cook Islands	27 March 2015	11 February 2017	3	2	0	1	66.67
Brisbane Roar Youth	4 June 2018	7 March 2019	20	12	4	4	60.00
Total			23	14	4	5	60.87

== Honours ==
Brisbane Roar

- National Youth League: 2018–19
