= Gideon Omokirio =

Solomon Islands footballer (born 1976)

Giggs Omokirio
Personal information
- Full name: Gideon Omokirio
- Date of birth: 12 October 1976 (age 50)
- Place of birth: Honiara, Solomon Islands
- Height: 1.74 m (5 ft 8 1/2 in)
- Position: Defender

Team information
- Current team: PRK Hekari United
- Number: 2

Senior career*
| Years | Team | Apps | (Gls) |
| 1996–2002 | Laugu FC | | |
| 1997 | → Nelson Suburbs (loan) | | |
| 2003–2004 | Kossa FC | | |
| 2005–2006 | Fairwest | | |
| 2007–2009 | Kossa FC | | |
| 2009–? | PRK Hekari United | | |

International career
| 1996–2007 | Solomon Islands | 30 | (4) |
| 2006–2009 | Solomon Islands Beach | 11 | (5) |

Managerial career
- 2019–: FC Isabel United
Medal record
Men's football
Representing Solomon Islands
OFC Nations Cup
| Runner-up | 2004 Australia |
| Third place | 2000 Tahiti |
Athletics
Representing Solomon Islands
Oceania Youth Championships
| Silver medal – second place | 1993 Canberra | High jump |
- * Club domestic league appearances and goals as of 17 July 2010

Gideon Omokirio (born 12 October 1976 in Honiara) is a Solomon Islands footballer who is the current Coach of Isabel Frigates in the current ongoing Solomon Cup 2020.

His brother Eddie was also active in football.

== Club career ==
Giggs Omokirio had played most of his club football in his home country, only for a short spell in New Zealand. He then joined Papua New Guinea side Hekari in 2009.

In May 2010, he won the Oceania Champions League with Hekari United.

== International career ==
Omokirio made his debut for the Solomon Islands in a May 1996 OFC Nations Cup match against Tahiti and has represented his country in every age group at international level including representing his country at the 2006, 2007 and 2008 Beach Soccer World Cups. He has skippered the national team on several occasions.

He played in 17 World Cup qualification games from 1996 through 2007.

=== International Goals ===
Scores and results list Solomon Islands' goal tally first, score column indicates score after each Omokirio goal.

List of international goals scored by Gideon Omokirio
| No. | Date | Venue | Opponent | Score | Result | Competition | Ref. |
|---|---|---|---|---|---|---|---|
| 1 | 21 June 2000 | Stade Pater, Papeete, Tahiti | Cook Islands | 4–1 | 5–1 | 2000 OFC Nations Cup | |
| 2 | 28 June 2000 | Stade Pater, Papeete, Tahiti | Vanuatu | 2–1 | 2–1 | 2000 OFC Nations Cup | |
| 3 | 12 May 2004 | Lawson Tama Stadium, Honiara, Solomon Islands | Cook Islands | 2–0 | 5–0 | 2006 FIFA World Cup qualification | |
| 4 | 15 May 2004 | Lawson Tama Stadium, Honiara, Solomon Islands | New Caledonia | 1–0 | 2–0 | 2006 FIFA World Cup qualification | |

== Honours ==
Hekari United

- Oceania Champions League: 2009–10

Solomon Islands

- OFC Nations Cup: Runner-up, 2004; 3rd place 2000

== Other sports ==
Omokirio was the national champion in the 200 metres running and the long jump.

== Achievements in other sports ==
| Year | Competition | Venue | Position | Event | Notes |
Representing Solomon Islands
| 1993 | Oceania Youth Championships | Canberra, Australia | 2nd | High jump | 1.75 m |
