= Tony Jamieson =

Former international footballer for the Cook Islands

Personal information
- Full name: Tony Lloyd Jamieson
- Date of birth: 16 March 1974 (age 52)
- Place of birth: Wellington, New Zealand
- Height: 1.82 m (6 ft 0 in)
- Position: Goalkeeper

Youth career
- 1981–2000: North Wellington

Senior career*
Years	Team	Apps	(Gls)
2000–2001	Tupapa Maraerenga	5	
2001–2005	Wellington United	12	
2005–2007	Wairarapa United	1	
2007–2008	Wellington Olympic	4	
2008–2010	Stop Out		
2010–2011	Island Bay United		
2011–2013	Tupapa Maraerenga	9	

International career^{‡}
2000–2011	Cook Islands	22	(0)
- * Club domestic league appearances and goals as of 21 July 2012 ‡ National team caps and goals as of 26 November 2011

Tony Lloyd Jamieson (born 16 March 1974) is a former international footballer for the Cook Islands, having played in four FIFA World Cup qualifying campaigns.

== Playing career ==
=== Club ===
Jamieson started his career as a junior player in Wellington, New Zealand, playing for North Wellington AFC in 1981, aged seven.

==== Nikao Sokkattack and Rarotonga F.C. ====
At the age of 26 he became a player for the Cook Islands, his mother's birth country. He played in the Cooks for one-year and coached Tupapa Maraerenga F.C. before returning to Wellington to play for Wellington Diamond United.

==== North Wellington Diamond United ====
He played there for five years, until the age of 31.

==== Nadi FC ====
In 2005, he joined Nadi F.C. in the Inter-district Cup Tournament (IDC).

He received man of the match awards in the two biggest internationals of his career: against Australia in 2000 and against New Zealand in 2004. Cook Islands lost 17–0 and 2–0, respectively.

=== International ===
Jamieson made his international debut for the Cook Islands in 2000. In 2010, Jamieson became infamous after sitting with the ball for over minute during a 2–0 defeat to Fiji.

== Managerial career ==
In November 2011, Jamieson was appointed as technical director of the Cook Islands Football Association. In 2013 he formed Football Cook Islands, a group of passionate, long-term football supporters, players, qualified coaches and club officials, concerned about the way football is currently being managed by the national association CIFA. He was subsequently suspended by CIFA and banned from all football-related activities by the Oceania Football Confederation for five years for ethical breaches.

== Career statistics ==
=== International ===
Cook Islands
Year	Apps	Goals
2000	4	0
2001	4	0
2002	0	0
2003	0	0
2004	4	0
2005	0	0
2006	0	0
2007	4	0
2008	0	0
2009	0	0
2010	0	0
2011	6	0
Total	22	0

Statistics accurate as of match played 26 November 2011
