= Ngatuaine Mani =

Cook Islands footballer

Personal information
- Full name: Ngatuaine Mani
- Date of birth: 5 March 1982 (age 44)
- Place of birth: Cook Islands
- Position: Defender

Team information
- Current team: Avatiu

Senior career*
Years	Team	Apps	(Gls)
2000–	Avatiu		

International career^{‡}
2000–	Cook Islands	6	(0)
- * Club domestic league appearances and goals as of 31 July 2013 ‡ National team caps and goals as of 31 July 2013

Ngatuaine Mani (born 5 March 1982) in the Cook Islands is a footballer who plays as a defender. He currently plays for Avatiu in the Cook Islands Round Cup and the Cook Islands national football team.
