= Edward Drollett =

Cook Islands footballer

Edward Drollet
Personal information
- Full name: Edward Drollet
- Date of birth: 7 June 1975 (age 51)
- Place of birth: Cook Islands
- Position: Midfielder

Senior career*
Years	Team	Apps	(Gls)
1995–2007	Tupapa Maraerenga		

International career^{‡}
1996–2007	Cook Islands	9	(1)
- * Club domestic league appearances and goals as of 18 March 2022 ‡ National team caps and goals as of 18 March 2022

Edward Drollet (born 7 June 1975) in the Cook Islands is a footballer who plays as a midfielder. He currently plays for Tupapa Maraerenga in the Cook Islands Round Cup and the Cook Islands national football team.

Drollett unsuccessfully ran for parliament as a Democratic Party candidate in the Tupapa–Maraerenga electorate at the 2026 general election.
