= John Pareanga (footballer) =

Cook Islands footballer

- Born: 2 October 1980 (age 46)

Domestic
| Years | League | Role |

International
| Years | League | Role |

John Pareanga
Personal information
- Full name: John Pareanga
- Date of birth: 2 October 1980 (age 46)
- Place of birth: Cook Islands
- Position: Defender

Senior career*
| Years | Team | Apps | (Gls) |
| 1997–2012 | Matavera | | |

International career^{‡}
| 1998–2011 | Cook Islands | 20 | (2) |
- * Club domestic league appearances and goals as of 24 May 2018 ‡ National team caps and goals as of 24 May 2018

John Pareanga (born 2 October 1980) is a Cook Islands referee and former footballer who played as a defender for Matavera in the Cook Islands Round Cup and the Cook Islands national football team.

He is the second most capped player for the Cook Islands.
