= Stephen Laybutt =

Australian soccer player (1977–2024)

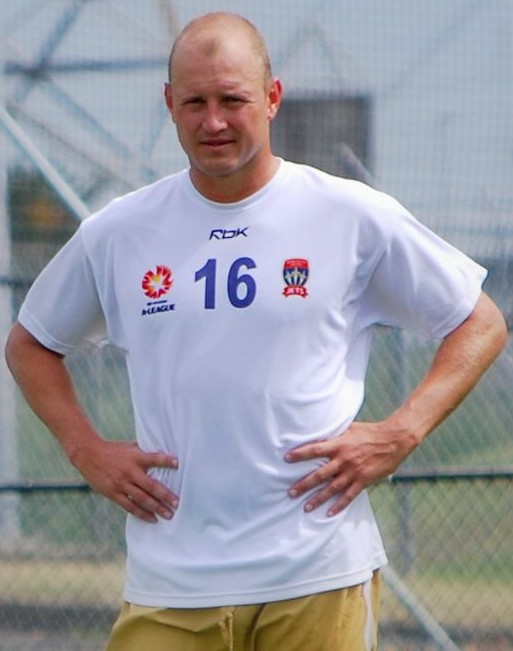
- Laybutt training with the Newcastle Jets

Personal information
- Full name: Stephen John Laybutt
- Date of birth: 3 September 1977
- Place of birth: Lithgow, New South Wales, Australia
- Date of death: 13 January 2024 (aged 46)
- Place of death: Cabarita Beach, New South Wales, Australia
- Height: 1.89 m (6 ft 2 in)
- Position: Defender

Youth career
- 1994–1995: AIS

Senior career*
Years	Team	Apps	(Gls)
1995–1997	Wollongong Wolves	29	(2)
1997–1999	Brisbane Strikers	68	(6)
1999	Bellmare Hiratsuka	10	(0)
1999–2000	Parramatta Power	7	(1)
2000–2002	Feyenoord	0	(0)
2000–2001	→ RBC Roosendaal (loan)	3	(0)
2001	→ Lyn Oslo (loan)	6	(0)
2002	Sydney Olympic	12	(1)
2002–2003	Brisbane Strikers	22	(1)
2003–2004	Excelsior Mouscron	30	(1)
2004–2007	Gent	70	(1)
2007–2008	Newcastle Jets	10	(0)
2009–2010	Dandaloo FC		

International career
1998–2000	Australia U23	14	(1)
2000–2004	Australia	15	(1)
Medal record
Men's association football
Representing Australia
OFC Nations Cup
Winner	2000 Tahiti
Winner	2004 Australia
AFC–OFC Challenge Cup
Runner-up	2001 Japan
- * Club domestic league appearances and goals

Stephen John Laybutt (3 September 1977 – 13 January 2024) was an Australian professional soccer player who played as a defender. Laybutt came out as gay in 2021 and died by suicide in January 2024.

== Early life and career ==
Laybutt was born in Lithgow and played youth football at the Australian Institute of Sport before starting his senior career with Wollongong City in 1995. As well as playing for a number of clubs in the National Soccer League and Newcastle Jets in the A-League, Laybutt played professionally in Japan, the Netherlands, Norway and Belgium. He retired from professional football in 2008.

He won fifteen caps with the Australian national team. He was also a member of the Australian under-23 team at the 2000 Olympics in Sydney.

Laybutt was released by Dutch side Feyenoord in January 2002 to return to Australia, following a loan spell at Lyn Oslo, due to a lack of first team opportunities.

In January 2008, Laybutt suffered an achilles tendon rupture, ruling him out for the remainder of the 2008–09 A-League.

== Personal life and death ==
Following his playing career, Laybutt came out as gay. As of 2021, he worked in the rehab unit at St Vincent's Hospital in Sydney. There, he met patient Ian Pavey, to whom he donated a kidney.

Laybutt was reported missing on 13 January 2024 when he could not be contacted after having last been seen the previous night. He was recorded on security camera footage at 11:30 AM on the 13th. Police discovered Laybutt's body on 14 January 2024 in bushland near Cabarita Beach, New South Wales at age 46, determined to be self-inflicted.

== Honours ==
Sydney Olympic

- NSL Championship: 2001-02

Newcastle Jets

- A-League Championship: 2007–08

Australia

- OFC Nations Cup: 2000, 2004
- AFC–OFC Challenge Cup: runner-up 2001
