= 2026 FIFA World Cup qualification (OFC) =

Association football competition

Tournament details
- Dates: 6 September 2024 – 24 March 2025
- Teams: 11 (from 1 confederation)

Tournament statistics
- Matches played: 18
- Goals scored: 73 (4.06 per match)
- Attendance: 77,489 (4,305 per match)
- Top scorer: (New Zealand) Chris Wood (9 goals)

The Oceanian section of the 2026 FIFA World Cup qualification process took place from 6 September 2024 to 24 March 2025. The 2026 tournament was the 16th edition of Oceanian qualifiers and marked the first time Oceania Football Confederation (OFC) had a direct qualification slot into the FIFA World Cup.

On 24 March 2025, the Oceanian confederation qualification ended with New Zealand qualifying directly to the 2026 FIFA World Cup, and New Caledonia qualifying for the inter-continental play-offs.

== Format ==
The qualification structure was as follows:

- First round: The four lowest-ranked teams in the FIFA Men's World Rankings played a three-match knockout round in September 2024. The winner advanced to the second round.
- Second round: The winning team from the first round joined the seven highest-ranked teams in two four-team groups in October and November 2024. The top two teams from each group advanced to the third round.
- Third round: The four teams advancing from the second round played a three-match knockout round in March 2025 with the winner qualifying for the 2026 World Cup and the runner-up advancing to the inter-confederation play-offs.

== Entrants ==
All eleven eligible OFC nations entered qualification.

- American Samoa
- Cook Islands
- Fiji
- New Caledonia
- New Zealand
- Papua New Guinea
- Samoa
- Solomon Islands
- Tahiti
- Tonga
- Vanuatu

== Schedule ==
The schedule of the competition was as follows.

Round	Matchday	Date	Venue(s)
First round	Matchday 1	6 September 2024	Samoa
First round	Matchday 2	9 September 2024	Samoa
Second round	Matchday 3	10–12 October 2024	Fiji and Vanuatu
Second round	Matchday 4	14–15 November 2024	New Zealand and Papua New Guinea
Second round	Matchday 5	17–18 November 2024	New Zealand and Papua New Guinea
Third round	Semi-finals	21 March 2025	New Zealand
Third round	Final	24 March 2025	New Zealand

== Draw ==
The draw for the first two rounds was held at FIFA headquarters in Switzerland on 18 July from 9:00 CEST (UTC+2). Although announced prior to their official release, the seeding for the draw was based on the FIFA Men's World Rankings of 18 July 2024 (shown in parentheses below).

For the first round, the four lowest-ranked teams competed in a single-elimination play-off to determine which team advanced to the second round. The highest-ranked team faced the lowest-ranked team and the second-ranked team faced the third-ranked team in the semi-finals, and the winners of those matches faced each other in the final.

For the second round, each group contained one team from Pot 1, two from Pot 2 and one from Pot 3 (which also included a placeholder for the first round winner).

From the July 2024 FIFA World Rankings
Bye to second round			Competing in first round
Pot 1	Pot 2	Pot 3	Competing in first round
1. **New Zealand** (94); 2. Solomon Islands (141)	3. **Fiji** (153); 4. **Tahiti** (158); 5. **New Caledonia** (160); 6. Vanuatu (162)	7. Papua New Guinea (168); 8. First round winner (Note: The first round winner was not known at the time of the draw.)	8. Cook Islands (186); 9. American Samoa (187); 10. Samoa (192); 11. Tonga (200)

Note: Teams in bold qualified for the third round. Teams in italics competed only in the first round.

== First round ==
First round matches were played 6–9 September 2024 in Samoa. The four lowest-ranked teams competed in a knockout series, and the winner advanced to join the seven highest-ranked teams in the second round.

=== Bracket ===
Matchday 1
6 September 2024 – Apia
Cook Islands	1
Tonga	3
6 September 2024 – Apia
American Samoa	0
Samoa	2

Matchday 2 (final)
9 September 2024 – Apia
Tonga	1
Samoa (a.e.t.)	2

=== Matchday 1 ===
6 September 2024
11:00 UTC+13

Cook Islands	1–3	Tonga
Kumsuz 63'	FIFA; OFC	Tikoipau 27'; Polovili 39' (pen.); Kefu 79'

FFS Football Stadium Field 1, Apia, Samoa
Attendance: 300
Referee: Calvin Berg (New Zealand)

6 September 2024
15:00 UTC+13

American Samoa	0–2	Samoa
	FIFA; OFC	Tumua 59' (pen.); Vaai 90+8'

FFS Football Stadium Field 1, Apia, Samoa
Attendance: 600
Referee: Norbert Hauata (Tahiti)

=== Matchday 2 ===
The winner advanced to the second round.

9 September 2024
15:00 UTC+13

Tonga	1–2 (a.e.t.)	Samoa
Sonasi 45+1'	FIFA; OFC	Salisbury 82'; Faamatau 105+3'

FFS Football Stadium Field 1, Apia, Samoa
Attendance: 500
Referee: Mederic Lacour (New Caledonia)

== Second round ==
The second round took place from 10 October to 18 November 2024 with two groups of four teams playing each other once in a league format. Matches were played in Fiji, New Zealand, Papua New Guinea, and Vanuatu.

=== Group A ===
Pos	Team	Pld	W	D	L	GF	GA	GD	Pts	Qualification	(New Caledonia)	(Fiji)	(Solomon Islands)	(Papua New Guinea)
1	New Caledonia	3	2	1	0	7	4	+3	7	Advance to the third round	—	—	—	3–1
2	Fiji	3	1	2	0	5	4	+1	5	Advance to the third round	1–1	—	—	—
3	Solomon Islands	3	1	0	2	4	5	−1	3		2–3	0–1	—	—
4	Papua New Guinea	3	0	1	2	5	8	−3	1		—	3–3	1–2	—

Source: OFC
Rules for classification: Tiebreakers
10 October 2024
16:00 UTC+12

New Caledonia	3–1	Papua New Guinea
Athale 20' (pen.); Gope-Fenepej 45'; Haewegene 83'	FIFA; OFC	Semmy 78'

HFC Bank Stadium, Suva, Fiji
Attendance: 1,000
Referee: Campbell-Kirk Waugh (New Zealand)
10 October 2024
19:00 UTC+12

Solomon Islands	0–1	Fiji
	FIFA; OFC	Krishna 13'

HFC Bank Stadium, Suva, Fiji
Attendance: 2,000
Referee: Norbert Hauata (Tahiti)

14 November 2024
13:00 UTC+10

Solomon Islands	2–3	New Caledonia
Lea'i 9'; J. Alick 39'	FIFA; OFC	Athale 6' (pen.), 59' (pen.); Waia 69'

PNG Football Stadium, Port Moresby, Papua New Guinea
Attendance: 1,000
Referee: Calvin Berg (New Zealand)
14 November 2024
16:00 UTC+10

Papua New Guinea	3–3	Fiji
Joe 2'; Kepo 45'; Gunemba 90+4'	FIFA; OFC	Dunn 42'; Krishna 54' (pen.); Nand 90+5'

PNG Football Stadium, Port Moresby, Papua New Guinea
Attendance: 1,428
Referee: Matthew Conger (New Zealand)

17 November 2024
13:00 UTC+10

Fiji	1–1	New Caledonia
Krishna 45+4' (pen.)	FIFA; OFC	Katrawa 59'

PNG Football Stadium, Port Moresby, Papua New Guinea
Attendance: 877
Referee: Norbert Hauata (Tahiti)
17 November 2024
16:00 UTC+10

Papua New Guinea	1–2	Solomon Islands
Semmy 90+2'	FIFA; OFC	David 41'; Lea'alafa 68'

PNG Football Stadium, Port Moresby, Papua New Guinea
Attendance: 1,284
Referee: Campbell-Kirk Waugh (New Zealand)

=== Group B ===
Pos	Team	Pld	W	D	L	GF	GA	GD	Pts	Qualification	(New Zealand)	(French Polynesia)	(Vanuatu)	(Samoa)
1	New Zealand	3	3	0	0	19	1	+18	9	Advance to the third round	—	3–0	8–1	—
2	Tahiti	3	2	0	1	5	3	+2	6	Advance to the third round	—	—	2–0	—
3	Vanuatu	3	1	0	2	5	11	−6	3		—	—	—	4–1
4	Samoa	3	0	0	3	1	15	−14	0		0–8	0–3	—	—

Source: OFC
Rules for classification: Tiebreakers
11 October 2024
13:00 UTC+11

New Zealand	3–0	Tahiti
Just 2'; Wood 67'; Waine 89'	FIFA; OFC

VFF Freshwater Stadium, Port Vila, Vanuatu
Attendance: 1,000
Referee: Médéric Lacour (New Caledonia)
12 October 2024
14:00 UTC+11

Vanuatu	4–1	Samoa
Cooper 7'; Alick 36', 57'; Kalo 90+1'	FIFA; OFC	Viliamu 55'

VFF Freshwater Stadium, Port Vila, Vanuatu
Attendance: 3,000
Referee: Ben Aukwai (Solomon Islands)

15 November 2024
16:00 UTC+13

Samoa	0–3	Tahiti
	FIFA; OFC	Kaspard 59'; Mathon 65'; T. Tehau 87'

Waikato Stadium, Hamilton, New Zealand
Attendance: 638
Referee: Kavitesh Behari (Fiji)
15 November 2024
19:30 UTC+13

New Zealand	8–1	Vanuatu
Garbett 11'; Wood 23', 24'; Bindon 32'; Kaltak 38' (o.g.); Just 74'; Singh 82'; McCowatt 89'	FIFA; OFC	Tasip 17'

Waikato Stadium, Hamilton, New Zealand
Attendance: 10,113
Referee: Ben Aukwai (Solomon Islands)

18 November 2024
16:00 UTC+13

Tahiti	2–0	Vanuatu
Spokeyjack 8' (o.g.); Mathon 67' (pen.)	FIFA; OFC

Mount Smart Stadium, Auckland, New Zealand
Attendance: 395
Referee: Médéric Lacour (New Caledonia)
18 November 2024
19:30 UTC+13

Samoa	0–8	New Zealand
	FIFA; OFC	McCowatt 24'; Wood 28', 34', 60'; Stamenić 62'; De Vries 75'; Just 87'; Waine 90+2' (pen.)

Mount Smart Stadium, Auckland, New Zealand
Attendance: 5,327
Referee: Veer Singh (Fiji)

== Third round ==
The third round took place in New Zealand on 21 and 24 March 2025. The winner qualified for the 2026 FIFA World Cup and the runner-up advanced to the inter-confederation play-offs.

=== Bracket ===
Semi-finals
21 March 2025 – Wellington
New Caledonia	3
Tahiti	0
21 March 2025 – Wellington
New Zealand	7
Fiji	0

Final
24 March 2025 – Auckland
New Caledonia	0
New Zealand	3

=== Semi-finals ===
21 March 2025
15:10 UTC+13

New Caledonia	3–0	Tahiti
Gope-Fenepej 50', 76'; Waya 90+1'	FIFA; OFC

Sky Stadium, Wellington, New Zealand
Attendance: 1,948
Referee: CK Kawana-Waugh (New Zealand)

21 March 2025
19:10 UTC+13

New Zealand	7–0	Fiji
Wood 6', 56', 60'; Singh 16'; Bindon 23'; Payne 32'; Barbarouses 73'	FIFA; OFC

Sky Stadium, Wellington, New Zealand
Attendance: 20,947
Referee: Norbert Hauata (Tahiti)

=== Final ===
The winner qualified for the 2026 FIFA World Cup. The loser advanced to the inter-confederation play-offs.

24 March 2025
19:10 UTC+13

New Caledonia	0–3	New Zealand
	FIFA; OFC	Boxall 61'; Barbarouses 66'; Just 80'

Eden Park, Auckland, New Zealand
Attendance: 25,132
Referee: Ben Aukwai (Solomon Islands)

== Inter-confederation play-offs ==
The runner-up from the third round, New Caledonia, joined Bolivia (from CONMEBOL), DR Congo (from CAF), Iraq (from AFC), Jamaica and Suriname (both from CONCACAF) in the inter-confederation play-offs.

The teams were ranked according to the November 2025 FIFA Men's World Ranking, with the four lowest-ranked teams playing in two single-elimination matches. The winners met the two highest-ranked teams in another set of single-elimination matches, with the winners of these matches qualifying for the 2026 FIFA World Cup.

Semi-final
26 March 2026 – Zapopan
New Caledonia	0
Jamaica	1

Final
31 March 2026 – Zapopan
DR Congo (a.e.t.)	1
Jamaica	0

== Qualified teams ==
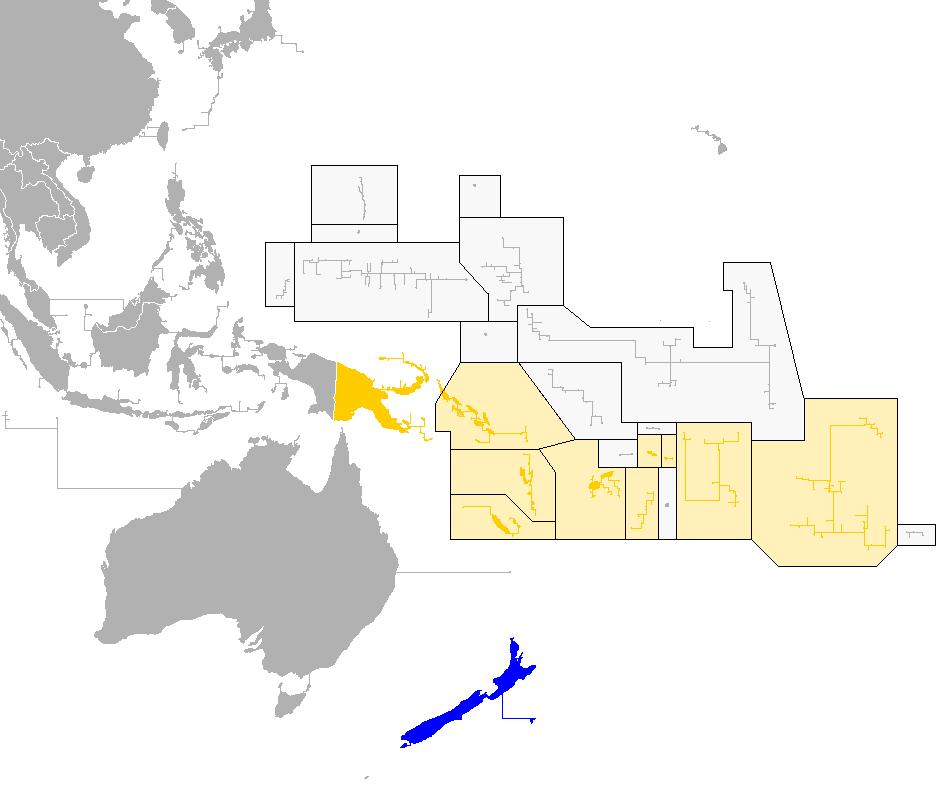
Qualified for the World Cup Failed to qualify Not an OFC member

The following teams from OFC qualified for the final tournament.

Team	Qualified as	Qualified on	Previous appearances in FIFA World Cup
New Zealand	Third round winners	24 March 2025	2 (1982, 2010)

== Goalscorers ==
There were 73 goals scored in 18 matches, for an average of 4.06 goals per match.

9 goals

- (New Zealand men's national football team) Chris Wood

4 goals

- (New Zealand men's national football team) Elijah Just

3 goals

- (Fiji national football team) Roy Krishna
- (New Caledonia national football team) Joseph Athale
- (New Caledonia national football team) Georges Gope-Fenepej

2 goals

- (New Zealand men's national football team) Kosta Barbarouses
- (New Zealand men's national football team) Tyler Bindon
- (New Zealand men's national football team) Callum McCowatt
- (New Zealand men's national football team) Sarpreet Singh
- (New Zealand men's national football team) Ben Waine
- (Papua New Guinea national soccer team) Tommy Semmy
- (Tahiti national football team) Benoit Mathon
- (Vanuatu national football team) John Alick

1 goal

- (Cook Islands men's national football team) Taci Kumsuz
- (Fiji national football team) Thomas Dunn
- (Fiji national football team) Merrill Nand
- (New Caledonia national football team) Germain Haewegene
- (New Caledonia national football team) Jean-Jacques Katrawa
- (New Caledonia national football team) Gérard Waia
- (New Caledonia national football team) Lues Waya
- (New Zealand men's national football team) Michael Boxall
- (New Zealand men's national football team) Francis de Vries
- (New Zealand men's national football team) Matthew Garbett
- (New Zealand men's national football team) Tim Payne
- (New Zealand men's national football team) Marko Stamenić
- (Papua New Guinea national soccer team) Raymond Gunemba
- (Papua New Guinea national soccer team) Joseph Joe
- (Papua New Guinea national soccer team) Ati Kepo
- (Samoa national football team) Jefferson Faamatau
- (Samoa national football team) Luke Salisbury
- (Samoa national football team) Dilo Tumua
- (Samoa national football team) Jarvis Vaai
- (Samoa national football team) Nathan Viliamu
- (Solomon Islands national football team) Javin Alick
- (Solomon Islands national football team) Junior David
- (Solomon Islands national football team) Micah Lea'alafa
- (Solomon Islands national football team) Raphael Lea'i
- (Tahiti national football team) Eddy Kaspard
- (Tahiti national football team) Teaonui Tehau
- (Tonga national football team) Christopher Kefu
- (Tonga national football team) Hemaloto Polovili
- (Tonga national football team) Ulafala Sonasi
- (Tonga national football team) Viliami Tikoipau
- (Vanuatu national football team) Mitch Cooper
- (Vanuatu national football team) Bong Kalo
- (Vanuatu national football team) Jordy Tasip

1 own goal

- (Vanuatu national football team) Brian Kaltak (against New Zealand)
- (Vanuatu national football team) Johnathan Spokeyjack (against Tahiti)

== Discipline ==
A player was automatically suspended for the next match for the following infractions:

- Receiving a red card (red card suspensions may be extended for serious infractions)
- Receiving two yellow cards in two different matches (yellow card suspensions are carried forward to further qualification rounds, but not the finals or any other future international matches)

The following suspensions were served during qualification:

Team	Player	Infraction(s)	Suspended for match(es)
Fiji	Aporosa Yada	(red card) vs Solomon Islands (10 October 2024)	vs Papua New Guinea (14 November 2024) vs New Caledonia (17 November 2024)
New Caledonia	Morgan Mathelon	(yellow card) vs Papua New Guinea (10 October 2024); (yellow card) vs Tahiti (21 March 2025)	vs New Zealand (24 March 2025)
Samoa	Alton Leiataua	(red card) vs American Samoa (5 September 2024)	vs Tonga (9 September 2024) vs Vanuatu (12 October 2024)
Samoa	Alex Malauulu	(yellow card) vs American Samoa (5 September 2024); (yellow card) vs Tonga (9 September 2024)	vs Vanuatu (12 October 2024)
