= Nikorima Te Miha =

Cook Islands footballer

Personal information
- Full name: Nikorima Te Miha
- Date of birth: 1 January 1980 (age 46)
- Place of birth: Cook Islands
- Position: Forward

Senior career*
Years	Team	Apps	(Gls)
1997–2011	Puaikura		
2012	Tupapa Maraerenga		

International career^{‡}
1998–2011	Cook Islands	11	(1)
- * Club domestic league appearances and goals as of 12 June 2018 ‡ National team caps and goals as of 12 June 2018

Nikorima Te Miha (born 1 January 1980) in Cook Islands is a footballer who plays as a forward. He currently plays for Puaikura in the Cook Islands League and the Cook Islands national football team.
