= 2000 OFC Nations Cup =

Coupe d'Océanie des nations 2000 2000 OFC Aibu te Fenua

Tournament details
- Host country: Tahiti
- Dates: 19–28 June
- Teams: 6 (from 1 confederation)
- Venue: 1 (in 1 host city)

Final positions
- Champions: Australia (3rd title)
- Runners-up: New Zealand
- Third place: Solomon Islands
- Fourth place: Vanuatu

Tournament statistics
- Matches played: 10
- Goals scored: 48 (4.8 per match)
- Attendance: 5,500 (550 per match)
- Top scorer(s): (Australia) Craig Foster (Australia) Clayton Zane (5 goals each)

The 2000 OFC Nations Cup was held in Papeete, Tahiti. The six participating teams were Australia and New Zealand who qualified as of right, the Solomon Islands and Vanuatu who qualified from the Melanesia Cup, the Cook Islands and Tahiti who qualified from the Polynesia Cup. Australia beat New Zealand 2–0 in the final. The Solomon Islands beat Vanuatu 2–1 for third place.

Fiji qualified to this edition but then withdrew due to the 2000 Fijian coup d'état and was replaced by Vanuatu.

== Qualification ==
2000 Melanesia Cup
Pos	Team	Pld	Pts
1	Fiji (C, H)	4	10
2	Solomon Islands	4	7
3	Vanuatu	4	6
4	New Caledonia	4	6
5	Papua New Guinea	4	0

(C) Champions;
(H) Hosts

2000 Polynesia Cup
Pos	Team	Pld	Pts
1	Tahiti (C, H)	4	12
2	Cook Islands	4	9
3	Samoa	4	6
4	Tonga	4	3
5	American Samoa	4	0

(C) Champions;
(H) Hosts

=== Qualified teams ===
Team	Qualified as
Australia	Automatically qualified
New Zealand	Automatically qualified
Solomon Islands	2000 Melanesia Cup runners-up
Vanuatu	2000 Melanesia Cup third place (Note: Fiji withdrew for the 2000 OFC Nations Cup because of political unrest in the country, which led to the 2000 Fijian coup d'état. However, Vanuatu replaced Fiji for the final tournament.)
Tahiti	2000 Polynesia Cup winner
Cook Islands	2000 Polynesia Cup runners-up

== Venue ==
Tahiti
Pirae
Stade Pater Te Hono Nui
Capacity: 11,700

== Squads ==
See 2000 OFC Nations Cup squads.

== Group stage ==
=== Group A ===
Pos	Team	Pld	W	D	L	GF	GA	GD	Pts	Qualification
1	Australia	2	2	0	0	23	0	+23	6	Advance to knockout stage
2	Solomon Islands	2	1	0	1	5	7	−2	3	Advance to knockout stage
3	Cook Islands	2	0	0	2	1	22	−21	0	

19 June 2000

Australia	17–0	Cook Islands
Agostino 18', 53', 68'; Muscat 21', 45' (pen.); Tiatto 24'; Foster 30', 42', 51', 80'; Zdrilic 35', 65'; Popovic 60'; Corica 70'; Zane 82', 87', 89'	Report

Stade Pater, Papeete
Attendance: 1,000
Referee: Ronan Leaustic (Tahiti)

21 June 2000

Solomon Islands	5–1	Cook Islands
Suri 33'; Menapi 47'; Samani 63'; Omokirio 74'; Koto 88'	Report	Shepherd 55'

Stade Pater, Papeete
Attendance: 1,000
Referee: Harry Attison (Vanuatu)

23 June 2000

Australia	6–0	Solomon Islands
Chipperfield 6'; Zane 13', 35'; Omokirio 36' (o.g.); Muscat 39' (pen.); Cardozo 43'	Report

Stade Pater, Papeete
Attendance: 300
Referee: Joakim Sosongan (Papua New Guinea)

=== Group B ===
Pos	Team	Pld	W	D	L	GF	GA	GD	Pts	Qualification
1	New Zealand	2	2	0	0	5	1	+4	6	Advance to knockout stage
2	Vanuatu	2	1	0	1	4	5	−1	3	Advance to knockout stage
3	Tahiti (H)	2	0	0	2	2	5	−3	0	

(H) Hosts
19 Jun 2000

New Zealand	2–0	Tahiti
Bouckenooghe 27'; Jackson 78'

Stade Pater, Papeete
Attendance: 1,000

21 Jun 2000

New Zealand	3–1	Vanuatu
Killen 47', 84'; Perry 56'		Iwai 14'

Stade Pater, Papeete
Attendance: 500

22 Jun 2000

Vanuatu	3–2	Tahiti
Ben 49'; Iwai 60'; Tura 77'		Rousseau 2' (pen.); Amaru 87'

Stade Pater, Papeete
Attendance: 300

== Knockout stage ==
=== Bracket ===
Semi-finals
25 June – Papeete
Australia	1
Vanuatu	0
25 June – Papeete
New Zealand	2
Solomon Islands	0

Final
28 June – Papeete
Australia	2
New Zealand	0
Third place
28 June – Papeete
Vanuatu	1
Solomon Islands	2

=== Semi-finals ===
25 Jun 2000

Australia	1–0	Vanuatu
Muscat 5' (pen.)

Stade Pater, Papeete
Attendance: 300

25 Jun 2000

New Zealand	2–0	Solomon Islands
Elliott 51', 55'

Stade Pater, Papeete
Attendance: 500

=== Third place match ===
28 Jun 2000

Solomon Islands	2–1	Vanuatu
Commins Menapi 53'; Gideon Omokirio 69' (pen.)		Bibi 35'

Stade Pater, Papeete
Attendance: 300

=== Final ===
28 Jun 2000

Australia	2–0	New Zealand
Murphy 40'; Foster 66'

Stade Pater, Papeete
Attendance: 300
Referee: Harry Attison (Vanuatu)

== Goalscorers ==
5 goals

- (Australia) Clayton Zane
- (Australia) Craig Foster

4 goals

- (Australia) Kevin Muscat

2 goals

- (Australia) David Zdrilic
- (Australia) Paul Agostino
- (New Zealand) Chris Killen
- (New Zealand) Simon Elliott
- (Solomon Islands) Commins Menapi
- (Solomon Islands) Gideon Omokirio
- (Vanuatu) Richard Iwai

1 goal

- (Australia) Danny Tiatto
- (Australia) Pablo Cardozo
- (Australia) Scott Chipperfield
- (Australia) Shaun Murphy
- (Australia) Stan Lazaridis
- (Australia) Steve Corica
- (Australia) Tony Popovic
- (Cook Islands) Daniel Shepherd
- (New Zealand) Chris Jackson
- (New Zealand) Jonathan Perry
- (New Zealand) Kris Bouckenooghe
- (Solomon Islands) Batram Suri
- (Solomon Islands) Henry Kotto
- (Solomon Islands) Jack Samani
- (French Polynesia) Harold Amaru
- (French Polynesia) Jean-Loup Rousseau
- (Vanuatu) Georgina Tura
- (Vanuatu) Jimmy Ben
- (Vanuatu) Lexa Bibi

Own goal

- (Solomon Islands) Gideon Omokirio (playing against Australia)
