= Cook Islands national football team =

Cook Islands
- Nickname: Te Kukis (The Cooks)
- Association: Cook Islands Football Association (CIFA)
- Confederation: OFC (Oceania)
- Head coach: Rhys Ruka
- Captain: Kerim Kumsuz
- Most caps: Tony Jamieson (22)
- Top scorer: Taylor Saghabi (7)
- Home stadium: CIFA Field
- FIFA code: COK
First colours	Second colours

FIFA ranking
- Current: 188 ▼1 (18 November 2026)
- Highest: 166 (October 2015)
- Lowest: 207 (April–July 2015)

First international
- Papua New Guinea 16–1 Cook Islands (Papeete, Tahiti; 11 September 1971)

Biggest win
- Cook Islands 3–0 American Samoa (Papeete, Tahiti; 12 June 2000); Cook Islands 4–1 Tuvalu (Apia, Samoa; 1 September 2007); Cook Islands 3–0 Kiribati (Boulari, New Caledonia; 1 September 2011); Tonga 0–3 Cook Islands (Nukuʻalofa, Tonga; 31 August 2015)

Biggest defeat
- Tahiti 30–0 Cook Islands (Papeete, Tahiti; 13 September 1971)

OFC Nations Cup
- Appearances: 2 (first in 1998)
- Best result: Group stage (1998, 2000)

Pacific Games
- Appearances: 5 (first in 1971)
- Best result: Sixth place (1971)

Polynesia Cup
- Appearances: 2 (first in 1998)
- Best result: Runners-up (1998, 2000)

The Cook Islands men's national football team is the men's football team that represents the Cook Islands in international competition since 1971. It is governed by the Cook Islands Football Association which is part of the Oceania Football Confederation (OFC) and FIFA.

The nation has participated in seven FIFA World Cup qualification attempts since their first attempt back in 1998. They have qualified for the OFC Nations Cup twice in 1998 and 2000 OFC Nations Cup with both appearances seeing no wins from their four games that they have played.

They are the 2nd smallest nation in FIFA by population, with only Montserrat being less populated. They are also one of the most isolated members of FIFA, with Rarotonga being situated around 1,000 km from Niue, the nearest nation.

They have sat bottom of the FIFA World Ranking on multiple occasions, and have finished last in FIFA World Cup qualifiers in the 2026 FIFA World Cup, 2014 FIFA World Cup and 1998 FIFA World Cup, making them to date one of the weakest national sides in the world.

They beat rivals Tahiti for the first time on 30 September 2026 in a 3–2 win at home.

== History ==
=== Record defeat, Pacific Games and inactivity (1971–1991) ===
Despite being absent from the first three editions of the South Pacific Games, the geographical proximity of the Cook Islands with French Polynesia, host of the 1971 South Pacific Games, allowed the Cook Islands team to take part in the tournament. In the first round they were defeated 16–1 by Papua New Guinea and 30–0 by Tahiti, while in the match for fifth place, they fell to Fiji 15–1.

=== Foundation and the two OFC Nations Cup (1991–2001) ===
The Cook Islands Football Association was founded in 1991, and was shortly followed by the founding of the Cook Islands Round Cup in 1992 and FIFA membership in 1994.

They next played a match in 1995 when proximity allowed them to participate again in the 1995 South Pacific Games. During the tournament they earned their first win, a 2–1 win over Wallis and Futuna, but lost their other four clashes resoundingly.

The Cook Islands qualified for their first OFC Nations Cup after finishing second in the 1998 Polynesia Cup, which they hosted. They faced Australia and Fiji in Group B, in what proved to be a tough draw. Australia crushed the Cook Islands 16–0 in their first match, scoring eight goals either side of the interval. In their next match against Fiji, however, the Cook Islands acquitted themselves much better, losing only 3–0, but with two defeats from two matches they failed to make the semi-finals.

In finishing 2nd at the 2000 Polynesia Cup, the Cook Islands also qualified for the OFC Nations Cup. They were drawn in Group A along with the Solomon Islands, and again, Australia. After their heavy defeat at the hands of Australia in the previous tournament, the Cook Islands hoped to avoid a repeat performance. However, they were powerless to prevent their opponents from running rampant, this time to the tune of 17–0. The Solomon Islands were up next, and in this game the Cook Islands had the consolation of scoring their first goal at the OFC Nations Cup – the only bright spot in an otherwise bleak 5–1 defeat. After two defeats, then, the Cooks Islands again went out at the group stage.

In 2001 during 2002 FIFA World Cup qualification, the Cook Islands faced New Zealand, the first fixture between the two. The Cook Islands held strong, keeping the opposition level at 0-0 until half time, until substitute Noah Hickey scored a brace to put the efforts of the Cook Islands defence in vein. Goalkeeper Tony Jamieson won player of the match, making at minimum 7 and maximum of 26 saves during the match.

=== Decline and struggles (2002–2025) ===
They next entered qualification for the 2004 tournament, but lost all four matches and failed to progress.

They returned to the South Pacific Games for the 2007 competition, where their only victory was a 4–1 win over Tuvalu. Four years later, at Nouméa 2011, they defeated Kiribati 3–0 but lost their other three matches. In 2012 OFC Nations Cup qualification, they drew with American Samoa and lost to Samoa and Tonga.

In the 2016 OFC Nations Cup qualifiers, they defeated Tonga 3–0 and Samoa 1–0, but lost their final match 2–0 to American Samoa. The Cook Islands finished third in the group, level on points with Samoa and American Samoa but behind both on goal difference.

In March 2022, the Cook Islands played their first match in seven years, losing 2–0 to the Solomon Islands in qualifying for the 2022 FIFA World Cup. They subsequently withdrew from their remaining matches due to a COVID-19 outbreak.

On 28 August 2023, the Cook Islands returned to international football against Tahiti, suffering a 9–1 defeat at the Stade Pater Te Hono Nui in Pirae.

Later that year, they took part in the 2023 Pacific Games, recording their first victory since 2015 with a 2–1 win over Tonga. Tremaine Rimene-Albrett scored a late penalty on his international debut to secure the victory. The Cook Islands then lost 8–0 to New Caledonia before withdrawing from the competition due to flight issues.

In March 2024, the Cook Islands competed in the qualifying tournament for the 2024 OFC Men's Nations Cup. They lost their opening match 1–0 to Samoa, before defeating Tonga 1–0 through a goal from Taylor Saghabi. The Cook Islands finished second in the three-team qualifying group and failed to advance to the final tournament.

Later that year, the Cook Islands returned to FIFA World Cup qualification for the first time since the 2018 World Cup qualifying campaign. In the first round of 2026 FIFA World Cup qualification, they faced Tonga in a single-elimination match. Despite a goal from debutant Tacettin Kumsuz, the Cook Islands lost 3–1. They subsequently lost 2–1 to American Samoa in a friendly placement match, leaving them 11th among the 11 full OFC members.

=== Ruka era (2026–present) ===
In 2026, the Cook Islands Football Association announced a two-match friendly series against Tahiti, which would mark the Cook Islands' first full internationals at home in almost 30 years.

In September 2026, a shock call-up was given to Nikao Sokattak goalkeeper Tearii Scheel aged only 15.

They defeated neighbours and rivals Tahiti for the first time in their history, delivering a shock 3–2 result.

In October 2026, the Tuvalu Islands Football Association invited them to the 2027 Four Nations Cup alongside Kiribati and Tonga.

== Kit sponsorship ==
Kit supplier	Period
(Italy) Lotto	2001
(Germany) Adidas	2002–2007
(Italy) Lotto	2007–2012
(New Zealand) Onu Football	2016–2022
(Australia) KPI Sports	2022–2024
(Italy) Lotto Sport Italia	2024–

== Results and fixtures ==
The following is a list of match results in the last 12 months, as well as any future matches that have been scheduled.

Win Draw Loss Fixture

=== 2026 ===
September 26 Friendly	Cook Islands	1–3	Tahiti	Matavera, Cook Islands
18:00 UTC−10	K. Kumsuz 84'		Tanerii 6', 8'; Maraetefau 62'	Stadium: CIFA Field

September 30 Friendly	Cook Islands	3–2	Tahiti	Matavera, Cook Islands
16:00 UTC−10	Mata 3', 49'; Rimene-Albrett 9'		K.Bennett 16', 23'	Stadium: CIFA Field

November 13 Friendly	Tahiti	4–0	Cook Islands	Faʼaʼā, Tahiti, French Polynesia
18:00 (UTC-10:00)	Degrumelle 25', 53'; Beal 31' (o.g.); Tetauira 36'			Stadium: Stade Louis Ganivet

November 16 Friendly	Tahiti	3–3	Cook Islands	Faʼaʼā, Tahiti, French Polynesia
18:00 (UTC-10:00)	Tetauira 25', 41'; T.Tehau 77'		Webb 19', 67'; Denny 87'	Stadium: Stade Louis Ganivet

=== 2027 ===
January 2027 2027 Four Nations Cup	Cook Islands	v	Tuvalu	Auckland, New Zealand
				Stadium: Ngahue Reserve

January 2027 2027 Four Nations Cup	Cook Islands	v	Tonga	Auckland, New Zealand
				Stadium: Ngahue Reserve

January 2027 2027 Four Nations Cup	Cook Islands	v	Kiribati	Auckland, New Zealand
				Stadium: Ngahue Reserve

== Coaches ==
- (Cook Islands) Alex Napa (1996–1998)
- (Cook Islands) Cormac Gallen-Willcocks (2001–2004)
- (Australia) Tim Jerks (2004–2010)
- (New Zealand) Shane Rufer (2011)
- (Cook Islands) Paul Farrell-Turepu (2011–2014)
- (Wales) Drew Sherman (2015–2017)
- (New Zealand) Kevin Fallon (2018–2020)
- (England) Alan Taylor (2022)
- (New Zealand) Jess Ibrom (2023-2024)
- (Cook Islands) Tuka Tisam (2024-2026)
- (New Zealand) Rhys Ruka (2026-)

== Players ==
=== Current squad ===
The following players were called up for the Tahiti matches in November 2026.

Caps and goals are correct as of 18 November 2026, after the match against Tahiti.

No.	Pos.	Player	Date of birth (age)	Caps	Goals	Club
	GK	Ngereine Maro	20 March 2005 (age 21)	8	0	(New Zealand Football) South Island United
	GK	Emmett Connolly	5 April 2007 (age 19)	2	0	(New Zealand Football) Western Springs
	GK	Tyson Tekeu	11 August 1986 (age 40)	0	0	Unattached
	DF	Nicholas Smith	14 October 2001 (age 25)	2	0	(New Zealand Football) Ferrymead Bays
	DF	Thane Beal	26 March 1997 (age 29)	9	0	(Football Australia) Westvale Olympic
	DF	Shane Tuteru	29 June 2006 (age 20)	2	0	(Cook Islands Football Association) Tupapa Maraerenga
	DF	Dallas Rongokea	13 July 2007 (age 19)	4	0	(New Zealand Football) Wellington Olympic
	DF	Avi Enoka	11 January 2001 (age 25)	4	1	(Cook Islands Football Association) Tupapa Maraerenga
	DF	Tarik Kumsuz		2	0	(Football Australia) Unattached
	MF	Ngametua Tuakana	28 February 2005 (age 21)	5	0	(Cook Islands Football Association) Tupapa Maraerenga
	MF	Maui Denny	21 September 2010 (age 16)	2	1	(New Zealand Football) Mount Albert Grammar School
	MF	Kerim Kumsuz	27 August 1992 (age 34)	4	1	(Football Australia) Auburn
	MF	Taci Kumsuz	6 January 1999 (age 27)	5	1	(Football Australia) University of New South Wales
	MF	Eren Kumsuz		2	0	(Football Australia) Parramatta
	MF	Jeremiah Williams	11 November 2006 (age 20)	1	0	(New Zealand Football) West Coast Rangers
	MF	Kima Webb	30 July 2009 (age 17)	4	2	(New Zealand Football) Mount Albert Grammar School
	MF	Dwayne Tiputoa	8 December 1997 (age 28)	10	1	(Cook Islands Football Association) Puaikura
	FW	Cade Mapu	5 December 1997 (age 28)	3	0	(Football Australia) Central Coast United
	FW	Dalziel Beal	26 April 2005 (age 21)	7	0	(Football Australia) Port Melbourne Sharks
	FW	Tremaine Rimene-Albrett	1 January 2002 (age 24)	8	2	(New Zealand Football) Western Suburbs

== Player records ==
As of 30 September 2026
Players in bold are still active with Cook Islands.

=== Most appearances ===
Rank	Name	Caps	Goals	Career
1	Tony Jamieson	22	0	2000–2011
2	John Pareanga	20	2	1998–2011
3	Taylor Saghabi	19	7	2011–2024
3	**Grover Harmon**	19	1	2009–present
5	Paavo Mustonen	18	0	2007–2024
6	Joseph Chambers	14	0	1996–2004
7	Tahiri Elikana	13	0	2011–2024
7	Mark Jamieson	13	1	2000–2004
7	Christian Tauira	13	0	1998–2004
10	Stenter Mani	12	2	1996–2001
10	Joseph Miitamariki	12	0	2007–2011
10	James Nand	12	0	1996–2001
10	Daniel Shepherd	12	1	2000–2007
10	Nikorima Te Miha	12	2	1998–2011

=== Top goalscorers ===
Rank	Name	Goals	Caps	Ratio	Career
1	Taylor Saghabi	7	19	0.37	2011–2024
2	Joseph Ngauora	3	8	0.38	2009–2011
2	Campbell Best	3	11	0.27	2009–2015
4	**Tremaine Rimene-Albrett**	2	8	0.25	2023–present
4	Teariki Mateariki	2	6	0.33	2004–2007
4	Stenter Mani	2	12	0.17	1996–2001
4	Nikorima Te Miha	2	12	0.17	1998–2011
4	John Pareanga	2	20	0.1	1998–2011
4	**Benjamin Mata**	2	2	1	2022–present
4	**Kima Webb**	2	4	0.5	2026–present

== Competition record ==
=== FIFA World Cup ===
FIFA World Cup									Qualification						
Year	Host	Round	Pld	W	D	L	F	A	Pos.	Pld	W	D	L	F	A
1930 to 1994		Not a FIFA member							Not a FIFA member						
1998	France	Did not qualify							First round	2	0	0	2	1	4
2002	South Korea; Japan	Did not qualify							First round	4	0	0	4	2	25
2006	Germany	Did not qualify							First round	4	0	0	4	1	17
2010	South Africa	Did not qualify							First round	4	1	0	3	4	9
2014	Brazil	Did not qualify							First round	3	0	1	2	4	6
2018	Russia	Did not qualify							First round	3	2	0	1	4	2
2022	Qatar	Withdrew							Withdrew						
2026	Canada; Mexico; United States	Did not qualify							First round	1	0	0	1	1	3
2030	Morocco; Portugal; Spain	To be determined							To be determined						
2034	Saudi Arabia	To be determined							To be determined						
Total		–	–	–	–	–	–	–	0/7	21	3	1	17	17	66

=== OFC Nations Cup ===
Oceania Cup / OFC Nations Cup record										Qualification record					
Year	Round	Position	Pld	W	D	L	GF	GA	Squad	Pld	W	D	L	GF	GA
(New Zealand) 1973	Did not enter									Did not enter					
(New Caledonia) 1980	Did not enter									Did not enter					
(Pacific Community) 1996	Did not enter									Did not enter					
(Australia) 1998	Group stage	6th	2	0	0	2	0	19	Squad	4	2	1	1	8	11
(French Polynesia) 2000	Group stage	6th	2	0	0	2	1	22	Squad	4	3	0	1	8	5
(New Zealand) 2002	Withdrew									Withdrew					
(Australia) 2004	Did not qualify									4	0	0	4	1	17
(Pacific Community) 2008	Did not qualify									4	1	0	3	4	9
(Solomon Islands) 2012	Did not qualify									3	0	1	2	4	6
(Papua New Guinea) 2016	Did not qualify									3	2	0	1	4	2
(Fiji) (Vanuatu) 2024	Did not qualify									2	1	0	1	1	1
Total	Group stage	2/11	4	0	0	4	1	41	—	24	9	2	13	20	51

=== Pacific Games ===
Pacific Games record
Year	Round	Position	Pld	W	D	L	GF	GA
1963 to 1969	did not enter							
(French Polynesia) 1971	Group Stage	6th	3	0	0	3	2	61
1975 to 1991	did not enter							
(French Polynesia) 1995	Group stage	7th	4	1	0	3	2	37
(Fiji) 2003	did not enter							
(Samoa) 2007	Group stage	8th	4	1	0	3	4	9
(New Caledonia) 2011	Group stage	9th	4	1	0	3	4	15
(Papua New Guinea) 2015	N/A – tournament was U23							
(Samoa) 2019	did not enter							
(Solomon Islands) 2023 (Note: The Cook Islands men's national team were withdrew by the federation after the elimination from the group stage citing travelling issues for coming back from Honiara. The team didn't play the 5th place semi-final, nor the 7th place final)	Group stage	8th	2	1	0	1	2	9
Total	Group stage	5/16	17	4	0	13	14	131

=== Polynesia Cup ===
Polynesia Cup record
Year	Round	Position	Pld	W	D	L	GF	GA
(Samoa) 1994	did not enter							
(Cook Islands) 1998	Runners-up	2nd	4	2	1	1	8	11
(French Polynesia) 2000	Runners-up	2nd	4	3	0	1	8	5
Total	2/3	0 Titles	8	5	1	2	16	16

== Head-to-head record ==
Team	Pld	W	D	L	GF	GA	GD	WPCT
American Samoa	5	2	1	2	9	8	+1	40.00
Australia	2	0	0	2	0	33	−33	0.00
Fiji	4	0	0	4	2	26	−24	0.00
Kiribati	1	1	0	0	3	0	+3	100.00
New Caledonia	4	0	0	4	0	28	−28	0.00
New Zealand	1	0	0	1	0	2	−2	0.00
Papua New Guinea	3	0	0	3	1	23	−22	0.00
Samoa (Note: Includes results as Western Samoa.)	8	3	1	4	9	12	−3	37.50
Solomon Islands	5	0	0	5	2	37	−35	0.00
Tahiti	12	1	0	11	5	81	−76	8.33
Tonga	11	5	2	4	16	15	+1	45.45
Tuvalu	1	1	0	0	4	1	+3	100.00
Vanuatu	1	0	0	1	1	8	−7	0.00
Wallis and Futuna	1	1	0	0	2	1	+1	100.00
Total	59	14	4	41	54	275	−221	23.73

Source: Results

== Historical kits ==
1995 Home	1995 Away	2001 Home	2007 Home	2007 Away	2011 Home	2015 Home	2015 Away

2022 Home	2022 Away

== Honours ==
=== Subcontinental ===
- Polynesia Cup
  - (silver) Runners-up (2): 1998, 2000

== See also ==
- Cook Islands national under-20 football team
- Cook Islands national under-17 football team
- Cook Islands women's national football team
- Cook Islands women's national under-17 football team
