= 2001 Australia national soccer team season =

Australia
2001 season
- Manager: Frank Farina

This page summarises the Australia national soccer team fixtures and results in 2001.

== Summary ==
Australia started a busy 2001 with an away friendly in Bogotá, Colombia where they went three goals behind to the hosts before pulling two back late. In April, Australia commenced their qualification for the 2002 FIFA World Cup by hosting a group of five in the OFC qualification First Round at Coffs Harbour. In the first game against Tonga, Australia set a new world record for an international football match when they won 22–0. Just two days later, they broke that record when they won 31–0 against American Samoa. Archie Thompson also set an individual world record by scoring 13 goals in the game. With Australia winning their next two games they comfortably proceeded to the OFC Final Round against New Zealand later in the year.

As champions of the 2000 OFC Nations Cup, Australia headed to South Korea for the 2001 FIFA Confederations Cup. They were drawn in a group with hosts South Korea; 1998 FIFA World Cup and UEFA Euro 2000 winners, France and Mexico, winners of the 1999 FIFA Confederations Cup. Australia beat Mexico in the opening game with a first half goal to Shaun Murphy and another to Josip Skoko in the second half. They then had a surprise victory over France when Clayton Zane scored the only goal of the game. Despite losing the third game 1–0 to South Korea, Australia finished second in the group on goal difference to proceed to the semi-final stage. They had to travel to Yokohama to play against Japan, the joint hosts, and lost the game 1–0. Australia finished off the tournament with another upset victory to claim third-place. This time it was against Brazil when Murphy scored in the 84th minute for a 1–0 victory.

Nine days later Australia were in Wellington for the first leg of the second round of World Cup qualification. Brett Emerton scored a double and despite a late Danny Tiatto red card they held on for a 2–0 win. The second leg was held in front of a crowd of 41,976 at Stadium Australia in Sydney and a 4–1 win gave them a 6–1 aggregate victory and meant Australia would proceed to OFC–CONMEBOL play-off against the fifth placed South American side.

Heading back to Japan for an August friendly saw Australia lose 3–0 and in November they hosted the current world ranked number one nation, France in a friendly at the Melbourne Cricket Ground. Craig Moore gave Australia the lead just prior to half-time however French striker David Trezeguet equalised just after the break and the game finished 1–1.

The year finished up with a two-legged tie to attempt to qualify for the 2002 World Cup. Australia hadn't participated since the 1974 FIFA World Cup and they came up against Uruguay. The first leg was played in Melbourne and a Kevin Muscat penalty in the 78th minute gave Australia a 1–0 lead going into the second leg. On 25 November the second leg was played at Estadio Centenario in Montevideo. An early goal by Darío Silva for Uruguay brought the tie level however a second half brace by Richard Morales gave victory and World Cup qualification to Uruguay.

== Record ==
Type	GP	W	D	L	GF	GA
Friendly matches	3	0	1	2	3	7
Confederations Cup	5	3	0	2	4	2
World Cup qualifiers	8	7	0	1	73	4
Total	16	10	1	5	80	13

== Match results ==
=== Friendlies ===
28 February 2001 Friendly match	Colombia	3–2	Australia	Bogotá, Colombia
	Serna 12'; Salazar 66'; Grisales 75'		77' (pen.) Corica; 90' Chipperfield	Stadium: Nemesio Camacho Stadium; Attendance: 2,071; Referee: (Spain) Henry Cervantes

15 August 2001 Friendly match	Japan	3–0	Australia	Fukuroi, Japan
	Yanagisawa 19'; Hattori 53'; Nakayama 65' (pen.)			Stadium: Shizuoka Stadium; Attendance: 60,000; Referee: (China) Zhang Jianjun

11 November 2001 Friendly match	Australia	1–1	France	Melbourne, Australia
	Moore 43'	Report	49' Trezeguet	Stadium: Melbourne Cricket Ground; Attendance: 53,173; Referee: (Australia) Simon Micallef

=== Confederations Cup ===
30 May 2001 Group match	Mexico	0–2	Australia	Suwon, South Korea
			20' Murphy; 55' Skoko	Stadium: Suwon World Cup Stadium; Attendance: 6,232; Referee: (Zimbabwe) Felix Tangawarima

1 June 2001 Group match	Australia	1–0	France	Daegu, South Korea
	Zane 89'			Stadium: Daegu World Cup Stadium; Attendance: 44,400; Referee: (Guatemala) Carlos Batres

3 June 2001 Group match	South Korea	1–0	Australia	Suwon, South Korea
	Hwang 24'			Stadium: Suwon World Cup Stadium; Attendance: 42,759; Referee: (Colombia) Oscar Julian Ruiz

7 June 2001 Semi-final	Japan	1–0	Australia	Yokohama, Japan
	Nakata 43'			Stadium: Yokohama International Stadium; Attendance: 48,699; Referee: (Mexico) Benito Archundia

9 June 2001 3rd place	Australia	1–0	Brazil	Ulsan, South Korea
	Murphy 84'			Stadium: Munsu Cup Stadium; Attendance: 28,520; Referee: (Germany) Hellmut Krug

=== World Cup qualifiers ===
9 April 2001 OFC group match	Tonga	0–22	Australia	Coffs Harbour, Australia
			Chipperfield 3', 83'; Mori 13', 23', 40', 58'; Aloisi 14', 24', 37', 45', 52', 63'; Muscat 18', 30', 54', 82'; Popovic 67'; Vidmar 74'; Zdrilic 78', 90'; Thompson 80'; Boutsianis 87'	Stadium: International Sports Stadium; Attendance: 1,500; Referee: (Vanuatu) Harry Atisson

11 April 2001 OFC group match	Australia	31–0	American Samoa	Coffs Harbour, Australia
	Boutsianis 10', 50', 84'; Thompson 12', 23', 27', 29', 32'; 37', 42', 45', 56', 60'; 65', 85', 88'; Zdrilic 13', 21', 25', 33', 58'; 66', 78', 89'; Vidmar 14', 80'; Popovic 17', 19'; Colosimo 51', 81'; De Amicis 55'			Stadium: International Sports Stadium; Attendance: 3,500; Referee: (French Polynesia) Ronan Leaustic

14 April 2001 OFC group match	Fiji	0–2	Australia	Coffs Harbour, Australia
			Corica 23'; Foxe 81'	Stadium: International Sports Stadium; Attendance: 1,500; Referee: (New Zealand) Derek Rugg

16 April 2001 OFC group match	Australia	11–0	Samoa	Coffs Harbour, Australia
	A. Vidmar 5', 50'; Zdrillic 28', 57'; Foxe 44'; Popovic 55', 89'; Thompson 75', 88'; Chipperfield 76'; Bureta 81' (o.g.)			Stadium: International Sports Stadium; Attendance: 1,500; Referee: (New Zealand) Brian Precious

20 June 2001 OFC final round	New Zealand	0–2	Australia	Wellington, New Zealand
			Emerton 6', 82'	Stadium: Westpac Trust Stadium; Attendance: 19,500; Referee: (Japan) Masayoshi Okada

24 June 2001 OFC final round	Australia	4–1	New Zealand	Sydney, Australia
	Zdrilic 5', 82'; Emerton 40'; Aloisi 56'		Coveny 44' (pen.)	Stadium: Stadium Australia; Attendance: 41,976; Referee: (South Korea) Kwon Jung Chul

20 November 2001 Play-off	Australia	1–0	Uruguay	Melbourne, Australia
	Muscat 79' (pen.)			Stadium: Melbourne Cricket Ground; Attendance: 84,656; Referee: (Italy) Graziano Cesari

25 November 2001 Play-off	Uruguay	3–0	Australia	Montevideo, Uruguay
	Silva 14'; Morales 70', 90'			Stadium: Estadio Centenario; Attendance: 62,000; Referee: (United Arab Emirates) Ali Bujsaim

== Goal scorers ==
Player	Goals
Archie Thompson	16
David Zdrillic	14
John Aloisi	7
Kevin Muscat	5
Tony Popovic	5
Con Boutsianis	4
Scott Chipperfield	4
Damian Mori	4
Aurelio Vidmar	4
Brett Emerton	3
Simon Colosimo	2
Steve Corica	2
Hayden Foxe	2
Shaun Murphy	2
Fausto De Amicis	1
Craig Moore	1
Josip Skoko	1
Tony Vidmar	1
Clayton Zane	1
