= Tonga national football team results =

Results and statistics of the Tonga national football team

The Tonga national football team represents Tonga in association football and is controlled by the Tonga Football Association (TFA), the governing body of the sport in the country. Before joining the Fédération Internationale de Football Association (FIFA) and the Oceania Football Confederation (OFC), it played its first match at the 1979 South Pacific Games – an 8–0 loss to Tahiti.

From a total of 70 matches, Tonga has won 16, drawn six and lost 48, scoring 82 goals and conceding 265. The majority of its matches have been played at neutral venues and the team has only played two home matches.

In 1994, the TFA joined both FIFA and the OFC and the national team began competing in the qualifying stages of the FIFA World Cup and the OFC Men's Nations Cup. During their second qualifying campaign for the 2002 FIFA World Cup in April 2001, Tonga was involved in a match which set the record for the largest margin of victory in international football – a 22–0 loss against Australia. The record only stood for two days before Australia recorded a 31–0 win against American Samoa.

Tonga's best success came at the inaugural Polynesia Cup in 1994 when they finished runners-up to Tahiti. As of 2024, Tonga has never qualified for the OFC Men's Nations Cup. Unaloto Fea'o became Tonga's top goalscorer after scoring against Samoa during qualification for the 2010 FIFA World Cup in August 2007. Fea'o has scored a total of seven goals in 17 caps between 2001 and 2017.

== Key ==
Key to matches

- Att.=Match attendance
- (H)=Home ground
- (A)=Away ground
- (N)=Neutral ground

Key to record by opponent

- Pld=Games played
- W=Games won
- D=Games drawn
- L=Games lost
- GF=Goals for
- GA=Goals against

== Results ==
Tonga's score is shown first in each case.

No.	Date	Venue	Opponents	Score	Competition	Tonga scorers	Att.	Ref.
1	29 August 1979	Buckhurst Park, Suva (N)	Tahiti	0–8	1979 South Pacific Games		—	
2	1 September 1979	Ratu Cakobau Park, Nausori (N)	Tuvalu	3–5	1979 South Pacific Games	Unknown	—	
3	5 September 1979	Ratu Cakobau Park, Nausori (N)	Wallis and Futuna	1–0	1979 South Pacific Games	Unknown	—	
4	6 September 1979	Ratu Cakobau Park, Nausori (N)	New Hebrides	1–7	1979 South Pacific Games	Unknown	—	
5	20 August 1983	Apia (N)	Wallis and Futuna	0–3	1983 South Pacific Games		—	
6	22 August 1983	Apia (N)	Western Samoa	3–3	1983 South Pacific Games	Unknown	—	
7	24 August 1983	Apia (N)	American Samoa	3–2	1983 South Pacific Games	Unknown	—	
8	7 December 1993	Port Vila (N)	Vanuatu	0–3	1993 South Pacific Mini Games		—	
9	10 December 1993	Port Vila (N)	Papua New Guinea	0–5	1993 South Pacific Mini Games		—	
10	13 December 1993	Port Vila (N)	New Caledonia	0–11	1993 South Pacific Mini Games		—	
11	24 November 1994	Western Samoa (N)	Tahiti	0–1	1994 Polynesia Cup		—	
12	25 November 1994	Western Samoa (N)	Western Samoa	2–2	1994 Polynesia Cup	Unknown	—	
13	28 November 1994	Western Samoa (N)	American Samoa	2–1	1994 Polynesia Cup	Unknown	—	
14	11 November 1996	Nukuʻalofa (N)	Cook Islands	2–0	1998 FIFA World Cup qualification	Moleni (2)	500	
15	15 November 1996	Nukuʻalofa (N)	Western Samoa	1–0	1998 FIFA World Cup qualification	Vane	1,500	
16	15 February 1997	Nukuʻalofa (H)	Solomon Islands	0–4	1998 FIFA World Cup qualification		3,000	
17	1 March 1997	Lawson Tama Stadium, Honiara (A)	Solomon Islands	0–9	1998 FIFA World Cup qualification		4,000	
18	2 September 1998	Rarotonga (N)	American Samoa	3–0	1998 Polynesia Cup	Unknown	—	
19	3 September 1998	Rarotonga (N)	Tahiti	0–5	1998 Polynesia Cup		—	
20	5 September 1998	Rarotonga (N)	Cook Islands	2–2	1998 Polynesia Cup	Unknown	—	
21	7 September 1998	Rarotonga (N)	Samoa	0–2	1998 Polynesia Cup		—	
22	6 June 2000	Paranuu Stadium, Papeete (N)	Samoa	0–4	2000 Polynesia Cup		—	
23	8 June 2000	Paranuu Stadium, Papeete (N)	Cook Islands	1–2	2000 Polynesia Cup	Unknown	—	
24	10 June 2000	Paranuu Stadium, Papeete (N)	Tahiti	1–8	2000 Polynesia Cup	Unknown	—	
25	14 June 2000	Paranuu Stadium, Papeete (N)	American Samoa	2–1	2000 Polynesia Cup	Unknown	—	
26	7 April 2001	International Sports Stadium, Coffs Harbour (N)	Samoa	1–0	2002 FIFA World Cup qualification	L. Taufahema	500	
27	9 April 2001	International Sports Stadium, Coffs Harbour (N)	Australia	0–22	2002 FIFA World Cup qualification		1,500	
28	14 April 2001	International Sports Stadium, Coffs Harbour (N)	American Samoa	5–0	2002 FIFA World Cup qualification	L. Taufahema (3), Moa, Fakava	1,000	
29	16 April 2001	International Sports Stadium, Coffs Harbour (N)	Fiji	1–8	2002 FIFA World Cup qualification	F. Taufahema	1,000	
30	9 March 2002	Toleofoa Joseph Blatter Soccer Complex, Apia (N)	Samoa	0–2	2002 OFC Nations Cup qualification		—	
31	12 March 2002	Toleofoa Joseph Blatter Soccer Complex, Apia (N)	American Samoa	7–2	2002 OFC Nations Cup qualification	Suli (3), Maamaaloa, F. Taufahema, Uele, Fifita	—	
32	14 March 2002	Toleofoa Joseph Blatter Soccer Complex, Apia (N)	Papua New Guinea	0–5	2002 OFC Nations Cup qualification		—	
33	16 March 2002	Toleofoa Joseph Blatter Soccer Complex, Apia (N)	New Caledonia	0–9	2002 OFC Nations Cup qualification		—	
34	1 July 2003	National Stadium, Suva (N)	Papua New Guinea	2–2	2003 South Pacific Games	Feao (2)	3,000	
35	3 July 2003	National Stadium, Suva (N)	New Caledonia	0–4	2003 South Pacific Games		700	
36	5 July 2003	Ratu Cakobau Park, Nausori (N)	Federated States of Micronesia	7–0	2003 South Pacific Games	Fonua, Tevi, Mark Uhatahi (2), Feao (2), Uele	1,000	
37	7 July 2003	Churchill Park, Lautoka (N)	Tahiti	0–4	2003 South Pacific Games		3,000	
38	10 May 2004	Lawson Tama Stadium, Honiara (N)	Solomon Islands	0–6	2006 FIFA World Cup qualification		12,385	
39	15 May 2004	Lawson Tama Stadium, Honiara (N)	Cook Islands	2–1	2006 FIFA World Cup qualification	Mark Uhatahi, Vaitaki	15,000	
40	17 May 2004	Lawson Tama Stadium, Honiara (N)	Tahiti	0–2	2006 FIFA World Cup qualification		400	
41	19 May 2004	Lawson Tama Stadium, Honiara (N)	New Caledonia	0–8	2006 FIFA World Cup qualification		15,000	
42	27 August 2007	Toleofoa Joseph Blatter Soccer Complex, Apia (N)	Solomon Islands	0–4	2007 South Pacific Games		350	
43	29 August 2007	Toleofoa Joseph Blatter Soccer Complex, Apia (N)	Samoa	1–2	2007 South Pacific Games	Feao	1,850	
44	1 September 2007	Toleofoa Joseph Blatter Soccer Complex, Apia (N)	American Samoa	4–0	2007 South Pacific Games	Moala, Palu (2), K. Uhatahi	200	
45	3 September 2007	Toleofoa Joseph Blatter Soccer Complex, Apia (N)	Vanuatu	1–4	2007 South Pacific Games	Savieti	50	
46	11 June 2009	Loto-Tonga Soka Centre, Nukuʻalofa (H)	Cook Islands	1–1	Friendly	Ma'ake Uhatahi	—	
47	13 June 2009	Loto-Tonga Soka Centre, Nukuʻalofa (H)	Cook Islands	1–2	Friendly	Ma'ake Uhatahi	—	
48	22 November 2011	National Soccer Stadium, Apia (N)	American Samoa	1–2	2014 FIFA World Cup qualification	Feao	150	
49	24 November 2011	National Soccer Stadium, Apia (N)	Samoa	1–1	2014 FIFA World Cup qualification	L. Taufahema	180	
50	26 November 2011	National Soccer Stadium, Apia (N)	Cook Islands	2–1	2014 FIFA World Cup qualification	Maamaaloa, Falatau	200	
51	19 August 2015	Govind Park, Ba (A)	Fiji	0–5	Friendly		—	
52	31 August 2015	Loto-Tonga Soka Centre (Field 1), Nukuʻalofa (N)	Cook Islands	0–3	2018 FIFA World Cup qualification		300	
53	2 September 2015	Loto-Tonga Soka Centre (Field 1), Nukuʻalofa (N)	American Samoa	1–2	2018 FIFA World Cup qualification	S. Uhatahi	200	
54	4 September 2015	Loto-Tonga Soka Centre (Field 2), Nukuʻalofa (N)	Samoa	0–3	2018 FIFA World Cup qualification		250	
55	2 December 2017	Port Vila Municipal Stadium, Port Vila (N)	Solomon Islands	0–8	2017 Pacific Mini Games		1,000	
56	6 December 2017	Korman Stadium, Port Vila (N)	Vanuatu	0–5	2017 Pacific Mini Games		6,000	
57	9 December 2017	Port Vila Municipal Stadium, Port Vila (N)	New Caledonia	2–4	2017 Pacific Mini Games	Feao, Uele	2,000	
58	12 December 2017	Port Vila Municipal Stadium, Port Vila (N)	Fiji	0–4	2017 Pacific Mini Games		1,000	
59	15 December 2017	Port Vila Municipal Stadium, Port Vila (N)	Tuvalu	3–4	2017 Pacific Mini Games	Polovili, Tokotaha (2)	1,000	
60	12 July 2019	National Soccer Stadium, Apia (N)	Samoa	0–2	2019 Pacific Games		1,200	
61	15 July 2019	National Soccer Stadium, Apia (N)	Vanuatu	0–14	2019 Pacific Games		100	
62	18 July 2019	National Soccer Stadium, Apia (N)	Papua New Guinea	0–8	2019 Pacific Games		100	
—	13 March 2022	Al-Arabi Stadium, Doha (N)	Cook Islands	w/o	2022 FIFA World Cup qualification		—	
63	18 November 2023	SIFF Academy Field, Honiara (N)	New Caledonia	0–7	2023 Pacific Games		—	
64	21 November 2023	SIFF Academy Field, Honiara (N)	Cook Islands	1–2	2023 Pacific Games	Kendler	—	
65	27 November 2023	SIFF Academy Field, Honiara (N)	Tuvalu	0–4	2023 Pacific Games		—	
66	30 November 2023	SIFF Academy Field, Honiara (N)	American Samoa	6–2	2023 Pacific Games	Polovili (2), Fifita (2), Tu’ifangaloka, Rajani	—	
67	20 March 2024	Teufaiva Stadium, Nuku'alofa (N)	Samoa	1–4	2024 OFC Nations Cup qualification	Kite	500	
68	26 March 2024	Teufaiva Stadium, Nuku'alofa (N)	Cook Islands	0–1	2024 OFC Nations Cup qualification		500	
69	6 September 2024	FFS Football Stadium (Field 1), Apia (N)	Cook Islands	3–1	2026 FIFA World Cup qualification	Tikoipau, Polovili, Kefu	300	
70	9 September 2024	FFS Football Stadium (Field 1), Apia (N)	Samoa	1–2 (a.e.t.)	2026 FIFA World Cup qualification	Sonasi	500	

Notes

1. A: The 1994 Polynesia Cup doubled as qualifiers for the 1996 OFC Nations Cup.
2. B: The 1998 Polynesia Cup doubled as qualifiers for the 1998 OFC Nations Cup.
3. C: The 2000 Polynesia Cup doubled as qualifiers for the 2000 OFC Nations Cup.
4. D: The first round of Oceanian qualifiers for the 2006 FIFA World Cup doubled as qualifiers for the 2004 OFC Nations Cup.
5. E: The men's football tournament at the 2007 South Pacific Games doubled as qualifiers for the 2008 OFC Nations Cup and the first round of qualifiers for the 2010 FIFA World Cup.
6. F: The Oceanian qualifiers for the 2014 FIFA World Cup doubled as qualifiers for the 2012 OFC Nations Cup.
7. G: The Oceanian qualifiers for the 2018 FIFA World Cup doubled as qualifiers for the 2016 OFC Nations Cup.
8. H: Tonga withdrew from qualifying for the 2022 FIFA World Cup due to the 2022 Hunga Tonga–Hunga Ha'apai eruption and tsunami.

== Record by opponent ==
Team	Pld	W	D	L	GF	GA	GD	WPCT
American Samoa	10	8	0	2	34	12	+22	80.00
Australia	1	0	0	1	0	22	−22	0.00
Cook Islands	11	4	2	5	15	16	−1	36.36
Federated States of Micronesia	1	1	0	0	7	0	+7	100.00
Fiji	3	0	0	3	1	17	−16	0.00
New Caledonia	6	0	0	6	2	43	−41	0.00
Papua New Guinea	4	0	1	3	2	20	−18	0.00
Samoa (Note: Includes results as Western Samoa.)	13	2	3	8	11	27	−16	15.38
Solomon Islands	5	0	0	5	0	31	−31	0.00
Tahiti	6	0	0	6	1	28	−27	0.00
Tuvalu	3	0	0	3	6	13	−7	0.00
Vanuatu (Note: Includes results as New Hebrides.)	5	0	0	5	2	33	−31	0.00
Wallis and Futuna	2	1	0	1	1	3	−2	50.00
Total	70	16	6	48	82	265	−183	22.86

Source: Results
