= List of Australia men's national soccer team hat-tricks =

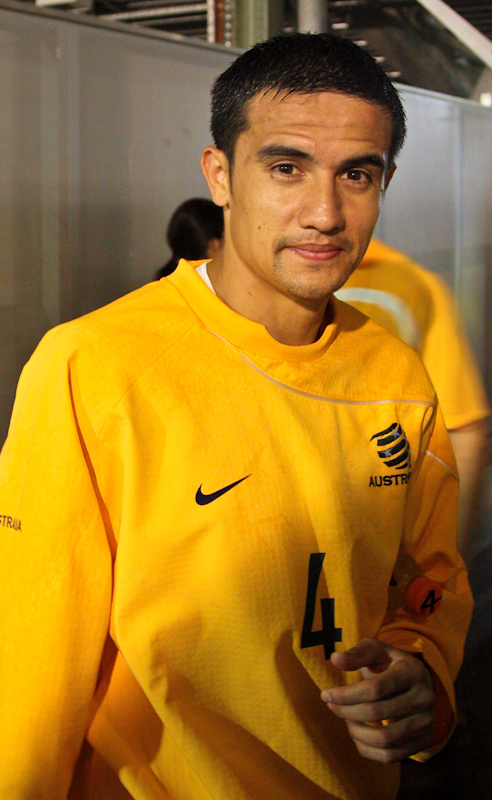
Tim Cahill has scored two hat-tricks for Australia, against Fiji and against Bangladesh.

Since the Socceroos' first match in 1922, 29 players have scored a hat-trick (three or more goals in a single match). The first player to do so was George Smith in a win over New Zealand in 1933. Archie Thompson's thirteen goals in the 31–0 victory over American Samoa is the world record for most goals in a match.

== Hat-tricks for Australia ==
| Date | Goals | Player | Opponent | Venue | Competition | Result (Note: The result is presented with Australia's score first.) | Ref |
|---|---|---|---|---|---|---|---|
| 17 June 1933 | 3 | George Smith | New Zealand | Sydney Cricket Ground, Sydney | Friendly | 6–4 | |
| 4 July 1936 | 4 | George Smith | New Zealand | Logan Park, Dunedin | Friendly | 7–1 | |
| 11 July 1936 | 5 | George Smith | New Zealand | Basin Reserve, Wellington | Friendly | 10–0 | |
| 7 June 1947 | 3 | Reg Date | South Africa | Newcastle Sports Ground, Newcastle | Friendly | 5–1 | |
| 14 August 1948 | 3 | Frank Parsons | New Zealand | Basin Reserve, Wellington | Friendly | 6–0 | |
| 28 August 1948 | 3 | Frank Parsons | New Zealand | Lancaster Park, Christchurch | Friendly | 7–0 | |
| 11 September 1948 | 6 | Frank Parsons | New Zealand | Blandford Park, Auckland | Friendly | 8–1 | |
| 3 December 1965 | 3 | Archie Blue | Taiwan | Hong Kong Stadium, Hong Kong | Friendly | 3–0 | |
| 5 November 1967 | 3 | Attila Abonyi | New Zealand | Cong Hoa Stadium, Saigon | Friendly | 5–3 | |
| 11 November 1967 | 3 | Attila Abonyi | Singapore | Cong Hoa Stadium, Saigon | Friendly | 5–3 | |
| 30 October 1977 | 3 | Peter Ollerton | Hong Kong | Hong Kong Stadium, Hong Kong | 1978 FIFA World Cup qualification | 5–2 | |
| 26 February 1980 | 3 | Ian Hunter | Papua New Guinea | Stade Numa-Daly Magenta, Noumea | 1980 OFC Nations Cup | 11–2 | |
| 26 February 1980 | 4 | Peter Sharne | Papua New Guinea | Stade Numa-Daly Magenta, Noumea | 1980 OFC Nations Cup | 11–2 | |
| 14 August 1981 | 7 | Gary Cole | Fiji | Olympic Park Stadium, Melbourne | 1982 FIFA World Cup qualification | 10–0 | |
| 14 August 1981 | 3 | David Mitchell | Fiji | Olympic Park Stadium, Melbourne | 1982 FIFA World Cup qualification | 10–0 | |
| 23 October 1985 | 3 | David Mitchell | Chinese Taipei | Hindmarsh Stadium, Adelaide | 1986 FIFA World Cup qualification | 7–0 | |
| 27 October 1985 | 3 | Zarko Odzakov | Chinese Taipei | St George Stadium, Sydney | 1986 FIFA World Cup qualification | 8–0 | |
| 27 October 1985 | 3 | John Kosmina | Chinese Taipei | St George Stadium, Sydney | 1986 FIFA World Cup qualification | 8–0 | |
| 27 October 1996 | 4 | Kris Trajanovski | Tahiti | Stade Pater, Papeete | 1996 OFC Nations Cup | 6–0 | |
| 1 November 1996 | 3 | Kris Trajanovski | Tahiti | Bruce Stadium, Canberra | 1996 OFC Nations Cup | 5–0 | |
| 11 June 1997 | 5 | Damian Mori | Solomon Islands | Parramatta Stadium, Sydney | 1998 FIFA World Cup qualification | 13–0 | |
| 11 June 1997 | 5 | John Aloisi | Solomon Islands | Parramatta Stadium, Sydney | 1998 FIFA World Cup qualification | 13–0 | |
| 25 September 1998 | 3 | Damian Mori | Fiji | Suncorp Stadium, Brisbane | 1998 OFC Nations Cup | 3–1 | |
| 28 September 1998 | 4 | Damian Mori | Cook Islands | Suncorp Stadium, Brisbane | 1998 OFC Nations Cup | 16–0 | |
| 28 September 1998 | 3 | Paul Trimboli | Cook Islands | Suncorp Stadium, Brisbane | 1998 OFC Nations Cup | 16–0 | |
| 28 September 1998 | 4 | Kris Trajanovski | Cook Islands | Suncorp Stadium, Brisbane | 1998 OFC Nations Cup | 16–0 | |
| 2 October 1998 | 3 | Damian Mori | Tahiti | Suncorp Stadium, Brisbane | 1998 OFC Nations Cup | 4–1 | |
| 19 June 2000 | 3 | Paul Agostino | Cook Islands | Stade Pater, Papeete | 2000 OFC Nations Cup | 17–0 | |
| 19 June 2000 | 4 | Craig Foster | Cook Islands | Stade Pater, Papeete | 2000 OFC Nations Cup | 17–0 | |
| 19 June 2000 | 3 | Clayton Zane | Cook Islands | Stade Pater, Papeete | 2000 OFC Nations Cup | 17–0 | |
| 9 April 2001 | 6 | John Aloisi | Tonga | BCU International Stadium, Coffs Harbour | 2002 FIFA World Cup qualification | 22–0 | |
| 9 April 2001 | 4 | Damian Mori | Tonga | BCU International Stadium, Coffs Harbour | 2002 FIFA World Cup qualification | 22–0 | |
| 9 April 2001 | 4 | Kevin Muscat | Tonga | BCU International Stadium, Coffs Harbour | 2002 FIFA World Cup qualification | 22–0 | |
| 11 April 2001 | 8 | David Zdrillic | American Samoa | BCU International Stadium, Coffs Harbour | 2002 FIFA World Cup qualification | 31–0 | |
| 11 April 2001 | 13 | Archie Thompson | American Samoa | BCU International Stadium, Coffs Harbour | 2002 FIFA World Cup qualification | 31–0 | |
| 11 April 2001 | 3 | Con Boutsianis | American Samoa | BCU International Stadium, Coffs Harbour | 2002 FIFA World Cup qualification | 31–0 | |
| 8 July 2002 | 4 | Bobby Despotovski | New Caledonia | Mount Smart Stadium, Auckland | 2002 OFC Nations Cup | 11–0 | |
| 10 July 2002 | 4 | Joel Porter | Fiji | Mount Smart Stadium, Auckland | 2002 OFC Nations Cup | 8–0 | |
| 31 May 2004 | 3 | Mile Sterjovski | Tahiti | Hindmarsh Stadium, Adelaide | 2004 OFC Nations Cup | 9–0 | |
| 2 June 2004 | 3 | Tim Cahill | Fiji | Hindmarsh Stadium, Adelaide | 2004 OFC Nations Cup | 6–1 | |
| 7 December 2012 | 3 | Archie Thompson | Guam | Hong Kong Stadium, Hong Kong | 2013 EAFF East Asian Cup preliminary round 2 | 9–0 | |
| 17 November 2015 | 3 | Tim Cahill | Bangladesh | Bangabandhu National Stadium, Dhaka | 2018 FIFA World Cup qualification | 4–0 | |
| 15 November 2017 | 3 | Mile Jedinak | Honduras | Stadium Australia, Sydney | 2018 FIFA World Cup qualification | 3–1 | |
| 10 October 2019 | 3 | Jamie Maclaren | Nepal | Canberra Stadium, Canberra | 2022 FIFA World Cup qualification | 5–0 | |
| 16 November 2023 | 3 | Jamie Maclaren | Bangladesh | Melbourne Rectangular Stadium, Melbourne | 2026 FIFA World Cup qualification | 7–0 | |

== Hat-tricks conceded by Australia ==
| Date | Goals | Player | Opponent | Venue | Competition | Result | Ref |
|---|---|---|---|---|---|---|---|
| 30 June 1923 | 4 | George Campbell | New Zealand | Jubilee Oval, Adelaide | Friendly | 1–4 | |
| 24 September 1938 | 3 | Robert Lumsden | India | Sydney Showground, Sydney | Friendly | 5–4 | |
| 1 October 1955 | 3 | Peter Hughes | South Africa | Newcastle Number 1 Sports Ground, Newcastle | Friendly | 1–4 | |
| 1 December 1956 | 3 | Neville D'Souza | India | Olympic Park Stadium, Melbourne | 1956 Summer Olympics | 1–4 | |
| 20 September 1988 | 3 | Romário | Brazil | Dongdaemun Stadium, Seoul | 1988 Summer Olympics | 0–3 | |
| 21 December 1997 | 3 | Ronaldo | Brazil | King Fahd Stadium, Riyadh | 1997 FIFA Confederations Cup final | 0–6 | |
| 21 December 1997 | 3 | Romário | Brazil | King Fahd Stadium, Riyadh | 1997 FIFA Confederations Cup final | 0–6 | |
| 6 June 1998 | 3 | Davor Šuker | Croatia | Stadion Maksimir, Zagreb | Friendly | 0–7 | |
| 18 June 2005 | 3 | Luciano Figueroa | Argentina | Max-Morlock-Stadion, Nuremberg | 2005 FIFA Confederations Cup | 2–4 | |
| 28 March 2018 | 3 | Ola Kamara | Norway | Ullevaal Stadion, Oslo | Friendly | 0–4 | |

== See also ==
- List of A-League hat-tricks
