= Tonga 0–22 Australia =

- Event: 2002 FIFA World Cup qualification (OFC)
Tonga	Australia
(Tonga)	(Australia)
0	22
- Date: 9 April 2001
- Venue: International Sports Stadium, Coffs Harbour, New South Wales
- Referee: Harry Atisson (Vanuatu)
- Attendance: 1,500
- Weather: 25.1 °C (77.2 °F)

On 9 April 2001, Tonga and Australia played an international soccer match at the International Sports Stadium in Coffs Harbour in the Australian state of New South Wales. The match was an Oceania Football Confederation (OFC) first round qualifying match for the 2002 FIFA World Cup. Tonga, nominally the home team for this round robin qualifying match, were defeated 0–22 by Australia. This beat the previous international record of 20–0 from October 2000 when Kuwait defeated Bhutan on 12 February 2000 in qualification for the 2000 AFC Asian Cup. (Note: A Libyan team defeated Oman 21–0 in 1966, however Oman was not a FIFA member at the time) The margin of defeat also beat the previous record in a FIFA World Cup qualifying match, the 19–0 result between Iran and Guam in Tabriz in November 2000. The margin was surpassed two days later when Australia again prevailed, defeating a depleted American Samoa team with a 31–0 scoreline.

== Background ==
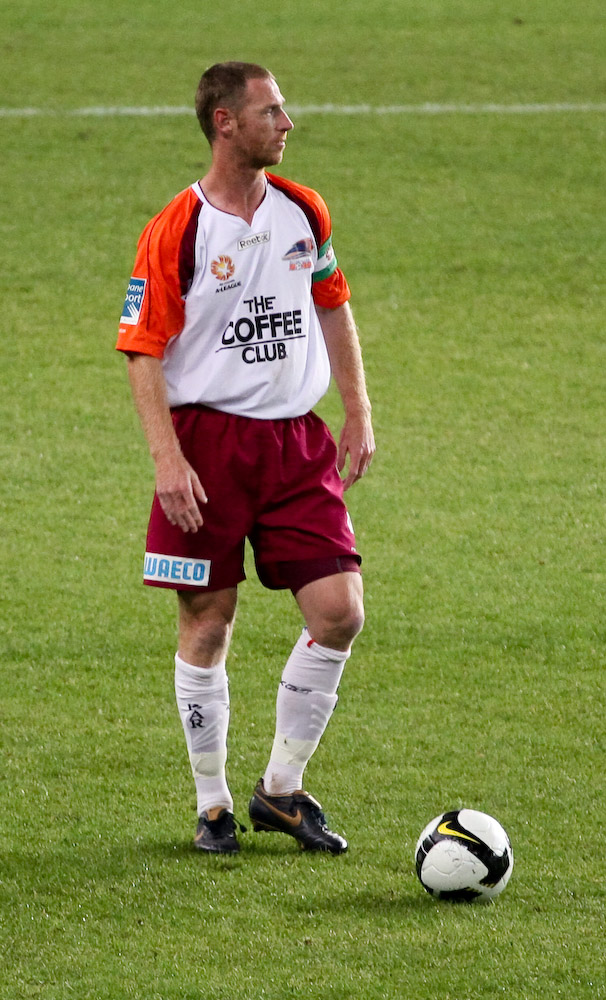
Craig Moore, pictured in 2008, was one of eight players called up from European leagues

Ten teams from the Oceania Football Confederation (OFC) entered the 2002 FIFA World Cup qualification tournament. The teams were split into two groups of five, with Group 1 playing in Australia at the International Sports Stadium in Coffs Harbour on the New South Wales North Coast. Group 2 was based in Auckland, New Zealand. Australia and New Zealand, traditionally the two strongest teams in the OFC, were split for the group stage. Group 1 included Australia, Fiji, Tonga, Samoa and American Samoa; of which only Australia had previously appeared at the finals of a FIFA World Cup. The venue was chosen by Soccer Australia in December 2000, with national coach Frank Farina citing the pitch quality as a key factor in the decision. Australia's hosting rights were briefly under threat as a result of sanctions placed by Australia against Fiji after the 2000 Fijian coup d'état.

In January 2001, Australian coach Frank Farina suggested that he would head into the tournament with a squad split 50/50 between Australia and Europe. With the qualifying tournament occurring during the European season, a number of clubs had appealed to FIFA to stop Australia from selecting European-based players. While Soccer Australia chairman Tony Labbozzetta initially agreed to FIFA demands that European-based players not play, Farina went ahead and selected a 20-man team of which eight were European-based. Even after the squad was named, a number of managers of European-based players continued to complain of being deprived of their services. In early April, after Coventry City player Mustapha Hadji was suspended, manager Gordon Strachan appealed for John Aloisi to be released or banned from national duty.

Australian midfielder Con Boutsianis was in doubt until the week before the match as he faced a County Court of Victoria trial after being involved in an armed robbery in 1998. Ultimately he was found guilty of theft, receiving a fine of A$20,000 and a two-year good behaviour bond; leaving him free to play.

Ahead of the match, Ned Zelic effectively ended any hope of an Australian recall when he gave an interview on Planetfootball.com. He was quoted as saying, "Because I don't play for them (any) more, I don't care if they make it (to the World Cup finals) or not" and that he wished he had played for Croatia, "Now I would like to play for Croatia, but that is no longer possible."

With regular Australia captain Paul Okon choosing to prioritise playing for Middlesbrough over the national team, Kevin Muscat was a surprise choice for captain. It was suggested that his disciplinary troubles at club level would rule him out as a captaincy choice.

In the first match of the qualifying tournament, Tonga had defeated Samoa 1–0. While this was Tonga's second match, this was Australia's first with their last match before the tournament being a 3–2 loss to Colombia in Bogotá in February.

== Match summary ==
The scoring was opened in the third minute by midfielder Scott Chipperfield with a tap-in inside the six-yard box from a Damian Mori cross. In the 12th minute, Mori headed in a cross to make the score 0–2. Two minutes later, John Aloisi scored, turning onto his left foot, from outside the penalty area. Kevin Muscat scored the fourth goal after 17 minutes from the penalty spot after Scott Chipperfield was brought down by Kilifi Uele. Damian Mori scored his second in the 23rd minute with an angled shot beating the goalkeeper from just outside the six yard box. John Aloisi turned in a low cross from Mori to take the score to 0–6 a minute later. Muscat scored his second penalty in the 30th minute when the Vanuatuan referee Harry Attison adjudged a penalty against a Tongan defender. Aloisi brought up his hat-trick in the 37th minute with a headed goal from a headed cross. Mori became the second Australian with a hat-trick two minutes later when headed in a Lindsay Wilson cross. Aloisi scored his fourth goal in the 45th minute when he headed in a cross from six yards. The first half ended with the score at 0–10.

Aloisi scored his fifth goal after 51 minutes, turning the ball in after the ball bounced off several players, allowing him to get into a one-on-one with the goalkeeper. Referee Attison adjudged that Teu Fakava had handled the ball. Muscat brought up a hat-trick of penalties, putting the ball past goalkeeper Tuahiva Fincfeuiaki. Mori scored his fourth with his head inside the six yard box from a ball played by Muscat. Aloisi scored his sixth goal, converting a Wilson cross inside the six yard box. Tonga coach Gary Phillips made three changes after 63 minutes, bringing on Unaloto Feao, Solomone Moa and Timote Moleni with Toakai Toto, Filisione Taufahema and Lokoua Taufahema leaving the game. Tony Popovic put the ball in the net from a corner near the penalty spot in the 65th minute to bring the score to 0–15. Farina decided to make two changes in the 69th minute, substituting on David Zdrilic for Mori and Con Boutsianis, on his debut, for Steve Corica. Tony Vidmar headed in a corner from Boutsianis in the 73rd minute with the score moving to 0–16. Archie Thompson replaced Aloisi in the 73rd minute. Zdrilic scored the 17th goal in the 77th minute after the ball was cut back into the penalty area. Thompson put the ball past the goalkeeper from a Wilson cross in the 80th minute to get his first international goal. Muscat tapped the ball past Fincfeuiaki after the Tonga 'keeper blocked a long-range shot into his path. The score moved to 0–20 after the Tongan goalkeeper dropped the ball and Chipperfield scored from well inside the six yard box. Boutsianis scored his first national team goal, tucking in a shot from a tight angle after the goalkeeper blocked his initial shot. The final goal was scored in the 90th minute by Zdrilic.

=== Records ===
At 0–20, the game became the highest scoring FIFA World Cup qualifying match, beating the 19–0 result between Iran and Guam in Tabriz in November 2000. At 0–21, the underway game was already the highest scoring international match, surpassing the 20–0 from October 2000 when Kuwait defeated Bhutan on 12 February 2000 in qualification for the 2000 AFC Asian Cup. The record was beaten two days later when Australia defeated American Samoa 31–0.

Mori's four goals took him to 26 career goals, passing John Kosmina and Attila Abonyi to top the all-time Australia international goalscoring list.

=== Details ===
9 April 2001
16:30 UTC+10
First round – 3rd fixture

Tonga	0–22	Australia
	Report	Chipperfield 3', 84'; Mori 12', 22', 39', 57'; Aloisi 14', 23', 36', 45', 51', 63'; Muscat 17' (pen.), 28' (pen.), 54' (pen.), 83'; Popovic 65'; T. Vidmar 73'; Zdrilic 77', 90'; Thompson 79'; Boutsianis 85'

International Sports Stadium, Coffs Harbour
Attendance: 1,500
Referee: Harry Attison (Vanuatu)

Tonga	Australia

GK	1	Tuahiva Fincfeuiaki
DF	3	Toakai Toto	(substituted off) 63'
DF	5	Filisione Taufahema	(substituted off) 63'
DF	6	Halapua Falepapalangi
MF	2	Kilifi Uele
MF	9	Lokoua Taufahema	(substituted off) 63'
MF	10	Siua Ma'amaloa
MF	11	Akoli Mafi
FW	16	Hateni Manu
FW	17	Kaisani Uhatahi
FW	19	Teu Fakava
Substitutes:
FW	7	Solomone Moa	(substituted in) 63'
MF	15	Timote Moleni	(substituted in) 63'
FW	18	Penieli Moa	(substituted in) 63'
FW	4	Unaloto Feao
MF	8	Ipeni Fonua
MF	12	Taniela Fonua
MF	13	Falame Ilangana
MF	14	Lopeti Fuimaono
GK	20	Villiami Taufahema
Coach:
(Australia) Gary Phillips

GK	18	Clint Bolton
CB	2	Kevin Muscat (c)
CB	3	Craig Moore
CB	4	Tony Popovic
DM	6	Hayden Foxe
RM	16	Lindsay Wilson
LM	8	Scott Chipperfield
AM	10	Steve Corica	(substituted off) 69'
RF	9	John Aloisi	(substituted off) 73'
CF	19	Damian Mori	(substituted off) 69'
LF	5	Tony Vidmar
Substitutes:
MF	13	Con Boutsianis	(substituted in) 69'
FW	11	David Zdrilic	(substituted in) 69'
FW	20	Archie Thompson	(substituted in) 73'
GK	1	Michael Petkovic
FW	7	Aurelio Vidmar
DF	12	Steve Horvat
DF	14	Simon Colosimo
DF	15	Fausto De Amicis
DF	17	Scott Miller
Coach:
Frank Farina

Assistant referees:
Elise Doriri (Vanuatu)
Teariki Goodwin (Cook Islands)
Fourth official:
Ronan Leaustic (Tahiti)

== Reaction ==
Frank Farina described the win as "embarrassing" and called on the OFC to review the competition format. Tonga coach Gary Phillips questioned the need for Australia to call up so many European-based players saying, "All up if you combine the total monetary worth of the Socceroos and divide it by five, then you have the total economy of Tonga."

Gordon Strachan, John Aloisi's manager at Coventry City condemned FIFA and the Australian federation for letting Australia select his striker. Strachan was quoted in the Coventry Telegraph, "I am angry with FIFA for letting this situation occur and angry with the Australian FA but there is nothing we can do. We have already appealed to people's decency but that has not worked." He pointed out that other Australian players, including regular Australian captain Paul Okon and goalkeeper Mark Schwarzer, were allowed to play in English football while he was denied Aloisi's services.

Rangers manager, Dick Advocaat was already angry about losing two of his players, Craig Moore and Tony Vidmar, but was especially critical of Farina saying, "It says enough about the stupidity of the situation when a team is winning 22–0 and the annoying thing is that the Australian manager clearly does not need all of his overseas players to win a game like that." Like Strachan, he noted that several regular first-choice players were allowed to continue playing in England. Responding to Advocaat's criticism, Farina was unrepentant saying, "Dick from Rangers has had his say and I am sure Dick has got his problems" and "Dick can blow as much wind out of his mouth as he likes, but it's not changing."

Australian soccer writer Michael Cockerill wrote in The Sydney Morning Herald after Australia's subsequent 31–0 win over American Samoa wrote, "[f]ifty-three goals in two games. The record books torn to bits. It is too late to end the carnage this time around, but there should be no repetition in four years."

== Qualification ==
Australia went on to defeat American Samoa 31–0, Fiji 2–0 and Samoa 11–0. They finished first in their group with a maximum possible 12 points and a goal difference of +66.

In the second stage of qualifying, Australia defeated New Zealand with an aggregate score of 6–1 to win a place in the CONMEBOL–OFC playoff against the fifth-placed South American team. Despite winning the first leg against Uruguay 1–0 in Melbourne, they were beaten 3–0 in Montevideo to be eliminated 3–1 on aggregate.
