= Taufahema =

Taufahema is a surname. Notable people with the surname include:

- Lokoua Taufahema (born 1973), Tongan footballer
- Taunaholo Taufahema (born 1969), Tongan rugby union player
