= 2002 FIFA World Cup qualification (OFC) =

Tournament details
- Dates: 7 April – 25 November 2001
- Teams: 10 (Note: Papua New Guinea chose not to participate.) (from 1 confederation)

Tournament statistics
- Matches played: 22
- Goals scored: 179 (8.14 per match)
- Attendance: 87,894 (3,995 per match)
- Top scorer(s): (Australia) Archie Thompson (16 goals)

The Oceanian (OFC) qualification rounds for the 2002 FIFA World Cup took place between 7 April and 24 June 2001. In total, 10 teams entered the competition for a play-off against a team from South America (CONMEBOL) to qualify for the finals in South Korea and Japan.

Following two rounds of qualifying, Australia advanced to the OFC–CONMEBOL play-off. In the play-off, Australia lost to Uruguay so no teams from Oceania qualified for the World Cup.

The competition is considered controversial after a number of one-sided matches. Australia scored a total of 72 goals in their six matches which included two world-record victories two days apart – 22–0 against Tonga and 31–0 against American Samoa. Top scorer Archie Thompson equalled the record for goals scored by a single player in a match after netting 13 times against American Samoa – a record which had stood since 1885. The reaction to the one-sided nature of the tournament led to a change in the format for future Oceanian qualification tournaments.

== Background ==
Teams from Oceania first took part in qualification for the FIFA World Cup in 1966 when Australia entered. In 1974, Australia also became the first team from Oceania to qualify after defeating South Korea in the final round of qualification. Oceanian teams had limited experience at the World Cup after only Australia in 1974 and New Zealand in 1982 had qualified for the finals.

== Format ==
In the first round, the 10 teams were drawn into two single round robin groups of five teams. The group winners would then contest a two-legged tie to decide which team would advance to the OFC–CONMEBOL play-off.

=== Participants ===
- American Samoa
- Australia
- Cook Islands
- Fiji
- New Zealand
- Samoa
- Solomon Islands
- Tahiti
- Tonga
- Vanuatu

== First round ==
=== Group 1 ===
All matches were played in Coffs Harbour, New South Wales, Australia. The group was controversial after the world record margin of victory in an international match was broken twice in the space of two days. Australia recorded a 22–0 win against Tonga on 9 April before defeating American Samoa 31–0 on 11 April. After scoring 66 times in just four matches, Australia advanced to the second round.

==== Table ====
Pos	Team	Pld	W	D	L	GF	GA	GD	Pts	Qualification	Australia men's national soccer team	Fiji national football team	Tonga national football team	Samoa national football team	American Samoa national football team
1	Australia	4	4	0	0	66	0	+66	12	Advance to second round	—	—	—	11–0	31–0
2	Fiji	4	3	0	1	27	4	+23	9		0–2	—	—	—	13–0
3	Tonga	4	2	0	2	7	30	−23	6		0–22	1–8	—	—	—
4	Samoa	4	1	0	3	9	18	−9	3		—	1–6	0–1	—	—
5	American Samoa	4	0	0	4	0	57	−57	0		—	—	0–5	0–8	—

==== Matches ====
7 April 2001
16:30

Samoa	0–1	Tonga
		Taufahema 86'

International Sports Stadium, Coffs Harbour
Attendance: 500
Referee: Ronan Leaustic (Tahiti)
7 April 2001
19:00

Fiji	13–0	American Samoa
Masi 3' (pen.), 12', 53', 54'; Lal 23', 24', 28', 39', 45'; Mateiwai 31'; Nasema 56'; Samy 70', 75'

International Sports Stadium, Coffs Harbour
Attendance: 500
Referee: Derek Rugg (New Zealand)

9 April 2001
16:30

Tonga	0–22	Australia
		Chipperfield 3', 83'; Mori 13', 23', 40', 58'; Aloisi 14', 24', 37', 45', 52', 63'; Muscat 18', 30', 54', 82'; Popovic 67'; T. Vidmar 74'; Zdrilic 78', 90'; Thompson 80'; Boutsianis 87'

International Sports Stadium, Coffs Harbour
Attendance: 1,500
Referee: Harry Attison (Vanuatu)
9 April 2001
19:00

American Samoa	0–8	Samoa
		Leututu 8' (o.g.); Gabriel 35'; Fa'aiuaso 41', 52', 73', 84'; Lemana 55'; Michael 63'

International Sports Stadium, Coffs Harbour
Attendance: 200
Referee: Brian Precious (New Zealand)

11 April 2001
16:30

Samoa	1–6	Fiji
Lemana 33' (pen.)		Mateiwai 5'; Masi 21', 41'; Tokuma 48' (o.g.); Prasad 84', 86'

International Sports Stadium, Coffs Harbour
Attendance: 400
Referee: Henry Attison (Vanuatu)
11 April 2001
19:00

Australia	31–0	American Samoa
Boutsianis 10', 50', 84'; Thompson 12', 23', 27', 29', 32', 37', 42', 45', 56', 60', 65', 85', 88'; Zdrilic 13', 21', 25', 33', 58', 66', 78', 89'; A. Vidmar 14', 80'; Popovic 17', 19'; Colosimo 51', 81'; De Amicis 55'

International Sports Stadium, Coffs Harbour
Attendance: 3,000
Referee: Ronan Leaustic (Tahiti)

14 April 2001
16:30

Fiji	0–2	Australia
		Corica 23'; Foxe 81'

International Sports Stadium, Coffs Harbour
Attendance: 5,000
Referee: Derek Rugg (New Zealand)
14 April 2001
19:00

American Samoa	0–5	Tonga
		Taufahema 2', 24', 51'; Moa 71' (pen.); Fakava 86'

International Sports Stadium, Coffs Harbour
Attendance: 1,000
Referee: Brian Precious (New Zealand)

16 April 2001
16:30

Australia	11–0	Samoa
A. Vidmar 5', 50'; Zdrilic 28', 57'; Foxe 44'; Popovic 55', 89'; Thompson 75', 88'; Chipperfield 76'; Bureta 81' (o.g.)

International Sports Stadium, Coffs Harbour
Attendance: 2,000
Referee: Brian Precious (New Zealand)
16 April 2001
19:00

Tonga	1–8	Fiji
Taufahema 78'		Leka 4'; Masi 30', 37', 38', 90'; Vurukania 34', 56'; Nasema 62'

International Sports Stadium, Coffs Harbour
Attendance: 1,000
Referee: Ronan Leaustic (Tahiti)

=== Group 2 ===
All matches were played in Auckland, New Zealand. New Zealand advanced to the second round.

==== Table ====
Pos	Team	Pld	W	D	L	GF	GA	GD	Pts	Qualification	New Zealand men's national football team	Tahiti national football team	Solomon Islands national football team	Vanuatu national football team	Cook Islands national football team
1	New Zealand	4	4	0	0	19	1	+18	12	Advance to second round	—	—	—	7–0	2–0
2	Tahiti	4	3	0	1	14	6	+8	9		0–5	—	2–0	—	—
3	Solomon Islands	4	2	0	2	17	10	+7	6		1–5	—	—	—	9–1
4	Vanuatu	4	1	0	3	11	21	−10	3		—	1–6	2–7	—	—
5	Cook Islands	4	0	0	4	2	25	−23	0		—	0–6	—	1–8	—

==== Matches ====
4 June 2001
16:30

Vanuatu	1–6	Tahiti
Lauru 56'		Senechal 26'; Bennett 36', 41', 81'; Amaru 52'; Tagawa 82'

North Harbour Stadium, Auckland
Attendance: 400
Referee: Intaz Shah (Fiji)
4 June 2001
16:30

Solomon Islands	9–1	Cook Islands
Suri 14'; Daudau 19', 54', 75'; Menapi 31', 52', 85'; Firisua 84'; Konofilla 89'		Temiha 4'

North Harbour Stadium, Auckland
Attendance: 1,542
Referee: Brett Hugo (Australia)

6 June 2001
16:30

Tahiti	0–5	New Zealand
		Coveny 41', 56', 71'; Lines 53'; Perry 88'

North Harbour Stadium, Auckland
Attendance: 2,052
Referee: Leslie Irvine (Northern Ireland)
6 June 2001
16:30

Cook Islands	1–8	Vanuatu
Pukoku 13'		Ben 4'; Lauru 27'; G. Maki 38'; Iwai 50', 59', 66', 82'; P. Maki 74'

North Harbour Stadium, Auckland
Attendance: 600
Referee: Matthew Breeze (Australia)

8 June 2001
16:30

Vanuatu	2–7	Solomon Islands
Iwai 18', 48'		Wickham 17', 47'; Menapi 46', 73'; Waita 48'; Samani 62'; Suri 79'

North Harbour Stadium, Auckland
Attendance: 1,674
Referee: Edward Lennie (Australia)
8 June 2001
16:30

New Zealand	2–0	Cook Islands
Hickey 64', 66'

North Harbour Stadium, Auckland
Attendance: 500
Referee: Brett Hugo (Australia)

11 June 2001
16:30

Solomon Islands	1–5	New Zealand
Suri 85'		Coveny 27', 50'; Jackson 32', 55'; Urlovic 67'

North Harbour Stadium, Auckland
Attendance: 2,500
Referee: Intaz Shah (Fiji)
11 June 2001
16:30

Cook Islands	0–6	Tahiti
		Senechal 2', 45'; Tagawa 19', 64', 87'; Bennett 51'

North Harbour Stadium, Auckland
Attendance: 300
Referee: Edward Lennie (Australia)

13 June 2001
16:30

New Zealand	7–0	Vanuatu
Coveny 2', 7', 30'; Jackson 25'; Lines 27'; Burton 62'; Vicelich 68'

North Harbour Stadium, Auckland
Attendance: 1,500
Referee: Leslie Irvine (Northern Ireland)
13 June 2001
16:30

Tahiti	2–0	Solomon Islands
Garcia 25' (pen.); Fatupua-Lecaill 77'

North Harbour Stadium, Auckland
Attendance: 250
Referee: Matthew Breeze (Australia)

== Second round ==
A brace from Brett Emerton helped Australia to a 2–0 win in the first leg in Wellington. They extended their advantage in the second leg, winning 4–1 as they advanced to the OFC–CONMEBOL play-off.

Second round
Team 1	Agg.	Team 2	1st leg	2nd leg
New Zealand	1–6	Australia	0–2	1–4

=== First leg ===
20 June 2001
19:30

New Zealand	0–2	Australia
		Emerton 5', 80'

Wellington Regional Stadium, Wellington
Attendance: 19,500
Referee: Masayoshi Okada (Japan)

NZL	AUS

=== Second leg ===
24 June 2001
15:00

Australia	4–1	New Zealand
Zdrilic 5', 82'; Emerton 40'; Aloisi 56'		Coveny 44' (pen.)

Stadium Australia, Sydney
Attendance: 41,976
Referee: Kwon Jong-Chul (South Korea)

AUS	NZL

== Aftermath ==
=== Play-off ===
A late penalty from Kevin Muscat gave Australia a narrow lead following the first leg in Melbourne. However, Uruguay fought back in the second leg and a brace from Richard Morales ultimately proved decisive as Uruguay qualified for the 2002 FIFA World Cup.

Team 1	Agg.	Team 2	1st leg	2nd leg
Australia	1–3	Uruguay	1–0	0–3

=== Changes to qualification ===
Australia's world record wins drew criticism, particularly from clubs in Europe whose players had been called up for the qualification matches. Coventry City manager Gordon Strachan and Rangers manager Dick Advocaat both complained about the process. Australia coach Frank Farina described the win against Tonga as "embarrassing" and called on the OFC to review the competition format. He repeated those comments after the American Samoa match, as did Archie Thompson – who scored a record-equalling 13 goals in a single match.

A different qualification format for the 2006 FIFA World Cup was established. Qualification was incorporated into the 2004 OFC Nations Cup and both Australia and New Zealand were given a bye in the first round.

== Goalscorers ==
There were 179 goals scored in 22 matches, for an average of 8.14 goals per match.

16 goals

- (Australia) Archie Thompson

14 goals

- (Australia) David Zdrilic

9 goals

- (Fiji) Esala Masi
- (New Zealand) Vaughan Coveny

7 goals

- (Australia) John Aloisi

5 goals

- (Australia) Tony Popovic
- (Fiji) Shalendra Lal
- (Solomon Islands) Commins Menapi
- (Vanuatu) Richard Iwai

4 goals

- (Australia) Con Boutsianis
- (Australia) Damian Mori
- (Australia) Kevin Muscat
- (Australia) Aurelio Vidmar
- (Samoa) Desmond Fa'aiuaso
- (French Polynesia) Naea Bennett
- (French Polynesia) Felix Tagawa
- (Tonga) Lokoua Taufahema

3 goals

- (Australia) Scott Chipperfield
- (Australia) Brett Emerton
- (New Zealand) Chris Jackson
- (Solomon Islands) Patteson Daudau
- (Solomon Islands) Batram Suri
- (French Polynesia) Tony Senechal

2 goals

- (Australia) Simon Colosimo
- (Australia) Hayden Foxe
- (Fiji) Manoa Masi
- (Fiji) Ulaiasi Mateiwai
- (Fiji) Valerio Nasema
- (Fiji) Atnesh Prasad
- (Fiji) Abinesh Samy
- (New Zealand) Noah Hickey
- (New Zealand) Aaran Lines
- (Samoa) Ben Lemana
- (Solomon Islands) Vivian Wickham
- (Vanuatu) Simon Lauru

1 goal

- (Australia) Fausto De Amicis
- (Australia) Steve Corica
- (Australia) Tony Vidmar
- (Cook Islands) Junior Pukoku
- (Cook Islands) Niki Temiha
- (Fiji) Jope Namawa Leka
- (Fiji) Leone Vurukania
- (New Zealand) Mark Burton
- (New Zealand) Jonathan Perry
- (New Zealand) Paul Urlovic
- (New Zealand) Ivan Vicelich
- (Samoa) Dominic Gabriel
- (Samoa) Junior Michael
- (Solomon Islands) David Firisua
- (Solomon Islands) Joel Konofilla
- (Solomon Islands) Jack Samani
- (Solomon Islands) Stanley Waita
- (French Polynesia) Harold Amaru
- (French Polynesia) Samuel Garcia
- (French Polynesia) Steve Fatupua-Lecaill
- (Tonga) Teu Fakava
- (Tonga) Penieli Moa
- (Tonga) Fillisione Taufahema
- (Vanuatu) Jimmy Ben
- (Vanuatu) Gerard Maki
- (Vanuatu) Pita Maki
- (Vanuatu) Waren Waiwai

1 own goal

- (American Samoa) Lisi Leututu (against Samoa)
- (Samoa) Filipo Bureta (against Australia)
- (Samoa) Molesi Tokuma (against Fiji)
