= Pissant =

Small ant; also a pejorative

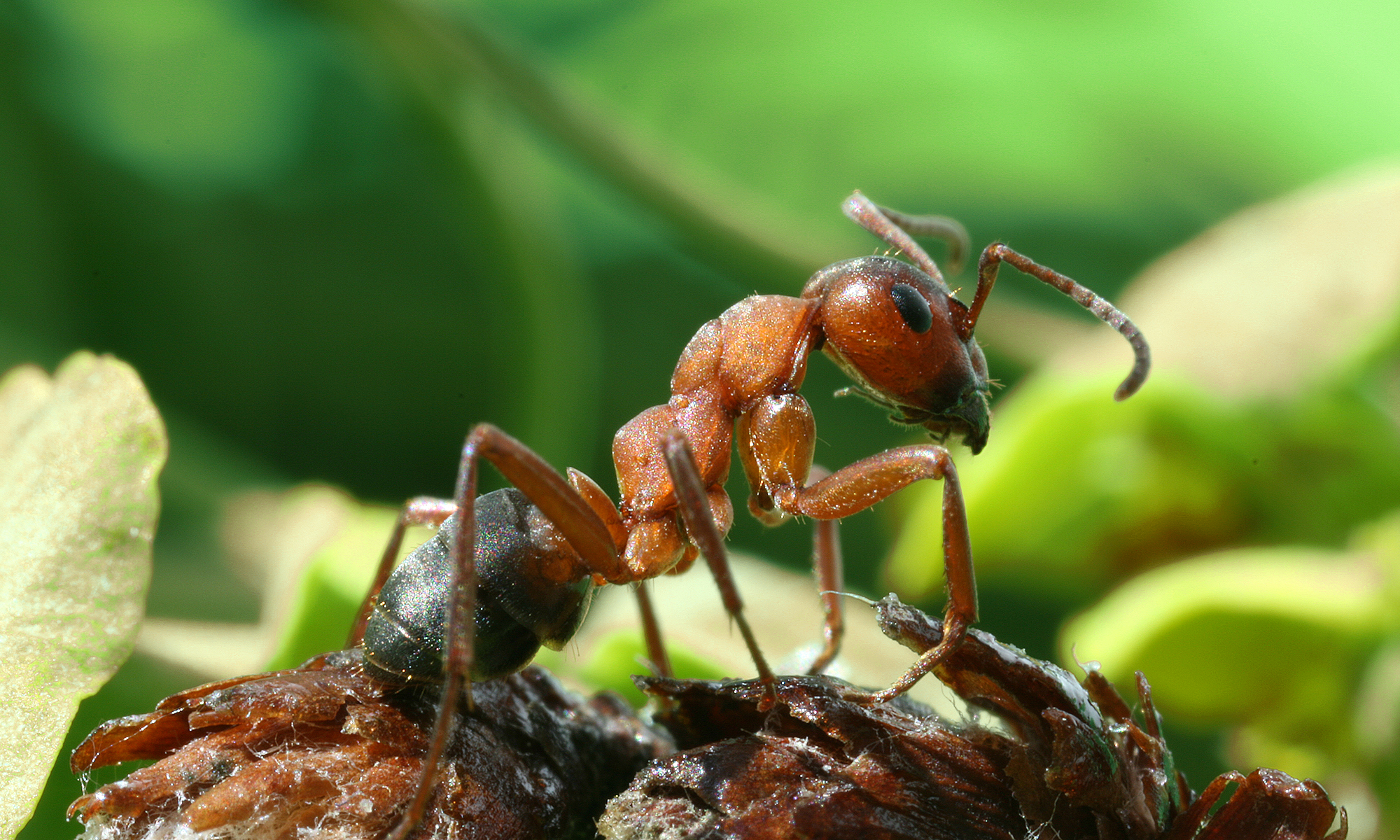
Formica rufa, a typical pissant

A pissant, also seen as piss ant or piss-ant, refers to a type of ant. The word is also used as a pejorative noun or adjective, indicating insignificance.

The original pissant is any of a certain group of large ant species, commonly called wood ants, that make mounded nests in forests throughout most of Europe. The Swedish form of the name pissant (pissmyra) was used already by Linnaeus in 1761. The name arises from the formic acid that constitutes their venom and that they can eject from their abdomen in an "acid squirting" behaviour. Formica rufa is one such ant, but there are others with similar characteristics. Forelius and Iridomyrmex are two genera of piss ants. In the United States, the word pissant may refer to any small ant that infests a home.

== Slang ==
Pissant is an epithet for an inconsequential, irrelevant, or worthless person, especially one who is irritating or contemptible out of proportion to his or her perceived significance. A Virginia politician is said to have silenced a heckler by saying, "I'm a big dog on a big hunt and I don't have time for a piss-ant on a melon stalk".

The term piss-ant also may be used as an adjective, usually as a pejorative, to mean insignificant and annoying. In conversations with his advisors during the Vietnam War, U.S. President Lyndon B. Johnson referred to Vietnam as "a piddling piss-ant little country". In the context of incorporating a celebrity's family into the limelight, Alex Reimer, a frequent guest at Boston's radio station WEEI, called Tom Brady's daughter "an annoying little pissant" in January 2018 prior to Super Bowl LII.

== Culture ==
Pissant also may be used positively. Ron Ault of the AFL-CIO said, in describing the relationship of his trade union to the Pentagon, "Our job is to be the irritant piss ant stinging them on their ankles at every opportunity."

After being defeated 4–0 in a 2009 Australian semi-final football match against Melbourne Victory, Adelaide United coach Aurelio Vidmar's post-match press conference became infamous when he described Adelaide as a "pissant town", with the Adelaide media perceived to be working against him and the club. The rant gained nationwide publicity in Australia.

In the 1960 musical The Unsinkable Molly Brown, the title character says, "I'm as good as any piss ant that ever lived!" in the patter opening to the song "I Ain't Down Yet".

A character in Kurt Vonnegut's 1963 novel Cat's Cradle had a specific definition of a pissant as type of person:

A pissant is somebody who thinks he's so damn smart, he can never keep his mouth shut. No matter what anybody says, he's got to argue with it. You say you like something, and, by God, he'll tell you why you're wrong to like it. A pissant does his best to make you feel like a boob all the time. No matter what you say, he knows better.

Chapter 1 of Stephen King's The Stand (1978) opens with the words:

Hapscomb's Texaco sat on Number 93 just north of Arnette, a pissant four-street burg about 110 miles from Houston.

Tony Stark nicknames Ant-Man a pissant in Avengers: Endgame (2019).

Brandon Jack, a former Australian rules footballer, named his 2025 novel set in a professional Australian Football League club, Pissants.

== See also ==
- Formica pratensis
- Formica polyctena
