= Shaun Easthope =

International footballer

Shaun Easthope (born 23 May 1981) is a Samoan footballer who plays as a midfielder. He played for Samoa at 2014 FIFA World Cup qualifiers.

Easthope studied at Naenae College in Lower Hutt, New Zealand. In 1997 was selected for the Junior All-Whites for the world championships in Egypt.

In 2003 he played for Miramar Rangers.

In December 2005 he joined Napier City Rovers.

In January 2009 he faced a hearing after criticising a referee's decision after a match.

In October 2015 he was appointed development officer for the Fiji Football Association.

In 2018 he was appointed coach of Wellington Olympic.
