= 2002 FIFA World Cup qualification (inter-confederation play-offs) =

Tournament details
- Dates: 10–25 November 2001
- Teams: 4 (from 4 confederations)

Tournament statistics
- Matches played: 4
- Goals scored: 7 (1.75 per match)
- Attendance: 283,194 (70,799 per match)
- Top scorer(s): (Uruguay) Richard Morales (2 goals)

For the 2002 FIFA World Cup qualification, there were two inter-confederation play-offs to determine the final two qualification spots to the 2002 FIFA World Cup. They were won by Ireland and Uruguay. The matches were played between 10 and 25 November 2001. As of 2022, this remains the last time a European team earned a World Cup spot through an intercontinental play-off. From 2006 onwards, the remaining European qualifiers would be determined by continental play-offs.

== Format ==
The four teams from the four confederations (AFC, CONMEBOL, OFC, and UEFA) were drawn into two ties.

The ties themselves were not drawn, but were allocated by FIFA as:

- UEFA first round randomly drawn runner-up v AFC third round (play-off) winner
- OFC final round winner v CONMEBOL round-robin 5th place

The draw for the order in which the two matches were played was held on 31 August 2001 during the FIFA Congress in Zurich, Switzerland.

In each tie, the two teams played a two-legged home-and-away series. The two winners, decided on aggregate score, qualified for the 2002 FIFA World Cup in South Korea and Japan.

== Qualified teams ==
Confederation	Placement	Team
AFC	Third round (play-off) winner	Iran
CONMEBOL	Round-robin 5th place	Uruguay
OFC	Final round winner	Australia
UEFA	First round randomly drawn runner-up	Republic of Ireland

== Matches ==
The first legs were played on 10 and 20 November 2001, and the second legs were played on 15 and 25 November 2001.

=== UEFA v AFC ===
Team 1	Agg.	Team 2	1st leg	2nd leg
Republic of Ireland	2–1	Iran	2–0	0–1

10 November 2001
18:00 UTC±0

Republic of Ireland	2–0	Iran
Harte 44' (pen.); Keane 50'	(Report)

Lansdowne Road, Dublin
Attendance: 36,538
Referee: Antônio Pereira (Brazil)
15 November 2001
17:30 UTC+3:30

Iran	1–0	Republic of Ireland
Golmohammadi 90'	(Report)

Azadi Stadium, Tehran
Attendance: 100,000
Referee: William Mattus (Costa Rica)

Republic of Ireland won 2–1 on aggregate and qualified for the 2002 FIFA World Cup.

=== OFC v CONMEBOL ===
Team 1	Agg.	Team 2	1st leg	2nd leg
Australia	1–3	Uruguay	1–0	0–3

20 November 2001
20:15 UTC+13

Australia	1–0	Uruguay
Muscat 78' (pen.)	(Report)

MCG, Melbourne
Attendance: 84,656
Referee: Graziano Cesari (Italy)
25 November 2001
16:00 UTC−3

Uruguay	3–0	Australia
Silva 14'; Morales 70', 90'	(Report)

Estadio Centenario, Montevideo
Attendance: 62,000
Referee: Ali Bujsaim (United Arab Emirates)

Uruguay won 3–1 on aggregate and qualified for the 2002 FIFA World Cup.

== Goalscorers ==
There were 7 goals scored in 4 matches, for an average of 1.75 goals per match.

2 goals

- (Uruguay) Richard Morales

1 goal

- (Australia) Kevin Muscat
- (Iran) Yahya Golmohammadi
- (Republic of Ireland) Ian Harte
- (Republic of Ireland) Robbie Keane
- (Uruguay) Darío Silva
