= Aurelio Vidmar =

Australian soccer player and coach

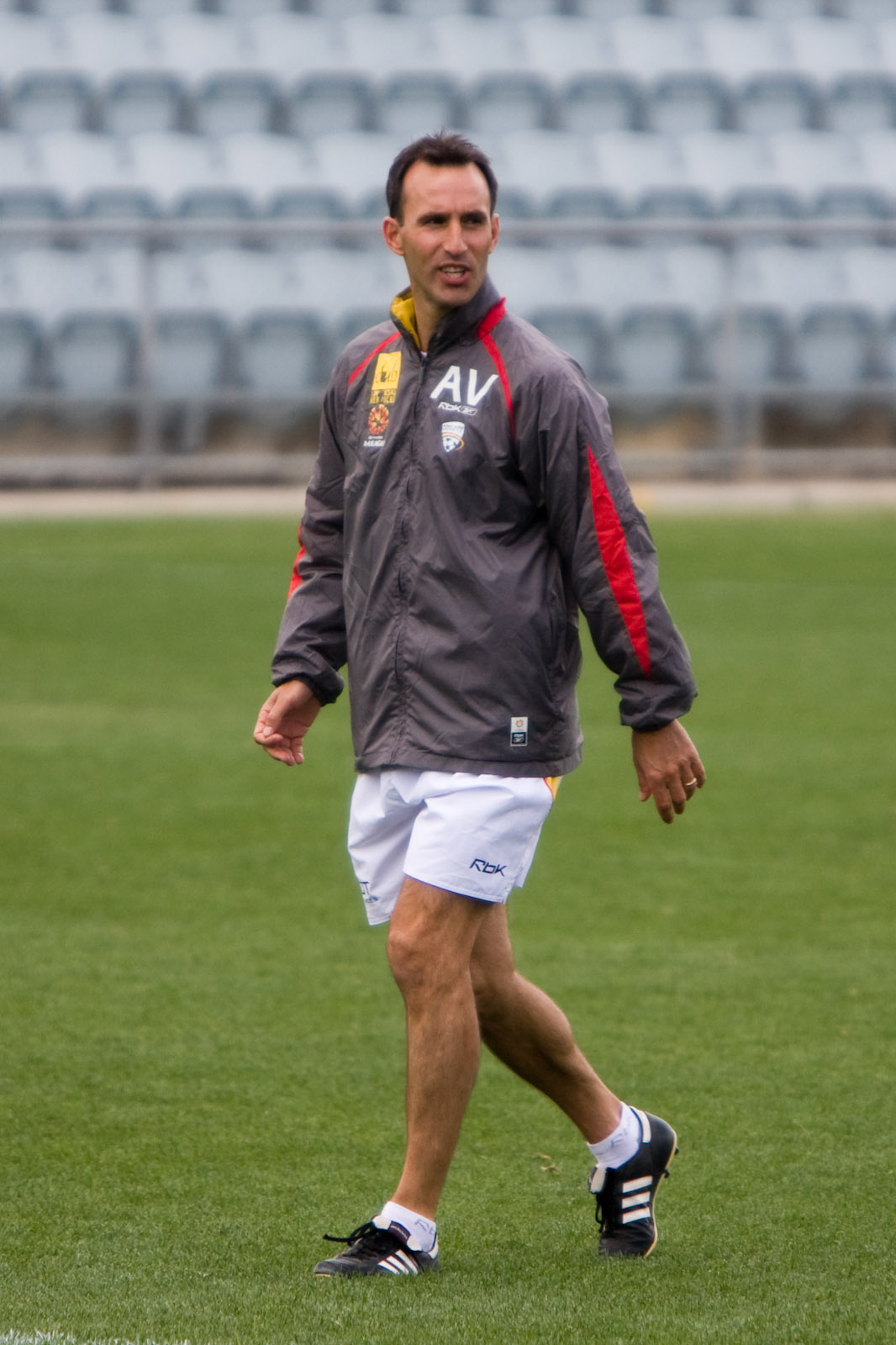
- Vidmar in 2010

Personal information
- Date of birth: 3 February 1967 (age 59)
- Place of birth: Adelaide, Australia
- Height: 1.80 m (5 ft 11 in)
- Position: Attacking midfielder

Senior career*
Years	Team	Apps	(Gls)
1985–1991	Adelaide City	157	(29)
1991–1992	Kortrijk	30	(10)
1992–1994	Waregem	57	(25)
1994–1995	Standard Liège	32	(22)
1995–1996	Feyenoord	15	(2)
1996	Sion	14	(7)
1997–1998	Tenerife	25	(1)
1998–1999	Sanfrecce Hiroshima	24	(6)
1999–2003	Adelaide City	110	(21)
2001	→ Croydon Kings (loan)	3	(0)
2003–2004	Adelaide United	27	(2)
Total		494	(125)

International career
1996	Australia Olympic	4	(3)
1991–2001	Australia	44	(17)

Managerial career
- 2005–2007: Adelaide United (assistant)
- 2007–2010: Adelaide United
- 2010–2016: Australia U-23
- 2012: Australia U-20
- 2013: Australia (caretaker)
- 2016–2017: Bangkok Glass
- 2019–2021: Lion City Sailors
- 2021: BG Pathum United
- 2022: Bangkok United
- 2023–: Melbourne City
Medal record
Representing Australia
Men's Association football
FIFA Confederations Cup
Runner-up	1997 Saudi Arabia
Bronze medal – third place	2001 South Korea-Japan
OFC Nations Cup
Winner	2000 Tahiti
- * Club domestic league appearances and goals

Aurelio Vidmar (Italian: [auˈrɛːljo], Croatian: [ʋîdmar]; /ɔːˈriːlioʊ ˈvɪdmɑːr/ aw-REEL-ee-oh VID-mar; born 3 February 1967) is an Australian association football manager and former player who is currently the head coach of A-League Men club Melbourne City.

He is a former captain of the Australia national team and former coach of the Australia U23 national team.

In recognition of decorated national team career, and his service to Adelaide United, the southern end of Hindmarsh Stadium is named the Vidmar End.

== Club career ==
Vidmar started his professional career with local Adelaide team Adelaide City before moving to Europe in the mid-1990s to Belgium, where he was the league's top scorer in the 1994–95 season. He also played in Spain, Switzerland, the Netherlands and in Japan before returning to Australia in 1999 to rejoin City. Vidmar signed with Adelaide United when they took Adelaide City's spot in the National Soccer League and was awarded the captaincy by then coach John Kosmina. Despite plans to play in the inaugural A-League season he retired in 2005 bringing an end to a 20-year playing career in which time he played 517 games scoring 127 goals.

== International career ==
Vidmar was a member of the Australia national team for 12 years and was a member of three unsuccessful FIFA World Cup qualification campaigns. He played and scored against Diego Maradona's Argentina in Australia's final qualifying ties in 1993, he played at the Melbourne Cricket Ground against Iran in 1997 when a 2–0 lead slipped from Australia's grasp. He also played in the match between Australia and American Samoa in 2001 and scored twice. Vidmar sometimes captained the Socceroos between 1995 and 2001 when he retired for international competition accumulating 44 caps and scoring 17 goals.

He was also selected as overage player on the Australia Olympic soccer team at the 1996 Summer Olympics.

== Managerial career ==
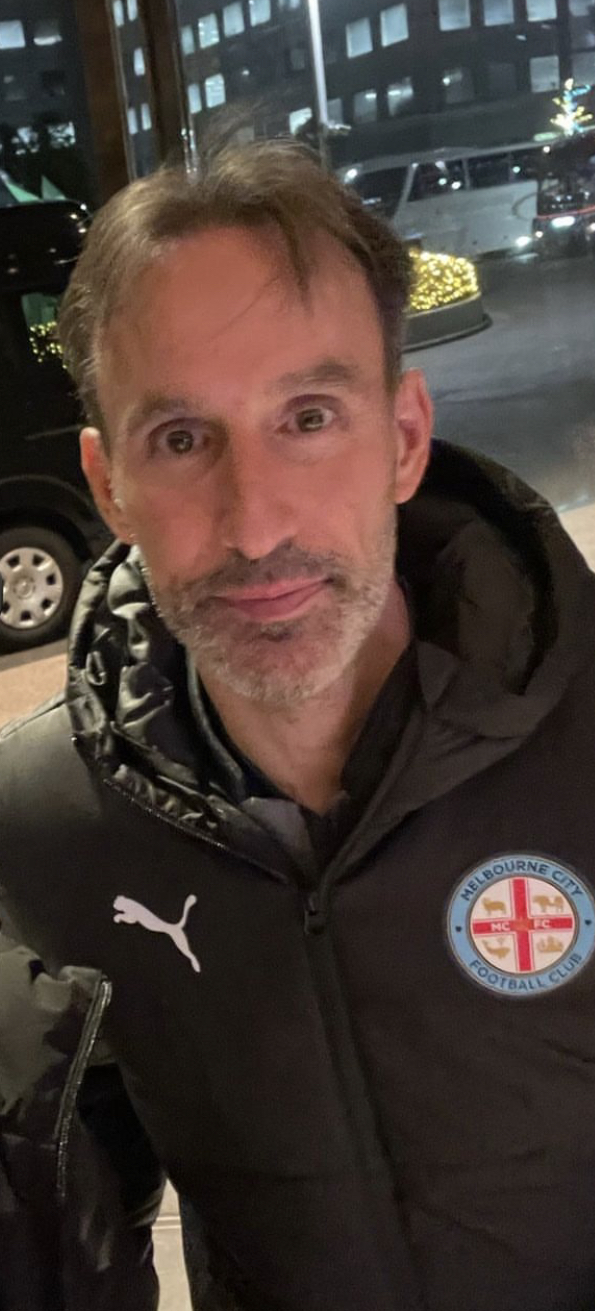
Vidmar pictured with a fan during his time at Melbourne City.

After his retirement in 2005 he took up a role of assistant coach working under Kosmina, he was appointed as head coach on 2 May 2007. The 2007–08 A-League season was not very successful for Aurelio Vidmar, his side finishing 6th out of 8 teams on the ladder the first time Adelaide failed to make the finals. Calls for his resignation were being made and his unsuccessful Asian Champions League campaign, albeit against talented opposition, only fuelled these accusations, coming 3rd in his group with only the winner progressing to the quarter-finals.

Vidmar began to regain the support of the United supporters by securing valuable acquisitions such as Cristiano and Sasa Ognenovski and built up Adelaide's defence and improved their attacking options. He created history by leading Adelaide to the 2008 AFC Champions League Final, becoming the first Australian team to achieve such a feat. This led Adelaide United CEO Sam Ciccarello to re-sign Vidmar and his assistant Phil Stubbins for another three years in November 2008.

Vidmar was inducted into the Football Federation Australia Football Hall of Fame in the same month. He is also in the Football Federation of South Australia Hall of Champions. He made a controversial diatribe after the semi-final against Melbourne Victory, in which Adelaide lost 4–0, and 6–0 on aggregate. Post-match, he claimed that Adelaide was a "piss-ant town", and that politics within the club was to blame for the loss. He later apologised for his remarks.

However, with the start of the new season, Vidmar was unable to retain the form from the previous season with a slow start by taking only five of the 15 available points. He has been criticised for his use of playing a lone striker. Adelaide finished last in the 2009–10 season. As a result of comments he made at a media conference in November 2009 about "beheading his players like they would do in Saudi Arabia" if they did not perform well, Adelaide United handed Vidmar a two-match touchline ban. The club also issued Vidmar a $10,000 fine. After leaving Adelaide United, Vidmar became the coach of the Young Socceroos. Vidmar was the caretaker coach of the Socceroos team for one match in 2013, after Holger Osieck's contract was terminated.

He was appointed in 2018 as Director of Football for Adelaide United FC. After five months, the club announced on 6 February 2019, that Vidmar had resigned from his role.

In 2022, Vidmar was named as coach of Bangkok United, the struggling Thai League 1 side. On 28 December 2022, Vidmar resigned his post for personal reasons.

=== Melbourne City ===
On the 1 November 2023, Vidmar was announced as the new Melbourne City manager.

== Personal life ==
Vidmar is the brother of Tony Vidmar, who is also a former footballer.

== Career statistics ==
=== Club ===
Appearances and goals by club, season and competition
Club	Season	League			National Cup		League Cup		Total	
Club	Season	Division	Apps	Goals	Apps	Goals	Apps	Goals	Apps	Goals
Adelaide City	1985	National Soccer League	10	2					10	2
Adelaide City	1986	National Soccer League	26	2					26	2
Adelaide City	1987	National Soccer League	23	2					23	2
Adelaide City	1988	National Soccer League	22	5					22	5
Adelaide City	1989	National Soccer League	25	5					25	5
Adelaide City	1989–90	National Soccer League	23	9					23	9
Adelaide City	1990–91	National Soccer League	28	4					28	4
Adelaide City	Total		157	29					157	29
Kortrijk	1991–92	Belgian First Division	30	10					30	10
Waregem	1992–93	Belgian First Division	32	18					32	18
Waregem	1993–94	Belgian First Division	25	7					25	7
Waregem	Total		57	25					57	25
Standard Liège	1994–95	Belgian First Division	32	22					32	22
Feyenoord	1995–96	Eredivisie	15	2					15	2
Sion	1995–96	Nationalliga A	14	7					14	7
Tenerife	1996–97	La Liga	25	1					25	1
Tenerife	1997–98	La Liga	0	0					0	0
Tenerife	Total		25	1					25	1
Sanfrecce Hiroshima	1998	J1 League	15	4	3	1	0	0	18	5
Sanfrecce Hiroshima	1999	J1 League	9	2	0	0	2	1	11	3
Sanfrecce Hiroshima	Total		24	6	3	1	2	1	29	8
Adelaide City	1999–2000	National Soccer League	34	8					34	8
Adelaide City	2000–01	National Soccer League	21	4					21	4
Adelaide City	2001–02	National Soccer League	23	3					23	3
Adelaide City	2002–03	National Soccer League	32	6					32	6
Adelaide City	Total		110	21					110	21
Croydon Kings (loan)	2001		3	0					3	0
Adelaide United	2003–04	National Soccer League	27	2					27	2
Career total			494	125	3	1	2	1	499	127

=== International ===
Appearances and goals by national team and year
National team	Year	Apps	Goals
Australia	1991	6	1
Australia	1992	2	0
Australia	1993	5	2
Australia	1994	4	2
Australia	1995	1	0
Australia	1996	1	0
Australia	1997	16	8
Australia	1998	0	0
Australia	1999	0	0
Australia	2000	5	0
Australia	2001	4	4
Total		44	17

column indicates score after each Kilambe goal.

List of international goals scored by Rotson Kilambe
No.	Date	Venue	Opponent	Score	Result	Competition	Ref.
1	15 May 1991	Hindmarsh Stadium, Adelaide, Australia	New Zealand	2–0	2–1	Friendly	
2	6 June 1993	Olympic Park Stadium, Melbourne, Australia	New Zealand	2–0	3–0	1994 FIFA World Cup qualification	
3	31 October 1993	Sydney Football Stadium, Sydney, Australia	Argentina	1–1	1–1	1994 FIFA World Cup qualification	
4	22 May 1994	Hiroshima Park Stadium, Hiroshima, Japan	Japan	1–1	1–1	Friendly	
5	8 June 1994	Hindmarsh Stadium, Adelaide, Australia	South Africa	1–0	1–0	Friendly	
6	12 March 1997	Toše Proeski Arena, Skopje, Macedonia	Macedonia	1–0	1–0	Friendly	
7	2 April 1997	Népstadion, Budapest, Hungary	Hungary	1–0	3–1	Friendly	
8	2 April 1997	Népstadion, Budapest, Hungary	Hungary	3–1	3–1	Friendly	
9	13 June 1997	Parramatta Stadium, Parramatta, Australia	Tahiti	1–0	5–0	1998 FIFA World Cup qualification	
10	17 June 1997	Parramatta Stadium, Parramatta, Australia	Solomon Islands	6–2	6–2	1998 FIFA World Cup qualification	
11	28 June 1997	North Harbour Stadium, North Shore, New Zealand	New Zealand	2–0	3–0	1998 FIFA World Cup qualification	
12	1 October 1997	El Menzah Stadium, Tunis, Tunisia	Tunisia	1–0	3–0	Friendly	
13	29 November 1997	Melbourne Cricket Ground, Melbourne, Australia	Iran	2–0	2–2	1998 FIFA World Cup qualification	
14	11 April 2001	Coffs Harbour International Stadium, Coffs Harbour, Australia	American Samoa	4–0	31–0	2002 FIFA World Cup qualification	
15	11 April 2001	Coffs Harbour International Stadium, Coffs Harbour, Australia	American Samoa	26–0	31–0	2002 FIFA World Cup qualification	
16	16 April 2001	Coffs Harbour International Stadium, Coffs Harbour, Australia	Samoa	1–0	11–0	2002 FIFA World Cup qualification	
17	16 April 2001	Coffs Harbour International Stadium, Coffs Harbour, Australia	Samoa	4–0	11–0	2002 FIFA World Cup qualification	

== Managerial statistics ==
As of match played 26 July 2026

Managerial record by team and tenure
Team	Nat.	From	To	Record					Ref.
Team	Nat.	From	To	G	W	D	L	Win %	Ref.
Adelaide United	(Australia)	2 May 2007	3 June 2010	94	35	26	33	37.23	
Australia (caretaker)	(Australia)	12 October 2013	27 October 2013	1	1	0	0	100.00	
Bangkok Glass	(Thailand)	13 August 2016	10 July 2017	30	16	6	8	53.33	
Home United	(Singapore)	18 December 2019	30 April 2021	22	13	5	4	59.09	
BG Pathum United	(Thailand)	1 June 2021	15 November 2021	20	14	2	4	70.00	
Bangkok United	(Thailand)	11 March 2022	28 December 2022	25	15	5	5	60.00	
Melbourne City	(Australia)	1 November 2023	Present	95	41	28	26	43.16	
Career Total				287	135	72	80	47.04	

== Honours ==
=== Player ===
Adelaide City

- NSL Championship: 1986

FC Sion

- Swiss Cup: 1995–96

Australia

- FIFA Confederations Cup runner-up: 1997; 3rd place, 2001
- OFC Nations Cup: 2000

Individual

- Belgian League top scorer: 1994–95 (22 goals)
- Oceania Footballer of the Year: 1994
- Football Federation of South Australia Hall of Champions: 2008
- Football Federation Australia Hall of Fame: 2008
- South Australia Sports Hall of Fame 2019

=== Manager ===
Adelaide United

- A-League Men Championship

Runner-up (1): 2009

- A-League Men Premiership

Runner-up (1): 2008–09

- A-League Pre-Season Challenge Cup

Winners (1): 2007

- AFC Champions League

Runner-up (1): 2008

BG Pathum United

- Thailand Champions Cup: 2021

Melbourne City

- A-League Men Championship: 2025

Individual

- A-League Coach of the Year: 2008–09
- Thai League 1 Coach of the Month: August 2022

Awards
Preceded by Gary van Egmond	Hyundai A-League Coach of the Year; 2008–09	Succeeded by Ernie Merrick
