= Vivian Wickham =

Personal information
- Full name: Vivian Wickham
- Date of birth: 12 June 1982 (age 44)
- Place of birth: Solomon Islands
- Position: Midfielder

Senior career*
Years	Team	Apps	(Gls)
2001–2002	Toowoomba Raiders		
2002–2003	Central United		
2004	Mangere United		

International career
2001	Solomon Islands	7	(2)
2006	Solomon Islands beach soccer	3	(0)

Managerial career
- 2006: Solomon Islands beach soccer
Medal record
Men's football
Representing Solomon Islands
OFC Nations Cup
Third place	2000 Tahiti
- * Club domestic league appearances and goals

Vivian Wickham (born 12 June 1982) is a former association footballer from the Solomon Islands. He spent his club career in Australia and New Zealand, also playing seven times for the Solomon Islands national football team. Wickham played as a midfielder and also played beach soccer for his country at the 2006 FIFA Beach Soccer World Cup.

== Club career ==
First playing for an Australian club in 2001, Wickham spent two years at the recently formed Toowoomba Raiders FC, based in Queensland. From there, he moved to New Zealand club Central United, a bigger club then playing in the Northern Premier League. After playing for United in 2002 and 2003, Wickham signed for Mangere United, also based in Auckland, ahead of the 2004 season.

== International career ==
Wickham made his debut for the Solomon Islands in a 9–1 win over the Cook Islands on 4 June 2001 in a 2002 FIFA World Cup qualifier. He played in three more qualifiers in June, against Vanuatu, New Zealand and Tahiti. He scored twice in the space of thirty minutes in the 7–2 win over Vanuatu on 8 June. These were the only goals of his international career. In 2002, he played in OFC Nations Cup losses against New Zealand and Tahiti as well as a 0–0 draw with Papua New Guinea.

== Beach soccer ==
In November 2006, Wickham played for the Solomon Islands national beach soccer team at the 2006 FIFA Beach Soccer World Cup, held in Rio de Janeiro, Brazil. Wickham made his debut in the competition in the 5–2 win over Cameroon on 2 November. He then played in the losses to Portugal and Uruguay as Solomon Islands were eliminated in the first stage.

== After retirement ==
Since ending his playing career, Wickham has coached the Solomon Islands beach soccer team, nicknamed the Bilikiki. After the 2006 Beach Soccer World Cup, Wickham became the marketing manager of the Solomon Islands Football Federation, also holding the position of Business Development Executive in the Solomon Islands Tobacco Company. He has since become the marketing manager of Solomon Airlines, acquiring this position in February 2010. This role has included presenting both the Solomon Islands beach soccer and under-17 football teams with sets of shirts.

== Honours ==
Solomon Islands

- OFC Nations Cup: 3rd place 2000
