= Shalendra Lal =

Fijian footballer and coach

Personal information
- Full name: Shalendra Lal
- Date of birth: 3 July 1983 (age 43)
- Place of birth: Ba, Fiji
- Position: Left-back

Senior career*
Years	Team	Apps	(Gls)
- Ba FC
Medal record
Men's football
Representing Fiji
OFC Nations Cup
Third place	2008 Oceania
- * Club domestic league appearances and goals

Shalendra Lal (born 3 July 1983) is a former Fijian footballer who played as a left-back. He is the current head coach of the Fiji national under-17 football team.

== Club career ==
He started his football career with DAV College and spent 13 years with Ba FC. In January 2015, he was appointed coach of Ba. In January 2021 he was appointed coach of Nadi F.C. He resigned from the position in November 2021.

== Managerial career ==
In 2014, he served as assistant coach of the Fiji national under-20 football team and was then appointed as the under-17 head coach.

== Honours ==
Fiji

- OFC Nations Cup: 3rd place, 2008
