= David Firisua =

Solomon Islands footballer

Personal information
- Date of birth: 12 July 1981 (age 45)
- Place of birth: Honiara, Solomon Islands
- Position: Defender

Team information
- Current team: Central United
- Number: 28

Youth career
- 1999: Fo'odono Orange
- 2000: Mangere United

Senior career*
Years	Team	Apps	(Gls)
2001–2002	Laugu FC United	?	(?)
2003–?	Central United		

International career
2001–2002	Solomon Islands	5	(1)
Medal record
Men's football
Representing Solomon Islands
OFC Nations Cup
Third place	2000 Tahiti
- * Club domestic league appearances and goals

David Firisua (born July 12, 1981) is a former Solomon Islands professional footballer. He is currently team manager for Auckland City FC.

== Career ==
Firisua began his professional career with Laugu FC United in the Solomon Islands and joined in the winter of 2003 New Zealand club Central United.

=== Clubs ===
- Laugu FC United 2002
- Central United 2003–?

== International career ==
He was also a member of Solomon Islands national football team from 2001.

== Honours ==
Solomon Islands

- OFC Nations Cup: 3rd place 2000
