= David Zdrilic =

Australian soccer player and coach (born 1974)

David Zdrilić
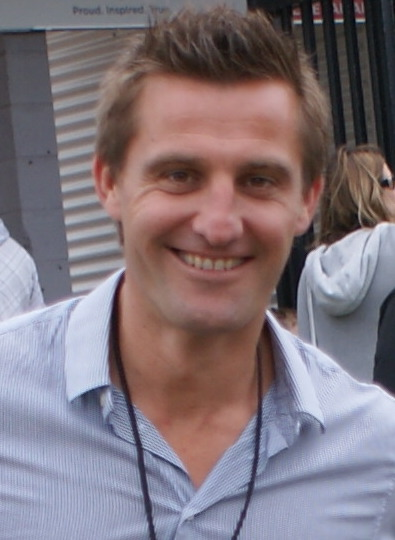
- Zdrilic in 2011

Personal information
- Full name: David Allen Zdrilić
- Date of birth: 13 April 1974 (age 52)
- Place of birth: Sydney, Australia
- Height: 1.82 m (6 ft 0 in)
- Position: Forward

Team information
- Current team: Zhejiang FC (assistant coach)

Youth career
- Greenwich
- King Tomislav Sydney
- Patrician Brothers' College
- Sutherland Sharks
- –1993: St George Saints

Senior career*
Years	Team	Apps	(Gls)
1993	St George Saints	20	(8)
1993–1997	Sydney United	114	(39)
1997–1998	Aarau	25	(2)
1998–2000	SSV Ulm	55	(18)
2000–2002	SpVgg Unterhaching	23	(1)
2002–2003	Walsall	24	(5)
2003–2004	Aberdeen	31	(8)
2004	Eintracht Trier	11	(0)
2005–2008	Sydney FC	59	(5)
2009–2010	Sydney United	33	(9)
Total		395	(95)

International career
1997–2005	Australia	30	(20)
2013	Australia (beach soccer)	11	(21)

Managerial career
- 2009–2010: Maccabi Hakoah
- 2010–2011: Sydney United
- 2016–2017: Sydney FC U20
- 2023: Sydney FC (interim)
- 2024–2025: Perth Glory
- 2026–: Zhejiang FC (assistant)
Medal record
Representing Australia
Men's Association football
FIFA Confederations Cup
Third place	2001 South Korea-Japan
OFC Nations Cup
Winner	2000 Tahiti
Winner	2004 Australia
AFC–OFC Challenge Cup
Runner-up	2001 Japan
- * Club domestic league appearances and goals

David Allen Zdrilić (Croatian: [ˈzdrilitɕ]; born 13 April 1974) is an Australian soccer coach and former player, who is the assistant coach of Chinese Super League club Zhejiang FC. Zdrilic has also been a football presenter on the Special Broadcasting Service (SBS), including in their coverage of the 2018 FIFA World Cup in Russia.

Zdrilic played on 30 occasions for the Australia national soccer team, having once scored eight goals in a single match – the second highest recorded for any Australian player, behind Socceroos teammate Archie Thompson, who scored 13 goals in the same game. He was also a member of the Australia national beach soccer team, the Beach Socceroos, having captained the side. He previously played for Sydney FC in the A-League after forging a professional career in Switzerland, Germany, England and Scotland.

As a football presenter on the Special Broadcasting Service (SBS), Zdrilic hosted the 2014 FIFA World Cup in Brazil which won a Logie Award for Most Outstanding Sport Coverage as well as SBS's Friday Night A-League coverage. He has hosted games from the UEFA Champions League, Europa League, various international cup competitions and the football entertainment show Thursday FC on SBS2.

Over the last few years, Zdrilic served in a variety of coaching roles in Germany, Belgium, Italy, the MLS and the A-League. In early 2022, he became an assistant at Serie A club Genoa - the first Australian to coach in Serie A - after turning down the offer of coaching Australia at the 2024 Olympic Games.

== Playing career ==
=== Early years ===
Zdrilic attended Patrician Brothers' College, Fairfield and St Patrick's College, Sutherland. During his time as a teenage schoolboy he featured prominently in all teams including the A Grade squad. He had the opportunity as a child to pursue a tennis career, receiving coaching and playing in tournaments, but chose football instead. After playing through the youth ranks for St George Saints he broke into the senior side in 1993 at the age of 19. Mid-way through the NSW Super League year he signed to Sydney United for the coming National Soccer League season. He made an immediate impact shortly after joining the club, scoring four goals in four games in a preseason cup competition. However, he played most of his first NSL season playing as fullback, netting only once for the year. Zdrilic's versatility meant he was often used in different positions and during the 1994/95 and 1995/96 seasons, he was more often among the goal scorers. It was in the 1996/97 season that for the first time Zdrilic was used as an out and out striker and eventually took out the Golden Boot scoring 21 goals in 26 games. During this time he combined studying a law degree at Sydney University and working full-time at a Western Sydney Law Firm with his footballing duties. It was not until this 1996/97 NSL season that his footballing career rose to the next level.

Zdrilic's first call-up to the national team came in January 1997. After the appointment of Terry Venables as the new Socceroos coach, Australia hosted the Optus Cup, a four-team tournament including an Australian squad of domestic-based players. In forming the squad, Venables had asked "who's the leading scorer in the NSL?", the answer being Zdrilic (having scored 12 goals in as many games), and he played all three matches. He continued his scoring ways in the NSL to win the Golden Boot for that season with 21 goals, United topping the table before losing the grand final to Brisbane.

=== In Europe ===
His position atop the Australian league attracted attention in Europe, particularly in Switzerland with an offer to join Grasshoppers accepted, where he would initially be loaned out to Aarau. After one season at Aarau, he moved to German side SSV Ulm 1846, newly promoted to the second division. Ulm's strong 1998–99 season with Zdrilic a regular starter and scoring 12 goals for the season saw them promoted again into the Bundesliga, the club's first appearance in the top flight.

Now playing in a top European league, he earned a recall to national side in early 2000 for a tournament in Chile. Zdrilic was injured as a result of a bad tackle in the final minutes of Australia's game against Bulgaria and he returned to Ulm injured. He again rejoined the side in June as Australia hosted a three match series against Paraguay, which he scored his first international goal in a 2–1 win. Zdrilic remained with the side for the 2000 OFC Nations Cup, adding to his goal tally twice against Cook Islands.

Returning to club duties, with Zdrilic out injured for much of the season due to the knee injury he sustained on international duty, Ulm had been relegated back to the second division and Zdrilic sought to remain in the top league. Despite the injury Zdrilic scored 6 goals in 13 Bundesliga starts for Ulm and moved to SpVgg Unterhaching. The club struggled for consistency through the 2000–01 season and was eventually relegated, Zdrilic remaining with the club on its return to 2. Bundesliga. Haching continued to struggle for results in the 2001–02 season, relegated again at the end of the year. In contrast to club fortunes, Zdrilic was achieving greater success at international level throughout this time. Becoming a regular inclusion in an Australian side under Frank Farina, he was recalled for a friendly against Scotland to replace the injured Mark Viduka scoring in a memorable 2–0 victory at Hamden Park. He retained his place in the squad for the Oceania World Cup qualifiers. In Australia's second match of the tournament, he scored eight goals in a world record 31–0 win over American Samoa. He and his strike partner Archie Thompson, who scored 13 goals, broke the record for most goals scored in a senior international match. He remained in the team for the 2001 FIFA Confederations Cup, taking part in the Socceroos memorable victories over Mexico and Brazil.

With Unterhaching in financial trouble, Zdrilic gained a release and signed on to English First Division side Walsall, where he was soon joined by fellow Australian Steve Corica. In a season restricted by a calf injury, he made 29 appearances in the league and cup scoring five goals including the only goal against Wimbledon in the FA Cup fourth round. In May 2003 he parted from the club and after interest from other English sides and Norwegian side Brann, he signed to Scottish Premier League club Aberdeen on a one-year deal, making an immediate impact with a goal 80 seconds into his debut in a pre-season friendly against Liverpool, and then again against Rangers in the league. Zdrilic went on to score eight goals in all competitions, including the winner in a memorable win over Celtic, which ended Celtic's unbeaten home run of 78 games. After being linked with Belgian clubs Lierse and Gent, as well as 1860 Munich, he returned to 2. Bundesliga with Eintracht Trier.

While facing difficulties at Aberdeen, his elevation back to the top flight of a European league returned him to national team contention. He was selected for a number of friendly matches and rejoined the squad in May for the 2004 OFC Nations Cup, which also doubled as qualifiers for the 2006 FIFA World Cup. After a goal against Tahiti, he made two more appearances against Fiji and Vanuatu.

=== Return to Australia ===
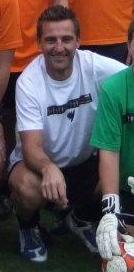
Zdrilic in 2011

His stay at Trier was short-lived, and returned to Australia with the launch of the A-League in 2005 to be part of the inaugural Sydney FC squad, signing a three-year deal. Now back in Australia, he was included in a Socceroos side for a match on 29 March 2005 against Indonesia to benefit victims of the Boxing Day tsunami, scoring Australia's third goal in what many have tipped as his last international match. He took part in 19 of Sydney's matches in their first season, mostly as a substitute, scoring once. In the second season he found more game time under Terry Butcher, scoring four goals from 20 appearances.

Zdrilic remained at Sydney for the A-League 2007–08 season. In the final year of his original three-year contract, a number of matches saw him being deployed in the backline and midfield. Many Sydney FC fans became critical of his performances, after netting just five goals in his first two years at the club. Despite his clear intentions to add to his tally in the 2007–08 season, Zdrilic failed to score in any competitive matches all year and was released by Sydney at the end of the season. The end of his stay with Sydney FC effectively marked the end of his career.

In 2009, Zdrilic was approached by former teammate Ante Milicic to sign with his first professional club Sydney United, who play in the NSW Premier League. The team finished on the top of the table in the regular season but bowed out in semi-final. Zdrilic finished the season with eight goals and announced his decision to retire after 15 years as a professional footballer.

== Post-playing career ==
=== Coaching ===
While playing at Sydney United, Zdrilic took up his first coaching role coaching with former NSL champions, Hakoah Sydney City East. In his maiden season as manager, Zdrilic guided the side to a semi-final berth, but declined the club's offer to extend his contract for a second season.

The departure of Ante Milicic to A-League expansion club Melbourne Heart opened the opportunity for Zdrilic to become the player/manager at Sydney United. He spent one season in charge of the club before announcing his retirement as a player.

Despite enjoying more success as manager – taking United deep into the finals series in his first season at Edensor Park – Zdrilic left the club to concentrate on his growing media career. He was succeeded at the club by Jean-Paul de Marigny, returning for his second stint in charge.

Whilst away from the dugout, Zdrilic undertook a succession of coaching study tours in Europe, spending time at clubs such Bayern Munich, TSG Hoffenheim, Hajduk Split and Dinamo Zagreb.

In 2015, Zdrilic returned to the coaching ranks after being approached by Sydney FC to become the assistant coach of both the NSW NPL2 first team, NYL team and the under-20 side. Both sides won their respective leagues in August 2016, meaning the club will participate in the New South Wales NPL1 in 2017 for the first time. The following season saw Zdrilic take over the NPL1 U20 side as head coach whilst still remaining assistant coach to Robbie Stanton's NPL1 first team.

In July 2017, he accepted an offer from reigning Bundesliga runners-up RB Leipzig to become the assistant coach of the club's under-17 team, currently led by former VfB Stuttgart and TSG Hoffenheim striker Alexander Blessin. After a successful year with the U17s, the pair moved up to the U19s which is the club's reserve team feeding directly into the club's 1st team Bundesliga side.

"I spent a month at RB Leipzig last year on a study tour watching how they did things as well as learning from Ralf Rangnick and the other coaches," Zdrilic said. "I highlighted that I would like the opportunity to one day move over to Europe to coach. They were aware of my role with Sydney FC and my previous coaching and playing experience which played a big part in Leipzig offering me the position."

In January 2020, Zdrilic accepted an offer from Chicago Fire to become the assistant coach, where was credited with reforming the team's approach into a more pressing-oriented style.

Zdrilic was linked with a move to then-English Premier League club Sheffield United, but ultimately stayed with Chicago.

In mid-2021, Zdrilic returned to Europe after accepting an offer to reunite with Alexander Blessin - who he coached under at RB Leipzig - to become the assistant coach at Belgian side Oostende.

After impressing with their high-tempo style in Belgium, Blessin and Zdrilic were then poached by Italian Serie A club Genoa in January 2022, replacing the outgoing Andriy Shevchenko. The move made Zdrilic the first Australian to hold a coaching position at a Serie A side.

In August 2023, he returned to Sydney FC, re-joining the club as an assistant coach to Steve Corica.

In June 2024, Zdrilic was announced as the new head coach of A-League club Perth Glory. In October 2025, Zdrilic was relieved of his duties with immediate effect.

On 10 January 2026, Zdrilic was announced as the new assistant coach of Chinese Super League club Zhejiang FC.

=== Media ===
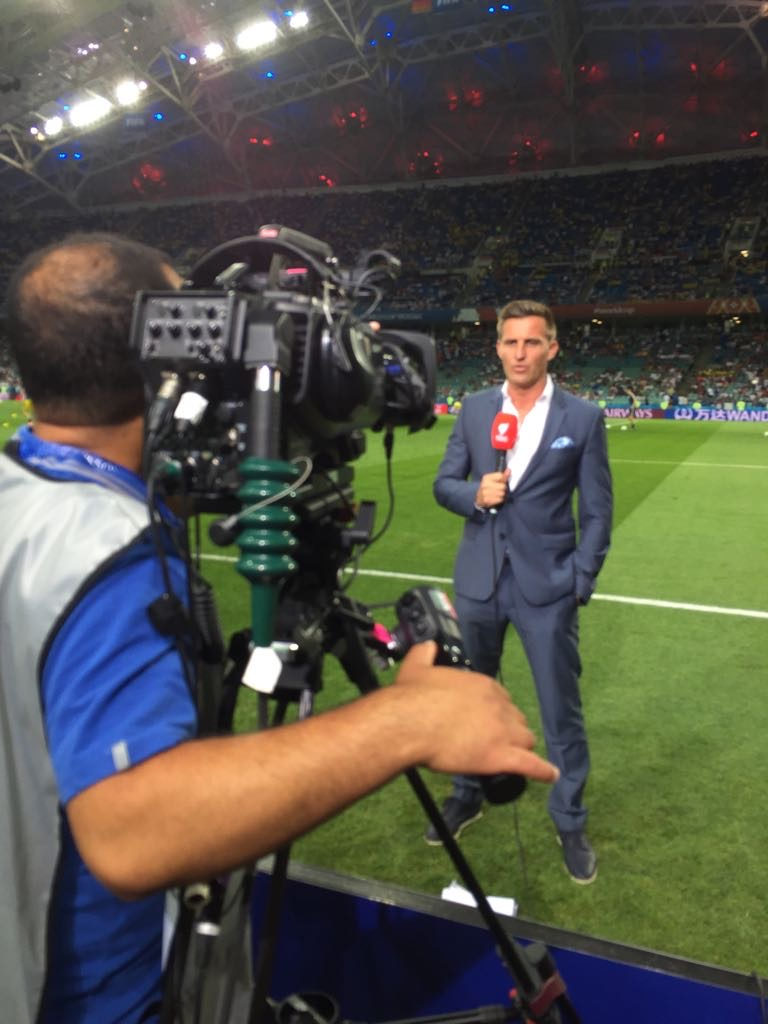
Zdrilic in 2018

After being released from Sydney FC, Zdrilic started working as a football pundit for both Fox Sports and ESPN, as well as featuring on SBS and writing a column for mX. He also took on a role as Player Relations Officer for Professional Footballers Australia.

Zdrilic continued to work in the media and co-hosted the now-discontinued World Football News on One, and was a core part of the 2010 FIFA World Cup coverage on SBS, appearing regularly as an analyst. He then joined SBS exclusively, which sees him continuing his analytical role, as well as co-hosting the football entertainment show Thursday FC.

Zdrilic soon moved into the hosting role full-time and began presenting the UEFA Champions League, Europa League and International Cup Competitions. He then hosted the 2014 FIFA World Cup in Brazil which won a Logie for Most Outstanding Sports Coverage. He was also the host of SBS's 4-year coverage of the A-League between 2014 and 2017.

In 2018, Zdrilic was again a key figure in SBS's coverage of the 2018 FIFA World Cup in Russia where he presented live from matches around the country as well as expert analysis alongside Craig Foster and Lucy Zelic from SBS's Moscow studio.

=== Beach Soccer ===
Since retiring, Zdrilic is a keen advocate for Beach Soccer and is a member of the Beach Socceroos. He has also captained the side. The Beach Socceroos travelled to Qatar in January 2013 for the Beach Soccer World Cup Qualifiers. Despite having no lead up practice matches and never before played together as a team, the Beach Socceroos narrowly missed out on a World Cup place finishing 4th out of 16 teams, only three World Cup spots were on offer. Zdrilic finished the tournament with 4 goals in 4 games. Zdrilic is an Ambassador for one of the country's biggest International Tournaments, the Australia Beach Soccer Cup, played annually in Wollongong. In the last tournament, Zdrilic scored 8 goals in 3 games including 6 goals in a 7–5 win over China. Australia won the tournament.

== Career statistics ==
=== Club ===
Appearances and goals by club, season and competition
Club	Season	League (Note: A-League statistics include final series matches)			Cup		Continental (Note: All appearance(s) in O-League or AFC Champions League)		Other (Note: Includes the OFC Club Championship Qualifying Tournament, A-League Pre-Season Challenge Cup, and FIFA Club World Cup)		Total	
Club	Season	Division	Apps	Goals	Apps	Goals	Apps	Goals	Apps	Goals	Apps	Goals
Sydney FC	2005–06	A-League	19	1	—		5	9	6	0	30	10
Sydney FC	2006–07	A-League	20	4	—		6	0	5	0	31	4
Sydney FC	2007–08	A-League	12	0	—		—		5	0	17	0
Sydney FC	Total		51	5	—		11	9	16	0	78	14

=== International ===
Scores and results list Australia's goal tally first, score column indicates score after each Zdrilic goal.

List of international goals scored by David Zdrilic
No.	Date	Venue	Opponent	Score	Result	Competition
1	15 June 2000	Olympic Park Stadium, Melbourne, Australia	Paraguay	2–0	2–1	Friendly
2	19 June 2000	Stade Pater, Papeete, Tahiti	Cook Islands	5–0	17–0	2000 OFC Nations Cup
3	19 June 2000	Stade Pater, Papeete, Tahiti	Cook Islands	11–0	17–0	2000 OFC Nations Cup
4	15 November 2000	Hampden Park, Glasgow, Scotland	Scotland	2–0	2–0	Friendly
5	9 April 2001	BCU International Stadium, Coffs Harbour, Australia	Tonga	17–0	22–0	2002 FIFA World Cup qualification
6	9 April 2001	BCU International Stadium, Coffs Harbour, Australia	Tonga	22–0	22–0	2002 FIFA World Cup qualification
7	11 April 2001	BCU International Stadium, Coffs Harbour, Australia	American Samoa	3–0	31–0	2002 FIFA World Cup qualification
8	11 April 2001	BCU International Stadium, Coffs Harbour, Australia	American Samoa	7–0	31–0	2002 FIFA World Cup qualification
9	11 April 2001	BCU International Stadium, Coffs Harbour, Australia	American Samoa	9–0	31–0	2002 FIFA World Cup qualification
10	11 April 2001	BCU International Stadium, Coffs Harbour, Australia	American Samoa	13–0	31–0	2002 FIFA World Cup qualification
11	11 April 2001	BCU International Stadium, Coffs Harbour, Australia	American Samoa	21–0	31–0	2002 FIFA World Cup qualification
12	11 April 2001	BCU International Stadium, Coffs Harbour, Australia	American Samoa	24–0	31–0	2002 FIFA World Cup qualification
13	11 April 2001	BCU International Stadium, Coffs Harbour, Australia	American Samoa	25–0	31–0	2002 FIFA World Cup qualification
14	11 April 2001	BCU International Stadium, Coffs Harbour, Australia	American Samoa	31–0	31–0	2002 FIFA World Cup qualification
15	16 April 2001	BCU International Stadium, Coffs Harbour, Australia	Samoa	2–0	11–0	2002 FIFA World Cup qualification
16	16 April 2001	BCU International Stadium, Coffs Harbour, Australia	Samoa	6–0	11–0	2002 FIFA World Cup qualification
17	24 June 2001	Stadium Australia, Sydney	New Zealand	1–0	4–1	2002 FIFA World Cup qualification
18	24 June 2001	Stadium Australia, Sydney	New Zealand	4–1	4–1	2002 FIFA World Cup qualification
19	31 May 2004	Hindmarsh Stadium, Adelaide, Australia	Tahiti	8–0	9–0	2004 OFC Nations Cup
20	29 March 2005	Subiaco Oval, Perth, Australia	Indonesia	3–0	3–0	Friendly

== Managerial statistics ==
As of match played 3 January 2026

Managerial record by team and tenure
Team	Nat	From	To	Record							
Team	Nat	From	To	G	W	D	L	GF	GA	GD	Win %
Perth Glory	(Australia)	1 July 2024	28 October 2025	33	7	6	20	39	67	−28	21.21
Career Total				33	7	6	20	39	67	−28	21.21

== Honours ==
Sydney FC

- A-League Championship: 2005–06
- Oceania Club Championship: 2004–05

Australia

- FIFA Confederations Cup: 3rd place, 2001
- OFC Nations Cup: 2000, 2004
- AFC–OFC Challenge Cup: runner-up 2001

Individual

- NSL top scorer: 1996–97 with Sydney United with 21 goals
- Logie Award nomination for Outstanding Sports Commentator: 2009
