= Lokoua Taufahema =

Tongan footballer

Lokoua Taufahema (born 27 June 1973) is a former Tongan footballer. He played as a midfielder for Tonga Major League club Lotoha'apai United and the Tonga national team. He represented Tonga in the 2014 FIFA World Cup qualifiers. In 2001, he scored three goals in a 2002 FIFA World Cup qualification (OFC) match against American Samoa.

In 2013 he was appointed assistant coach of the Tonga U17 national team.

In December 2014 he killed his wife by pouring boiling oil on her face. In November 2015 he was acquitted of murder, but pleaded guilty to manslaughter. In January 2016 he was sentenced to 15 years imprisonment for the crime, with three years suspended.

== Career statistics ==
Scores and results list Tonga's goal tally first, score column indicates score after each Taufahema goal.

List of international goals scored by Lokoua Taufahema
No.	Date	Venue	Opponent	Score	Result	Competition
1	7 April 2001	International Sports Stadium, Coffs Harbour, Australia	Samoa	1–0	1–0	2002 FIFA World Cup qualification
2	14 April 2001	International Sports Stadium, Coffs Harbour, Australia	American Samoa	1–0	5–0	2002 FIFA World Cup qualification
3	14 April 2001	International Sports Stadium, Coffs Harbour, Australia	American Samoa	2–0	5–0	2002 FIFA World Cup qualification
4	14 April 2001	International Sports Stadium, Coffs Harbour, Australia	American Samoa	3–0	5–0	2002 FIFA World Cup qualification
5	24 November 2011	National Soccer Stadium, Apia, Samoa	Samoa	1–1	1–1	2014 FIFA World Cup qualification
