= Australia 31–0 American Samoa =

2001 association football match

Australia 31–0 American Samoaña
- Event: 2002 FIFA World Cup qualification
| Australia | American Samoa |
| (Australia) | (American Samoa) |
| 31 | 0 |
- Date: 11 April 2001
- Venue: International Sports Stadium, Coffs Harbour, Australia
- Man of the Match: Archie Thompson
- Referee: Ronan Leaustic (Tahiti)
- Attendance: 3,000 (estimated)

On 11 April 2001, the Australian and American Samoan national association football teams played each other in an Oceanian qualifying match for the 2002 FIFA World Cup. The match was played at the International Sports Stadium in Coffs Harbour, Australia. Australia set a world record for the largest victory in an international football match, winning the game 31–0. Australia's Archie Thompson also broke the record for most goals scored by a player in an international match by scoring 13 goals. David Zdrilic, the scorer of eight goals in the match, scored the second-highest number of goals in an international match since World War I.

The outcome of the match led to debates about the format of the qualification tournament, which had previously (in the 1998 qualification) contained a preliminary round to avoid such lopsided matches. Australian manager Frank Farina and Thompson criticised the new format, eventually leading FIFA to reintroduce a preliminary round in the Oceanian zone qualification for the 2006 FIFA World Cup. The unbalanced level of opponents was also addressed by Australia's return to the Asian Football Confederation (AFC) in 2006. (Note: Australia was previously part of the AFC from 1973 to 1978.)

== Background ==
The first attempt from Oceanian teams to qualify for the FIFA World Cup came at the 1966 FIFA World Cup. In subsequent tournaments, they entered joint qualification competitions with the Asian zone until a separate qualification round for the Oceania Football Confederation was introduced in 1986. By the 2002 FIFA World Cup qualification tournament, this had grown to a competition with ten teams entering. The ten teams were divided into two groups of five teams, where each team played against each other once. The two group winners would advance to the final round and play against each other in a home-and-away format. The winner of Oceania would advance to the intercontinental play-off round against the fifth best team in the South American zone for a place in the World Cup. Australia and American Samoa were placed in Group 1 along with Fiji, Samoa and Tonga with the matches to be played at Coffs Harbour, Australia in April 2001.

Australia and New Zealand were widely recognised as the strongest teams in the Oceanian zone. They were the only teams to have won the OFC Nations Cup, and the only ones to have qualified for the World Cup: Australia had qualified in 1974 and New Zealand in 1982. American Samoa was one of the weakest teams in the world, having lost all of their official international matches since they had joined FIFA in 1998. Before the match, Australia was ranked 75th in the FIFA World Rankings, while American Samoa was ranked 203rd, the lowest of all FIFA members.

Two days before the match, Australia recorded a 22–0 win over Tonga, breaking the previous record for the largest winning margin in an international match, held by Kuwait who won 20–0 against Bhutan in 2000.

American Samoa had only recently joined FIFA, and this was their first World Cup qualifying campaign ever. It had already suffered two defeats before the match, a 13–0 loss to Fiji and an 8–0 loss to Samoa. It was also American Samoa's first and, to date, only match against Australia.

== Match summary ==
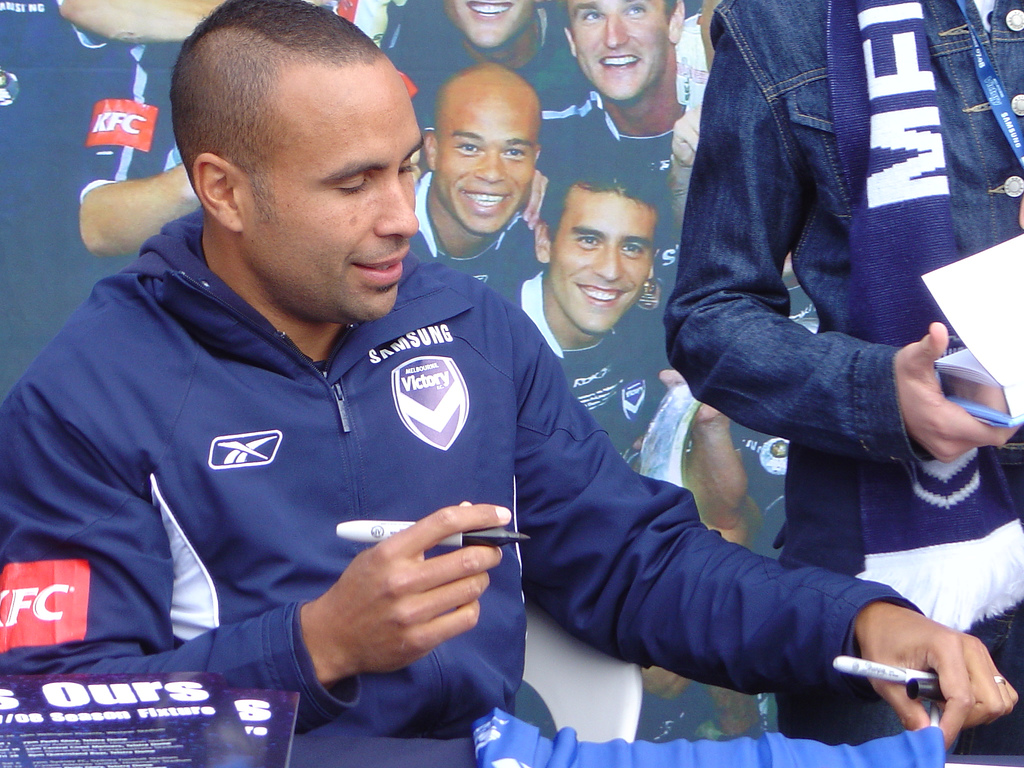
Australia's Archie Thompson scored 13 goals in the match.

Australia fielded a team with several rarely used players as many regulars were either rested or omitted from the team. Strikers John Aloisi and Damian Mori, who combined for 10 goals in the 22–0 win over Tonga, were also omitted for this match. The American Samoa team were troubled by passport issues, with only one member of their original 20-man senior team, 20-year-old goalkeeper Nicky Salapu, eligible to play. He was named captain for the match. American Samoa was also unable to call their under-20 players because most of them were involved in high school exams at the time. They were forced to draft in youth players, including three 15-year-old players, to put together a makeshift team with an average age of 18. According to team manager and Football Federation American Samoa vice-president Tony Langkilde, some of the team's players had never played a full 90-minute match before the match with Australia.

American Samoa held Australia scoreless for the first nine minutes of play until Con Boutsianis scored Australia's first goal from a corner kick. Archie Thompson scored his first goal in the 12th minute. His strike partner David Zdrilic added his first goal a minute later. Tony Popovic added two successive goals in the 17th and 19th minutes to extend Australia's lead to 6–0. In the 25th minute, Zdrilic achieved a hat-trick, making the score 9–0 for Australia. Thompson then scored 6 of the next 7 goals as Australia led 16–0 at half-time. Thompson led Australia in scoring with 8 goals at half-time and Zdrilic had 4 goals.

Boutsianis, who scored the first goal of the first half, scored the first goal of the second half in the 50th minute. Boutsianis later added another goal to complete his hat-trick. Thompson and Zdrilic added five and four goals to finish with thirteen and eight goals, respectively. Boutsianis finished with 3 goals, while Popovic, Aurelio Vidmar and Simon Colosimo scored two goals each and substitute Fausto De Amicis netting once. In the 86th minute, despite being down by 29 goals, American Samoa managed to launch an attack towards Australia's goal when Pati Feagiai had a shot, which was saved by Michael Petkovic. That was American Samoa's only shot on goal.

The large number of goals created confusion over the correct scoreline. At the end of the match, the scoreboard at the stadium showed 32–0 and Thompson was credited with 14 goals. After the statistician did a recount, the 31–0 scoreline was announced and Thompson's total goal count was reduced to 13. After the match, FIFA went on to release the official statistics after receiving the official report from the referee and match officials, which confirmed the 31–0 scoreline and Thompson's 13 goals.

=== Details ===
11 April 2001
19:00 AEST
First round – 6th fixture

| Australia | 31–0 | American Samoa |
|---|---|---|
| Boutsianis 10', 50', 84'; Thompson 12', 23', 27', 29', 32', 37', 42', 45', 56', 60', 65', 85', 88'; Zdrilic 13', 21', 25', 33', 58', 66', 78', 89'; A. Vidmar 14', 80'; Popovic 17', 19'; Colosimo 51', 81'; De Amicis 55' | Report |

International Sports Stadium, Coffs Harbour
Attendance: 3,000
Referee: Ronan Leaustic (Tahiti)

| Australia | American Samoa |

| GK | 1 | Michael Petkovic |
| CB | 2 | Kevin Muscat (c) |
| CB | 3 | Craig Moore |
| CB | 4 | Tony Popovic | (substituted off) 46' |
| RM | 7 | Aurelio Vidmar |
| CM | 12 | Steve Horvat |
| CM | 14 | Simon Colosimo |
| LM | 5 | Tony Vidmar | (substituted off) 46' |
| AM | 13 | Con Boutsianis |
| CF | 20 | Archie Thompson |
| CF | 11 | David Zdrilic |
Substitutes:
| DF | 6 | Hayden Foxe |
| MF | 8 | Scott Chipperfield |
| FW | 9 | John Aloisi |
| MF | 10 | Steve Corica |
| DF | 15 | Fausto De Amicis | (substituted on) 46' |
| DF | 16 | Lindsay Wilson |
| DF | 17 | Scott Miller | (substituted on) 46' |
| GK | 18 | Clint Bolton |
| FW | 19 | Damian Mori |
Manager:
Frank Farina

| GK | 1 | Nicky Salapu (c) |
| DF | 4 | Lisi Leututu | (substituted off) 50' |
| DF | 5 | Soe Falimaua |
| DF | 7 | Lavalu Fatu |
| DF | 9 | Travis Sinapati |
| DF | 18 | Tiaoali Savea |
| MF | 8 | Sulifou Faaloua |
| MF | 13 | Sam Mulipola |
| MF | 15 | Pati Feagiai |
| MF | 20 | Young Im Min |
| FW | 16 | Ben Falaniko | (substituted off) 84' |
Substitutes:
| MF | 11 | Marshall Silao |
| FW | 14 | Soga Maina |
| FW | 17 | Darrell Ioane | (substituted on) 84' |
| MF | 19 | Richard Mariko | (substituted on) 50' |
Manager:
Tunoa Lui

Man of the Match:
Archie Thompson (Australia)

Assistant referees:
David Sau (Solomon Islands)
Michel Angot (Tahiti)
Fourth official:
Derek Rugg (New Zealand)

== Records ==
Australia's 31–0 win broke their own record for the largest winning margin in an international match, a 22–0 win over Tonga recorded two days earlier in the same competition at the same stadium. Both wins surpassed the previous record held by Kuwait in a 20–0 win over Bhutan in the 2000 Asian Cup qualification. The match also broke the record for the largest margin in a World Cup qualification match. The previous record was held by Iran in a 19–0 win over Guam also in the 2002 World Cup qualification.

Apart from team records, individual records were also broken in the match. Australia's Thompson, who only had two international caps and one international goal before the match, scored 13 goals and broke the record for most goals scored in an international match. Zdrilic scored 8 goals and was widely reported as having recorded the second-most goals scored in an international match, after Thompson's 13 goals. His figure was less than the previous record of 10 goals, which was achieved by Denmark's Sophus Nielsen at the 1908 Olympics and Germany's Gottfried Fuchs at the 1912 Olympics. Nevertheless, this made Zdrilic's total the second highest in almost 90 years. Thompson also equalled the world record for most goals scored in a recognised senior match, set in 1885 when John Petrie scored 13 goals in Arbroath's 36–0 win over Bon Accord in a Scottish Cup match. The previous record in a World Cup qualifying match was seven goals and was jointly held by another Australian, Gary Cole, against Fiji in the 1982 World Cup qualifiers on 14 August 1981 and Iranian Karim Bagheri against the Maldives in the 1998 World Cup Asian qualifiers on 2 June 1997.

== Match reactions ==
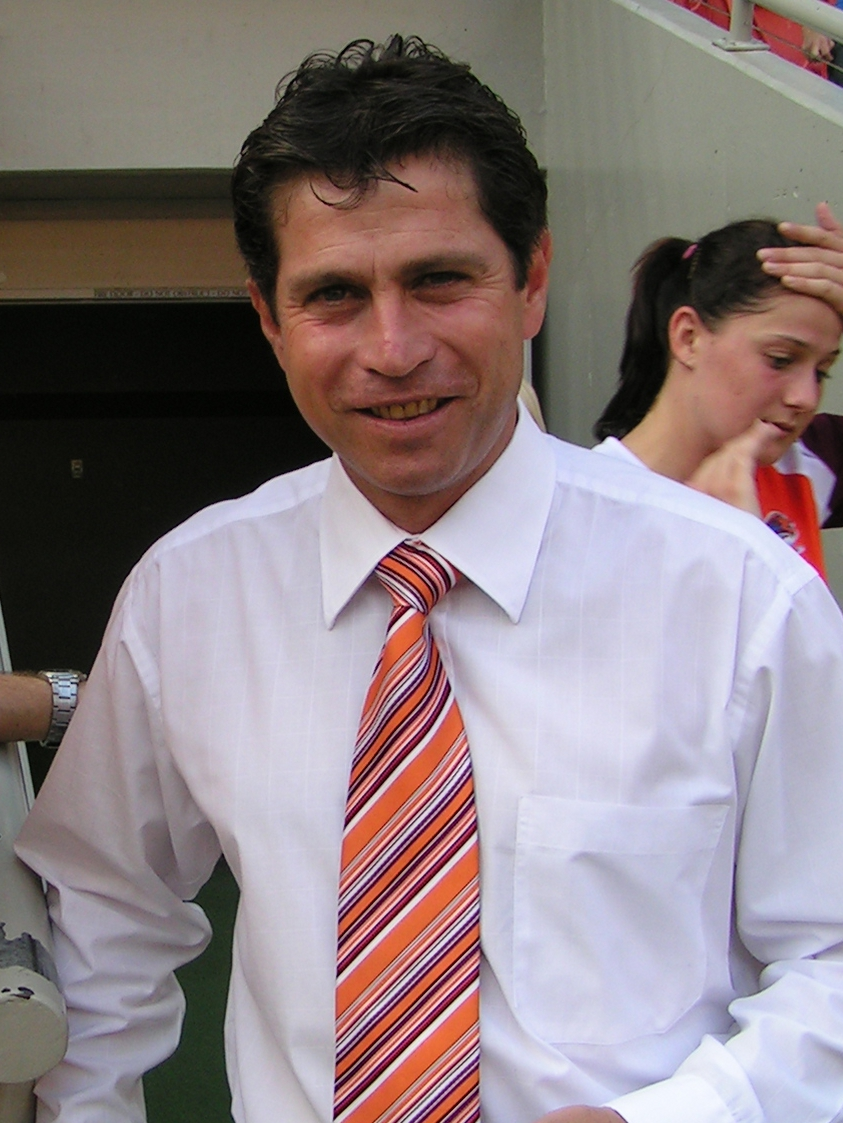
Australia's manager Frank Farina criticised the qualification format after the match.

Australia's manager Frank Farina criticised the qualification format and questioned the need for these kinds of matches. Thompson, who scored a record-setting 13 goals, was delighted with his record, but he also agreed with Farina's comments. FIFA spokesman Keith Cooper agreed with both comments and suggested a change in the qualification format, with the smaller teams entering a preliminary round. However, Oceania Football Confederation chairman Basil Scarsella opposed both comments and claimed that the smaller teams have the right to face Australia and New Zealand, similar to Australia having the right to face stronger opponents such as Brazil and France.

"Breaking the world record is a dream come true for me; that sort of thing doesn't come along every day. But you have to look at the teams we are playing and start asking questions. We don't need to play these games."

— Archie Thompson

This match and the other lopsided victories in the qualification partially contributed towards the reintroduction of a preliminary round for smaller teams in the 2006 FIFA World Cup qualifiers to avoid these one-sided matches. The significant gap between Australia, New Zealand and the rest of the teams in the Oceanian zone was one of the reasons behind Australia leaving the OFC at the end of 2005 to join the more competitive Asian Football Confederation (AFC). From the 2010 FIFA World Cup qualifiers onwards, Australia participated in the Asian zone qualification phase.

The American Samoan team did not feel down-hearted and even embraced and sang to the audience as the match finished. Salapu declared that he enjoyed the match and "wasn't embarrassed because we all learned something from it. If we had all our players, maybe it would have been only five or six goals, because I was without my best defenders and there was nothing I could do." Tony Langkilde also defended the goalkeeper, saying that he "kept the score down with a magnificent display". He also stated that "now we are recognised by FIFA, it has really helped spark an interest in football on the islands." Samoan manager Tunoa Lui commented that football was being played in the Samoan elementary and high schools and "in five years, we will be competitive."

== Post-match ==
American Samoa closed their qualification campaign with a 5–0 loss to Tonga, finishing bottom of the group with a −57 goal difference in four matches without scoring. Australia continued their qualification campaign with a 2–0 win over Fiji and an 11–0 win over Samoa, winning the group with a +66 goal difference in four matches without conceding a single goal.

FIFA World Cup Qualification – Oceanian zone – Group 1
| Team | Pld | W | D | L | GF | GA | GD | Pts |
|---|---|---|---|---|---|---|---|---|
| Australia | 4 | 4 | 0 | 0 | 66 | 0 | +66 | 12 |
| Fiji | 4 | 3 | 0 | 1 | 27 | 4 | +23 | 9 |
| Tonga | 4 | 2 | 0 | 2 | 7 | 30 | −23 | 6 |
| Samoa | 4 | 1 | 0 | 3 | 9 | 18 | −9 | 3 |
| American Samoa | 4 | 0 | 0 | 4 | 0 | 57 | −57 | 0 |

Australia then defeated New Zealand, the other group winners, with an aggregate score of 6–1. By winning the Oceanian zone, they advanced to the inter-continental play-off round against Uruguay, the fifth best team in the South American zone, where they were defeated with an aggregate score of 1–3, therefore failing to qualify for the 2002 World Cup.

== See also ==
- Next Goal Wins, a 2014 documentary film about the match and American Samoa's attempt to be better
- Next Goal Wins, a 2023 dramatisation directed by Taika Waititi based on the above documentary
- The Federated States of Micronesia national under-23 football team, who conceded an average of 38 goals a match without scoring themselves at the 2015 Pacific Games
- AS Adema 149–0 SO l'Emyrne
- Arbroath 36–0 Bon Accord
- Running up the score
