= 1998 FIFA World Cup qualification (OFC) =

Tournament details
- Dates: 16 September 1996 – 29 November 1997
- Teams: 10 (from 1 confederation)

Tournament statistics
- Matches played: 22
- Goals scored: 85 (3.86 per match)
- Attendance: 99,533 (4,524 per match)
- Top scorer(s): (Solomon Islands) Noel Berry (7 goals)

Listed below are the dates and results for the 1998 FIFA World Cup qualification rounds for the Oceanian zone (OFC). For an overview of the qualification rounds, see the article 1998 FIFA World Cup qualification.

A total of 10 teams entered the competition. The Oceanian zone was allocated 0.5 places (out of 32) in the final tournament.

== Format ==
There would be three rounds of play:

- First round: Australia, New Zealand, Fiji and Tahiti, the four best ranked teams according to FIFA, received byes and advanced to the second round directly. The remaining six teams were divided into two groups of three teams each, namely the Melanesian group and the Polynesian group, based on geographical considerations. The teams played against each other once. The winner of the Melanesian group advanced to the second round. The runner-up of the Melanesian group and the winner of the Polynesian group advanced to the first round play-off. In the play-off, they played against each other on a home-and-away basis. The winner advanced to the second round.
- Second round: The six teams were divided into two groups of three teams each. The teams played against each other twice. The group winners advanced to the final round.
- Final round: The two teams played against each other on a home-and-away basis. The winner advanced to the AFC–OFC inter-confederation play-off.

== First round ==
=== Melanesian group ===
Pos	Team	Pld	W	D	L	GF	GA	GD	Pts	Qualification	Papua New Guinea national soccer team	Solomon Islands national football team	Vanuatu national football team
1	Papua New Guinea	2	1	1	0	3	2	+1	4	Second round	—	1–1	2–1
2	Solomon Islands	2	0	2	0	2	2	0	2	Play-off	—	—	1–1
3	Vanuatu	2	0	1	1	2	3	−1	1		—	—	—

16 September 1996

Papua New Guinea	1–1	Solomon Islands
Daniel 15'	Report	Rukumana 71'

Lae, Papua New Guinea
Attendance: 4,500
Referee: Eugene Brazzale (Australia)

18 September 1996

Solomon Islands	1–1	Vanuatu
Berry 16'	Report	Naukoot 37'

Lae, Papua New Guinea
Attendance: 2,500
Referee: Massimo Raveino (Tahiti)

20 September 1996

Papua New Guinea	2–1	Vanuatu
Furigi 88'; Karang 89'	Report	Garo 27'

Lae, Papua New Guinea
Attendance: 7,500
Referee: Eugene Brazzale (Australia)

=== Polynesian group ===
Pos	Team	Pld	W	D	L	GF	GA	GD	Pts	Qualification	Tonga national football team	Samoa national football team	Cook Islands national football team
1	Tonga	2	2	0	0	3	0	+3	6	Play-off	—	1–0	2–0
2	Western Samoa	2	1	0	1	2	2	0	3		—	—	2–1
3	Cook Islands	2	0	0	2	1	4	−3	0		—	—	—

11 November 1996

Tonga	2–0	Cook Islands
Moleni 20', 67'	Report

Nukuʻalofa, Tonga
Attendance: 500
Referee: Shameem Khan (Fiji)

13 November 1996

Western Samoa	2–1	Cook Islands
Tapunuu 10'; Palusami 20'	Report	Stenter 68'

Nukuʻalofa, Tonga
Attendance: 400
Referee: Neil Fox (New Zealand)

15 November 1996

Tonga	1–0	Western Samoa
Vane 29'	Report

Nukuʻalofa, Tonga
Attendance: 1,500
Referee: Derek Rugg (New Zealand)

=== Play-off ===
Team 1	Agg.	Team 2	1st leg	2nd leg
Tonga	0–13	Solomon Islands	0–4	0–9

15 February 1997

Tonga	0–4	Solomon Islands
	Report	Kiriau 34'; Seni 73'; Berry 85'; Peli 87'

Nukuʻalofa, Tonga
Attendance: 3,000
Referee: Derek Rugg (New Zealand)

1 March 1997

Solomon Islands	9–0	Tonga
Berry 3', 41', 57'; Rukumana 12'; Wabo 37'; Seni 61', 63', 74'; Kiriau 66'	Report

Honiara, Solomon Islands
Attendance: 4,000
Referee: Massimo Raveino (Tahiti)

Solomon Islands won 13–0 on aggregate and advanced to the second round.

== Second round ==
=== Group 1 ===
Pos	Team	Pld	W	D	L	GF	GA	GD	Pts	Qualification	Australia men's national soccer team	Solomon Islands national football team	Tahiti national football team
1	Australia	4	4	0	0	26	2	+24	12	Final round	—	13–0	5–0
2	Solomon Islands	4	1	1	2	7	21	−14	4		2–6	—	4–1
3	Tahiti	4	0	1	3	2	12	−10	1		0–2	1–1	—

11 June 1997

Australia	13–0	Solomon Islands
Mori 2', 15', 36', 65', 80'; Aloisi 33', 53', 81', 86', 87'; Foster 68'; Tapai 78'; Bosnich 88' (pen.)	Report

Sydney, Australia
Attendance: 3,127
Referee: Bruce Edward Grimshaw (New Zealand)

13 June 1997

Australia	5–0	Tahiti
Vidmar 14'; Trimboli 37', 42'; Arnold 47'; Bingley 66'	Report

Sydney, Australia
Attendance: 2,869
Referee: Brian Geoffery Precious (New Zealand)

15 June 1997

Solomon Islands	4–1	Tahiti
Seni 37'; Berry 39', 80'; Toata 89'	Report	Ludivion 82'

Sydney, Australia
Attendance: 253
Referee: Neil Fox (New Zealand)

17 June 1997

Solomon Islands	2–6	Australia
Peli 59'; Suri 65'	Report	Slater 15'; Arnold 17'; Kaierea 38' (o.g.); Tapai 47', 51'; Vidmar 75' (pen.)

Sydney, Australia
Attendance: 2,122
Referee: Brian Geoffery Precious (New Zealand)

19 June 1997

Tahiti	0–2	Australia
	Report	Zelic 8'; Trimboli 86'

Sydney, Australia
Attendance: 2,918
Referee: Bruce Edward Grimshaw (New Zealand)

21 June 1997

Tahiti	1–1	Solomon Islands
Rousseau 38'	Report	Kwaomae 43'

Sydney, Australia
Attendance: 266
Referee: Bruce Edward Grimshaw (New Zealand)

=== Group 2 ===
Pos	Team	Pld	W	D	L	GF	GA	GD	Pts	Qualification	New Zealand men's national football team	Fiji national football team	Papua New Guinea national soccer team
1	New Zealand	4	3	0	1	13	1	+12	9	Final round	—	5–0	7–0
2	Fiji	4	2	0	2	4	7	−3	6		0–1	—	3–1
3	Papua New Guinea	4	1	0	3	2	11	−9	3		1–0	0–1	—

31 May 1997

Papua New Guinea	1–0	New Zealand
Niakuam 80'	Report

Port Moresby, Papua New Guinea
Attendance: 3,000
Referee: Nik Ahmad Haji Yaakub (Malaysia)

7 June 1997

Fiji	0–1	New Zealand
	Report	Jackson 80' (pen.)

Ba, Fiji
Attendance: 5,500
Referee: Eugene Brazzale (Australia)

11 June 1997

New Zealand	7–0	Papua New Guinea
Coveny 10', 13', 67'; Rufer 22', 31'; Elliott 40'; Stevens 80'	Report

Auckland, New Zealand
Attendance: 2,000
Referee: Eddie Lennie (Australia)

15 June 1997

Fiji	3–1	Papua New Guinea
Pita 22'; Masinisau 26'; Duguga 89'	(report)	Waiwai 68'

Suva, Fiji
Attendance: 1,500
Referee: Eddie Lennie (Australia)

18 June 1997

New Zealand	5–0	Fiji
Rufer 17', 77'; Coveny 63'; Viljoen 80' van Steeden 85'	Report

Auckland, New Zealand
Attendance: 12,033
Referee: Massimo Raveino (Tahiti)

21 June 1997

Papua New Guinea	0–1	Fiji
	(report)	Driu 1'

Port Moresby, Papua New Guinea
Attendance: 3,000
Referee: Pirom Anprasert (Thailand)

== Final round ==
Team 1	Agg.	Team 2	1st leg	2nd leg
New Zealand	0–5	Australia	0–3	0–2

28 June 1997
19:30

New Zealand	0–3	Australia
	Report	Aloisi 18'; Vidmar 42'; Foster 67'

Mount Smart Stadium, Auckland, New Zealand
Attendance: 23,000
Referee: Masayoshi Okada (Japan)

New Zealand	Australia

6 July 1997
20:15

Australia	2–0	New Zealand
Zelić 6'; Arnold 54'	Report

Sydney Football Stadium, Sydney, Australia
Attendance: 14,045
Referee: Jamal Al Sharif (Syria)

Australia	New Zealand

Australia won 5–0 on aggregate and advanced to the AFC–OFC inter-confederation play-off.

== Inter-confederation play-off ==
Team 1	Agg.	Team 2	1st leg	2nd leg
Iran	3–3 (a)	Australia	1–1	2–2

== Goalscorers ==
There were 85 goals scored in 22 matches, for an average of 3.86 goals per match.

7 goals

- (Solomon Islands) Noel Berry

6 goals

- (Australia) John Aloisi

5 goals

- (Australia) Damian Mori
- (Solomon Islands) Robert Seni

4 goals

- (New Zealand) Vaughan Coveny
- (New Zealand) Wynton Rufer

3 goals

- (Australia) Graham Arnold
- (Australia) Ernie Tapai
- (Australia) Paul Trimboli
- (Australia) Aurelio Vidmar

2 goals

- (Australia) Craig Foster
- (Australia) Ned Zelic
- (Solomon Islands) George Kiriau
- (Solomon Islands) Augustine Peli
- (Solomon Islands) Eddie Rukumana
- (Tonga) Timote Moleni

1 goal

- (Australia) Mark Bosnich
- (Australia) Matthew Bingley
- (Australia) Robbie Slater
- (Cook Islands) Mani Stenter
- (Fiji) Solome Pita
- (Fiji) Esala Masinisau
- (Fiji) Liuai Duguga
- (Fiji) Alivate Driu
- (New Zealand) Chris Jackson
- (New Zealand) Simon Elliott
- (New Zealand) Tim Stevens
- (New Zealand) Riki van Steeden
- (New Zealand) Nik Viljoen
- (Papua New Guinea) Richard Daniel
- (Papua New Guinea) Batman Furigi
- (Papua New Guinea) Roy Karang
- (Papua New Guinea) Francis Niakuam
- (Papua New Guinea) Wesley Waiwai
- (Samoa) Michael Junior Palusami
- (Samoa) T. Tapunuu
- (Solomon Islands) Jeffrey Kwaomae
- (Solomon Islands) Batram Suri
- (Solomon Islands) Moses Toata
- (Solomon Islands) Danny Wabo
- (French Polynesia) Jean Ludivion
- (French Polynesia) Jean-Loup Rousseau
- (Tonga) Tolutau Vane
- (Vanuatu) Reginal Garo
- (Vanuatu) Iau Tuan Naukoot

1 own goal

- (Solomon Islands) Jimmy Kaierea (against Australia)
