= Coffs Harbour International Stadium =

Sports venue in Australia

- Interactive map of Coffs Harbour International Stadium
- Former names: BCU International Stadium (2007–10)
- Location: Coffs Harbour, New South Wales
- Coordinates: 30°19′22″S 153°05′43″E
- Owner: Coffs Harbour City Council
- Operator: Coffs Harbour Sports Unit
- Capacity: 10,000 – seating 3,000
- Surface: Grass

Construction
- Groundbreaking: 1992
- Opened: June 1994
- Architect: Various

Tenants
- Sydney Sixers (BBL) (2019–present); Cronulla-Sutherland Sharks (NRL) (2021–2024); Sydney Swans (AFLW) (2024–present); New South Wales cricket team (One-Day Cup) (2006); Newcastle Jets FC (A-League Men) (2017)

Website
- https://www.coffscoastevents.com.au/c-ex-coffs-international-stadium/

Ground information

International information
- First women's ODI: 27 November 2016: Australia v South Africa
- Last women's ODI: 29 October 2017: Australia v England
- As of 8 September 2020; Source: CricketArchive

The Coffs Harbour International Stadium, currently known as the C.ex Coffs International Stadium for sponsorship reasons, is a multi-purpose stadium located in the coastal city of Coffs Harbour, New South Wales.

The stadium was opened in June 1994, and has a capacity of 20,000 people, although the seating capacity in the stand is only 1,000. The record attendance for a sporting event is 12,000.

The stadium claims a place in the FIFA World Cup records as the venue for the highest scoring match in World Cup qualification history. It hosted the match in which Australia beat American Samoa 31–0 on 11 April 2001.

North Coast Football play their Over 35s matches and finals matches at Coffs Harbour International Stadium.

The stadium regularly hosts NRL trial matches, and since 2021, hosts an annual Cronulla-Sutherland Sharks home game. The stadium also hosts at least one Sydney Sixers game every BBL season and formerly hosted ING Cup cricket matches involving the New South Wales Blues. For the past two years it has hosted the FFA National Youth Championships.

The stadium hosted 2007 and 2013's City vs Country Origin rugby league match.

The AFL North Coast has played its finals and Grand Finals at the Stadium every year since 1994. The League also hosts a junior representative carnival, the Northern NSW Championship, at the venue each year. The Championship involves under age representative teams from the AFL North Coast, AFL Illawarra and AFL Hunter/Central Coast. The Sydney Swans played a AFL Women's league game at the stadium in 2024, and will return in 2025.

== Touch Football ==
The stadium annually plays host to major events on the Touch Football calendar in Australia. The National Touch League is contested each year during March by the 13 permits from around Australia. The event features some of the best players from around Australia and the world.

== Attendance records ==
Top 10 Sports Attendance Records

| No. | Date | Teams | Sport | Competition | Crowd |
|---|---|---|---|---|---|
| 1 | 16 February 2013 | South Sydney Rabbitohs vs. Newcastle Knights | Rugby league | NRL (preseason) | 10,838 |
| 2 | 3 January 2024 | Sydney Sixers vs. Brisbane Heat | Cricket | BBL | 10,372 |
| 3 | 20 May 2023 | Cronulla-Sutherland Sharks vs. Newcastle Knights | Rugby league | NRL | 10,156 |
| 4 | 5 January 2020 | Sydney Sixers vs. Adelaide Strikers | Cricket | BBL | 9,834 |
| 5 | 17 January 2023 | Sydney Sixers vs. Adelaide Strikers | Cricket | BBL | 9,576 |
| 6 | 17 February 2007 | Gold Coast Titans vs. Melbourne Storm | Rugby league | NRL (preseason) | 9,500 |
| 7 | 18 June 2022 | Cronulla-Sutherland Sharks vs. Gold Coast Titans | Rugby league | NRL | 9,058 |
| 8 | 5 July 2024 | Cronulla-Sutherland Sharks vs. Gold Coast Titans | Rugby league | NRL | 8,673 |
| 9 | 3 May 2007 | City vs. Country | Rugby league | City vs Country Origin | 8,149 |
| 10 | 19 January 2003 | New South Wales Blues vs. Western Warriors | Cricket | ING Cup | 8,000 |

As of 12 July 2024
