= 2026 Tupapa Maraerenga F.C. season =

English football club season

Tupapa Maraerenga
2026 season
- President: Grover Harmon
- Head coach(es): Jarves Aperau, David Milanovic
- Stadium: Victoria Park, Avarua
- Round Cup: 4th
- O-League qualifying: 1st
- O-League: Group stage
Home colours	Away colours

The 2026 season is the 58th season in the history of Tupapa Maraerenga. The club competed in OFC Men's Champions League qualifying stage and will compete in the OFC Men's Champions League, Cook Islands Round Cup and Cook Islands Cup.

The Black and Whites won the 2026 OFC Men's Champions League qualifying stage.

== Round Cup ==
=== Matches ===
Win Draw Loss Fixtures

17 July 2026 1	Tupapa	3–2	Avatiu	Matavera
17:10 (UTC-10:00)	Reupena , 43' (o.g.); Mustonen 83'; Denny 90+3'		Teena 20'; Reddy 90+8'	Stadium: CIFA Field

24 July 2026 2	Tupapa	0–2	Nikao	Matavera
17:10 (UTC-10:00)	Mustonen (penalty missed)		David; Ngire	Stadium: CIFA Field; Attendance: 150

3 August 2026 3	Matavera-Ngatangiia	0–2	Tupapa	Matavera
16:20 (UTC-10:00)			Harmon 30'; Enoka	Stadium: Takitumu School

19 August 2026 4	Tupapa	13–0	Puaikura	Matavera
16:00 (UTC-10:00)				Stadium: CIFA Field

23 August 2026 6	Tupapa	9–2	Avatiu	Avarua
16:20 (UTC-10:00)	Mustonen 11'; Maraetefau 18', 19', 22'; Gibbens 25', 41', 73'; Tuteru 37'; Elikana (pen.), 68'		L. Nand 28'; T. Nand (pen.), 54'	Stadium: Victoria Park

23 August 2026 7	Nikao	0–0	Tupapa	Nikao
16:20 (UTC-10:00)			Maraetefau (penalty missed); Tuteru (red card) 70'	Stadium: Nikao Field

4 August 2026 8	Matavera	2–5	Tupapa
16:20 (UTC-10:00)

== O-League ==
Tupapa entered the 2026 OFC Men's Champions League qualifying stage as 2025 Cook Islands Round Cup champions.

=== Matches ===
31 January 2026
16:00

Tupapa Maraerenga (Cook Islands)	3–0	(Tonga) Nukuhetulu
Bunch 10', 24'; Tuakana 29'	(Report) (OFC)

FFS Football Stadium (Field 1), Apia
Attendance: 75
Referee: Jarethy George (Vanuatu)
3 February 2026
16:00

Tupapa Maraerenga (Cook Islands)	1–1	(Samoa) Vaivase-Tai
Webb 25'	(Report) (OFC)	Fa'amatau 58'

FFS Football Stadium (Field 1), Apia
Attendance: 200
Referee: Gideon Mamuala (Solomon Islands)
6 February 2026
16:00

Pago Youth (American Samoa)	0–3	(Cook Islands) Tupapa Maraerenga
	(Report) (OFC)	Bunch 25', 45' (pen.); Harmon 90+1'

FFS Football Stadium (Field 1), Apia
Attendance: 100
Referee: Kyllian Lelarge (New Caledonia)
9 August 2026
12:00

Lae City (Papua New Guinea)	4–1	(Cook Islands) Tupapa Maraerenga
Kamake 17'; Tuteru 43' (o.g.); Moses 52'; Api 90+2'	Report	Rimene-Albrett 72'

Churchill Park, Lautoka
Attendance: 100
Referee: Ben Aukwai (Solomon Islands)
12 August 2026
16:00

Rewa (Fiji)	4–2	(Cook Islands) Tupapa Maraerenga
Khan 40'; Athale 48'; Hughes 67'; Sela 85'	Report	Rimene-Albrett 47'; Maraetefau 90+4'

Govind Park, Ba
Attendance: 752
Referee: Timothy Niu (Solomon Islands)
15 August 2026
12:00

Tupapa Maraerenga (Cook Islands)	1–7	(Vanuatu) Galaxy
Rimene-Albrett 88'	Report	Viliamu 25' (o.g.); Moses 41'; Medina 47', 55', 70'; Roberson 49'; Soksok 90+1'

Govind Park, Ba
Attendance: 100
Referee: Neeshil Varman (Fiji)

== Squad statistics ==
No.	Pos.	Name	League		Cup		O-League		Total		Discipline	
No.	Pos.	Name	Apps	Goals	Apps	Goals	Apps	Goals	Apps	Goals	Yellow card	Red card
1	GK	(Cook Islands) Moana Rakei	3+	0+	0	0	0(2)	0	3(2)	0	0	0
2	FW	(Cook Islands) Marcus Gibbens	5+	3+	0	0	0(2)	0	5(2)	3	0	0
3	DF	(French Polynesia) Tauhiki Bohl	—		—		3	0	3	0	0	0
4	MF	(French Polynesia) Honoura Maraetefau	2+	3+	—		3	1	5	4	0	0
5	MF	(Cook Islands) Maui Denny	1	1	—		0(2)	0	1(2)	1	0	0
6	MF	(Cook Islands) Ngametua Tuakana	4(1)+	0+	0	0	4(2)	1	8(3)	1	1	0
7	MF	(Sri Lanka) Aadil Kameldeen	—		—		6	0	6	0	0	0
8	DF	(Cook Islands) Jarves Aperau	5+	0+	0	0	3	0	3	0	0	0
9	DF	(Cook Islands) Moses Taokia	2(2)+	0	0	0	—		2(1)	0	0	0
10	FW	(Cook Islands) Kima Webb	1	0	0	0	5	1	6	1	0	0
11	FW	(Cook Islands) Temaruata Tearaitoa	5+	0+	0	0	0(2)	0	3	0	2	0
12	MF	(Cook Islands) Shane Tuteru	5+	1+	0	0	3	0	8	1	4	1
13	MF	(Cook Islands) Grover Harmon	4+	1+	0	0	6	1	10	2	0	0
14	FW	(Cook Islands) Tremaine Rimene-Albrett	—		—		3	3	3	3	0	0
15	FW	(Cook Islands) Dwayne Tiputoa	—		—		3	0	3	0	0	0
16	DF	(Cook Islands) Sean Angene	4+	0+	0	0	0(1)	0	4(1)	0	0	0
18	DF	(Samoa) Key Villiamu	—		—		3	0	3	0	0	0
19	MF	(Cook Islands) Owenne Matapo	2(2)+	0	0	0	0(1)	0	1(2)	0	0	0
20	GK	(Cook Islands) Tahiri Elikana	1+	1+	—		3	0	4	1	0	0
—	DF	(England) Jordan Boon	—		—		3	0	3	0	0	0
—	DF	(Cook Islands) John Noovao	3(1)+	0+	0	0	1(2)	0	4(3)	0	1	0
—	MF	(New Zealand) Joshua Galletly	—		—		3	0	3	0	0	0
—	FW	(Cook Islands) Geoffrey Strickland	1(2)+	0+	0	0	0(2)	0	0(3)	0	0	0
—	FW	(Cook Islands) Campbell Best	0(1)+	0+	0	0	0(2)	0	0(3)	0	0	0
—	DF	(Cook Islands) Oscar Wichman	1+	0+	—		3	0	4	0	1	0
—	FW	(England) Daniel Bunch	—		—		3	4	3	4	0	0
—	DF	(Cook Islands) Joshua Karika	—		—		3	0	3	0	0	1
—	DF	(Cook Islands) Dallas Rongokea	—		—		2	0	2	0	1	1
—	GK	(Cook Islands) Emmett Connolly	—		—		3	0	3	0	0	0
—	DF	(Canada) David Milanovic	0+	0+	0	0	—		0	0	0	0
—	FW	(Cook Islands) Paavo Mustonen (c)	5+	2+	0	0	—		5	2	0	0
—	DF	(Cook Islands) Avi Enoka	4+	1	0	0	—		4	1	0	0
—	FW	(Cook Islands) Ta'i	1+	0+	0	0	—		1	0	0	0
Own goals			—	1	—	0	—	0	—	1	—	
