= 2012 Cook Islands Round Cup =

Cook Islands Football League season

Cook Islands Round Cup
- Season: 2012
- Champions: Tupapa Maraerenga
- 2013–14 OFC Champions League: Tupapa Maraerenga
- Matches: 42
- Goals: 193 (4.6 per match)
- Biggest home win: Nikao Sokattack 15–0 Titikaveka
- Biggest away win: Matavera 0–9 Tupapa Maraerenga
- Highest scoring: Nikao Sokattack 15–0 Titikaveka

The 2012 season of the Cook Islands Round Cup was the thirty ninth recorded season of top flight association football competition in the Cook Islands, with any results between 1951 and 1969 and also in 1986 and 1988–1990 currently unknown. Tupapa Maraerenga won the championship, and qualified for the 2013–14 OFC Champions League. This was their tenth recorded championship, although other sources suggest that their victories in 1992 and 1993 were won by Takuvaine and Avatiu respectively. It was also their second hat trick of titles following their successes in the 2001, 2002 and 2003 seasons. Nikao Sokattack were runners-up, with Arorangi finishing in third place.

== League table ==
Tupapa Maraerenga won the league, which was played on a round robin home and away basis.

Pos	Team	Pld	W	D	L	GF	GA	GD	Pts	Qualification
1	Tupapa Maraerenga (C)	12	10	1	1	54	7	+47	31	Qualified for 2013–14 OFC Champions League
2	Nikao Sokattack	12	8	0	4	55	12	+43	24	
3	Arorangi	12	6	1	5	23	31	−8	19	
4	Matavera	12	6	1	5	14	26	−12	19	
5	Takuvaine	12	3	3	6	14	37	−23	12	
6	Avatiu	12	2	3	7	16	29	−13	9	
7	Titikaveka	12	1	3	8	17	48	−31	6	

Rules for classification: 1) points; 2) goal difference; 3) number of goals scored.
(C) Champions

== Results ==
Home \ Away	ARO	AVA	MAT	NIK	TAK	TIT	TUP
Arorangi		2–1	5–0	0–3 (Note: The Arorangi 1–5 Nikao Sokattack match was awarded to Arorangi)	1–3	5–1	1–1
Avatiu	2–1		1–2	0–3	2–2	0–0	1–6
Matavera	3–1	1–0		2–0	0–1	2–2	0–9
Nikao Sokattack	6–1	3–2	4–0		2–3	15–0	1–2
Takuvaine	0–4	1–1	1–3	0–2		2–9	0–3
Titikaveka	0–1	2–5	0–1	1–9	1–1		0–4
Tupapa Maraerenga	9–0	6–1	2–0	0–2	9–0	3–1	

Updated to match(es) played on 24 November 2012. Source:
Legend: Blue = home team win; Yellow = draw; Red = away team win.
