= 2010 Cook Islands Round Cup =

Cook Islands Round Cup
- Season: 2010
- Champions: Tupapa Maraerenga
- Matches: 42
- Goals: 232 (5.52 per match)
- Biggest home win: Nikao Sokattack 12–0 Arorangi
- Biggest away win: Arorangi 0–12 Nikao Sokattack
- Highest scoring: Titikaveka 9–4 Takuvaine

The 2010 season of the Cook Islands Round Cup, named the "Lotto Premier Men's Competition" for sponsorship reasons, was the thirty seventh recorded season of top flight association football competition in the Cook Islands, with any results between 1951 and 1969 and also in 1986 and 1988–1990 currently unknown. Tupapa Maraerenga won the championship, their eighth recorded championship, although other sources suggest that their victories in 1992 and 1993 were won by Takuvaine and Avatiu respectively. Nikao Sokattack were runners-up, with Takuvaine finishing in third place.

== League table ==
Tupapa Maraerenga won the league, which was played on a round robin home and away basis.

Pos	Team	Pld	W	D	L	GF	GA	GD	Pts
1	Tupapa Maraerenga (C)	12	10	1	1	64	8	+56	31
2	Nikao Sokattack	12	10	1	1	56	12	+44	31
3	Takuvaine	12	5	2	5	27	44	−17	17
4	Avatiu	12	4	3	5	31	31	0	15
5	Titikaveka	12	2	3	7	21	44	−23	9
6	Matavera	12	1	5	6	17	32	−15	8
7	Arorangi	12	2	1	9	16	61	−45	7

Rules for classification: 1) points; 2) goal difference; 3) number of goals scored.
(C) Champions

== Results ==
Home \ Away	ARO	AVA	MAT	NIK	TAK	TIT	TUP
Arorangi		1–8	2–1	0–12	1–3	1–2	1–8
Avatiu	1–7		2–2	2–4	1–4	4–0	1–5
Matavera	3–0 (Note: The Matavera-Arorangi match was awarded 3–0 to Matavera due to a fuel shortage.)	2–2		1–3	2–2	1–1	0–5
Nikao Sokattack	12–0	4–1	4–1		2–1	7–0	1–3
Takuvaine	3–1	1–1	3–2	2–3		3–2	1–11
Titikaveka	1–1	1–7	2–2	1–4	9–4		1–6
Tupapa Maraerenga	7–1	0–1	6–0	0–0	9–0	4–1	

Updated to match(es) played on 27 November 2010. Source:
Legend: Blue = home team win; Yellow = draw; Red = away team win.
