= Ano Tisam =

Personal information
- Full name: Anonga Nardu Tisam
- Date of birth: 25 April 1982 (age 44)
- Place of birth: Port Moresby, Papua New Guinea
- Positions: Midfielder; forward

Senior career*
Years	Team	Apps	(Gls)
2007–2012	Nikao Rarotonga		
2012–2014	Puaikura FC	10	(3)
2026–	Puaikura FC		

International career
2001	Cook Islands U20		
2004	Cook Islands U23	2	(0)
2007–2009	Cook Islands	4	(0)
2006	Cook Islands (beach)	4	(0)

Managerial career
- 2012: Arorangi FC (coach)
- * Club domestic league appearances and goals

Anoanga Nardu Tisam (born 25 April 1982) is a retired Cook Islands international footballer, of Cook Islands and Papua New Guinea decent. He was born in Papua New Guinea and brought up there before relocating to the Cook Islands with his parents in the early 90s. He is the brother of fellow international footballers Nathan Tisam and Tuka Tisam.

== International career ==
Tisam played two games in qualification for the 2004 Olympics, playing 90 minutes in a 9–0 loss to New Zealand and a 3–2 victory over American Samoa. He made his full international debut in 2007 in a 4–0 loss to Fiji.

He has also represented the Cook Islands in beach soccer, playing four games at the 2006 OFC Beach Soccer Championship.

== Career statistics ==
=== Club ===
As of 2015.

Club	Season	League			Cup		Continental		Other		Total	
Club	Season	Division	Apps	Goals	Apps	Goals	Apps	Goals	Apps	Goals	Apps	Goals
Nikao Rarotonga	2012	Cook Islands Round Cup	4	0	0	0	–		0	0	4	0
Puaikura FC	2012	Cook Islands Round Cup	8	3	0	0	–		0	0	8	3
Puaikura FC	2013	Cook Islands Round Cup	0	0	0	0	–		0	0	0	0
Puaikura FC	2014	Cook Islands Round Cup	2	0	0	0	–		0	0	2	0
Puaikura FC	2026	Cook Islands Round Cup	–		–		–		–		–	
Puaikura FC	Total		10	3	0	0	–		0	0	10	3
Career total			14	3	0	0	–		0	0	14	3

=== International ===
As of matches played 2009.

National team	Year	Apps	Goals
Tonga	2007	3	0
Tonga	2008	0	0
Tonga	2009	1	0
Total		4	0
