= 2011 Cook Islands Round Cup =

Cook Islands Round Cup
- Season: 2011
- Champions: Tupapa Maraerenga
- 2012–13 OFC Champions League: Tupapa Maraerenga
- Matches: 42
- Goals: 162 (3.86 per match)
- Biggest home win: Nikao Sokattack 9–0 Titikaveka
- Biggest away win: Matavera 1–11 Tupapa Maraerenga
- Highest scoring: Matavera 1–11 Tupapa Maraerenga

The 2011 season of the Cook Islands Round Cup was the thirty eighth recorded season of top flight association football competition in the Cook Islands, with any results between 1951 and 1969 and also in 1986 and 1988–1990 currently unknown. Tupapa Maraerenga won the championship, and qualified for the 2012–13 OFC Champions League. This was their ninth recorded championship, although other sources suggest that their victories in 1992 and 1993 were won by Takuvaine and Avatiu respectively. Nikao Sokattack were runners-up, with Takuvaine finishing in third place, the same positions as they finished the previous season.

== League table ==
Tupapa Maraerenga won the league, which was played on a round robin home and away basis.

| Pos | Team | Pld | W | D | L | GF | GA | GD | Pts | Qualification |
|---|---|---|---|---|---|---|---|---|---|---|
| 1 | Tupapa Maraerenga (C) | 12 | 10 | 2 | 0 | 55 | 6 | +49 | 32 | Qualified for 2012–13 OFC Champions League |
| 2 | Nikao Sokattack | 12 | 10 | 1 | 1 | 40 | 8 | +32 | 31 | |
| 3 | Takuvaine | 12 | 5 | 1 | 6 | 20 | 26 | −6 | 16 | |
| 4 | Titikaveka | 12 | 4 | 2 | 6 | 15 | 39 | −24 | 14 | |
| 5 | Arorangi | 12 | 4 | 2 | 6 | 13 | 26 | −13 | 14 | |
| 6 | Avatiu | 12 | 2 | 3 | 7 | 12 | 29 | −17 | 9 | |
| 7 | Matavera | 12 | 1 | 1 | 10 | 7 | 28 | −21 | 4 | |

Rules for classification: 1) points; 2) goal difference; 3) number of goals scored.
(C) Champions

== Results ==
| Home \ Away | ARO | AVA | MAT | NIK | TAK | TIT | TUP |
|---|---|---|---|---|---|---|---|
| Arorangi | | 1–3 | 2–1 | 0–2 | 3–1 | 3–2 | 0–3 |
| Avatiu | 0–0 | | 2–1 | 1–2 | 1–1 | 1–2 | 1–5 |
| Matavera | 0–1 | 3–0 | | 1–2 | 0–1 | 0–1 | 1–11 |
| Nikao Sokattack | 5–2 | 5–0 | 2–0 | | 2–1 | 9–0 | 2–2 |
| Takuvaine | 6–0 | 2–0 | 1–0 | 0–4 | | 2–3 | |
| Titikaveka | 2–0 | 2–2 | 1–1 | 0–5 | 2–4 | | 0–9 |
| Tupapa Maraerenga | 1–1 | 5–1 | 4–0 | 1–0 | 7–0 | 3–0 | |

Updated to match(es) played on 29 November 2011. Source:
Legend: Blue = home team win; Yellow = draw; Red = away team win.
