= 2021 Cook Islands Round Cup =

Cook Islands Round Cup
- Season: 2021
- Dates: 21 August 2021 – 4 December 2021
- Champions: Nikao
- Matches played: 30
- Goals scored: 155 (5.17 per match)

The 2021 Cook Islands Round Cup (also known as Vans Premiership due to sponsorship reasons) is the 48th recorded edition of the Cook Islands Round Cup, the top association football league of the Cook Islands organised by the Cook Islands Football Association. The season began on 21 August 2021 with six teams from the island of Rarotonga competing in triple round-robin format. Tupapa Maraerenga added to their championships as they had won the cup since the 2017 Cook Islands Round Cup. The champions of the league qualified for the 2021 OFC Champions League.

== Teams ==
- Avatiu
- Matavera
- Nikao Sokattak
- Puaikura
- Titikaveka
- Tupapa Maraerenga

== League table ==
Pos	Team	Pld	W	D	L	GF	GA	GD	Pts	Qualification or relegation
1	Nikao Sokattak	15	12	1	2	38	6	+32	37	Qualification to OFC Champions League qualifying stage
2	Tupapa Maraerenga	15	11	1	3	43	15	+28	34	
3	Titikaveka	15	6	4	5	27	27	0	22	
4	Avatiu	15	4	3	8	18	39	−21	15	
5	Puaikura	15	2	4	9	12	30	−18	10	
6	Matavera	15	1	5	9	17	38	−21	8	

Updated to match(es) played on 30 November 2021. Source: Cook Islands FA

== Knock-Out Tournament ==
Round 1
5	Puaikura (p)	2 (4)
3	Titikaveka	2 (3)
4	Avatiu	2
6	Matavera	4

Semi-finals
2	Tupapa Maraerenga	4
5	Puaikura	2
1	Nikao Sokattak	10
6	Matavera	1

Final
1	Nikao Sokattak	3
2	Tupapa Maraerenga	0

Round 1

4 December 2021

Puaikura (4) (p)	2-2	Titikaveka (3)

National Stadium, Rarotonga
4 December 2021

Avatiu	2-4	Matavera

National Stadium, Rarotonga

Semi Final

10 December 2021

Tupapa Maraerenga	4-2	Puaikura

National Stadium, Rarotonga
11 December 2021

Nikao Sokattak	10-1	Matavera

National Stadium, Rarotonga

Final

18 December 2021

Nikao Sokattak	3-0	Tupapa Maraerenga
Steven Willis; Hugh Henry; Toru Mateariki

National Stadium, Rarotonga
