= 2020 Cook Islands Round Cup =

Cook Islands Round Cup
- Season: 2020
- Dates: 14 August 2020 – 21 November 2020
- Country: Cook Islands
- Teams: 6
- Champions: Tupapa Maraerenga
- Runner up: Puaikura
- Matches: 30
- Goals: 119 (3.97 per match)
- Top goalscorer: Akiona Tairi (Titikaveka) (18)
- Biggest home win: Tupapa Maraerenga 8–1 Avatiu (22 August 2020)
- Biggest away win: Avatiu 2–7 Puaikura (28 August 2020)
- Highest scoring: Avatiu 2–7 Puaikura (28 August 2020)

The 2020 Cook Islands Round Cup (also known as Vans Premiership due to sponsorship reasons) is the 47th recorded edition of the Cook Islands Round Cup, the top association football league of the Cook Islands organised by the Cook Islands Football Association. The season began on 14 August 2020 with six teams from the island of Rarotonga competing in triple round-robin format. Tupapa Maraerenga added to their championships as they had won the cup since the 2017 Cook Islands Round Cup. The champions of the league will qualify for the 2021 OFC Champions League.

== Teams ==
- Avatiu
- Matavera
- Nikao Sokattak
- Puaikura
- Titikaveka
- Tupapa Maraerenga

== League table ==
Pos	Team	Pld	W	D	L	GF	GA	GD	Pts	Qualification or relegation
1	Tupapa Maraerenga	15	12	2	1	48	16	+32	38	Qualification to OFC Champions League qualifying stage
2	Nikao Sokattak	15	10	1	4	40	18	+22	31	
3	Puaikura	15	7	2	6	31	27	+4	23	
4	Titikaveka	14	5	2	7	34	33	+1	17	
5	Avatiu	14	2	4	8	20	49	−29	10	
6	Matavera	15	1	3	11	17	47	−30	6	

Updated to match(es) played on 28 November 2020. Source: Fiji Football

=== Results table (Home/away) ===
Home \ Away	AVA	MAT	NIK	PUA	TIT	TUP
Avatiu		1–1	0–3	2–2	2–4	1–5
Matavera	1–2		2–1	1–1	1–4	0–4
Nikao Sokattak	7–1	5–0		2–1	5–0	2–2
Puaikura	1–0	5–0	3–1		3–1	1–3
Titikaveka	3–4	5–3	4–2	1–0		4–3
Tupapa Maraerenga	8–1	2–0	1–0	6–0	1–1	

Source: Vans Premiership 20/21
Legend: Blue = home team win; Yellow = draw; Red = away team win.

=== Results table (Neutral) ===
Home \ Away	AVA	MAT	NIK	PUA	TIT	TUP
Avatiu		1–1	0–3		3–4	
Matavera						
Nikao Sokattak	7–1	3–1		3–1		
Puaikura					1–0	
Titikaveka						
Tupapa Maraerenga				3–1		

Source: Vans Premiership 20/21
Legend: Blue = home team win; Yellow = draw; Red = away team win.
