= 2019 Cook Islands Round Cup =

Cook Islands Round Cup
- Season: 2019
- Champions: Tupapa Maraerenga
- OFC Champions League: Tupapa Maraerenga
- Matches: 45
- Goals: 202 (4.49 per match)
- Biggest win: Nikao Sokattak 12-0 Titikaveka
- Highest scoring: Nikao Sokattak 13-2 Avatiu

The 2019 Cook Islands Round Cup (also known as Vans Premiership due to sponsorship reasons) was the 46th recorded edition of the Cook Islands Round Cup, the top association football league of the Cook Islands organised by the Cook Islands Football Association. This season kicked off on 2 August 2019, and was competed by six teams from the island of Rarotonga in triple round-robin format. Tupapa Maraerenga added to their championships as they had won the cup since the 2017 Cook Islands Round Cup. The champions of the league qualified for the 2020 OFC Champions League; they withdrew from that competition in the group stage.

== Teams ==
- Avatiu
- Matavera
- Nikao Sokattak
- Puaikura
- Titikaveka
- Tupapa Maraerenga

== League table ==
Pos	Team	Pld	W	D	L	GF	GA	GD	Pts	Qualification or relegation
1	Tupapa Maraerenga (C, Q)	15	11	3	1	60	12	+48	36	Qualification to OFC Champions League qualifying stage
2	Nikao Sokattak	15	10	2	3	59	23	+36	32	
3	Puaikura	15	6	4	5	35	22	+13	22	
4	Titikaveka	15	5	3	7	23	52	−29	18	
5	Matavera	15	2	3	10	15	44	−29	9	
6	Avatiu	15	2	3	10	19	58	−39	9	

Source: Cook Islands FA
(C) Champions; (Q) Qualified for the phase indicated

== Results ==
ROUND 1 – 2 and 3 August 2019

Titikaveka 4–3 Tupapa Maraerenga
Avatiu 1–4 Nikao Sokattak
Puaikura 4–0 Matavera

ROUND 2 – 9 and 10 August 2019

Tupapa Maraerenga 1–0 Matavera
Nikao Sokattak 2–2 Titikaveka
Avatiu 1-3 Puaikura (postponed due to rain)

ROUND 3 – 16 and 17 August 2019

Tupapa Maraerenga 2–2 Puaikura
Nikao Sokattak 2–1 Matavera
Titikaveka 4–0 Avatiu

ROUND 4 - 23 and 24 August 2019

Puaikura 1-3 Nikao Sokattak
Tupapa Maraerenga 6-0 Avatiu
Titikaveka 3-0 Matavera

ROUND 5 - 20 and 21 September 2019

Nikao Sokkatak 0-4 Tupapa Maraerenga
Matavera 1-0 Avatiu
Puaikura 0-1 Titikaveka

ROUND 6 - 27 and 28 September 2019

Tupapa Marerenga 3-0 Titikaveka
Nikao Sokattak 13-2 Avatiu
Puaikura 1-1 Matavera

ROUND 7 - 4 and 5 October 2019

Avatiu 1-5 Puaikura
Matavera 0-3 Tupapa Maraerenga
Titikaveka 0-4 Nikao Sokattak

ROUND 8 - 11 and 12 October 2019

Matavera 2-10 Nikao Sokattak
Puaikura 1-3 Tupapa Maraerenga
Avatiu 3-0 Titikaveka

ROUND 9 – 18 and 19 October 2019

Nikao Sokattak 2-1 Puaikura
Avatiu 1-4 Tupapa Maraerenga
Titikaveka 2-2 Matavera

ROUND 10 - 25 and 26 October 2019

Nikao Sokattak 1-3 Tupapa Maraerenga
Avatiu 2-2 Matavera
Puaikura 4-2 Titikaveka

ROUND 11 - 01 and 2 November 2019

Nikao Sokattak 3-1 Avatiu
Puaikura 0-3 Matavera
Tupapa Maraerenga 8-0 Titikaveka

ROUND 12 - 07 and 8 November 2019

Nikao Sokattak 12-0 Titikaveka
Puaikura 1-1 Avatiu
Tupapa Maraerenga 9-0 Matavera
