= 1998–99 Cook Islands Round Cup =

Cook Islands Round Cup
- Season: 1998–99
- Champions: Tupapa Maraerenga (3)
- Matches: 20
- Goals: 37 (1.85 per match)

The 1988–89 season of the Cook Islands Round Cup was the twenty fifth recorded season of top flight association football competition in the Cook Islands, with any results between 1951 and 1969 and also in 1986 and 1988–1990 currently unknown. Tupapa Maraerenga won the championship, their third recorded championship, although other sources suggest that their victories in 1992 and 1993 were won by Takuvaine and Avatiu respectively.

== Results ==
=== League table ===
Tupapa Maraerenga topped the league which was played on a single round robin basis.

Pos	Team	Pld	W	D	L	GF	GA	GD	Pts
1	Tupapa (C)	4	3	1	0	11	3	+8	10
2	Avatiu	4	3	0	1	13	4	+9	9
3	Sokattack	4	1	1	2	4	8	−4	4
4	Arorangi	4	1	0	3	4	9	−5	3
5	Matavera	4	1	0	3	5	14	−9	3

Rules for classification: 1) points; 2) goal difference; 3) number of goals scored.
Note: Total goal difference is −1; most likely Arorangi has 5–9 or Tupapa 11–2
(C) Champions
