= 1984 Cook Islands Round Cup =

Cook Islands Round Cup
- Season: 1984
- Champions: Titikaveka (14)
- Matches: 39
- Goals: 81 (2.08 per match)

The 1984 season of the Cook Islands Round Cup was the fifteenth recorded season of top flight association football competition in the Cook Islands, with any results between 1951 and 1969 currently unknown. Titikaveka won the championship, their fourteenth recorded championship, and fourth in a row following a run of nine consecutive titles in the 1970s.

== Results ==
=== League table ===
Matavera topped the group stage which was played on a round robin basis.

Pos	Team	Pld	W	D	L	GF	GA	GD	Pts	Qualification
1	Matavera (Q)	6	5	1	0	11	3	+8	11	Qualified for Knockout stage
2	Titikaveka (Q)	6	4	2	0	20	5	+15	10	Qualified for Knockout stage
3	Avatiu (Q)	6	3	0	3	9	8	+1	6	Qualified for Knockout stage
4	Arorangi (Q)	6	2	2	2	6	9	−3	6	Qualified for Knockout stage
5	Nikao	6	2	1	3	12	11	+1	5	
6	Tupapa	6	0	2	4	6	15	−9	2	
7	Takuvaine	6	1	0	5	3	16	−13	2	

Source: RSSSF.com
Rules for classification: 1) points; 2) goal difference; 3) number of goals scored.
(Q) Qualified for the phase indicated

=== Knockout stage ===
==== Semi finals ====
Matavera	0–2	Arorangi
	Source

Titikaveka	4–1	Avatiu
	Source

==== Final ====
Titikaveka	6–1	Arorangi
	Source
