= 2018 Cook Islands Round Cup =

Cook Islands Round Cup
- Season: 2018
- Champions: Tupapa Maraerenga
- Matches played: 45
- Goals scored: 179 (3.98 per match)

The 2018 Cook Islands Round Cup is the 45th recorded edition of the Cook Islands Round Cup, the top association football league of the Cook Islands organised by the Cook Islands Football Association. This season kicked off on 17 August 2018, and ended on 24 November 2018, and were competed by six teams from the island of Rarotonga in triple round-robin format. Tupapa Maraerenga added to their championships as they had won the cup since the 2017 Cook Islands Round Cup. The champions of the league qualified for the 2019 OFC Champions League.

== Standings ==
Pos	Team	Pld	W	D	L	GF	GA	GD	Pts	Qualification or relegation
1	Tupapa Maraerenga	15	12	1	2	44	17	+27	37	Qualification to 2019 OFC Champions League
2	Nikao Sokattak	15	11	1	3	48	19	+29	34	
3	Puaikura	15	7	1	7	30	23	+7	22	
4	Matavera	15	4	3	8	16	34	−18	15	
5	Avatiu	15	3	3	9	24	39	−15	12	
6	Titikaveka	15	2	3	10	17	47	−30	9	

Source: FIFA
