= 2003 Cook Islands Round Cup =

Cook Islands Round Cup
- Season: 2003
- Champions: Tupapa Maraerenga (5)

The 2003 season of the Cook Islands Round Cup was the thirtieth recorded season of top flight association football competition in the Cook Islands, with any results between 1951 and 1969 and also in 1986 and 1988–1990 currently unknown. Tupapa Maraerenga won the championship, their fifth recorded championship and third in a row, although other sources suggest that their victories in 1992 and 1993 were won by Takuvaine and Avatiu respectively. Nikao Sokattack were runners-up, with Avatiu finishing in third place. This season was the first time in the history of the Round Cup that a team had won three Championships in a row since Titikaveka in 1983.
