= 2004 Cook Islands Round Cup =

Cook Islands Round Cup
- Season: 2004
- Champions: Nikao Sokattack
- 2005 OFC Club Championship: Nikao Sokattack

The 2004 season of the Cook Islands Round Cup was the thirty first recorded season of top flight association football competition in the Cook Islands, with any results between 1951 and 1969 and also in 1986 and 1988–1990 currently unknown. Nikao Sokattack won the championship, their second recorded championship. Tupapa Maraerenga were runners-up, with Matavera finishing in third place following a seven match unbeaten run at the end of the season.

== League table ==
Nikao Sokattack won the league, which was played on a round robin home and away basis, although only a partial table is available.

Pos	Team	Pld	W	D	L	GF	GA	GD	Pts
1	Nikao Sokattack (C)	12	9	2	1	0	0	0	29
2	Tupapa Maraerenga	12	9	1	2	0	0	0	28
3	Matavera	0	0	0	0	0	0	0	0 (Note: Matavera are reported to have finished 1 point ahead of Avatiu but sources indicate they in fact finished with 24 points, ahead of Avatiu on 20)
4	Avatiu	0	0	0	0	0	0	0	0
5	Takuvaine	0	0	0	0	0	0	0	0
6	Puaikura	0	0	0	0	0	0	0	0
7	Titikaveka	0	0	0	0	0	0	0	0

Rules for classification: 1) points; 2) goal difference; 3) number of goals scored.
(C) Champions

== Known results ==
Only partial results are known:

Home \ Away	AVA	MAT	NIK	PUA	TAK	TIT	TUP
Avatiu		4–0	3–6		6–0		
Matavera	2–0		1–6	4–0	1–1	7–0	
Nikao Sokattack	2–2			8–0	3–2		
Puaikura	0–3	0–4					
Takuvaine						5–1	1–2
Titikaveka		0–7					1–1
Tupapa Maraerenga	3–0	6–1		13–0	0–3	11–1	

Updated to match(es) played on 25 October 2012. Source:
Legend: Blue = home team win; Yellow = draw; Red = away team win.
