= 2009 Cook Islands Round Cup =

Cook Islands Round Cup
- Season: 2009
- Champions: Nikao Sokattack
- Matches: 21
- Goals: 77 (3.67 per match)
- Biggest home win: Tupapa Maraerenga 10–2 Titikaveka
- Biggest away win: Arorangi 2–8 Tupapa Maraerenga
- Highest scoring: Tupapa Maraerenga 10–2 Titikaveka

The 2009 season of the Cook Islands Round Cup was the thirty sixth recorded season of top flight association football competition in the Cook Islands, with any results between 1951 and 1969 and also in 1986 and 1988–1990 currently unknown. Nikao Sokattack won the championship, their sixth recorded championship. Tupapa Maraerenga were runners-up, with Arorangi finishing in third place.

== League table ==
Nikao Sokattack won the league, which was played on a single round robin basis due to a late start in the season.

Pos	Team	Pld	W	D	L	GF	GA	GD	Pts
1	Nikao Sokattack (C)	6	6	0	0	21	1	+20	18
2	Tupapa Maraerenga	6	5	0	1	26	6	+20	15
3	Arorangi	6	3	1	2	10	16	−6	10
4	Avatiu	6	1	2	3	5	9	−4	5
5	Takuvaine	6	1	2	3	7	13	−6	5
6	Matavera	6	1	2	3	4	10	−6	5
7	Titikaveka	6	0	1	5	4	22	−18	1

Rules for classification: 1) points; 2) goal difference; 3) number of goals scored.
(C) Champions

== Results ==
Home \ Away	ARO	AVA	MAT	NIK	TAK	TIT	TUP
Arorangi		– (Note: The Arorangi-Avatiu match was awarded 3–0 to Arorangi, although it was initially won 4–0 by Avatiu.)	2–1				2–8
Avatiu	3–0		1–1	0–1		2–1	
Matavera				0–2	2–1		0–4
Nikao Sokattack	6–1					7–0	1–0
Takuvaine	1–1	2–2		0–4			
Titikaveka	0–1		0–0		1–2		
Tupapa Maraerenga		1–0			3–1	10–2	

Updated to match(es) played on 28 November 2009. Source:
Legend: Blue = home team win; Yellow = draw; Red = away team win.
