= 2015 Cook Islands Round Cup =

Cook Islands Round Cup
- Season: 2015
- Champions: Tupapa Maraerenga
- Relegated: None
- 2016 OFC Champions League: Tupapa Maraerenga
- Matches: 42
- Goals: 162 (3.86 per match)
- Biggest home win: Puaikura 10–0 Nikao Sokattak
- Biggest away win: Takuvaine 0–6 Tupapa Maraerenga
- Highest scoring: Puaikura 10–0 Nikao Sokattak

The 2015 Cook Islands Round Cup is the forty-second recorded season of top flight association football competition in the Cook Islands, with any results between 1951 and 1969, and also in 1986 and 1988–1990 currently unknown. Tupapa Maraerenga won the title by four points from second place finishers Titikaveka. This was Tupapa's second title in a row and the fifth time they had won the Round Cup in the last six seasons.

== League table ==
Pos	Team	Pld	W	D	L	GF	GA	GD	Pts	Qualification
1	Tupapa Maraerenga (C)	12	8	1	3	32	19	+13	25	Qualify for 2016 OFC Champions League
2	Titikaveka	12	7	0	5	28	22	+6	21	
3	Puaikura	12	6	2	4	27	17	+10	20	
4	Matavera	12	6	2	4	24	16	+8	20	
5	Nikao Sokattak	12	6	0	6	16	26	−10	18	
6	Takuvaine	12	5	0	7	22	23	−1	15	
7	Avatiu	12	1	1	10	13	39	−26	4	

Updated to match(es) played on 28 September 2013. Source:
Rules for classification: 1) points; 2) goal difference; 3) number of goals scored.
(C) Champions

== Results ==
Home \ Away	AVA	MAT	NIK	PUA	TAK	TIT	TUP
Avatiu		4–3	1–2	1–2	0–4	1–6	1–3
Matavera	1–1		3–1	0–3	2–1	3–0	4–1
Nikao Sokattak	3–2	1–0		2–0	1–0	1–2	2–1
Puaikura	5–0	2–2	10–0		0–5	1–0	1–3
Takuvaine	4–1	0–2	2–1	0–2		2–4 (Note: The Takuvaine v Titikaveka match was also reported as a 4–2 win for Takuvaine.)	0–6
Titikaveka	4–0	0–3	2–1	3–0 (Note: The Titikaveka v Puaikura match was originally a 3–5 victory for Puaikura but was awarded 3–0 to Titikaveka.)	1–3		5–4
Tupapa Maraerenga	2–1	2–1	3–1	1–1	3–1	3–1	

Updated to match(es) played on 28 November 2015. Source:
Legend: Blue = home team win; Yellow = draw; Red = away team win.
