= 2024 Cook Islands Round Cup =

Cook Islands Round Cup
- Season: 2024
- Champions: Tupapa Maraerenga
- OFC Champions League: Tupapa Maraerenga
- Matches: 45
- Goals: 182 (4.04 per match)
- Average goals/game: 4.04
- Biggest win: Puaikura FC 1–9 Tupapa Maraerenga
- Highest scoring: Puaikura FC 1–9 Tupapa Maraerenga

The 2024 Cook Islands Round Cup (also known as the Tower Insurance Premiership for sponsorship reasons) was the 50th recorded edition of the Cook Islands Round Cup, the top association football league of the Cook Islands organised by the Cook Islands Football Association. Many league games took place in front of dozens of spectators.

This season kicked off on 26 July 2024, and was competed by six teams from the island of Rarotonga in a triple round-robin format. Thanks to an unbeaten season, Tupapa Maraerenga won the Round Cup for the third consecutive time, and the nineteenth overall.

== Teams ==
- Avatiu
- Matavera
- Nikao Sokattak
- Puaikura
- Titikaveka
- Tupapa Maraerenga

== League table ==
Pos	Team	Pld	W	D	L	GF	GA	GD	Pts	Qualification or relegation
1	Tupapa Maraerenga (C, Q)	15	13	2	0	56	9	+47	41	Qualification to Champions League qualifying stage
2	Matavera-Ngatangiia	15	7	4	4	33	23	+10	25	
3	Avatiu	15	7	1	7	27	40	−13	22	
4	Puaikura	15	4	5	6	27	32	−5	17	
5	Nikao Sokattak	15	4	3	8	23	44	−21	15	
6	Titikaveka	15	2	1	12	15	33	−18	7	

Source: Cook Islands FA
(C) Champions; (Q) Qualified for the phase indicated

== Results ==
Home \ Away	AVA	MAT	NIK	PUA	TIT	TUP	AVA	MAT	NIK	PUA	TIT	TUP
Avatiu		1–2	4–0	1–7	4–1	0–5			1–1	2–1	3–1	0–4
Matavera-Ngatangiia	3–0		2–2	2–1	3–2	1–2	7–1			1–1	3–2	1–5
Nikao Sokattak	1–6	0–5		3–4	1–4			2–1				2–4
Puaikura	1–2	1–1	3–5		2–1	1–1			1–1		0–1	1–9
Titikaveka		1–1	0–2	0–1		0–4	0–2		1–3			
Tupapa Maraerenga	6–0	2–0	5–0	2–2	1–0				3–0		3–1	

Source: https://www.rsssf.org/tablesc/cook2024.html
Legend: Blue = home team win; Yellow = draw; Red = away team win.
