= 2014 Cook Islands Round Cup =

Cook Islands Round Cup
- Season: 2014
- Champions: Tupapa Maraerenga
- Relegated: None
- Matches: 42
- Goals: 208 (4.95 per match)
- Biggest home win: Tupapa Maraerenga 10–0 Titikaveka; Puaikura 10–0 Titikaveka
- Biggest away win: Titikaveka 0–11 Tupapa Maraerenga
- Highest scoring: Titikaveka 0–11 Tupapa Maraerenga

The 2014 season of the Cook Islands Round Cup is the forty-first recorded season of top flight association football competition in the Cook Islands, with any results between 1951 and 1969 and also in 1986 and 1988–1990 currently unknown.

== League table ==
Pos	Team	Pld	W	D	L	GF	GA	GD	Pts
1	Tupapa Maraerenga (C)	12	9	2	1	59	12	+47	29
2	Puaikura	12	9	2	1	46	10	+36	29
3	Avatiu	12	6	3	3	27	20	+7	21
4	Takuvaine	12	5	1	6	26	27	−1	16
5	Matavera	12	4	1	7	24	34	−10	13
6	Nikao Sokattak	12	3	0	9	14	44	−30	9
7	Titikaveka	12	1	1	10	12	59	−47	4

Updated to match(es) played on 28 September 2013. Source:
Rules for classification: 1) points; 2) goal difference; 3) number of goals scored.
(C) Champions

== Results ==
Home \ Away	AVA	MAT	NIK	PUA	TAK	TIT	TUP
Avatiu		2–1	2–0	0–0	4–1	4–0	0–3
Matavera	3–0		4–1	2–4	3–0	4–2	4–5
Nikao Sokattak	0–7	2–1		1–4	1–5	2–0	0–8
Puaikura	9–1	4–0	6–1		3–0	10–0	2–1
Takuvaine	2–2	5–0	2–1	2–1		4–3	1–2
Titikaveka	2–4	1–1	1–5	1–2	3–1		0–11
Tupapa Maraerenga	1–1	8–1	4–0	1–1	5–2	10–0	

Updated to match(es) played on 28 September 2013. Source:
Legend: Blue = home team win; Yellow = draw; Red = away team win.
