= 2026 Cook Islands Round Cup =

Cook Islands football season

Cook Islands Round Cup
- Season: 2026
- Champions: Nikao Sokattak
- OFC Champions League: Nikao Sokattak
- Matches: 50
- Goals: 184 (3.68 per match)
- Average goals/game: 3.68
- Best player: (Cook Islands) Tione Nand (Avatiu)
- Best goalkeeper: (Cook Islands) Tearii Scheel (Nikao Sokattak)
- Biggest win: Puaikura 0–16 Nikao Sokattak
- Highest scoring: Puaikura 0–16 Nikao Sokattak

The 2026 Cook Islands Round Cup (also known as the Mustonen Constructions Premiership for sponsorship reasons) was the 52th recorded edition of the Cook Islands Round Cup, the top association football league of the Cook Islands organised by the Cook Islands Football Association. Many league games took place in front of dozens of spectators.

This season kicked off on 17 July 2026, and was competed by six teams from the island of Rarotonga in a triple round-robin format.

== Teams ==
- Avatiu
- Matavera-Ngatangiia
- Nikao Sokattak
- Puaikura
- Titikaveka
- Tupapa Maraerenga

== League table ==
Pos	Team	Pld	W	D	L	GF	GA	GD	Pts	Qualification or relegation
1	Nikao Sokattak	15	12	2	1	77	5	+72	38	Qualification to Champions League qualifying stage
2	Tupapa Maraerenga	15	12	1	2	68	12	+56	37	
3	Avatiu	15	10	1	4	66	24	+42	31	
4	Titikaveka	15	4	0	11	15	36	−21	12	
5	Matavera-Ngatangiia	15	4	0	11	16	63	−47	12	
6	Puaikura	15	1	0	14	7	108	−101	3	

Source: RSSSF

== Results ==
Home \ Away	AVA	MAT	NIK	PUA	TIT	TUP	AVA	MAT	NIK	PUA	TIT	TUP	AVA	MAT	NIK	PUA	TIT	TUP
Avatiu		5–0		7–0		2–3			0–1		1–3	2–9			2–2	11–1	4–0	1–3
Matavera-Ngatangiia					1–3		1–7		1–9	2–1	0–4	0–2			0–11	2–3		2–5
Nikao Sokattak				16–0		2–0	1–0	9–1		6–0	5–0		2–2	11–0		11–0	4–1	0–0
Puaikura			0–16		0–1		0–7	1–2	0–6		0–4	0–14	1–11	3–2	0–11			
Titikaveka		3–1		1–0			3–1	4–0	0–5	4–0		0–4	0–4		1–4			
Tupapa Maraerenga	3–2	2–0	0–2				9–2	5–2	0–0	14–0	4–0		3–1					

Source: RSSSF
Legend: Blue = home team win; Yellow = draw; Red = away team win.

== Player awards ==
=== Player of the season ===
Name	Ranking	Position	Club
(Cook Islands) Tione Nand	1st	Winger	Avatiu
(Vanuatu) Julius David	2nd	Winger	Nikao Sokattak
(Solomon Islands) Alphy Ngire	3rd	Striker	Nikao Sokattak
(Cook Islands) Paavo Mustonen	4th	Midfielder	Tupapa Maraerenga
(Cook Islands) Tearii Scheel	5th	Goalkeeper	Nikao Sokattak
(Cook Islands) Grover Harmon	6th	Midfielder	Tupapa Maraerenga
(Cook Islands) Leo Nand	7th	Striker	Avatiu
(Cook Islands) Marcus Gibbens	8th	Striker	Tupapa Maraerenga
(Cook Islands) Jayden Angene	9th	Midfielder	Nikao Sokattak
(Cook Islands) Andrew Teena	10th	Striker	Avatiu

=== U18 Young player of the season ===
Name	Ranking	Position	Club
(Cook Islands) Tearii Scheel	1st	Goalkeeper	Nikao Sokattak
(Cook Islands) Leo Nand	2nd	Striker	Avatiu
(Cook Islands) Jayden Angene	3rd	Midfielder	Nikao Sokattak
(Cook Islands) Taianu Williams	4th	Defender	Nikao Sokattak
(Cook Islands) Joseph Rua	5th	Midfielder	Avatiu
(Cook Islands) Teurukura Tutai	–	Defender	Avatiu
(Cook Islands) Tana Raina	–	Defender	Nikao Sokattak
(Cook Islands) Aiga Samania	–	Defender	Nikao Sokattak
(Cook Islands) Harold Rasmussen	–	Striker	Nikao Sokattak
(Cook Islands) Rohan Vano	–	Defender	Puaikura

=== Golden glove ===
Name	Ranking	Club
(Cook Islands) Tearii Scheel	1st	Nikao Sokattak
(Cook Islands) Ioane Moore	2nd	Titikaveka
(Cook Islands) Moana Rakei	3rd	Tupapa Maraerenga
(Cook Islands) Kenneth Rota-Ariki	–	Matavera
(Cook Islands) Tuiate Tuariki	–	Puaikura
