= 2025 Cook Islands Cup =

Cook Islands Cup

The 2025 Cook Islands Cup was the annual domestic knockout football competition in the Cook Islands, organised by the Cook Islands Football Association. The tournament featured six teams from the 2025 Cook Islands Round Cup season.

Tupapa Maraerenga won the competition, defeating Nikao Sokattak 5–0 in the final.

== Knockout stage ==
Round 1
5	Puaikura	1
3	Titikaveka	0
4	Avatiu	1
6	Matavera	2

Semi-finals
2	Tupapa Maraerenga	2
5	Puaikura	1
1	Nikao Sokattak	3
6	Matavera	2

Final
2	Tupapa Maraerenga	5
1	Nikao Sokattak	0

== Round 1 ==
1 November 2025

Puaikura	1–0	Titikaveka

CIFA Academy, Rarotonga
1 November 2025

Avatiu	1–2	Matavera

CIFA Academy, Rarotonga

== Semi-finals ==
8 November 2025

Tupapa Maraerenga	2–1	Puaikura

CIFA Academy, Rarotonga
8 November 2025

Nikao Sokattak	3–2	Matavera

CIFA Academy, Rarotonga

== Final ==
15 November 2025

Tupapa Maraerenga	5–0	Nikao Sokattak
Campbell Best; Temaruata Tearaitoa; Shane Tuteru, John Noovao

CIFA Academy, Rarotonga
