= 2005 Cook Islands Round Cup =

Cook Islands Round Cup
- Season: 2005
- Champions: Nikao Sokattack
- 2006 OFC Club Championship: Nikao Sokattack

The 2005 season of the Cook Islands Round Cup was the thirty second recorded season of top flight association football competition in the Cook Islands, with any results between 1951 and 1969 and also in 1986 and 1988–1990 currently unknown. Nikao Sokattack won the championship, their third recorded championship. Either Tupapa Maraerenga or Matavera were runners up, with Takuvaine finishing in third place following a seven match unbeaten run at the end of the season.
