= 2007 Cook Islands Round Cup =

Cook Islands Round Cup
- Season: 2007
- Champions: Tupapa Maraerenga

The 2007 season of the Cook Islands Round Cup was the thirty fourth recorded season of top flight association football competition in the Cook Islands, with any results between 1951 and 1969 and also in 1986 and 1988–1990 currently unknown. Tupapa Maraerenga won the championship, their seventh recorded championship although other sources suggest that their victories in 1992 and 1993 were won by Takuvaine and Avatiu respectively.
