= 1987 Cook Islands Round Cup =

Cook Islands Round Cup
- Season: 1987
- Champions: Arorangi (2)

The 1987 season of the Cook Islands Round Cup was the seventeenth recorded season of top flight association football competition in the Cook Islands, with any results between 1951 and 1969 and also in 1986 currently unknown. Arorangi won the championship, their second recorded championship, and only the third recorded time since the inaugural season in 1950 that the title had not been won by Titikaveka, following Avatiu's victory in the 1980 season and Arorangi's in 1985.
