= Teina Savage =

Cook Islands athlete

Personal information
- Full name: Teina Desmond Maka Beritane Kala Hanohano Savage
- Date of birth: 23 August 1986 (age 40)
- Positions: Left back; centre back

Team information
- Current team: Avatiu

Senior career*
Years	Team	Apps	(Gls)
–2017	Takuvaine		
2018–2025	Tupapa Maraerenga		
2026–	Avatiu		

Managerial career
- 2022–2023: Cook Islands (assistant)
- 2023–2025: Tupapa Maraerenga (assistant)
- 2025: Cook Islands U16
- 2025–: Cook Islands FA (treasurer)
- * Club domestic league appearances and goals

Teina Desmond Savage (born 23 August 1986) is a Cook Islands association football player, treasurer, manager and referee, rugby league footballer and rugby union footballer for Avatiu FC, the Tupapa Maraerenga Panthers and the Cook Islands Football Association. He is of Niuean descent, hence his surname Savage.

He formerly capptained the Cook Islands national rugby league nines team and represented the Cook Islands national rugby sevens team and was the assistant manager for the Cook Islands national football team during the 2022 FIFA World Cup and 2023 Pacific Games.

== Association football career ==
Savage's first recorded club was in 2012 with Takuvaine, the counterpart of his rugby club. He recorded 8 Round Cup appearances, scoring none.

In the 2013 season, he would score on the season opener against Avatiu in a 7–4 victory. It would be his only goal of the season as he appeared in at least 3 matches.

He joined Tupapa Maraerenga in 2018, where he would feature in their OFC Champions League squad in the qualifying and finals tournament. He would make 2 appearances, 1 in the qualifying stage where he started against Veitongo in a 9–2 victory, receiving a yellow card in the 47th minute and being substituted out in the 61st minute, and a substitute appearance in the 86th minute against Ba in a 4–1 defeat.

In the 2020 season, he scored 1 goal as a substitute against Puaikura in a 6–0 victory. He appeared 9 times, scoring 1.

He played in the 2024 OFC Men's Champions League qualifying stage, coming on in the 86th minute against Vaiala Tonga in Tupapa's record 14–0 win, and the 3–2 win over Veitongo in the 82nd minute.

== Personal life ==
His wife Mii Piri-Savage was the first woman to manage in the OFC Men's Champions League finals tournament.

== Career statistics ==
=== Club ===
As of 21 November 2026

Appearances and goals by club, season and competition
Club	Season	League			Cup		Shield		Continental		Other		Total	
Club	Season	Division	Apps	Goals	Apps	Goals	Apps	Goals	Apps	Goals	Apps	Goals	Apps	Goals
Takuvaine	2012	Round Cup	8	0	—	—	—	—	—	—	—	—	8	0
Takuvaine	2013	Round Cup	3+	1+	—	—	—	—	—	—	—	—	3+	1+
Takuvaine	2014	Round Cup	—	—	—	—	—	—	—	—	—	—	—	—
Takuvaine	2015	Round Cup	—	—	—	—	—	—	—	—	—	—	—	—
Takuvaine	2016	Round Cup	—	—	—	—	—	—	—	—	—	—	—	—
Takuvaine	2017	Round Cup	—	—	—	—	—	—	—	—	—	—	—	—
Total			12	1	—	—	—	—	—	—	—	—	12	1
Tupapa Maraerenga	2018	Round Cup	—	—	—	—	—	—	2 (Note: Appearances in OFC Men's Champions League)	0	—	—	2	0
Tupapa Maraerenga	2019	Round Cup	—	—	—	—	—	—	—	—	—	—	—	—
Tupapa Maraerenga	2020	Round Cup	9	1	—	—	—	—	—	—	—	—	9	1
Tupapa Maraerenga	2021	Round Cup	—	—	—	—	—	—	—	—	—	—	—	—
Tupapa Maraerenga	2022	Round Cup	—	—	—	—	—	—	—	—	—	—	—	—
Tupapa Maraerenga	2023	Round Cup	—	—	—	—	—	—	—	—	—	—	—	—
Tupapa Maraerenga	2024	Round Cup	—	—	—	—	—	—	2 (Note: Appearances in OFC Men's Champions League)	0	—	—	2	0
Tupapa Maraerenga	2025	Round Cup	—	—	—	—	—	—	—	—	—	—	—	—
Total			9	1	—	—	—	—	4 (Note: Appearances in OFC Men's Champions League)	0	—	—	13	1
Avatiu	2026	Round Cup	—	—	—	—	—	—	—	—	—	—	—	—
Career total			21	2	0	0	0	0	4 (Note: Appearances in OFC Men's Champions League)	0	0	0	25	2

== Honours ==
Tupapa Maraerenga

- Cook Islands Round Cup: 2018, 2019, 2020, 2022, 2023, 2024, 2025
- Cook Islands Cup: 2018, 2019, 2023, 2024, 2025

Takuvaine

- Cook Islands Cup: 2014
