= 2006 Cook Islands Round Cup =

Cook Islands Round Cup
- Season: 2006
- Champions: Nikao Sokattack

The 2006 season of the Cook Islands Round Cup was the thirty third recorded season of top flight association football competition in the Cook Islands, with any results between 1951 and 1969 and also in 1986 and 1988–1990 currently unknown. Nikao Sokattack won the championship, their third recorded championship. Takuvaine were runners up, with Tupapa Maraerenga finishing in third place. This was the third time that a team had won a hat trick of titles after Titikaveka and Tupapa.
