= 2013 Cook Islands Round Cup =

Cook Islands Round Cup
- Season: 2013
- Champions: Puaikura
- Relegated: None
- 2014–15 OFC Champions League: Puaikura
- Matches: 42
- Goals: 254 (6.05 per match)
- Biggest home win: Puaikura 14–1 Takuvaine
- Biggest away win: Matavera 1–13 Puaikura
- Highest scoring: Titikaveka 11–5 Takuvaine

The 2013 season of the Cook Islands Round Cup is the fortieth recorded season of top flight association football competition in the Cook Islands, with any results between 1951 and 1969 and also in 1986 and 1988–1990 currently unknown.

== League table ==
Pos	Team	Pld	W	D	L	GF	GA	GD	Pts	Qualification
1	Puaikura (C)	12	9	3	0	80	11	+69	30	Qualify for 2014–15 OFC Champions League
2	Tupapa Maraerenga	12	8	3	1	45	9	+36	27	
3	Nikao Sokattack	12	8	2	2	38	16	+22	26	
4	Matavera	12	3	4	5	25	41	−16	13	
5	Avatiu	12	3	2	7	23	49	−26	11	
6	Titikaveka	12	2	1	9	24	68	−44	7	
7	Takuvaine	12	1	1	10	19	60	−41	4	

Updated to match(es) played on 28 September 2013. Source:
Rules for classification: 1) points; 2) goal difference; 3) number of goals scored.
(C) Champions

== Results ==
Home \ Away	AVA	MAT	NIK	PUA	TAK	TIT	TUP
Avatiu		2–2	1–6	1–11	2–1	5–1	2–5
Matavera	2–2		1–2	1–13	5–2	4–2	0–3 (Note: Matavera v Tupapa Maraerenga match awarded 0–3 to Tupapa. Matavera did not show.)
Nikao Sokattack	4–0	4–4		1–2	3–2	8–1	0–1
Puaikura	5–0	3–2	1–1		14–1	11–0	1–1
Takuvaine	7–4	0–3	1–4	0–8		0–8	0–3
Titikaveka	0–3	1–1	2–4	2–10	11–5		1–9
Tupapa Maraerenga	6–2	5–0	0–1	1–1	0–0	8–0	

Updated to match(es) played on 28 September 2013. Source:
Legend: Blue = home team win; Yellow = draw; Red = away team win.
