= 1981 Cook Islands Round Cup =

Cook Islands Round Cup
- Season: 1981
- Champions: Titikaveka (11)

The 1981 season of the Cook Islands Round Cup was the twelfth recorded season of top flight association football competition in the Cook Islands, with any results between 1951 and 1969 currently unknown. Titikaveka won the championship, their eleventh recorded championship, and the title back from Avatiu who won the championship the previous season.
