= 2000 Cook Islands Round Cup =

Cook Islands Round Cup
- Season: 2000
- Champions: Nikao Sokattack (1)

The 2000 season of the Cook Islands Round Cup was the twenty seventh recorded season of top flight association football competition in the Cook Islands, with any results between 1951 and 1969 and also in 1986 and 1988–1990 currently unknown. Nikao Sokattack won the championship, their first recorded championship. Tupapa Maraerenga were runners-up.

== Awards ==
- Teiva Tauira, playing for Avatiu won the player of the year award.
