= Tremaine Rimene-Albrett =

Cook Islands association football player (born 2002)

Personal information
- Date of birth: 3 September 2002 (age 24)
- Place of birth: Masterton, New Zealand
- Positions: Midfielder; striker

Youth career
- 2016–2019: Douglas Villa

Senior career*
Years	Team	Apps	(Gls)
2019–2022	Douglas Villa		
2022	Wainuiomata	4	(0)
2022–2023	Miramar Rangers		
2023–2025	Douglas Villa	17	(15)
2026–	Western Suburbs	4	(0)
2026	Tupapa Maraerenga	1	(0)

International career^{‡}
2023–	Cook Islands	8	(2)
- * Club domestic league appearances and goals as of August 2026 ‡ National team caps and goals as of 11:53, 1 October 2026 (UTC)

Tremaine Rimene-Albrett (born 3 September 2002) is a Cook Islands international footballer. Born in New Zealand, he plays for the Cook Islands national team.

== Club career ==
As a youth, Rimene-Albrett was successful in several sports before eventually deciding to focus primarily on football. He joined Douglas Villa AFC, then known as Douglas Villa Magpies, at age 14. The team went undefeated in the local league in 2019 and earned promotion to the Capital League Four, the seventh tier of the New Zealand football league system. That season, he captained the side and scored in the promotion play-off against Otaki Purutaitama.

In the team's first match in their new league the following season, the player scored two goals, including a long-range shot from 50m, en route to a win over Western Suburbs. The win continued a streak of thirty-eight consecutive victories dating back to April 2018. The club won again on the following matchday with Rimene-Albrett opening the scoring in a 2–1 victory over Island Bay United. During the 2021 season, the club earned another promotion, this time to the Capital League Two starting in 2022, with Rimene-Albrett as a prominent member of the club.

In March 2022 it was announced that Rimene-Albert would join Wainuiomata AFC of the Capital Premier. He participated in league matches with the club, including a 3–1 victory over Wellington United in Round Two and a 1–0 victory over Upper Hutt City FC later in April 2022. Later in the 2022 season, he moved to Miramar Rangers of the Central League. He made one league appearance for the club's first team that season, in additional to playing for the reserve side. His lone league appearance came on 25 May 2022 as a substitute in a draw with Napier City Rovers.

By 2023, Rimene-Albrett had returned to Douglas Villa in the Capital League Two. He scored a hat-trick in a 7–1 victory over Island Bay United in April 2023. The win was the club's first in the league that season. Five days later, the striker scored his second hattrick in as many matches as the club defeated Stokes Valley FC 10–2. After scoring two goals in the final eight minutes of a 2–2 draw with Wellington Marist in late May, Douglas Villa manager Mark Taylor said of him, "Rimene-Albrett was a threat; he was causing them problems throughout, and when he came alive, he was really effective." On 5 August 2023, the player scored another two goals against Stokes Valley FC to secure second place in the league and earn promotion to the Capital League One the next season. In total, Rimene-Albrett scored fifteen league goals in 2023, the third-highest in the league. Following the campaign, he was given the Goal of the Season award at the annual Capital Football awards ceremony for his long-range bicycle kick into the top right corner in a 4–2 win over Stokes Valley to secure promotion. He became the first-ever Douglas Villa player to earn an international call-up while with the club when he was selected by the Cook Islands in November 2023.

In 2024, Rimene-Albrett remained with Douglas Villa as the club competed in the Capital Football pyramid. He scored in the club's Capital Division One matches against Victoria University, Wellington Marist, Island Bay United Reserves and North Wellington FC Reserves.

By early 2025, Rimene-Albrett had joined Tupapa Maraerenga of the Cook Islands. He featured in the club's OFC Champions League qualifying campaign, appearing in matches against Royal Puma and Vaipuna. He subsequently returned to New Zealand, continuing with Douglas Villa during the 2025 Central League 2 season, when he scored nine league goals.

By 2026, Rimene-Albrett had joined Western Suburbs. He also temporarily returned to Tupapa Maraerenga for the OFC Men's Champions League, where he scored three goals during the group stage, one against Lae City, another against Rewa and the last one against Galaxy, finishing the tournament as Tupapa's leading scorer.

He made his Round Cup debut against Nikao Sokattak in a 3–0 defeat.

== International career ==
As a 21-year-old, Rimene-Albrett was called up to the Cook Islands national team for the 2023 Pacific Games. He would have the opportunity to make his debut in the team's group stage matches against Tonga and New Caledonia. He made his debut against Tonga in the team's opening match on 21 November 2023 during the 2023 Pacific Games. After entering the match as a second-half substitute, he scored his first international goal, which was also the game-winning goal in the eighth minute of stoppage time to secure the 2–1 victory.

=== International goals ===
Scores and results list the Cook Islands' goal tally first.

No.	Date	Venue	Opponent	Score	Result	Competition
1.	21 November 2023	SIFF Academy Field, Honiara, Solomon Islands	Tonga	2–1	2–1	2023 Pacific Games
2.	30 September 2026	CIFA Field, Matavera, Cook Islands	Tahiti	2–0	3–2	Friendly
Last updated 1 October 2026

=== International career statistics ===
As of match played 1 October 2026

Cook Islands
Year	Apps	Goals
2023	2	1
2024	4	0
2025	2	1
Total	8	2

== Waka ama ==
Rimene-Albrett also participates in waka ama. At age 15, he was selected to represent New Zealand at the 2018 Va'a World Sprint Club Championships, the sport's biggest event, held in Tahiti in July 2018.

== Personal life ==
Rimene-Albrett attended Makoura College in his hometown of Masterton. He is the son of rugby union player Patrick Harding-Rimene, all-time top scorer for Wairarapa Bush. He is of Cook Islander descent through his maternal grandmother who was born on Rarotonga.
