= Tahiri Elikana =

Cook Islands footballer

Personal information
- Date of birth: 14 September 1988 (age 38)
- Place of birth: Cook Islands
- Position: Goalkeeper

Youth career
- 2000: Tupapa Maraerenga

Senior career*
Years	Team	Apps	(Gls)
–2016	Avatiu		
2016–2023	Nikao Sokattak		
2019	Tupapa Maraerenga		
2020	Tupapa Maraerenga		
2024–2025	Papakura City		
2026	Tupapa Maraerenga	1	(1)

International career^{‡}
2011–	Cook Islands	13	(0)

Managerial career
- 2021–2023: Cook Islands U17
- 2021–2023: Cook Islands U20
- 2024–: Papakura City (director of football)
- * Club domestic league appearances and goals as of August 2026 ‡ National team caps and goals as of 2026

Tahiri Elikana (born 14 September 1988) is an international footballer from Cook Islands who plays as a goalkeeper. He is from Pukapuka and Rakahanga.

== Playing style ==
Elikana, who originally played as a defender, started playing as a goalkeeper in 2015 when the Cook Islands national football team had a goalkeeper crisis and he had to fill in. He would continue playing as a goalkeeper after. He can also operate as a forward and midfielder and is known for his penalties.

== Career statistics ==
As of 30 May 2021

Cook Islands
Year	Apps	Goals
2011	7	0
2012	0	0
2013	0	0
2014	0	0
2015	2	0
Total	9	0
