= Dylan Connolly (footballer, born 2000) =

Irish footballer (born 2000)

Personal information
- Full name: Dylan Christopher Connolly
- Date of birth: 16 May 2000 (age 26)
- Place of birth: Celbridge, Ireland
- Height: 1.79 m (5 ft 10 in)
- Position: Defender

Team information
- Current team: Athlone Town
- Number: 7

Youth career
- –2018: Shelbourne
- 2018: Drogheda United

Senior career*
Years	Team	Apps	(Gls)
2020–2022	Lucan United		
2024	Tupapa Maraerenga	0	(0)
2024	Birkenhead United	27	(1)
2025–2026	Auckland City	26	(0)
2026–	Athlone Town	7	(0)

International career^{‡}
2023	Republic of Ireland Amateurs	2	(0)
- * Club domestic league appearances and goals as of 6 October 2026 ‡ National team caps and goals as of 11 June 2023

Dylan Christopher Connolly (born 16 May 2000) is an Irish footballer who plays as a defender for League of Ireland First Division club Athlone Town.

== Club career ==
=== Early career ===
Connolly started his youth football for the Shelbourne academy before joining the Drogheda United academy in 2018. In 2020, Connolly signed for Lucan United in the Leinster Senior League.

=== Tupapa Maraerenga ===
In 2024, Connolly joined Cook Islands side Tupapa Maraerenga for the 2024 OFC Champions League.

=== Birkenhead United ===
Connolly signed for Birkenhead United on 22 January 2024, after previously training with them at the end of 2023. He joining the squad after competing with Tupapa Maraerenga in the qualifying stage of the OFC Champions League. He made his debut on 23 March 2024, against Western Springs in the Northern League. Connolly helped Birkenhead United qualify for the 2024 New Zealand National League grand final, eventually losing 2–1 to Auckland City after extra time.

=== Auckland City ===
On 28 January 2025, Connolly signed for Auckland City for the 2025 Northern League. In June 2025, Connolly was named in Auckland City's squad for the 2025 FIFA Club World Cup, the club's tenth appearance in the tournament. He played in the final group game, a 1–1 draw with Boca Juniors. This was their first non-defeated result since the 2014 edition.

=== Athlone Town ===
In August 2026, it was announced that Connolly had signed for League of Ireland First Division club Athlone Town.

== International career ==
On 7 June 2023, Connolly was named in the Republic of Ireland amateurs squad for the 2023 UEFA Regions' Cup. He made his debut on 9 June 2023 against Galicia. He made two appearances at the tournament, as Republic of Ireland were eliminated in the group stage of the final tournament.

== Personal life ==
A semi-professional footballer, Connolly also works as a physiotherapist and football coach in Auckland. While living in Dublin, he attended Trinity College Dublin. His younger brother, Aaron, also plays football for Athlone Town in the League of Ireland First Division.

== Career statistics ==
=== Club ===
As of match played 2 October 2026

Appearances and goals by club, season and competition
Club	Season	League			National Cup		Continental		Other		Total	
Club	Season	Division	Apps	Goals	Apps	Goals	Apps	Goals	Apps	Goals	Apps	Goals
Tupapa Maraerenga	2024	Round Cup	0	0	0	0	3 (Note: Appearances and goals in the OFC Champions League.)	4	—		3	4
Birkenhead United	2024	National League	27	1	5	0	—		—		32	1
Auckland City	2025	National League	12	0	1	0	3	0	1 (Note: Appearance in the FIFA Club World Cup)	0	17	0
Auckland City	2026	National League	14	0	0	0	0	0	—		14	0
Auckland City	Total		26	0	1	0	3	0	1	0	67	5
Athlone Town	2026	LOI First Division	7	0	1	0	—		—		8	0
Career total			60	1	7	0	6	4	1	0	74	5

== Honours ==
Auckland City

- OFC Champions League: 2025
