= Oscar Wichman =

Cook Islands footballer (born 2005)

Personal information
- Full name: Oscar Teariki Albert Wichman
- Date of birth: 1 July 2005 (age 21)
- Position: Defender

Team information
- Current team: Tupapa Maraerenga

Senior career*
Years	Team	Apps	(Gls)
2020–2025	Puaikura		
2023	→ Tupapa Maraerenga (loan)		
2025	→ Tupapa Maraerenga (loan)		
2025	Tupapa Maraerenga		

International career^{‡}
2022	Cook Islands U19	3	(0)
2024–	Cook Islands	3	(0)
2023–	Cook Islands Touch		
- * Club domestic league appearances and goals as of 27 February 2026 ‡ National team caps and goals as of 27 February 2026

Oscar Teariki Albert Wichman (born 1 July 2005) is an international footballer and touch rugby footballer from the Cook Islands. He plays as a defender for the Cook Islands.

== International career ==
He played for the Cook Islands at 2026 FIFA World Cup qualifiers and the 2024 OFC Men's Nations Cup.

He played for the Cook Islands at the 2023 Pacific Games.

== Career statistics ==
=== International ===
Cook Islands
Year	Apps	Goals
2024	3	0
Total	3	0

Statistics accurate as of match played 27 February 2026

== Honours ==
Tupapa Maraerenga

- Cook Islands Round Cup: 2025
- Cook Islands Cup: 2025
