= 1985 Cook Islands Round Cup =

Cook Islands Round Cup
- Season: 1985
- Champions: Arorangi (1)

The 1985 season of the Cook Islands Round Cup was the sixteenth recorded season of top flight association football competition in the Cook Islands, with any results between 1951 and 1969 currently unknown. Arorangi won the championship, their first recorded championship, and only the second recorded time since the inaugural season in 1950 that the title had not been won by Titikaveka, following Avatiu's victory in the 1980 season.
