= Nathan Tisam =

Cook Islands footballer (born 1988)

Personal information
- Full name: Nathan Tisam
- Date of birth: 6 July 1988 (age 38)
- Place of birth: Cook Islands
- Height: 1.72 m (5 ft 8 in)
- Position: Defender

Team information
- Current team: Avatiu

Senior career*
Years	Team	Apps	(Gls)
2005–2012	Nikao Sokattak		
2013–	Avatiu		

International career^{‡}
2007–	Cook Islands	8	(0)
- * Club domestic league appearances and goals as of 2 September 2015 ‡ National team caps and goals as of 2 September 2015

Nathan Tisam (born 6 July 1988) in the Cook Islands is a footballer who plays as a defender. He currently plays for Nikao Sokattack F.C. in the Cook Islands Round Cup and the Cook Islands national football team.

== Career statistics ==
=== International ===
Cook Islands
Year	Apps	Goals
2007	2	0
2008	0	0
2009	0	0
2010	0	0
2011	5	0
2012	0	0
2013	0	0
2014	0	0
2015	1	0
Total	8	0

Statistics accurate as of match played 2 September 2015

== Honours ==
Nikao Sokattak

- Cook Islands Round Cup (2): 2008, 2009
- Cook Islands Cup (4): 2008, 2010, 2011, 2012
