= Grover Harmon =

Cook Islands footballer

Personal information
- Full name: Grover Harmon
- Date of birth: 9 August 1989 (age 37)
- Position: Midfielder

Team information
- Current team: Tupapa Maraerenga
- Number: 13

Senior career*
Years	Team	Apps	(Gls)
2011–2014	Tupapa Maraerenga		
- Papatoetoe
2015–2016	Yagoona Lions		
2016	Puaikura	11	(4)
2016–	Tupapa Maraerenga		
2022	→ Nikao Sokattak (loan)		

International career^{‡}
2009–	Cook Islands	19	(1)

Managerial career
- 2020: Tupapa Maraerenga
- 2016–: Tupapa Maraerenga (president)
- 2024–: Cook Islands (president)
- * Club domestic league appearances and goals as of 11 January 2026 ‡ National team caps and goals as of 26 September 2026

Grover Harmon (born 9 August 1989) is an international footballer, football administrator and coach from the Cook Islands. He plays as a midfielder for Tupapa Maraerenga in the Cook Islands Round Cup and the Cook Islands national football team.

== Early life ==
Harmon is the 1st son of former Cook Islands Football Association president, Lee Harmon. He is also the brother of Lee Harmon Jr., who has also played for Tupapa Maraerenga, with whom he equalled the record for most goals in an international club match.

== Playing career ==
Harmon started his career with Tupapa Maraerenga, starring as arguably their best player for most of his career.

He has featured in the OFC Men's Champions League 11 times for clubs from the Cook Islands, scoring 13 goals in his 47 matches played. He first featured in the Champions League with Tupapa during the 2012–13 OFC Champions League and latest the 2026 OFC Men's Champions League.

== International career ==
He played for Cook Islands on 18 occasions, making his debut against Tonga on the 11 June 2009, and scoring his first and only goal against Tonga on 27 November 2011 in he leadup to Brazil 2014. He has since stayed as a regular player in squad, latest being included in their 2026 FIFA World Cup qualification campaign, playing the full match against both Tonga and American Samoa, the latter of which he got an assist to Siaosi Kaufononga.

== Career statistics ==
=== International ===
Cook Islands
Year	Apps	Goals
2009	1	0
2010	0	0
2011	7	1
2012	0	0
2013	0	0
2014	0	0
2015	3	0
2022	1	0
2023	2	0
2024	4	0
2025	0	0
2026	1	0
Total	19	1

Statistics accurate as of match played 26 September 2026

=== International goals ===
Scores and results list. Cook Islands's goal tally first.

#	Date	Venue	Opponent	Score	Result	Competition
1.	26 November 2011	National Soccer Stadium, Apia, Samoa	Tonga	1–1	1–2	2014 FIFA World Cup qualification

== Honours ==
Nikao Sokattak

- Cook Islands Round Cup: 2011, 2012, 2014
- Cook Islands Cup: 2013
