= Rugby sevens at the 2004 Commonwealth Youth Games =

Rugby Sevens at the II Commonwealth Youth Games
- Dates: 29 November – 4 December
- Host city: Bendigo, Australia
- Venue: Queen Elizabeth Oval
- Events: 1
- Participation: 96 athletes from 8 nations

Rugby Sevens at the 2004 Commonwealth Youth Games was held in Bendigo, Victoria in the months of November and December. This was the first time Rugby Sevens was introduced in the games. All games took place the Queen Elizabeth Oval.

The format was two pools of 4 teams with classification rounds to follow.

== Squad Lists ==
Participating teams and rosters
Australia	England	Samoa	Singapore	Fiji	South Africa	Scotland	Cook Islands
Josh Afu; Will Brock; Jono Jenkins; Jason Lagaali; Joshua Parry-Brett; Johsua Holmes; Charlie Fetaoi; Brando Vaaulu Stapleton; Steven Hillman; Christian Lealiifano; John Byrne	Mathew Tait; Adam Powell; Jordan Turner-Hall; Mike Myerscough; Alex Rae; Uche Odouza; Anthony Allen; Dominic Waldouck; Dominic Shabbo; Danny Cipriani; Danny Care; Ryan Lamb	Alvin Tavana; Siaosi Akerei; Asotasi Keleni; Laasia Paulo; Penelope Lafaele; Timoteo Iosua; Paul Perez; Faileilei Mulipola; Morgan Salesa; Taulagi Afamasaga; Iaone Iaone; Toma Tumanuvao	Gabriel Lee; Ibrahim Ramlee; Reiner Leong; Darius Sit; Loh Wei Liang; Bryan Ng; Leon Chan; Derek Chan; Daniel Chia; Hadizan Jaaman; Justin Koh; Eugene Wee	Apenisa Ratugoleavanua; Aseri Robarobalevu; Koro Koroibuleka; Sailosi Robanaqica; Simione Leawere; Matalasi Ucutabua; Tevita Bainivalu; Sisa Waqa; Napolioni Vonowale; Manu Nawalu; Isireli Temo; Rupeni Bani	Pieter Myburgh; Deon Stagman; Malingiaa Nkosi; Hilton Lobberts; Ricardo Coy; Shandre Frolick; Terry Jacobs; Marlon Lewis; Andisa Goobo; Mandilakhe Tile; Kruger Van Heerden; Jerome Williams	Scott Burnett; Sean Crombie; Calum Forrester; Ross Rennie; Andrew Easson; Lee Kibbie; Jamie Hood; James King; Chris Lawson; Dave McCall; Jonny Alston; Tane Jericevich	Trends Poila; Ngatamaine Rongo; Keu Mataroa; Anthony Mataroa; Te Pou Moekaa; Sam Marii; Patrick Maui-Kapi; Spoon Marsters; Agostini Heather; Haaron Maui; George Woonton; Teina Savage

== Pool Stage ==
Points are awarded 4 points for a win, 2 points for a draw and 0 points for a defeat. There is a bonus winning point for scoring 4 or more tries and a bonus losing point for a defeat of 7 points or fewer. A tiebreak was first decided on the head to head and then by tries scored.

=== Pool A ===
Team	Pts	Pld	W	D	L	T	BP
1. England (ENG)	14	3	3	0	0	15	2
2. Australia (AUS)	11	3	2	0	1	12	3
3. Samoa (SAM)	5	3	1	0	2	13	1
4. Singapore (SIN)	0	3	0	0	3	1	0

- Samoa 0-22 Australia
- England 43-0 Singapore
- Samoa 70-0 Singapore
- England 17-12 Australia
- England 29-19 Samoa
- Australia 36-5 Singapore

=== Pool B ===
Team	Pts	Pld	W	D	L	T	BP
1. Fiji (FIJ)	15	3	3	0	0	17	3
2. South Africa (SAF)	10	3	2	0	1	14	2
3. Scotland (SCO)	4	3	1	0	2	6	0
4. Cook Islands (CKI)	1	3	0	0	3	5	1

- South Africa 24-17 Cook Islands
- Fiji 22-14 Scotland
- South Africa 43-7 Scotland
- Fiji 41-0 Cook Islands
- Scotland 15-10 Cook Islands
- South Africa 15-38 Fiji

== Classification Round ==
=== Cup Round ===
Quarterfinals
QF1
Australia	10
Scotland	7
QF2
Fiji	77
Singapore	0
QF3
South Africa	7
Samoa	31
QF4
England	35
Cook Islands	5

Semifinals
SF1
Australia	24
Fiji	19
SF2
Samoa	15
England	19

Final
Gold Medal Match
Australia	26
England	23
3rd place final
Bronze Medal Match
Samoa	27
Fiji	35

=== Plate round ===
Semi-finals
SF1
South Africa	38
Canada	7
SF2
Scotland	52
Singapore	0

Final
Classification Final
Scotland	5
South Africa	12
Minor Final
Minor Places Final
Singapore	10
Cook Islands	35

== Final Rankings ==
Rank	Team
1st place, gold medalist(s)	Australia
2nd place, silver medalist(s)	England
3rd place, bronze medalist(s)	Fiji
4	Samoa
5	South Africa
6	Scotland
7	Cook Islands
8	Singapore
