= 1977 Cook Islands Round Cup =

Cook Islands Round Cup
- Season: 1977
- Champions: Titikaveka (8)

The 1977 season of the Cook Islands Round Cup was the eighth recorded season of top flight association football competition in the Cook Islands Titikaveka won the championship, their eighth recorded championship in a row.
