= Paul van Eijk =

Cook Islands footballer

Personal information
- Full name: Paul Luiz van Eijk
- Date of birth: 16 March 1986 (age 40)
- Place of birth: Cook Islands
- Height: 1.70 m (5 ft 7 in)
- Position: Defender

Team information
- Current team: Nikao Sokattack

Youth career
- 2003–2004: Auckland Grammar School

Senior career*
Years	Team	Apps	(Gls)
- Nikao Sokattack
- Puaikura

International career^{‡}
2003–2007	Cook Islands	6	(0)
- * Club domestic league appearances and goals as of 29 July 2013 ‡ National team caps and goals as of 29 July 2013

Paul Luiz van Eijk (born 16 March 1986, in Cook Islands) is an athlete of Dutch ancestry who plays as a defender. He currently plays for Nikao Sokattack in association football and Enuamanu Club in handball. He is currently married to Shannon Van Eijk and has three children.

== International career ==
Van Eijk made his debut for Cook Islands at the FIFA World Cup qualification 2003. He made his debut in the match against New Caledonia on 17 May 2004.
