= 2017 Cook Islands Round Cup =

Cook Islands Round Cup
- Season: 2017
- Champions: Tupapa Maraerenga
- Promoted: None
- Relegated: None
- Matches: 42
- Goals: 192 (4.57 per match)
- Biggest home win: Tupapa Maraerenga 7–0 Takuvaine
- Biggest away win: Titikaveka 0–7 Tupapa Maraerenga
- Highest scoring: Puaikura 8–3 Titikaveka

The 2017 Cook Islands Round Cup was the forty-fourth recorded season of top flight association football competition in the Cook Islands, with any results between 1951 and 1969 and also in 1986 and 1988–1990 currently unknown. The competition kicked off on 25 August 2017. Tupapa Maraerenga added to their championships as they had won the 2017 cup. The champions of the league qualified for the 2018 OFC Champions League

== League table ==
Pos	Team	Pld	W	D	L	GF	GA	GD	Pts	Qualification
1	Tupapa Maraerenga	12	10	1	1	54	14	+40	31	Qualification to the 2018 OFC Champions League
2	Nikao Sokattak	12	6	4	2	29	19	+10	22	
3	Puaikura	12	6	3	3	30	21	+9	21	
4	Takuvaine	12	6	2	4	21	21	0	20	
5	Matavera	12	2	4	6	19	23	−4	10	
6	Titikaveka	12	2	2	8	25	54	−29	8	
7	Avatiu	12	1	2	9	14	39	−25	5	

Updated to match(es) played on 8 November 2017. Source:
Rules for classification: 1) points; 2) goal difference; 3) number of goals scored.

== Results ==
Home \ Away	AVA	MAT	NIK	PUA	TAK	TIT	TUP
Avatiu		3–6	2–2	1–3	0–3	2–6	1–6
Matavera	0–0		0–3	1–1	1–2	5–1	2–2
Nikao Sokattak	3–0	2–2		1–1	1–1	7–0	0–6
Puaikura	3–1	3–1	0–2		2–0	8–3	0–1
Takuvaine	1–0	1–0	1–2	3–2		6–3	1–3
Titikaveka	0–3	2–1	3–4	3–3	2–2		0–7
Tupapa Maraerenga	6–1	3–0	3–2	4–5	7–0	6–2	

Legend: Blue = home team win; Yellow = draw; Red = away team win.
