= 1972 Cook Islands Round Cup =

Cook Islands Round Cup
- Season: 1972
- Champions: Titikaveka (3)

The 1972 season of the Cook Islands Round Cup was the third recorded season of top flight association football competition in the Cook Islands, with any results between 1951 and 1969 currently unknown. Titikaveka won the championship, their third recorded championship in a row.
