= Lee Harmon =

Lee Harmon (born 20 October 1967) is a football executive from the Cook Islands. Since 1997, Lee Harmon has been the president of the Cook Islands Football Association (CIFA). Furthermore, he has been a member of the FIFA Council since September 2016. On 7 March 2019, Lee Harmon was suspended by FIFA's ethics committee for the resale of the 2018 FIFA World Cup tickets. Harmon received a fine of £15,000 with the three-month suspension from taking part in football activities at either national or international level. In August 2021, he was banned by the OFC disciplinary committee for six years because of breaching the code of ethics.

== See also ==
- Grover Harmon
- Lee Harmon Jr.
