= 2008 Cook Islands Round Cup =

Cook Islands Round Cup
- Season: 2008
- Champions: Nikao Sokattack

The 2008 season of the Cook Islands Round Cup was the thirty fifth recorded season of top flight association football competition in the Cook Islands, with any results between 1951 and 1969 and also in 1986 and 1988–1990 currently unknown. Nikao Sokattack won the championship, their fifth recorded championship.
