= Paavo Mustonen =

Cook Islands footballer

Personal information
- Full name: Paavo Tariu Mustonen
- Date of birth: 10 November 1989 (age 37)
- Place of birth: Maryborough, Australia
- Height: 1.79 m (5 ft 10 in)
- Position: Forward

Team information
- Current team: Tupapa Maraerenga

Senior career*
Years	Team	Apps	(Gls)
2004–2011	Tupapa Maraerenga		
2005	Emu Plains		
2012	Nikao Sokattak	12	(22)
2013	Puaikura	12	(36)
2014–	Tupapa Maraerenga		

International career^{‡}
2007–	Cook Islands	17	(0)

Managerial career
- 2025–: Cook Islands U16 (assistant)
- 2025–: Cook Islands U15
- 2026: Tupapa Maraerenga
- * Club domestic league appearances and goals ‡ National team caps and goals as of 16 May 2024

Paavo Mustonen (born 10 November 1989) is a Cook Islands international footballer and player-coach for Tupapa Maraerenga. Mustonen was born in Maryborough, Australia, to a Cook Islands mother and a Finnish father. He is of Atiuan descent.

== Career ==
Mustonen began playing senior football at just 15 years of age and established himself as a prolific attacking player. Mustonen has spent 20 years of his club career with Tupapa Maraerenga, interrupted by spells with Nikao Sokattak and Puaikura. He won 15 league titles. His most prolific domestic season came in 2013 with Puaikura, where he scored 36 goals in 12 league matches, and also recording 1 goal in the Cook Islands Cup. He has also represented Tupapa in the OFC Champions League.

In addition to his 11-a-side career, Mustonen has competed in futsal and beach soccer, both domestically and internationally. At international level, Mustonen has represented the Cook Islands since 2007. He also has represented Atiu in the Cook Islands Games. Later in his career, Mustonen has transitioned into coaching, serving as assistant coach of the Cook Islands under-16 national team and head coach of the Cook Islands under-15 national team and Tupapa Maraerenga.

== Career statistics ==
=== Club ===
As of 14 December 2025

Appearances and goals by club, season and competition
Club	Season	League			Cup		Shield		Continental		Other		Total	
Club	Season	Division	Apps	Goals	Apps	Goals	Apps	Goals	Apps	Goals	Apps	Goals	Apps	Goals
Tupapa Maraerenga	2004	Round Cup	1	3	—	—	—	—	—	—	—	—	1	3
Tupapa Maraerenga	2005	Round Cup	—	—	—	—	—	—	—	—	—	—	—	—
Tupapa Maraerenga	2006	Round Cup	—	—	—	—	—	—	—	—	—	—	—	—
Tupapa Maraerenga	2007	Round Cup	—	—	—	—	—	—	—	—	—	—	—	—
Tupapa Maraerenga	2008	Round Cup	—	—	—	—	—	—	—	—	—	—	—	—
Tupapa Maraerenga	2009	Round Cup	—	—	—	—	—	—	—	—	—	—	—	—
Tupapa Maraerenga	2010	Round Cup	—	—	—	—	—	—	—	—	—	—	—	—
Tupapa Maraerenga	2011	Round Cup	1	1	—	—	—	—	—	—	—	—	1	1
Tupapa Maraerenga	2014	Round Cup	12	30	—	—	—	—	—	—	—	—	12	30
Tupapa Maraerenga	2015	Round Cup	—	—	—	—	—	—	—	—	—	—	—	—
Tupapa Maraerenga	2016	Round Cup	—	—	—	—	—	—	3 (Note: Appearances in OFC Men's Champions League)	0	—	—	3	0
Tupapa Maraerenga	2017	Round Cup	—	—	—	—	—	—	—	—	—	—	—	—
Tupapa Maraerenga	2018	Round Cup	—	—	—	—	—	—	—	—	—	—	—	—
Tupapa Maraerenga	2019	Round Cup	—	—	—	—	—	—	—	—	—	—	—	—
Tupapa Maraerenga	2020	Round Cup	15	15	—	—	—	—	—	—	—	—	15	15
Tupapa Maraerenga	2021	Round Cup	—	—	—	—	—	—	—	—	—	—	—	—
Tupapa Maraerenga	2022	Round Cup	—	—	—	—	—	—	—	—	—	—	—	—
Tupapa Maraerenga	2023	Round Cup	—	—	—	—	—	—	—	—	—	—	—	—
Tupapa Maraerenga	2024	Round Cup	—	—	—	—	—	—	3 (Note: Appearances in OFC Men's Champions League)	0	—	—	3	0
Tupapa Maraerenga	2025	Round Cup	—	—	—	—	—	—	1 (Note: Appearances in OFC Men's Champions League)	0	—	—	1	0
Tupapa Maraerenga	2026	Round Cup	3	1	0	0	—	—	—	—	—	—		
Total			27	52	0	0	0	0	7	0	0	0	34	52
Nikao Sokattak	2012	Round Cup	12	22	1	4	—	—	—	—	—	—	13	26
Puaikura	2013	Round Cup	12	36	-	-	—	—	—	—	—	—	12	36
Career total			54	111	3	15	1	4	7	0	0	0	57	114

=== International ===
Cook Islands
Year	Apps	Goals
2007	4	0
2008	0	0
2009	1	0
2010	0	0
2011	3	0
2012	0	0
2013	0	0
2014	0	0
2015	2	0
2023	3	0
2024	3	0
Total	17	0

Statistics accurate as of matches played 14 December 2025

== Honours ==
Nikao Sokattak

- Cook Islands Round Cup: 2006, 2008, 2009
- Cook Islands Cup: 2007, 2008

Tupapa Maraerenga

- Cook Islands Round Cup: 2010, 2011, 2012, 2014
- Cook Islands Cup: 2013
