= 1983 Cook Islands Round Cup =

Cook Islands Round Cup
- Season: 1983
- Champions: Titikaveka (13)

The 1983 season of the Cook Islands Round Cup was the fourteenth recorded season of top flight association football competition in the Cook Islands, with any results between 1951 and 1969 currently unknown. Titikaveka won the championship, their thirteenth recorded championship, and third in a row following a run of nine consecutive titles in the 1970s.
