= Tuka Tisam =

Cook Islander footballer

Personal information
- Full name: Tuka Tisam
- Date of birth: 8 July 1986 (age 40)
- Place of birth: Cook Islands
- Position: Midfielder

Team information
- Current team: Puaikura

Senior career*
Years	Team	Apps	(Gls)
2004	Mount Albert Grammar School		
2004–2007	Nikao		
2007–2008	San Francisco Bay Seals		
2010	Nikao		
- Puaikura

International career
2004–2011	Cook Islands	10	(0)

Managerial career
- 2011–2014: Cook Islands U17
- 2013–2015: Cook Islands (assistant)
- 2015–2016: Cook Islands U20
- 2015: Cook Islands (women)
- 2014–2016: Puaikura FC
- 2018–2023: Suva F.C.
- 2023: Cook Islands (women)
- 2024–2026: Cook Islands
- * Club domestic league appearances and goals

Tuka Tisam (born 8 July 1986) is a Cook Islands international footballer who plays as a midfielder. He was also the head coach of the Cook Islands national football team.

== Career statistics ==
=== International ===
Cook Islands
Year	Apps	Goals
2004	4	0
2009	1	0
2011	5	0
Total	10	0

Statistics accurate as of match played 26 November 2011
