= 1995 Cook Islands Round Cup =

Cook Islands Round Cup
- Season: 1995
- Champions: PTC Coconuts (1)

The 1995 season of the Cook Islands Round Cup was the twenty second recorded season of top flight association football competition in the Cook Islands, with any results between 1951 and 1969 and also in 1986 and 1988–1990 currently unknown. PTC Coconuts won the championship, their first, and to date, only title.
