= Lee Harmon Jr. =

Cook Islands footballer (born 2001)

Personal information
- Full name: Lee Harmon Junior
- Date of birth: 23 October 2001 (age 25)
- Position: Midfielder

Senior career*
| Years | Team | Apps | (Gls) |
| 2017–2020 | Tupapa Maraerenga | | |
| 2020 | Ellerslie | | |
| 2023–2025 | Tupapa Maraerenga | | |

International career^{‡}
| 2022– | Cook Islands | 7 | (0) |
- * Club domestic league appearances and goals ‡ National team caps and goals as of 2 January 2026

Lee Harmon Junior (born 23 October 2001) is an international footballer from the Cook Islands. He plays as a midfielder and holds the world record for the most goals in an international club match.

== Club career ==
In 2020 he joined Ellerslie reserve squad. On 20 February 2024, Harmon equalled a record for most goals in an international club match, scoring 7 in a 2024 OFC Men's Champions League qualifying stage routing of Vaiala Tonga SC, which also made him the top scorer of the tournament.

== Personal life ==
Harmon is son of Lee Harmon and brother of Grover Harmon.

== Career statistics ==
=== International ===
Cook Islands
| Year | Apps | Goals |
|---|---|---|
| 2022 | 1 | 0 |
| 2023 | 4 | 0 |
| 2024 | 2 | 0 |
| Total | 7 | 0 |

Statistics accurate as of match played 2 January 2026
