= 1997 Cook Islands Round Cup =

Cook Islands Round Cup
- Season: 1997
- Champions: Avatiu (5)

The 1997 season of the Cook Islands Round Cup was the twenty fourth recorded season of top flight association football competition in the Cook Islands, with any results between 1951 and 1969 and also in 1986 and 1988–1990 currently unknown. Avatiu won the championship, their fourth recorded championship, and second in a row, although some sources indicate that they also won the 1993 season.
