= PTC Coconuts =

Paradise Trades and Services Coconuts
- League: Cook Islands Round Cup
- 1995: 1st
Home colours	Away colours

Paradise Trades and Services Coconuts, also known as PTC Coconuts or PTS Coconuts was a Cook Islands football club located in Rarotonga. It played in Cook Islands Round Cup in 1995, which they won.

== Titles ==
- Cook Islands Round Cup: 1

1995
