= Tupapa Maraerenga F.C. =

Tupapa Maraerenga
- Full name: Tupapa Maraerenga Football Club
- Nicknames: The Black and Whites
- Short name: TMFC
- Founded: 1968
- Ground: Victoria Park, Avarua
- Capacity: 100
- President: Grover Harmon
- Head coach: Vacant
- League: Cook Islands Round Cup
- 2025: Champions
Home colours	Away colours

Tupapa Maraerenga Football Club, also referred to as Tupapa FC, is a football club located in Avarua, Rarotonga, Cook Islands, representing the 'oire (village) of Tupapa Maraerenga, in the larger vaka (district) of Te Au o Tonga. They currently compete as one of the 6 members of the Rarotonga Club Competition (the Round Cup and the Knockout Cup). They are the most successful club in the Cook Islands, winning 20 round and 11 knockout cups.

Although being more successful in the preliminary rounds, Tupapa has only recorded one win in the OFC Men's Champions League proper, 2–1 over PanSa East. Owenne Matapo holds the world record for the youngest goalscorer in competitive football history, scoring at age 13. Former players Lee Harmon Jr. and Kima Webb hold world records in the OFC Men's Champions League, with Harmon Jr. scoring 7 against Vaiala Tonga, the most in a single continental club match, and Webb participating in the 2025 OFC Men's Champions League qualifying stage as the youngest player.

== History ==
=== Origins ===
Tupapa Maraerenga is one of Rarotonga's traditional 'oire teams that competes in local sporting codes. Tupapa Maraerenga would be officially founded as a football club in 1968.

==== Early years competing ====
Tupapa competed in the early football competition in Rarotonga whilst the Cook Islands Football Association was not a member of FIFA. The club won the 1978 knockout title, and secured their first league title in 1992, the first season officially sanctioned by the Cook Islands Football Association. Tupapa won their first title under FIFA sanctioned league in 1997, quickly followed by 1998 and 1999 titles, thus winning three titles in a row before the new millennium.

=== The new millennium ===
The 2000s saw Tupapa and Nikao Sokattack compete for the title, with 4 championships for the former, and 6 for the latter. Tupapa won 3 in a row (2001, 2002 and 2003), before Nikao repeating the feat, only to be interrupted by the black and whites in 2007.

=== First continental adventure ===
Tupapa became the first Cook Islands club to play on the continental scene, by participating in the 2001 OFC Club Championship. Drawn in group B, they finished 4th out of 5 teams, with 3 losses and 1 win. Their maiden win, which came against PanSa, was initially a 4–0 result, before being turned into a 2–0 win due to the team from American Samoa fielding ineligible players. The club was scheduled to participate in the 2008–09 OFC Champions League preliminary round. However, they withdrew before the competition began.

After winning the 2011 Cook Islands Round Cup, the team appeared in the 2012–13 OFC Champions League, starting in the preliminary Round. After topping their group, they were eliminated in the play-off round by Mont-Dore.

=== League dominance and return to the continental scene ===
The 2010s saw Tupapa cement itself as the new dominant force in the Round Cup, with the club winning 8 out of 10 championships. In 2017, the club took back the Round Cup from the hands of Puaikura, finishing 9 points ahead of runner-up Nikao Sokattak, thus returning to the Champions League. Tupapa managed to overcome the preliminary rounds for the first time in 2018, winning all 3 games and topping their group. They were drawn in the group A, where they lost all games and were eliminated.

In the 2019 OFC Champions League, they repeated the same feat by topping the qualifying group, ahead of Samoan opponents. They were drawn in the group D with Auckland City and Magenta, what was arguably the most difficult group of the competition. They lost all games, with a -33 goal difference. After a 3rd consecutive league title, Tupapa returned to the Champions League, qualifying once again for the group stage, with their games scheduled to take place in New Caledonia. However, the club was forced to withdraw due to three of their players failing to confirm immunization to measles. After winning the 2022 Tower Insurance Premiership, they earned a spot in the 2023 OFC Champions League qualifying stage, but failed to progress after losing to Lupe o le Soaga SC.

With another league title in 2024, Tupapa had won 16 out of the last 25 league titles. The league had not seen such a dominant club since Titikaveka's consecutive titles in the 1970s and 1980s.

For the 2025 season, the club hired female coach Mii Piri-Savage. With the 2025 OFC Men's Champions League qualifying stage held at home, Tupapa progressed to the group stage thanks to a 3–3 draw against Royal Puma and a 2–1 win against Vaipuna. On this occasion, Piri-Savage became the second female coach at the OFC Men's Champions League qualifying stage, and the first ever at the group stage. For their group stage return after 6 years, Tupapa was drawn in group B alongside Hekari United, Ifira Black Bird and Central Coast F.C., once again failing to collect a single point, being eliminated with a –19 goal difference.

They won the 2025 Cook Islands Cup emphatically, beating Nikao Sokattak by 5–0.

Tupapa squad prior to the league match against Matavera

For the OFC Men's Champions League qualifying stage, they faced Pago Youth, Nukuhetulu and hosts Vaivase-Tai. They started their campaign with a 3–0 victory over Nukuhetulu, with loanee Daniel Bunch scoring a brace, and domestically based Ngametua Tuakana scoring 1. Against Vaivase-Tai they would settle for a draw, with both finishing on 10-men. On the final day, Tupapa beat Pago Youth by a convincing 3–0 score, with Bunch scoring twice and president-captain Grover Harmon once. Prior to the 2026 OFC Men's Champions League proper, multiple of their loanees pulled out, including qualifying stars Jordan Boon and Daniel Bunch, leading to them bringing in multiple new players, most notably Honoura Maraetefau, Tauhiki Bohl and Key Villiamu.

For the 2026 OFC Men's Champions League, Tupapa would start their campaign with a 4–1 defeat to Lae City, with Tremaine Rimene-Albrett scoring the club's only goal of the match with a sliced volley into the bottom corner, which was Tupapa's first goal in the tournament proper since 2019. Tupapa would put in a commendable effort against pre-tournament group favourites Rewa, losing 4–2, a match where Rimene-Albrett would add his second to his tournament tally when he scored an equalizer early in the second half, and Honoura Maraetefau would score his first goal for the club to deliver a stoppage-time lifeline. Key Villiamu won player of the match for his defensive efforts. In their final group match against group leaders ABM Galaxy, Tupapa would fall 7–1 to the Ni-Vanuatu, with Medina scoring his third consecutive hattrick. Tremaine Rimene-Albrett would score late to add his 3rd goal to his campaign, finishing as the tournament proper's third top scorer, the second best goalscoring performance by a Cook Islander in the tournament after Maro Bonsu-Maro in 2019.

In September 2026, Tupapa equalled their record win (in recorded history) in a match against Puaikura 14–0, with striker Marcus Gibbens hitting the net 5 times, as well as Temaruata Tearaitoa picking up a hattrick.

In October 2026, long-serving head coach David Milanovic parted ways with the club, joining Puaikura.

== Grounds ==
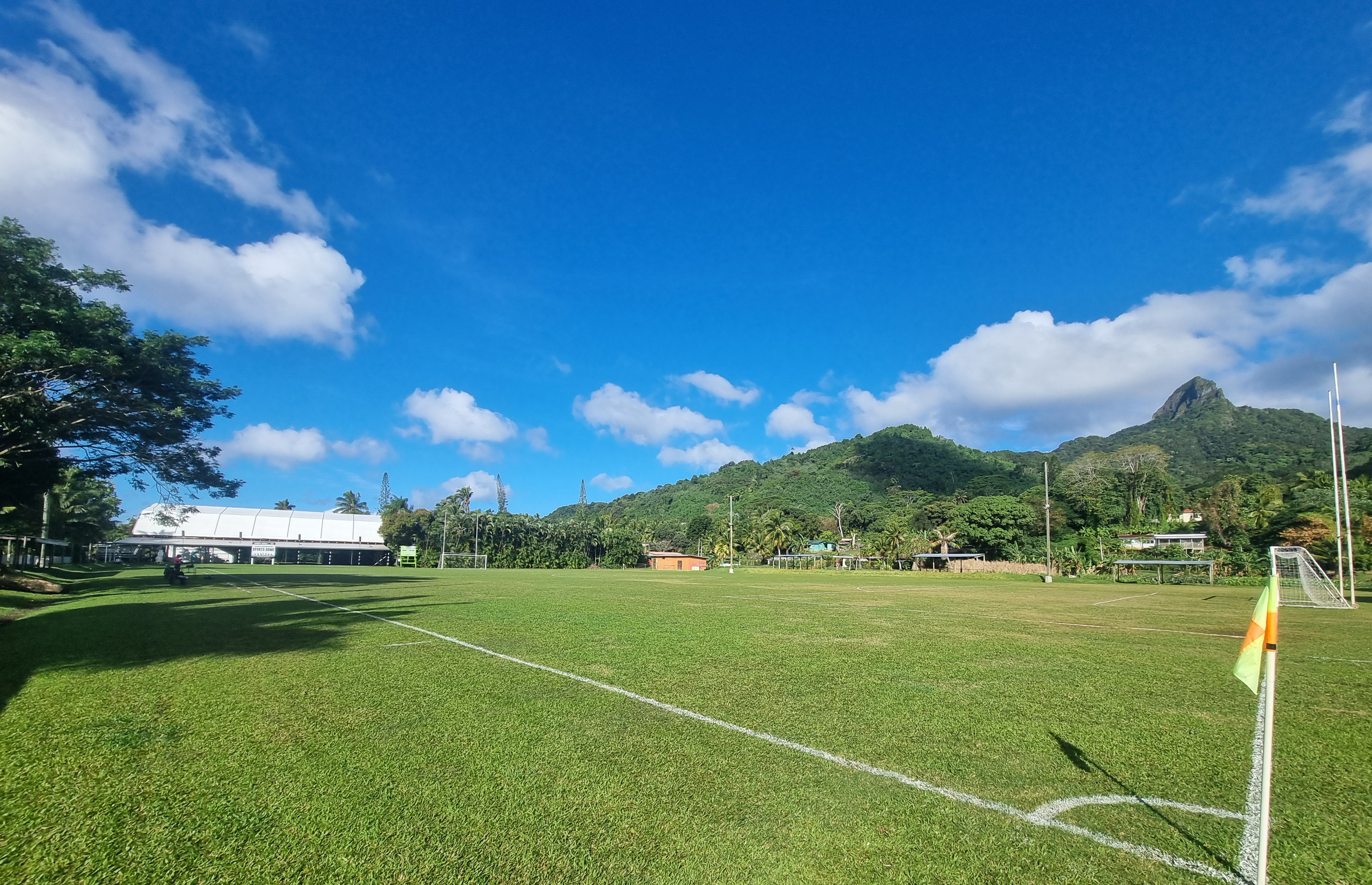
Victoria Park, Avarua

Tupapa Maraerenga plays its home games at Victoria Park in Avarua. The ground has multiple seated accommodation, as well as areas for standing. The Tupapa Maraerenga Sports Association have set out plans to expand it into a stadium, known as the TMSA Sports Facility.

=== Other usage ===
The ground is also used for other sports, specifically rugby union and rugby league, there is also a netball dome.

== Club culture ==
Tupapa has long been regarded as the most prestigious club in the Cook Islands, focusing on structured trainings, tactical play and youth inclusion. They have informal links to clubs and players abroad in New Zealand, who feed their squad for the OFC Men's Champions League campaigns, and diaspora players of Cook Islands descent. Almost all of their domestic squad tends to represent the Cook Islands internationally.

== Rivalries ==
Tupapa holds competitive rivalries against Nikao Sokattak and Puaikura, teams that have consistently challenged the Cook Islands Round Cup. Historically, Tupapa also held rivalries with Titikaveka and Avatiu, competing with Titikaveka in their early dominance, and battling for pride against Avatiu, a match usually referred to as the town rivalry.

One particularly tense match was a 2026 Round Cup meeting away at Nikao Sokattak's Nikao Field on 29 August, leading to a brawl on the field which saw Shane Tuteru of Tupapa sent off. It would finish 0-0, a crucial match which was defining to the title race for both teams.

== Current squad ==
As of August 2026

Squad numbers are as assigned during the 2026 OFC Men's Champions League

Note: Flags indicate national team as defined under FIFA eligibility rules; some limited exceptions apply. Players may hold more than one non-FIFA nationality.

No.	Pos.	Nation	Player
1	GK	COK	Moana Rakei
2	FW	COK	Marcus Gibbens
6	MF	COK	Ngametua Tuakana
8	DF	COK	Jarves Aperau
9	FW	COK	Moses Taokia
11	FW	COK	Temaruata Tearaitoa
12	DF	COK	Shane Tuteru
13	MF	COK	Grover Harmon
16	DF	COK	Sean Angene
19	MF	COK	Owenne Matapo
—	FW	COK	Paavo Mustonen (captain)
—	DF	COK	Avi Enoka
—	FW	COK	Geoffrey Strickland

No.	Pos.	Nation	Player
—	DF	COK	John Noovao
—	FW	COK	Campbell Best
—	DF	COK	Oscar Wichman
—	MF	FIJ	Raryann Narayan
—	MF	COK	Oscar Hutchinson
—	GK	COK	Kimiora Ngamata
—	FW	COK	Luke Newbigging
—	MF	COK	Charles-Trevor Woonton
—	DF	COK	Maru Tereu
—	FW	COK	Teaukura Emmanuela
—	MF	COK	Damarius Nga
—	DF	COK	Zephania Aperau-Toa

== Current technical staff ==
As of October 2026

Position	Name
President	(Cook Islands) Grover Harmon
Vice-president	(Cook Islands) Mii-Piri Joseph
Team manager	(Cook Islands) Danny Vakapora
Assistant manager	(Cook Islands) Roger Manuel
Head coach	Vacant
Assistant coach	(Cook Islands) Grover Harmon

== Notable former players ==
- (Republic of Ireland) Dylan Connolly - Former player of Auckland City
- (England) Jordan Boon - Former player of Bolton Wanderers youth
- (Cook Islands) Emmett Connolly - Former player of Lion City Sailors
- (Cook Islands) Benjamin Mata - Former New Zealand youth international
- Taylor Saghabi - All time top scorer of the Cook Islands national football team
- Tony Jamieson - Most capped player of the Cook Islands national football team
- Joshua Galletly - Former New Zealand youth international
- (Cook Islands) Maro Bonsu-Maro - Former player of Auckland City
- Ben Hunt - Former New Zealand youth international
- Sacha Nathu - Former New Zealand youth international
- Liam Little - Former New Zealand youth international
- (New Zealand) Rhys Ruka - Won the 2026 Chatham Cup with Fencibles United AFC
- (New Zealand) Frank Clarke - Won the 2026 Chatham Cup with Fencibles United
- (New Zealand) Ryan Clarke - Won the 2026 Chatham Cup with Fencibles United

== Honours ==
- Cook Islands Round Cup: 20

1992, 1997, 1998–99, 2001, 2002, 2003, 2007, 2010, 2011, 2012, 2014, 2015, 2017, 2018, 2019, 2020, 2022, 2023, 2024, 2025

- Cook Islands Cup: 10

2001, 2004, 2009, 2013, 2015, 2018, 2019, 2023, 2024, 2025 (1978)

== Women's team ==
Tupapa Maraerenga has a team in the Women's Cook Islands Round Cup. It has been crowned champions 15 times, in addition to winning 15 FA Cups. After winning the 2024 Round Cup, they participated in the 2025 OFC Women's Champions League for the first time.
