= 1950 Cook Islands Round Cup =

Cook Islands Round Cup
- Season: 1950
- Champions: Titikaveka (1)

The 1950 season of the Cook Islands Round Cup was the first season of top flight association football competition in the Cook Islands. Titikaveka won the championship.
