= 1980 Cook Islands Round Cup =

Cook Islands Round Cup
- Season: 1980
- Champions: Avatiu (1)

The 1980 season of the Cook Islands Round Cup was the eleventh recorded season of top flight association football competition in the Cook Islands, with any results between 1951 and 1969 currently unknown. Avatiu won the championship, their first recorded championship, and the first time any team other than Titikaveka is recorded as having won the championship.
