= Cook Islands Cup =

- Founded: 1950

Cook Islands Cup is the top knockout tournament of the Cook Islands Football Association in Cook Islands.

== Cook Islands Cup winners ==
- 1950: Titikaveka
- 1951–77: Unknown
- 1978: Tupapa Maraerenga
- 1979: Titikaveka
- 1980: Matavera
- 1981: Avatiu
- 1982: Avatiu
- 1983: Nikao Sokattack
- 1984: Titikaveka
- 1985: Arorangi
- 1986–90: Unknown
- 1991: Takuvaine
- 1992: Avatiu
- 1993: Avatiu
- 1994: Avatiu
- 1995: Avatiu
- 1996: Avatiu
- 1997: Avatiu
- 1998: Avatiu
- 1999: Avatiu
- 2000: Avatiu
- 2001: Tupapa Maraerenga
- 2002: Nikao Sokattack
- 2003: Nikao Sokattack
- 2004: Tupapa Maraerenga
- 2005: Nikao Sokattack
- 2006: Takuvaine
- 2007: Nikao Sokattack
- 2008: Nikao Sokattack
- 2009: Tupapa Maraerenga
- 2010: Nikao Sokattack
- 2011: Nikao Sokattack
- 2012: Nikao Sokattack
- 2013: Tupapa Maraerenga
- 2014: Takuvaine
- 2015: Tupapa Maraerenga
- 2016: Puaikura
- 2017: Puaikura
- 2018: Tupapa Maraerenga
- 2019: Tupapa Maraerenga
- 2020: Nikao Sokattack
- 2021: Nikao Sokattack
- 2022: Nikao Sokattack
- 2023: Tupapa Maraerenga
- 2024: Tupapa Maraerenga
- 2025: Tupapa Maraerenga

=== Titles ===
Club	Winners
Nikao Sokattack	12
Avatiu	11
Tupapa Maraerenga	10
Puaikura (includes Arorangi)	3
Takuvaine	3
Titikaveka	2
Matavera	1

== See also ==
- Cook Islands Round Cup
