= 1992 Cook Islands Round Cup =

Cook Islands Round Cup
- Season: 1992
- Champions: Tupapa Maraerenga (1)

The 1992 season of the Cook Islands Round Cup was the nineteenth recorded season of top flight association football competition in the Cook Islands, with any results between 1951 and 1969 and also in 1986 and 1988–1990 currently unknown. Tupapa Maraerenga won the championship, their first recorded championship, although other sources suggest that the league was won by Takuvaine, which would also have been their first title.
