= Cook Islands Football Association =

Highest governing body in Cook Islands football

OFC
- Short name: CIFA
- Founded: 1991
- Headquarters: Matavera, Rarotonga
- FIFA affiliation: 1994
- OFC affiliation: 1994
- President: Grover Harmon
- Website: https://www.cookislandsfootball.com/

The Cook Islands Football Association is the governing body of football in the Cook Islands.

== History ==
The association was founded in 1991.

In 1994, CIFA became a member of FIFA.

== Stadium and headquarters ==
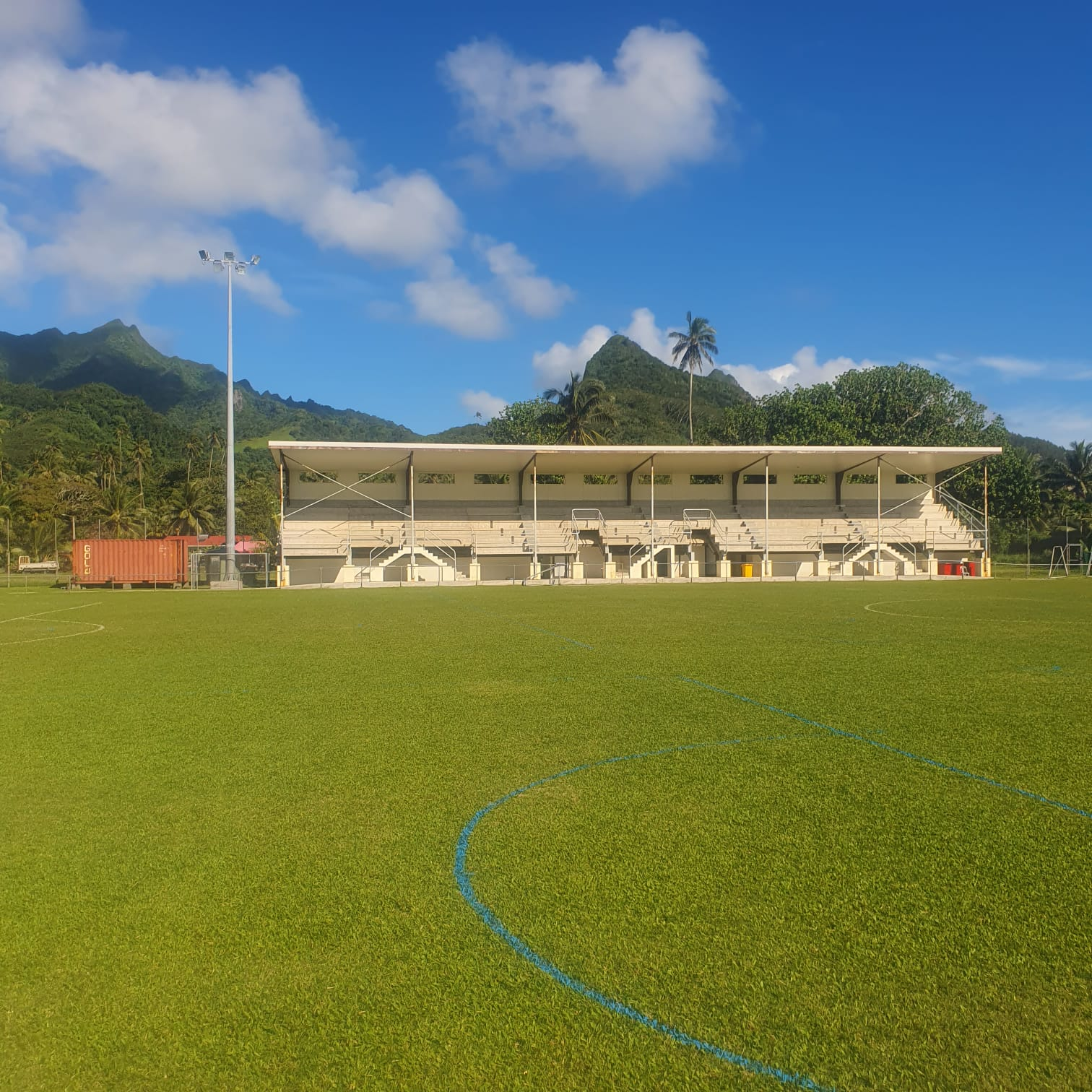
The CIFA Academy

In 2003, FIFA's Goal Programme funded the building of the "House of Football" CIFA Academy in Matavera, which would double as the association's headquarters and football pitch, which would officially open in April 2004. In June 2006, the stadium would be expanded to include a 500-seater grandstand with covered seating and dressing rooms. In 2010, further developments were made, including a new administration and gym building. In 2017, a major upgrade to the main pitch would be made with a reported budget of $500,000.

== Competitions ==
=== Men ===
- Round Cup
- Knockout Cup
- Cook Islands Games
- Town vs Country Series
- Friday Night Futsal
- Te Ara Futsal

=== Women ===
- Women's Round Cup
- Women's Knockout Cup
- Women's Cook Islands Games
- Women's Town vs Country Series
- Women's Friday Night Futsal
- Women's Te Ara Futsal

=== Youth ===
- U18 Boys Round Cup
- U18 Girls Round Cup
- U15 Boys Round Cup
- U15 Girls Round Cup
- U18 Boys Knockout Cup
- U18 Girls Knockout Cup
- U15 Boys Knockout Cup
- U15 Girls Knockout Cup
- U15 Girls Friday Night Futsal
- U12 Mixed Friday Night Futsal
- U15 Boys Te Ara Futsal
- U15 Girls Te Ara Futsal
- U12 Boys Te Ara Futsal
- U12 Girls Te Ara Futsal
- U18 Boys Kia Orana Football Festival
- U18 Girls Kia Orana Football Festival
- U15 Boys Kia Orana Football Festival
- U15 Girls Kia Orana Football Festival

=== Defunct ===
- Second Division
- Air New Zealand Soccer Competition
- CIFA Charity Shield

== Membership ==
=== Full members ===
- Avatiu F.C.
- Matavera F.C.
- Nikao Sokattak F.C.
- Puaikura F.C.
- Titikaveka F.C.
- Tupapa Maraerenga F.C.
- Aitutaki Football Association
- Atiu Football Association
- Mangaia Football Association
- Mauke Football Association
- Mitiaro Football Association
- Pukapuka Football Association
- Rakahanga Football Association

=== Associate members ===
- Manihiki Football Association
- Nassau Football Association
- Tongareva (Penrhyn) Football Association

=== Former members ===
- Takuvaine F.C.
- Air Raro F.C.
- PTC Coconuts

=== Former invitational members ===
- Ellerslie AFC
- Beachlands Maraetai AFC

== Staff ==
Name	Position	Source
(Cook Islands) Grover Harmon	President	
(Cook Islands) Junior Enoka, (Cook Islands) Moeroa Tamangaro	Vice president	
(Cook Islands) Mii Joseph	General Secretary	
(Cook Islands) Teina Savage	Treasurer	
(New Zealand) Matt Campbell	Technical director	
(New Zealand) Rhys Ruka	Head coach (men's)	
(New Zealand) Rhys Ruka	Head coach (women's)	
(Cook Islands) George Ellis	Media/communications manager	
(Cook Islands) Susan Williams	Grassroots development oficer	
(Fiji) Rakesh Varman	Referee coordinator	

== See also ==
- Football in Cook Islands
