= Cook Islands Round Cup =

- Organising body: Cook Islands Football Association
- Founded: 1992 (1950)
- Country: Cook Islands
- Regions: Rarotonga
- Confederation: OFC
- Number of clubs: 6
- Level on pyramid: 1
- International cup: OFC Champions League
- Current champions: Nikao Sokattak (8 titles) (2026)
- Most premierships: Tupapa Maraerenga (20 titles)
- Broadcaster: Vaka Television
- Current: 2026

The Cook Islands Round Cup, also known as the Rarotonga Round Cup and the Mustonen Construction Premiership, is the top division amateur football league of the Cook Islands Football Association and regular season tournament for the Cook Islands Knockout Cup. The winner qualifies for the OFC Champions League qualifying stage.

It was ranked the 453rd strongest league in the world by Opta Sports in November 2026, the 2nd weakest league worldwide only ahead of the Bhutan Super League.

== History ==
League football has been competed in the Cook Islands since 1950, before the Rarotonga Club Competition was formed in 1992.

== Competing clubs (2025) ==
- Avatiu
- Matavera
- Nikao Sokattak
- Puaikura
- Titikaveka
- Tupapa Maraerenga

== Competition format ==
=== Competition ===
There are 6 clubs in the CIFA Rarotonga Round Cup. During the course of a season (normally July to December) each clubs play each other 3 times (triple round-robin format), once at home, once at that of their opponents and once at the neutral CIFA Academy, for 15 games. Teams receive three points for a win and one point for a draw. No points are awarded for a loss. Teams are ranked by total points, then goal difference, and then goals scored. If still equal, teams are sorted by head-to-head record between the tied teams. If the teams are tied still, they will be sorted by fair play, with the team with the least yellow cards and red cards being placed above. If still drawn, the Cook Islands Football Association will draw lots to determine final positions.

=== Substitutions ===
A maximum of 5 substitutions can be used during a match, this can be out of any amount, so considering that the maximum squad size is 22, the maximum amount of players on the bench is 11.

=== Player registration and transfers ===
For a club to transfer in a player, they must have had the CIFA Competitions Committee approve of the transfer, confirming that both the player and club have agreed on the transfer, where the club signing the player will then pay a fee of either $30 (for a player under 18) or $150 (for a player over the age of 19). If there is a dispute between the two clubs relating to the transfer, the matter is referred to the CIFA Disputes and Disciplinary Committee for a decision. If the transfer is in order, the CIFA Secretariat shall advise the player and the two clubs concerned that the transfer is approved.

Teams can register a maximum of 22 players, and a maximum of 4 foreign players (players based abroad who do not have Cook Islands descent).

If a team is found guilty of fielding an ineligible player, the opposition will be handed a 3-0 walkover victory.

==== League transfer/registration windows ====
25th June – 29th August 2025 & 29th September – 31st October 2025

==== OFC Champions League transfer/registration window ====
18th June 2025 – 31st March 2026 (applies for both men's and women's competitions)

== Unofficial winners ==
- 1950: Titikaveka
- 1951–70: Unknown
- 1971: Titikaveka
- 1972: Titikaveka
- 1973: Titikaveka
- 1974: Titikaveka
- 1975: Titikaveka
- 1976: Titikaveka
- 1977: Titikaveka
- 1978: Titikaveka
- 1979: Titikaveka
- 1980: Avatiu
- 1981: Titikaveka
- 1982: Titikaveka
- 1983: Titikaveka
- 1984: Titikaveka
- 1985: Arorangi / Puaikura
- 1986: Unknown
- 1987: Arorangi / Puaikura
- 1988–90: Unknown
- 1991: Avatiu

== Official winners ==
- 1992: Tupapa Maraerenga
- 1993: Avatiu
- 1994: Avatiu
- 1995: PTS Coconuts
- 1996: Avatiu
- 1997: Tupapa Maraerenga
- 1998: Tupapa Maraerenga
- 1999: Tupapa Maraerenga
- 2000: Nikao Sokattack
- 2001: Tupapa Maraerenga
- 2002: Tupapa Maraerenga
- 2003: Tupapa Maraerenga
- 2004: Nikao Sokattack
- 2005: Nikao Sokattack
- 2006: Nikao Sokattack
- 2007: Tupapa Maraerenga
- 2008: Nikao Sokattack
- 2009: Nikao Sokattack
- 2010: Tupapa Maraerenga
- 2011: Tupapa Maraerenga
- 2012: Tupapa Maraerenga
- 2013: Puaikura
- 2014: Tupapa Maraerenga
- 2015: Tupapa Maraerenga
- 2016: Puaikura
- 2017: Tupapa Maraerenga
- 2018: Tupapa Maraerenga
- 2019: Tupapa Maraerenga
- 2020: Tupapa Maraerenga
- 2021: Nikao Sokattack
- 2022: Tupapa Maraerenga
- 2023: Tupapa Maraerenga
- 2024: Tupapa Maraerenga
- 2025: Tupapa Maraerenga
- 2026: Nikao Sokattack

== Titles ==
Club	Winners
Tupapa Maraerenga	20
Nikao	8
Avatiu	3
Puaikura †	2
PTS Coconuts	1

== Second Division winners ==
- 1985: Titikaveka
- 1986: Titikaveka
- 1987–96: Unknown
- 1997: Air Raro
- 1998–99: Titikaveka
- 2000: Takuvaine
- 2001–03: Unknown
- 2004: Takuvaine
- 2005: Takuvaine
- 2006: Takuvaine
