= 1993 Cook Islands Round Cup =

Cook Islands Round Cup
- Season: 1993
- Champions: Tupapa Maraerenga (2)

The 1993 season of the Cook Islands Round Cup was the twentieth recorded season of top flight association football competition in the Cook Islands, with any results between 1951 and 1969 and also in 1986 and 1988–1990 currently unknown. Tupapa Maraerenga won the championship, their second recorded championship and second in a row, although other sources suggest that the league was won by Avatiu, which would also have been their third title.
