= Puaikura F.C. =

Puaikura
- Full name: Puaikura Football Club
- Nickname: The Reds
- Founded: 1969
- Ground: Raemaru Park
- Capacity: 100
- President: Tuaine Fatiaki
- Manager: Naomi Nena
- Coach: Daniel Taokia
- League: Cook Islands Round Cup
- 2025: 6th
Home colours	Away colours

Puaikura Football Club, formerly and colloquially known as Arorangi FC is a Cook Islands football club based in Arorangi, Rarotonga. They are one of the 6 members of the Rarotonga Club Competition (Round Cup and Knockout Cup). They have won two Round Cup titles in 2013 and 2017, and the Knockout Cup in 2016 and 2017.

They are considered one of the weakest football teams in the world because of their lowly stature in recent years competing in the Round Cup, the smallest FIFA-affiliated top-flight by population. This is supported by the Opta Power Rankings, where they are ranked 14,455th out of 14,455, the single weakest football team worldwide.

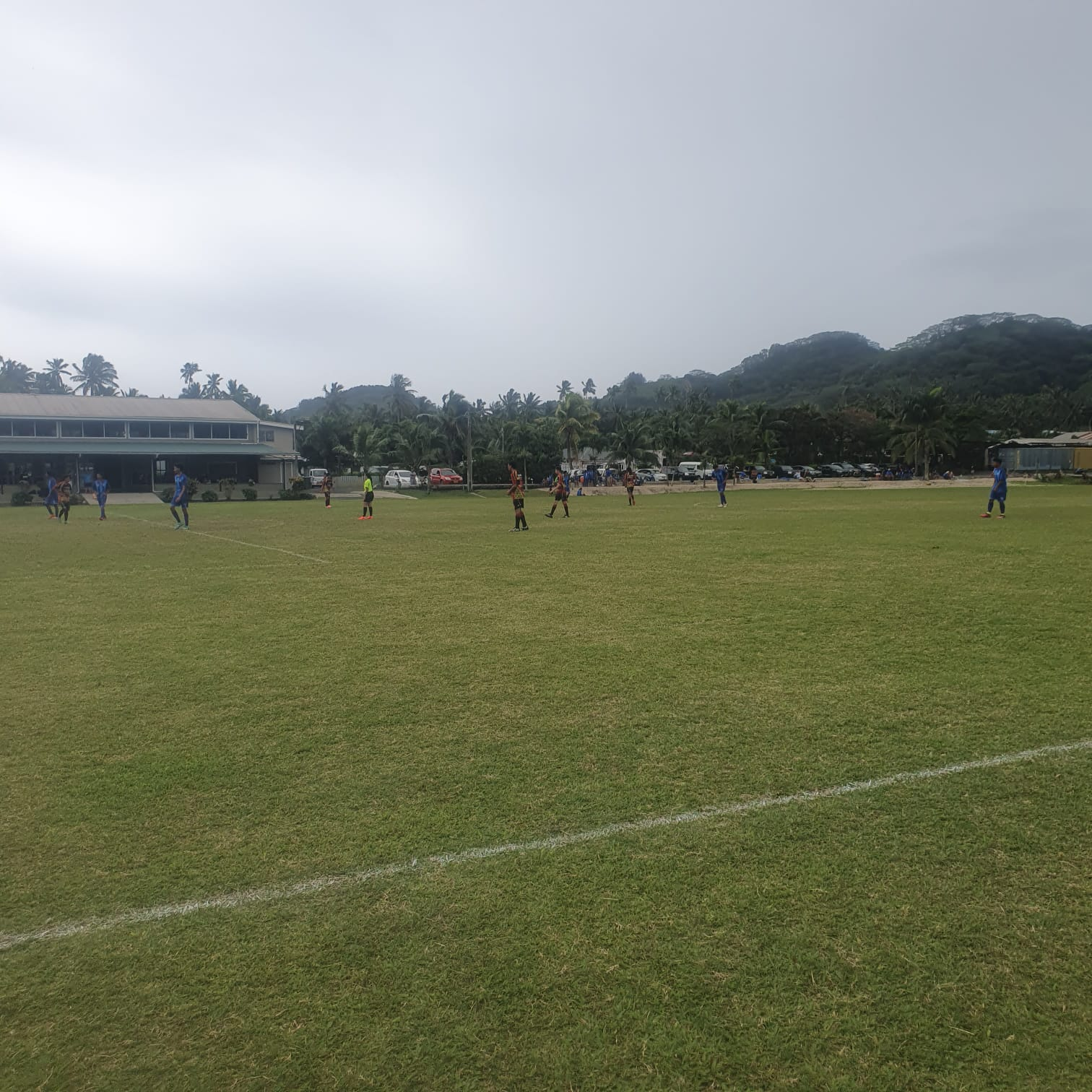
Puaikura's home, Raemaru Park

== History ==
=== Beginnings ===
Arorangi FC were formed in 1969 to compete in the early stages of the Cook Islands Round Cup, however, this can be viewed as invalid as the club competed as a village representative team, instead of an official club registered with the government as a business. As Arorangi, they managed to win 2 Round Cup titles in 1985 and 1987, including a cup title in 1985.

=== Puaikura ===
In 2013, Arorangi FC was renamed Puaikura, which is another name for the Arorangi region in the Cook Islands. The name means red sacred fire and originates from the tribe's separation from Takitumu. In their first year as Puaikura, they went on to lift the Round Cup title undefeated, with Paavo Mustonen finishing as their top-scorer, with 36 league goals in 12 matches, and 1 cup goal as Puaikura fell out of the tournament in the first round. Puaikura notably would demolish Titikaveka by 11–0, with Mustonen scoring 6. That season they also beat Takuvaine F.C. by 14–1 and Matavera F.C. by 13–1.

Puaikura's starting line-up against Titikaveka

=== First continental tournament ===
Puaikura qualified for the 2014–15 OFC Champions League and were placed in a qualifying group alongside SKBC FC, Lotohaʻapai United and Lupe o le Soaga SC.

Puaikura faced SKBC FC in their opening match. Temana Pennycook opened the scoring in first-half stoppage time. In the 78th minute, a crucial goal-line clearance by Paul van Eijk preserved Puaikura’s lead, but in the 90th minute Gun-cheol Kang scored to equalise. On matchday two, Lupe took the lead in the 8th minute through Silao Malo, who scored a volley from outside the box. However, former Rangers player Stuart Kelly equalised with Dwayne Tiputoa scoring a minute later to take the lead, but Lupe fought, and secured a 3-2 win with Silao Malo scoring the equalizer, and the winner coming from the head of Andrew Setefano. In their final match against Lotohaʻapai United, Stuart Kelly scored to win 1-0, securing Puaikura’s first ever continental victory and a second-place finish in the qualifying group.

=== Peak and second continental tournament ===
Puaikura arguably hit their peak between 2016 and early 2017. Coached by Anthony Samuela, they won the 2016 Cook Islands Round Cup title undefeated with an impressive 10 wins and 2 draws in 12 games, as well as winning the Cook Islands Cup with a 6-2 victory over Avatiu, following a replay after bad weather in the first match.

Prior to the 2017 OFC Champions League, Puaikura brought in New Zealand head coach Matt Calcott, who used his connections to bring in notable players from the New Zealand Football Championship, Cook Islanders playing abroad and local players from the successful season before. Puaikura started strong, recording a memorable 4-0 win against Tongan Veitongo, a hard fought 2-1 victory against Samoan champions Lupe o le Soaga, getting their revenge for their first meeting in 2014. They then secured their perfect 3 for 3 win record after defeating Utulei Youth of American Samoa 3-1, qualifying them for the final tournament of the OFC Men's Champions League, the first time a Cook Islands club had competed since the 2001 OFC Club Championship, and the first time a Cook Islands club had qualified through the qualifying round.

Puaikura left the 2017 OFC Champions League finals proud, although not winning a game, as they had created history for just qualifying, and had competed against clubs of the top level of Oceania, even briefly leading against eventual runners up Team Wellington.

=== Decline and struggles ===
After the 2016 season, Puaikura have still yet to win another league title, and have gradually declined towards the bottom end of the table, finishing bottom of the table in the 2025 Cook Islands Round Cup finishing with only 11 points and having a goal differencial of -41, conceding 62 goals. This season they also recorded a monumental 17-0 defeat to Nikao Sokattak, as well as 7-0 and 9-1 defeats to Tupapa Maraerenga.

In 2026, Puaikura suffered immensely; many players decided to leave due to 'mismanagement', including long-serving captain Jarves Aperau to Tupapa Maraerenga, star midfielder William Napa moving to Nikao Sokattak aswell as multiple players moving abroad. This would leave the team desperate for numbers, turning up to their matchday one Round Cup fixture with only 8 men, leading them to suffer an immense 16-0 defeat against Nikao. Puaikura were cleanswept in round 1 and round 2, losing all 10 matches, but in round 3, despite losing all 4 of their first matches, they ended their league campain with a narrow 2-1 victory over Matavera.

They continued their winning form into the Cook Islands Cup, where they secured a hard-fought 3–2 victory over Titikaveka F.C. in the first round, earning a meeting with league champions Nikao.

Puaikura put up a spirited fight, and despite some impressive goalkeeping from Tuiate Tuariki, Nikao took the lead in the 20th minute. A close-range effort from Harold Rasmussen was parried by Tuariki into the path of Alphy Ngire, who made no mistake from the rebound.

Puaikura responded with a moment of fortune. A high ball from Tuka Tisam was met by the Puaikura striker, who initially appeared to misjudge his attempt, slicing at the ball and missing it entirely. The unexpected movement wrong-footed Nikao goalkeeper Tearii Scheel, allowing the striker to recover and head into an unguarded net to make it 1–1.

With momentum on their side, Puaikura pushed forward in numbers. One of their best opportunities came when midfielder JJ Karika attempted an audacious effort from near the halfway line. His looping shot sailed over Scheel but agonisingly cleared the crossbar, landing on the roof of the net.

Puaikura's hopes of causing an upset were eventually dashed by Nikao's attacking quality. Despite Tuariki's brilliant double save against Ngire, Nathan Utakea restored their lead, picking up the rebound at the far post.

Nikao extended their advantage in the second half, with Ngire completing his brace in the 59th minute. Fifteen-year-old goalkeeper Scheel then converted a penalty in the 68th minute, before a well-placed finish into the corner from Utakea gave him his second in the 83rd minute. Hot prospect Taianu Williams rounded off the scoring just two minutes later, curling a powerful effort into the bottom-right corner to seal a 6–1 victory and bring Puaikura's cup campaign to an end.

== Current squad ==
Squad for the 2026 Cook Islands Round Cup

Note: Flags indicate national team as defined under FIFA eligibility rules; some limited exceptions apply. Players may hold more than one non-FIFA nationality.

No.	Pos.	Nation	Player
—	GK	COK	Tuaite Tuariki
—	DF	COK	Paul Van Eijk
—	DF	COK	Tama
—	DF	COK	Rohan Vano
—	DF	CAN	David Milanovic
—	MF	COK	Tuka Tisam
—	MF	COK	Te-Ava Wichman
—	MF	COK	JJ Karika
—	MF	COK	Dwayne Tiputoa
—	MF	TUV	Matairea Paratainga Moeauri
—	FW	COK	Daniel Taokia
—	FW	COK	Ano Tisam

== Team awards ==
	MVP	Most improved	Man of steel
2025	Tamatoa Matutu	JJ Karika	Joseph Tuaputa

== Honours ==
- Cook Islands Round Cup: 2

2013, 2016 (1985, 1987)

- Cook Islands Cup: 2

2016, 2017 (1985)
