= Takuvaine F.C. =

Takuvaine
- League: Cook Islands Round Cup
- 2017: 4th
Home colours	Away colours

Takuvaine FC was a Cook Islands football club located in Rarotonga, Cook Islands. It formerly played in Cook Islands Round Cup, the main football league competition. They have not won a championship but have won two Cook Islands Cups.

== Titles ==
- Cook Islands Cup: 2

1991, 2014
