= Matavera F.C. =

Matavera
- Full name: Matavera-Ngatangiia Football Club
- Nickname: The Maroons
- Founded: 1969
- Ground: Takitumu School
- Chairman: Jake Numanga
- Manager: Mura Herman
- League: Cook Islands Round Cup
- 2025: 3rd
Home colours	Away colours

Matavera FC is a Cook Islands football club located in Matavera. It currently plays in the Cook Islands Round Cup, the main football league competition. They have won one Cook Islands Cup.

== Titles ==
- Cook Islands Cup
  - Winners (1): 1980

== Current squad ==
Squad for the 2025 Cook Islands Round Cup

Note: Flags indicate national team as defined under FIFA eligibility rules; some limited exceptions apply. Players may hold more than one non-FIFA nationality.

No.	Pos.	Nation	Player
—	GK	COK	Daniel Ngamata
—	GK	COK	Kenneth Rota-Ariki
—	DF	COK	Luke Areai
—	DF	COK	Ed Brogan
—	DF	COK	Kenya Enoka
—	DF	SOL	Alfred Ngire-Hendy
—	DF	VAN	Jack Poiri
—	FW	COK	Siaosi Kaufononga
—	MF	SOL	Marc Leito
—	MF	COK	Ronnie Sakai

No.	Pos.	Nation	Player
—	MF	COK	James Jnr
—	FW	COK	George Ellis (captain)
—	MF	COK	George Rouru
—	FW	VAN	Julius David
—	FW	COK	Ccil Neko
—	FW	SOL	Alphy Ngire
—	DF	COK	Paul Poila
—	DF	COK	Marcus Gibbens
—	FW	COK	Mareta Matamaki
