= Avatiu FC =

Avatiu
- Ground: Aretere Park
- Capacity: 500
- President: Terry Piri
- League: Cook Islands Round Cup
- 2025: Round Cup, 3rd of 6
Home colours	Away colours

Avatiu Football Club is a football club based in Avatiu, Rarotonga, Cook Islands. It currently plays in Cook Islands Round Cup the main football league competition. They have won six championships and eleven Cook Islands Cups.

== Current squad ==
Most commonly used squad numbers used as the Round Cup does not have designated squad numbers.

As of October 2026

Note: Flags indicate national team as defined under FIFA eligibility rules; some limited exceptions apply. Players may hold more than one non-FIFA nationality.

No.	Pos.	Nation	Player
—	GK	FIJ	Luke Vidovi
—	DF	COK	Paul Ngaroi
—	DF	COK	Teina Savage
—	DF	COK	Teurukura Tutai
—	DF	COK	Kamoeau Mataroa
—	DF	COK	Tyler Emile
—	DF	SAM	Viiga Reupena
10	MF	COK	Joseph Rua
—	MF	FIJ	Navin Reddy

No.	Pos.	Nation	Player
—	MF	KIR	Tarau Rakoroa
5	MF	FIJ	Aaron Simpson
—	FW	COK	Jojo Hethers
—	FW	FIJ	Samuel Ravuaceva
—	FW	COK	Teura Tapoki
3	FW	COK	Leo Nand
—	FW	COK	James Nand
2	FW	COK	Tione Nand (captain)
9	FW	COK	Andrew Teena

== Honours ==
- Cook Islands Round Cup: 5

1991, 1994, 1996, 1997, 1999 (1980)

- Cook Islands Cup: 9

1992, 1993, 1994, 1995, 1996, 1997, 1998, 1999, 2000 (1981, 1982)
