= Nikao Sokattak F.C. =

Nikao Sokattak
- Nickname: Sokattak
- Short name: NSFC
- Founded: 1998
- Ground: Nikao Field
- Capacity: 150
- Chairman: Macan Munokoa
- Manager: Alex Napa
- League: Cook Islands Round Cup
- 2026: Round Cup, 1st of 6
Home colours	Away colours

Nikao Sokattak F.C. is a Cook Islands football club located in Nikao, Rarotonga. It currently plays in Cook Islands Round Cup, the top level of football in the Cook Islands.

Professional footballer Max Crocombe formerly played for them.

== Current squad ==
As of October 2026

Note: Flags indicate national team as defined under FIFA eligibility rules; some limited exceptions apply. Players may hold more than one non-FIFA nationality.

No.	Pos.	Nation	Player
—	GK	COK	Tearii Scheel
—	DF	COK	Mareva Pierre
—	DF	COK	Taianu Williams
—	DF	COK	Tana Raina
—	DF	COK	Harold Rasmussen
—	DF	COK	Tamaiva Mateariki
—	DF	COK	Aiga Samania
—	DF	COK	Stevie Willis
—	MF	COK	Jayden Angene
—	MF	COK	Nathan Tisam
—	MF	COK	William Napa
—	MF	COK	Xavier Utakea
—	MF	COK	Atu Putere
—	MF	COK	George Temata Rouru
—	FW	COK	Nathan Utakea
—	FW	SOL	Alphy Ngire
—	FW	VAN	Julius David

== Current technical staff ==
As of October 2026

Position	Name
President	(Cook Islands) Macan Munokoa
Team manager	(Cook Islands) Alex Napa
Head coach	(Cook Islands) Alex Napa
Assistant coach	(Cook Islands) Apii Angene
U18 head coach	(Cook Islands) Apii Angene

== Honours ==
- Cook Islands Round Cup:
  - Winners (8): 2000, 2004, 2005, 2006, 2008, 2009, 2021, 2026
  - Runners-up (5): 2010, 2011, 2017, 2018, 2019, 2022, 2023
- Cook Islands Cup:
  - Winners (12): 1983, 2002, 2003, 2005, 2007, 2008, 2010, 2011, 2012, 2020, 2021, 2022
  - Runners-up (8): 1999, 2000, 2004, 2006, 2009, 2015, 2018, 2019
