= Titikaveka F.C. =

Titikaveka
- Nicknames: Bulldogs, The Soldiers in Blue
- Founded: 1968
- Ground: Titikaveka Field
- President: Moeroa Tamangaro
- League: Cook Islands Round Cup
- 2025: Round Cup, 5th of 6
Home colours	Away colours

Titikaveka F.C. is a Cook Islands football club located in Avarua. It currently plays in Cook Islands Round Cup which is the name for its main football league competition, they have won 14 league titles from 1950 to 1984. The last time the club won the Cook Islands FA Cup was in 1984 when they beat Arorangi 6–1. They have achieved the Double three times in 1950, 1975 and 1984

== Honours ==
- Cook Islands Round Cup: 14

1950, 1971, 1972, 1973, 1974, 1975, 1976, 1977, 1978, 1979, 1981, 1982, 1983, 1984

- Cook Islands Cup: 3

1950, 1979, 1984
