= 2020 in Oceania =

The following events happened in Oceania in the year 2020.

== Sovereign states ==
=== Australia ===
The Commonwealth of Australia gained its independence from the United Kingdom in 1901 and is a member of the Commonwealth of Nations.

- Chief of state: Queen Elizabeth II (since February 6, 1952)
- Governor-General – David Hurley (since July 1, 2019)
- Prime Minister – Scott Morrison (since August 24, 2018)

==== Ashmore and Cartier Islands ====
Ashmore and Cartier Islands, located in the Indian Ocean, is an uninhabited territory of Australia; administered from Canberra by the Department of Regional Australia, Local Government, Arts and Sport.

==== Christmas Island ====
Christmas Island, located in the Indian Ocean, is a non-self governing territory of Australia; administered from Canberra by the Department of Regional Australia, Local Government, Arts and Sport.

- Governor General of the Commonwealth of Australia: David Hurley (since July 1, 2019)
- Administrator: Natasha Griggs (since October 5, 2018)

==== Cocos (Keeling) Islands ====
Cocos (Keeling) Islands, located in the Indian Ocean, is a non-self governing territory of Australia; administered from Canberra by the Department of Regional Australia, Local Government, Arts and Sport.

- Governor General: David Hurley (since July 1, 2019)
- Administrator: Natasha Griggs (since October 5, 2018)

==== Coral Sea Islands ====
The Coral Sea Islands is a territory of Australia administered from Canberra by the Department of Regional Australia, Local Government, Arts, and Sport.

==== Norfolk Island ====
Norfolk Island is a self-governing territory of Australia; administered from Canberra by the Department of Regional Australia, Local Government, Arts, and Sport.

- Administrator: Eric Hutchinson (since April 1, 2017)

=== East Timor / Timor-Leste ===
The Democratic Republic of Timor-Leste became independent from Portugal in 1975 and from Indonesia in 2002.

- President of East Timor: Francisco Guterres (since 2017)
- Prime Minister: Taur Matan Ruak (since 2018)

=== Fiji ===
The Republic of Fiji gained its independence from the United Kingdom in 1970 and became a republic in 1987.

- Head of State:
  - Queen Elizabeth (1970-1987)
  - George Konrote (since November 12, 2015)
- Head of Government: Frank Bainimarama (since January 5, 2007)
- Speaker: Epeli Nailatikau (since February 11, 2019)

=== Kiribati ===
The Republic of Kiribati is a member of the Commonwealth of Nations that became independent in 1979.

- Chief of state: Queen Elizabeth II (since February 6, 1952)
- President: Taneti Mamau (since March 11, 2016)

=== Marshall Islands ===
The Republic of the Marshall Islands is an associated state of the United States.

- President
  - Hilda Heine (January 28, 2016 – January 13, 2020) Heine was the first woman president of a Pacific island nation.
  - David Kabua (since January 13, 2020)
- Speaker: Kenneth Kedi (since January 4, 2016)

=== Micronesia ===
The Federated States of Micronesia is an independent republic and an associated state of the United States.

- President of the Federated States of Micronesia: David W. Panuelo (since 11 May 2019)
  - Vice President of the Federated States of Micronesia: Yosiwo George (since May 11, 2015)

=== Nauru ===
The Republic of Nauru gained its independence in 1969 and is a member of the Commonwealth of Nations.

- Chief of state: Queen Elizabeth II (since February 6, 1952)
- President of Nauru: Lionel Aingimea (since August 27, 2019)
- Speaker: Marcus Stephen (since August 27, 2019)

=== Palau ===
The Republic of Palau was established in 1979 and it became an associated state of the United States in 1994.

- President of Palau: Thomas Remengesau Jr. (since January 17, 2013)
  - Vice President of Palau: Raynold Oilouch (since January 19, 2017)

=== Papua New Guinea ===
The Independent State of Papua New Guinea declared its independence from Australia in 1975 and is a member of the Commonwealth of Nations.

- Monarch: Elizabeth II
- Governor-General of Papua New Guinea: Bob Dadae (since February 28, 2017)
- Prime Minister of Papua New Guinea: James Marape (since May 30, 2019)

=== Realm of New Zealand ===
The Realm of New Zealand consists of the sovereign state of New Zealand, the associated states of the Cook Islands and Niue, and the dependent territory of Tokelau. It also includes the Antarctica territorial claim of the Ross Dependency.

- Monarchy of New Zealand: Elizabeth II
- Governor-General of New Zealand: Patsy Reddy

==== New Zealand ====
New Zealand signed the Statute of Westminster Adoption Act 1947 and is a member of the Commonwealth of Nations.

- Speaker of the New Zealand House of Representatives: Trevor Mallard
- Prime Minister of New Zealand: Jacinda Ardern
- Deputy Prime Minister of New Zealand:
  - Winston Peters (until 6 November)
  - Grant Robertson (starting 6 November)

==== Cook Islands ====
The Cook Islands is a self-governing country in free association with New Zealand.

- Queen's Representative: Tom Marsters (since July 27, 1973)
- Prime Minister of the Cook Islands:
  - Henry Puna (until 1 October)
  - Mark Brown (starting 1 October)
- Speaker of the Cook Islands Parliament: Niki Rattle (since May 22, 2012)

==== Niue ====
Niue is a self-governing state in free association with New Zealand.

- Premier of Niue:
  - Toke Talagi (until 11 June)
  - Dalton Tagelagi (starting 11 June)

==== Tokelau ====
Tokelau is a self-administering dependent territory of New Zealand.

- Administrator of Tokelau: Ross Ardern (since May 2018)
- Head of Government of Tokelau:
  - Kerisiano Kalolo (until 9 March)
  - Fofo Tuisano (starting 9 March)

=== Samoa ===
The Independent State of Samoa became independent from New Zealand in 1962.

- Head of state: O le Ao o le Malo: Va'aletoa Sualauvi II (since July 21, 2017)
- Head of government: Prime Minister of Samoa: Tuilaepa Aiono Sailele Malielegaoi (since November 23, 1998)

=== Solomon Islands ===
The Solomon Islands became independent from the United Kingdom in 1978 and is a member of the Commonwealth of Nations.

- Governor-General: David Vunagi (since July 8, 2019)
- Prime Minister: Rick Hou (since April 24, 2019)

=== Tonga ===
The Kingdom of Tonga became independent from British protection in 1970 and became a constitutional monarchy in 2010.

- Head of state: Monarch: King Tupou VI (since March 18, 2012; coronation July 4, 2015)
- Head of government: Prime Minister: Pohiva Tuʻiʻonetoa (since October 8, 2019)
  - Deputy Prime Minister: vacant

=== Tuvalu ===
Tuvalu became independent from the United Kingdom in 1978 and is a member of the Commonwealth of Nations.

- Head of State: Queen Elizabeth II
  - Governor-General of Tuvalu: Teniku Talesi (since August 22, 2019)
- Prime Minister of Tuvalu: Kausea Natano (since September 19, 2019)

=== Vanuatu ===
The Republic of Vanuatu became independent from France and the United Kingdom in 1980 and is a republic within the Commonwealth of Nations.

- Head of state: President of Vanuatu: Tallis Obed Moses (since July 6, 2017)
- Head of government: Prime Minister of Vanuatu
  - Charlot Salwai (February 11, 2016 – April 20, 2020)
  - Bob Loughman (since April 20, 2020)

== Dependencies ==
=== British Overseas Territories ===
(United Kingdom) The British Overseas Territories are territories that have not been granted independence. Most are self-governing and are lightly populated.

- Chief of state: Queen Elizabeth II (since February 6, 1952)

==== Pitcairn Islands ====
The Pitcairn Islands are the only British Overseas Territory located in the Pacific Ocean.

- Governor (nonresident) of the Pitcairn Islands: Laura Clarke (since January 25, 2018)
- Mayor and Chairman of the Island Council: Charlene Warren-Peu (since January 1, 2020)

=== Chile ===
Chile declared its independence from Spain on September 18, 1810.

- President of Chile: Sebastián Piñera (since March 11, 2018)

==== Insular Chile ====
(Valparaíso Region)

- Intendant of Valparaíso Region: Jorge Martínez Durán
- Commune of the Juan Fernández Islands
  - Mayor: Felipe Paredes Vergara
- Province of Easter Island
  - Governor: Laura Alarcón Rapu (since March 16, 2018)

=== France ===
(France) French colonization of Oceania began in 1834 when Catholic missionaries arrived in Tahiti.

- President of France: Emmanuel Macron (since May 14, 2017)
- Prime Minister of France
  - Édouard Philippe (until 9 July)
  - Jean Castex (starting 9 July)

==== French Polynesia ====
French Polynesia is an overseas collectivity of France since 2003, though it is often referred to as an overseas country due the to its degree of autonomy.

- President of French Polynesia: Édouard Fritch (since September 12, 2014)
- High Commissioner of the Republic: Dominique Sorain (since July 10, 2019)

==== New Caledonia ====
New Caledonia is a special collectivity of France since 1998.

- High Commissioner: Laurent Prevost (since August 5, 2019)
- President of the Government: Thierry Santa (since July 9, 2019)
  - Temporary Vice President: Gilbert Tyuienon (since July 9, 2019)

==== Wallis and Futuna ====
Wallis and Futuna is an overseas collectivity of France since 2003.

- High Administrator: Thierry Queffelec (until 25 November)
- President of the Territorial Assembly
  - Atoloto Kolokilagi (until 26 November)
  - Nivaleta Iloai (starting 26 November)
- There are three traditional kings with limited powers.

=== United States ===
The United States expansion into the Pacific beginning with Baker Island and Howland Island in 1857.

- President of the United States: Donald Trump (since January 20, 2017)
  - Vice President of the United States: Mike Pence (since January 20, 2017)

==== American Samoa ====
American Samoa is an unincorporated unorganized territory of the U.S.

- Governor: Lolo Matalasi Moliga (January 3, 2013 – present)
  - Lieutenant Governor: Lemanu Peleti Mauga (January 3, 2013 – present)

==== Guam ====
Guam is an unincorporated organized territory of the U.S.

- Governor: Lou Leon Guerrero (January 7, 2019 – present)
  - Lieutenant Governor: Josh Tenorio (January 7, 2019 – present)

==== Hawaii ====
Hawaii became a state of the United States on August 21, 1959. It consists of eight major islands and 129 smaller islands.

- Governor of Hawaii: David Ige (since December 1, 2014)
  - Lieutenant Governor of Hawaii: Josh Green (since December 3, 2018)

==== Northern Mariana Islands ====
Northern Mariana Islands is a commonwealth in political union with and under the sovereignty of the United States.

- Governor: Ralph Deleon Guerrero Torres (December 19, 2015 – present)
  - Lieutenant Governor: Arnold Palacios (January 14, 2019 - present)

==== United States Minor Outlying Islands ====
The United States Minor Outlying Islands are small, isolated islands or atolls in the Pacific Ocean. Most are uninhabited, although they may be administered by the United States Fish and Wildlife Service as National Wildlife Refuges. They are unincorporated territories of the U.S.

== Events ==
=== January ===
- January 1
  - New Year's Day
    - 2020 New Year Honours in the Commonwealth
  - The death toll from the current bushfire season in the South Coast of New South Wales, Australia, rises to seven.
- January 2
  - Takai Commission Holiday, Niue
  - Premier Daniel Andrews declares a state of disaster for six local government areas and three alpine resorts in Victoria, Australia, due to unprecedented risk from bushfires. Two people are confirmed to have died in eastern Victoria from the fires, with 17 people missing.
- January 5 – The Australian town of Eden, New South Wales is evacuated due to the bushfires.
- January 20 – Martin Luther King Jr. Day, United States and territories
- January 25 – Chinese New Year / Year of the Rat, Christmas Island
- January 26 – Australia Day
  - 2020 Australia Day Honours
- January 29
  - Gov. Lolo Matalasi Moliga of American Samoa declared a state of emergency due to the COVID-19 pandemic. The state of emergency was extended on February 28.
  - The Northern Mariana Islands declares a state of emergency due to the COVID-19 pandemic.
  - 81 Chinese nationals who arrived in Dravuni, Kadavu, and Suva; Fiji, via cruise liner Majestic Princess, were deemed safe by health officials.

=== February ===
- February 3
  - The tourism industry in Queensland, Australia, is hit hard by the COVID-19 pandemic.
  - A state of emergency is declared in Milford Sound, New Zealand, as rain and flooding hit the region.
- February 6 – Waitangi Day in New Zealand and Niue
- February 17 – Washington's Birthday, United States and territories
- February 20 – Australian Prime Minister Scott Morrison announces that a royal commission will look into the bushfires that devastated the country last summer. 18 million hectares (44 million acres) burned, 28 people died, and 3,000 homes were destroyed.
- February 28
  - New Zealand Prime Minister Jacinda Ardern state visit to Fiji.
  - The first case of the COVID-19 pandemic in New Zealand is confirmed. They had recently returned from Iran via Bali.

=== March ===
- March 1
  - Yap Day, Federated States of Micronesia
  - Australia records its first death from the COVID-19 pandemic.
- March 3 – Democratic presidential caucuses in American Samoa: Michael Bloomberg (49.9%) wins four delegates for the Democratic presidential nomination and Tulsi Gabbard (29.3%) gets two. On March 4 Bloomberg drops out and endorses Joe Biden.
- March 3 to 10 – 2020 Democrats Abroad primary: Proportional to the numbers of people from different regions voting, the Asia-Pacific region is allocated one of the nine regional delegates. Overall, Bernie Sanders (57.9%) wins nine delegates for the Democratic presidential nomination and Joe Biden (22.7%) gets four.
- March 5
  - Missionary Day, French Polynesia
  - A truck collides with a sacred stone figure on Easter Island.
- March 7 - Guam History and Chamorro Heritage Day
- March 8 – International Women's Day (celebrated in some localities on March 9)
- March 10 – Niue becomes the world's first dark sky country.
- March 13 – New Zealand reports six cases of COVID-19, Australia reports 248, including three deaths. French Polynesia reports three cases. There are no other reports within the region at this time.
- March 14
  - The world's longest passenger flight flew 9,765 miles from Papeete, Tahiti to Charles de Gaulle Airport in Paris without making its usual stop in Los Angeles, California.
  - Democratic presidential caucuses in the Northern Mariana Islands: Bernie Sanders (62.7%) wins four delegates for the Democratic presidential nomination and Joe Biden (35.8%) gets two.
- March 15
  - Guam reports its first three cases of COVID-19.
  - In a historic first, all Peace Corps volunteers worldwide are withdrawn from their host countries.
- March 16 – The government of Guam shuts down for 14 days, including all schools.
- March 19 – Two cruise ships are prevented from disembarking in Honolulu despite not having any cases of COVID-19 on board.
- March 20 – 2020 Vanuatuan general election The preliminary count gives 30 of the 52 seats available to the four leading parties. None of the 16 women who ran for election came close to winning.
- March 25 – A State of National Emergency is declared in response to coronavirus in New Zealand. New Zealand is upgraded to alert level 4, and the country enters a four-week lockdown period.
- March 26
  - The perpetrator of the 2019 Christchurch mosque shootings in New Zealand pleads guilty to all 51 murder charges, as well as 40 charges of attempted murder and one charge of engaging in a terrorist act laid under the Terrorism Suppression Act 2002.
  - Prince Kūhiō Day, Hawaii
- March 27 – Space Fence opens in Kwajalein Atoll, Marshall Islands
- March 28 – Queensland local government elections, Australia. Results here
- March 31 – Culture Day, Federated States of Micronesia

=== April ===
- April 1 – With between 150 and 200 cases of COVID-19, healthy sailors aboard the USS Theodore Roosevelt disembark to be quarantined in hotels on Guam. Infected crew members will stay on Naval Base Guam. About 10% of the crew are required to remain on the ship nuclear-powered aircraft carrier.
- April 2 – The 5,000 crew members of the USS Roosevelt cheered Captain Brett Crozier after he was relieved of duty for speaking up about the coronavirus outbreak on the ship. 60,000 people had signed a petition from Change.org asking for his reinstatement.
- April 3
  - Easter Island (or Rapa Nui) reports two cases of COVID-19. The 3,000 inhabitants of the island are nearly 100% dependent upon tourism which has been shut off. There is a daily curfew from 2:00 p.m. to 5:00 a.m. and people fear they may soon be forced to beg for food.
  - The Solomon Islands says dozens of people could be lost at sea as Cyclone Harold hits the islands.
- April 4
  - Vanuatu is on alert for Cyclone Harold.
  - COVID-19
    - Fiji announces a sharp increase in COVID-19 cases from seven to twelve.
    - Guam has two more COVID-19 deaths and two more positive tests, bringing the total number of cases to 84.
    - New Caledonia president Thierry Santa moves into self-isolation after a member of her crisis management team tested positive.
    - New Zealand reports 52 new confirmed infections, bringing the total to 950.
    - Seventy-eight New Zealanders remain on 12 cruise ships because of COVID-19-related travel restrictions around the world.
- April 7 – The High Court of Australia unanimously quashes Cardinal George Pell convictions and substitutes verdicts of acquittal.
- April 8 – National Health Day, Kiribati
- April 10 – Good Friday (Christian holiday)
- April 13
  - Easter Monday (Christian holiday)
  - Since March 23, 561 Fijians have been repatriated and 1,157 visitors to Fiji have been evacuated.
- April 14 – A week after Tropical Cyclone Harold, a Category 5 superstorm, 35% of the population (100,000 people) of Vanuatu is homeless. Three people died, but the death toll is expected to rise. 27 people died in the Solomon Islands and one died in Fiji. No deaths were reported in Tonga, but 400 homes were destroyed.
- April 19 – Twenty-two new cases of COVID-19 infections in Taiwan are reported in sailors who recently visited Palau. Palau has not had any reported cases.
- April 20
  - The U.S. Air Force Global Strike Command announces that after 16 years it is ending its ending the continuous bomber presence (CBP) mission in Guam in favor of forward-deploying bombers to the Indo-Pacific. The B-1B Lancer, B-52, and B-2 Spirit used to rotate back and forth to Andersen Air Force Base, but the B-1 was phased out in 2018. On April 18, B-1s flew from Ellsworth Air Force Base, South Dakota, to Misawa Air Base, Japan.
  - French Polynesian president Edouard Fritch says he is against across-the-board pay cuts for ministers and assembly members as suggested by the opposition.
  - Second round of 2020 Kiribati parliamentary election.
- April 25
  - Anzac Day: Most public celebrations cancelled, but private memorials are held.
  - Former Tonga Prime Minister Sialeʻataongo Tuʻivakanō receives a two-year suspended sentence, and a $US1,700 fine for passport, perjury, and firearm offenses.
  - Trade unions in French Polynesia reject the government's COVID-19 pandemic relief package.
- April 28 – St. Peter Chanel Day, Wallis and Fortuna. Chanel is the Catholic patron saint of Oceania, buried on Fortuna Island.

=== May ===
- May 1
  - International Workers' Day
  - Constitution Day, Marshall Islands
- May 3
  - Labour Day, Queensland, Australia
  - Mothers' Day, Samoa
- May 4
  - Youth Day, Fiji
  - Authorities from Australia and New Zealand meet to establish a coronavirus-free travel zone.
- May 8
  - Vavaʻu Festival Week and ʻEua Tourism Festival, Tonga
  - New Zealand announces its support for the inclusion of Taiwan in the World Health Organization.
- May 10 – Constitution Day, Micronesia
- May 16 – China opens an embassy in Kiribati.
- May 20
  - Restoration of Independence, East Timor
  - COVID-19 pandemic: Alyza Alder, 18, from Gilbert, Arizona, was visiting Hawaii when she was arrested after allegedly violating the state's mandatory order that tourists and returning residents self-isolate for 14 days. Hawaii has had 643 confirmed cases and 17 deaths from COVID-19.
- May 22
  - May 2020 New Zealand National Party leadership election. Todd Muller and Nikki Kaye won.
  - 2020 Hawaii Democratic presidential primary: Joe Biden (60.5%) wins 16 delegates for the Democratic presidential nomination and Bernie Sanders (35.2%) gets eight.
- May 23 – The former prime minister of Papua New Guinea, Peter O'Neill, is arrested and taken in for questioning over alleged misappropriation and corruption involving the purchase of two power generators from Israel for 50 million kina ($14.2 million).
- May 23 and 24 – Eid al-Fitr Muslim holiday (breaking the fast)
- May 24 – A 5.8M_{w} earthquake strikes New Zealand; Prime Minister Jacinda Ardern continues a television interview. No damages or injuries are reported.
- May 25 – Memorial Day, Hawaii and U.S. territories

=== June ===
- June 1
  - Queen's Official Birthday, New Zealand and associated islands
  - Independence Day, Samoa
- June 1 to 5 – Thousands of demonstrators march across Australia and New Zealand in protest of police brutality in the United States as well as Racism in Australia and discrimination against the Māori people in New Zealand.
- June 2 – Three thousand demonstrators in Sydney, Australia, protest the murder of George Floyd in the United States. Amelia Brace, a reporter for Australian television network Channel 7, is knocked down by police live on air as she covered George Floyd protests in Washington, D.C.
- June 6
  - Democratic presidential caucuses in Guam: Joe Biden (69.6%) wins five delegates for the Democratic presidential nomination and Bernie Sanders (30.4%) gets two.
- June 7 – Independence Day, Solomon Islands
- June 8
  - Bounty Day, Pitcairn Islands and Norfolk Island
  - Haʻapai Tourism Festival, Tonga
- June 11 – King Kamehameha I Day, Hawaii
- June 13 – Birthday of Queen Elizabeth II (celebrated in the Commonwealth and in British territories)
- June 29 – Internal Autonomy Day, French Polynesia

=== July ===
- July 1 – Flights from Canberra to Wellington resume.
- July 2 – Discovery Day, Pitcairn Islands
- July 3 – Fishermen's Holiday, Marshall Islands
- July 4 – COVID-19 pandemic: 3,000 people in nine residential towers in Melbourne, Australia are confined to their buildings in the country's strictest lockdown as new infections rise in the area.
- July 4 – Independence Day, United States (celebrated in Hawaii and U.S. territories)
- July 7
  - COVID-19 pandemic
    - Fourteen flight attendants from Hawaiian Airlines test positive for coronavirus and go into quarantine.
    - Authorities in New Zealand say they will press charges against a 32-year-old coronavirus patient who escaped quarantine in Auckland and went shopping at a supermarket.
- July 8
  - Heilala Festival Week, Tonga
  - A new study from Stanford University shows that people from four island sites in French Polynesia bore DNA indicative of interbreeding with South Americans most closely related to present-day indigenous Colombians at around 1200 AD. People from Chile's Rapa Nui (Easter Island) also had South American ancestry.
- July 9
  - Constitution Day, Palau (1981)
  - Australia ends its extradition treaty with Hong Kong.
- July 10 – Gospel Day, Kiribati
- July 12 – Independence Day, Kiribati
- July 14 – Bastille Day (celebrated in French territories)
- July 17 – A 7.0M_{w} earthquake with an epicenter in Morobe Patrol Post, New Guinea, is recorded. Only minor damages are reported.
- July 21 – Liberation Day, Guam
- July 23 – Remembrance Day, Papua New Guinea
- July 24 – Children's Day, Vanuatu
- July 29 – Territory Day, Wallis and Futuna
- July 30 – Independence Day, Vanuatu

=== August ===
- August 3
  - Labour Day, Samoa
  - National Children's Day / Tamaliki, Tuvalu
- August 4 – Three men are rescued from Pikelot Island, 43 kilometers (27 miles) from Pulap atoll, Micronesia, after writing SOS in the sand.
- August 9 – COVID-19 pandemic: New Zealand goes 100 days without any new infections.
- August 11
  - COVID-19 pandemic in Hawaii: The state records the highest transmission rate in the U.S. at 1.6, although overall infections remain low at 3,638 cases total.
  - COVID-19 pandemic in New Zealand: Authorities are looking into the possibility that a new outbreak of the virus was introduced in a freight shipment.
- August 15 – Assumption of Mary (Christian holiday)
- August 18 – The United States Department of Defense investigates two masked, uniformed soldiers who joined American Samoa Governor Lolo Matalasi Moliga (D), who appeared online during the 2020 Democratic National Convention.
- August 22 – 2020 Northern Territory general election
- August 24 – COVID-19 pandemic: Ten countries (Kiribati, Marshall Islands, Micronesia, Nauru, Palau, Tonga, Tuvalu, Samoa, Solomon Islands, and Vanuatu) have not had confirmed cases of coronavirus, although their economies have been hurt by a fall in tourism.
- August 26 – Repentance Day, Papua New Guinea
- August 30 – Popular Consultation Day, East Timor
- August 31 – COVID-19 pandemic: Hawaii requires visitors to complete a "Safe Travels" digital app 24 hours before their flights.

=== September ===
- September 4
  - Labor Day, Marshall Islands
  - Palau invites the United States to construct land bases, port facilities, and airfields on its territory.
- September 7 – Labor Day, Hawaii and U.S. territories
- September 8 – Members of the Colorado cult "Love has Won Cult” are deported after complaints of cultural appropriation.
- September 16 – Independence Day, Papua New Guinea
- September 18 – Independence Day, Chile
- September 20 – Two men who were working to clear unexploded World War II bombs are killed in an explosion in Honiara, Solomon Islands.
- September 23 – Ishmael Toroama, a former rebel leader, is elected president of Autonomous Region of Bougainville, Papua New Guinea.
- September 24 – New Caledonia Day
- September 25
  - Manit Day, Marshall Islands
  - Youth Day, Nauru

=== October ===
- October 1
  - Independence Day, Palau (1994)
  - Tuvalu Day
- October 5
  - Labour Day in Australian Capital Territory, New South Wales and South Australia
  - Education Day, Kiribati
  - Constitution Day, Vanuatu
- October 6 – Territory Day, Christmas Island
- October 10 – Fiji Week (Fiji Independence Day)
- October 11 – White Sunday; Samoa, American Samoa, Tokelau, and Tonga
- October 12 – Columbus Day, Hawaii and U.S. territories; Chile and Easter Island
- October 22 – Peniamina Gospel Day, Niue
- October 26
  - Gospel Day, Cook Islands
  - Angam Day, Nauru
  - Labour Day, New Zealand
- October (date unknown) – Rowman & Littlefield releases Poisoning the Pacific: The US Military's Secret Dumping of Plutonium, Chemical Weapons, and Agent Orange by Jon Mitchell (ISBN 978-1-5381-3033-9), which details how the U.S. military has exposed 600,000 people to toxins in Japan and Micronesia.

=== November ===
- November 1 – All Saints' Day, Christian holiday
- November 2 – All Souls' Day, Christian holiday
- November 3 – Independence Day, Micronesia
- November 6 – Arbor Day, Samoa
- November 9 – Heir to the Throne's birthday, Commonwealth countries
- November 11 – Veterans Day, Hawaii, U.S. territories, Micronesia; Armistice Day in France and French territories
- November 12 – National Youth Day, Anniversary of the Santa Cruz massacre; East Timor
- November 14 – Diwali, Hindu festival of lights; Fiji
- November 17 – Presidents' Day, Marshall Islands
- November 26 – Thanksgiving, Hawaii and U.S. territories; Micronesia
- November 28 – Proclamation of Independence Day, East Timor
- November 29 – National Unity Day, Vanuatu

=== December ===
- December 4 – Gospel Day, Marshall Islands
- December 8 – Santa Marian Kamalen, Guam
- December 10
  - Human Rights and Peace Day, Kiribati
  - A new report by the University of California, Berkeley and Stanford University warns that the Marshall Islands and other island countries may disappear by mid-century due to climate change.
- December 17
  - Fiji imposes a curfew in anticipation of Cyclone Yasa, a Category 5 storm that is expected to make landall on December 18.
  - COVID-19 pandemic: New Zealand Prime Minister Jacinda Ardern says that her country has contracts to buy more vaccine doses than are needed and will share the excess with neighbors.
- December 20
  - The U.S. House of Representatives passes legislation to restore Medicaid to Marshall Islanders in the United States.
  - COVID-19 pandemic: Samoa, Kiribati, Federated States of Micronesia, Tonga, Palau, Tuvalu, and Nauru plus North Korea and Turkmenistan in Asia are the only countries that have no reported cases of the virus.
- December 21 – Kīlauea volcano on Hawaii's Big Island erupts.
- December 22 – Two Russian Tupolev Tu-95 strategic bombers and four Chinese H-6K bombers fly over the Sea of Japan and the East China Sea.
- December 28 – COVID-19 pandemic: The Associated Press reports that several island countries are facing food shortages, generally related to border closings.

== Scheduled ==
=== Elections ===
- Australia
  - Northern Territory general election, August 22, 2020
  - Tasmanian Legislative Council elections Due to the COVID-19 outbreak, the Tasmanian Government has taken the decision to defer these elections, with the aim to have polling day in August this year.
  - Australian Capital Territory election, October 17, 2020
  - Queensland state election, October 31, 2020
  - Norfolk Island Regional Council election, date TBA
- 2020 Kiribati parliamentary election April 7 with a second round on August 15
- Micronesia
  - Chuukese independence referendum, postponed for the third time to 2022
- New Caledonian independence referendum, September 6
- 2020 New Zealand general election and 2020 New Zealand cannabis referendum, September 19
- Election for the Niue Fono Exeule (Niuean Assembly) May 31 (not confirmed)
- 2020 Palauan general election November
- 2020 United States elections
  - American Samoa
    - Presidential caucuses – March 3 (D), March 18 (R)
    - Gubernatorial election – November 3
    - House of Representatives election – November 3 (non-voting delegate)
  - Guam
    - Presidential caucuses – March 14 (R), June 6 (D)
    - House of Representatives election – November 3 (non-voting delegate)
  - Hawaii
    - Democratic presidential primary – May 22
    - Republican presidential primary – cancelled
    - Presidential election – November 3
    - House of Representatives elections – November 3
  - Northern Mariana Islands
    - Presidential caucuses – March 14 (D), March 15 (R)
    - House of Representatives election – November 3 (non-voting delegate)

=== National and territorial holidays ===
==== September to December ====
- December 25 – Christmas Day (Christian holiday)
- December 26
  - Thanksgiving, Solomon Islands
  - Family Day, Vanuatu
- December 28 – Boxing Day, Commonwealth
- December 31 – National Heroes Day, East Timor

== Culture ==
=== Television ===
The long-running Australian soap opera Neighbours continues filming by limiting studio access and practicing social distancing. As of April 21, the country reported 6,547 cases of infection and 67 deaths related to COVID-19.

== Sports ==
=== By sport ===
Association football / soccer

- 2019–20 in Australian soccer
- 2020 Fiji Premier League
- 2019–20 Papua New Guinea National Soccer League
- 2019–20 Solomon Islands S-League
- 2019–20 Tahiti Ligue 1
- 2019–20 Luganville Premier League, Vanuatu
- 2019–20 Port Vila Premier League, Vanuatu

Football

- 2020 Hawaii Rainbow Warriors football team

Tennis

- 2020 Fed Cup Asia/Oceania Zone, tennis

=== By date ===
- October 3, 2019 to February 16, 2020 – 2019–20 NBL regular season, basketball
- November 8, 2019 to 2020 – 2019–20 Tahiti Cup, association football
- October 11, 2019 to May 16 or 17, 2020 – 2019–20 A-League, Australia
- November 16, 2019 to February 1 or 2, 2020 – 2019–20 Y-League, Australia
- January 6 to 12 – 2020 BNP Paribas de Nouvelle-Calédonie, New Caledonia tennis
- January 3 to 12 – ATP Cup, Australian tennis
- January 6 to 18 – 2020 ASB Classic, New Zealand tennis
- January 15 to March 17 – 2020 UCI Oceania Tour, New Zealand Cycle Classic
- January 17 to February 16 – 2020 Toyota Racing Series
- January 25 and 26, 2020
  - 2020 New Zealand Sevens, rugby
  - 2020 New Zealand Women's Sevens
- January 25 to 31 – 2020 OFC Champions League qualifying stage
- January 25 to February 13 – South Africa women's cricket team in New Zealand in 2019–20
- January 26 – 2020 Hula Bowl, Hawaii football, won by Team Kai (West)
- February 7 to March 11 – Australia women's national soccer team results (2020–29)
- February 15 to March 7 – 2020 OFC Champions League group stage
- February 16 to March 15
  - 2019–20 NBL season
  - 2020 WNBL Finals won by University of Canberra Capitals
- February 22 – 2020 All Stars match, Australian rugby won by New Zealand Māori rugby league team
- February 23 – UFC Fight Night: Felder vs. Hooker
- March 6 to 14 – 2020 World Rugby Pacific Challenge won by Fiji Warriors
- March 8 to 15 – 2020 NBL Finals won by Perth Wildcats
- March 12 to March 23 – 2020 NRL season (suspension)
- March 14 to August 22 – 2020 State Basketball League season
- March 21 – 2020 W-League Grand Final, Australia; Melbourne City FC (W-League) beat Sydney FC (W-League), 1-0
- April 24 – Vanuatu becomes the first country to host a live cricket match after the onset of the COVID-19 pandemic.
- July – 2020 OFC U-19 Championship, Samoa
- August 8 to September 27 – 2020 Rugby Championship
- October 2020 to February 2021 – 2020–21 NBL season

== Deaths ==
=== January to March ===
- January 16 – Barry Tuckwell, Australian horn player and conductor (b. 1931)
- January 18 – Piri Sciascia, Māori leader, kapa haka exponent, university administrator (b. 1946)
- January 19
  - Manfred Clynes, Australian scientist, inventor and musician (died in the United States) (b. 1925)
  - David Leach, Australian Chief of the Naval Staff from 1982 to 1985 (b. 1928)
- January 21 – Ian Tuxworth, 2nd Chief Minister of the Northern Territory, Australia (b. 1942)
- January 23 – Peter Salama, Australian epidemiologist (died in Switzerland) (b. 1968)
- January 25
  - Shirley Murray, 88, New Zealand hymn writer
  - Alison Roxburgh, 85, New Zealand women's rights advocate and community leader
- January 26 – Gordon McLauchlan, 89, New Zealand author, social historian, and television and radio presenter
- January 31 – Tony Ford, 77–78, New Zealand lawyer and jurist, Chief Justice of the Kingdom of Tonga (2006–2010)
- February 2 – Mike Moore (New Zealand politician), former prime minister (b. 1949)
- February 3 – Josefa Rika, 32, Fijian cricketer (national team).
- February 4 – Andrew Brough, New Zealand singer, songwriter, and guitarist
- February 6 – Emma Jolliff, New Zealand journalist and television presenter (Newshub); cancer
- February 13
  - Sir Des Britten, 80, New Zealand television chef, restaurateur and Anglican priest, cancer.
  - Ronne Arnold, Australian dancer, choreographer and actor (b. 1938)
  - Jimmy Thunder, 54, Samoan-born New Zealand heavyweight boxer, Commonwealth Games champion (1986); complications from brain surgery
- February 15 – Alan Henderson, 57, New Zealand television cameraman and puppeteer (Thingee), prostate cancer.
- February 16 – June Dally-Watkins, Australian model, businesswoman and etiquette coach (b. 1927)
- February 26 – Satya Nandan, Fijian diplomat, representative to the United Nations (1970–1976, 1993–1995) and ambassador to the Netherlands (1976–1980)
- February 28 – Esala Teleni, Fijian rugby player and military officer
- March 4
  - Ivan Lee, 63–64, Australian Anglican bishop, Bishop of the Western Region (2003–2019)
  - Kerry Marshall, 81, New Zealand politician, mayor of Richmond (1986–1989), Tasman (1989–1998), and Nelson (2007–2010).
- March 5 – Jeanette Fitzsimons, 75, New Zealand politician and environmentalist, co-leader of the Green Party (1995–2009) and MP (1996–2010), stroke.
- March 9 – John Bathersby, 83, Australian Roman Catholic prelate, Archbishop of Brisbane (1991–2011), Bishop of Cairns (1986–1991).
- March 11 – Rob Fenwick, 68, New Zealand environmentalist and businessman, cancer.
- March 12
  - Kevin Bacon, 87, Australian Olympic equestrian (1964, 1968, 1976).
  - Don Burrows, 91, Australian jazz musician.
- March 14 – Henry Smith, 64, Samoan Olympic athlete (1984, 1988).
- March 22 – Peter Stapleton, 65, New Zealand musician (The Terminals, Dadamah, Flies Inside the Sun).
- March 30
  - Arianne Caoili, 33, Filipino-Australian chess player, traffic collision.
  - Milutin Knežević, 71, Serbian Orthodox prelate, Bishop of Australia and New Zealand (2003–2006) and Valjevo (since 2006), COVID-19.

=== April to June ===
- April 7 – Te Huirangi Waikerepuru, 91, New Zealand trade unionist and Māori language activist
- April 14 – Dean Parker, New Zealand screenwriter, journalist, political commentator (b. 1947)
- April 15 – Finau Mara, 60, Fijian diplomat and politician, Ambassador-at-large (since 2001).
- April 21 - Laisenia Qarase, former Fijian Prime Minister and politician.
- April 23 – Bruce Allpress, 89, New Zealand actor (Came a Hot Friday, The Lord of the Rings: The Two Towers, The Water Horse: Legend of the Deep); amyotrophic lateral sclerosis
- May 4
  - Alan Sutherland, 76, New Zealand rugby union player (Marlborough, national team)
  - Froilan Tenorio, 80, Northern Marianan politician, Governor (1994–1998) and Resident Representative (1984–1990)
- May 7 – Margaret Loutit, 90, Australian-born New Zealand microbiologist
- June 11 – Basil Meeking, 90, New Zealand Roman Catholic prelate, Bishop of Christchurch (1987–1995).

=== July to September ===
- July 12 – Jack Ah Kit, 69, Australian politician, Northern Territory MLA (1995–2005).
- July 15 – Toke Talagi, 69, Niuean diplomat and politician, MP (1999–2020) and Premier (2008–2020).
- July 18 – Derek Ho, 55, Hawaiian surfer
- August 15 – Tekii Lazaro, 66, Cook Islands politician, MP (2011–2018). (death announced on this date)
- September 4
  - Nandi Glassie, 69, Cook Islands politician, MP (2006–2018); cancer.
  - Joe Williams, 85, Cook Islands politician, Prime Minister (1999), Minister of Foreign Affairs (1999) and MP (1994–2004); COVID-19.
- September 8 – Benedict To Varpin, 84, Papua New Guinean Roman Catholic prelate, Bishop of Bereina (1979–1987) and Archbishop of Madang (1987–2001).

=== October to December ===
- October 12 – Litokwa Tomeing, 80, Marshallese politician, President of the Marshall Islands (2008–2009).
- October 14 – Kuniwo Nakamura, 76, Palauan politician, President of Palau (1993–2001) and Vice President of Palau (1989–1993).
- October 22 – Allan Migi, 59–60, Papua New Guinean Anglican prelate, primate and archbishop of the Anglican Church of Papua New Guinea (2017–2020).
- November 6 – Jim Marurai, 73, Cook Island politician, Prime Minister (2004–2010), Minister of Foreign Affairs (2009) and MP (1994–2017).
- November 13 – COVID-19 pandemic: Samoa reports its first case, although a second test in the same New Zealand sailor tests negative.
- November 26 – Tevita Momoedonu, 74, Fijian politician, Prime Minister of Fiji (2000, 2001).

== Television ==
- Australian Survivor: All Stars

== See also ==
- Tropical cyclones in 2020
  - 2019–20 Australian region cyclone season
  - 2020–21 Australian region cyclone season
  - 2019-20 South Pacific cyclone season
    - Cyclone Harold
  - 2020–21 South Pacific cyclone season
    - Cyclone Yasa
- COVID-19 pandemic in Oceania
  - COVID-19 pandemic on cruise ships
  - COVID-19 pandemic on USS Theodore Roosevelt
