= 2022 OFC Champions League final =

- Event: 2022 OFC Champions League
| Vénus | Auckland City |
| (French Polynesia) | (New Zealand) |
| 0 | 3 |
- Date: 17 August 2022
- Venue: Ngahue Reserve, Auckland
- Man of the Match: Gerard Garriga (Auckland City)
- Referee: David Yareboinen (Papua New Guinea)
- Attendance: 400
- Weather: Mostly cloudy/windy 17 °C (63 °F); 82% humidity

The 2022 OFC Champions League final was the final match of the 2022 OFC Champions League, the 21st edition of the Oceanian Club Championship, Oceania's premier club football tournament organized by the Oceania Football Confederation (OFC), and the 16th season under the current OFC Champions League name.

The final was contested as a single match between Tahitian team Vénus and New Zealand team Auckland City. The match took place at Ngahue Reserve in Auckland on 17 August 2022.

Auckland City won the final 3–0 for their tenth OFC Champions League title.

== Teams ==
In the following table, finals until 2006 were in the Oceania Club Championship era, since 2007 were in the OFC Champions League era.

| Team | Previous finals appearances (bold indicates winners) |
|---|---|
| (French Polynesia) Vénus | None |
| (New Zealand) Auckland City | 9 (**2006**, **2009**, **2011**, **2012**, **2013**, **2014**, **2015**, **2016**, **2017**) |

== Venue ==
Ngahue Reserve was the venue for the final. This was the first time that the stadium hosted an OFC Champions League final.

== Road to the final ==
Note: In all results below, the score of the finalist is given first (H: home; A: away; N: neutral).

| (French Polynesia) Vénus | | Round | (New Zealand) Auckland City | |
|---|---|---|---|---|
| Opponent | Result | Group stage | Opponent | Result |
| (Solomon Islands) Central Coast | 3–0 | Matchday 1 | (New Caledonia) Hienghène Sport | 5–0 |
| (Papua New Guinea) Lae City | 1–0 | Matchday 2 | (Fiji) Rewa | 3–0 |
| (Vanuatu) Galaxy | 0–1 | Matchday 3 | (Cook Islands) Nikao Sokattack | 4–1 |
| **Group A winners**: Pos / Team / Pld / Pts; **1** / (French Polynesia) Vénus / **3** / **6**; 2 / (Solomon Islands) Central Coast / 3 / **6**; 3 / (Vanuatu) Galaxy / 3 / **4**; 4 / (Papua New Guinea) Lae City / 3 / **1**; Source: OFC | | Final standings | **Group B winners**: Pos / Team / Pld / Pts; **1** / (New Zealand) Auckland City (H) / **3** / **9**; 2 / (New Caledonia) Hienghène Sport / 3 / **6**; 3 / (Fiji) Rewa / 3 / **3**; 4 / (Cook Islands) Nikao Sokattack / 3 / **0**; Source: OFC (H) Hosts | |
| Opponent | Result | Knockout stage | Opponent | Result |
| (New Caledonia) Hienghène Sport | 4–0 | Semi-finals | (Solomon Islands) Central Coast | 2–0 |

== Format ==
If the match was level at the end of 90 minutes of normal playing time, extra time would be played (two periods of 15 minutes each), where each team would be allowed to make a fourth substitution. If still tied after extra time, the match would be decided by a penalty shoot-out to determine the winners.

== Match ==
=== Details ===
17 August 2022
14:00 UTC+12

| Vénus (French Polynesia) | 0–3 | (New Zealand) Auckland City |
|---|---|---|
| | Report | Howieson 13' (pen.); Garriga 29'; Tade 88' |

Ngahue Reserve, Auckland
Attendance: 400
Referee: David Yareboinen (Papua New Guinea)

| **Vénus** | **Auckland City** |

| GK | 1 | (French Polynesia) Teave Teamotuaitau |
| RB | 2 | (French Polynesia) Tevaitini Teumere |
| CB | 8 | (New Caledonia) Pothin Poma |
| CB | 3 | (French Polynesia) Kévin Barbe | (yellow card) 53' |
| LB | 4 | (French Polynesia) Jean-Claude Paraue |
| CM | 11 | (French Polynesia) Roonui Tehau |
| CM | 17 | (French Polynesia) Terai Bremond |
| AM | 29 | (French Polynesia) Yann Pennequin-Le Bras |
| RF | 26 | (French Polynesia) Rainui Tze-Yu | | (substituted off) 85' |
| CF | 10 | (French Polynesia) Teaonui Tehau (c) |
| LF | 9 | (French Polynesia) Tauhiti Keck |
Substitutes:
| GK | 16 | (French Polynesia) Anapa Debruyne |
| GK | 22 | (French Polynesia) Indra Suarjana |
| DF | 13 | (French Polynesia) Ariimona Greseque |
| DF | 23 | (French Polynesia) Mauri Heitaa |
| MF | 15 | (French Polynesia) Teivarii Kaiha |
| MF | 20 | (French Polynesia) Mana Teniau |
| MF | 27 | (French Polynesia) Heiarii Tavanae | | (substituted on) 85' |
| FW | 6 | (French Polynesia) Manuarii Shan |
Manager:
(French Polynesia) Samuel Garcia

| GK | 1 | (New Zealand) Conor Tracey |
| RB | 15 | (New Zealand) Aidan Carey |
| CB | 3 | (New Zealand) Adam Mitchell |
| CB | 12 | (New Zealand) Sam Brotherton |
| LB | 14 | (New Zealand) Jordan Vale |
| CM | 8 | (Spain) Gerard Garriga | | (substituted off) 90+1' |
| CM | 2 | (New Zealand) Mario Ilich |
| CM | 7 | (New Zealand) Cameron Howieson (c) |
| RW | 10 | (New Zealand) Dylan Manickum |
| CF | 11 | (New Zealand) Ryan de Vries | | (substituted off) 63' |
| LW | 16 | (New Zealand) Joseph Lee | | (substituted off) 74' |
Substitutes:
| GK | 18 | (New Zealand) Finn Dockerty |
| GK | 24 | (New Zealand) Cameron Brown |
| DF | 4 | (New Zealand) Christian Gray |
| DF | 5 | (Spain) Ángel Berlanga |
| DF | 23 | (New Zealand) Alfie Rogers |
| MF | 6 | (New Zealand) Matt Ellis |
| MF | 17 | (New Zealand) Reid Drake | (yellow card) 76' | (substituted on) 74' |
| MF | 21 | (New Zealand) Ilham Hameedi |
| FW | 9 | (New Zealand) Will Eng |
| FW | 19 | (New Zealand) Liam Gillion | | (substituted on) 90+1' |
| FW | 20 | (Argentina) Emiliano Tade | | (substituted on) 63' |
Manager:
(Spain) Albert Riera

Man of the Match:
Gerard Garriga (Auckland City)

Assistant referees:
Bernard Mutukera (Solomon Islands)
Folio Moeaki (Tonga)
Fourth official:
Veer Singh (Fiji)
Fifth official:
Bertrand Brial (New Caledonia)

**Match rules**

- 90 minutes.
- 30 minutes of extra time if scores level.
- Penalty shoot-out if scores still level.
- Maximum of three substitutions, with a fourth allowed in extra time.
