= Jarves Aperau =

Cook Islands footballer

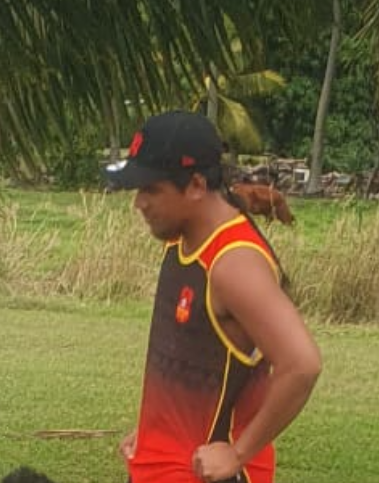
- Aperau in 2024

Personal information
- Full name: Jarves Ambrose Aperau
- Date of birth: 21 November 1997 (age 28)
- Place of birth: Auckland, New Zealand
- Height: 1.68 m (5 ft 6 in)
- Positions: Defender; midfielder

Team information
- Current team: Tupapa Maraerenga
- Number: 8

Senior career*
Years	Team	Apps	(Gls)
2012–2025	Puaikura		
2020	→ Tupapa Maraerenga (loan)		
2026–	Tupapa Maraerenga	3	(0)

International career^{‡}
2013	Cook Islands U17	4	(0)
2016	Cook Islands U19	6	(0)
2022–	Cook Islands		

Managerial career
- Puaikura U15
- Puaikura U18
- 2026–: Cook Islands U16
- 2026–: Cook Islands (coach)
- * Club domestic league appearances and goals as of 27 February 2026 ‡ National team caps and goals as of 27 February 2026

Jarves Aperau (born 21 November 1997) is an international footballer and coach from the Cook Islands. He plays as a defender for Tupapa Maraerenga in the Cook Islands Round Cup. He is originally from Mangaia, Mitiaro and Mauke.

== Club career ==
Aperau has played for Puaikura since 2012, playing in the Cook Islands Round Cup, the top flight of football in the Cook Islands He represented the club continentally, playing in the 2014–15 OFC Champions League and 2017 OFC Champions League.

He also featured in Tupapa Maraerenga's squad during the 2020 OFC Champions League qualifying stage. He has been a prominent member of the Puaikura team, playing his entire domestic career with the club and only once playing for another club, when he played with Tupapa Maraerenga during the 2020 OFC Champions League qualifying stage, he helped the club lift the 2013 Cook Islands Round Cup, 2016 Cook Islands Round Cup and 2016 Cook Islands Cup. He has since took up coaching with the club, providing as the sole staff member in both their U15 and U18 sides. He serves as the club's captain. He is referred to as little man by teammates and fans, referring to his stature, standing at only 168cm tall.

In 2026, he permanently transferred to Tupapa Maraerenga. He made his debut on 17 July 2026, starting against Avatiu at the CIFA Field.

== International career ==
He began his international career representing the Cook Islands U17, making 4 appearances in the 2013 OFC U-17 Championship, most notably featuring in their 7–1 rout over Tonga, which serves as the nation's largest win margin in international football.

He then represented the Cook Islands U20 at the 2016 OFC U-20 Championship, starting in 6 of their 8 games, as the Cook Islands won the preliminary round but finished bottom in the tournament proper.

He earned his senior call-up for the Cook Islands in 2022 FIFA World Cup qualification, remaining as an unused substitute in the match against the Solomon Islands. He gained his second call-up for the 2023 Pacific Games, where he would make his debut, coming on in an 8–0 defeat to later champions, New Caledonia.

== Career statistics ==
=== International ===
Cook Islands
Year	Apps	Goals
2022	0	0
2023	1	0
Total	1	0

Statistics accurate as of match played 27 February 2026

== Honours ==
Puaikura

- Cook Islands Round Cup: 2013, 2016
- Cook Islands Cup: 2016
