= 2022 OFC Champions League =

Tournament details
- Dates: 4 June – 17 August 2022
- Teams: 14 (from 8 associations)

Final positions
- Champions: (New Zealand) Auckland City (10th title)
- Runners-up: (French Polynesia) Vénus

Tournament statistics
- Matches played: 15
- Goals scored: 47 (3.13 per match)
- Attendance: 2,340 (156 per match)
- Top scorer(s): (French Polynesia) Teaonui Tehau (4 goals)

The 2022 OFC Champions League (officially known as OFC Champions League 2022) was the 20st edition of the Oceanian Club Championship, Oceania's premier club football tournament organized by the Oceania Football Confederation (OFC), and the 16th season under the current OFC Champions League name.

In the final, Auckland City defeated Vénus 3–0 for their tenth title. Hienghène Sport, having won the title in 2019, were the title holders (the 2020 and 2021 editions were cancelled due to border closures throughout the Pacific caused by the COVID-19 pandemic and the titles were not awarded) but were eliminated by Vénus in the semi-finals.

== Teams ==
A total of 14 teams from 8 OFC member associations are eligible to enter the competition. Due to the COVID-19 pandemic, the format of the competition was changed, with all teams entering a qualifying stage consisting of a qualifying tournament and national play-offs, in order to keep travel to a minimum:

- The six developed associations (Fiji, New Caledonia, Papua New Guinea, Solomon Islands, Tahiti, Vanuatu) are awarded two berths each in the national play-offs, which are either played in a two-legged format or as a single match in their own country between the two teams from each association, with the six winners advancing to the final tournament.
- As the qualifying stages were cancelled due to travel restrictions and logistic challenges, OFC nominated Nikao Sokattak (Cook Islands) based on previous results.

Teams from developed associations, eligible to enter the national play-offs
Association	Team	Qualifying method
Fiji	Lautoka	2021 Fiji Premier League champions
Fiji	Rewa	2021 Fiji Premier League runners-up
New Caledonia	Hienghène Sport	2021 New Caledonia Super Ligue champions
New Caledonia	Ne Drehu	2021 New Caledonia Super Ligue runners-up
Papua New Guinea	Lae City	2021 Papua New Guinea National Soccer League champions
Papua New Guinea	Hekari United	2021 Papua New Guinea National Soccer League runners-up
Solomon Islands	Central Coast	2021 Solomon Islands S-League champions
Solomon Islands	Solomon Warriors	2021 Solomon Islands S-League runners-up
Tahiti	Pirae	2020–21 Tahiti Ligue 1 champions
Tahiti	Vénus	2020–21 Tahiti Ligue 1 runners-up
Vanuatu	Galaxy	2021 VFF National Super League champions
Vanuatu	RueRue	2021 VFF National Super League runners-up

Teams from developed association, receiving a bye to the group stage
Association	Team	Qualifying method
New Zealand	Auckland City	2020–21 New Zealand Football Championship regular season premiers

Teams from developing association, receiving a bye to the group stage
Association	Team	Qualifying method
Cook Islands	Nikao Sokattak	2021 Cook Islands Round Cup champions

== Schedule ==
On 4 March 2021, the OFC announced that the qualifying stage, which would have been played in Tonga between 16 and 22 October 2021, had been postponed to early 2022 due to the COVID-19 pandemic. On 4 June 2021, the OFC announced that the tournament would be moved from its traditional slot at the beginning of the year to August, and a revised format for the event would be presented at the next OFC Executive Committee meeting. On 8 October 2021, the OFC announced the new format of the competition.

== Qualifying stage ==
=== National playoffs ===
On 13 May 2022, OFC announced that 6 sets of national playoffs would take place to determine which side from those nations would take part in this year's Champions League. New Zealand Football announced that they had nominated Auckland City as their sole participant taking part in the competition.

Team 1	Agg.	Team 2	1st leg	2nd leg
Ne Drehu (New Caledonia)	3–4	(New Caledonia) Hienghène Sport	2–2	1–2
Lautoka (Fiji)	1–5	(Fiji) Rewa	1–1	0–4
RueRue (Vanuatu)	0–5	(Vanuatu) Galaxy	0–0	0–5
Solomon Warriors (Solomon Islands)	3–3 (2–4 p)	(Solomon Islands) Central Coast	1–1	2–2 (a.e.t.)
Lae City (Papua New Guinea)	2–1	(Papua New Guinea) Hekari United		
Pirae (French Polynesia)	0–1 (a.e.t.)	(French Polynesia) Vénus		

4 June 2022
15:00 (UTC+11:00)

Ne Drehu (New Caledonia)	2–2	(New Caledonia) Hienghène Sport
Wamowe 23' (pen.); Hace 71'	Report	Béaruné 88'; Athale 90+4' (pen.)

Stade Yoshida, Koné
Attendance: 308
Referee: Johnny Reboul (New Caledonia)
6 June 2022
15:00 (UTC+11:00)

Hienghène Sport (New Caledonia)	2–1	(New Caledonia) Ne Drehu
B. Kaï 22', 90+2'	Report	Hmaen 25'

Stade Numa-Daly, Nouméa
Attendance: 1,300
Referee: Mederic Lacour (New Caledonia)

Hienghène Sport won 4–3 on aggregate.

14 June 2022
20:00 (UTC−10:00)

Pirae (French Polynesia)	0–1 (a.e.t.)	(French Polynesia) Vénus
	Report	R. Tehau 111'

Stade Pater, Papeete
Attendance: 688
Referee: Teremoana Roihau (Tahiti)

17 June 2022
19:30 (UTC+12:00)

Lautoka (Fiji)	1–1	(Fiji) Rewa
Nalaubu 75'	Report	Matarerega 59'

Churchill Park, Lautoka
Attendance: 1,500
Referee: Neeshil Varman (Fiji)
19 June 2022
15:00 (UTC+12:00)

Rewa (Fiji)	4–0	(Fiji) Lautoka
Matarerega 25', 51'; Worworbu 37'; Nabenia 81'	Report

ANZ Stadium, Suva
Attendance: 800
Referee: Kavitesh Behari (Fiji)

Rewa won 5–1 on aggregate.

18 June 2022
14:00 (UTC+11:00)

RueRue (Vanuatu)	0–0	(Vanuatu) Galaxy
	Report

Luganville Soccer City Stadium, Luganville
Attendance: 3,500
Referee: Arnold Tari (Vanuatu)
25 June 2022
14:00 (UTC+11:00)

Galaxy (Vanuatu)	5–0	(Vanuatu) RueRue
Wilson 45'; Batick 54'; Tangis 73', 84'; Kalo 79' (red card)	Report

Korman Stadium, Port Vila
Attendance: 3,000
Referee: Jarethy George (Vanuatu)

Galaxy won 5–0 on aggregate.

19 June 2022
15:00 (UTC+11:00)

Solomon Warriors (Solomon Islands)	1–1	(Solomon Islands) Central Coast
Alick 36'	Report	Fordney 76'

Lawson Tama Stadium
Attendance: 10,000
Referee: Timothy Niu (Solomon Islands)
25 June 2022
15:00 (UTC+11:00)

Central Coast (Solomon Islands)	2–2 (a.e.t.)	(Solomon Islands) Solomon Warriors
Fafale 86', 120+1'	Report	Molea 2'; Hou 96' (red card)
Penalties
Otainao (penalty scored); Oreinima (penalty scored); Bala (penalty scored); Supa (penalty scored)	4–2	(penalty scored) Gagame; (penalty missed) Alick; (penalty scored) Molea; (penalty missed) Feni

Lawson Tama Stadium
Attendance: 10,000
Referee: Ben Aukwai (Solomon Islands)

3–3 on aggregate. Central Coast won 4–2 on penalties

25 June 2022
15:00 (UTC+10:00)

Lae City (Papua New Guinea)	2–1	(Papua New Guinea) Hekari United
David 87', 90'	Report	Simon 45'

PNG Football Stadium, Port Moresby
Attendance: 2,000
Referee: David Yareboinen (Papua New Guinea)

== Group stage ==
Location of teams of the 2022 OFC Champions League group stage.
Red: Group A; Blue: Group B

The group stage was held in Auckland, New Zealand on 4-11 August 2022. The four teams in each group played each other on a round-robin basis at a centralised venue, Ngahue Reserve, Auckland. The winners and runners-up of each group advanced to the semi-finals of the knockout stage.

All of the qualified teams for the group stage are as follows:

- (New Zealand) Auckland City
- (Cook Islands) Nikao Sokattak
- (Fiji) Rewa
- (New Caledonia) Hienghène Sport
- (French Polynesia) Vénus
- (Vanuatu) Galaxy
- (Solomon Islands) Central Coast
- (Papua New Guinea) Lae City

=== Group A ===
Pos	Team	Pld	W	D	L	GF	GA	GD	Pts	Qualification	VEN	CCO	GAL	LAE
1	(French Polynesia) Vénus	3	2	0	1	4	1	+3	6	Knockout stage	—	—	0–1	1–0
2	(Solomon Islands) Central Coast	3	2	0	1	6	6	0	6	Knockout stage	0–3	—	3–1	—
3	(Vanuatu) Galaxy	3	1	1	1	4	5	−1	4		—	—	—	2–2
4	(Papua New Guinea) Lae City	3	0	1	2	4	6	−2	1		—	2–3	—	—

Source: OFC

=== Group B ===
Pos	Team	Pld	W	D	L	GF	GA	GD	Pts	Qualification	AUC	HIE	REW	NIK
1	(New Zealand) Auckland City (H)	3	3	0	0	12	1	+11	9	Knockout stage	—	5−0	—	—
2	(New Caledonia) Hienghène Sport	3	2	0	1	3	5	−2	6	Knockout stage	—	—	2–0	—
3	(Fiji) Rewa	3	1	0	2	3	6	−3	3		0–3	—	—	3–1
4	(Cook Islands) Nikao Sokattack	3	0	0	3	2	8	−6	0		1–4	0–1	—	—

Source: OFC
(H) Hosts

== Knockout stage ==
The four teams in the knockout stage played on a single-elimination basis, with each tie played as a single match at Ngahue Reserve.

=== Bracket ===
The bracket was determined as follows:

Semi-finals
14 August 2022
(Tahitian Football Federation) Vénus	4
(New Caledonian Football Federation) Hienghène Sport	0
14 August 2022
(New Zealand) Auckland City	2
(Solomon Islands Football Federation) Central Coast	0

Final
17 August 2022
(Tahitian Football Federation) Vénus	0
(New Zealand) Auckland City	3

=== Semi-finals ===
Team 1	Score	Team 2
Vénus (French Polynesia)	4–0	(New Caledonian Football Federation) Hienghène Sport
Auckland City (New Zealand)	2–0	(Solomon Islands) Central Coast

=== Final ===
In the final, the two semi-final winners played each other. It took place on 17 August 2022.

17 August 2022
14:00 UTC+12

Vénus (French Polynesia)	0–3	(New Zealand) Auckland City
	Report	Howieson 13' (pen.); Garriga 29'; Tade 88'

Ngahue Reserve, Auckland
Attendance: 400
Referee: David Yareboinen (Papua New Guinea)

== Statistics ==
Statistics exclude national play-off rounds.

=== Top goalscorers ===
Rank	Player	Team	Goals
1	(French Polynesia) Teaonui Tehau	(French Polynesia) Vénus	4
2	(Solomon Islands) Clifford Fafale	(Solomon Islands) Central Coast	3
2	(Spain) Gerard Garriga	(New Zealand) Auckland City	3
2	(New Zealand) Cameron Howieson	(New Zealand) Auckland City	3
5	(Papua New Guinea) Jonathan Allen	(Papua New Guinea) Lae City	2
5	(Solomon Islands) Junior Fordney	(Solomon Islands) Central Coast	2
5	(New Zealand) Mario Ilich	(New Zealand) Auckland City	2
5	(French Polynesia) Tauhiti Keck	(French Polynesia) Vénus	2
5	(New Zealand) Dylan Manickum	(New Zealand) Auckland City	2
5	(New Zealand) Adam Mitchell	(New Zealand) Auckland City	2
5	(New Caledonia) Fonzy Ranchain	(New Caledonia) Hienghène Sport	2
5	(Argentina) Emiliano Tade	(New Zealand) Auckland City	2
5	(Vanuatu) Kensi Tangis	(Vanuatu) Galaxy	2
5	(Fiji) Abbu Zahid	(Fiji) Rewa	2
15	12 players		1
