= 2022 OFC Champions League knockout stage =

The 2022 OFC Champions League knockout stage will be played from 14 to 17 August 2022. A total of four teams will compete in the knockout stage to decide the champions of the 2022 OFC Champions League.

== Qualified teams ==
The winners and runners-up of each of the two groups in the group stage advanced to the semi-finals.

Group	Winners	Runners-up
A	(French Polynesia) Vénus	(Solomon Islands Football Federation) Central Coast
B	(New Zealand) Auckland City	(New Caledonian Football Federation) Hienghène Sport

== Format ==
The four teams in the knockout stage played on a single-elimination basis, with each tie played as a single match at Ngahue Reserve.

== Schedule ==
The schedule of each round was as follows.

Round	Match dates
Semi-finals	14 August 2022
Final	17 August 2022 at Ngahue Reserve, Auckland

== Bracket ==
The bracket was determined as follows:

Semi-finals
14 August 2022
(Tahitian Football Federation) Vénus	4
(New Caledonian Football Federation) Hienghène Sport	0
14 August 2022
(New Zealand) Auckland City	2
(Solomon Islands Football Federation) Central Coast	0

Final
17 August 2022
(Tahitian Football Federation) Vénus	0
(New Zealand) Auckland City	3

== Semi-finals ==
Team 1	Score	Team 2
Vénus (French Polynesia)	4–0	(New Caledonian Football Federation) Hienghène Sport
Auckland City (New Zealand)	2–0	(Solomon Islands) Central Coast

14 August 2022
11:30 UTC+12

Vénus (French Polynesia)	4–0	(New Caledonian Football Federation) Hienghène Sport
T. Tehau 17'; Keck 24', 79'; R. Tehau 27'	Report

Ngahue Reserve, Auckland
Attendance: 110
Referee: Matthew Conger (New Zealand)

14 August 2022
14:30 UTC+12

Auckland City (New Zealand)	2–0	(Solomon Islands) Central Coast
Mitchell 26'; Manickum 90+5'	Report

Ngahue Reserve, Auckland
Attendance: 350
Referee: Norbert Hauata (Tahiti)

== Final ==
In the final, the two semi-final winners played each other. It took place on 17 August 2022.

17 August 2022
14:00 UTC+12

Vénus (French Polynesia)	0–3	(New Zealand) Auckland City
	Report	Howieson 13' (pen.); Garriga 29'; Tade 88'

Ngahue Reserve, Auckland
Attendance: 400
Referee: David Yareboinen (Papua New Guinea)
