= 2020 FIFA Club World Cup =

2020 edition of the FIFA Club World Cup

FIFA Club World Cup Qatar 2020 presented by Alibaba Cloud كأس العالم للأندية لكرة القدم قطر 2020

Tournament details
- Host country: Qatar
- Dates: 4–11 February 2021
- Teams: 6 (from 5 confederations)
- Venues: 2 (in 1 host city)

Final positions
- Champions: (Germany) Bayern Munich (2nd title)
- Runners-up: (Mexico) Tigres UANL
- Third place: (Egypt) Al Ahly
- Fourth place: (Brazil) Palmeiras

Tournament statistics
- Matches played: 8
- Goals scored: 12 (1.5 per match)
- Attendance: 24,639 (3,080 per match)
- Top scorer: (France) André-Pierre Gignac (3 goals)
- Best player: (Poland) Robert Lewandowski
- Fair play award: (Qatar) Al-Duhail

The 2020 FIFA Club World Cup (officially known as the FIFA Club World Cup Qatar 2020 presented by Alibaba Cloud for sponsorship reasons) was the 17th edition of the FIFA Club World Cup, a FIFA-organised international club football tournament between the winners of the six continental confederations, as well as the host nation's league champions. The tournament was hosted by Qatar.

The event was postponed to 2021 due to the COVID-19 pandemic, as the AFC, CONMEBOL, and CONCACAF champions would not have been decided in time for the tournament. Originally to be held in December 2020, on 17 November of the same year FIFA announced that the competition would be played between 1 and 11 February 2021.

Originally seven teams were to compete in the tournament. However, OFC's representatives Auckland City withdrew due to the COVID-19 pandemic and related quarantine measures required by the New Zealand authorities. As a result, only six teams competed, and the first round match, originally scheduled on 1 February 2021, was awarded as a 3–0 win to their first round opponents, host Qatar's representatives Al-Duhail, who advanced automatically to the second round on 4 February 2021.

Defending champions Liverpool did not qualify as they were eliminated in the round of 16 of the 2019–20 UEFA Champions League. The eventual winners of that competition, Bayern Munich, went on to win the Club World Cup for a second time, beating Al Ahly 2–0 in the semi-finals, before a 1–0 win over Tigres UANL in the final. In winning the title, Bayern Munich became only the second club in European football history (after Barcelona in 2009) to win all six competitions they entered (commonly known as a sextuple) in a single calendar year.

== Host appointment ==
With proposals for an expanded Club World Cup, FIFA delayed the announcement of a host. On 28 May 2019, FIFA announced that the 2019 and 2020 tournament host would be appointed at the FIFA Council meeting in Paris, France, on 3 June 2019.

Qatar was appointed as the host for the 2019 and 2020 tournaments on 3 June 2019, serving as test events ahead of their hosting of the 2022 FIFA World Cup. The tournament retained its original format ahead of the scheduled revamp.

== Qualified teams ==
Location of the teams participating in the 2020 FIFA Club World Cup.

Team	Confederation	Qualification	Qualified date	Participation (bold indicates winners)
Entering in the semi-finals
(Germany) Bayern Munich	UEFA	Winners of the 2019–20 UEFA Champions League	23 August 2020	2nd (Previous: **2013**)
(Brazil) Palmeiras	CONMEBOL	Winners of the 2020 Copa Libertadores	30 January 2021	1st
Entering in the second round
(Egypt) Al Ahly	CAF	Winners of the 2019–20 CAF Champions League	27 November 2020	6th (Previous: 2005, 2006, 2008, 2012, 2013)
(South Korea) Ulsan Hyundai	AFC	Winners of the 2020 AFC Champions League	19 December 2020	2nd (Previous: 2012)
(Mexico) Tigres UANL	CONCACAF	Winners of the 2020 CONCACAF Champions League	22 December 2020	1st
Entering in the first round
(Qatar) Al-Duhail	AFC (host)	Winners of the 2019–20 Qatar Stars League	27 September 2020 (Note: Al-Duhail won the 2019–20 Qatar Stars League on 21 August 2020. Their participation was officially confirmed on 27 September 2020 after Al-Sadd became the last team from Qatar to be eliminated from the 2020 AFC Champions League.)	1st
(New Zealand) ~~Auckland City~~ (withdrew) (Note: On 15 January 2021, FIFA announced that Auckland City had withdrawn from the competition due to the COVID-19 pandemic and related quarantine measures required by the New Zealand authorities.)	OFC	Nominated by OFC (Note: On 4 September 2020, the Oceania Football Confederation announced that the 2020 OFC Champions League was abandoned due to the border and travel restrictions caused by the COVID-19 pandemic, and no champions would be awarded. The OFC representative at the 2020 FIFA Club World Cup, which would have originally been the winners of the 2020 OFC Champions League, was confirmed to be Auckland City on 19 November 2020. The team was chosen by the OFC Executive Committee based on the principles within the competition regulations of the OFC Champions League, which established a ranking of each team after the group stage, where Auckland City were ranked first.)	19 November 2020	10th (planned) (Previous: 2006, 2009, 2011, 2012, 2013, 2014, 2015, 2016, 2017)

== Venues ==
The matches were played in the city of Al Rayyan, at the Ahmad bin Ali Stadium and Education City Stadium; both 40,000-seat venues which would later host matches at the 2022 FIFA World Cup. Due to the COVID-19 pandemic in Qatar, attendance was limited to only 30% of the stadiums' seating capacity. A third stadium in Al Rayyan, Khalifa International Stadium, would originally have hosted two matches, but following the withdrawal of Auckland City and the subsequent revision of the match schedule, it was not used for the tournament.

Al Rayyan (Doha Area)		Location of the host city of the 2020 FIFA Club World Cup.
Ahmad bin Ali Stadium	Education City Stadium	Location of the host city of the 2020 FIFA Club World Cup.
Capacity: 45,032	Capacity: 44,667	Location of the host city of the 2020 FIFA Club World Cup.

== Match officials ==
Seven referees, twelve assistant referees, and seven video assistant referees were appointed for the tournament. Brazilian referee Edina Alves Batista became the first woman to officiate at a senior FIFA men's tournament.

Confederation	Referees	Assistant referees	Video assistant referees
AFC	(United Arab Emirates) Mohammed Abdulla Hassan Mohamed	(United Arab Emirates) Mohamed Al Hammadi; (United Arab Emirates) Hasan Al Mahri	(Qatar) Khamis Al-Marri
CAF	(Senegal) Maguette Ndiaye	(Senegal) Djibril Camara; (Senegal) El Hadji Malick Samba	(Morocco) Rédouane Jiyed
CONCACAF	(Guatemala) Mario Escobar	(Jamaica) Nicholas Anderson; (Guatemala) Humberto Panjoj	(Canada) Drew Fischer
CONMEBOL	(Brazil) Edina Alves Batista	(Brazil) Neuza Back; (Argentina) Mariana de Almeida	(Chile) Julio Bascuñán; (Colombia) Nicolás Gallo
CONMEBOL	(Uruguay) Esteban Ostojich (Note: Uruguayan referee Leodán González was replaced by Esteban Ostojich for health reasons.)	(Uruguay) Nicolás Taran; (Uruguay) Richard Trinidad	(Chile) Julio Bascuñán; (Colombia) Nicolás Gallo
OFC	(French Polynesia) Abdelkader Zitouni		
UEFA	(Netherlands) Danny Makkelie	(Netherlands) Mario Diks; (Netherlands) Hessel Steegstra	(Netherlands) Kevin Blom; (Netherlands) Jochem Kamphuis

== Squads ==
Each team had to name a 23-man squad (three of whom must be goalkeepers). Injury replacements were allowed until 24 hours before the team's first match.

== Matches ==
The match schedule was announced on 23 December 2020, with a revised schedule with change of venues announced on 18 January 2021. The draw of the tournament was held on 19 January 2021, 16:00 CET (UTC+1), at the FIFA headquarters in Zürich, Switzerland, to decide the matchups of the second round (between the first round winner and teams from AFC, CAF and CONCACAF), and the opponents of the two second round winners in the semi-finals (against teams from CONMEBOL and UEFA). At the time of the draw, the identity of the CONMEBOL team was not known.

If a match was tied after normal playing time:

- For elimination matches, extra time was played. If still tied after extra time, a penalty shoot-out was held to determine the winner.
- For the matches for fifth place and third place, no extra time was played, and a penalty shoot-out was held to determine the winner.

First round
1 February – Al Rayyan (ABAS)
(Qatar) Al-Duhail (awd.) (Note: The Al-Duhail v Auckland City match was awarded as a 3–0 win to Al-Duhail after Auckland City withdrew due to the COVID-19 pandemic and related quarantine measures required by the New Zealand authorities.)	3
(New Zealand) Auckland City	0

Second round
4 February – Al Rayyan (ECS)
(Qatar) Al-Duhail	0
(Egypt) Al Ahly	1
4 February – Al Rayyan (ABAS)
(Mexico) Tigres UANL	2
(South Korea) Ulsan Hyundai	1

Semi-finals
8 February – Al Rayyan (ABAS)
(Egypt) Al Ahly	0
(Germany) Bayern Munich	2
7 February – Al Rayyan (ECS)
(Brazil) Palmeiras	0
(Mexico) Tigres UANL	1
Match for fifth place
7 February – Al Rayyan (ABAS)
(South Korea) Ulsan Hyundai	1
(Qatar) Al-Duhail	3

Final
11 February – Al Rayyan (ECS)
(Germany) Bayern Munich	1
(Mexico) Tigres UANL	0
Match for third place
11 February – Al Rayyan (ECS)
(Egypt) Al Ahly (p)	0 (3)
(Brazil) Palmeiras	0 (2)

All times are listed in AST (UTC+3).

=== First round ===
1 February 2021
20:30

Al-Duhail (Qatar)	3–0 Awarded	(New Zealand) Auckland City
	Report

Ahmad bin Ali Stadium, Al Rayyan

=== Second round ===
4 February 2021
17:00

Tigres UANL (Mexico)	2–1	(South Korea) Ulsan Hyundai
Gignac 38', 45+5' (pen.)	Report	Kim Kee-hee 24'

Ahmad bin Ali Stadium, Al Rayyan
Attendance: 866
Referee: Esteban Ostojich (Uruguay)

4 February 2021
20:30

Al-Duhail (Qatar)	0–1	(Egypt) Al Ahly
	Report	El Shahat 30'

Education City Stadium, Al Rayyan
Referee: Mario Escobar (Guatemala)

=== Match for fifth place ===
7 February 2021
18:00

Ulsan Hyundai (South Korea)	1–3	(Qatar) Al-Duhail
Yoon Bit-garam 62'	Report	Edmilson 21'; Muntari 66'; Ali 82'

Ahmad bin Ali Stadium, Al Rayyan
Attendance: 920
Referee: Edina Alves Batista (Brazil)

=== Semi-finals ===
7 February 2021
21:00

Palmeiras (Brazil)	0–1	(Mexico) Tigres UANL
	Report	Gignac 54' (pen.)

Education City Stadium, Al Rayyan
Attendance: 1,854
Referee: Danny Makkelie (Netherlands)

8 February 2021
21:00

Al Ahly (Egypt)	0–2	(Germany) Bayern Munich
	Report	Lewandowski 17', 86'

Ahmad bin Ali Stadium, Al Rayyan
Attendance: 7,982
Referee: Mohammed Abdulla Hassan Mohamed (United Arab Emirates)

=== Match for third place ===
11 February 2021
18:00

Al Ahly (Egypt)	0–0	(Brazil) Palmeiras
	Report
Penalties
Benoun (penalty scored); El Solia (penalty missed); M. Mohsen (penalty missed); Hany (penalty scored); Ajayi (penalty scored)	3–2	(penalty missed) Rony; (penalty missed) Luiz Adriano; (penalty scored) Gustavo Scarpa; (penalty scored) Gómez; (penalty missed) Felipe Melo

Education City Stadium, Al Rayyan
Attendance: 5,606
Referee: Maguette Ndiaye (Senegal)

=== Final ===
11 February 2021
21:00

Bayern Munich (Germany)	1–0	(Mexico) Tigres UANL
Pavard 59'	Report

Education City Stadium, Al Rayyan
Attendance: 7,411
Referee: Esteban Ostojich (Uruguay)

== Goalscorers ==
Rank	Player	Team	Goals
1	(France) André-Pierre Gignac	(Mexico) Tigres UANL	3
2	(Poland) Robert Lewandowski	(Germany) Bayern Munich	2
3	(Qatar) Almoez Ali	(Qatar) Al-Duhail	1
3	(Belgium) Edmilson	(Qatar) Al-Duhail	1
3	(Egypt) Hussein El Shahat	(Egypt) Al Ahly	1
3	(South Korea) Kim Kee-hee	(South Korea) Ulsan Hyundai	1
3	(Qatar) Mohammed Muntari	(Qatar) Al-Duhail	1
3	(France) Benjamin Pavard	(Germany) Bayern Munich	1
3	(South Korea) Yoon Bit-garam	(South Korea) Ulsan Hyundai	1

== Final ranking ==
Per statistical convention in football, matches decided in extra time were counted as wins and losses, while matches decided by penalty shoot-out were counted as draws.

Pos	Team	Pld	W	D	L	GF	GA	GD	Pts
1st place, gold medalist(s)	(Germany) Bayern Munich (UEFA)	2	2	0	0	3	0	+3	6
2nd place, silver medalist(s)	(Mexico) Tigres UANL (CONCACAF)	3	2	0	1	3	2	+1	6
3rd place, bronze medalist(s)	(Egypt) Al Ahly (CAF)	3	1	1	1	1	2	−1	4
4	(Brazil) Palmeiras (CONMEBOL)	2	0	1	1	0	1	−1	1
5	(Qatar) Al-Duhail (AFC) (H)	2	1	0	1	3	2	+1	3
6	(South Korea) Ulsan Hyundai (AFC)	2	0	0	2	2	5	−3	0

Source: FIFA
(H) Hosts

== Awards ==
The following awards were given at the conclusion of the tournament. Robert Lewandowski of Bayern Munich won the Golden Ball award, sponsored by Adidas, which is jointly awarded with the Alibaba Cloud Award to recognise the player of the tournament.

Adidas Golden Ball Alibaba Cloud Award	Adidas Silver Ball	Adidas Bronze Ball
(Poland) Robert Lewandowski (Bayern Munich)	(France) André-Pierre Gignac (Tigres UANL)	(Germany) Joshua Kimmich (Bayern Munich)
FIFA Fair Play Award
(Qatar) Al-Duhail

FIFA also named a man of the match for the best player in each game at the tournament.

Alibaba Cloud Match Award
Match	Man of the match	Club	Opponent
2	(France) André-Pierre Gignac	(Mexico) Tigres UANL	(South Korea) Ulsan Hyundai
3	(Egypt) Ayman Ashraf	(Egypt) Al Ahly	(Qatar) Al-Duhail
4	(Belgium) Edmilson	(Qatar) Al-Duhail	(South Korea) Ulsan Hyundai
5	(Colombia) Luis Quiñones	(Mexico) Tigres UANL	(Brazil) Palmeiras
6	(Poland) Robert Lewandowski	(Germany) Bayern Munich	(Egypt) Al Ahly
7	(Egypt) Mohamed El Shenawy	(Egypt) Al Ahly	(Brazil) Palmeiras
8	(Germany) Joshua Kimmich	(Germany) Bayern Munich	(Mexico) Tigres UANL
