= 2022 OFC Champions League group stage =

The 2022 OFC Champions League group stage was played from 4 to 11 August 2022. A total of 8 teams competed in the group stage to decide the four places in the knockout stage of the 2022 OFC Champions League.

== Draw ==
The draw of the group stage were announced by the OFC on 30 June 2022. The 8 teams were drawn into two groups of four.

National playoff winners	Nominated
(Fiji) Rewa; (New Caledonia) Hienghène Sport; (French Polynesia) Vénus; (Vanuatu) Galaxy; (Solomon Islands) Central Coast; (Papua New Guinea) Lae City	(New Zealand) Auckland City; (Cook Islands) Nikao Sokattak

== Format ==
The four teams in each group played each other on a round-robin basis at a centralised venue, Ngahue Reserve, Auckland. The winners and runners-up of each group advanced to the semi-finals of the knockout stage.

== Schedule ==
Matches were played on the following dates and venues:

- Group matches were played between 4–11 August 2022 in New Zealand.

The schedule of each matchday was as follows.

Matchday	Dates		Matches
Matchday	Group A	Group B	Matches
Matchday 1	4 August 2022	5 August 2022	Team 2 vs. Team 3, Team 4 vs. Team 1
Matchday 2	7 August 2022	8 August 2022	Team 4 vs. Team 2, Team 1 vs. Team 3
Matchday 3	10 August 2022	11 August 2022	Team 3 vs. Team 4, Team 1 vs. Team 2

== Groups ==
=== Group A ===
All times were local, NZT (UTC+12).

Pos	Team	Pld	W	D	L	GF	GA	GD	Pts	Qualification	VEN	CCO	GAL	LAE
1	(French Polynesia) Vénus	3	2	0	1	4	1	+3	6	Knockout stage	—	—	0–1	1–0
2	(Solomon Islands) Central Coast	3	2	0	1	6	6	0	6	Knockout stage	0–3	—	3–1	—
3	(Vanuatu) Galaxy	3	1	1	1	4	5	−1	4		—	—	—	2–2
4	(Papua New Guinea) Lae City	3	0	1	2	4	6	−2	1		—	2–3	—	—

Source: OFC
4 August 2022
12:00

Galaxy (Vanuatu)	2–2	(Papua New Guinea) Lae City
F. Komolong 28' (o.g.); Tangis 46'	Report (OFC)	Kileteir 34' (o.g.); Allen 75'

Ngahue Reserve, Auckland
Attendance: 100
Referee: Campbell-Kirk Kawana-Waugh (New Zealand)
4 August 2022
15:00

Central Coast (Solomon Islands)	0–3	(French Polynesia) Vénus
	Report (OFC)	T. Tehau 12', 17' (pen.), 46'

Ngahue Reserve, Auckland
Attendance: 100
Referee: Mederic Lacour (New Caledonia)

7 August 2022
12:00

Central Coast (Solomon Islands)	3–1	(Vanuatu) Galaxy
Bule 36'; Fordney 45'; Fafale 56'	Report (OFC)	Tangis 13'

Ngahue Reserve, Auckland
Attendance: 100
Referee: Veer Singh (Fiji)
7 August 2022
15:00

Vénus (French Polynesia)	1–0	(Papua New Guinea) Lae City
Barbe 80'	Report (OFC)

Ngahue Reserve, Auckland
Attendance: 150
Referee: Matthew Conger (New Zealand)

10 August 2022
12:00

Lae City (Papua New Guinea)	2–3	(Solomon Islands) Central Coast
David 41'; Allen 76'	Report (OFC)	Fordney 12'; Fafale 21', 42'

Ngahue Reserve, Auckland
Attendance: 100
Referee: Matthew Conger (New Zealand)
10 August 2022
15:00

Vénus (French Polynesia)	0–1	(Vanuatu) Galaxy
	Report (OFC)	Kalo 54'

Ngahue Reserve, Auckland
Attendance: 100
Referee: Campbell-Kirk Kawana-Waugh (New Zealand)

=== Group B ===
All times were local, NZT (UTC+12).

Pos	Team	Pld	W	D	L	GF	GA	GD	Pts	Qualification	AUC	HIE	REW	NIK
1	(New Zealand) Auckland City (H)	3	3	0	0	12	1	+11	9	Knockout stage	—	5−0	—	—
2	(New Caledonia) Hienghène Sport	3	2	0	1	3	5	−2	6	Knockout stage	—	—	2–0	—
3	(Fiji) Rewa	3	1	0	2	3	6	−3	3		0–3	—	—	3–1
4	(Cook Islands) Nikao Sokattack	3	0	0	3	2	8	−6	0		1–4	0–1	—	—

Source: OFC
(H) Hosts
5 August 2022
12:00

Auckland City (New Zealand)	5−0	(New Caledonia) Hienghène Sport
Mitchell 8'; Howieson 14'; Manickum 38'; Ilich 48'; Gillion 88'	Report (OFC)

Ngahue Reserve, Auckland
Attendance: 120
Referee: Norbert Hauata (Tahiti)
5 August 2022
15:00

Rewa (Fiji)	3–1	(Cook Islands) Nikao Sokattack
Zahid 2', 56'; Waranaivalu 45+3'	Report (OFC)	Leito 78'

Ngahue Reserve, Auckland
Attendance: 200
Referee: David Yareboinen (Papua New Guinea)

8 August 2022
12:00

Rewa (Fiji)	0–3	(New Zealand) Auckland City
	Report (OFC)	Howieson 26' (pen.); Ilich 35'; Tade 90+4'

Ngahue Reserve, Auckland
Attendance: 150
Referee: Ben Aukwai (Solomon Islands)
8 August 2022
15:00

Nikao Sokattack (Cook Islands)	0–1	(New Caledonia) Hienghène Sport
	Report (OFC)	Ranchain 58'

Ngahue Reserve, Auckland
Attendance: 100
Referee: Teremoana Roihau (Tahiti)

11 August 2022
12:00

Hienghène Sport (New Caledonia)	2–0	(Fiji) Rewa
Ranchain 64'; Athale 74'	Report (OFC)

Ngahue Reserve, Auckland
Attendance: 120
Referee: Norbert Hauata (Tahiti)
11 August 2022
15:00

Nikao Sokattack (Cook Islands)	1–4	(New Zealand) Auckland City
Willis 39'	Report (OFC)	Garriga 40', 50'; Lee 55'; Ellis 65'

Ngahue Reserve, Auckland
Attendance: 140
Referee: David Yareboinen (Papua New Guinea)
