= 2018 New Caledonia Super Ligue =

New Caledonia Super Ligue
- Season: 2018
- Champions: Magenta
- OFC Champions League: Magenta; Hienghène Sport

The New Caledonia Super Ligue 2018 is the 45th season of top-tier Caledonian football. It was originally scheduled to start on 31 March 2018, but was postponed to 7 April 2018. Twelve teams take part in the championship.

== Standings ==
Note: 4 points for a win, 2 points for a draw, 1 point for a defeat.

| Pos | Team | Pld | W | D | L | GF | GA | GD | Pts | Qualification or relegation |
|---|---|---|---|---|---|---|---|---|---|---|
| 1 | Magenta (C) | 22 | 17 | 4 | 1 | 63 | 27 | +36 | 77 | Qualification to 2020 OFC Champions League group stage |
| 2 | Hienghène Sport | 22 | 15 | 1 | 6 | 56 | 29 | +27 | 64 (Note: Point deductions for failure to supply referees and assistant referees: Hienghène Sport: 3 pts; AGJP, Lössi, Thio Sport, Tiga Sports, Trio Kedeigne, Wetr: 6 pts; Horizon Patho, Racing de Poindimié: 9 pts; Other point deductions: Hienghène Sport deducted 1 point for using ineligible player; AGJP deducted 1 point for forfeit) | Qualification to 2020 OFC Champions League group stage |
| 3 | Mont-Dore | 22 | 12 | 5 | 5 | 31 | 24 | +7 | 63 | |
| 4 | Ne Drehu | 22 | 11 | 6 | 5 | 45 | 28 | +17 | 61 | |
| 5 | Tiga Sports | 22 | 14 | 1 | 7 | 52 | 29 | +23 | 59 | |
| 6 | Lössi | 22 | 10 | 7 | 5 | 48 | 30 | +18 | 53 | |
| 7 | Trio Kedeigne | 22 | 7 | 3 | 12 | 33 | 44 | −11 | 40 | |
| 8 | Wetr | 22 | 7 | 2 | 13 | 32 | 34 | −2 | 39 | |
| 9 | Horizon Patho | 22 | 6 | 6 | 10 | 40 | 32 | +8 | 37 | Promotion/relegation playoff |
| 10 | Thio Sport | 22 | 5 | 4 | 13 | 23 | 50 | −27 | 35 | Relegation to 2019 Promotion d'Honneur |
| 11 | Racing de Poindimié | 22 | 5 | 3 | 14 | 44 | 71 | −27 | 31 | Relegation to 2019 Promotion d'Honneur |
| 12 | AGJP (R) | 22 | 1 | 2 | 19 | 24 | 93 | −69 | 20 | Relegation to 2019 Promotion d'Honneur |

Source: FIFA
(C) Champions; (R) Relegated

== See also ==
- 2018 New Caledonia Cup
