= Jon Mitchell (journalist) =

Welsh journalist and author

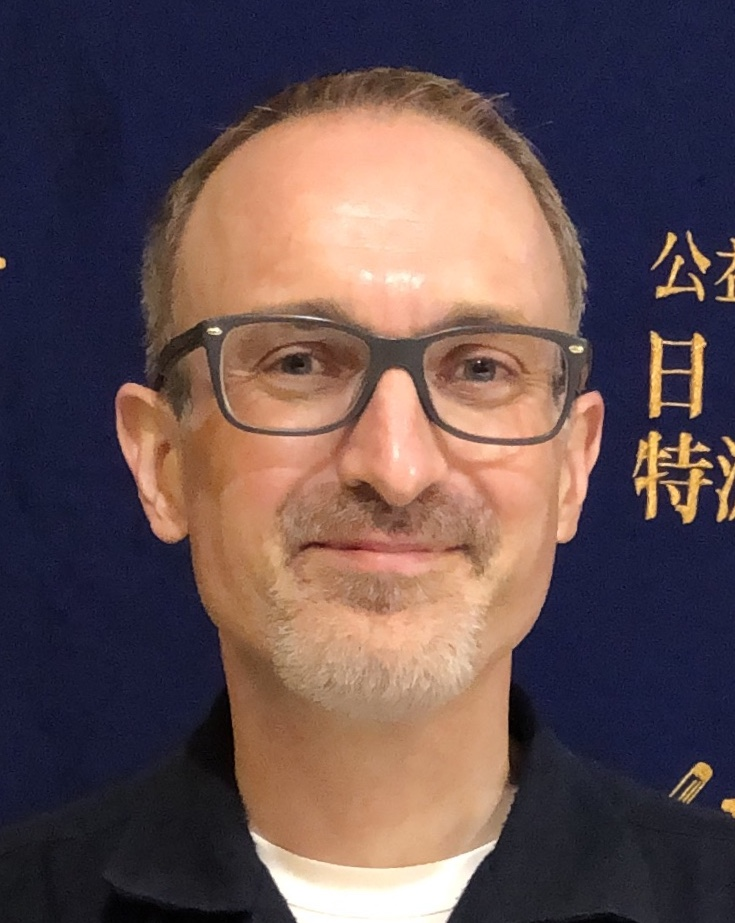
Jon Mitchell at Foreign Correspondents' Club of Japan, June 2021.

Jon Mitchell is a Welsh journalist and author residing in Yokohama, Japan. Mitchell has written widely about Okinawa, especially on issues created by the ongoing presence of the United States Armed Forces. He was awarded the inaugural Foreign Correspondents' Club of Japan's Freedom of the Press Lifetime Achievement Award for this work in 2015. In 2021, Mitchell's book, Poisoning the Pacific: The US Military's Secret Dumping of Plutonium, Chemical Weapons, and Agent Orange, won Second Place in the Society of Environmental Journalists annual awards for Reporting on the Environment.

== Work ==
Mitchell is a visiting researcher at the International Peace Research Institute of Meiji Gakuin University. He is a regular contributor for The Japan Times and an associate and contributing editor to The Asia-Pacific Journal: Japan Focus. He is a special correspondent for the Okinawa Times. Investigative journalism and human interest stories on environmental contamination and the impact of military herbicides such as Agent Orange on Okinawa are frequent subjects of his writing. He is the author of three Japanese language books about US military contamination: Tsuiseki: Okinawa no Karehazai (Chasing Agent Orange on Okinawa) (Koubunken, 2014), Tsuiseki: Nichibeichiikyoutei to Kichikougai (Military Contamination and the U.S.-Japan Status of Forces Agreement) (Iwanami Shoten, 2018) and Eien no Kagakubusshitsu: Mizu no PFAS Osen (Forever Chemicals: How PFAS Poisons Japan and the World) (Iwanami Shoten, 2020). In 2020, Rowman & Littlefield published Mitchell's Poisoning the Pacific: The US Military's Secret Dumping of Plutonium, Chemical Weapons, and Agent Orange.

In April 2019, Okinawa International University, Ginowan City, opened the Jon Mitchell Collection to the public, consisting of more than 5500 pages of Department of Defense and CIA documents related to Okinawa. Mitchell has also donated FOIA-obtained documents to libraries at University of Hawaiʻi at Mānoa and George Washington University.

In 2022, Mitchell co-directed a 72-minute documentary titled “Nuchi nu Miji – Okinawa’s Water of Life” for Okinawa TV station, Ryukyu Asahi Broadcasting. The documentary depicted how US military per- and polyfluoroalkyl substances had contaminated the drinking water sources in Okinawa Prefecture. In March 2023, Harvard University’s Edwin O. Reischauer Institute of Japanese Studies brought Mitchell to screen the documentary at the Association for Asian Studies Annual Conference in Boston.

In 2026, Mitchell's Why are We in Okinawa? A History of Violence (Bloomsbury Publishing) was launched at SOAS, University of London.

== Awards and recognition ==
- The British media nicknamed him the "Bard of a Broken Country" for the poems he wrote after the 2011 Tōhoku earthquake and tsunami. The poems were gathered in a booklet called March and After and sold to support survivors of the disaster.
- Defoliated Island, a TV documentary about Mitchell's investigation into the contamination from the alleged usage of military herbicides in Japan, was winner of a 2012 award for excellence from the National Association of Commercial Broadcasters in Japan.
- Freedom of the Press Lifetime Achievement Award from the Foreign Correspondents' Club of Japan (2015)
- Society of Environmental Journalists Rachel Carson Environmental Book Award – Second place (2021)
- In November 2022, Mitchell's co-directed documentary, “Nuchi nu Miji – Okinawa’s Water of Life”, received an Honorary Mention in the annual Galaxy Awards selected by Japan's Association of Broadcast Critics.
- Japan Congress of Journalists awarded "Nuchi nu Miji - Okinawa's Water of Life" an award for excellence in September 2023.
- Society of Environmental Journalists Outstanding Beat Reporting (Large Newsroom) – Third place (2023).
- Waseda University Ishibashi Tanzan Journalism Grand Prize for public service (2023)
