= 2018 Coupe de Calédonie =

Tournament details
- Country: New Caledonia

Final positions
- Champions: AS Magenta (11th title)
- Runners-up: Hienghène Sport

The 2018 Coupe de Calédonie (also known as New Caledonia Cup) was the 63rd edition of the national cup in New Caledonian football. AS Magenta won the title beating Hienghène Sport in the final, earning the right to represent New Caledonia in the 2018–19 Coupe de France, entering the seventh round.

== Round of 16 ==
Competed by 12 teams of the 2018 New Caledonia Super Ligue and four teams which qualified from provincial competitions (one from Islands, one from North, two from South).

Team 1	Score	Team 2
4 August 2018
AGJP	0-7	Hienghène Sport
AS Magenta	2-2 (aet) (2-0 pen)	Thio Sport
ES Wacaele	6-2 (aet)	AS Kunie
AS Horizon Patho	1-3	Tiga Sports
Trio Kedeigne	3-3 (aet) (3-4 pen)	SC Ne Drehu
ASC Ponerihouen	1-3	AS Lössi
5 August 2018
CA Saint-Louis	5-2	RC Poindimié
AS Mont-Dore	2-1	AS Wetr

== Quarter-finals ==
Team 1	Score	Team 2
1 September 2018
Tiga Sports	3-4	Hienghène Sport
CA Saint-Louis	0-3	AS Mont-Dore
ES Wacaele	0-1	AS Magenta
2 September 2018
AS Lössi	1-3	SC Ne Drehu

== Semi-finals ==
Team 1	Score	Team 2
6 October 2018 (Stade Numa-Daly, Nouméa)
AS Mont-Dore	2-3	Hienghène Sport
AS Magenta	2-1	SC Ne Drehu

== Final ==
Team 1	Score	Team 2
13 October 2018 (Stade Numa-Daly, Nouméa)
AS Magenta	1-0	Hienghène Sport

== See also ==
- 2018 New Caledonia Super Ligue
