= 2020 OFC Champions League qualifying stage =

The 2020 OFC Champions League qualifying stage was played from 25 to 31 January 2020. A total of four teams competed in the qualifying stage to decide two of the 16 places in the group stage of the 2020 OFC Champions League.

== Draw ==
The draw and the hosts of the qualifying stage were announced by the OFC on 13 December 2019. The champions of the four developing associations were drawn to positions 1 to 4 determine the fixtures.

Teams
- (American Samoa) Pago Youth
- (Cook Islands) Tupapa Maraerenga
- (Samoa) Lupe o le Soaga
- (Tonga) Veitongo

== Format ==
The four teams in the qualifying stage played each other on a round-robin basis at a centralised venue. The winners and runners-up advanced to the group stage to join the 14 direct entrants. According to the group stage draw:

- The qualifying stage winners advanced to Group D.
- The qualifying stage runners-up advanced to Group C.

== Schedule ==
On 17 December 2019, the OFC announced that Pago Youth had withdrawn from the qualifying stage due to concerns about the measles outbreak in the Pacific. Matches were played between 25–31 January 2020 in New Zealand. The schedule of each matchday was as follows.

Matchday	Dates	Matches
Matchday 1	25 January 2020	Team 2 vs. Team 3, Team 4 vs. Team 1
Matchday 2	28 January 2020	Team 4 vs. Team 2, Team 1 vs. Team 3
Matchday 3	31 January 2020	Team 3 vs. Team 4, Team 1 vs. Team 2

== Matches ==
All times were local, NZDT (UTC+13).

Pos	Team	Pld	W	D	L	GF	GA	GD	Pts	Qualification	LUP	TUP	VEI	PAG
1	(Samoa) Lupe o le Soaga	2	1	1	0	2	0	+2	4	Group stage	—	—	2–0	—
2	(Cook Islands) Tupapa Maraerenga	2	0	2	0	2	2	0	2	Group stage	0–0	—	—	—
3	(Tonga) Veitongo	2	0	1	1	2	4	−2	1		—	2–2	—	—
4	(American Samoa) Pago Youth	0	0	0	0	0	0	0	0	Withdrew	—	—	—	—

Source: OFC
25 January 2020
16:00

Lupe o le Soaga (Samoa)	2–0	(Tonga) Veitongo
Chant 27'; Ataga 31'	Report

Ngahue Reserve, Auckland
Attendance: 300
Referee: Calvin Berg (New Zealand)

28 January 2020
16:00

Tupapa Maraerenga (Cook Islands)	0–0	(Samoa) Lupe o le Soaga
	Report

Ngahue Reserve, Auckland
Attendance: 250
Referee: Kavitesh Behari (Fiji)

31 January 2020
16:00

Veitongo (Tonga)	2–2	(Cook Islands) Tupapa Maraerenga
Polovili 2', 33'	Report	Estay 10'; Simiona 50'

Ngahue Reserve, Auckland
Attendance: 250
Referee: Teremoana Roihau (Tahiti)
