= 2020 OFC Champions League group stage =

The 2020 OFC Champions League group stage was played from 15 February to 7 March 2020. A total of 16 teams competed in the group stage to decide the eight places in the knockout stage of the 2020 OFC Champions League.

== Draw ==
The draw and the hosts of the qualifying stage were announced by the OFC on 13 December 2019. The 16 teams (14 teams entering the group stage and two teams advancing from the qualifying stage) were drawn into four groups of four.

- The champions of the seven developed associations, and the runners-up of New Caledonia, by virtue of having the best second team in the 2019 OFC Champions League, were drawn into Positions 1 and 2 of Groups A–D.
- The runners-up of the six developed associations apart from New Caledonia were drawn into Position 3 of Groups A–D and Position 4 of Groups A–B. Teams from the same association could not be drawn into the same group.
- The winners and runners-up of the qualifying stage, whose identity was not known at the time of the draw, were drawn into Position 4 of Groups C–D.

Association champions & New Caledonia runners-up	Remaining runners-up	Teams advancing from qualifying stage
(Fiji) Ba; (New Caledonia) Magenta; (New Zealand) Eastern Suburbs; (Papua New Guinea) Lae City; (Solomon Islands) Solomon Warriors (Note: The identity of both teams from Solomon Islands was not known at the time of the draw.); (French Polynesia) Vénus; (Vanuatu) Malampa Revivors; (New Caledonia) Hienghène Sport	(Fiji) Lautoka; (New Zealand) Auckland City; (Papua New Guinea) Hekari United; (Solomon Islands) Henderson Eels; (French Polynesia) Tiare Tahiti; (Vanuatu) Galaxy	(Samoa) Lupe o le Soaga (Qualifying stage winners); (Cook Islands) Tupapa Maraerenga (Qualifying stage runners-up)

== Format ==
The four teams in each group played each other on a round-robin basis at a centralised venue. The winners and runners-up of each group advanced to the quarter-finals of the knockout stage.

== Schedule ==
Matches were played on the following dates and venues:

- Group A matches were played between 16–22 February 2020 in Papua New Guinea.
- Group B matches were played between 15–21 February 2020 in Vanuatu.
- Group C matches were played between 1–7 March 2020 in New Caledonia.
- Group D matches were played between 1–7 March 2020 in Tahiti.

The schedule of each matchday was as follows.

Matchday	Dates			Matches
Matchday	Group A	Group B	Groups C & D	Matches
Matchday 1	16 February 2020	15 February 2020	1 March 2020	Team 2 vs. Team 3, Team 4 vs. Team 1
Matchday 2	19 February 2020	18 February 2020	4 March 2020	Team 4 vs. Team 2, Team 1 vs. Team 3
Matchday 3	22 February 2020	21 February 2020	7 March 2020	Team 3 vs. Team 4, Team 1 vs. Team 2

== Groups ==
=== Group A ===
All times were local, PGT (UTC+10).

Pos	Team	Pld	W	D	L	GF	GA	GD	Pts	Qualification	EAS	GAL	HEK	HIE
1	(New Zealand) Eastern Suburbs	3	2	1	0	8	3	+5	7	Knockout stage	—	—	2–1	—
2	(Vanuatu) Galaxy	3	1	1	1	7	5	+2	4	Knockout stage	2–2	—	—	4–1
3	(Papua New Guinea) Hekari United (H)	3	1	1	1	5	5	0	4		—	2–1	—	—
4	(New Caledonia) Hienghène Sport	3	0	1	2	3	10	−7	1		0–4	—	2–2	—

Source: OFC
(H) Hosts
16 February 2020
12:00

Galaxy (Vanuatu)	4–1	(New Caledonia) Hienghène Sport
Roberson 14'; Feni 34'; Carter 80'; Tangis 90+1'	Report	Athale 85' (pen.)

Sir John Guise Stadium, Port Moresby
Attendance: 1,000
Referee: Ben Aukwai (Solomon Islands)
16 February 2020
15:00

Eastern Suburbs (New Zealand)	2–1	(Papua New Guinea) Hekari United
Bueno 19', 45+2'	Report	K. Kepo 44'

Sir John Guise Stadium, Port Moresby
Attendance: 1,500
Referee: Veer Singh (Fiji)

19 February 2020
12:00

Galaxy (Vanuatu)	2–2	(New Zealand) Eastern Suburbs
Carter 16'; Roberson 21'	Report	Bueno 43' (pen.), 90+2'

Sir John Guise Stadium, Port Moresby
Attendance: 100
Referee: Timothy Niu (Solomon Islands)
19 February 2020
15:00

Hienghène Sport (New Caledonia)	2–2	(Papua New Guinea) Hekari United
Kayara 5'; Athale 83' (pen.)	Report	Erick Joe 30'; Vinicius Reis 45+7' (pen.)

Sir John Guise Stadium, Port Moresby
Attendance: 500
Referee: Deepak Raj (Fiji)

22 February 2020
12:00

Hienghène Sport (New Caledonia)	0–4	(New Zealand) Eastern Suburbs
	Report	Bueno 11', 72'; Drake 17'; Thurston 90+5'

Sir John Guise Stadium, Port Moresby
Attendance: 300
Referee: Ben Aukwai (Solomon Islands)
22 February 2020
15:00

Hekari United (Papua New Guinea)	2–1	(Vanuatu) Galaxy
A. Kepo 54', 64'	Report	Kalo 84'

Sir John Guise Stadium, Port Moresby
Attendance: 2,000
Referee: Veer Singh (Fiji)

=== Group B ===
All times were local, VUT (UTC+11).

Pos	Team	Pld	W	D	L	GF	GA	GD	Pts	Qualification	MAL	HEN	LAE	LAU
1	(Vanuatu) Malampa Revivors (H)	3	1	2	0	6	3	+3	5	Knockout stage	—	2–2	3–0	—
2	(Solomon Islands) Henderson Eels	3	1	2	0	8	7	+1	5	Knockout stage	—	—	—	3–2
3	(Papua New Guinea) Lae City	3	1	1	1	10	6	+4	4		—	3–3	—	—
4	(Fiji) Lautoka	3	0	1	2	3	11	−8	1		1–1	—	0–7	—

Source: OFC
(H) Hosts
15 February 2020
11:00

Lae City (Papua New Guinea)	3–3	(Solomon Islands) Henderson Eels
Simon 3', 62' (pen.); Dabinyaba 64'	Report	Tanito 24' (pen.), 70' (pen.); Lea'i 36'

Luganville Soccer Stadium, Luganville
Attendance: 2,500
Referee: Norbert Hauata (Tahiti)
15 February 2020
15:00

Lautoka (Fiji)	1–1	(Vanuatu) Malampa Revivors
Caunter 29' (pen.)	Report	Soromon 16'

Luganville Soccer Stadium, Luganville
Attendance: 3,500
Referee: Campbell-Kirk Waugh (New Zealand)

18 February 2020
11:00

Lautoka (Fiji)	0–7	(Papua New Guinea) Lae City
	Report	Dabinyaba 23', 62'; Gunemba 37', 57'; Simon 39', 44'; Bika 45+2'

Luganville Soccer Stadium, Luganville
Attendance: 1,200
Referee: Sione Mau (American Samoa)
18 February 2020
15:00

Malampa Revivors (Vanuatu)	2–2	(Solomon Islands) Henderson Eels
Bai 5'; Ravo 86'	Report	Nawo 42', 80'

Luganville Soccer Stadium, Luganville
Attendance: 2,800
Referee: Antony Riley (New Zealand)

21 February 2020
11:00

Henderson Eels (Solomon Islands)	3–2	(Fiji) Lautoka
Watemae 72'; Lea'i 87'; Nawo 90+6'	Report	Ali 29'; Caunter 51' (pen.)

Luganville Soccer Stadium, Luganville
Attendance: 1,800
Referee: Sione Lelenga (Tonga)
21 February 2020
15:00

Malampa Revivors (Vanuatu)	3–0	(Papua New Guinea) Lae City
Batick 34', 45+3', 58'	Report

Luganville Soccer Stadium, Luganville
Attendance: 4,200
Referee: Norbert Hauata (Tahiti)

=== Group C ===
All times were local, NCT (UTC+11).

Pos	Team	Pld	W	D	L	GF	GA	GD	Pts	Qualification	MAG	WAR	TIA	TUP
1	(New Caledonia) Magenta (H)	3	3	0	0	8	2	+6	9	Knockout stage	—	2–0	3–2	—
2	(Solomon Islands) Solomon Warriors	3	2	0	1	4	2	+2	6	Knockout stage	—	—	1–0	—
3	(French Polynesia) Tiare Tahiti	3	1	0	2	5	4	+1	3		—	—	—	3–0 (Note: Tupapa Maraerenga were ruled to have forfeited all matches, which were awarded as 3–0 wins to their opponents, due to their withdrawal.)
4	(Cook Islands) Tupapa Maraerenga	3	0	0	3	0	9	−9	0	Withdrew (Note: On 1 March 2020, the OFC announced that Tupapa Maraerenga had withdrawn from the group stage due to three of their players not being allowed to compete by the Directorate of Health and Social Affairs of New Caledonia as their immunization for measles could not be confirmed.)	0–3	0–3	—	—

Source: OFC
(H) Hosts
Notes:
1 March 2020
16:00

Solomon Warriors (Solomon Islands)	1–0	(French Polynesia) Tiare Tahiti
Ifunaoa 66'	Report

Stade Numa-Daly, Nouméa
Attendance: 150
Referee: Nick Waldron (New Zealand)
1 March 2020
19:00

Tupapa Maraerenga (Cook Islands)	Cancelled 0–3 Awarded	(New Caledonia) Magenta
	Report

Stade Numa-Daly, Nouméa
Referee: Sione Lelenga (Tonga)

4 March 2020
17:00

Tupapa Maraerenga (Cook Islands)	Cancelled 0–3 Awarded	(Solomon Islands) Solomon Warriors
	Report

Stade Numa-Daly, Nouméa
4 March 2020
20:00

Magenta (New Caledonia)	3–2	(French Polynesia) Tiare Tahiti
Nemia 45+4', 87'; Haring 51' (o.g.)	Report	Porlier 21', 76'

Stade Numa-Daly, Nouméa
Attendance: 450
Referee: Matthew Conger (New Zealand)

7 March 2020
16:00

Tiare Tahiti (French Polynesia)	Cancelled 3–0 Awarded	(Cook Islands) Tupapa Maraerenga
	Report

Stade Numa-Daly, Nouméa
7 March 2020
19:00

Magenta (New Caledonia)	2–0	(Solomon Islands) Solomon Warriors
Ranchain 16'; Hmaen 28'	Report

Stade Numa-Daly, Nouméa
Attendance: 550
Referee: Cory Mills (New Zealand)

=== Group D ===
Following a proposal by the Local Organising Committee in Tahiti, the OFC agreed to change the venue for Group D from Stade Pater, Pirae to Stade Municipal de Mahina, Mahina. However, due to heavy rain, the first match day of Group D would be played at Stade Pater after Stade Mahina was deemed not suitable for use by the Oceania Football Confederation in conjunction with the Local Organising Committee. All times were local, TAHT (UTC−10).

Pos	Team	Pld	W	D	L	GF	GA	GD	Pts	Qualification	AUC	VEN	LUP	BAF
1	(New Zealand) Auckland City	3	3	0	0	9	0	+9	9	Knockout stage	—	—	2–0	—
2	(French Polynesia) Vénus (H)	3	2	0	1	10	3	+7	6	Knockout stage	0–1	—	—	4–2
3	(Samoa) Lupe o le Soaga	3	1	0	2	4	11	−7	3		—	0–6	—	4–3
4	(Fiji) Ba	3	0	0	3	5	14	−9	0		0–6	—	—	—

Source: OFC
(H) Hosts
1 March 2020
17:00

Ba (Fiji)	0–6	(New Zealand) Auckland City
	Report	Vale 30'; Tade 39', 45+1'; Rogerson 58'; Bevan 72'; Kaltak 84'

Stade Pater, Pirae
Attendance: 350
Referee: Médéric Lacour (New Caledonia)
1 March 2020
20:00

Lupe o le Soaga (Samoa)	0–6	(French Polynesia) Vénus
	Report	Tetauira 30', 48', 88'; Tehau 33'; Setefano 51' (o.g.); Keck 76'

Stade Pater, Pirae
Attendance: 750
Referee: Joel Hopken (Vanuatu)

4 March 2020
17:00

Lupe o le Soaga (Samoa)	4–3	(Fiji) Ba
Mason 11'; Mosquera 29' (pen.); Taualai 38'; Ueligitone 42'	Report	Tiwa 72'; Waqa 74'; Drudru 76'

Stade Municipal de Mahina, Mahina
Attendance: 350
Referee: Hamilton Siau (Solomon Islands)
4 March 2020
20:00

Vénus (French Polynesia)	0–1	(New Zealand) Auckland City
	Report	Bevan 42'

Stade Municipal de Mahina, Mahina
Attendance: 1,500
Referee: David Yareboinen (Papua New Guinea)

7 March 2020
17:00

Auckland City (New Zealand)	2–0	(Samoa) Lupe o le Soaga
Kaltak 30'; Manickum 68'	Report

Stade Municipal de Mahina, Mahina
Attendance: 250
Referee: George Time (Solomon Islands)
7 March 2020
20:00

Vénus (French Polynesia)	4–2	(Fiji) Ba
Tehau 29', 45+2', 55'; Barbe 36'	Report	Drudru 2'; Totori 10'

Stade Municipal de Mahina, Mahina
Attendance: 850
Referee: Médéric Lacour (New Caledonia)
