= Public holidays in Wallis and Futuna =

This is a list of holidays in Wallis and Futuna.

== List ==
2018
Date	English name
1 January	New Year's Day
Monday after Easter Sunday (2018 date: 2 April)	Easter Monday
28 April	Saint Pierre-Chanel Day
1 May	Labour Day
8 May	Victory Day
Thirty-nine days after Easter Sunday (2018 date: 10 May)	Ascension Day
Fifty days after Easter Sunday (2018 date: 21 May)	Whit Monday
29 June	Saints Peter and Paul
14 July	Bastille Day
29 July	Territory Day
15 August	Assumption Day
1 November	All Saints' Day
11 November	Armistice Day
25 December	Christmas Day

2019
Date	English name
1 January	New Year's Day
Monday after Easter Sunday (2019 date: 22 April)	Easter Monday
28 April	Saint Pierre-Chanel Day
1 May	Labour Day
8 May	Victory Day
Thirty-nine days after Easter Sunday (2019 date: 30 May)	Ascension Day
Fifty days after Easter Sunday (2019 date: 10 June)	Whit Monday
29 June	Saints Peter and Paul
14 July	Bastille Day
29 July	Territory Day
15 August	Assumption Day
1 November	All Saints' Day
11 November	Armistice Day
25 December	Christmas Day
