= 2020 OFC Champions League =

Tournament details
- Host countries: Qualifying stage: New Zealand; Group stage: Papua New Guinea; Vanuatu; New Caledonia; Tahiti
- Dates: Qualifying stage: 25–31 January 2020; Group stage: 15 February – 7 March 2020; Knockout stage: Cancelled (originally 4 April – 16 May 2020)
- Teams: Competition proper: 16; Total: 18 (from 11 associations)

Final positions
- Champions: Not awarded

Tournament statistics
- Matches played: 24
- Goals scored: 92 (3.83 per match)
- Attendance: 27,400 (1,142 per match)
- Top scorer: Martín Bueno (6 goals)

The 2020 OFC Champions League was the 19th edition of the Oceanian Club Championship, Oceania's premier club football tournament organized by the Oceania Football Confederation (OFC), and the 14th season under the current OFC Champions League name.

The tournament was suspended in March 2020 after the group stage due to the COVID-19 pandemic. On 4 September 2020, the OFC announced that the tournament was abandoned due to the border and travel restrictions caused by the COVID-19 pandemic, and no champions would be awarded. The OFC representative at the 2020 FIFA Club World Cup in Qatar, which would originally be the winners of the 2020 OFC Champions League, was confirmed to be Auckland City on 19 November 2020 following a decision by the OFC Executive Committee, based on the principles within the competition regulations of the OFC Champions League which established a ranking of each team after the group stage, which was topped by Auckland City. However, on 15 January 2021, FIFA announced that Auckland City had withdrawn from the competition due to the COVID-19 pandemic and related quarantine measures required by the New Zealand authorities, meaning that no OFC representatives competed in the tournament.

Hienghène Sport were the defending champions, but were eliminated in the group stage.

== Teams ==
Location of teams of the 2020 OFC Champions League.
Teams entering the group stage; (H) Group stage host
Teams entering the qualifying stage; ~~Teams which withdrew~~

A total of 18 teams from all 11 OFC member associations entered the competition.

- The seven developed associations (Fiji, New Caledonia, New Zealand, Papua New Guinea, Solomon Islands, Tahiti, Vanuatu) were awarded two berths each in the group stage.
- The four developing associations (American Samoa, Cook Islands, Samoa, Tonga) were awarded one berth each in the qualifying stage, with the winners and runners-up advancing to the group stage.

Teams entering the group stage
Association	Team	Qualifying method
Fiji	Ba	2019 Fiji Premier League champions
Fiji	Lautoka	2019 Fiji Premier League runners-up
New Caledonia	Magenta	2018 New Caledonia Super Ligue champions
New Caledonia	Hienghène Sport	2018 New Caledonia Super Ligue runners-up
New Zealand	Eastern Suburbs	2018–19 New Zealand Football Championship finals series champions
New Zealand	Auckland City	2018–19 New Zealand Football Championship regular season premiers
Papua New Guinea	Lae City	2019 Papua New Guinea National Soccer League champions
Papua New Guinea	Hekari United	2019 Papua New Guinea National Soccer League runners-up
Solomon Islands	Solomon Warriors	2019–20 Solomon Islands S-League champions
Solomon Islands	Henderson Eels	2019–20 Solomon Islands S-League runners-up
Tahiti	Vénus	2018–19 Tahiti Ligue 1 champions
Tahiti	Tiare Tahiti	2018–19 Tahiti Ligue 1 runners-up
Vanuatu	Malampa Revivors	2019 VFF National Super League grand final champions
Vanuatu	Galaxy	2019 VFF National Super League grand final runners-up

Teams entering the qualifying stage
Association	Team	Qualifying method
American Samoa	Pago Youth	2018 FFAS Senior League champions
Cook Islands	Tupapa Maraerenga	2019 Cook Islands Round Cup champions
Samoa	Lupe o le Soaga	2019 Samoa National League champions
Tonga	Veitongo	2019 Tonga Major League champions

Notes

1. Solomon Islands (SOL): Since the 2019–20 Solomon Islands S-League was not finished at the end of 2019, Solomon Warriors and Henderson Eels, which were both assured of a top two finish and thus had qualified for the 2020 OFC Champions League at that time, were placed in the group stage following their ranking at the end of 2019. The league continued in 2020, and Solomon Warriors and Henderson Eels eventually finished in the same positions as champions and runners-up respectively.

== Schedule ==
The schedule of the competition was as follows. For this season, the qualifying stage was originally brought forward from January 2020 to December 2019 to coincide with the end of the participating Member Associations' national league seasons, and to be played in Samoa. However, it was later delayed to January 2020 and moved to New Zealand.

On 9 March 2020, the OFC announced that all OFC tournaments were postponed until 6 May 2020 due to the COVID-19 pandemic. On 14 May 2020, it was announced that the quarter-finals had been postponed until September 2020 at the earliest. On 28 July 2020, the OFC announced that the knockout matches would take place at a single location, with the decision of the dates and venue to be made by the OFC Executive Committee on 31 August 2020. On 4 September 2020, the OFC announced that the tournament was abandoned.

Stage	Draw date	Match dates
Qualifying stage	13 December 2019	25–31 January 2020 (New Zealand)
Group stage	13 December 2019	Group A: 16–22 February 2020 (Papua New Guinea); Group B: 15–21 February 2020 (Vanuatu); Group C: 1–7 March 2020 (New Caledonia); Group D: 1–7 March 2020 (Tahiti)
Quarter-finals	Cancelled	Cancelled (originally 4–5 April 2020)
Semi-finals	Cancelled	Cancelled (originally 25–26 April 2020)
Final	Cancelled	Cancelled (originally 16 May 2020)

== Qualifying stage ==
The draw and the hosts of the qualifying stage were announced by the OFC on 13 December 2019. The four teams in the qualifying stage played each other on a round-robin basis at a centralised venue. The winners and runners-up advanced to the group stage to join the 14 direct entrants. On 17 December 2019, the OFC announced that Pago Youth had withdrawn from the qualifying stage due to concerns about the measles outbreak in the Pacific. Matches were played between 25–31 January 2020 in New Zealand.

Pos	Team	Pld	W	D	L	GF	GA	GD	Pts	Qualification	LUP	TUP	VEI	PAG
1	(Samoa) Lupe o le Soaga	2	1	1	0	2	0	+2	4	Group stage	—	—	2–0	—
2	(Cook Islands) Tupapa Maraerenga	2	0	2	0	2	2	0	2	Group stage	0–0	—	—	—
3	(Tonga) Veitongo	2	0	1	1	2	4	−2	1		—	2–2	—	—
4	(American Samoa) Pago Youth	0	0	0	0	0	0	0	0	Withdrew	—	—	—	—

Source: OFC

== Group stage ==
The draw and the hosts of the qualifying stage were announced by the OFC on 13 December 2019. The 16 teams (14 teams entering the group stage and two teams advancing from the qualifying stage) were drawn into four groups of four. The four teams in each group played each other on a round-robin basis at a centralised venue. The winners and runners-up of each group advanced to the quarter-finals of the knockout stage. Matches were played on the following dates and venues:

- Group A matches were played between 16–22 February 2020 in Papua New Guinea.
- Group B matches were played between 15–21 February 2020 in Vanuatu.
- Group C matches were played between 1–7 March 2020 in New Caledonia.
- Group D matches were played between 1–7 March 2020 in Tahiti.

=== Group A ===
Pos	Team	Pld	W	D	L	GF	GA	GD	Pts	Qualification	EAS	GAL	HEK	HIE
1	(New Zealand) Eastern Suburbs	3	2	1	0	8	3	+5	7	Knockout stage	—	—	2–1	—
2	(Vanuatu) Galaxy	3	1	1	1	7	5	+2	4	Knockout stage	2–2	—	—	4–1
3	(Papua New Guinea) Hekari United (H)	3	1	1	1	5	5	0	4		—	2–1	—	—
4	(New Caledonia) Hienghène Sport	3	0	1	2	3	10	−7	1		0–4	—	2–2	—

Source: OFC
(H) Hosts

=== Group B ===
Pos	Team	Pld	W	D	L	GF	GA	GD	Pts	Qualification	MAL	HEN	LAE	LAU
1	(Vanuatu) Malampa Revivors (H)	3	1	2	0	6	3	+3	5	Knockout stage	—	2–2	3–0	—
2	(Solomon Islands) Henderson Eels	3	1	2	0	8	7	+1	5	Knockout stage	—	—	—	3–2
3	(Papua New Guinea) Lae City	3	1	1	1	10	6	+4	4		—	3–3	—	—
4	(Fiji) Lautoka	3	0	1	2	3	11	−8	1		1–1	—	0–7	—

Source: OFC
(H) Hosts

=== Group C ===
Pos	Team	Pld	W	D	L	GF	GA	GD	Pts	Qualification	MAG	WAR	TIA	TUP
1	(New Caledonia) Magenta (H)	3	3	0	0	8	2	+6	9	Knockout stage	—	2–0	3–2	—
2	(Solomon Islands) Solomon Warriors	3	2	0	1	4	2	+2	6	Knockout stage	—	—	1–0	—
3	(French Polynesia) Tiare Tahiti	3	1	0	2	5	4	+1	3		—	—	—	3–0 (Note: Tupapa Maraerenga were ruled to have forfeited all matches, which were awarded as 3–0 wins to their opponents, due to their withdrawal.)
4	(Cook Islands) Tupapa Maraerenga	3	0	0	3	0	9	−9	0	Withdrew (Note: On 1 March 2020, the OFC announced that Tupapa Maraerenga had withdrawn from the group stage due to three of their players not being allowed to compete by the Directorate of Health and Social Affairs of New Caledonia as their immunization for measles could not be confirmed.)	0–3	0–3	—	—

Source: OFC
(H) Hosts

=== Group D ===
Pos	Team	Pld	W	D	L	GF	GA	GD	Pts	Qualification	AUC	VEN	LUP	BAF
1	(New Zealand) Auckland City	3	3	0	0	9	0	+9	9	Knockout stage	—	—	2–0	—
2	(French Polynesia) Vénus (H)	3	2	0	1	10	3	+7	6	Knockout stage	0–1	—	—	4–2
3	(Samoa) Lupe o le Soaga	3	1	0	2	4	11	−7	3		—	0–6	—	4–3
4	(Fiji) Ba	3	0	0	3	5	14	−9	0		0–6	—	—	—

Source: OFC
(H) Hosts

== Knockout stage ==
=== Qualified teams ===
The winners and runners-up of each of the four groups in the group stage would have played in the knockout stage, before it was cancelled.

Group	Winners	Runners-up
A	(New Zealand) Eastern Suburbs	(Vanuatu) Galaxy
B	(Vanuatu) Malampa Revivors	(Solomon Islands) Henderson Eels
C	(New Caledonia) Magenta	(Solomon Islands) Solomon Warriors
D	(New Zealand) Auckland City	(French Polynesia) Vénus

== Qualification to FIFA Club World Cup ==
Due to the abandonment of the tournament, the OFC decided to nominate the team with the best record in the group stage as their representative at the 2020 FIFA Club World Cup.

Pos	Grp	Team	Pld	W	D	L	GF	GA	GD	Pts	Qualification
1	D	(New Zealand) Auckland City	3	3	0	0	9	0	+9	9	2020 FIFA Club World Cup
2	C	(New Caledonia) Magenta	3	3	0	0	8	2	+6	9	
3	A	(New Zealand) Eastern Suburbs	3	2	1	0	8	3	+5	7	
4	D	(French Polynesia) Vénus	3	2	0	1	10	3	+7	6	
5	C	(Solomon Islands) Solomon Warriors	3	2	0	1	4	2	+2	6	
6	B	(Vanuatu) Malampa Revivors	3	1	2	0	6	3	+3	5	
7	B	(Solomon Islands) Henderson Eels	3	1	2	0	8	7	+1	5	
8	B	(Papua New Guinea) Lae City	3	1	1	1	10	6	+4	4	
9	A	(Vanuatu) Galaxy	3	1	1	1	7	5	+2	4	
10	A	(Papua New Guinea) Hekari United	3	1	1	1	5	5	0	4	
11	C	(French Polynesia) Tiare Tahiti	3	1	0	2	5	4	+1	3	
12	D	(Samoa) Lupe o le Soaga	3	1	0	2	4	11	−7	3	
13	A	(New Caledonia) Hienghène Sport	3	0	1	2	3	10	−7	1	
14	B	(Fiji) Lautoka	3	0	1	2	3	11	−8	1	
15	D	(Fiji) Ba	3	0	0	3	5	14	−9	0	
16	C	(Cook Islands) Tupapa Maraerenga	3	0	0	3	0	9	−9	0	

Source: OFC
Rules for classification: 1) Points; 2) Goal difference; 3) Goals scored (Regulations Article 31).

== Top goalscorers ==
Team eliminated / inactive for this round.

Rank	Player	Team	QS1	QS2	QS3	GS1	GS2	GS3	Total
1	(Uruguay) Martín Bueno	(New Zealand) Eastern Suburbs				2	2	2	6
2	(Papua New Guinea) Emmanuel Simon	(Papua New Guinea) Lae City				2	2		4
2	(French Polynesia) Teaonui Tehau	(French Polynesia) Vénus				1		3	4
4	(Vanuatu) Andre Batick	(Vanuatu) Malampa Revivors						3	3
4	(Papua New Guinea) Nigel Dabinyaba	(Papua New Guinea) Lae City				1	2		3
4	(Solomon Islands) Joses Nawo	(Solomon Islands) Henderson Eels					2	1	3
4	(French Polynesia) Tamatoa Tetauira	(French Polynesia) Vénus				3			3
8	(New Caledonia) Joseph Athale	(New Caledonia) Hienghène Sport				1	1		2
8	(New Zealand) Myer Bevan	(New Zealand) Auckland City				1	1		2
8	(England) Terence Carter	(Vanuatu) Galaxy				1	1		2
8	(New Zealand) Jack Caunter	(Fiji) Lautoka				1		1	2
8	(Fiji) Samuela Drudru	(Fiji) Ba					1	1	2
8	(Papua New Guinea) Raymond Gunemba	(Papua New Guinea) Lae City					2		2
8	(Vanuatu) Brian Kaltak	(New Zealand) Auckland City				1		1	2
8	(Papua New Guinea) Ati Kepo	(Papua New Guinea) Hekari United						2	2
8	(Solomon Islands) Raphael Le'ai	(Solomon Islands) Henderson Eels				1		1	2
8	(New Caledonia) Kevin Nemia	(New Caledonia) Magenta					2		2
8	(Tonga) Hema Polovili	(Tonga) Veitongo			2				2
8	(French Polynesia) Manarii Porlier	(French Polynesia) Tiare Tahiti					2		2
8	(Brazil) Roberson	(Vanuatu) Galaxy				1	1		2
8	(Argentina) Emiliano Tade	(New Zealand) Auckland City				2			2
8	(Solomon Islands) Tutizama Tanito	(Solomon Islands) Henderson Eels				2			2
