= 2016 Cook Islands Round Cup =

Cook Islands Round Cup
- Season: 2016
- Champions: Puaikura
- Promoted: None
- Relegated: None
- 2017 OFC Champions League: Puaikura
- Matches: 42
- Goals: 187 (4.45 per match)
- Average goals/game: 4.45
- Biggest home win: Tupapa Maraerenga 8–0 Matavera
- Biggest away win: Titikaveka 0–11 Puaikura
- Highest scoring: Titikaveka 0–11 Puaikura

The 2016 Cook Islands Round Cup is the forty-third recorded season of top flight association football competition in the Cook Islands, with any results between 1951 and 1969 and also in 1986 and 1988–1990 currently unknown. Puaikura won the championship going unbeaten through the entire season to qualify for the 2017 OFC Champions League.

== League table ==
| Pos | Team | Pld | W | D | L | GF | GA | GD | Pts | Qualification |
|---|---|---|---|---|---|---|---|---|---|---|
| 1 | Puaikura (C) | 12 | 10 | 2 | 0 | 50 | 10 | +40 | 32 | Qualification to the 2017 OFC Champions League |
| 2 | Tupapa Maraerenga | 12 | 7 | 1 | 4 | 32 | 20 | +12 | 22 | |
| 3 | Takuvaine | 12 | 6 | 4 | 2 | 34 | 24 | +10 | 22 | |
| 4 | Nikao Sokattak | 12 | 5 | 5 | 2 | 25 | 13 | +12 | 20 | |
| 5 | Avatiu | 12 | 4 | 2 | 6 | 18 | 38 | −20 | 14 | |
| 6 | Titikaveka | 12 | 1 | 1 | 10 | 21 | 48 | −27 | 4 | |
| 7 | Matavera | 12 | 1 | 1 | 10 | 7 | 34 | −27 | 4 | |

Updated to match(es) played on 25 November 2016. Source:
Rules for classification: 1) points; 2) goal difference; 3) number of goals scored.
(C) Champions

== Results ==
| Home \ Away | AVA | MAT | NIK | PUA | TAK | TIT | TUP |
|---|---|---|---|---|---|---|---|
| Avatiu | | 2–0 | 0–7 | 0–4 | 3–2 | 2–1 | 2–5 |
| Matavera | 1–1 | | 0–1 | 0–3 | 2–3 | 1–0 | 1–2 |
| Nikao Sokattak | 1–1 | 2–0 | | 0–3 | 3–3 | 5–0 | 0–2 |
| Puaikura | 4–0 | 3–1 | 0–0 | | 6–2 | 8–3 | 5–2 |
| Takuvaine | 6–2 | 4–1 | 1–1 | 1–1 | | 3–0 | 2–1 |
| Titikaveka | 4–5 | 4–0 | 2–4 | 0–11 | 3–3 | | 3–4 |
| Tupapa Maraerenga | 3–0 | 8–0 | 1–1 | 1–2 | 1–3 | 2–1 | |

Updated to match(es) played on 25 November 2016. Source:
Legend: Blue = home team win; Yellow = draw; Red = away team win.
