= Society of Environmental Journalists =

American non-profit organization

- Formation: 1990
- Type: non-profit educational
- Headquarters: Washington, DC
- Members: professional journalists
- Website: www.sej.org

The Society of Environmental Journalists is a non-profit national journalism organization based in the United States, created by and for journalists who report environmental topics in the news media. On its website, the organization says that "SEJ’s mission is to strengthen the quality, reach and viability of journalism across all media to advance public understanding of environmental issues."

== History ==
The Society of Environmental Journalists was founded in 1990 by a small group of award-winning journalists, including reporters, editors, and producers working for The Philadelphia Inquirer, USA Today, Turner Broadcasting, Minnesota Public Radio, and National Geographic. Today, SEJ's membership includes more than 1,500 journalists and academics working in every type of news media in the United States, Canada, Mexico and 27 other countries.

As a 501(c)(3) non-profit educational organization, SEJ offers educational opportunities and support to journalists of all media covering environmental issues.

SEJ operating and project budgets are underwritten through a combination of foundation grants based on SEJ proposals (emphasis on general, unrestricted support), university sponsorships of the annual conference, media company contributions, earned income from dues and fees for services (including exhibits, and space and single use rental of the mail list/email distribution listserv) and earnings from individual gifts to the endowment fund. SEJ does not seek or accept gifts or grants from government agencies, non-media corporations or environmental advocacy groups. Lobbyists and public relations professionals are not eligible for membership in SEJ. All are welcome to subscribe to SEJournal and participate in SEJ's annual conferences.

== Activities ==
SEJ provides support to journalists of all media in their efforts to responsibly cover complex issues concerning the environment.

SEJ offers educational programs and services for working journalists, educators, and students, including annual and regional conferences; a daily EJToday news service; a quarterly SEJournal; a biweekly TipSheet and other publications; the FOI WatchDog project; the SEJ Awards for Reporting on the Environment; members-only listservs; a mentoring program; website-based resources; and a lively membership network of journalists and academics.

The SEJ has criticized the Environmental Protection Agency for its policy of restricting independent scientists who advise the agency from talking to media outlets without the Agency's permission.

== Objectivity ==
The SEJ is frequently accused on conservative blogs of being "unwilling to think or report critically about environmental issues". The editor of one of the organization's online publications replies that the SEJ "has worked hard to uphold the distinction between environmental journalism and environmentalism", and notes that its members have produced "countless instances of fair, impartial, and incisive reporting".

'Objectivity as Independence: Creating the Society of Environmental Journalists, 1989–1997', by John Palen, provides an in-depth look at SEJ's creation and the philosophy of its founders. His paper was presented at the national convention of the Association for Education in Journalism and Mass Communications in Baltimore, Maryland, in August 1998.

== See also ==
- Environmental journalism
