= Public holidays in Niue =

This is a list of holidays in Niue.

2018
Date	English name
1 January	New Year's Day
2 January	Takai Commission Holiday
Friday before Easter Sunday	Good Friday
Monday after Easter Sunday	Easter Monday
First Monday in June	King's Official Birthday
19 October	Constitution Day
Fourth Monday in October	Peniamina Gospel Day
25 December	Christmas Day
26 December	Boxing Day
