= Ngahue Reserve =

Multi-purpose stadium in Auckland, New Zealand

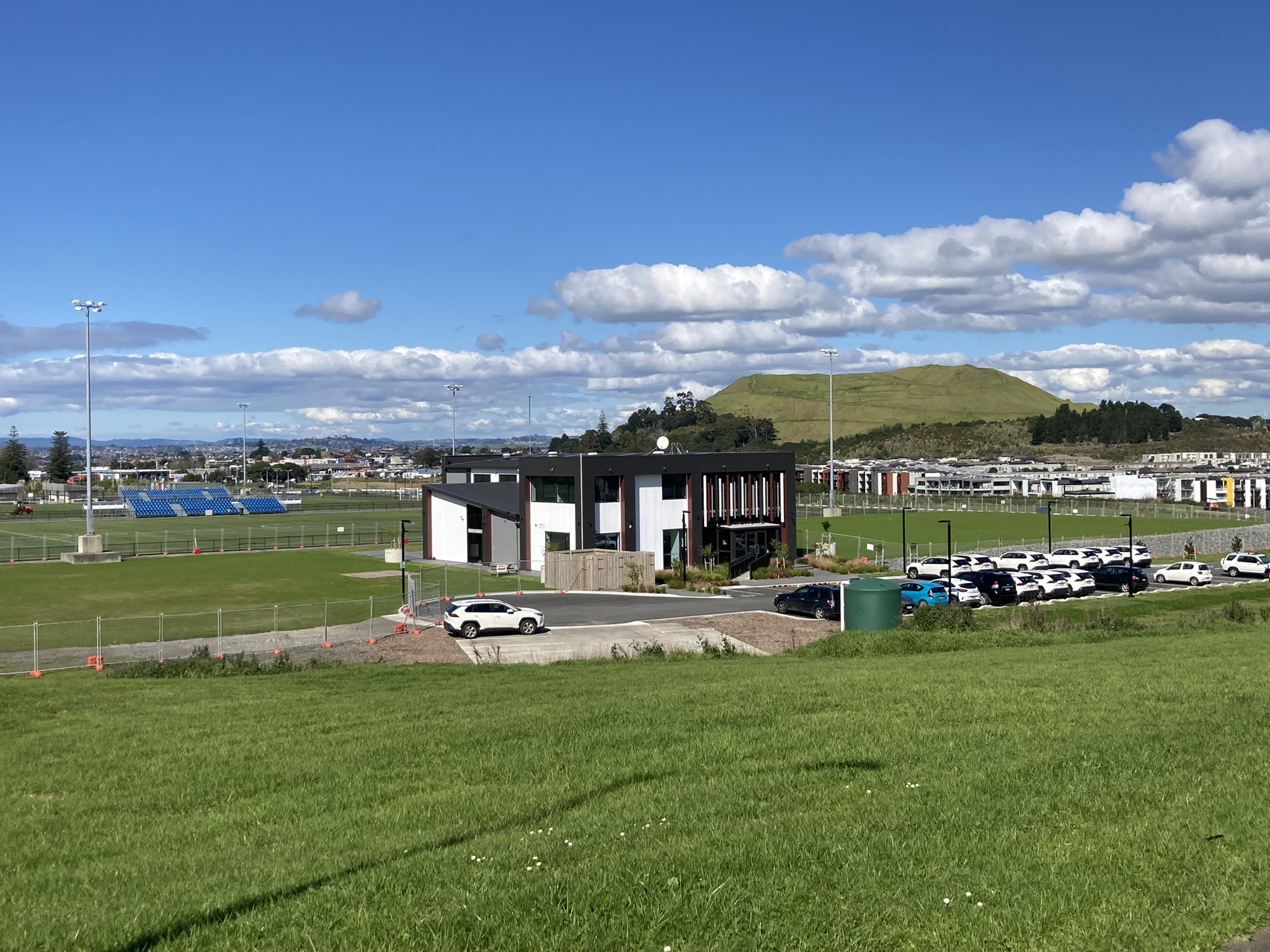
- Buildings and fields at Ngahue Reserve
- Interactive map of Ngahue Reserve
- Location: 62-80 College Road, St Johns, Auckland
- Coordinates: 36.881657°S 174.842437°E
- Owner: Oceania Football Confederation
- Operator: Oceania Football Confederation
- Surface: Artificial grass

Construction
- Groundbreaking: 2013
- Opened: 2014

Ngahue Reserve is a multi-purpose stadium in the suburb of St Johns in Auckland, New Zealand. It is used for association football matches and is the home of Oceania Football Confederation. It is also used as a training ground for Eastern Suburbs.

Ngahue Reserve was the venue of the 2022 OFC Champions League.

== History ==
From the mid 18th to early 19th centuries, the Ngāti Paoa had Te Tauoma pā close to the site of what is now Ngahue Reserve. It was sold to the government as part of the Kohimarama Block on 28 May 1841. There were many hue gourd fruit on this block.

The land which is now Ngahue Reserve became a landfill that consisted of composting rejected materials. In 1986 the landfill was closed and became a cleanfill site. The cleanfill site did not include putrescible and organic material and metal objects unlike the landfill previously. In 1989 the site was capped until 1997 before being recontoured.

In 2014 the two artificial pitches were completed. The OFC facilities were not completed until the following year.
