= Tauhiti Keck =

Tahitian footballer (born 1994)

Personal information
- Date of birth: 1 August 1994 (age 32)
- Place of birth: Tahiti
- Height: 1.83 m (6 ft 0 in)
- Position: Midfielder

Team information
- Current team: A.S. Tefana

Senior career*
Years	Team	Apps	(Gls)
2010–2014	A.S. Temanava		
2014–	A.S. Tefana		

International career^{‡}
2011	Tahiti U17	5	(0)
2011–	Tahiti	16	(6)
Medal record
Men's football
Representing Tahiti
OFC Nations Cup
Third place	2024 Fiji/Vanuatu
- * Club domestic league appearances and goals as of 23 June 2016 ‡ National team caps and goals as of 22 June 2024

Tauhiti Keck (born 1 August 1994) is a Tahitian footballer who plays as a midfielder for A.S. Tefana in the Tahiti Ligue 1.

== Career statistics ==
=== International ===
As of match played 21 March 2026

Appearances and goals by national team and year
National team	Year	Apps	Goals
Tahiti	2011	1	0
Tahiti	2012	–	
Tahiti	2013	–	
Tahiti	2014	–	
Tahiti	2015	–	
Tahiti	2016	4	1
Tahiti	2017	1	1
Tahiti	2018	–	
Tahiti	2019	–	
Tahiti	2020	–	
Tahiti	2021	–	
Tahiti	2022	2	0
Tahiti	2023	5	4
Tahiti	2024	5	0
Tahiti	2025	1	0
Total		19	6

Scores and results list Tahiti's goal tally first, score column indicates score after each Keck goal.

List of international goals scored by Tauhiti Keck
No.	Date	Venue	Opponent	Score	Result	Competition
1	8 November 2016	Stade Pater Te Hono Nui, Pirae, Tahiti	Solomon Islands	1–0	1–0	2018 FIFA World Cup qualification
2	28 March 2017	Stade Pater Te Hono Nui, Pirae, Tahiti	Papua New Guinea	1–2	1–2	2018 FIFA World Cup qualification
3	28 August 2023	Stade Pater Te Hono Nui, Pirae, Tahiti	Cook Islands	6–0	9–1	Friendly
4	28 August 2023	Stade Pater Te Hono Nui, Pirae, Tahiti	Cook Islands	8–1	9–1	Friendly
5	28 August 2023	Stade Pater Te Hono Nui, Pirae, Tahiti	Cook Islands	9–1	9–1	Friendly
6	1 September 2023	Stade Pater Te Hono Nui, Pirae, Tahiti	Cook Islands	1–0	3–0	Friendly

== Honours ==
- OFC Nations Cup: 3rd place 2024
