= Ukraine at the 2007 Summer Universiade =

- IOC code: UKR

in Bangkok 8 — 18 August 2007
- Competitors: 213 in 13 sports
- Medals Ranked 3rd: Gold 28 Silver 20 Bronze 18 Total 66

Summer Universiade appearances (overview)
- 1993; 1995; 1997; 1999; 2001; 2003; 2005; 2007; 2009; 2011; 2013; 2015; 2017; 2019; 2021

Ukraine competed at the 2007 Summer Universiade in Bangkok, Thailand, from 8 to 18 August 2007. Ukrainian athletes did not compete in badminton, golf, softball, and water polo. Ukrainian men's basketball team finished 14th. Ukrainian men's volleyball team finished 6th.

== Medal summary ==
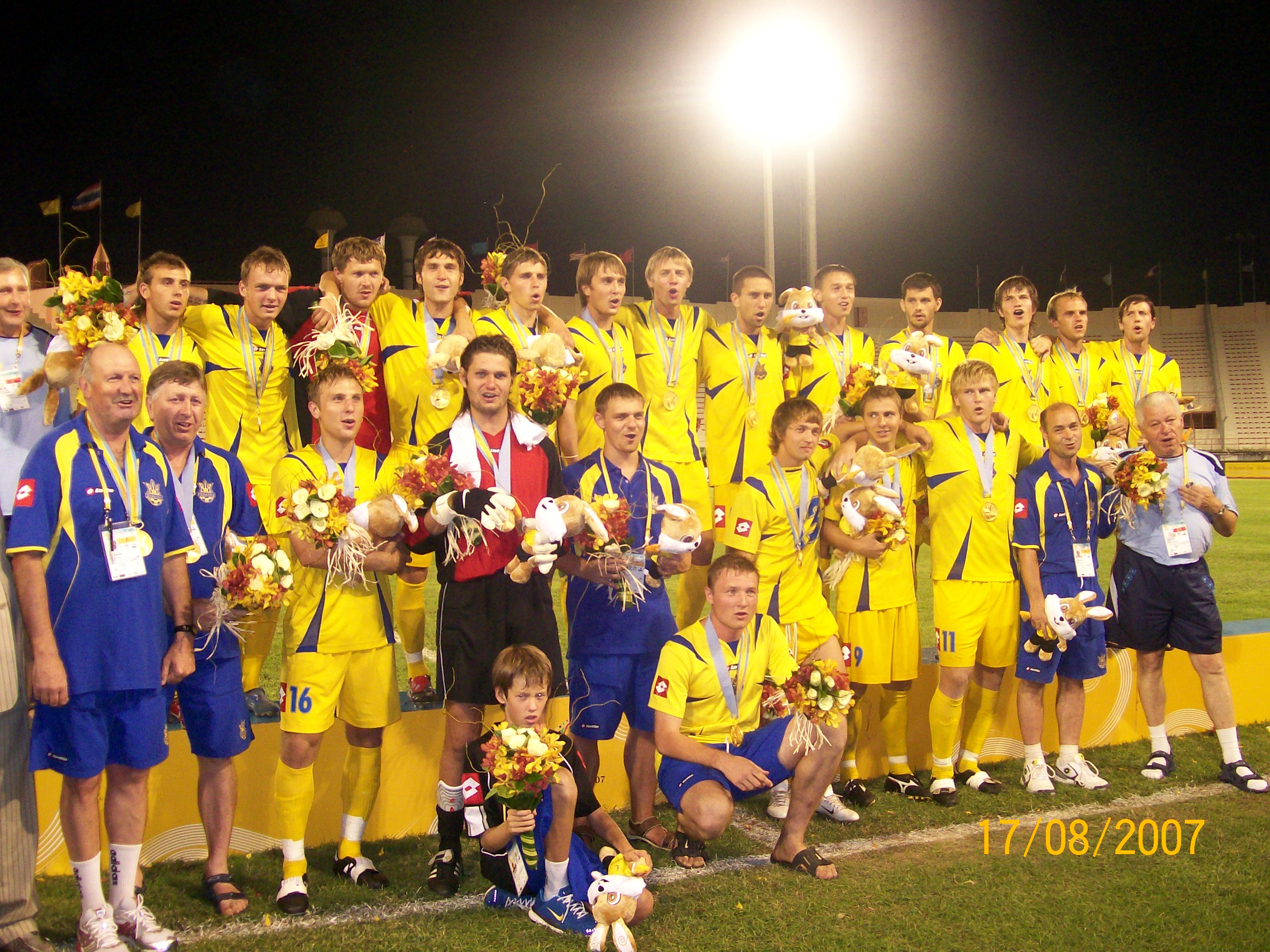
Ukraine men's football team at the 2007 Universiade

=== Medal by sports ===
Medals by sport
Sport	1st place, gold medalist(s)	2nd place, silver medalist(s)	3rd place, bronze medalist(s)	Total
Rhythmic gymnastics	6	1	1	8
Athletics	5	6	4	15
Swimming	4	3	3	10
Fencing	4	2	2	8
Artistic gymnastics	4	2	1	7
Shooting	3	5	4	12
Diving	1	0	3	4
Football	1	0	0	1
Judo	0	1	1	2
Total	28	20	18	66

=== Medalists ===
Medal	Name	Sport	Event
Gold	Oleksandr Vorobiov	Artistic gymnastics	Men's rings
Gold	Andriy Isayev	Artistic gymnastics	Men's vault
Gold	Dariya Zgoba	Artistic gymnastics	Women's uneven bars
Gold	Olga Shcherbatykh	Artistic gymnastics	Women's vault
Gold	Serhiy Demydyuk	Athletics	Men's 110 metres hurdles
Gold	Iryna Shtanhyeyeva	Athletics	Women's 200 metres
Gold	Yuliya Krevsun	Athletics	Women's 800 metres
Gold	Nataliya Pyhyda; Antonina Yefremova; Olha Zavhorodnya; Oksana Shcherbak	Athletics	Women's 4 × 400 metres relay
Gold	Olha Saladukha	Athletics	Women's triple jump
Gold	Mariya Voloshchenko	Diving	Women's 1 metre springboard
Gold	Maksym Khvorost; Dmytro Karyuchenko; Vitaly Medvedev; Oleh Sokolov	Fencing	Men's team épée
Gold	Dmytro Boiko; Oleksandr Torchuk; Oleh Shturbabin; Andriy Yahodka	Fencing	Men's team sabre
Gold	Yana Shemyakina	Fencing	Women's individual épée
Gold	Yana Shemyakina; Olena Kryvytska; Olha Partala; Olena Reizlina	Fencing	Women's team épée
Gold	Ukraine national student football team: Volodymyr Ikonnykov Artem Shtanko Andriy Zaporozhan Anton Monakhov Roman Bochkur Andriy Bashlay Artem Starhorodskyi Roman Voynarovskyi Andriy Misyaylo Ihor Hordya Dmytro Pronevych Roman Lutsenko Mykola Revutskyi Vadym Hostiev Oleh Herasymyuk Ihor Khudobyak Andriy Shevchuk Dmytro Hunchenko	Football	Men's team
Gold	Anna Bessonova	Rhythmic gymnastics	Individual all-around
Gold	Anna Bessonova	Rhythmic gymnastics	Individual rope
Gold	Anna Bessonova	Rhythmic gymnastics	Individual hoop
Gold	Anna Bessonova	Rhythmic gymnastics	Individual ribbon
Gold	Anna Bessonova	Rhythmic gymnastics	Individual clubs
Gold	Nadya Vasina; Vita Zubchenko; Iryna Kovalchuk; Inga Kozhokhina; Polina Kondaurova; Olha Skuradova	Rhythmic gymnastics	Group 5 ropes
Gold	Maksym Komirenko	Shooting	Men's 50 metre rifle prone
Gold	Natalia Chepurina	Shooting	Women's 50 metre rifle prone
Gold	Yuliya Korostylova; Olena Kostevych; Inna Kriachko	Shooting	Women's team 10 metre air pistol
Gold	Ihor Borysyk	Swimming	Men's 50 m breaststroke
Gold	Valeriy Dymo	Swimming	Men's 100 m breaststroke
Gold	Serhiy Breus	Swimming	Men's 50 m butterfly
Gold	Yana Klochkova	Swimming	Women's 400 m individual medley
Silver	Olga Shcherbatykh	Artistic gymnastics	Women's individual all-around
Silver	Maryna Kostiuchenko; Maryna Proskurina; Dariya Zgoba; Alina Kozich; Olga Shcherbatykh	Artistic gymnastics	Women's team all-around
Silver	Viktor Kuznyetsov	Athletics	Men's triple jump
Silver	Olena Chebanu	Athletics	Women's 100 metres
Silver	Tetyana Holovchenko	Athletics	Women's 1500 metres
Silver	Tetyana Holovchenko	Athletics	Women's 5000 metres
Silver	Valentyna Horpynych	Athletics	Women's 3000 metres steeplechase
Silver	Anastasiya Rabchenyuk	Athletics	Women's 400 metres hurdles
Silver	Halyna Pundyk	Fencing	Women's individual sabre
Silver	Halyna Pundyk; Olha Zhovnir; Nina Kozlova; Olena Khomrova	Fencing	Women's team sabre
Silver	Maksym Korotun	Judo	Men's extra-lightweight (60 kg)
Silver	Nadya Vasina; Vita Zubchenko; Iryna Kovalchuk; Inga Kozhokhina; Polina Kondaurova; Olha Skuradova	Rhythmic gymnastics	Group all-around
Silver	Ivan Rybovalov	Shooting	Men's 50 metre pistol
Silver	Yuriy Nikandrov	Shooting	Men's trap
Silver	Ivan Rybovalov; Ivan Bidnyak; Serhiy Kudrya	Shooting	Men's team 50 metre pistol
Silver	Maksym Komirenko; Mykola Vdovychenko; Denys Chumachenko	Shooting	Men's team 50 metre rifle prone
Silver	Olena Kostevych	Shooting	Women's 10 metre air pistol
Silver	Serhiy Fesenko	Swimming	Men's 1500 m freestyle
Silver	Kateryna Zubkova	Swimming	Women's 100 m backstroke
Silver	Yana Klochkova	Swimming	Women's 200 m individual medley
Bronze	Dmytro Gyrenko; Andriy Isayev; Anton Novosolov; Maksym Ovchinnikov; Oleksandr Vorobiov	Artistic gymnastics	Men's team all-around
Bronze	Oleksandr Nartov	Athletics	Men's high jump
Bronze	Yevheniya Snihur	Athletics	Women's 100 metres hurdles
Bronze	Olena Chebanu; Halyna Tonkovyd; Iryna Shtanhyeyeva; Iryna Shepetyuk	Athletics	Women's 4 × 100 metres relay
Bronze	Hanna Melnychenko	Athletics	Women's heptathlon
Bronze	Yuriy Shlyakhov	Diving	Men's 1 metre springboard
Bronze	Dmytro Lysenko; Anton Zakharov	Diving	Men's 3 metre synchronized springboard
Bronze	Yuriy Shlyakhov; Illya Kvasha; Oleksiy Pryhorov; Dmytro Lysenko; Anton Zakharov; Kostyantyn Milyayev	Diving	Men's team trophy
Bronze	Maksym Khvorost	Fencing	Men's individual épée
Bronze	Maksym Petrov	Fencing	Men's individual foil
Bronze	Vitaliy Polyanskyy	Judo	Men's openweight
Bronze	Natalia Godunko	Rhythmic gymnastics	Individual rope
Bronze	Vladislav Prianishnikov	Shooting	Men's 10 metre running target
Bronze	Ivan Rybovalov; Ivan Bidnyak; Serhiy Kudrya	Shooting	Men's 10 metre air pistol
Bronze	Oleksandr Zinenko; Vladislav Prianishnikov; Dmytro Yatsenko	Shooting	Men's team 10 metre running target mixed
Bronze	Yuliya Korostylova; Oxana Los; Olena Kostevych	Shooting	Women's team 25 metre pistol
Bronze	Serhiy Fesenko	Swimming	Men's 800 m freestyle
Bronze	Serhiy Breus	Swimming	Men's 100 m butterfly
Bronze	Andriy Oliynyk; Valeriy Dymo; Serhiy Breus; Yuriy Yehoshyn	Swimming	Men's 4x100 m medley relay

== See also ==
- Ukraine at the 2007 Winter Universiade
