= Ukraine national student football team =

National association football team

Ukraine
- Nickname(s): Zhovto-Blakytni (the Yellow-Blues)
- Association: Football Federation of Ukraine
- Confederation: UEFA (Europe)
- Head coach: Anatoliy Buznik; Stepan Yurchyshyn (assistant)
- FIFA code: UKR
First colours
Second colours
Medal record
Men's football
Representing Ukraine
Summer Universiade
Gold medal – first place	2007 Bangkok	Men's
Gold medal – first place	2009 Belgrade	Men's
Silver medal – second place	2001 Beijing	Men's

The Ukraine student football team represents Ukraine in international student football competitions and is controlled by the FFU, the governing body for football in Ukraine, and sports section of the Ministry of Education.

== History ==
Until fall of the Soviet Union in 1991, Ukrainian student footballers had chance to compete at Universiades as part of the Soviet Union football team. The Soviet football team debuted at the 1987 Universiades and won the tournament. It was based primarily on the Vilnius team of FK Zalgiris (all Lithuanian team).

The Ukraine student football team debuted in 1995 in Japan. The team was mainly based on FC CSKA Kyiv (not to be confused with its other contemporary FC CSKA-Borysfen Kyiv) that was recently promoted to the 1995–96 Ukrainian Second League. The team was led by Volodymyr Lozynskyi and Volodymyr Bezsonov reached semifinal where it lost and later for the third place it also yielded to Russia student football team (based on FC KAMAZ Naberezhnye Chelny). The Ukrainian forward Pavlo Matviychenko with 5 goal tallies became the top scorer of the tournament in Japan.

In 1997 the team departed under leadership of former Soviet international footballer and Ukrainian head coach Anatoliy Konkov who had on his team such Ukrainian footballers like Anatoliy Tymoshchuk, Andriy Vorobey, Andrei Karyaka, as well as Serhiy Perkhun. The team however did not disclose its full potential by placing fourth repeating achievement of the previous Bezsonov-Lozynskyi's squad.

To the 1999 tournament the team was formed by Viktor Zhylin and was based on FC Systema-Boreks Borodianka that was managed by Zhylin at that time.

In 2001 the team led by Anatoliy Buznik won its first medals when in final game Ukraine lost to the team of Japan. The Ukraine student football team of Buznik was also helped by Ihor Yakubovskyi and consisted of following players

- Goalkeepers: Dmytro Kozachenko (Nafkom-Akademia Irpin), Vadym Zhukov (Olkom Melitopol)
- Defenders: Vasyl Hrechanyi (Podillia Khmelnytskyi), Yevhen Bredun, Oleh Shkred (both Shakhtar Donetsk), Dmytro Kondratovych (Dnipro Dnipropetrovsk), Andriy Yerokhin (Chornomorets Odesa)
- Midfielders: Vitaliy Bielikov (Dnipro Dnipropetrovsk), Serhiy Klyuchyk (Kryvbas Kryvyi Rih), Oleksandr Batrachenko, Ivan Oleksiyenko (both Metalurh Zaporizhia), Volodymyr Brayila (Metalurh Mariopol), Dmytro Bermudes (Metalist Kharkiv)
- Forwards: Oleksandr Antonenko, Ivan Kozoriz (both Systema-Boreks Borodyanka), Oleksiy Telyatnykov (Dnipro Dnipropetrovsk), Myroslav Bundash (FC Zakarpattia Uzhhorod), Yaroslav Skydan (Shakhtar Donetsk)

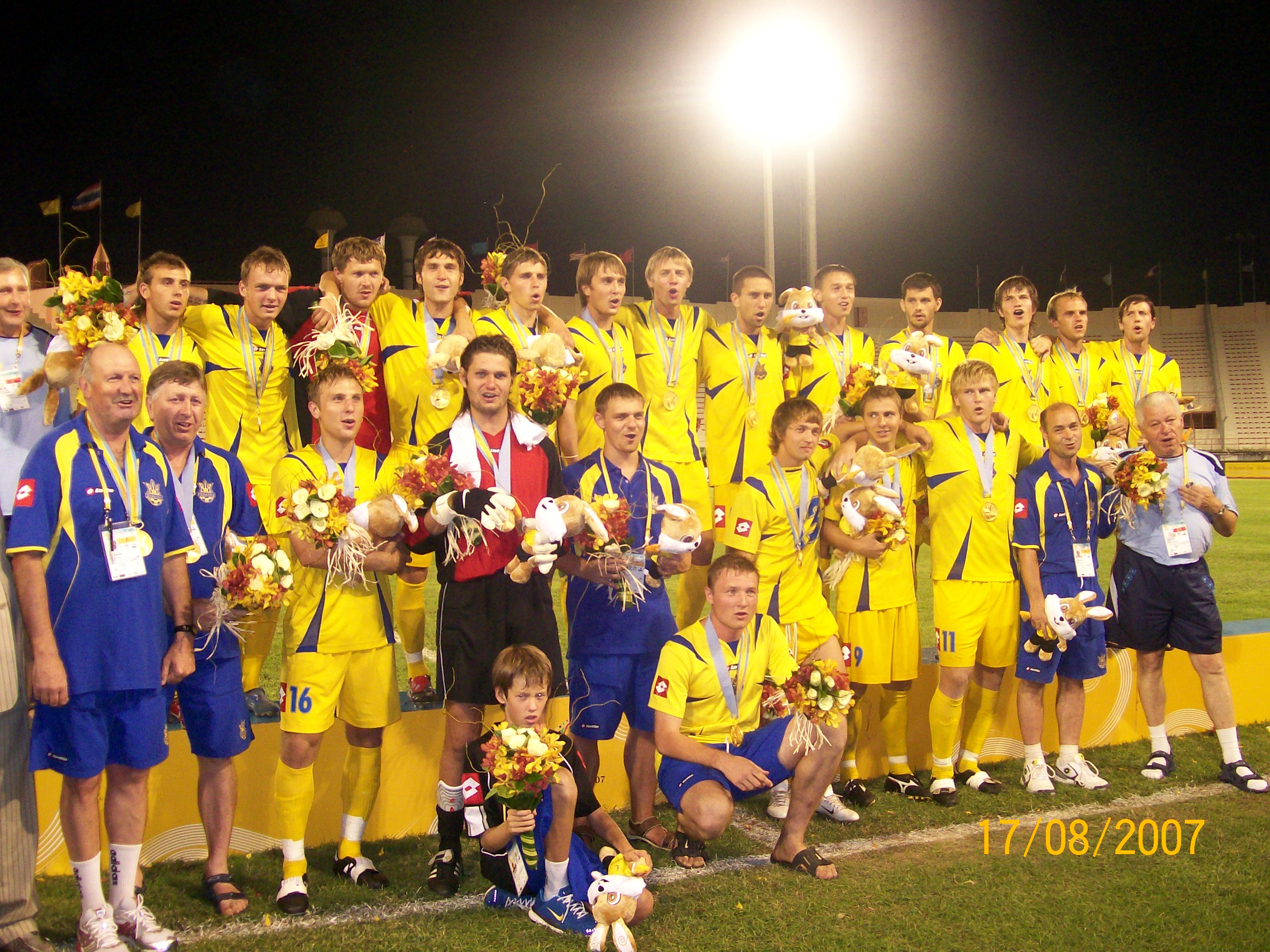
The 2007 Summer Universiade

The winning squads of 2007 and 2009 tournaments were led by Volodymyr Lozynskyi and assisted by Ivan Shepelenko. The 2007 consisted of following players

- Goalkeepers: Volodymyr Ikonnykov (Prykarpattia Ivano-Frankivsk), Artem Shtanko (Illichivets Mariupol)
- Defenders: Andriy Zaporozhan (Enerhetyk Burshtyn), Anton Monakhov (Krymteplytsia Molodizhne), Roman Bochkur (Chornomorets Odesa), Andriy Bashlay (Dynamo Kyiv)
- Midfielders: Artem Starhorodskyi (Arsenal Kyiv), Roman Voynarovskyi (Krymteplytsia Molodizhne), Andriy Misyaylo (Illichivets Mariupol), Ihor Hordya (Dnipro Dnipropetrovsk), Dmytro Pronevych (Dnipro Cherkasy), Roman Lutsenko (MFC Mykolaiv), Mykola Revutskyi (Prykarpattia Ivano-Frankivsk), Vadym Hostiev (Podillya Khmelnytskyi), Oleh Herasymyuk (Dynamo Kyiv)
- Forwards: Ihor Khudobyak (Prykarpattia Ivano-Frankivsk), Andriy Shevchuk (PFC Sevastopol), Dmytro Hunchenko (Illichivets Mariupol)

The 2009 consisted of following players

- Goalkeepers: Yuriy Bakhtiyarov (Bukovyna Chernivtsi), Yuriy Kyslytsia (Feniks-Illichovets Kalinine)
- Defenders: Vladyslav Piskun, Andriy Bashlay (both PFC Sevastopol), Anton Monakhov (Tavriya Simferopol), Ihor Hrebynskyi (Prykarpattia Ivano-Frankivsk), Andriy Zaporozhan (PFC Oleksandriya)
- Midfielders: Oleksiy Repa, Artem Starhorodskyi (both Arsenal Kyiv), Vladyslav Mykulyak (Zakarpattia Uzhhorod), Oleksandr Krokhmalyuk (CSKA Kyiv), Ihor Hordya (Metalurh Donetsk), Andriy Misyaylo (Vorskla Poltava), Mykola Revutskyi (Prykarpattia Ivano-Frankivsk), Vasyl Chornyi (Nyva Ternopil)
- Forwards: Ihor Khudobyak (Prykarpattia Ivano-Frankivsk), Andriy Shevchuk (PFC Sevastopol), Dmytro Hunchenko (Illichivets Mariupol), Matviy Bobal (Tavriya Simferopol)

On 17 August 2018 there first gathered Ukraine national female student football team for the 2019 Universiade preparation. The head coach of the team was appointed the head coach of Ukraine women's national football team Natalya Zinchenko.

== Competitive record ==
=== Universiade ===
Summer Universiade
Year	Round	Pld	W	D	L	GS	GA	Dif	Pts
1979-1991	part of the Soviet Union								
(Mexico) 1979	did not enter (unofficial)								
(Romania) 1981	no tournament								
(Canada) 1983	no tournament								
(Japan) 1985	did not enter								
(Socialist Federal Republic of Yugoslavia) 1987	part of the Soviet Union								
(West Germany) 1989	no tournament								
(England) 1991	part of the Soviet Union								
(United States) 1993	did not enter								
(Japan) 1995	Semifinals	6	2	2	2	9	11	-2	8
(Italy) 1997	Semifinals	6	2	3	1	5	3	+2	9
(Spain) 1999	Group stage	6	2	2	2	10	11	-1	8
(China) 2001	Final	6	4	0	2	4	3	+1	12
(South Korea) 2003	Group stage	6	3	1	2	13	5	+8	10
(Turkey) 2005	did not qualify								
(Thailand) 2007	Winners	5	5	0	0	11	4	+7	15
(Serbia) 2009	Winners	6	2	4	0	7	5	+2	10
(China) 2011	Group stage	6	2	1	3	6	7	-1	7
(Russia) 2013	Quarterfinals	6	2	1	3	8	11	-3	7
(South Korea) 2015	Group stage	6	1	2	3	7	13	-6	5
(Chinese Taipei) 2017	Quarterfinals	6	3	0	3	8	10	-3	9
(Italy) 2019	Quarterfinals	5	2	1	2	5	6	-1	7
Total	2 titles	70	30	17	23	93	89	+4	107

== Last games ==
=== Group B ===
5 July 2019
18:00

Ukraine	0–2	Italy
	Report	Mercadante 38'; Strada 43'

Stadio Simonetta Lamberti
Referee: Julian Weinberger (Austria)
7 July 2019
18:00

Ukraine	1–0	Mexico
Kostyshyn 75'	Report

Stadio Marcello Torre
Referee: Luis Quiroz Prado (Ecuador)

=== Quarterfinals ===
9 July 2019
21:00 CEST

Brazil	2–1	Ukraine
R. Dos Santos 80'; Milioransa 90'	Report	Kostyshyn 9'

Arena di Cercola Stadium, Naples
Referee: Rohit Saggi (Norway)

=== 5th–8th place semifinals ===
11 July 2019
17:00 CEST

Republic of Ireland	1–2	Ukraine
Hollywood 67'	Report	Doroshenko 56'; Udod 90+1'

Stadio San Francesco d'Assisi, Nocera Inferiore
Referee: Yusuke Araki (Japan)

=== Fifth place match ===
13 July 2019
17:00 CEST

Ukraine	1–1	South Korea
Radchenko 45'	Report	Kim Hyeon-woo 60'
Penalties
	1–3

Stadio Alberto Pinto, Caserta
Referee: Luis Quiroz (Ecuador)

== Current squad ==
Squad as of 01 July 2019

No.	Pos.	Player	Date of birth (age)	Caps	Club
1	GK	Vadym Soldatenko (Captain)	28 May 1996 (age 30)		(Ukraine) Avanhard Kramatorsk
12	GK	Artem Pospyelov	11 January 1998 (age 28)		(Ukraine) Mariupol
15	DF	Oleksiy Lobov	16 August 1997 (age 29)		(Ukraine) Avanhard Kramatorsk
5	DF	Dmytro Yukhymovych	27 July 1996 (age 30)		(Ukraine) Ahrobiznes Volochysk
4	DF	Bohdan Kushnirenko	2 November 1995 (age 31)		(Ukraine) Mykolaiv
3	DF	Andriy Spivakov	15 May 1995 (age 31)		(Ukraine) Berkut-Lehion Brovary
20	DF	Ernest Astakhov	21 August 1998 (age 28)		(Ukraine) Kremin Kremenchuk
2	DF	Oleh Sokolov	12 July 1999 (age 27)		(Ukraine) Oleksandriya
16	MF	Roman Tolochko	25 October 1998 (age 28)		(Ukraine) Karpaty Lviv
8	MF	Maksym Hrysyo	14 May 1996 (age 30)		(Ukraine) Karpaty Lviv
7	MF	Taras Zaviyskyi	12 April 1995 (age 31)		(Germany) Buchonia Flieden
6	MF	Andriy Ponedelnik	28 February 1997 (age 29)		(Ukraine) Bukovyna Chernivtsi
14	MF	Artur Dumanyuk	15 November 1996 (age 29)		(Ukraine) Ahrobiznes Volochysk
13	MF	Arsentiy Doroshenko	27 June 2000 (age 26)		(Ukraine) Kolos Kovalivka
9	MF	Artem Radchenko	2 January 1995 (age 31)		(Ukraine) Mykolaiv
10	MF	Yevhen Chumak	25 August 1995 (age 31)		(Georgia (country)) Shevardeni-1906 Tbilisi
18	MF	Denys Kostyshyn	31 August 1997 (age 29)		(Ukraine) Kolos Kovalivka
17	FW	Andriy Shtohrin	14 December 1998 (age 27)		(Ukraine) Chornomorets Odesa
19	FW	Mykhaylo Udod	17 February 1997 (age 29)		Unattached
11	FW	Anatoliy Nuriyev	20 May 1996 (age 30)		(Ukraine) Mynai

== Coaching staff ==
- Head coach: Anatoliy Buznyk
- Assistant: Stepan Yurchyshyn
- Assistant: Oleksiy Yatsenko

=== Former coaches ===
- 1995 Bezsonov & Volodymyr Lozynskyi
- 1997 Anatoliy Konkov
- 1999 Viktor Zhylin
- 2001 Anatoliy Buznyk
- 2003 Anatoliy Buznyk
- 2007 Volodymyr Lozynskyi
- 2009 Volodymyr Lozynskyi
- 2011 Volodymyr Lozynskyi
- 2013 Volodymyr Lozynskyi
- 2015 Volodymyr Lozynskyi
- 2017 Anatoliy Buznyk
- 2019 Anatoliy Buznyk

== Top scorers ==
Since 2009

- Anton Kotlyar – 6
- Serhiy Kravchenko – 4
- Alisher Yakubov – 2
- Ihor Kurylo – 2
- Vladyslav Piskun – 2

== Achievements ==
- Football at the Summer Universiade
  - Winners (2): 2007, 2009 (details)
  - Runners-up (1): 2001

== See also ==
- Volodymyr Lozynskyi
- Burevestnik (Ukraine), Soviet students sports society
