= Ukraine at the 2009 Summer Universiade =

- IOC code: UKR

in Belgrade 1 — 12 July 2009
- Competitors: 162 in 13 sports
- Medals Ranked 6th: Gold 7 Silver 11 Bronze 13 Total 31

Summer Universiade appearances (overview)
- 1993; 1995; 1997; 1999; 2001; 2003; 2005; 2007; 2009; 2011; 2013; 2015; 2017; 2019; 2021; 2025; 2027

Ukraine competed at the 2009 Summer Universiade in Belgrade, Serbia, from 1 to 12 July 2009. 162 athletes formed the Ukrainian team. They competed in archery, athletics, basketball, diving, fencing, football, gymnastics, judo, swimming, table tennis, taekwondo, tennis, and volleyball. The only sport Ukraine did not participate in was water polo. Ukraine won 31 medals, including 7 gold medals, and ranked 6th.

== Medal summary ==
=== Medal by sports ===
Medals by sport
Sport	1st place, gold medalist(s)	2nd place, silver medalist(s)	3rd place, bronze medalist(s)	Total
Fencing	2	0	1	3
Swimming	2	0	0	2
Archery	1	2	1	4
Diving	1	1	3	5
Football	1	0	0	1
Rhythmic gymnastics	0	5	2	7
Tennis	0	2	1	3
Athletics	0	1	2	3
Artistic gymnastics	0	0	1	1
Judo	0	0	1	1
Table tennis	0	0	1	1
Total	7	11	13	31

=== Medalists ===
Medal	Name	Sport	Event
Gold	Viktor Ruban	Archery	Men's individual recurve
Gold	Olena Kryvytska; Olha Petriuk; Anfisa Pochkalova; Yana Shemyakina	Fencing	Women's team épée
Gold	Olha Kiseleva; Olena Voronina; Iryna Kravchuk; Nina Kozlova	Fencing	Women's team sabre
Gold	Kostyantyn Milyayev	Diving	Men's 10 m platform
Gold	Yuriy Bakhtiyarov; Andriy Zaporozhan; Vladyslav Piskun; Oleksiy Repa; Ihor Herbynsky; Andriy Bashlay; Artem Starhorodsky; Mykola Revutsky; Ihor Hordia; Dmytro Hunchenko; Ihor Khudobiak; Yuriy Kysylytsia; Andriy Shevchuk; Andriy Mysiaylo; Oleksandr Krokhmaliuk; Vladyslav Mykuliak; Matviy Bobal; Anton Monakhov; Vasyl Chorny	Football	Men's team
Gold	Ihor Borysyk	Swimming	Men's 100 m breaststroke
Gold	Ihor Borysyk	Swimming	Men's 200 m breaststroke
Silver	Tetyana Dorokhova; Viktoriya Koval; Olena Kushniruk	Archery	Women's team recurve
Silver	Dmytro Hrachov; Viktoriya Koval	Archery	Mixed team recurve
Silver	Vira Rebryk	Athletics	Women's javelin throw
Silver	Oleksiy Pryhorov; Illya Kvasha	Diving	Men's synchronized 3 m springboard
Silver	Anna Bessonova	Rhythmic gymnastics	Women's individual all-around
Silver	Anna Bessonova	Rhythmic gymnastics	Women's ball
Silver	Anna Bessonova	Rhythmic gymnastics	Women's ribbon
Silver	Anna Bessonova	Rhythmic gymnastics	Women's rope
Silver	Iryna Kovalchuk; Vira Perederii; Olena Dmytrash; Oksana Petulko; Olha Tsolha; Vita Zubchenko	Rhythmic gymnastics	Women's groups 3 ribbons + 2 ropes
Silver	Ivan Serhiyiv	Tennis	Men's singles
Silver	Ivan Serhiyiv; Artem Smirnov	Tennis	Men's team
Bronze	Dmytro Hrachov	Archery	Men's individual recurve
Bronze	Oleksiy Sokyrskyy	Athletics	Men's hammer throw
Bronze	Kateryna Karsak	Athletics	Women's discus throw
Bronze	Yuriy Shlyakhov	Diving	Men's 1 m springboard
Bronze	Illya Kvasha	Diving	Men's 3 m springboard
Bronze	Yulia Prokopchuk	Diving	Women's 10 m platform
Bronze	Anatoliy Herey; Ihor Reyzlin; Vitaly Medvedev; Maksym Khvorost	Fencing	Men's team épée
Bronze	Dariya Zgoba	Artistic gymnastics	Women's balance beam
Bronze	Iryna Kovalchuk; Vira Perederii; Olena Dmytrash; Oksana Petulko; Olha Tsolha; Vita Zubchenko	Rhythmic gymnastics	Women's groups all-around
Bronze	Iryna Kovalchuk; Vira Perederii; Olena Dmytrash; Oksana Petulko; Olha Tsolha; Vita Zubchenko	Rhythmic gymnastics	Women's groups 5 hoops
Bronze	Svitlana Iaromka	Judo	Women's +78 kg
Bronze	Oleksandr Didukh	Table tennis	Men's singles
Bronze	Artem Smirnov	Tennis	Men's singles

== See also ==
- Ukraine at the 2009 Winter Universiade
