= Football at the 2017 Summer Universiade – Men's tournament =

Men's football at the XXIX Summer Universiade

Tournament details
- Dates: 18–29 August 2017
- Teams: 16 (from 5 confederations)
- Venue: 4

Final positions
- Champions: Japan (6th title)
- Runners-up: France
- Third place: Mexico
- Fourth place: Uruguay

Tournament statistics
- Matches played: 48
- Goals scored: 150 (3.13 per match)
- Top scorer(s): (Russia) Ivan Sergeyev (6 goals)

The men's tournament of football at the 2017 Summer Universiade was held from August 18 to 29 in Taipei, Taiwan.

== Teams ==
AFC	CAF	CONCACAF	CONMEBOL	UEFA
Chinese Taipei (H); Japan; Malaysia; South Korea	South Africa	Canada; Mexico; United States	Argentina; Brazil; Uruguay	France; Republic of Ireland; Italy; Russia; Ukraine

== Preliminary round ==
All times are Taiwan Standard Time (UTC+08:00).

Tiebreakers

The ranking of each team in each group was determined as follows:

1. Greatest number of points obtained in group matches;
2. Goal difference in all group matches;
3. Greatest number of goals scored in all group matches;
4. Greatest number of points obtained in group matches between the teams concerned;
5. Greatest number of goals scored in the group matches between the teams concerned;
6. Fair play points system taking into account the number of yellow and red cards in all group matches;
7. Drawing of lots by the Technical Committee.

=== Group A ===
Pos	Team	Pld	W	D	L	GF	GA	GD	Pts	Qualification
1	Mexico	3	2	1	0	5	1	+4	7	Elimination round
2	France	3	1	2	0	2	1	+1	5	Elimination round
3	Republic of Ireland	3	1	1	1	2	2	0	4	Classification round
4	Chinese Taipei (H)	3	0	0	3	1	6	−5	0	Classification round

(H) Hosts
18 August 2017
19:30

Chinese Taipei	0–3	Mexico
	Report	Treviño 9'; Garduño 48'; Quiñones 80'

Fu Jen Catholic University Stadium, New Taipei City
Referee: Ammar Ebrahim Hasan Mahfoodh (Bahrain)
18 August 2017
19:30

Republic of Ireland	0–0	France
	Report

New Taipei City Xinzhuang Stadium, New Taipei City
Referee: Yu Ming Hsun (Chinese Taipei)

21 August 2017
19:30

Chinese Taipei	0–1	France
	Report	Daniellou 3'

Fu Jen Catholic University Stadium, New Taipei City
Referee: Mahmood Salim Said Al Majarafi (Oman)
21 August 2017
19:30

Republic of Ireland	0–1	Mexico
	Report	Hernández 7'

New Taipei City Xinzhuang Stadium, New Taipei City
Referee: Timur Faizullin (Kyrgyzstan)

23 August 2017
19:30

France	1–1	Mexico
Minselebe 82'	Report	Garza Cabello 28'

New Taipei City Xinzhuang Stadium, New Taipei City
Referee: Takuto Okabe (Japan)
23 August 2017
19:30

Chinese Taipei	1–2	Republic of Ireland
Lin C.-h. 25' (pen.)	Report	O'Sullivan 72'; Doyle 90+3'

Fu Jen Catholic University Stadium, New Taipei City
Referee: Hanna Hattab(Syria)

=== Group B ===
Pos	Team	Pld	W	D	L	GF	GA	GD	Pts	Qualification
1	Japan	3	3	0	0	9	1	+8	9	Elimination round
2	Uruguay	3	2	0	1	6	2	+4	6	Elimination round
3	Canada	3	1	0	2	2	8	−6	3	Classification round
4	Malaysia	3	0	0	3	1	7	−6	0	Classification round

19 August 2017
11:00

Japan	2–0	Malaysia
Hatate 35', 41'	Report

Fu Jen Catholic University Stadium, New Taipei City
Referee: Shukri Hussain Al-Hunfush (Saudi Arabia)
19 August 2017
11:00

Uruguay	2–0	Canada
Oyenard Dupuy 80' (pen.), 90' (pen.)	Report

New Taipei City Xinzhuang Stadium, New Taipei City
Referee: Kim Woo-sung (South Korea)

21 August 2017
16:00

Japan	5–0	Canada
Nago 41'; Germain 50' (pen.), 65'; Shibato 75'; Wakizaka 90+2'	Report

Fu Jen Catholic University Stadium, New Taipei City
Referee: Ammar Ebrahim Mahfoodh (Bahrain)
21 August 2017
16:00

Uruguay	3–0	Malaysia
Theodosopoulos 10', 21'; Tais 47'	Report

Hsinchu County Second Stadium, Hsinchu County
Referee: Clifford Daypuyat (Philippines)

23 August 2017
16:00

Japan	2–1	Uruguay
Nakano 29' (pen.); Hatate 49'	Report	Oyenard Dupuy 85'

Chang Gung University Stadium, Taoyuan City
Referee: Sherzod Kasimov (Uzbekistan)
23 August 2017
16:00

Canada	2–1	Malaysia
Côté-Kougnima 4'; McMillan 61'	Report	Tumin 32'

New Taipei City Xinzhuang Stadium, New Taipei City
Referee: Yu Ming Hsun (Chinese Taipei)

=== Group C ===
Pos	Team	Pld	W	D	L	GF	GA	GD	Pts	Qualification
1	Russia	3	3	0	0	14	2	+12	9	Elimination round
2	Italy	3	2	0	1	4	3	+1	6	Elimination round
3	Brazil	3	1	0	2	7	5	+2	3	Classification round
4	United States	3	0	0	3	0	15	−15	0	Classification round

18 August 2017
19:30

Italy	2–0	United States
Chiarello 18'; Taviani 73'	Report

Chang Gung University Stadium, Taoyuan City
Referee: Sherzod Kasimov (Uzbekistan)
18 August 2017
19:30

Brazil	2–3	Russia
De Pauli 79' (pen.); Rodrigues dos Reis 88'	Report	Sergeyev 15'; Ustinov 68'; Ivashchenko 90+5'

Hsinchu County Second Stadium, Hsinchu County
Referee: Takuto Okabe (Japan)

21 August 2017
19:30

Brazil	5–0	United States
Lopes da Silva Junior 2'; De Pauli 11' (pen.); Gomes da Mata 56'; Gomes Paranaguá 67' (pen.); Rodrigues dos Reis 81'	Report

Chang Gung University Stadium, Taoyuan City
Referee: Sivakorn Pu-Udom (Thailand)
21 August 2017
19:30

Italy	0–3	Russia
	Report	Sergeyev 36', 40'; Obolsky 66'

Hsinchu County Second Stadium, Hsinchu County
Referee: Pranjal Banerjee (India)

23 August 2017
16:00

Italy	2–0	Brazil
Taviani 77'; Favo 90+4'	Report

Fu Jen Catholic University Stadium, New Taipei City
Referee: Shukri Hussain Al-Hunfush (Saudi Arabia)
23 August 2017
16:00

Russia	8–0	United States
Ivashchenko 6', 72'; Mullin 12', 30'; Minaev 36'; Pogorelov 66', 87'; Sergeyev 89'	Report

Hsinchu County Second Stadium, Hsinchu County
Referee: Mongkolchai Pechsri (Thailand)

=== Group D ===
Pos	Team	Pld	W	D	L	GF	GA	GD	Pts	Qualification
1	Argentina	3	2	0	1	5	4	+1	6	Elimination round
2	Ukraine	3	2	0	1	4	6	−2	6	Elimination round
3	South Korea	3	1	1	1	8	4	+4	4	Classification round
4	South Africa	3	0	1	2	3	6	−3	1	Classification round

19 August 2017
11:00

South Korea	1–2	Argentina
Jeong 58'	Report	Chiapello 69'; Barbieri Iribe 88'

Chang Gung University Stadium, Taoyuan City
Referee: Hanna Hattab (Syria)
19 August 2017
11:00

South Africa	0–2	Ukraine
	Report	Busko 27'; Zaviyskyi 44'

Hsinchu County Second Stadium, Hsinchu County
Referee: Mongkolchai Pechsri (Thailand)

21 August 2017
16:00

South Korea	5–0	Ukraine
Jeong 10', 73'; Lee K. 27'; Cho J. 64', 71'	Report

New Taipei City Xinzhuang Stadium, New Taipei City
Referee: Sultan Abdulrazzaq Al Marzooqi (United Arab Emirates)
21 August 2017
16:00

South Africa	1–2	Argentina
Sixishe 32' (pen.)	Report	Barbieri Iribe 7', 62'

Chang Gung University Stadium, Taoyuan City
Referee: Hussein Abo Yehia (Lebanon)

23 August 2017
19:30

South Korea	2–2	South Africa
Doo 45+2', 46'	Report	Mabitsela 36'; Maphanga 85'

Chang Gung University Stadium, Taoyuan City
Referee: Bijan Heidari (Iran)
23 August 2017
19:30

Ukraine	2–1	Argentina
Kotlyar 16', 58'	Report	Barbieri Iribe 47'

Hsinchu County Second Stadium, Hsinchu County
Referee: Ammar Ebrahim Hasan Mahfoodh (Bahrain)

== Classification round ==
13th place
Republic of Ireland	1
Malaysia	0
15th place
United States	2
Chinese Taipei	1

13th–16th place semifinals
A3	Republic of Ireland	4
C4	United States	1
A4	Chinese Taipei	2 (2)
B4	Malaysia (p)	2 (3)

9th–16th place quarterfinals
A3	Republic of Ireland	0
D4	South Africa	3
B3	Canada	2
C4	United States	0
A4	Chinese Taipei	0
D3	South Korea	6
B4	Malaysia	1
C3	Brazil	3

9th–12th place semifinals
D4	South Africa	1
B3	Canada	2
D3	South Korea	3 (7)
C3	Brazil (p)	3 (8)

9th place
Canada	3
Brazil	4
11th place
South Africa	0
South Korea	3

=== 9th–16th place quarterfinals ===
25 August 2017
16:00

Republic of Ireland	0–3	South Africa
	Report	Baloyi 16'; Dudula 34' (pen.); Nkebe 86'

Fu Jen Catholic University Stadium, New Taipei City
Referee: Mahmood Salim Said Al Majarafi (Oman)
25 August 2017
16:00

Chinese Taipei	0–6	South Korea
	Report	Lee H. 13', 50'; Jo 45'; Doo 55'; Min 71', 82'

New Taipei City Xinzhuang Stadium, New Taipei City
Referee: Hussein Abo Yehia (Lebanon)
25 August 2017
16:00

Canada	2–0	United States
Kouo Dibongue 4', 44'	Report

Chang Gung University Stadium, Taoyuan City
Referee: Timur Faizullin (Kyrgyzstan)
25 August 2017
16:00

Malaysia	1–3	Brazil
Tumin 55'	Report	De Pauli Oliveira 72', 90+2'; De Sousa Neto 76'

Hsinchu County Second Stadium, Hsinchu County
Referee: Kim Woo-sung (South Korea)

=== 13th–16th place semifinals ===
27 August 2017
16:00

Chinese Taipei	2–2	Malaysia
Lee 17'; Chen H. 58'	Report	Abdul Ghani 43', 90+3'
Penalties
	2–3

New Taipei City Xinzhuang Stadium, New Taipei City
Referee: Clifford Daypuyat (Philippines)
27 August 2017
16:00

Republic of Ireland	4–1	United States
O'Sullivan 7', 66', 86'; Kinneen 90+1'	Report	Phillips 47'

Chang Gung University Stadium, Taoyuan City
Referee: Yu Ming-hsun (Chinese Taipei)

=== 9th–12th place semifinals ===
27 August 2017
16:00

South Africa	1–2	Canada
Sixishe 45'	Report	Rajkovic 68', 86' (pen.)

Hsinchu County Second Stadium, Hsinchu County
Referee: Sivakorn Pu-udom (Thailand)
27 August 2017
16:00

South Korea	3–3	Brazil
Cho J. 27'; Lee K. 74', 88'	Report	Araujo Costa 10', 64'; Silva Rocha 29'
Penalties
Doo Hyeon-seok (penalty missed); Cho Jae-wan (penalty scored); Lee Keun-ho (penalty scored); Park Sung-woo (penalty missed); Kang Ji-hun (penalty scored); Yu Jeon-gwan (penalty scored); Lee Si-young (penalty scored); Lee Sang-min (penalty scored); Jeong Tae-wook (penalty scored); Song Bum-keun (penalty missed)	7–8	(penalty scored) Daniel Oliveira; (penalty scored) Joao Paranagua; (penalty scored) Matheus Rezende; (penalty missed) Pedro de Sousa; (penalty missed) Tiago Rodrigues; (penalty scored) Joao Ladeia; (penalty scored) Guilherme Silva; (penalty scored) Gustavo Coelho; (penalty scored) Joao de Almeida; (penalty scored) Enzo de Mattos

Fu Jen Catholic University Stadium, New Taipei City
Referee: Pranjal Banerjee (India)

=== 15th place match ===
29 August 2017
16:00

Chinese Taipei	1–2	United States
Lee 6'	Report	McLaughlin 44'; Fordham 67'

New Taipei City Xinzhuang Stadium, New Taipei City
Referee: Kim Woo-sung (South Korea)

=== 13th place match ===
29 August 2017
16:00

Malaysia	0–1	Republic of Ireland
	Report	O'Sullivan 64'

Chang Gung University Stadium, Taoyuan City
Referee: Timur Faizullin (Kyrgyzstan)

=== 11th place match ===
29 August 2017
16:00

South Africa	0–3	South Korea
	Report	Cho J. 7'; Lee K. 54'; Kang 74'

Hsinchu County Second Stadium, Hsinchu County
Referee: Takuto Okabe (Japan)

=== 9th place match ===
29 August 2017
19:30

Canada	3–4	Brazil
MacNaughton 2'; Park 7'; MacMillan 63'	Report	Sabino da Silva 4'; De Pauli Oliveira 30' (pen.); Silva Rocha 34'; Rodrigues dos Reis 86'

Chang Gung University Stadium, Taoyuan City
Referee: Hussein Abo Yehia (Lebanon)

== Elimination round ==
5th place
C2	Italy	5
C1	Russia	2
7th place
D2	Ukraine	2
D1	Argentina	0

5th–8th place semifinals
D2	Ukraine	1
C2	Italy	2
D1	Argentina	0
C1	Russia	4

Quarterfinals
A1	Mexico	2
D2	Ukraine	0
B1	Japan	6
C2	Italy	0
A2	France (p)	0 (5)
D1	Argentina	0 (3)
B2	Uruguay	1
C1	Russia	0

Semifinals
A1	Mexico	1
B1	Japan	3
A2	France (p)	0 (5)
B2	Uruguay	0 (4)

Final
B1	Japan	1
A2	France	0
Third place
A1	Mexico	0 (5)
B2	Uruguay	0 (3)

=== Quarterfinals ===
25 August 2017
19:30

Mexico	2–0	Ukraine
Hütt 3'; León 88'	Report

Fu Jen Catholic University Stadium, New Taipei City
Referee: Pranjal Banerjee (India)
25 August 2017
19:30

France	0–0	Argentina
	Report
Penalties
Sanson (penalty scored); Valera (penalty scored); Denis (penalty scored); Thibault (penalty scored); Cognard (penalty scored)	5–3	(penalty scored) Barbieri Iribe; (penalty scored) Chiapello; (penalty scored) Yorio; (penalty missed) Escalante

New Taipei City Xinzhuang Stadium, New Taipei City
Referee: Sultan Abdulrazzaq Al Marzooqi (United Arab Emirates)
25 August 2017
19:30

Japan	6–0	Italy
Koike 3'; Kikuchi 10'; Wakizaka 17', 44'; Toshima 40'; Germain 52'	Report

Chang Gung University Stadium, Taoyuan City
Referee: Bijan Heidari (Iran)
25 August 2017
19:30

Uruguay	1–0	Russia
Oyenard Dupuy 76'	Report

Hsinchu County Second Stadium, Hsinchu County
Referee: Sivakorn Pu-udom (Thailand)

=== 5th–8th place semifinals ===
27 August 2017
19:30

Ukraine	1–2	Italy
Yakubov 80'	Report	Chiarello 21'; Rocchi 84'

New Taipei City Xinzhuang Stadium, New Taipei City
Referee: Ammar Ebrahim Mahfoodh (Bahrain)
27 August 2017
19:30

Argentina	0–4	Russia
	Report	Minayev 32'; Pogorelov 57'; Obolsky 82', 90+1'

Chang Gung University Stadium, Taoyuan City
Referee: Bijan Heidari (Iran)

=== Semifinals ===
27 August 2017
19:30

Mexico	1–3	Japan
Cruz Armenta 58'	Report	Mitoma 45+1' (pen.); Nakano 50'; Wakizaka 76'

Hsinchu County Second Stadium, Hsinchu County
Referee: Shukri Hussain Al-Hunfush (Saudi Arabia)
27 August 2017
19:30

France	0–0	Uruguay
	Report
Penalties
Sanson (penalty scored); Feneuil (penalty scored); Denis (penalty scored); Thibault (penalty missed); Cognard (penalty scored); Gostisbehere (penalty scored)	5–4	(penalty scored) Oyenard; (penalty scored) Christophersen; (penalty scored) Tais; (penalty missed) Tejera; (penalty scored) Espinosa; (penalty missed) Rodríguez

Fu Jen Catholic University Stadium, New Taipei City
Referee: Mahmood Salim Said Al Majarafi (Oman)

=== 7th place match ===
29 August 2017
19:30

Ukraine	2–0	Argentina
Yakubov 31'; Kotlyar 69'	Report

New Taipei City Xinzhuang Stadium, New Taipei City
Referee: Hanna Hattab (Syria)

=== 5th place match ===
29 August 2017
19:30

Italy	5–2	Russia
Maestrelli 29'; Favo 31'; Rocchi 78'; Cioè 82'; Taviani 88'	Report	Sergeyev 12', 69'

Hsinchu County Second Stadium, Hsinchu County
Referee: Sultan Abdulrazzaq Al Marzooqi (United Arab Emirates)

=== Bronze medal match ===
29 August 2017
16:00

Mexico	0–0	Uruguay
	Report
Penalties
Hütt (penalty scored); Fernández (penalty scored); Méndez (penalty scored); Quiñones (penalty scored); Treviño (penalty scored)	5–3	(penalty scored) Oyenard; (penalty scored) Christophersen; (penalty scored) Tais; (penalty missed) Garella

Fu Jen Catholic University Stadium, New Taipei City
Referee: Sherzod Kasimov (Uzbekistan)

=== Gold medal match ===
29 August 2017
20:00

Japan	1–0	France
Germain 27'	Report

Fu Jen Catholic University Stadium, New Taipei City
Referee: Pranjal Banerjee (India)

== Final standings ==
Place	Team	W–D–L
1st place, gold medalist(s)	Japan	6–0–0
2nd place, silver medalist(s)	France	1–4–1
3rd place, bronze medalist(s)	Mexico	3–2–1
4	Uruguay	3–2–1
5	Italy	4–0–2
6	Russia	4–0–2
7	Ukraine	3–0–3
8	Argentina	2–1–3
9	Brazil	3–1–2
10	Canada	3–0–3
11	South Korea	3–2–1
12	South Africa	1–1–4
13	Republic of Ireland	3–1–2
14	Malaysia	0–1–5
15	United States	1–0–5
16	Chinese Taipei	0–1–5
