= Volodymyr Lozynskyi =

Ukrainian footballer (1955–2020)

Personal information
- Full name: Volodymyr Fedorovych Lozynskyi
- Date of birth: 6 January 1955
- Place of birth: Sopychi, Bryansk Oblast, USSR
- Date of death: 17 July 2020 (aged 65)
- Place of death: Kyiv, Ukraine
- Height: 1.81 m (5 ft 11 in)
- Position: Defender

Youth career
- 1972–1975: Dynamo Kyiv

Senior career*
Years	Team	Apps	(Gls)
1976–1984	Dynamo Kyiv	225	(9)
1985–1986	Metalist Kharkiv	62	(1)
1987	SKA Kyiv	2	(0)
1987	Kryvbas Kryvyi Rih	38	(2)
1988–1990	Kremin Kremenchuk	73	(2)
1993	Budivelnyk Brovary (amateurs)	7	(0)

International career
1979–1982	USSR	4	(0)

Managerial career
- 1990–1991: Kremin Kremenchuk (assistant)
- 1991–1992: Kremin Kremenchuk
- 1994–1996: CSKA Kyiv
- 1996–1997: CSKA Kyiv (former CSKA-Borysfen)
- 1997–1998: CSKA-2 Kyiv
- 1998–2001: CSKA Kyiv (assistant)
- 2000–2003: CSKA Kyiv
- 2003–2004: Vorskla-Naftohaz Poltava
- 2005–2006: Boyarka-2006 Boyarka (sporting director)
- 2007–2010: Dynamo Kyiv (scout)
- 2007–2016: Ukraine students
- * Club domestic league appearances and goals

Volodymyr Fedorovych Lozynskyi (Ukrainian: Володимир Федорович Лозинський; Russian: Владимир Фёдорович Лозинский; 6 January 1955 – 17 July 2020) was a Soviet and Ukrainian football player and coach.

== Honours ==
- Soviet Top League winner: 1977, 1980, 1981.
- Soviet Cup winner: 1978, 1982.

== International career ==
Lozynskyi made his debut for USSR on 14 October 1979 in a friendly against Romania. He played in the 1982 FIFA World Cup qualifiers, but was not selected for the final tournament squad. He also played in one UEFA Euro 1984 qualifier.

In 1979 Lozynskyi played a couple of games for Ukraine at the Spartakiad of the Peoples of the USSR.
