= Ihor Khudobyak =

Ihor Khudobyak may refer to:

- Ihor Khudobyak (footballer, born 1985), Ukrainian footballer
- Ihor Khudobyak (footballer, born 1987), Ukrainian footballer
