= Football at the 2007 Summer Universiade =

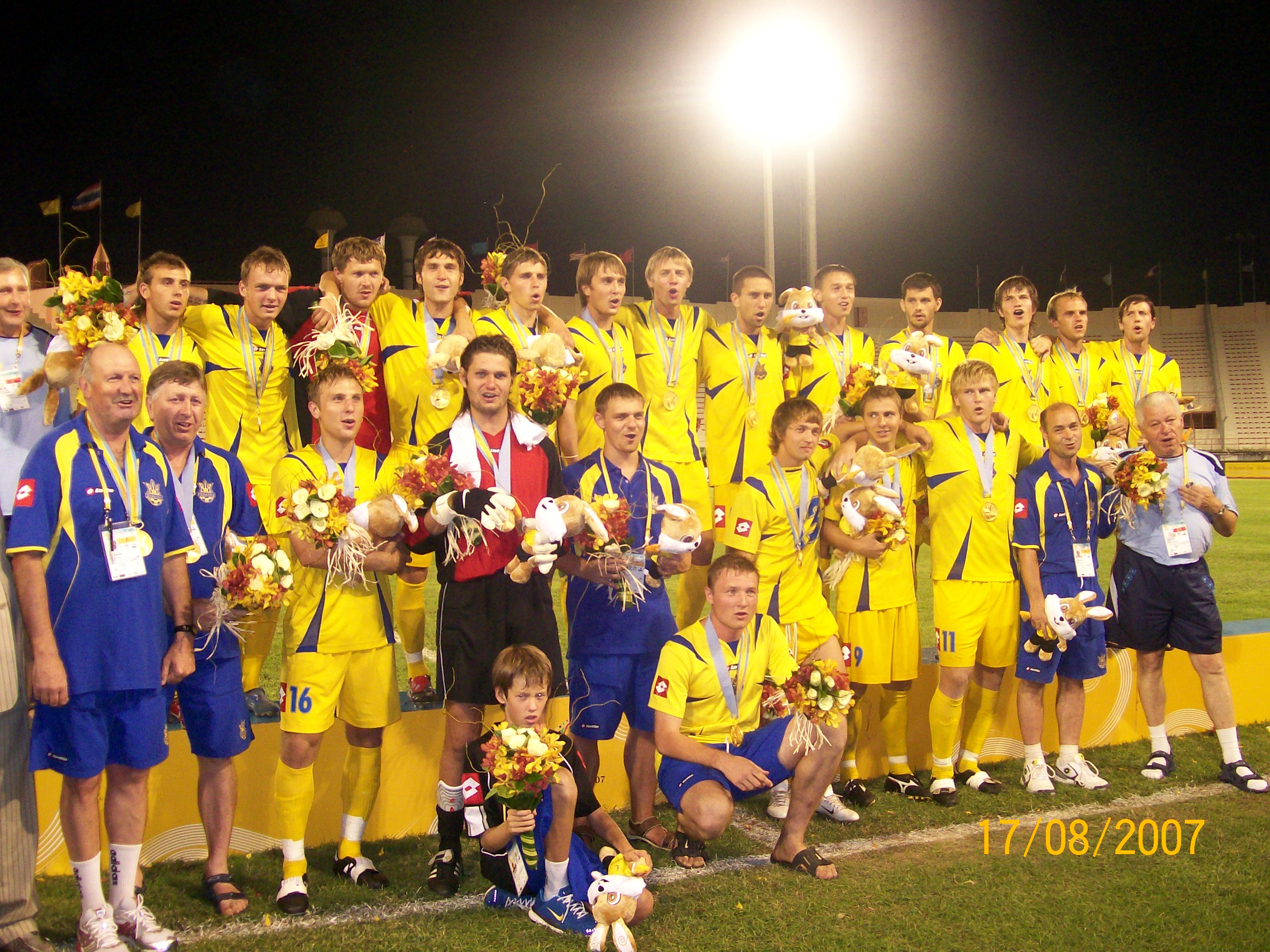
Ukraine

Football events were contested at the 2007 Summer Universiade in Bangkok, Thailand.

== Venues ==
Bangkok
Rajamangala Stadium	Supachalasai Stadium	Thai Army Sports Stadium	Ramkhamhaeng University Stadium
Capacity: 49,722	Capacity: 20,000	Capacity: 20,000	Capacity: 6,000
Bangkok	Pathum Thani		Nakhon Nayok
Insee Chantarasatit Stadium	Bangkok University Stadium	RMUTT Stadium	Srinakharinwirot University Stadium
Capacity: 4,000	Capacity: 3,000	Capacity: 2,000	Capacity: 2,000
Football at the 2007 Summer Universiade is located in Thailand

== Final standing ==
Event	Gold	Silver	Bronze
Men's football	Ukraine; Volodymyr Ikonnykov; Artem Shtanko; Andriy Zaporozhan; Anton Monakhov; Roman Bochkur; Andriy Bashlay; Artem Starhorodskyi; Roman Voynarovskyi; Andriy Misyaylo; Ihor Hordya; Dmytro Pronevych; Roman Lutsenko; Mykola Revutskyi; Vadym Hostyev; Oleh Herasymyuk; Ihor Khudobyak; Andriy Shevchuk; Dmytro Hunchenko	Italy (ITA)	Thailand (THA); Umarin Yaodam; Chatchai Budprom; Panupong Wongsa; Nakarin Fuplook; Thritthi Nonsrichai; Wisarut Pannasri; Weerayut Jitkuntod; Jeera Jarernsuk; Kittipol Paphunga; Jakkaphan Kaewprom; Sumanya Purisai; Adisak Ganu; Apipoo Suntornpanavej; Wuttichai Tathong; Ekaphan Inthasen; Anon Sangsanoi; Sompong Soleb
Women's football	North Korea (PRK)	Russia (RUS)	Brazil (BRA)
