= Lee Keun-ho =

Lee Keun-ho may refer to:

- Lee Keun-ho (footballer, born 1985), South Korean footballer
- Lee Keun-ho (footballer, born 1993), South Korean footballer
- Lee Keun-ho (footballer, born 1996), South Korean footballer
