= Shooting at the 2007 Summer Universiade =

Shooting competition

Shooting at the XXIV Summer Universiade
- Dates: August 10, 2007 – August 13, 2007

Shooting was contested at the 2007 Summer Universiade from August 10 to 13 in Bangkok, Thailand.

== Medals table ==
Rank	Nation	Gold	Silver	Bronze	Total
1	Russia	10	5	8	23
2	China	9	3	6	18
3	Germany	4	3	3	10
4	Ukraine	3	5	4	12
5	Thailand	2	2	3	7
6	Italy	2	2	1	5
7	South Korea	1	5	4	10
8	Kazakhstan	1	2	1	4
9	Slovakia	1	1	2	4
10	Cyprus	1	1	0	2
11	India	1	0	1	2
12	Czech Republic	1	0	0	1
12	Hungary	1	0	0	1
14	Poland	0	3	2	5
15	Austria	0	1	0	1
15	France	0	1	0	1
15	Great Britain	0	1	0	1
15	Mongolia	0	1	0	1
15	Serbia	0	1	0	1
20	Belarus	0	0	1	1
20	Chinese Taipei	0	0	1	1
Totals (21 entries)		37	37	37	111

== Medal summary ==
=== Men's events ===
==== Individual ====
Event	Gold	Silver	Bronze
10 metre air pistol	Leonid Yekimov; Russia	Ha Gil-yong; South Korea	Lee Dae-myung; South Korea
10 metre air rifle	Tino Mohaupt; Germany	Sergei Kruglov; Russia	Niccolò Campriani; Italy
25 metre standard pistol	Balazs Adrian Pal; Hungary	Marcel Goelden; Germany	Leonid Yekimov; Russia
25 metre rapid fire pistol	Marcel Goelden; Germany	Leonid Yekimov; Russia	Piotr Daniluk; Poland
50 metre pistol	Leonid Yekimov; Russia	Ivan Rybovalov; Ukraine	Lee Dae-myung; South Korea
50 metre rifle prone	Maksym Komirenko; Ukraine	Adam Gładyszewski; Poland	Chen Qiulong; China
50 metre rifle three positions	Yuriy Yurkov; Kazakhstan	Milenko Sebić; Serbia	Damian Kontny; Germany
Skeet	Andreas Chasikos; Cyprus	Nikolay Pilshelnikov; Russia	Ralf Buchheim; Germany
Trap	Lorenzo Prosperi; Italy	Yuriy Nikandrov; Ukraine	Jozef Hupka; Slovakia
Double trap	Aleksandr Furasev; Russia	Athimet Khamgasem; Thailand	Mikhail Leibo; Russia
10 metre running target	Gan Lin; China	Łukasz Czapla; Poland	Vladislav Prianishnikov; Ukraine
10 metre running target mixed	Dmitry Romanov; Russia	Łukasz Czapla; Poland	Maxim Stepanov; Russia

==== Team ====
Event	Gold	Silver	Bronze
10 metre air pistol	South Korea (KOR); Ha Gil-yong; Lee Dae-myung; Lee Jun-hee	Russia (RUS); Leonid Yekimov; Andrey Brayko; Alexey Gnidchenko	Ukraine (UKR); Ivan Rybovalov; Ivan Bidnyak; Serhiy Kudrya
10 metre air rifle	Russia (RUS)	South Korea (KOR)	Germany (GER)
25 metre standard pistol	Russia (RUS)	Kazakhstan (KAZ)	Thailand (THA)
25 metre rapid fire pistol	Russia (RUS); Leonid Yekimov; Ivan Stukachev; Gleb Rodin	South Korea (KOR); Kim Dae-yoong; Oh Chang-yoon; Kang Yung-chul	Kazakhstan (KAZ); Vladimir Issachenko; Sergey Vokhmyanin; Aleksandr Vokhmyanin
50 metre pistol	Russia (RUS)	Ukraine (UKR); Ivan Rybovalov; Ivan Bidnyak; Serhiy Kudrya	South Korea (KOR)
50 metre rifle prone	Germany (GER); Damian Kontny; Christian Stautmeister; Tino Mohaupt	Ukraine (UKR); Maksym Komirenko; Mykola Vdovychenko; Denys Chumachenko	China (CHN); Chen Qiulong; Xiao Ying; Zhu Pengfei
50 metre rifle three positions	China (CHN)	Kazakhstan (KAZ)	Russia (RUS)
Skeet	Italy (ITA); Michele Bertossi; Luigi Agostino Lodde; Alessio Forti	Cyprus (CYP); Andreas Chasikos; Vasilis Sotiriou; Elias Mastrou	China (CHN); Li Wei; Dun Yueheng; Zhang Yansong
Trap	Italy (ITA); Lorenzo Prosperi; Giuseppe Cavassi; Luca Botto	Cyprus (CYP)	China (CHN)
Double trap	Russia (RUS); Aleksandr Furasev; Vladimir Miroshnichenko; Mikhail Leibo	Italy (ITA); Giovanni Garbi; Ferdinando Rossi; Simone Doi	Chinese Taipei (TPE); Chen Shih-wei; Lin Chin-hsien; Shih Jung-hung
10 metre running target mixed	Russia (RUS)	China (CHN)	Ukraine (UKR); Oleksandr Zinenko; Vladislav Prianishnikov; Dmytro Yatsenko

=== Women's events ===
==== Individual ====
Event	Gold	Silver	Bronze
10 metre air pistol	Sarao Harveen; India	Olena Kostevych; Ukraine	Kira Mozgalova; Russia
10 metre air rifle	Manuela Felix; Germany	Liao Sha; China	Wang Qinqin; China
25 metre pistol	Wang Jieyi; China	Tsogbadrakhyn Mönkhzul; Mongolia	Viktoria Chaika; Belarus
50 metre rifle prone	Natalia Chepurina; Ukraine	Regin Time; Austria	Wang Qinqin; China
50 metre rifle three positions	Wang Qinqin; China	Daniela Pešková; Slovakia	Agnieszka Staroń; Poland
Skeet	Chen Wei Wei; China	Sutiya Jiewchaloemmit; Thailand	Kim Ae-kyun; South Korea
Trap	Zuzana Štefečeková; Slovakia	Marina Sauzet; France	Yang Weisa; China
Double trap	Janejira Srisongkram; Thailand	Rachel Parish; Great Britain	Zuzana Štefečeková; Slovakia

==== Team ====
Event	Gold	Silver	Bronze
10 metre air pistol	Ukraine (UKR); Yuliya Korostylova; Olena Kostevych; Inna Kriachko	South Korea (KOR); In So-youn; Lee Ho-lim; Han Yoo-jung	India (IND); Sarao Harveen; Sitwita Chaudhary; Kaur Lakhbir
10 metre air rifle	China (CHN); Wang Qinqin; Liao Sha; Zhang Yue	Germany (GER); Manuela Felix; Beate Gauss; Jessica Kregel	Russia (RUS); Daria Vdovina; Olga Desyatskaya; Alena Nizkoshapskaya
25 metre pistol	China (CHN); Li Jie; Sun Yi; Wang Jie Yi	Russia (RUS); Kira Mozgalova; Elena Toichka; Alena Suslunova	Ukraine (UKR); Yuliya Korostylova; Oxana Los; Olena Kostevych
50 metre rifle prone	Thailand (THA); Ratchadaporn Plengseangthong; Paramaporn Ponglaokham; Sasithorn Hongprasert	China (CHN); Wang Qinqin; Xie Jieqiong; Liu Jie	Russia (RUS); Daria Vdovina; Tatiana Yakovleva; Valentina Protasova
50 metre rifle three positions	Czech Republic (CZE); Lucie Valová; Adéla Sýkorová; Zuzana Šostková	Germany (GER); Manuela Felix; Beate Gauss; Jessica Kregel	Thailand (THA); Paramaporn Ponglaokham; Kusuma Tavisri; Sasithorn Hongprasert
Skeet	China (CHN); Zhou Ling; Jin Yan; Chen Wei Wei	South Korea (KOR); Kim Min-ji; Cho Ara; Kim Ae-kyun	Russia (RUS)
Trap	China (CHN); Yang Weisa; Yang Xiaohui; Li Huatao	Italy (ITA); Maria Francesca Floris; Marina Moioli; Anastasia Monica Mancinelli	Thailand (THA); Supawan Karjeajuntasak; Janejira Srisongkram; Neungnuch Ratanaprasit
