= Anatoliy Buznyk =

Ukrainian footballer (born 1961)

Personal information
- Full name: Anatoliy Ivanovych Buznyk
- Date of birth: 21 May 1961 (age 65)
- Place of birth: Mykolaiv, Ukrainian SSR
- Height: 1.80 m (5 ft 11 in)
- Position: Defender

Senior career*
Years	Team	Apps	(Gls)
1979–1982	FC Sudnobudivnyk Mykolaiv	96	(8)
1983	FC Dnipro Cherkasy	?	(?)
1984	SKA Kyiv	?	(?)
1985–1989	FC Sudnobudivnyk Mykolaiv	160	(14)
1992	FC Artania Ochakiv	2	(0)
1993	SC Mykolaiv-2	0	(0)

Managerial career
- 1992: FC Artania Ochakiv
- 1993: FC Evis Mykolaiv (ass't)
- 1994–1996: FC Polihraftekhnika Oleksandria
- 1997–1999: Ukraine-16
- 1999–2000: FC Borysfen Boryspil
- 2000: Jiangsu Guoxin-Sainty F.C. (Youth Team)
- 2001–2003: Ukraine student
- 2004: Ukraine-17
- 2005: Ukraine-18
- 2006: Ukraine-19
- 2007: Ukraine-16
- 2008: Ukraine-17
- 2009: Ukraine-18
- 2010–2011: FC Zirka Kirovohrad
- 2012: FC Metalurh Zaporizhzhia
- 2014: FC Zirka Kirovohrad
- 2017–: Ukraine students
- 2017–2022: Livyi Bereh Kyiv (sporting director)
- 2020–2022: Livyi Bereh Kyiv
- * Club domestic league appearances and goals

Anatoliy Ivanovych Buznyk (Ukrainian: Анатолій Іванович Бузник; born 21 May 1961) is a Ukrainian professional football manager and former player.

== Managing career ==
=== Ukraine national student football team ===
In 2001, under his management the Ukraine national student football team won the silver medals at the 2001 Summer Universiade in Beijing.

=== Zirka Kirovohrad ===
In April 2014 Buznyk was appointed for the second time as manager of Zirka Kirovohrad that was playing in the Ukrainian First League.
