= Viktor Zhylin =

Ukrainian footballer (1923–2009)

Personal information
- Full name: Viktor Stepanovych Zhylin
- Date of birth: 9 January 1923
- Place of birth: Tahanrih, Donetsk Governorate, Ukrainian SSR
- Date of death: 14 October 2009 (aged 86)
- Place of death: Borodianka, Kyiv Oblast, Ukraine
- Positions: Defender; forward

Youth career
- 1939–1941: Krylya Sovetov Taganrog

Senior career*
Years	Team	Apps	(Gls)
1944–1945	FC Dinamo Kursk	?	(?)
1945–1946	FC Dinamo Voronezh	?	(?)
1947–1950	FC Dynamo Kyiv	87	(14)
1951	FC Zenit Leningrad	22	(12)
1952	FC Dynamo Kyiv	10	(3)
1953	FK Daugava Rīga	?	(?)
1954	FC OBO Kyiv	11	(2)

Managerial career
- 1955–1957: Aviazavod Kyiv
- 1958: FC Lokomotyv Vinnytsia (assistant)
- 1959–1962: FC Lokomotyv Vinnytsia
- 1962–1963: FC Avanhard Kharkiv
- 1963–1964: FC Zirka Kirovohrad
- 1964–1965: FC Lokomotyv Vinnytsia
- 1966: FC Dniprovets Dniprodzerzhynsk
- 1966: FC Start Kyiv
- 1967–1970: FC Avtomobilist Zhytomyr
- 1971: FC Chornomorets Odesa
- 1971: FC Metalurh Zaporizhzhia (director)
- 1972: FC Metalurh Zaporizhzhia
- 1972: FC Shakhtar Oleksandria
- 1973: FC Zirka Kirovohrad
- 1974–1976: FC Avtomobilist Zhytomyr
- 1977: FC Spartak Ivano-Frankivsk
- 1977–1979: FC Lokomotyv Vinnytsia
- 1980: FC Kryvbas Kryvyi Rih
- 1980–1981: FC Mashynobudivnyk Borodyanka
- 1981–1983: FC Dnipro Cherkasy
- 1985–1986: FC Mashynobudivnyk Borodyanka
- 1987–1988: FC Skhid Kyiv
- 1990–1992: FC Dnipro Cherkasy
- 1993–2002: FC Systema-Boreks Borodyanka
- * Club domestic league appearances and goals

Viktor Stepanovych Zhylin (Ukrainian: Віктор Степанович Жилін; Russian: Виктор Степанович Жилин; 9 January 1923 – 14 October 2009) was a Ukrainian football player and manager.

== Playing career ==
Zhylin was born in the city of Tahanrih (today Taganrog), Donets Governorate.

Since childhood, playing in local Krylya Sovetov Taganrog, he was a member of the Great Patriotic War. A defender and forward, he played for FC Dinamo Kursk and FC Dinamo Voronezh. As a player Zhylin had successful stint with FC Dynamo Kyiv. Also played for FC Zenit Leningrad, FK Daugava Rīga and FC OBO Kyiv. He was nicknamed 'Berkut' during his Dynamo Kyiv stint.

== Coaching career ==
Graduation High School Coaches and the Kyiv Institute of Physical Education. Stood in the legendary origins of FC Lokomotyv Vinnytsia, and by managing this team, in 1959 became the champion of the Ukrainian SSR. He worked with football clubs: FC Avangard Kharkiv, FC Zirka Kirovohrad, FC Avtomobilist Zhytomyr, FC Chornomorets Odesa, FC Metalurh Zaporizhzhia, FC Spartak Ivano-Frankivsk, FC Kryvbas Kryvyi Rih, FC Mashynobudivnyk Borodyanka, FC Dnipro Cherkasy, FC Systema-Boreks Borodyanka.

The most famous disciples of Viktor Zhylin are Viktor Prokopenko, Valeriy Porkuyan, Semen Altman, Yevhen Kotelnykov and Leonid Buryak. On 14 October 2009 at the age of 86, Viktor Stepanovych Zhylin died.

== Managerial statistics ==
As of match played 28 May 2024

Team	Nat	From	To	Record				
Team	Nat	From	To	G	W	D	L	Win %
Lokomotyv V	(Soviet Union)	July 1959	1961	87	52	20	15	59.8
Avanhard	(Soviet Union)	2 October 1962	8 August 1963	29	7	9	13	24.1
Zirka	(Soviet Union)	1 January 1964	5 September 1964	34	19	6	9	55.9
Lokomotyv V	(Soviet Union)	15 September 1964	1965	59	22	23	14	37.3
Dniprovets	(Soviet Union)	1966	1966	38	12	9	17	31.6
Avtomobilist	(Soviet Union)	1967	1970	182	92	56	34	50.5
Chornomorets	(Soviet Union)	January 1971	March 1971	2	0	1	1	0.0
Metalurh Z	(Soviet Union)	24 May 1971	19 May 1972	46	18	15	13	39.1
Zirka	(Soviet Union)	1973	1973	49	25	0	24	51.0
Avtomobilist	(Soviet Union)	1975	1976	75	30	28	17	40.0
Spartak I-F	(Soviet Union)	1977	July 1977	20	5	8	7	25.0
Lokomotyv V	(Soviet Union)	1978	1978	44	14	16	14	31.8
Kryvbas	(Soviet Union)	1980	April 1980	6	1	4	1	16.7
Dnipro Ch	(Soviet Union)	1981	1983	98	34	25	39	34.7
Mashynobudivnyk Borodianka	(Soviet Union)	1986	1986	21	11	5	5	52.4
Dnipro Ch	(Soviet Union) (Ukraine)	1991	July 1992	81	27	14	40	33.3
Mashynobudivnyk Borodianka	(Ukraine)	August 1992	July 1995	106	62	21	23	58.5
Mashynobudivnyk Borodianka	(Ukraine)	July 1997	June 2002	154	75	47	32	48.7
Mashynobudivnyk Borodianka	(Ukraine)	October 2002	November 2002	5	2	2	1	40.0
Total				1,143	510	311	322	44.6

== Honours ==
=== Player ===
- Soviet Top League Runner-Up: 1952
- Football Cup of the Ukrainian SSR: 1947, 1948

=== Coach ===
- Soviet Class B (Ukraine): 1959
