= Mykhaylo Udod =

Ukrainian footballer

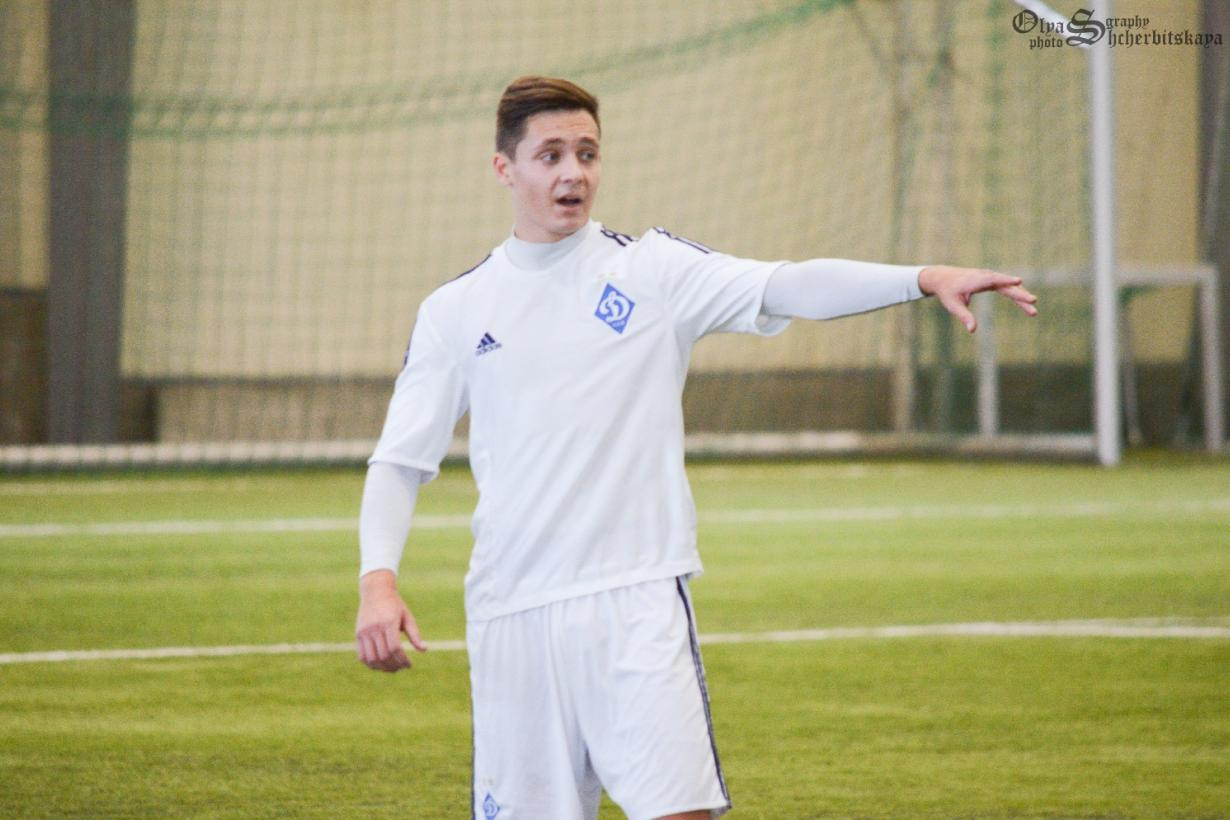

Personal information
- Full name: Mykhaylo Serhiyovych Udod
- Date of birth: 17 February 1997 (age 29)
- Place of birth: Ukraine
- Height: 1.85 m (6 ft 1 in)
- Position: Striker

Team information
- Current team: Dinamo Samarqand

Youth career
- 2010–2014: RVUFK Kyiv

Senior career*
Years	Team	Apps	(Gls)
2014–2016	Dynamo Kyiv	0	(0)
2015	→ Dynamo-2 Kyiv	12	(0)
2017	Vorskla Poltava	0	(0)
2018	Avanhard Kramatorsk	15	(0)
2019	Kremin Kremenchuk	13	(0)
2020	Kaganat	1	(0)
2020	VPK-Ahro Shevchenkivka	13	(0)
2021–	Dinamo Samarqand	0	(0)

International career
2019	Ukraine (students)		
- * Club domestic league appearances and goals as of 29 January 2021

Mykhaylo Udod (Ukrainian: Михайло Сергійович Удод; born 17 February 1997 in Ukraine) is a professional Ukrainian football striker who plays for Dinamo Samarqand.

== Career ==
Udod is a product of the FC RVUFK Kiev Sportive School.

He played for the FC Dynamo-2 Kyiv in the Ukrainian First League and in the FC Dynamo in the Ukrainian Premier League Reserves and Under 19.
