= Mikhail Ikonnikov =

Ukrainian Architect (1818–1897)

Mikhail Stepanovich Ikonnikov
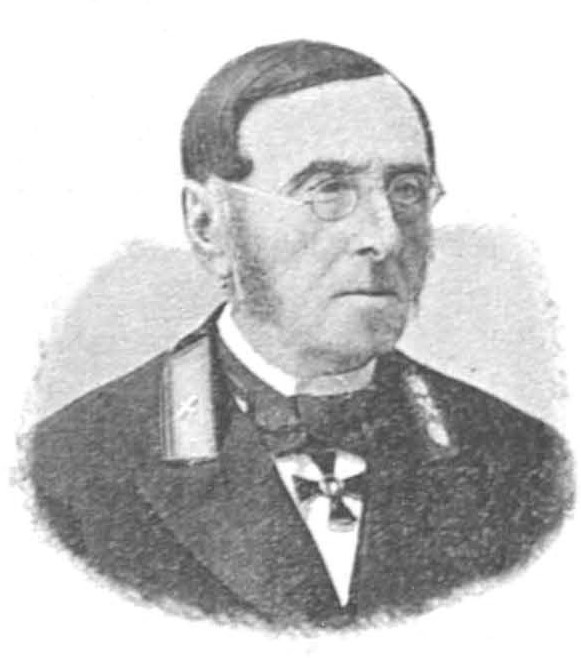
- Born: 1818; Kyiv
- Died: 1897 (aged 78–79)
- Education: Peterburg Institute of Civil Engineers
- Occupation: Architect

Mikhail Stepanovich Ikonnikov (Russian: Михаил Степанович Иконников; Ukrainian: Михайло Степанович Іконніков, Mykhailo Stepanovych Ikonnikov) (1818 – 9 July [21] 1897) was a Kyiv Guberniya architect, once famous among Kyiv city residents.

== Biography ==
In 1840 Ikonnikov graduated from the Peterburg Institute of Civil Engineers. He then worked in Kiev in the Governorate Construction Commission as a senior engineer, later as an architect. From 1854 to 1895, Ikonnikov was the Architect of Guberniya. In 1854-57 together with academician Ivan Shtrom and architect K.Skarzhynsky, he built the government building on Sofia Square in Kyiv.

In architecture, he preferred forms of Neo-Renaissance, Neo-Gothic and Neo-Russian styles. Ikonnikov used the Eclectic style for the chapel (1869) and tombstone of Aleksandr Bezak and his wife located in the Kyiv Caves Monastery.

Mikhail Ikonnikov is the brother of Vladimir Ikonnikov.

== Works ==
- Government building at Sofia Square (1854–57)
- Lukyanivska Prison, Kiev (1860)
- Church of Nicholas Naberzhny, Kiev (1863)
- University clinic buildings (1873–83)
