= Football at the 2009 Summer Universiade =

Football at the XXV Summer Universiade
- Venue: various
- Dates: 30 June 2009 – 10 July 2009
- Teams: 16 (men); 15 (women)

The Football competition in the 2009 Summer Universiade were held on different venues in Serbia between 30 June and 10 July 2009.

== Men ==
Event	Gold	Silver	Bronze
Men's football	Ukraine; Yuriy Bakhtiyarov; Andriy Zaporozhan; Vladyslav Piskun; Oleksiy Repa; Ihor Herbynsky; Andriy Bashlay; Artem Starhorodsky; Mykola Revutsky; Ihor Hordia; Dmytro Hunchenko; Ihor Khudobiak; Yuriy Kysylytsia; Andriy Shevchuk; Andriy Mysiaylo; Oleksandr Krokhmaliuk; Vladyslav Mykuliak; Matviy Bobal; Anton Monakhov; Vasyl Chornyi	Italy (ITA); Federico Nicastro; Ciro Oreste Sirignano; Fabio Cusaro; Samuele Salvadori; Roberto Rudi; Andrea Pippa; Luigi Cuomo; Giuseppe Lolaico; Ciro De Franco; Jacopo Galbiati; Francesco Amantini; Marco Dessena; Girolamo D'alessandro; Roberto Fusari; Giovanni Vriz; Pasquale Iadaresta; Alessandro Mosca; Mario Ramaglia	Japan (JPN); Kohei Kawata; Yuji Fujikawa; Kazuya Yamamura; Yuki Nakayama; Yusuke Higa; Hideto Takahashi; Masakazu Kihara; Daisuke Itoh; Kohei Mishima; Takanori Chiaki; Kazushi Mitsuhira; Akihiro Hayashi; Yuhei Nakagawa; Hiroki Yamada; Tsukasa Morimoto; Kosuke Nakamachi; Takashi Uchino; Hiroki Oka; Yudai Tanaka; Kensuke Nagai

== Women ==
Event	Gold	Silver	Bronze
Women's football	South Korea (KOR); Lee Sun-Min; Kim Danbi; Cho So-hyun; Lim Seon-joo; Shin Mina; Jeon Ga-eul; Kwon Eun-som; Kwon Hah-nul; Ji So-yun; Yoo Young-a; Lee Eun-mi; Kim Jin-young; Kim Do-yeon; Jung Won-jung; Hwang Bo-ram; Shim Seo-yeon; Kim Soo-yun; Kim Seuri	Japan (JPN); Hoshimi Kishi; Naoko Sakuramoto; Chika Shimada; Nana Takahashi; Midori Isokane; Shiho Kohata; Hitomi Ono; Kie Koyama; Hikari Nakade; Noriko Matsuda; Ami Otaki; Misa Sugawara; Izumi Osada; Noriko Yamauchi; Aki Tago; Haruka Takahashi; Rie Usui; Asako Ideue; Risa Ikadai; Kana Kitahara	Great Britain (GBR); Lauren Wells; Vicky Jones; Alex Culvin; Rachael Axon; Faye Marsh; Jade Radburn; Levi Penny; Amy Kane; Gwennan Harries; Stacey Aisthorpe; Lauren Walker; Kelly Jones; Naomi Bruton; Jodie Taylor; Grace Mccatty; Lauren Impey; Danielle Ackerman; Julie Melrose; Katie Holtham
