= Brice Cognard =

Footballer (born 1990)

Personal information
- Full name: Brice Georges Attila Cognard
- Date of birth: 26 April 1990 (age 36)
- Place of birth: Paris, France
- Height: 1.88 m (6 ft 2 in)
- Position: Goalkeeper

Youth career
- 1996-2003: Saint-Brice FC
- 2003-2004: AAS Sarcelles
- 2004-2006: Entente SSG
- 2006-2009: Racing Club de France

Senior career*
Years	Team	Apps	(Gls)
2009–2013	Saint-Denis		
2013–2014	Saint-Brice		
2014–2015	Poissy	0	(0)
2015–2017	Saint-Ouen-L'Aumône	53	(0)
2017–2020	Poissy	73	(0)
2020–2023	Avranches	43	(0)
2021–2023	Avranches II	26	(0)
2023–2025	Châteauroux	15	(0)

International career
2022–	Guadeloupe	5	(0)
- * Club domestic league appearances and goals as of 16 October 2024

Brice Georges Attila Cognard (born 26 April 1990) is a professional footballer who plays as a goalkeeper. Born in metropolitan France, he plays for the Guadeloupe national team.

== Club career ==
Cognard started playing football at the age of six, joining the academy of amateur side Saint-Brice. He progressed through the academies of Entente SSG and Racing Club before making his senior debut for Saint-Denis. He returned to Saint-Brice before spending a season with Poissy, though he made no appearances for the club in the Championnat de France Amateur 2.

He spent two full seasons at Saint-Ouen-L'Aumône, before returning to Poissy in 2017. After three seasons at the club, he joined Championnat National side Avranches in 2020. He signed a one-year contract extension in June 2022.

In July 2023, he moved to Châteauroux.

== International career ==
Cognard represented France at the 2017 Summer Universiade in Tapei, where he led France to the final before being beaten by Japan. Cognard was highly regarded by French media for his performance at the tournament, saving two penalties in the quarter-final penalty shoot-out against Argentina, before scoring one himself. He repeated this same feat in the semi-final against Uruguay, as France won 5–4 on penalties.

Though he was born in Paris, Cognard's mother is from Guadeloupe, making him eligible to represent the island. He was called up to the Guadeloupe football team for the 2023 CONCACAF Gold Cup, having already made three appearances for the team in the 2022–23 CONCACAF Nations League B.

== Career statistics ==
=== Club ===
As of 26 June 2023.

Appearances and goals by club, season and competition
Club	Season	League			Cup		Other		Total	
Club	Season	Division	Apps	Goals	Apps	Goals	Apps	Goals	Apps	Goals
Poissy	2014–15	CFA 2	0	0	0	0	0	0	0	0
Saint-Ouen-L'Aumône	2015–16	CFA 2	24	0	0	0	0	0	24	0
Saint-Ouen-L'Aumône	2016–17	CFA 2	26	0	0	0	0	0	26	0
Saint-Ouen-L'Aumône	2017–18	Championnat National 3	3	0	0	0	0	0	3	0
Saint-Ouen-L'Aumône	Total		53	0	0	0	0	0	53	0
Poissy	2017–18	Championnat National 2	23	0	0	0	0	0	23	0
Poissy	2018–19	Championnat National 2	30	0	0	0	0	0	30	0
Poissy	2019–20	Championnat National 2	20	0	0	0	0	0	20	0
Poissy	Total		73	0	0	0	0	0	73	0
Avranches	2020–21	Championnat National	27	0	0	0	0	0	27	0
Avranches	2021–22	Championnat National	14	0	0	0	0	0	14	0
Avranches	2022–23	Championnat National	2	0	0	0	0	0	2	0
Avranches	Total		43	0	0	0	0	0	43	0
Avranches II	2021–22	Championnat National 3	11	0	0	0	0	0	11	0
Avranches II	2022–23	Championnat National 3	13	0	0	0	0	0	13	0
Avranches II	Total		26	0	0	0	0	0	26	0
Career total			193	0	0	0	0	0	193	0
