= Francesco Amantini =

Italian footballer (born 1987)

Personal information
- Full name: Francesco Amantini
- Date of birth: 9 September 1987 (age 39)
- Place of birth: Sassocorvaro, Italy
- Height: 1.66 m (5 ft 5 in)
- Position: Midfielder

Team information
- Current team: Novafeltria Calcio

Senior career*
| Years | Team | Apps | (Gls) |
| 2005–2006 | Riccione | 31 | (0) |
| 2006–2012 | San Marino Calcio | 114 | (4) |
| XXXX–2016 | Piandimeleto Calcio | | |
| 2016– | Novafeltria Calcio | | |
- * Club domestic league appearances and goals

Francesco Amantini (born 9 September 1987) is an Italian footballer. He plays as a midfielder for Novafeltria Calcio
