= Ivan Rybovalov =

Ukrainian sport shooter

Personal information
- Nationality: Ukraine
- Born: 29 November 1981 (age 44) Simferopol, Ukrainian SSR, Soviet Union
- Height: 1.78 m (5 ft 10 in)
- Weight: 65 kg (143 lb)

Sport
- Sport: Shooting
- Event(s): 10 m air pistol (AP60); 50 m pistol (FP)
- Club: Dynamo Odesa
- Coached by: Viktor Makarov
Medal record
Men's shooting
Representing Ukraine
World Championships
Bronze medal – third place	2002 Lahti	50 m pistol team
Bronze medal – third place	2002 Lahti	10 m air pistol team
Universiade
Silver medal – second place	2007 Banghkok	50 m pistol
Silver medal – second place	2007 Banghkok	50 m pistol team

Ivan Rybovalov (Ukrainian: Іван Рибовалов; born November 29, 1981, in Simferopol) is a Ukrainian sport shooter.

== Career ==
He won two bronze medals in both air and free pistol at the ISSF World Cup series (2005 in Changwon, South Korea, and 2007 in Munich, Germany).

Rybovalov represented Ukraine at the 2008 Summer Olympics in Beijing, where he competed in two pistol shooting events, along with his teammate Oleg Omelchuk. He scored a total of 572 targets in the preliminary rounds of the men's 10 m air pistol, by three points behind Vietnam's Nguyễn Mạnh Tường from the final attempt, finishing only in thirty-fifth place. Three days later, Rybovalov placed twentieth in his second event, 50 m pistol, by one point ahead of United States' Jason Turner from the final attempt, with a total score of 553 targets.
