= Tino Mohaupt =

German sports shooter (born 1983)

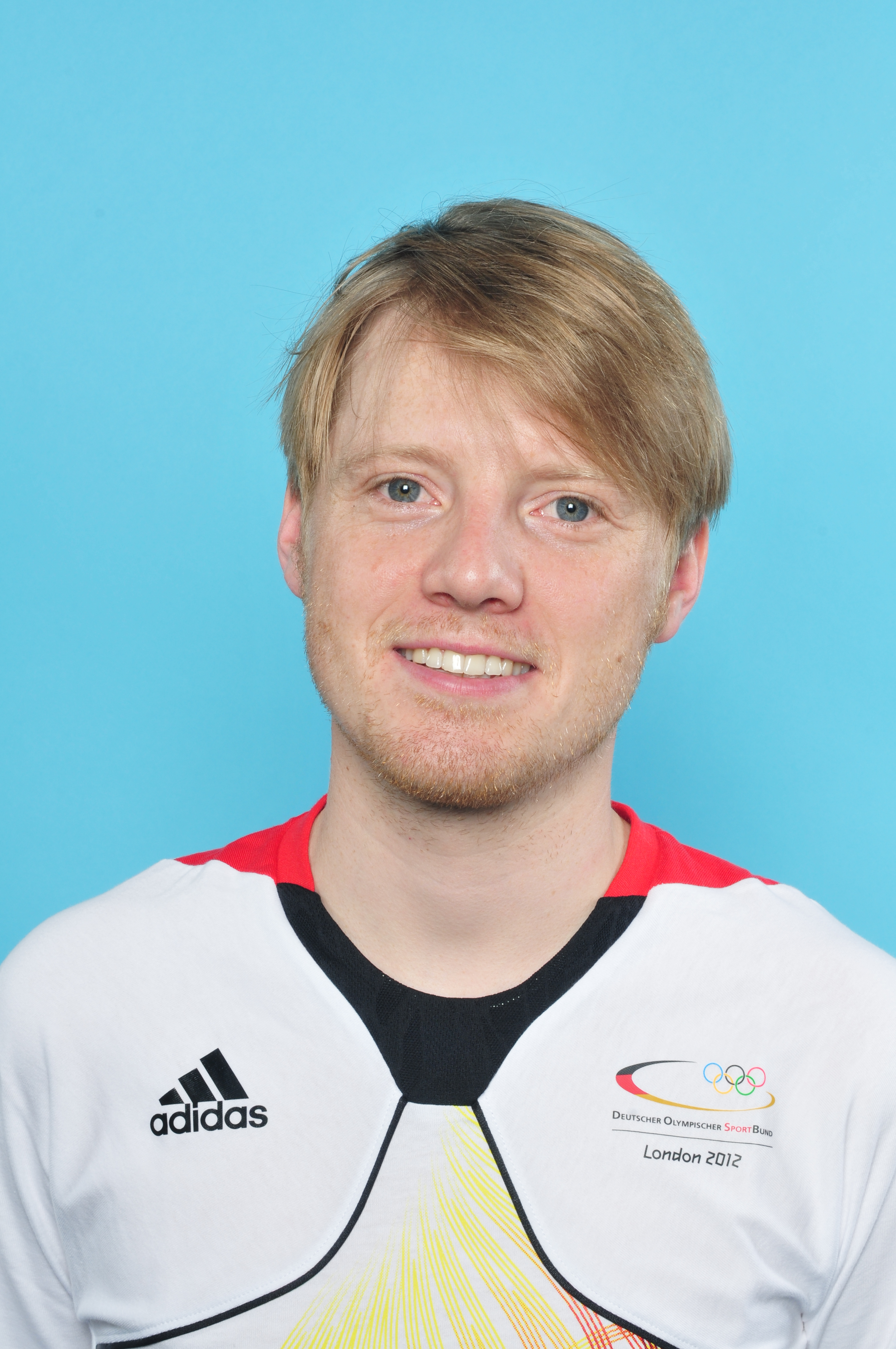
- Mohaupt in 2012

Personal information
- Born: 29 August 1983 (age 42) Suhl, East Germany

Sport
- Sport: Sports shooting

Tino Mohaupt (born 29 August 1983) is a German sports shooter. He competed at the 2008 and 2012 Summer Olympics.
