= Vasyl Chornyi =

Ukrainian footballer

Personal information
- Full name: Vasyl Ivanovych Chornyi
- Date of birth: 30 October 1987 (age 38)
- Place of birth: Rohachyn, Ukrainian SSR, Soviet Union
- Position: Midfielder

Senior career*
Years	Team	Apps	(Gls)
2005–2010	Nyva Ternopil	22	(1)
2007–2009	→Ternopil-Burevisnyk (loan)		
2010–2016	Ternopil	85	(8)
2012	→Sokil Zolochiv (loan)	2	(0)
2016–2017	Krystal Chortkiv	9	(1)
2016–2022	FC Ukraine United		
2022	Podillia Vasylkivtsi		
2023–2024	Medobory Zelene		
2025–	FC Borshchiv		

Managerial career
- 2025: FC Borshchiv
Medal record
Men's football
Representing Ukraine
Summer Universiade
Gold medal – first place	2009 Belgrade	Team competition
- * Club domestic league appearances and goals

Vasyl Chornyi (Ukrainian: Васи́ль Іва́нович Чо́рний; born October 3, 1987) is a Ukrainian footballer.

== Club career ==
=== Early career ===
Chornyi started playing football at the Ternopil SDYUSHOR and later continued his performances at the youth level at the Ternopil Pedlyceum. In 2005, he joined the professional ranks by signing with Nyva Ternopil in the Ukrainian Second League. The following season, he debuted in the Ukrainian Cup against Desna Chernihiv.

In 2007 and 2008, Nyva loaned him to their farm team, Ternopil-Burevisnyk. In the 2008-09 season, he helped Nyva Ternopil secure promotion to the Ukrainian First League by winning their division. The following season, he debuted in the country's second-tier league with Nyva.

=== FC Ternopil ===
In 2009, he permanently signed with FC Ternopil and competed in the Ternopil regional league. Throughout the season, Chornyi helped Ternopil secure the league double. The club also won the European Student Championship. Once the season concluded, he received the Master of Sports of Ukraine, International Class. The following season, the club debuted in the Ukrainian Amateur Football Championship. He also helped Ternopil defend their league double in the Ternopil league. In 2012, he was loaned to Sokil Zolochiv to play in the Lviv regional league.

In 2012, he returned to the professional level when Ternopil secured a position in the Ukrainian Second League. Ternopil re-signed Chornyi for the 2012-13 season. In the following season, he helped Ternopil reach the quarterfinals of the 2013–14 Ukrainian Cup, where Ukrainian Premier League side Chornomorets Odesa defeated them. He also helped Ternopil secure a promotion to the Ukrainian First League. In 2014, he returned to the country's second-tier league when the club re-signed him. Chornyi missed the majority of the season due to an injury. After a five-month injury, he returned to action in February 2015. Shortly after his return, he received another injury, ruling him out for two weeks. He re-signed with Ternopil the next season as a player-assistant coach. He participated in his final Ukrainian Cup, where Shakhtar Donetsk eliminated them in the round of 16.

After seven seasons with Ternopil, he joined Krystal Chortkiv in the Ternopil regional league. Chornyi participated in the 2016–17 national amateur league with Kystal.

=== Canada ===
In the summer of 2016, FC Ukraine United of the Canadian Soccer League signed him. In his debut season in the Canadian circuit, he helped the club secure a playoff berth by finishing second in the league's first division. In the preliminary round of the postseason, the team defeated the Brantford Galaxy. Their playoff campaign would conclude in the next round after a defeat to the Serbian White Eagles.

Chornyi re-signed with Toronto for the 2017 season, during which the club competed in the league's second division. In his second season with the club, he helped win the league double. In the championship final, they defeated Burlington SC. The following season, the club returned to the league's first division, where Chornyi was re-signed. He helped the club secure the divisional title and, as a result, clinched a playoff berth. However, the Toronto side was eliminated in the second round of the postseason by Scarborough SC.

In 2019, he helped the team reach the championship final, where Scarborough defeated them. He played in the Ontario Soccer League in 2021 with Ukraine United.

=== Ukraine ===
Chornyi returned to Ukraine in 2022 to sign with Podillia Vasylkivtsi in the Ternopil region. In 2023, he signed with Medobory Zelene, but missed the majority of the season due to injuries.

== International career ==
In 2009, he was selected for the Ukrainian national student football team to represent the country at the 2009 Summer Universiade. The national team defeated Italy to secure the gold medal. Chornyi represented Ukraine at the 2011 Summer Universiade.

== Managerial career ==
In 2015, while he was recovering from his injuries, he was named a player-assistant coach for Ternopil's manager, Vasyl Ivehesh.

In 2025, Chornyi was the assistant coach to Serhiy Atlasyuk for FC Borshchiv. A month later, he was named the interim manager for FC Borshchiv. The following season, Chornyi was replaced by Vasyl Malik.

== Honors ==
FC Nyva Ternopil

- Ukrainian Second League Group A: 2008–09

FC Ternopil

- Ternopil Oblast Championship: 2009, 2010
- Ternopil Oblast Cup: 2009, 2010

FC Ukraine United

- CSL II Championship: 2017
- Canadian Soccer League First Division: 2018
- Canadian Soccer League Second Division: 2017

Ukraine Students

- Summer Universiade Gold medal: 2009
- European Universities Football Championships Gold medal: 2009
