= Vadym Hostyev =

Ukrainian footballer

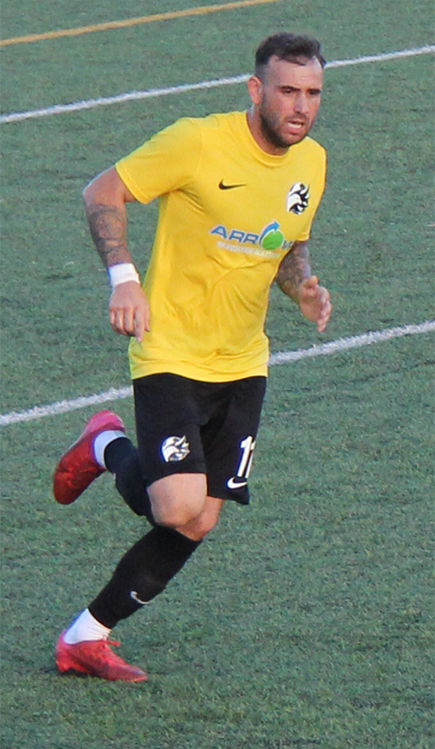
- Hostyev in 2022

Personal information
- Full name: Vadym Hostyev
- Date of birth: January 19, 1987 (age 39)
- Place of birth: Odesa, Ukraine SSR, Soviet Union
- Position: Midfielder

Senior career*
Years	Team	Apps	(Gls)
2005–2007	FC Krasyliv	25	(3)
2006	→ Iskra-Skirts (loan)	6	(0)
2009–2010	FC Sfântul Gheorghe Suruceni	16	(0)
2009–2010	FC Helios Kharkiv	6	(0)
2010–2012	MFC Mykolaiv	18	(0)
2011–2012	FC Real Pharma Odesa	5	(0)
2012–2013	FC Odesa	32	(1)
2013–2014	FC Enerhiya Mykolaiv	16	(0)
2015	FC Zhemchuzhyna Odesa	11	(2)
2016	FC Ukraine United	21	(1)
2017–2021	FC Vorkuta	28	(6)
2022	Toronto Falcons		
2023	Dynamo Toronto		

International career
2007	Ukraine Students		
Medal record
Men's football
Representing Ukraine
Summer Universiade
Gold medal – first place	2007 Bangkok	Team competition
- * Club domestic league appearances and goals as of December 7, 2018

Vadym Hostyev (Ukrainian: Вадим В'ячеславович Гостєв; born January 19, 1987) is a Ukrainian footballer.

== Club career ==
=== Europe ===
Hostyev began his career in 2005 with Krasyliv in the Ukrainian First League, where he played for two seasons. He had a brief stint in the Ukrainian Amateur League in 2006 with Iskra-Skirts on a loan deal. In 2009, he played abroad in Moldova's National Division with Sfântul Gheorghe Suruceni. He debuted for Suruceni on July 5, 2009, against Nistru Otaci. After a season abroad, he returned to the Ukrainian Second League to play with Helios Kharkiv.

In 2010, he played in the Ukrainian Second League with MFC Mykolaiv, where he assisted the club in securing promotion by winning the league title. He played in his native town of Odesa the following season with Real Pharma Odesa. In 2012, he signed with city rivals Odesa, which marked his return to the second division.

After Odesa's relegation, he returned to the third division. In 2015, he played with Zhemchuzhyna Odesa.

=== Canada ===
In 2016, he went overseas to Canada to sign with FC Ukraine United of the Canadian Soccer League. Throughout the season, he helped Ukraine United secure a playoff berth by finishing second in the league's first division. The western Toronto side defeated the Brantford Galaxy in the quarterfinal round. Ukraine's playoff journey would conclude in the next round after a defeat by the Serbian White Eagles. Throughout the season, he played in 21 matches and recorded one goal.

After Ukraine United relegated themselves voluntarily to the league's second division, he signed with expansion side FC Vorkuta in 2017. In his debut season with Vorkuta, he helped the club secure the league's first division title. The following season, he helped Vorkuta secure a postseason berth and contributed a goal in the semifinals against SC Waterloo Region. He was featured in the CSL Championship match and secured the title against Scarborough SC. In 2020, he assisted in securing Vorkuta's second championship title after defeating Scarborough.

In his fifth and final season with Vorkuta, he assisted in securing Vorkuta's third regular-season title and secured the ProSound Cup against Scarborough. He also played in the 2021 playoffs. where Vorkuta was defeated by Scarborough in the championship final.

In 2022, he signed with the expansion franchise, the Toronto Falcons. Following a single season with the Falcons, he signed with Dynamo Toronto in 2023.

== International career ==
In 2007, he played with the Ukrainian national student's football team and received the title of Master of Sports of Ukraine of international class.

== Honors ==
MFC Mykolaiv

- Ukrainian Second League Group A: 2010–11

FC Vorkuta

- CSL Championship: 2018, 2020
- Canadian Soccer League First Division/Regular Season: 2017, 2019, 2021
- ProSound Cup: 2021

Ukraine national student team

- Summer Universiade Champion: 2007
