= Oleksandr Zinenko =

Ukrainian sports shooter

Personal information
- Nationality: Ukrainian
- Born: 24 February 1979 (age 47) Kryvyi Rih, Ukrainian SSR, Soviet Union

Sport
- Sport: Sports shooting
Medal record
Men's shooting
Representing Ukraine
Universiade
Bronze medal – third place	2007 Banghkok	10 m running target mixed team

Oleksandr Zinenko (born 24 February 1979) is a Ukrainian sports shooter. He competed in the men's 10 metre running target event at the 2000 Summer Olympics.
