= Dmytro Pronevych =

Ukrainian footballer

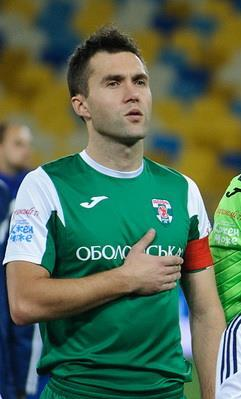
- Pronevych with Obolon-Brovar Kyiv in 2015

Personal information
- Date of birth: 19 November 1984 (age 41)
- Place of birth: Dubno, Rivne Oblast, Ukrainian SSR, Soviet Union
- Height: 1.74 m (5 ft 9 in)
- Position: Striker

Youth career
- 1998–2001: FC Dynamo Kyiv

Senior career*
Years	Team	Apps	(Gls)
2000–2001	FC Dynamo-3 Kyiv	8	(0)
2001	FC Veres Rivne	4	(0)
2003	FC Zorya Luhansk	4	(0)
2003	FC Avanhard Rovenky	2	(0)
2004–2005	FC Obolon-2 Kyiv	9	(0)
2005	Partick Thistle F.C.	4	(0)
2006	Queen of the South F.C.	2	(0)
2006–2007	FC Dnipro Cherkasy	19	(0)
2008	FC Knyazha Shchaslyve	8	(0)
2011	FC Lviv	11	(0)
2011–2013	FC Arsenal Bila Tserkva	54	(3)
2013–2017	FC Obolon-Brovar Kyiv	98	(1)
2017–2018	Cherkaskyi Dnipro	26	(0)
2018–2019	FC Malynsk		
2019–2020	FC Svitanok-Ahrosvit Shlyakhova		
2020–2021	Kudrivka		
2022	FC Continentals		

International career
2007	Ukraine (students)		
Medal record
Men's football
Representing Ukraine
Summer Universiade
Gold medal – first place	2007 Bangkok	Team competition
- * Club domestic league appearances and goals as of 9 May 2017

Dmytro Pronevych (born 19 November 1984) is a Ukrainian former footballer who played as a striker.

== Club career ==
=== Canada ===
In the summer of 2022, he played abroad in the Canadian Soccer League with FC Continentals. Throughout the season, he helped the club secure a postseason berth by finishing fourth in the standings. In the first round of the playoffs, the club defeated the Serbian White Eagles to qualify for the championship final. Pronevych appeared in the championship final, where they defeated Scarborough SC.

== Honors ==
FC Continentals

- CSL Championship: 2022
