= Vladyslav Mykulyak =

Footballer

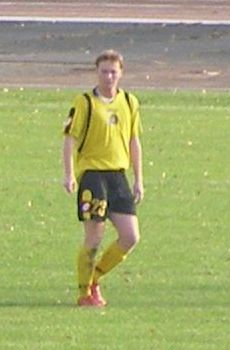

Personal information
- Date of birth: 30 August 1984 (age 42)
- Place of birth: Uzhhorod, Ukrainian SSR, Soviet Union
- Height: 1.82 m (6 ft 0 in)
- Position: Midfielder

Team information
- Current team: FC Mynai (assistant manager)

Youth career
- 1998: Sports School Ternopil
- 1998–2001: SSSOR Uzhhorod (Note: Specialized Sports School of Olympic Reserve Uzhhorod)

Senior career*
Years	Team	Apps	(Gls)
2001–2013	Hoverla Uzhhorod	179	(20)
2001–2002	→ Zakarpattia-2 Uzhorod	26	(3)
2011–2012	→ Krymteplytsia Molodizhne (loan)	30	(4)
2013	→ Poltava (loan)	9	(1)
2014	Slutsk	10	(0)
2014	Várda	4	(0)
2015	Tiszakanyár	13	(3)
2015	Baraninci		
2015–2017	Dlhé Klčovo	18	(10)
2017–2018	Mynai		
2018–2020	Mynai	42	(0)

International career
2009–2011	Ukraine (students)		

Managerial career
- 2021–: Mynai (assistant)
Medal record
Men's football
Representing Ukraine
Summer Universiade
Gold medal – first place	2009 Belgrade	Team competition
- * Club domestic league appearances and goals as of 19 August 2020

Vladyslav Mykulyak (Ukrainian: Владислав Степанович Микуляк; born 30 August 1984) is a Ukrainian retired professional footballer.

== Honours ==
Ukraine national team

- Football at the 2009 Summer Universiade: Champion
