= Matviy Bobal =

Ukrainian footballer

Personal information
- Full name: Matviy Matviyovych Bobal
- Date of birth: 27 May 1984 (age 42)
- Place of birth: Uzhhorod, Ukrainian SSR, Soviet Union
- Height: 1.80 m (5 ft 11 in)
- Position: Forward

Youth career
- 1998: SSSOR Uzhhorod (Note: Specialized Sports School of Olympic Reserve Uzhhorod)
- 1998–1999: UFK Lviv
- 1998: SSSOR-4 Lviv (Note: Specialized Sports School of Olympic Reserve – 4 Lviv)
- 1998: Kovel-Volyn Kovel
- 1999: Shakhtar Donetsk
- 2000–2001: SSSOR Uzhhorod

Senior career*
Years	Team	Apps	(Gls)
2000	Zakarpattia Uzhhorod	15	(1)
2001	CSKA-2 Kyiv	6	(0)
2000	Zakarpattia Uzhhorod	34	(2)
2001–2002	→ Zakarpattia-2 Uzhhorod	16	(6)
2004	Tavriya Simferopol	2	(0)
2004–2005	Krymteplitsia Molodizhne	20	(3)
2006–2008	Ihroservice Simferopol	96	(57)
2009	Tavriya Simferopol	9	(0)
2010–2011	Hoverla-Zakarpattia Uzhhorod	26	(15)
2011–2012	Dacia Chişinău	7	(3)
2012	Dacia-2 Buiucani	2	(0)
2012	Mykolaiv	17	(4)
2013	Zhemchuzhyna Yalta	6	(1)
2013–2014	Sobrance	14	(20)
2014	Zhemchuzhyna Yalta		
2014	FNN Yalta		
2015	TSK-Tavria Simferopol		
2015–2016	Bakhchisaray	19	(7)
2016	Mynai	12	(11)

International career
2009	Ukraine (students)		
Medal record
Men's football
Representing Ukraine
Summer Universiade
Gold medal – first place	2009 Belgrade	Team competition
- * Club domestic league appearances and goals

Matviy Bobal (Ukrainian: Матвій Матвійович Бобаль; born 27 May 1984) is a Ukrainian former football forward.

== Career ==
He has played for Zakarpattia Uzhhorod, CSKA Kyiv, Tavriya Simferopol, and FC Krymteplitsia Molodizhne in the past. He has been in Ihroservice since 2006.

Bobal was the top goalscorer in Ukrainian First League in the 2007–08 season with 23 goals (6 penalties) in 24 match appearances. He started off the 2008–09 season as top goalscorer of the first league by scoring a hat trick in the first match of the season.

On 8 January 2009 Bobal signed with Tavriya Simferopol after his outstanding performances in the Ukrainian First League placed him a head above every other goalscorer in the league.

== Honours ==
Ukraine national team

- Football at the 2009 Summer Universiade – Champion

Ihroservis Simferopol

- 2006–07 Ukrainian First League – Top scorer
- 2007–08 Ukrainian First League – Top scorer
