= FC Inter Boyarka =

FC Inter Boiarka
- Full name: Inter Boiarka
- Founded: 2005
- Dissolved: 2007
- Manager: Volodymyr Smovzh

Inter Boiarka was a Ukrainian football club that last played in Boiarka, Kyiv Oblast during Ukrainian Second League 2006-07 season. The club was led by Volodymyr Smovzh and Borys Rudenko.

== History ==
In the 2005–06 season, the club Osvita Kyiv ceased to exist after the winter break. The Kyiv Oblast Football Federation reallocated their place to Boyarka, and until the end of the season, the team played under the name Boyarka-2006. The club nearly lost its professional status; only MFC Zhytomyr's removal from the championship saved them from relegation from the Second League. In the new 2006–07 season, the club changed their name to "Inter". But at the end of the season, they took last place (15th), lost their professional status, and ceased to exist.

The club set a new anti-record at that time by going 35 matches without a win from 4 September 2005 to 14 October 2006.

== League and cup history ==
Season	Div.	Pos.	Pl.	W	D	L	GS	GA	P	Domestic Cup	Europe	Notes
2005–06	3rd "A" (Druha Liha "A")	15	28	2	3	23	13	82	9	1/32 finals		the club replaced Osvita Kyiv
2006–07	3rd "A" (Druha Liha "A")	15	28	3	6	19	17	61	15	1/32 finals		Renamed — Folded

== Head coaches ==
- (Ukraine) Volodymyr Smovzh (Apr 8, 2006)
- (Ukraine) Borys Rudenko (Apr 13, 2006 – Apr 19, 2006) (caretaker)
- (Ukraine) Volodymyr Smovzh (Apr 26, 2006 – Jun, 2006)
- (Ukraine) Borys Rudenko (Jul 31, 2006 – Aug 15, 2006) (caretaker)
- (Ukraine) Volodymyr Smovzh (Aug 20, 2006 – Jun, 2007)

== Notable Player ==
- Andriy Vitoshynskyi

== See also ==
- FC Systema-Boreks Borodianka
