= Artem Shtanko =

Ukrainian footballer

Personal information
- Full name: Artem Anatoliyovych Shtanko
- Date of birth: 6 September 1980 (age 46)
- Height: 1.82 m (5 ft 11 1/2 in)
- Position: Goalkeeper

Senior career*
Years	Team	Apps	(Gls)
1998–1999	Olimpiya FC AES Yuzhnoukrainsk	8	(0)
1999–2003	Mykolaiv	64	(0)
2004–2007	Illichivets Mariupol	0	(0)
2004–2007	→ Illichivets-2 Mariupol	38	(0)
2008–2010	Obolon Kyiv	25	(0)
2010–2013	Kryvbas Kryvyi Rih	24	(0)
2013–2015	Luch-Energiya Vladivostok	16	(0)
2017–2018	Sumy	24	(0)
Medal record
Men's football
Representing Ukraine
Summer Universiade
Gold medal – first place	2007 Bangkok	Team competition
- * Club domestic league appearances and goals as of 20 March 2019

Artem Anatoliyovych Shtanko (Ukrainian: Артем Анатолійович Штанько; born 6 September 1980) is a Ukrainian football goalkeeper.
