= Lee Keun-ho (footballer, born 1993) =

South Korean footballer

Personal information
- Full name: Lee Keun-ho
- Date of birth: February 27, 1993 (age 33)
- Place of birth: Seoul, South Korea
- Height: 1.72 m (5 ft 7 1/2 in)
- Position: Midfielder

Senior career*
Years	Team	Apps	(Gls)
2012	Omiya Ardija	0	(0)
2013	→ Giravanz Kitakyushu (loan)	5	(1)
2014	→ Blaublitz Akita (loan)	23	(3)
2017	Jeonju Citizen FC		
2018	Pocheon Citizen FC		
2020	Jeonju Citizen FC		
- * Club domestic league appearances and goals as of December 31, 2014

Lee Keun-ho (born February 27, 1993) is a South Korean football player.

== Playing career ==
Lee Keun-ho joined to J1 League club; Omiya Ardija in 2013. He moved to J2 League club; Giravanz Kitakyushu in 2014 season and J3 League club; Blaublitz Akita in 2015 season.

== Club statistics ==
Club performance			League		League Cup		Total	
Season	Club	League	Apps	Goals	Apps	Goals	Apps	Goals
Japan			League		J.League Cup		Total	
2013	Omiya Ardija	J1 League	0	0	0	0	0	0
2014	Giravanz Kitakyushu	J2 League	5	1	-		5	1
2015	Blaublitz Akita	J3 League	23	3	-		23	3
Career total			28	4	0	0	28	4
