= Roman Lutsenko =

Ukrainian footballer (born 1985)

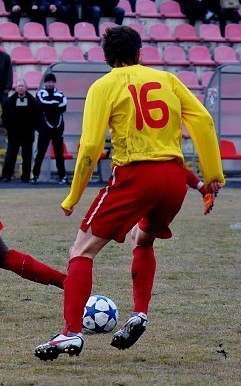

Personal information
- Date of birth: 20 January 1985 (age 41)
- Place of birth: Hlukhiv, Sumy Oblast, Ukraine
- Height: 1.78 m (5 ft 10 in)
- Position: Midfielder

Youth career
- 1998–2002: RVUFK Kyiv
- 2002–2004: FC Moscow

Senior career*
Years	Team	Apps	(Gls)
2005	FC Nyva Vinnytsia	16	(0)
2005	FC Bershad	17	(3)
2006	FC Chornomorets Odesa	1	(0)
2007	MFC Mykolaiv	28	(1)
2008–2009	FC Metalurh Zaporizhya	3	(0)
2010–2011	FC Zirka Kirovohrad	24	(5)
2011–2013	FC Desna Chernihiv	36	(3)
2014	MFC Mykolaiv	15	(3)
2015–	Veleten Hlukhiv	30	(5)

International career
2007	Ukraine (students)		
Medal record
Men's football
Representing Ukraine
Summer Universiade
Gold medal – first place	2007 Bangkok	Team competition
- * Club domestic league appearances and goals

Roman Lutsenko (born 20 January 1985) is a Ukrainian professional football who plays as a midfielder.

== Career ==
He played for Metalurh Zaporizhya in the Ukrainian Premier League. Lutsenko debuted for the Metalurh Zaporizhya senior team on 26 April 2008 during a home game in the Ukrainian Premier League against rivals Arsenal Kyiv, which the team lost 1–0.
