= Roman Voynarovskyi =

Ukrainian footballer (born 1980)

Roman Voynarovskyy
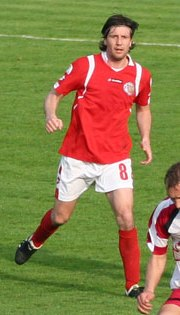

Personal information
- Full name: Roman Vasylyovych Voynarovskyy
- Date of birth: 5 January 1980 (age 46)
- Place of birth: Zolotinka, Neryungrinsky District, Yakut ASSR, Russian SFSR
- Height: 1.75 m (5 ft 9 in)
- Position: Midfielder

Senior career*
Years	Team	Apps	(Gls)
1997	FC Dynamo Saky	7	(1)
1997–2003	SC Tavriya Simferopol	39	(0)
2001	→ FC Tytan Armyansk (loan)	9	(1)
2001–2003	→ FC Dynamo Simferopol (loan)	37	(7)
2004	FC Spartak Ivano-Frankivsk	13	(2)
2004	FC Prykarpattya Kalush		
2004–2005	FC Dynamo-Ihroservice Simferopol	30	(9)
2005–2009	FC Krymteplytsia Molodizhne	92	(12)
2006	→ FC Stal Alchevsk (loan)	6	(0)
2009–2010	FC Desna Chernihiv	10	(2)
2010–2012	PFC Sevastopol	35	(4)
2012	FC Zirka Kirovohrad	7	(0)
2012–2013	FC Tytan Armyansk		

International career
2007	Ukraine (students)		

Managerial career
- 2014–2016: FC Tosno (assistant)
- 2016–2017: FC TSK-Tavria Simferopol (assistant)
- 2017: FC TSK-Tavria Simferopol (caretaker)
- 2017–: FC Kyzyltash Bakhchisarai
- * Club domestic league appearances and goals

Roman Voynarovskyy (Ukrainian: Роман Васильович Войнаровський) (born 5 January 1980 in Russian SFSR) is a retired Ukrainian football midfielder. In 2008 he scored a goal in the first 4 seconds of a match, the fastest goal ever scored in Ukrainian professional football.
