= Vladimir Ikonnikov =

Russian historian (1841–1923)

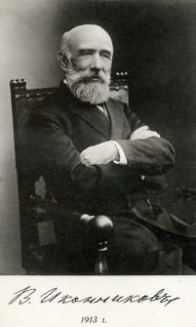
- Born: December 21, 1841; Kiev, Russian Empire
- Died: November 26, 1923 (aged 81); Kyiv, Soviet Ukraine

Academic work
- Discipline: History

Vladimir Stepanovich Ikonnikov (Russian: Владимир Степанович Иконников) or Volodymyr Stepanovych Ikonnykov (Ukrainian: Володимир Степанович Іконников) was a historian in Imperial Russia and Soviet Ukraine specializing in study of historiography. Ikonnikov was an academician of the Saint Petersburg Academy of Sciences, a professor and a dean of the History and Philology faculty of Kiev University, and an academic at the All-Ukrainian Academy of Sciences.

He was born in Kiev in the family of a landlord, who belonged to the regional nobility. In 1852–1861, Ikonnikov studied at the Kiev Kadet School on state funds. In 1861–1865 he studied at the Kiev University, History and Philology faculty at the department of Russian history. Soon after his graduation, Ikonnikov was teaching history at the Kiev Military Gymnasium and history of general literature in the Kiev Institute for Noble Maidens. In 1866–67 he was a privatdozent at Kharkov University. In 1867 Ikonnikov was teaching history and philology in several gymnasiums in Odessa. Here in Odessa University in 1867, he defended his dissertation "Maksim Grek. Historical and literary research" (Russian: «Максим Грек. Историко-литературное исследование») receiving a magister degree in Russian history. In 1869 he defended his doctoral dissertation at the same university on "Research experience of cultural significance of Byzantium Empire in Russian History (Russian: «Опыт исследования о культурном значении Византии в русской истории»). After that Ikonnikov, headed the department of Russian history at Kiev University.

In 1870, he received the title of professor. In 1872, he co-founded the Nestor the Chronicler Historical Society. In 1873–1913 Ikonnikov, was an acting chief editor of "Universitetskie izvestiya" (University News) published by Kiev University. Between 1877 and 1887 he served as a dean of the Kiev University History and Philology faculty. In 1874–1877 and 1893–1895 Ikonnikov was a chairman of Nestor the Chronicler Historical Society. In 1878–1889 he was a director of Kiev Higher Women Courses. In 1904 Ikonnikov was placed in charge of the Kyiv Archeographic Commission.

He is a brother of the Kiev Governorate architect Mikhail Ikonnikov and a father-in-law of Vsevolod Petrov.

== Important works ==
- "Maksim Grek. Historical and literary research" (Russian: «Максим Грек. Историко-литературное исследование») Kiev, 1865–66
- "Russian public figures in the 16th century" (Russian: «Русские общественные деятели XVI в.») 1866
- "Research experience of cultural significance of Byzantium Empire in Russian History (Russian: «Опыт исследования о культурном значении Византии в русской истории») Kiev, 1869
- "Sceptical school in Russian historiography" (Russian: «Скептическая школа в русской историографии») Kiev, 1871 ()
- "Count N.S. Mordvinov. Historical monograph" (Russian: «Граф Н. С. Мордвинов. Историческая монография») Saint Petersburg, 1873
- "Experience of Russian historiography" (Russian: «Опыт русской историографии») Kiev, 1892
- "Kiev 1648–1855. Historical essay (Russian: «Киев 1648–1855. Исторический очерк») 1904
- "Peasants movement in Kiev Governorate in 1826–27" (Russian: «Крестьянское движение в Киевской губернии в 1826–27 гг») 1905
