= Andriy Zaporozhan =

Ukrainian footballer

Personal information
- Full name: Andriy Yuriyovych Zaporozhan
- Date of birth: 21 March 1983 (age 43)
- Place of birth: Ovidiopol, Ukrainian SSR
- Height: 1.75 m (5 ft 9 in)
- Position: Midfielder

Team information
- Current team: Livyi Bereh Kyiv
- Number: 15

Youth career
- 1999: Chornomorets Odesa
- 1999–2000: Knyazha Shchaslyve

Senior career*
Years	Team	Apps	(Gls)
2000–2005	Borysfen Boryspil	69	(4)
2001–2003	→ Borysfen-2 Boryspil (loan)	25	(2)
2004	→ Boreks-Borysfen Borodianka (loan)	13	(0)
2004	→ Dnister Ovidiopol (loan)	11	(0)
2006–2007	Enerhetyk Burshtyn	65	(10)
2008–2020	Oleksandriya	274	(27)
2020–2021	UTK Palanka	2	(0)
2021	imeni Lva Yashyna Kyiv	9	(4)
2021–2022	Livyi Bereh Kyiv	8	(3)
2024–	Livyi Bereh Kyiv	1	(0)

Managerial career
- 2020–: Oleksandriya (assistant)
Medal record
Men's football
Representing Ukraine
Summer Universiade
Gold medal – first place	2007 Bangkok	Team competition
Gold medal – first place	2009 Belgrade	Team competition
- * Club domestic league appearances and goals as of 20 June 2024

Andriy Zaporozhan (born 21 March 1983) is a Ukrainian professional football midfielder who plays for Ukrainian club Livyi Bereh Kyiv.

He became the author of the first goal for FC Oleksandriya in the European competitions.

On 20 September 2024 Zaporozhan received his UEFA A coaching license.

== Honours ==
Ukraine national team

- Football at the 2007 Summer Universiade: Champion
- Football at the 2009 Summer Universiade: Champion

FC Oleksandriya

- 2010–11 Ukrainian First League: Champion
- 2014–15 Ukrainian First League: Champion
- 2013–14 Ukrainian First League: Runner-up
- 2018-19 Ukrainian Premier League: Bronze medalist

FC Borysfen Boryspil

- 2002–03 Ukrainian First League: Runner-up
- 1999–2000 Ukrainian Second League: Champion
