= Andriy Shevchuk =

Ukrainian footballer (born 1985)

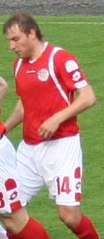

Personal information
- Full name: Andriy Volodymyrovych Shevchuk
- Date of birth: 12 August 1985 (age 41)
- Place of birth: Korosten, Ukrainian SSR, now Ukraine
- Height: 1.78 m (5 ft 10 in)
- Position: Forward

Youth career
- 1999–2002: Polissya Zhytomyr

Senior career*
Years	Team	Apps	(Gls)
2003–2004	Korosten	10	(0)
2005	Krystal Kherson	13	(3)
2005–2012	Sevastopol	194	(69)
2012	Tatran Prešov	9	(3)
2013–2015	Metalurh Zaporizhya	21	(2)
2015	Korosten	6	(3)
2016	Ternopil	18	(2)
2016	Krymteplytsia Molodizhne	5	(0)
2017–2018	Hirnyk-Sport Horishni Plavni	64	(16)

International career
2007–2009	Ukraine (students)		
Medal record
Men's football
Representing Ukraine
Summer Universiade
Gold medal – first place	2007 Bangkok	Team competition
Gold medal – first place	2009 Belgrade	Team competition
- * Club domestic league appearances and goals as of 18 March 2019

Andriy Shevchuk (Ukrainian: Андрій Володимирович Шевчук, born 12 August 1985) is a retired Ukrainian football striker.

== Career ==
On 5 July 2009, he opened score for Ukraine in the game against Canada at the 2009 Summer Universiade in Serbia.
