= Artem Starhorodskyi =

Ukrainian footballer (born 1982)

Personal information
- Full name: Artem Serhiyovych Starhorodskyi
- Date of birth: 17 January 1982 (age 44)
- Place of birth: Kyiv, Ukrainian SSR, Soviet Union
- Height: 1.79 m (5 ft 10 in)
- Position: Midfielder

Youth career
- 1998–2001: Dynamo Kyiv

Senior career*
Years	Team	Apps	(Gls)
1998–2001	Dynamo-3 Kyiv	61	(5)
2000	Dynamo-2 Kyiv	1	(0)
2001–2003	Systema-Boreks Borodianka	60	(4)
2004	Naftovyk Okhtyrka	32	(8)
2005	Tavriya Simferopol	27	(0)
2006	Krymteplytsia Molodizhne	25	(3)
2007–2012	Arsenal Kyiv	77	(4)
2013	Chornomorets Odesa	6	(0)
2013	Arsenal Kyiv	11	(0)
2014–2016	Shakhtyor Soligorsk	73	(12)
2017–2018	Arsenal Kyiv	41	(8)
2018–2019	Vitebsk	41	(2)
2020	Kolos Pustovarivka	7	(1)
2021	Livyi Bereh Kyiv	18	(3)
2022–2024	Shturm Ivankiv	30	(10)

International career
2009	Ukraine (students)		
Medal record
Men's football
Representing Ukraine
Summer Universiade
Gold medal – first place	2007 Bangkok	Team competition
Gold medal – first place	2009 Belgrade	Team competition
- * Club domestic league appearances and goals as of 31 December 2024

Artem Serhiyovych Starhorodskyi (born 17 January 1982) is a Ukrainian former professional footballer who played as a midfielder.

== International career ==
On 2 July 2009, Starhorodskyi scored a tying goal for Ukraine in the game against the Czech Republic at the 2009 Summer Universiade in Serbia.
