= Ihor Hordya =

Ukrainian footballer

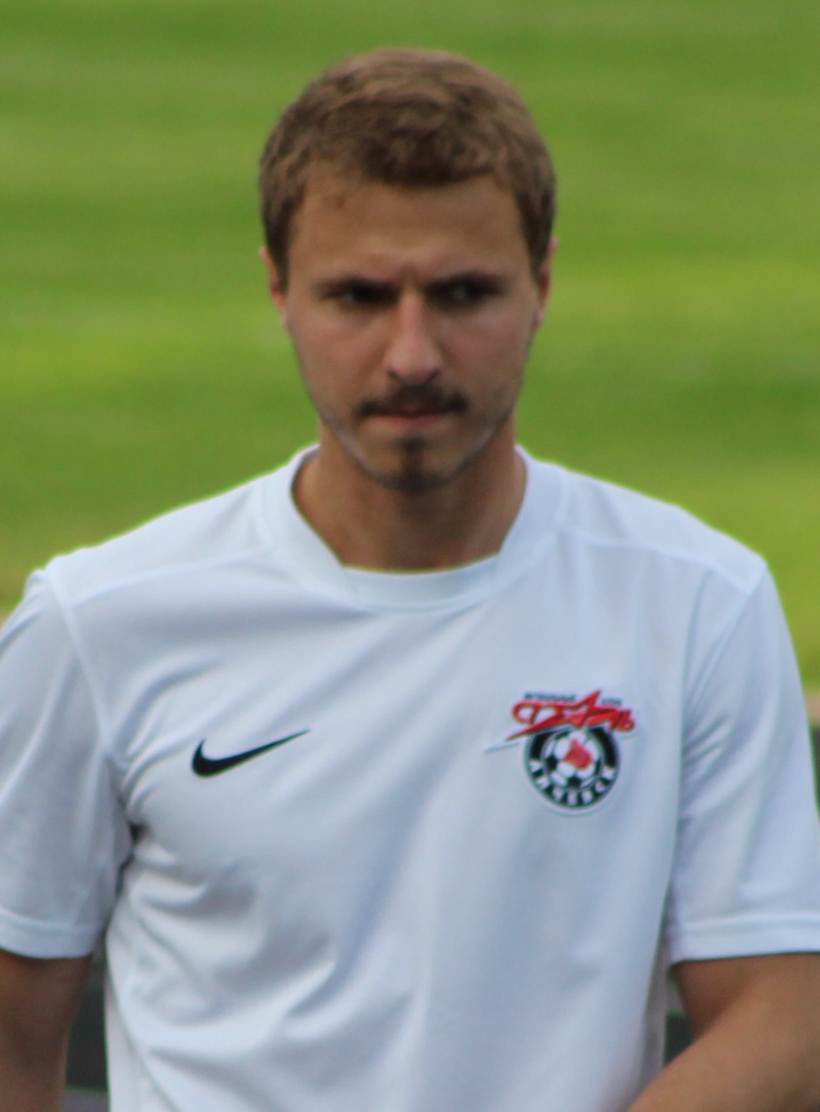

Personal information
- Full name: Ihor Volodymyrovych Hordya
- Date of birth: 3 April 1988 (age 38)
- Place of birth: Kremenchuk, Ukrainian SSR
- Height: 1.75 m (5 ft 9 in)
- Position: Midfielder

Youth career
- 2001–2004: Kremin Kremenchuk
- 2004–2005: Dnipro Dnipropetrovsk Youth

Senior career*
Years	Team	Apps	(Gls)
2005–2007	Dnipro Dnipropetrovsk	0	(0)
2008–2009	Metalurh Donetsk	0	(0)
2009–2011	Stal Alchevsk	57	(5)
2011	Gomel	1	(0)
2012	Warta Sieradz	9	(4)
2013	Oleksandriya	3	(0)
2013–2014	Stal Alchevsk	41	(2)
2015	Cherkaskyi Dnipro	1	(0)
2015	Kremin Kremenchuk	6	(0)
2016	Mykolaiv	3	(0)
2016	Avanhard Kramatorsk	8	(0)
2018	Viktoriya Sumy		
2018–2019	SV Ramlingen-Ehlershausen	9	(0)

International career
2003	Ukraine U15	2	(0)
2003–2004	Ukraine U16	6	(0)
2007	Ukraine U19	5	(0)
Medal record
Men's football
Representing Ukraine
Summer Universiade
Gold medal – first place	2007 Bangkok	Team competition
Gold medal – first place	2009 Belgrade	Team competition
- * Club domestic league appearances and goals

Ihor Hordya (Ukrainian: Ігор Володимирович Гордя; born 3 April 1988) is a Ukrainian former professional footballer who played as a midfielder.

He is the product of the Dnipro Dnipropetrovsk Youth school system. Hordya made his debut for senior team only in Ukrainian First League for FC Stal Alchevsk in match 30 August 2009 against FC Naftovyk-Ukrnafta Okhtyrka.
