= Andriy Bashlay =

Ukrainian footballer (born 1985)

Personal information
- Full name: Andriy Oleksandrovych Bashlay
- Date of birth: 16 February 1985 (age 41)
- Place of birth: Kiev, Ukrainian SSR, Soviet Union
- Height: 1.81 m (5 ft 11 1/2 in)
- Position: Defender

Youth career
- 1998–2002: FC Dynamo Kyiv

Senior career*
Years	Team	Apps	(Gls)
2001–2007	FC Dynamo Kyiv	0	(0)
2001–2004	→ FC Dynamo-3 Kyiv	46	(0)
2002–2005	→ FC Dynamo-2 Kyiv	64	(1)
2006	→ FC Arsenal Kyiv (loan)	2	(0)
2006	→ FC Obolon Kyiv (loan)	4	(0)
2007	→ FC Karpaty Lviv (loan)	0	(0)
2007	FC Stal Alchevsk	11	(0)
2008	FSC Prykarpattya Ivano-Frankivsk	18	(0)
2008–2009	FC Knyazha Shchaslyve	15	(0)
2009–2010	PFC Sevastopol	40	(1)
2011	FC Sumy	8	(0)
2011	FC Nyva Ternopil	9	(0)
2012–2013	FC Iskra-Stal	23	(0)
2013–2014	FC Tytan Armyansk	18	(0)
2014	FC Arsenal Kyiv	2	(0)
2015	Lehia Kyiv	13	(0)

International career
2005–2006	Ukraine U21	6	(0)
Medal record
Men's football
Representing Ukraine
Summer Universiade
Gold medal – first place	2007 Bangkok	Team competition
Gold medal – first place	2009 Belgrade	Team competition
- * Club domestic league appearances and goals

Andriy Bashlay (Ukrainian: Андрій Олександрович Башлай; born 16 February 1985) is a Ukrainian former professional football defender from Kiev.
