= Anton Monakhov =

Ukrainian-born Russian footballer

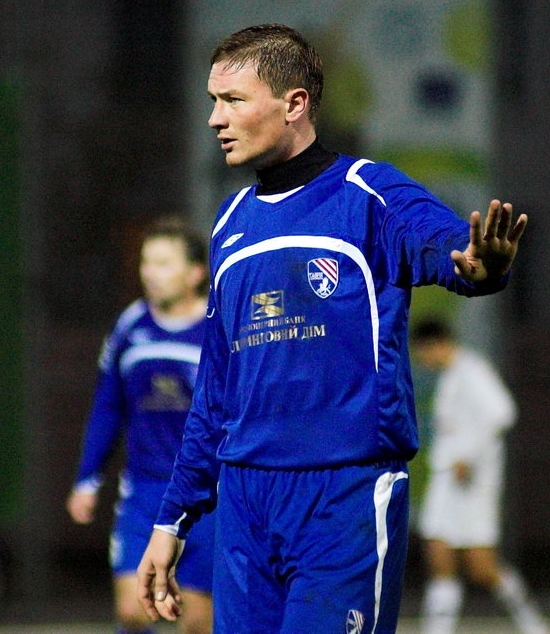

Personal information
- Full name: Anton Oleksandrovych Monakhov
- Date of birth: 31 January 1982 (age 44)
- Place of birth: Zaporizhia, Ukrainian SSR, Soviet Union
- Height: 1.92 m (6 ft 3 1/2 in)
- Position: Defender

Youth career
- Metalurh Zaporizhzhia

Senior career*
| Years | Team | Apps | (Gls) |
| 1998–1999 | Metalurh-2 Zaporizhzhia | 7 | (0) |
| 1999–2001 | Kryvbas Kryvyi Rih | 10 | (0) |
| 1999–2000 | → Kryvbas-2 Kryvyi Rih | 17 | (1) |
| 2001 | Spartak Moscow | 0 | (0) |
| 2002 | Torpedo-ZIL Moscow | 0 | (0) |
| 2002 | Kryvbas Kryvyi Rih | 12 | (0) |
| 2002–2004 | Uralan Elista | 7 | (0) |
| 2004 | Shakhtar-2 Donetsk | 11 | (0) |
| 2004–2005 | Vorskla Poltava | 22 | (0) |
| 2005–2006 | Tavriya Simferopol | 13 | (1) |
| 2006–2008 | Krymteplitsia Molodizhne | 50 | (8) |
| 2008 | Naftovyk-Ukrnafta Okhtyrka | 11 | (3) |
| 2009–2011 | Tavriya Simferopol | 93 | (6) |
| 2011–2013 | Sevastopol | 15 | (1) |
| 2013 | Slavutych Cherkasy | 9 | (0) |
| 2013 | Metalurh Zaporizhia | 2 | (0) |
| 2014 | Gandzasar Kapan | 8 | (0) |
| 2015–2021 | TSK Simferopol | 167 | (29) |

International career
| 2000 | Ukraine U17 | 1 | (0) |
| 2000 | Ukraine U18 | 9 | (0) |
| 2001 | Ukraine U19 | 4 | (0) |
| 2009 | Ukraine (students) | | |
Medal record
Men's football
Representing Ukraine
UEFA European Under-18 Championship
| Runner-up | 2000 Germany |
Summer Universiade
| Gold medal – first place | 2007 Bangkok | Team competition |
| Gold medal – first place | 2009 Belgrade | Team competition |
- * Club domestic league appearances and goals

Anton Oleksandrovych Monakhov (Russian: Антон Александрович Монахов; Ukrainian: Антон Олександрович Монахов; born 31 January 1982) is a Russian and Ukrainian former football defender.

== Career ==
On 10 July 2009, he scored a tying goal for Ukraine in the final game against Italy at the 2009 Summer Universiade in Serbia.

== Honours ==
Ukraine national team

- 2000 UEFA European Under-18 Football Championship: Runner-up
- Football at the 2007 Summer Universiade: Champion
- Football at the 2009 Summer Universiade: Champion

Tavriya Simferopol

- 2009–10 Ukrainian Cup: Winner

Kryvbas Kryvyi Rih

- 1999–2000 Ukrainian Cup: Finalist
