= Andrii Misiailo =

Ukrainian football midfielder (born 1988)

Andriy Misyaylo
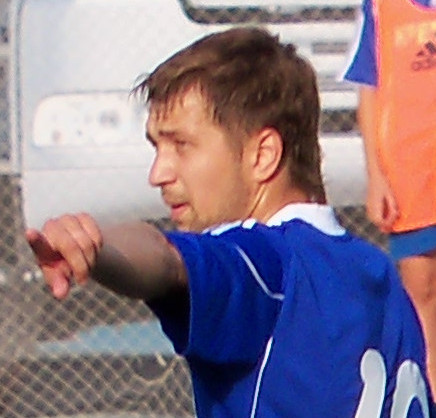

Personal information
- Full name: Andriy Fedorovych Misyaylo
- Date of birth: 24 March 1988 (age 38)
- Place of birth: Kurakhove, Ukrainian SSR
- Height: 1.68 m (5 ft 6 in)
- Position: Midfielder

Team information
- Current team: FC Rokyta

Youth career
- 2001–2003: Shakhtar Donetsk
- 2003–2005: Metalurh Donetsk

Senior career*
Years	Team	Apps	(Gls)
2005	Metalurh Donetsk	0	(0)
2006	Hirnyk-Sport Komsomolsk	23	(3)
2007	Illichivets-2 Mariupol	10	(0)
2008–2009	Vorskla Poltava	0	(0)
2009–2012	Kremin Kremenchuk	55	(4)
2012–2013	Hirnyk-Sport Komsomolsk	22	(9)
2013	Karlivka	3	(0)
2014	Makiivvuhillya	10	(1)
2015	FC Hlobyne	13	(5)
2017	FC Rokyta	4	(9)
2017	Kolos Lazirky	10	(12)
2018–2019	KLF Poltava	39	(42)
2020	Velyki Sorochyntsi	6	(6)
2020–2021	SC Poltava	26	(13)
2021	KLF Poltava	13	(9)
2022	Standart Novi Sanzhary	16	(7)
2023	FC Rokyta	4	(0)
Medal record
Men's football
Representing Ukraine
Summer Universiade
Gold medal – first place	2007 Bangkok	Team competition
Gold medal – first place	2009 Belgrade	Team competition
- * Club domestic league appearances and goals as of 26 May 2023

Andriy Fedorovych Misyaylo (Ukrainian: Андрій Федорович Місяйло; born 24 March 1988) is a Ukrainian football midfielder currently playing for Ukrainian amateur club FC Rokyta.

== Club history ==
Andriy Misyaylo began his football career in Shakhtar Youth in Donetsk. He signed with FC Kremin Kremenchuk during 2009 winter transfer window.

In 2023 Misyaylo joined amateur club FC Rokyta that plays in Poltava Oblast championship. He made his debut for Rokyta on 30 April playing for 65 minutes in a 3:0 win against Vorskla academy.

== Career statistics ==
As of 18 September 2009

Club	Season	League		Cup		Total	
Club	Season	Apps	Goals	Apps	Goals	Apps	Goals
Metalurh Reserves	2005–06	3	0	0	0	3	0
Metalurh Reserves	Total	3	0	0	0	3	0
Hirnyk-Sport	2005–06	10	1	0	0	10	1
Hirnyk-Sport	2006–07	13	2	1	0	14	2
Hirnyk-Sport	Total	23	3	1	0	24	3
Illichivets-2	2006–07	7	0	0	0	7	0
Illichivets-2	2007–08	3	0	0	0	3	0
Illichivets-2	Total	10	0	0	0	10	0
Vorskla Reserves	2007–08	8	0	0	0	8	0
Vorskla Reserves	Total	8	0	0	0	8	0
Vorskla	2008–09	15	0	0	0	15	0
Vorskla	Total	15	0	0	0	15	0
Kremin	2009–10	8	0	0	0	8	0
Kremin	Total	8	0	0	0	8	0
Career	Total	67	3	1	0	8	3

== Honours ==
Ukraine national team

- Football at the 2007 Summer Universiade: Champion
- Football at the 2009 Summer Universiade: Champion
