= Ihor Khudobyak (footballer, born 1987) =

Ukrainian footballer

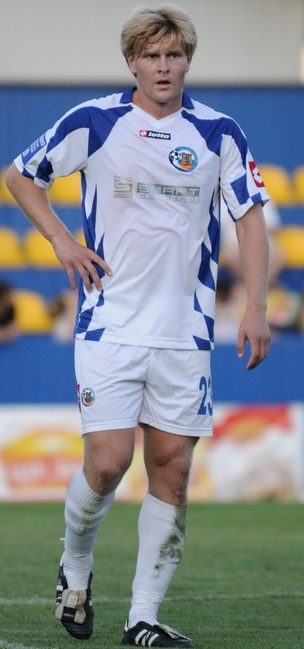

Personal information
- Full name: Ihor Orestovych Khudobyak
- Date of birth: 5 April 1987 (age 39)
- Place of birth: Halych, Ivano-Frankivsk Oblast, Ukrainian SSR
- Height: 1.86 m (6 ft 1 in)
- Position: Forward

Youth career
- 2002–2004: Spartak Ivano-Frankivsk

Senior career*
Years	Team	Apps	(Gls)
2004–2005	Fakel Ivano-Frankivsk	15	(6)
2006	Dynamo Kyiv	0	(0)
2006	→ Dynamo-2 Kyiv	12	(1)
2006–2009	Prykarpattya Ivano-Frankivsk	109	(29)
2010–2012	Sevastopol	21	(2)
2011	→ Gomel (loan)	7	(0)
2012	→ Enerhetyk Burshtyn (loan)	0	(0)
2012	Helios Kharkiv	13	(2)
2013	Hal-Vapno-Enerhetyk Halych	12	(10)
2013	Enerhiya Mykolaiv	21	(8)
2014	Ternopil	5	(1)
2015–2016	Hoverla Uzhhorod	13	(0)
2016–2019	Prykarpattia Ivano-Frankivsk	82	(47)
2021	Karpaty Halych	12	(3)

International career^{‡}
2005	Ukraine-18	5	(0)
Medal record
Men's football
Representing Ukraine
Summer Universiade
Gold medal – first place	2007 Bangkok	Team competition
Gold medal – first place	2009 Belgrade	Team competition
- * Club domestic league appearances and goals as of 25 July 2021 ‡ National team caps and goals as of 4 October 2015

Ihor Orestovych Khudobyak (Ukrainian: Iгор Орестович Худоб’як, born 5 April 1987) is a Ukrainian former professional football forward.

== Honours ==
=== Individual ===
- Summer Universiade champion: 2009
- Ukrainian Second League best player: 2016–17
- Ukrainian Second League top scorer: 2016–17
