= Russia women's national student football team =

Russia
- Association: Football Union of Russia
- Confederation: UEFA (Europe)
- FIFA code: RUS
First colours	Second colours

FIFA ranking
- Highest: 11
- Lowest: 27

First international
- China 0–0 Russia (Hamilton, Canada; 07.07.1993)

Biggest win
- Russia 8–0 Colombia (Gwangju, South Korea; 2015)

Biggest defeat
- China 4–0 Russia (Shenzhen, China; 2011)
Medal record
Women's football
Representing Russia
Summer Universiade
Bronze medal – third place	1993 Buffalo	Women's
Silver medal – second place	2007 Bangkok	Women's
Silver medal – second place	2015 Gwangju	Women's
Bronze medal – third place	2017 Taipei	Women's
Bronze medal – third place	2019 Naples	Women's

The Russian student women's football team represents Russia in international women's football. The team is controlled by the Football Union of Russia.

== Universiade record ==
Year	Result	Matches	Wins	Draws	Losses	GF	GA
(United States) / (Canada) 1993	3th	5	2	2	1	3	2
(Japan) 1995	Women's tournament not carried out						
(Italy) 1997	Women's tournament not carried out						
(Spain) 1999	Women's tournament not carried out						
(China) 2001	Did not enter						
(South Korea) 2003	Did not enter						
(Turkey) 2005	Did not enter						
(Thailand) 2007	2th	4	2	0	2	7	6
(Serbia) 2009	5th	5	4	1	0	17	4
(China) 2011	6th	6	2	1	3	5	6
(Russia) 2013	9th	6	4	0	2	10	5
(South Korea) 2015	2th	6	4	0	2	10	5
(Taiwan) 2017	3th	5	3	1	1	8	2
(Italy) 2019	3th	5	2	2	1	6	5
Total	8	44	24	9	11	80	34
