= Football at the Summer World University Games =

- Events: 2 (men: 1; women: 1)

Games
- 1959; 1960; 1961; 1962; 1963; 1964; 1965; 1966; 1967; 1968; 1970; 1970; 1973; 1972; 1975; 1975; 1977; 1978; 1979; 1981; 1983; 1985; 1987; 1989; 1991; 1993; 1995; 1997; 1999; 2001; 2003; 2005; 2007; 2009; 2011; 2013; 2015; 2017; 2019; 2021; 2025

Football at the Summer Universiade
- Founded: (Men) (Women)
- Current champions: Japan (M); North Korea (W) (2019)
- Most successful team(s): Japan (M) (7 titles); Brazil & North Korea (W) (3 titles each)
- 2019 (M), 2019 (W)

Football was an optional sport at the 1979 edition and two of the optional sports at the 1985 edition of the Universiade. Between 1987 and 2019, it was a recognized mandatory sport. The women's football competition began in the 1993 edition as an optional event. Due to the creation of the FISU University Football World Cup in 2019, the sport is no longer part of the Summer World University Games program, as of that year. With this change, the number of mandatory sports was kept at 15, since the place was occupied by badminton, which, after five editions as an optional sport, became compulsory.

== Summary (1979-2021) ==
18 editions for men + 11 editions for women

Games	Year	Teams (M+W)	Ref
1			
2			
3			
4			
5			
6			
7			
8			
9			
10	1979	26+0	
11			
12			
13	1985	12+0	
14	1987	16+0	
15			
16	1991	16+0	
17	1993	16+7	
18	1995	16+0	
19	1997	16+0	
20	1999	16+0	
21	2001	16+12	
22	2003	16+12	
23	2005	16+12	
24	2007	16+16	
25	2009	16+16	
26	2011	16+12	
27	2013	16+12	
28	2015	16+15	
29	2017	16+13	
30	2019	12+12	
31			
32			
33			
34			

== Men's tournaments ==
=== Results ===
Year	Host	Final			Third place
Year	Host	Gold medal	Score	Silver medal	Bronze medal	Score	Fourth place
1979 details	Mexico	Mexico	5–3	Uruguay	Romania	4–1	Netherlands
1985 details	(Japan); Kobe	North Korea	1–0	Uruguay	China	4–2	Japan
1987 details	(Socialist Federal Republic of Yugoslavia); Zagreb	Soviet Union	5–0	South Korea	North Korea	3–0	China
1991 details	(United Kingdom); Sheffield	South Korea	0–0 aet (5–4) pen	Netherlands	Great Britain	2–1	Uruguay
1993 details	(United States); Buffalo	Czech Republic	2–1	South Korea	Germany	2–1	Great Britain
1995 details	(Japan); Fukuoka	Japan	2–0	South Korea	Russia	3–1	Ukraine
1997 details	(Italy); Palermo	Italy	1–0	South Korea	United States	2–1	Ukraine
1999 details	(Spain); Palma de Mallorca	Spain	2–1 aet	Italy	Brazil	2–2 aet (5–4) pen	Czech Republic
2001 details	(China); Beijing	Japan	1–0	Ukraine	South Korea	0–0 aet (5–4) pen	China
2003 details	(South Korea); Daegu	Japan	3–2	Italy	Czech Republic	3–1	Morocco
2005 details	(Turkey); İzmir	Japan	3–3 aet (3–2) pen	Italy	Morocco	1–1 aet (4–3) pen	Brazil
2007 details	(Thailand); Bangkok	Ukraine	1–0	Italy	Thailand	1–1 aet (5–3) pen	Canada
2009 details	(Serbia); Belgrade	Ukraine	3–2	Italy	Japan	1–0	Great Britain
2011 details	(China); Shenzhen	Japan	2–0	Great Britain	Brazil	2–0	Russia
2013 details	(Russia); Kazan	France	3–2 aet	Great Britain	Japan	3–0	Russia
2015 details	(South Korea); Gwangju	Italy	3–0	South Korea	Japan	0–0 aet (7–6) pen	Brazil
2017 details	(Taiwan); Taipei	Japan	1–0	France	Mexico	0–0 (5–3) pen	Uruguay
2019 details	(Italy); Naples	Japan	4–1	Brazil	Italy	2–2 (4–3) pen	Russia

=== Teams reaching the top four ===
Team	Gold	Silver	Bronze	Fourth place
Japan	7 (1995*, 2001, 2003, 2005, 2011, 2017, 2019)		3 (2009, 2013, 2015)	1 (1985*)
Italy	2 (1997*, 2015)	5 (1999, 2003, 2005, 2007, 2009)	1 (2019)	
Ukraine	2 (2007, 2009)	1 (2001)		2 (1995, 1997)
South Korea	1 (1991)	5 (1987, 1993, 1995, 1997, 2015*)	1 (2001)	
France	1 (2013)	1 (2017)		
Russia	1 (1987)		1 (1995)	3 (2011, 2013*, 2019)
Czech Republic	1 (1993)		1 (2003)	1 (1999)
Mexico	1 (1979*)		1 (2017)	
North Korea	1 (1985)		1 (1987)	
Spain	1 (1999*)			
Great Britain		2 (2011, 2013)	1 (1991*)	2 (1993, 2009)
Uruguay		2 (1979, 1985)		2 (1991, 2017)
Brazil		1 (2019)	2 (1999, 2011)	2 (2005, 2015)
Netherlands		1 (1991)		1 (1979)
China			1 (1985)	2 (1987, 2001*)
Morocco			1 (2005)	1 (2003)
Romania			1 (1979)	
Germany			1 (1993)	
United States			1 (1997)	
Thailand			1 (2007*)	
Canada				1 (2007)

* = Host

=== Comprehensive team results by tournament ===
Nation	(Mexico) 1979	(Japan) 1985	(Socialist Federal Republic of Yugoslavia) 1987	(United Kingdom) 1991	(United States) 1993	(Japan) 1995	(Italy) 1997	(Spain) 1999	(China) 2001	(South Korea) 2003	(Turkey) 2005	(Thailand) 2007	(Serbia) 2009	(China) 2011	(Russia) 2013	(South Korea) 2015	(Taiwan) 2017	(Italy) 2019
Algeria	6th	10th	14th	11th														
Argentina			12th														8th	12th
Australia				12th	15th	8th		15th										
Brazil			16th			12th	8th	3rd	6th		4th	10th	9th	3rd	14th	4th	9th	2nd
Canada	11th				16th	16th				15th		4th	12th	9th	7th	13th	10th	
China		3rd	4th				5th		4th	7th	15th			7th	12th	10th		
Chinese Taipei																16th	16th	
Colombia														10th				
DR Congo (Zaire)	19th																	
Cuba	20th																	
Czech Republic					1st	5th	10th	4th	5th	3rd	6th	11th	5th	11th				
El Salvador	18th																	
France	9th	11th	13th						10th				7th		1st	8th	2nd	7th
Germany		9th	11th	13th	3rd													
Ghana													15th	15th				
Great Britain	13th	8th	10th	3rd	4th	15th	12th	9th	7th	8th	13th	8th	4th	2nd	2nd			
Indonesia	22nd																	
Iran				16th		6th	13th	5th	11th	5th	11th					14th		
Iraq	17th																	
Italy					12th		1st	2nd	13th	2nd	2nd	2nd	2nd	8th	11th	1st	5th	3rd
Japan	7th	4th	8th	8th	5th	1st	9th	13th	1st	1st	1st	5th	3rd	1st	3rd	3rd	1st	1st
Kazakhstan												14th						
Kuwait	14th	12th																
Kyrgyzstan												15th						
Lesotho	23rd																	
Madagascar	8th																	
Malaysia												12th		12th	8th	15th	14th	
Mexico	1st	6th		15th				7th	14th	14th	5th	6th	16th		9th	11th	3rd	9th
Morocco	12th						16th	8th	8th	4th	3rd	9th	13th					
Namibia														16th				
Netherlands	4th		5th	2nd	8th		7th											
Nigeria			15th	7th	9th	10th	14th	14th	16th	16th								
North Korea		1st	3rd	6th														
Peru															15th			
Republic of Ireland				14th	13th	13th	6th	12th	12th	13th	12th	13th	14th		5th	5th	13th	8th
Romania	3rd			10th														
Russia (Soviet Union)			1st	9th	6th	3rd					7th			4th	4th	9th	6th	4th
Saudi Arabia	16th																	
Serbia (Yugoslavia)			9th										8th					
Slovakia					7th	11th												
South Africa					14th	7th	15th			12th	16th					6th	12th	11th
South Korea	5th	5th	2nd	1st	2nd	2nd	2nd	6th	3rd	9th	14th		6th	5th		2nd	11th	5th
Spain	10th							1st										
Tanzania	24th																	
Thailand									15th	6th	10th	3rd	10th	13th				
Turkey											9th				13th			
Ukraine						4th	4th	11th	2nd	11th		1st	1st	14th	6th	12th	7th	6th
United States	15th	7th	6th	5th	11th	9th	3rd										15th	
Uruguay	2nd	2nd	7th	4th	10th	14th	11th	10th	9th	10th	8th	7th	11th	6th	10th	7th	4th	10th
Zambia	21st																	

- — Host

== Women's tournaments ==
=== Results ===
Year	Host	Final			Third place
Year	Host	Gold medal	Score	Silver medal	Bronze medal	Score	Fourth place
1993 details	(United States); Buffalo	China	2–1	United States	Russia	2–0	Chinese Taipei
2001 details	(China); Beijing	Brazil	2–1 aet	Netherlands	South Korea	4–3	France
2003 details	(South Korea); Daegu	North Korea	3–0	Japan	China	2–0	Chinese Taipei
2005 details	(Turkey); İzmir	Brazil	2–1	China	Japan	2–0	France
2007 details	(Thailand); Bangkok	North Korea	1–0	Russia	Brazil	2–1	Republic of Ireland
2009 details	(Serbia); Belgrade	South Korea	4–1	Japan	Great Britain	4–1	France
2011 details	(China); Shenzhen	China	2–1 aet	Japan	Brazil	4–1	France
2013 details	(Russia); Kazan	Great Britain	6–2	Mexico	Brazil	2–1	South Africa
2015 details	(South Korea); Gwangju	France	2–0	Russia	Japan	5–0	Canada
2017 details	(Taiwan); Taipei	Brazil	1–0	Japan	Russia	5–0	South Africa
2019 details	(Italy); Naples	North Korea	2–1	Japan	Russia	2–2 (4–2) (p)	Republic of Ireland

=== Teams reaching the top four ===
Team	Gold	Silver	Bronze	Fourth place
Brazil	3 (2001, 2005, 2017)		3 (2007, 2011, 2013)	
North Korea	3 (2003, 2007, 2019)			
China	2 (1993, 2011*)	1 (2005)	1 (2003)	
South Korea	1 (2009)		1 (2001)	
Great Britain	1 (2013)		1 (2009)	
France	1 (2015)			4 (2001, 2005, 2009, 2011)
Japan		5 (2003, 2009, 2011, 2017, 2019)	2 (2005, 2015)	
Russia		2 (2007, 2015)	3 (2003, 2017, 2019)	
United States		1 (1993*)		
Netherlands		1 (2001)		
Mexico		1 (2013)		
Chinese Taipei				2 (1993, 2003)
South Africa				1 (2013, 2017)
Republic of Ireland				2 (2007, 2019)
Canada				1 (2015)

* = Host

=== Comprehensive team results by tournament ===
Nation	(United States) 1993	(China) 2001	(South Korea) 2003	(Turkey) 2005	(Thailand) 2007	(Serbia) 2009	(China) 2011	(Russia) 2013	(South Korea) 2015	(Taiwan) 2017	(Italy) 2019
Argentina										13th	
Australia	7th										
Brazil		1st		1st	3rd	6th	3rd	3rd	6th	1st	11th
Canada	5th	10th	10th	5th	10th	7th	5th	10th	4th	8th	8th
China	1st	6th	3rd	2nd	8th	8th	1st	11th	5th		6th
Chinese Taipei	4th		4th	8th	14th		10th	8th	11th	11th	
Colombia									15th	12th	
Czech Republic				11th					8th		
Estonia						12th	12th	12th			
Finland		9th		7th							
France		4th	6th	4th	5th	4th	4th		1st		
Germany			9th		13th	10th					
Great Britain					7th	3rd	9th	1st		9th	
Hungary						13th					
Italy											7th
Japan	6th	7th	2nd	3rd	9th	2nd	2nd	5th	3rd	2nd	2nd
Mexico		11th	8th				8th	2nd	9th	7th	10th
Netherlands		2nd									
New Zealand			12th	9th	16th						
North Korea		5th	1st		1st						1st
Poland		8th			11th				10th		
Republic of Ireland			7th	6th	4th	14th		6th	13th	10th	4th
Russia	3rd				2nd	5th	6th	9th	2nd	3rd	3rd
Serbia						11th					
South Africa		12th	11th	10th	12th	15th	11th	4th	14th	4th	12th
South Korea		3rd	5th		6th	1st	7th	7th	7th	6th	5th
Thailand					15th						
Turkey				12th							
United States	2nd								12th	5th	9th
Number of teams	7	12	12	12	16	12	12	12	15	13	12

- — Host

== Combined medal table ==
As of 2019 Summer Universiade

=== Men ===
Rank	Nation	Gold	Silver	Bronze	Total
1	Japan (JPN)	7	0	3	10
2	Italy (ITA)	2	5	1	8
3	Ukraine (UKR)	2	1	0	3
4	South Korea (KOR)	1	5	1	7
5	France (FRA)	1	1	0	2
6	Czech Republic (CZE)	1	0	1	2
6	Mexico (MEX)	1	0	1	2
6	North Korea (PRK)	1	0	1	2
9	Soviet Union (URS)	1	0	0	1
9	Spain (ESP)	1	0	0	1
11	Great Britain (GBR)	0	2	1	3
12	Uruguay (URU)	0	2	0	2
13	Brazil (BRA)	0	1	2	3
14	Netherlands (NED)	0	1	0	1
15	China (CHN)	0	0	1	1
15	Germany (GER)	0	0	1	1
15	Morocco (MAR)	0	0	1	1
15	Romania (ROM)	0	0	1	1
15	Russia (RUS)	0	0	1	1
15	Thailand (THA)	0	0	1	1
15	United States (USA)	0	0	1	1
Totals (21 entries)		18	18	18	54

=== Women ===
Rank	Nation	Gold	Silver	Bronze	Total
1	Brazil (BRA)	3	0	3	6
2	North Korea (PRK)	3	0	0	3
3	China (CHN)	2	1	1	4
4	Great Britain (GBR)	1	0	1	2
4	South Korea (KOR)	1	0	1	2
6	France (FRA)	1	0	0	1
7	Japan (JPN)	0	5	2	7
8	Russia (RUS)	0	2	3	5
9	Mexico (MEX)	0	1	0	1
9	Netherlands (NED)	0	1	0	1
9	United States (USA)	0	1	0	1
Totals (11 entries)		11	11	11	33

=== Total ===
Rank	Nation	Gold	Silver	Bronze	Total
1	Japan	7	5	5	17
2	North Korea	4	0	1	5
3	Brazil	3	1	5	9
4	South Korea	2	5	2	9
5	Italy	2	5	1	8
6	China	2	1	2	5
7	France	2	1	0	3
7	Ukraine	2	1	0	3
9	Great Britain	1	2	2	5
10	Mexico	1	1	1	3
11	Czech Republic	1	0	1	2
12	Soviet Union	1	0	0	1
12	Spain	1	0	0	1
14	Russia	0	2	4	6
15	Netherlands	0	2	0	2
15	Uruguay	0	2	0	2
17	United States	0	1	1	2
18	Germany	0	0	1	1
18	Morocco	0	0	1	1
18	Romania	0	0	1	1
18	Thailand	0	0	1	1
Totals (21 entries)		29	29	29	87

== See also ==
- FIFA World Cup
- FIFA Women's World Cup
- Football at the Summer Olympics
- Football at the Youth Olympic Games
