= South Korea national football B team =

South Korean association football team

Republic of Korea B (Universiade)
- Nickname(s): Baekho (White tiger); Chungmu
- Association: Korea Football Association (KFA)
- Confederation: AFC (Asia)
- Sub-confederation: EAFF (East Asia)
First colours	Second colours

First international
- South Korea 3–1 Thailand (Kuala Lumpur, Malaya; 3 August 1961)

Biggest win
- South Korea 14–0 Guam (Busan, South Korea; 17 May 1997)

Biggest defeat
- South Korea 0–6 Japan (Kanazawa, Japan; 29 March 2014)

Asian Cup
- Appearances: 1 (first in 1964)
- Best result: Third place (1964)

Summer Universiade
- Appearances: 16 (first in 1979)
- Best result: Gold medalists (1991)

East Asian Games
- Appearances: 6 (first in 1993)
- Best result: Gold medalists (1993, 1997)
Medal record
Men's football
Summer Universiade
Gold medal – first place	1991 Sheffield
Silver medal – second place	1987 Zagreb
Silver medal – second place	1993 Buffalo
Silver medal – second place	1995 Fukuoka
Silver medal – second place	1997 Palermo
Silver medal – second place	2015 Gwangju
Bronze medal – third place	2001 Beijing
FISU World University Championships
Gold medal – first place	1976 Uruguay
AFC Asian Cup
Bronze medal – third place	1964 Israel
East Asian Games
Gold medal – first place	1993 Shanghai
Gold medal – first place	1997 Busan
Silver medal – second place	2001 Osaka
Silver medal – second place	2013 Tianjin
Bronze medal – third place	2009 Hong Kong

- South Korea national football B team
- Hangul: 대한민국 축구 국가대표 B팀
- Hanja: 大韓民國 蹴球 國家代表
- Revised Romanization: Daehanminguk Chukgu Gukga Daepyo B Tim
- McCune–Reischauer: Taehanmin'guk Ch'ukku Kukka Taep'yo B T'im

The South Korea national football B team (Korean: 대한민국 축구 국가대표 B팀) was the selection of South Korean semi-professional footballers and college footballers. Most of the members were playing at the Korean National Semipro League, the Korean National University League or the Korea National League. It was run as a reserve team of the South Korea national football team before the under-23 team was founded in the early 1990s.

It was reorganized as the South Korea Universiade football team (Korean: 대한민국 유니버시아드 축구 국가대표팀; recognized as Republic of Korea by FISU) after Asia's minor competitions were in decline. Professional and semi-professional players under 28 also could be selected for the Universiade team within two years of graduation from university. Since 2020, its players are mainly playing friendly matches including the Denso Cup due to the abolishment of the Universiade football.

== History ==
=== First world title ===
In August 1976, South Korean universities' national football team participated in the World University Football Championship, the football competition of the International University Sports Federation before the Universiade football was established. South Korea advanced to the knockout stage after defeating Brazil and Chile and drawing with France in the group stage. It also won against Senegal and the Netherlands in the quarter-finals and semi-finals respectively. In the final against Paraguay, South Korean forward Yoo Dong-choon scored the opening goal, but South Korea drew the first half after conceding a goal. During the second half, Cho Kwang-rae won a crucial penalty, and Paraguay gave up the match after two Paraguayan players who didn't accept the judgement were sent off for hitting the referee. This scene was a historic moment as South Korea won a world football competition for the first time, although it was not achieved in a professional tournament.

== Competitive record ==
Champions Runners-up Third place Tournament played on home soil

=== AFC Asian Cup ===
AFC Asian Cup record									Qualification record					
Year	Round	Pld	W	D	L	GF	GA	Squad	Pld	W	D	L	GF	GA
(Israel) 1964	Third place	3	1	0	2	2	4	Squad	Direct entry					
(Qatar) 1988	Entered with the "A" team								3	1	1	1	5	3
(Japan) 1992	Did not qualify								2	1	0	1	7	2
Total	Third place	3	1	0	2	2	4	—	5	2	1	2	12	5

=== Summer Universiade ===
Summer Universiade record
Year	Round	Pld	W	D	L	GF	GA
(Mexico) 1979	Fifth place	7	5	1	1	22	8
(Japan) 1985	Fifth place	5	3	2	0	23	9
(Socialist Federal Republic of Yugoslavia) 1987	Silver medalists	6	4	0	2	15	10
(United Kingdom) 1991	Gold medalists	6	4	2	0	15	5
(United States) 1993	Silver medalists	6	2	3	1	9	7
(Japan) 1995	Silver medalists	6	3	2	1	9	4
(Italy) 1997	Silver medalists	6	2	3	1	6	5
(Spain) 1999	Sixth place	5	2	1	2	12	11
(China) 2001	Bronze medalists	6	4	1	1	10	3
(South Korea) 2003	Ninth place	6	5	0	1	10	5
(Turkey) 2005	Fourteenth place	6	1	0	5	8	13
(Thailand) 2007	Did not qualify						
(Serbia) 2009	Sixth place	6	3	2	1	8	6
(China) 2011	Fifth place	6	3	2	1	7	3
(Russia) 2013	Did not qualify						
(South Korea) 2015	Silver medalists	6	5	0	1	12	5
(Chinese Taipei) 2017	Eleventh place	6	3	2	1	20	7
(Italy) 2019	Fifth place	5	2	1	2	8	9
Total	1 title	94	51	22	21	194	110

=== East Asian Games ===
East Asian Games record
Year	Round	Pld	W	D	L	GF	GA
(China) 1993	Gold medalists	5	4	1	0	29	1
(South Korea) 1997	Gold medalists	5	4	0	1	28	2
(Japan) 2001	Silver medalists (Note: South Korea finished third, but received the silver medal instead of Australia, the guests and runners-up.)	5	3	2	0	11	4
(Macau) 2005	Fourth place	4	1	0	3	4	8
(Hong Kong) 2009	Bronze medalists	4	1	1	2	6	7
(China) 2013	Silver medalists	4	2	1	1	8	4
Total	2 titles	27	15	5	7	86	26

== Honours ==
=== Intercontinental ===
- Summer Universiade

Gold medalists: 1991
Silver medalists: 1987, 1993, 1995, 1997, 2015
Bronze medalists: 2001

- FISU World University Championships

Champions: 1976

=== Continental ===
- AFC Asian Cup

Third place: 1964

=== Regional ===
- East Asian Games

Gold medalists: 1993, 1997
Silver medalists: 2001, 2013
Bronze medalists: 2009

=== Friendly competitions ===
- Jakarta Anniversary Tournament: 1976, 1978
- King's Cup: 1977
- SAFF International Tournament: 1978
- Merdeka Tournament: 1979, 1984, 1985
- Merlion Cup: 1992
- VFF Cup: 2012

== See also ==
- Football in South Korea
- Korea Football Association
- South Korea national football team
- South Korea national under-23 football team
- South Korea national under-20 football team
- South Korea national under-17 football team
- South Korea women's national football team
- Korea Cup
- U-League (association football)
