= Ahn Jung-hwan =

South Korean footballer (born 1976)

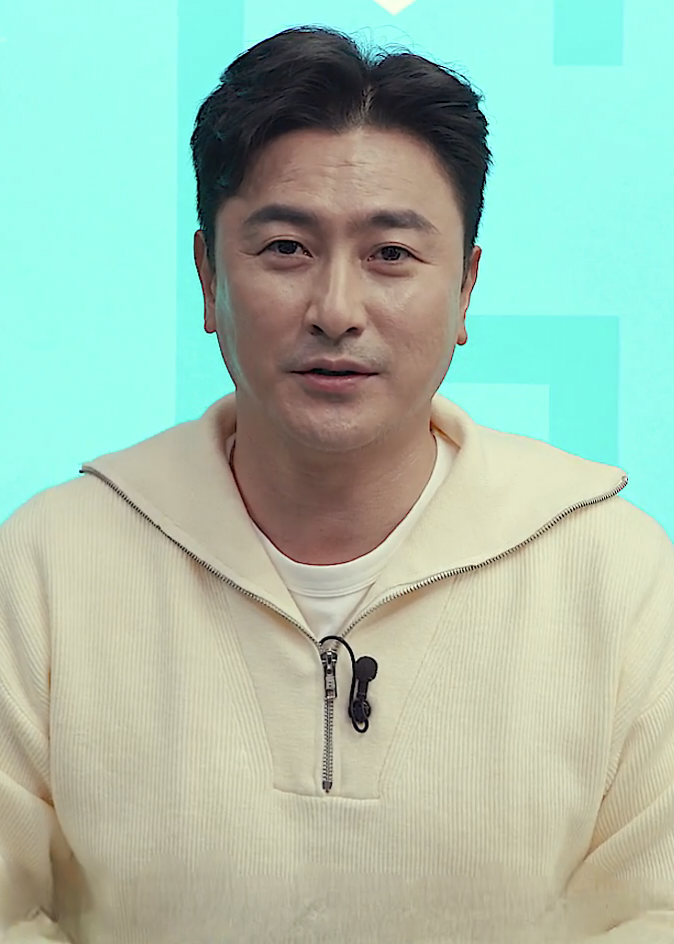
- Ahn in November 2021

Personal information
- Date of birth: 27 January 1976 (age 50)
- Place of birth: Paju, South Korea
- Height: 1.77 m (5 ft 10 in)
- Positions: Attacking midfielder; striker

Youth career
- ?–1990: Namseoul Middle School
- 1991–1993: Seoul Technical High School

College career
Years	Team	Apps	(Gls)
1994–1997	Ajou University		

Senior career*
Years	Team	Apps	(Gls)
1998–2002	Busan Daewoo Royals	54	(27)
2000–2002	→ Perugia (loan)	30	(5)
2002–2003	Shimizu S-Pulse	38	(14)
2004–2005	Yokohama F. Marinos	34	(16)
2005–2006	Metz	16	(2)
2006	MSV Duisburg	12	(2)
2007	Suwon Samsung Bluewings	15	(0)
2008	Busan IPark	19	(4)
2009–2011	Dalian Shide	65	(18)
Total		283	(88)

International career
1994	South Korea U20	4	(2)
1997	South Korea B		
1997–2010	South Korea	71	(17)
Medal record
Representing South Korea
Men's football
Summer Universiade
Silver medal – second place	1997 Sicily
EAFF Championship
Gold medal – first place	2003 Japan
East Asian Games
Gold medal – first place	1997 Busan
Korean name
Hangul	안정환
Hanja	安貞桓
RR	An Jeonghwan
MR	An Chŏnghwan
IPA	[ɐnd͡ʑʌŋɦwɐn]
- * Club domestic league appearances and goals

Ahn Jung-hwan (Korean: 안정환; born 27 January 1976) is a South Korean television personality and former professional footballer. A versatile forward known for his technical skills and clutch goalscoring, Ahn represented South Korea at three FIFA World Cups, notably scoring a golden goal against Italy in 2002. Following his retirement, Ahn transitioned into a successful career in broadcasting, becoming a popular football commentator and television host. He is also recognised for his philanthropic endeavors.

== Early life ==
Ahn was born on 27 January 1976 in Papyeong-myeon, Paju, Gyeonggi Province. He was raised primarily by his maternal grandmother while his mother worked, and grew up in financial hardship.

Ahn began playing organised football in the fourth grade at Bondong Elementary School in Seoul. He later recalled that he initially joined the school's football team because its players were given bread and milk, although his grandmother objected because he was already underfed. He transferred to Daerim Elementary School in the fifth grade and subsequently attended Namseoul Middle School and Seoul Technical High School. His performances at Namseoul attracted the attention of high-school coaches, but financial difficulties restricted his educational choices.

Financial considerations also influenced Ahn's choice of university, and he entered Ajou University in 1994, where he studied business administration. He played for Ajou's first team from his freshman year. Ajou won both the spring and autumn university football federation tournaments during his first season. That year, he was also selected for the South Korea under-19 team. Lee Young-pyo later recalled being struck by Ahn's ability when he first saw him as a university player, describing him as the leading striker in Korean university football.

In August 1997, Ahn represented South Korea's university team at the Summer Universiade in Sicily, where it won the silver medal. His cross set up Kim Dae-eui for the opening goal of South Korea's 2–1 quarter-final victory over Brazil. Soon afterwards, on 5 September, Ahn entered the final of the Autumn University Football Federation Tournament at half-time with Ajou trailing Hongik University 2–1. He assisted the equaliser and scored twice as Ajou produced four goals in seven minutes to win 5–2. In November 1997, Busan Daewoo Royals designated Ahn as an incoming player for the 1998 season.

== Club career ==
=== Busan Daewoo Royals ===
Ahn began his professional career with Busan Daewoo Royals in 1998. He scored a 59th-minute equalizer against Suwon Samsung Bluewings on his professional debut on 21 March, although Busan lost the opening Adidas Cup match in a penalty shoot-out. In his rookie season, Ahn recorded 13 goals and four assists in 33 K League and League Cup appearances. He scored four goals in each of the season's two League Cup competitions and helped Busan win the Philip Morris Korea Cup. Although he finished second to Lee Dong-gook in voting for Rookie of the Year, Ahn was selected to the K League Best XI as a midfielder. His performances and long-haired appearance earned him the nickname "Terius", and he emerged alongside Lee and Ko Jong-soo as one of the young stars associated with the K League's late-1990s attendance revival.

Ahn's attacking output increased in 1999, when he scored 21 goals and supplied seven assists in 34 K League and League Cup appearances. He shared the scoring lead in the Daehan Fire Insurance Cup with six goals, but a red card in the semifinal against Ulsan Hyundai suspended him for both matches of the final, which Busan lost to Suwon. During the league's regular season, he recorded 14 goals and five assists, including goals in seven consecutive appearances, before adding two assists in five championship playoff matches as Busan reached the final.

In the second championship match, Ahn assisted the opening goal, but Suwon won 2–1 in extra time after television replays showed that Saša Drakulić's winning goal had gone in off his arm. Busan consequently lost both championship matches by the same score and finished as league runner-up. Ahn nevertheless won the K League Most Valuable Player award with 44 of the 75 journalists' votes and was selected to the Best XI as a forward. He became the first player from a runner-up team to win the league's MVP award. Contemporary reports cited his scoring record, contribution to Busan and ability to attract spectators, while also identifying the controversy surrounding Drakulić's handball as a significant factor in the voting.

Following the financial difficulties of the Daewoo Group, HDC Hyundai Development Company acquired the club in February 2000 and relaunched it the following month as Pusan i.cons. Daewoo had previously agreed to pursue an overseas transfer if Ahn won the league's MVP or scoring title. The change in ownership initially stalled that plan, but the new management subsequently gave him written assurance that he could leave after June. On the field, Ahn scored twice in a 3–1 League Cup victory over Daejeon Citizen on 19 March and completed the domestic portion of the season with ten goals in 20 appearances—eight in 13 league matches and two in seven League Cup matches. On 27 July, he signed a one-year loan agreement with Italian Serie A club Perugia.

==== Loan to Perugia ====
Ahn became the first South Korean footballer to play in Serie A when he started Perugia's 1–1 draw with Lecce on 1 October 2000. His playing time was intermittent during the opening months as he adjusted to the league's physical and tactical demands and competed for selection with Perugia's other attacking players. Coach Serse Cosmi generally used a 3–5–2 formation with Zisis Vryzas and Luca Saudati as his principal forwards, sometimes introducing Ahn behind the two strikers when changing to a 3–4–1–2.

Ahn recorded his first Serie A assist in a 3–2 defeat to Bologna on 8 April 2001. On 22 April, he entered as a half-time substitute against Atalanta and scored a stoppage-time equalizer in a 2–2 draw, becoming the first South Korean to score in Serie A. The following week, he scored as Perugia recovered from three goals down to defeat Bari 4–3. He added two goals in a 3–3 draw with Udinese on 12 May and finished his first league season with four goals and one assist in 15 appearances.

Perugia renewed Ahn's loan in August 2001 under an agreement that included an option to acquire him permanently for $1.6 million. He remained a rotation player during the 2001–02 season. His only goal came after entering as a substitute against Verona on his 26th birthday, 27 January 2002; his header gave Perugia the lead in a 3–1 victory. Across his two seasons with Perugia, Ahn made 30 Serie A appearances, including 13 starts, and recorded five goals and one assist.

In a 2013 television interview, Ahn alleged that Perugia captain Marco Materazzi had once entered the dressing room and said in front of the other players that Ahn smelled of garlic. Materazzi later responded that commenting on Ahn's garlic-scented breath was not a racist insult and that he would have made the same remark to an Italian.

After Ahn scored South Korea's golden goal in its 2–1 victory over Italy in the 2002 FIFA World Cup round of 16, Perugia president Luciano Gaucci said that Ahn would never play for the club again and that he would not pay a player who had "ruined Italian soccer". A club spokesman added that Perugia had already been considering releasing Ahn before the match. Within a week, however, Perugia reversed its public position and claimed to have exercised its option to acquire Ahn permanently from Busan. Ahn rejected a return, saying that the club had attacked his character rather than congratulating him for his performance.

Ahn later said that Perugia had advised him not to return to Italy because of possible threats against his life and that his car there had been vandalized. In later interviews, he said that Italian newspaper reports had attributed threats against him to the Mafia; in 2026, he said that he had still not returned to the country.

Competing claims by Perugia and Busan I'Cons over Ahn's registration subsequently impeded his search for another club. In July 2002, the Korea Football Association said that FIFA's legal department had advised that resolving the dispute could take six to eight months and might prevent Ahn from transferring while it remained pending. Blackburn Rovers pursued Ahn and reportedly agreed terms with Perugia, but the proposed transfer collapsed after his British work-permit application was rejected. Ahn later disputed the publicly reported explanation, saying that his international record had been sufficient and that Blackburn withdrew because the ownership dispute created a risk that the club could acquire him but remain unable to register him. He later said that the uncertainty led him to consider ending his playing career.

On 2 September, Ahn's representatives announced an agreement under which the Japanese management company Professional Management would pay approximately US$1.2 million to each of Perugia and Busan to settle their competing claims. In return, the company would receive income from Ahn's Japanese advertising work and from subsequent loan or transfer fees. Ahn described the arrangement in 2026 as a ₩3.8 billion debt that he repaid from his earnings in Japan.

=== Shimizu S-Pulse ===
On 16 September 2002, Shimizu S-Pulse announced that it had reached an agreement with Professional Management for Ahn's move to the club. He signed a one-year contract two days later and received squad number 26. Ahn made his J1 debut away to Urawa Red Diamonds on 28 September, entering in the 56th minute of a 2–1 extra-time defeat. His first Shimizu goals came on 9 October, when he scored twice in a 7–0 2002–03 AFC Champions League qualifying victory over New Radiant.

Ahn scored his first J1 goal against Sanfrecce Hiroshima on 26 October and finished the 2002 league campaign with three goals in ten appearances. In the 2002 Emperor's Cup, he scored twice, including an extra-time golden goal, in a 3–2 fourth-round victory over Shonan Bellmare.

At the AFC Champions League group tournament in March 2003, Ahn scored against Seongnam Ilhwa Chunma and twice against Osotspa, although Shimizu failed to advance. In June, he completed four weeks of basic military training under the exemption granted to members of South Korea's 2002 World Cup squad. He scored 11 goals in 28 league appearances that season, including goals in four consecutive matches between 30 August and 20 September, and finished as Shimizu's leading league scorer.

Shimizu reached the semi-finals of both domestic cup competitions in 2003. Ahn scored the only goal of the first leg of their 2003 J.League Cup semi-final against Urawa, although Shimizu were eliminated after losing the return leg 6–1. In his final match for the club, he scored twice to erase a two-goal deficit against Júbilo Iwata in the Emperor's Cup semi-final, but Shimizu ultimately lost 4–2. Across two seasons with Shimizu, Ahn made 38 J1 appearances and scored 14 goals, in addition to two goals in five League Cup appearances.

=== Yokohama F. Marinos ===
In January 2004, Ahn joined defending J.League champions Yokohama F. Marinos from Shimizu S-Pulse on a one-year contract. Manager Takeshi Okada said that Yokohama had sought a forward who could provide a focal point against opponents defending deep. He later credited Ahn with adapting to the team's tactics and increasing his work rate.

Ahn scored seven goals in 13 appearances during the first stage of the 2004 J.League Division 1. He scored in each of its final four rounds, culminating in the only goal of a 1–0 victory over Kashima Antlers on 26 June that secured the stage championship for Yokohama. He added five goals in 12 second-stage appearances, including both goals in a 2–1 victory at Shimizu.

On 17 November, Ahn fractured his right ankle while playing for South Korea and required surgery. He consequently missed both legs of the J.League Championship, in which Yokohama retained the league title by defeating Urawa Red Diamonds 4–2 in a penalty shoot-out after the tie finished 1–1 on aggregate. His 12 league goals in 2004 were the highest total in the Yokohama squad.

Yokohama extended Ahn's contract for six months while he recovered. After returning to league play on 2 April 2005, he scored six goals in five consecutive competitive appearances between 6 and 20 April: two against BEC Tero Sasana in the 2005 AFC Champions League, league goals against Vissel Kobe, Kashiwa Reysol and Gamba Osaka, and another goal against BEC Tero. He finished the shortened league campaign with four goals in nine appearances.

Yokohama did not renew Ahn's contract when it expired on 30 June 2005. The following month, he returned to Europe by signing a one-year contract with FC Metz. His Yokohama league record was 34 appearances and 16 goals.

=== Metz ===
After leaving Yokohama F. Marinos, Ahn returned to European football in July 2005, signing a one-year contract with FC Metz of Ligue 1. The move was facilitated by Metz's existing youth-development relationship with the Korea Football Association, through which Ahn's agent was already working with Korean trainees at the club. Metz had sought a two-year agreement, but Ahn requested a one-year contract because he hoped eventually to play in Spain or England. He said that he chose France to experience a new league and had rejected better financial terms from Udinese, having already played in Italy.

Ahn made his Ligue 1 debut away to Paris Saint-Germain on 29 July. He entered in the 61st minute and scored shortly afterward from Ludovic Obraniak's pass, although Metz lost 4–1. By late November, he had gone three consecutive league matches without starting, while Metz had won only once in their first 15 matches and stood 19th in the table. His second and final league goal came on 10 December, when he scored a tenth-minute equalizer in a 1–1 draw at Sochaux. He finished his Metz spell with two goals in 16 Ligue 1 appearances.

Ahn later said that Metz had deployed him on the left side of midfield, a role he believed was unsuitable for both himself and the team. Former Metz players and officials later praised his technical ability but said that language and cultural differences hindered his integration with the squad. On 24 January 2006, he transferred to MSV Duisburg after the two clubs reached an agreement over his departure. Metz subsequently finished last in Ligue 1 and were relegated.

=== MSV Duisburg ===
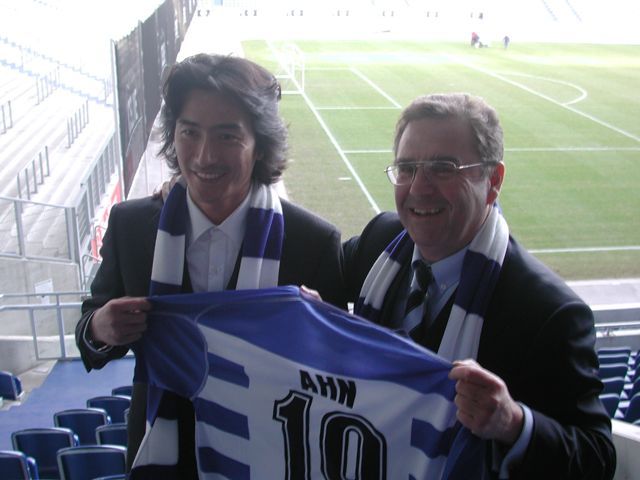
Ahn with MSV Duisburg in 2006

During the January 2006 transfer window, Ahn declined an invitation to undertake a three-day trial with Blackburn Rovers. His Korean representative said that Ahn was unwilling to attend without a clearer indication that the trial would lead to a transfer. On 24 January, he left Metz for relegation-threatened MSV Duisburg, signing a contract running until 2007. Contemporary reports described the agreement as a 17-month contract that allowed Ahn to determine his future if Duisburg were relegated. The club stood 17th and had scored a league-low 15 goals in 17 matches when it recruited him to strengthen its attack. Ahn's representatives said that playing in Germany would also allow him to acclimate to the host country before the 2006 FIFA World Cup.

Ahn made his Bundesliga debut four days after signing, entering in the 86th minute of a 1–0 away victory over VfB Stuttgart. He made his first start against Bayer Leverkusen on 18 February, when his cross set up Klemen Lavrič during a 3–2 defeat. Most of his subsequent appearances came as a substitute.

On 3 May, Ahn completed a Bundesliga match for the first time and scored his first goal in the competition during a 5–3 defeat to Werder Bremen. Three days later, he scored the opening goal in a 2–0 victory over Arminia Bielefeld. It was his final appearance for Duisburg. He finished with two goals in 12 Bundesliga appearances—three starts and nine as a substitute—as Duisburg finished last and were relegated to the 2. Bundesliga.

Following the World Cup, Ahn sought a transfer rather than accompany Duisburg into the second division. Heart of Midlothian manager Valdas Ivanauskas confirmed that Ahn was among several forwards under consideration, but no agreement was reached. After Ahn failed to secure another club during the summer transfer window, Duisburg terminated his remaining contract on 31 August, leaving him a free agent.

=== Suwon Samsung Bluewings ===
In January 2007, Ahn joined K League club Suwon Samsung Bluewings on a one-year deal. He initially showed promise, scoring a hat-trick in a League Cup match against Daejeon Citizen. However, his performance declined, and he was left out of the national team for the 2007 AFC Asian Cup.

While playing for the reserve team in a R League match to regain his ability, Ahn tried to get into the stand after being verbally abused by FC Seoul fans. He was subsequently ejected from the match and had to pay a fine.

Ahn's stint at Suwon was ultimately underwhelming, scoring 5 goals without a league goal in 25 appearances. He left the club at the end of the season.

=== Return to Busan ===
In 2008, Ahn returned to his former club, now known as Busan IPark. His performance at Busan was statistically not outstanding, but set an example for his teammates. Busan offered him a contract extension including the best treatment in the team after the season, but he looked forward to playing in one of foreign leagues, especially in Major League Soccer.

=== Dalian Shide ===
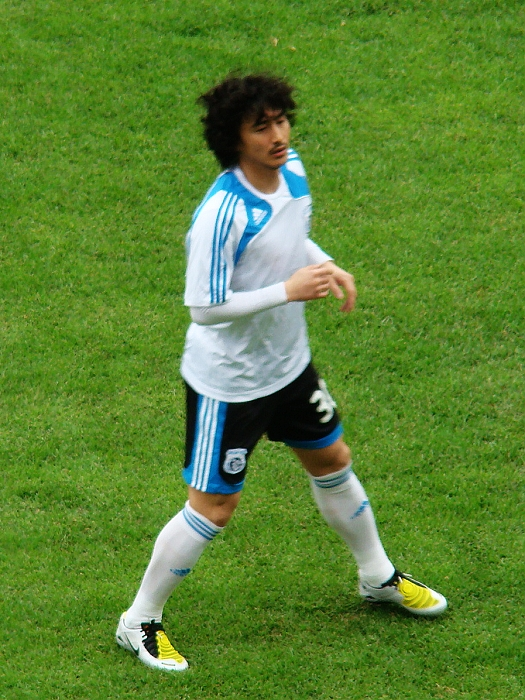
Ahn with Dalian Shide in 2009

On 20 March 2009, Ahn joined Chinese Super League side Dalian Shide on a seven-month contract until the end of the 2009 season. Quickly attracted to Ahn's performance, Dalian executives extended his contract for another year in less than three months. Despite his old age, he played a key role in Dalian's attack, becoming the team's top scorer in 2009 and 2010. Especially, Dalian reached fourth place in the league standing with three matches left of the 2010 season, approaching an AFC Champions League berth under his influence. However, a knee injury sidelined him for the last matches, and his team finished sixth after failing to earn any victories during his absence.

Ahn re-signed with Dalian for the 2011 season, but his prime was finished that year. On 29 October 2011, he wore the captain's armband in his last match at Dalian, and bade farewell to Dalian fans at half-time of the match. He announced his retirement as a player in January 2012.

== International career ==
=== Early career ===
Ahn represented the South Korea under-20 team at the 1994 AFC Youth Championship. He scored both of South Korea's goals in a 2–2 draw with Bahrain, but the team was eliminated in the group stage and failed to qualify for the 1995 FIFA World Youth Championship. He also won the silver medal with South Korea at the 1997 Summer Universiade.

Ahn made his debut for the senior national team on 23 April 1997, coming on as a substitute in a 2–0 friendly victory over China at the Workers' Stadium in Beijing. In December 1997, manager Cha Bum-kun omitted him from a preliminary squad for the upcoming 1998 FIFA World Cup. Ahn was not selected for the tournament despite his strong start to his professional career the following spring. He was also left out of the squad for the 1998 Asian Games, which was composed largely of players under the age cutoff for the 2000 Olympics.

His first senior international goal came on 12 June 1999 in a 1–1 draw with Mexico in the Korea Cup. He subsequently appeared in both of South Korea's matches at the 2000 CONCACAF Gold Cup. However, Ahn missed the 2000 AFC Asian Cup; one contemporary journalist attributed Ahn's omission to manager Huh Jung-moo's concerns about stamina and defensive contribution, as well as a desire to give him time to adapt to Italian football.

On 20 December 2000, Ahn scored in a 1–1 draw with Japan at the National Stadium in Tokyo as incoming national-team manager Guus Hiddink watched from the stands. He controlled a long pass on his chest, turned past two defenders and scored with a deflected right-footed shot.

After taking charge in 2001, Hiddink was initially reluctant to select Ahn because of his limited playing time at Perugia. Hiddink emphasised that Ahn needed regular competitive football and left him out of the 2001 FIFA Confederations Cup.

=== 2002 World Cup ===
Leading up to the 2002 FIFA World Cup, Ahn regained Hiddink's trust by improving his conditioning. In a warm-up match against Scotland on 16 May, Ahn replaced Hwang Sun-hong at half-time, then scored twice and set up another goal in a 4–1 victory. A 2020 retrospective described Ahn's second goal, a first-time chip over the goalkeeper, as the technically finest goal in South Korean football history.

Ahn began the World Cup as Hwang's deputy, replacing him in South Korea's first two group matches. In the match against the United States on 10 June, he came on for Hwang, who had suffered a cut above his eye, and scored a glancing header from Lee Eul-yong's free kick in the 78th minute to secure a 1–1 draw. His speed-skating celebration referred to Kim Dong-sung's controversial disqualification in the men's 1,500-metre short-track final at the 2002 Winter Olympics, which had given American Apolo Ohno the gold medal. With Hwang still affected by the injury, Ahn started the 1–0 victory over Portugal that secured South Korea's place in the knockout stage.

Ahn then started the round-of-16 match against Italy on 18 June but had an early penalty saved by Gianluigi Buffon. Italy led until Seol Ki-hyeon equalised in the 88th minute. In the 117th minute, Ahn outjumped Paolo Maldini to head in Lee Young-pyo's cross for the golden goal, giving South Korea a 2–1 victory and a place in the quarter-finals. He celebrated by kissing his wedding ring in tribute to his wife, Lee Hye-won.

Ahn also converted his penalty in the quarter-final against Spain on 22 June. South Korea won the shoot-out 5–3 after a goalless draw and advanced to the semi-finals. Ahn injured his left ankle in that match and appeared as a second-half substitute in the semi-final defeat by Germany. In the third-place match, he had a first-half goal disallowed for offside as South Korea lost 3–2 to Turkey. Ahn finished the tournament with two goals in seven appearances as South Korea placed fourth.

=== 2003 East Asian Championship and 2004 Asian Cup ===
On 31 May 2003, Ahn scored the late winner in a 1–0 friendly victory over Japan in Tokyo, securing Humberto Coelho's first win as South Korea manager. Following a request from the Korea Football Association and appeals from supporters, the Ministry of National Defense granted him leave from basic military training to play in the friendly against Argentina on 11 June. In December, he helped South Korea win the inaugural East Asian Football Championship, scoring the third goal in a 3–1 victory over Hong Kong.

At the 2004 AFC Asian Cup, Ahn started the goalless opening match against Jordan and came off the bench in South Korea's remaining three matches. He scored in stoppage time to complete a 2–0 victory over the United Arab Emirates, then added a long-range goal in the 4–0 win over Kuwait that secured first place in the group. South Korea were eliminated after losing 4–3 to Iran in the quarter-finals.

=== 2006 World Cup ===
Ahn appeared as a substitute in all three of South Korea's matches at the 2006 FIFA World Cup. In the opening game against Togo on 13 June, he replaced defender Kim Jin-kyu at half-time with South Korea trailing 1–0. After Lee Chun-soo equalised from a free kick, Ahn scored the winner in the 72nd minute with a deflected shot from outside the penalty area. Ahn was named FIFA's man of the match. The 2–1 victory was South Korea's first World Cup win on foreign soil. The goal made him the first Asian player to score three times at World Cup finals.

Ahn also helped create South Korea's equaliser in the 1–1 draw with France. His pass released Seol Ki-hyeon on the right; Seol's cross was then headed back across goal by Cho Jae-jin for Park Ji-sung to score. However, a 2–0 defeat by Switzerland in the final group match ended South Korea's tournament.

=== Last appearances and retirement ===
Ahn was omitted from Pim Verbeek's squad for the 2007 AFC Asian Cup after struggling for form at Suwon Samsung Bluewings. In May 2008, Huh Jung-moo recalled him for World Cup qualifiers, ending a 21-month absence from the squad. After another period out of the team, he returned in the 2–0 friendly victory over Ivory Coast at Loftus Road in London on 3 March 2010, his first international appearance since June 2008. Huh intended to use him as an impact substitute in attack.

Ahn's World Cup preparations were disrupted by stiffness in his back muscles, which restricted his training and caused him to miss the May friendly against Japan. He was nevertheless selected for his third successive World Cup squad in 2010. During the tournament, he said that this would be his last national-team campaign. He remained on the bench throughout South Korea's four matches as they reached the round of 16. After the tournament, assistant coach Jung Hae-seong praised Ahn and Lee Woon-jae for supporting and encouraging their teammates despite not playing.

In a 2020 interview, Huh said that Ahn had not regained sufficient match fitness to be used in the round-of-16 match against Uruguay. Ahn said in 2022 that he had felt capable of making a decisive contribution in that match and was disappointed not to play, although he welcomed the opportunity given to fellow veteran striker Lee Dong-gook. In a 2026 newspaper column, Ahn recalled packing his bags during the tournament before changing his mind and deciding to stay with the team.

His final international appearance was in a pre-tournament friendly match against Spain on 3 June 2010, and he finished his senior international career with 71 appearances and 17 goals. Ahn retired from playing on 31 January 2012. A farewell ceremony was held at half-time of South Korea's World Cup qualifier against Kuwait at Seoul World Cup Stadium on 29 February.

== Style of play ==
Ahn's technical gifts for passing, dribbling and shooting based on two-footed ability could deploy him in any attacking position, and led him to be called the "fantasista" in South Korea. He looked comfortable when playing as an attacking midfielder, but also could play as a winger or striker. However, he had some drawbacks such as lack of physical strength and defensive contribution.

"Ahn was a rare type of player in our country. His skills were impossible for me, and were not behind European players. He showed Korean players also can play technical football." – Park Ji-sung

== After retirement ==
After retiring from professional football, Ahn has worked as a television personality. He is considered one of the most successful athletes-turned-comedians in South Korea, alongside Kang Ho-dong and Seo Jang-hoon. He has also hosted some television shows including Please Take Care of My Refrigerator.

Ahn has worked as a football commentator, and has provided live commentaries of South Korea's football matches broadcast by Munhwa Broadcasting Corporation since 2014.

In 2012, Ahn was appointed an honorary ambassador for the K League. He toured all 16 stadiums of K League clubs and invited his teammates at the 2002 World Cup to the K League All-Star Game. He was acclaimed for his enthusiastic publicity campaign.

Ahn was one of the carriers of the Olympic flame at the opening of the 2018 Winter Olympics.

Ahn, who steadily volunteered his services and donations since becoming footballer, was appointed an honorary ambassador for Save the Children in 2019. Until 2023, he donated ₩300 million, the profits from his YouTube channel, to Save the Children and participated in various charity activities.

In 2021, Ahn co-founded entertainment company "Moongchin Project".

In October 2024, he participated in the Nexon Icon Match in Korea as a striker team.

== Personal life ==
Ahn, who married former Miss Korea Lee Hye-won in 2001, has one daughter and one son. He was nicknamed The Lord of the Ring after kissing his wedding ring whenever he celebrated his goal, and his celebration became fashionable among South Koreans at the time.

Ahn is widely regarded as one of the most handsome footballers in South Korea. Before his retirement, his face was frequently compared with South Korean actors and appeared in various television advertisements.

== Career statistics ==
=== Club ===
Appearances and goals by club, season and competition
Club	Season	League			National cup		League cup		Continental		Total	
Club	Season	Division	Apps	Goals	Apps	Goals	Apps	Goals	Apps	Goals	Apps	Goals
Busan Daewoo Royals	1998	K League	17	5	0	0	16	8			33	13
Busan Daewoo Royals	1999	K League	24	14	1	0	10	7			35	21
Busan Daewoo Royals	2000	K League	13	8	0	0	7	2	—		20	10
Busan Daewoo Royals	Total		54	27	1	0	33	17			88	44
Perugia	2000–01	Serie A	15	4	1	0	—		—		16	4
Perugia	2001–02	Serie A	15	1	2	0	—		—		17	1
Perugia	Total		30	5	3	0	—		—		33	5
Shimizu S-Pulse	2002	J1 League	10	3	3	2	1	0	1	2	15	7
Shimizu S-Pulse	2003	J1 League	28	11	4	3	4	2	3	3	39	19
Shimizu S-Pulse	Total		38	14	7	5	5	2	4	5	54	26
Yokohama F. Marinos	2004	J1 League	25	12	1	1	1	0	4	3	31	16
Yokohama F. Marinos	2005	J1 League	9	4	0	0	0	0	3	3	12	7
Yokohama F. Marinos	Total		34	16	1	1	1	0	7	6	43	23
Metz	2005–06	Ligue 1	16	2	0	0	0	0	—		16	2
MSV Duisburg	2005–06	Bundesliga	12	2	—		—		—		12	2
MSV Duisburg	2006–07	2. Bundesliga	0	0	—		—		—		0	0
MSV Duisburg	Total		12	2	—		—		—		12	2
Suwon Samsung Bluewings	2007	K League	15	0	1	0	10	5	—		26	5
Busan IPark	2008	K League	19	4	1	0	8	2	—		28	6
Dalian Shide	2009	Chinese Super League	26	6	—		—		—		26	6
Dalian Shide	2010	Chinese Super League	24	10	—		—		—		24	10
Dalian Shide	2011	Chinese Super League	15	2	0	0	—		—		15	2
Dalian Shide	Total		65	18	0	0	—		—		65	18
Career total			283	88	14	6	57	26	11	11	365	131

=== International ===
Appearances and goals by national team and year
National team	Year	Apps	Goals
South Korea	1997	3	0
South Korea	1999	4	1
South Korea	2000	5	1
South Korea	2001	4	0
South Korea	2002	13	5
South Korea	2003	7	2
South Korea	2004	15	5
South Korea	2005	6	1
South Korea	2006	8	2
South Korea	2008	3	0
South Korea	2010	3	0
Career total		71	17

Results list South Korea's goal tally first.

List of international goals scored by Ahn Jung-hwan
No.	Date	Venue	Cap	Opponent	Score	Result	Competition
1	12 June 1999	Seoul, South Korea	5	Mexico	1–1	1–1	1999 Korea Cup
2	20 December 2000	Tokyo, Japan	12	Japan	1–0	1–1	Friendly
3	16 May 2002	Busan, South Korea	20	Scotland	2–0	4–1	Friendly
4	16 May 2002	Busan, South Korea	20	Scotland	4–1	4–1	Friendly
5	10 June 2002	Daegu, South Korea	23	United States	1–1	1–1	2002 FIFA World Cup
6	18 June 2002	Daejeon, South Korea	25	Italy	2–1	2–1 (a.e.t.)	2002 FIFA World Cup
7	20 November 2002	Seoul, South Korea	29	Brazil	2–1	2–3	Friendly
8	31 May 2003	Tokyo, Japan	32	Japan	1–0	1–0	Friendly
9	4 December 2003	Tokyo, Japan	34	Hong Kong	3–1	3–1	2003 EAFF Championship
10	14 February 2004	Ulsan South Korea	37	Oman	3–0	5–0	Friendly
11	14 February 2004	Ulsan South Korea	37	Oman	4–0	5–0	Friendly
12	9 June 2004	Daejeon, South Korea	43	Vietnam	1–0	2–0	2006 FIFA World Cup qualification
13	23 July 2004	Jinan, China	46	United Arab Emirates	2–0	2–0	2004 AFC Asian Cup
14	27 July 2004	Jinan, China	47	Kuwait	4–0	4–0	2004 AFC Asian Cup
15	12 November 2005	Seoul, South Korea	56	Sweden	1–0	2–2	Friendly
16	13 June 2006	Frankfurt, Germany	62	Togo	2–1	2–1	2006 FIFA World Cup
17	16 August 2006	Taipei, Republic of China	65	Chinese Taipei	1–0	3–0	2007 AFC Asian Cup qualification

== Filmography ==
=== Television ===
Year	Title	Role	Note(s)	Ref.
2013	Law of the Jungle in Himalayas	Himself		
2014	World Cup Special Drawing Dream	Himself	Host	
2014–2015	Dad! Where Are We Going?	Himself		
2015	Cheongchun FC Hungry Eleven	Himself		
2015	Guide	Himself		
2015	The Human Condition	Himself		
2016	Future Diary	Himself	Host	
2016–2019	Please Take Care of My Refrigerator	Himself	Host	
2016	Cook Representative	Himself	Host	
2016–2017	My Little Television	Himself		
2016–2018	Carefree Travellers	Himself	Host	
2016–2017	Flower Crew	Himself		
2018	Creaking Heroes	Himself		
2018	1 Percent of Friendship	Himself	Host	
2018–2019	Cool Kids	Himself		
2019–2021	Let's Play Soccer	Himself		
2020	Will They Eat When Delivered?	Himself		
2020–2023	Buddy into the Wild	Himself		
2021	Let's Play Basketball	Himself		
2021	National Bang Bang Cook Cook	Himself		
2021	Lanson Marketplace	Himself		
2021	Why Is Classical 2	Himself	Host	
2021–2023	Let's Play Soccer 2	Himself		
2021	My Name Is Caddy	Himself	Host	
2022	Legend Festival	Himself	Host	
2022	Brave Detectives	Himself		
2022	Hole-in-one between Legends	Himself		
2022	Neighborhood Billiards	Himself	Host	
2022	IT Live from Today	Himself	Host	
2022–2023	Brave Detectives 2	Himself		
2022	Ahn Jung-hwan's Hidden Qatar	Himself		
2023	Rural Police Returns	Himself		
2023–present	Brave Detectives 3	Himself		
2023–present	Let's Play Soccer 3	Himself		
2023–present	Rural Police Returns 2	Himself		

=== Music video ===
Year	Title	Artist	Ref.
1999	"Already Sad Love"	Yada	

== Honours ==
=== Player ===
Busan Daewoo Royals

- Korean League Cup: 1998

Yokohama F. Marinos

- J1 League: 2004

South Korea B

- Summer Universiade silver medal: 1997
- East Asian Games: 1997

South Korea

- EAFF Championship: 2003

Individual

- K League All-Star: 1998, 1999
- K League 1 Best XI: 1998, 1999
- K League 1 Most Valuable Player: 1999
- FIFA World Cup Fans' All-Star Team: 2002
- Korean FA Fans' Player of the Year: 2003

=== Television personality ===
List of awards and nominations received by TV personality Ahn Jung-hwan
Award ceremony	Year	Category	Nominated work	Result	Ref.
MBC Entertainment Awards	2014	Special Award in a Variety Show	Dad! Where Are We Going?	Won	
MBC Entertainment Awards	2019	Popularity Award in Variety Show	Broadcasting By Your Side	Won	
MBC Entertainment Awards	2019	Best Couple Award (Note: Nominated with Kim Sung-joo.)	Broadcasting By Your Side	Nominated	
MBC Entertainment Awards	2020	Excellence Award in Variety Show	Buddies in the Wild	Nominated	
MBC Entertainment Awards	2021	Top Excellence Award in Variety Show	Buddies in the Wild	Won	
MBC Entertainment Awards	2022	Grand Prize	Buddies in the Wild; Ahn Jung-hwan's Hidden Qatar	Nominated	
MBC Entertainment Awards	2022	Entertainer of the Year Award	Buddies in the Wild; Ahn Jung-hwan's Hidden Qatar	Won	
MBC Entertainment Awards	2022	Best Couple Award	Ahn Jung-hwan's Hidden Qatar	Nominated	
SBS Entertainment Awards	2013	Best Challenge Award	Law of the Jungle in Himalayas	Won	
SBS Entertainment Awards	2016	Excellence Award in Variety Show	Flower Crew	Nominated	

Awards
Preceded by Ko Jong-soo	K-League Most Valuable Player; 1999	Succeeded by Choi Yong-soo
