= Lee Lim-saeng =

South Korean footballer (born 1971)

Personal information
- Full name: Lee Lim-saeng
- Date of birth: 18 November 1971 (age 54)
- Place of birth: Incheon, South Korea
- Height: 1.82 m (5 ft 11 1/2 in)
- Position: Defender

Team information
- Current team: Nagaworld (technical director)

Youth career
- 1987–1989: Bupyeong High School

College career
Years	Team	Apps	(Gls)
1990–1993	Korea University		

Senior career*
Years	Team	Apps	(Gls)
1994–2002	Bucheon SK	146	(8)
2003	Busan I'Cons	29	(0)
Total		175	(8)

International career
1990	South Korea U20		
1991	Korea U20	3	(0)
1991–1996	South Korea U23	20 (Note: Includes five appearances against non-national teams, and four appearances as an overage player (two appearances in Summer Olympics, two appearances in friendlies).)	(0)
1993	South Korea B		
1992–2002	South Korea	26	(0)

Managerial career
- 2010–2014: Home United
- 2015: Shenzhen FC
- 2016: Yanbian Fude
- 2017: Tianjin TEDA
- 2019–2020: Suwon Samsung Bluewings
Medal record
Representing South Korea
Men's football
Summer Universiade
Silver medal – second place	1993 Buffalo
AFC Youth Championship
Winner	1990 َIndonesia
- * Club domestic league appearances and goals

- Lee Lim-saeng
- Hangul: 이임생
- Hanja: 李林生
- RR: I Imsaeng
- MR: I Imsaeng

Lee Lim-saeng (born November 18, 1971) is a South Korean former footballer who played as a defender. He is currently the technical director of Cambodian Premier League club Nagaworld.

== Playing career ==
Lee mostly played his club career for K League club Bucheon SK, and won three Korean League Cups. He also played for South Korean national team at the 1998 FIFA World Cup.

== Managerial career ==
On 26 December 2009, Lee was appointed head coach of Singaporean club Home United. The club finished the S.League twice as runners-up, and won the Singapore Cup twice. On 5 December 2014, he resigned from the club.

On 12 April 2015, Lee started to manage China League One club Shenzhen F.C., who sacked predecessor Li Yi at the time. Lee was replaced by fitness coach Li Haiqiang on 27 August after bringing 17 points in 19 league matches.

Lee worked as a coach at Chinese Super League club Yanbian Funde under manager Park Tae-ha during the 2016 season before joining the same league's Tianjin TEDA as a coach and reserve team manager. On 2 June 2017, he was promoted to caretaker manager, succeeding Jaime Pacheco. On 7 July, he signed a permanent contract with the club despite gaining only one win in five matches. He failed to get a win in six subsequent matches until resigning on 14 August.

On 3 December 2018, Lee became manager of K League 1 club Suwon Samsung Bluewings. In 2019, his team finished eighth among 12 clubs at the league, but won a Korean FA Cup title. On 17 July 2020, he resigned from Suwon due to his poor results during the 2020 season.

== Administrative career ==
Lee worked as a technical director at the Korea Football Association between November 2017 and June 2018. On 18 January 2023, he returned to the association's same position. He was not a member of the committee in charge of finding a new manager of the national team, but was instructed to negotiate with foreign candidates by president Chung Mong-gyu in June 2024. He traveled to Spain and Germany early in July, meeting Gus Poyet and David Wagner respectively. Just after coming back to South Korea, however, he went straight to a neighborhood, where Ulsan HD manager Hong Myung-bo was living, and one-sidedly begged Hong to manage the national team. His attitude towards Hong was in contrast with his examination of the two foreign candidates, who gave their presentations, and he was greatly criticised for his cronyism. He also did not notify the candidates of the result before announcing Hong's appointment, causing more controversy.

Had been inspected by South Korea government, Lee worked at Cha Bum-kun's football academy until June 2026 after leaving the association in 2025. He left for Cambodia two weeks after South Korea managed by Hong was eliminated in the group stage at the 2026 FIFA World Cup. He joined Cambodian Premier League club Nagaworld as a technical director at the same time.

== Career statistics ==
=== Club ===
Appearances and goals by club, season and competition
Club	Season	League			National Cup		League Cup		Total	
Club	Season	Division	Apps	Goals	Apps	Goals	Apps	Goals	Apps	Goals
Bucheon SK	1994	K League	13	0	—		0	0	13	0
Bucheon SK	1995	K League	18	0	—		6	0	24	0
Bucheon SK	1996	K League	17	0	?	?	5	0	22	0
Bucheon SK	1997	K League	0	0	?	?	2	0	2	0
Bucheon SK	1998	K League	17	0	?	?	9	0	26	0
Bucheon SK	1999	K League	25	2	?	?	9	0	34	2
Bucheon SK	2000	K League	29	3	?	?	10	2	39	5
Bucheon SK	2001	K League	3	1	?	?	8	0	11	1
Bucheon SK	2002	K League	24	2	?	?	5	1	29	3
Bucheon SK	Total		146	8	?	?	54	3	200	11
Busan I'Cons	2003	K League	29	0	0	0	—		29	0
Career total			175	8	?	?	54	3	229	11

== Honours ==
=== Player ===
Bucheon SK

- Korean League Cup: 1994, 1996, 2000+

South Korea U20

- AFC Youth Championship: 1990

South Korea B

- Summer Universiade silver medal: 1993

Individual

- K League All-Star: 1998, 1999, 2000, 2002
- K League 1 Best XI: 1998, 2000

=== Manager ===
Home United

- Singapore Cup: 2011, 2013

Suwon Samsung Bluewings

- Korean FA Cup: 2019

Individual

- Korean FA Cup Best Manager: 2019
