= Hong Myung-bo =

South Korean footballer and manager

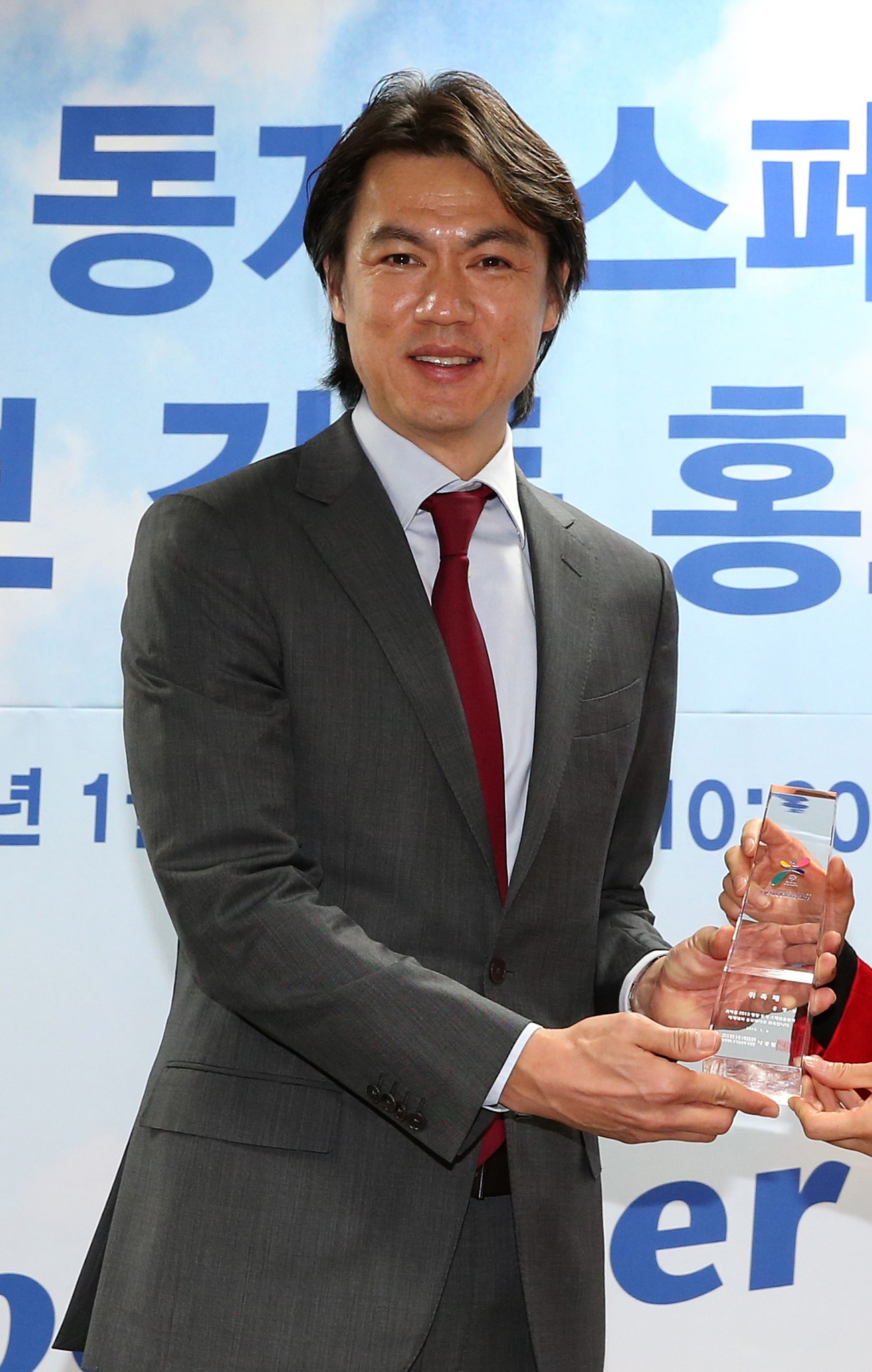
- Hong in 2013

Personal information
- Date of birth: 12 February 1969 (age 57)
- Place of birth: Seoul, South Korea
- Height: 1.81 m (5 ft 11 in)
- Position: Sweeper

Youth career
- 1981–1983: Kwanghee Middle School
- 1984–1986: Dongbuk High School

College career
Years	Team	Apps	(Gls)
1987–1990	Korea University		

Senior career*
Years	Team	Apps	(Gls)
1991	Sangmu FC (draft)		
1992–1997	Pohang Steelers	110	(14)
1997–1998	Bellmare Hiratsuka	42	(0)
1999–2001	Kashiwa Reysol	72	(7)
2002	Pohang Steelers	19	(0)
2003–2004	LA Galaxy	38	(0)
Total		281	(21)

International career
2000	South Korea U23	1 (Note: Appearance as an overage player in a friendly)	(0)
1991	South Korea B		
1990–2002	South Korea	136	(10)

Managerial career
- 2009: South Korea U20
- 2009–2012: South Korea U23
- 2013–2014: South Korea
- 2015–2017: Hangzhou Greentown
- 2020–2024: Ulsan HD
- 2024–2026: South Korea
Medal record
Men's football
Representing South Korea (as player)
Summer Universiade
Gold medal – first place	1991 Sheffield
Asian Games
Bronze medal – third place	1990 Beijing
AFC Asian Cup
Bronze medal – third place	2000 Lebanon
Representing South Korea (as manager)
Olympic Games
Bronze medal – third place	2012 London
Asian Games
Bronze medal – third place	2010 Guangzhou
EAFF Championship
Runner-up	2025 South Korea
Bronze medal – third place	2013 South Korea
- * Club domestic league appearances and goals

- Hong Myung-bo
- Hangul: 홍명보
- Hanja: 洪明甫
- RR: Hong Myeongbo
- MR: Hong Myŏngbo

Hong Myung-bo (Korean: 홍명보, Hanja: 洪明甫; Korean: [hoŋmjʌŋbo]; born 12 February 1969) is a former South Korean football manager and former footballer who played as a sweeper. He was most recently the head coach of the South Korea national football team.

He participated at four consecutive FIFA World Cups between 1990 and 2002, becoming the first Asian player to do so. He also received the Bronze Ball at the 2002 FIFA World Cup, becoming the first Asian to receive an individual award at the World Cup. He received some votes in elections for the FIFA World Player of the Year, finishing 21st in 1996 and 17th in 2002. In 2004, he was selected for the FIFA 100 by Pelé.

== International career ==
=== 1990 World Cup ===
Hong was selected for the South Korea national team for the 1990 FIFA World Cup just four months after his international debut. The youngest player at the team, he was one of the few South Koreans to be acclaimed, while they lost all three group stage matches.

=== 1994 World Cup ===
Hong was selected for the South Korea Universiade team for the 1991 tournament. He stabilised his team's defense, helping them advance to the final. After a goalless draw with the Netherlands in the final, he scored his team's first penalty in a 5–4 penalty shoot-out win, contributing to winning the tournament.

Hong's talent started to receive attention internationally at the 1994 FIFA World Cup. During the last five minutes of South Korea's opener against Spain, he converted opponents' 2–0 lead into a 2–2 draw by scoring a goal outside the penalty area and providing an assist for Seo Jung-won's equaliser. He once again scored a long-range goal in a 3–2 defeat to defending champions Germany.

=== 1998 World Cup ===
Hong participated at the 1994 Asian Games after the World Cup, but he injured his knee during a quarter-final match against Japan. South Korea lost to Uzbekistan in the semi-finals after he quit the competition.

While Park Jong-hwan managed South Korea from 1995 to 1996, Hong was suspected of being in conflict with Park, who had a coercive disposition. The press reported that Hong formed a faction at the national team, and doubted whether Hong did his best at the 1996 AFC Asian Cup, where South Korea was eliminated after a 6–2 quarter-final defeat to Iran.

Under Cha Bum-kun, the next manager, South Korea had one draw and two defeats including a 5–0 defeat to the Netherlands in the group stage of the 1998 FIFA World Cup. Hong and his teammates conceded nine goals in three matches.

=== 2002 World Cup ===
Hong was going to be selected as an overage player of the South Korea under-23 team for the 2000 Summer Olympics, but he was injured just before the tournament.

At the 2000 AFC Asian Cup, where South Korea finished third, Hong captained the national team, and was selected for the All-Star Team.

Hong led South Korea to a historic fourth-place finish at the 2002 FIFA World Cup. He commanded South Korea's defensive line, which conceded only three goals until the semi-finals, and scored the final penalty to secure a 5–3 shoot-out win in a quarter-final match against Spain. Despite his error in the third place match against Turkey, which was followed by the fastest goal in World Cup history, the Technical Study Group voted him as the third best player of the tournament, giving the Bronze Ball to him. He became the first-ever Asian player to be named one of the top three players at a World Cup.

That year, Hong ended his international career after a friendly match against World Cup champions Brazil. He was South Korea's all-time leader in appearances with 136 caps at the time, and his record was broken by Son Heung-min in 2025.

== Style of play ==
Hong did not have rapid pace, untiring stamina or outstanding ability in man-to-man defense, but he possessed a wide field of vision as well as great leadership skills with which he marshalled his defensive partners. An offensive sweeper, he was noted for his accurate long-range passing skills which greatly contributed to South Korea's attack. He was nicknamed the "Eternal Libero" by the South Korean media, and became a preeminent icon of South Korean football during his era.

== Managerial career ==
=== South Korea ===
On 26 September 2005, after his retirement as a player, Hong returned to the national team as an assistant coach. He took part in the 2006 FIFA World Cup, helping manager Dick Advocaat. He also worked with the next manager Pim Verbeek at the 2007 AFC Asian Cup. After Verbeek's resignation, he was one of the candidates to become the next manager.

On 19 February 2009, the Korea Football Association (KFA) announced that they had appointed Hong as the manager of the South Korea under-20 team. At the 2009 FIFA U-20 World Cup, the team reached the quarter-finals under his guidance, but lost 3–2 to eventual champions Ghana in the quarter-finals.

In October 2009, he took over duties as a manager of the South Korea under-23 team. He won bronze at both the 2010 Asian Games and the 2012 Summer Olympics. He achieved South Korea's first-ever Olympic medal in football, also known as Asia's second.

After working as assistant coach to Guus Hiddink at Russian Premier League club Anzhi Makhachkala for half a year, on 24 June 2013, Hong was appointed South Korea's manager. His predecessor Choi Kang-hee resigned voluntarily at the end of the 2014 FIFA World Cup qualification, and he started to prepare the 2014 FIFA World Cup, which was going to be held after a year. After a winless World Cup campaign, on 10 July 2014, he resigned from his post.

=== Hangzhou Greentown ===
On 17 December 2015, Hong was appointed manager of Chinese Super League club Hangzhou Greentown. In his first match on 6 March 2016, he guided the club to a 2–1 win over Changchun Yatai. However, his team was relegated to the China League One after the 2016 season. The next year, he resigned from the club and criticised the club's owner for interfering in tactics and selection of players.

=== Ulsan Hyundai ===
On 24 December 2020, Hong became the manager of K League 1 club Ulsan Hyundai. He led Ulsan to win two consecutive league titles in 2022 and 2023.

=== Return to South Korea ===
On 8 July 2024, Hong was controversially reappointed as South Korea's manager. KFA president Chung Mong-gyu, who preferred foreign managers to domestic managers, attempted to interfere in the selection process, but Hong's appointment was supported by executives and committeemen, much to the surprise and dismay of fans. He guided South Korea into qualifying for the 2026 FIFA World Cup without a loss in the qualifiers, but produced inconsistent results in friendlies against World Cup participants prior to the tournament.

At the 2026 World Cup, South Korea produced a comeback win against Czech Republic 2–1, their first opening game win at the World Cup since 2010. However, opposing managers easily countered Hong's stubborn tactics, resulting in South Korea shiftlessly losing 1–0 to both Mexico and South Africa. His lack of tactical change prompted anger and fierce criticism from South Korean media and fans, in particular, not starting captain Son Heung-min in the final game against South Africa. On 28 June 2026, Hong resigned under intense fire from his compatriots, including South Korean president Lee Jae Myung, as restaurants barred him from entering. Hong eventually left the country for Los Angeles. However, some Korean-owned restaurants posted signs denying him service over his disastrous managerial stint.

== Personal life ==
In 1997, Hong married a woman five years his junior, and has two sons.

== Career statistics ==
=== Club ===
Appearances and goals by club, season and competition
Club	Season	League			National cup		League cup		Continental		Total	
Club	Season	Division	Apps	Goals	Apps	Goals	Apps	Goals	Apps	Goals	Apps	Goals
Sangmu FC (draft)	1991	National Semipro League			(Note: Appearance(s) in Korean National Championship, Korean President's Cup)		(Note: Appearance(s) in Korean National Semipro Championship)		—			
Pohang Steelers	1992	K League	29	1	—		8	0	—		37	1
Pohang Steelers	1993	K League	11	1	—		1	0	—		12	1
Pohang Steelers	1994	K League	17	4	—		0	0	—		17	4
Pohang Steelers	1995	K League	24	1	—		7	0	—		31	1
Pohang Steelers	1996	K League	29	7	(Note: Appearance(s) in Korean FA Cup)		5	0	(Note: Appearance(s) in Asian Club Championship)		34	7
Pohang Steelers	1997	K League	0	0			6	0			6	0
Pohang Steelers	Total		110	14			27	0			137	14
Bellmare Hiratsuka	1997	J1 League	10	0	3	1	0	0	—		13	1
Bellmare Hiratsuka	1998	J1 League	32	0	2	0	0	0	—		34	0
Bellmare Hiratsuka	Total		42	0	5	1	0	0	—		47	1
Kashiwa Reysol	1999	J1 League	28	5	4	2	5	2	—		37	9
Kashiwa Reysol	2000	J1 League	29	2	2	0	2	0	—		33	2
Kashiwa Reysol	2001	J1 League	15	0	0	0	3	0	—		18	0
Kashiwa Reysol	Total		72	7	6	2	10	2	—		88	11
Pohang Steelers	2002	K League	19	0			0	0	—		19	0
LA Galaxy	2003	Major League Soccer	25	0	2	0	—		(Note: Appearance(s) in CONCACAF Champions' Cup)		27	0
LA Galaxy	2004	Major League Soccer	13	0	0	0	—		—		13	0
LA Galaxy	Total		38	0	2	0	—				40	0
Career total			281	21	13	3	37	2			331	26

=== International ===
Appearances and goals by national team and year
National team	Year	Apps	Goals
South Korea	1990	20	2
South Korea	1991	1	0
South Korea	1992	3	1
South Korea	1993	18	2
South Korea	1994	14	4
South Korea	1995	5	0
South Korea	1996	16	1
South Korea	1997	12	0
South Korea	1998	8	0
South Korea	1999	5	0
South Korea	2000	11	0
South Korea	2001	7	0
South Korea	2002	16	0
Total		136	10

Appearances and goals by competition
Competition	Apps	Goals
Friendlies	48	2
Minor competitions	26	2
CONCACAF Gold Cup	2	0
Asian Games	9	1
AFC Asian Cup qualification	3	1
AFC Asian Cup	9	0
FIFA Confederations Cup	3	0
FIFA World Cup qualification	20	2
FIFA World Cup	16	2
Total	136	10

Results list South Korea's goal tally first.

List of international goals scored by Hong Myung-bo
No.	Date	Venue	Cap	Opponent	Score	Result	Competition
1	3 August 1990	Beijing, China	10	China	1–0	1–1 (a.e.t.) (6–5 p)	1990 Dynasty Cup
2	23 September 1990	Beijing, China	13	Singapore	1–0	7–0	1990 Asian Games
3	24 August 1992	Beijing, China	23	North Korea	1–0	1–1	1992 Dynasty Cup
4	13 May 1993	Beirut, Lebanon	29	India	1–0	3–0	1994 FIFA World Cup qualification
5	19 October 1993	Doha, Qatar	39	Iraq	2–1	2–2	1994 FIFA World Cup qualification
6	5 June 1994	Boston, United States	46	Ecuador	1–1	1–2	Friendly
7	17 June 1994	Dallas, United States	48	Spain	1–2	2–2	1994 FIFA World Cup
8	27 June 1994	Dallas, United States	50	Germany	2–3	2–3	1994 FIFA World Cup
9	11 September 1994	Gangneung, South Korea	51	Ukraine	1–0	1–0	Friendly
10	8 August 1996	Ho Chi Minh City, Vietnam	69	Chinese Taipei	1–0	4–0	1996 AFC Asian Cup qualification

== Managerial statistics ==
As of 28 June 2026

Managerial record by team and tenure
Team	From	To	Record					Ref.
Team	From	To	Pld	W	D	L	Win %	Ref.
South Korea U20	19 February 2009	9 October 2009	12	8	2	2	66.67	
South Korea U23	20 October 2009	27 June 2013	32	19	8	5	59.38	
South Korea	27 June 2013	10 July 2014	19	5	4	10	26.32	
Hangzhou Greentown	17 December 2015	27 May 2017	45	15	11	19	33.33	
Ulsan HD (Note: Ulsan HD did not recognise penalty shoot-outs (at the Korea Cup and the AFC Champions League) as draws, announcing that Hong reached the 100th win in the 170th match. He finally had 102 wins, 37 draws and 36 losses according to their standard.)	24 December 2020	11 July 2024	175	99	42	34	56.57	
South Korea	8 July 2024	28 June 2026	26	15	5	6	57.69	
Total			309	161	72	76	52.10	

== Honours ==
=== Player ===
Sangmu FC

- Korean National Semipro League (Autumn): 1991

Pohang Steelers

- Asian Club Championship: 1996–97
- K League 1: 1992
- Korean FA Cup: 1996
- Korean League Cup: 1993

Kashiwa Reysol

- J.League Cup: 1999

South Korea B

- Summer Universiade: 1991

South Korea

- Asian Games bronze medal: 1990
- AFC Asian Cup third place: 2000
- Dynasty Cup: 1990

Individual

- FIFA World XI: 1997
- FIFA World Cup Bronze Ball: 2002
- FIFA World Cup All-Star Team: 2002
- FIFA World Cup Fans' All-Star Team: 2002
- FIFA 100: 2004
- AFC Asian All-Star: 1993, 1997, 2000
- AFC Asian Cup Team of the Tournament: 2000
- AFC Hall of Fame: 2014
- AFC Opta All-time XI at the FIFA World Cup: 2020
- AFC Fans' All-time XI at the FIFA World Cup: 2020
- AFC Asian Cup All-time XI: 2023
- IFFHS Asian Men's Team of the 20th Century: 2021
- IFFHS Asian Men's Team of All Time: 2021
- K League All-Star: 1992, 1995, 2002
- K League 1 Most Valuable Player: 1992
- K League 1 Best XI: 1992, 1994, 1995, 1996, 2002
- K League 30th Anniversary Best XI: 2013
- K League Hall of Fame: 2023
- J.League All-Star: 1999, 2001
- J1 League Best XI: 2000
- MLS All-Star: 2003

=== Manager ===
South Korea U23

- Summer Olympics bronze medal: 2012
- Asian Games bronze medal: 2010

Ulsan Hyundai

- K League 1: 2022, 2023

South Korea

- EAFF Championship runner-up: 2025

Individual

- K League Manager of the Month: August 2021, February/March 2022, February/March 2023
- K League 1 Manager of the Year: 2022, 2023
- K League All-Star: 2023

== See also ==
- List of men's footballers with 100 or more international caps
