= Andrei Knyazev (footballer) =

Russian footballer

Personal information
- Full name: Andrei Nikolayevich Knyazev
- Date of birth: 25 September 1974 (age 52)
- Place of birth: Magnitogorsk, Russian SFSR
- Height: 1.74 m (5 ft 8 1/2 in)
- Position: Forward

Youth career
- DYuSSh-4 Magnitogorsk

Senior career*
Years	Team	Apps	(Gls)
1992–1995	FC Metallurg Magnitogorsk	94	(29)
1995	FC KAMAZ-Chally Naberezhnye Chelny	7	(1)
1996	FC Metallurg Magnitogorsk	40	(24)
1997–1999	FC Rubin Kazan	81	(35)
1999–2000	FC Torpedo-ZIL Moscow	24	(7)
2000	FC Sokol Saratov	12	(4)
2001	FC Metallurg Lipetsk	18	(6)
2002	FC KAMAZ Naberezhnye Chelny	4	(0)
2002–2003	FC Lukoil Chelyabinsk	23	(9)
2004	FC Arsenal Tula	27	(2)
2005	FC Metallurg-Metiznik Magnitogorsk	32	(12)
- * Club domestic league appearances and goals

Andrei Nikolayevich Knyazev (Russian: Андрей Николаевич Князев; born 25 September 1974) is a former Russian professional football player.

== Career ==
Knyazev began playing football with local side FC Metallurg Magnitogorsk. In 1995, he had a brief spell playing the Russian Top League with FC KAMAZ-Chally Naberezhnye Chelny, scoring one goal in seven league matches. He also represented Russia at the 1995 Summer Universiade in Japan. Knyazev didn't feature regularly for KAMAZ, and he returned to Metallurg the following season.

In 1997, Knyazev joined FC Rubin Kazan, then playing in the Russian Second Division. He scored 25 league goals in his first season to lead the club to promotion to the Russian First Division. After his success with Rubin, Knyazev had brief spells with FC Torpedo-ZIL Moscow and FC Sokol Saratov, playing in the Russian First Division before both clubs achieved promotion at the end of the 2000 season.
