= 2002 FIFA World Cup knockout stage =

Second and final stage of the 2002 FIFA World Cup

At the 2002 FIFA World Cup, the knockout stage was the second and final stage of the tournament, following the group stage. The top two teams from each group (16 in total) advanced to the knockout stage to compete in a single-elimination tournament. A match for third place was also played between the two losing semi-finalists.

Note: Match kickoff times are given in local (South Korea and Japan) time; this is KST and JST (UTC+9) during summer time.

== Qualified teams ==
The top two placed teams from each of the eight groups qualified for the knockout stage.

| Group | Winners | Runners-up |
|---|---|---|
| A | Denmark | Senegal |
| B | Spain | Paraguay |
| C | Brazil | Turkey |
| D | South Korea | United States |
| E | Germany | Republic of Ireland |
| F | Sweden | England |
| G | Mexico | Italy |
| H | Japan | Belgium |

== Bracket ==
Round of 16
15 June – Seogwipo
Germany | 1
Paraguay | 0
17 June – Jeonju
Mexico | 0
United States | 2
16 June – Suwon
Spain (p) | 1 (3)
Republic of Ireland | 1 (2)
18 June – Daejeon
South Korea (g.g.) | 2
Italy | 1
15 June – Niigata
Denmark | 0
England | 3
17 June – Kobe
Brazil | 2
Belgium | 0
16 June – Ōita
Sweden | 1
Senegal (g.g.) | 2
18 June – Rifu
Japan | 0
Turkey | 1

Quarter-finals
21 June – Ulsan
Germany | 1
United States | 0
22 June – Gwangju
Spain | 0 (3)
South Korea (p) | 0 (5)
21 June – Fukuroi
England | 1
Brazil | 2
22 June – Osaka
Senegal | 0
Turkey (g.g.) | 1

Semi-finals
25 June – Seoul
Germany | 1
South Korea | 0
26 June – Saitama
Brazil | 1
Turkey | 0

Final
30 June – Yokohama
Germany | 0
Brazil | 2
Match for third place
29 June – Daegu
South Korea | 2
Turkey | 3

== Round of 16 ==
=== Germany vs Paraguay ===
Two minutes from the end of regulation time, Oliver Kahn sent a goal kick down the field, which was received by Torsten Frings. Frings passed to Bernd Schneider whose cross from the right was turned in by Oliver Neuville on the half volley at the near post from six yards out. In the 92nd minute, Roberto Acuña was sent off after punching Ballack.

15 June 2002
15:30

| Germany | 1–0 | Paraguay |
|---|---|---|
| Neuville 88' |

Jeju World Cup Stadium, Seogwipo
Attendance: 25,176
Referee: Carlos Alberto Batres (Guatemala)

| Germany | Paraguay |

| GK | 1 | Oliver Kahn (c) |
| CB | 3 | Marko Rehmer | | (substituted off) 46' |
| CB | 2 | Thomas Linke |
| CB | 21 | Christoph Metzelder | | (substituted off) 60' |
| RM | 19 | Bernd Schneider | (yellow card) 35' |
| CM | 22 | Torsten Frings |
| CM | 16 | Jens Jeremies |
| LM | 17 | Marco Bode |
| AM | 13 | Michael Ballack | (yellow card) 90+2' |
| CF | 7 | Oliver Neuville | | (substituted off) 90+2' |
| CF | 11 | Miroslav Klose |
Substitutions:
| MF | 15 | Sebastian Kehl | | (substituted on) 46' |
| DF | 4 | Frank Baumann | (yellow card) 71' | (substituted on) 60' |
| FW | 14 | Gerald Asamoah | | (substituted on) 90+2' |
Manager:
Rudi Völler

| GK | 1 | José Luis Chilavert (c) |
| RB | 2 | Francisco Arce |
| CB | 18 | Julio César Cáceres |
| CB | 5 | Celso Ayala |
| CB | 4 | Carlos Gamarra |
| LB | 21 | Denis Caniza |
| CM | 15 | Carlos Bonet | | (substituted off) 84' |
| CM | 10 | Roberto Acuña | (yellow card) 26' (red card) 90+2' |
| CM | 6 | Estanislao Struway | | (substituted off) 90+1' |
| CF | 20 | José Cardozo | (yellow card) 50' |
| CF | 9 | Roque Santa Cruz | | (substituted off) 29' |
Substitutions:
| FW | 11 | Jorge Campos | | (substituted on) 29' |
| MF | 14 | Diego Gavilán | | (substituted on) 84' |
| FW | 23 | Nelson Cuevas | | (substituted on) 90+1' |
Manager:
(Italy) Cesare Maldini

Man of the Match:
Jens Jeremies (Germany)

Assistant referees:
Curtis Charles (Antigua and Barbuda)
Dramane Dante (Mali)
Fourth official:
Hugh Dallas (Scotland)

=== Denmark vs England ===
After five minutes, David Beckham launched a corner towards Rio Ferdinand, whose header was fumbled by Thomas Sørensen into the net. Michael Owen doubled England's advantage after Trevor Sinclair's pass was flicked to him by Nicky Butt. England made it 3-0 one minute before half-time when a throw-in by Danny Mills was missed by Niclas Jensen, with Beckham passing to Emile Heskey who swept the ball home. In the second half, England appeared to take their foot off the pedal, possibly with a view to conserving energy for the next round: but were easily able to snuff out any rare Danish attacks, neither side coming particularly close to scoring again.

15 June 2002
20:30

| Denmark | 0–3 | England |
|---|---|---|
| | | Ferdinand 5'; Owen 22'; Heskey 44' |

Big Swan Stadium, Niigata
Attendance: 40,582
Referee: Markus Merk (Germany)

| Denmark | England |

| GK | 1 | Thomas Sørensen |
| RB | 6 | Thomas Helveg | | (substituted off) 7' |
| CB | 4 | Martin Laursen |
| CB | 3 | René Henriksen (c) |
| LB | 12 | Niclas Jensen |
| CM | 2 | Stig Tøfting | (yellow card) 24' | (substituted off) 58' |
| CM | 7 | Thomas Gravesen |
| RW | 19 | Dennis Rommedahl |
| AM | 9 | Jon Dahl Tomasson |
| LW | 8 | Jesper Grønkjær |
| CF | 11 | Ebbe Sand |
Substitutions:
| DF | 20 | Kasper Bøgelund | | (substituted on) 7' |
| MF | 14 | Claus Jensen | | (substituted on) 58' |
Manager:
Morten Olsen

| GK | 1 | David Seaman |
| RB | 2 | Danny Mills | (yellow card) 50' |
| CB | 5 | Rio Ferdinand |
| CB | 6 | Sol Campbell |
| LB | 3 | Ashley Cole |
| RM | 7 | David Beckham (c) |
| CM | 8 | Paul Scholes | | (substituted off) 49' |
| CM | 21 | Nicky Butt |
| LM | 4 | Trevor Sinclair |
| CF | 11 | Emile Heskey | | (substituted off) 69' |
| CF | 10 | Michael Owen | | (substituted off) 46' |
Substitutions:
| FW | 9 | Robbie Fowler | | (substituted on) 46' |
| MF | 23 | Kieron Dyer | | (substituted on) 49' |
| FW | 17 | Teddy Sheringham | | (substituted on) 69' |
Manager:
(Sweden) Sven-Göran Eriksson

Man of the Match:
Rio Ferdinand (England)

Assistant referees:
Heiner Müller (Germany)
Evzen Amler (Czech Republic)
Fourth official:
Mourad Daami (Tunisia)

=== Sweden vs Senegal ===
On 11 minutes, a Sweden corner was headed in by Henrik Larsson. Eight minutes before half-time, Henri Camara equalised for Senegal by shooting into the bottom-left corner. Camara scored the golden goal on 104 minutes, from a similar position shooting low in off the left post. Senegal became the second African nation to reach the quarter-finals, after Cameroon in 1990.

16 June 2002
15:30

| Sweden | 1–2 (a.e.t./g.g.) | Senegal |
|---|---|---|
| Larsson 11' | | Camara 37', 104' |

Big Eye Stadium, Ōita
Attendance: 39,747
Referee: Ubaldo Aquino (Paraguay)

| Sweden | Senegal |

| GK | 1 | Magnus Hedman |
| RB | 2 | Olof Mellberg |
| CB | 15 | Andreas Jakobsson |
| CB | 4 | Johan Mjällby (c) |
| LB | 16 | Teddy Lučić |
| RM | 7 | Niclas Alexandersson | (substituted off) 76' |
| CM | 8 | Anders Svensson |
| CM | 6 | Tobias Linderoth |
| LM | 17 | Magnus Svensson | (substituted off) 99' |
| CF | 10 | Marcus Allbäck | (substituted off) 65' |
| CF | 11 | Henrik Larsson |
Substitutions:
| FW | 22 | Andreas Andersson | (substituted on) 65' |
| FW | 21 | Zlatan Ibrahimović | (substituted on) 76' |
| MF | 18 | Mattias Jonson | (substituted on) 99' |
Managers:
Lars Lagerbäck & Tommy Söderberg

| GK | 1 | Tony Sylva |
| RB | 17 | Ferdinand Coly | (yellow card) 73' |
| CB | 13 | Lamine Diatta |
| CB | 4 | Pape Malick Diop | | (substituted off) 66' |
| LB | 2 | Omar Daf |
| CM | 19 | Papa Bouba Diop |
| CM | 6 | Aliou Cissé (c) |
| CM | 12 | Amdy Faye |
| RF | 7 | Henri Camara |
| CF | 18 | Pape Thiaw | (yellow card) 94' |
| LF | 11 | El Hadji Diouf |
Substitutions:
| DF | 21 | Habib Beye | | (substituted on) 66' |
Manager:
(France) Bruno Metsu

Man of the Match:
Henri Camara (Senegal)

Assistant referees:
Miguel Giacomuzzi (Paraguay)
Héctor Vergara (Canada)
Fourth official:
Carlos Simon (Brazil)

=== Spain vs Republic of Ireland ===
Spain took the lead in the 8th minute with a goal from Fernando Morientes, a header to the left corner of the net after a cross from the right. In the 62nd minute, Ian Harte missed a penalty after a foul on Damien Duff. Spain managed to hold out until the very last minute, when a foul by Captain Fernando Hierro on saw a penalty converted by Robbie Keane low to the left corner of the net to make it 1–1. After extra time ended goalless, Spain triumphed 3–2 on penalties with goalkeeper Iker Casillas emerging a hero by saving two attempts.

16 June 2002
20:30

| Spain | 1–1 (a.e.t.) | Republic of Ireland |
|---|---|---|
| Morientes 8' | | Rob. Keane 90' (pen.) |
Penalties
| Hierro (penalty scored); Baraja (penalty scored); Juanfran (penalty missed); Valerón (penalty missed); Mendieta (penalty scored) | 3–2 | (penalty scored) Rob. Keane; (penalty missed) Holland; (penalty missed) Connolly; (penalty missed) Kilbane; (penalty scored) Finnan |

Suwon World Cup Stadium, Suwon
Attendance: 38,926
Referee: Anders Frisk (Sweden)

| Spain | Republic of Ireland |

| GK | 1 | Iker Casillas |
| RB | 5 | Carles Puyol |
| CB | 6 | Fernando Hierro (c) | (yellow card) 89' |
| CB | 4 | Iván Helguera |
| LB | 3 | Juanfran | (yellow card) 62' |
| RM | 21 | Luis Enrique |
| CM | 8 | Rubén Baraja | (yellow card) 87' |
| CM | 17 | Juan Carlos Valerón |
| LM | 11 | Javier de Pedro | | (substituted off) 66' |
| CF | 7 | Raúl | | (substituted off) 80' |
| CF | 9 | Fernando Morientes | | (substituted off) 72' |
Substitutions:
| MF | 16 | Gaizka Mendieta | | (substituted on) 66' |
| MF | 14 | David Albelda | | (substituted on) 72' |
| FW | 12 | Albert Luque | | (substituted on) 80' |
Manager:
José Antonio Camacho

| GK | 1 | Shay Given |
| RB | 2 | Steve Finnan |
| CB | 14 | Gary Breen |
| CB | 5 | Steve Staunton (c) | (substituted off) 50' |
| LB | 3 | Ian Harte | (substituted off) 82' |
| RM | 18 | Gary Kelly | (substituted off) 55' |
| CM | 12 | Mark Kinsella |
| CM | 8 | Matt Holland |
| LM | 11 | Kevin Kilbane |
| CF | 9 | Damien Duff |
| CF | 10 | Robbie Keane |
Substitutions:
| DF | 4 | Kenny Cunningham | (substituted on) 50' |
| FW | 17 | Niall Quinn | (substituted on) 55' |
| FW | 13 | David Connolly | (substituted on) 82' |
Manager:
Mick McCarthy

Man of the Match:
Iker Casillas (Spain)

Assistant referees:
Leif Lindberg (Sweden)
Igor Šramka (Slovakia)
Fourth official:
Urs Meier (Switzerland)

=== Mexico vs United States ===
After eight minutes, Claudio Reyna managed to run through the right-hand side before sending the ball to Josh Wolff, who then switched the ball over to Brian McBride who struck the ball into the net. Landon Donovan doubled the United States' advantage midway through the second half after Eddie Lewis ran through the left-hand side before sending the ball towards Donovan who headed the ball home. A frustrated Mexico also saw captain Rafael Márquez sent off late on by referee Vítor Melo Pereira for a dangerous tackle on Cobi Jones.

17 June 2002
15:30

| Mexico | 0–2 | United States |
|---|---|---|
| | | McBride 8'; Donovan 65' |

Jeonju World Cup Stadium, Jeonju
Attendance: 36,380
Referee: Vítor Melo Pereira (Portugal)

| Mexico | United States |

| GK | 1 | Óscar Pérez |
| RB | 16 | Salvador Carmona | (yellow card) 84' |
| CB | 4 | Rafael Márquez (c) | (red card) 88' |
| CB | 5 | Manuel Vidrio | (yellow card) 37' | (substituted off) 46' |
| LB | 11 | Braulio Luna |
| RM | 21 | Jesús Arellano |
| CM | 6 | Gerardo Torrado | | (substituted off) 78' |
| CM | 18 | Johan Rodríguez |
| LM | 7 | Ramón Morales | | (substituted off) 28' |
| SS | 10 | Cuauhtémoc Blanco | (yellow card) 70' |
| CF | 9 | Jared Borgetti |
Substitutions:
| FW | 15 | Luis Hernández | (yellow card) 67' | (substituted on) 28' |
| CM | 13 | Sigifredo Mercado | | (substituted on) 46' |
| CM | 8 | Alberto García Aspe | (yellow card) 81' | (substituted on) 78' |
Manager:
Javier Aguirre

| GK | 1 | Brad Friedel | (yellow card) 83' |
| CB | 22 | Tony Sanneh |
| CB | 23 | Eddie Pope | (yellow card) 26' |
| CB | 3 | Gregg Berhalter | (yellow card) 53' |
| RM | 10 | Claudio Reyna (c) |
| CM | 4 | Pablo Mastroeni | (yellow card) 47' | (substituted off) 90' |
| CM | 21 | Landon Donovan |
| CM | 5 | John O'Brien |
| LM | 7 | Eddie Lewis |
| CF | 15 | Josh Wolff | (yellow card) 50' | (substituted off) 59' |
| CF | 20 | Brian McBride | | (substituted off) 79' |
Substitutions:
| MF | 8 | Earnie Stewart | | (substituted on) 59' |
| MF | 13 | Cobi Jones | | (substituted on) 79' |
| DF | 16 | Carlos Llamosa | | (substituted on) 90' |
Manager:
Bruce Arena

Man of the Match:
Landon Donovan (United States)

Assistant referees:
Carlos Matos (Portugal)
Egon Bereuter (Austria)
Fourth official:
Jan Wegereef (Netherlands)

=== Brazil vs Belgium ===
The match saw fight and resilience from both sides. Belgium had a first half goal from Marc Wilmots ruled out after he was adjudged to have pushed Roque Júnior by referee Peter Prendergast. Goalkeepers Marcos and Geert De Vlieger were both forced into making multiple saves to contain each side from taking the lead. Despite Belgium's best efforts, Brazil took the lead on 67 minutes after Ronaldinho managed to find Rivaldo on the edge of the Belgian penalty area who controlled the ball before firing an effort, which deflected off of defender Daniel Van Buyten, into the net. Belgium continued their persistent efforts in finding a goal, but ultimately fell short and Ronaldo sealed the win for Brazil in the 87th minute after Kléberson found him unmarked in the centre, and the Brazilian striker was left to finish from 12 yards.

17 June 2002
20:30

| Brazil | 2–0 | Belgium |
|---|---|---|
| Rivaldo 67'; Ronaldo 87' |

Kobe Wing Stadium, Kobe
Attendance: 40,440
Referee: Peter Prendergast (Jamaica)

| Brazil | Belgium |

| GK | 1 | Marcos |
| CB | 3 | Lúcio |
| CB | 4 | Roque Júnior |
| CB | 5 | Edmílson |
| RWB | 2 | Cafu (c) |
| LWB | 6 | Roberto Carlos | (yellow card) 28' |
| CM | 19 | Juninho Paulista | | (substituted off) 57' |
| CM | 8 | Gilberto Silva |
| AM | 11 | Ronaldinho | | (substituted off) 81' |
| SS | 10 | Rivaldo | | (substituted off) 90' |
| CF | 9 | Ronaldo |
Substitutions:
| MF | 17 | Denílson | | (substituted on) 57' |
| MF | 15 | Kléberson | | (substituted on) 81' |
| MF | 7 | Ricardinho | | (substituted on) 90' |
Manager:
Luiz Felipe Scolari

| GK | 1 | Geert De Vlieger |
| RB | 15 | Jacky Peeters | | (substituted off) 72' |
| CB | 16 | Daniel Van Buyten |
| CB | 6 | Timmy Simons |
| LB | 5 | Nico Van Kerckhoven |
| RM | 22 | Mbo Mpenza |
| CM | 18 | Yves Vanderhaeghe | (yellow card) 24' |
| CM | 10 | Johan Walem |
| LM | 8 | Bart Goor |
| CF | 11 | Gert Verheyen |
| CF | 7 | Marc Wilmots (c) |
Substitutions:
| FW | 9 | Wesley Sonck | | (substituted on) 72' |
Manager:
Robert Waseige

Man of the Match:
Rivaldo (Brazil)

Assistant referees:
Yury Dupanov (Belarus)
Mohamed Saeed (Maldives)
Fourth official:
Toru Kamikawa (Japan)

=== Japan vs Turkey ===
In the 12th minute, Ergün Penbe sent in a corner for Turkey where Ümit Davala managed to head the ball beyond goalkeeper Seigo Narazaki in what would be the only goal of the match.

18 June 2002
15:30

| Japan | 0–1 | Turkey |
|---|---|---|
| | | Davala 12' |

Miyagi Stadium, Rifu
Attendance: 45,666
Referee: Pierluigi Collina (Italy)

| Japan | Turkey |

| GK | 12 | Seigo Narazaki |
| CB | 3 | Naoki Matsuda |
| CB | 17 | Tsuneyasu Miyamoto (c) |
| CB | 16 | Kōji Nakata |
| RM | 20 | Tomokazu Myojin |
| CM | 21 | Kazuyuki Toda | (yellow card) 45' |
| CM | 7 | Hidetoshi Nakata |
| CM | 5 | Junichi Inamoto | | (substituted off) 46' |
| LM | 18 | Shinji Ono |
| CF | 9 | Akinori Nishizawa |
| CF | 14 | Alex | | (substituted off) 46' |
Substitutions:
| FW | 11 | Takayuki Suzuki | | (substituted on) 46' |
| MF | 22 | Daisuke Ichikawa | | (substituted on) 46' | (substituted off) 86' |
| MF | 8 | Hiroaki Morishima | | | (substituted on) 86' |
Manager:
(France) Philippe Troussier

| GK | 1 | Rüştü Reçber |
| RB | 5 | Alpay Özalan | (yellow card) 21' |
| CB | 3 | Bülent Korkmaz |
| LB | 20 | Hakan Ünsal |
| CM | 4 | Fatih Akyel |
| CM | 8 | Tugay Kerimoğlu |
| CM | 18 | Ergün Penbe | (yellow card) 44' |
| RW | 22 | Ümit Davala | | (substituted off) 74' |
| AM | 10 | Yıldıray Baştürk | | (substituted off) 90' |
| LW | 11 | Hasan Şaş | | (substituted off) 85' |
| CF | 9 | Hakan Şükür (c) | (yellow card) 90' |
Substitutions:
| MF | 15 | Nihat Kahveci | | (substituted on) 74' |
| FW | 14 | Tayfur Havutçu | | (substituted on) 85' |
| FW | 17 | İlhan Mansız | | (substituted on) 90' |
Manager:
Şenol Güneş

Man of the Match:
Alpay Özalan (Turkey)

Assistant referees:
Maciej Wierzbowski (Poland)
Paul Smith (New Zealand)
Fourth official:
Graham Poll (England)

=== South Korea vs Italy ===
The 2002 FIFA World Cup round of 16 match between Italy and co-hosts South Korea was played on 18 June in Daejon. In the first round, South Korea had topped their group with victories over Poland and Portugal, and a draw against the United States, while Italy struggled to advance to the second round with a victory against Ecuador, a defeat against Croatia, and a draw against Mexico, while also having several goals ruled out for offside. In the lead-up to the match, the press saw the in-form South Koreans as the favourites to win, in particular as Italy's usual starting defensive pair, Alessandro Nesta and Fabio Cannavaro, were both unavailable – the first due to injury and the latter due to suspension. The pre-game choreography by the Korean fans also saw supporters hold up red and white cards spelling out the words "Again 1966", a reference to Italy's elimination at the hands of North Korea in the first round of the 1966 World Cup.

In the fifth minute of play, Ecuadorian referee Byron Moreno awarded a controversial penalty for South Korea after judging Christian Panucci to have pulled down Seol Ki-hyeon in the box, but Italian goalkeeper Gianluigi Buffon saved Ahn Jung-hwan's spot kick, putting the ball out for a corner. Italy took the lead in the 19th minute after Christian Vieri headed in a Francesco Totti corner. The second half became increasingly physical, which saw several players on both teams sustain minor injuries, including Christian Vieri breaking the nose of Kim Tae-young who continued on famously in subsequent matches with a protective face mask. Gianluca Zambrotta and Kim Nam-il were later forced off. Seol Ki-hyeon eventually managed to equalise in the 89th minute to send the match into extra-time. In the first half of extra-time, Italy were reduced to ten men after Moreno showed Totti a second yellow card for an alleged dive in South Korea's penalty area, while Moreno was 30 yards away from the play, and in the second half, Damiano Tommasi appeared to score a golden goal for Italy, but it was ruled out for offside; Ahn later scored the golden goal in the 118th minute to give the co-hosts a 2–1 victory, which allowed them to progress to the quarter-finals of the competition, the first time an Asian team had done so since their North Korean counterparts in 1966.

Following Italy's elimination from the tournament, Moreno's performance was criticised by members of the Italian team – most notably attacking midfielder Totti and coach Giovanni Trapattoni – for several contentious decisions he had made throughout the match. Some team members even suggested a conspiracy to eliminate Italy from the competition, while Trapattoni even obliquely accused FIFA of ordering the official to ensure a Korean victory so that one of the two host nations would remain in the tournament. FIFA President Sepp Blatter stated that the linesmen had been a "disaster" and admitted that Italy suffered from bad offside calls from the group matches, but he denied conspiracy allegations. While he criticised Totti's sending off by Moreno, Blatter refused to blame Italy's loss on the officials, stating: "Italy's elimination is not only down to referees and linesmen who made human not premeditated errors ... Italy made mistakes both in defense and in attack." The following day, Perugia's owner Luciano Gaucci controversially terminated Ahn's contract, citing the goal against Italy as the reason. This decision was widely condemned as discriminatory in the media, and Gaucci later retracted his decision, but Ahn rejected the club's offer and ultimately left Perugia.

18 June 2002
20:30

| South Korea | 2–1 (a.e.t./g.g.) | Italy |
|---|---|---|
| Seol Ki-hyeon 88'; Ahn Jung-hwan 117' | | Vieri 18' |

Daejeon World Cup Stadium, Daejeon
Attendance: 38,588
Referee: Byron Moreno (Ecuador)

| South Korea | Italy |

| GK | 1 | Lee Woon-jae |
| CB | 4 | Choi Jin-cheul | (yellow card) 115' |
| CB | 20 | Hong Myung-bo (c) | | (substituted off) 83' |
| CB | 7 | Kim Tae-young | (yellow card) 17' | (substituted off) 63' |
| RM | 22 | Song Chong-gug | (yellow card) 80' |
| CM | 6 | Yoo Sang-chul |
| CM | 5 | Kim Nam-il | | (substituted off) 68' |
| LM | 10 | Lee Young-pyo |
| RF | 21 | Park Ji-sung |
| CF | 19 | Ahn Jung-hwan |
| LF | 9 | Seol Ki-hyeon |
Substitutions:
| FW | 18 | Hwang Sun-hong | | (substituted on) 63' |
| FW | 14 | Lee Chun-soo | (yellow card) 99' | (substituted on) 68' |
| FW | 16 | Cha Du-ri | | (substituted on) 83' |
Manager:
(Netherlands) Guus Hiddink

| GK | 1 | Gianluigi Buffon |
| RB | 2 | Christian Panucci |
| CB | 15 | Mark Iuliano |
| CB | 3 | Paolo Maldini (c) |
| LB | 4 | Francesco Coco | (yellow card) 4' |
| RM | 17 | Damiano Tommasi | (yellow card) 55' |
| CM | 6 | Cristiano Zanetti | (yellow card) 59' |
| LM | 19 | Gianluca Zambrotta | | (substituted off) 72' |
| AM | 7 | Alessandro Del Piero | | (substituted off) 61' |
| AM | 10 | Francesco Totti | (yellow card) 22' (yellow-red card) 103' |
| CF | 21 | Christian Vieri |
Substitutions:
| MF | 8 | Gennaro Gattuso | | (substituted on) 61' |
| MF | 16 | Angelo Di Livio | | (substituted on) 72' |
Manager:
Giovanni Trapattoni

Man of the Match:
Ahn Jung-hwan (South Korea)

Assistant referees:
Jorge Rattalino (Argentina)
Ferenc Szekely (Hungary)
Fourth official:
Mohamed Guezzaz (Morocco)

== Quarter-finals ==
=== England vs Brazil ===
21 June 2002
15:30

| England | 1–2 | Brazil |
|---|---|---|
| Owen 23' | | Rivaldo 45+2'; Ronaldinho 50' |

Stadium Ecopa, Fukuroi
Attendance: 47,436
Referee: Felipe Ramos (Mexico)

| England | Brazil |

| GK | 1 | David Seaman |
| RB | 2 | Danny Mills |
| CB | 5 | Rio Ferdinand | (yellow card) 86' |
| CB | 6 | Sol Campbell |
| LB | 3 | Ashley Cole | | (substituted off) 80' |
| RM | 7 | David Beckham (c) |
| CM | 21 | Nicky Butt |
| CM | 8 | Paul Scholes | (yellow card) 75' |
| LM | 4 | Trevor Sinclair | | (substituted off) 56' |
| CF | 10 | Michael Owen | | (substituted off) 79' |
| CF | 11 | Emile Heskey |
Substitutions:
| MF | 23 | Kieron Dyer | | (substituted on) 56' |
| FW | 20 | Darius Vassell | | (substituted on) 79' |
| FW | 17 | Teddy Sheringham | | (substituted on) 80' |
Manager:
(Sweden) Sven-Göran Eriksson

| GK | 1 | Marcos |
| CB | 3 | Lúcio |
| CB | 5 | Edmílson |
| CB | 4 | Roque Júnior |
| RWB | 2 | Cafu (c) |
| LWB | 6 | Roberto Carlos |
| CM | 15 | Kléberson |
| CM | 8 | Gilberto Silva |
| AM | 11 | Ronaldinho | (red card) 57' |
| SS | 10 | Rivaldo |
| CF | 9 | Ronaldo | | (substituted off) 70' |
Substitutions:
| FW | 20 | Edílson | | (substituted on) 70' |
Manager:
Luiz Felipe Scolari

Man of the Match:
Rivaldo (Brazil)

Assistant referees:
Héctor Vergara (Canada)
Mohamed Saeed (Maldives)
Fourth official:
Ali Bujsaim (United Arab Emirates)

=== Germany vs United States ===
21 June 2002
20:30

| Germany | 1–0 | United States |
|---|---|---|
| Ballack 39' |

Munsu Cup Stadium, Ulsan
Attendance: 37,337
Referee: Hugh Dallas (Scotland)

| Germany | United States |

| GK | 1 | Oliver Kahn (c) |
| CB | 2 | Thomas Linke |
| CB | 15 | Sebastian Kehl | (yellow card) 66' |
| CB | 21 | Christoph Metzelder |
| RM | 22 | Torsten Frings |
| CM | 19 | Bernd Schneider | | (substituted off) 60' |
| CM | 8 | Dietmar Hamann |
| LM | 6 | Christian Ziege |
| AM | 13 | Michael Ballack |
| CF | 7 | Oliver Neuville | | (substituted off) 80' |
| CF | 11 | Miroslav Klose | | (substituted off) 88' |
Substitutions:
| MF | 16 | Jens Jeremies | (yellow card) 68' | (substituted on) 60' |
| MF | 17 | Marco Bode | | (substituted on) 80' |
| FW | 20 | Oliver Bierhoff | | (substituted on) 88' |
Manager:
Rudi Völler

| GK | 1 | Brad Friedel |
| CB | 22 | Tony Sanneh |
| CB | 23 | Eddie Pope | (yellow card) 41' |
| CB | 3 | Gregg Berhalter | (yellow card) 70' |
| DM | 4 | Pablo Mastroeni | (yellow card) 69' | (substituted off) 80' |
| RM | 2 | Frankie Hejduk | | (substituted off) 65' |
| CM | 10 | Claudio Reyna (c) | (yellow card) 68' |
| CM | 5 | John O'Brien |
| LM | 7 | Eddie Lewis | (yellow card) 40' |
| CF | 20 | Brian McBride | | (substituted off) 58' |
| CF | 21 | Landon Donovan |
Substitutions:
| FW | 11 | Clint Mathis | | (substituted on) 58' |
| MF | 13 | Cobi Jones | | (substituted on) 65' |
| MF | 8 | Earnie Stewart | | (substituted on) 80' |
Manager:
Bruce Arena

Man of the Match:
Claudio Reyna (United States)

Assistant referees:
Philip Sharp (England)
Ali Al Traifi (Saudi Arabia)
Fourth official:
Mark Shield (Australia)

=== Spain vs South Korea ===
Co-hosts South Korea faced Spain in the 2002 World Cup quarter-finals on 22 June, in Gwangju. South Korea had progressed to the quarter-finals after defeating Italy with a golden goal, while Spain overcame Ireland in the round of 16 in a penalty shoot-out victory. In the second half of regulation time, Spanish midfielder Rubén Baraja scored from a header, but it was disallowed by referee Gamal Al-Ghandour because of alleged shirt pulling and pushing in the penalty area; a 0–0 deadlock saw the match go into extra-time. In the first half of extra-time, Spanish striker Fernando Morientes appeared to score the golden goal with a header, but the referee disallowed it after the linesman raised his flag, as he erroneously felt that the ball had gone out of play for a goal kick before being crossed in by winger Joaquín; later on in the half, Morientes came close to scoring again when he hit the post with a first-time half-volley following a throw-in. With both sides still failing to score, the match went to a penalty shoot-out; South Korea's goalkeeper Lee Woon-jae saved Joaquín's spot kick – who had been carrying an injury – while South Korea converted all of their penalties – with Hong Myung-bo scoring the decisive spot-kick – to win the shoot-out 5–3, becoming the first Asian side ever to reach the semi-finals of the World Cup. However, following prior criticism in the media over the quality of officiating in South Korea's win over Italy in the round of 16, there was further controversy surrounding the contentious decisions made by the officials in South Korea's quarter-final victory, as the referee had disallowed both of Spain's goals after his linesmen Ali Tomusange and Michael Ragoonath had raised their flags. Spanish midfielder Iván Helguera, who had to be restrained after the match when he attempted to confront the referee, was particularly vocal in his criticism of the officials' decisions, stating afterwards: "What happened here was robbery. Everyone saw two perfectly good goals. If Spain didn't win, it's because they didn't want us to win. I feel terrible about this game."

22 June 2002
15:30

| Spain | 0–0 (a.e.t.) | South Korea |
Penalties
| Hierro (penalty scored); Baraja (penalty scored); Xavi (penalty scored); Joaquín (penalty missed) | 3–5 | (penalty scored) Hwang Sun-hong; (penalty scored) Park Ji-sung; (penalty scored) Seol Ki-hyeon; (penalty scored) Ahn Jung-hwan; (penalty scored) Hong Myung-bo |

Gwangju World Cup Stadium, Gwangju
Attendance: 42,114
Referee: Gamal Al-Ghandour (Egypt)

| Spain | South Korea |

| GK | 1 | Iker Casillas |
| RB | 5 | Carles Puyol |
| CB | 6 | Fernando Hierro (c) |
| CB | 20 | Miguel Ángel Nadal |
| LB | 15 | Enrique Romero |
| RM | 22 | Joaquín |
| DM | 4 | Iván Helguera | | (substituted off) 93' |
| CM | 17 | Juan Carlos Valerón | | (substituted off) 80' |
| CM | 8 | Rubén Baraja |
| LM | 11 | Javier de Pedro | (yellow card) 53' | (substituted off) 70' |
| CF | 9 | Fernando Morientes | (yellow card) 111' |
Substitutions:
| MF | 16 | Gaizka Mendieta | | (substituted on) 70' |
| MF | 21 | Luis Enrique | | (substituted on) 80' |
| MF | 19 | Xavi | | (substituted on) 93' |
Manager:
José Antonio Camacho

| GK | 1 | Lee Woon-jae |
| CB | 4 | Choi Jin-cheul |
| CB | 20 | Hong Myung-bo (c) |
| CB | 7 | Kim Tae-young | | (substituted off) 90' |
| RM | 22 | Song Chong-gug |
| CM | 5 | Kim Nam-il | | (substituted off) 32' |
| CM | 6 | Yoo Sang-chul | (yellow card) 52' | (substituted off) 60' |
| LM | 10 | Lee Young-pyo |
| RF | 21 | Park Ji-sung |
| CF | 19 | Ahn Jung-hwan |
| LF | 9 | Seol Ki-hyeon |
Substitutions:
| MF | 13 | Lee Eul-yong | | (substituted on) 32' |
| FW | 14 | Lee Chun-soo | | (substituted on) 60' |
| FW | 18 | Hwang Sun-hong | | (substituted on) 90' |
Manager:
(Netherlands) Guus Hiddink

Man of the Match:
Lee Woon-jae (South Korea)

Assistant referees:
Ali Tomusange (Uganda)
Michael Ragoonath (Trinidad and Tobago)
Fourth official:
Saad Mane (Kuwait)

=== Senegal vs Turkey ===
22 June 2002
20:30

| Senegal | 0–1 (a.e.t./g.g.) | Turkey |
|---|---|---|
| | | Mansız 94' |

Nagai Stadium, Osaka
Attendance: 44,233
Referee: Óscar Ruiz (Colombia)

| Senegal | Turkey |

| GK | 1 | Tony Sylva |
| RB | 17 | Ferdinand Coly |
| CB | 13 | Lamine Diatta |
| CB | 4 | Pape Malick Diop |
| LB | 2 | Omar Daf | (yellow card) 12' |
| CM | 19 | Papa Bouba Diop |
| CM | 6 | Aliou Cissé (c) | (yellow card) 63' |
| CM | 15 | Salif Diao |
| RF | 7 | Henri Camara |
| CF | 11 | El Hadji Diouf |
| LF | 10 | Khalilou Fadiga |
Manager:
(France) Bruno Metsu

| GK | 1 | Rüştü Reçber |
| RB | 4 | Fatih Akyel |
| CB | 5 | Alpay Özalan |
| CB | 3 | Bülent Korkmaz |
| LB | 18 | Ergün Penbe |
| RM | 22 | Ümit Davala |
| CM | 8 | Tugay Kerimoğlu |
| LM | 21 | Emre Belözoğlu | (yellow card) 22' | (substituted off) 91' |
| AM | 10 | Yıldıray Baştürk |
| AM | 11 | Hasan Şaş |
| CF | 9 | Hakan Şükür (c) | | (substituted off) 67' |
Substitutions:
| FW | 17 | İlhan Mansız | (yellow card) 87' | (substituted on) 67' |
| FW | 6 | Arif Erdem | | (substituted on) 91' |
Manager:
Şenol Güneş

Man of the Match:
Hasan Şaş (Turkey)

Assistant referees:
Jorge Rattalino (Argentina)
Miguel Giacomuzzi (Paraguay)
Fourth official:
Gilles Veissière (France)

== Semi-finals ==
=== Germany vs South Korea ===
25 June 2002
20:30

| Germany | 1–0 | South Korea |
|---|---|---|
| Ballack 75' |

Seoul World Cup Stadium, Seoul
Attendance: 65,256
Referee: Urs Meier (Switzerland)

| Germany | South Korea |

| GK | 1 | Oliver Kahn (c) |
| CB | 2 | Thomas Linke |
| CB | 5 | Carsten Ramelow |
| CB | 21 | Christoph Metzelder |
| RWB | 22 | Torsten Frings |
| LWB | 17 | Marco Bode |
| CM | 19 | Bernd Schneider | | (substituted off) 85' |
| CM | 8 | Dietmar Hamann |
| AM | 13 | Michael Ballack | (yellow card) 71' |
| CF | 11 | Miroslav Klose | | (substituted off) 70' |
| CF | 7 | Oliver Neuville | (yellow card) 85' | (substituted off) 88' |
Substitutions:
| FW | 20 | Oliver Bierhoff | | (substituted on) 70' |
| MF | 16 | Jens Jeremies | | (substituted on) 85' |
| FW | 14 | Gerald Asamoah | | (substituted on) 88' |
Manager:
Rudi Völler

| GK | 1 | Lee Woon-jae |
| CB | 4 | Choi Jin-cheul | | (substituted off) 56' |
| CB | 20 | Hong Myung-bo (c) | | (substituted off) 80' |
| CB | 7 | Kim Tae-young |
| RM | 22 | Song Chong-gug |
| CM | 6 | Yoo Sang-chul |
| CM | 21 | Park Ji-sung |
| LM | 10 | Lee Young-pyo |
| RF | 16 | Cha Du-ri |
| CF | 18 | Hwang Sun-hong | | (substituted off) 54' |
| LF | 14 | Lee Chun-soo |
Substitutions:
| FW | 19 | Ahn Jung-hwan | | (substituted on) 54' |
| DF | 15 | Lee Min-sung | (yellow card) 90' | (substituted on) 56' |
| FW | 9 | Seol Ki-hyeon | | (substituted on) 80' |
Manager:
(Netherlands) Guus Hiddink

Man of the Match:
Michael Ballack (Germany)

Assistant referees:
Frédéric Arnault (France)
Evzen Amler (Czech Republic)
Fourth official:
Gilles Veissière (France)

=== Brazil vs Turkey ===
26 June 2002
20:30

| Brazil | 1–0 | Turkey |
|---|---|---|
| Ronaldo 49' |

Saitama Stadium, Saitama
Attendance: 61,058
Referee: Kim Milton Nielsen (Denmark)

| Brazil | Turkey |

| GK | 1 | Marcos |
| CB | 3 | Lúcio |
| CB | 4 | Roque Júnior |
| CB | 5 | Edmílson |
| RM | 2 | Cafu (c) |
| CM | 15 | Kléberson | | (substituted off) 85' |
| CM | 8 | Gilberto Silva | (yellow card) 41' |
| LM | 6 | Roberto Carlos |
| RF | 20 | Edílson | | (substituted off) 75' |
| CF | 9 | Ronaldo | | (substituted off) 68' |
| LF | 10 | Rivaldo |
Substitutions:
| FW | 21 | Luizão | | (substituted on) 68' |
| MF | 17 | Denílson | | (substituted on) 75' |
| DF | 13 | Belletti | | (substituted on) 85' |
Manager:
Luiz Felipe Scolari

| GK | 1 | Rüştü Reçber |
| RB | 4 | Fatih Akyel |
| CB | 5 | Alpay Özalan |
| CB | 3 | Bülent Korkmaz |
| LB | 18 | Ergün Penbe |
| DM | 8 | Tugay Kerimoğlu | (yellow card) 59' |
| RM | 22 | Ümit Davala | | (substituted off) 74' |
| CM | 10 | Yıldıray Baştürk | | (substituted off) 88' |
| LM | 21 | Emre Belözoğlu | | (substituted off) 62' |
| CF | 11 | Hasan Şaş | (yellow card) 90' |
| CF | 9 | Hakan Şükür (c) |
Substitutions:
| FW | 17 | İlhan Mansız | | (substituted on) 62' |
| MF | 13 | Muzzy Izzet | | (substituted on) 74' |
| FW | 6 | Arif Erdem | | (substituted on) 88' |
Manager:
Şenol Güneş

Man of the Match:
Ronaldo (Brazil)

Assistant referees:
Maciej Wierzbowski (Poland)
Igor Šramka (Slovakia)
Fourth official:
Brian Hall (United States)

== Match for third place ==
29 June 2002
20:00

| South Korea | 2–3 | Turkey |
|---|---|---|
| Lee Eul-yong 9'; Song Chong-gug 90+3' | | Şükür 1'; Mansız 13', 32' |

Daegu World Cup Stadium, Daegu
Attendance: 63,483
Referee: Saad Mane (Kuwait)

| South Korea | Turkey |

| GK | 1 | Lee Woon-jae |
| CB | 6 | Yoo Sang-chul |
| CB | 20 | Hong Myung-bo (c) | | (substituted off) 46' |
| CB | 15 | Lee Min-sung |
| RM | 22 | Song Chong-gug |
| CM | 21 | Park Ji-sung |
| CM | 10 | Lee Young-pyo |
| LM | 13 | Lee Eul-yong | (yellow card) 23' | (substituted off) 65' |
| RF | 9 | Seol Ki-hyeon | | (substituted off) 79' |
| CF | 19 | Ahn Jung-hwan |
| LF | 14 | Lee Chun-soo |
Substitutions:
| DF | 7 | Kim Tae-young | | (substituted on) 46' |
| FW | 16 | Cha Du-ri | | (substituted on) 65' |
| MF | 8 | Choi Tae-uk | | (substituted on) 79' |
Manager:
(Netherlands) Guus Hiddink

| GK | 1 | Rüştü Reçber | (yellow card) 83' |
| RB | 4 | Fatih Akyel |
| CB | 5 | Alpay Özalan |
| CB | 3 | Bülent Korkmaz |
| LB | 18 | Ergün Penbe |
| RM | 22 | Ümit Davala | | (substituted off) 76' |
| CM | 8 | Tugay Kerimoğlu | (yellow card) 50' |
| CM | 10 | Yıldıray Baştürk | | (substituted off) 86' |
| LM | 21 | Emre Belözoğlu | | (substituted off) 41' |
| CF | 9 | Hakan Şükür (c) |
| CF | 17 | İlhan Mansız |
Substitutions:
| MF | 20 | Hakan Ünsal | | (substituted on) 41' |
| MF | 7 | Okan Buruk | | (substituted on) 76' |
| MF | 14 | Tayfur Havutçu | | (substituted on) 86' |
Manager:
Şenol Güneş

Man of the Match:
Hakan Şükür (Turkey)

Assistant referees:
Ali Al Traifi (Saudi Arabia)
Héctor Vergara (Canada)
Fourth official:
Felipe Ramos (Mexico)

== Final ==
30 June 2002
20:00

| Germany | 0–2 | Brazil |
|---|---|---|
| | | Ronaldo 67', 79' |

International Stadium, Yokohama
Attendance: 69,029
Referee: Pierluigi Collina (Italy)

| Germany | Brazil |

| GK | 1 | Oliver Kahn (c) |
| CB | 2 | Thomas Linke |
| CB | 5 | Carsten Ramelow |
| CB | 21 | Christoph Metzelder |
| RM | 22 | Torsten Frings |
| CM | 8 | Dietmar Hamann |
| CM | 16 | Jens Jeremies | | (substituted off) 77' |
| LM | 17 | Marco Bode | | (substituted off) 84' |
| AM | 19 | Bernd Schneider |
| CF | 11 | Miroslav Klose | (yellow card) 9' | (substituted off) 74' |
| CF | 7 | Oliver Neuville |
Substitutions:
| FW | 20 | Oliver Bierhoff | | (substituted on) 74' |
| FW | 14 | Gerald Asamoah | | (substituted on) 77' |
| MF | 6 | Christian Ziege | | (substituted on) 84' |
Manager:
Rudi Völler

| GK | 1 | Marcos |
| CB | 3 | Lúcio |
| CB | 5 | Edmílson |
| CB | 4 | Roque Júnior | (yellow card) 6' |
| RWB | 2 | Cafu (c) |
| LWB | 6 | Roberto Carlos |
| CM | 8 | Gilberto Silva |
| CM | 15 | Kléberson |
| AM | 11 | Ronaldinho | | (substituted off) 85' |
| CF | 10 | Rivaldo |
| CF | 9 | Ronaldo | | (substituted off) 90' |
Substitutions:
| MF | 19 | Juninho Paulista | | (substituted on) 85' |
| MF | 17 | Denílson | | (substituted on) 90' |
Manager:
Luiz Felipe Scolari

Man of the Match:
Ronaldo (Brazil)

Assistant referees:
Leif Lindberg (Sweden)
Philip Sharp (England)
Fourth official:
Hugh Dallas (Scotland)
