= Football at the 1997 East Asian Games =

Football at the 1997 East Asian Games was the second edition of the football tournament at East Asian Games. All matches were played in Busan, South Korea during May 1997.

== Final table ==
Team	Pld	W	D	L	GF	GA	GD	Pts
South Korea	5	4	0	1	28	2	+26	12
Japan	5	3	1	1	20	4	+16	10
China	5	3	1	1	15	7	+8	10
Kazakhstan	5	2	2	1	34	9	+25	8
Mongolia	5	1	0	4	7	26	−19	3
Guam	5	0	0	5	1	57	−56	0

== Results ==
Matchday 1

1997-05-11

Mongolia	0 – 6	China

Busan, South Korea

1997-05-11

South Korea B	3 – 1	Kazakhstan

Busan, South Korea

1997-05-11

Guam	0 – 12	Japan

Busan, South Korea

Matchday 2

1997-05-13

Kazakhstan	20 – 1	Guam

Busan, South Korea

1997-05-13

South Korea B	7 – 0	China

Busan, South Korea

1997-05-13

Japan	5 – 0	Mongolia

Busan, South Korea

Matchday 3

1997-05-15

Guam	0 – 7	China

Busan, South Korea

1997-05-15

South Korea B	4 – 0	Mongolia

Busan, South Korea

1997-05-15

Kazakhstan	2 – 2	Japan

Busan, South Korea

Matchday 4

1997-05-17

Mongolia	3 – 11	Kazakhstan

Busan, South Korea

1997-05-17

China	2 – 0	Japan

Busan, South Korea

1997-05-17

South Korea B	14 – 0	Guam

Busan, South Korea

Matchday 5

1997-05-19

Guam	0 – 4	Mongolia

Busan, South Korea

1997-05-19

China	0 – 0	Kazakhstan

Busan, South Korea

1997-05-19

South Korea B	0 – 1	Japan

Busan, South Korea

== Medalists ==
Event	Gold	Silver	Bronze
Football	South Korea	Japan	China
