= Cheongchun FC Hungry Eleven =

2015 South Korean television series

- Genre: Sports-variety
- Country of origin: South Korea
- Original language: Korean
- No. of episodes: 16

Production
- Running time: 75 minutes

Original release
- Network: KBS2
- Release: July 11 – October 24, 2015

Cheongchun FC Hungry Eleven (Korean: 청춘FC 헝그리 일레븐) is a South Korean TV football-variety show that debuted on 11 July 2015 on KBS2.
