= Football at the 2019 Summer Universiade =

Football at the XXX Summer Universiade
- Venue: various
- Dates: 2–13 July
- Teams: 12 (per gender)

The Football at the 2019 Summer Universiade in Naples was played between 2 and 13 July. 24 football teams participated in the tournament.

== Qualification ==
Following the FISU regulations, The maximum of 12 teams in football events where the number of entries is larger than the authorised participation level will be selected by

- The entry and the payment of guarantee.
- Those 6 teams finishing top rankings of the previous edition will be automatically qualified.
- Those 3 teams finishing bottom rankings of the previous edition will be replaced by new applying teams.
- The host is automatically qualified
- The remaining teams will be selected by wild card system according to geographical, continental representation, FISU ranking and FIFA ranking.

=== Qualified teams ===
==== Men's competition ====
Means of qualification	Date	Venue	Vacancies	Qualified
Host country	—	—	1	Italy
Top five of previous edition	18–29 August 2017	(Taiwan) Taipei	5	Japan; France; Mexico; Uruguay; Russia
Continental Quotas		(Switzerland) Lausanne	4	Ukraine; Brazil; South Korea; South Africa
Wild card		(Italy) Naples	2	Argentina; Republic of Ireland
Total			12	

==== Women's competition ====
Means of qualification	Date	Venue	Vacancies	Qualified
Host country	—	—	1	Italy
Top six of previous edition	17–28 August 2017	(Taiwan) Taipei	6	Brazil; Japan; Russia; South Africa; United States; South Korea
Continental Quotas		(Switzerland) Lausanne	2	Canada; China
Wild card		(Italy) Naples	3	North Korea; Republic of Ireland; Mexico
Total			12	

== Draw ==
Following the FISU regulations, draw of pool will be based on following by.

- Previous Summer Universiade results
- Participation in previous Summer Universiades
- Continental representation
- FIFA rankings

=== Men's competition ===
Pot 1	Pot 2	Pot 3
Japan (1); France (2); Mexico (3); Uruguay (4)	Italy (5); Russia (6); Ukraine (7); Argentina (8)	Brazil (9); South Korea (11); South Africa (12); Republic of Ireland (13)

=== Women's competition ===
Pot 1	Pot 2	Pot 3
Brazil (1); Japan (2); Russia (3); South Africa (4)	United States (5); South Korea (6); Mexico (7); Canada (8)	Republic of Ireland (10); Italy (11); China (12); North Korea (13)

== Pools composition ==
=== Men's competition ===
Pool A	Pool B	Pool C	Pool D
South Korea	Italy	France	Argentina
Uruguay	Mexico	South Africa	Russia
Republic of Ireland	Ukraine	Brazil	Japan

=== Women's competition ===
Pool A	Pool B	Pool C	Pool D
North Korea	Mexico	Republic of Ireland	Italy
Canada	Russia	Brazil	Japan
South Africa	China	South Korea	United States

== Medal summary ==
=== Medal table ===
Rank	Nation	Gold	Silver	Bronze	Total
1	Japan (JPN)	1	1	0	2
2	North Korea (PRK)	1	0	0	1
3	Brazil (BRA)	0	1	0	1
4	Italy (ITA)*	0	0	1	1
4	Russia (RUS)	0	0	1	1
Totals (5 entries)		2	2	2	6

=== Medal events ===
Event	Gold	Silver	Bronze
Men	Japan (JPN)	Brazil (BRA)	Italy (ITA)
Women	North Korea (PRK)	Japan (JPN)	Russia (RUS)
