= Football at the 2017 Summer Universiade =

Football at the XXIX Summer Universiade
- Venue: 4
- Dates: 18–29 August 2017
- Teams: 16 (men); 13 (women)

Football was contested at the 2017 Summer Universiade from August 18 to 29 in Taipei, Taiwan.

== Medal summary ==
=== Medal table ===
Rank	Nation	Gold	Silver	Bronze	Total
1	Japan (JPN)	1	1	0	2
2	Brazil (BRA)	1	0	0	1
3	France (FRA)	0	1	0	1
4	Mexico (MEX)	0	0	1	1
4	Russia (RUS)	0	0	1	1
Totals (5 entries)		2	2	2	6

=== Medal events ===
Event	Gold	Silver	Bronze
Men	Japan (JPN)	France (FRA)	Mexico (MEX)
Women	Brazil (BRA)	Japan (JPN)	Russia (RUS)

== Men ==
Sixteen teams participated in the men's tournament.

=== Teams ===
Pool A

- Chinese Taipei
- Republic of Ireland
- France
- Mexico

Pool B

- Japan
- Uruguay
- Canada
- Malaysia

Pool C

- Italy
- Brazil
- Russia
- United States

Pool D

- South Korea
- South Africa
- Ukraine
- Argentina

== Women ==
Thirteen teams participated in the women's tournament.

=== Teams ===
Pool A

- Chinese Taipei
- South Korea
- United States
- Argentina

Pool B

- Canada
- Mexico
- Republic of Ireland

Pool C

- Japan
- Brazil
- Colombia

Pool D

- Russia
- Great Britain
- South Africa
