= Football at the 1979 Summer Universiade =

Football was contested for men only at the 1979 Summer Universiade in Mexico City, Mexico.

Event	Gold	Silver	Bronze
Men's football	Mexico (MEX)	Uruguay (URU)	Romania (ROU)
