= Football at the 1985 Summer Universiade =

Football was contested for men only at the 1985 Summer Universiade in Kobe, Japan.

== Venues ==
Kobe
Kobe Central Football Stadium	Kobe Oji Stadium
Capacity: 13,000	Capacity: 3,000

== Medal List ==
Event	Gold	Silver	Bronze
Men's football	North Korea (PRK)	Uruguay (URU)	China (CHN)
