= Football at the 1991 Summer Universiade =

Football was contested for men only at the 1991 Summer Universiade in Sheffield, United Kingdom.

Event	Gold	Silver	Bronze
Men's football	South Korea (KOR)	Netherlands (NED)	Great Britain (GBR)
