= Football at the 2001 Summer Universiade =

The Football competitions in the 2001 Summer Universiade were held in Beijing, China.

== Venues ==
Beijing
Workers' Stadium	Fengtai Stadium	Haidian Stadium	Peking University May Fourth Stadium
Capacity: 80,000	Capacity: 31,043	Capacity: 1,000	Capacity: 1,000
Beijing
Tsinghua University Stadium	Beijing Sport University Stadium	Capital Normal University stadium	Xiannongtan Stadium
Capacity: 1,000	Capacity: 1,000	Capacity: 1,000	Capacity: 24,000

== Medalists ==
Event	Gold	Silver	Bronze
Men	Japan	Ukraine; Dmytro Kozachenko; Vadym Zhukov; Vasyl Hrechanyi; Yevhen Bredun; Oleh Shkred; Dmytro Kondratovych; Andriy Yerokhin; Vitaliy Bielikov; Serhiy Klyuchyk; Oleksandr Batrachenko; Ivan Oleksiyenko; Volodymyr Brayila; Dmytro Bermudes; Oleksandr Antonenko; Ivan Kozoriz; Oleksiy Telyatnykov; Myroslav Bundash; Yaroslav Skydan	South Korea
Women	Brazil	Netherlands	South Korea
