= Football at the 2015 Summer Universiade =

Football at the XXVIII Summer Universiade
- Venue: various
- Dates: July 2, 2015 – July 13, 2015
- Teams: 16 (men); 15 (women)

Football was contested at the 2015 Summer Universiade from July 2 to 13 in Gwangju, South Korea.

== Venues ==
Gwangju	Naju	Boseong	Yeonggwang
Honam University Football Field	Naju Public Stadium	Boseong Public Stadium	Yeonggwang Sportium Football Field
Capacity: 500	Capacity: 7,110	Capacity: 4,046	Capacity: 2,079
Mokpo	Gochang	Jeongeup	
Mokpo International Football Center	Gochang Public Stadium	Jeongeup Public Stadium	
Capacity: 5,952	Capacity: 7,000	Capacity: 12,031	

== Medal summary ==
=== Medal table ===
Rank	Nation	Gold	Silver	Bronze	Total
1	France (FRA)	1	0	0	1
1	Italy (ITA)	1	0	0	1
3	Russia (RUS)	0	1	0	1
3	South Korea (KOR)	0	1	0	1
5	Japan (JPN)	0	0	2	2
Totals (5 entries)		2	2	2	6

=== Medal events ===
Event	Gold	Silver	Bronze
Men	Italy	South Korea	Japan
Women	France	Russia	Japan

== Men ==
Sixteen teams participated in the men's tournament.

=== Teams ===
Pool A

- South Korea
- Canada
- Italy
- Chinese Taipei

Pool B

- France
- South Africa
- Ukraine
- Mexico

Pool C

- Japan
- Brazil
- Malaysia
- Iran

Pool D

- Russia
- Republic of Ireland
- Uruguay
- China

== Women ==
Fifteen teams participated in the women's tournament.

=== Teams ===
Pool A

- South Korea
- Republic of Ireland
- Chinese Taipei
- Czech Republic

Pool B

- Mexico
- Japan
- Russia
- Colombia

Pool C

- Brazil
- China
- Poland

Pool D

- South Africa
- France
- Canada
- United States
