= Football at the 2003 Summer Universiade =

== Venues ==
Daegu
Daegu Civic Stadium	Suseong Civic Stadium	Gangbyeon Football Stadium
Capacity: 19,467	Capacity: 3,190	Capacity: 200
Gimcheon	Gumi	
Gimcheon Stadium	Gumi Civic Stadium	
Capacity: 25,000	Capacity: 35,000	

Event	Gold	Silver	Bronze
Men's football	Japan	Italy	Czech Republic

Event	Gold	Silver	Bronze
Women's football	North Korea	Japan	China
