= Football at the 1999 Summer Universiade =

Football was contested for men only at the 1999 Summer Universiade in Palma, Spain.

Event	Gold	Silver	Bronze
Men's football	Spain (ESP)	Italy (ITA)	Brazil (BRA)
