= Football at the 2005 Summer Universiade =

This table shows medal results for football at the 2005 Summer Universiade.

Event	Gold	Silver	Bronze
Men's football	Japan	Italy	Morocco
Women's football	Brazil	China	Japan
