= Football at the 1993 Summer Universiade =

Men's football events were contested at the 1993 Summer Universiade in Buffalo, New York, United States and in Hamilton, Ontario, Canada.

Event	Gold	Silver	Bronze
Men's	Czech Republic (CZE)	South Korea (KOR)	Germany (GER)
Women's	China (CHN)	United States (USA)	Russia (RUS)
