= Football at the 1995 Summer Universiade =

Football was contested for men only at the 1995 Summer Universiade in Fukuoka, Japan.

== Venues ==
Fukuoka
| Hakatanomori Athletic Stadium | Hakatanomori Football Stadium |
| Capacity: 30,000 | Capacity: 21,562 |

== Medal table ==
| Event | Gold | Silver | Bronze |
|---|---|---|---|
| Men's football | Japan (JPN) | South Korea (KOR) | Russia (RUS) |
