= Football at the 1997 Summer Universiade =

Event	Gold	Silver	Bronze
Men's	Italy (ITA)	South Korea (KOR)	United States (USA)
