= 2001 FIFA Confederations Cup squads =

== Group A ==
=== Australia ===
Head coach: Frank Farina

No.	Pos.	Player	Date of birth (age)	Caps	Club
1	GK	Mark Schwarzer	6 October 1972 (aged 28)		(England) Middlesbrough
2	DF	Kevin Muscat	7 August 1973 (aged 27)		(England) Wolverhampton Wanderers
3	DF	Craig Moore	12 December 1975 (aged 25)		(Scotland) Rangers
4	MF	Paul Okon (c)	5 April 1972 (aged 29)		(England) Middlesbrough
5	DF	Tony Vidmar	4 July 1970 (aged 30)		(Scotland) Rangers
6	DF	Tony Popovic	4 July 1973 (aged 27)		(Japan) Sanfrecce Hiroshima
7	MF	Josip Skoko	10 December 1975 (aged 25)		(Belgium) Racing Genk
8	DF	Stan Lazaridis	16 August 1972 (aged 28)		(England) Birmingham City
9	FW	John Aloisi	5 February 1976 (aged 25)		(England) Coventry City
10	MF	Brett Emerton	22 February 1979 (aged 22)		(Netherlands) Feyenoord
11	FW	David Zdrilic	13 April 1974 (aged 27)		(Germany) SpVgg Unterhaching
12	GK	Clint Bolton	22 August 1975 (aged 25)		(Australia) Sydney Olympic
13	MF	Mark Bresciano	11 February 1980 (aged 21)		(Italy) Empoli
14	DF	Shaun Murphy	5 November 1970 (aged 30)		(England) Sheffield United
15	DF	Hayden Foxe	23 June 1977 (aged 23)		(England) West Ham United
16	DF	Steve Horvat	14 March 1971 (aged 30)		(Australia) Melbourne Knights
17	MF	Steve Corica	24 March 1973 (aged 28)		(Japan) Sanfrecce Hiroshima
18	DF	Scott Chipperfield	30 December 1975 (aged 25)		(Australia) Wollongong Wolves
19	MF	Aurelio Vidmar	3 February 1967 (aged 34)		(Australia) Adelaide City
20	FW	Clayton Zane	12 July 1977 (aged 23)		(Norway) Lillestrøm
21	FW	Archie Thompson	23 October 1978 (aged 22)		(Australia) Marconi Stallions
22	FW	Mile Sterjovski	27 May 1979 (aged 22)		(France) Lille
23	GK	Frank Juric	28 October 1973 (aged 27)		(Germany) Bayer Leverkusen

=== France ===
Head coach: Roger Lemerre

No.	Pos.	Player	Date of birth (age)	Caps	Club
1	GK	Ulrich Ramé	19 September 1972 (aged 28)		(France) Bordeaux
2	DF	Willy Sagnol	18 March 1977 (aged 24)		(Germany) Bayern Munich
3	DF	Bixente Lizarazu	9 December 1969 (aged 31)		(Germany) Bayern Munich
4	MF	Patrick Vieira	23 June 1976 (aged 24)		(England) Arsenal
5	DF	Nicolas Gillet	8 November 1976 (aged 24)		(France) Nantes
6	FW	Youri Djorkaeff	9 March 1968 (aged 33)		(Germany) 1. FC Kaiserslautern
7	MF	Robert Pires	29 October 1973 (aged 27)		(England) Arsenal
8	DF	Marcel Desailly (c)	7 September 1968 (aged 32)		(England) Chelsea
9	FW	Nicolas Anelka	14 March 1979 (aged 22)		(France) Paris Saint-Germain
10	MF	Eric Carrière	24 May 1973 (aged 28)		(France) Nantes
11	FW	Sylvain Wiltord	10 May 1974 (aged 27)		(England) Arsenal
12	GK	Grégory Coupet	31 December 1972 (aged 28)		(France) Lyon
13	DF	Mikaël Silvestre	9 August 1977 (aged 23)		(England) Manchester United
14	FW	Frédéric Née	18 April 1975 (aged 26)		(France) Bastia
15	MF	Jérémie Bréchet	14 August 1979 (aged 21)		(France) Lyon
16	MF	Olivier Dacourt	25 September 1974 (aged 26)		(England) Leeds United
17	FW	Steve Marlet	10 January 1974 (aged 27)		(France) Lyon
18	DF	Frank Leboeuf	22 January 1968 (aged 33)		(England) Chelsea
19	DF	Christian Karembeu	3 December 1970 (aged 30)		(England) Middlesbrough
20	DF	Zoumana Camara	3 April 1979 (aged 22)		(France) Marseille
21	FW	Christophe Dugarry	24 March 1972 (aged 29)		(France) Bordeaux
22	MF	Laurent Robert	21 May 1975 (aged 26)		(France) Paris Saint-Germain
23	GK	Mickaël Landreau	14 May 1979 (aged 22)		(France) Nantes

=== Mexico ===
Head coach: Enrique Meza

No.	Pos.	Player	Date of birth (age)	Caps	Club
1	GK	Oswaldo Sánchez	21 September 1973 (aged 27)		(Mexico) Guadalajara
2	DF	Claudio Suárez (c)	17 December 1968 (aged 32)		(Mexico) Tigres UANL
3	DF	Joaquín Beltrán	29 April 1977 (aged 24)		(Mexico) Pumas UNAM
4	DF	David Oteo	27 July 1973 (aged 27)		(Mexico) Tigres UANL
5	MF	Duilio Davino	21 March 1976 (aged 25)		(Mexico) América
6	MF	Marco Antonio Ruiz	12 July 1969 (aged 31)		(Mexico) Guadalajara
7	MF	David Rangel	12 November 1969 (aged 31)		(Mexico) Toluca
8	MF	Juan Pablo Rodríguez	7 August 1979 (aged 21)		(Mexico) Atlas
9	MF	José Manuel Abundis	11 June 1973 (aged 27)		(Mexico) Atlante
10	FW	Jared Borgetti	14 August 1973 (aged 27)		(Mexico) Santos Laguna
11	FW	Daniel Osorno	16 March 1979 (aged 22)		(Mexico) Atlas
12	GK	Erubey Cabuto	6 September 1975 (aged 25)		(Mexico) Atlas
13	MF	Pável Pardo	26 July 1976 (aged 24)		(Mexico) América
14	MF	Germán Villa	2 April 1973 (aged 28)		(Mexico) América
15	FW	Antonio de Nigris	1 April 1978 (aged 23)		(Mexico) Monterrey
16	MF	Alberto Coyote	26 March 1967 (aged 34)		(Mexico) Guadalajara
17	DF	Octavio Valdez	7 December 1973 (aged 27)		(Mexico) Pachuca
18	MF	Cesáreo Victorino	19 March 1979 (aged 22)		(Mexico) Pachuca
19	MF	Joaquín Reyes	20 February 1978 (aged 23)		(Mexico) Santos Laguna
20	MF	Víctor Ruiz	7 June 1969 (aged 31)		(Mexico) Toluca
21	MF	Luis Ernesto Pérez	12 January 1981 (aged 20)		(Mexico) Necaxa
22	DF	Hugo Chávez	16 October 1976 (aged 24)		(Mexico) Morelia
23	GK	Óscar Dautt	8 June 1976 (aged 24)		(Mexico) Puebla

=== South Korea ===
Head coach: (Netherlands) Guus Hiddink

No.	Pos.	Player	Date of birth (age)	Caps	Club
1	GK	Lee Woon-jae	26 April 1973 (aged 28)		(South Korea) Sangmu FC
2	DF	Kang Chul	2 November 1971 (aged 29)		(Austria) LASK Linz
3	DF	Choi Sung-yong	25 December 1975 (aged 25)		(Austria) LASK Linz
4	MF	Song Chong-gug	20 February 1979 (aged 22)		(South Korea) Busan I'Cons
5	DF	Park Yong-ho	25 March 1981 (aged 20)		(South Korea) Anyang LG Cheetahs
6	DF	Yoo Sang-chul	18 October 1971 (aged 29)		(Japan) Kashiwa Reysol
7	DF	Kim Tae-young	8 November 1970 (aged 30)		(South Korea) Jeonnam Dragons
8	MF	Yoon Jong-hwan	16 February 1973 (aged 28)		(Japan) Cerezo Osaka
9	FW	Kim Do-hoon	21 July 1970 (aged 30)		(South Korea) Jeonbuk Hyundai Motors
10	FW	Choi Yong-soo	10 September 1973 (aged 27)		(Japan) JEF United Ichihara
11	FW	Seol Ki-hyeon	8 January 1979 (aged 22)		(Belgium) Royal Antwerp
12	GK	Kim Yong-dae	11 October 1979 (aged 21)		(South Korea) Yonsei University
13	DF	Seo Deok-kyu	22 October 1978 (aged 22)		(South Korea) Ulsan Hyundai
14	MF	Seo Dong-won	14 August 1975 (aged 25)		(South Korea) Suwon Samsung Bluewings
15	DF	Lee Min-sung	23 June 1973 (aged 27)		(South Korea) Sangmu FC
16	FW	An Hyo-yeon	16 April 1978 (aged 23)		(Japan) Kyoto Purple Sanga
17	MF	Ha Seok-ju	20 February 1968 (aged 33)		(South Korea) Pohang Steelers
18	FW	Hwang Sun-hong	14 July 1968 (aged 32)		(Japan) Kashiwa Reysol
19	DF	Lee Young-pyo	23 April 1977 (aged 24)		(South Korea) Anyang LG Cheetahs
20	DF	Hong Myung-bo (c)	12 February 1969 (aged 32)		(Japan) Kashiwa Reysol
21	MF	Park Ji-sung	25 February 1981 (aged 20)		(Japan) Kyoto Purple Sanga
22	MF	Ko Jong-soo	30 October 1978 (aged 22)		(South Korea) Suwon Samsung Bluewings
23	GK	Choi Eun-sung	5 April 1971 (aged 30)		(South Korea) Daejeon Citizen

== Group B ==
=== Brazil ===
Head coach: Émerson Leão

No.	Pos.	Player	Date of birth (age)	Caps	Club
1	GK	Dida	7 October 1973 (aged 27)		(Italy) Milan
2	DF	Zé Maria	25 July 1973 (aged 27)		(Italy) Perugia
3	DF	Lúcio	8 May 1978 (aged 23)		(Germany) Bayer Leverkusen
4	DF	Edmílson	10 July 1976 (aged 24)		(France) Lyon
5	MF	Léomar	26 June 1971 (aged 29)		(Brazil) Sport Recife
6	DF	Gustavo Nery	22 July 1977 (aged 23)		(Brazil) São Paulo
7	FW	Leandro	6 August 1977 (aged 23)		(Italy) Fiorentina
8	MF	Vampeta (c)	13 March 1974 (aged 27)		(France) Paris Saint-Germain
9	FW	Sonny Anderson	19 September 1970 (aged 30)		(France) Lyon
10	MF	Robert	3 April 1971 (aged 30)		(Brazil) Santos
11	MF	Carlos Miguel	2 June 1972 (aged 28)		(Brazil) São Paulo
12	GK	Carlos Germano	14 August 1970 (aged 30)		(Brazil) Portuguesa
13	DF	Evanílson	12 September 1975 (aged 25)		(Germany) Borussia Dortmund
14	DF	César	16 November 1975 (aged 25)		(France) Rennes
15	DF	Caçapa	29 May 1976 (aged 25)		(France) Lyon
16	DF	Léo	6 July 1975 (aged 25)		(Brazil) Santos
17	MF	Vágner	19 March 1973 (aged 28)		(Spain) Celta Vigo
18	MF	Fábio Rochemback	10 December 1981 (aged 19)		(Brazil) Internacional
19	MF	Júlio Baptista	1 October 1981 (aged 19)		(Brazil) São Paulo
20	MF	Ramon Menezes	30 June 1972 (aged 28)		(Brazil) Fluminense
21	FW	Washington	1 April 1975 (aged 26)		(Brazil) Ponte Preta
22	FW	Magno Alves	13 January 1976 (aged 25)		(Brazil) Fluminense
23	GK	Fábio Costa	27 November 1977 (aged 23)		(Brazil) Santos

=== Cameroon ===
Head coach: (France) Pierre Lechantre

No.	Pos.	Player	Date of birth (age)	Caps	Club
1	GK	Alioum Boukar	3 January 1972 (aged 29)		(Turkey) Samsunspor
2	DF	Bill Tchato	14 May 1975 (aged 26)		(France) Montepellier
3	DF	Pierre Womé	26 March 1979 (aged 22)		(Italy) Bologna
4	DF	Rigobert Song (c)	1 July 1976 (aged 24)		(England) West Ham United
5	DF	Raymond Kalla	24 April 1975 (aged 26)		(Spain) Extremadura
6	DF	Pierre Njanka	15 March 1975 (aged 26)		(France) Strasbourg
7	FW	Bernard Tchoutang	2 September 1976 (aged 24)		(Netherlands) Roda JC
8	MF	Geremi	20 December 1978 (aged 22)		(Spain) Real Madrid
9	FW	Samuel Eto'o	10 March 1981 (aged 20)		(Spain) Mallorca
10	FW	Patrick M'Boma	15 November 1970 (aged 30)		(Italy) Parma
11	DF	Lauren	19 January 1977 (aged 24)		(England) Arsenal
12	GK	Jacques Songo'o	17 March 1964 (aged 37)		(Spain) Deportivo La Coruña
13	DF	Daniel Moncharé	24 January 1982 (aged 19)		(Cameroon) Sable
14	MF	Joël Epalle	20 February 1978 (aged 23)		(Greece) Panachaiki
15	MF	Nicolas Alnoudji	9 December 1979 (aged 21)		(Turkey) Çaykur Rizespor
16	DF	Olivier Tchatchoua	4 April 1982 (aged 19)		(Cameroon) Sable
17	MF	Marc-Vivien Foé	1 May 1975 (aged 26)		(France) Lyon
18	FW	Pius Ndiefi	5 July 1975 (aged 25)		(France) Sedan
19	DF	Michel Pensée	16 June 1973 (aged 27)		(Portugal) Desportivo das Aves
20	MF	Salomon Olembé	8 December 1980 (aged 20)		(France) Nantes
21	FW	Joseph-Désiré Job	1 December 1977 (aged 23)		(England) Middlesbrough
22	MF	Daniel N'Gom Kome	19 May 1980 (aged 21)		(Spain) Levante
23	GK	Carlos Kameni	18 February 1984 (aged 17)		(France) Le Havre

=== Canada ===
Head coach: (Germany) Holger Osieck

No.	Pos.	Player	Date of birth (age)	Caps	Club
1	GK	Craig Forrest	20 September 1967 (aged 33)		(England) West Ham United
2	MF	Jeff Clarke	18 October 1977 (aged 23)		(United States) Portland Timbers
3	DF	Mark Watson	8 September 1970 (aged 30)		(United States) D.C. United
4	DF	Tony Menezes	24 November 1974 (aged 26)		(Brazil) Botafogo
5	DF	Jason de Vos (c)	2 January 1974 (aged 27)		(Scotland) Dundee United
6	MF	Jason Bent	8 March 1977 (aged 24)		(Denmark) Copenhagen
7	MF	Paul Stalteri	18 October 1977 (aged 23)		(Germany) Werder Bremen
8	MF	Nick Dasovic	5 December 1968 (aged 32)		(Scotland) St Johnstone
9	FW	Carlo Corazzin	25 December 1971 (aged 29)		(England) Oldham Athletic
10	MF	Davide Xausa	10 March 1976 (aged 25)		(Scotland) Livingston
11	MF	Jim Brennan	8 May 1977 (aged 24)		(England) Nottingham Forest
12	GK	Pat Onstad	13 January 1968 (aged 33)		(United States) Rochester Rhinos
13	DF	Carl Fletcher	26 December 1971 (aged 29)		(Canada) Montreal Impact
14	MF	Daniel Imhof	22 November 1977 (aged 23)		(Switzerland) St. Gallen
15	MF	Richard Hastings	18 May 1977 (aged 24)		(Scotland) Inverness Caledonian Thistle
16	FW	Garret Kusch	26 September 1973 (aged 27)		(Norway) Hønefoss
17	FW	Dwayne De Rosario	15 May 1978 (aged 23)		(United States) San Jose Earthquakes
18	MF	Tam Nsaliwa	28 January 1982 (aged 19)		(Germany) 1. FC Nürnberg
19	FW	Paul Peschisolido	25 May 1971 (aged 30)		(England) Fulham
20	DF	Kevin McKenna	21 January 1980 (aged 21)		(Scotland) Heart of Midlothian
21	MF	Marc Bircham	11 May 1978 (aged 23)		(England) Millwall
23	GK	Mike Franks	20 April 1977 (aged 24)		(Scotland) Hibernian

=== Japan ===
Head coach: (France) Philippe Troussier

No.	Pos.	Player	Date of birth (age)	Caps	Goals	Club
1	GK	Yoshikatsu Kawaguchi	15 August 1975 (aged 25)	43	0	(Japan Football Association) Yokohama F. Marinos
2	DF	Kenichi Uemura	22 April 1974 (aged 27)	1	0	(Japan Football Association) Sanfrecce Hiroshima
3	DF	Naoki Matsuda	14 March 1977 (aged 24)	16	0	(Japan Football Association) Yokohama F. Marinos
4	DF	Ryuzo Morioka	7 October 1975 (aged 25)	23	0	(Japan Football Association) Shimizu S-Pulse
5	MF	Junichi Inamoto	18 September 1979 (aged 21)	17	0	(Japan Football Association) Gamba Osaka
6	DF	Toshihiro Hattori	23 September 1973 (aged 27)	26	1	(Japan Football Association) Júbilo Iwata
7	MF	Hidetoshi Nakata	22 January 1977 (aged 24)	35	6	(Italian Football Federation) Roma
8	MF	Hiroaki Morishima	30 April 1972 (aged 29)	48	10	(Japan Football Association) Cerezo Osaka
9	FW	Akinori Nishizawa	18 June 1976 (aged 24)	18	8	(Royal Spanish Football Federation) Espanyol
10	MF	Atsuhiro Miura	24 July 1974 (aged 26)	14	1	(Japan Football Association) Tokyo Verdy 1969
11	FW	Masashi Nakayama (c)	23 September 1967 (aged 33)	39	20	(Japan Football Association) Júbilo Iwata
12	GK	Seigo Narazaki	11 April 1976 (aged 25)	15	0	(Japan Football Association) Nagoya Grampus Eight
13	FW	Yoshiteru Yamashita	21 November 1977 (aged 23)	0	0	(Japan Football Association) Avispa Fukuoka
14	MF	Teruyoshi Ito	31 August 1974 (aged 26)	18	0	(Japan Football Association) Shimizu S-Pulse
15	MF	Toshiya Fujita	4 October 1971 (aged 29)	11	2	(Japan Football Association) Júbilo Iwata
16	DF	Kōji Nakata	9 July 1979 (aged 21)	9	0	(Japan Football Association) Kashima Antlers
17	MF	Tomokazu Myojin	24 January 1978 (aged 23)	11	2	(Japan Football Association) Kashiwa Reysol
18	MF	Kazuyuki Toda	30 December 1977 (aged 23)	0	0	(Japan Football Association) Shimizu S-Pulse
19	FW	Tatsuhiko Kubo	18 June 1976 (aged 24)	7	0	(Japan Football Association) Sanfrecce Hiroshima
20	DF	Yasuhiro Hato	4 May 1976 (aged 25)	1	0	(Japan Football Association) Yokohama F. Marinos
21	MF	Shinji Ono	27 September 1979 (aged 21)	15	1	(Japan Football Association) Urawa Red Diamonds
22	FW	Takayuki Suzuki	5 June 1976 (aged 24)	1	0	(Japan Football Association) Kashima Antlers
23	GK	Ryōta Tsuzuki	18 April 1978 (aged 23)	0	0	(Japan Football Association) Gamba Osaka
