= 2001 FIFA Confederations Cup Group B =

Football tournament group stage

Group A of the 2001 FIFA Confederations Cup took place between 31 May and 4 June 2001. Japan won the group, and advanced to the knockout stage, along with group runners-up Brazil. Cameroon and Canada failed to advance.

== Standings ==
Team	Pld	W	D	L	GF	GA	GD	Pts
Japan	3	2	1	0	5	0	+5	7
Brazil	3	1	2	0	2	0	+2	5
Cameroon	3	1	0	2	2	4	−2	3
Canada	3	0	1	2	0	5	−5	1

== Results ==
=== Brazil v Cameroon ===
31 May 2001
17:00 JST

Brazil	2–0	Cameroon
Washington 53'; Carlos Miguel 57'	Report

Kashima Soccer Stadium, Ibaraki
Attendance: 10,519
Referee: Hellmut Krug (Germany)

Brazil	Cameroon

GK	1	Dida
DF	2	Zé Maria	(yellow card) 15'
DF	3	Lúcio		(substituted off) 76'
DF	4	Edmílson
DF	16	Léo
MF	5	Léomar
MF	8	Vampeta		(substituted off) 46'
MF	17	Vágner		(substituted off) 46'
MF	20	Ramon
FW	9	Sonny Anderson
FW	21	Washington
Substitutions:
MF	11	Carlos Miguel		(substituted on) 46'
MF	18	Fábio Rochemback		(substituted on) 46'
DF	15	Caçapa		(substituted on) 76'
Manager:
Émerson Leão

GK	1	Alioum Boukar
DF	3	Pierre Womé
DF	4	Rigobert Song	(yellow card) 78'
DF	5	Raymond Kalla	(yellow card) 11'
DF	6	Pierre Njanka
MF	8	Geremi Njitap
MF	15	Nicolas Alnoudji		(substituted off) 76'
MF	17	Marc-Vivien Foé	(yellow card) 5'
MF	20	Salomon Olembé
FW	9	Samuel Eto'o	(yellow card) 58'
FW	10	Patrick M'Boma		(substituted off) 77'
Substitutions:
MF	14	Joël Epalle		(substituted on) 76'
FW	21	Joseph-Désiré Job		(substituted on) 77'
Manager:
(France) Pierre Lechantre

=== Japan v Canada ===
31 May 2001
19:30 JST

Japan	3–0	Canada
Ono 57'; Nishizawa 60'; Morishima 88'	Report

Niigata Stadium, Niigata
Attendance: 39,006
Referee: Simon Micallef (Australia)

Japan	Canada

GK	1	Yoshikatsu Kawaguchi
DF	2	Kenichi Uemura		(substituted off) 38'
DF	4	Ryuzo Morioka
DF	16	Kōji Nakata
DF	18	Kazuyuki Toda
MF	5	Junichi Inamoto	(yellow card) 66'
MF	7	Hidetoshi Nakata		(substituted off) 81'
MF	14	Teruyoshi Ito		(substituted off) 67'
MF	21	Shinji Ono
FW	8	Hiroaki Morishima
FW	9	Akinori Nishizawa
Substitutions:
FW	11	Masashi Nakayama		(substituted on) 38'
MF	17	Tomokazu Myojin		(substituted on) 67'
MF	10	Atsuhiro Miura		(substituted on) 81'
Manager:
(France) Philippe Troussier

GK	1	Craig Forrest
DF	3	Mark Watson
DF	5	Jason de Vos
DF	13	Carl Fletcher
DF	20	Kevin McKenna	(yellow card) 51'
MF	6	Jason Bent
MF	7	Paul Stalteri
MF	11	Jim Brennan
MF	14	Daniel Imhof		(substituted off) 63'
FW	19	Paul Peschisolido
FW	10	Davide Xausa		(substituted off) 79'
Substitutions:
MF	18	Tam Nsaliwa		(substituted on) 63'
FW	9	Carlo Corazzin		(substituted on) 79'
Manager:
(Germany) Holger Osieck

=== Canada v Brazil ===
2 June 2001
17:00 JST

Canada	0–0	Brazil
	Report

Kashima Soccer Stadium, Ibaraki
Attendance: 12,095
Referee: Lu Jun (China)

Canada	Brazil

GK	1	Craig Forrest
DF	3	Mark Watson		(substituted off) 69'
DF	4	Tony Menezes
DF	5	Jason de Vos	(yellow card) 67'
DF	20	Kevin McKenna
MF	6	Jason Bent
MF	7	Paul Stalteri
MF	8	Nick Dasovic
MF	11	Jim Brennan
FW	19	Paul Peschisolido		(substituted off) 84'
FW	10	Davide Xausa		(substituted off) 46'
Substitutions:
FW	9	Carlo Corazzin		(substituted on) 46'
DF	13	Carl Fletcher		(substituted on) 69'
FW	17	Dwayne De Rosario		(substituted on) 84'
Manager:
(Germany) Holger Osieck

GK	1	Dida
DF	2	Zé Maria
DF	3	Lúcio
DF	4	Edmílson
DF	16	Léo
MF	5	Léomar
MF	11	Carlos Miguel	(yellow card) 52'	(substituted off) 70'
MF	18	Fábio Rochemback
MF	20	Ramon		(substituted off) 64'
FW	9	Sonny Anderson		(substituted off) 22'
FW	21	Washington
Substitutions:
FW	7	Leandro		(substituted on) 22'
FW	22	Magno Alves		(substituted on) 64'
MF	10	Robert		(substituted on) 70'
Manager:
Émerson Leão

=== Cameroon v Japan ===
2 June 2001
19:30 JST

Cameroon	0–2	Japan
	Report	Suzuki 8', 65'

Niigata Stadium, Niigata
Attendance: 39,430
Referee: Benito Archundia (Mexico)

Cameroon	Japan

GK	1	Alioum Boukar
DF	3	Pierre Womé		(substituted off) 76'
DF	4	Rigobert Song
DF	5	Raymond Kalla
DF	6	Pierre Njanka	(yellow card) 84'
MF	8	Geremi Njitap		(substituted off) 55'
MF	15	Nicolas Alnoudji
MF	17	Marc-Vivien Foé
MF	20	Salomon Olembé		(substituted off) 55'
FW	9	Samuel Eto'o
FW	10	Patrick M'Boma
Substitutions:
MF	14	Joël Epalle		(substituted on) 55'
FW	21	Joseph-Désiré Job		(substituted on) 55'
DF	2	Bill Tchato		(substituted on) 76'
Manager:
(France) Pierre Lechantre

GK	1	Yoshikatsu Kawaguchi
DF	3	Naoki Matsuda
DF	4	Ryuzo Morioka
DF	16	Kōji Nakata
DF	18	Kazuyuki Toda	(yellow card) 67'
MF	5	Junichi Inamoto
MF	7	Hidetoshi Nakata		(substituted off) 61'
MF	17	Tomokazu Myojin
MF	21	Shinji Ono		(substituted off) 85'
FW	9	Akinori Nishizawa		(substituted off) 73'
FW	22	Takayuki Suzuki
Substitutions:
MF	8	Hiroaki Morishima		(substituted on) 61'
FW	11	Masashi Nakayama		(substituted on) 73'
MF	6	Toshihiro Hattori		(substituted on) 85'
Manager:
(France) Philippe Troussier

=== Brazil v Japan ===
4 June 2001
19:30 JST

Brazil	0–0	Japan
	Report

Kashima Soccer Stadium, Ibaraki
Attendance: 37,740
Referee: Kim Milton Nielsen (Denmark)

Brazil	Japan

GK	1	Dida
DF	2	Zé Maria
DF	3	Lúcio	(yellow card) 25'
DF	4	Edmílson
DF	16	Léo
MF	5	Léomar
MF	11	Carlos Miguel		(substituted off) 73'
MF	18	Fábio Rochemback	(yellow card) 88'
MF	20	Ramon	(yellow card) 31'	(substituted off) 62'
FW	7	Leandro
FW	21	Washington		(substituted off) 80'
Substitutions:
MF	19	Júlio Baptista		(substituted on) 62'
FW	22	Magno Alves		(substituted on) 80'
MF	10	Robert		(substituted on) 73'
Manager:
Émerson Leão

GK	23	Ryōta Tsuzuki
DF	2	Kenichi Uemura
DF	3	Naoki Matsuda
DF	6	Toshihiro Hattori
DF	20	Yasuhiro Hato
MF	7	Hidetoshi Nakata
MF	14	Teruyoshi Ito
MF	17	Tomokazu Myojin	(yellow card) 41'
MF	21	Shinji Ono		(substituted off) 46'
FW	13	Yoshiteru Yamashita		(substituted off) 60'
FW	22	Takayuki Suzuki	(yellow card) 45'	(substituted off) 46'
Substitutions:
MF	8	Hiroaki Morishima		(substituted on) 46'
DF	16	Kōji Nakata		(substituted on) 46'
FW	11	Masashi Nakayama		(substituted on) 60'
Manager:
(France) Philippe Troussier

=== Cameroon v Canada ===
4 June 2001
19:30 JST

Cameroon	2–0	Canada
Tchoutang 48'; M'Boma 83'	Report

Niigata Stadium, Niigata
Attendance: 15,822
Referee: Byron Moreno (Ecuador)

Cameroon	Canada

GK	12	Jacques Songo'o
DF	4	Rigobert Song
DF	5	Raymond Kalla
DF	6	Pierre Njanka
MF	8	Geremi Njitap
MF	14	Joël Epalle	(substituted off) 53'
MF	15	Nicolas Alnoudji
MF	17	Marc-Vivien Foé	(substituted off) 70'
MF	20	Salomon Olembé
FW	7	Bernard Tchoutang	(substituted off) 70'
FW	18	Pius Ndiefi
Substitutions:
FW	9	Samuel Eto'o	(substituted on) 53'
DF	3	Pierre Womé	(substituted on) 70'
FW	10	Patrick M'Boma	(substituted on) 70'
Manager:
(France) Pierre Lechantre

GK	1	Craig Forrest
DF	4	Tony Menezes
DF	5	Jason de Vos
DF	7	Paul Stalteri
DF	13	Carl Fletcher
MF	6	Jason Bent
MF	8	Nick Dasovic
MF	11	Jim Brennan
MF	14	Daniel Imhof
FW	9	Carlo Corazzin	(substituted off) 76'
FW	16	Garret Kusch	(substituted off) 46'
Substitutions:
FW	17	Dwayne De Rosario	(substituted on) 46'
FW	19	Paul Peschisolido	(substituted on) 76'
Manager:
(Germany) Holger Osieck
