= 2001 FIFA Confederations Cup knockout stage =

Football tournament knockout stage

The knockout stage of the 2001 FIFA Confederations Cup began on 7 June with the semi-final round, and concluded on 10 June 2001 with the final at the International Stadium Yokohama in Yokohama. The top two teams from each group advanced to the knockout stage to compete in a single-elimination style tournament. A third place match was included and played between the two losing teams of the semi-finals.

In the knockout stage (including the final), if a match was level at the end of 90 minutes, extra time of two periods (15 minutes each) would be played. If the score was still level after extra time, the match would be decided by a penalty shoot-out. Additionally, a golden goal rule was used, according to which if the goal is scored during the extra time, the game ends immediately and the scoring team becomes the winner.

== Qualified teams ==
Group	Winners	Runners-up
A	France	Australia
B	Japan	Brazil

== Bracket ==
Semi-finals
7 June – Yokohama
Japan	1
Australia	0
7 June – Suwon
France	2
Brazil	1

Final
10 June – Yokohama
Japan	0
France	1
Third place
9 June – Ulsan
Australia	1
Brazil	0

== Semi-finals ==
=== Japan v Australia ===
7 June 2001
17:00 JST

Japan	1–0	Australia
H. Nakata 43'	Report

International Stadium Yokohama, Yokohama
Attendance: 48,699
Referee: Benito Archundia (Mexico)

Japan	Australia

GK	1	Yoshikatsu Kawaguchi
DF	3	Naoki Matsuda
DF	4	Ryuzo Morioka		(substituted off) 22'
DF	16	Kōji Nakata
DF	20	Yasuhiro Hato
MF	5	Junichi Inamoto
MF	7	Hidetoshi Nakata (c)
MF	18	Kazuyuki Toda
MF	21	Shinji Ono		(substituted off) 55'
FW	9	Akinori Nishizawa		(substituted off) 80'
FW	22	Takayuki Suzuki	(red card) 56'
Substitutions:
DF	2	Kenichi Uemura		(substituted on) 22'
DF	6	Toshihiro Hattori		(substituted on) 55'
MF	8	Hiroaki Morishima		(substituted on) 80'
Manager:
(France) Philippe Troussier

GK	1	Mark Schwarzer
DF	2	Kevin Muscat
DF	3	Craig Moore	(yellow card) 87' (yellow-red card) 88'
DF	5	Tony Vidmar	(yellow card) 66'
DF	6	Tony Popovic	(yellow card) 42'
MF	4	Paul Okon (c)
MF	8	Stan Lazaridis
MF	13	Mark Bresciano		(substituted off) 60'
MF	17	Steve Corica
MF	18	Scott Chipperfield	(yellow card) 14'	(substituted off) 60'
FW	11	David Zdrilic		(substituted off) 71'
Substitutions:
FW	9	John Aloisi		(substituted on) 60'
FW	22	Mile Sterjovski		(substituted on) 60'
FW	21	Archie Thompson		(substituted on) 71'
Manager:
Frank Farina

=== France v Brazil ===
7 June 2001
20:00 KST

France	2–1	Brazil
Pires 7'; Desailly 54'	Report	Ramon 30'

Suwon World Cup Stadium, Suwon
Attendance: 34,527
Referee: Gamal Al-Ghandour (Egypt)

France	Brazil

GK	1	Ulrich Ramé
DF	2	Willy Sagnol	(yellow card) 41'
DF	3	Bixente Lizarazu
DF	8	Marcel Desailly (c)
DF	18	Frank Leboeuf
MF	4	Patrick Vieira
MF	6	Youri Djorkaeff	(yellow card) 61'	(substituted off) 61'
MF	7	Robert Pires
MF	19	Christian Karembeu	(yellow card) 29'
FW	9	Nicolas Anelka
FW	11	Sylvain Wiltord		(substituted off) 86'
Substitutions:
MF	10	Eric Carrière	(yellow card) 89'	(substituted on) 61'
MF	22	Laurent Robert		(substituted on) 86'
Manager:
Roger Lemerre

GK	1	Dida
DF	2	Zé Maria	(yellow card) 41'
DF	3	Lúcio
DF	4	Edmílson
DF	16	Léo	(yellow card) 20'
MF	5	Léomar (c)	(yellow card) 76'
MF	11	Carlos Miguel		(substituted off) 69'
MF	18	Fábio Rochemback
MF	20	Ramon
FW	7	Leandro		(substituted off) 56'
FW	21	Washington
Substitutions:
MF	8	Vampeta		(substituted on) 56'
MF	10	Robert		(substituted on) 69'
Manager:
Émerson Leão

== Third-place match ==
9 June 2001
19:00 KST

Australia	1–0	Brazil
Murphy 84'	Report

Ulsan Munsu Football Stadium, Ulsan
Attendance: 28,520
Referee: Hellmut Krug (Germany)

Australia	Brazil

GK	1	Mark Schwarzer
DF	5	Tony Vidmar
DF	6	Tony Popovic
DF	14	Shaun Murphy
DF	16	Steve Horvat
MF	7	Josip Skoko	(substituted off) 71'
MF	8	Stan Lazaridis
MF	17	Steve Corica	(substituted off) 61'
MF	18	Scott Chipperfield
FW	11	David Zdrilic
FW	20	Clayton Zane
Substitutions:
FW	22	Mile Sterjovski	(substituted on) 61'
MF	13	Mark Bresciano	(substituted on) 71'
Manager:
Frank Farina

GK	1	Dida
DF	2	Zé Maria
DF	4	Edmílson
DF	15	Caçapa
DF	16	Léo
MF	8	Vampeta
MF	11	Carlos Miguel	(substituted off) 66'
MF	18	Fábio Rochemback	(substituted off) 90+1'
MF	20	Ramon
FW	21	Washington
FW	22	Magno Alves
Substitutions:
MF	19	Júlio Baptista	(substituted on) 66'
FW	7	Leandro	(substituted on) 90+1'
Manager:
Émerson Leão

== Final ==
10 June 2001
19:00 JST

Japan	0–1	France
	Report	Vieira 30'

International Stadium Yokohama, Yokohama
Attendance: 65,533
Referee: Ali Bujsaim (United Arab Emirates)

Japan	France

GK	1	Yoshikatsu Kawaguchi
RB	20	Yasuhiro Hato
CB	4	Ryuzo Morioka (c)
CB	3	Naoki Matsuda	(yellow card) 36'
LB	16	Kōji Nakata
RM	5	Junichi Inamoto		(substituted off) 46'
CM	14	Teruyoshi Ito
CM	18	Kazuyuki Toda
LM	21	Shinji Ono		(substituted off) 60'
CF	8	Hiroaki Morishima	(yellow card) 89'
CF	9	Akinori Nishizawa		(substituted off) 74'
Substitutions:
MF	10	Atsuhiro Miura		(substituted on) 46'
FW	19	Tatsuhiko Kubo		(substituted on) 60'
FW	11	Masashi Nakayama		(substituted on) 74'
Manager:
(France) Philippe Troussier

GK	1	Ulrich Ramé
RB	19	Christian Karembeu
CB	18	Frank Leboeuf
CB	8	Marcel Desailly (c)
LB	3	Bixente Lizarazu	(yellow card) 52'
RM	6	Youri Djorkaeff		(substituted off) 65'
CM	4	Patrick Vieira
CM	7	Robert Pires
LM	11	Sylvain Wiltord
CF	9	Nicolas Anelka
CF	17	Steve Marlet		(substituted off) 58'
Substitutions:
FW	22	Laurent Robert		(substituted on) 58'
MF	10	Eric Carrière		(substituted on) 65'
Manager:
(France) Roger Lemerre
