= 2000–01 in Australian soccer =

Soccer in Australia
- Season: 2000–01

Men's soccer
- NSL Premiership: South Melbourne
- NSL Championship: Wollongong Wolves

Women's soccer
- WNSL Premiership: NSW Sapphires
- WNSL Championship: Canberra Eclipse

The 2000–01 season was the 32nd season of national competitive soccer in Australia and 118th overall. From July 2000 to June 2001, it was a highly active period for the game. The Socceroos participated in their second FIFA Confederations Cup, defying expectations yet again by finishing third, after finishing runners-up in the 1997 edition. They also broke several international records during World Cup Qualification in beating Tonga and America Samoa 22–0 and 31–0 respectively. The Matildas competed in the 2000 Olympic Games. Domestically, Wollongong Wolves won their second consecutive and overall National Soccer League grand final, in addition to winning the 2001 Oceania Club Championship and the NSW Sapphires were unbeaten in the Women's National Soccer League, with the grand final being won by the Canberra Eclipse.

== National teams ==
=== Men's senior ===
==== Friendlies ====
4 October 2000	Kuwait	0–1	Australia	Dubai, United Arab Emirates
		Report	Aloisi 49'	Stadium: Al Maktoum Stadium

7 October 2000	South Korea	4–2	Australia	Dubai, United Arab Emirates
	Jae-won 42'; Jung-yoon 49'; Ki-Hyeon 65'; Dong-gook 90' (pen.)	Report	Paul Agostino 36', 39'	Stadium: Al Maktoum Stadium

15 November 2000	Scotland	0–2	Australia	Glasgow, Scotland
		Report	Emerton 12'; Zdrillic 66'	Stadium: Hampden Park; Attendance: 30,985; Referee: Pascal Garibian (France)

28 February 2001	Colombia	3–2	Australia	Bogotá, Colombia
	Serna 12'; Salazar 66'; Grisales 75'	Report	Corica 77' (pen.); Chipperfield 90'	Stadium: Nemesio Camacho Stadium; Attendance: 2,071; Referee: Henry Cervantes

==== Confederations Cup ====
30 May 2001 Group stage	Mexico	0–2	Australia	Suwon, South Korea
19:30 KST		Report	Murphy 20'; Skoko 54'	Stadium: Suwon World Cup Stadium; Attendance: 6,232; Referee: Felix Tangawarima (Zimbabwe)

1 June 2001 Group stage	Australia	1–0	France	Daegu, South Korea
17:00 KST	Zane 60'	Report		Stadium: Daegu World Cup Stadium; Attendance: 44,400; Referee: Carlos Batres (Guatemala)

3 June 2001 Group stage	South Korea	1–0	Australia	Suwon, South Korea
19:30 KST	Hwang Sun-hong 24'	Report		Stadium: Suwon World Cup Stadium; Attendance: 42,754; Referee: Óscar Ruiz (Colombia)

7 June 2001 Semi-final	Japan	1–0	Australia	Yokohama, Japan
17:00 JST	H. Nakata 43'	Report		Stadium: International Stadium Yokohama; Attendance: 48,699; Referee: Benito Archundia (Mexico)

9 June 2001 Third-place match	Australia	1–0	Brazil	Ulsan, South Korea
19:00 KST	Murphy 84'	Report		Stadium: Ulsan Munsu Football Stadium; Attendance: 28,520; Referee: Hellmut Krug (Germany)

==== World Cup qualification ====
9 April 2001 First round	Tonga	0–22	Australia	Coffs Harbour, Australia
16:30		Report	Chipperfield 3', 83'; Mori 13', 23', 40', 58'; Aloisi 14', 24', 37', 45', 52', 63'; Muscat 18', 30', 54', 82'; Popovic 67'; Vidmar 74'; Zdrilic 78', 90'; Thompson 80'; Boutsianis 87'	Stadium: International Sports Stadium; Attendance: 1,500; Referee: Harry Attison (Vanuatu)

11 April 2001 First round	Australia	31–0	American Samoa	Coffs Harbour, Australia
19:00	Boutsianis 10', 50', 84'; Thompson 12', 23', 27', 29', 32', 37', 42', 45', 56', 60'; Thompson 65', 85', 88'; Zdrilic 13', 21', 25', 33', 58', 66', 78', 89'; Vidmar 14', 80'; Popovic 17', 19'; Colosimo 51', 81'; De Amicis 55'			Stadium: International Sports Stadium; Attendance: 3,000; Referee: Ronan Leaustic (Tahiti)

14 April 2001 First round	Fiji	0–2	Australia	Coffs Harbour, Australia
16:30		Report	Corica 23'; Foxe 81'	Stadium: International Sports Stadium; Attendance: 5,000; Referee: Derek Rugg (New Zealand)

16 April 2001 First round	Australia	11–0	Samoa	Coffs Harbour, Australia
16:30	A. Vidmar 5', 50'; Zdrillic 28', 57'; Foxe 44'; Popovic 55', 89'; Thompson 75', 88'; Chipperfield 76'; Bureta 81' (o.g.)	Report		Stadium: International Sports Stadium; Attendance: 2,000; Referee: Brian Precious (New Zealand)

20 June 2001 Second round	New Zealand	0–2	Australia	Wellington, New Zealand
19:30		(report)	Emerton 5', 80'	Stadium: WestpacTrust Stadium; Attendance: 19,500; Referee: Masayoshi Okada (Japan)

24 June 2001 Second round	Australia	4–1	New Zealand	Sydney, Australia
15:00	Zdrilic 5', 82'; Emerton 40'; Aloisi 56'	(report)	Coveny 44' (pen.)	Stadium: Stadium Australia; Attendance: 41,976; Referee: Kwon Jong-Chul (South Korea)

=== Women's senior ===
==== Friendlies ====
8 August 2000	North Korea	2–0	Australia	Pyongyang, North Korea
	Song Ok Jo 6'; Sol Yong Suk 68 68'	http://www.ozfootball.net/ark/Matildas/reports/vNK2000a.html Report		Stadium: Yonggakdo Stadium

11 August 2000	North Korea	2–1	Australia	Pyongyang, North Korea
	Song Ok Jo ? 68'; Ri Kyong Ae 92'	(Report)	Forman 81'	Stadium: Yonggakdo Stadium

17 August 2000	China	3–0	Australia	Shanghai, China
	Liu Ailing 30'; Sun Wen 77'; Jin Yan 85'	(Report)

17 August 2000	China	0–0	Australia	Shanghai, China
		(Report)

11 January 2001	Australia	2–1	France	Coffs Harbour, Australia
	Rvell 45'; Salisbury 49'	(Report)	Lattaf 66'	Stadium: Coffs Harbour International Stadium; Attendance: 5,118

14 January 2001	Australia	1–1	France	Lismore, Australia
	Rvell 80'	(Report)	Mugneret-Beghe 88'	Stadium: Oakes Oval

17 January 2001	Australia	1–0	France	Lismore, Australia
	Mann 52'	(Report)	Mugneret-Beghe 88'	Stadium: Oakes Oval; Attendance: 2,350

==== Olympic Games ====
13 September 2000 Group stage	Australia	0–3	Germany	Canberra, Australia
17:00		Report	Grings 39'; Wiegmann 70'; Lingor 90+'	Stadium: Bruce Stadium; Attendance: 24,800; Referee: Bola Abidoye (Nigeria)

16 September 2000 Group stage	Australia	1–1	Sweden	Sydney, Australia
17:00	Salisbury 57'	Report	Andersson 66' (pen.)	Stadium: Sydney Football Stadium; Attendance: 33,600; Referee: Sonia Denoncourt (Canada)

19 September 2000 Group stage	Australia	1–2	Brazil	Sydney, Australia
17:30	Hughes 33'	Report	Raquel 56'; Kátia 64'	Stadium: Sydney Football Stadium; Attendance: 29,400; Referee: Vibeke Karlsen (Norway)

== Men's soccer ==
=== National Soccer League ===
==== League table ====
Pos	Team	Pld	W	D	L	GF	GA	GD	Pts	Qualification
1	South Melbourne	30	21	6	3	70	24	+46	69	Qualification for the Finals series
2	Wollongong Wolves (C)	30	18	7	5	80	40	+40	61	Qualification for the Finals series
3	Perth Glory	30	18	7	5	73	33	+40	61	Qualification for the Finals series
4	Sydney Olympic	30	17	6	7	58	37	+21	57	Qualification for the Finals series
5	Marconi Fairfield	30	14	8	8	42	33	+9	50	Qualification for the Finals series
6	Melbourne Knights	30	14	7	9	61	46	+15	49	Qualification for the Finals series
7	Adelaide Force	30	12	7	11	54	54	0	43	
8	Football Kingz	30	12	7	11	52	52	0	43	
9	Parramatta Power	30	13	3	14	42	44	−2	42	
10	Sydney United	30	12	6	12	46	56	−10	42	
11	Canberra Cosmos	30	11	4	15	49	55	−6	37	
12	Brisbane Strikers	30	9	8	13	52	56	−4	35	
13	Northern Spirit	30	8	8	14	39	50	−11	32	
14	Newcastle United	30	7	9	14	37	56	−19	30	
15	Eastern Pride	30	5	5	20	32	61	−29	0 (Note: Eastern Pride were stripped of all their points following a breach of regulations.)	
16	Carlton	30	0	0	30	0	90	−90	0 (Note: Carlton withdrew after eight rounds. All games against them were awarded 3–0.)	Withdrew

Source: rsssf.com
Rules for classification: 1) Points; 2) Goal difference; 3) Goals scored
(C) Champions

=== Finals series ===
==== Bracket ====
Elimination Finals
6	Melbourne Knights (a)	0	2	2
3	Perth Glory	0	2	2
4	Sydney Olympic	3	2	5
5	Marconi Fairfield	1	0	1

Major/Minor semi-finals
2	Wollongong Wolves	2	2	4
1	South Melbourne	1	1	2
6	Melbourne Knights	0
4	Sydney Olympic	1

Preliminary Final
1	South Melbourne	2
4	Sydney Olympic	0

Grand Final
3 June 2001
Wollongong Wolves	2
South Melbourne	1

==== Elimination finals ====
- Melbourne Knights 0–0 : 2–2 Perth Glory
- Sydney Olympic 3–1 : 2–0 Marconi Fairfield

==== Minor semi-final ====
- Melbourne Knights 0–1 Sydney Olympic

==== Major semi-final ====
- Wollongong Wolves 2–1 : 2–1 South Melbourne

==== Preliminary final ====
- South Melbourne 2–0 Sydney Olympic

==== Grand final ====
3 June 2001
12:00 AEST

Wollongong Wolves	2–1	South Melbourne
Petrovski 56'; Young 57'	(report)	Anastasiadis 78'

Parramatta Stadium, Sydney
Attendance: 13,402
Referee: Eddie Lennie

WOLLONGONG WOLVES:
GK	26	(Australia) Dean Anastasiadis
DF	2	(Australia) George Sounis
DF	3	(Australia) Alvin Ceccoli	(yellow card) 79'
DF	5	(Australia) David Cervinski
MF	6	(Australia) Matt Horsley (c)
MF	7	(Australia) Paul Reid
FW	9	(Australia) Sasho Petrovski	(substituted off) 73'
FW	10	(England) Stuart Young
MF	15	(Australia) David Huxley
DF	17	(Australia) Ben Blake
MF	27	(Australia) Robbie Middleby	(substituted off) 90+1'
Substitutes:
GK	1	(Australia) Daniel Beltrame
DF	4	(Australia) Robert Stanton	(substituted on) 73'
MF	8	(England) Max Nicholson
FW	14	(Australia) Jay Lucas
MF	23	(Australia) Dino Mennillo	(substituted on) 90+1'
Manager:
(Australia) Ron Corry
Joe Marston Medal:
(Australia) Matt Horsley

SOUTH MELBOURNE:
GK	1	(Australia) Michael Petkovic
MF	2	(Australia) Steve Iosifidis		(yellow card) 36'		(substituted off) 71'
DF	3	(Australia) Fausto De Amicis	(c)		(yellow card) 89'
DF	4	(Australia) Mehmet Durakovic
MF	7	(Australia) Steve Panopoulos
FW	8	(New Zealand) Vaughan Coveny
MF	10	(Australia) Con Boutsianis
FW	13	(Australia) Andrew Vlahos
FW	14	(Australia) Vas Kalogeracos		(substituted off) 65'
DF	16	(Australia) Zeljko Susa		(substituted off) 65'
DF	25	(Australia) Simon Colosimo
Substitutes:
GK	20	(Australia) Chris Jones
MF	6	(Australia) David Clarkson
FW	9	(Australia) Paul Trimboli		(substituted on) 65'
FW	11	(Australia) John Anastasiadis		(substituted on) 71'
MF	15	(Australia) Goran Lozanovski		(substituted on) 65'
Manager:
(Australia) Mike Petersen
