= 2001 FIFA Confederations Cup Group A =

Football tournament group stage

Group A of the 2001 FIFA Confederations Cup took place between 30 May and 3 June 2001. France won the group, and advanced to the knockout stage, along with group runners-up Australia. Co-hosts South Korea and Mexico failed to advance.

== Standings ==
| Team | Pld | W | D | L | GF | GA | GD | Pts |
|---|---|---|---|---|---|---|---|---|
| France | 3 | 2 | 0 | 1 | 9 | 1 | +8 | 6 |
| Australia | 3 | 2 | 0 | 1 | 3 | 1 | +2 | 6 |
| South Korea | 3 | 2 | 0 | 1 | 3 | 6 | −3 | 6 |
| Mexico | 3 | 0 | 0 | 3 | 1 | 8 | −7 | 0 |

== Results ==
=== France v South Korea ===
30 May 2001
17:00 KST

| France | 5–0 | South Korea |
|---|---|---|
| Marlet 9'; Vieira 19'; Anelka 34'; Djorkaeff 80'; Wiltord 90' | Report |

Daegu World Cup Stadium, Daegu
Attendance: 61,500
Referee: Gamal Al-Ghandour (Egypt)

| France | South Korea |

| GK | 1 | Ulrich Ramé |
| DF | 2 | Willy Sagnol |
| DF | 3 | Bixente Lizarazu |
| DF | 8 | Marcel Desailly |
| DF | 13 | Mikaël Silvestre |
| MF | 4 | Patrick Vieira |
| MF | 7 | Robert Pires | (substituted off) 83' |
| MF | 10 | Eric Carrière |
| FW | 9 | Nicolas Anelka |
| FW | 17 | Steve Marlet | (substituted off) 67' |
| FW | 21 | Christophe Dugarry | (substituted off) 73' |
Substitutions:
| FW | 11 | Sylvain Wiltord | (substituted on) 46' |
| FW | 6 | Youri Djorkaeff | (substituted on) 58' |
| MF | 16 | Olivier Dacourt | (substituted on) 72' |
Manager:
Roger Lemerre

| GK | 1 | Lee Woon-jae |
| DF | 7 | Kim Tae-young | (substituted off) 76' |
| DF | 15 | Lee Min-sung |
| DF | 19 | Lee Young-pyo | (substituted off) 46' |
| DF | 20 | Hong Myung-bo |
| MF | 3 | Choi Sung-yong |
| MF | 4 | Song Chong-gug |
| MF | 6 | Yoo Sang-chul |
| MF | 21 | Park Ji-sung |
| MF | 22 | Ko Jong-soo | (substituted off) 71' |
| FW | 11 | Seol Ki-hyeon |
Substitutions:
| FW | 18 | Hwang Sun-hong | (substituted on) 46' |
| FW | 16 | An Hyo-yeon | (substituted on) 71' |
| MF | 17 | Ha Seok-ju | (substituted on) 76' |
Manager:
(Netherlands) Guus Hiddink

=== Mexico v Australia ===
30 May 2001
19:30 KST

| Mexico | 0–2 | Australia |
|---|---|---|
| | Report | Murphy 20'; Skoko 54' |

Suwon World Cup Stadium, Suwon
Attendance: 6,232
Referee: Felix Tangawarima (Zimbabwe)

| Mexico | Australia |

| GK | 1 | Oswaldo Sánchez |
| DF | 2 | Claudio Suárez |
| DF | 4 | David Oteo |
| DF | 5 | Duilio Davino |
| MF | 6 | Marco Antonio Ruiz | (yellow card) 45+2' | (substituted off) 46' |
| MF | 8 | Juan Pablo Rodríguez | (yellow card) 45' |
| MF | 13 | Pável Pardo |
| MF | 16 | Alberto Coyote | | (substituted off) 46' |
| MF | 20 | Víctor Ruiz | | (substituted off) 66' |
| FW | 9 | José Manuel Abundis |
| FW | 10 | Jared Borgetti |
Substitutions:
| FW | 11 | Daniel Osorno | (yellow card) 74' | (substituted on) 46' |
| MF | 18 | Cesáreo Victorino | | (substituted on) 46' |
| MF | 19 | Joaquín Reyes | | (substituted on) 66' |
Manager:
Enrique Meza

| GK | 1 | Mark Schwarzer |
| DF | 2 | Kevin Muscat |
| DF | 5 | Tony Vidmar |
| DF | 6 | Tony Popovic |
| DF | 14 | Shaun Murphy |
| MF | 4 | Paul Okon | (yellow card) 40' |
| MF | 7 | Josip Skoko | | (substituted off) 70' |
| MF | 8 | Stan Lazaridis | (yellow card) 77' | (substituted off) 79' |
| MF | 17 | Steve Corica |
| FW | 11 | David Zdrilic | | (substituted off) 66' |
| FW | 20 | Clayton Zane |
Substitutions:
| DF | 18 | Scott Chipperfield | | (substituted on) 66' |
| DF | 15 | Hayden Foxe | | (substituted on) 70' |
| FW | 21 | Archie Thompson | | (substituted on) 79' |
Manager:
Frank Farina

=== Australia v France ===
1 June 2001
17:00 KST

| Australia | 1–0 | France |
|---|---|---|
| Zane 60' | Report |

Daegu World Cup Stadium, Daegu
Attendance: 44,400
Referee: Carlos Batres (Guatemala)

| Australia | France |

| GK | 1 | Mark Schwarzer |
| DF | 2 | Kevin Muscat |
| DF | 3 | Craig Moore |
| DF | 5 | Tony Vidmar |
| DF | 6 | Tony Popovic |
| MF | 4 | Paul Okon |
| MF | 7 | Josip Skoko | | (substituted off) 79' |
| MF | 8 | Stan Lazaridis | (yellow card) 81' |
| MF | 17 | Steve Corica |
| FW | 10 | Brett Emerton |
| FW | 20 | Clayton Zane | | (substituted off) 88' |
Substitutions:
| MF | 13 | Mark Bresciano | | (substituted on) 79' |
| FW | 9 | John Aloisi | (yellow card) 90' | (substituted on) 88' |
Manager:
Frank Farina

| GK | 12 | Grégory Coupet |
| DF | 5 | Nicolas Gillet |
| DF | 18 | Frank Leboeuf | (yellow card) 59' (yellow-red card) 78' |
| DF | 19 | Christian Karembeu |
| DF | 20 | Zoumana Camara |
| MF | 15 | Jérémie Bréchet |
| MF | 16 | Olivier Dacourt | | (substituted off) 79' |
| MF | 22 | Laurent Robert |
| FW | 6 | Youri Djorkaeff | | (substituted off) 88' |
| FW | 11 | Sylvain Wiltord |
| FW | 14 | Frédéric Née | | (substituted off) 71' |
Substitutions:
| FW | 9 | Nicolas Anelka | | (substituted on) 71' |
| MF | 7 | Robert Pires | (yellow card) 90+1' | (substituted on) 79' |
| MF | 4 | Patrick Vieira | | (substituted on) 88' |
Manager:
Roger Lemerre

=== South Korea v Mexico ===
1 June 2001
19:30 KST

| South Korea | 2–1 | Mexico |
|---|---|---|
| Hwang Sun-hong 56'; Yoo Sang-chul 90' | Report | Víctor Ruiz 81' |

Ulsan Munsu Football Stadium, Ulsan
Attendance: 41,550
Referee: Hugh Dallas (Scotland)

| South Korea | Mexico |

| GK | 1 | Lee Woon-jae |
| DF | 2 | Kang Chul |
| DF | 3 | Choi Sung-yong |
| DF | 7 | Kim Tae-young |
| DF | 20 | Hong Myung-bo |
| MF | 4 | Song Chong-gug |
| MF | 6 | Yoo Sang-chul |
| MF | 21 | Park Ji-sung |
| MF | 22 | Ko Jong-soo | (yellow card) 67' | (substituted off) 69' |
| FW | 9 | Kim Do-hoon |
| FW | 18 | Hwang Sun-hong | | (substituted off) 78' |
Substitutions:
| DF | 19 | Lee Young-pyo | | (substituted on) 69' |
| FW | 11 | Seol Ki-hyeon | | (substituted on) 78' |
Manager:
(Netherlands) Guus Hiddink

| GK | 1 | Oswaldo Sánchez |
| DF | 2 | Claudio Suárez |
| DF | 5 | Duilio Davino | (yellow card) 72' |
| DF | 17 | Octavio Valdez |
| MF | 7 | David Rangel |
| MF | 8 | Juan Pablo Rodríguez | | (substituted off) 60' |
| MF | 13 | Pável Pardo |
| MF | 18 | Cesáreo Victorino |
| FW | 10 | Jared Borgetti | | (substituted off) 52' |
| FW | 11 | Daniel Osorno | | (substituted off) 71' |
| FW | 15 | Antonio de Nigris |
Substitutions:
| MF | 6 | Marco Antonio Ruiz | | (substituted on) 52' |
| MF | 20 | Víctor Ruiz | | (substituted on) 60' |
| MF | 9 | José Manuel Abundis | | (substituted on) 71' |
Manager:
Enrique Meza

=== France v Mexico ===
3 June 2001
19:30 KST

| France | 4–0 | Mexico |
|---|---|---|
| Wiltord 9'; Carrière 63', 84'; Pires 72' | Report |

Ulsan Munsu Football Stadium, Ulsan
Attendance: 28,864
Referee: Ali Bujsaim (United Arab Emirates)

| France | Mexico |

| GK | 23 | Mickaël Landreau |
| DF | 2 | Willy Sagnol |
| DF | 3 | Bixente Lizarazu |
| DF | 8 | Marcel Desailly |
| DF | 13 | Mikaël Silvestre |
| MF | 4 | Patrick Vieira |
| MF | 7 | Robert Pires | (substituted off) 85' |
| MF | 10 | Eric Carrière |
| FW | 9 | Nicolas Anelka |
| FW | 11 | Sylvain Wiltord | (substituted off) 77' |
| FW | 17 | Steve Marlet | (substituted off) 64' |
Substitutions:
| MF | 22 | Laurent Robert | (substituted on) 64' |
| FW | 6 | Youri Djorkaeff | (substituted on) 77' |
| MF | 16 | Olivier Dacourt | (substituted on) 85' |
Manager:
Roger Lemerre

| GK | 1 | Oswaldo Sánchez |
| DF | 2 | Claudio Suárez |
| DF | 5 | Duilio Davino |
| DF | 17 | Octavio Valdez | (yellow card) 62' |
| MF | 6 | Marco Antonio Ruiz | | (substituted off) 65' |
| MF | 7 | David Rangel |
| MF | 13 | Pável Pardo |
| MF | 18 | Cesáreo Victorino | | (substituted off) 76' |
| MF | 20 | Víctor Ruiz |
| FW | 9 | José Manuel Abundis |
| FW | 15 | Antonio de Nigris | | (substituted off) 46' |
Substitutions:
| FW | 10 | Jared Borgetti | | (substituted on) 46' |
| MF | 19 | Joaquín Reyes | | (substituted on) 65' |
| MF | 8 | Juan Pablo Rodríguez | | (substituted on) 76' |
Manager:
Enrique Meza

=== South Korea v Australia ===
3 June 2001
19:30 KST

| South Korea | 1–0 | Australia |
|---|---|---|
| Hwang Sun-hong 24' | Report |

Suwon World Cup Stadium, Suwon
Attendance: 42,754
Referee: Óscar Ruiz (Colombia)

| South Korea | Australia |

| GK | 1 | Lee Woon-jae |
| DF | 15 | Lee Min-sung |
| DF | 7 | Kim Tae-young |
| DF | 19 | Lee Young-pyo |
| DF | 20 | Hong Myung-bo |
| MF | 3 | Choi Sung-yong |
| MF | 4 | Song Chong-gug |
| MF | 11 | Seol Ki-hyeon |
| MF | 21 | Park Ji-sung |
| FW | 9 | Kim Do-hoon | | (substituted off) 64' |
| FW | 18 | Hwang Sun-hong | (yellow card) 90+2' |
Substitutions:
| FW | 10 | Choi Yong-soo | | (substituted on) 64' |
Manager:
(Netherlands) Guus Hiddink

| GK | 1 | Mark Schwarzer |
| DF | 2 | Kevin Muscat |
| DF | 3 | Craig Moore |
| DF | 5 | Tony Vidmar | (yellow card) 55' |
| DF | 14 | Shaun Murphy |
| DF | 15 | Hayden Foxe | | (substituted off) 46' |
| MF | 4 | Paul Okon | | (substituted off) 82' |
| MF | 13 | Mark Bresciano | (yellow card) 61' |
| MF | 17 | Steve Corica | | (substituted off) 46' |
| FW | 10 | Brett Emerton |
| FW | 20 | Clayton Zane | (yellow card) 49' (yellow-red card) 85' |
Substitutions:
| FW | 11 | David Zdrilic | | (substituted on) 46' |
| DF | 18 | Scott Chipperfield | | (substituted on) 46' |
| MF | 19 | Aurelio Vidmar | | (substituted on) 82' |
Manager:
Frank Farina
