= Carl Fletcher =

Carl Fletcher may refer to:

- Carl Fletcher (Welsh footballer) (born 1980), Welsh former footballer and manager
- Carl Fletcher (Canadian soccer) (born 1971), former professional Canadian soccer defender

== See also ==
- Karl Fletcher, fictional character in TV series Dream Team
