= Gamal Al-Ghandour =

Egyptian football referee (born 1957)

Gamal El-Ghandour
- Full name: Gamal Mahmoud Ahmed El-Ghandour
- Born: June 12, 1957 (age 69); Egypt

International
Years	League	Role
1990s–2002	FIFA-listed	Referee

Gamal Mahmoud Ahmed El-Ghandour (Arabic: جمال محمود الغندور; born June 12, 1957) is a retired Egyptian referee.

== Details ==
El-Ghandour has refereed the 2002 African Cup of Nations final (Cameroon vs Senegal), the second leg of the 2002 African Cup Winners' Cup final (Kotoko (Gha) 2:1 WAC (Mar)), and five successive African Cup of Nations, 1994, 1996, 1998, 2000, and 2002. He is the first African referee to run a match in the UEFA European Football Championship. He has also participated in one Olympic Games, one FIFA Confederation Cup (2001), and one AFC Asian Cup.

He also refereed 1996 Asian Cup. In the semi-final match between Iran and Saudi Arabia and he controversially disallowed one Iranian goal and did not announce a clear penalty for Iran; he also refereed in two FIFA World Cups, France 1998 and Korea/Japan 2002. In the South Korea vs. Spain match in the 2002 World Cup, he controversially disallowed two Spanish goals and his linesmen—one Ugandan, the other Trinidadian—judged one Spanish attack after another to be offside.

He is also the first Egyptian referee to play as a professional referee (Japanese League 1999).

== Selected matches ==
=== FIFA World Cup ===
1998 FIFA World Cup - France
Date	Match	Venue	Round
17 June 1998	Chile 1–1 Austria	Saint-Étienne	Group stage
25 June 1998	Yugoslavia 1–0 United States	Nantes	Group stage
3 July 1998	Brazil 3–2 Denmark	Nantes	Quarter-finals

2002 FIFA World Cup - Korea/Japan
Date	Match	Venue	Round
7 June 2002	Spain 3–1 Paraguay	Jeonju	Group stage
13 June 2002	Brazil 5–2 Costa Rica	Suwon	Group stage
22 June 2002	South Korea 0–0 (5–3 pen.) Spain	Gwangju	Quarter-finals

=== Summer Olympics ===
1996 Summer Olympics - United States
Date	Match	Venue	Round
21 July 1996	Sweden 0–2 China	Miami	Women's group stage
23 July 1996	Brazil 3–1 Hungary	Miami	Men's group stage
27 July 1996	Argentina 4–0 Spain	Birmingham	Men's quarter-finals
2 August 1996	Brazil 5–0 Portugal	Athens	Men's bronze medal match

=== FIFA Confederations Cup ===
2001 FIFA Confederations Cup - Korea/Japan
Date	Match	Venue	Round
30 May 2001	France 5–0 South Korea	Daegu	Group stage
7 June 2001	France 2–1 Brazil	Suwon	FIFA Confederations Cup

=== Africa Cup of Nations ===
1996 African Cup of Nations - South Africa
Date	Match	Venue	Round
16 January 1996	Gabon 1–2 Liberia	Durban	Group stage
21 January 1996	Ivory Coast 1–0 Mozambique	Port Elizabeth	Group stage
31 January 1996	Ghana 0–3 South Africa	Johannesburg	Semi-finals

1998 African Cup of Nations - Burkina Faso
Date	Match	Venue	Round
7 February 1998	Burkina Faso 0–1 DR Congo	Ouagadougou	Group stage
27 February 1998	Burkina Faso 3–4 Cameroon	Ouagadougou	Third place match

2000 African Cup of Nations - Ghana/Nigeria
Date	Match	Venue	Round
23 January 2000	South Africa 3–1 Gabon	Kumasi	Group stage
31 January 2000	Ghana 0–2 Ivory Coast	Accra	Group stage
10 February 2000	Nigeria 2–0 South Africa	Lagos	Semi-finals

2002 African Cup of Nations - Mali
Date	Match	Venue	Round
25 January 2002	Cameroon 1–0 Ivory Coast	Sikasso	Group stage
30 January 2002	South Africa 3–1 Morocco	Ségou	Group stage
10 February 2002	Cameroon 0–0 (3–2 pen.) Senegal	Bamako	Final

=== AFC Asian Cup ===
1996 AFC Asian Cup - United Arab Emirates
Date	Match	Venue	Round
5 December 1996	Saudi Arabia 6–0 Thailand	Dubai	Group stage
15 December 1996	United Arab Emirates 1–0 Iraq	Abu Dhabi	Quarter-finals
19 December 1996	Saudi Arabia 0-0 (4-3 pen.) Iran	Abu Dhabi	Semi-finals

=== UEFA European Championship ===
UEFA Euro 2000 - Belgium/Netherlands
Date	Match	Venue	Round
13 June 2000	Norway 1–0 Spain	Rotterdam	Group stage
21 June 2000	Czech Republic 2–0 Denmark	Liège	Group stage

=== Arab Games ===
1999 Arab Games - Jordan
Date	Match	Venue	Round
16 August 1999	Jordan 3–0 Qatar	Amman	Group stage
23 August 1999	Lebanon 3–1 Jordan	Amman	Group stage
27 August 1999	Iraq 4–0 Lebanon	Irbid	Group stage
31 August 1999	Jordan 4-4 (1-3 pen.) Iraq	Amman	Final

== Statistics ==
Competition	Number of Matches
World Cup	6
FIFA Confederation Cup	2
Olympic Games	4
European Cup of Nations	2
African Cup of Nations	11
Asian Cup of Nations	3
Asian World Cup Qualifiers	1
European Cup Qualifiers	1
Asian Olympic Qualifiers	1
CONCACAF World Cup Qualifiers	1
African Cup Qualifiers	3
African World Cup Qualifiers	6
African Olympic Qualifiers	1
Pan Arab Games	4
Friendlies	3
