= Olivier Tchatchoua =

Cameroonian footballer

Personal information
- Date of birth: 4 April 1982 (age 44)
- Position: Defender

Senior career*
Years	Team	Apps	(Gls)
2000–2001	Sable FC		
2003–2005	Canon Yaoundé		
2006	Impôts FC		

International career
2001	Cameroon	1	(0)
- * Club domestic league appearances and goals

Olivier Tchatchoua (born 4 April 1982) is a Cameroonian former professional footballer who played as a defender. He was part of the Cameroon national team at the 2001 FIFA Confederations Cup and has one international cap which he won in 2001.
