= Tony Menezes =

Canadian soccer player (born 1974)

Personal information
- Full name: Anthony Santos Menezes
- Date of birth: November 24, 1974 (age 51)
- Place of birth: Mississauga, Ontario, Canada
- Height: 6 ft 1 in (1.85 m)
- Position: Defender

Senior career*
Years	Team	Apps	(Gls)
1996	Madureira		
1997–1998	America		
1999	Bangu		
1999	CRB		
2000–2001	Botafogo		
2001	Botafogo/SP	5	(0)
2002	Gansu Nongken	19	(0)
2003	Nanjing Yoyo	17	(3)
2004	Zhejiang Lucheng	22	(4)
2006	Toronto Lynx	6	(0)
2006	SC Ulbra (RS)		
2006–2007	Mahindra United		
2008–2010	Porto Alegre FC		

International career^{‡}
1998–2003	Canada	27	(0)
2005	Canada Beach Soccer	3	(0)
Medal record
Representing Canada
Men's soccer
CONCACAF Gold Cup
Winner	2000 United States
Third place	2002 United States
- * Club domestic league appearances and goals as of 17:47, 24 February 2007 (UTC) ‡ National team caps and goals as of 22 November 2009

Anthony Santos Menezes (born November 24, 1974) is a retired Canadian professional soccer player, who predominantly played as a defender and represented Canada national football team on 27 occasions between 1998 and 2003.

== Personal life ==
A 6'1, 180 lb (82 kg) defender, Menezes was born in Mississauga, Ontario, Canada. He has a Brazilian mother and Portuguese father. When he was 10, he and his family immigrated to Brazil.

== Club career ==
=== Brazil ===
Menezes began his professional club career at Madureira EC in 1996 and appeared in Campeonato Carioca Série B1. He later moved to another Brazilian team America FC Rio in 1997 and played until 1998.

In 1999, he appeared with two different lower league clubs in Brazil, Bangu Atlético and Clube de Regatas Brasil before his stint in top flight side Botafogo between 2000 and 2001.

He signed with Campeonato Brasileiro Série A outfit Botafogo in Rio de Janeiro and appeared in 6 Campeonato Carioca league matches.

=== China ===
In 2002, he moved to Asia and joined Gansu Tianma F.C., where he appeared in 19 league matches. He then signed with China League One side Nanjing Yoyo and played in 17 league matches, scoring 3 goals. He again signed with a China League One outfit Zhejiang Lucheng in 2004. Menezes played as a defender but scored 4 goals in 22 league matches.

=== Canada ===
On April 19, 2006 he signed with a Canadian club for the first time, joining Toronto Lynx in the USL League Two. He played there for only one season.

In 2006, he returned to Brazil and played for SC Ulbra (RS). He with the club, competed in the Campeonato Brasileiro Série C, but was eliminated in the second stage of the competition.

=== India ===
In November 2006, he signed with the defending champions Mahindra United of Indian National Football League as their third foreign player. He debuted for the Jeepmen at the 2006 Durand Cup tournament in Delhi.

"Mahindra United is the best team in India and I'm proud to be part of the team. There is a professional attitude at this club which governs the functioning right up to the president. Also I found the team to be a tight knit bunch and bound like a family."

— Menezes on joining Mahindra United FC

With Mahindra United, he appeared in two competitive seasons and won the IFA Shield in 2006. In the 2006–07 National Football League season, Mahindra finished 3rd in the league table. He has also represented Mahindra at the 2007 AFC Cup, where they qualified for the knockout stages, finishing 2nd in the Group-E behind Singapore Armed Forces but lost in the QF to Al-Najmeh of Lebanon (4–5 aggregate).

=== Back to Brazil ===
After two years in India, Menezes went back to his homeland Brazil and signed in January 2008 with Porto Alegre FC and played until 2010.

== International career ==
He made his debut for Canada in a May 1998 friendly match against North Macedonia and earned a total of 27 caps, scoring no goals. He has represented Canada in four 2002 FIFA World Cup qualification matches between 2000 and 2001 and was a member of the 2000 CONCACAF Gold Cup title-winning squad. Winning the CONCACAF Gold Cup, is the biggest achievement of his long playing career. He has also represented Canada at the 2001 FIFA Confederations Cup in Japan.

His final international was a January 2003 friendly match against the United States, which ended with a 4-0 defeat.

He later appeared for the Beach soccer national team of Canada and played 3 matches in 2005.

== Honours ==
Mahindra United

- IFA Shield: 2006

Canada

- CONCACAF Gold Cup: 2000; 3rd place, 2002
