= Suwon World Cup Stadium =

Football stadium in Suwon, South Korea

Suwon World Cup Stadium 수원월드컵경기장
- Big Bird Stadium

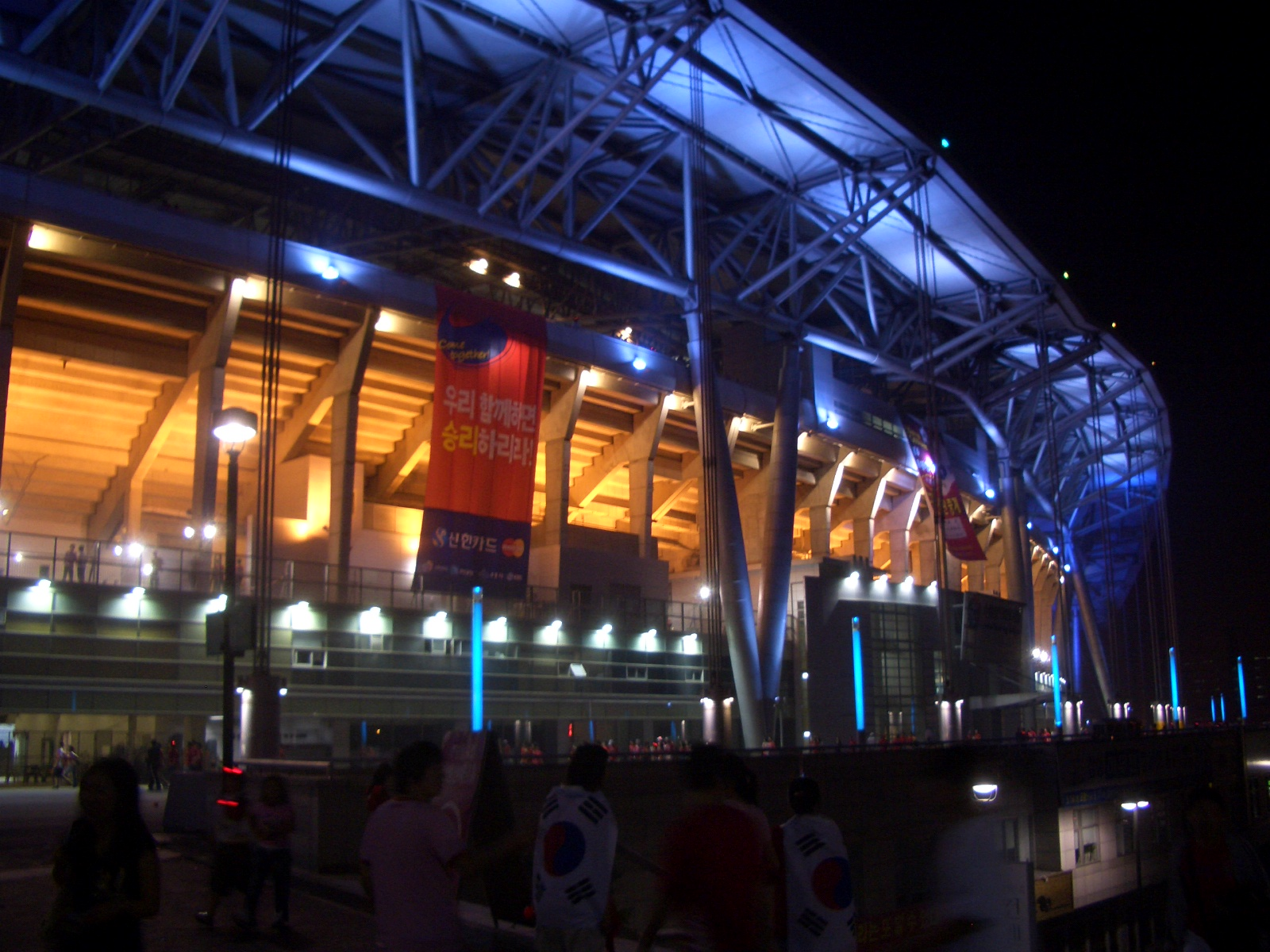
- Exterior of the stadium at night
- Interactive map of Suwon World Cup Stadium 수원월드컵경기장
- Full name: Suwon World Cup Stadium
- Location: 456, Uman-dong, Paldal-gu, Suwon, Gyeonggi-do, South Korea
- Coordinates: 37°17′10.6″N 127°02′12.8″E
- Owner: Gyeonggi Provincial Government & Suwon City Hall
- Operator: Gyeonggi Suwon World Cup Stadium Management Foundation
- Capacity: 44,031
- Surface: Grass
- Field size: 114 by 77 metres (124.7 yd × 84.2 yd)

Construction
- Groundbreaking: 15 November 1996
- Opened: 13 May 2001
- Architect: Samoo Architects & Engineers
- Main contractor: Samsung C&T

Tenants
- Suwon Samsung Bluewings (2001–present): Major sporting events hosted; 2001 FIFA Confederations Cup; 2002 FIFA World Cup; 2017 FIFA U-20 World Cup

The Suwon World Cup Stadium (수원월드컵경기장) is a football stadium located in Suwon, South Korea. It has been home of the K League 1 team Suwon Samsung Bluewings since 2001. The capacity of the stadium is 44,031.

== Notable football events ==
=== 2001 FIFA Confederations Cup ===
Date	Team 1	Result	Team 2	Round
30 May 2001	Mexico	0–2	Australia	First round
3 June 2001	South Korea	1–0	Australia	First round
7 June 2001	France	2–1	Brazil	Semi-final

=== 2002 FIFA World Cup ===
The Suwon World Cup Stadium was one of the venues of the 2002 FIFA World Cup, and held the following matches:

Date	Team 1	Result	Team 2	Round	Attendance
5 June 2002	United States	3–2	Portugal	Group D	37,306
11 June 2002	Senegal	3–3	Uruguay	Group A	33,681
13 June 2002	Costa Rica	2–5	Brazil	Group C	38,524
16 June 2002	Spain	1–1 (a.e.t.) (3–2 pen.)	Republic of Ireland	Round of 16	38,926

== Gallery ==
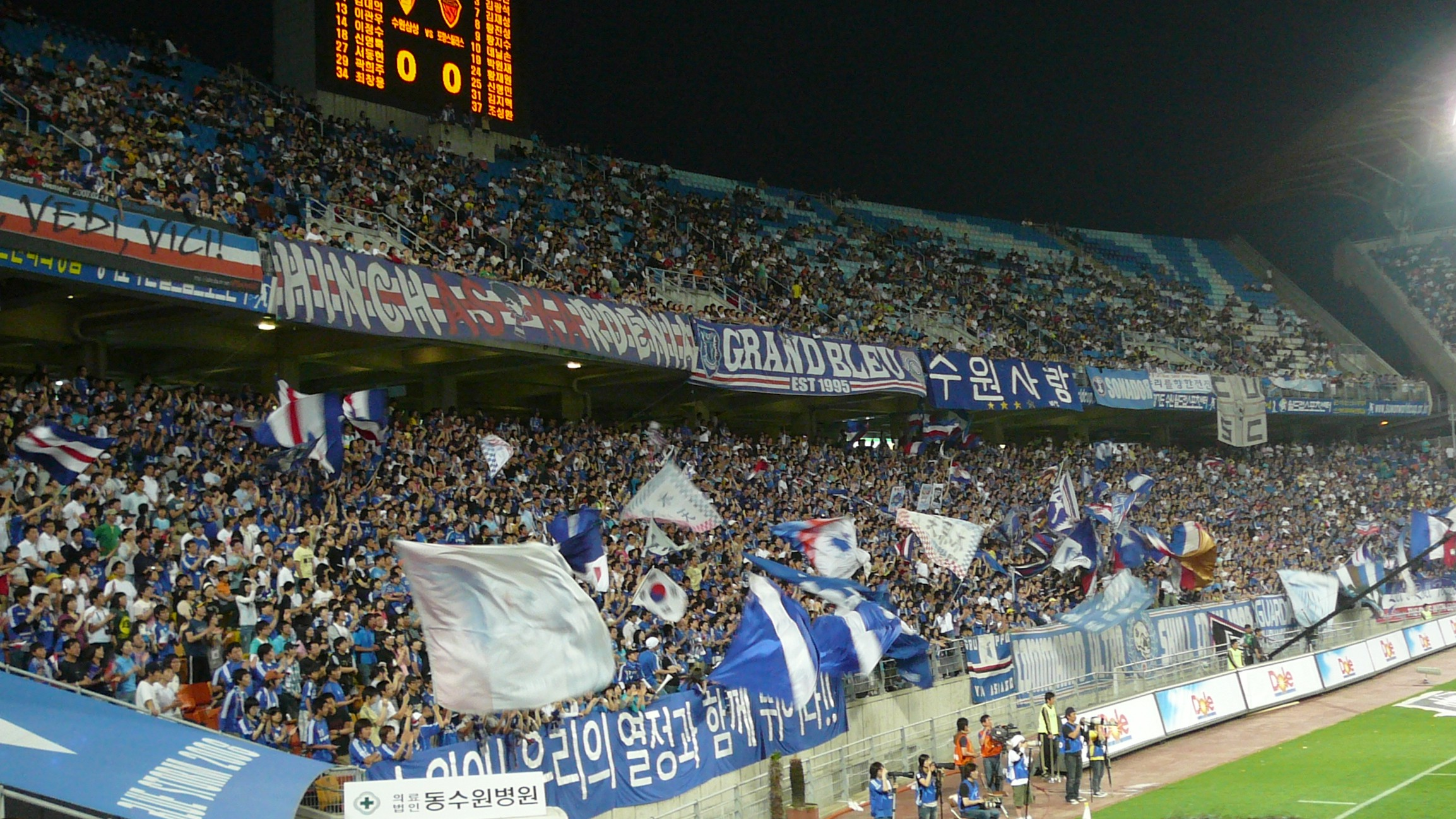
Suwon Bluewings supporters

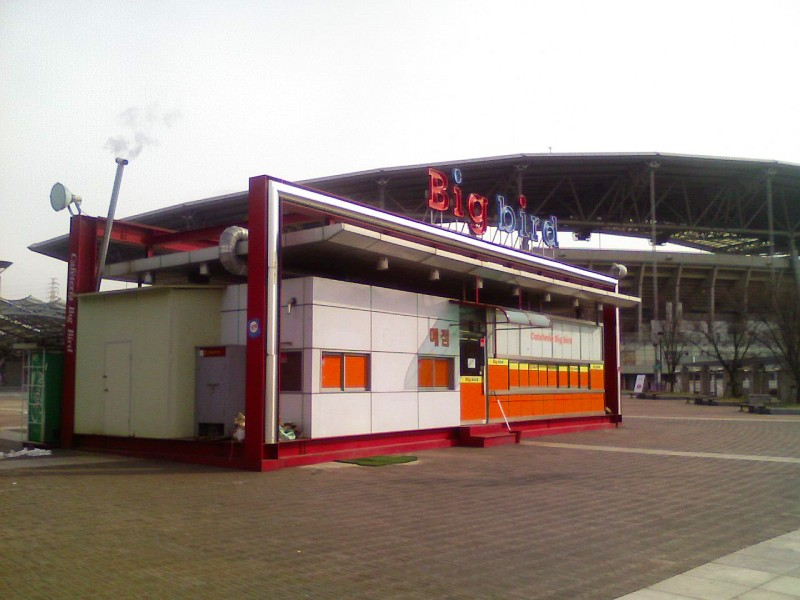
Cafeteria

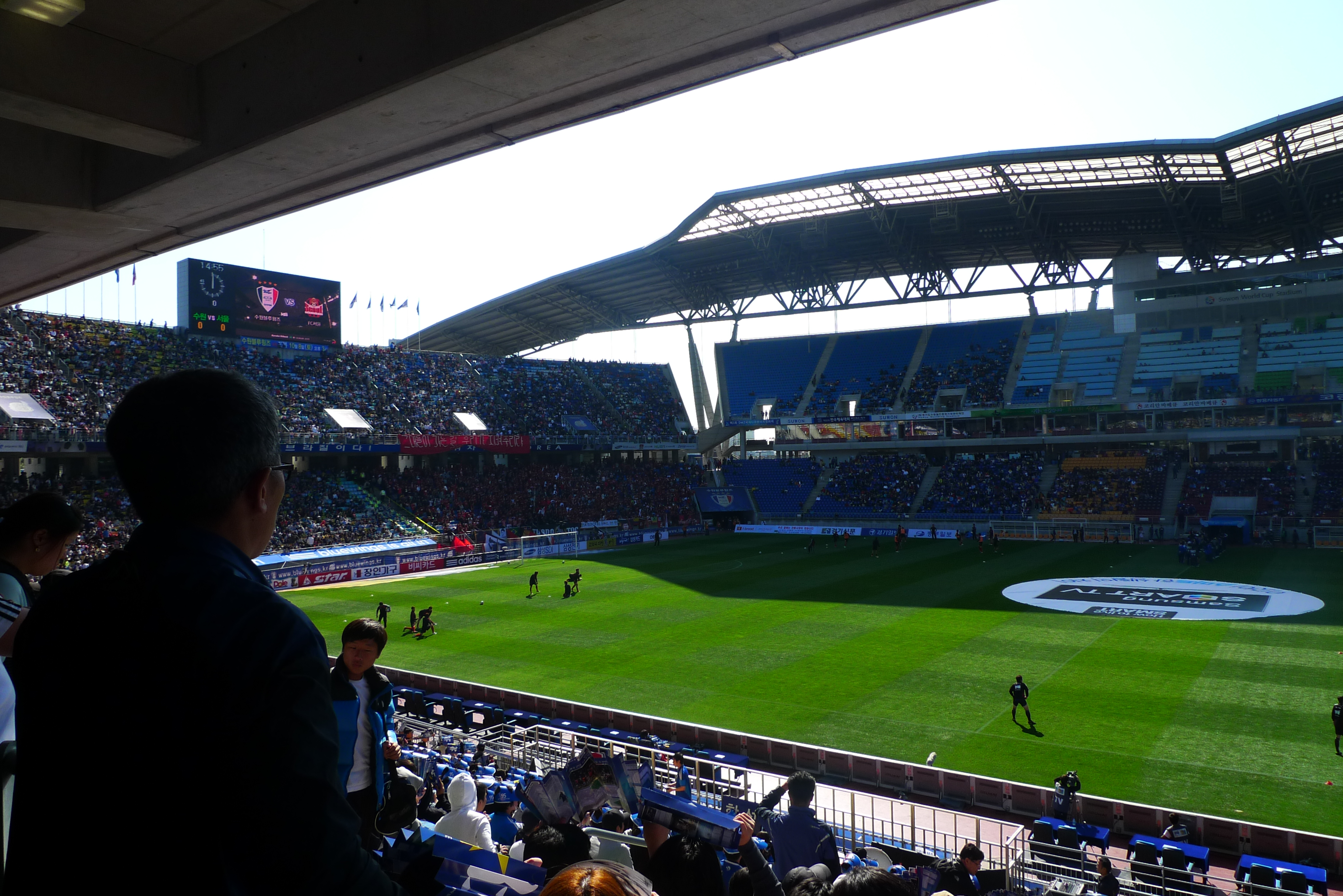
Left side of the stadium

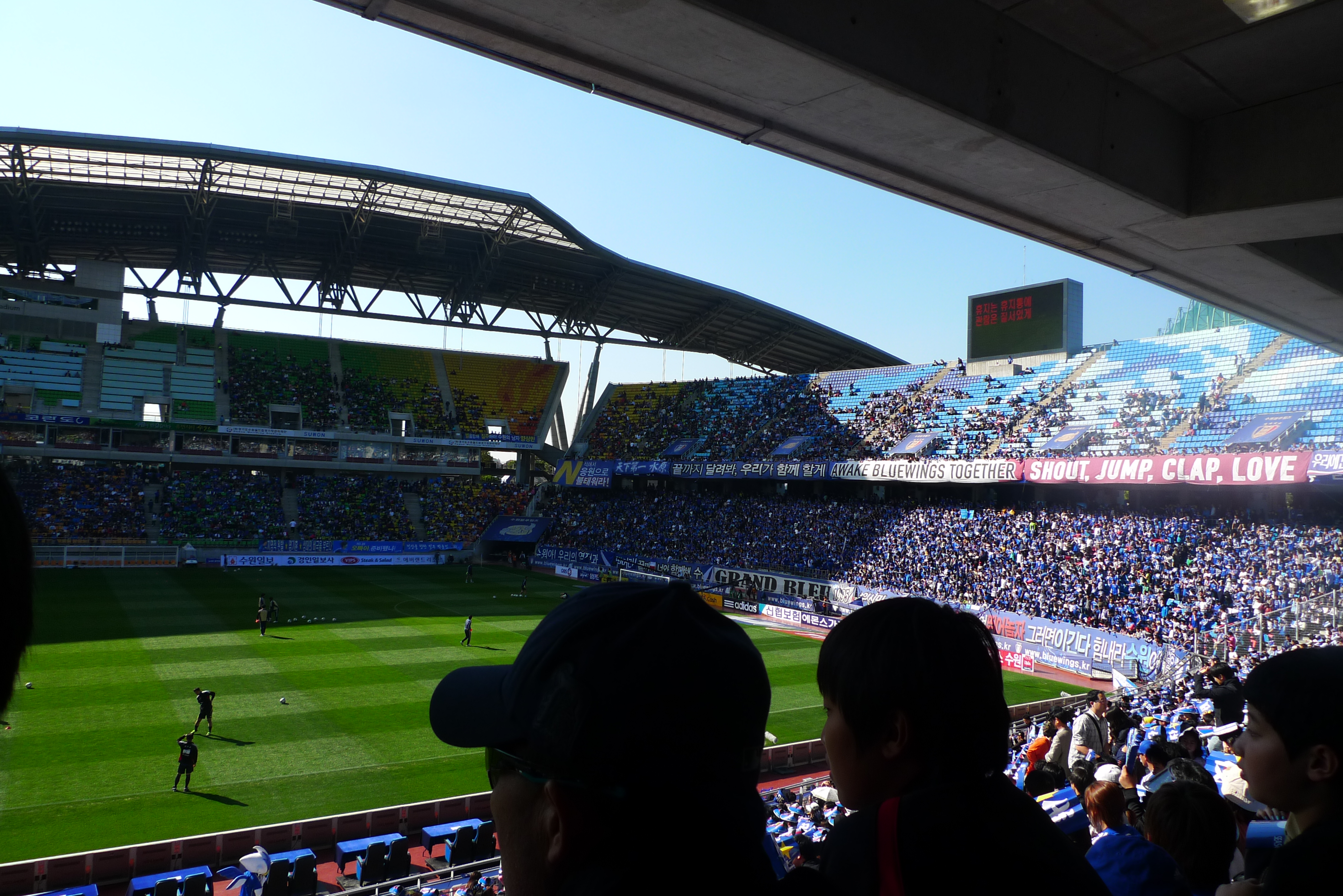
Right side of the stadium

== See also ==
- List of football stadiums in South Korea

Preceded by North Harbour Stadium; Auckland	FIFA U-20 World Cup; Final venue 2017	Succeeded by Stadion Widzewa; Łódź
