= Washington (footballer, born 1 April 1975) =

Brazilian footballer

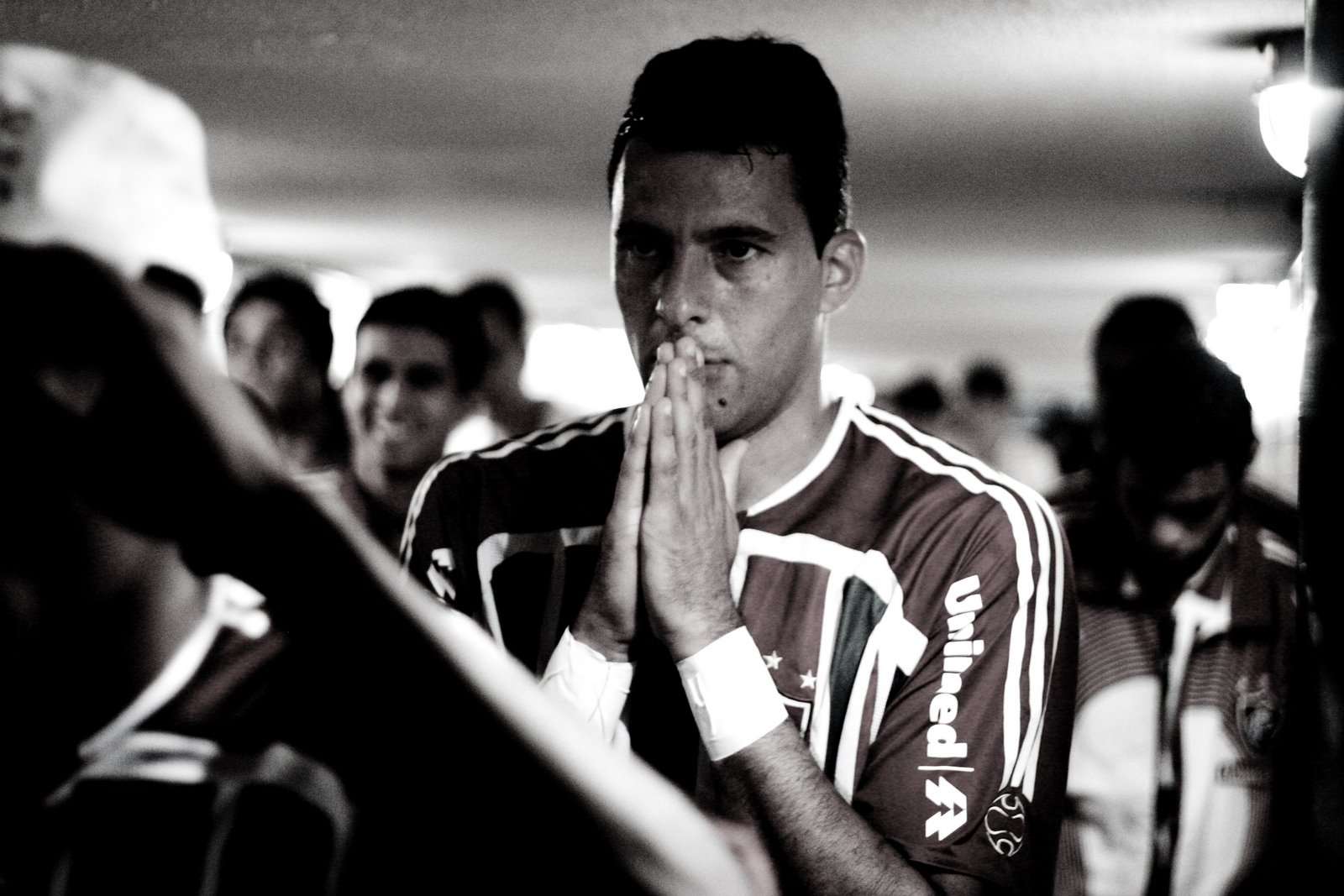

Personal information
- Full name: Washington Stecanela Cerqueira
- Date of birth: 1 April 1975 (age 51)
- Place of birth: Brasília, DF, Brazil
- Height: 1.90 m (6 ft 3 in)
- Position: Striker

Senior career*
Years	Team	Apps	(Gls)
1991–1999	Caxias	28	(35)
1996	→ Internacional (loan)	4	(4)
1997	→ Ponte Preta (loan)	6	(7)
1999–2000	Paraná Clube	20	(10)
2000–2002	Ponte Preta	47	(34)
2002–2003	Fenerbahçe	12	(9)
2004	Atlético Paranaense	38	(34)
2005	Tokyo Verdy	33	(22)
2006–2007	Urawa Reds	52	(42)
2008	Fluminense	28	(21)
2009–2010	São Paulo	39	(19)
2010	Fluminense	26	(8)
Total		300	(200)

International career
2001–2002	Brazil	9	(2)

Managerial career
- 2018: Vitória da Conquista
- 2018: Itabaiana
- * Club domestic league appearances and goals

Washington Stecanela Cerqueira (born 1 April 1975), known as Washington, is a Brazilian football pundit, coach, and former player who played as a striker.

== Career ==
Washington started his senior career from Caxias in 1991, aged 16, playing there for 8 years, until 1999. He then signed for Paraná Clube where he scored 10 goals in 20 matches. After enjoying a fruitful spell with Ponte Preta (2000-02) scoring a record at the time 12 goals on the 2001 Copa do Brasil an interest from European clubs like Greek champions Olympiacos and Fenerbahçe came up. Washington eventually signed with Fenerbahçe in the summer of 2002. During 2001 and 2002 he was also called up to the Brazil national team by Felipe Scolari scoring 2 goals in 9 games and became a candidate for the 2002 World Cup.

In the 2002–03 Turkish league season Washington scored 9 goals in 12 games but was subsequently released by Fenerbahçe because of his health problems.

Washington was submitted to a coronary catheterization. Once recovered, physicians told him that playing football would not represent a risk to his condition. He then signed with Brazilian club Atlético Paranaense where he was 2004 Série A top-scorer with 34 goals and broke the league's record. For his recovery, he was dubbed Coração Valente, the title of the movie Braveheart in Brazil.

In 2005, he moved to Japan to play for Tokyo Verdy in the J1 League. He had a successful season there with 22 goals in 33 games but could not save his club from relegation. In 2006, he transferred to Urawa Red Diamonds and helped the Reds win their first ever J1 League title, becoming the top scorer in the league with 26 goals in 26 games. In 2007, he scored three goals at the FIFA Club World Cup as the Reds finished third.

On 21 December 2007, Washington returned to Brazil to play for Fluminense. His contract was valid through the end of 2008. Washington finished as the 2008 Campeonato Brasileiro Série A top scorer, with 21 goals, tied with Keirrison and Kléber Pereira. Even though he renewed his contract with São Paulo until the end of the 2010 season he eventually returned to Fluminense on July 27, 2010. He played a major role in the team's run to win the 2010 Série A, scoring 10 goals throughout the competition and being involved in the play that guaranteed the team's championship (in the last game of the season).

On 13 January 2011, while training with Fluminense in Mangaratiba, Washington announced his retirement from football.

== Career statistics ==
=== Club ===
Club performance			League		Cup		League Cup		Continental		Total	
Season	Club	League	Apps	Goals	Apps	Goals	Apps	Goals	Apps	Goals	Apps	Goals
Brazil			League		Copa do Brasil		League Cup		South America		Total	
1999	Paraná	Série A	20	10								
2000	Paraná	Série A	0	0								
2000	Ponte Preta	Série A	23	16								
2001	Ponte Preta	Série A	24	18								
2002	Ponte Preta	Série A	0	0								
Turkey			League		Türkiye Kupası		League Cup		Europe		Total	
2002–03	Fenerbahçe	Süper Lig	12	9	0	0	0	0	0	0	12	9
2003–04	Fenerbahçe	Süper Lig	0	0	0	0	0	0	0	0	0	0
Brazil			League		Copa do Brasil		League Cup		South America		Total	
2004	Atlético Paranaense	Série A	38	34								
Japan			League		Emperor's Cup		J.League Cup		Asia		Total	
2005	Tokyo Verdy	J1 League	33	22	1	0	5	5	-		40*	29*
2006	Urawa Reds	J1 League	26	26	2	3	6	9	-		35*	39*
2007	Urawa Reds	J1 League	26	16	0	0	0	0	10	1	40*	20*
Brazil			League		Copa do Brasil		League Cup		South America		Total	
2008	Fluminense	Série A	28	21								
2009	São Paulo	Série A	33	17								
2010	São Paulo	Série A	6	2								
2010	Fluminense	Série A	26	8								
Country	Brazil		198	126								
Country	Turkey		17	10								
Country	Japan		85	64	3	3	11	14	10	1	127*	97*
Total			300	200								

* includes Japanese Super Cup and Club World Cup

=== International ===
Brazil national team
Year	Apps	Goals
2001	6	1
2002	3	1
Total	9	2

=== International goals ===
International appearances and goals
#	Date	Venue	Opponent	Result	Goal	Competition
2001
1.	25 April 2001	São Paulo, Brazil	Peru	1–1	0	2002 FIFA World Cup qualification
	26 May 2001	Tokyo, Japan	(Japan) Tokyo Verdy	2–0	1	Unofficial friendly
2.	31 May 2001	Ibaraki, Japan	Cameroon	2–0	1	2001 FIFA Confederations Cup
3.	2 June 2001	Ibaraki, Japan	Canada	0–0	0	2001 FIFA Confederations Cup
4.	4 June 2001	Ibaraki, Japan	Japan	0–0	0	2001 FIFA Confederations Cup
5.	7 June 2001	Suwon, South Korea	France	1–2	0	2001 FIFA Confederations Cup
6.	9 June 2001	Ulsan, South Korea	Australia	0–1	0	2001 FIFA Confederations Cup
2002
7.	31 January 2002	Goiânia, Brazil	Bolivia	6–0	1	Friendly
8.	6 February 2002	Riyadh, Saudi Arabia	Saudi Arabia	1–0	0	Friendly
9.	7 March 2002	Cuiabá, Brazil	Iceland	6–1	0	Friendly

== Honours ==
=== Club ===
Tokyo Verdy

- Japanese Super Cup: 2005

Urawa Reds

- Japanese Super Cup: 2006
- Emperor's Cup: 2006
- J1 League: 2006
- AFC Champions League: 2007

Fluminense

- Campeonato Brasileiro Série A: 2010

=== Individual ===
- FIFA Club World Cup Top Scorer: 2007
- Brazilian League Top Scorer: 2004, 2008
- São Paulo State Championship Top Scorer: 2001
- Brazilian Cup Top Scorer: 2001
- J.League Top Scorer: 2006
- J.League Best Eleven: 2006
- Troféu Mesa Redonda best player: 2004
