= Fábio Rochemback =

Brazilian footballer (born 1981)

Personal information
- Full name: Fábio Rochemback
- Date of birth: 10 December 1981 (age 44)
- Place of birth: Soledade, Brazil
- Height: 1.81 m (5 ft 11 in)
- Position: Midfielder

Youth career
- Internacional

Senior career*
Years	Team	Apps	(Gls)
1999–2001	Internacional	40	(7)
2001–2003	Barcelona	71	(5)
2003–2005	→ Sporting CP (loan)	46	(10)
2005–2008	Middlesbrough	68	(5)
2008–2009	Sporting CP	20	(1)
2009–2012	Grêmio	69	(3)
2012–2013	Dalian Aerbin	51	(7)
2014	Ipiranga de Passo Fundo		
Total		339	(36)

International career
2004	Brazil U23	6	(0)
2001	Brazil	7	(0)
- * Club domestic league appearances and goals

Fábio Rochemback (born 10 December 1981) is a Brazilian former professional footballer who played as a midfielder.

At different ends of his career, he represented both Grenal rivals of his home state of Rio Grande do Sul: Internacional and Grêmio. He signed for Barcelona at 19 for €15 million but struggled, while he reached the 2005 UEFA Cup Final on loan to Sporting CP. He also spent three years at Middlesbrough of the Premier League, and played in the 2006 UEFA Cup Final for them.

Rochemback played seven games for Brazil, at the 2001 FIFA Confederations Cup and 2001 Copa América.

== Club career ==
=== Barcelona ===
Born in Soledade, Rio Grande do Sul, Rochemback began his career with nearby Sport Club Internacional before transferring to FC Barcelona in July 2001 at the age of 19. The transfer fee was 2.43 billion pesetas in three instalments (€15 million).

Expected to be a replacement for the departure of long-serving captain Pep Guardiola, Rochemback played a more physical game than the latter, with a strong shot. He has been named as one of the worst players in the club's history, having played at one of their worst periods. In two full seasons at the Camp Nou he made 68 total appearances and scored four goals, most memorably a long-distance strike as a substitute in a 3–1 UEFA Champions League win away to Liverpool on 20 November 2001.

==== Loan to Sporting CP ====
In July 2003, Rochemback was loaned to Portugal's Sporting CP for a year, as part of the deal that saw Ricardo Quaresma move in the other direction for €10 million. In his second season in Lisbon, he helped the club to the final of the 2004–05 UEFA Cup, scoring a 30-metre free kick in a 2–1 win at Feyenoord in the second leg of the last 16, and wrapped up a 4–1 win over Newcastle United (4–2 aggregate) in the second part of the quarter-finals. In the final at the club's own Estádio José Alvalade he played the full 90 minutes of a 3–1 loss to PFC CSKA Moscow.

=== Middlesbrough ===
Having caught the eye of Middlesbrough manager Steve McClaren during a UEFA Cup game for Sporting earlier in the year, Rochemback signed a five-year deal with the Teesside club on transfer deadline day of 31 August 2005. The late deal had been jeopardised by financial complications: Sporting were subject to a €1 million payment to Barcelona if Rochemback did not spend three years on loan at the club, so Middlesbrough agreed to pay this fee as well. This transfer is one of those about which the Stevens inquiry report in June 2007 expressed concerns because of the lack of co-operation from agents Pini Zahavi and Barry Silkman.

Rochemback made his league debut in a 2–1 home win over Arsenal on 10 September, and scored his first goal on 11 February 2006 in a 3–0 victory against leaders and reigning champions Chelsea also at the Riverside Stadium. His first FA Cup goal for Middlesbrough came direct from a free kick, in a 4–2 victory over Charlton Athletic in a quarter–final replay on 11 April. He also played an important role in Middlesbrough's run to the 2006 UEFA Cup Final in a 4–1 victory (4–3 on aggregate) against FC Basel in the quarter–final second leg on 6 April, which he was named man of the match.

Rochemback scored a free kick in Middlesbrough's last match of the 2007–08 Premier League an 8–1 win over Manchester City on 11 May 2008.

=== Return to Sporting CP ===
On 13 May 2008, Rochemback was released from Middlesbrough, after they rejected the chance to take up a two-year option on his contract. He signed a three-year deal to return to Sporting on the same day.

=== Grêmio ===
In August 2009, Rochemback signed a two–year contract with Grêmio and acquired 30% economic rights for €928,000. Sporting retained 40% economic rights. (However Sporting later announced it sold 90% rights) In January 2011 he extended his contract to 31 December 2012.

=== Dalian ===
In January 2012, Grêmio directors confirmed the transfer of Rochemback to Chinese Super League club Dalian Aerbin. He left the club in the end of 2013.

=== Return to Brazil ===
Before manager Renato Gaúcho signed with Fluminense for the 2014 season, he recommended the signing of Rochemback, who he coached while at Grêmio. In January 2014, Rochemback was close to sign with Sport in a two-year deal. The club ended the negotiations due to a change in the financial agreement after a first offer was previously agreed.

In June, he joined Passo Fundo amateur club Ipiranga and won the amateur tournament held by the city in 2014.

== International career ==
Rochemback earned seven caps for Brazil, all in competitions in 2001. He made his debut on 31 May in the team's 2001 FIFA Confederations Cup opener against Cameroon, replacing Vágner at half time in a 2–0 win; he played all five games as the team came fourth. Weeks later, he went to the 2001 Copa América in Colombia.

== Personal life ==
In 2011, police found birds used for cockfighting at a building owned by Rochemback in Soledade. In October 2017, he was arrested on further charges of involvement in the blood sport when evidence was found in Palmeira das Missões.

== Honours ==
Sporting CP

- UEFA Cup Runner-up: 2004–05

Middlesbrough

- UEFA Cup Runner-up: 2005–06
