= Roger Lemerre =

French football player and manager (born 1941)

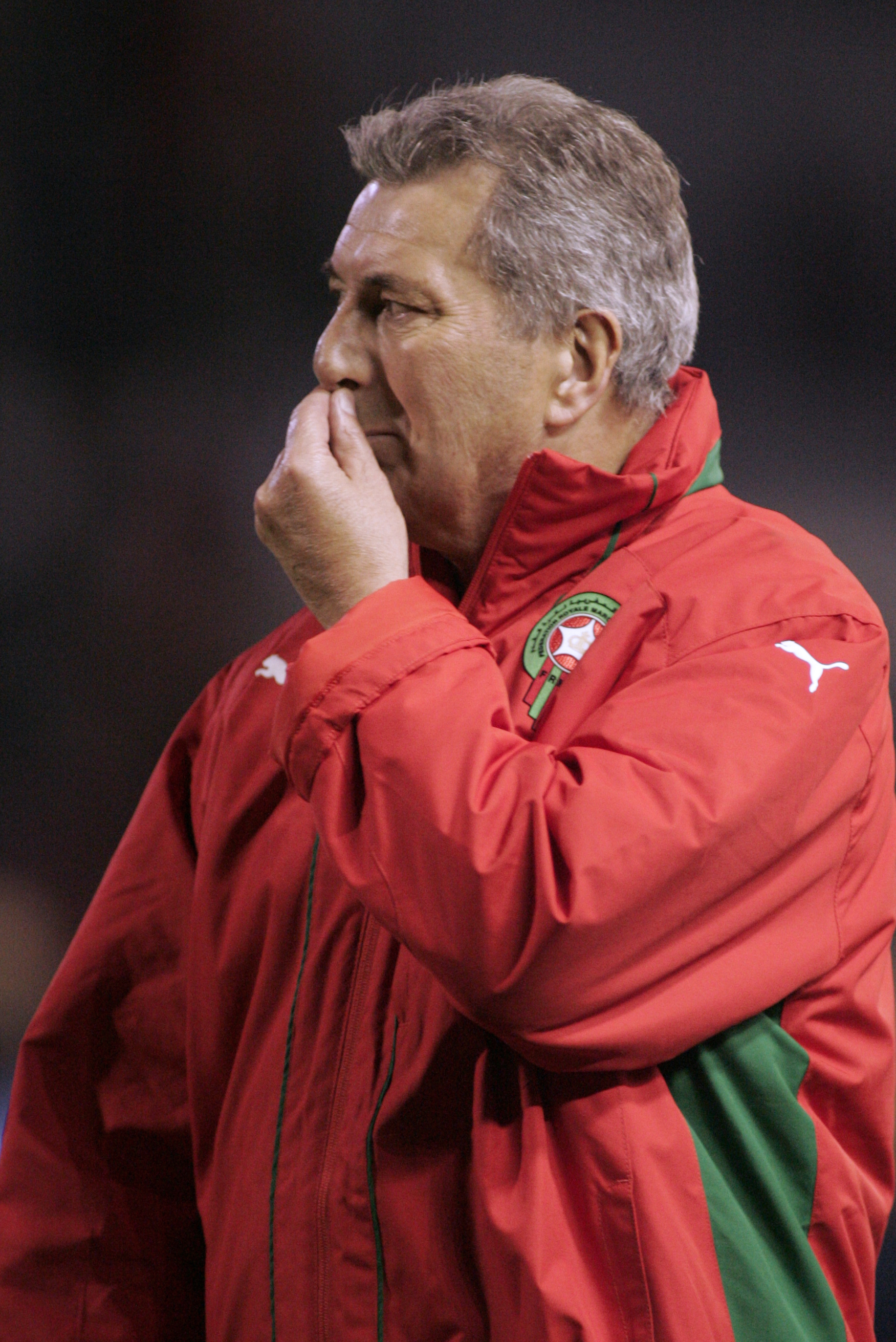
- Lemerre as manager of Morocco in 2009

Personal information
- Full name: Roger Léon Maurice Lemerre-Desprez
- Date of birth: 18 June 1941 (age 85)
- Place of birth: Bricquebec, Manche, France
- Position: Defender

Senior career*
| Years | Team | Apps | (Gls) |
| 1961–1969 | Sedan | 213 | (24) |
| 1969–1971 | Nantes | 69 | (1) |
| 1971–1973 | Nancy | 65 | (0) |
| 1973–1975 | Lens | 57 | (0) |
| Total | | 404 | (25) |

International career
| 1968–1971 | France | 6 | (0) |

Managerial career
- 1975–1978: Red Star
- 1978–1979: Lens
- 1979–1981: Paris
- 1981–1983: Strasbourg
- 1983–1984: Espérance Tunis
- 1985–1986: Red Star
- 1986–1996: France (Army team)
- 1997: Lens
- 1998: France (assistant coach)
- 1998–2002: France
- 2002–2008: Tunisia
- 2008–2009: Morocco
- 2009–2010: Ankaragücü
- 2012–2013: CS Constantine
- 2013–2014: Étoile du Sahel
- 2016: Sedan
- 2018–2019: Étoile du Sahel
- 2021–2022: Étoile du Sahel
Medal record
Men's football
Representing France (as manager)
UEFA European Championship
| Winner | 2000 |
FIFA Confederations Cup
| Winner | 2001 |
Representing Tunisia (as manager)
Africa Cup of Nations
| Winner | 2004 |
- * Club domestic league appearances and goals

Roger Léon Maurice Lemerre-Desprez (French pronunciation: [ʁɔʒe ləmɛʁ depʁe]; born 18 June 1941) is a French former professional football manager and former player. During his managerial career, he was in charge of the French, Tunisian and Moroccan national teams. He also managed numerous clubs in France, Tunisia, Turkey and Algeria.

== Playing career ==
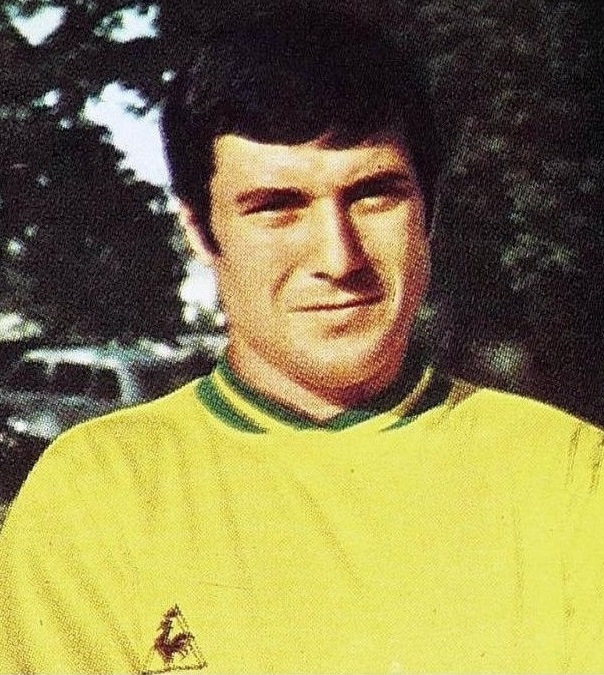
Lemerre in 1970

His professional playing career spanned 15 seasons, from 1961 to 1975: between 1961 and 1969 he played for Sedan and lost the Cup in 1965, before moving to Nantes (1968–1971), Nancy (1971–1973) and Lens (1973–1975). He won six caps for France between 1968 and 1971.

== Managerial career ==
Between 1975 and 1978, he was the coach of Red Star from Saint-Ouen, and then went back to Lens for a season as coach, before moving to Paris for two seasons. In the 1983–1984 season, he ran Espérance Tunis in Tunisia. On his return to France, he again took up his post as Red Star manager.

For ten seasons, he coached the French national military team, with whom he won the 1995 World Military Cup.

In 1997, he finished the season with Lens and saved it from relegation.

He assisted Aimé Jacquet in the French team's 1998 World Cup victory. This paved the way for him to take over as the national coach, winning Euro 2000 in Netherlands and Belgium and FIFA Confederations Cup next year. However, after the team suffered a stunning first-round exit in the 2002 FIFA World Cup, he was sacked by the French Football Federation.

Undeterred, the Tunisian Football Federation soon hired Lemerre to be the manager of their national side. There, he guided them to victory in the African Nations Cup in 2004 making him first coach in football history to win two different continental tournaments i.e. Euro 2000 and AFCON 2004, and led them to qualification for the 2006 FIFA World Cup in Germany. He was sacked in February 2008 following the team's exit from the 2008 African Cup of Nations in the quarter-finals.

Lemerre was named the new head coach of Morocco national team in May 2008 and took charge on 1 July. He was fired on 9 July 2009, for disappointing results. On 18 December 2009, he accepted a managing job at Ankaragücü on a six-month deal that could be extended if both parties agreed. Former Turkey international Ümit Özat was appointed as his assistant coach. In May 2010, despite the fact that Lemerre had turned the team around and possibly saved them from relegation, the club decided not to extend Lemerre's contract and he was replaced by his assistant Ümit Özat for the 2009–10 season.

In December 2013, Lemerre agreed a six-month deal to take a coaching job at Tunisian team Étoile du Sahel.

In January 2016 he became new manager of Sedan.

== Honours ==
=== As manager ===
France

- UEFA European Championship: 2000
- FIFA Confederations Cup: 2001

Tunisia

- African Cup of Nations: 2004

Étoile du Sahel

- Tunisian Cup: 2013–14
- Arab Club Champions Cup: 2018–19

Orders

- Knight of the National Order of Merit: 1998
- Knight of the Legion of Honour: 2001
- Grand Officer of the National Order of Merit of Tunisia: 2004
