= Carl Fletcher (Canadian soccer) =

Canadian soccer player (born 1971)

Personal information
- Full name: Carl Tadeus Fletcher
- Date of birth: 26 December 1971 (age 54)
- Place of birth: Plymouth, Montserrat
- Height: 5 ft 10 in (1.78 m)
- Position: Defender

Youth career
- Scarborough Blues

Senior career*
Years	Team	Apps	(Gls)
1989–1993	Toronto Blizzard	88+	(4+)
1994	Toronto Rockets	20	(0)
1996–1998	Montreal Impact	68	(0)
1999–2000	Hampton Roads Mariners	27	(2)
2001	Montreal Impact	13	(0)
2001	Rochester Rhinos	9	(0)
2002–2004	Atlanta Silverbacks	28	(0)
2005	Toronto Lynx	0	(0)

International career
1991–2003	Canada	40	(2)
Medal record
Representing Canada
Men's soccer
CONCACAF Gold Cup
Winner	2000 United States
Third place	2002 United States
- * Club domestic league appearances and goals

Carl Tadeus Fletcher (born 26 December 1971) is a former professional Canadian soccer defender who played in the Canadian Soccer League, USL A-League, and played at the international level appearing in several CONCACAF Gold Cup tournaments and at the 2001 FIFA Confederations Cup.

== Club career ==
Fletcher began his professional career for the Toronto Blizzard of the Canadian Soccer League. He played for the Toronto Rockets in 1994, which was the club's only season of existence. He spent the 1996 indoor season with Toronto Shooting Stars of the National Professional Soccer League. When the indoor season ended he signed with Montreal Impact and played a total of 68 matches. In 1999, he signed a contract with Hampton Roads Mariners and played two years with the team. Fletcher returned to the Montreal Impact in April 2001. After playing half a season with the Impact, he was sold to Rochester Raging Rhinos in August 2001. With Rochester he reached the postseason, and captured the A-League championship.

In 2002, Fletcher was transferred to the Atlanta Silverbacks, where he spent two seasons, that of 2002 being his best when the team reached the first round of the playoffs. In 2004 Fletcher took a season off to pursue a broadcast career with TSN. A year after he decided to return to soccer and signed with his hometown club the Toronto Lynx. His signing was announced on 31 March 2005. He failed to make an appearance for the club due to sustaining an injury early in the season and was released halfway through the season.

== International career ==
Fletcher made his first steps on the international scene at the 1987 FIFA U-16 World Championship which were held in Canada. He played in all three games there.

He made his senior debut for Canada in a July 1991 CONCACAF Gold Cup match against Jamaica and for a couple of years was the first-choice defender for the Canada national team. He earned 40 caps, scoring twice. He represented Canada in 7 World Cup qualifiers.

His last international game was on 1 June 2003 against Germany.

== Career statistics ==
Scores and results list Canada's goal tally first.

#	Date	Venue	Opponent	Score	Result	Competition
1	16 November 1997	Estadio Nacional, San José, Costa Rica	Costa Rica	2-1	1-3	1998 FIFA World Cup qualification
2	8 October 1999	Los Angeles Memorial Coliseum, Los Angeles, United States	El Salvador	2-1	2-1	CONCACAF Gold Cup playoff

== Honours ==
Canada

- CONCACAF Gold Cup: 2000; 3rd place, 2002
