= Léomar Leiria =

Brazilian footballer (born 1971)

Personal information
- Full name: Léomar Leiria
- Date of birth: 26 June 1971 (age 55)
- Place of birth: Marechal Rondon, Paraná, Brazil
- Height: 1.85 m (6 ft 1 in)
- Position: Defensive midfielder

Senior career*
Years	Team	Apps	(Gls)
1989–1990	Atlético Paranaense		
1991	AA Iguaçu		
1991–1995	Atlético Paranaense	77	(8)
1996–2001	Sport Recife	92	(7)
2002	Jeonbuk Hyundai Motors	4	(0)
2003	Atlético Paranaense	22	(0)
2004	Náutico		
2005	Operário (PR)		
2006	CSA		

International career^{‡}
2001	Brazil	5	(0)
- * Club domestic league appearances and goals as of 30 October 2005 ‡ National team caps and goals as of 8 June 2001

Léomar Leiria (born 26 June 1971, in Marechal Rondon, Paraná) is a retired Brazilian footballer who played as a defensive midfielder.

== Honours ==
Clube Atlético Paranaense

- Campeonato Brasileiro Série B: 1995

Sport Club do Recife

- Campeonato Pernambucano: 1997, 1998, 1999, 2000
- Copa do Nordeste: 2000
