= Ibaraki, Ibaraki =

Ibaraki 茨城町
- Town
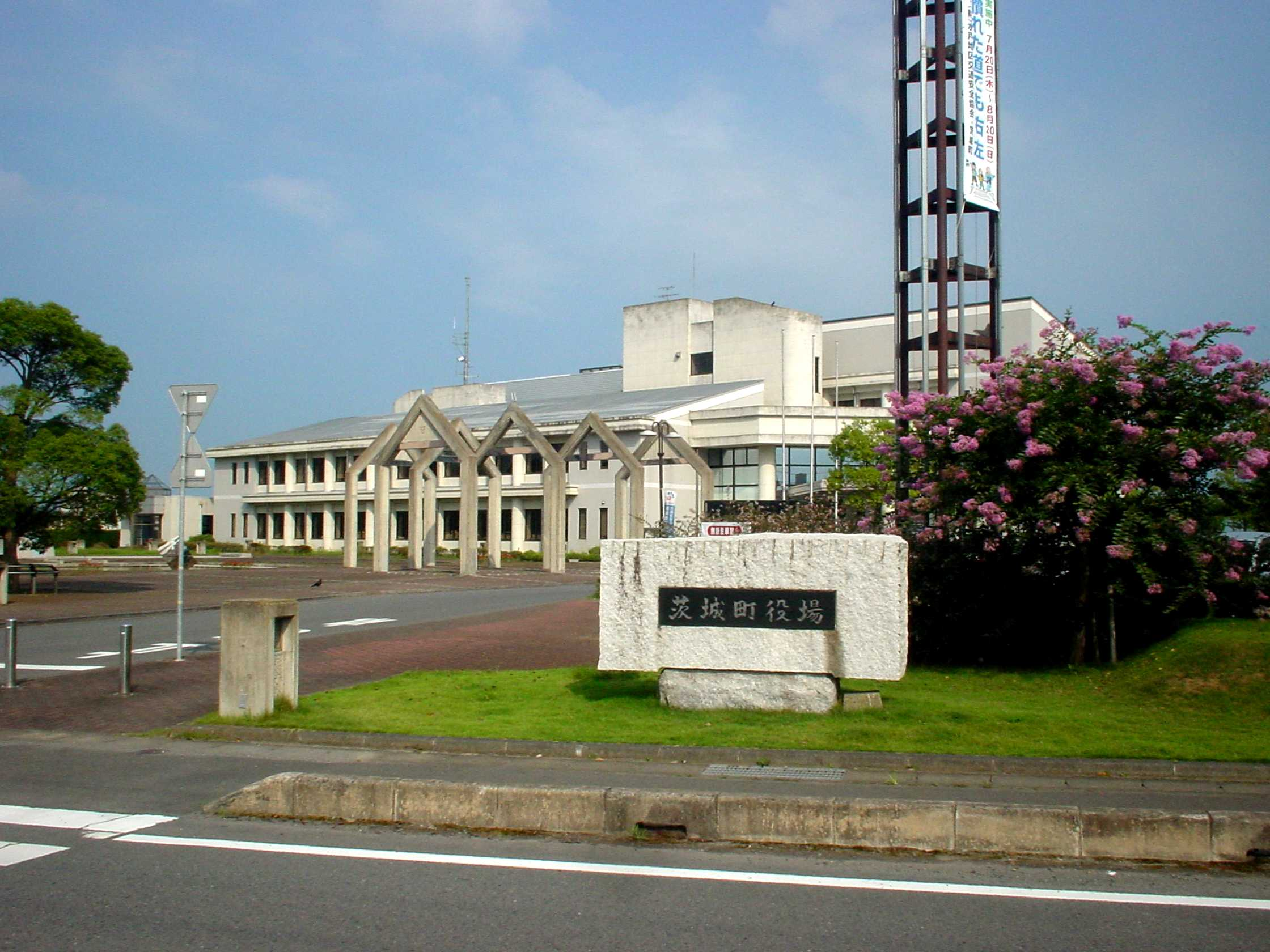
- Ibaraki town office

- Flag Seal

- Location of Ibaraki in Ibaraki Prefecture

- Coordinates: 36°17′12.8″N 140°25′28.3″E
- Country: Japan
- Region: Kantō
- Prefecture: Ibaraki
- District: Higashiibaraki

Area
  - Total: 121.58 km^{2} (46.94 sq mi)

Population (1 September 2020)
  - Total: 31,412
  - Density: 258.36/km^{2} (669.16/sq mi)
- Time zone: UTC+9 (Japan Standard Time)
- Tree: Prunus mume
- Flower: Sakura
- Bird: Japanese bush warbler
- Phone number: 029-292-1111
- Address: 1080 Ozutsumi, Ibaraki-machi, Higashiibaraki-gun, Ibaraki-ken 311-3192
- Website: Official website

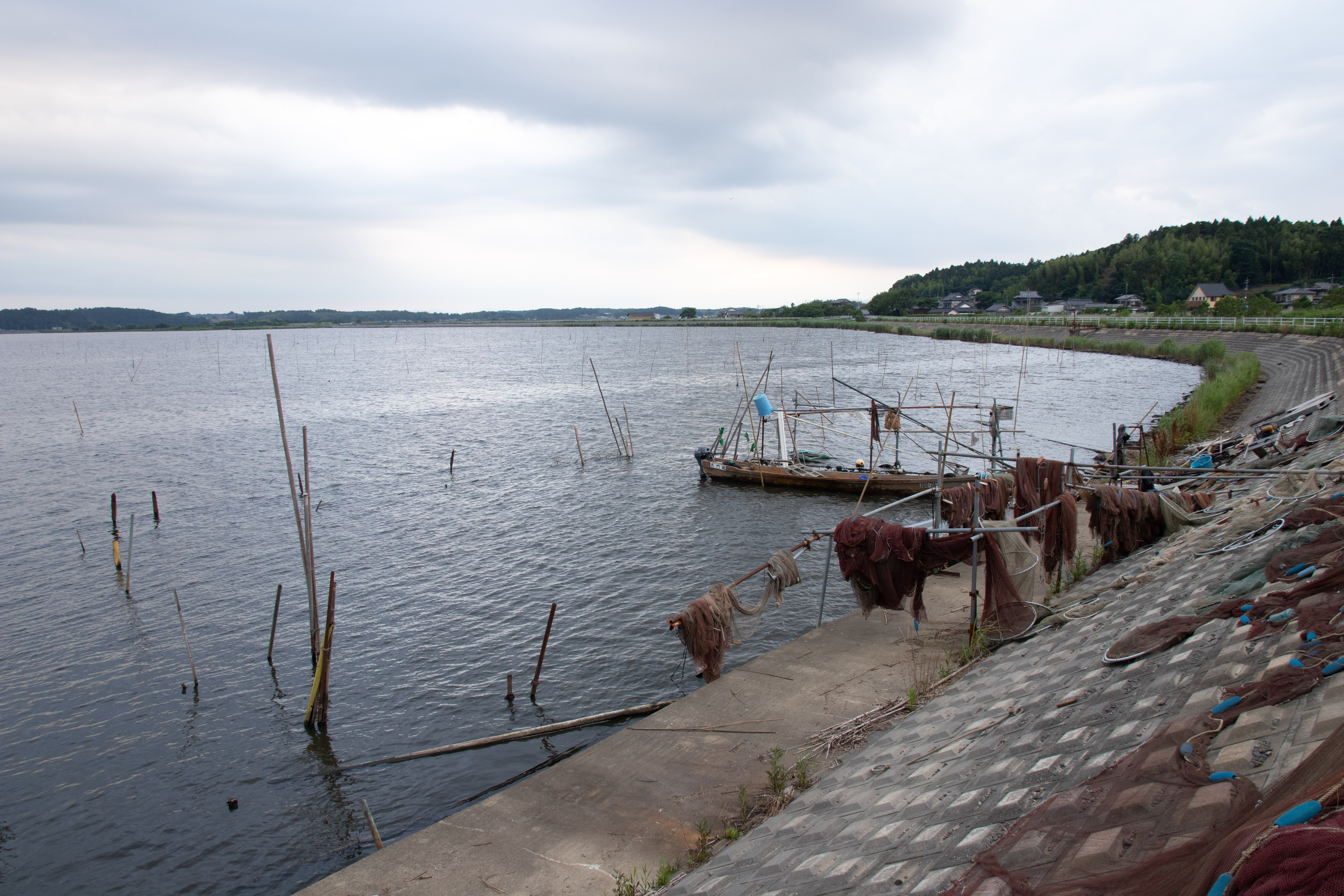
Lake Hinuma

Ibaraki (茨城町, Ibaraki-machi) is a town located in Ibaraki Prefecture, Japan. As of 1 July 2020, the town had an estimated population of 31,596 in 12,052 households and a population density of 260 inhabitants per square kilometre (670/sq mi). The percentage of the population aged over 65 was 34.9%. The total area of the town is 121.58 square kilometres (46.94 sq mi).

== Geography ==
Located in central Ibaraki Prefecture, south of prefectural capital of Mito, Ibaraki is located in the flatlands near the Pacific Ocean, and almost encompasses Lake Hinuma, the 30th largest body of freshwater in Japan.

=== Surrounding municipalities ===
Ibaraki Prefecture

- Hokota
- Kasama
- Mito
- Ōarai
- Omitama

=== Climate ===
Ibaraki has a humid continental climate (Köppen Cfa) characterized by warm summers and cold winters with light snowfall. The average annual temperature in Ibaraki is 13.9 °C. The average annual rainfall is 1367 mm with September as the wettest month. The temperatures are highest on average in August, at around 25.7 °C, and lowest in January, at around 3.1 °C.

== Demographics ==
Per Japanese census data, the population of Ibaraki has remained relatively steadily for the past 40 years.

Historical population
Year	Pop.	±%
1950	31,639	—
1960	30,845	−2.5%
1970	29,956	−2.9%
1980	32,901	+9.8%
1990	35,651	+8.4%
2000	35,296	−1.0%
2010	34,513	−2.2%
2020	31,401	−9.0%

== History ==
The villages of Nagaoka, Kawane, Kaminoai and Ishizaki were created within Higashiibaraki District and the village of Numasaki was created within Kashima District with the establishment of the modern municipalities system on April 1, 1889. Nagaoka was elevated to town status on February 11, 1955, and merged with Kawane and Kaminoai to form the town of Ibaraki the same day. Ibaraki annexed neighboring Ishizaki on March 5, 1958. The town was set to merge with Mito, on December 8, 2007, but following the election of a new mayor in April 2007, these plans were abandoned.

== Government ==
Ibaraki has a mayor-council form of government with a directly elected mayor and a unicameral town council of 16 members. Ibaraki, together with neighboring Hokota and Ōarai, contributes two members to the Ibaraki Prefectural Assembly. In terms of national politics, the town is part of Ibaraki 2nd district of the lower house of the Diet of Japan.

== Economy ==
The economy of Ibaraki is primarily agricultural.

== Education ==
- Ibaraki has four public elementary schools and two public middle schools operated by the town government, and one public high school operated by the Ibaraki Prefectural Board of Education.

== Transportation ==
=== Railway ===
- Ibaraki does not have any passenger train service.

=== Highway ===
- Kita-Kantō Expressway – Ibarakimachi-Nishi Interchange, Ibarakimachi Junction, Ibarakimachi-Higashi Interchange
- Higashi-Kantō Expressway – Ibaraki Kuko Kita Interchange, Ibarakimachi Interchange
- National Route 6

== Local attractions ==
- Hinuma Hydrangea Festival
- Ibaraki Festival

== Noted people from Ibaraki ==
- Kami, drummer of Malice Mizer
- Hideaki Tomiyama, Olympic gold medalist in wrestling
