= 2001 FIFA Confederations Cup =

대한민국/일본 2001년 2001 韓国/日本

Tournament details
- Host countries: South Korea; Japan
- Dates: 30 May – 10 June
- Teams: 8 (from 6 confederations)
- Venues: 6 (in 6 host cities)

Final positions
- Champions: France (1st title)
- Runners-up: Japan
- Third place: Australia
- Fourth place: Brazil

Tournament statistics
- Matches played: 16
- Goals scored: 31 (1.94 per match)
- Attendance: 557,191 (34,824 per match)
- Top scorer(s): (France) Eric Carrière (Australia) Shaun Murphy (France) Robert Pires (South Korea) Hwang Sun-hong (Japan) Takayuki Suzuki (France) Patrick Vieira (France) Sylvain Wiltord (2 goals each)
- Best player: (France) Robert Pires
- Fair play award: Japan

The 2001 FIFA Confederations Cup was the fifth FIFA Confederations Cup and the third to be organized by FIFA. It was also the first in which the original hosts, Saudi Arabia, did not participate (they were the nation who founded the tournament, previously known as the King Fahd Cup). The tournament was played from 30 May to 10 June 2001, and co-hosted by South Korea and Japan, who were also hosts for the 2002 FIFA World Cup finals; as such, this was the first edition of the FIFA Confederations Cup that served as preparation for the World Cup the following year, although this idea would not be formalized until the 2005 edition. It was won by France, beating hosts Japan 1–0, with a goal from Patrick Vieira.

By winning the tournament along with the 1998 FIFA World Cup and UEFA Euro 2000, France became the second team to simultaneously be World Cup champions, continental champions, and Confederations Cup winners, after Brazil in 1997.

The eight teams were split into two groups of four, in which each team played each of the others once, with the top two in each group advancing to the semi-finals.

== Qualified teams ==
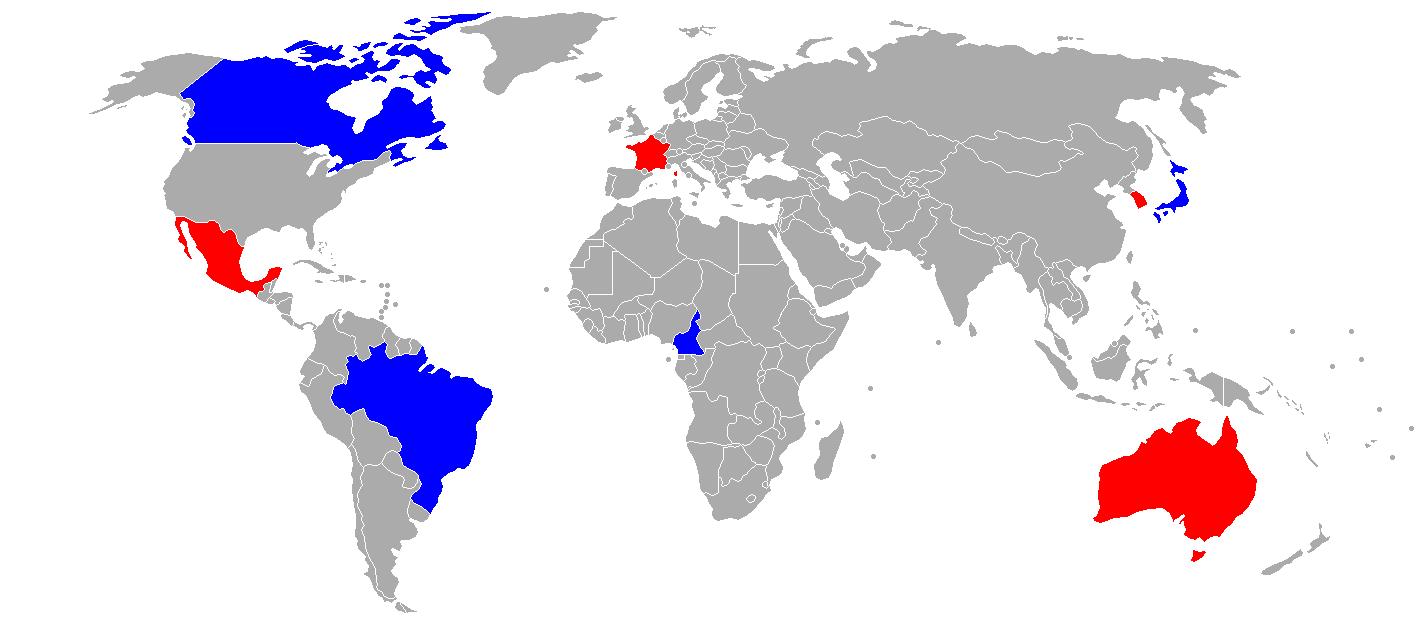
2001 FIFA Confederations Cup participating teams

Team	Confederation	Qualification method	Date qualification secured	Participation no.
South Korea	AFC	Co-hosts	31 May 1996	1st
Japan	AFC	Co-hosts and 2000 AFC Asian Cup winners	31 May 1996	2nd
France	UEFA	1998 FIFA World Cup and UEFA Euro 2000 winners	12 July 1998	1st
Brazil	CONMEBOL	1999 Copa América winners	18 July 1999	3rd
Cameroon	CAF	2000 African Cup of Nations winners	13 February 2000	1st
Canada	CONCACAF	2000 CONCACAF Gold Cup winners	27 February 2000	1st
Australia	OFC	2000 OFC Nations Cup winners	28 June 2000	2nd
Mexico	CONCACAF	1999 FIFA Confederations Cup winners	2 July 2000	4th

== Venues ==
South Korea
Daegu	Ulsan	Suwon	2001 FIFA Confederations Cup is located in South Korea
Daegu World Cup Stadium	Ulsan Munsu Football Stadium	Suwon World Cup Stadium	2001 FIFA Confederations Cup is located in South Korea
Capacity: 68,014	Capacity: 43,550	Capacity: 43,188	2001 FIFA Confederations Cup is located in South Korea
Japan
Yokohama	Ibaraki	Niigata	2001 FIFA Confederations Cup is located in Japan
International Stadium Yokohama	Kashima Soccer Stadium	Niigata Stadium	2001 FIFA Confederations Cup is located in Japan
Capacity: 72,327	Capacity: 40,728	Capacity: 42,300	2001 FIFA Confederations Cup is located in Japan

== Match referees ==
Africa

- (Egypt) Gamal Al-Ghandour
- (Zimbabwe) Felix Tangawarima

Asia

- (United Arab Emirates) Ali Bujsaim
- (China) Lu Jun

Europe

- (Scotland) Hugh Dallas
- (Germany) Hellmut Krug
- (Denmark) Kim Milton Nielsen

North America, Central America and Caribbean

- (Mexico) Benito Archundia
- (Guatemala) Carlos Batres

Oceania

- (Australia) Simon Micallef

South America

- (Ecuador) Byron Moreno
- (Colombia) Óscar Ruiz

== Group stage ==
=== Group A ===
Pos	Team	Pld	W	D	L	GF	GA	GD	Pts	Qualification
1	France	3	2	0	1	9	1	+8	6	Advance to Knockout stage
2	Australia	3	2	0	1	3	1	+2	6	Advance to Knockout stage
3	South Korea	3	2	0	1	3	6	−3	6	
4	Mexico	3	0	0	3	1	8	−7	0	

30 May 2001
17:00 KST

France	5–0	South Korea
Marlet 9'; Vieira 19'; Anelka 34'; Djorkaeff 80'; Wiltord 90'	Report

Daegu World Cup Stadium, Daegu
Attendance: 61,500
Referee: Gamal Al-Ghandour (Egypt)

30 May 2001
19:30 KST

Mexico	0–2	Australia
	Report	Murphy 20'; Skoko 54'

Suwon World Cup Stadium, Suwon
Attendance: 6,232
Referee: Felix Tangawarima (Zimbabwe)

1 June 2001
17:00 KST

Australia	1–0	France
Zane 60'	Report

Daegu World Cup Stadium, Daegu
Attendance: 44,400
Referee: Carlos Batres (Guatemala)

1 June 2001
19:30 KST

South Korea	2–1	Mexico
Hwang Sun-hong 56'; Yoo Sang-chul 90'	Report	V. Ruiz 81'

Ulsan Munsu Football Stadium, Ulsan
Attendance: 41,550
Referee: Hugh Dallas (Scotland)

3 June 2001
19:30 KST

France	4–0	Mexico
Wiltord 9'; Carrière 63', 84'; Pires 72'	Report

Ulsan Munsu Football Stadium, Ulsan
Attendance: 28,864
Referee: Ali Bujsaim (United Arab Emirates)

3 June 2001
19:30 KST

South Korea	1–0	Australia
Hwang Sun-hong 24'	Report

Suwon World Cup Stadium, Suwon
Attendance: 42,754
Referee: Óscar Ruiz (Colombia)

=== Group B ===
Team	Pld	W	D	L	GF	GA	GD	Pts
Japan	3	2	1	0	5	0	+5	7
Brazil	3	1	2	0	2	0	+2	5
Cameroon	3	1	0	2	2	4	−2	3
Canada	3	0	1	2	0	5	−5	1

31 May 2001
17:00 JST

Brazil	2–0	Cameroon
Washington 53'; Carlos Miguel 57'	Report

Kashima Soccer Stadium, Ibaraki
Attendance: 10,519
Referee: Hellmut Krug (Germany)

31 May 2001
19:30 JST

Japan	3–0	Canada
Ono 57'; Nishizawa 60'; Morishima 88'	Report

Niigata Stadium, Niigata
Attendance: 39,006
Referee: Simon Micallef (Australia)

2 June 2001
17:00 JST

Canada	0–0	Brazil
	Report

Kashima Soccer Stadium, Ibaraki
Attendance: 12,095
Referee: Lu Jun (China)

2 June 2001
19:30 JST

Cameroon	0–2	Japan
	Report	Suzuki 8', 65'

Niigata Stadium, Niigata
Attendance: 39,430
Referee: Benito Archundia (Mexico)

4 June 2001
19:30 JST

Brazil	0–0	Japan
	Report

Kashima Soccer Stadium, Ibaraki
Attendance: 37,740
Referee: Kim Milton Nielsen (Denmark)

4 June 2001
19:30 JST

Cameroon	2–0	Canada
Tchoutang 48'; M'Boma 83'	Report

Niigata Stadium, Niigata
Attendance: 15,822
Referee: Byron Moreno (Ecuador)

== Knockout stage ==
Semi-finals
7 June – Yokohama
Japan	1
Australia	0
7 June – Suwon
France	2
Brazil	1

Final
10 June – Yokohama
Japan	0
France	1
Third place
9 June – Ulsan
Australia	1
Brazil	0

=== Semi-finals ===
7 June 2001
17:00 JST

Japan	1–0	Australia
H. Nakata 43'	Report

International Stadium Yokohama, Yokohama
Attendance: 48,699
Referee: Benito Archundia (Mexico)

7 June 2001
20:00 KST

France	2–1	Brazil
Pires 7'; Desailly 54'	Report	Ramon 30'

Suwon World Cup Stadium, Suwon
Attendance: 34,527
Referee: Gamal Al-Ghandour (Egypt)

=== Third place play-off ===
9 June 2001
19:00 KST

Australia	1–0	Brazil
Murphy 84'	Report

Ulsan Munsu Football Stadium, Ulsan
Attendance: 28,520
Referee: Hellmut Krug (Germany)

=== Final ===
10 June 2001
19:00 JST

Japan	0–1	France
	Report	Vieira 30'

International Stadium Yokohama, Yokohama
Attendance: 65,533
Referee: Ali Bujsaim (United Arab Emirates)

== Awards ==
Golden Ball	Golden Shoe	FIFA Fair Play Trophy
(France) Robert Pires	(France) Robert Pires	Japan
Silver Ball	Silver Shoe	Japan
(France) Patrick Vieira	(France) Eric Carrière	Japan
Bronze Ball	Bronze Shoe	Japan
(Japan) Hidetoshi Nakata	(South Korea) Hwang Sun-hong	Japan

Source: FIFA

== Statistics ==
=== Goalscorers ===
A total of 31 goals were scored by 24 different players. None of them are credited as an own goal.

2 goals

- (Australia) Shaun Murphy
- (France) Eric Carrière
- (France) Robert Pires
- (France) Patrick Vieira
- (France) Sylvain Wiltord
- (Japan) Takayuki Suzuki
- (South Korea) Hwang Sun-hong

1 goal

- (Australia) Josip Skoko
- (Australia) Clayton Zane
- (Brazil) Washington
- (Brazil) Carlos Miguel
- (Brazil) Ramon Menezes
- (Cameroon) Bernard Tchoutang
- (Cameroon) Patrick M'Boma
- (France) Steve Marlet
- (France) Nicolas Anelka
- (France) Youri Djorkaeff
- (France) Marcel Desailly
- (Japan) Shinji Ono
- (Japan) Akinori Nishizawa
- (Japan) Hiroaki Morishima
- (Japan) Hidetoshi Nakata
- (South Korea) Yoo Sang-chul
- (Mexico) Víctor Ruiz

=== Tournament ranking ===
Per statistical convention in football, matches decided in extra time are counted as wins and losses, while matches decided by penalty shoot-outs are counted as draws.

Pos	Grp	Team	Pld	W	D	L	GF	GA	GD	Pts	Final result
1	A	France	5	4	0	1	12	2	+10	12	Champions
2	B	Japan (H)	5	3	1	1	6	1	+5	10	Runners-up
3	A	Australia	5	3	0	2	4	2	+2	9	Third place
4	B	Brazil	5	1	2	2	3	3	0	5	Fourth place
5	A	South Korea (H)	3	2	0	1	3	6	−3	6	Eliminated in group stage
6	B	Cameroon	3	1	0	2	2	4	−2	3	Eliminated in group stage
7	B	Canada	3	0	1	2	0	5	−5	1	Eliminated in group stage
8	A	Mexico	3	0	0	3	1	8	−7	0	Eliminated in group stage

Source: FIFA
(H) Hosts
