= South Korea v Italy (2002 FIFA World Cup) =

2002 FIFA World Cup Round of 16 match

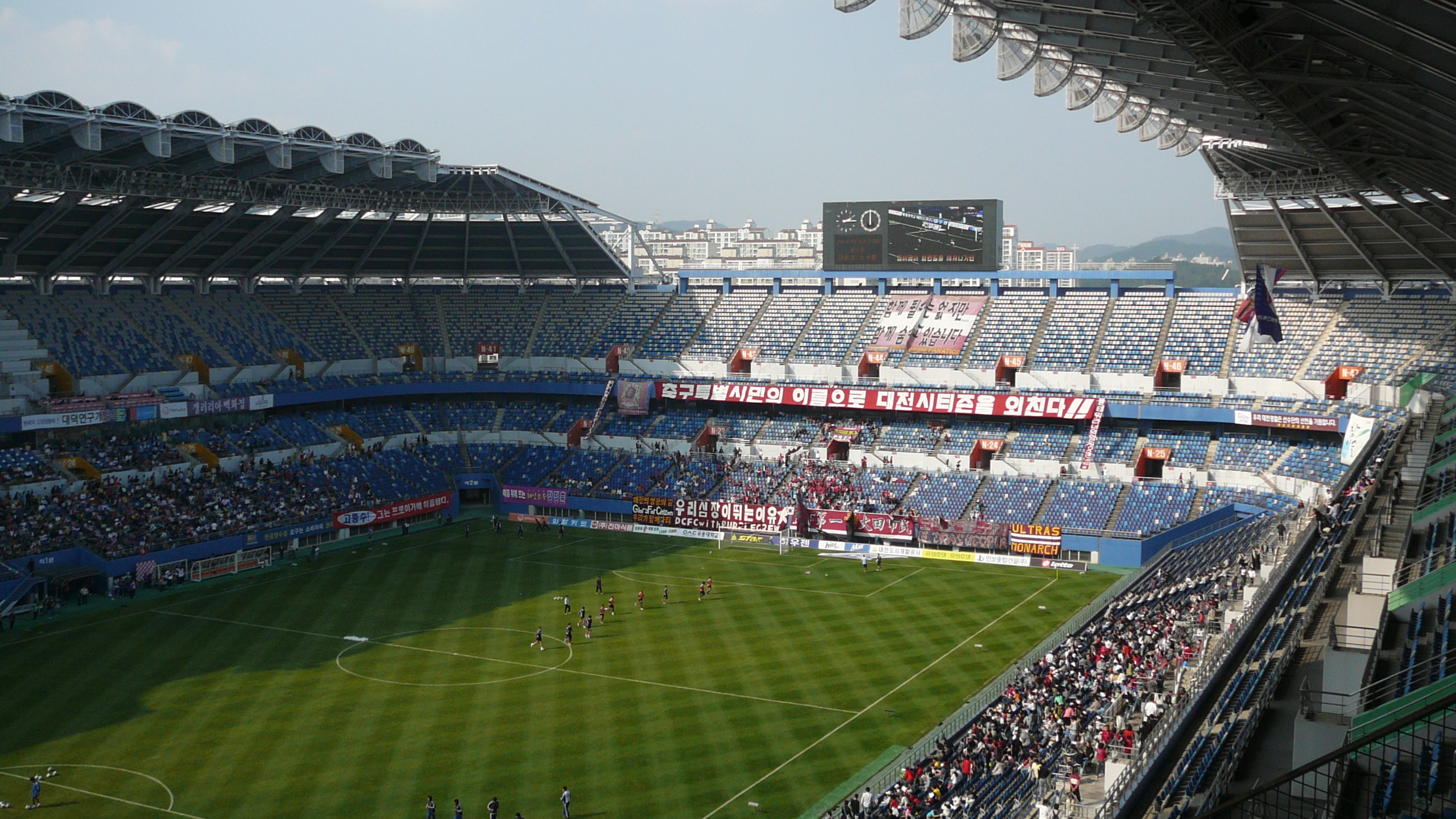
- Daejeon World Cup Stadium, where the match took place
- Event: 2002 FIFA World Cup; Round of 16
South Korea	Italy
(South Korea)	(Italy)
2	1
- Golden goal (a.e.t.)
- Date: 18 June 2002
- Venue: Daejeon World Cup Stadium, Daejeon
- Man of the Match: Ahn Jung-hwan (South Korea)
- Referee: Byron Moreno (Ecuador)
- Attendance: 38,588
- Weather: Clear, 26 °C (79 °F), 65% humidity

The South Korea v Italy football match took place on 18 June 2002 at the Daejeon World Cup Stadium in Daejeon, South Korea. It was the final match of the round of 16 at the 2002 FIFA World Cup. Co-hosts South Korea defeated then-three-time World Cup champions Italy 2–1 in extra time via a golden goal scored by Ahn Jung-hwan in the 117th minute.

The match is widely remembered as one of the biggest upsets and most controversial fixtures in World Cup history, due to several disputed officiating decisions made by Ecuadorian referee Byron Moreno.

== Background ==
South Korea qualified to the 2002 World Cup as hosts of the competition, along with Japan. The joint bid had been awarded the right to host the cup on 31 May 1996. Guus Hiddink was appointed South Korea coach in December 2000 on a contract valid from 1 January 2001, a decision that was seen with suspicion by the Koreans at the time. Hiddink's squad had a poor FIFA Confederations Cup campaign in 2001, that included a 5–0 loss to world-champions France. Hiddink believed that his team could spend three months to prepare the tournament and instill his 3–5–2 on his players.

In July 2000, Giovanni Trapattoni took charge of the Italy national football team after the resignation of Dino Zoff. Italy qualified for 2002 FIFA World Cup by virtue of their first place in their qualifying group with six wins and two draws. The roster at Trapattoni's disposal was regarded as star-studded, especially in the attack with players such as Francesco Totti, Alessandro Del Piero, Filippo Inzaghi, Vincenzo Montella. Some commentators have argued that the 2002 squad had greater individual talent than Italy's 2006 World Cup-winning team, while criticizing Trapattoni's management of the side. Forward Roberto Baggio's exclusion sparkled controversy in Italy with Baggio viewing it as a betrayal.

It was the second time the teams faced each other, with the other one being on 10 June 1986 in which Italy defeated South Korea 3–2 in the World Cup in Mexico.

Drawn into Group D, South Korea placed first with seven points and qualified for the round of 16. On Matchday 1, they beat Poland 2–0 in Busan, which marked their first victory in a World Cup final phase. They later drew 1–1 against the United States with Ahn Jung-hwan equalizing Clint Mathis's goal. Finally, their most controversial game was the 1–0 victory over Portugal, who had two players sent-off by referee Ángel Sanchez. After 48 years of participating in the World Cup, it was the first time South Korea passed the first round of such a competition.

Italy arrived second in Group G in Japan as late as on Matchday 3. They started with a relatively comfortable 2–0 win over Ecuador courtesy of a Christian Vieri brace. In the second match against Croatia, Vieri opened the scoreboard again, after a previous effort had been disallowed by Graham Poll. Croatia eventually came back with Ivica Olić and Milan Rapaić, even though Italy would have equalized with Marco Materazzi, whose goal was also overturned for Inzaghi supposedly holding back an opponent. The decisive match, held in Oita on 13 June between Mexico and Italy, started with Inzaghi netting the opener from a Totti pass in the 12th minute. This goal was ruled out for offside. After Mexico took the lead with Jared Borgetti, Montella seemingly levelled the score after being sent clear by Totti, but Italy were again denied a goal. However, they finally managed to make it 1–1 after subbed-in Del Piero scored from a Montella cross. As Ecuador prevailed 2–0 over Croatia, both Mexico and Italy qualified to the knockout phase.

== Match ==
=== Pre match ===
On the eve of the game, South Korean newspaper The Dong-A Ilbo expressed deep optimism for the upcoming fixture against Italy by emphasizing their positive momentum with two victories, including one against fifth-ranked Portugal, and one loss. Hiddink stated that his team's primary objective of overcoming the group stage had already been achieved and that they could play without anxiety. In the lead-up to the match, the press saw the in-form South Koreans as the favourites to win, particularly as Italy's usual starting defensive pair of Alessandro Nesta and Fabio Cannavaro were both unavailable, due to injury and suspension, respectively. The pre-game choreography by the Korean fans also saw supporters hold up red and white cards spelling out the words "Again 1966", a reference to Italy's elimination at the hands of North Korea in the first round of the 1966 World Cup.

=== Summary ===
==== First half ====
South Korea started aggressively: as early as in the 4th minute, Francesco Coco was booked after scything down Park Ji-sung. Upon the subsequent free kick, Christian Panucci brought down Seol Ki-hyeon and a penalty was awarded for South Korea. Ahn took the penalty kick, but Italian goalkeeper Gianluigi Buffon saved the low effort shot to keep the match goalless. In the 11th minute, fed by Damiano Tommasi, Vieri had a chance to score but his curling shot went off wide.

Italy took the lead in the 18th minute when Vieri headed in a corner kick delivered by Totti. Four minutes later, Totti himself was booked over an aerial challenge with Kim Tae-young. In the 35th minute, Ahn won a series of bounces and freed himself with a backheel strike, but his effort went over the bar. Totti slipped it to Tommasi, who had his one-on-one shot saved by Lee Won-jae in the 41st minute. Following an aerial duel before the half-time break, Coco started bleeding in his brow. He played the remainder of the game with a visible band-aid on his head. The first half ended with a low long-distance strike from Ahn, saved by Buffon.

==== Second half ====
In the second half, South Korea increased their physical intensity and offensive pressure. Guus Hiddink made tactical substitutions, bringing on forward Hwang Sun-hong, winger Lee Chun-soo, and striker Cha Du-ri to form an all-out attack. In the 50th minute, Kim Tae-young, who had been yellow carded in the 17th minute for a foul, elbowed Del Piero but was spared from any card.

In the 72nd minute, Hwang made a careless slide on Gianluca Zambrotta, who had to be brought out of the field on a stretcher. Moreno himself later admitted that the foul should have resulted in a send-off. Zambrotta was replaced by Angelo Di Livio. After six minutes, Totti made a sprint and overtook two defenders; upon entering the box, he attempted a dribble and ended up being pulled down. Moreno let play continue, to Trapattoni and the spectators' surprise. After a long siege of Italy's area, a failed clearance by Panucci allowed Seol to seize the loose ball inside the box and strike a left-footed volley past Buffon, equalizing the score at 1–1 and sending the match into extra time. Seconds before the final whistle, Vieri failed an easy tap-in.

==== Extra time and golden goal ====
Under FIFA rules at the time, the golden goal rule was in effect during extra time, meaning the first team to score would instantly win the match. In the 103rd minute, Totti fell in the South Korean penalty area following a challenge by Song Chong-gug. Moreno deemed Totti to have dived and issued him a second yellow card, resulting in his dismissal. Minutes later, Tommasi ran onto a pass and scored what appeared to be the winning golden goal for Italy. However, the assistant referee Jorge Rattalino flagged Tommasi for offside, a decision that replay footage later showed to be extremely tight or incorrectly called. In the 117th minute, Lee Young-pyo floated a cross into the penalty box. Ahn outjumped Italian captain Paolo Maldini to head the ball into the corner of the net, scoring the golden goal and sending South Korea into the quarter-finals.

=== Details ===
18 June 2002
20:30

South Korea	2–1 (a.e.t./g.g.)	Italy
Seol Ki-hyeon 88'; Ahn Jung-hwan 117'		Vieri 18'

Daejeon World Cup Stadium, Daejeon
Attendance: 38,588
Referee: Byron Moreno (Ecuador)

South Korea	Italy

GK	1	Lee Woon-jae
CB	4	Choi Jin-cheul	(yellow card) 115'
CB	20	Hong Myung-bo (c)		(substituted off) 83'
CB	7	Kim Tae-young	(yellow card) 17'	(substituted off) 63'
RM	22	Song Chong-gug	(yellow card) 80'
CM	6	Yoo Sang-chul
CM	5	Kim Nam-il		(substituted off) 68'
LM	10	Lee Young-pyo
RF	21	Park Ji-sung
CF	19	Ahn Jung-hwan
LF	9	Seol Ki-hyeon
Substitutions:
FW	18	Hwang Sun-hong		(substituted on) 63'
FW	14	Lee Chun-soo	(yellow card) 99'	(substituted on) 68'
FW	16	Cha Du-ri		(substituted on) 83'
Manager:
(Netherlands) Guus Hiddink

GK	1	Gianluigi Buffon
RB	2	Christian Panucci
CB	15	Mark Iuliano
CB	3	Paolo Maldini (c)
LB	4	Francesco Coco	(yellow card) 4'
RM	17	Damiano Tommasi	(yellow card) 55'
CM	6	Cristiano Zanetti	(yellow card) 59'
LM	19	Gianluca Zambrotta		(substituted off) 72'
AM	7	Alessandro Del Piero		(substituted off) 61'
AM	10	Francesco Totti	(yellow card) 22' (yellow-red card) 103'
CF	21	Christian Vieri
Substitutions:
MF	8	Gennaro Gattuso		(substituted on) 61'
MF	16	Angelo Di Livio		(substituted on) 72'
Manager:
Giovanni Trapattoni

Man of the Match:
Ahn Jung-hwan (South Korea)

Assistant referees:
Jorge Rattalino (Argentina)
Ferenc Szekely (Hungary)
Fourth official:
Mohamed Guezzaz (Morocco)

=== Statistics ===
Statistic	South Korea	Italy
Goals scored	2	1
Total shots	12	12
Shots on target	8	6
Ball possession	56%	44%
Corner kicks	10	3
Fouls committed	27	23
Offsides	1	5
Yellow cards	2	3
Red cards	0	1

== Aftermath and controversy ==
=== Reaction ===
During the match, Italian sports commentator Bruno Pizzul expressed his disbelief over the refereeing decisions. On 19 June 2002, the La Gazzetta dello Sport frontpage read "Vergogna!" ("Shame!"), whereas Corriere dello Sport wrote "Ladri!" ("Thieves!"). Il Messaggero began with "Scandalo Mondiale!" ("World-class scandal!").

=== Impact on Ahn Jung-hwan ===
Ahn joined Serie A club Perugia in 2000 on a two-year loan from Busan IPark. Having started with great expectations from fans, his performances were seen as rather disappointing: he scored four goals in fifteen appearances in 2000–01 and one in fifteen the following season. Following his golden goal, Ahn fell out with the club. Perugia ended up paying the player's buyout clause but Ahn refused the deal. After FIFA intervened in the dispute, Ahn was required to pay Perugia a compensation fee, which he did with the help of a Japanese entertainment company. This incident led to Ahn spending the next three years playing in the J1 League instead of big leagues in Europe.

=== Referee Byron Moreno ===
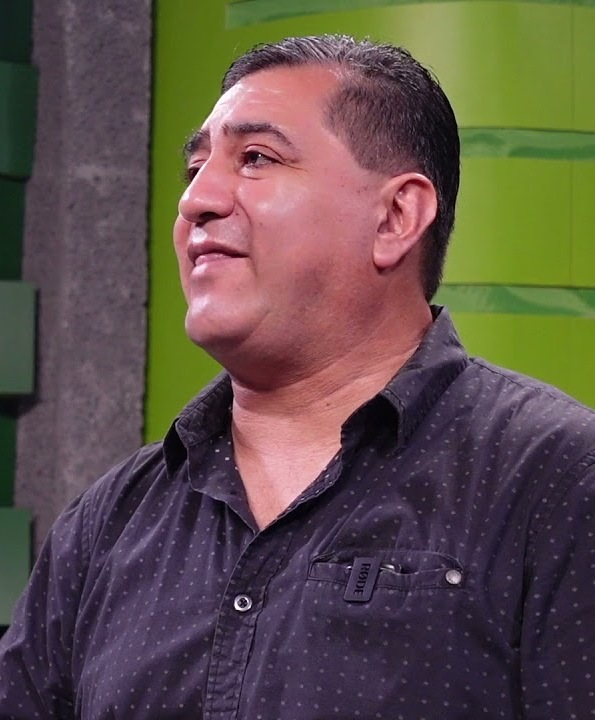
Byron Moreno, the referee of the match

In September 2002, Moreno was suspended for twenty matches by the Ecuadorian football federation over adding around twelve stoppage-time minutes, instead of the initially ruled six, in a local league match where the home club Liga de Quito overturned the result against Barcelona SC and won 4–3. He additionally awarded two contested penalties and bred confusion after first allowing and then disallowing a goal. Moreno was a candidate in local elections in Quito. He was investigated by FIFA Disciplinary Committee.

On 9 January 2003, he appeared in Rai 2 TV program Stupido Hotel. He was subject to a cold shower and the public started singing an edited version of Zucchero's Baila Morena song, featuring "Byron, Byron Moreno. If he could run over you by train..." Interviewed by José Altafini, the referee said that Italy's exit from the World Cup in Korea and Japan was not on him, but rather on Italy failing to convert goalscoring chances.

In February, he took part in Cento Carnival where he was booed, insulted and thrown coins and eggs. The summer of that year, the organizer of the carnival invited him to referee the final of a seven-a-side football tournament in Bondeno, Emilia Romagna. On this occasion, he was again targeted with eggs.

In May, in his third game back from suspension, Moreno was again suspended, this time for one match, after he sent off three players from visiting Deportivo Quito in a 1–1 draw with Deportivo Cuenca. On 10 June, he was disqualified by FIFA.

=== Tournament progression ===
Co-hosts South Korea faced Spain in the 2002 World Cup quarter-finals on 22 June, in Gwangju. South Korea had progressed to the quarter-finals after defeating Italy with a golden goal, while Spain overcame Ireland in the round of 16 in a penalty shoot-out victory. In the second half of regulation time, Spanish midfielder Rubén Baraja scored from a header, but it was disallowed by referee Gamal Al-Ghandour because of alleged shirt pulling and pushing in the penalty area; a 0–0 deadlock saw the match go into extra-time. In the first half of extra-time, Spanish striker Fernando Morientes appeared to score the golden goal with a header, but the referee disallowed it after the linesman raised his flag, as he erroneously felt that the ball had gone out of play for a goal kick before being crossed in by winger Joaquín; later on in the half, Morientes came close to scoring again when he hit the post with a first-time half-volley following a throw-in. With both sides still failing to score, the match went to a penalty shoot-out; South Korea's goalkeeper Lee Woon-jae saved Joaquín's spot kick – who had been carrying an injury – while South Korea converted all of their penalties – with Hong Myung-bo scoring the decisive spot-kick – to win the shoot-out 5–3, becoming the first Asian side ever to reach the semi-finals of the World Cup. However, following prior criticism in the media over the quality of officiating in South Korea's win over Italy in the round of 16, there was further controversy surrounding the contentious decisions made by the officials in South Korea's quarter-final victory, as the referee had disallowed both of Spain's goals after his linesmen Ali Tomusange and Michael Ragoonath had raised their flags. Spanish midfielder Iván Helguera, who had to be restrained after the match when he attempted to confront the referee, was particularly vocal in his criticism of the officials' decisions, stating afterwards: "What happened here was robbery. Everyone saw two perfectly good goals. If Spain didn't win, it's because they didn't want us to win. I feel terrible about this game."

FIFA admitted that refereeing mistakes had been committed. To restore credibility in the tournament, European referees were appointed for the Final Four. The semi-final was held on 26 June at the Seoul World Cup Stadium against Germany, with the Germans winning 1–0 thanks to Michael Ballack's 75th-minute net. The match, officiated by Swiss Urs Meier, was described as well-refereed. On 29 June, South Korea lost 3–2 to Turkey and finished the tournament as fourth.

== See also ==
- South Korea at the FIFA World Cup
- Italy at the FIFA World Cup
