= 2002 FIFA World Cup Group B =

Football tournament group stage

Group B of the 2002 FIFA World Cup took place between 2 and 12 June 2002. Spain won the group and advanced to the second round along with Paraguay, who beat South Africa to finish in second place on goals scored. That team and Slovenia failed to advance.

== Standings ==
Pos	Team	Pld	W	D	L	GF	GA	GD	Pts	Qualification
1	Spain	3	3	0	0	9	4	+5	9	Advance to knockout stage
2	Paraguay	3	1	1	1	6	6	0	4	Advance to knockout stage
3	South Africa	3	1	1	1	5	5	0	4	
4	Slovenia	3	0	0	3	2	7	−5	0	

Source: FIFA
Rules for classification: Tie-breaking criteria
- Spain advanced to play Republic of Ireland (runner-up of Group E) in the round of 16.
- Paraguay advanced to play Germany (winner of Group E) in the round of 16.

== Matches ==
All times are local (UTC+9)

=== Paraguay vs South Africa ===
2 June 2002
16:30

Paraguay	2–2	South Africa
Santa Cruz 39'; Arce 55'		T. Mokoena 63'; Fortune 90+1' (pen.)

Busan Asiad Main Stadium, Busan
Attendance: 25,186
Referee: Ľuboš Micheľ (Slovakia)

Paraguay	South Africa

GK	22	Ricardo Tavarelli	(yellow card) 90'
CB	18	Julio César Cáceres	(yellow card) 35'
CB	5	Celso Ayala
CB	4	Carlos Gamarra (c)
RWB	2	Francisco Arce
LWB	21	Denis Caniza	(yellow card) 65'
CM	10	Roberto Acuña
CM	6	Estanislao Struway		(substituted off) 86'
CM	8	Guido Alvarenga		(substituted off) 66'
AM	11	Jorge Campos		(substituted off) 73'
CF	9	Roque Santa Cruz
Substitutions:
MF	14	Diego Gavilán		(substituted on) 66'
MF	16	Gustavo Morínigo		(substituted on) 73'
DF	17	Juan Carlos Franco	(yellow card) 90+3'	(substituted on) 86'
Manager:
(Italy) Cesare Maldini

GK	16	Andre Arendse
RB	4	Aaron Mokoena	(yellow card) 3'
CB	13	Pierre Issa	(yellow card) 9'	(substituted off) 27'
CB	19	Lucas Radebe (c)
LB	3	Bradley Carnell
RM	2	Cyril Nzama
CM	12	Teboho Mokoena
CM	6	MacBeth Sibaya
LM	7	Quinton Fortune
CF	17	Benni McCarthy	(yellow card) 38'	(substituted off) 78'
CF	15	Sibusiso Zuma	(yellow card) 45+2'
Substitutions:
MF	9	MacDonald Mukasi		(substituted on) 27'
FW	23	George Koumantarakis		(substituted on) 78'
Manager:
Jomo Sono

Man of the Match:
Francisco Arce (Paraguay)

Assistant referees:
Igor Šramka (Slovakia)
Curtis Charles (Antigua and Barbuda)
Fourth official:
Hugh Dallas (Scotland)

=== Spain vs Slovenia ===
2 June 2002
20:30

Spain	3–1	Slovenia
Raúl 44'; Valerón 74'; Hierro 87' (pen.)		Cimirotič 82'

Gwangju World Cup Stadium, Gwangju
Attendance: 28,598
Referee: Mohamed Guezzaz (Morocco)

Spain	Slovenia

GK	1	Iker Casillas
RB	5	Carles Puyol
CB	6	Fernando Hierro (c)
CB	20	Miguel Ángel Nadal
LB	3	Juanfran		(substituted off) 82'
RM	21	Luis Enrique		(substituted off) 74'
CM	17	Juan Carlos Valerón	(yellow card) 36'
CM	8	Rubén Baraja
LM	11	Javier de Pedro
CF	7	Raúl
CF	10	Diego Tristán		(substituted off) 67'
Substitutions:
FW	9	Fernando Morientes		(substituted on) 67'
DF	4	Iván Helguera		(substituted on) 74'
DF	15	Enrique Romero		(substituted on) 82'
Manager:
José Antonio Camacho

GK	1	Marko Simeunovič
CB	3	Željko Milinovič
CB	5	Marinko Galič
CB	6	Aleksander Knavs
RM	7	Đoni Novak		(substituted off) 77'
CM	8	Aleš Čeh (c)
CM	11	Miran Pavlin
LM	19	Amir Karić	(yellow card) 45+1'
AM	10	Zlatko Zahovič		(substituted off) 63'
AM	13	Mladen Rudonja
CF	9	Milan Osterc		(substituted off) 57'
Substitutions:
FW	21	Sebastjan Cimirotič	(yellow card) 65'	(substituted on) 57'
MF	18	Milenko Ačimovič		(substituted on) 63'
MF	14	Saša Gajser		(substituted on) 77'
Manager:
Srečko Katanec

Man of the Match:
Raúl (Spain)

Assistant referees:
Ali Tomusange (Uganda)
Egon Bereuter (Austria)
Fourth official:
Coffi Codjia (Benin)

=== Spain vs Paraguay ===
This was a repeat of the two teams' second match at the 1998 tournament, a goalless draw.

7 June 2002
18:00

Spain	3–1	Paraguay
Morientes 53', 69'; Hierro 83' (pen.)		Puyol 10' (o.g.)

Jeonju World Cup Stadium, Jeonju
Attendance: 24,000
Referee: Gamal Al-Ghandour (Egypt)

Spain	Paraguay

GK	1	Iker Casillas
RB	5	Carles Puyol
CB	6	Fernando Hierro (c)
CB	20	Miguel Ángel Nadal
LB	3	Juanfran
RM	21	Luis Enrique		(substituted off) 46'
CM	8	Rubén Baraja	(yellow card) 9'
CM	17	Juan Carlos Valerón		(substituted off) 85'
LM	11	Javier de Pedro
CF	7	Raúl
CF	10	Diego Tristán		(substituted off) 46'
Substitutions:
DF	4	Iván Helguera		(substituted on) 46'
FW	9	Fernando Morientes		(substituted on) 46'
MF	19	Xavi		(substituted on) 85'
Manager:
José Antonio Camacho

GK	1	José Luis Chilavert (c)
CB	18	Julio César Cáceres
CB	5	Celso Ayala
CB	4	Carlos Gamarra
RWB	2	Francisco Arce	(yellow card) 44'
LWB	21	Denis Caniza		(substituted off) 78'
CM	14	Diego Gavilán	(yellow card) 60'
CM	10	Roberto Acuña
CM	13	Carlos Paredes
CF	9	Roque Santa Cruz	(yellow card) 80'
CF	20	José Cardozo		(substituted off) 63'
Substitutions:
FW	11	Jorge Campos		(substituted on) 63'
MF	6	Estanislao Struway		(substituted on) 78'
Manager:
(Italy) Cesare Maldini

Man of the Match:
Fernando Morientes (Spain)

Assistant referees:
Wagih Farag (Egypt)
Brighton Mudzamiri (Zimbabwe)
Fourth official:
Mohamed Guezzaz (Morocco)

=== South Africa vs Slovenia ===
8 June 2002
15:30

South Africa	1–0	Slovenia
Nomvethe 4'

Daegu World Cup Stadium, Daegu
Attendance: 47,226
Referee: Ángel Sánchez (Argentina)

South Africa	Slovenia

GK	16	Andre Arendse
RB	2	Cyril Nzama
CB	4	Aaron Mokoena
CB	19	Lucas Radebe (c)	(yellow card) 12'
LB	3	Bradley Carnell
RM	15	Sibusiso Zuma
CM	6	MacBeth Sibaya
CM	12	Teboho Mokoena	(yellow card) 59'
LM	7	Quinton Fortune		(substituted off) 84'
CF	14	Siyabonga Nomvethe		(substituted off) 71'
CF	17	Benni McCarthy		(substituted off) 80'
Substitutions:
MF	18	Delron Buckley		(substituted on) 71'
FW	23	George Koumantarakis		(substituted on) 80'
MF	11	Jabu Pule		(substituted on) 84'
Manager:
Jomo Sono

GK	1	Marko Simeunovič
CB	3	Željko Milinovič	(yellow card) 52'
CB	4	Muamer Vugdalič	(yellow card) 35'
CB	6	Aleksander Knavs		(substituted off) 60'
RM	7	Đoni Novak
CM	11	Miran Pavlin	(yellow card) 75'
CM	8	Aleš Čeh (c)	(yellow card) 62'
LM	19	Amir Karić
AM	18	Milenko Ačimovič		(substituted off) 60'
CF	21	Sebastjan Cimirotič		(substituted off) 41'
CF	13	Mladen Rudonja
Substitutions:
FW	9	Milan Osterc		(substituted on) 41'
MF	20	Nastja Čeh		(substituted on) 60'
DF	23	Spasoje Bulajič		(substituted on) 60'
Manager:
Srečko Katanec

Man of the Match:
Quinton Fortune (South Africa)

Assistant referees:
Jorge Rattalino (Argentina)
Ali Al Traifi (Saudi Arabia)
Fourth official:
Jan Wegereef (Netherlands)

=== South Africa vs Spain ===
12 June 2002
20:30

South Africa	2–3	Spain
McCarthy 31'; Radebe 53'		Raúl 4', 56'; Mendieta 45+1'

Daejeon World Cup Stadium, Daejeon
Attendance: 31,024
Referee: Saad Mane (Kuwait)

South Africa	Spain

GK	16	Andre Arendse
RB	2	Cyril Nzama	(yellow card) 16'
CB	4	Aaron Mokoena	(yellow card) 81'
CB	19	Lucas Radebe (c)		(substituted off) 80'
LB	3	Bradley Carnell	(yellow card) 67'
RM	15	Sibusiso Zuma
CM	6	MacBeth Sibaya
CM	12	Teboho Mokoena
LM	7	Quinton Fortune		(substituted off) 83'
CF	17	Benni McCarthy
CF	14	Siyabonga Nomvethe	(yellow card) 69'	(substituted off) 74'
Substitutions:
FW	23	George Koumantarakis		(substituted on) 74'
DF	22	Thabang Molefe		(substituted on) 80'
DF	5	Jacob Lekgetho		(substituted on) 83'
Manager:
Jomo Sono

GK	1	Iker Casillas
RB	2	Curro Torres
CB	4	Iván Helguera
CB	20	Miguel Ángel Nadal (c)
LB	15	Enrique Romero
RM	22	Joaquín
CM	19	Xavi
CM	14	David Albelda	(substituted off) 53'
LM	16	Gaizka Mendieta
CF	7	Raúl	(substituted off) 82'
CF	9	Fernando Morientes	(substituted off) 77'
Substitutions:
MF	18	Sergio	(substituted on) 53'
FW	12	Albert Luque	(substituted on) 77'
MF	21	Luis Enrique	(substituted on) 82'
Manager:
José Antonio Camacho

Man of the Match:
Raúl (Spain)

Assistant referees:
Jorge Rattalino (Argentina)
Awni Hassouneh (Jordan)
Fourth official:
Mohamed Guezzaz (Morocco)

=== Slovenia vs Paraguay ===
12 June 2002
20:30

Slovenia	1–3	Paraguay
Ačimovič 45+1'		Cuevas 65', 84'; Campos 73'

Jeju World Cup Stadium, Seogwipo
Attendance: 30,176
Referee: Felipe Ramos (Mexico)

Slovenia	Paraguay

GK	12	Mladen Dabanovič
CB	23	Spasoje Bulajič
CB	3	Željko Milinovič	(yellow card) 79'
CB	15	Rajko Tavčar
RM	7	Đoni Novak
CM	8	Aleš Čeh (c)
CM	11	Miran Pavlin	(yellow card) 15'	(substituted off) 40'
LM	19	Amir Karić	(yellow card) 68'
AM	18	Milenko Ačimovič		(substituted off) 62'
CF	21	Sebastjan Cimirotič
CF	9	Milan Osterc		(substituted off) 77'
Substitutions:
FW	13	Mladen Rudonja	(yellow card) 69'	(substituted on) 40'
MF	20	Nastja Čeh	(red card) 81'	(substituted on) 62'
FW	16	Senad Tiganj		(substituted on) 77'
Manager:
Danilo Popivoda

GK	1	José Luis Chilavert (c)
CB	18	Julio César Cáceres
CB	5	Celso Ayala
CB	4	Carlos Gamarra
RWB	2	Francisco Arce
LWB	21	Denis Caniza
CM	13	Carlos Paredes	(yellow card) 4' (yellow-red card) 22'
CM	10	Roberto Acuña
CM	8	Guido Alvarenga		(substituted off) 53'
CF	20	José Cardozo		(substituted off) 61'
CF	9	Roque Santa Cruz
Substitutions:
MF	11	Jorge Campos		(substituted on) 53'
FW	23	Nelson Cuevas		(substituted on) 61'	(substituted off) 90+2'
MF	17	Juan Carlos Franco			(substituted on) 90+2'
Manager:
(Italy) Cesare Maldini

Man of the Match:
Nelson Cuevas (Paraguay)

Assistant referees:
Leif Lindberg (Sweden)
Visva Krishnan (Singapore)
Fourth official:
Kim Young-joo (South Korea)

== See also ==
- Paraguay at the FIFA World Cup
- Slovenia at the FIFA World Cup
- South Africa at the FIFA World Cup
- Spain at the FIFA World Cup
