= 2002 FIFA World Cup broadcasting rights =

FIFA, through several companies, sold the rights for the broadcast of 2002 FIFA World Cup to the following broadcasters.

In some regions, this FIFA World Cup was the first to be broadcast in a 16:9 widescreen, high-definition format.

== Television ==
Country	Broadcaster(s)	Ref
Albania	TVSH	
Argentina	Canal 7, TyC, América 2, DirecTV	
Armenia	Armenia TV	
Australia	SBS, Nine Network	
Austria	ORF, Sat.1, Premiere	
Bangladesh	BTV	
Belgium	Dutch: VRT	
Belgium	French: RTBF	
Bolivia	Unitel, TVB, DirecTV	
Bosnia and Herzegovina	BHRT	
Brazil	TV Globo, SporTV, DirecTV	
Brunei	RTB	
Bulgaria	BNT	
Canada	CBC	
Chile	Canal 13, TVN, DirecTV	
China PR	CCTV	
Colombia	Caracol, RCN, DirecTV	
Costa Rica	Repretel	
Cuba	ICRT	
Croatia	HRT	
Cyprus	RIK	
Czech Republic	Czech Television	
Denmark	DR, TV 2, Canal Digital	
Ecuador	Teleamazonas, RTS	
Estonia	ETV	
Finland	Yle	
France	TF1	
Georgia	GPB	
Germany	ARD, ZDF, Sat.1, Premiere	
Greece	ERT	
Guatemala	Canal 3, Canal 7	
Honduras	TVC	
Hong Kong	ATV, TVB, Cable TV Hong Kong	
Hungary	MTV	
India	Doordarshan	
Indonesia	RCTI	
Iran	IRIB	
Ireland	RTÉ	
Israel	Sports Channel, IBA	
Italy	RAI	
Japan	NHK, TV Asahi, Nippon TV, SKY PerfecTV!	
Kenya	KTN, KBC	
South Korea	KBS, MBC, SBS	
Latvia	LTV, Channel 1	
Lithuania	BTV	
Macau	TDM	
Macedonia	MKTV	
Malaysia	RTM, TV3, NTV7, Astro	
Mexico	TV Azteca, Televisa, CNI Canal 40 and DirecTV	
Middle East and North Africa	ART	
Moldova	TRM	
Netherlands	NOS	
New Zealand	TVNZ, Sky	
Norway	NRK, TV2, Canal Digital	
Pakistan	PTV	
Panama	Channel 4	
Paraguay	Channel 50	
Peru	ATV	
Philippines	NBN, Net 25, SkyCable	
Poland	TVP, Polsat	
Portugal	RTP, SportTV	
Romania	TVR	
Russia	Channel One, VGTRK	
Singapore	Channel 5, StarHub Cable Vision	
Slovakia	STV	
Slovenia	RTV, Pro Plus	
South Africa	e.tv, SuperSport	
Spain	Antena 3, Vía Digital	
Sub-Saharan Africa	TVAfrica	
Sweden	SVT, TV4	
Switzerland	Sat.1, SRG SSR	
Taiwan	Era Television, CTS	
Thailand	Channel 9, Channel 11, ITV	
Turkey	TRT	
Ukraine	UT-1	
United Kingdom	BBC, ITV	
United States and territories: American Samoa; Guam; Northern Mariana Islands; Puerto Rico; U.S. Virgin Islands	English: ABC, ESPN and ESPN 2	
United States and territories: American Samoa; Guam; Northern Mariana Islands; Puerto Rico; U.S. Virgin Islands	Spanish: Univision	
Uruguay	Channel 50	
Venezuela	Venevisión, RCTV, Meridiano Televisión	
Vietnam	DatVietVAC, VTV, HTV	
FR Yugoslavia	RTS, RTK	
