= Teboho Mokoena (soccer, born 1974) =

South African soccer player

Personal information
- Full name: Teboho Patrick Mokoena
- Date of birth: 10 July 1974 (age 52)
- Place of birth: Thokoza, South Africa
- Height: 1.79 m (5 ft 10 in)
- Position: Midfielder

Senior career*
Years	Team	Apps	(Gls)
1996–1998	Dangerous Aces	25	(2)
1998–2001	Jomo Cosmos	73	(7)
2001–2002	FC St. Gallen	20	(1)
2002–2004	Jomo Cosmos	54	(1)
2004–2005	Mamelodi Sundowns	10	(1)
2005–2006	Jomo Cosmos	18	(1)
2006–2008	Bidvest Wits	50	(0)
2008–2010	Mpumalanga Black Aces	8	(0)

International career
2001–2004	South Africa	28	(5)
- * Club domestic league appearances and goals

Teboho Patrick Mokoena /ˌmɒkoʊˈɛnə/ (born 10 July 1974) is a South African former soccer player. He last played as a midfielder for Mpumalanga Black Aces F.C.

== Career ==
Teboho is resisting the temptation to give up on football by staying fit in the amateur ranks. It has been over two months since Bidvest Wits chose not to renew the 34-year-old's contract, and Mokoena states he still wants to maintain his fitness at a competitive level.

=== Playing career ===
- (South Africa) Dangerous Aces (1996–1998)
- (South Africa) Jomo Cosmos (1998–2001)
- (Switzerland) FC St. Gallen (2001–2002)
- (South Africa) Jomo Cosmos (2002–2004)
- (South Africa) Mamelodi Sundowns (2004–2005)
- (South Africa) Jomo Cosmos (2005–2006)
- (South Africa) Bidvest Wits (2006–2008)
- (South Africa) Mpumalanga Black Aces F.C. (2009–2010)

== International career ==
He has 28 caps and 5 goals for South Africa, and was a participant at the 2002 FIFA World Cup, scoring one goal against Paraguay in the group stage.

International goals for South Africa

Score and results list South Africa's goal tally first.

#	Date	Venue	Opponent	Score	Result	Competition
1.	20 May 2002	Mong Kok Stadium, Mong Kok, Hong Kong	Scotland	1–0	2–0	Friendly
2.	2 June 2002	Busan Asiad Main Stadium, Busan, South Korea	Paraguay	1–2	2–2	2002 FIFA World Cup
3.	24 August 2002	Peter Mokaba Stadium, Polokwane, South Africa	Eswatini	1–0	4–1	2002 COSAFA Cup
4.	24 August 2002	Peter Mokaba Stadium, Polokwane, South Africa	Eswatini	2–1	4–1	2002 COSAFA Cup
5.	6 July 2003	Prince Louis Rwagasore Stadium, Bujumbura, Burundi	Burundi	1–0	2–0	2004 African Cup of Nations qualifying
