= Byron Moreno =

Ecuadorian football referee

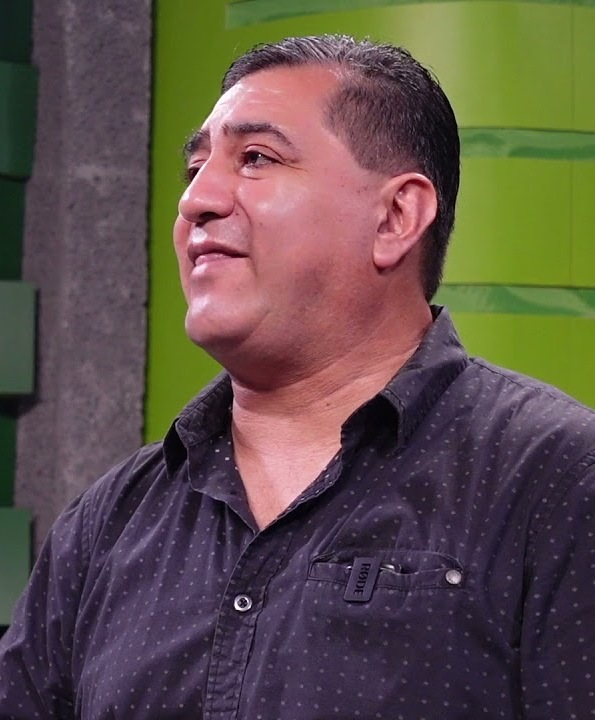
- Moreno in 2021
- Full name: Byron Aldemar Moreno Ruales
- Born: 23 November 1969 (age 56); Quito, Ecuador

Domestic
Years	League	Role
–2003	Serie A	Referee

International
Years	League	Role
1996–2003	FIFA listed	Referee

Byron Aldemar Moreno Ruales (born 23 November 1969) is an Ecuadorian former football referee and convicted drug trafficker who served in the FIFA World Cup as an International Referee from 1996 to 2003.

== Refereeing career ==
During the 2002 FIFA World Cup, Moreno refereed the round of 16 match between tournament favourites Italy and co-hosts South Korea on 18 June. Following Italy's elimination from the tournament after a 2–1 extra time loss, Moreno's performance was criticised for several decisions: he awarded South Korea a controversial penalty in the first half (which eventually failed to capitalise) and at the fourth minute of the second half he ignored a reaction foul by Taeyoung Kim, who elbowed Alessandro Del Piero in the face inside South Korea's box. In addition, in the first half of extra time Moreno showed a second yellow card to Francesco Totti for an alleged dive in South Korea's penalty area (the dispute being that Totti fell from Song Chong-gug's tackle instead), and he later disallowed a possible golden goal by Damiano Tommasi for offside.

In September 2002, while seeking election to the Quito City Council, Moreno was suspended for twenty matches and investigated by Ecuadorian football authorities. This came after he made timekeeping errors in a match he officiated between L.D.U. Quito and Barcelona S.C. FIFA also investigated him due to controversies "...in Japan, Italy and South America over the past few months".

In May 2003, in his third game back from suspension, Moreno was again suspended, this time for one match, after he sent off three players from visiting Deportivo Quito in a 1–1 draw with Deportivo Cuenca. He retired the following month, blaming low performance marks for his retirement.

== Legal trouble ==
Moreno was arrested on 21 September 2010 at John F. Kennedy International Airport in New York City while trying to smuggle in 6 kilograms (13 lb) of heroin, which was hidden in his underwear. In January 2011, he pleaded guilty to the charges in a New York courthouse, facing a possible ten years in prison. On 23 September 2011, Moreno was sentenced to 2 1/2 years in prison on the heroin smuggling charges. He was released from prison 26 months later and returned to Ecuador.
