= 2002 FIFA World Cup seeding =

Calculation of football teams before tournament

The draw for the 2002 FIFA World Cup took place on 1 December 2001 at the Exhibition and Convention Center in Busan, South Korea. FIFA General Secretary Michel Zen-Ruffinen presided over the draw, while the balls were drawn by Yves Rimet, grandson of Jules Rimet.

To calculate the seeding for the 2002 FIFA World Cup, FIFA used the FIFA World Rankings in combination with performances of national teams in the three previous World Cups. The formula is virtually identical with the one used for the 1998 FIFA World Cup seeding.

For the ranking part, points were allocated on the basis of 32 for the best achieving of the 32 qualifiers for 2002 FIFA World Cup in each of the three fields considered, down to one for the lowest ranking.

For the World Cup performance part, points were allocated as follows:

- Teams qualified for the knockout stages were ranked by their overall performance and received between 32 points (World Cup winner) and 17 points (the losing quarter finalist with the worst overall performance).
- Teams eliminated in the group stage were ranked by their performance. The top half received 9 points, the rest 8 points.

The seedings table uses these points obtained from the 1990 FIFA World Cup, 1994 FIFA World Cup and the 1998 FIFA World Cup averaged in a 1:2:3 ratio respectively, added to the average number of points derived from the World Rankings at three given dates (at ratio 1:1:1), December 1999, December 2000, and November 2001. All totals are rounded.

Seed	Country	1. FIFA World Cup Finals							2. FIFA World Rankings							Total Points
Seed	Country	Italy 1990 (16.7%)		USA 1994 (33.3%)		France 1998 (50%)		Avg. Points	Dec 1999 (33.3%)		Dec 2000 (33.3%)		Nov 2001 (33.3%)		Avg. Points	Total Points
Seed	Country	Rk	Pt.	Rk	Pt.	Rk	Pt.	Avg. Points	Rk	Pt.	Rk	Pt.	Rk	Pt.	Avg. Points	Total Points
1	Brazil	9	24	1	32	2	31	30	1	32	1	32	3	30	31	62
2	Argentina	2	31	10	23	6	27	26	6	28	3	30	2	31	30	56
3	Italy	3	30	2	31	5	28	29	14	23	4	29	6	28	27	56
4	Germany	1	32	5	28	7	26	28	5	29	11	25	11	24	26	54
5	France	–	0	–	0	1	32	16	3	31	2	31	1	32	31	47
6	Spain	10	23	8	25	17	9	17	4	30	7	27	7	27	28	45
7	Mexico	–	0	13	20	13	20	17	10	26	12	24	9	26	25	42
8	England	4	29	–	0	9	24	17	12	24	17	22	10	25	24	41
9	Croatia	–	0	–	0	3	30	15	9	27	18	21	19	19	22	37
10	Denmark	–	0	–	0	8	25	13	11	25	22	17.5	17	21	21	34
11	Paraguay	–	0	–	0	14	19	10	17	20	9	26	14	23	23	33
12	Sweden	21	8	3	30	–	0	11	16	21	22	17.5	16	22	20	32
13	United States	23	8	14	19	32	8	12	22	18	16	23	20	17.5	20	31
14	Belgium	11	22	11	22	19	9	16	33	13	27	15	20	17.5	15	31
15	Portugal	–	0	–	0	–	0	0	15	22	6	28	4	29	26	26
16	Republic of Ireland	8	25	16	17	–	0	10	35	12	31	13	18	20	15	25
17	Russia	17	9	18	9	–	0	5	18	19	21	19	22	16	18	23
18	Nigeria	–	0	9	24	12	21	19	76	3	52	5	40	4	4	23
19	Saudi Arabia	–	0	12	21	28	8	11	38	11	36	10	30	11	11	22
20	South Africa	–	0	–	0	24	9	5	30	16	20	20	34	8	15	19
21	Tunisia	–	0	–	0	26	8	4	31	15	26	16	28	12	14	18
22	Cameroon	7	26	22	8	25	8	11	58	6	39	8	38	5	6	17
23	Turkey	–	0	–	0	–	0	0	29	17	30	14	23	15	15	15
24	Uruguay	16	17	–	0	–	0	3	45	9	32	12	24	14	12	15
25	South Korea	22	8	20	9	30	8	8	51	8	40	7	43	3	6	14
26	Japan	–	0	–	0	31	8	4	57	7	38	9	35	7	8	12
27	Slovenia	–	0	–	0	–	0	0	40	10	35	11	27	13	11	11
28	Poland	–	0	–	0	–	0	0	32	14	43	6	33	9	10	10
29	Costa Rica	13	20	–	0	–	0	3	64	5	60	3	31	10	6	9
30	Ecuador	–	0	–	0	–	0	0	65	4	53	4	37	6	5	5
31	China	–	0	–	0	–	0	0	88	1	74	2	55	2	2	2
32	Senegal	–	0	–	0	–	0	0	79	2	88	1	67	1	1	1
Seed	Country	Rk	Pt.	Rk	Pt.	Rk	Pt.	Avg. Points	Rk	Pt.	Rk	Pt.	Rk	Pt.	Avg. Points	Total Points
Seed	Country	Italy 1990 (16.7%)		USA 1994 (33.3%)		France 1998 (50%)		Avg. Points	Dec 1999 (33.3%)		Dec 2000 (33.3%)		Nov 2001 (33.3%)		Avg. Points	Total Points
Seed	Country	1. FIFA World Cup Finals							2. FIFA World Rankings							Total Points

South Korea and Japan were seeded as hosts, France as defending champions. The other seeds were: Brazil, Argentina, Italy, Germany and Spain.
