= Aleš Čeh =

Slovenian footballer

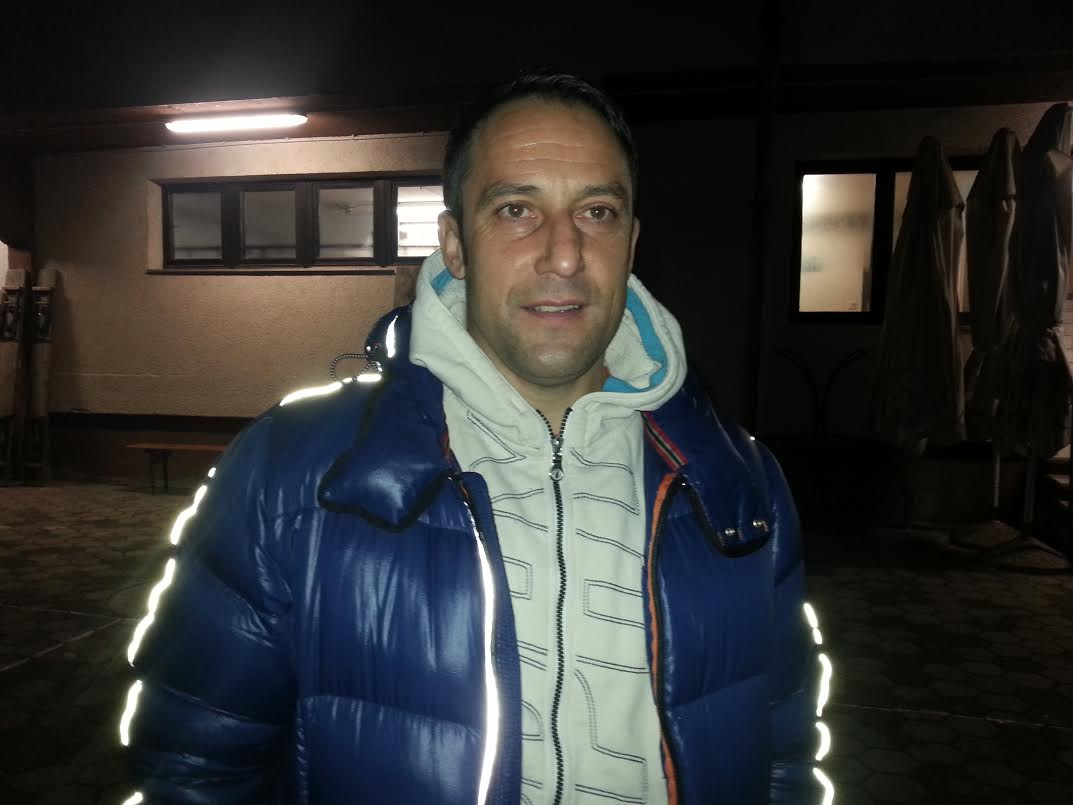

Personal information
- Date of birth: 7 April 1968 (age 58)
- Place of birth: Maribor, SFR Yugoslavia
- Height: 1.74 m (5 ft 9 in)
- Position: Defensive midfielder

Youth career
- Slovan

Senior career*
Years	Team	Apps	(Gls)
1988–1992	Olimpija	112	(2)
1992–2003	Grazer AK	287	(3)
2003–2004	Maribor	45	(0)
2005–2006	LASK	42	(1)
2006–2009	Olimpija Ljubljana		
Total		486	(6)

International career
1992–2002	Slovenia	74	(1)

Managerial career
- 2009–2010: Slovenia U16
- 2011–2012: Grazer AK
- 2012–2013: Rudar Velenje
- 2018: Slovenia U16/U17
- * Club domestic league appearances and goals

Aleš Čeh (born 7 April 1968) is a Slovenian retired footballer who played as a midfielder. He represented Slovenia at Euro 2000 and the 2002 FIFA World Cup.

== Club career ==
Čeh played for the youth team of Slovan, and later also for their city rivals Olimpija. In 1992, he transferred to the Austrian second division side Grazer AK. With his steady midfield-play, he helped the team back to the top flight in 1995. After winning the Austrian Cup and the Austrian Supercup in 2000 and 2002, he left GAK in summer 2003 and signed for Maribor until winter 2004, when he went back to Austria, this time to LASK Linz.

After that he moved back to Olimpija Ljubljana. He retired from football after the 2008–09 season and worked at the club initially as a youth coach and later as assistant manager to Dušan Kosič. In June 2011 he took up the position of manager at Grazer AK.

== International career ==
Čeh made his debut for Slovenia in a June 1992 friendly match away against Estonia. He earned a total of 74 caps for the national team, scoring 1 goal. He was a participant at UEFA Euro 2000 and the 2002 World Cup. His final international was during the latter tournament against Paraguay.

== Career statistics ==
=== International ===
Scores and results list Slovenia's goal tally first, score column indicates score after each Čeh goal.

List of international goals scored by Aleš Čeh
No.	Date	Venue	Opponent	Score	Result	Competition
1	6 December 1995	Estadio Héroe de Nacozari, Hermosillo, Mexico	Mexico	1–1	2–1	Friendly

== Honours ==
Olimpija

- Slovenian PrvaLiga: 1991–92

GAK

- ÖFB-Cup: 2000, 2002
- Austrian Supercup: 2000, 2002

Maribor

- Slovenian Cup: 2003–04
