= 2001–02 AC Perugia season =

Perugia
2001–02 season
- President: Luciano Gaucci
- Head coach: Serse Cosmi
- Stadium: Stadio Renato Curi
- Serie A: 8th
- Coppa Italia: Round of 16
- Top goalscorer: League: Fabio Bazzani (10); All: Fabio Bazzani (13)
- Average home league attendance: 10,456
Home colours

The 2001–02 season was AC Perugia Calcio's fourth consecutive season in top flight of the Italian football league, the Serie A, and the 97th as a football club.

== Competitions ==
=== Overall record ===
Competition	First match	Last match	Starting round	Final position	Record							
Competition	First match	Last match	Starting round	Final position	Pld	W	D	L	GF	GA	GD	Win %
Serie A	26 August 2001	5 May 2002	Matchday 1	8th	34	13	7	14	38	46	−8	38.24
Coppa Italia	9 September 2001	28 November 2001	Round of 32	Round of 16	4	1	2	1	7	7	+0	25.00
Total					38	14	9	15	45	53	−8	36.84

Source: Competitions

=== Serie A ===
==== League table ====
Pos	Team	Pld	W	D	L	GF	GA	GD	Pts	Qualification or relegation
6	Lazio	34	14	11	9	50	37	+13	53	Qualification to UEFA Cup first round
7	Bologna	34	15	7	12	40	40	0	52	Qualification to Intertoto Cup third round
8	Perugia	34	13	7	14	38	46	−8	46	Qualification to Intertoto Cup third round
9	Atalanta	34	12	9	13	41	50	−9	45	
10	Parma (Note: Parma gained entry to the 2002–03 UEFA Cup as the 2001–02 Coppa Italia champions.)	34	12	8	14	43	47	−4	44	Qualification to UEFA Cup first round

Source: 2001–02 Serie A, Soccerway
Rules for classification: 1) Points; 2) Head-to-head points; 3) Head-to-head goal difference; 4) Goal difference; 5) Goals scored; 6) Draw. (Note: Head-to-head record is used only after all the matches between the teams in question have been played).

==== Results summary ====
Overall								Home						Away					
Pld	W	D	L	GF	GA	GD	Pts	W	D	L	GF	GA	GD	W	D	L	GF	GA	GD
34	13	7	14	38	46	−8	46	10	4	3	24	15	+9	3	3	11	14	31	−17

Source: Serie A

==== Results by round ====
Round	1	2	3	4	5	6	7	8	9	10	11	12	13	14	15	16	17	18	19	20	21	22	23	24	25	26	27	28	29	30	31	32	33	34
Ground	A	H	A	H	H	A	H	A	H	A	H	A	A	H	A	H	A	H	A	H	A	A	H	A	H	A	H	A	H	H	A	H	A	H
Result	L	D	D	L	W	W	D	L	W	L	D	L	L	W	L	W	W	L	L	W	D	D	W	L	W	L	W	L	D	L	W	W	L	W
Position	17	15	16	17	14	14	14	14	10	12	14	15	16	14	15	11	9	9	12	11	11	12	10	11	8	10	8	9	9	11	10	8	10	8

Source: Serie A
A = Away; H = Home; W = Win; D = Draw; L = Loss
