= 2000–01 AC Perugia season =

Perugia
2000–01 season
- President: Luciano Gaucci
- Head coach: Serse Cosmi
- Stadium: Stadio Renato Curi
- Serie A: 11th
- Coppa Italia: Round of 32
- UEFA Intertoto Cup: Second round
- Top goalscorer: League: Marco Materazzi (12); All: Marco Materazzi (12)
Home colours

The 2000–01 season was AC Perugia's third consecutive season in top flight of the Italian football league, the Serie A, and the 96th as a football club. Win Draw Loss

== Competitions ==
=== Overall record ===
| Competition | First match | Last match | Starting round | Final position | Record | | | | | | | |
| Competition | First match | Last match | Starting round | Final position | Pld | W | D | L | GF | GA | GD | Win % |
|---|---|---|---|---|---|---|---|---|---|---|---|---|
| Serie A | 30 September 2000 | 17 June 2001 | Matchday 1 | 11th | 34 | 10 | 12 | 12 | 49 | 53 | −4 | 29.41 |
| Coppa Italia | 26 August 2000 | 6 September 2000 | Round of 32 | Round of 32 | 2 | 1 | 0 | 1 | 2 | 2 | +0 | 50.00 |
| Coppa Italia | 1 July 2000 | 8 July 2000 | Second round | Second round | 2 | 0 | 1 | 1 | 2 | 3 | −1 | 0.00 |
| Total | | | | | 38 | 11 | 13 | 14 | 53 | 58 | −5 | 28.95 |

Source: Competitions

=== Serie A ===
==== League table ====
| Pos | Team | Pld | W | D | L | GF | GA | GD | Pts | Qualification or relegation |
|---|---|---|---|---|---|---|---|---|---|---|
| 9 | Fiorentina (Note: Fiorentina gained entry to the 2001–02 UEFA Cup as the 2000–01 Coppa Italia champions.) | 34 | 10 | 13 | 11 | 53 | 52 | +1 | 43 | Qualification to UEFA Cup first round |
| 10 | Bologna | 34 | 11 | 10 | 13 | 49 | 53 | −4 | 43 | |
| 11 | Perugia | 34 | 10 | 12 | 12 | 49 | 53 | −4 | 42 | |
| 12 | Udinese | 34 | 11 | 5 | 18 | 49 | 59 | −10 | 38 | |
| 13 | Lecce | 34 | 8 | 13 | 13 | 40 | 54 | −14 | 37 (Note: Lecce finished ahead of Reggina and Hellas Verona on head-to-head points: Lecce: 10 pts, Reggina: 4 pts, Hellas Verona: 2 pts.) | |

Source: 2000–01 Serie A, Soccerway, RSSSF.com
Rules for classification: 1) Points; 2) Head-to-head points; 3) Head-to-head goal difference; 4) Goal difference; 5) Goals scored; 6) Draw. (Note: Head-to-head record is used only after all the matches between the teams in question have been played).

==== Results summary ====
| Overall | | | | | | | | Home | | | | | | Away | | | | | |
| Pld | W | D | L | GF | GA | GD | Pts | W | D | L | GF | GA | GD | W | D | L | GF | GA | GD |
|---|---|---|---|---|---|---|---|---|---|---|---|---|---|---|---|---|---|---|---|
| 34 | 10 | 12 | 12 | 49 | 53 | −4 | 42 | 6 | 7 | 4 | 26 | 21 | +5 | 4 | 5 | 8 | 23 | 32 | −9 |

Source: Serie A

==== Results by round ====
| Round | 1 | 2 | 3 | 4 | 5 | 6 | 7 | 8 | 9 | 10 | 11 | 12 | 13 | 14 | 15 | 16 | 17 | 18 | 19 | 20 | 21 | 22 | 23 | 24 | 25 | 26 | 27 | 28 | 29 | 30 | 31 | 32 | 33 | 34 |
|---|---|---|---|---|---|---|---|---|---|---|---|---|---|---|---|---|---|---|---|---|---|---|---|---|---|---|---|---|---|---|---|---|---|---|
| Ground | H | A | H | A | A | H | A | H | H | A | H | A | H | A | H | A | H | A | H | A | H | H | A | H | A | A | H | A | H | A | H | A | H | A |
| Result | D | L | W | L | W | D | L | L | D | D | W | W | W | L | L | W | W | D | L | L | W | D | D | L | L | D | D | W | W | D | D | L | D | L |
| Position | 11 | 16 | 11 | 13 | 9 | 10 | 12 | 13 | 14 | 13 | 11 | 11 | 8 | 8 | 11 | 9 | 6 | 6 | 8 | 11 | 6 | 8 | 9 | 9 | 11 | 10 | 10 | 10 | 9 | 9 | 10 | 10 | 10 | 11 |

Source: Serie A
A = Away; H = Home; W = Win; D = Draw; L = Loss

==== Matches ====
| 30 September 2000 1 | Perugia | 1–1 | Lecce | Perugia |
| | | | | Stadium: Stadio Renato Curi |

| 15 October 2000 2 | Lazio | 3–0 | Perugia |

| 22 October 2000 3 | Perugia | 3–1 | Parma | Perugia |
| | | | | Stadium: Stadio Renato Curi |

| 1 November 2000 4 | Vicenza | 1–0 | Perugia |

| 5 November 2000 5 | Fiorentina | 3–4 | Perugia |

| 12 November 2000 6 | Perugia | 1–1 | Napoli | Perugia |
| | | | | Stadium: Stadio Renato Curi |

| 19 November 2000 7 | Internazionale | 2–1 | Perugia |

| 26 November 2000 8 | Perugia | 1–3 | Bologna | Perugia |
| | | | | Stadium: Stadio Renato Curi |

| 3 December 2000 9 | Perugia | 0–0 | Roma | Perugia |
| | | | | Stadium: Stadio Renato Curi |

| 10 December 2000 10 | Atalanta | 0–0 | Perugia |

| 17 December 2000 11 | Perugia | 4–1 | Bari | Perugia |
| | | | | Stadium: Stadio Renato Curi |

| 23 December 2000 12 | Milan | 1–2 | Perugia | Milan |
| | | | | Stadium: San Siro |

| 7 January 2001 13 | Perugia | 3–1 | Udinese | Perugia |
| | | | | Stadium: Stadio Renato Curi |

| 14 January 2001 14 | Brescia | 1–0 | Perugia | Brescia |

| 21 January 2001 15 | Perugia | 0–1 | Juventus | Perugia |
| | | | | Stadium: Stadio Renato Curi |

| 28 January 2001 16 | Reggina | 0–2 | Perugia | Reggio Calabria |

| 4 February 2001 17 | Perugia | 1–0 | Hellas Verona | Perugia |
| | | | | Stadium: Stadio Renato Curi |

| 11 February 2001 18 | Lecce | 2–2 | Perugia | Lecce |

| 18 February 2001 19 | Perugia | 0–1 | Lazio | Perugia |
| | | | | Stadium: Stadio Renato Curi |

| 25 February 2001 20 | Parma | 5–0 | Perugia |

| 4 March 2001 21 | Perugia | 1–0 | Vicenza | Perugia |
| | | | | Stadium: Stadio Renato Curi |

| 11 March 2001 22 | Perugia | 2–2 | Fiorentina | Perugia |
| | | | | Stadium: Stadio Renato Curi |

| 18 March 2001 23 | Napoli | 0–0 | Perugia |

| 1 April 2001 24 | Perugia | 2–3 | Internazionale | Perugia |
| | | | | Stadium: Stadio Renato Curi |

| 8 April 2001 25 | Bologna | 3–2 | Perugia |

| 15 April 2001 26 | Roma | 2–2 | Perugia |

| 22 April 2001 27 | Perugia | 2–2 | Atalanta | Perugia |
| | | | | Stadium: Stadio Renato Curi |

| 29 April 2001 28 | Bari | 3–4 | Perugia |

| 6 May 2001 29 | Perugia | 2–1 | Milan | Perugia |
| | | | | Stadium: Stadio Renato Curi |

| 13 May 2001 30 | Udinese | 3–3 | Perugia |

| 20 May 2001 31 | Perugia | 2–2 | Brescia | Perugia |
| | | | | Stadium: Stadio Renato Curi |

| 27 May 2001 32 | Juventus | 1–0 | Perugia |

| 10 June 2001 33 | Perugia | 1–1 | Reggina | Perugia |
| | | | | Stadium: Stadio Renato Curi |

| 17 June 2001 34 | Hellas Verona | 2–1 | Perugia |

=== Coppa Italia ===
==== Round of 32 ====
| 26 August 2000 First leg | Salernitana | 1–0 | Perugia | Salerno |
| | | | | Stadium: Stadio Arechi |

| 6 September 2000 Second leg | Perugia | 2–1 (2–2a agg.) | Salernitana | Perugia |
| | | | | Stadium: Stadio Renato Curi |

=== UEFA Intertoto Cup ===
==== Second round ====
| 1 July 2000 First leg | Perugia (Italy) | 1–2 | (Belgium) Standard Liège | Monza, Italy |
| | Calori 52' | | Lukunku 35'; Thijs 55' | Stadium: Stadio Brianteo |

| 8 July 2000 Second leg | Standard Liège (Belgium) | 1–1 (3–2 agg.) | (Italy) Perugia | Liège, Belgium |
| | Mornar 54' | | Alenichev 29' (pen.) | Stadium: Stade Sclessin |
