= 2002 FIFA World Cup =

Association football tournament in South Korea and Japan

2002 FIFA 월드컵 한국/일본 (Korean) 2002 FIFAワールドカップ 韓国/日本 (Japanese)

Tournament details
- Host countries: South Korea; Japan
- Dates: 31 May – 30 June
- Teams: 32 (from 5 confederations)
- Venues: 20 (in 20 host cities)

Final positions
- Champions: Brazil (5th title)
- Runners-up: Germany
- Third place: Turkey
- Fourth place: South Korea

Tournament statistics
- Matches played: 64
- Goals scored: 161 (2.52 per match)
- Attendance: 2,705,197 (42,269 per match)
- Top scorer: (Brazil) Ronaldo (8 goals)
- Best player: (Germany) Oliver Kahn
- Best young player: (United States) Landon Donovan
- Best goalkeeper: (Germany) Oliver Kahn
- Fair play award: Belgium

The 2002 FIFA World Cup (Korean: 2002 FIFA 월드컵 한국/일본; Japanese: 2002 FIFAワールドカップ 韓国/日本) also branded as Korea Japan 2002, was the 17th FIFA World Cup, the quadrennial football world championship for men's national teams organized by FIFA. It was held from 31 May to 30 June 2002 at sites in South Korea and Japan, with its final match hosted by Japan at International Stadium in Yokohama.

A field of 32 teams qualified for this World Cup, which was the first to be held in Asia, the first to be held outside of the Americas or Europe, as well as the first to be hosted by more than one nation. Four teams (China, Ecuador, Senegal, and Slovenia) made their World Cup debuts, with Senegal being the only debutant to advance from the Group Stages and make it to the quarter-finals.

The tournament had several upsets and surprise results, which included the defending champions France being eliminated in the group stage after earning a single point without scoring a goal, and second favourites Argentina also being eliminated in the group stage. South Korea managed to reach the semi-finals, beating Poland, Portugal, Italy and Spain en route. They became the first team from outside of the UEFA, CONMEBOL, and CONCACAF regions to reach the semi-finals of the World Cup. Along with South Korea, Turkey made its first appearance in the semi-finals as well. Brazil ultimately defeated Germany 2–0 in the finals, making them the only country to have won the World Cup five times. In the match for third place against South Korea, Turkey won 3–2, taking third place in only their second ever FIFA World Cup, and scored the fastest goal in the FIFA World Cup history (10.8 seconds after kick-off).

The 2002 World Cup was the last one to use the golden goal rule and the last one to use the same ball for all matches. Starting in 2006 and continuing to the present, a ball with the same technical specifications but different colors has been used in the final. It was also the last World Cup in which the defending champions automatically qualified.

== Host selection ==
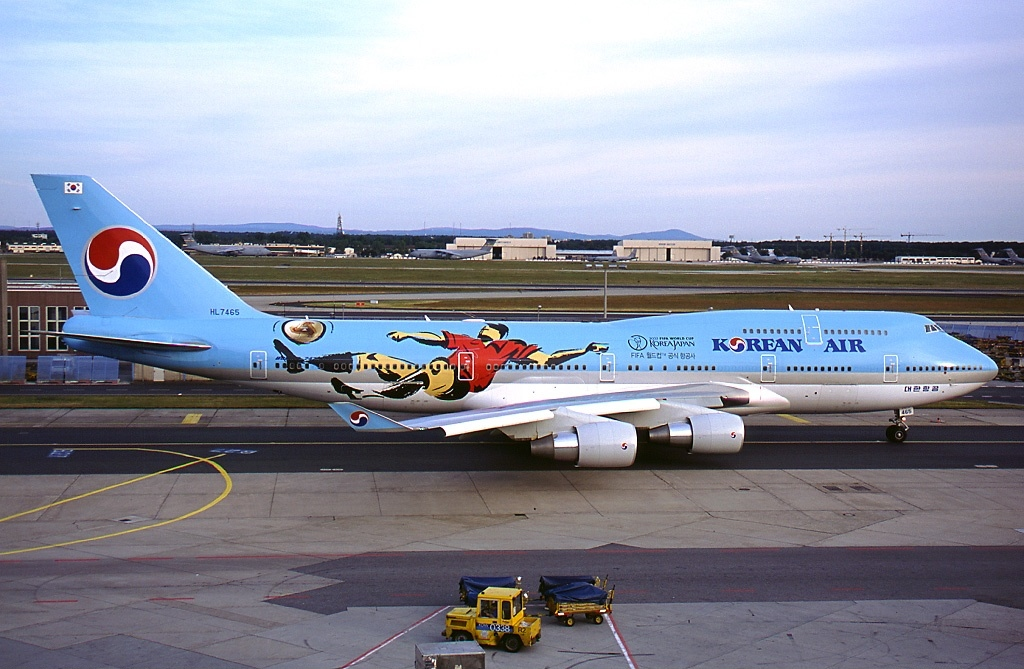
Korean Air Boeing 747 adorned with 2002 World Cup livery marking South Korea as co-hosts

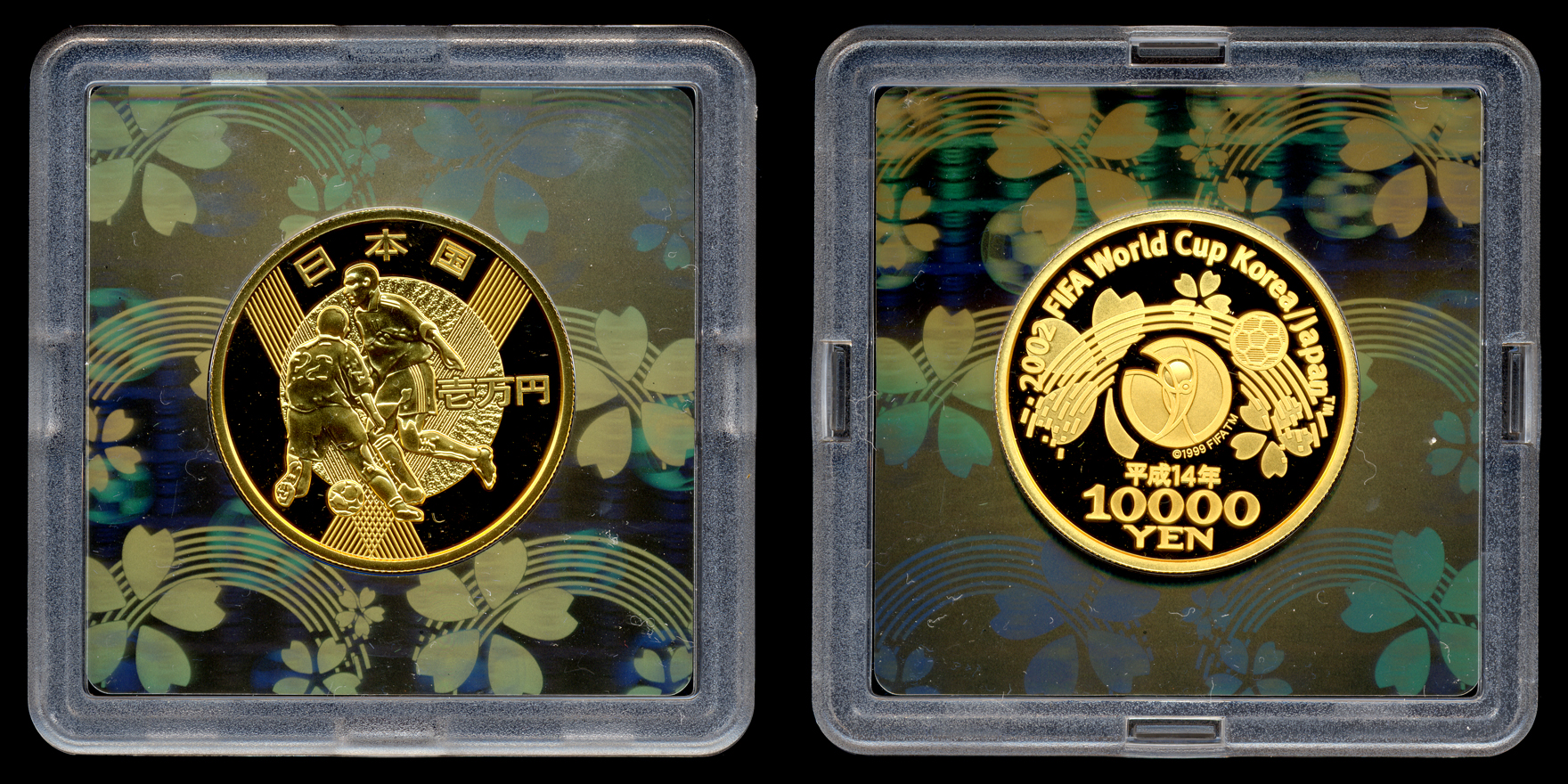
Japanese 10,000 yen coin for the 2002 FIFA World Cup

South Korea and Japan were selected as hosts by FIFA on 31 May 1996.

Initially, South Korea, Japan and Mexico presented three rival bids. South Korea's entry into the race was seen by some as a response to the bid of political and sporting rival Japan. FIFA leaders were split on whom to favor as host as politics within the world governing body held sway. With Mexico regarded as a long shot, the battle to host the tournament came down to South Korea and Japan. The two Asian rivals went on a massive and expensive PR blitz around the world, prompting Sultan Ahmad Shah, the head of the Asian Football Confederation, to step in. FIFA boss João Havelange had long backed the Japanese bid, but his rival in FIFA, UEFA chief Lennart Johansson, sought to undermine Havelange's plans. UEFA and the AFC viewed co-hosting between the two Asian rivals as the best option. South Korea and Japan were finally faced with a choice of having no World Cup or a shared World Cup and they reluctantly chose to go along with co-hosting. South Korea and Japan were chosen unanimously as co-hosts in preference to Mexico.

This was the first World Cup to be hosted by more than one country, the second being the 2026 World Cup hosted by the United States, Mexico, and Canada. This is also the first ever World Cup to be hosted in Asia, the other being the 2022 World Cup hosted by Qatar twenty years later and the first World Cup to be held outside of Europe and the Americas.

The general secretary of South Korea's bidding committee, Song Young-shik, stated that FIFA was interested in staging some matches in North Korea in order to aid Korean reunification, but it was ruled out. Though co-hosting the World Cup allowed Japan and South Korea to collaborate, the event did not significantly alter relations between the two countries, which have historically been strained. Even so, the World Cup promoted a global vision of cooperation between Japan and South Korea.

After being prevented from hosting along with South Korea, North Korea decided to host their own sports event, the Arirang Mass Games, at the same time as the World Cup. This is not unlike their course of action during the 1988 Seoul Olympics, where they decided to host the 13th World Festival of Youth and Students simultaneously.

At the time the decision was made, Japan had never qualified for a World Cup tournament (although the Japanese did subsequently qualify for the 1998 competition). The only other countries to have been awarded a World Cup without previously having competed in a final tournament are Italy in 1934 and Qatar in 2022 (Uruguay hosted the first World Cup in 1930 so there was no prior tournament; they were defending Olympic champions from 1928).

== Qualification ==
199 teams attempted to qualify for the 2002 World Cup. The qualification process began with the preliminary draw held in Tokyo on 7 December 1999. Defending champions France and co-hosts South Korea and Japan qualified automatically and did not have to play any qualification matches. This was the final World Cup in which the defending champions qualified automatically and played the opening match.

14 places were contested by UEFA teams (Europe), five by CAF teams (Africa), four by CONMEBOL teams (South America), four by AFC teams (Asia) and three by CONCACAF teams (North and Central America and the Caribbean). The remaining two places were decided by playoffs between AFC and UEFA and between CONMEBOL and OFC (Oceania). Four nations qualified for the finals for the first time: China, Ecuador, Senegal, and Slovenia.

Turkey qualified for the first time since 1954, Poland and Portugal both qualified for the first time since 1986, and Costa Rica and Uruguay qualified for the first time since 1990. Sweden, Russia, and the Republic of Ireland also returned after missing the 1998 World Cup. South Korea became the first nation from outside Europe or the Americas to appear in five successive finals tournaments.

All seven previous World Cup-winning nations (Argentina, Brazil, England, France, Germany, Italy, and Uruguay) qualified, which broke the record of most previous champions at a tournament before the record was broken again in 2014 with the addition of Spain (who won the 2010 tournament).

The highest-ranked team that did not qualify was the reigning Copa América champion Colombia (ranked 4th), while the lowest-ranked team that did qualify was China (ranked 50th).

=== List of qualified teams ===
The following 32 teams, shown with final pre-tournament rankings, qualified for the final tournament:

AFC (4)

- China (50) (debut)
- Japan (32) (co-hosts)
- Saudi Arabia (34)
- South Korea (40) (co-hosts)

CAF (5)

- Cameroon (17)
- Nigeria (27)
- Senegal (42) (debut)
- South Africa (37)
- Tunisia (31)

OFC (0)

- None qualified

CONCACAF (3)

- Costa Rica (29)
- Mexico (7)
- United States (13)

CONMEBOL (5)

- Argentina (3)
- Brazil (2)
- Ecuador (36) (debut)
- Paraguay (18)
- Uruguay (24)

UEFA (15)

- Belgium (23)
- Croatia (21)
- Denmark (20)
- England (12)
- France (holders) (1)
- Germany (11)
- Italy (6)
- Poland (38)
- Portugal (5)
- Republic of Ireland (15)
- Russia (28)
- Slovenia (25) (debut)
- Spain (8)
- Sweden (19)
- Turkey (22)

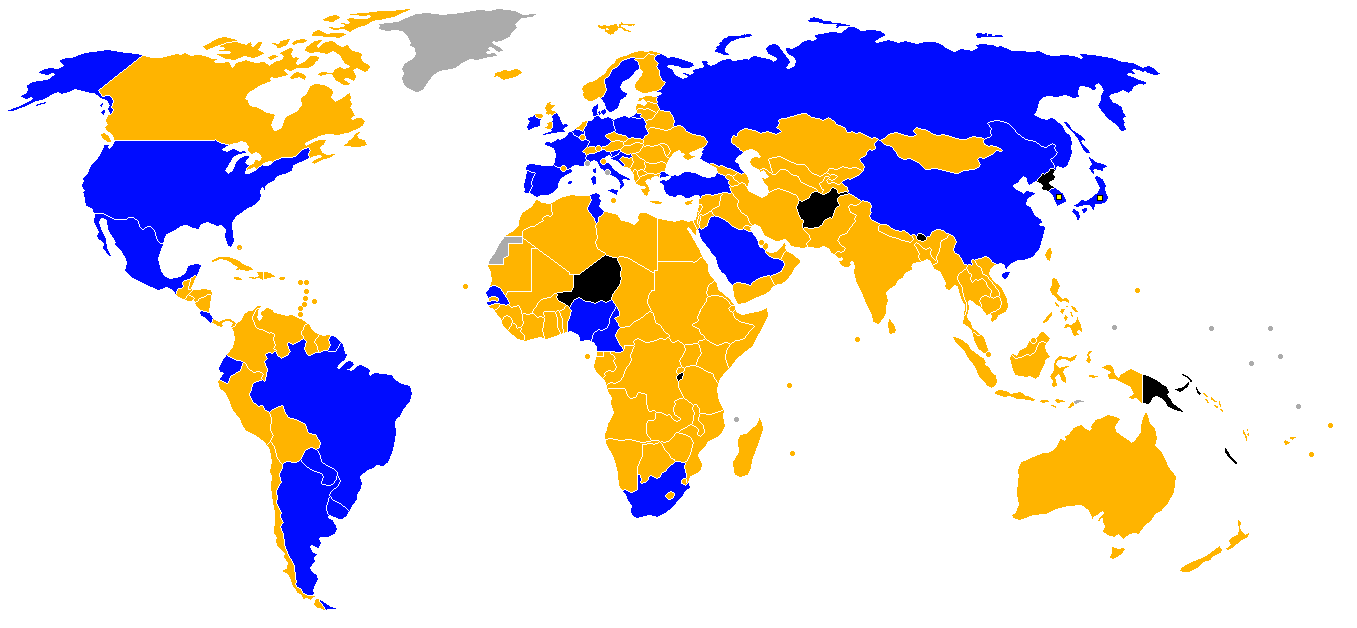
Countries qualified for the World Cup Country did not qualify Countries that did not enter the World Cup Country not a FIFA member

== Venues ==
20 stadia were used for this tournament, the highest number for any FIFA World Cup at that point; South Korea and Japan each provided 10 stadiums, the vast majority of them newly built for the tournament. Groups A–D played all their matches in South Korea and Groups E–H played all their matches in Japan. The stadiums in Daegu, Suwon, Yokohama, and Saitama all hosted 4 matches each, while the other 16 stadiums hosted 3 matches each. Notably, no matches were played in Tokyo, making it the second capital of a host country not to have a World Cup venue after Bonn of West Germany in 1974; however, the cities of Saitama and Yokohama which are part of the Greater Tokyo Area did host matches. (Note: Some say Bonn, which did not host a match for the 1974 World Cup, was only the de facto seat of government of host West Germany or was temporary capital but not its official de jure capital, which was Berlin. However, Bonn was the official capital of West Germany, the host country. Matches played in Berlin, the traditional capital of a unified Germany, were played in West Berlin, which was part of West Germany at the time.)

- A dagger (†) denotes an indoor stadium.

South Korea
Daegu	Seoul	Busan	Incheon	Ulsan
Daegu Stadium	Seoul World Cup Stadium	Busan Asiad Stadium	Incheon Munhak Stadium	Ulsan Munsu Football Stadium
Capacity: 68,014 (Note: The average attendance was 53,747)	Capacity: 63,961 (Note: The average attendance was 57,141)	Capacity: 55,982 (Note: The average attendance was 37,412)	Capacity: 52,179 (Note: The average attendance was 46,879)	Capacity: 43,550 (Note: The average attendance was 33,779)
Suwon	Gwangju	Jeonju	Seogwipo	Daejeon
Suwon World Cup Stadium	Gwangju World Cup Stadium	Jeonju World Cup Stadium	Jeju World Cup Stadium	Daejeon World Cup Stadium
Capacity: 43,188 (Note: The average attendance was 37,109)	Capacity: 42,880 (Note: The average attendance was 32,643)	Capacity: 42,391 (Note: The average attendance was 30,460)	Capacity: 42,256 (Note: The average attendance was 30,701)	Capacity: 40,407 (Note: The average attendance was 32,031)
South Korea			Japan	
Japan
Yokohama	Saitama	Shizuoka (Fukuroi, Shizuoka)	Osaka	Miyagi (Rifu, Miyagi)
Nissan Stadium	Saitama Stadium	Shizuoka Stadium ECOPA	Nagai Stadium	Miyagi Stadium
Capacity: 72,327 (Note: The average attendance was 66,580)	Capacity: 63,000 (Note: The average attendance was 56,073)	Capacity: 50,600 (Note: The average attendance was 47,054)	Capacity: 50,000 (Note: The average attendance was 44,770)	Capacity: 49,000 (Note: The average attendance was 45,684)
Ōita	Niigata	Kashima	Kobe	Sapporo
Crasus Dome Oita†	Denka Big Swan Stadium	Kashima Stadium	Noevir Stadium Kobe	Sapporo Dome†
Capacity: 43,000 (Note: The average attendance was 39,579)	Capacity: 42,300 (Note: The average attendance was 35,500)	Capacity: 42,000 (Note: The average attendance was 35,459)	Capacity: 42,000 (Note: The average attendance was 35,864)	Capacity: 42,000 (Note: The average attendance was 33,075)

== Match officials ==
List of match officials by confederation and country

Referees
AFC

- Lu Jun (China)
- Toru Kamikawa (Japan)
- Saad Mane (Kuwait)
- Kim Young-joo (South Korea)
- Ali Bujsaim (United Arab Emirates)

CAF

- Coffi Codjia (Benin)
- Gamal Al-Ghandour (Egypt)
- Mohamed Guezzaz (Morocco)
- Falla N'Doye (Senegal)
- Mourad Daami (Tunisia)

CONCACAF

- William Mattus (Costa Rica)
- Carlos Batres (Guatemala)
- Peter Prendergast (Jamaica)
- Felipe Ramos (Mexico)
- Brian Hall (United States)

CONMEBOL

- Ángel Sánchez (Argentina)
- René Ortubé (Bolivia)
- Carlos Simon (Brazil)
- Óscar Ruiz (Colombia)
- Byron Moreno (Ecuador)
- Ubaldo Aquino (Paraguay)

OFC

- Mark Shield (Australia)

UEFA

- Kim Milton Nielsen (Denmark)
- Graham Poll (England)
- Gilles Veissière (France)
- Markus Merk (Germany)
- Kyros Vassaras (Greece)
- Pierluigi Collina (Italy)
- Jan Wegereef (Netherlands)
- Terje Hauge (Norway)
- Vítor Melo Pereira (Portugal)
- Hugh Dallas (Scotland)
- Ľuboš Micheľ (Slovakia)
- Antonio López Nieto (Spain)
- Anders Frisk (Sweden)
- Urs Meier (Switzerland)

Assistant referees
AFC

- Komaleeswaran Sankar (India)
- Awni Hassaouneh (Jordan)
- Haidar Koleit (Lebanon)
- Mat Lazim Awang Hamat (Malaysia)
- Mohamed Saeed (Maldives)
- Ali Al-Traifi (Saudi Arabia)
- Visva Krishnan (Singapore)

CAF

- Wagih Farag (Egypt)
- Dramane Dante (Mali)
- Taoufik Adjengui (Tunisia)
- Ali Tomusange (Uganda)
- Brighton Mudzamiri (Zimbabwe)

CONCACAF

- Curtis Charles (Antigua and Barbuda)
- Héctor Vergara (Canada)
- Vladimir Fernández (El Salvador)
- Michael Ragoonath (Trinidad and Tobago)

CONMEBOL

- Jorge Rattalino (Argentina)
- Jorge Oliveira (Brazil)
- Bomer Fierro (Ecuador)
- Miguel Giacomuzzi (Paraguay)

OFC

- Paul Smith (New Zealand)
- Elise Doriri (Vanuatu)

UEFA

- Egon Bereuter (Austria)
- Yury Dupanov (Belarus)
- Roland Van Nylen (Belgium)
- Evžen Amler (Czech Republic)
- Jens Larsen (Denmark)
- Philip Sharp (England)
- Frédéric Arnault (France)
- Heiner Müller (Germany)
- Ferenc Székely (Hungary)
- Jaap Pool (Netherlands)
- Maciej Wierzbowski (Poland)
- Carlos Matos (Portugal)
- Igor Šramka (Slovakia)
- Leif Lindberg (Sweden)

There was much controversy over the refereeing in the tournament. Decisions in the match between Italy and South Korea resulted in 400,000 complaints, and featured in ESPN's 10 most fabled World Cup controversies. The match between Spain and South Korea featured two controversially disallowed Spanish goals, which Iván Helguera referred to as "a robbery" and led to Spanish press brandishing the officials "thieves of dreams", though FIFA dismissed the incident as human error.

== Squads ==
This was the first World Cup that featured squads of 23 players, an increase from 22 previously. Of the 23 players, three had to be goalkeepers.

== Draw ==
The FIFA Organising Committee announced the eight seeded teams on 28 November 2001. The historic tradition to seed the hosts (South Korea and Japan) and holders (France) was upheld while the remaining five seeds were granted to the other five of the top six teams—ranked by their results in the last three FIFA World Cups (ratio 3:2:1) and their FIFA World Ranking position in the last month of the past three years (equal ratio).

For the draw, the 32 teams were allocated into four pots; the eight top-seeded teams, were allocated in pot 1 and would be drawn/selected into the first position of the eight groups playing in the group stage. The remaining 24 unseeded teams, were allocated into three pots based on geographical sections, with the: 11 European teams in pot 2; two Asian teams and three South American teams in pot 3; three North American teams and five African teams in pot 4.

The general principle was to draw one team from each pot into the eight groups, although with special combined procedures for pot 2 and pot 3, due to comprising more/less than eight teams – but sixteen teams in total. At the same time, the draw also needed to respect the geographical limitation, that each group cannot feature more than one team from each confederation, except for the European teams where the limitation was maximum two per group. Finally, special limitations were also stipulated to evenly distribute the presence of teams from each confederation between the groups playing respectively in Korea (group A-D) and Japan (group E-H); however, for political considerations, China could only be drawn for one of the groups playing in Korea.

Pot 1 Top-seeded teams (DC + hosts + top 5 seeds)	Pot 2 Europe (UEFA)	Pot 3 Asia & South America (AFC & CONMEBOL)	Pot 4 Africa & North America (CAF & CONCACAF)
France (1998 winner, group A1); South Korea (co-hosts, group D1); Japan (co-hosts, group H1); Brazil (1); Argentina (2); Italy (3); Germany (4); Spain (6)	Belgium; Croatia; Denmark; England; Poland; Portugal; Republic of Ireland; Russia; Slovenia; Sweden; Turkey	China; Ecuador; Paraguay; Saudi Arabia; Uruguay	Cameroon; Costa Rica; Mexico; Nigeria; Senegal; South Africa; Tunisia; United States

- The draw took place at the Busan Exhibition and Convention Center in South Korea and was televised live on 1 December 2001.

The FIFA Organising Committee decided ahead of the draw to place the defending champions (France) in Group A while the co-hosts South Korea and Japan were placed in Group D and Group H respectively. The procedure for the draw comprised the following six steps:

1. Pot 1 was used to draw, in alphabetical group order, the remaining five top-seeded teams for the first position of groups B, C, E, F and G; while respecting the restriction that one of the two South American seeds (Brazil and Argentina) had to play in a group played in South Korea (B/C) and the other had to play in a group played in Japan (E/F/G).
2. Pot 2 was used to draw one European team to each of the eight groups (drawing unrestricted in alphabetical order from A to H).
3. As per the FIFA rule of only allowing a maximum of two European teams in each group, the remaining three European teams from Pot 2 were subject to a second draw, to be put in either of the four groups containing a top-seeded South American team or Asian team. This was done by first drawing the European team from Pot 2, and then drawing which seeded opponent the European team should be paired with, from a special bowl with four blue balls containing the names of Brazil, Argentina, Japan and South Korea.
4. Pot 3 was used to draw one team to each of the five groups with an empty third slot (drawing in alphabetical order from A to H); while respecting the geographical restrictions, that:
  1. None of the unseeded South American teams (Ecuador, Paraguay, Uruguay) from pot 3 could be drawn into a group with a seeded South American team (Brazil and Argentina).
  2. None of the unseeded Asian teams (Saudi Arabia and China) from pot 3 could be drawn into a group with a seeded Asian team (South Korea and Japan in Group D and H); along with the overall rule that China had to play in South Korea (meaning either group A, B or C) and that Saudi Arabia had to play in Japan (meaning either group E, F or G).
5. Pot 4 was used to draw one team to each of the eight groups (drawing in alphabetical order from A to H); while respecting the restrictions that:
  1. A minimum of one North American team and minimum of two African teams should be drawn to a group located in South Korea (Group A/B/C/D)
  2. A minimum of one North American team and minimum of two African teams should be drawn to a group located in Japan (Group E/F/G/H)
6. To decide the match schedules, the exact group position number for the un-seeded teams in each group (2, 3 or 4), were also drawn immediately from eight special group bowls, after each respective team had been drawn from pot 2, 3 and 4.

Besides drawing the teams, the event also featured American vocalist Anastacia giving a debut public performance of the official song of the World Cup, "Boom". The draw was conducted by FIFA general secretary Michel Zen-Ruffinen, and many celebrities helped with the draw such as former players Pelé, Johan Cruyff, Michel Platini, Enrique Borja, and Roger Milla, players of the time like Hong Myung-bo and Masami Ihara, women's football player Sun Wen, women's football referee Im Eun-ju, mountain climber Park Young-seok, actress Song Hye-kyo, and chess player Cho Hoon-hyun.

=== Draw results and group fixtures ===
The draw resulted in the following eight groups:

Group A (Korea)
Pos	Team
A1	France
A2	Senegal
A3	Uruguay
A4	Denmark

Group B (Korea)
Pos	Team
B1	Spain
B2	Slovenia
B3	Paraguay
B4	South Africa

Group C (Korea)
Pos	Team
C1	Brazil
C2	Turkey
C3	China
C4	Costa Rica

Group D (Korea)
Pos	Team
D1	South Korea
D2	Poland
D3	United States
D4	Portugal

Group E (Japan)
Pos	Team
E1	Germany
E2	Saudi Arabia
E3	Republic of Ireland
E4	Cameroon

Group F (Japan)
Pos	Team
F1	Argentina
F2	Nigeria
F3	England
F4	Sweden

Group G (Japan)
Pos	Team
G1	Italy
G2	Ecuador
G3	Croatia
G4	Mexico

Group H (Japan)
Pos	Team
H1	Japan
H2	Belgium
H3	Russia
H4	Tunisia

In each group, the teams played three matches, one against each of the other teams. Victories were granted 3 points, while a draw was equal to 1 point. After completion of the group stage, the best two teams of each group advanced to the Round of 16 in the knockout stage, in a way so all group winners started out meeting a runner-up from one of the other groups. This format was identical with the tournament structure being used in 1998. A total of 64 games were played, including the final and a match for third place between the two semi-final losers.

Group F was considered the group of death as it brought together Argentina, England, Nigeria, and Sweden.

The fixtures for the group stage were decided based on the draw results, as follows:

Group stage schedule
Matchday	Dates	Matches
Matchday 1	31 May – 5 June 2002	1 v 2, 3 v 4
Matchday 2	5–10 June 2002	1 v 3, 4 v 2
Matchday 3	11–14 June 2002	4 v 1, 2 v 3

== Group stage ==
All times are Korea Standard Time and Japan Standard Time (UTC+9)

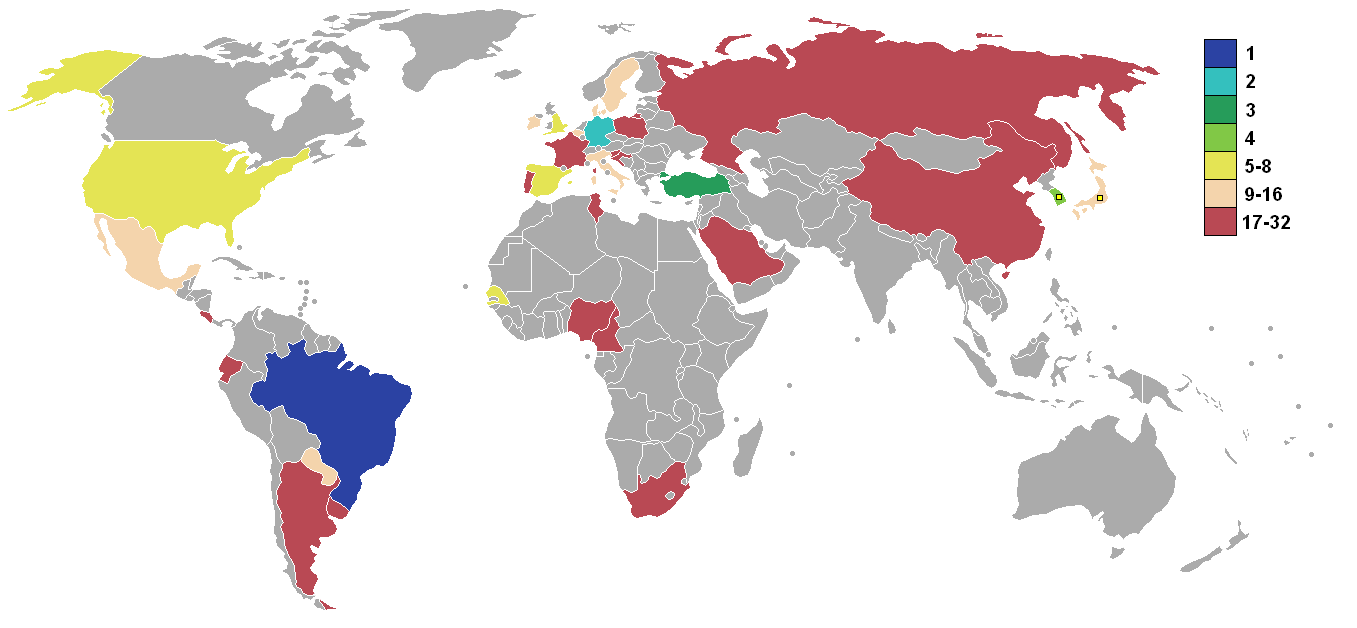
Champion Runner-up Third place Fourth place Quarter-finals Round of 16 Group stage

Groups A, B, C and D based in South Korea. Groups E, F, G and H based in Japan.

In the following tables:

- Pld = total games played
- W = total games won
- D = total games drawn (tied)
- L = total games lost
- GF = total goals scored (goals for)
- GA = total goals conceded (goals against)
- GD = goal difference (GF−GA)
- Pts = total points accumulated

The teams in the group play were ranked upon

- Points
- Greatest total goal difference in the three group matches
- Greatest number of goals scored in the three group matches
- Most points earned in matches against other teams in the tie
- Greatest goal difference in matches against other teams in the tie
- Greatest number of goals scored in matches against other teams in the tie
- Drawing of lots

In the original version of the rules for the final tournament, the ranking criteria were in a different order, with head-to-head results taking precedence over total goal difference. The rules were changed to the above in advance of the tournament, but older versions were still available on the FIFA and UEFA websites, causing some confusion among those trying to identify the correct criteria.

=== Group A ===
Pos	Team	Pld	W	D	L	GF	GA	GD	Pts	Qualification
1	Denmark	3	2	1	0	5	2	+3	7	Advance to knockout stage
2	Senegal	3	1	2	0	5	4	+1	5	Advance to knockout stage
3	Uruguay	3	0	2	1	4	5	−1	2	
4	France	3	0	1	2	0	3	−3	1	

Source: FIFA

31 May 2002
France	0–1	Senegal	Seoul World Cup Stadium, Seoul
1 June 2002
Uruguay	1–2	Denmark	Munsu Cup Stadium, Ulsan
6 June 2002
Denmark	1–1	Senegal	Daegu World Cup Stadium, Daegu
France	0–0	Uruguay	Busan Asiad Main Stadium, Busan
11 June 2002
Denmark	2–0	France	Incheon World Cup Stadium, Incheon
Senegal	3–3	Uruguay	Suwon World Cup Stadium, Suwon

=== Group B ===
Pos	Team	Pld	W	D	L	GF	GA	GD	Pts	Qualification
1	Spain	3	3	0	0	9	4	+5	9	Advance to knockout stage
2	Paraguay	3	1	1	1	6	6	0	4	Advance to knockout stage
3	South Africa	3	1	1	1	5	5	0	4	
4	Slovenia	3	0	0	3	2	7	−5	0	

Source: FIFA

2 June 2002
Paraguay	2–2	South Africa	Busan Asiad Main Stadium, Busan
Spain	3–1	Slovenia	Gwangju World Cup Stadium, Gwangju
7 June 2002
Spain	3–1	Paraguay	Jeonju World Cup Stadium, Jeonju
8 June 2002
South Africa	1–0	Slovenia	Daegu World Cup Stadium, Daegu
12 June 2002
South Africa	2–3	Spain	Daejeon World Cup Stadium, Daejeon
Slovenia	1–3	Paraguay	Jeju World Cup Stadium, Seogwipo

=== Group C ===
Pos	Team	Pld	W	D	L	GF	GA	GD	Pts	Qualification
1	Brazil	3	3	0	0	11	3	+8	9	Advance to knockout stage
2	Turkey	3	1	1	1	5	3	+2	4	Advance to knockout stage
3	Costa Rica	3	1	1	1	5	6	−1	4	
4	China	3	0	0	3	0	9	−9	0	

Source: FIFA

3 June 2002
Brazil	2–1	Turkey	Munsu Football Stadium, Ulsan
4 June 2002
China	0–2	Costa Rica	Gwangju World Cup Stadium, Gwangju
8 June 2002
Brazil	4–0	China	Jeju World Cup Stadium, Seogwipo
9 June 2002
Costa Rica	1–1	Turkey	Incheon World Cup Stadium, Incheon
13 June 2002
Costa Rica	2–5	Brazil	Suwon World Cup Stadium, Suwon
Turkey	3–0	China	Seoul World Cup Stadium, Seoul

=== Group D ===
Pos	Team	Pld	W	D	L	GF	GA	GD	Pts	Qualification
1	South Korea (H)	3	2	1	0	4	1	+3	7	Advance to knockout stage
2	United States	3	1	1	1	5	6	−1	4	Advance to knockout stage
3	Portugal	3	1	0	2	6	4	+2	3	
4	Poland	3	1	0	2	3	7	−4	3	

Source: FIFA
(H) Hosts

4 June 2002
South Korea	2–0	Poland	Busan Asiad Main Stadium, Busan
5 June 2002
United States	3–2	Portugal	Suwon World Cup Stadium, Suwon
10 June 2002
South Korea	1–1	United States	Daegu World Cup Stadium, Daegu
Portugal	4–0	Poland	Jeonju World Cup Stadium, Jeonju
14 June 2002
Portugal	0–1	South Korea	Incheon World Cup Stadium, Incheon
Poland	3–1	United States	Daejeon World Cup Stadium, Daejeon

=== Group E ===
Pos	Team	Pld	W	D	L	GF	GA	GD	Pts	Qualification
1	Germany	3	2	1	0	11	1	+10	7	Advance to knockout stage
2	Republic of Ireland	3	1	2	0	5	2	+3	5	Advance to knockout stage
3	Cameroon	3	1	1	1	2	3	−1	4	
4	Saudi Arabia	3	0	0	3	0	12	−12	0	

Source: FIFA

1 June 2002
Republic of Ireland	1–1	Cameroon	Niigata Stadium, Niigata
Germany	8–0	Saudi Arabia	Sapporo Dome, Sapporo
5 June 2002
Germany	1–1	Republic of Ireland	Kashima Soccer Stadium, Ibaraki
6 June 2002
Cameroon	1–0	Saudi Arabia	Saitama Stadium, Saitama
11 June 2002
Cameroon	0–2	Germany	Ecopa Stadium, Shizuoka
Saudi Arabia	0–3	Republic of Ireland	International Stadium Yokohama, Yokohama

=== Group F ===
Pos	Team	Pld	W	D	L	GF	GA	GD	Pts	Qualification
1	Sweden	3	1	2	0	4	3	+1	5	Advance to knockout stage
2	England	3	1	2	0	2	1	+1	5	Advance to knockout stage
3	Argentina	3	1	1	1	2	2	0	4	
4	Nigeria	3	0	1	2	1	3	−2	1	

Source: FIFA

2 June 2002
Argentina	1–0	Nigeria	Kashima Soccer Stadium, Ibaraki
England	1–1	Sweden	Saitama Stadium, Saitama
7 June 2002
Sweden	2–1	Nigeria	Wing Stadium, Kobe
Argentina	0–1	England	Sapporo Dome, Sapporo
12 June 2002
Sweden	1–1	Argentina	Miyagi Stadium, Miyagi
Nigeria	0–0	England	Nagai Stadium, Osaka

=== Group G ===
Pos	Team	Pld	W	D	L	GF	GA	GD	Pts	Qualification
1	Mexico	3	2	1	0	4	2	+2	7	Advance to knockout stage
2	Italy	3	1	1	1	4	3	+1	4	Advance to knockout stage
3	Croatia	3	1	0	2	2	3	−1	3	
4	Ecuador	3	1	0	2	2	4	−2	3	

Source: FIFA

3 June 2002
Croatia	0–1	Mexico	Niigata Big Swan Stadium, Niigata
Italy	2–0	Ecuador	Sapporo Dome, Sapporo
8 June 2002
Italy	1–2	Croatia	Kashima Soccer Stadium, Ibaraki
9 June 2002
Mexico	2–1	Ecuador	Miyagi Stadium, Miyagi
13 June 2002
Mexico	1–1	Italy	Ōita Big Eye Stadium, Ōita
Ecuador	1–0	Croatia	International Stadium Yokohama, Yokohama

=== Group H ===
Pos	Team	Pld	W	D	L	GF	GA	GD	Pts	Qualification
1	Japan (H)	3	2	1	0	5	2	+3	7	Advance to knockout stage
2	Belgium	3	1	2	0	6	5	+1	5	Advance to knockout stage
3	Russia	3	1	0	2	4	4	0	3	
4	Tunisia	3	0	1	2	1	5	−4	1	

Source: FIFA
(H) Hosts

4 June 2002
Japan	2–2	Belgium	Saitama Stadium, Saitama
5 June 2002
Russia	2–0	Tunisia	Kobe Wing Stadium, Kobe
9 June 2002
Japan	1–0	Russia	International Stadium Yokohama, Yokohama
10 June 2002
Tunisia	1–1	Belgium	Ōita Big Eye Stadium, Ōita
14 June 2002
Tunisia	0–2	Japan	Nagai Stadium, Osaka
Belgium	3–2	Russia	Shizuoka Ecopa Stadium, Fukuroi, Shizuoka

== Knockout stage ==
For the second round, quarter-finals, and semi-finals, the qualifiers from Groups A, C, F, and H played their games in Japan while the qualifiers from Groups B, D, E, and G played their games in South Korea. Daegu, South Korea, hosted the match for third place while Yokohama, Japan, hosted the final.

=== Bracket ===
Round of 16
15 June – Seogwipo
Germany	1
Paraguay	0
17 June – Jeonju
Mexico	0
United States	2
16 June – Suwon
Spain (p)	1 (3)
Republic of Ireland	1 (2)
18 June – Daejeon
South Korea (g.g.)	2
Italy	1
15 June – Niigata
Denmark	0
England	3
17 June – Kobe
Brazil	2
Belgium	0
16 June – Ōita
Sweden	1
Senegal (g.g.)	2
18 June – Rifu
Japan	0
Turkey	1

Quarter-finals
21 June – Ulsan
Germany	1
United States	0
22 June – Gwangju
Spain	0 (3)
South Korea (p)	0 (5)
21 June – Fukuroi
England	1
Brazil	2
22 June – Osaka
Senegal	0
Turkey (g.g.)	1

Semi-finals
25 June – Seoul
Germany	1
South Korea	0
26 June – Saitama
Brazil	1
Turkey	0

Final
30 June – Yokohama
Germany	0
Brazil	2
Match for third place
29 June – Daegu
South Korea	2
Turkey	3

=== Round of 16 ===
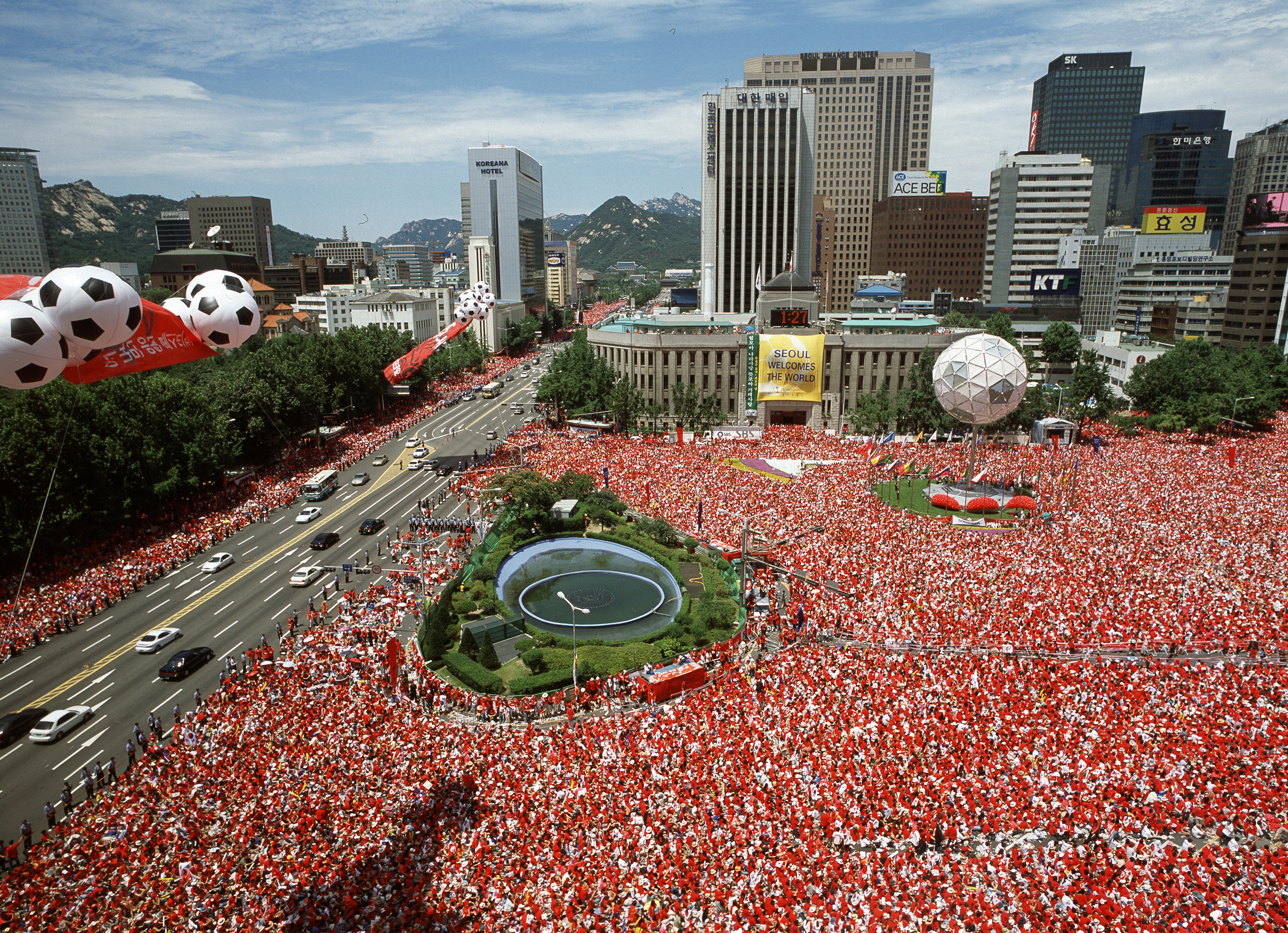
South Koreans watching their country's national team play Italy in the Round of 16 in Seoul Plaza

In the round of 16, Germany beat Paraguay 1–0 with a late goal by Oliver Neuville in Seogwipo. England defeated Denmark in Niigata 3–0, with all goals occurring in the first half of the game. Sweden and Senegal faced off in Ōita and finished 1–1 in regular time and it took a golden goal from Henri Camara in extra time to settle the game for Senegal 2–1, which led to Senegal becoming only the second African team to reach the last eight (after Cameroon in 1990). Spain and the Republic of Ireland played in Suwon, where Spain led most of the match 1–0 until a late penalty kick scored by Robbie Keane made the match go to extra time, where Spain emerged victorious in a penalty shoot-out. The United States beat CONCACAF rivals Mexico 2–0 in Jeonju with Brian McBride and Landon Donovan scoring the goals. Brazil defeated Belgium 2–0 in Kobe, with an amazing volley by Rivaldo and a splendid counter-attack goal by Ronaldo. Turkey ended co-hosts Japan's run with a 1–0 win in Miyagi, thanks to an Ümit Davala goal in the 12th minute. The other co-hosts, South Korea, defeated Italy 2–1 in extra time in Daejeon with a goal by Ahn Jung-hwan in the 117th minute. South Korea's win ensured that, for the very first time in the Cup's history, teams from five continents – Europe, North America, South America, Africa and Asia – reached the quarter-finals of the same tournament.

15 June 2002
15:30

Germany	1–0	Paraguay
Neuville 88'

Jeju World Cup Stadium, Seogwipo
Attendance: 25,176
Referee: Carlos Alberto Batres (Guatemala)

15 June 2002
20:30

Denmark	0–3	England
		Ferdinand 5'; Owen 22'; Heskey 44'

Big Swan Stadium, Niigata
Attendance: 40,582
Referee: Markus Merk (Germany)

16 June 2002
15:30

Sweden	1–2 (a.e.t./g.g.)	Senegal
Larsson 11'		Camara 37', 104'

Big Eye Stadium, Ōita
Attendance: 39,747
Referee: Ubaldo Aquino (Paraguay)

16 June 2002
20:30

Spain	1–1 (a.e.t.)	Republic of Ireland
Morientes 8'		Rob. Keane 90' (pen.)
Penalties
Hierro (penalty scored); Baraja (penalty scored); Juanfran (penalty missed); Valerón (penalty missed); Mendieta (penalty scored)	3–2	(penalty scored) Rob. Keane; (penalty missed) Holland; (penalty missed) Connolly; (penalty missed) Kilbane; (penalty scored) Finnan

Suwon World Cup Stadium, Suwon
Attendance: 38,926
Referee: Anders Frisk (Sweden)

17 June 2002
15:30

Mexico	0–2	United States
		McBride 8'; Donovan 65'

Jeonju World Cup Stadium, Jeonju
Attendance: 36,380
Referee: Vítor Melo Pereira (Portugal)

17 June 2002
20:30

Brazil	2–0	Belgium
Rivaldo 67'; Ronaldo 87'

Kobe Wing Stadium, Kobe
Attendance: 40,440
Referee: Peter Prendergast (Jamaica)

18 June 2002
15:30

Japan	0–1	Turkey
		Davala 12'

Miyagi Stadium, Rifu
Attendance: 45,666
Referee: Pierluigi Collina (Italy)

18 June 2002
20:30

South Korea	2–1 (a.e.t./g.g.)	Italy
Seol Ki-hyeon 88'; Ahn Jung-hwan 117'		Vieri 18'

Daejeon World Cup Stadium, Daejeon
Attendance: 38,588
Referee: Byron Moreno (Ecuador)

=== Quarter-finals ===
In the quarter-finals, England and Brazil squared off in Shizuoka, where Ronaldinho scored a free-kick goal over England's David Seaman early in the second half as Brazil won 2–1. The United States lost to Germany 1–0 in Ulsan by a Michael Ballack goal in the 39th minute, but controversy surrounded the game when United States demanded the referee give a penalty for a goal-line handball by Torsten Frings in the 49th minute, but the referee did not award the penalty. South Korea got another success in Gwangju in a controversial manner, overcoming Spain 5–3 on penalties after a 0–0 draw in which the Spaniards twice thought they had scored while onside; however, the efforts were disallowed by the referee with controversial decisions. The hosts became the first team in the Asian Football Confederation to reach the semi-finals of the World Cup, eclipsing the record of their North Korean counterparts who reached the quarter-finals in 1966. They also became the first World Cup semi-final team not from UEFA or CONMEBOL since the United States did it in the first World Cup in 1930. Turkey defeated Senegal 1–0 in Osaka, with a golden goal scored by İlhan Mansız in the 94th minute.

21 June 2002
15:30

England	1–2	Brazil
Owen 23'		Rivaldo 45+2'; Ronaldinho 50'

Stadium Ecopa, Fukuroi
Attendance: 47,436
Referee: Felipe Ramos (Mexico)

21 June 2002
20:30

Germany	1–0	United States
Ballack 39'

Munsu Cup Stadium, Ulsan
Attendance: 37,337
Referee: Hugh Dallas (Scotland)

22 June 2002
15:30

Spain	0–0 (a.e.t.)	South Korea
Penalties
Hierro (penalty scored); Baraja (penalty scored); Xavi (penalty scored); Joaquín (penalty missed)	3–5	(penalty scored) Hwang Sun-hong; (penalty scored) Park Ji-sung; (penalty scored) Seol Ki-hyeon; (penalty scored) Ahn Jung-hwan; (penalty scored) Hong Myung-bo

Gwangju World Cup Stadium, Gwangju
Attendance: 42,114
Referee: Gamal Al-Ghandour (Egypt)

22 June 2002
20:30

Senegal	0–1 (a.e.t./g.g.)	Turkey
		Mansız 94'

Nagai Stadium, Osaka
Attendance: 44,233
Referee: Óscar Ruiz (Colombia)

=== Semi-finals ===
The semi-finals saw two 1–0 games; the first, played in Seoul, saw Michael Ballack's goal suffice for Germany to eliminate South Korea. However, Ballack had already received a yellow card during the match before, which forced him to miss the final based on accumulated yellow cards. The next day in Saitama, Brazil's Ronaldo scored his sixth goal of the tournament to defeat Turkey.

25 June 2002
20:30

Germany	1–0	South Korea
Ballack 75'

Seoul World Cup Stadium, Seoul
Attendance: 65,256
Referee: Urs Meier (Switzerland)

26 June 2002
20:30

Brazil	1–0	Turkey
Ronaldo 49'

Saitama Stadium, Saitama
Attendance: 61,058
Referee: Kim Milton Nielsen (Denmark)

=== Match for third place ===
In the match for third place in Daegu, Turkey beat the South Koreans 3–2, their first goal coming from Hakan Şükür straight from the opening kick-off (even though South Korea kicked off) in 10.8 seconds, the fastest ever goal in World Cup history.

29 June 2002
20:00

South Korea	2–3	Turkey
Lee Eul-yong 9'; Song Chong-gug 90+3'		Şükür 1'; Mansız 13', 32'

Daegu World Cup Stadium, Daegu
Attendance: 63,483
Referee: Saad Mane (Kuwait)

=== Final ===
In the final match held in Yokohama, Japan, two goals from Ronaldo secured the World Cup for Brazil as they claimed victory over Germany. Ronaldo scored twice in the second half and, after the game, won the Golden Shoe award for the tournament's leading scorer with eight goals. This was the fifth time Brazil had won the World Cup, cementing their status as the most successful national team in the history of the competition. Brazil became the only team since Argentina in 1986 to win the trophy without needing to win a penalty shoot-out at some stage during the knockout phase and the total number of penalty shoot-outs (2) was the lowest since the four-round knockout format was introduced in 1986. Brazil also became the first team to win every match at a World Cup since 1970 and set a new record for highest aggregate goal difference (+14) for a World Cup winner. Brazil's captain Cafu became the first player to appear in three successive World Cup finals, accepted the trophy on behalf of the team.

30 June 2002
20:00

Germany	0–2	Brazil
		Ronaldo 67', 79'

International Stadium, Yokohama
Attendance: 69,029
Referee: Pierluigi Collina (Italy)

== Statistics ==
=== Goalscorers ===
Ronaldo won the Golden Shoe after scoring eight goals. In total, 161 goals were scored by 109 players, with three of them credited as own goals. Two of those own goals were in the same match, marking the first time in FIFA World Cup history that own goals had been scored by both teams in the same match.

There were 161 goals scored in 64 matches, for an average of 2.52 goals per match.

8 goals

- (Brazil) Ronaldo

5 goals

- (Brazil) Rivaldo
- (Germany) Miroslav Klose

4 goals

- (Denmark) Jon Dahl Tomasson
- (Italy) Christian Vieri

3 goals

- (Belgium) Marc Wilmots
- (Germany) Michael Ballack
- (Republic of Ireland) Robbie Keane
- (Portugal) Pauleta
- (Spain) Fernando Morientes
- (Spain) Raúl
- (Senegal) Papa Bouba Diop
- (Sweden) Henrik Larsson
- (Turkey) İlhan Mansız

2 goals

- (Brazil) Ronaldinho
- (Costa Rica) Rónald Gómez
- (England) Michael Owen
- (Japan) Junichi Inamoto
- (Mexico) Jared Borgetti
- (Paraguay) Nelson Cuevas
- (Senegal) Henri Camara
- (South Korea) Ahn Jung-hwan
- (Spain) Fernando Hierro
- (Turkey) Ümit Davala
- (Turkey) Hasan Şaş
- (United States) Landon Donovan
- (United States) Brian McBride

1 goal

- (Argentina) Gabriel Batistuta
- (Argentina) Hernán Crespo
- (Belgium) Wesley Sonck
- (Belgium) Peter Van Der Heyden
- (Belgium) Johan Walem
- (Brazil) Edmílson
- (Brazil) Júnior
- (Brazil) Roberto Carlos
- (Cameroon) Samuel Eto'o
- (Cameroon) Patrick M'Boma
- (Costa Rica) Winston Parks
- (Costa Rica) Paulo Wanchope
- (Costa Rica) Mauricio Wright
- (Croatia) Ivica Olić
- (Croatia) Milan Rapaić
- (Denmark) Dennis Rommedahl
- (Ecuador) Agustín Delgado
- (Ecuador) Édison Méndez
- (England) David Beckham
- (England) Sol Campbell
- (England) Rio Ferdinand
- (England) Emile Heskey
- (Germany) Oliver Bierhoff
- (Germany) Marco Bode
- (Germany) Carsten Jancker
- (Germany) Thomas Linke
- (Germany) Oliver Neuville
- (Germany) Bernd Schneider
- (Italy) Alessandro Del Piero
- (Japan) Hiroaki Morishima
- (Japan) Hidetoshi Nakata
- (Japan) Takayuki Suzuki
- (Mexico) Cuauhtémoc Blanco
- (Mexico) Gerardo Torrado
- (Nigeria) Julius Aghahowa
- (Paraguay) Francisco Arce
- (Paraguay) Jorge Campos
- (Paraguay) Roque Santa Cruz
- (Poland) Paweł Kryszałowicz
- (Poland) Emmanuel Olisadebe
- (Poland) Marcin Żewłakow
- (Portugal) Beto
- (Portugal) Rui Costa
- (Republic of Ireland) Gary Breen
- (Republic of Ireland) Damien Duff
- (Republic of Ireland) Matt Holland
- (Russia) Vladimir Beschastnykh
- (Russia) Valeri Karpin
- (Russia) Dmitri Sychev
- (Russia) Yegor Titov
- (Senegal) Salif Diao
- (Senegal) Khalilou Fadiga
- (Slovenia) Milenko Ačimovič
- (Slovenia) Sebastjan Cimirotič
- (South Africa) Quinton Fortune
- (South Africa) Benni McCarthy
- (South Africa) Teboho Mokoena
- (South Africa) Siyabonga Nomvethe
- (South Africa) Lucas Radebe
- (South Korea) Hwang Sun-hong
- (South Korea) Lee Eul-yong
- (South Korea) Park Ji-sung
- (South Korea) Seol Ki-hyeon
- (South Korea) Song Chong-gug
- (South Korea) Yoo Sang-chul
- (Spain) Gaizka Mendieta
- (Spain) Juan Carlos Valerón
- (Sweden) Niclas Alexandersson
- (Sweden) Anders Svensson
- (Tunisia) Raouf Bouzaiene
- (Turkey) Emre Belözoğlu
- (Turkey) Bülent Korkmaz
- (Turkey) Hakan Şükür
- (United States) Clint Mathis
- (United States) John O'Brien
- (Uruguay) Diego Forlán
- (Uruguay) Richard Morales
- (Uruguay) Álvaro Recoba
- (Uruguay) Darío Rodríguez

1 own goal

- (Portugal) Jorge Costa (against the United States)
- (Spain) Carles Puyol (against Paraguay)
- (United States) Jeff Agoos (against Portugal)

Source: FIFA

=== Disciplinary statistics ===
Player	Offence(s)	Suspension(s)
(Croatia) Boris Živković	(red card) in Group G vs Mexico (matchday 1; 3 June)	Group G vs Italy (matchday 2; 8 June)
(Turkey) Alpay Özalan	(red card) in Group C vs Brazil (matchday 1; 3 June)	Group C vs Costa Rica (matchday 2; 9 June)
(Turkey) Hakan Ünsal	(yellow card) (yellow-red card) in Group C vs Brazil (matchday 1; 3 June)	Group C vs Costa Rica (matchday 2; 9 June)
(Senegal) Salif Diao	(red card) in Group A vs Denmark (matchday 2; 6 June)	Group A vs Uruguay (matchday 3; 11 June)
(France) Thierry Henry	(red card) in Group A vs Uruguay (matchday 2; 6 June)	Group A vs Denmark (matchday 3; 11 June)
(France) Emmanuel Petit	(yellow card) in Group A vs Senegal (matchday 1; 31 May); (yellow card) in Group A vs Uruguay (matchday 2; 6 June)	Group A vs Denmark (matchday 3; 11 June)
(Tunisia) Hassen Gabsi	(yellow card) in Group H vs Russia (matchday 1; 5 June); (yellow card) in Group H vs Belgium (matchday 2; 10 June)	Group H vs Japan (matchday 3; 14 June)
(Poland) Piotr Świerczewski	(yellow card) in Group D vs South Korea (matchday 1; 4 June); (yellow card) in Group D vs Portugal (matchday 2; 10 June)	Group D vs United States (matchday 3; 14 June)
(Denmark) Christian Poulsen	(yellow card) in Group A vs Senegal (matchday 2; 6 June); (yellow card) in Group A vs France (matchday 3; 11 June)	Round of 16 vs England (15 June)
(Senegal) Khalilou Fadiga	(yellow card) in Group A vs Denmark (matchday 2; 6 June); (yellow card) in Group A vs Uruguay (matchday 3; 11 June)	Round of 16 vs Sweden (16 June)
(Germany) Dietmar Hamann	(yellow card) in Group E vs Saudi Arabia (matchday 1; 1 June); (yellow card) in Group E vs Cameroon (matchday 3; 11 June)	Round of 16 vs Paraguay (15 June)
(Germany) Christian Ziege	(yellow card) in Group E vs Saudi Arabia (matchday 1; 1 June); (yellow card) in Group E vs Cameroon (matchday 3; 11 June)	Round of 16 vs Paraguay (15 June)
(Germany) Carsten Ramelow	(yellow card) (yellow-red card) in Group E vs Cameroon (matchday 3; 11 June)	Round of 16 vs Paraguay (15 June)
(Cameroon) Patrick Suffo	(yellow card) (yellow-red card) in Group E vs Germany (matchday 3; 11 June)	Suspension served outside tournament
(Argentina) Claudio Caniggia	(red card) in Group F vs Sweden (matchday 3; 12 June)	Suspension served outside tournament
(Paraguay) Carlos Paredes	(yellow card) (yellow-red card) in Group B vs Slovenia (matchday 3; 12 June)	Round of 16 vs Germany (15 June)
(Slovenia) Nastja Čeh	(red card) in Group B vs Paraguay (matchday 3; 12 June)	Suspension served outside tournament
(Turkey) Emre Aşık	(yellow card) in Group C vs Costa Rica (matchday 2; 9 June); (yellow card) in Group C vs China (matchday 3; 13 June)	Round of 16 vs Japan (18 June)
(Turkey) Emre Belözoğlu	(yellow card) in Group C vs Costa Rica (matchday 2; 9 June); (yellow card) in Group C vs China (matchday 3; 13 June)	Round of 16 vs Japan (18 June)
(China) Shao Jiayi	(red card) in Group C vs Turkey (matchday 3; 13 June)	Suspension served outside tournament
(Italy) Fabio Cannavaro	(yellow card) in Group G vs Ecuador (matchday 1; 3 June); (yellow card) in Group G vs Mexico (matchday 3; 13 June)	Round of 16 vs South Korea (18 June)
(Portugal) João Pinto	(red card) in Group D vs South Korea (matchday 3; 14 June)	Suspension served outside tournament
(Portugal) Beto	(yellow card) (yellow-red card) in Group D vs South Korea (matchday 3; 14 June)	Suspension served outside tournament
(United States) Frankie Hejduk	(yellow card) in Group D vs South Korea (matchday 2; 10 June); (yellow card) in Group D vs Poland (matchday 3; 14 June)	Round of 16 vs Mexico (17 June)
(Paraguay) Roberto Acuña	(red card) in Round of 16 vs Germany (15 June)	Suspension served outside tournament
(Mexico) Rafael Márquez	(red card) in Round of 16 vs United States (17 June)	Suspension served outside tournament
(Italy) Francesco Totti	(yellow card) (yellow-red card) in Round of 16 vs South Korea (18 June)	Suspension served outside tournament
(Brazil) Ronaldinho	(red card) in Quarter-finals vs England (21 June)	Semi-finals vs Turkey (26 June)
(Germany) Michael Ballack	(yellow card) in Round of 16 vs Paraguay (15 June); (yellow card) in Semi-finals vs South Korea (25 June)	Final vs Brazil (30 June)

- Total number of yellow cards: 272
- Average yellow cards per match: 4.25
- Total number of red cards: 17
- Average red cards per match: 0.27
- First yellow card of the tournament:
  Emmanuel Petit for France against Senegal
- First red card of the tournament:
  Boris Živković for Croatia against Mexico
- Fastest yellow card from kick off: 2 minutes
  Henri Camara for Senegal against Uruguay, Jesús Arellano for Mexico against Italy
- Fastest yellow card after coming on as a substitute: 3 minutes
  Alberto García Aspe for Mexico against United States (introduced in the 78th minute)
- Latest yellow card in a match without extra time: 90+4 minutes
  Pape Thiaw for Senegal against Sweden
- Latest yellow card in a match with extra time: 115 minutes
  Choi Jin-cheul for South Korea against Italy
- Fastest dismissal from kick off: 22nd minute
  Carlos Paredes for Paraguay against Slovenia
- Fastest dismissal of a substitute: 12 minutes
  Shao Jiayi for China against Turkey (introduced in the 46th minute)
- Latest dismissal in a match without extra time: 90+4 minutes
  Hakan Ünsal for Turkey against Brazil
- Latest dismissal in a match with extra time: 103 minutes
  Francesco Totti for Italy against South Korea
- Shortest time difference between two yellow cards given to the same player: 3 minutes
  Carsten Ramelow for Germany against Cameroon (booked in the 37th minute and again in the 40th minute)
- Most yellow cards (team): 19
  Turkey
- Most red cards (team): 2
  Paraguay, Portugal, Turkey
- Fewest yellow cards (team): 2
  Nigeria
- Most yellow cards (player): 3
  Michael Ballack, Emre Belözoğlu, Beto, Tugay Kerimoğlu, Francesco Totti
- Most red cards (player): 1
  Roberto Acuña, Beto, Claudio Caniggia, Nastja Čeh, Salif Diao, Thierry Henry, Rafael Márquez, Alpay Özalan, Carlos Paredes, João Pinto, Carsten Ramelow, Ronaldinho, Shao Jiayi, Patrick Suffo, Francesco Totti, Hakan Ünsal, Boris Živković
- Most yellow cards (match): 16
  Cameroon vs Germany
- Most red cards (match): 2
  Brazil vs Turkey, Cameroon vs Germany, Slovenia vs Paraguay, Portugal vs South Korea
- Fewest yellow cards (match): 0
  Croatia vs Mexico, Germany vs Republic of Ireland, Nigeria vs England
- Most cards in one match: 16 yellow cards and 2 red cards
  Cameroon vs Germany

=== Awards ===
Golden Boot	Golden Ball	Yashin Award	Best Young Player	FIFA Fair Play Trophy	Most Entertaining Team
(Brazil) Ronaldo	(Germany) Oliver Kahn^{1}	(Germany) Oliver Kahn	(United States) Landon Donovan	Belgium	South Korea

^{1}Oliver Kahn is the only goalkeeper to have won the Golden Ball in FIFA World Cup history.

=== All-star team ===
Goalkeepers	Defenders	Midfielders	Forwards
(Germany) Oliver Kahn (Turkey) Rüştü Reçber	(England) Sol Campbell (Spain) Fernando Hierro (South Korea) Hong Myung-bo (Turkey) Alpay Özalan (Brazil) Roberto Carlos	(Germany) Michael Ballack (United States) Claudio Reyna (Brazil) Rivaldo (Brazil) Ronaldinho (South Korea) Yoo Sang-chul	(Senegal) El Hadji Diouf (Germany) Miroslav Klose (Brazil) Ronaldo (Turkey) Hasan Şaş
Source: USA Today, 29 June 2002

=== Tournament ranking ===
Per statistical convention in football, matches decided in extra time are counted as wins and losses, while matches decided by penalty shoot-outs are counted as draws.

Pos	Grp	Team	Pld	W	D	L	GF	GA	GD	Pts	Final result
1	C	Brazil	7	7	0	0	18	4	+14	21	Champions
2	E	Germany	7	5	1	1	14	3	+11	16	Runners-up
3	C	Turkey	7	4	1	2	10	6	+4	13	Third place
4	D	South Korea (H)	7	3	2	2	8	6	+2	11	Fourth place
5	B	Spain	5	3	2	0	10	5	+5	11	Eliminated in quarter-finals
6	F	England	5	2	2	1	6	3	+3	8	Eliminated in quarter-finals
7	A	Senegal	5	2	2	1	7	6	+1	8	Eliminated in quarter-finals
8	D	United States	5	2	1	2	7	7	0	7	Eliminated in quarter-finals
9	H	Japan (H)	4	2	1	1	5	3	+2	7	Eliminated in round of 16
10	A	Denmark	4	2	1	1	5	5	0	7	Eliminated in round of 16
11	G	Mexico	4	2	1	1	4	4	0	7	Eliminated in round of 16
12	E	Republic of Ireland	4	1	3	0	6	3	+3	6	Eliminated in round of 16
13	F	Sweden	4	1	2	1	5	5	0	5	Eliminated in round of 16
14	H	Belgium	4	1	2	1	6	7	−1	5	Eliminated in round of 16
15	G	Italy	4	1	1	2	5	5	0	4	Eliminated in round of 16
16	B	Paraguay	4	1	1	2	6	7	−1	4	Eliminated in round of 16
17	B	South Africa	3	1	1	1	5	5	0	4	Eliminated in group stage
18	F	Argentina	3	1	1	1	2	2	0	4	Eliminated in group stage
19	C	Costa Rica	3	1	1	1	5	6	−1	4	Eliminated in group stage
20	E	Cameroon	3	1	1	1	2	3	−1	4	Eliminated in group stage
21	D	Portugal	3	1	0	2	6	4	+2	3	Eliminated in group stage
22	H	Russia	3	1	0	2	4	4	0	3	Eliminated in group stage
23	G	Croatia	3	1	0	2	2	3	−1	3	Eliminated in group stage
24	G	Ecuador	3	1	0	2	2	4	−2	3	Eliminated in group stage
25	D	Poland	3	1	0	2	3	7	−4	3	Eliminated in group stage
26	A	Uruguay	3	0	2	1	4	5	−1	2	Eliminated in group stage
27	F	Nigeria	3	0	1	2	1	3	−2	1	Eliminated in group stage
28	A	France	3	0	1	2	0	3	−3	1	Eliminated in group stage
29	H	Tunisia	3	0	1	2	1	5	−4	1	Eliminated in group stage
30	B	Slovenia	3	0	0	3	2	7	−5	0	Eliminated in group stage
31	C	China	3	0	0	3	0	9	−9	0	Eliminated in group stage
32	E	Saudi Arabia	3	0	0	3	0	12	−12	0	Eliminated in group stage

Source: FIFA
(H) Hosts

== Marketing ==
=== Sponsorship ===
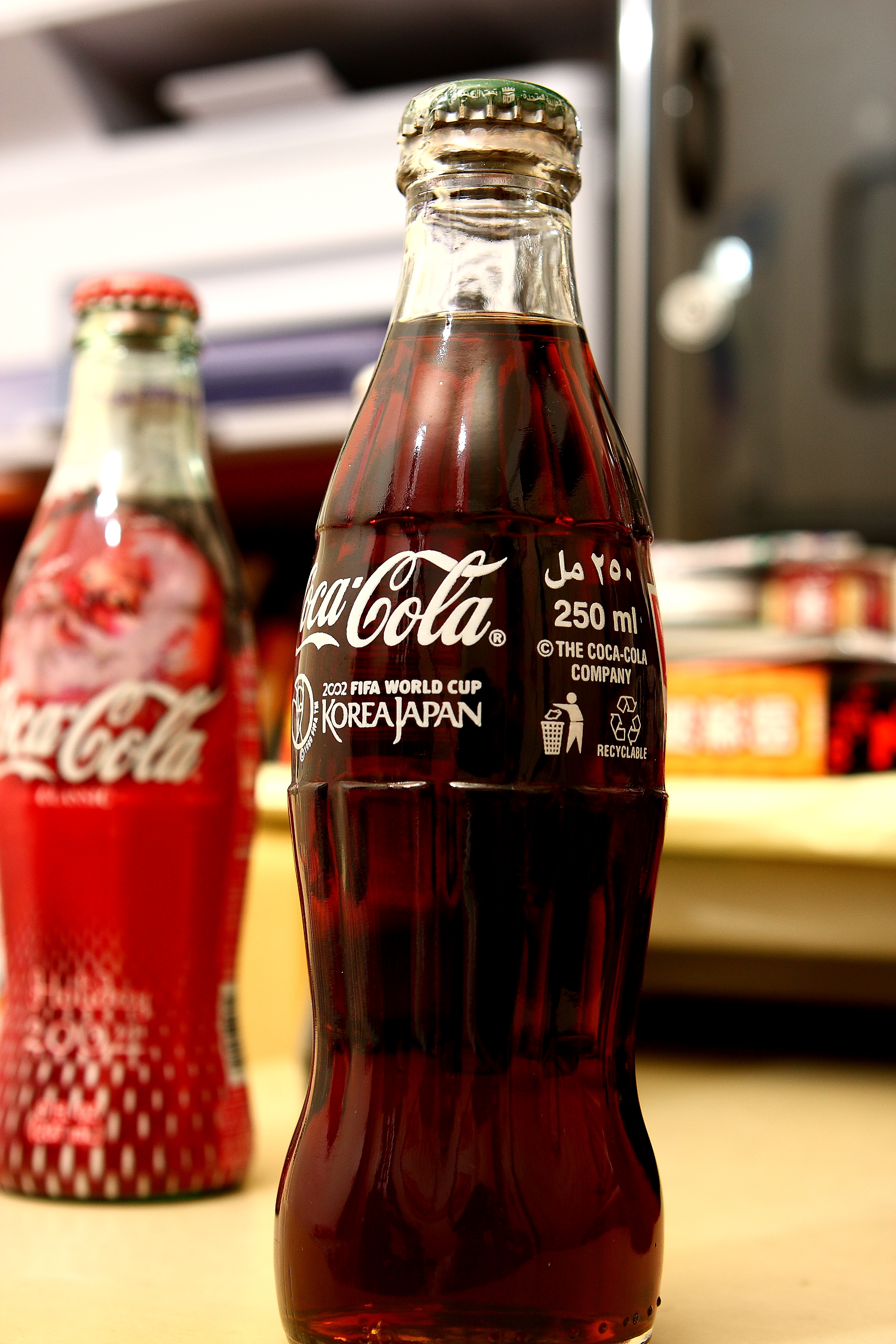
Coca-Cola was one of the sponsors of FIFA World Cup 2002.

The sponsors of the 2002 FIFA World Cup are divided into three categories: FIFA World Cup Sponsors and South Korea and Japan Suppliers.

List of sponsors for the tournament
FIFA World Cup sponsors	South Korea sponsors	Japan sponsors
Adidas; Avaya; Budweiser; Coca-Cola; Fuji Xerox; Fujifilm; Gillette; Duracell; Hyundai; JVC; MasterCard; McDonald's; Philips; Toshiba; Yahoo!	Hyundai Marine and Fire Insurance; KCC Corporation; Kookmin Bank; Korea Telecom; Korean Air; KTF; Lotte Hotel; Posco	Asahi Shimbun; Nippon Life Insurance; Nippon Telegraph and Telephone; Nissin Foods; Nomura Securities; NTT DoCoMo; Tokyo Electric Power Company; Tokio Marine and Fire Insurance

=== Ticket sales problem ===
The original domestic ticket allocation had fully sold out and the organising committee completed sales of tickets returned from the international allocation by the end of April. However, there were a significant number of empty seats at the opening matches. It was gradually revealed that the World Cup Ticketing Bureau (WCTB) still had unsold tickets in its possession. After FIFA agreed to sell this inventory, JAWOC undertook sales over telephone and WCTB handled the internet sales. For the second round Japan vs. Turkey match in Miyagi in particular, although it was reported by both parties that all tickets had been sold, some 700 seats remained empty.

== Symbols ==
Ato, Kaz and Nik were the 2002 World Cup mascots.

=== Mascot ===
The official mascots of the 2002 World Cup were Ato, Kaz and Nik (the Spheriks), orange, purple and blue (respectively) futuristic CGI creatures. Playing their own version of soccer called Atmoball, Ato is the coach while Kaz and Nik are players. The three individual names were selected from shortlists by users on the Internet and at McDonald's outlets in the host countries.

=== Match ball ===
The official match ball was the Fevernova, manufactured by Adidas.

=== Music ===
The official song was "Boom". The official local song of this World Cup was "Let's Get Together Now". The official anthem was "Anthem".

== Cultural event ==
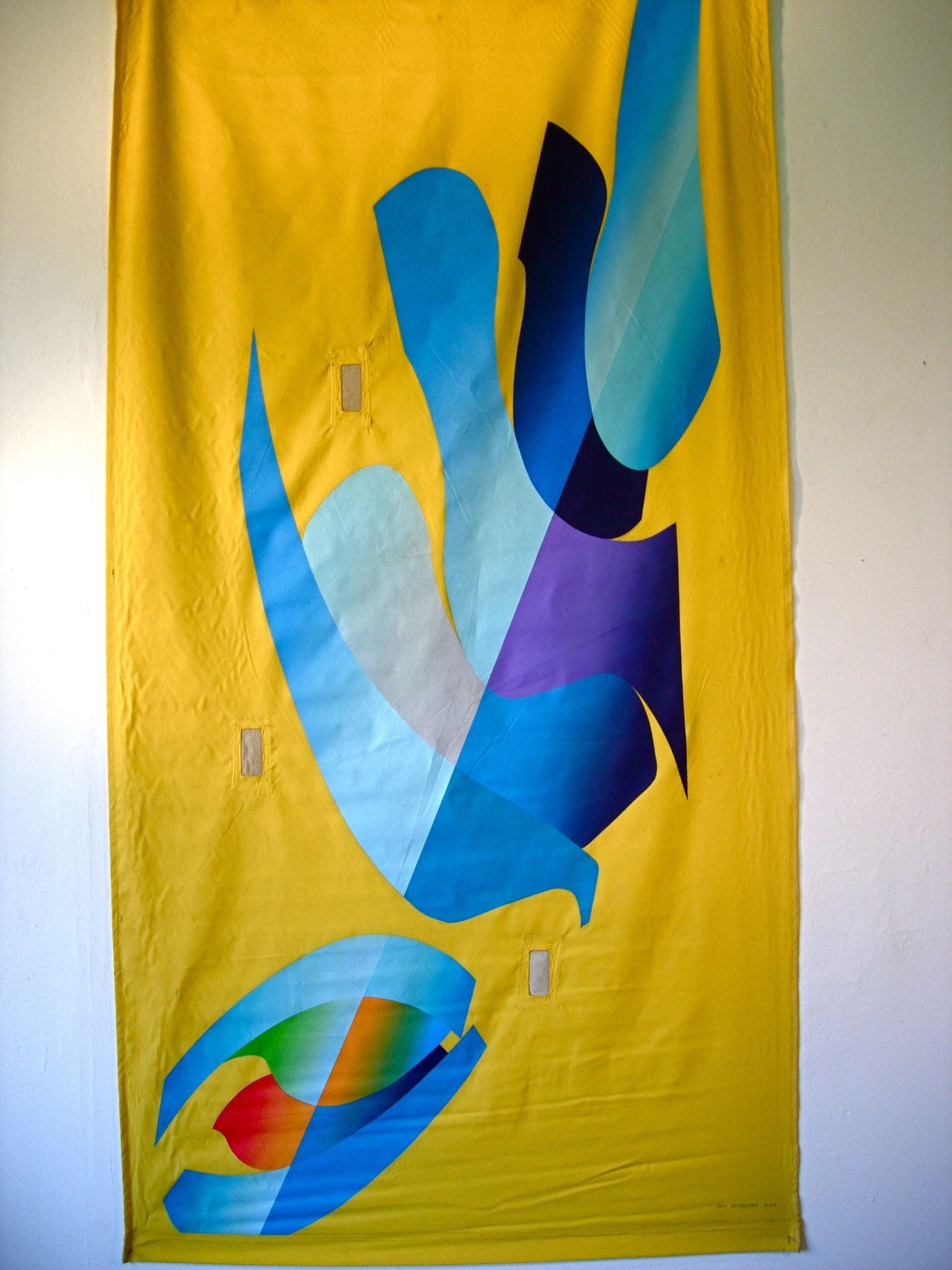
In Search of Fresh Air, banner by Ray L. Burggraf

The official FIFA cultural event of the 2002 World Cup was a flag festival called Poetry of the Winds. Held in Nanjicheon Park, an area of the World Cup Park close to Seoul World Cup Stadium, Poetry of the Winds was exhibited from 29 May to 25 June in order to wish success upon the World Cup and promote a festive atmosphere. During the flag art festival, hand-painted flags from global artists were displayed as a greeting to international guests in a manner that was designed to promote harmony.

== Concerns ==
The World Cup was originally going to be hosted either in Japan or in South Korea, but in the end both rivals had decided to share the hosting duties thus making this World Cup the first to have multiple host nations. However, there were concerns regarding the selection of hosts due to logistical issues caused by fans traveling across two separate sovereign nations as well as whether some of the 20 stadiums to be constructed for the World Cup would be ready in time for it or not. While political and infrastructural problems were eventually overcome, there still remained the issue of East Asia's wet season which could disrupt the play. The timing of the tournament thus had been altered to mitigate as much as possible against such issues, with the tournament kicking off on May 31 and due to run until June 30, the earliest date for a World Cup final since 1986.

For European viewers, the time difference meant that matches were taking place in the local time morning, something viewers in Europe were not used to. Some schools and businesses chose to open late on match days or set up communal watching events before the start of work.

== Economic impact ==
The tournament had a major economic impact on both South Korea and Japan, generating an estimated US$1.3 billion in revenue. Spending from World Cup tourists in South Korea created US$307 million in direct income and US$713 million in valued added. Japan spent an estimated US$5.6 billion on preparations for the event, which had a US$24.8 billion impact on the Japanese economy and accounted for 0.6% of their GDP in 2002.

== See also ==
- 2002 FIFA World Cup broadcasting rights
- Adidas Fevernova – match ball
- The Official Album of the 2002 FIFA World Cup
