= United States men's national soccer team results (2000–2009) =

This is a compilation of every international soccer game played by the United States men's national soccer team from 2000 through 2009. It includes the team's record for that year, each game and the date played. It also lists the U.S. goal scorers.

The format is: home team listed first, U.S. listed first at home or neutral site.

Records are in win–loss–tie format. Games decided in penalty kicks are counted as ties, as per the FIFA standard.

== 2000 ==
Wins	Losses	Draws
9	2	6

Win Draw Loss

January 16 Friendly	United States	1–1	Iran	Pasadena, California
14:00 UTC−08	Armas 48'		Mahdavikia 7'	Stadium: Rose Bowl; Attendance: 50,181; Referee: Benito Archundia (Mexico)

January 29 Friendly	Chile	1–2	United States	Coquimbo, Chile
22:00 UTC−03	Riveros 57'		Lewis 55'; Jones 88'	Stadium: Estadio Municipal Francisco Sánchez Rumoroso; Attendance: 11,000; Referee: Pedro Saucedo (Bolivia)

February 12 Gold Cup GS	United States	3–0	Haiti	Miami, Florida
19:00 UTC−05	Kirovski 18'; Wynalda 55' (pen.); Jones 89'			Stadium: Orange Bowl; Attendance: 49,591; Referee: Olger Mejías (Costa Rica)

February 16 Gold Cup GS	United States	1–0	Peru	Miami, Florida
21:00 UTC−05	Jones 59'		Zúñiga (yellow card) 70' (yellow-red card) 77'	Stadium: Orange Bowl; Attendance: 36,004; Referee: Felipe Ramos (Mexico)

February 19 Gold Cup QF	United States	2–2 (a.e.t.) (1–2 p)	Colombia	Miami, Florida
15:00 UTC−05	McBride 20'; Armas 51'		Asprilla 24'; Bedoya 81' (yellow card) 53' (yellow-red card) 120'	Stadium: Orange Bowl; Attendance: 32,972; Referee: Carlos Batres (Guatemala)
	Penalties
	Wynalda (penalty missed); Reyna (penalty missed); Lewis (penalty scored); Armas (penalty missed); Olsen (penalty missed)		Pérez (penalty missed); Martínez (penalty scored); Candelo (penalty missed); Mosquera (penalty scored)

March 12 Friendly	United States	1–1	Tunisia	Birmingham, Alabama
13:30 UTC−06	Olsen 90+2'		Kanzari 78'	Stadium: Legion Field; Attendance: 21,637; Referee: Peter Prendergast (Jamaica)

April 26 Friendly	Russia	2–0	United States	Moscow, Russia
19:00 UTC+04	Titov 63'; Karpin 90+2'			Stadium: Central Dynamo Stadium; Attendance: 15,000; Referee: Darius Mieželis (Lithuania)

June 3 U.S. Cup	United States	4–0	South Africa	Washington, D.C.
16:00 UTC−04	Jones 36', 43'; Reyna 65'; Stewart 68'			Stadium: RFK Stadium; Attendance: 16,570; Referee: Antonio Marrufo (Mexico)

June 6 U.S. Cup	United States	1–1	Republic of Ireland	Foxborough, Massachusetts
20:00 UTC−04	Razov 68'		Foley 31'	Stadium: Foxboro Stadium; Attendance: 16,319; Referee: Benito Archundia (Mexico)

June 11 U.S. Cup	United States	3–0	Mexico	East Rutherford, New Jersey
13:00 UTC−04	McBride 33'; Hejduk 79'; Razov 85'		Ramírez (yellow card) 41' (yellow-red card) 70'	Stadium: Giants Stadium; Attendance: 45,008; Referee: Peter Prendergast (Jamaica)

July 16 WCQ SF	Guatemala	1–1	United States	Mazatenango, Guatemala
11:00 UTC−06	Ruiz 88'		Razov 45+1'	Stadium: Estadio Carlos Salazar Hijo; Attendance: 10,000; Referee: Benito Archundia (Mexico)

July 23 WCQ SF	Costa Rica	2–1	United States	San José, Costa Rica
11:00 UTC−06	Fonseca 10'; Medford 90+3' (pen.)		Stewart 65'	Stadium: Estadio Ricardo Saprissa; Attendance: 20,000; Referee: Peter Prendergast (Jamaica)

August 16 WCQ SF	United States	7–0	Barbados	Foxborough, Massachusetts
20:30 UTC−04	Pope 14'; McBride 28'; Moore 45', 82'; O'Brien 46'; Ramos 72'; Stewart 74'		Lavine (yellow card) 36' (yellow-red card) 41'	Stadium: Foxboro Stadium; Attendance: 18,334; Referee: Jose Pineda (Honduras)

September 3 WCQ SF	United States	1–0	Guatemala	Washington, D.C.
14:00 UTC−04	Lewis (red card) 69'; McBride 72'			Stadium: RFK Stadium; Attendance: 51,996; Referee: Edgar Rangel (Mexico)

October 11 WCQ SF	United States	0–0	Costa Rica	Columbus, Ohio
20:00 UTC−04				Stadium: Columbus Crew Stadium; Attendance: 24,430; Referee: Ramesh Ramdhan (Trinidad and Tobago)

October 25 Friendly	United States	2–0	Mexico	Los Angeles, California
20:00 UTC−07	Donovan 50'; Wolff 79'			Stadium: Los Angeles Memorial Coliseum; Attendance: 61,072; Referee: Carlos Batres (Guatemala)

November 15 WCQ SF	Barbados	0–4	United States	Bridgetown, Barbados
15:00 UTC−04			Mathis 63'; Stewart 73'; Jones 77'; Razov 90+2'	Stadium: Barbados National Stadium; Attendance: 4,000; Referee: Ramesh Ramdhan (Trinidad and Tobago)

== 2001 ==
Wins	Losses	Draws
6	6	3

Win Draw Loss

January 27 Friendly	United States	2–1	China	Oakland, California
14:30 UTC−08	McBride 27'; Wang 46' (o.g.)		Qu 74'	Stadium: Network Associates Coliseum; Attendance: 8,903; Referee: Mike Seifert (Canada)

February 3 Friendly	United States	0–1	Colombia	Miami, Florida
16:00 UTC−05			Grisales 53'	Stadium: Orange Bowl; Attendance: 14,169; Referee: Rodolfo Sibrían (El Salvador)

February 28 WCQ F	United States	2–0	Mexico	Columbus, Ohio
19:30 UTC−05	Wolff 47'; Stewart 87'			Stadium: Columbus Crew Stadium; Attendance: 24,329; Referee: Rodolfo Sibrian (El Salvador)

March 3 Friendly	United States	1–2	Brazil	Pasadena, California
13:00 UTC−08	Mathis 40'		Ronaldinho 25'; Euller 56'	Stadium: Rose Bowl; Attendance: 45,387; Referee: Felipe Ramos Rizo (Mexico)

March 28 WCQ F	Honduras	1–2	United States	San Pedro Sula, Honduras
19:30 UTC−06	de León 59'		Stewart 33'; Mathis 87'; Jones (red card) 88'	Stadium: Estadio Olímpico Metropolitano; Attendance: 46,000; Referee: Freddy Burgos (Guatemala)

April 25 WCQ F	United States	1–0	Costa Rica	Kansas City, Missouri
18:30 UTC−05	Wolff 70'			Stadium: Arrowhead Stadium; Attendance: 37,319; Referee: Jorge Larrionda (Uruguay)

June 7 Friendly	United States	0–0	Ecuador	Columbus, Ohio
20:00 UTC−04				Stadium: Columbus Crew Stadium; Attendance: 12,572; Referee: Jose Farias (Canada)

June 16 WCQ F	Jamaica	0–0	United States	Kingston, Jamaica
13:00 UTC−05				Stadium: Independence Park; Attendance: 35,000; Referee: Ubaldo Aquino (Paraguay)

June 20 WCQ F	United States	2–0	Trinidad and Tobago	Foxborough, Massachusetts
19:30 UTC−04	Razov 2'; Stewart 20'			Stadium: Foxboro Stadium; Attendance: 31,211; Referee: Ali Bujsaim (United Arab Emirates)

July 1 WCQ F	Mexico	1–0	United States	Mexico City, Mexico
12:00 UTC−05	Borgetti 16'			Stadium: Estadio Azteca; Attendance: 110,000; Referee: Kim Young-Joo (South Korea)

September 1 WCQ F	United States	2–3	Honduras	Washington, D.C.
10:00 UTC−04	Stewart 7', 84'		Núñez 28', 77'; Pavón 53' (pen.)	Stadium: RFK Stadium; Attendance: 54,282; Referee: Mauricio Navarro (Canada)

September 5 WCQ F	Costa Rica	2–0	United States	San José, Costa Rica
20:00 UTC−06	Fonseca 40' (pen.), 68'			Stadium: Estadio Ricardo Saprissa; Attendance: 24,000; Referee: Carlos Batres (Guatemala)

October 7 WCQ F	United States	2–1	Jamaica	Foxborough, Massachusetts
14:00 UTC−04	Moore 4', 81' (pen.)		Lawrence 14'	Stadium: Foxboro Stadium; Attendance: 40,483; Referee: Rodolfo Sibrian (El Salvador)

November 11 WCQ F	Trinidad and Tobago	0–0	United States	Port of Spain, Trinidad and Tobago
15:00 UTC−04				Stadium: Hasely Crawford Stadium; Attendance: 5,000; Referee: Peter Prendergast (Jamaica)

December 9 Friendly	South Korea	1–0	United States	Seogwipo, South Korea
	Yoo 23'			Stadium: Jeju World Cup Stadium; Attendance: 42,256; Referee: Naotsugu Fuse (Japan)

== 2002 ==
Wins	Losses	Draws
12	6	2

Win Draw Loss

January 19 Gold Cup GS	United States	2–1	South Korea	Pasadena, California
	Donovan 35'; Beasley 90+3'		Song 38'; Choi (red card) 56'	Stadium: Rose Bowl; Attendance: 42,117; Referee: Samuel Richard (Dominican Republic)

January 21 Gold Cup GS	United States	1–0	Cuba	Pasadena, California
18:00 UTC−08	McBride 22' (pen.)			Stadium: Rose Bowl; Attendance: 31,244; Referee: Jose Pineda (Honduras)

January 27 Gold Cup QF	United States	4–0	El Salvador	Pasadena, California
15:00 UTC−08	McBride 9', 11', 21'; Razov 72'		Benítez (yellow card) 40' (yellow-red card) 64'	Stadium: Rose Bowl; Attendance: 31,628; Referee: Samuel Richard (Dominican Republic)

January 30 Gold Cup SF	United States	0–0 (a.e.t.) (4–2 p)	Canada	Pasadena, California
20:30 UTC−08				Stadium: Rose Bowl; Attendance: 7,241; Referee: Peter Prendergast (Jamaica)
	Penalties
	Donovan (penalty scored); McBride (penalty scored); Agoos (penalty scored); Mathis (penalty scored)		McKenna (penalty missed); Stalteri (penalty scored); De Rosario (penalty scored); Nsaliwa (penalty missed)

February 2 Gold Cup F	United States	2–0	Costa Rica	Pasadena, California
12:00 UTC−08	Wolff 37'; Agoos 63'			Stadium: Rose Bowl; Attendance: 14,432; Referee: Carlos Batres (Guatemala)

February 13 Friendly	Italy	1–0	United States	Catania, Italy
20:45 UTC+01	Del Piero 62'			Stadium: Stadio Cibali; Attendance: 25,493; Referee: Joseph Attard (Malta)

March 2 Friendly	United States	4–0	Honduras	Seattle, Washington
13:00 UTC−08	Mathis 14', 59'; Donovan 44', 67'			Stadium: Safeco Field; Attendance: 38,534; Referee: Jerry Proctor (Canada)

March 10 Friendly	United States	1–0	Ecuador	Birmingham, Alabama
15:00 UTC−06	Lewis 21'; Mathis (yellow card) 39' (yellow-red card) 58'			Stadium: Legion Field; Attendance: 38,534; Referee: Jerry Proctor (Canada)

March 27 Friendly	Germany	4–2	United States	Rostock, Germany
20:45 UTC+01	Ziege 44'; Neuville 61'; Bierhoff 65'; Frings 68'		Mathis 17', 71'	Stadium: Ostseestadion; Attendance: 28,835; Referee: Berhard Brutger (Austria)

April 3 Friendly	United States	1–0	Mexico	Denver, Colorado
20:00 UTC−07	Mathis 66'; Hejduk (red card) 90'		García Aspe (red card) 90'	Stadium: Invesco Field at Mile High; Attendance: 48,476; Referee: Clive Wright (Jamaica)

April 17 Friendly	Republic of Ireland	2–1	United States	Dublin, Ireland
19:30 GMT	Kinsella 7'; Doherty 83'		Pope 34'	Stadium: Lansdowne Road; Attendance: 39,000; Referee: Philippe Leuba (Switzerland)

May 12 Friendly	United States	2–1	Uruguay	Washington, D.C.
14:00 UTC−04	Sanneh 6'; Beasley 40'		Abreu 60'	Stadium: RFK Stadium; Attendance: 30,413; Referee: Fredy Escobar (Guatemala)

May 16 Friendly	United States	5–0	Jamaica	East Rutherford, New Jersey
19:30 UTC−04	Wolff 32', 60'; Mathis 47'; Donovan 84'; Beasley 90+2'			Stadium: Giants Stadium; Attendance: 30,659; Referee: José Martínez (Canada)

May 19 Friendly	United States	0–2	Netherlands	Foxborough, Massachusetts
14:00 UTC−04			Makaay 45' van der Meyde 76'	Stadium: CMGI Field; Attendance: 36,778; Referee: Benito Archundia (Mexico)

June 5 World Cup GS	United States	3–2	Portugal	Suwon, South Korea
18:00 UTC+09	O'Brien 4'; Costa 29' (o.g.); McBride 36'		Beto 39'; Agoos 71' (o.g.)	Stadium: Suwon World Cup Stadium; Attendance: 37,306; Referee: Byron Moreno (Ecuador)

June 10 World Cup GS	South Korea	1–1	United States	Daegu, South Korea
15:30 UTC+09	Ahn 78'		Mathis 24'	Stadium: Daegu World Cup Stadium; Attendance: 60,778; Referee: Urs Meier (Switzerland)

June 14 World Cup GS	United States	1–3	Poland	Daejeon, South Korea
20:30 UTC+09	Donovan 83'		Olisadebe 3'; Kryszalowicz 5'; Żewłakow 66'	Stadium: Daejeon World Cup Stadium; Attendance: 26,482; Referee: Jun Lu (China)

June 17 World Cup R16	United States	2–0	Mexico	Jeonju, South Korea
15:30 UTC+09	McBride 8'; Donovan 65'		Márquez (red card) 88'	Stadium: Jeonju World Cup Stadium; Attendance: 36,380; Referee: Vítor Melo Pereira (Portugal)

June 21 World Cup QF	United States	0–1	Germany	Ulsan, South Korea
20:30 UTC+09			Ballack 39'	Stadium: Ulsan Munsu Stadium; Attendance: 37,337; Referee: Hugh Dallas (Scotland)

November 17 Friendly	United States	2–0	El Salvador	Washington, D.C.
15:00 UTC−05	Olsen 31'; Victorine 60'			Stadium: RFK Stadium; Attendance: 13,590; Referee: Peter Prendergast (Jamaica)

== 2003 ==
Wins	Losses	Draws
10	4	2

Win Draw Loss

January 18 Friendly	United States	4–0	Canada	Fort Lauderdale, Florida
19:30 UTC−05	Bocanegra 7'; Mathis 31'; Klein 32'; Ralston 61'			Stadium: Lockhart Stadium; Attendance: 6,549; Referee: Rodolfo Sibrian (El Salvador)

February 8 Friendly	United States	0–1	Argentina	Miami, Florida
11:55 UTC−05			González 9'; D'Alessandro (yellow card) 13' (yellow-red card) 90+1'	Stadium: Orange Bowl; Attendance: 27,196; Referee: Carlos Batres (Guatemala)

February 12 Friendly	Jamaica	1–2	United States	Kingston, Jamaica
19:00 UTC−05	Lowe 52'		Bocanegra 11'; Klein 12'	Stadium: Independence Park; Attendance: 27,000; Referee: Godfrey Bowen (Cayman Islands)

March 29 Friendly	United States	2–0	Venezuela	Seattle, Washington
13:00 UTC−08	Kirovski 52'; Donovan 76'		Angelucci (red card) 86'	Stadium: Seahawks Stadium; Attendance: 17,819; Referee: Mike Seifert (Canada)

May 8 Friendly	United States	0–0	Mexico	Houston, Texas
18:55 UTC−05				Stadium: Reliant Stadium; Attendance: 69,582; Referee: Peter Prendergast (Jamaica)

May 26 Friendly	United States	2–0	Wales	San Jose, California
19:00 UTC−08	Donovan 41' (pen.); Lewis 59'		Jones (yellow card) 39' (yellow-red card) 48'	Stadium: Spartan Stadium; Attendance: 12,282; Referee: Benito Archundia (Mexico)

June 8 Friendly	United States	2–1	New Zealand	Richmond, Virginia
13:00 UTC−04	Klein 20'; Kirovski 65'		Coveny 65'	Stadium: University of Richmond Stadium; Attendance: 9,116; Referee: Hi Liu (Canada)

June 19 Confederations Cup GS	United States	1–2	Turkey	Saint-Étienne, France
19:00 UTC+02	Beasley 37'		Yılmaz 40' (pen.); Tuncay 71'	Stadium: Stade Geoffroy-Guichard; Attendance: 16,944; Referee: Jorge Larrionda (Uruguay)

June 21 Confederations Cup GS	United States	0–1	Brazil	Lyon, France
21:00 UTC+02			Adriano 22'	Stadium: Stade de Gerland; Attendance: 20,306; Referee: Lucílio Batista (Portugal)

June 23 Confederations Cup GS	United States	0–0	Cameroon	Lyon, France
21:00 UTC+02				Stadium: Stade de Gerland; Attendance: 19,206; Referee: Mark Shield (Austria)

July 6 Friendly	United States	2–0	Paraguay	Columbus, Ohio
15:00 UTC−04	Donovan 12'; Stewart 90+5'			Stadium: Columbus Crew Stadium; Attendance: 14,103; Referee: Mauricio Navarro (Canada)

July 12 Gold Cup GS	United States	2–0	El Salvador	Foxborough, Massachusetts
18:30 UTC−04	Lewis 28'; McBride 76'			Stadium: Gillette Stadium; Attendance: 33,652; Referee: Felipe Ramos (Mexico)

July 14 Gold Cup GS	United States	2–0	Martinique	Foxborough, Massachusetts
20:30 UTC−04	McBride 39', 43'		Girier-Dufournier (yellow card) 45' (yellow-red card) 89'	Stadium: Gillette Stadium; Attendance: 8,780; Referee: Roberto Moreno (Panama)

July 19 Gold Cup QF	United States	5–0	Cuba	Foxborough, Massachusetts
15:00 UTC−04	Donovan 22', 25', 55', 76'; Ralston 42'		Fernández (red card) 43'	Stadium: Gillette Stadium; Attendance: 15,627; Referee: Peter Prendergast (Jamaica)

July 23 Gold Cup SF	United States	1–2 (a.e.t.)	Brazil	Miami, Florida
20:00 UTC−04	Bocanegra 62'; Gibbs (red card) 98'		Kaká 89'; Diego 100' (pen.)	Stadium: Orange Bowl; Attendance: 35,211; Referee: Carlos Batres (Guatemala)

July 26 Gold Cup 3rd	United States	3–2	Costa Rica	Miami, Florida
20:00 UTC−04	Bocanegra 29'; Stewart 56'; Convey 67'		Fonseca 24', 39'	Stadium: Orange Bowl; Attendance: 5,093; Referee: Richard Piper (Trinidad & Tobago)

== 2004 ==
Wins	Losses	Draws
8	1	6

Win Draw Loss

January 18 Friendly	United States	1–1	Denmark	Carson, California
12:30 UTC−08	Donovan 77' (pen.)	Report	Røll 28' (pen.); Stokholm (yellow card) 46' (yellow-red card) 84'	Stadium: Home Depot Center; Attendance: 10,461; Referee: Antonio Rodriguez Mendoza (Mexico)

February 18 Friendly	Netherlands	1–0	United States	Amsterdam, Netherlands
20:30 UTC+01	Robben 57'	Report		Stadium: Amsterdam Arena; Attendance: 29,700; Referee: Tom Henning Øvrebø (Norway)

March 13 Friendly	United States	1–1	Haiti	Miami, Florida
20:00 UTC−05	Califf 90'	Report	Boucicaut 72'	Stadium: Orange Bowl; Attendance: 8,714; Referee: Peter Prendergast (Jamaica)

March 31 Friendly	Poland	0–1	United States	Płock, Poland
19:45 UTC+02		Report	Beasley 27'	Stadium: Kazimierz Górski Stadium; Attendance: 10,500; Referee: Tommy Skjerven (Norway)

April 28 Friendly	United States	1–0	Mexico	Dallas, Texas
19:30 UTC−05	Pope 90+3'			Stadium: Cotton Bowl; Attendance: 45,048; Referee: Mauricio Navarro (Canada)

June 2 Friendly	United States	4–0	Honduras	Foxborough, Massachusetts
13:30 UTC−04	McBride 22', 37'; Lewis 77'; Sanneh 81'	Report	Guevara (red card) 40'	Stadium: Gillette Stadium; Attendance: 11,533; Referee: Rodolfo Sibrian (El Salvador)

June 13 WCQ R2	United States	3–0	Grenada	Columbus, Ohio
13:00 UTC−04	Beasley 45+1', 70'; Vanney 90+3'			Stadium: Columbus Crew Stadium; Attendance: 9,137; Referee: Mauricio Navarro (Canada)

June 20 WCQ R2	Grenada	2–3	United States	St. George's, Grenada
13:00 UTC−04	Roberts 12' (pen.); Charles 78'; Benjamin (yellow card) 18' (yellow-red card) 54'		Donovan 6'; Wolff 19'; Beasley 77'	Stadium: Grenada National Stadium; Attendance: 15,267; Referee: Neal Brizan (Trinidad & Tobago)

July 11 Friendly	United States	1–1	Poland	Chicago, Illinois
15:00 UTC−05	Bocanegra 88'	Report	Wlodarczyk 76'	Stadium: Soldier Field; Attendance: 39,529; Referee: Jean-François Corrivault (Canada)

August 18 WCQ R3	Jamaica	1–1	United States	Kingston, Jamaica
19:00 UTC−04	Goodison 49'	Report	Ching 89'	Stadium: Independence Park; Attendance: 30,000; Referee: William Mattus (Costa Rica)

September 4 WCQ R3	United States	2–0	El Salvador	Foxborough, Massachusetts
16:00 UTC−04	Ching 5'; Donovan 69'	Report	Alas (yellow card) 8' (yellow-red card) 27'	Stadium: Gillette Stadium; Attendance: 25,266; Referee: Neal Brizan (Trinidad & Tobago)

September 8 WCQ R3	Panama	1–1	United States	Panama City, Panama
20:00 UTC−05	Brown 69'		Jones 90+2'	Stadium: Estadio Rommel Fernández; Attendance: 15,000; Referee: Marco Rodríguez (Mexico)

October 9 WCQ R3	El Salvador	0–2	United States	San Salvador, El Salvador
19:00 UTC−06		Report	McBride 29'; Johnson 75'	Stadium: Estadio Cuscatlán; Attendance: 20,000; Referee: Carlos Batres (Guatemala)

October 13 WCQ R3	United States	6–0	Panama	Washington, D.C.
19:30 UTC−04	Donovan 21', 57'; Johnson 70', 84', 87'; Torres 90' (o.g.)			Stadium: RFK Stadium; Attendance: 22,000; Referee: Ramesh Ramdhan (Trinidad & Tobago)

November 17 WCQ R3	United States	1–1	Jamaica	Columbus, Ohio
19:30 UTC−05	Johnson 15'; Onyewu (yellow card) 64' (yellow-red card) 73'	Report	Williams 28' (pen.)	Stadium: Columbus Crew Stadium; Attendance: 9,088; Referee: Mauricio Navarro (Canada)

== 2005 ==
Wins	Losses	Draws
13	3	4

Win Draw Loss

February 9 WCQ R4	Trinidad and Tobago	1–2	United States	Port of Spain, Trinidad and Tobago
15:30 UTC−04	Eve 89'		Johnson 30'; Lewis 54'	Stadium: Queen's Park Oval; Attendance: 11,000; Referee: Benito Archundia (Mexico)

March 9 Friendly	United States	3–0	Colombia	Fullerton, California
	Noonan 25'; Marshall 33'; Mathis 66'; Twellman (red card) 76'			Stadium: Titan Stadium; Attendance: 7,086; Referee: Marco Rodríguez (Mexico)

March 19 Friendly	United States	1–0	Honduras	Albuquerque, New Mexico
14:00 UTC−07	Johnson 45'			Stadium: University Stadium; Attendance: 9,222; Referee: Mauricio Navarro (Canada)

March 27 WCQ R4	Mexico	2–1	United States	Mexico City, Mexico
12:00 UTC−06	Borgetti 30'; Naelson 33'		Lewis 59'	Stadium: Estadio Azteca; Attendance: 110,000; Referee: Rodolfo Sibrian (El Salvador)

March 30 WCQ R4	United States	2–0	Guatemala	Birmingham, Alabama
19:00 UTC−06	Johnson 11'; Ralston 68'			Stadium: Legion Field; Attendance: 31,624; Referee: Ramesh Ramdhan (Trinidad & Tobago)

May 28 Friendly	United States	1–2	England	Chicago, Illinois
14:06 UTC−05	Dempsey 79'		Richardson 4', 44'	Stadium: Soldier Field; Attendance: 47,637; Referee: Benito Archundia (Mexico)

June 4 WCQ R4	United States	3–0	Costa Rica	Salt Lake City, Utah
17:30 UTC−06	Donovan 6', 62'; McBride 87'		Sequeira (red card) 90+2'	Stadium: Rice-Eccles Stadium; Attendance: 40,586; Referee: Carlos Batres (Guatemala)

June 8 WCQ R4	Panama	0–3	United States	Panama City, Panama
21:30 UTC−04			Bocanegra 6'; Donovan 20'; McBride 40'	Stadium: Estadio Rommel Fernández; Attendance: 17,000; Referee: Mauricio Navarro (Canada)

July 7 Gold Cup GS	United States	4–1	Cuba	Seattle, Washington
19:30 UTC−07	Dempsey 45'; Donovan 87', 90+2'; Beasley 90'		Moré 18'; Colome (red card) 50'	Stadium: Qwest Field; Attendance: 15,831; Referee: José Pineda (Honduras)

July 9 Gold Cup GS	United States	2–0	Canada	Seattle, Washington
12:30 UTC−07	Hutchinson 48' (o.g.); Donovan 90'		Serioux (yellow card) 25' (yellow-red card) 82'	Stadium: Qwest Field; Attendance: 15,109; Referee: Neal Brizan (Trinidad & Tobago)

July 12 Gold Cup GS	United States	0–0	Costa Rica	Foxborough, Massachusetts
19:30 UTC−04				Stadium: Gillette Stadium; Attendance: 15,211; Referee: Benito Archundia (Mexico)

July 16 Gold Cup QF	United States	3–1	Jamaica	Foxborough, Massachusetts
19:30 UTC−04	Wolff 6'; Beasley 42', 83'; Olsen (red card) 58'		Taylor (red card) 66'; Fuller 88'	Stadium: Gillette Stadium; Attendance: 22,108; Referee: Carlos Batres (Guatemala)

July 21 Gold Cup SF	United States	2–1	Honduras	East Rutherford, New Jersey
18:00 UTC−04	O'Brien 86'; Onyewu 90+2'		Guerrero 30'	Stadium: Giants Stadium; Attendance: 41,721; Referee: Peter Prendergast (Jamaica)

July 24 Gold Cup F	United States	0–0 (a.e.t.) (3–1 p)	Panama	East Rutherford, New Jersey
15:00 UTC−04				Stadium: Giants Stadium; Attendance: 31,018; Referee: Carlos Batres (Guatemala)
	Penalties
	Quaranta (penalty scored); Armas (penalty missed); Donovan (penalty scored); Davis (penalty scored)		Tejada (penalty missed); Dely Valdés (penalty missed); Baloy (penalty scored); Blanco (penalty missed)

August 17 WCQ R4	United States	1–0	Trinidad and Tobago	East Hartford, Connecticut
20:00 UTC−04	McBride 2'; Convey (yellow card) 31' (yellow-red card) 88'		Lawrence (red card) 41'	Stadium: Rentschler Field; Attendance: 25,488; Referee: Marco Rodríguez (Mexico)

September 3 WCQ R4	United States	2–0	Mexico	Columbus, Ohio
19:30 UTC−04	Ralston 53'; Beasley 58'			Stadium: Columbus Crew Stadium; Attendance: 24,685; Referee: Carlos Batres (Guatemala)

September 7 WCQ R4	Guatemala	0–0	United States	Guatemala City, Guatemala
21:00 UTC−06				Stadium: Estadio Mateo Flores; Attendance: 27,000; Referee: Marco Rodríguez (Mexico)

October 8 WCQ R4	Costa Rica	3–0	United States	San José, Costa Rica
14:00 UTC−06	Wanchope 34'; Hernández 60', 88'			Stadium: Estadio Ricardo Saprissa; Attendance: 30,000; Referee: Benito Archundia (Mexico)

October 12 WCQ R4	United States	2–0	Panama	Foxborough, Massachusetts
18:58 UTC−04	Martino 51'; Twellman 57'			Stadium: Gillette Stadium; Attendance: 9,192; Referee: Gilberto Alcalá (Mexico)

November 12 Friendly	Scotland	1–1	United States	Glasgow, Scotland
16:00 UTC−0	Webster 37'		Wolff 9' (pen.)	Stadium: Hampden Park; Attendance: 26,708; Referee: Alberto Undiano Mallenco (Spain)

== 2006 ==
Wins	Losses	Draws
6	4	3

Win Draw Loss

January 22 Friendly	United States	0–0	Canada	San Diego, California
17:00 UTC−08				Stadium: Torero Stadium; Attendance: 6,077; Referee: Benito Archundia (Mexico)

January 29 Friendly	United States	5–0	Norway	Carson, California
14:00 UTC−08	Twellman 5', 17', 76'; Pope 67'; Klein 87'			Stadium: Home Depot Center; Attendance: 16,366; Referee: Óscar Ruiz (Colombia)

February 10 Friendly	United States	3–2	Japan	San Francisco, California
20:00 UTC−08	Pope 24'; Dempsey 39'; Twellman 50'		Maki 60'; Nakazawa 90'	Stadium: SBC Park; Attendance: 37,365; Referee: Horacio Elizondo (Argentina)

February 19 Friendly	United States	4–0	Guatemala	Frisco, Texas
13:00 UTC−06	Olsen 38'; Ching 45'; Johnson 47'; Klein 71'			Stadium: Pizza Hut Park; Attendance: 14,453; Referee: Mauricio Navarro (Canada)

March 1 Friendly	United States	1–0	Poland	Kaiserslautern, Germany
20:00 UTC+01	Dempsey 49'			Stadium: Fritz-Walter-Stadion; Attendance: 13,395; Referee: Thorsten Kinhofer (Germany)

March 22 Friendly	Germany	4–1	United States	Dortmund, Germany
20:30 UTC+01	Schweinsteiger 46'; Neuville 73'; Klose 75'; Ballack 79'		Cherundolo 85'	Stadium: Signal Iduna Park; Attendance: 64,500; Referee: Peter Frojdfeldt (Sweden)

April 11 Friendly	United States	1–1	Jamaica	Cary, North Carolina
15:00 UTC−04	Olsen 27'		Bennett 4'	Stadium: SAS Soccer Park; Attendance: 8,093; Referee: Jorge Gasso Flores (Mexico)

May 23 Friendly	United States	0–1	Morocco	Nashville, Tennessee
18:00 UTC−06		Report	Madihi 90'	Stadium: Nashville Coliseum; Attendance: 26,141; Referee: Mauricio Navarro (Canada)

May 26 Friendly	United States	2–0	Venezuela	Cleveland, Ohio
19:00 UTC−05	Ching 36'; Dempsey 69'; Bocanegra (yellow card) 45' (yellow-red card) 82'			Stadium: Cleveland Browns Stadium; Attendance: 29,745; Referee: Mauricio Morales Valle (Mexico)

May 28 Friendly	United States	1–0	Latvia	East Hartford, Connecticut
19:00 UTC−05	McBride 43'			Stadium: Rentschler Field; Attendance: 24,636; Referee: Steven Dipiero (Canada)

June 12 World Cup GS	United States	0–3	Czech Republic	Gelsenkirchen, Germany
18:00 UTC+02			Koller 5'; Rosický 36', 76'	Stadium: Arena AufSchalke; Attendance: 52,000; Referee: Carlos Amarilla (Paraguay)

June 17 World Cup GS	United States	1–1	Italy	Kaiserslautern, Germany
21:00 UTC+02	Zaccardo 27' (o.g.); Mastroeni (red card) 45'; Pope (yellow card) 21' (yellow-red card) 47'		Gilardino 22'; De Rossi (red card) 28'	Stadium: Fritz-Walter-Stadion; Attendance: 46,000; Referee: Jorge Larrionda (Uruguay)

June 22 World Cup GS	United States	1–2	Ghana	Nuremberg, Germany
16:00 UTC+02	Dempsey 43'		Dramani 22'; Appiah 45+2' (pen.)	Stadium: Frankenstadion; Attendance: 41,000; Referee: Markus Merk (Germany)

== 2007 ==
Wins	Losses	Draws
12	5	1

Win Draw Loss

January 20 Friendly	United States	3–1	Denmark	Carson, California
14:00 UTC−08	Donovan 44' (pen.); Bornstein 57'; Cooper 80'		Sørensen 37'	Stadium: Home Depot Center; Attendance: 10,048; Referee: Mauricio Navarro (Canada)

February 7 Friendly	United States	2–0	Mexico	Glendale, Arizona
19:25 UTC−07	Conrad 52'; Donovan 90+1'			Stadium: University of Phoenix Stadium; Attendance: 62,462; Referee: Mauricio Navarro (Canada)

March 25 Friendly	United States	3–1	Ecuador	Tampa, Florida
12:00 UTC−04	Donovan 1', 66', 67'		Caicedo 11'	Stadium: Raymond James Stadium; Attendance: 31,547; Referee: Silviu Petrescu (Canada)

March 28 Friendly	United States	0–0	Guatemala	Frisco, Texas
20:00 UTC−05				Stadium: Pizza Hut Park; Attendance: 10,932; Referee: Benito Archundia (Mexico)

June 2 Friendly	United States	4–1	China	San Jose, California
17:00 UTC−07	Beasley 10'; Feilhaber 28'; Dempsey 72'; Onyewu 79'		Zhang 15'	Stadium: Spartan Stadium; Attendance: 20,821; Referee: Hugo Gualaro (Mexico)

June 7 Gold Cup GS	United States	1–0	Guatemala	Carson, California
18:00 UTC−07	Dempsey 26'; Onyewu (yellow card) 56' (yellow-red card) 73'			Stadium: Home Depot Center; Attendance: 21,334; Referee: Jose Pineda (Honduras)

June 9 Gold Cup GS	United States	2–0	Trinidad and Tobago	Carson, California
14:00 UTC−07	Ching 29'; Johnson 54'			Stadium: Home Depot Center; Attendance: 27,000; Referee: Robert Moreno (Panama)

June 12 Gold Cup GS	United States	4–0	El Salvador	Foxborough, Massachusetts
17:00 UTC−04	Beasley 34', 89'; Donovan 45+4' (pen.); Twellman 73'			Stadium: Gillette Stadium; Attendance: 26,523; Referee: Benito Archundia (Mexico)

June 16 Gold Cup QF	United States	2–1	Panama	Foxborough, Massachusetts
16:00 UTC−04	Donovan 60' (pen.); Bocanegra 62'		Torres (yellow card) 16' (yellow-red card) 76'; Pérez 85'	Stadium: Gillette Stadium; Attendance: 22,412; Referee: Neal Brizan (Trinidad & Tobago)

June 21 Gold Cup SF	United States	2–1	Canada	Chicago, Illinois
18:00 UTC−05	Hejduk 39'; Donovan 45+1' (pen.); Bradley (red card) 86'		Hume 76'	Stadium: Soldier Field; Attendance: 50,760; Referee: Benito Archundia (Mexico)

June 24 Gold Cup F	United States	2–1	Mexico	Chicago, Illinois
14:00 UTC−05	Donovan 62' (pen.); Feilhaber 73'		Guardado 44'	Stadium: Soldier Field; Attendance: 60,000; Referee: Carlos Batres (Guatemala)

June 28 Copa América GS	United States	1–4	Argentina	Maracaibo, Venezuela
20:50 UTC−04:30	Johnson 9' (pen.)		Crespo 11' 60'; Aimar 76'; Tevez 84'	Stadium: Estadio José Pachencho Romero; Attendance: 34,500; Referee: Carlos Chandía (Chile)

July 2 Copa América GS	United States	1–3	Paraguay	Barinas, Venezuela
18:35 UTC−04:30	Clark 35'		Barreto 29'; Cardozo 56'; Cabañas 90+2'	Stadium: Estadio Agustín Tovar; Attendance: 28,200; Referee: Víctor Hugo Rivera (Peru)

July 5 Copa América GS	United States	0–1	Colombia	Barquisimeto, Venezuela
18:35 UTC−04:30			Castrillón 15'	Stadium: Estadio Metropolitano de Fútbol de Lara; Attendance: 37,500; Referee: Manuel Andarcia (Venezuela)

August 22 Friendly	Sweden	1–0	United States	Gothenburg, Sweden
19:30 UTC+02	Källström 56'			Stadium: Ullevi; Attendance: 20,648; Referee: Kevin Blom (Netherlands)

September 9 Friendly	United States	2–4	Brazil	Chicago, Illinois
16:00 UTC−05	Bocanegra 21'; Dempsey 73'		Onyewu 33' (o.g.); Lúcio 53'; Ronaldinho 75'; Elano 90+2' (pen.)	Stadium: Soldier Field; Attendance: 43,543; Referee: Benito Archundia (Mexico)

October 17 Friendly	Switzerland	0–1	United States	Basel, Switzerland
20:30 UTC+02			86' Bradley	Stadium: St. Jakob-Park; Attendance: 16,500; Referee: Frank De Bleeckere (Belgium)

November 17 Friendly	South Africa	0–1	United States	Johannesburg, South Africa
16:00 UTC+02			27' Cherundolo	Stadium: Ellis Park Stadium; Attendance: 30,000; Referee: Eddie Maillet (Seychelles)

== 2008 ==
Wins	Losses	Draws
9	3	2

Win Draw Loss

January 19 Friendly	United States	2–0	Sweden	Carson, California
17:30 UTC−08	Robinson 15'; Donovan 48'			Stadium: Home Depot Center; Attendance: 14,878; Referee: Mauricio Navarro (Canada)

February 6 Friendly	United States	2–2	Mexico	Houston, Texas
20:25 UTC−05	Onyewu 29'; Altidore 40'		Magallón 35', 47'	Stadium: Reliant Stadium; Attendance: 70,103; Referee: Carlos Batres (Guatemala)

March 26 Friendly	Poland	0–3	United States	Kraków, Poland
20:30 UTC+01			Bocanegra 12'; Onyewu 35'; Lewis 73'	Stadium: Stadion Miejski im. Henryka Reymana; Attendance: 20,000; Referee: Anders Hermansen (Denmark)

May 28 Friendly	England	2–0	United States	London, England
20:00 UTC+0	Terry 38'; Gerrard 59'			Stadium: Wembley Stadium; Attendance: 71,233; Referee: Kyros Vassaras (Denmark)

June 4 Friendly	Spain	1–0	United States	Santander, Spain
20:00 UTC+01	Xavi 79'			Stadium: Estadio El Sardinero; Attendance: 14,232; Referee: Sokol Jareci (Albania)

June 8 Friendly	United States	0–0	Argentina	East Rutherford, New Jersey
19:30 UTC−04	Mastroeni (yellow card) 60' (yellow-red card) 71'		Mascherano (yellow card) 86' (yellow-red card) 86'	Stadium: Giants Stadium; Attendance: 78,682; Referee: Joel Aguilar (El Salvador)

June 15 WCQ R2	United States	8–0	Barbados	Carson, California
14:00 UTC−07	Dempsey 1', 63'; Bradley 12'; Ching 20', 89'; Donovan 59'; Johnson 82'; Ferguson 86' (o.g.)			Stadium: Home Depot Center; Attendance: 11,476; Referee: Marco Antonio Rodriguez (Mexico)

June 22 WCQ R2	Barbados	0–1	United States	Bridgetown, Barbados
15:00 UTC−04			Lewis 21'	Stadium: Kensington Oval; Attendance: 2,000; Referee: Roberto Williams (Panama)

August 20 WCQ R3	Guatemala	0–1	United States	Guatemala City, Guatemala
20:00 UTC−06			Cherundolo (yellow card) 17' (yellow-red card) 60'; Bocanegra 69'	Stadium: Estadio Mateo Flores; Attendance: 26,000; Referee: Enrico Wijngaarde (Suriname)

September 6 WCQ R3	Cuba	0–1	United States	Havana, Cuba
20:00 UTC−04			Dempsey 40'	Stadium: Estadio Pedro Marrero; Attendance: 12,000; Referee: Joel Aguilar (El Salvador)

September 10 WCQ R3	United States	3–0	Trinidad and Tobago	Bridgeview, Illinois
19:00 UTC−05	Bradley 9'; Dempsey 18'; Ching 57'			Stadium: Toyota Park; Attendance: 11,452; Referee: Courtney Campbell (Jamaica)

October 11 WCQ R3	United States	6–1	Cuba	Washington, D.C.
19:00 UTC−04	Beasley 10', 30'; Donovan 48'; Ching 63'; Altidore 87'; Onyewu 89'		Muñoz 31'; Colomé (yellow card) 21' (yellow-red card) 41'	Stadium: RFK Stadium; Attendance: 20,249; Referee: Roberto Moreno (Panama)

October 15 WCQ R3	Trinidad and Tobago	2–1	United States	Port of Spain, Trinidad and Tobago
20:00 UTC−04	Latapy 61'; Yorke 79' (pen.)		Davies 75'	Stadium: Hasely Crawford Stadium; Attendance: 19,000; Referee: Wálter Quesada (Costa Rica)

November 19 WCQ R3	United States	2–0	Guatemala	Commerce City, Colorado
18:10 UTC−07	Cooper 54'; Adu 69'			Stadium: Dick's Sporting Goods Park; Attendance: 9,303; Referee: Benito Archundia (Mexico)

== 2009 ==
Wins	Losses	Draws
13	8	3

Win Draw Loss

January 24 Friendly	United States	3–2	Sweden	Carson, California
17:30 UTC−08	Kljestan 17', 40' (pen.), 74'		Nannskog 73'; Dahlberg 89'	Stadium: Home Depot Center; Attendance: 9,918; Referee: Silviu Petrescu (Canada)

February 11 WCQ R4	United States	2–0	Mexico	Columbus, Ohio
19:00 UTC−05	Bradley 43', 90+2'			Stadium: Columbus Crew Stadium; Attendance: 23,776; Referee: Carlos Batres (Guatemala)

March 28 WCQ R4	El Salvador	2–2	United States	San Salvador, El Salvador
19:00 UTC−06	Quintanilla 15'; Castillo 72'		Altidore 77'; Hejduk 88'	Stadium: Estadio Cuscatlán; Attendance: 30,500; Referee: Benito Archundia (Mexico)

April 1 WCQ R4	United States	3–0	Trinidad and Tobago	Nashville, Tennessee
18:45 UTC−06	Altidore 13', 71', 89'			Stadium: LP Field; Attendance: 27,959; Referee: Roberto Moreno (Panama)

June 3 WCQ R4	Costa Rica	3–1	United States	San José, Costa Rica
20:05 UTC−06	Saborío 2'; Borges 13'; Herrera 69'		Donovan 90+2' (pen.)	Stadium: Estadio Ricardo Saprissa; Attendance: 19,200; Referee: Neal Brizan (Trinidad & Tobago)

June 6 WCQ R4	United States	2–1	Honduras	Chicago, Illinois
19:30 UTC−05	Donovan 43' (pen.); Bocanegra 68'		Costly 5'	Stadium: Soldier Field; Attendance: 55,647; Referee: Mauricio Morales (Mexico)

June 15 Confederations Cup GS	United States	1–3	Italy	Pretoria, South Africa
20:30 UTC+2	Clark (red card) 33'; Donovan 41' (pen.)		Rossi 58', 90+4'; De Rossi 72'	Stadium: Loftus Versfeld Stadium; Attendance: 34,341; Referee: Pablo Pozo (Chile)

June 18 Confederations Cup GS	United States	0–3	Brazil	Pretoria, South Africa
16:00 UTC+2	Kljestan (red card) 57'		Melo 7'; Robinho 20'; Maicon 62'	Stadium: Loftus Versfeld Stadium; Attendance: 39,617; Referee: Massimo Busacca (Switzerland)

June 21 Confederations Cup GS	United States	3–0	Egypt	Rustenburg, South Africa
20:30 UTC+2	Davies 21'; Bradley 63'; Dempsey 71'			Stadium: Royal Bafokeng Stadium; Attendance: 23,140; Referee: Michael Hester (New Zealand)

June 24 Confederations Cup SF	United States	2–0	Spain	Bloemfontein, South Africa
20:30 UTC+2	Altidore 27'; Dempsey 74'; Bradley (red card) 87'			Stadium: Free State Stadium; Attendance: 35,369; Referee: Jorge Larrionda (Uruguay)

June 28 Confederations Cup F	United States	2–3	Brazil	Johannesburg, South Africa
20:30 UTC+2	Dempsey 10'; Donovan 27'		Luís Fabiano 46', 74'; Lúcio 84'	Stadium: Ellis Park Stadium; Attendance: 52,291; Referee: Martin Hansson (Sweden)

July 4 Gold Cup GS	United States	4–0	Grenada	Seattle, Washington
18:00 UTC−07	Adu 7'; Holden 31'; Rogers 60'; Davies 69'	Report		Stadium: Qwest Field; Attendance: 15,387; Referee: Walter López (Guatemala)

July 8 Gold Cup GS	United States	2–0	Honduras	Washington, D.C.
21:00 UTC−04	Quaranta 74'; Ching 79'	Report		Stadium: RFK Stadium; Attendance: 26,079; Referee: Courtney Campbell (Jamaica)

July 11 Gold Cup GS	United States	2–2	Haiti	Foxborough, Massachusetts
19:00 UTC−04	Arnaud 6'; Holden 90+2'	Report	Sirin 46'; Chéry 49'	Stadium: Gillette Stadium; Attendance: 24,137; Referee: Wálter Quesada (Costa Rica)

July 18 Gold Cup QF	United States	2–1 (a.e.t.)	Panama	Philadelphia, Pennsylvania
20:00 UTC−04	Beckerman 49'; Cooper 106' (pen.)	Report	Pérez 45+1'; Baloy (yellow card) 63' (yellow-red card) 120'; Tejada (red card) 120'	Stadium: Lincoln Financial Field; Attendance: 31,087; Referee: Benito Archundia (Mexico)

July 23 Gold Cup SF	United States	2–0	Honduras	Chicago, Illinois
19:00 UTC−05	Goodson 45'; Cooper 90'	Report		Stadium: Soldier Field; Attendance: 55,173; Referee: Courtney Campbell (Jamaica)

July 26 Gold Cup F	United States	0–5	Mexico	East Rutherford, New Jersey
15:00 UTC−04	Heaps (yellow card) 24' (yellow-red card) 88'	Report	Torrado 56' (pen.); Dos Santos 62'; Vela 68'; J. Castro 78'; Franco 90'	Stadium: Giants Stadium; Attendance: 79,156; Referee: Courtney Campbell (Jamaica)

August 12 WCQ R4	Mexico	2–1	United States	Mexico City, Mexico
15:00 UTC−05	Castro 19'; Sabah 82'		Davies 9'	Stadium: Estadio Azteca; Attendance: 104,499; Referee: Roberto Moreno (Panama)

September 5 WCQ R4	United States	2–1	El Salvador	Sandy, Utah
18:00 UTC−06	Dempsey 41'; Altidore 45+2'		Castillo 32'	Stadium: Rio Tinto Stadium; Attendance: 19,066; Referee: Jose Pineda (Honduras)

September 9 WCQ R4	Trinidad and Tobago	0–1	United States	Port of Spain, Trinidad and Tobago
19:00 UTC−04			Clark 62'	Stadium: Hasely Crawford Stadium; Attendance: 4,700; Referee: Joel Aguilar (El Salvador)

October 10 WCQ R4	Honduras	2–3	United States	San Pedro Sula, Honduras
20:00 UTC−06	De León 47', 78'		Casey 55', 66'; Donovan 71'	Stadium: Estadio Olímpico Metropolitano; Attendance: 37,000; Referee: Roberto Moreno (Panama)

October 14 WCQ R4	United States	2–2	Costa Rica	Washington, D.C.
20:00 UTC−04	Bradley 72'; Bornstein 90+5'		Ruiz 21', 24'	Stadium: RFK Stadium; Attendance: 26,243; Referee: Benito Archundia (Mexico)

November 14 Friendly	Slovakia	1–0	United States	Bratislava, Slovakia
20:00 UTC+01	Hamšík 26' (pen.)			Stadium: Tehelné Pole; Attendance: 7,200; Referee: Stefan Messner (Austria)

November 18 Friendly	Denmark	3–1	United States	Aarhus, Denmark
20:40 UTC+01	Absalonsen 47'; Rieks 52'; Bernburg 57'		Cunningham 26'	Stadium: NRGi Park; Attendance: 15,172; Referee: Craig Thomson (Scotland)

== See also ==
- United States at the FIFA World Cup
- United States at the FIFA Confederations Cup
- United States at the CONCACAF Gold Cup
- United States at the Copa América
