= 2004 in American soccer =

Soccer in the United States
- Season: 2004

Men's soccer
- Supporters' Shield: Columbus Crew
- MLS Cup: D.C. United

The 2004 season was the 92nd year of competitive soccer in the United States.

== National team ==
Wins	Losses	Draws
8	1	6

The home team or the team that is designated as the home team is listed in the left column; the away team is in the right column.

Win Draw Loss

January 18 International Friendly	United States	1 – 1	Denmark	Carson, California
12:30 UTC−08	Donovan 77'	(Report)	Røll 28'	Stadium: Home Depot Center; Attendance: 10,461; Referee: Antonio Rodriguez Mendoza (Mexico)

February 18 International Friendly	Netherlands	1 – 0	United States	Amsterdam, Netherlands
20:30 UTC+01	Robben 57'	(Report)		Stadium: Amsterdam Arena; Attendance: 29,700; Referee: Tom Henning Øvrebø (Norway)

March 13 International Friendly	United States	1 – 1	Haiti	Miami, Florida
20:00 UTC−05	Califf 90'	(Report)	Boucicaut 72'	Stadium: Orange Bowl; Attendance: 8,714; Referee: Peter Prendergast (Jamaica)

March 31 International Friendly	Poland	0 – 1	United States	Płock, Poland
19:45 UTC+02		(Report)	Beasley 27'	Stadium: Kazimierz Górski Stadium; Attendance: 10,500; Referee: Tommy Skjerven (Norway)

April 29 International Friendly	United States	1 – 0	Mexico	Dallas, Texas
13:30 UTC−05	Pope 90+2'	(Report)		Stadium: Cotton Bowl; Attendance: 45,048; Referee: Mauricio Navarro (Canada)

June 2 International Friendly	United States	4 – 0	Honduras	Foxborough, Massachusetts
13:30 UTC−04	McBride 22', 37'; Lewis 77'; Sanneh 81'	(Report)		Stadium: Gillette Stadium; Attendance: 11,533; Referee: Rodolfo Sibrian (El Salvador)

June 13 World Cup Qualifying Preliminary Round	United States	3 – 0	Grenada	Columbus, Ohio
13:00 UTC−04	Beasley 45', 71'; Vanney 90'	(Report)		Stadium: Columbus Crew Stadium; Attendance: 10,000; Referee: Mauricio Navarro (Canada)

June 20 Preliminary Round	Grenada	2 – 3	United States	St. George's, Grenada
13:00 UTC−04	Roberts 12' (pen.); Charles 77'	(Report)	Donovan 6'; Wolff 19'; Beasley 76'	Stadium: Grenada National Stadium; Attendance: 10,000; Referee: Neal Brizan (Trinidad & Tobago)

July 11 International Friendly	United States	1 – 1	Poland	Chicago
15:00 UTC−05	Bocanegra 88'	(Report)	Wlodarczyk 76'	Stadium: Soldier Field; Attendance: 39,529; Referee: Jean-François Corrivault (Canada)

August 18 World Cup Qualifying Group Stage	Jamaica	1 – 1	United States	Kingston, Jamaica
19:00 UTC−04	Whitmore 51'	(Report)	Ching 89'	Stadium: National Stadium; Attendance: 27,000; Referee: William Mattus (Costa Rica)

September 4 World Cup Qualifying Group Stage	United States	2 – 0	El Salvador	Foxborough, Massachusetts
16:00 UTC−04	Ching 6'; Donovan 70'	(Report)		Stadium: Gillette Stadium; Attendance: 25,266; Referee: Neal Brizan (Trinidad & Tobago)

September 8 World Cup Qualifying Group Stage	Panama	1 – 1	United States	Panama City, Panama
20:00 UTC−05	Brown 71'	(Report)	Jones 90'	Stadium: Estadio Rommel Fernández; Attendance: 15,000; Referee: Marco Rodríguez (Mexico)

October 9 World Cup Qualifying Group Stage	El Salvador	0 – 2	United States	San Salvador, El Salvador
19:00 UTC−06		(Report)	McBride 29'; Johnson 76'	Stadium: Estadio Cuscatlán; Attendance: 20,000; Referee: Carlos Batres (Guatemala)

October 13 World Cup Qualifying Group Stage	United States	6 – 0	Panama	Washington, D.C.
19:30 UTC−04	Donovan 21', 57'; Johnson 71', 85', 88'; Torres 90' (o.g.)	(Report)		Stadium: Robert F. Kennedy Memorial Stadium; Attendance: 22,000; Referee: Ramesh Ramdhan (Trinidad & Tobago)

November 17 World Cup Qualifying Group Stage	United States	1 – 1	Jamaica	Columbus, Ohio
19:30 UTC−05	Johnson 15'	(Report)	Williams 28' (pen.)	Stadium: Columbus Crew Stadium; Attendance: 9,088; Referee: Mauricio Navarro (Canada)

== Major League Soccer ==
=== Standings ===
Position	Eastern Conference	Points	Played	Wins	Losses	Ties	Goals	Against	Difference	Average attendance
1	Columbus Crew	49	30	12	5	13	40	32	+8	16,872
2	D.C. United	42	30	11	10	9	43	42	+1	17,232
3	MetroStars	40	30	11	12	7	47	49	-2	17,195
4	New England Revolution	33	30	8	13	9	42	43	-1	12,226
5	Chicago Fire	33	30	8	13	9	36	44	-8	17,153
Position	Western Conference	Points	Played	Wins	Losses	Ties	Goals	Against	Difference	Average attendance
1	Kansas City Wizards	49	30	14	9	7	38	30	+8	14,816
2	Los Angeles Galaxy	43	30	11	9	10	42	40	+2	23,809
3	Colorado Rapids	41	30	10	9	11	29	32	-3	14,195
4	San Jose Earthquakes	38	30	9	10	11	41	35	+6	13,001
5	Dallas Burn	36	30	10	14	6	34	45	-11	9,088

=== Playoffs ===
Conference Semifinals
E1	Columbus Crew	0	1
E4	New England Revolution	1	1
Eastern Conference
E3	MetroStars	0	0
E2	D.C. United	2	2
W1	Kansas City Wizards	0	3
W4	San Jose Earthquakes	2	0
Western Conference
W3	Colorado Rapids	1	0
W2	Los Angeles Galaxy	0	2

Conference Finals
E4	New England Revolution	3(3)
E2	D.C. United	3(4) (a.e.t.)
W1	Kansas City Wizards	2
W2	Los Angeles Galaxy	0

MLS Cup 2004
E2	D.C. United	3
W1	Kansas City Wizards	2

=== MLS Cup ===
November 14
12:30 UTC−08

Kansas City Wizards	2 – 3 (a.e.t.)	D.C. United
Burciaga 6'; Wolff 58' (pen.)	(Report)	Eskandarian 19', 23'; Zotinca 26' (o.g.)

Home Depot Center, Carson, California
Attendance: 25,797
Referee: Michael Kennedy

== A-League ==
=== Standings ===
==== Eastern Conference ====
Place	Team	P	W	L	T	GF	GA	Points
1	Montreal Impact	28	17	6	5	36	15	56
2	Richmond Kickers	28	17	8	3	44	29	54
3	Syracuse Salty Dogs	28	15	8	5	40	29	50
4	Rochester Raging Rhinos	28	15	10	3	36	32	48
5	Atlanta Silverbacks	28	14	11	3	41	48	45
6	Virginia Beach Mariners	28	11	14	3	43	41	36
7	Toronto Lynx	28	10	16	2	38	50	32
8	Charleston Battery	28	7	15	6	30	39	27
9	Puerto Rico Islanders	28	5	17	6	22	48	21

==== Western Conference ====
Place	Team	P	W	L	T	GF	GA	Points
1	Portland Timbers	28	18	7	3	58	30	57
2	Vancouver Whitecaps	28	14	9	5	58	29	47
3	Minnesota Thunder	28	13	9	6	33	23	45
4	Seattle Sounders	28	13	11	4	40	34	43
5	Milwaukee Wave United	28	12	12	4	44	48	40
6	Edmonton Aviators	28	4	18	6	19	56	18
7	Calgary Mustangs	28	4	18	6	30	51	18

=== Playoffs ===
Quarterfinals
Montreal Impact	1	1	2
Rochester Raging Rhinos	0	0	0
Syracuse Salty Dogs	2	1	3
Richmond Kickers	1	0	1
Portland Timbers	2	0	2
Seattle Sounders	1	2	3
Minnesota Thunder	0	0	0
Vancouver Whitecaps	2	1	3

Semifinals
Montreal Impact	2	1	3
Syracuse Salty Dogs	1	1	2
Seattle Sounders	1	1	2
Vancouver Whitecaps	0	1	1

Final
Montreal Impact	2
Seattle Sounders	0

=== Final ===
September 18
19:00 UTC−07

Montreal Impact	2 – 0	Seattle Sounders
Vincello 33'; Commodore 78'

Claude Robillard Sports Complex, Montreal, Quebec, Canada
Attendance: 13,648

== Pro Soccer League ==
=== Standings ===
==== Atlantic Division ====
Place	Team	P	W	L	T	GF	GA	Points
1	Pittsburgh Riverhounds	20	17	2	1	48	17	52
2	Harrisburg City Islanders	20	10	7	3	40	25	33
3	Long Island Rough Riders	20	8	11	1	31	43	25

==== Northern Division ====
Place	Team	P	W	L	T	GF	GA	Points
1	New Hampshire Phantoms	20	10	9	1	46	33	31
2	Westchester Flames	20	8	9	3	38	43	27
3	Western Mass Pioneers	20	8	10	2	34	34	26

==== Southern Division ====
Place	Team	P	W	L	T	GF	GA	Points
1	Charlotte Eagles	20	14	4	2	53	19	44
2	Wilmington Hammerheads	20	10	6	3	32	20	33
3	Northern Virginia Royals	19	3	16	0	18	64	6

==== Western Division ====
Place	Team	P	W	L	T	GF	GA	Points
1	Utah Blitzz	20	11	6	3	39	16	36
2	San Diego Gauchos	20	9	9	2	26	41	29
3	California Gold	20	2	13	5	18	46	5

=== Playoffs ===
Quarterfinals
4	Wilmington Hammerheads	2	0
5	Charlotte Eagles	3	1
2	Pittsburgh Riverhounds	4	3
7	Harrisburg City Islanders	0	1
3	San Diego Gauchos	1
6	Utah Blitzz	2

Semifinals
New Hampshire Phantoms	0
Charlotte Eagles	1
Pittsburgh Riverhounds	0
Utah Blitzz	1

Final
Charlotte Eagles	2(4)
Utah Blitzz (a.e.t.)	2(5)

=== Final ===
September 4
19:00 UTC−04

Charlotte Eagles	2 – 2 (a.e.t.)	Utah Blitzz
Faro 40'; Duka 58'		Breza 66'; Carmichael 79'
Penalties
	4 – 5

E.E. Waddell H.S. Stadium, Charlotte, North Carolina
Attendance: 3,034

== Lamar Hunt U.S. Open Cup ==
=== Bracket ===
Home teams listed on top of bracket

Third Round
PDL	Carolina	2
A-L	Atlanta (ASDET)	3
MLS	Dallas	2
A-L	Virginia Beach	0
A-L	Minnesota (ASDET)	2
PDL	Rapids Reserve	1
PSL	Utah	1
A-L	Portland	2
A-L	Richmond (ASDET)	1
PDL	Cape Cod	0
MLS	Columbus	2
A-L	Syracuse	1
A-L	Rochester	1
PDL	Fire Reserves	0
A-L	Charleston	2
PSL	Wilmington	0

Fourth Round
A-L	Atlanta	1
MLS	Kansas City	4
MLS	Dallas	3
MLS	Colorado	0
A-L	Minnesota	1
MLS	Los Angeles	0
A-L	Portland	0
MLS	San Jose	3
A-L	Richmond	2
MLS	D.C. United	1
MLS	Columbus	1
MLS	Chicago (ASDET)	2
MLS	New England	1 (1)
A-L	Rochester ASDET, PSO	1 (3)
A-L	Charleston	1
MLS	MetroStars	0

Quarterfinals
MLS	Kansas City	4
MLS	Dallas	0
A-L	Minnesota	2 (4)
MLS	San Jose (ASDET, PSO)	2 (5)
A-L	Richmond	0
MLS	Chicago	1
A-L	Rochester	0
A-L	Charleston	1

Semifinals
MLS	Kansas City	1
MLS	San Jose	0
MLS	Chicago (ASDET)	1
A-L	Charleston	0

Finals
MLS	Kansas City (ASDET)	1
MLS	Chicago	0

=== Final ===
September 22
19:30 UTC−05

Kansas City Wizards	1 – 0 (asdet)	Chicago Fire
Simutenkov 95'	(Report)

Arrowhead Stadium, Kansas City, Missouri
Attendance: 8,819
Referee: Terry Vaughn

== American clubs in international competitions ==
Club	Competition	Final round
Chicago Fire	2004 CONCACAF Champions' Cup	Semifinals
San Jose Earthquakes	2004 CONCACAF Champions' Cup	Quarterfinals

=== Chicago Fire ===
March 17 Champions Cup Quarterfinal	San Juan Jabloteh (Trinidad and Tobago)	5 – 2	(United States) Chicago Fire	Port of Spain, Trinidad & Tobago
	Glen 8', 12', 37'; Noray 52', 74'		Elcock 40' (o.g.); Mapp 88'	Stadium: Hasely Crawford Stadium; Attendance: 5,083; Referee: Peter Prendergast (Jamaica)

March 24 Champions Cup Quarterfinal	Chicago Fire (United States)	4 – 0	(Trinidad and Tobago) San Juan Jabloteh	Chicago
	Ralph 42'; Selolwane 51', 62'; Armas 90'			Stadium: Soldier Field; Attendance: 6,123; Referee: Olger Mejia (Costa Rica)

April 14 Champions Cup Semifinal	Deportivo Saprissa (Costa Rica)	2 – 0	(United States) Chicago Fire	San José, Costa Rica
	Núñez 50'; Solís 71'			Stadium: Estadio Ricardo Saprissa; Attendance: 4,126; Referee: Carlos Batres (Guatemala)

April 21 Champions Cup Semifinal	Chicago Fire (United States)	2 – 1	(Costa Rica) Deportivo Saprissa	Chicago
	Williams 55'; Curtin 86'		Solís 11'	Stadium: Soldier Field; Attendance: 7,126; Referee: Gilberto Alcalá (Mexico)

=== San Jose Earthquakes ===
March 17 Champions Cup Quarterfinal	Alajuelense (Costa Rica)	3 – 0	(United States) San Jose Earthquakes	Alajuela, Costa Rica
	Scott 11'; Ledezma 14'; Arnáez 62' (pen.)			Stadium: Estadio Alejandro Morera Soto; Referee: José Pineda (Honduras)

March 24 Champions Cup Quarterfinal	San Jose Earthquakes (United States)	1 – 0	(Costa Rica) Alajuelense	San Jose, California
	Mullan 89'			Stadium: Spartan Stadium; Attendance: 5,130; Referee: Gilberto Alcalá (Mexico)
