= 2006 FIFA World Cup qualification – CONCACAF third round =

Football tournament qualification stage

In the third round of CONCACAF, the 12 winners of the second round were divided in 3 groups of 4 teams each. Teams in each group would play against each other home-and-away, and the two teams with most points in each group would advance to the fourth round.

There were 108 goals scored in 36 matches, for an average of 3 goals per match.

== Group 1 ==
Team	Pld	W	D	L	GF	GA	GD	Pts	Qualification	(United States)	(Panama)	(Jamaica)	(El Salvador)
United States	6	3	3	0	13	3	+10	12	Fourth round	—	6–0	1–1	2–0
Panama	6	2	2	2	8	11	−3	8	Fourth round	1–1	—	1–1	3–0
Jamaica	6	1	4	1	7	5	+2	7		1–1	1–2	—	0–0
El Salvador	6	1	1	4	2	11	−9	4		0–2	2–1	0–3	—

August 18, 2004

Jamaica	1–1	United States
Goodison 49'	Report	Ching 89'

Independence Park, Kingston
Attendance: 30,000
Referee: William Mattus (Costa Rica)
August 18, 2004

El Salvador	2–1	Panama
Velásquez 7'; Rodríguez 45' (pen.)	Report	Valdés 36'

Estadio Cuscatlán, San Salvador, El Salvador
Attendance: 11,400
Referee: Mauricio Navarro (Canada)

September 4, 2004

United States	2–0	El Salvador
Ching 5'; Donovan 69'	Report

Gillette Stadium
Foxborough, United States
Attendance: 25,266
Referee: Neal Brizan (Trinidad and Tobago)
September 4, 2004

Jamaica	1–2	Panama
Ralph 77'	Report	Brown 2'; Valdés 90'

Independence Park
Kingston, Jamaica
Attendance: 24,000
Referee: Carlos Batres (Guatemala)

September 8, 2004

El Salvador	0–3	Jamaica
	Report	King 3', 38'; Hyde 40'

Estadio Cuscatlán
San Salvador, El Salvador
Attendance: 25,000
Referee: Gilberto Alcalá (Mexico)
September 8, 2004

Panama	1–1	United States
Brown 69'	Report	Jones 90+2'

Estadio Rommel Fernández
Panama City, Panama
Attendance: 15,000
Referee: Marco Rodríguez (Mexico)

October 9, 2004

El Salvador	0–2	United States
	Report	McBride 29'; Johnson 75'

Estadio Cuscatlán
San Salvador, El Salvador
Attendance: 20,000
Referee: Carlos Batres (Guatemala)
October 9, 2004

Panama	1–1	Jamaica
Brown 24'	Report	Whitmore 75'

Estadio Rommel Fernández
Panama City, Panama
Attendance: 16,000
Referee: José Pineda (Honduras)

October 13, 2004

Jamaica	0–0	El Salvador
	Report

Independence Park
Kingston, Jamaica
Attendance: 12,000
Referee: Wálter Quesada (Costa Rica)
October 13, 2004

United States	6–0	Panama
Donovan 21', 57'; Johnson 70', 84', 87'; Torres 90' (o.g.)	Report

RFK Memorial Stadium
Washington, D.C., United States
Attendance: 22,000
Referee: Ramesh Ramdhan (Trinidad and Tobago)

November 17, 2004

United States	1–1	Jamaica
Johnson 15'	Report	Williams 28' (pen.)

Columbus Crew Stadium
Columbus, United States
Attendance: 9,088
Referee: Mauricio Navarro (Canada)
November 17, 2004

Panama	3–0	El Salvador
Brown 4'; Baloy 7'; Garcés 21'	Report

Estadio Rommel Fernández
Panama City, Panama
Attendance: 9,502
Referee: Benito Archundia (Mexico)

== Group 2 ==
Team	Pld	W	D	L	GF	GA	GD	Pts	Qualification	(Costa Rica)	(Guatemala)	(Honduras)	(Canada)
Costa Rica	6	3	1	2	12	8	+4	10	Fourth round	—	5–0	2–5	1–0
Guatemala	6	3	1	2	7	9	−2	10	Fourth round	2–1	—	1–0	0–1
Honduras	6	1	4	1	9	7	+2	7		0–0	2–2	—	1–1
Canada	6	1	2	3	4	8	−4	5		1–3	0–2	1–1	—

August 18, 2004
6:00 pm

Canada	0–2	Guatemala
	Report	Ruiz 7', 59'

Swangard Stadium
Burnaby, Canada
Attendance: 6,500
Referee: Rodolfo Sibrian (El Salvador)
August 18, 2004
8:10 pm

Costa Rica	2–5	Honduras
Herron 20', 36'	Report	Suazo 22'; De León 35'; Guevara 77'; Guerrero 87'; Martínez 89'

Estadio Alejandro Morera Soto
Alajuela, Costa Rica
Attendance: 14,000
Referee: Marco Rodríguez (Mexico)

September 4, 2004

Canada	1–1	Honduras
De Vos 82'	Report	Guevara 88' (pen.)

Commonwealth Stadium
Edmonton, Canada
Attendance: 8,000
Referee: Benito Archundia (Mexico)
September 5, 2004

Guatemala	2–1	Costa Rica
Plata 58', 73'	Report	Solís 24'

Estadio Mateo Flores
Guatemala City, Guatemala
Attendance: 27,460
Referee: Kevin Stott (USA)

September 8, 2004

Honduras	2–2	Guatemala
Guevara 51'; Suazo 65'	Report	Ruiz 20'; Pezzarossi 49'

Estadio Olímpico Metropolitano
San Pedro Sula, Honduras
Attendance: 40,000
Referee: Peter Prendergast (Jamaica)
September 8, 2004

Costa Rica	1–0	Canada
Wanchope 46'	Report

Estadio Ricardo Saprissa
San José, Costa Rica
Attendance: 13,000
Referee: Ramesh Ramdhan (Trinidad and Tobago)

October 9, 2004

Honduras	1–1	Canada
Turcios 90+2'	Report	Hutchinson 73'

Estadio Olímpico Metropolitano
San Pedro Sula, Honduras
Attendance: 42,000
Referee: Kevin Stott (USA)
October 9, 2004

Costa Rica	5–0	Guatemala
Hernández 19'; Wanchope 36', 62', 69'; Fonseca 83'	Report

Estadio Ricardo Saprissa
San José, Costa Rica
Attendance: 18,000
Referee: Benito Archundia (Mexico)

October 13, 2004

Canada	1–3	Costa Rica
De Rosario 12'	Report	Wanchope 49'; Sunsing 81'; Hernández 87'

Swangard Stadium
Burnaby, Canada
Attendance: 4,000
Referee: Peter Prendergast (Jamaica)
October 13, 2004

Guatemala	1–0	Honduras
Ruiz 44'	Report

Estadio Mateo Flores
Guatemala City, Guatemala
Attendance: 26,000
Referee: Neal Brizan (Trinidad and Tobago)

November 17, 2004

Honduras	0–0	Costa Rica
	Report

Estadio Francisco Morazán
San Pedro Sula, Honduras
Attendance: 18,000
Referee: Rodolfo Sibrian (El Salvador)
November 17, 2004

Guatemala	0–1	Canada
	Report	De Rosario 57'

Estadio Mateo Flores
Guatemala City, Guatemala
Attendance: 18,000
Referee: Marco Rodríguez (Mexico)

== Group 3 ==
Team	Pld	W	D	L	GF	GA	GD	Pts	Qualification	(Mexico)	(Trinidad and Tobago)	(Saint Vincent and the Grenadines)	(Saint Kitts and Nevis)
Mexico	6	6	0	0	27	1	+26	18	Fourth round	—	3–0	7–0	8–0
Trinidad and Tobago	6	4	0	2	12	9	+3	12	Fourth round	1–3	—	2–1	5–1
Saint Vincent and the Grenadines	6	2	0	4	5	12	−7	6		0–1	0–2	—	1–0
Saint Kitts and Nevis	6	0	0	6	2	24	−22	0		0–5	1–2	0–3	—

August 18, 2004

Saint Vincent and the Grenadines	0–2	Trinidad and Tobago
	Report	McFarlane 80', 85'

Arnos Vale Stadium
Kingstown, Saint Vincent and the Grenadines
Attendance: 5,000
Referee: Terry Vaughn (USA)

September 4, 2004

Saint Kitts and Nevis	1–2	Trinidad and Tobago
Isaac 40'	Report	McFarlane 45'; John 89'

Warner Park
Basseterre, Saint Kitts and Nevis
Attendance: 2,800
Referee: Hugo Castillo (Guatemala)

September 8, 2004
8:15 pm

Trinidad and Tobago	1–3	Mexico
John 39'	Report	Arellano 1', 80'; Borgetti 19'

Hasely Crawford Stadium
Port of Spain, Trinidad and Tobago
Attendance: 20,000
Referee: Mauricio Navarro (Canada)
September 10, 2004

Saint Vincent and the Grenadines	1–0	Saint Kitts and Nevis
Jack 23'	Report

Arnos Vale Stadium
Kingstown, Saint Vincent and the Grenadines
Attendance: 4,000
Referee: Roberto Delgado (Cuba)

October 6, 2004

Mexico	7–0	Saint Vincent and the Grenadines
Borgetti 31', 68', 77', 89'; Lozano 54', 63'; Santana 81'	Report

Estadio Hidalgo
Pachuca, Mexico
Attendance: 21,000
Referee: Hu Liu (Canada)

October 10, 2004

Trinidad and Tobago	5–1	Saint Kitts and Nevis
Riley 8' (o.g.); John 24', 80'; Glenn 71'; Nixon 88'	Report	Gumbs 43' (pen.)

Manny Ramjohn Stadium
Marabella, Trinidad and Tobago
Attendance: 7,000
Referee: Ricardo Valenzuela (USA)
October 10, 2004

Saint Vincent and the Grenadines	0–1	Mexico
	Report	Borgetti 25'

Arnos Vale Stadium
Kingstown, Saint Vincent and the Grenadines
Attendance: 2,500
Referee: Nery Alfaro (El Salvador)

October 13, 2004

Saint Kitts and Nevis	0–3	Saint Vincent and the Grenadines
	Report	Velox 19', 85'; Samuel 65'

Warner Park
Basseterre, Saint Kitts and Nevis
Attendance: 500
Referee: Alfredo Whittaker (Cayman Islands)
October 13, 2004

Mexico	3–0	Trinidad and Tobago
Sinha 19'; Lozano 55', 84'	Report

Estadio Cuauhtémoc
Puebla, Mexico
Attendance: 37,000
Referee: Rodolfo Sibrian (El Salvador)

November 13, 2004

Saint Kitts and Nevis	0–5	Mexico
	Report	Altamirano 31'; Fonseca 40', 57'; Santana 49', 90+1'

Miami Orange Bowl
Miami, United States
Attendance: 18,312
Referee: Roberto Moreno (Panama)

November 17, 2004

Trinidad and Tobago	2–1	Saint Vincent and the Grenadines
Sam 84'; Eve 90+1'	Report	Haynes 49'

Hasely Crawford Stadium
Port of Spain, Trinidad and Tobago
Attendance: 10,000
Referee: Carlos Batres (Guatemala)
November 17, 2004

Mexico	8–0	Saint Kitts and Nevis
Altamirano 10' (pen.); Pérez 21', 49', 78'; Fonseca 44', 56'; Osorno 52'; Santana 67'	Report

Estadio Tecnológico
Monterrey, Mexico
Attendance: 12,000
Referee: Kevin Stott (USA)

== Goalscorers ==
There were 108 goals scored in 36 matches, for an average of 3 goals per match.

6 goals

- (Mexico national football team) Jared Borgetti

5 goals

- (Costa Rica national football team) Paulo Wanchope
- (United States men's national soccer team) Eddie Johnson

4 goals

- (Guatemala national football team) Carlos Ruiz
- (Mexico national football team) Francisco Fonseca
- (Mexico national football team) Jaime Lozano
- (Mexico national football team) Sergio Santana
- (Panama national football team) Roberto Brown
- (Trinidad and Tobago national football team) Stern John

3 goals

- (Honduras national football team) Amado Guevara
- (Mexico national football team) Luis Ernesto Pérez
- (Trinidad and Tobago national football team) Errol McFarlane
- (United States men's national soccer team) Landon Donovan

2 goals

- (Canada men's national soccer team) Dwayne De Rosario
- (Costa Rica national football team) Carlos Hernández
- (Costa Rica national football team) Andy Herron
- (Guatemala national football team) Juan Carlos Plata
- (Honduras national football team) David Suazo
- (Jamaica national football team) Marlon King
- (Mexico national football team) Hector Altamirano
- (Mexico national football team) Jesus Arellano
- (Panama national football team) Julio Dely Valdés
- (Saint Vincent and the Grenadines national football team) Kendall Velox
- (United States men's national soccer team) Brian Ching

1 goal

- (Canada men's national soccer team) Jason de Vos
- (Canada men's national soccer team) Atiba Hutchinson
- (Costa Rica national football team) Rolando Fonseca
- (Costa Rica national football team) Alonso Solís
- (Costa Rica national football team) William Sunsing
- (El Salvador national football team) Jorge Rodríguez
- (El Salvador national football team) Víctor Velásquez
- (Guatemala national football team) Dwight Pezzarossi
- (Honduras national football team) Julio César de León
- (Honduras national football team) Iván Guerrero
- (Honduras national football team) Saul Martínez
- (Honduras national football team) Danilo Turcios
- (Jamaica national football team) Ian Goodison
- (Jamaica national football team) Micah Hyde
- (Jamaica national football team) Damani Ralph
- (Jamaica national football team) Theodore Whitmore
- (Jamaica national football team) Andy Williams
- (Mexico national football team) Daniel Osorno
- (Mexico national football team) Sinha
- (Panama national football team) Felipe Baloy
- (Panama national football team) José Luis Garcés
- (Saint Kitts and Nevis national football team) Keith Gumbs
- (Saint Kitts and Nevis national football team) George Isaac
- (Saint Vincent and the Grenadines national football team) Renson Haynes
- (Saint Vincent and the Grenadines national football team) Rodney Jack
- (Saint Vincent and the Grenadines national football team) Shandel Samuel
- (Trinidad and Tobago national football team) Angus Eve
- (Trinidad and Tobago national football team) Cornell Glenn
- (Trinidad and Tobago national football team) Jerren Nixon
- (Trinidad and Tobago national football team) Hector Sam
- (United States men's national soccer team) Cobi Jones
- (United States men's national soccer team) Brian McBride

1 own goal

- (Panama national football team) José Anthony Torres (against United States)
- (Saint Kitts and Nevis national football team) Alexander Riley (against Saint Kitts and Nevis)
