= 2003 in American soccer =

Soccer in the United States
- Season: 2003

The 2003 season was the 91st year of competitive soccer in the United States.

== National team ==
Wins	Losses	Draws
10	4	2

The home team or the team that is designated as the home team is listed in the left column; the away team is in the right column.

Win Draw Loss

January 18 International Friendly	United States	4 – 0	Canada	Fort Lauderdale, Florida
19:30 UTC−05	Bocanegra 7'; Mathis 31'; Klein 32'; Ralston 61'	(Report)		Stadium: Lockhart Stadium; Attendance: 6,549; Referee: Rodolfo Sibrian (El Salvador)

February 8 International Friendly	United States	0 – 1	Argentina	Miami
11:55 UTC−05		(Report)	González 9'	Stadium: Orange Bowl; Attendance: 27,196; Referee: Carlos Batres (Guatemala)

February 12 International Friendly	Jamaica	1 – 2	United States	Kingston, Jamaica
19:00 UTC−05	Lowe 52'	(Report)	Bocanegra 11'; Klein 12'	Stadium: National Stadium; Attendance: 27,000; Referee: Godfrey Bowen (Cayman Islands)

March 29 International Friendly	United States	2 – 0	Venezuela	Seattle
13:00 UTC−08	Kirovski 52'; Donovan 76'	(Report)		Stadium: Seattle Seahawks Stadium; Attendance: 17,819; Referee: Mike Seifert (Canada)

May 8 International Friendly	United States	0 – 0	Mexico	Houston
18:55 UTC−05		(Report)		Stadium: Reliant Stadium; Attendance: 69,582; Referee: Peter Prendergast (Jamaica)

May 26 International Friendly	United States	2 – 0	Wales	San Jose, California
19:00 UTC−08	Donovan 41' (pen.); Lewis 59'	(Report)		Stadium: Spartan Stadium; Attendance: 12,282; Referee: Benito Archundia (Mexico)

June 8 International Friendly	United States	2 – 1	New Zealand	Richmond, Virginia
13:00 UTC−04	Klein 20'; Kirovski 65'	(Report)	Coveny 65'	Stadium: University of Richmond Stadium; Attendance: 9,116; Referee: Hi Liu (Canada)

June 19 Confederations Cup Group Stage	Turkey	2 – 1	United States	Saint-Étienne, France
19:00 UTC+02	Yılmaz 39' (pen.); Tuncay 70'	(Report)	Beasley 36'	Stadium: Stade Geoffroy-Guichard; Attendance: 16,944; Referee: Jorge Larrionda (Uruguay)

June 21 Confederations Cup Group Stage	Brazil	1 – 0	United States	Lyon, France
21:00 UTC+02	Adriano 22'	(Report)		Stadium: Stade de Gerland; Attendance: 20,306; Referee: Lucílio Batista (Portugal)

June 23 Confederations Cup Group Stage	United States	0 – 0	Cameroon	Lyon, France
21:00 UTC+02		(Report)		Stadium: Stade de Gerland; Attendance: 19,206; Referee: Mark Shield (Austria)

July 6 International Friendly	United States	2 – 0	Paraguay	Columbus, Ohio
15:00 UTC−04	Donovan 12'; Stewart 90+5'	(Report)		Stadium: Columbus Crew Stadium; Attendance: 14,103; Referee: Mauricio Navarro (Canada)

July 12 Gold Cup Group Stage	United States	2 – 0	El Salvador	Foxborough, Massachusetts
18:30 UTC−04	Lewis 28'; McBride 76'	(Report)		Stadium: Gillette Stadium; Attendance: 33,652; Referee: Felipe Ramos (Mexico)

July 14 Gold Cup Group Stage	Martinique	0 – 2	United States	Foxborough, Massachusetts
20:30 UTC−04		(Report)	McBride 39', 43'	Stadium: Gillette Stadium; Attendance: 8,780; Referee: Roberto Moreno (Panama)

July 19 Gold Cup Quarterfinal	United States	5 – 0	Cuba	Foxborough, Massachusetts
15:00 UTC−04	Donovan 22', 26', 55', 76'; Ralston 42'	(Report)		Stadium: Gillette Stadium; Attendance: 15,627; Referee: Peter Prendergast (Jamaica)

July 23 Gold Cup Semifinal	United States	1 – 2 (a.e.t.)	Brazil	Miami
20:00 UTC−04	Bocanegra 62'	(Report)	Kaká 89'; Diego 100' (pen.)	Stadium: Orange Bowl; Attendance: 35,211; Referee: Carlos Batres (Guatemala)

July 26 Gold Cup 3rd Place Match	United States	3 – 2	Costa Rica	Miami
20:00 UTC−04	Bocanegra 29'; Stewart 56'; Convey 67'	(Report)	Fonseca 24', 39'	Stadium: Orange Bowl; Attendance: 5,093; Referee: Richard Piper (Trinidad & Tobago)

== Major League Soccer ==
=== Standings ===
Eastern Conference	GP	W	L	D	GF	GA	GD	Pts
s – Chicago Fire	30	15	7	8	53	43	10	53
x – New England Revolution	30	12	9	9	55	47	8	45
x – MetroStars	30	11	10	9	40	40	0	42
x – D.C. United	30	10	11	9	38	36	2	39
Columbus Crew	30	10	12	8	44	44	0	38

Western Conference	GP	W	L	D	GF	GA	GD	Pts
y – San Jose Earthquakes	30	14	7	9	45	35	10	51
x – Kansas City Wizards	30	11	10	9	48	44	4	42
x – Colorado Rapids	30	11	12	7	40	45	-5	40
x – Los Angeles Galaxy	30	9	12	9	35	35	0	36
Dallas Burn	30	6	19	5	35	64	-29	23

- Top eight teams with the highest points clinch play-off berth, regardless of conference.
  x = Playoff berth
  y = Conference Winner (Season)
  s = Supporters Shield/Conference winner (Season)

=== Playoffs ===
Conference Semifinals
Chicago Fire	2	2	4
D.C. United	0	0	0
Eastern Conference
New England Revolution	2	1	3
MetroStars	0	1	1
San Jose Earthquakes	0	5*	5
Los Angeles Galaxy	2	2	4
Western Conference
Kansas City Wizards	1	2	3
Colorado Rapids	1	0	1

Conference Finals
Chicago Fire	1
New England Revolution	0
San Jose Earthquakes	3
Kansas City Wizards	2

MLS Cup 2003
Chicago Fire	2
San Jose Earthquakes	4

=== MLS Cup ===
November 23

Chicago Fire	2 – 4	San Jose Earthquakes
Beasley 49'; Ronger 54' (o.g.)	(Report)	Ekelund 5'; Donovan 38', 71'; Mulrooney 50'

Home Depot Center, Carson, California
Attendance: 27,000
Referee: Brian Hall

== A-League ==
=== Standings ===
==== Eastern Conference ====
===== Northeast Division =====
Place	Team	P	W	L	T	GF	GA	Points
1	Montreal Impact	28	16	6	6	40	21	54
2	Rochester Raging Rhinos	28	15	7	6	40	21	51
3	Pittsburgh Riverhounds	28	15	9	4	50	41	49
4	Syracuse Salty Dogs	28	11	12	5	42	38	38
5	Toronto Lynx	28	11	13	4	29	38	37

===== Southeast Division =====
Place	Team	P	W	L	T	GF	GA	Points
1	Charleston Battery	28	15	6	7	41	27	54
2	Virginia Beach Mariners	28	14	9	5	51	34	47
3	Richmond Kickers	28	12	9	7	41	32	43
4	Charlotte Eagles	28	6	15	7	29	59	25
5	Atlanta Silverbacks	28	4	17	7	27	48	19

==== Western Conference ====
===== Central Division =====
Place	Team	P	W	L	T	GF	GA	Points
1	Milwaukee Wave United	28	18	10	0	61	32	54
2	Minnesota Thunder	28	17	9	2	44	28	53
3	El Paso Patriots	28	9	16	3	33	48	30
4	Cincinnati Riverhawks	28	9	19	0	38	62	24
5	Indiana Blast	28	3	23	2	28	67	11

===== Pacific Division =====
Place	Team	P	W	L	T	GF	GA	Points
1	Seattle Sounders	28	16	7	5	45	24	53
2	Vancouver Whitecaps	28	15	6	7	45	24	52
3	Portland Timbers	28	15	11	2	39	43	47
4	Calgary Storm	28	4	21	3	16	62	15

=== Playoffs ===
Quarterfinals
1	Montreal Impact	1	0	1
8	Rochester Raging Rhinos	2	0	2
4	Charleston Battery	0	4	4
5	Virginia Beach Mariners	1	1	2
2	Milwaukee Wave United	1	0	1
7	Minnesota Thunder	0	2	2
3	Seattle Sounders	0	1	1 (6-5 pk)
6	Vancouver Whitecaps	0	1	1

Semifinals
Rochester Raging Rhinos	0	0	0
Charleston Battery	1	0	1
Minnesota Thunder	1	1	2
Seattle Sounders	0	0	0

Final
Charleston Battery
Minnesota Thunder

== Lamar Hunt U.S. Open Cup ==
=== Bracket ===
Home teams listed on top of bracket

Third round
PDL	Mid Michigan	0
MLS	MetroStars	4
A-L	Rochester	4
PSL	New Hampshire	1
PSL	Wilmington	2
A-L	Atlanta	1
MLS	D.C. United	2
A-L	Pittsburgh	1
A-L	Virginia Beach	5
PDL	Carolina	0
A-L	Milwaukee	4
USASA	Bavarian SC	1
A-L	Minnesota	0
A-L	Seattle	1
A-L	El Paso	2
PDL	Fresno	5

Fourth round
MLS	Columbus	3
MLS	MetroStars	4
MLS	New England	2
A-L	Rochester	1
PSL	Wilmington	4
MLS	Dallas	1
MLS	D.C. United (ASDET)	1
A-L	Virginia Beach	0
A-L	Milwaukee	1
MLS	Chicago	4
MLS	Colorado	3
MLS	Kansas City	2
A-L	Seattle	1
MLS	San Jose	0
MLS	Los Angeles	3
PDL	Fresno	1

Quarterfinals
MLS	MetroStars (ASDET)	2
MLS	New England	1
PSL	Wilmington	0
MLS	D.C. United	1
MLS	Chicago	2
MLS	Colorado	1
A-L	Seattle	1
MLS	Los Angeles	5

Semifinals
MLS	MetroStars	3
MLS	D.C. United	2
MLS	Chicago	3
MLS	Los Angeles	2

Finals
MLS	MetroStars	0
MLS	Chicago	1

=== Final ===
October 15

Chicago Fire	1 – 0	MetroStars
Ralph 68'	(Report)

Giants Stadium, East Rutherford, New Jersey
Attendance: 5,183

== American clubs in international competitions ==
Club	Competition	Final round
Los Angeles Galaxy	2003 CONCACAF Champions' Cup	Quarterfinals
Columbus Crew	2003 CONCACAF Champions' Cup	Quarterfinals
New England Revolution	2003 CONCACAF Champions' Cup	First Round
San Jose Earthquakes	2003 CONCACAF Champions' Cup	First Round

=== Los Angeles Galaxy ===
March 16 Champions Cup First Round	C.D. Motagua (Honduras)	2 – 2	(United States) Los Angeles Galaxy	Tegucigalpa, Honduras
	Guevara 36', 85'		Ruiz 21' (o.g.); Lalas 61'	Stadium: Estadio Nacional

March 23 Champions Cup First Round	Los Angeles Galaxy (United States)	1 – 0	(Honduras) C.D. Motagua	Fullerton, California
	Lalas 72'			Stadium: Titan Stadium

April 9 Champions Cup Quarterfinal	Los Angeles Galaxy (United States)	1 – 4	(Mexico) Necaxa	Fullerton, California
	Chacón 36'		Franco 27', 51'; Zague 81'; Larrosa 87'	Stadium: Titan Stadium

April 16 Champions Cup Quarterfinal	Necaxa (Mexico)	2 – 1	(United States) Los Angeles Galaxy	Mexico City, Mexico
	Espinoza 43', 84'		Albright 32'	Stadium: Estadio Azteca

=== Columbus Crew ===
March 16 Champions Cup First Round	Árabe Unido (Panama)	2 – 1	(United States) Columbus Crew	Colón, Panama
	Salinas 7' (pen.); Medina 62'		Buddle 59'	Stadium: Estadio Armando Dely Valdés

March 23 Champions Cup First Round	Columbus Crew (United States)	3 – 0	(Panama) Árabe Unido	Columbus, Ohio
	Buddle 43', 59'; Martino 70'			Stadium: Columbus Crew Stadium

April 9 Champions Cup Quarterfinal	Monarcas Morelia (Mexico)	6 – 0	(United States) Columbus Crew	Morelia, Mexico
	Palacios 39'; Íñiguez 42', 70'; Bautista 49', 55'; Navia 68'			Stadium: Estadio Morelos

April 16 Champions Cup Quarterfinal	Columbus Crew (United States)	2 – 0	(Mexico) Monarcas Morelia	Columbus, Ohio
	Buddle 15'; Cunningham 29' (pen.)			Stadium: Columbus Crew Stadium

=== New England Revolution ===
March 23 Champions Cup First Round	Alajuelense (Costa Rica)	4 – 0	(United States) New England Revolution	Alajuela, Costa Rica
	Scott 17', 82' (pen.); Fonseca 32' (pen.); Alpízar 90+2'			Stadium: Estadio Alejandro Morera Soto

March 26 Champions Cup First Round	Alajuelense (Costa Rica)	1 – 3	(United States) New England Revolution	Alajuela, Costa Rica
	Fonseca 66'		Twellman 18' (pen.); Harris 54'; Ralston 56'	Stadium: Estadio Alejandro Morera Soto

=== San Jose Earthquakes ===
March 16 Champions Cup First Round	Municipal (Guatemala)	4 – 2	(United States) San Jose Earthquakes	Guatemala City, Guatemala
	Romero 28', 37'; Figueroa 39'; Ponciano 55' (pen.)		Lagos 64', 71'	Stadium: Estadio Mateo Flores

March 26 Champions Cup First Round	San Jose Earthquakes (United States)	2 – 1	(Guatemala) Municipal	San Jose, California
	Donovan 19'; Ching 35'		Plata 76'	Stadium: Spartan Stadium
