= 2003 CONCACAF Gold Cup =

7th edition of the CONCACAF Gold Cup

Copa de Oro de la Concacaf 2003 (in Spanish)
- 2003 CONCACAF Gold Cup official logo

Tournament details
- Host countries: Mexico; United States
- Dates: July 12–27
- Teams: 12 (from 2 confederations)
- Venues: 3 (in 3 host cities)

Final positions
- Champions: Mexico (4th title)
- Runners-up: Brazil
- Third place: United States
- Fourth place: Costa Rica

Tournament statistics
- Matches played: 20
- Goals scored: 50 (2.5 per match)
- Top scorer(s): (Costa Rica) Walter Centeno (United States) Landon Donovan (4 goals each)
- Best player: (Mexico) Jesús Arellano
- Best goalkeeper: (Mexico) Oswaldo Sánchez
- Fair play award: United States

The 2003 CONCACAF Gold Cup was the seventh edition of the Gold Cup, the soccer championship of North America, Central America and the Caribbean (CONCACAF).

For the first time since 1993, the tournament was held in more than one country, with games played in both United States and Mexico. The games were played in Mexico City, Miami, and for the first time in a northern U.S. city, Foxborough. The format of the tournament stayed the same as in 2002: twelve teams were split into four groups of three, the top two teams in each group would advance to the quarter-finals. Colombia and Brazil were invited, with the latter sending an Under-23 team.

The United States' Landon Donovan put four past Cuba in the quarterfinals in a 5–0 win, but the defending champions went out to Brazil in the semi-finals. The South Americans scored a goal in the 89th minute and added a penalty in extra time to win 2–1. Mexico won their first championship since 1998, beating Brazil 1–0 in extra time.

== Venues ==
Mexico	United States	
Mexico City	Miami	Foxborough
Estadio Azteca	Orange Bowl	Gillette Stadium
Capacity: 105,000	Capacity: 72,319	Capacity: 68,756
Location of the host cities of the 2003 CONCACAF Gold Cup.

== Teams ==
=== Qualification ===
Team	Qualification	Appearances	Last Appearance	Previous best performance	FIFA Ranking
North American zone
Mexico	Automatic	7th	2002	Champions (1993, 1996, 1998)	11
United States (TH)	Automatic	7th	2002	Champions (1991, 2002)	9
Canada	Automatic	6th	2002	Champions (2000)	78
Caribbean zone qualified through the CFU Qualifying Tournament
Jamaica	Group A Winners	5th	2000	Third place (1993)	48
Cuba	Group B Winners	3rd	2002	Group stage (1998, 2002)	63
Martinique	Qualifying round	3rd	2002	Quarterfinals (2002)	N/A
Central American zone qualified through the 2003 UNCAF Nations Cup
Costa Rica	Winners	6th	2002	Runners-up (2002)	18
Guatemala	Runners-up	6th	2002	Fourth Place (1996)	65
El Salvador	Third Place	4th	2002	Quarterfinals (2002)	85
Honduras	Qualifying round	6th	2000	Runners-up (1991)	42
Other
Brazil	Invitation	3rd	1998	Runners-up (1996)	1
Colombia	Invitation	2nd	2000	Runners-up (2000)	22

=== Squads ===
The 12 national teams involved in the tournament were required to register a squad of 18 players; only players in these squads were eligible to take part in the tournament.

== Group stage ==
=== Group A ===
Pos	Team	Pld	W	D	L	GF	GA	GD	Pts	Qualification
1	Mexico	2	1	1	0	1	0	+1	4	Advanced to knockout stage
2	Brazil	2	1	0	1	2	2	0	3	Advanced to knockout stage
3	Honduras	2	0	1	1	1	2	−1	1	

Source: CONCACAF
July 13, 2003
12:00

Mexico	1–0	Brazil
Borgetti 70'	Report

Estadio Azteca, Mexico City
Attendance: 59,000
Referee: Rodolfo Sibrián (El Salvador)

July 15, 2003
21:00

Brazil	2–1	Honduras
Maicon 16'; Diego 84'	Report	De León 90' (pen.)

Estadio Azteca, Mexico City
Attendance: 3,000
Referee: Mauricio Navarro (Canada)

July 17, 2003
21:00

Honduras	0–0	Mexico
	Report

Estadio Azteca, Mexico City
Attendance: 8,000
Referee: Alfaro Nery (El Salvador)

=== Group B ===
Pos	Team	Pld	W	D	L	GF	GA	GD	Pts	Qualification
1	Colombia	2	1	1	0	2	1	+1	4	Advance to Knockout stage
2	Jamaica	2	1	0	1	2	1	+1	3	Advance to Knockout stage
3	Guatemala	2	0	1	1	1	3	−2	1	

July 13, 2003
15:00

Jamaica	0–1	Colombia
	Report	Patiño 42'

Orange Bowl, Miami
Attendance: 15,423
Referee: Kevin Stott (United States)

July 15, 2003
20:00

Guatemala	0–2	Jamaica
	Report	Lowe 30'; Williams 73' (pen.)

Orange Bowl, Miami, Florida, U S.
Attendance: 10,323
Referee: José Pineda (Honduras)

July 17, 2003

Colombia	1–1	Guatemala
Molina 79'	Report	Ruiz 21' (pen.)

Orange Bowl, Miami
Attendance: 11,233
Referee: Grevin Porras (Costa Rica)

=== Group C ===
Pos	Team	Pld	W	D	L	GF	GA	GD	Pts	Qualification
1	United States	2	2	0	0	4	0	+4	6	Advance to Knockout stage
2	El Salvador	2	1	0	1	1	2	−1	3	Advance to Knockout stage
3	Martinique	2	0	0	2	0	3	−3	0	

July 12, 2003

United States	2–0	El Salvador
Lewis 28'; McBride 76'	Report

Gillette Stadium, Foxboro
Attendance: 33,652
Referee: Felipe Ramos (Mexico)

July 14, 2003

Martinique	0–2	United States
	Report	McBride 39', 43'

Gillette Stadium, Foxboro
Attendance: 8,780
Referee: Roberto Moreno (Panama)

July 16, 2003

El Salvador	1–0	Martinique
González 76'	Report

Gillette Stadium, Foxboro
Attendance: 10,361
Referee: Carlos Batres (Guatemala)

=== Group D ===
Pos	Team	Pld	W	D	L	GF	GA	GD	Pts	Qualification
1	Costa Rica	2	1	0	1	3	1	+2	3	Advance to Knockout stage
2	Cuba	2	1	0	1	2	3	−1	3	Advance to Knockout stage
3	Canada	2	1	0	1	1	2	−1	3	

July 12, 2003
13:00

Canada	1–0	Costa Rica
Stalteri 59'	Report

Gillette Stadium, Foxboro
Attendance: 33,652
Referee: Richard Piper (Trinidad and Tobago)

July 14, 2003

Cuba	2–0	Canada
Moré 15', 46'	Report

Gillette Stadium, Foxboro
Attendance: 8,780
Referee: Peter Prendergast (Jamaica)

July 16, 2003

Costa Rica	3–0	Cuba
Centeno 45'; Bryce 72'; Scott 77'	Report

Gillette Stadium, Foxboro
Attendance: 10,361
Referee: Felipe Ramos (Mexico)

== Knockout stage ==
=== Bracket ===
Quarter-finals
19 July – Foxborough
United States	5
Cuba	0
19 July – Miami
Colombia	0
Brazil	2
20 July – Mexico City
Mexico	5
Jamaica	0
19 July – Foxborough
Costa Rica	5
El Salvador	2

Semi-finals
23 July – Miami
United States	1
Brazil (a.s.d.e.t.)	2
24 July – Mexico City
Mexico	2
Costa Rica	0

Final
27 July – Mexico City
Brazil	0
Mexico (a.s.d.e.t.)	1
Third place play-off
26 July – Miami
United States	3
Costa Rica	2

=== Quarter-finals ===
July 19, 2003

United States	5–0	Cuba
Donovan 22', 25', 55', 76'; Ralston 42'	Report

Gillette Stadium, Foxboro
Attendance: 15,627
Referee: Peter Prendergast (Jamaica)
July 19, 2003

Costa Rica	5–2	El Salvador
Scott 11'; Centeno 45+2', 68' (pen.), 90+3' (pen.); Bryce 72'	Report	Murgas 34' (pen.); Pacheco 54'

Gillette Stadium, Foxboro
Attendance: 15,627
Referee: Felipe Ramos (Mexico)
July 19, 2003

Colombia	0–2	Brazil
	Report	Kaká 42', 66'

Orange Bowl, Miami
Attendance: 23,425
Referee: Ken Stott (United States)
July 20, 2003

Mexico	5–0	Jamaica
Bravo 38'; García 42'; Osorno 55'; Borgetti 61'; Rodríguez 83'	Report

Estadio Azteca, Mexico City
Attendance: 10,000
Referee: Mauricio Navarro (Canada)

=== Semi-finals ===
July 23, 2003

United States	1–2 (a.e.t./g.g.)	Brazil
Bocanegra 62'	Report	Kaká 89'; Diego 100' (pen.)

Orange Bowl, Miami
Attendance: 35,211
Referee: Carlos Alberto Batres (Guatemala)
July 24, 2003

Mexico	2–0	Costa Rica
Márquez 19'; Borgetti 28'	Report

Estadio Azteca, Mexico City
Attendance: 35,000
Referee: Alfaro Nery (El Salvador)

=== Third place play-off ===
July 26, 2003

United States	3–2	Costa Rica
Bocanegra 29'; Stewart 56'; Convey 67'	Report	Fonseca 24', 39'

Orange Bowl, Miami
Attendance: 5,093
Referee: Richard Piper (Trinidad and Tobago)

=== Final ===
27 July 2003

Mexico	1–0 (a.e.t./g.g.)	Brazil
Osorno 97'	Report

Estadio Azteca, Mexico City
Attendance: 65,428
Referee: Mauricio Navarro (Canada)

== Statistics ==
=== Goalscorers ===
There were 50 goals scored in 20 matches, for an average of 2.5 goals per match.

4 goals

- (Costa Rica) Walter Centeno
- (United States) Landon Donovan

3 goals

- (Brazil) Kaká
- (Mexico) Jared Borgetti
- (United States) Brian McBride

2 goals

- (Brazil) Diego
- (Costa Rica) Steven Bryce
- (Costa Rica) Rolando Fonseca
- (Costa Rica) Erick Scott
- (Cuba) Lester Moré
- (Mexico) Daniel Osorno
- (United States) Carlos Bocanegra

1 goal

- (Brazil) Maicon
- (Canada) Paul Stalteri
- (Colombia) Mauricio Molina
- (Colombia) Jairo Patiño
- (El Salvador) Marvin González
- (El Salvador) Gilberto Murgas
- (El Salvador) Alfredo Pacheco
- (Guatemala) Carlos Ruiz
- (Honduras) Julio César de León
- (Jamaica) Onandi Lowe
- (Jamaica) Andy Williams
- (Mexico) Omar Bravo
- (Mexico) Rafael García
- (Mexico) Rafael Márquez
- (Mexico) Juan Pablo Rodríguez
- (United States) Bobby Convey
- (United States) Eddie Lewis
- (United States) Steve Ralston
- (United States) Earnie Stewart

== Awards ==
The following Gold Cup awards were given at the conclusion of the tournament: the Golden Boot (top scorer), Golden Ball (best overall player) and Golden Glove (best goalkeeper).

Golden Ball
(Mexico) Jesús Arellano
Golden Boot
(Costa Rica) Walter Centeno
(United States) Landon Donovan
4 goals
Golden Glove
(Mexico) Oswaldo Sánchez
Fair Play Trophy
United States

=== Team of the Tournament ===
The following players were selected for the 2003 CONCACAF Gold Cup Best XI.

Goalkeeper	Defenders	Midfielders	Forward
(Mexico) Oswaldo Sánchez	(Brazil) Maicon (Costa Rica) Carlos Castro (Mexico) Ricardo Osorio (Costa Rica) Mauricio Wright	(Costa Rica) Walter Centeno (Mexico) Rafael García (Colombia) Giovanni Hernández	(Mexico) Jesús Arellano (United States) Landon Donovan (Brazil) Kaká
