= Chris Armas =

American soccer player and coach (born 1972)

- Armas in 2026

Personal information
- Full name: Christopher Michael Armas
- Date of birth: August 27, 1972 (age 54)
- Place of birth: New York City, United States
- Height: 5 ft 7 in (1.70 m)
- Position: Midfielder

Team information
- Current team: Kansas City Current (head coach)

Youth career
- New York Hota Bavarian
- Brooklyn Italians
- Frosinone
- South Shore

College career
Years	Team	Apps	(Gls)
1990–1993	Adelphi Panthers	73	(17)

Senior career*
Years	Team	Apps	(Gls)
1994–1995	Long Island Rough Riders		(8)
1996–1997	LA Galaxy	50	(4)
1998–2007	Chicago Fire	214	(8)
Total		264	(20)

International career
1993–1994	Puerto Rico	8	(0)
1998–2005	United States	66	(2)

Managerial career
- 2011–2014: Adelphi Panthers (women)
- 2018–2020: New York Red Bulls
- 2021: Toronto FC
- 2023: Leeds United (interim)
- 2023–2025: Colorado Rapids
- 2026–: Kansas City Current
Medal record
Representing United States
Winner	CONCACAF Gold Cup	2002
Winner	CONCACAF Gold Cup	2005
Men's Soccer
- * Club domestic league appearances and goals

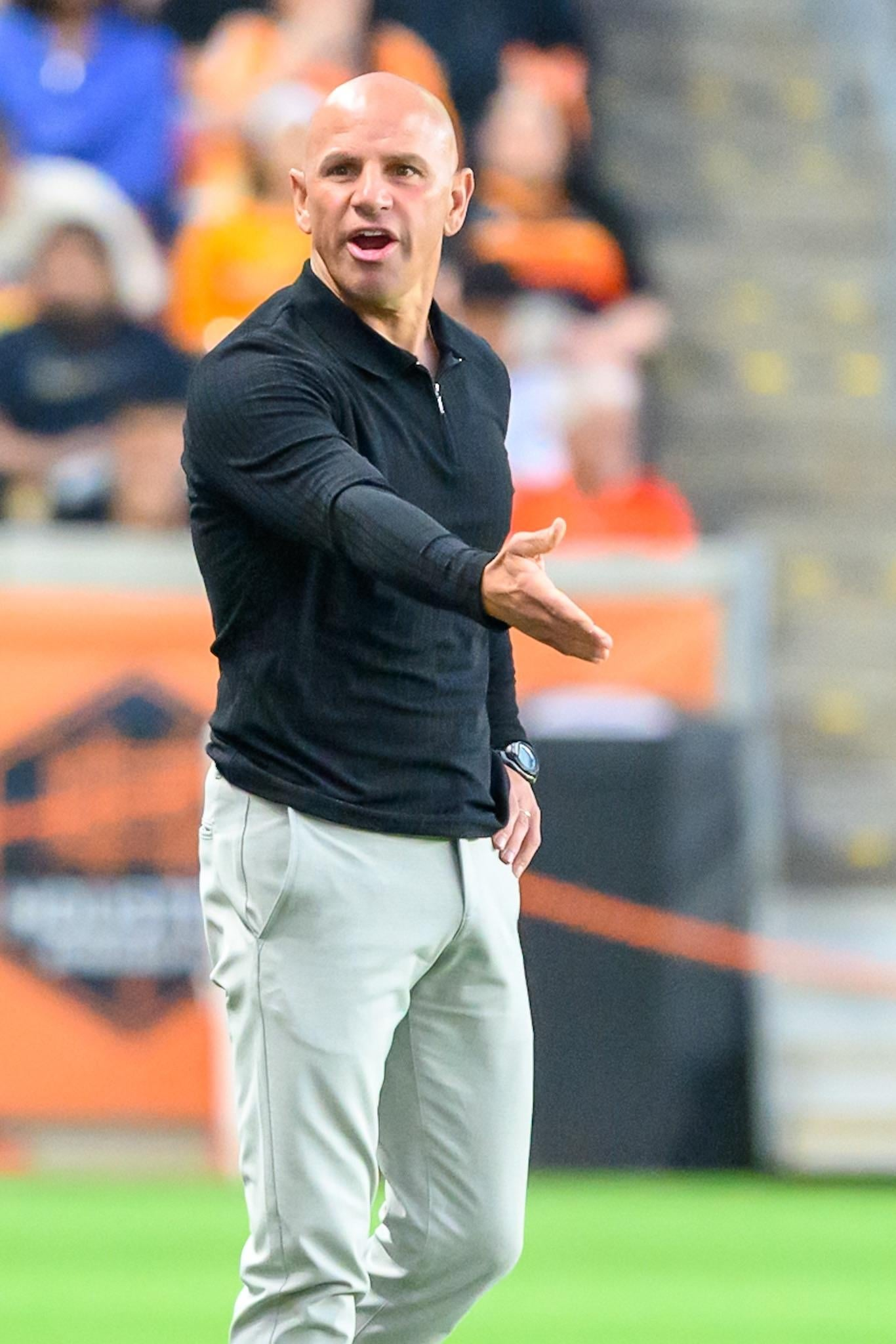
Armas with the Colorado Rapids in 2025

Christopher Michael Armas (born August 27, 1972) is an American professional soccer coach and former player who is the head coach of the Kansas City Current of the National Women's Soccer League (NWSL).

== Youth and college ==
Born in The Bronx, New York City, Armas is of Puerto Rican descent and grew up in Brentwood, New York. He graduated from St. Anthony's High School and then attended Adelphi University from 1990 to 1993, amassing 17 goals and 15 assists over his collegiate career. Armas was named an NCAA Division II First Team All-American his senior year.

== Playing career ==
=== Professional ===
After graduating from college, Armas spent 1994 and 1995 playing for the USISL's Long Island Rough Riders, being selected as a USISL All-Star. In 1995, the Rough Riders defeated the Minnesota Thunder in the USISL's Pro League Championship.

In 1996, Armas was drafted by Los Angeles Galaxy in the first round of the Major League Soccer Supplemental Draft and played a significant role in their first and second seasons. Chicago Fire acquired Armas in a trade for their inaugural 1998 campaign. It was with the 1998 Fire team that Armas emerged as an exceptional player, helping them win their first MLS Championship that year. Between 1998 and 2001, Armas was named to the MLS Best XI four consecutive times, his streak only being broken by an ACL injury that kept him out of much of the 2002 campaign; Armas was named to his fifth Best XI after the 2003 MLS season, in addition to being named the MLS Comeback Player of the Year. He was named U.S. Soccer Athlete of the Year in 2000. In ten years in MLS, he totaled eleven goals and 41 assists, plus added four goals and four assists in the playoffs.

On April 19, 2007, Armas announced that the 2007 MLS season with the Chicago Fire would be his last, as he decided to retire. His retirement was made official on November 13, 2007, after spending 12 years in MLS.

=== International ===
Armas played for Puerto Rico in the 1993 Caribbean Cup. The competition was not then recognized by FIFA and so his five matches were classed as friendlies.

He was therefore later allowed to switch his allegiance to the United States, for whom he made his debut November 6, 1998, against Australia. He went on to earn 66 caps. He did not break into the squad until soon after the 1998 FIFA World Cup, and his ACL injury came just before the 2002 FIFA World Cup, so he was never able to play for the United States in the World Cup. He was named as a standby player for the 2006 FIFA World Cup, and did not feature in the final squad.

== Coaching career ==
After his retirement, he coached youth soccer and was a high school physical education teacher at St. Anthony's High School.

Armas served as an assistant coach for the Chicago Fire in 2008 and was the head women's soccer coach at Adelphi University between 2011 and 2015.

On July 6, 2018, Armas was promoted to head coach of New York Red Bulls after former manager Jesse Marsch departed the club to join Red Bull Salzburg as an assistant. Armas helped the Red Bulls finish first in the regular season, winning the Supporters' Shield as a result. The Red Bulls were eliminated in the conference finals by Atlanta United.

In 2019, the Red Bulls finished sixth in the Eastern Conference and were eliminated by the Philadelphia Union in the first round of the playoffs. The Red Bulls were then eliminated in the group stage of the MLS is Back Tournament after they were defeated by FC Cincinnati. The team was in the middle of a scoring slump when Armas parted ways with the club on September 4, 2020, the day after a 1–0 loss to D.C. United.

In 2021, Armas was hired as head coach of Toronto FC, replacing Greg Vanney, who departed the club at the end of his contract. On July 4, 2021, following a 7–1 loss to D.C. United, the largest loss in the club's history and a league record of one win, eight losses and two draws, the team announced he had been fired.

On December 7, 2021, Armas was hired by Manchester United as assistant coach to work under interim manager Ralf Rangnick. He left the club in May 2022.

In January 2023, it was confirmed that Armas had re-united with Jesse Marsch at Leeds United. Armas was named co-interim head coach alongside Michael Skubala and Paco Gallardo following the sacking of Jesse Marsch in February, the trio overseeing a 2–2 draw at Old Trafford with Manchester United on 8 February 2023 and Skubala acting as solitary interim manager in the home loss against the same opponents four days later.

On November 17, 2023, Armas returned to Major League Soccer, signing as head coach of the Colorado Rapids.

On October 27, 2025, Armas and the Rapids mutually agreed to part ways after missing the MLS Cup Playoffs.

On January 7, 2026, Armas was named the head coach of the Kansas City Current of the National Women's Soccer League (NWSL).

== Personal life ==
Armas and his wife, Justine, have two sons, Christopher and Aleksei. Aleksi plays college soccer for Hofstra University.

== Career statistics ==
=== Club ===
Appearances and goals by club, season and competition
Club	Season	League			Playoffs		Cup (Note: All appearances in the U.S. Open Cup)		Continental		Total	
Club	Season	Division	Apps	Goals	Apps	Goals	Apps	Goals	Apps	Goals	Apps	Goals
LA Galaxy	1996	Major League Soccer	22	1	6	2	—		—		28	3
LA Galaxy	1997	Major League Soccer	28	3	2	0	—		2 (Note: Appearance(s) in the CONCACAF Champions' Cup)	0	32	3
LA Galaxy	Total		50	4	8	2	0	0	2	0	60	6
Chicago Fire	1998	Major League Soccer	31	1	5	0	3	0	—		39	1
Chicago Fire	1999	Major League Soccer	22	1	3	0	0	0	3	0	28	1
Chicago Fire	2000	Major League Soccer	16	0	5	0	4	0	—		25	0
Chicago Fire	2001	Major League Soccer	21	0	6	1	3	0	—		30	1
Chicago Fire	2002	Major League Soccer	4	0	0	0	0	0	2	0	6	0
Chicago Fire	2003	Major League Soccer	25	2	4	1	4	1	—		33	4
Chicago Fire	2004	Major League Soccer	21	1	—		3	0	3	1	27	2
Chicago Fire	2005	Major League Soccer	22	2	1	0	2	0	—		25	2
Chicago Fire	2006	Major League Soccer	27	1	2	0	2	0	—		31	1
Chicago Fire	2007	Major League Soccer	25	0	3	0	1	0	—		29	0
Chicago Fire	Total		214	8	29	2	22	1	8	1	273	12
Career total			264	12	37	4	22	1	10	1	333	18

=== International ===
Appearances and goals by national team and year
National team	Year	Apps	Goals
Puerto Rico	1993	6	0
Puerto Rico	1994	2	0
Puerto Rico	Total	8	0
United States
United States	1998	1	0
United States	1999	7	0
United States	2000	14	2
United States	2001	13	0
United States	2002	11	0
United States	2003	4	0
United States	2004	8	0
United States	2005	8	0
United States	Total	66	2

Scores and results list the United States' goal tally first, score column indicates score after each Armas goal.

List of international goals scored by Chris Armas
No.	Cap	Date	Venue	Opponent	Score	Result	Competition
1	9	January 16, 2000	Rose Bowl, Pasadena, California, United States	Iran	1–1	1–1	Friendly
2	13	February 19, 2000	Miami Orange Bowl, Miami, Florida, United States	Colombia	2–1	2–2 (1–2 pen.)	2000 CONCACAF Gold Cup

=== Coaching ===
As of 17 July 2026

Coaching record by team and tenure
Team	Nat.	From	To	Record					
Team	Nat.	From	To	G	W	D	L	Win %	Ref.
New York Red Bulls	(United States)	July 6, 2018	September 4, 2020	71	33	11	27	46.48	
Toronto FC	(Canada)	January 13, 2021	July 4, 2021	15	2	3	10	13.33	
Colorado Rapids	(United States)	November 17, 2023	October 27, 2025	82	30	17	35	36.59	
Kansas City Current	(United States)	January 7, 2026	Present	16	8	1	7	50.00	
Total				184	73	32	79	39.67	

== Honors ==
=== Player ===
Chicago Fire

- MLS Cup: 1998
- Supporters' Shield: 2003
- U.S. Open Cup: 1998, 2000, 2003, 2006

United States

- CONCACAF Gold Cup: 2002, 2005
- U.S. Soccer Athlete of the Year: 2000

Individual

- MLS Best XI: 1998, 1999, 2000, 2001, 2003
- MLS All-Star: 1998, 1999, 2000, 2001, 2003, 2004
- MLS Comeback Player of the Year: 2003
- Chicago Fire MVP: 2003
- National Soccer Hall of Fame: 2025

=== Coach ===
New York Red Bulls

- Supporters' Shield: 2018

Kansas City Current

- 2026 NWSL Championship
