= Daniel Osorno =

Mexican footballer (born 1979)

Personal information
- Full name: Daniel Osorno Calvillo
- Date of birth: 16 March 1979 (age 47)
- Place of birth: Guadalajara, Mexico
- Height: 5 ft 8 in (1.73 m)
- Positions: Striker; winger

Senior career*
Years	Team	Apps	(Gls)
1997–2007	Atlas	309	(61)
2003–2004	→ Monterrey (loan)	28	(2)
2007	Colorado Rapids	3	(0)
2008	Dorados	15	(0)
2009	Puebla	21	(3)
2009–2012	Atlas	35	(5)
2011–2012	Puebla	4	(0)
2012	→ Correcaminos (loan)	8	(0)
Total		394	(71)

International career
1999	Mexico U20	5	(2)
1999–2006	Mexico	57	(12)
Medal record
Men's football
Representing Mexico
FIFA Confederations Cup
Winner	1999 Mexico
CONCACAF Gold Cup
Winner	2003 United States–Mexico
Copa América
Runner-up	2001 Colombia
Third place	1999 Paraguay
- * Club domestic league appearances and goals

Daniel Osorno Calvillo (born 16 March 1979) is a Mexican former professional footballer who played as a striker and winger.

== Career ==
Osorno made his debut on 11 January 1997 in a game against Tecos UAG and quickly became one of the main goal scorers for Atlas. During this time, he was one of several players in the Atlas youth system to eventually join the Mexico national team, along with teammates such as Rafael Márquez, Juan Pablo Rodríguez, and Miguel Zepeda. Under the direction of head coach Ricardo Antonio Lavolpe, Atlas became a leading contender, with Osorno regularly starting on the left wing. In the Verano 1999 competition Atlas reached the final, but lost on penalties to Toluca. For seven years Daniel was a symbolic player for Atlas. However, his form began to deteriorate after dealing with some injury problems. Osorno was loaned out to Monterrey for a year in 2003. He made his return to Atlas in 2004, but did not manage to return to his old form.

After the conclusion of the 2006–2007 season, Osorno announced his departure from Club Atlas, with CF Monterrey and Santos Laguna showing interest in acquiring his services. On 1 August 2007 it was announced that Osorno had signed with the American team Colorado Rapids. He played only 3 games with the team.

Osorno returned to Mexico and was signed by Puebla F.C., where his career experienced a recovery.

== International career ==
Osorno was called up for the U-20 Mexico national team in 1999. Later that year, he made his debut with the Mexico national team, against Croatia on 16 June 1999. He has represented Mexico at several international competitions, including three Copa América tournaments: 1999, 2001, and 2004. Osorno was a member of the team that beat Brazil in the 1999 FIFA Confederations Cup, but saw no playing time in that tournament. He missed out on the 2002 FIFA World Cup, where he was one of the last players cut from the squad by coach Javier Aguirre.

Osorno also represented Mexico at the 2003 Gold Cup, where he scored the tournament-winning Golden Goal in the final match against Brazil. Osorno's final international appearance came against South Korea on February 15, 2006.

He also has a regional Mexican music band called Banda Pura Caña de Daniel Osorno.

=== International goals ===
#	Date	Venue	Opponent	Score	Result	Competition
1.	June 18, 1999	Seoul, South Korea	Egypt	2–0	Win	1999 Korea Cup
2.	June 18, 1999	Seoul, South Korea	Egypt	2–0	Win	1999 Korea Cup
3.	July 6, 1999	Ciudad del Este, Paraguay	Venezuela	3–1	Win	1999 Copa América
4.	June 4, 2000	Chicago, United States	Republic of Ireland	2–2	Draw	2000 Nike U.S. Cup
5.	April 11, 2001	Monterrey, Mexico	Chile	1–0	Win	Friendly
6.	July 22, 2001	Pereira, Colombia	Chile	2–0	Win	2001 Copa América
7.	July 6, 2003	Carson, United States	El Salvador	1–2	Loss	Friendly
8.	July 20, 2003	Mexico City, Mexico	Jamaica	5–0	Win	2003 CONCACAF Gold Cup
9.	July 27, 2003	Mexico City, Mexico	Brazil	1–0 (a.e.t.)	Win	2003 CONCACAF Gold Cup
10.	June 19, 2004	San Antonio, United States	Dominica	8–0	Win	2006 FIFA World Cup qualification
11.	November 10, 2004	San Antonio, United States	Guatemala	2–0	Win	Friendly
12.	November 17, 2004	Monterrey, Mexico	Saint Kitts and Nevis	8–0	Win	2006 FIFA World Cup qualification

== Honours ==
Mexico

- FIFA Confederations Cup: 1999
- CONCACAF Gold Cup: 2003
