= Manuel Torres (footballer, born 1978) =

Panamanian footballer (born 1978)

Personal information
- Full name: Manuel Vicente Torres Morales
- Date of birth: 25 November 1978 (age 47)
- Place of birth: Panama City, Panama
- Height: 1.73 m (5 ft 8 in)
- Position: Defensive midfielder

Team information
- Current team: Universitario
- Number: 26

Senior career*
Years	Team	Apps	(Gls)
1998–2003	Árabe Unido	135	(61)
2004–2012	San Francisco	176	(23)
2012–2015	Plaza Amador	98	(5)
2016	San Francisco		
2016–2019	Independiente		
2020	Universitario	7	(0)
2022–	Universitario	23	(0)

International career
2000–2009	Panama	35	(1)
- * Club domestic league appearances and goals as of 18:31, 12 November 2023 (UTC)

Manuel Vicente Torres Morales (born 25 November 1978) is a Panamanian footballer who plays as a midfielder for Liga Panameña de Fútbol club Universitario.

== Club career ==
Torres was born in Panama City, Panama. He started his career at hometown club Árabe Unido and also played for San Francisco. Nicknamed el Cholo, he joined Plaza Amador in 2012 after eight years with San Francisco.

== International career ==
Torres made his debut for Panama in a January 2000 friendly match against Guatemala, in which he immediately scored a goal, and has earned a total of 35 caps, scoring 1 goal. He represented his country in six FIFA World Cup qualification matches and played at the 2007 and 2009 CONCACAF Gold Cups.

His final international was a July 2009 CONCACAF Gold Cup match against the United States.

== Career statistics ==
Scores and results list Panama's goal tally first.

#	Date	Venue	Opponent	Score	Result	Competition
1	7 January 2000	Estadio Rommel Fernández, Panama City, Panama	Guatemala	2–0	4–1	Friendly match

== Honors ==
San Francisco

- ANAPROF: 2006, 2007 (A), 2008 (A)

Individual

- ANAPROF best midfielder: 2006
