= Ramesh Ramdhan =

Trinidad and Tobago football referee

- Full name: Ramesh Ramdhan
- Born: July 25, 1960 (age 66); Trinidad and Tobago

International
Years	League	Role
1993–2006	FIFA-listed	Referee

Ramesh Ramdhan (born July 25, 1960) is a football (soccer) referee from Trinidad and Tobago. He was the first referee from the Caribbean to officiate in the World Cup Finals (Japan-Croatia) during the 1998 FIFA World Cup held in France.

Ramdhan also officiated at numerous FIFA competitions, including the 1997 FIFA Confederations Cup, the 1995 and 2001 FIFA U-17 World Championships, and qualifying matches for the 1994, 1998, 2002, and 2006 World Cups. He also officiated at the 1993, 1996, 1998, and 2000 CONCACAF Gold Cups.

Assistant referee Caleb Wales, who was appointed to the 2022 FIFA World Cup in Qatar and the 2026 FIFA World Cup in North America, cited Ramdhan as his inspiration to become a referee himself. Wales stated that he watched the games that Ramdhan oversaw at the 1998 FIFA World Cup.
