= Eddie Lewis (American soccer) =

American soccer player

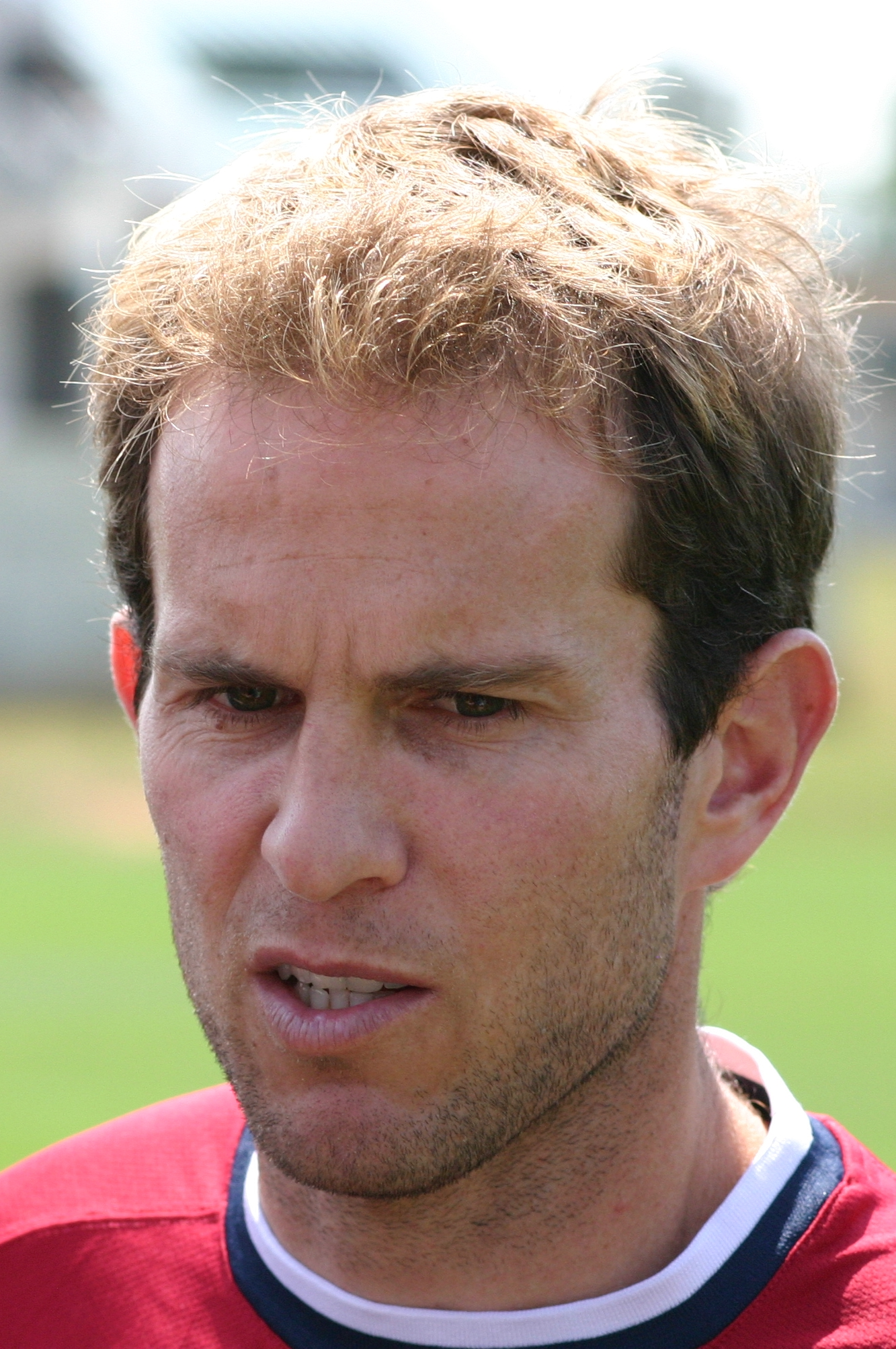
- Lewis in 2006

Personal information
- Full name: Edward James Lewis
- Date of birth: May 17, 1974 (age 52)
- Place of birth: Cerritos, California, U.S.
- Height: 5 ft 10 in (1.78 m)
- Position: Left winger

College career
Years	Team	Apps	(Gls)
1992–1995	UCLA		

Senior career*
Years	Team	Apps	(Gls)
1996–1999	San Jose Clash	115	(9)
2000–2002	Fulham	16	(0)
2002–2005	Preston North End	111	(15)
2005–2007	Leeds United	85	(8)
2007–2008	Derby County	24	(0)
2008–2010	Los Angeles Galaxy	48	(3)
Total		399	(35)

International career
1996–2008	United States	82	(10)
Medal record
Representing United States
Winner	CONCACAF Gold Cup	2002
Third place	CONCACAF Gold Cup	2003
Men's Soccer
- * Club domestic league appearances and goals

Edward James Lewis (born May 17, 1974) is an American former soccer player and entrepreneur.

During his 14-year professional career, Lewis played extensively in both the United States and England, for San Jose Clash, Fulham, Preston North End, Leeds United, Derby County and Los Angeles Galaxy. He was also a veteran member of the United States national team throughout the late 1990s and early 2000s; he acquired 82 caps, scored 10 goals and represented his country at the 1999 FIFA Confederations Cup, 2002 FIFA World Cup, 2003 FIFA Confederations Cup, 2003 CONCACAF Gold Cup and 2006 FIFA World Cup.

== Club career ==
=== Early career ===
Lewis attended Cerritos High School and was recruited to play college soccer at UCLA. He quickly rose to prominence on the team, earning the Rookie of the Year title his freshman year, and leading his team in scoring in 1995 as a junior. Lewis was then drafted by the then-San Jose Clash in the third round of the 1996 MLS College Draft. He would spend the next four years in San Jose, becoming a full-time starter in his second season. Originally a forward, the lefty moved to the midfield early on in his pro career. This would become Lewis' main position. In his time with the Clash, he scored nine goals and added 35 assists in 115 games and was named to the MLS Best XI in 1999.

=== Fulham ===
Lewis signed with England's Fulham, then in the Football League First Division, in March 2000. He spent three seasons there, but did not see much playing time. He made seven league appearances as the club was promoted to the Premier League in 2000/01 season. He only played one game for his club in 2001-02, the season finale against Blackburn Rovers. Overall, he appeared in 22 total games for the London club. His only goal for Fulham helped his side cause an upset when they knocked out one of his future employers, Derby County (then in the Premier League), in the League Cup.

=== Preston North End ===
Lewis made a move to Preston North End in 2002, Officially joining the club in September after a work permit denial led to a "protracted transfer." His transfer fee was undisclosed. Lewis spent the next three years with Preston, reaching the Division One playoff final in May 2005 which ended in defeat for Preston as they lost 1–0 to West Ham.

=== Leeds United ===
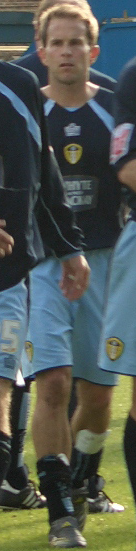
Lewis playing for Leeds United in 2005

In June 2005, Leeds United signed Lewis from Preston on a free transfer.

A set piece specialist, he scored memorable free-kicks against Burnley and against his former club, Preston North End. Lewis was the subject of a transfer bid from Wolverhampton Wanderers just before the transfer deadline in Summer 2006, but the bid was instantly rejected by chairman Ken Bates. Lewis was a regular in the 2006-07 Championship season with Leeds, once again playing left wing. In the first few matches of Dennis Wise's reign at the club, Lewis was played at left back, but after that he was put back to his favored left wing, but rotated between the positions as the season progressed. He scored three times for Leeds in the 2006–7 season.

In the May issue of Leeds magazine 'Leeds Leeds Leeds', Lewis suggested that he would be willing to stay at Elland Road even if Leeds United were to drop down to League One. At the end of the 2006–07 season Lewis was voted Leeds' fans Player of the Year being only the fourth non-British player in the club's history to receive the award. After Leeds were relegated Lewis signed a new one-year contract at Leeds and Lewis stayed at Leeds for the first few games in League 1, where he was given the number 3 shirt and was Leeds' regular left back. When Derby County came in for him Dennis Wise decided he could not stand in the way of his playing Premiership Football. Lewis left Leeds as a cult hero amongst the Elland Road fans.

=== Derby County ===
Derby County signed Lewis to a two-year deal for an undisclosed fee that saw Lewis rejoin his former manager at Preston Billy Davies. He scored an own goal against West Ham United in a Premiership match on November 10, 2007, at Pride Park. Before the start of the 2008–09 season and with Derby back in the second tier following a record low points haul in the Premier League, Lewis agreed to be released from his contract with Derby County to play in Major League Soccer.

=== Los Angeles Galaxy ===
Lewis rejoined Major League Soccer on August 21, 2008 and was reunited with recently hired Bruce Arena, under whom he served on the U.S. men's national team. After two and a half seasons with Los Angeles, Lewis announced he would retire at the end of the 2010 MLS season.

== International career ==
Lewis made his debut with the U.S. national team on October 16, 1996, against Peru, a game boycotted by almost all regular U.S. players because of salary concerns. Unlike most of the other players to appear in that game, Lewis went on to have a long national career, appearing in a total of 82 games. He played an important role for the U.S. in the 2002 FIFA World Cup, starting both elimination games and delivering a cross to Landon Donovan for the team's second goal in their 2–0 victory over Mexico.

With increasing competition at left midfield, most notably from DaMarcus Beasley, Lewis began a transition to left back in late 2005, debuting in that slot in a World Cup qualifier against Trinidad and Tobago on August 17, 2005. Although he continued to play left midfield for his professional club, Lewis welcomed the move to left back for the national team.

On May 2, 2006, for the second successive time, Lewis was named in the U.S. squad for the FIFA World Cup in Germany. Lewis started the American's first World Cup game against the Czech Republic at left back, but lost that spot after their disappointing 3–0 loss. After sitting out the U.S. draw with eventual champions Italy in their second game, he rejoined the starting lineup at left midfield against Ghana. His inspired play nearly helped the U.S. team to equalize, but his ball to Brian McBride glanced off the goal post. The United States were eliminated from the competition after suffering a 2–1 defeat. Lewis remained involved with the national team in the early rounds of qualification for the 2010 FIFA World Cup, with his final international goal coming in an away win over Barbados.

== International goals ==
#	Date	Venue	Opponent	Score	Result	Competition
1	Feb. 21, 1999	Ft. Lauderdale, Florida	Chile	2-1	2-1	Friendly match
2	Jan. 29, 2000	Coquimbo, Chile	Chile	1-0	2-1	Friendly match
3	March 10, 2002	Birmingham, Alabama	Ecuador	1-0	1-0	Friendly match
4	May 26, 2003	San Jose, California	Wales	2-0	2-0	Friendly match
5	July 12, 2003	Foxboro, Massachusetts	El Salvador	1-0	2-0	Friendly match
6	June 2, 2004	Foxboro, Massachusetts	Honduras	3-0	4-0	Friendly match
7	Feb. 9, 2005	Port-of-Spain, Trinidad	Trinidad and Tobago	2-0	2-1	2006 FIFA World Cup Qualifying
8	March 27, 2005	Mexico City, Mexico	Mexico	1-2	1-2	2006 FIFA World Cup Qualifying
9	March 26, 2008	Kraków, Poland	Poland	3-0	3-0	Friendly match
10	June 22, 2008	Bridgetown, Barbados	Barbados	1-0	1-0	2010 FIFA World Cup qualification

Lewis also scored an "eleventh" international goal on July 17, 1999; however, this goal does not count toward international statistics because it was scored against Derby County, an English Club Team that he would eventually play for.

== Business career ==
Lewis is the founder of soccer training technology company TOCA Football based in Orange County, California. Beginning as a small startup, the company is now internationally recognized, and has training centers across the United States. Lewis' experience in the soccer world has been integral to the success of TOCA.

== Honors ==
=== United States ===
- CONCACAF Gold Cup: 2002

=== Leeds United ===
- Player of the Season: 2006–2007

=== Los Angeles Galaxy ===
- Major League Soccer Supporter's Shield: 2010
- Major League Soccer Western Conference Championship: 2009

=== Individual ===
- MLS Best XI: 1999
- MLS All-Star: 1999
