= Felipe Ramos Rizo =

Mexican football referee

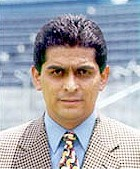
- Ramos Rizo in 2000
- Full name: Felipe de Jesús Ramos Rizo
- Born: 10 March 1963 (age 63); Mexico City, Mexico
- Other occupation: Sports commentator, sports writer

Domestic
Years	League	Role
1993–2003	Primera División	Referee

International
Years	League	Role
?	FIFA listed	Referee

Felipe de Jesús Ramos Rizo (born 10 March 1963 in Mexico City) is a Mexican FIFA football referee who officiated three matches at the 2002 FIFA World Cup. He is currently a referee analyst for ESPN Deportes and ESPN Mexico.

== Career ==
Ramos Rizo made his debut as a referee on May 2, 1983. Ramos Rizo officiated the 2000 Summer Olympics gold medal match between Cameroon and Spain. In 2001 FIFA assigned Ramos Rizo to officiate a 2002 World Cup qualifier between Iraq and Iran, which was held in Baghdad, Iraq.

Ramos Rizo was the fourth official in the 2002 FIFA World Cup opening match between France and Senegal which resulted in a win for Senegal. He also officiated a quarterfinal match between England and Brazil where he sent off Ronaldinho in the 57th minute.

In 2002, Ramos Rizo was involved in several scandals. He was accused of corruption after refereeing a match between Jaguares de Chiapas and Cruz Azul, which Chiapas won 1–0; the match was crucial for Chiapas aspirations, since the team was involved in relegation and a loss would have been critical. Because of this, Ramos Rizo privacy was violated after his phone line was intercepted. In one of the calls, Ramos Rizo attacked Edgardo Codesal, then Head of the Mexican Refereeing Commission, and was vetoed from refereeing in the league and was later barred by the Mexican Football Federation. These events forced Ramos Rizo into retirement, which officially happened in October 2003.

He currently does referee analysis on ESPN Deportes show Futbol Picante and is a writer for several sports publications and websites.

== Olympic Games matches officiated ==
Tournament	Date	Venue	Round	Team 1	Result	Team 2
(Australia) 2000	14 September 2000	Hindmarsh Stadium, Adelaide	Group stage	South Korea	0–3	Spain
(Australia) 2000	19 September 2000	Hindmarsh Stadium, Adelaide	Group stage	Italy	1–1	Nigeria
(Australia) 2000	30 September 2000	Olympic Stadium, Sydney	Final	Spain	2–2 (3–5 p)	Cameroon

== World Cup matches officiated ==
Tournament	Date	Venue	Round	Team 1	Result	Team 2
(South Korea) (Japan) 2002	6 June 2002	Asiad Main Stadium, Busan	Group stage	France	0–0	Uruguay
(South Korea) (Japan) 2002	12 June 2002	Jeju World Cup Stadium, Seogwipo	Group stage	Slovenia	1–3	Paraguay
(South Korea) (Japan) 2002	21 June 2002	Shizuoka Stadium, Shizuoka	Quarter-finals	England	1–2	Brazil

Sporting positions (Mexico) Felipe Ramos Rizo
Preceded by (Italy) Pierluigi Collina	2000 Men's Olympic Football Tournament Final Referee	Succeeded by (Greece) Kyros Vassaras
