= William Mattus =

Costa Rican football referee

William Mattus Vega
- Full name: William Mattus Vega
- Born: 17 April 1964 (age 62); Barva, Heredia, Costa Rica

Domestic
Years	League	Role

International
Years	League	Role
2002	FIFA listed	Referee

William Mattus Vega (born April 17, 1964, in Barva, Heredia) is a Costa Rican former football referee, best known for supervising two matches during the 2002 FIFA World Cup held in Japan and South Korea. As of 2022, Mattus was the last Costa Rican to officiate a match at a FIFA World Cup as a central referee until the designation of Juan Gabriel Calderón for the 2026 FIFA World Cup.
