= Benito Armando Archundia =

Mexican football referee

Benito Armando Archundia Téllez
- Full name: Benito Armando Archundia Téllez
- Born: 21 March 1966 (age 60); Mexico
- Other occupation: Lawyer, Economist

Domestic
Years	League	Role
1985–2011	Liga MX	Referee

International
Years	League	Role
1993–2010	FIFA listed	Referee

Benito Armando Archundia Téllez (born March 21, 1966) is a Mexican former football referee. He has been a professional referee since 1985 and has had his FIFA referee permission since 1993. His first fixture as an international referee was the 1994 match between USA and Greece.

Archundia is the all-time leader in appearances at the FIFA World Cup, being one of only two referees who have been appointed for 8 matches, the other being Joël Quiniou. He also shares the record for the most matches officiated in a single World Cup (5 in 2006). The only others who have achieved this feat are Horacio Elizondo in 2006, and Ravshan Irmatov in 2010.

In addition, he has supervised the final of the FIFA Club World Cup twice, in 2005 and 2009, also serving as fourth official in the 2005 FIFA World Youth Championship final in the Netherlands.

He originally planned to retire at the end of the 2010 FIFA World Cup, but decided to continue for at least another year. He was the referee in the grand opening of the Estadio Omnilife, which featured Guadalajara vs Manchester United.

In addition to working as a professional referee, Archundia is a lawyer and economist.

== World Cup ==
=== World Cup 2006 ===
Archundia made his first World Cup appearance in the 2006 FIFA World Cup and refereed a total of five matches, equaling the most matches by an individual referee (along with Argentina's Horacio Elizondo). His final game was the semi-final between Germany and Italy. In general he was one of the most respected and proficient referees at the 2006 World Cup, and give out an average of only 3 cards per game (the lowest of any referee at the competition).

Tournament	Date	Venue	Round	Team 1	Result	Team 2
2006	June 13	(Germany) Olympiastadion, Berlin	First round	Brazil	1 – 0	Croatia
2006	June 18	(Germany) Zentralstadion, Leipzig	First round	France	1 – 1	South Korea
2006	June 22	(Germany) FIFA WM Stadion Hamburg, Hamburg	First round	Czech Republic	0 – 2	Italy
2006	June 26	(Germany) FIFA WM Stadion Köln, Cologne	Round of 16	Switzerland	0 – 0 (0 – 3 pk)	Ukraine
2006	July 4	(Germany) FIFA WM Stadion Dortmund, Dortmund	Semi-finals	Germany	0 – 2 (a.e.t.)	Italy

=== World Cup 2010 ===
His second World Cup appearance was in the 2010 FIFA World Cup and refereed a total of three matches. His final game was the match for third place between Germany and Uruguay.

Tournament	Date	Venue	Round	Team 1	Result	Team 2
2010	June 14	(South Africa) Cape Town Stadium, Cape Town	First round	Italy	1 – 1	Paraguay
2010	June 25	(South Africa) Moses Mabhida Stadium, Durban	First round	Portugal	0 – 0	Brazil
2010	July 10	(South Africa) Nelson Mandela Bay Stadium, Port Elizabeth	Match for third place	Uruguay	2 – 3	Germany

== Controversy ==
On 27 June 2007, Archundia was the head referee of the semi-final match between Canada and the U.S.A.. During the last minutes of the match, Canada's Atiba Hutchinson scored a goal that would have equalised the score for Canada. However, a linesman erroneously indicated that Hutchinson was offside, and Archundia subsequently disallowed Hutchinson's goal. Video replays showed that the football came into contact with the U.S.A.'s defender Oguchi Onyewu immediately before Hutchinson scored the goal. Therefore, according to the laws of the game, there was no offside offence for Hutchinson.

== Notes ==
Preceded by (Netherlands) Dick Jol	FIFA Club World Cup final match referees 2005; Benito Archundia	Succeeded by (Guatemala) Carlos Batres
Preceded by (Uzbekistan) Ravshan Irmatov	FIFA Club World Cup final match referees 2009; Benito Archundia	Succeeded by (Japan) Yuichi Nishimura
