= Mauricio Navarro =

Chilean-born Canadian association football referee

Mauricio Navarro Espinoza
- Born: 7 April 1966 (age 60); Santiago, Chile

Domestic
Years	League	Role
? - 2008	Major League Soccer	Referee

International
Years	League	Role
2000 – 2011	FIFA listed	Referee

Mauricio Navarro Espinoza (born April 7, 1966) is a Canadian soccer referee. Navarro was born in Chile but later moved to Vancouver, British Columbia, Canada and became a Canadian citizen. He attained his FIFA badge in 2000 and went on to become one of Canada's most successful referees before retiring and the end of 2011, having reached the mandatory retirement age.

== Career ==
After just one year on the FIFA list, Navarro was appointed to the 2001 Copa America, hosted in Colombia. He officiated just one match, the Group C opener between Bolivia and Uruguay, which Bolivia won 1-0. Navarro later described this match as one of the most difficult of his career.

Navarro's next major appointment was to the 2003 Gold Cup, where he officiated three matches, one in the group stage, a Quarter-final, and then the Final.

=== 2003 Gold Cup Final ===
At his retirement, Navarro describes the 2003 Gold Cup final between Mexico, and reigning World Champions Brazil, as the pinnacle of his career. He had officiated both teams already in the tournament; Brazil in the Group Stage and Mexico in the Quarter-finals.

27 July 2003

Mexico	1–0 (a.s.d.e.t)	Brazil
Osorno 97'	Report

Estadio Azteca, Mexico City
Attendance: 80,000

In 2007, Navarro was appointed to the Gold Cup, where he refereed the Group Stage match between Panama and Honduras and the Quarter-Final match between Honduras and Guadeloupe. The same year he was selected to work the 2007 FIFA U-20 World Cup, which was hosted in Canada. Unfortunately, due to injury he did not referee any matches, instead only acting as a 4th Official.

=== 2008 CONCACAF Champions Cup Final ===
Navarro was selected, along with Canadian Assistant Referees Hector Vergara and Joe Fletcher to officiate the decisive second leg of the 2008 CONCACAF Champions Cup. For Navarro, this came after three successive semi-final appointments in the past three years of the tournament. This was the final match ever of the tournament, as beginning the following season it was replaced with the current CONCACAF Champions League.

30 April 2008

C.F. Pachuca (Mexico)	2 - 1	(Costa Rica) Deportivo Saprissa
Gimenez 3'; Rey 53'	Report	Arrieta 90+3'

Estadio Hidalgo
Pachuca, Mexico
Attendance: 30,000

=== Final international match ===
Navarro's final international appointment came on November 15, 2011 when he officiated the reigning World Champions Spain and Costa Rica. The initial plan was for Hector Vergara to work the match too, so the friends Navarro and Vergara could officiate their final match together, but Vergara had work commitments and was unable to accept the game.

15 November 2011
16:00 EST

(Costa Rica)	2 - 2	(Spain)
Brenes 31'; Campbell 42'	Report	Silva 83'; Villa 90'; Puyol (yellow card) 90'

Estadio Nacional de Costa Rica, San José
Attendance: 30,000

== International competitions officiated ==
- 2014 FIFA World Cup Qualification
- CONCACAF Champions League
- 2010 FIFA World Cup Qualification
- CONCACAF Champions Cup
- 2007 FIFA U-20 World Cup
- 2007 CONCACAF Gold Cup
- 2006 FIFA World Cup Qualification
- 2005 CONCACAF Gold Cup
- 2003 CONCACAF Gold Cup
- 2002 FIFA World Cup Qualification
- 2001 Copa America

== Honours ==
- Ray Morgan Memorial Award: 2002

== Personal life ==
Navarro was born in Chile. He later moved to Canada, and has two daughters.
