= Peter Prendergast (referee) =

Jamaican football referee (born 1963)

- Full name: Peter Prendergast
- Born: September 23, 1963 (age 63); Jamaica

International
Years	League	Role
1994–2006	FIFA-listed	Referee

Peter Prendergast (born September 23, 1963) is a Jamaican football referee. A FIFA referee since January 1, 1994, his first international match was USA against Ireland, on June 9, 1996. Since then he has refereed many matches in the CONCACAF Gold Cup, the Olympics, the FIFA World Cup and the Confederations Cup. Prendergast also refereed Costa Rica - United States (2-1) in the qualification stages for the same World Cup.

At the 2002 FIFA World Cup, Prendergast made the call during the Brazil vs Belgium round of 16 match to not acknowledge a goal made by Marc Wilmots.
