= Carlos Batres =

Guatemalan football referee

- Full name: Carlos Alberto Batres González
- Born: April 2, 1968 (age 58); Guatemala City
- Other occupation: Scientist, politician

Domestic
Years	League	Role

International
Years	League	Role
1996-2010	CONCACAF	Referee
2001-2010	FIFA	Referee

Carlos Alberto Batres González (born April 2, 1968) is a Guatemalan football referee. He has refereed FIFA World Cup qualification and final tournament matches, and at Olympic tournaments.

Having refereed in FIFA since January 1, 1996, Batres conducted his first international match on October 27, 1996, a 1998 World Cup qualifier between Panama and Canada.

He officiated at the 2002 FIFA World Cup, presiding over the Group A match between Denmark and Senegal and the second round match between Germany and Paraguay. He was also preselected as a referee for the 2010 FIFA World Cup.

On June 13, 2010, he refereed the match between Algeria and Slovenia, even though his mother had died barely four days before, on the night of June 9.

On June 20, 2010, he refereed the match between Italy and New Zealand, which ended in a 1–1 draw.

== World Cup matches officiated ==
Tournament	Date	Venue	Round	Team 1	Result	Team 2
2002	June 6, 2002	Daegu World Cup Stadium, Daegu	First round	Denmark	1 – 1	Senegal
2002	June 15, 2002	Jeju World Cup Stadium, Seogwipo	Round of 16	Germany	1 – 0	Paraguay
2010	June 13, 2010	Peter Mokaba Stadium, Polokwane	First round	Algeria	0 – 1	Slovenia
2010	June 20, 2010	Mbombela Stadium, Nelspruit	First round	Italy	1 – 1	New Zealand
2010	July 3, 2010	Ellis Park Stadium, Johannesburg	Quarterfinals	Paraguay	0 – 1	Spain

Preceded by (Mexico) Benito Archundia	FIFA Club World Cup final match referees 2006 (Guatemala) Carlos Batres	Succeeded by (Mexico) Marco Rodríguez
