= Honduras national football team results (2000–2009) =

Honduras
2000–09 season

This is a list of the Honduras national football team results from 2000 to 2009.

== 2000 ==
27 January 2000 Friendly	Honduras	1–1	Ecuador	San Pedro Sula, Honduras
19:30 CST	Martínez 88'		10' Graziani	Stadium: Estadio Olímpico Metropolitano; Attendance: 12,000; Referee: Evaristo Soriano (HON); Record: 0–3–1 (2:3)

9 February 2000 Friendly	Honduras	5–1	El Salvador	San Pedro Sula, Honduras
19:30 CST	Pavón 12'; Núñez 28' 75'; Hernández 69' (o.g.); Martínez 90'		81' Torres	Stadium: Estadio Francisco Morazán; Attendance: 11,000; Referee: Vivian Rodríguez (HON); Record: 20–12–14 (70:57)

14 February 2000 CGC	Honduras	2–0	Jamaica	Miami, United States
19:00 EST	Pavón 51' (pen.); Caballero 84'			Stadium: Miami Orange Bowl; Attendance: 50,164; Referee: Mario Sánchez (CHI); Record: 7–1–3 (30:13)

16 February 2000 CGC	Colombia	0–2	Honduras	Miami, United States
19:00 EST			71' Pavón; 78' Núñez	Stadium: Miami Orange Bowl; Attendance: 36,004; Referee: Ramesh Ramdhan (TRI); Record: 3–0–2 (7:4)

19 February 2000 CGC	Honduras	3–5	Peru	Miami, United States
17:30 EST	Clavasquín 32'; Pavón 67' (pen.); Pineda 69'	Match abandoned after 89' due to pitch invasion.	7' Holsen; 14' (pen.) Soto; 50' del Solar; 52' Palacios; 87' Sáenz	Stadium: Miami Orange Bowl; Attendance: 32,972; Referee: Mario Sánchez (CHI); Record: 2–2–1 (9:8)

4 March 2000 FWCQ	Honduras	3–0	Nicaragua	San Pedro Sula, Honduras
CST	Pineda 29'; Guerrero 41'; Núñez 71'			Stadium: Estadio Olímpico Metropolitano; Attendance: 18,000; Referee: Ramón Argueta (SLV); Record: 10–1–1 (37:6)

8 March 2000 Friendly	Ecuador	1–3	Honduras	Quito, Ecuador
ECT	Hurtado 24'		54' 63' Cárcamo; 90' Velásquez	Stadium: Estadio de Liga Deportiva Universitaria; Attendance: 1,000; Referee: Segundo Díaz (ECU); Record: 1–3–1 (5:4)

22 March 2000 Friendly	Chile	5–2	Honduras	Santiago, Chile
CLT	Tello 9'; Sierra 34'; Tapia 42'; Pizarro 80'; Núñez 87'		19' Martínez; 43' Chirinos	Stadium: Estadio Nacional Julio Martínez Prádanos; Attendance: 10,000; Referee: Ubaldo Aquino (PAR); Record: 0–0–1 (2:5)

2 April 2000 FWCQ	Panama	1–0	Honduras	Panama City, Panama
EST	Dely 70' (pen.)			Stadium: Estadio Rommel Fernández; Attendance: 20,000; Referee: Marvin Amores (CRC); Record: 18–2–4 (49:10)

16 April 2000 FWCQ	Nicaragua	0–1	Honduras	Diriamba, Nicaragua
CST			83' Ramírez	Stadium: Estadio Cacique Diriangén; Attendance: 6,000; Referee: Hugo Castillo (GUA); Record: 11–1–1 (38:6)

7 May 2000 FWCQ	Honduras	3–1	Panama	Tegucigalpa, Honduras
CST	Pavón 38' 66'; Núñez 70'		49' Dely	Stadium: Estadio Tiburcio Carías Andino; Attendance: 34,000; Referee: Mario Ramírez (GUA); Record: 19–2–4 (52:11)

19 May 2000 Friendly	Honduras	2–2	Romania	San Pedro Sula, Honduras
CST	García 9'; Cárcamo 36'		58' Turcu; 89' (pen.) Bălașa	Referee: Óscar Bardales (HON); Record: 0–3–0 (3:3)

30 May 2000 Friendly	Canada	2–1	Honduras	Winnipeg, Canada
CST	Peschisolido 27'; McKenna 81'		47' Cabrera	Stadium: Canad Inns Stadium; Referee: Timothy Weyland (USA); Record: 5–2–5 (19:18)

3 June 2000 FWCQ	Honduras	4–0	Haiti	San Pedro Sula, Honduras
CST	Núñez 31'; F. Pavón 40'; Pavón 77'; Caballero 87'			Stadium: Estadio Francisco Morazán; Attendance: 22,000; Referee: José Robles (MEX); Record: 7–0–3 (20:7)

17 June 2000 FWCQ	Haiti	1–3	Honduras	Port-au-Prince, Haiti
EST	Pierre 51'		7' Caballero; 50' Núñez; 87' de León	Stadium: Stade Sylvio Cator; Attendance: 4,000; Referee: Brian Hall (USA); Record: 8–0–3 (23:8)

16 July 2000 FWCQ	El Salvador	2–5	Honduras	San Salvador, El Salvador
CST	Montes 8'; Cienfuegos 89'		12' Caballero; 37' Turcios; 42' 62' Pavón; 88' Suazo	Stadium: Estadio Cuscatlán; Attendance: 36,000; Referee: Carlos Batres (GUA); Record: 21–12–14 (75:59)

23 July 2000 FWCQ	Jamaica	3–1	Honduras	Kingston, Jamaica
EST	Whitmore 27'; Lowe 69'; Burton 77'		2' Ramírez	Stadium: Independence Park; Attendance: 23,000; Referee: Timothy Weyland (USA); Record: 7–1–4 (31:16)

16 August 2000 FWCQ	Honduras	6–0	Saint Vincent and the Grenadines	Tegucigalpa, Honduras
CST	Pavón 5' 86'; Ramírez 19' 59'; Guevara 27'; Bengoché 88'			Stadium: Estadio Tiburcio Carías Andino; Attendance: 30,000; Referee: José Farías (CAN); Record: 5–0–0 (29:4)

20 August 2000 Friendly	Haiti	0–4	Honduras	New York City, United States
CST			Bengoché; Cruz; Scott	Referee: Record: 9–0–3 (27:8)

2 September 2000 FWCQ	Honduras	5–0	El Salvador	San Pedro Sula, Honduras
CST	Pavón 20' 43' 58'; Suazo 47'; Caballero 84'			Stadium: Estadio Olímpico Metropolitano; Attendance: 42,000; Referee: Fredy Burgos (GUA); Record: 22–12–14 (80:59)

8 October 2000 FWCQ	Honduras	1–0	Jamaica	Tegucigalpa, Honduras
CST	Turcios 90'			Stadium: Estadio Tiburcio Carías Andino; Attendance: 35,000; Referee: Ricardo Valenzuela (USA); Record: 8–1–4 (32:16)

14 November 2000 FWCQ	Saint Vincent and the Grenadines	0–7	Honduras	Kingstown, Saint Vincent and the Grenadines
AST			26' 31' Ramírez; 46' Velásquez; 52' C. Santamaría; 77' L. Santamaría; 85' Caballero; 89' Bengoché	Stadium: Arnos Vale Stadium; Attendance: 1,000; Referee: Noel Egan (ATG); Record: 6–0–0 (36:4)

== 2001 ==
In 2001 Honduras participated in its first Copa América by being a late invitee, replacing Argentina. Argentina withdrew from the competition after receiving death threats from Colombia, hosts of the tournament. With a limited squad, Honduras managed to finish third in the competition, eliminating Brazil in the quarterfinals. Sadly, 2001 also marks unfortunate events for the Honduran side; for the first time in their history Honduras failed to qualify to the CONCACAF Gold Cup by not advancing to the final stage in the 2009 UNCAF Nations Cup. They were also left on the verge of making it to their second FIFA World Cup by failing to beat Trinidad and Tobago at home in qualifiers, despite hitting the goal post 11 times and Trinidad and Tobago scoring in their only shot on goal.

Other achievements worth mentioning in 2001, it was the first time Honduras beat the United States in their home turf in a World Cup qualifier.

28 February 2001 FWCQ	Costa Rica	2–2	Honduras	San José, Costa Rica
20:00 CST	Fonseca 65'; Cordero 90+2'		3' Pineda; 85' Núñez	Stadium: Estadio Ricardo Saprissa Aymá; Attendance: 20,000; Referee: Ali Bujsaim (UAE); Record: 13–13–16 (54:82)

7 March 2001 Friendly	Honduras	0–0	Peru	Miami, United States
EST				Attendance: 17,790; Referee: Kevin Perry; Record: 2–3–1 (9:8)

21 March 2001 Friendly	Honduras	3–1	Chile	San Pedro Sula, Honduras
CST	Ramírez 10' (o.g.); Guevara 35'; García 71'		32' González	Stadium: Estadio Olímpico Metropolitano; Attendance: 30,000; Referee: Vivian Rodríguez (HON); Record: 1–0–1 (5:6)

28 March 2001 FWCQ	Honduras	1–2	United States	San Pedro Sula, Honduras
19:30 CST	de León 60'		33' Stewart; 87' Mathis	Stadium: Estadio Olímpico Metropolitano; Attendance: 45,000; Referee: Freddy Burgos (GUA); Record: 2–6–3 (11:10)

25 April 2001 FWCQ	Jamaica	1–1	Honduras	Kingston, Jamaica
EST	Gardner 56'		80' Caballero	Stadium: Independence Park; Attendance: 30,000; Referee: Carlos Simon (BRA); Record: 8–2–4 (33:17)

23 May 2001 UNC	Honduras	1–2	Panama	San Pedro Sula, Honduras
19:30 CST	Núñez 45'		35' Ju. Dely; 68' Jo. Dely	Stadium: Estadio Olímpico Metropolitano; Referee: Brian Hall (USA); Record: 19–2–5 (53:13)

25 May 2001 UNC	Honduras	10–2	Nicaragua	Tegucigalpa, Honduras
19:30 CST	Guerrero 22'; Pavón 24' 33' 82'; Rosales 38'; Solórzano 54' (o.g.); Núñez 72' 80'; Martínez 75' 76'		12' Webster; 86' Bermúdez	Stadium: Estadio Tiburcio Carías Andino; Attendance: 1,032; Referee: Germán Arredondo (MEX); Record: 12–1–1 (48:8)

27 May 2001 UNC	Honduras	1–1	El Salvador	San Pedro Sula, Honduras
17:30 CST	Turcios 41'		90' Umanzor	Stadium: Estadio Olímpico Metropolitano; Referee: Brian Hall (USA); Record: 22–13–14 (81:60)

16 June 2001 FWCQ	Trinidad and Tobago	2–4	Honduras	Port of Spain, Trinidad and Tobago
AST	Latapy 56'; John 90'		13' (pen.) Pavón; 20' Turcios; 54' Morales; 86' (pen.) Guevara	Stadium: Hasely Crawford Stadium; Attendance: 5,500; Referee: Mauricio Navarro (CAN); Record: 4–4–1 (13:10)

20 June 2001 FWCQ	Honduras	3–1	Mexico	San Pedro Sula, Honduras
CST	Pavón 16' 55' 64' (pen.)		86' Ruiz	Stadium: Estadio Olímpico Metropolitano; Attendance: 45,000; Referee: Horacio Elizondo (ARG); Record: 3–4–15 (20:48)

1 July 2001 FWCQ	Honduras	2–3	Costa Rica	Tegucigalpa, Honduras
CST	Guevara 25' 38'		9' Wanchope; 13' Fonseca; 83' Solís	Stadium: Estadio Tiburcio Carías Andino; Attendance: 38,000; Referee: Óscar Ruiz (COL); Record: 13–13–17 (56:85)

7 July 2001 Friendly	Ecuador	1–1	Honduras	Miami, United States
EST	Espinozo 90+2'		48' Martínez	Stadium: Miami Orange Bowl; Attendance: 22,370; Referee: Record: 1–4–1 (6:5)

13 July 2001 CA	Costa Rica	1–0	Honduras	Medellín, Colombia
20:15 COT	Wanchope 63'			Stadium: Atanasio Girardot Sports Complex; Attendance: 35,000; Referee: Mario Sánchez (CHI); Record: 13–13–18 (56:86)

16 July 2001 CA	Bolivia	0–2	Honduras	Medellín, Colombia
20:15 COT			53' 68' Guevara	Stadium: Atanasio Girardot Sports Complex; Attendance: 25,000; Referee: John Toro (COL); Record: 1–2–1 (3:3)

19 July 2001 CA	Honduras	1–0	Uruguay	Medellín, Colombia
20:15 COT	Guevara 86'			Stadium: Atanasio Girardot Sports Complex; Attendance: 35,000; Referee: Roger Zambrano (ECU); Record: 1–0–0 (1:0)

23 July 2001 CA	Brazil	0–2	Honduras	Manizales, Colombia
17:30 COT			57' 90+4' Martínez	Stadium: Estadio Palogrande; Attendance: 30,000; Referee: Ubaldo Aquino (PAR); Record: 1–1–2 (5:14)

26 July 2001 CA	Colombia	2–0	Honduras	Manizales, Colombia
19:45 COT	Bedoya 6'; Aristizábal 63'			Stadium: Estadio Palogrande; Attendance: 40,000; Referee: Mario Sánchez (CHI); Record: 3–0–3 (7:6)

28 July 2001 CA	Honduras	2–2 (5–4 p)	Uruguay	Bogotá, Colombia
19:45 COT	Martínez 14'; Izaguirre 42'		22' Bizera; 45' Martínez	Stadium: Estadio El Campín; Attendance: 47,000; Referee: Mario Sánchez (CHI); Record: 1–1–0 (3:2)
	Penalties
	Pineda (penalty scored); Martínez (penalty scored); García (penalty scored); Medina (penalty scored); Izaguirre (penalty scored)		(penalty scored) Sorondo; (penalty missed) Gutiérrez; (penalty scored) Rodríguez; (penalty scored) Lemos; (penalty scored) Olivera

1 September 2001 FWCQ	United States	2–3	Honduras	Washington, United States
EST	Stewart 7' 83'		27' 76' Núñez; 59' (pen.) Pavón	Stadium: Robert F. Kennedy Memorial Stadium; Attendance: 54,282; Referee: Mauricio Navarro (CAN); Record: 3–6–3 (14:12)

5 September 2001 FWCQ	Honduras	1–0	Jamaica	Tegucigalpa, Honduras
CST	Núñez 53'			Stadium: Estadio Tiburcio Carías Andino; Attendance: 22,000; Referee: Qasem Shaban (KUW); Record: 9–2–4 (34:17)

7 October 2001 FWCQ	Honduras	0–1	Trinidad and Tobago	San Pedro Sula, Honduras
CST			61' John	Stadium: Estadio Olímpico Metropolitano; Attendance: 45,000; Referee: Mike Seifert (CAN); Record: 4–4–2 (13:11)

11 November 2001 FWCQ	Mexico	3–0	Honduras	Mexico City, Mexico
CST	Blanco 65' 78'; Palencia 72'			Stadium: Estadio Azteca; Attendance: 105,405; Referee: Carlos Batres (GUA); Record: 3–4–16 (20:51)

== 2002 ==
12 February 2002 LNYC	Honduras	5–1	Slovenia	Hong Kong, China
HKT	S. Martínez 39' 58' 69' 72'; C. Martínez 90'		52' (pen.) Zahovič	Stadium: Hong Kong Stadium; Attendance: 26,244; Referee: Toru Kamikawa (JPN); Record: 1–0–0 (5:1)

15 February 2002 LNYC	Hong Kong League XI	0–1	Honduras	Hong Kong, China
HKT			67' Martínez	Stadium: Hong Kong Stadium; Attendance: 30,329; Referee: Toru Kamikawa (JPN); Record: 1–0–0 (1:0)

3 March 2002 Friendly	United States	4–0	Honduras	Seattle, United States
PST	Mathis 14' 59'; Donovan 44' 67'			Stadium: Safeco Field; Attendance: 38,534; Referee: Jerry Proctor (CAN); Record: 3–6–4 (14:16)

2 May 2002 KC	Japan	3–3	Honduras	Kobe, Japan
JST	Nakamura 26' 41'; Santos 76' (pen.)		15' Pineda; 27' 45' Pavón	Stadium: Kobe Universiade Memorial Stadium; Attendance: 38,130; Referee: Park Sang-Gu (KOR); Record: 0–1–0 (3:3)

20 November 2002 Friendly	Honduras	1–0	Colombia	San Pedro Sula, Honduras
CST	Núñez 76'			Stadium: Estadio Olímpico Metropolitano; Attendance: 25,000; Referee: Record: 4–0–3 (8:6)

== 2003 ==
11 January 2003 Friendly	Bayer 04 Leverkusen (Germany)	3–0	Honduras	Miami, United States
EST	Schneider 16' 38'; Bierofka 86'			Stadium: Miami Orange Bowl; Attendance: 31,312; Referee: Michael Kennedy (USA); Record: 0–0–1 (0:3)

31 January 2003 Friendly	Honduras	1–3	Argentina	San Pedro Sula, Honduras
CST	Martínez 7'		15' Milito; 53' L. González; 56' M. González	Stadium: Estadio Olímpico Metropolitano; Attendance: 20,000; Referee: Neftalí Recinos (SLV); Record: 0–0–1 (1:3)

11 February 2003 UNC	Honduras	2–0	Nicaragua	Panama City, Panama
EST	Martínez 4' de León 20'			Stadium: Estadio Rommel Fernández; Attendance: 500; Referee: Joel Aguilar (SLV); Record: 13–1–1 (50:8)

15 February 2003 UNC	El Salvador	1–0	Honduras	Colón, Panama
EST	Murgas 81'			Stadium: Estadio Armando Dely Valdés; Attendance: 600; Referee: Carlos Batres (GUA); Record: 22–13–15 (81:61)

18 February 2003 UNC	Panama	1–1	Honduras	Panama City, Panama
EST	Mendieta 61'		29' Martínez	Stadium: Estadio Rommel Fernández; Attendance: 5,000; Referee: Felipe Ramos (MEX); Record: 19–3–5 (54:14)

20 February 2003 UNC	Costa Rica	1–0	Honduras	Panama City, Panama
EST	Bryce 45+2'			Stadium: Estadio Rommel Fernández; Attendance: 200; Referee: Carlos Batres (GUA); Record: 13–13–19 (56:87)

23 February 2003 UNC	Guatemala	2–1	Honduras	Panama City, Panama
EST	Ramírez 7'; Figueroa 56'		75' Guevara	Stadium: Estadio Rommel Fernández; Attendance: 400; Referee: Felipe Ramos (MEX); Record: 12–15–11 (41:44)

2 April 2003 Friendly	Honduras	1–1	Paraguay	Tegucigalpa, Honduras
CST	Guevara 14' (pen.)		55' Quintana	Stadium: Estadio Tiburcio Carías Andino; Attendance: 25,000; Referee: Carlos Batres (GUA); Record: 0–2–1 (1:3)

25 April 2003 CGCQ	Trinidad and Tobago	0–2	Honduras	Fort-de-France, Martinique
AST			50' Velásquez; 89' Ramírez	Stadium: Stade d'Honneur de Dillon; Attendance: 750; Referee: Marco Rodríguez (MEX); Record: 5–4–2 (15:11)

27 April 2003 CGCQ	Martinique	2–4	Honduras	Fort-de-France, Martinique
AST	Goron 48'; Padoly 67'		31' Velásquez; 63' Ramírez; 73' Turcios; 89' Hernández	Stadium: Stade d'Honneur de Dillon; Attendance: 2,500; Referee: Marco Rodríguez (MEX); Record: 1–0–0 (4:2)

30 April 2003 Friendly	Colombia	0–0	Honduras	Miami, United States
EST				Stadium: Miami Orange Bowl; Attendance: 10,441; Referee: Michael Kennedy (USA); Record: 4–1–3 (8:6)

7 June 2003 Friendly	Honduras	1–2	Venezuela	Miami, United States
EST	Velásquez 45'		14' Urdaneta; 36' Arango	Stadium: Miami Orange Bowl; Attendance: 12,000; Referee: Record: 1–0–1 (2:2)

11 June 2003 Friendly	Honduras	1–2	Chile	San Pedro Sula, Honduras
CST	Pineda 13'		44' (pen.) Tapia; 60' González	Stadium: Estadio Olímpico Metropolitano; Attendance: 25,000; Referee: Hugo Castillo (GUA); Record: 1–0–2 (6:8)

22 June 2003 Friendly	Guatemala	1–2	Honduras	Carson, United States
PST	Acevedo 16'		51' Martínez; 55' Álvarez	Stadium: Home Depot Center; Attendance: 15,023; Referee: Record: 13–15–11 (43:45)

29 June 2003 Friendly	Honduras	1–1	El Salvador	San Pedro Sula, Honduras
CST	Velásquez 64'		80' Mejía	Stadium: Estadio Olímpico Metropolitano; Attendance: 5,000; Referee: Greivin Porras (CRC); Record: 22–14–15 (82:62)

15 July 2003 CGC	Brazil	2–1	Honduras	Mexico City, Mexico
CST	Maicon 16'; Diego 84'		90' (pen.) de León	Stadium: Estadio Azteca; Attendance: 3,000; Referee: Mauricio Navarro (CAN); Record: 1–1–3 (6:16)

17 July 2003 CGC	Mexico	0–0	Honduras	Mexico City, Mexico
CST				Stadium: Estadio Azteca; Attendance: 20,000; Referee: Alfaro Nery (SLV); Record: 3–5–16 (20:51)

11 October 2003 Friendly	Bolivia	1–0	Honduras	Washington, D.C., United States
EST	Peña 89'			Stadium: Robert F. Kennedy Memorial Stadium; Attendance: 20,000; Referee: Michael Kennedy (USA); Record: 1–2–2 (3:4)

16 November 2003 Friendly	Finland	2–1	Honduras	Houston, United States
CST	Tainio 60'; Hakanpää 68'		87' Álvarez	Stadium: Robertson Stadium; Attendance: 26,000; Referee: Brian Hall (USA); Record: 0–0–1 (1:2)

== 2004 ==
22 January 2004 LNYC	Hong Kong League XI	0–1	Honduras	Hong Kong, China
HKT			18' Cacho	Stadium: Hong Kong Stadium; Attendance: 16,765; Referee: Adunyachart Khantama (THA); Record: 2–0–0 (2:0)

25 January 2004 LNYC	Honduras	1–3	Norway	Hong Kong, China
HKT	Martínez 29'		26' Brattbakk; 37' Johnsen; 86' Hoseth	Stadium: Hong Kong Stadium; Attendance: 14,604; Referee: Fong Yau Fat (HKG); Record: 0–0–1 (1:3)

18 February 2004 Friendly	Honduras	1–1	Colombia	Tegucigalpa, Honduras
20:00 CST	de León 24'		58' Herrera	Stadium: Estadio Tiburcio Carías Andino; Referee: Record: 4–2–3 (9:7)

10 March 2004 Friendly	Venezuela	2–1	Honduras	Maracaibo, Venezuela
18:00 VET	Vera 36' (pen.); Noriega 52'		39' López	Stadium: Estadio José Pachencho Romero; Attendance: 15,000; Referee: Jorge Manzur (VEN); Record: 1–0–2 (3:4)

31 March 2004 Friendly	Jamaica	2–2	Honduras	Kingston, Jamaica
EST	Lowe 9'; Davis 52'		67' Martínez; 78' Núñez	Stadium: Independence Park; Referee: Record: 9–3–4 (36:19)

7 April 2004 Friendly	Honduras	0–0	Panama	La Ceiba, Honduras
CST				Stadium: Estadio Nilmo Edwards; Attendance: 10,000; Referee: Lucinio Rodríguez (HON); Record: 19–4–5 (54:14)

28 April 2004 Friendly	Ecuador	1–1	Honduras	Fort Lauderdale, United States
EST	Ordóñez 81'		31' Pavón	Stadium: Lockhart Stadium; Attendance: 22,370; Referee: Record: 1–5–1 (7:6)

2 June 2004 Friendly	United States	4–0	Honduras	Foxborough, United States
EST	McBride 23' 37'; Lewis 78'; Sanneh 82'			Stadium: Gillette Stadium; Attendance: 11,533; Referee: Rodolfo Sibrian (SLV); Record: 3–6–5 (14:20)

12 June 2004 FWCQ	Netherlands Antilles	1–2	Honduras	Willemstad, Netherlands Antilles
AST	Hosé 75'		9' 68' Suazo	Stadium: Ergilio Hato Stadium; Attendance: 12,000; Referee: Roy McArthur (GUY); Record: 4–3–3 (20:20)

19 June 2004 FWCQ	Honduras	4–0	Netherlands Antilles	San Pedro Sula, Honduras
CST	Guevara 7'; Suazo 22'; Álvarez 50'; Pavón 70'			Stadium: Estadio Olímpico Metropolitano; Attendance: 30,000; Referee: Gilberto Alcalá (MEX); Record: 5–3–3 (24:20)

28 July 2004 Friendly	Honduras	0–0	Panama	Tegucigalpa, Honduras
CST				Stadium: Estadio Tiburcio Carías Andino; Attendance: 6,000; Referee: Ricardo Zelaya (HON); Record: 19–5–5 (54:14)

31 July 2004 Friendly	Honduras	1–1	(Colombia) Once Caldas	Miami, United States
20:00 EST	Palacios 79'		26' Soto	Stadium: Miami Orange Bowl; Attendance: 7,432; Referee: Record: 0–1–0 (1:1)

3 August 2004 Friendly	El Salvador	0–4	Honduras	San Salvador, El Salvador
CST			5' Izaguirre; 6' 72' 76' Palacios	Stadium: Estadio Cuscatlán; Referee: Joel Chicas (SLV); Record: 23–14–15 (86:62)

18 August 2004 FWCQ	Costa Rica	2–5	Honduras	Alajuela, Costa Rica
CST	Herron 20' 36'		22' Suazo; 35' de León; 77' Guevara; 87' Guerrero; 89' Martínez	Stadium: Estadio Alejandro Morera Soto; Attendance: 14,000; Referee: Marco Rodríguez (MEX); Record: 14–13–19 (61:89)

4 September 2004 FWCQ	Canada	1–1	Honduras	Edmonton, Canada
MST	de Vos 82'		88' (pen.) Guevara	Stadium: Commonwealth Stadium; Attendance: 8,000; Referee: Benito Archundia (MEX); Record: 5–3–5 (20:19)

8 September 2004 FWCQ	Honduras	2–2	Guatemala	San Pedro Sula, Honduras
CST	Guevara 51'; Suazo 65'		20' Ruiz; 49' Pezzarossi	Stadium: Estadio Olímpico Metropolitano; Attendance: 40,000; Referee: Peter Prendergast (JAM); Record: 13–16–11 (45:47)

9 October 2004 FWCQ	Honduras	1–1	Canada	San Pedro Sula, Honduras
CST	Turcios 90+2'		73' Hutchinson	Stadium: Estadio Olímpico Metropolitano; Attendance: 42,000; Referee: Kevin Stott (USA); Record: 5–4–5 (21:20)

13 October 2004 FWCQ	Guatemala	1–0	Honduras	Guatemala City, Guatemala
CST	Ruiz 44'			Stadium: Estadio Mateo Flores; Attendance: 26,000; Referee: Neal Brizan (TRI); Record: 13–16–12 (45:48)

17 November 2004 FWCQ	Honduras	0–0	Costa Rica	San Pedro Sula, Honduras
CST				Stadium: Estadio Francisco Morazán; Attendance: 18,000; Referee: Carlos Batres (GUA); Record: 14–14–19 (61:89)

29 December 2004	Basque Country	2–0	Honduras	San Sebastián
20:30 CET	Yeste 20', 35'			Stadium: Anoeta; Referee: Eduardo Iturralde González

== 2005 ==
19 February 2005 UNC	Honduras	5–1	Nicaragua	Guatemala City, Guatemala
CST	Núñez 19' 84'; Velásquez 42' 51' 73'		54' Busto	Stadium: Estadio Mateo Flores; Attendance: 5,306; Referee: Roberto Moreno (PAN); Record: 14–1–1 (55:9)

21 February 2005 UNC	Belize	0–4	Honduras	Guatemala City, Guatemala
CST			7' Velásquez; 33' 80' Núñez; 88' Palacios	Stadium: Estadio Mateo Flores; Attendance: 3,000; Referee: Donald Campos (NCA); Record: 2–0–0 (9:1)

23 February 2005 UNC	Guatemala	1–1	Honduras	Guatemala City, Guatemala
CST	Romero 22'		72' Velásquez	Stadium: Estadio Mateo Flores; Attendance: 3,000; Referee: Roberto Moreno (PAN); Record: 13–17–12 (46:49)

25 February 2005 UNC	Honduras	1–0	Panama	Guatemala City, Guatemala
CST	Velásquez 72'			Stadium: Estadio Mateo Flores; Attendance: 11,159; Referee: Rodolfo Sibrián (SLV); Record: 20–5–5 (55:14)

27 February 2005 UNC	Costa Rica	1–1 (7–6 p)	Honduras	Guatemala City, Guatemala
CST	Wilson 68'		58' Núñez	Stadium: Estadio Mateo Flores; Attendance: 1,491; Referee: Carlos Batres (GUA); Record: 14–15–19 (62:90)
	Penalties
	Soto (penalty missed); Alfaro (penalty scored); Wilson (penalty scored); Cubero (penalty scored); Sequeira (penalty scored); Fonseca (penalty scored); Díaz (penalty scored); Umaña (penalty scored)		(penalty scored) Velásquez; (penalty scored) López; (penalty scored) Mendoza; (penalty missed) Berríos; (penalty scored) Núñez; (penalty scored) Guerrero; (penalty scored) Reyes; (penalty missed) Vallecillo

19 March 2005 Friendly	United States	1–0	Honduras	Albuquerque, United States
14:00 MST	Johnson 45'			Stadium: University Stadium; Attendance: 9,222; Referee: Mauricio Navarro (CAN); Record: 3–6–6 (14:21)

4 June 2005 Friendly	Honduras	0–0	Jamaica	Atlanta, United States
EST				Stadium: Herndon Stadium; Attendance: 6,500; Referee: Record: 9–4–4 (36:19)

2 July 2005 Friendly	Canada	1–2	Honduras	Burnaby, Canada
PST	McKenna 70'		52' Ramírez; 56' Velásquez	Stadium: Swangard Stadium; Attendance: 4,105; Referee: Ricardo Valenzuela (USA); Record: 6–4–5 (23:21)

6 July 2005 CGC	Honduras	1–1	Trinidad and Tobago	Miami, United States
EST	Figueroa 43'		28' Birchall	Stadium: Miami Orange Bowl; Attendance: 10,311; Referee: Mauricio Navarro (CAN); Record: 5–5–2 (16:12)

10 July 2005 CGC	Colombia	1–2	Honduras	Miami, United States
EST	Moreno 30' (pen.)		79' 82' Velásquez	Stadium: Miami Orange Bowl; Attendance: 17,292; Referee: Marco Rodríguez (MEX); Record: 5–2–3 (11:8)

12 July 2005 CGC	Honduras	1–0	Panama	Miami, United States
EST	Caballero 80'			Stadium: Miami Orange Bowl; Attendance: 8,457; Referee: Enrico Wijngaarde (SUR); Record: 21–5–5 (56:14)

16 July 2005 CGC	Costa Rica	2–3	Honduras	Foxborough, United States
13:00 EST	Bolaños 40'; Ruiz 81'		6' Velásquez; 27' Turcios; 30' Núñez	Stadium: Gillette Stadium; Attendance: 22,108; Referee: Benito Archundia (MEX); Record: 15–15–19 (65:92)

21 July 2005 CGC	United States	2–1	Honduras	East Rutherford, United States
18:00 EST	O'Brien 86'; Onyewu 90+2'		30' Guerrero	Stadium: Giants Stadium; Attendance: 41,721; Referee: Peter Prendergast (JAM); Record: 3–6–7 (15:23)

7 September 2005 Friendly	Japan	5–4	Honduras	Rifu, Japan
JST	Takahara 33'; Yanagisawa 48' 70'; Nakamura 55' (pen.); Ogasawara 78'		8' 27' 58' Velásquez; 45' Martínez	Stadium: Miyagi Stadium; Attendance: 45,198; Referee: Record: 0–1–1 (7:8)

== 2006 ==
25 January 2006 Friendly	Ecuador	1–0	Honduras	Guayaquil, Ecuador
ECT	Caicedo 67'			Stadium: Estadio Modelo Alberto Spencer Herrera; Attendance: 10,000; Referee: Pedro Ramos (ECU); Record: 1–5–2 (7:7)

12 February 2006 Friendly	China	0–1	Honduras	Guangzhou, China
CST			53' Oliva	Stadium: Tianhe Stadium; Attendance: 20,000; Referee: Ahmad Supian (MAS); Record: 1–0–0 (1:0)

16 August 2006 Friendly	Venezuela	0–0	Honduras	Maracay, Venezuela
VET				Stadium: Estadio Olímpico Hermanos Ghersi Páez; Attendance: 9,000; Referee: Record: 1–1–2 (3:4)

6 September 2006 Friendly	Honduras	2–0	El Salvador	Tegucigalpa, Honduras
CST	Bernárdez 32'; Palacios 81'			Stadium: Estadio Tiburcio Carías Andino; Attendance: 7,000; Referee: Record: 24–14–15 (88:62)

6 October 2006 Friendly	Guatemala	2–3	Honduras	Fort Lauderdale, United States
EST	Pezzarossi 26'; Ávila 31'		52' (pen.) Núñez; 69' de León; 87' (pen.) Suazo	Stadium: Lockhart Stadium; Attendance: 19,173; Referee: Terry Vaughn (USA); Record: 14–17–12 (49:51)

10 October 2006 Friendly	Guatemala	1–2	Honduras	Atlanta, United States
EST	Ruiz 69'		4' Figueroa; 49' Martínez	Stadium: Herndon Stadium; Attendance: 10,000; Referee: Alex Prus (USA); Record: 15–17–12 (51:52)

== 2007 ==
27 January 2007 Friendly	Honduras	1–1	Denmark	Tegucigalpa, Honduras
16:00 CST	Martínez 83'		79' Sørensen	Stadium: Estadio Tiburcio Carías Andino; Attendance: 2,047; Referee: Óscar Bardales (HON); Record: 1–1–1 (2:4)

9 February 2007 UNC	Costa Rica	3–1	Honduras	San Salvador, El Salvador
19:30 CST	Fonseca 4' 70'; González 46'		59' Martínez	Stadium: Estadio Cuscatlán; Referee: Benito Archundia (MEX); Record: 15–15–20 (66:95)

11 February 2007 UNC	Honduras	1–1	Panama	San Salvador, El Salvador
14:00 CST	Guardia 26' (o.g.)		79' Rivera	Stadium: Estadio Cuscatlán; Referee: Joel Aguilar (SLV); Record: 21–6–5 (57:15)

15 February 2007 UNC	Honduras	9–1	Nicaragua	San Salvador, El Salvador
19:30 CST	J. Martínez 4'; Velásquez 6' 27' 38' 39' (pen.); S. Martínez 69' 81' 86'; Mejía 78'		31' Wilson	Stadium: Estadio Cuscatlán; Attendance: 1,000; Referee: Joel Aguilar (SLV); Record: 15–1–1 (64:10)

24 March 2007 Friendly	El Salvador	0–2	Honduras	Fort Lauderdale, United States
EST			26' 66' Oliva	Stadium: Lockhart Stadium; Attendance: 17,095; Referee: Antonio Marrufo (MEX); Record: 25–14–15 (90:62)

27 March 2007 Friendly	El Salvador	0–2	Honduras	Cary, United States
EST			1' 57' Martínez	Stadium: SAS Soccer Park; Attendance: 8,365; Referee: Record: 26–14–15 (92:62)

19 April 2007 Friendly	Honduras	1–3	Haiti	La Ceiba, Honduras
CST	Pavón 6' (pen.)		40' Boucicaut; 70' Cadet; 77' Germain	Stadium: Estadio Nilmo Edwards; Attendance: 25,000; Referee: Evaristo Soriano (HON); Record: 9–0–4 (28:11)

25 May 2007 Friendly	Venezuela	2–1	Honduras	Mérida, Venezuela
VET	Vielma 18'; Arismendi 39'		45' Pavón	Stadium: Estadio Metropolitano de Mérida; Attendance: 42,000; Referee: Maiker Gómez (VEN); Record: 1–1–3 (4:6)

2 June 2007 Friendly	Honduras	3–1	Trinidad and Tobago	San Pedro Sula, Honduras
CST	Izaguirre 49'; Guevara 52' (pen.); Costly 85'		17' Thomas	Stadium: Estadio Francisco Morazán; Attendance: 12,000; Referee: Evaristo Soriano (HON); Record: 6–5–2 (19:13)

8 June 2007 CGC	Honduras	2–3	Panama	East Rutherford, United States
19:00 EST	Guevara 40'; Costly 90+2'		33' Rivera; 43' Pérez; 83' Garcés	Stadium: Giants Stadium; Attendance: 20,230; Referee: Mauricio Navarro (CAN); Record: 21–6–6 (59:18)

10 June 2007 CGC	Honduras	2–1	Mexico	East Rutherford, United States
16:00 EST	Costly 57' 90'		39' (pen.) Blanco	Stadium: Giants Stadium; Attendance: 68,123; Referee: Wálter Quesada (CRC); Record: 4–5–16 (22:52)

13 June 2007 CGC	Cuba	0–5	Honduras	Houston, United States
19:00 CST			3' 12' 42' 53' Pavón; 90' (pen.) Guevara	Stadium: Reliant Stadium; Attendance: 68,417; Referee: Joel Aguilar (SLV); Record: 5–2–5 (21:23)

17 June 2007 CGC	Guadeloupe	2–1	Honduras	Houston, United States
17:00 CST	Angloma 17'; Socrier 20'		70' Pavón	Stadium: Reliant Stadium; Attendance: 70,092; Referee: Mauricio Navarro (CAN); Record: 0–0–1 (1:2)

22 August 2007 Friendly	El Salvador	2–0	Honduras	San Salvador, El Salvador
CST	Anaya 28'; Merino 40'			Stadium: Estadio Cuscatlán; Referee: Elmer Bonilla (SLV); Record: 26–14–16 (92:64)

9 September 2007 Friendly; CCD	Costa Rica	0–0 (3–2 p)	Honduras	East Hartford, United States
EST				Stadium: Rentschler Field; Attendance: 8,000; Referee: Terry Vaughn (USA); Record: 15–16–20 (66:95)
	Penalties
	Centeno (penalty scored); Fonseca (penalty scored); Cordero (penalty missed); Núñez (penalty scored)		(penalty missed) Suazo; (penalty scored) Bernárdez; (penalty scored) Martínez; (penalty missed) Guevara; (penalty missed) Costly

12 September 2007 Friendly	Honduras	2–1	Ecuador	San Pedro Sula, Honduras
CST	de León 77'; Suazo 83'		89' (pen.) Guagua	Stadium: Estadio Olímpico Metropolitano; Attendance: 25,000; Referee: Carlos Batres (GUA); Record: 2–5–2 (9:8)

14 October 2007 Friendly	Honduras	1–0	Panama	Tegucigalpa, Honduras
CST	Martínez 54'			Stadium: Estadio Tiburcio Carías Andino; Attendance: 23,139; Referee: Ricardo Zelaya (HON); Record: 22–6–6 (60:18)

17 November 2007 Friendly	Guatemala	0–1	Honduras	Miami Gardens, United States
EST			20' Martínez	Stadium: Dolphin Stadium; Attendance: 20,885; Referee: Kevin Stott (USA); Record: 16–17–12 (52:52)

== 2008 ==
6 February 2008 Friendly	Honduras	2–0	Paraguay	San Pedro Sula, Honduras
19:30 CST	Guevara 47' (pen.); Costly 54'			Stadium: Estadio Olímpico Metropolitano; Attendance: 5,000; Referee: Edgar Rodríguez (CRC); Record: 1–2–1 (3:3)

26 March 2008 Friendly	Colombia	1–2	Honduras	Fort Lauderdale, United States
19:30 EST	Rentería 55'		31' Suazo; 63' Thomas	Stadium: Lockhart Stadium; Attendance: 18,886; Referee: Record: 6–2–3 (13:9)

23 May 2008 Friendly	Honduras	2–0	Belize	San Pedro Sula, Honduras
19:00 CST	Bernárdez 3' (pen.); Welcome 12'			Stadium: Estadio Olímpico Metropolitano; Referee: Erick Andino (HON); Record: 3–0–0 (11:1)

30 May 2008 Friendly	Honduras	1–1	Venezuela	Fort Lauderdale, United States
EST	Mendoza 2'		77' Maldonado	Stadium: Lockhart Stadium; Attendance: 15,000; Referee: Record: 1–2–3 (5:7)

4 June 2008 FWCQ	Honduras	4–0	Puerto Rico	San Pedro Sula, Honduras
20:30 CST	de León 25'; Palacios 51'; Suazo 52' 90+2'			Stadium: Estadio Olímpico Metropolitano; Attendance: 20,000; Referee: Courtney Campbell (JAM); Record: 1–0–0 (4:0)

7 June 2008 Friendly	Honduras	3–1	Haiti	La Ceiba, Honduras
19:00 CST	Martínez 21' (pen.); Suazo 67'; Guevara 73' (pen.)		77' Germain	Stadium: Estadio Nilmo Edwards; Attendance: 15,000; Referee: Ricardo Zelaya (HON); Record: 10–0–4 (31:12)

14 June 2008 FWCQ	Puerto Rico	2–2	Honduras	Bayamón, Puerto Rico
20:00 AST	Megaloudis 32'; Villegas 41'		23' Suazo; 52' Palacios	Stadium: Juan Ramón Loubriel Stadium; Attendance: 5,000; Referee: Walter López (GUA); Record: 1–1–0 (6:2)

20 August 2008 FWCQ	Mexico	2–1	Honduras	Mexico City, Mexico
20:00 CST	Pardo 73' 75'		36' de León	Stadium: Estadio Azteca; Attendance: 81,100; Referee: Joel Aguilar (SLV); Record: 4–5–17 (23:54)

6 September 2008 FWCQ	Canada	1–2	Honduras	Montreal, Canada
20:00 EST	Serioux 4'		47' 56' Núñez	Stadium: Saputo Stadium; Attendance: 13,032; Referee: Wálter Quesada (CRC); Record: 7–4–5 (25:22)

10 September 2008 FWCQ	Honduras	2–0	Jamaica	San Pedro Sula, Honduras
19:30 CST	Núñez 65'; Guevara 73' (pen.)			Stadium: Estadio Olímpico Metropolitano; Attendance: 39,000; Referee: Roberto Moreno (PAN); Record: 10–4–4 (38:19)

11 October 2008 FWCQ	Honduras	3–1	Canada	San Pedro Sula, Honduras
19:30 CST	Martínez 9'; Costly 65'; Thomas 90'		54' Hainault	Stadium: Estadio Olímpico Metropolitano; Attendance: 36,000; Referee: Jair Marrufo (USA); Record: 8–4–5 (28:23)

15 October 2008 FWCQ	Jamaica	1–0	Honduras	Kingston, Jamaica
19:00 EST	Shelton 16'			Stadium: Independence Park; Attendance: 25,000; Referee: Neal Brizan (TRI); Record: 10–4–5 (38:20)

19 November 2008 FWCQ	Honduras	1–0	Mexico	San Pedro Sula, Honduras
19:00 CST	Osorio 52' (o.g.)			Stadium: Estadio Olímpico Metropolitano; Attendance: 45,000; Referee: Carlos Batres (GUA); Record: 5–5–17 (24:54)

== 2009 ==
18 January 2009 Friendly	Chile	0–2	Honduras	Fort Lauderdale, United States
EST			77' Pavón; 84' (pen.) Guevara	Stadium: Lockhart Stadium; Attendance: 12,282; Referee: Shane Moody (USA); Record: 2–0–2 (8:8)

22 January 2009 UNC	Honduras	2–1	Belize	Tegucigalpa, Honduras
19:30 CST	Guevara 32'; Martínez 61'		86' Castillo	Stadium: Estadio Tiburcio Carías Andino; Attendance: 20,000; Referee: Roberto Moreno (PAN); Record: 4–0–0 (13:2)

24 January 2009 UNC	Honduras	4–1	Nicaragua	Tegucigalpa, Honduras
17:30 CST	Rodríguez 16'; Solórzano 65' (o.g.); S. Martínez 73'; W. Martínez 79'		30' Reyes	Stadium: Estadio Tiburcio Carías Andino; Attendance: 20,000; Referee: Carlos Batres (GUA); Record: 16–1–1 (68:11)

26 January 2009 UNC	Honduras	2–0	El Salvador	Tegucigalpa, Honduras
19:30 CST	Pavón 34' (pen.); Chávez 73'			Stadium: Estadio Tiburcio Carías Andino; Attendance: 20,000; Referee: Wálter Quesada (CRC); Record: 27–14–16 (94:64)

30 January 2009 UNC	Honduras	0–1	Panama	Tegucigalpa, Honduras
20:00 CST			40' Phillips	Stadium: Estadio Tiburcio Carías Andino; Attendance: 20,000; Referee: Carlos Batres (GUA); Record: 22–6–7 (60:19)

1 February 2009 UNC	Honduras	1–0	El Salvador	Tegucigalpa, Honduras
15:30 CST	Espinoza 30'			Stadium: Estadio Tiburcio Carías Andino; Attendance: 900; Referee: Wálter Quesada (CRC); Record: 28–14–16 (95:64)

11 February 2009 FWCQ	Costa Rica	2–0	Honduras	San José, Costa Rica
20:30 CST	Furtado 48' 59'			Stadium: Estadio Ricardo Saprissa Aymá; Attendance: 18,000; Referee: Joel Aguilar (SLV); Record: 15–16–21 (66:97)

28 March 2009 FWCQ	Trinidad and Tobago	1–1	Honduras	Port of Spain, Trinidad and Tobago
19:00 AST	Hyland 90'		51' Pavón	Stadium: Hasely Crawford Stadium; Attendance: 23,500; Referee: Wálter Quesada (CRC); Record: 6–6–2 (20:14)

1 April 2009 FWCQ	Honduras	3–1	Mexico	San Pedro Sula, Honduras
19:30 CST	Costly 17' 79'; Pavón 43'		82' (pen.) Castillo	Stadium: Estadio Olímpico Metropolitano; Attendance: 28,000; Referee: Paul Ward (CAN); Record: 6–5–17 (27:55)

6 June 2009 FWCQ	United States	2–1	Honduras	Chicago, United States
19:30 EST	Donovan 43' (pen.); Bocanegra 68'		5' Costly	Stadium: Soldier Field; Attendance: 55,647; Referee: Mauricio Morales (MEX); Record: 3–6–8 (16:25)

10 June 2009 FWCQ	Honduras	1–0	El Salvador	San Pedro Sula, Honduras
19:30 CST	Pavón 13'			Stadium: Estadio Olímpico Metropolitano; Attendance: 28,000; Referee: Baldomero Toledo (USA); Record: 29–14–16 (96:64)

28 June 2009 Friendly	Honduras	2–0	Panama	Cary, United States
17:00 EST	Lalín 20'; Norales 54'			Stadium: WakeMed Soccer Park; Referee: Record: 23–6–7 (62:19)

4 July 2009 CGC	Haiti	0–1	Honduras	Seattle, United States
16:00 MST			76' Costly	Stadium: Qwest Field; Attendance: 15,387; Referee: Marco Rodríguez (MEX); Record: 11–0–4 (32:12)

8 July 2009 CGC	United States	2–0	Honduras	Washington, D.C., United States
21:00 EST	Quaranta 74'; Ching 79'			Stadium: Robert F. Kennedy Memorial Stadium; Attendance: 26,079; Referee: Courtney Campbell (JAM); Record: 3–6–9 (16:27)

11 July 2009 CGC	Grenada	0–4	Honduras	Foxborough, United States
21:00 EST			2' Martínez; 25' Espinoza; 56' Valladares; 67' Costly	Stadium: Gillette Stadium; Attendance: 24,137; Referee: Marco Rodríguez (MEX); Record: 1–0–0 (4:0)

18 July 2009 CGC	Canada	0–1	Honduras	Philadelphia, United States
17:00 EST			36' (pen.) Martínez	Stadium: Lincoln Financial Field; Attendance: 32,000; Referee: Joel Aguilar (SLV); Record: 9–4–5 (29:23)

23 July 2009 CGC	United States	2–0	Honduras	Chicago, United States
19:00 CST	Goodson 45'; Cooper 90'			Stadium: Soldier Field; Attendance: 55,173; Referee: Courtney Campbell (JAM); Record: 3–6–10 (16:29)

12 August 2009 FWCQ	Honduras	4–0	Costa Rica	San Pedro Sula, Honduras
19:30 CST	Costly 30' 90+2'; Pavón 51'; Valladares 89'			Stadium: Estadio Olímpico Metropolitano; Attendance: 30,000; Referee: Marco Rodríguez (MEX); Record: 16–16–21 (70:97)

5 September 2009 FWCQ	Honduras	4–1	Trinidad and Tobago	San Pedro Sula, Honduras
19:00 CST	Pavón 20' 28'; Guevara 62'; Suazo 83'		86' Baptiste	Stadium: Estadio Olímpico Metropolitano; Attendance: 38,000; Referee: Mark Geiger (USA); Record: 7–6–2 (24:15)

9 September 2009 FWCQ	Mexico	1–0	Honduras	Mexico City, Mexico
20:00 CST	Blanco 76' (pen.)			Stadium: Estadio Azteca; Attendance: 97,897; Referee: Courtney Campbell (JAM); Record: 6–5–18 (27:56)

10 October 2009 FWCQ	Honduras	2–3	United States	San Pedro Sula, Honduras
20:00 CST	de León 47' 78'		50' 66' Casey; 71' Donovan	Stadium: Estadio Olímpico Metropolitano; Attendance: 37,000; Referee: Roberto Moreno (PAN); Record: 3–6–11 (18:32)

14 October 2009 FWCQ	El Salvador	0–1	Honduras	San Salvador, El Salvador
18:05 CST			64' Pavón	Stadium: Estadio Cuscatlán; Attendance: 28,000; Referee: Ricardo Salazar (USA); Record: 30–14–16 (97:64)

14 November 2009 Friendly	Honduras	2–1	Latvia	Tegucigalpa, Honduras
CST	Costly 41'; Welcome 86'		45' (pen.) Koļesņičenko	Stadium: Estadio Tiburcio Carías Andino; Attendance: 10,000; Referee: Wálter Quesada (CRC); Record: 1–0–0 (2:1)

18 November 2009 Friendly	Honduras	1–2	Peru	Miami Gardens, Florida, United States
EST	Suazo 47'		39' (o.g.) Izaguirre; 63' Rengifo	Stadium: Land Shark Stadium; Attendance: 11,917; Referee: Edwin Jurisevic (USA); Record: 2–3–2 (10:10)

== Record ==
Record does not include matches against clubs or representative teams of association football leagues.

Description	Record	Goals
2000s record	78–33–46	290:177
All-time record	198–115–138	730:563
