= Football at the 1994 Central American Games – Men's team squads =

== Group B ==
=== Honduras ===
Head coach: Luis Paz (BRA)

No.	Pos.	Player	Date of birth (age)	Caps	Club
	GK	Milton Flores	5 December 1974 (aged 19)		(Honduras) Real España
	GK	Héctor Medina	27 January 1975 (aged 18)		(Honduras) Olimpia
		Leroy Wood			(Honduras) Real Maya
	DF	César Clother	9 December 1973 (aged 20)		(Honduras) Real España
		José López			
		Arnaldo Guevara			
	DF	Behiker Bustillo	30 December 1973 (aged 20)		(Honduras) Marathón
		Geovany Morán			(Honduras) Marathón
		Bayron Suazo			
		Luis Perdomo			(Honduras) Real España
		Óscar Umanzor			
	MF	Edgar Sierra	23 June 1973 (aged 20)		(Honduras) Motagua
	MF	Gustavo Gallegos	1 June 1974 (aged 19)		(Honduras) Real España
	MF	José Pineda	19 March 1975 (aged 18)		(Honduras) Olimpia
		Néstor Peralta			(Honduras) Olimpia
	MF	José Romero	3 March 1973 (aged 20)		(Honduras) Motagua
		Edgar Figueroa			(Honduras) Real Maya
	FW	Carlos Pavón	9 October 1973 (aged 20)		(Honduras) Real España
	FW	Miguel Mariano	11 March 1974 (aged 19)		(Honduras) Platense
	FW	Milton Núñez	30 October 1972 (aged 21)		(Honduras) Deportes Progreseño
	FW	Wilmer Velásquez	28 April 1972 (aged 21)		(Honduras) Olimpia
