= Luis López (footballer, born 1951) =

Guatemalan footballer

Personal information
- Full name: Luis Rodolfo López Meneses
- Date of birth: 20 June 1951 (age 75)
- Place of birth: Guatemala
- Height: 1.74 m (5 ft 8 1/2 in)
- Position: Midfielder

Senior career*
Years	Team	Apps	(Gls)
- Juventud Retalteca

International career
1988	Guatemala	1	(0)

Managerial career
- Deportivo Ayutla
- * Club domestic league appearances and goals

Luis Rodolfo López Meneses (born 20 June 1951) is a Guatemalan former professional footballer who played as a midfielder.

== Club career ==
López played club football for Juventud Retalteca.

== International career ==
In 1988, López was selected in Guatemala's football squad for the 1988 Summer Olympics in South Korea. He made one appearance at the tournament, in a 4–0 defeat to Zambia on 21 September.

== Managerial career ==
In 2012, López became manager of Primera División de Ascenso side Deportivo Ayutla.
