= 2002 Lunar New Year Cup =

Tournament details
- Host country: Hong Kong
- Dates: 29 January – 1 February
- Teams: 4
- Venue: 1 (in 1 host city)

Final positions
- Champions: Honduras (1st title)

Tournament statistics
- Matches played: 4
- Goals scored: 9 (2.25 per match)
- Top scorer: (Honduras) Saul Martínez (5 goals)

The 2002 Lunar New Year Cup (also known as Carlsberg Cup) was a football tournament held in Hong Kong over the first and fourth day of the Chinese New Year holiday.

== Participating teams ==
- China
- Honduras
- Hong Kong League XI (host)
- Slovenia

== Squads ==
Some of the players include:

=== China ===
Coach: (Federal Republic of Yugoslavia) Bora Milutinović

No.	Pos.	Player	Date of birth (age)	Caps	Club
2	DF	(China) Gao Yao	13 July 1978 (aged 23)		(China) Shandong Luneng
4	DF	(China) Wu Chengying	21 April 1975 (aged 26)		(China) Shanghai Shenhua
5	MF	(China) Zhao Junzhe	19 April 1979 (aged 22)		(China) Liaoning Bird
6	MF	(China) Song Lihui	15 November 1974 (aged 27)		(China) Shandong Luneng
8	MF	(China) Li Tie	18 September 1977 (aged 24)		(China) Liaoning Bird
9	MF	(China) Ma Mingyu	10 August 1972 (aged 29)		(China) Sichuan Dahe
10	FW	(China) Yu Genwei	7 January 1974 (aged 28)		(China) Tianjin Teda
12	FW	(China) Su Maozhen	23 October 1971 (aged 30)		(China) Shandong Luneng
13	DF	(China) Chen Gang	9 March 1972 (aged 29)		(China) Qingdao Hademen
14	DF	(China) Li Weifeng	1 December 1978 (aged 23)		(China) Shenzhen Ping'an Insurance
15	MF	(China) Shen Si	1 May 1973 (aged 28)		(China) Shanghai COSCO Huili
16	FW	(China) Qu Bo	15 July 1981 (aged 20)		(China) Qingdao Hademen
17	DF	(China) Du Wei	9 February 1982 (aged 20)		(China) Shanghai Shenhua
18	MF	(China) Li Xiaopeng	20 June 1975 (aged 26)		(China) Shandong Luneng
19	MF	(China) Qi Hong	3 June 1976 (aged 25)		(China) Shanghai COSCO Huili
21	DF	(China) Xu Yunlong	17 February 1979 (aged 22)		(China) Beijing Guoan
22	GK	(China) Jiang Jin	7 October 1968 (aged 33)		(China) Tianjin Teda
23	GK	(China) Liu Yunfei	8 May 1979 (aged 22)		(China) Tianjin Teda
26	FW	(China) Zhang Yuning	25 May 1977 (aged 24)		(China) Liaoning Bird
27	MF	(China) Shao Jiayi	10 April 1980 (aged 21)		(China) Beijing Guoan
30	FW	(China) Li Yi	20 June 1979 (aged 22)		(China) Shenzhen Ping'an Insurance

=== Honduras ===
Coach: (Uruguay) Ernesto Luzardo

No.	Pos.	Player	Date of birth (age)	Caps	Club
1	GK	(Honduras) Victor Coello	29 July 1974 (aged 27)		(Honduras) Marathón
3		(Honduras) David Cárcamo			
4	DF	(Honduras) Samuel Caballero	24 December 1974 (aged 27)		(Italy) Udinese
5	DF	(Honduras) Sergio Mendoza	23 May 1981 (aged 20)		(Honduras) Real España
6	DF	(Honduras) Jaime Rosales	8 June 1978 (aged 23)		(Honduras) Marathón
7		(Honduras) Robel Bernandez			
8	MF	(Honduras) José Luis Pineda	19 March 1975 (aged 26)		
10	MF	(Honduras) Julio César de León	13 September 1979 (aged 22)		(Italy) Reggina
11	MF	(Honduras) Emil Martínez	17 September 1982 (aged 19)		(Honduras) Marathón
14		(Honduras) Ronny Morales			
16		(Honduras) Cristián Martínez			
18	FW	(Honduras) Saul Martínez	29 January 1976 (aged 26)		(Uruguay) Nacional
19	MF	(Honduras) Edgar Álvarez	9 January 1980 (aged 22)		(Honduras) Platense
20		(Honduras) Amado Alvarez			
21	DF	(Honduras) Limber Perez	26 July 1976 (aged 25)		

=== Hong Kong League XI ===
Coach: (Hong Kong) Wong Yiu Shun

No.	Pos.	Player	Date of birth (age)	Caps	Club
2	DF	(Hong Kong) Yau Kin Wai	4 January 1973 (aged 29)		(Hong Kong) South China
3	DF	(Brazil) Cristiano Cordeiro	14 August 1973 (aged 28)		(Hong Kong) South China
5	DF	(Brazil) André Hartwig			(Hong Kong) Sun Hei
7	FW	(Hong Kong) Au Wai Lun	14 August 1971 (aged 30)		(Hong Kong) South China
11	MF	(England) Gary McKeown	19 October 1970 (aged 31)		(Hong Kong) Sun Hei
17	FW	(Saint Kitts and Nevis) Keith Gumbs	11 September 1972 (aged 29)		(Hong Kong) Happy Valley
20	DF	(Hong Kong) Poon Yiu Cheuk	19 September 1977 (aged 24)		(Hong Kong) Happy Valley
26	GK	(Hong Kong) Fan Chun Yip	1 May 1976 (aged 25)		(Hong Kong) Happy Valley
	DF	(Hong Kong) Luk Koon Pong	1 August 1978 (aged 23)		(Hong Kong) South China
	MF	(Hong Kong) Lo Kai Wah	27 January 1971 (aged 31)		(Hong Kong) Happy Valley
	MF	(Cameroon) Gerard Ambassa Guy	21 September 1978 (aged 23)		(Hong Kong) Happy Valley
	MF	(Brazil) Aderbal Filho			(Hong Kong)
	FW	(Nigeria) Cornelius Udebuluzor	27 August 1974 (aged 27)		(Hong Kong) Buler Rangers
	FW	(Hong Kong) Cheng Siu Chung	29 September 1972 (aged 29)		(Hong Kong) South China

=== Slovenia ===
Coach: (Slovenia) Srečko Katanec

No.	Pos.	Player	Date of birth (age)	Caps	Club
1	GK	(Slovenia) Marko Simeunović	6 December 1967 (aged 34)		(Turkey) Etimesgut Şekerspor
2	DF	(Slovenia) Goran Sankovič	18 June 1979 (aged 22)		(Czech Republic) Slavia Prague
3	DF	(Slovenia) Željko Milinovič	12 October 1969 (aged 32)		(Japan) JEF United Ichihara
4	MF	(Slovenia) Amir Karić	31 December 1973 (aged 28)		(Slovenia) Maribor
5	DF	(Slovenia) Marinko Galič	22 April 1970 (aged 31)		(Slovenia) Koper
6	DF	(Slovenia) Bekim Kapič	2 January 1979 (aged 23)		(Slovenia) Koper
7	MF	(Slovenia) Džoni Novak	4 September 1969 (aged 32)		(Germany) SpVgg Unterhaching
8	MF	(Slovenia) Aleš Čeh	7 April 1968 (aged 33)		(Austria) Grazer AK
9	MF	(Slovenia) Nastja Čeh	26 January 1978 (aged 24)		(Belgium) Club Brugge
10	MF	(Slovenia) Zlatko Zahovič	1 February 1971 (aged 31)		(Portugal) Benfica
11	MF	(Slovenia) Miran Pavlin	8 October 1971 (aged 30)		(Portugal) Porto
12	GK	(Slovenia) Mladen Dabanovič	13 September 1971 (aged 30)		(Belgium) Lokeren
13	FW	(Slovenia) Mladen Rudonja	26 July 1971 (aged 30)		(England) Portsmouth
14	MF	(Slovenia) Saša Gajser	11 February 1974 (aged 28)		(Belgium) Gent
15	MF	(Slovenia) Rajko Tavčar	21 July 1974 (aged 27)		(Germany) 1. FC Nürnberg
16	FW	(Slovenia) Ermin Rakovič	7 September 1977 (aged 24)		(Israel) Hapoel Petah Tikva
17	MF	(Slovenia) Zoran Pavlovič	27 June 1976 (aged 25)		Austria Wien
18	MF	(Slovenia) Milenko Ačimovič	15 February 1977 (aged 24)		(Slovenia) Olimpija
19	FW	(Slovenia) Senad Tiganj	28 August 1975 (aged 26)		(Slovenia) Olimpija

== Results ==
All times given in Hong Kong Time (UTC+8).

=== Semi-finals ===
29 January 2002

Honduras	5–1	Slovenia
S. Martínez 39', 58', 69', 72'; C. Martínez 90'		Zahovic 52' (pen.)

Hong Kong Stadium, Hong Kong
Attendance: 26,244
Referee: Toru Kamikawa (Japan)
29 January 2002

Hong Kong League XI	1–1	China
Filho 70'		Yu 64'
Penalties
	4–3

Hong Kong Stadium, Hong Kong
Attendance: 26,244
Referee: Kim Tae-young (South Korea)

=== Third place match ===
1 February 2002

China	0–0 (a.e.t.)	Slovenia
Penalties
	3–4

Hong Kong Stadium, Hong Kong
Attendance: 30,329
Referee: Kim Tae-young (South Korea)

=== Final ===
1 February 2002

Hong Kong League XI	0–1	Honduras
		S. Martínez 67'

Hong Kong Stadium, Hong Kong
Attendance: 30,329
Referee: Toru Kamikawa (Japan)

== Bracket ==
Semi-finals
29 January 2002 – Hong Kong
Honduras	5
Slovenia	1
29 January 2002 – Hong Kong
Hong Kong League XI (pen.)	1 (4)
China	1 (3)

Final
1 February 2002 – Hong Kong
Honduras	1
Hong Kong League XI	0
Third place
1 February 2002 – Hong Kong
Slovenia (pen.)	0 (4)
China	0 (3)

2002 Carlsberg Cup champions

Honduras
First title

== Statistics ==
=== Goalscorers ===
There were 9 goals scored in 4 matches, for an average of 2.25 goals per match.

5 goals

- (Honduras) Saul Martínez

1 goal

- (China) Yu Genwei
- (Honduras) Cristián Martínez
- (Hong Kong) Aderbal Filho
- (Slovenia) Zlatko Zahovič

== See also ==
- Hong Kong Football Association
- Hong Kong First Division League
