= 1993–94 Honduran Liga Nacional =

Liga Nacional
- Season: 1993–94
- Champions: Real España (7th)
- Relegated: Petrotela
- CONCACAF Champions' Cup: Real España; Motagua
- Matches: 147
- Goals: 301 (2.05 per match)
- Top goalscorer: Pineda (12)

The 1993–94 Honduran Liga Nacional season was the 28th edition of the Honduran Liga Nacional. The format of the tournament consisted of a three round-robin schedule followed by a 6-team playoff round. Real C.D. España won the title after winning the regular season and the final round and qualified to the 1995 CONCACAF Champions' Cup along with runners-up C.D. Motagua.

== 1993–94 teams ==
- Deportes Progreseño (promoted)
- Marathón
- Motagua
- Olimpia
- Petrotela
- Platense
- Real España
- Real Maya
- Victoria
- Vida

== Regular season ==
=== Standings ===
Pos	Team	Pld	W	D	L	GF	GA	GD	Pts	Qualification or relegation
1	Real España (Note: Real España clinched final spot as regular season winner.)	27	14	12	1	34	17	+17	40	Qualified to the Final round (Note: Top 6 qualify for final round.)
2	Olimpia	27	13	10	4	43	29	+14	36	Qualified to the Final round
3	Victoria	27	7	14	6	31	25	+6	28	Qualified to the Final round
4	Motagua	27	7	12	8	28	27	+1	26	Qualified to the Final round
5	Vida	27	7	12	8	19	32	−13	26	Qualified to the Final round
6	Platense	27	7	11	9	29	27	+2	25	Qualified to the Final round
7	Real Maya	27	7	11	9	19	20	−1	25	
8	Marathón	27	6	12	9	25	29	−4	24	
9	Deportes Progreseño	27	6	10	11	26	33	−7	22	
10	Petrotela	27	4	10	13	24	39	−15	18	Relegated to Segunda División (Note: Petrotela relegated.)

== Final round ==
=== Hexagonal ===
1 May 1994 1st leg	Platense	0–4	Real España	Puerto Cortés, Cortés
			Gallegos; Velásquez; López	Stadium: Estadio Excélsior

7 May 1994 2nd leg	Real España	1–1	Platense	San Pedro Sula, Cortés
	Gallegos		Caballero	Stadium: Estadio Francisco Morazán

- Real España won 5–1 on aggregated.

1 May 1994 1st leg	Motagua	1–1	Victoria	Tegucigalpa, Francisco Morazán
				Stadium: Estadio Tiburcio Carías Andino

7 May 1994 2nd leg	Victoria	0–1	Motagua	La Ceiba, Atlántida
				Stadium: Estadio Nilmo Edwards

- Motagua won 2–1 on aggregated.

1994 1st leg	Vida	2–1	Olimpia	La Ceiba, Atlántida
				Stadium: Estadio Nilmo Edwards

8 May 1994 2nd leg	Olimpia	2–3	Vida	Tegucigalpa, Francisco Morazán
	Arriola 75'; Laje 79'		38' 78' Piedy; 87' Marson	Stadium: Estadio Tiburcio Carías Andino

- Vida won 5–3 on aggregated.

=== Triangular standings ===
Pos	Team	Pld	W	D	L	GF	GA	GD	Pts
1	Real España (Note: Real España champions as winner of Regular season and Final round.)	4	1	3	0	2	1	+1	5
2	Motagua (Note: Motagua runner-up as second place in Triangular.)	4	1	2	1	3	3	0	4
3	Vida	4	0	3	1	1	2	−1	3

== Top scorer ==
- (Honduras) Alex Pineda Chacón (Olimpia) with 12 goals

== Squads ==
Deportes Progreseño
(Honduras) Gerardo Acosta	(Honduras) José Luis “Joche” Alvarado	(Honduras) Juan Manuel “Nito” Anariba
(Honduras) Pablo Bernárdez	(Honduras) Mario Castillo	(Honduras) Edith Hernando Contreras
(Honduras) Oscar Gerardo "Maradona" Cruz	(Honduras) Gabriel Figueroa	(Honduras) Marco Antonio “Tono” García
(Honduras) Marco Antonio Gómez	(Honduras) Alberto Güity	(Honduras) Eduardo Laing
(Honduras) Milton “Tyson” Núñez	(Honduras) Roy Arturo Padilla Bardales	(Honduras) Omar Pérez
(Honduras) Gabriel Pinto
Marathón
(Honduras) Dangelo Daltino Bautista	(Honduras) Melvin Sabillón	(Honduras) Walter "Gualala" Trejo
(Honduras) Alfonso Sabillón	(Honduras) Nicolás Suazo Velásquez	(Honduras) Mario Beata
(Honduras) Luis Orlando "El Chinito" Reyes Santos	(Honduras) José Ulloa Villatoro	(Honduras) Luis Alexander Quezada
(Honduras) Ciro Paulino "Palic" Castillo	(Honduras) Víctor Coello
Motagua
(Guatemala) Julio César Englenton Chuga	(Honduras) Marvin Geovany "Mango" Henríquez	(Honduras) Marvin Fonseca
(Uruguay) Alvaro Roberto Izquierdo	(Honduras) Renán Aguilera	(Honduras) Carlos Mejía
(Honduras) Carlos Tejeda	(Honduras) Carlos Zelaya	(Honduras) Jorge "Babington" López
(Honduras) Oscar Duarte	(Honduras) Víctor López	(Honduras) Oscar Pineda Torres
(Honduras) German Bermúdez	(Uruguay) Jorge González	(Honduras) Ramón "Monchín" Rodríguez
(Honduras) Oscar Murillo	(Honduras) Renán Aguilera	(Honduras) Walter Lagos Aplícano
(Honduras) Miguel "Hino" Mathews	(Uruguay) Gustavo Luca	(Honduras) Henry Guevara
(Honduras) German "Ñato" Rodríguez	(Honduras) Héctor Caballero	(Brazil) Rui Freitas
(Honduras) Presley Carson	(Honduras) Giovanni "Venado" Castro	(Honduras) Donaldo Reyes Guillén
(Honduras) Rosman Calderón	(Honduras) Jorge Romero	(Uruguay) Néstor Fernández
(Honduras) Edgar Sierra	(Honduras) Carlos Rodríguez	(Honduras) José Manuel Vallecillo
(Honduras) Víctor Bennet	(Honduras) Saturnino Norales	(Honduras) Hernaín Arzú
(Honduras) Carlos Matamoros	(Honduras) Marlon Núñez	(Honduras) Fabricio Pérez
(Honduras) Jorge Cruz Murillo	(Honduras) Alex Geovany Ávila	(Honduras) César Augusto "Nene" Obando
(Honduras) Javier Padilla	(Honduras) Ramón Romero	(Honduras) Juan Manuel "Gato" Coello
Olimpia
(Honduras) Alex Pineda Chacón	(Uruguay) Carlos José Laje Moreno	(Honduras) José Luis "Flaco" Pineda
(Honduras) Nahúm Alberto Espinoza Zerón	(Honduras) Eduardo Arriola	(Honduras) Christian Santamaría
(Honduras) Rudy Alberto Williams	(Honduras) Wilmer Neal "Matador" Velásquez	(Brazil) Denilson Costa de Oliveira
(Honduras) Merlyn Membreño	(Honduras) Gilberto Gerónimo Yearwood
Petrotela
(Honduras) Julio César "El Tile" Arzú	(Honduras) Juan Pablo Centeno	(Honduras) Alexis Iván Duarte
(Honduras) Carlos Fernando Landa	(Honduras) Víctor Orlando Garay	(Honduras) José Luis "Pili" Aguirre
(Honduras) Gustavo Cálix	(Honduras) Pastor Martínez	(Honduras) Neptaly Fúnez
(Honduras) Mateo Ávila Benedict	(Honduras) Tomás Róchez	(Uruguay) Julio María Lemos
(Honduras) Luis "Gavilán" Cálix	(Honduras) Christian Santamaría	(Chile) Alfredo Saavedra
(Honduras) David Logan	(Honduras) Edwin Rodríguez	(Honduras) Hibrain Maldonado
(Honduras) Carlos Reyes	(Honduras) Neptalí Funes	(Honduras) Nigel Zuniga
(Honduras) Golbin Bonilla	(Honduras) L. Midence	(Honduras) M. Pitillo
(Honduras) J. Bernárdez	(Honduras) Nelson Sambula	(Honduras) O. Centeno
Platense
(Honduras) Marlon Javier Monge	(Honduras) Rossel Cacho	(Honduras) Miguel Ángel "Gallo" Mariano
(Honduras) José Luis "Runga" Piota	(Honduras) Mauricio Edgardo Figueroa	(Honduras) Carlos Roberto Velásquez
(Honduras) Jorge Arita Neals
Real España
(Honduras) Wilmer Enrique "Supermán" Cruz	(Honduras) Milton "Chocolate" Flores	(Honduras) José Mauricio "Guicho" Fúnez Barrientos
(Honduras) Juan Ramón "Montuca" Castro	(Uruguay) Enrique Daniel Uberti García	(Uruguay) Washington Leonardo "Piojo" Hernández
(Honduras) Marco Vinicio "Chacal" Ortega	(Honduras) Víctor Martín Castro	(Honduras) Edward Barahona
(Honduras) Reginaldo Hill	(Honduras) Vinicio "Chacal" Ortega	(Honduras) Javier Guzmán
(Brazil) Sebastiao Da Silva	(Honduras) Marco Antonio Anariba Zepeda	(Honduras) Gustavo Adolfo Gallegos
(Honduras) Camilo Bonilla	(Honduras) Edgardo Emilson Soto Fajardo	(Honduras) Carlos Alberto Pavón Plummer
(Honduras) Luis Danilo Perdomo Velásquez	(Honduras) José Luis López Escobar	(Honduras) Jaime "Indio" Ruiz
(Honduras) Rodolfo Richardson Smith	(Honduras) Luis Arriola Carter	(Honduras) Luis Danilo Perdomo Velásquez
(Honduras) Norman "Tedy" Martínez	(Honduras) Erick Gerardo Gallegos
Real Maya
(Honduras) Juan Fernando Palacios	(Honduras) Juan Ramon Palacios	(Honduras) Jose Luis MArtinez
(Honduras) J. Melendez	(Honduras) Alexander Leroy Wood	(Honduras) Nelson Rosales
(Honduras) Tomas Centeno	(Honduras) M. A. Valdez	(Honduras) Edgar Antonio Figueroa
(Honduras) Edwin Yánez	(Honduras) Oscar Lagos	(Honduras) M. Godoy
(Honduras) Arturo "Pando" Arriola	(Honduras) Víctor Sebastián Zúniga	(Honduras) Edgardo Geovany "Yura" Róchez
Victoria
(Honduras) Jorge Alberto "Bala" Bennett	(Honduras) José Antonio García Bernárdez	(Honduras) Luis Armando Fino
(Honduras) Enrique Reneau	(Honduras) Luis Orellana	(Honduras) Renán "Chimbo" Aguilera Contreras
Vida
(Honduras) Víctor Lorenzo Crisanto "Pata de Rifle" Batiz	(Honduras) Mario Peri	(Honduras) Carlos Güity
(Honduras) Dennis Antonio Piedy	(Honduras) René Arturo David "Pupa" Martínez	(Honduras) Juan José Larios
(Honduras) Troy Anderson	(Honduras) Miguel Arcángel Güity	(Honduras) Jorge Ernesto Pineda
(Honduras) Raúl Centeno Gamboa	(Honduras) Clayd Lester Marson	(Honduras) Carlos Ramon Matamoros Bustillo

== Known results ==
=== Week 1 ===
1993-10-03

Platense	4–0	Vida
Velásquez

Puerto Cortés
1993-10-03

Real España	3–1	Motagua
Perdomo; Guzmán; Soto		Izquierdo

San Pedro Sula

Olimpia	2–1	Marathón
Costa

Tegucigalpa

=== Week 6 ===
Week 6	Vida	1–0	Real España	La Ceiba
				Stadium: Estadio Nilmo Edwards

=== Triangular ===
12 May 1994

Motagua	1–1	Real España

Tegucigalpa
21 May 1994

Real España	1–0	Motagua
Hernández

San Pedro Sula
24 May 1994

Vida	0–0	Real España

La Ceiba

Motagua	1–0	Vida

Tegucigalpa

=== Unknown rounds ===
6 October 1993	Real España	2–1	Petrotela	San Pedro Sula
	Pavón			Stadium: Estadio Francisco Morazán

10 October 1993	Vida	0–1	Victoria	La Ceiba
			Reneau	Stadium: Estadio Nilmo Edwards; Referee: Abad Solórzano
Note: Match suspended at 40' (0–1) as Victoria's players tried to attack the referee by not accepting a controversial penalty. Vida was awarded the win.

16 October 1993	Real España	1–0	Real Maya	San Pedro Sula
	Pavón			Stadium: Estadio General Francisco Morazán

17 October 1993	Platense	3–4	Olimpia	Puerto Cortés
			Membreño; Velásquez; Espinoza	Stadium: Estadio Excélsior

3 November 1993	Real España	1–1	Deportes Progreseño	San Pedro Sula
				Stadium: Estadio General Francisco Morazán

7 November 1993	Vida	1–0	Real España	La Ceiba
				Stadium: Estadio Nilmo Edwards

12 December 1993	Real Maya	1–2	Deportes Progreseño

2 March 1994	Real España	2–0	Petrotela	San Pedro Sula
	Pavón			Stadium: Estadio General Francisco Morazán

20 March 1994	Olimpia	1–0	Motagua	Tegucigalpa
	Espinoza			Stadium: Estadio Tiburcio Carías Andino

27 March 1994	Olimpia	v	Petrotela

10 April 1994	Olimpia	2–1	Motagua	Tegucigalpa
	Velásquez			Stadium: Estadio Tiburcio Carías Andino

17 April 1994	Vida	1–2	Deportes Progreseño

24 April 1994	Deportes Progreseño	3–1	Petrotela	El Progreso
	Laing; Contreras; Padilla		Garay	Stadium: Estadio Humberto Micheletti

24 April 1994	Platense	1–2	Real España	Puerto Cortés
			Pavón	Stadium: Estadio Excélsior

Olimpia	2–2	Real España

Platense	0–0	Victoria	Puerto Cortés
			Stadium: Estadio Excélsior
