= Darixon Vuelto =

Honduran footballer (born 1998)

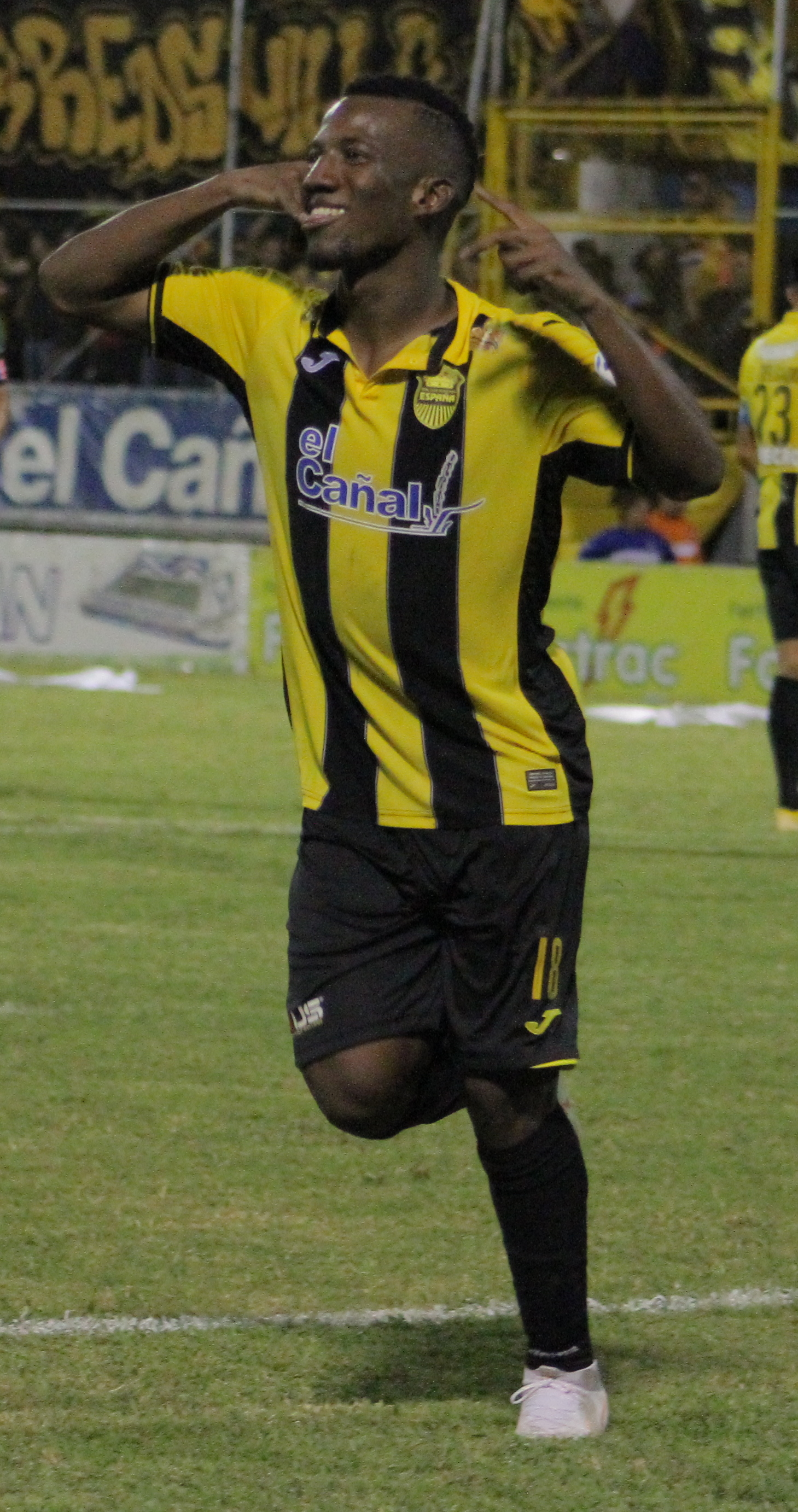
- Vuelto in 2018

Personal information
- Full name: Darixon Eniel Vuelto Pérez
- Date of birth: 15 January 1998 (age 28)
- Place of birth: Sambo Creek, Honduras
- Height: 1.74 m (5 ft 9 in)
- Position: Forward

Team information
- Current team: Real España
- Number: 11

Youth career
- Victoria

Senior career*
Years	Team	Apps	(Gls)
2013–2020	Victoria	46	(3)
2016–2017	→ Tenerife (loan)	0	(0)
2017–2018	→ Real España (loan)	28	(10)
2018	→ Portland Timbers 2 (loan)	9	(0)
2018–2020	→ Real España (loan)	55	(16)
2020–	Real España	86	(15)
2022	→ Saprissa (loan)	8	(0)

International career^{‡}
2015	Honduras U17	3	(0)
2017	Honduras U20	9	(2)
2019–2021	Honduras U23	8	(5)
2019–	Honduras	3	(0)
Medal record
Representing Honduras
Men's football
Pan American Games
Silver medal – second place	2019 Lima	Team competition
- * Club domestic league appearances and goals as of 22 September 2023 ‡ National team caps and goals as of 26 November 2021

Darixon Eniel Vuelto Pérez (born 15 January 1998) is a Honduran professional footballer who plays as a forward for Real España and the Honduras national team.

== Club career ==
Born in Sambo Creek, Vuelto started playing in Victoria's youth setup. He made his senior debut for the club on 8 September 2013, aged only 15, starting in a 1–2 away loss against Olimpia.

On 16 October 2014 Vuelto scored his first goal as a senior, netting the equalizer in a 1–1 home draw against Marathón. In May of the following year he went on a trial at Danish Superliga club FC Midtjylland, but nothing came of it.

On 7 June 2016, Vuelto signed a one-year loan deal for Spanish Segunda División side Tenerife, for a fee of €12,000. Initially assigned to the reserves, he spent the whole pre-season with the main squad.

== International career ==
Vuelto made his debut for Honduras national team on 14 November 2019 in a CONCACAF Nations League game against Martinique.

== Honours ==
Honduras Youth

- Pan American Silver Medal: 2019
