= 1992–93 Honduran Segunda División =

Honduran Segunda División
- Season: 1992–93
- Champions: Deportes Progreseño
- Promoted: Deportes Progreseño
- All statistics correct as of 28 March 1993.

The 1992–93 Honduran Segunda División was the 26th season of the Honduran Segunda División. Under the management of Marco Cano, Deportes Progreseño won the tournament after finishing first in the final round (or Hexagonal) and obtained promotion to the 1993–94 Honduran Liga Nacional.

== Final round ==
Also known as Hexagonal.

=== Standings ===
Pos	Team	Pld	W	D	L	GF	GA	GD	Pts	Promotion
1	Deportes Progreseño	0	0	0	0	0	0	0	0	Promotion to Liga Nacional
2	Palestino	0	0	0	0	0	0	0	0	
3	missing	0	0	0	0	0	0	0	0	
4	missing	0	0	0	0	0	0	0	0	
5	missing	0	0	0	0	0	0	0	0	
6	missing	0	0	0	0	0	0	0	0	

=== Known results ===
28 March 1993	Deportes Progreseño	3–0	Palestino	El Progreso, Yoro
				Stadium: Estadio Humberto Micheletti
