= Andrés Núñez =

Costa Rican footballer (born 1976)

Personal information
- Full name: Andrés Núñez Vargas
- Date of birth: 27 July 1976 (age 50)
- Place of birth: San José, Costa Rica
- Height: 1.76 m (5 ft 9 in)
- Positions: Winger; rightback

Senior career*
Years	Team	Apps	(Gls)
1997–1999	Santa Bárbara	0	(0)
2000–2001	Cartaginés	22	(3)
2001–2010	Saprissa	194	(12)
2010	Brujas	15	(6)
2011	Herediano	8	(0)
2011–2012	Jacó Rays	0	(0)
2012–2014	UCR	25	(2)
2014–2015	Municipal Grecia	0	(0)

International career
2001–2008	Costa Rica	10	(1)
- * Club domestic league appearances and goals as of June 1, 2008

Andrés Núñez Vargas (born July 27, 1976) is a Costa Rican football player who currently plays as a winger for Universidad.

== Club career ==
Before being transferred to Saprissa in 2001, Núñez played for Santa Bárbara and Cartaginés.

With Saprissa he has already won two national championships, a UNCAF Cup and a CONCACAF Champions Cup title, and was part of the team that played the 2005 FIFA Club World Championship, where Saprissa finished third behind São Paulo and Liverpool. He left them in summer 2010 and later played for Brujas and Herediano before joining Jacó Rays in Segunda División.

== International career ==
Núñez made his debut for Costa Rica in a May 2001 UNCAF Nations Cup match against Guatemala and has earned a total of 10 caps, scoring 1 goal. He represented his country in 1 FIFA World Cup qualification match and played at the 2007 CONCACAF Gold Cup.

His final international was a June 2008 FIFA World Cup qualification match against Grenada.

== Career statistics ==
=== International ===
Appearances and goals by national team and year
National team	Year	Apps	Goals
Costa Rica	2001	4	1
Costa Rica	2002	–	
Costa Rica	2003	–	
Costa Rica	2004	–	
Costa Rica	2005	–	
Costa Rica	2006	–	
Costa Rica	2007	4	0
Costa Rica	2008	2	0
Total		10	1

Scores and results list Costa Rica's goal tally first, score column indicates score after each Nuñéz goal.

List of international goals scored by Andres Nuñéz
No.	Date	Venue	Opponent	Score	Result	Competition
1	27 February 2001	Estadio Olímpico Metropolitano, San Pedro Sula, Honduras	Guatemala	1–1	1–1	2001 UNCAF Nations Cup
