= 2001 UNCAF Nations Cup =

Copa de Naciones Uncaf

Tournament details
- Host country: Honduras
- Dates: 23 May–3 June 2001
- Teams: 7 (from 1 sub-confederation)

Final positions
- Champions: Guatemala (1st title)
- Runners-up: Costa Rica
- Third place: El Salvador
- Fourth place: Panama

Tournament statistics
- Matches played: 15
- Goals scored: 54 (3.6 per match)
- Top scorer(s): (Panama) Jorge Dely Valdés (6 goals)

The 2001 UNCAF Nations Cup was played in Honduras.

== Participating teams ==
Team	Appearance	Previous best performance
Belize	3rd	First round (1995, 1999)
Costa Rica	6th	Champions (1991, 1997, 1999)
El Salvador	6th	3rd place (1995, 1997)
Guatemala	5th	Runners-up (1995, 1997, 1999)
Honduras (Hosts)	6th	Champions (1993, 1995)
Nicaragua	3rd	First round (1997, 1999)
Panama	4th	Third place (1993)

== Venues ==
Tegucigalpa	San Pedro Sula	La Ceiba
Estadio Tiburcio Carías Andino	Estadio Olímpico Metropolitano	Estadio Nilmo Edwards
Capacity: 35,000	Capacity: 40,000	Capacity: 18,000
2001 UNCAF Nations Cup is located in Honduras		Puerto Cortés
2001 UNCAF Nations Cup is located in Honduras		Estadio Excélsior
2001 UNCAF Nations Cup is located in Honduras		Capacity: 7,910

== First round ==
=== Group 1 ===
Pos	Team	Pld	W	D	L	GF	GA	GD	Pts	Qualification
1	El Salvador	3	2	1	0	6	2	+4	7	Qualified to Final Round
2	Panama	3	2	0	1	9	3	+6	6	Qualified to Final Round
3	Honduras	3	1	1	1	12	5	+7	4	
4	Nicaragua	3	0	0	3	2	19	−17	0	

23 May 2001

El Salvador	3–0	Nicaragua
Rodríguez 1', 37'; González 2'

Estadio Excélsior, Puerto Cortés
23 May 2001

Honduras	1–2	Panama
M. Núñez 45'		Ju. Dely 35'; Jo. Dely 68'

Estadio Olímpico Metropolitano, San Pedro Sula

25 May 2001

El Salvador	2–1	Panama
Corrales 58'; Canjura 90'		Jo. Dely 90'

Estadio Tiburcio Carías Andino, Tegucigalpa
25 May 2001

Honduras	10–2	Nicaragua
Guerrero 22'; Pavón 24', 33', 82'; Rosales 38'; Solórzano 54' (o.g.); M. Núñez 72', 80'; Martínez 75', 76'		Webster 12'; Bermúdez 86'

Estadio Olímpico Metropolitano, San Pedro Sula

27 May 2001

Nicaragua	0–6	Panama
		Jo. Dely 27', 30', 68'; Cubillas 42'; Ju. Dely 54'; Anderson 83'

Estadio Excélsior, Puerto Cortés
27 May 2001

Honduras	1–1	El Salvador
Turcios 41'		Umanzor 90'

Estadio Olímpico Metropolitano, San Pedro Sula

=== Group 2 ===
Pos	Team	Pld	W	D	L	GF	GA	GD	Pts	Qualification
1	Costa Rica	2	1	1	0	5	1	+4	4	Qualified to Final Round
2	Guatemala	2	0	2	0	4	4	0	2	Qualified to Final Round
3	Belize	2	0	1	1	3	7	−4	1	

23 May 2001

Belize	0–4	Costa Rica
		Fonseca 27' (pen.), 37', 85'; Marín 58'

Estadio Olímpico Metropolitano, San Pedro Sula

25 May 2001

Belize	3–3	Guatemala
Frazer 34', 44'; Leslie 59'		Chen 23'; García 26', 85'

Estadio Nilmo Edwards, La Ceiba

27 May 2001

Costa Rica	1–1	Guatemala
A. Núñez 45'		Acevedo 70' (pen.)

Estadio Olímpico Metropolitano, San Pedro Sula

== Final round ==
Pos	Team	Pld	W	D	L	GF	GA	GD	Pts	Qualification
1	Guatemala	3	2	1	0	5	1	+4	7	Champions and qualified to 2002 CONCACAF Gold Cup
2	Costa Rica	3	1	1	1	3	4	−1	4	Qualified to 2002 CONCACAF Gold Cup
3	El Salvador	3	0	3	0	2	2	0	3	Qualified to 2002 CONCACAF Gold Cup
4	Panama	3	0	1	2	3	6	−3	1	Enters a play-off for 2002 CONCACAF Gold Cup

30 May 2001

El Salvador	0–0	Guatemala

Estadio Olímpico Metropolitano, San Pedro Sula
30 May 2001

Costa Rica	2–1	Panama
Gómez 42'; Centeno 84'		Ju. Dely 46'

Estadio Olímpico Metropolitano, San Pedro Sula

1 June 2001

El Salvador	1–1	Panama
Ramírez 11'		Anderson 80'

Estadio Tiburcio Carías Andino, Tegucigalpa
1 June 2001

Costa Rica	0–2	Guatemala
		Pezzarossi 1'; Estrada 51'

Estadio Tiburcio Carías Andino, Tegucigalpa

3 June 2001

Costa Rica	1–1	El Salvador
Centeno 55'		Galdámez 40'

Estadio Olímpico Metropolitano, San Pedro Sula
3 June 2001

Guatemala	3–1	Panama
Pezzarossi 15'; Acevedo 33'; Garcia 89'		Jo. Dely 67'

Estadio Olímpico Metropolitano, San Pedro Sula

== Champions ==
2001 UNCAF Nations Cup winner

Guatemala
First title

- Guatemala, Costa Rica and El Salvador qualified automatically for 2002 CONCACAF Gold Cup. Panama enters a playoff for qualification against Cuba.

== Goalscorers ==
6 goals

- (Panama) Jorge Dely Valdés

3 goals

- (Costa Rica) Rolando Fonseca
- (Guatemala) Freddy García
- (Honduras) Milton Núñez
- (Honduras) Carlos Pavón
- (Panama) Julio Dely Valdés

2 goals

- (Belize) Dion Frazer
- (Costa Rica) Walter Centeno
- (El Salvador) Jorge Rodríguez
- (Guatemala) Mario Acevedo
- (Guatemala) Dwight Pezzarossi
- (Honduras) Jairo Martínez
- (Panama) Alfredo Anderson

1 goal

- (Belize) Mark Leslie
- (Costa Rica) Rónald Gómez
- (Costa Rica) Luis Marín
- (Costa Rica) Andrés Núñez
- (El Salvador) Héctor Canjura
- (El Salvador) Rudis Corrales
- (El Salvador) Josué Galdámez
- (El Salvador) Fredy González
- (El Salvador) Francisco Ramírez
- (El Salvador) Deris Umanzor
- (Guatemala) Denis Chen
- (Guatemala) Walter Estrada
- (Honduras) Iván Guerrero
- (Honduras) Jaime Rosales
- (Honduras) Danilo Turcios
- (Nicaragua) José María Bermúdez
- (Nicaragua) Víctor Webster
- (Panama) Juan Carlos Cubillas

1 own goal

- (Nicaragua) David Solórzano (playing against Honduras)
