= Danilo Turcios =

Honduran footballer and manager (born 1978)

Personal information
- Full name: Danilo Elvis Turcios Funez
- Date of birth: 8 May 1978 (age 48)
- Place of birth: Sonaguera, Honduras
- Height: 1.65 m (5 ft 5 in)
- Positions: Midfielder; full-back

Team information
- Current team: Juticalpa F.C. (manager)

Senior career*
Years	Team	Apps	(Gls)
1997–2000	Universidad	34	(4)
2001	Motagua		(2)
2001	Deportivo Maldonado		
2002	Defensor Sporting	33	(4)
2003	Peñarol	13	(0)
2003–2004	Tecos UAG	45	(3)
2005–2006	Olimpia		
2006–2007	Comunicaciones	15	(1)
2007–2011	Olimpia	83	(9)
2012	Atlanta Silverbacks	13	(0)
2012	Real Sociedad		
2013	UPNFM		

International career^{‡}
1999–2010	Honduras	86	(7)

Managerial career
- 2019–2020: Juticalpa F.C.
- * Club domestic league appearances and goals as of 11 July 2012 ‡ National team caps and goals as of 23 September 2026

Danilo Elvis Turcios Funez (born 8 May 1978) is a Honduran former professional football player and manager.

He was a member of the national squad at the 2000 Summer Olympics in Sydney, Australia and the 2010 FIFA World Cup in South Africa.

== Club career ==
Nicknamed el Enano (the Dwarf) because of his short build, Turcios began his professional career with Universidad of his native Honduras in 1996, making his debut in the 1997 Apertura, then he played with F.C. Motagua winning his first Honduran championship before moving to Deportivo Maldonado of Uruguay in 2001. After a year with Maldonado, he moved to Defensor Sporting, where he would last even less time, moving later in the year to Peñarol.

Turcios moved on to the Liga MX México Primera División in 2004, signing with Estudiantes Tecos. After one season with the Guadalajara-based club, he returned home to Honduras to play with Olimpia. Outside of a one-season stint with Guatemalan side Comunicaciones in 2006, Turcios was a regular fixture in Olimpia's line-up from 2005 to 2012.

He signed with Atlanta Silverbacks of the North American Soccer League in February 2012. He played the 2012 Apertura season for Real Sociedad but left the club claiming they ended his contract and demanding money. He did not plan to retire after the season, hinting to a return to Motagua, which was later denied by the club.

He finally joined Honduran second division side UPNFM for the 2013 Clausura.

== International career ==
Turcios made his debut for Honduras in a November 1999 friendly match against Trinidad & Tobago and has earned a total of 87 caps, scoring 7 goals. He has represented his country in 33 FIFA World Cup qualification matches, at the 2000 Summer Olympics and the 2010 FIFA World Cup. He also played at the 2001 and 2009 UNCAF Nations Cups as well as at the 2000, 2003 and 2005 CONCACAF Gold Cups. Also, he played at the 2001 Copa América.

His final international appearance was a June 2010 FIFA World Cup match against Switzerland.

== Managerial career ==
=== Juticalpa F.C. ===
On 8 July 2019, it was reported that Turcios was named head coach of Juticalpa F.C. in the Honduran second division.

== Career statistics ==
=== International goals ===
N.	Date	Venue	Opponent	Score	Result	Competition
1	16 July 2000	Estadio Cuscatlán, San Salvador, El Salvador	El Salvador	2–1	5–2	2002 FIFA World Cup qualification
2	8 October 2000	Estadio Tiburcio Carías Andino, Tegucigalpa, Honduras	Jamaica	1–0	1–0	2002 FIFA World Cup qualification
3	27 May 2001	Estadio Olímpico Metropolitano, San Pedro Sula, Honduras	El Salvador	1–0	1–1	2001 UNCAF Nations Cup
4	16 June 2001	Hasely Crawford Stadium, Port of Spain, Trinidad and Tobago	Trinidad and Tobago	2–0	4–2	2002 FIFA World Cup qualification
5	27 April 2003	Stade d'Honneur de Dillon, Fort-de-France, Martinique	Martinique	3–2	4–2	2003 CONCACAF Gold Cup qualification
6	9 October 2004	Estadio Olímpico Metropolitano, San Pedro Sula, Honduras	Canada	1–1	1–1	2006 FIFA World Cup qualification
7	16 July 2005	Gillette Stadium, Foxborough, USA	Costa Rica	2–0	3–2	2005 CONCACAF Gold Cup

== Honours and awards ==
CD Olimpia

- Honduran Liga Nacional: 2004–05 C, 2005–06 A, 2005–06 C, 2007–08 C, 2008–09 C, 2009–10 C, 2011–12 A

Motagua

- Honduran Liga Nacional: 2001–02 A

Honduras

- CONCACAF Men's Olympic Qualifying Tournament: 2000
