= Julio Dely Valdés =

Panamanian footballer and manager (born 1967)

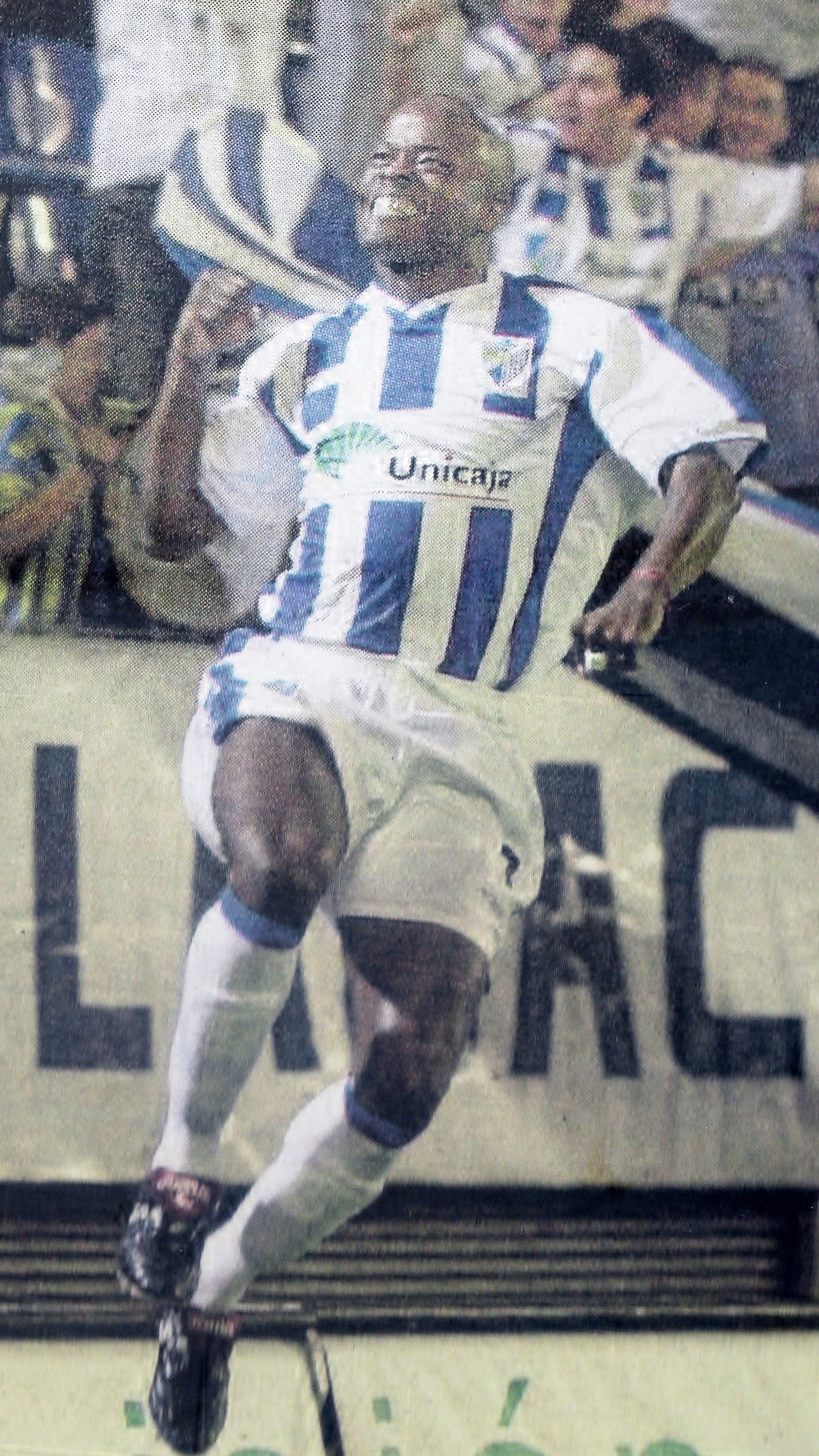
- Dely Valdés with Málaga

Personal information
- Full name: Julio César Dely Valdés
- Date of birth: March 12, 1967 (age 59)
- Place of birth: Colón, Panama
- Height: 1.87 m (6 ft 2 in)
- Position: Striker

Youth career
- 1975–1987: Atlético Colón

Senior career*
Years	Team	Apps	(Gls)
1987–1988	Deportivo Paraguayo	33	(28)
1989–1993	Nacional	89	(46)
1993–1995	Cagliari	64	(21)
1995–1997	Paris Saint-Germain	64	(23)
1997–2000	Real Oviedo	103	(39)
2000–2003	Málaga	104	(38)
2003	Nacional	15	(8)
2004–2006	Árabe Unido		
Total		472	(203)

International career
1991–2005	Panama	44	(18)

Managerial career
- 2006: Panama
- 2006: Panama U17
- 2007: Panama U20
- 2010–2013: Panama
- 2014: Árabe Unido
- 2014–2015: Águila
- 2018: Málaga B
- 2019: Panama
- * Club domestic league appearances and goals

Julio César Dely Valdés (born March 12, 1967) is a Panamanian professional football manager and former player who played as a striker.

He is the twin brother of Jorge Dely Valdés and younger brother of Armando Dely Valdés.

== Club career ==
Born in Colón, Panama, Dely Valdés began his professional career in 1987 in Argentina with Deportivo Paraguayo (after trying out with the Argentinos Juniors' squad), where he scored 28 goals. He then moved to Nacional in Uruguay, where he scored more than 100 goals and won the Primera División in 1992.

In Europe, he played for Cagliari in the Italian Serie A and Paris Saint-Germain in the French Première Division. He then played in Spain's Primera División with Real Oviedo for three seasons and with Málaga for another three. Nicknamed Panagol, he became the most prolific goal scorer in Málaga's history in the Primera División, before returning to Nacional.

He retired in 2006 after two seasons with Panamanian club Arabe Unido.

== International career ==
Dely Valdés made his debut for Panama in a May 1991 UNCAF Nations Cup match against Honduras and earned a total of 44 caps, scoring 18 goals. He represented his country in 27 FIFA World Cup qualification matches and was a member of the 2005 CONCACAF Gold Cup team, that finished second in the tournament, losing the final against USA in a penalty shootout. He also played at the 2001 and 2003 UNCAF Nations Cups.

Both he and his twin brother announced their international retirement in November 2004, but they both returned for a final Gold Cup tournament and World Cup qualification matches in 2005. His final international was an October 2005 FIFA World Cup qualification match against the United States, just as his twin brother Jorge.

== Managerial career ==
Dely Valdés became a coach after his playing career ended. He signed with his former team, Málaga, as an assistant manager for head coach Antonio Tapia. He left the club on June 16, 2010, after the arrival of new Qatari owner Abdullah bin Nasser Al Thani. The entire team and staff was rebuilt, and Dely Valdés did not have his contract renewed.

On September 14, 2010, Dely Valdés became head coach of the Panama national team after FEPAFUT chose him over the Colombian Luis Fernando Suárez. The contract was for ten months which included the Copa Centroamericana and the CONCACAF Gold Cup with an optional extension to include the FIFA World Cup qualifiers. He appointed twin brother Jorge as his assistant. They led Panama to the final round of World Cup qualifying but ultimately fell short, after which the Dely Valdés brothers were not retained as managers.

Julio was put in charge at Árabe Unido in August 2014 and was announced as the manager at Águila in El Salvador on December 31, 2014.

== Career statistics ==
Scores and results list Panama's goal tally first, score column indicates score after each Dely Valdés goal.

List of international goals scored by Julio Dely Valdés
No.	Date	Venue	Opponent	Score	Result	Competition
1	12 May 1991	Estadio Rommel Fernández, Panama City, Panama	Honduras	1–0	2–0	1991 UNCAF Nations Cup
2	2 June 1996	MCC Grounds, Belize City, Belize	Belize	2–1	2–1	1998 FIFA World Cup qualification
3	9 June 1996	Estadio Rommel Fernández, Panama City, Panama	Belize	1–0	4–1	1998 FIFA World Cup qualification
4	9 June 1996	Estadio Rommel Fernández, Panama City, Panama	Belize	2–0	4–1	1998 FIFA World Cup qualification
5	9 June 1996	Estadio Rommel Fernández, Panama City, Panama	Belize	3–1	4–1	1998 FIFA World Cup qualification
6	19 March 2000	Estadio Cacique Diriangén, Diriamba, Nicaragua	Nicaragua	2–0	2–0	2002 FIFA World Cup qualification
7	2 April 2000	Estadio Rommel Fernández, Panama City, Panama	Honduras	1–0	1–0	2002 FIFA World Cup qualification
8	21 May 2000	Estadio Rommel Fernández, Panama City, Panama	Nicaragua	1–0	4–0	2002 FIFA World Cup qualification
9	23 May 2001	Estadio Olímpico Metropolitano, San Pedro Sula, Honduras	Honduras	2–1	2–1	2001 UNCAF Nations Cup
10	30 May 2001	Estadio Olímpico Metropolitano, San Pedro Sula, Honduras	Costa Rica	1–1	1–2	2001 UNCAF Nations Cup
11	28 April 2004	Estadio Rommel Fernández, Panama City, Panama	Bermuda	2–1	4–1	Friendly
12	1 May 2004	Estadio Mateo Flores, Guatemala City, Guatemala	Guatemala	1–0	2–1	Friendly
13	1 May 2004	Estadio Mateo Flores, Guatemala City, Guatemala	Guatemala	2–0	2–1	Friendly
14	13 June 2004	Estadio Rommel Fernández, Panama City, Panama	Saint Lucia	1–0	4–0	2006 FIFA World Cup qualification
15	20 June 2004	George Odlum Stadium, Vieux Fort, Saint Lucia	Saint Lucia	2–0	3–0	2006 FIFA World Cup qualification
16	23 July 2004	Estadio Rommel Fernández, Panama City, Panama	Guatemala	1–1	1–1	Friendly
17	18 August 2004	Estadio Cuscatlán, San Salvador, El Salvador	El Salvador	1–1	1–2	2006 FIFA World Cup qualification
18	4 September 2004	National Stadium, Kingston, Jamaica	Jamaica	2–1	2–1	2006 FIFA World Cup qualification

== Honours ==
Nacional

- Primera División Uruguaya: 1992

Paris Saint-Germain

- Trophée des Champions: 1995
- UEFA Cup Winners' Cup: 1995–96

Malaga

- UEFA Intertoto Cup: 2002

Panama

- CONCACAF Gold Cup runner-up: 2005

Individual

- CONCACAF Team of the Century: 1998
- IFFHS CONCACAF Men's Team of All Time: 2021
