= Daniel Vallejos =

Costa Rican footballer (born 1981)

Personal information
- Full name: Luis Daniel Vallejos Obregón
- Date of birth: May 27, 1981 (age 45)
- Place of birth: Nicoya, Costa Rica
- Height: 1.77 m (5 ft 10 in)
- Position: Defender

Senior career*
Years	Team	Apps	(Gls)
2000–2008	Herediano	80	(0)
2009	Puntarenas	12	(0)
2009	Herediano	6	(0)
2010–2012	Santos de Guápiles	46	(3)
2012–2013	Guanacasteca	0	(0)
2013–2014	Ayutla	0	(0)
2014–2016	Puntarenas	0	(0)
2016–2018	Municipal Grecia	0	(0)
Total		144	(3)

International career
2002–2003	Costa Rica	15	(0)
- * Club domestic league appearances and goals

Luis Daniel Vallejos Obregón (born 27 May 1981 in Santa Bárbara de Santa Cruz) is a Costa Rican former professional footballer who played as a defender.

== Club career ==
A defensive midfielder, he made his debut for Herediano and played for Puntarenas. In January 2010 he left Herediano for Santos de Guápiles After playing for Santos de Guápiles, Vallejos decided to cease playing professional soccer in his country. He did however have a spell at second division Guanacasteca and played abroad for Guatemalan second division outfit Ayutla.

In summer 2014, Vallejos rejoined relegated Puntarenas in their bid to regain promotion to the Primera División.

== International career ==
Vallejos played at the 2001 FIFA World Youth Championship finals in Argentina.

Vallejos made his senior debut for the Costa Rica national football team in a friendly against Japan just before the World Cup finals on April 12, 2002 and made 15 appearances, scoring no goals. He was a surprise inclusion into the team, but became a non-playing squad member at the 2002 FIFA World Cup.

He collected his final cap in a friendly international against China in September 2003.
