= Alfredo Anderson =

Panamanian footballer (born 1978)

Personal information
- Full name: Alfredo Anderson Salazar
- Date of birth: October 31, 1978 (age 47)
- Place of birth: Colón, Panama
- Height: 1.82 m (5 ft 11 1/2 in)
- Position: Forward

Youth career
- Argentinos Juniors

Senior career*
Years	Team	Apps	(Gls)
1998	Plaza Amador		
1999	Charleston Battery	4	(0)
1999–2001	Árabe Unido		
2001	Omiya Ardija		
2001–2007	Árabe Unido		

International career
2000–2001	Panama	12	(2)
- * Club domestic league appearances and goals

Alfredo Anderson Salazar (born October 31, 1978) is a Panamanian former football player.

== Club career ==
He played in the Argentinos Juniors youth teams and for Plaza Amador before a spell with United Soccer League side Charleston Battery. In summer 1999 he joined Árabe Unido but also had another spell abroad alongside compatriot Jorge Dely Valdes with Omiya Ardija in Japan.

== International career ==
Anderson made his debut for Panama in a June 2000 friendly match against Venezuela and has earned a total of 12 caps, scoring 2 goals. He represented his country in 2 FIFA World Cup qualification matches and played at the 2001 UNCAF Nations Cup.

His final international was an August 2001 friendly against Brazil.

=== International goals ===
Scores and results list Panama's goal tally first.

#	Date	Venue	Opponent	Score	Result	Competition
1.	27 May 2001	Estadio Excélsior, Puerto Cortés, Honduras	Nicaragua	6–0	6–0	2001 UNCAF Nations Cup
2.	1 June 2001	Estadio Tiburcio Carías Andino, Tegucigalpa, Honduras	El Salvador	1–1	1–1	2001 UNCAF Nations Cup
