= Jorge Dely Valdés =

Panamanian footballer (born 1967)

Personal information
- Full name: Jorge Luis Dely Valdés
- Date of birth: March 12, 1967 (age 59)
- Place of birth: Colón, Panama
- Height: 1.82 m (6 ft 0 in)
- Position: Forward

Youth career
- 1975–1986: Atlético Colón

Senior career*
Years	Team	Apps	(Gls)
1986–1988	Central Norte		
1988–1989	Deportivo Paraguayo		
1989–1990	Porvenir		
1991	Nacional		
1992	Unión Española	30	(13)
1993–1994	Toshiba	47	(53)
1995	Cerezo Osaka	31	(19)
1996	Tosu Futures	25	(24)
1997–1998	Consadole Sapporo	60	(61)
1999–2000	Colorado Rapids	52	(17)
2001–2002	Omiya Ardija	50	(34)
2003	Kawasaki Frontale	18	(3)
2003–2005	Árabe Unido		

International career
1991–2005	Panama	48	(19)

Managerial career
- 2006: Panama
- 2006: Panama U-17
- 2006–2007: Panama U-20
- 2009–2013: Panama U-17
- 2014: Tauro
- 2015: Águila (assistant)
- 2015: Tauro
- 2018–2019: Panama U-20
- 2020–2022: Plaza Amador
- 2023–: Panama U-21
- * Club domestic league appearances and goals

Jorge Luis Dely Valdés (born March 12, 1967) is a Panamanian former footballer who played as a forward. He is a twin brother of Julio Dely Valdés and younger brother of Armando Dely Valdés.

== Club career ==
Born in Colon, Dely Valdés began his professional career in 1989 in Argentina with Deportivo Paraguayo of Argentina, where he scored 28 goals. A move to El Porvenir for the 1990 season did not prove successful, as a leg injury kept him out most of the season, and he moved to Nacional of Uruguay the next season, where he won the Uruguayan Championship in 1992. In the next year, he won the Chilean Cup championship with Unión Española.

Dely Valdés then moved to the Japan Football League, where he played with Toshiba. In his first season, 1993, he led the Japan Football scoring table with 20 goals, and improved that in 1994, again leading the league with 34. Delys Valdés was transferred to Cerezo Osaka for the 1995 season, and continued his dominance, scoring 19 goals. In the subsequent season he moved to Tosu Futures, where he scored 24 goals. For the 1998 season, Dely Valdés was signed by a Japan Football League club, Consadole Sapporo, looking to return to the first division; Jorge helped the team do just that, by scoring 40 goals in leading the team back. Dely Valdés remained with Sapporo in 1999, scoring 20 goals that season. He left them after the 1998 season.

Dely Valdés returned to CONCACAF following the 1999 J. League season to play in Major League Soccer for the Colorado Rapids. Dely Valdés continued his scoring rate in the 1999 MLS season, registering 10 goals and 6 assists in 32 games for the Rapids. He continued to score in 2000, registering another 7 goals and 1 assist in 20 games, 13 starts, for the Rapids.

He returned to Japan to play for Omiya Ardija alongside compatriot Alfredo Anderson and joined Kawasaki Frontale in 2003.

== International career ==
Jorge was a very dangerous striker for the Panama national team for over a decade, playing 27 games with the team in the 1994, 1998, 2002 and 2006 World Cup Qualifying cycles. He made his debut in a May 1991 UNCAF Nations Cup match against Honduras and earned a total of 48 caps, scoring 19 goals. He represented his country at the 1995 and 2001 UNCAF Nations Cups.

In the Gold Cup of 2005, he scored two goals and led Panama to the final match against the United States.

His final international was an October 2005 FIFA World Cup qualification match against the United States.

== Managerial career ==
On August 8, 2014, he took over as manager at Tauro in his native Panama, a position he held until leaving on December 30, 2014 to join his brother Julio at Águila in El Salvador. He returned to Tauro in May 2015, only to be replaced by Rolando Palma in October 2015.

As coach of U-20 Panama, he managed to write history for the country by helping the national team to win the first ever match in the FIFA U-20 World Cup, a 2–1 victory over Asian champions U-20 Saudi Arabia in 2019 FIFA U-20 World Cup and qualified to the round of sixteen for the first time ever in Panamanian history of the U-20 World Cup.

== Career statistics ==
=== International ===
Panama
Year	Apps	Goals
1991	1	0
1992	2	0
1993	0	0
1994	0	0
1995	2	0
1996	7	5
1997	0	0
1998	0	0
1999	1	1
2000	10	3
2001	8	7
2002	0	0
2003	0	0
2004	7	0
2005	10	3
Total	48	19

International goals

Scores and results list Panama's goal tally first.

#	Date	Venue	Opponent	Score	Result	Competition
1	30 August 1996	Commonwealth Stadium, Edmonton, Canada	Canada	1–2	1–3	1998 FIFA World Cup qualification
2	22 September 1996	Estadio Rommel Fernández, Panama City, Panama	Cuba	1–1	1–3	1998 FIFA World Cup qualification
3	10 November 1996	Estadio Cuscatlán, San Salvador, El Salvador	El Salvador	1–0	2–3	1998 FIFA World Cup qualification
4	10 November 1996	Estadio Cuscatlán, San Salvador, El Salvador	El Salvador	2–2	2–3	1998 FIFA World Cup qualification
5	15 December 1996	Estadio Rommel Fernández, Panama City, Panama	Cuba	3–0	3–1	1998 FIFA World Cup qualification
6	5 December 1999	Estadio Rommel Fernández, Panama City, Panama	Cuba	1–0	1–0	Friendly match
7	7 May 2000	Estadio Tiburcio Carías Andino, Tegucigalpa, Honduras	Honduras	1–1	1–3	2002 FIFA World Cup qualification
8	21 May 2000	Estadio Rommel Fernández, Panama City, Panama	Nicaragua	2–0	4–0	2002 FIFA World Cup qualification
9	3 September 2000	Estadio Azteca, Mexico City, Mexico	Mexico	1–3	1–7	2002 FIFA World Cup qualification
10	23 May 2001	Estadio Olímpico Metropolitano, San Pedro Sula, Honduras	Honduras	1–0	2–1	2001 UNCAF Nations Cup
11	25 May 2001	Estadio Tiburcio Carías Andino, Tegucigalpa, Honduras	El Salvador	1–2	1–2	2001 UNCAF Nations Cup
12	27 May 2001	Estadio Excélsior, Puerto Cortés, Honduras	Nicaragua	1–0	6–0	2001 UNCAF Nations Cup
13	27 May 2001	Estadio Excélsior, Puerto Cortés, Honduras	Nicaragua	2–0	6–0	2001 UNCAF Nations Cup
14	27 May 2001	Estadio Excélsior, Puerto Cortés, Honduras	Nicaragua	4–0	6–0	2001 UNCAF Nations Cup
15	27 May 2001	Estadio Excélsior, Puerto Cortés, Honduras	Nicaragua	5–0	6–0	2001 UNCAF Nations Cup
16	3 June 2001	Estadio Olímpico Metropolitano, San Pedro Sula, Honduras	Guatemala	1–2	1–3	2001 UNCAF Nations Cup
17	17 July 2005	Reliant Stadium, Houston, USA	South Africa	1–0	1–1	2005 CONCACAF Gold Cup
18	21 July 2005	Giants Stadium, East Rutherford, USA	Colombia	2–0	3–2	2005 CONCACAF Gold Cup
19	17 August 2005	Estadio Mateo Flores, Guatemala City, Guatemala	Guatemala	1–0	1–2	2006 FIFA World Cup qualification

== Honours ==
Unión Española

- Copa Chile: 1992

Panama

- CONCACAF Gold Cup runner-up: 2005

Individual

- CONCACAF Gold Cup Best XI (Honorable Mention): 2005
