= CSD Ayutla =

Association football club in Guatemala

Deportivo Ayutla
- Full name: Club Social y Deportivo Ayutla
- Nickname: "Monstruo verde" (green monster)
- Ground: Estadio Tecún Umán, Ayutla, San Marcos, Guatemala
- Capacity: 1,000
- Chairman: Rafael Pérez
- Manager: Manuel Castañeda
- League: Segunda División de Ascenso
- Website: https://twitter.com/depayutla
Home colours	Away colours

Club Social y Deportivo Ayutla is a football club from Ayutla, San Marcos, Guatemala. It currently plays on the Segunda División de Ascenso, third tier on Guatemalan football.

== Current squad ==
Note: Flags indicate national team as defined under FIFA eligibility rules; some limited exceptions apply. Players may hold more than one non-FIFA nationality.

No.	Pos.	Nation	Player
—	GK	GUA	Miguel Klee
—	GK	GUA	Fredy Pérez
—	GK	GUA	Anderson Campos
—	DF	CRC	Daniel Vallejos
—	DF	SLV	Christian Blanco
—	DF	GUA	Dennis Soto
—	MF	GUA	Ósmar López

No.	Pos.	Nation	Player
—	MF	GUA	Juan Yax
—	FW	BLZ	Randy Padilla
—	FW	BRA	Weslley Brasília
—	FW	BRA	Sandro Zamboni
—	FW	HON	Roby Norales
—	FW	HON	Milton Núñez
—	FW	CRC	Johnny Cubero
