= José María Bermúdez =

Nicaragua footballer

Personal information
- Full name: José María Bermúdez Espinoza
- Date of birth: August 15, 1975 (age 51)
- Place of birth: , Nicaragua
- Position: Forward

Senior career*
Years	Team	Apps	(Gls)
1996–1997	Diriangén		
1998–1999	Walter Ferretti		
1999–2000	Real Maya		
2000–2001	Diriangén		
2001–2002	Walter Ferretti		
2002–2005	Diriangén		
2005–2006	Walter Ferretti		

International career
1995–2001	Nicaragua	15	(2)
- * Club domestic league appearances and goals

José María Bermúdez Espinoza (born August 15, 1975) is a retired Nicaraguan soccer player and currently the Secretary General of the Nicaraguan Football Federation (FENIFUT).

Bermúdez, during his first stint at the Federation, served as Manager of National Teams and then as Secretary General in 2012.

In 2019, he returned to the Federation as Secretary General. His first role was to organize a historic match against Argentina and Bolivia, and then, a few years later, against Uruguay, Paraguay, Iran, and Qatar.

== Club career ==
Nicknamed Chema, he played for local top sides Diriangén and Walter Ferretti and had a spell at Honduran side Real Maya whom he joined in 1999. Bermúdez once scored 9 goals in one league match, in February 1997 for Diriangén against Los Pinares, a record that still stands today.

== International career ==
Bermúdez made his debut for Nicaragua in an October 1995 UNCAF Nations Cup qualification match against Panama and has earned a total of 15 caps, scoring 2 goal. He has represented his country in 6 FIFA World Cup qualification matches and played at the 1995,1997 and 2001 UNCAF Nations Cups.

His final international game was a May 2001 UNCAF Nations Cup match against Panama.

=== International goals ===
Scores and results list Honduras' goal tally first.

N.	Date	Venue	Opponent	Score	Result	Competition
1.	20 April 1997	Estadio Mateo Flores, Guatemala City, Guatemala	Guatemala	1–3	1–6	1997 UNCAF Nations Cup
2.	25 May 2001	Estadio Tiburcio Carías Andino, Tegucigalpa, Honduras	Honduras	2-10	2–10	2001 UNCAF Nations Cup

== Retirement ==
After retiring, Bermúdez became secretary-general at the Nicaraguan Football Association.
