= Víctor Webster =

Nicaraguan footballer

Personal information
- Full name: Víctor Roberto Webster Flashy
- Date of birth: 10 January 1981 (age 45)
- Place of birth: Diriamba, Nicaragua
- Height: 1.80 m (5 ft 11 in)
- Position: Forward

Senior career*
Years	Team	Apps	(Gls)
1998–1999	Pérez Zeledón		
1999–2001	Limonense		
2001–2002	Motagua		
2002–2003	Real Estelí		

International career^{‡}
1996–1997	Costa Rica U-17		
2000–2001	Nicaragua U-21		
2000–2003	Nicaragua	15	(2)
- * Club domestic league appearances and goals ‡ National team caps and goals as of 18 January 2014

Víctor Roberto Webster Flashy (born 10 January 1981) is a retired Nicaraguan footballer.

== Club career ==
Born in Nicaragua but raised in Costa Rica, Webster played for the AD Limonense youths before making his senior debut with Pérez Zeledón. He later played for AD Limonense, joined Honduran giants F.C. Motagua in summer 2001 and moved to Real Estelí a year later.

== International career ==
He has represented the Costa Rica national under-17 football team and the Nicaragua U-21's for whom he scored 3 goals at the 2001 Central American Games.

He made his senior debut for Nicaragua in a March 2000 World Cup qualification match against Guatemala and has earned a total of 15 caps, scoring 2 goals. He has represented his country in 3 FIFA World Cup qualification matches and played at the 2001 and 2003 UNCAF Nations Cups.

His final international was a February 2003 UNCAF Cup match against Panama.

=== International goals ===
Scores and results list Honduras' goal tally first.

N.	Date	Venue	Opponent	Score	Result	Competition
1.	25 May 2001	Estadio Tiburcio Carías Andino, Tegucigalpa, Honduras	Honduras	1–0	2–10	2001 UNCAF Nations Cup
2.	17 April 2012	MCC Grounds, Belize City, Belize	Belize		1–7	Friendly match

== Personal life ==
Webster was born to Alda Sáenz Flashy and Alex Webster and moved with his parents to Costa Rica when only one and a half years old.
