= Sambo Creek =

- Sambo Creek - coast with residential houses (2005)

- Location within Honduras
- Coordinates: 15°47′30″N 86°37′51″W
- Country: Honduras
- Department: Atlántida

Population (2013 census)
  - Total: 3,436
- Time zone: UTC-6 (Central America)

Sambo Creek is a traditional Garífuna village 15 kilometres (9 mi) east of La Ceiba on the Caribbean Sea north coast of Honduras.

== Culture ==
Sambo Creek has one of the largest Garifuna population in Honduras and is considered to be one of the epicenters of cultural preservation. An annual fair in June is held there and traditional dances are still practiced, like the punta.

== Demographics ==
The ethnic composition is 65% Garifuna, 35% Mestizo.

== Notable people ==
- Rolando Palacios, Honduran Olympic Sprinter.
- Milton Núñez, Honduran footballer.
