= Milton Núñez =

Honduran footballer (born 1972)

Personal information
- Full name: Milton Omar Núñez García
- Date of birth: 30 October 1972 (age 53)
- Place of birth: Sambo Creek, Honduras
- Height: 1.65 m (5 ft 5 in)
- Position: Striker

Senior career*
Years	Team	Apps	(Gls)
1991–1993	Deportes Progreseño		
1993	Real España	12	(0)
1994–1998	Comunicaciones	77	(16)
1998–1999	Nacional	40	(15)
1999–2000	PAOK	10	(0)
2000–2001	Sunderland	1	(0)
2001	Nacional	17	(4)
2002	Comunicaciones		
2002	Pachuca	18	(2)
2003–2004	Necaxa	28	(2)
2004–2005	Marathón	32	(9)
2005	Comunicaciones	11	(2)
2006–2007	Real España	41	(11)
2007–2008	Olimpia	24	(5)
2008–2009	Marathón	26	(7)
2009	Jalapa	16	(3)
2010	USAC	22	(6)
2010–2011	Comunicaciones		
2011–2017	USAC		
2018–2019	Deportivo Ayutla		
2019–2020	Victoria		

International career
1994–2008	Honduras	86	(33)
- * Club domestic league appearances and goals

Milton Omar Núñez García (born 30 October 1972), commonly known as Tyson Núñez, is a Honduran former professional footballer.

Nuñez played a few seasons in Honduras before moving abroad to play for Comunicaciones in Guatemala and for Nacional in Uruguay. He then briefly appeared for PAOK in the Super League Greece and for Sunderland in the Premier League.

== Club career ==
=== Early career ===
Born in Sambo Creek, Honduras, Nuñez played a few seasons in Honduras with Deportes Progreseño and Real España before moving abroad to play for Guatemalan side Comunicaciones and for Uruguayan club Nacional.

=== PAOK ===
In 1999, Nuñez joined Greek club PAOK.

=== Sunderland ===
In March 2000, Nuñez signed for Premier League side Sunderland. The transfer fee paid to former club Nacional was reported as £1.6 million plus a possible further £1 million in bonuses.

One theory surrounding his signing is that Peter Reid, who was the manager when Núñez was brought to the Stadium of Light, thought that he had signed Núñez's strike partner at PAOK, Adolfo Valencia, and not Núñez himself. Núñez himself claimed in an interview that Sunderland had thought that Valencia and Núñez's international team-mate Eduardo Bennett, both of whom were of a similar build, were the same player, and had watched both of them play for PAOK and Honduras respectively, assuming they had seen the same player twice. In the confusion, they had ended up signing Núñez by mistake, with the diminutive forward being the only Honduran player at PAOK. Sunderland later went to court over the transfer as Nunez was owned by Uruguayan third tier team Uruguay Montevideo at the time of his move to Wearside, although he never played for them. Nunez stayed in England for two years before returning to Nacional, after playing just once for Sunderland against Wimbledon in the league and Luton Town in the League Cup. He later played for Pachuca and Necaxa.

=== Back in Honduras ===
Núñez returned to his native Honduras in 2004 and he signed for Olimpia in summer 2007 and in June 2008 he rejoined Marathón before moving abroad again.

=== Guatemala ===
In 2009, Núñez crossed the border to play for Guatemalan side Jalapa and then joined USAC for the 2010 Clausura championship, along with Selvin Motta and former national team goalkeeper Paulo César Motta. In June 2010, he rejoined Comunicaciones before joining Universidad SC the following year.

In February 2013, a historic fine was imposed on a Guatemalan football club after fans of Heredia racially abused USAC's black striker Núñez.

Núñez left USAC in 2017 before joining third-tier team Deportivo Ayutla in September 2018.

=== Victoria ===
In June 2019, Núñez signed a contract with Victoria, where he would play alongside his son, also named Milton.

== International career ==
Tyson made his debut for Honduras in a May 1994 Miami Cup match against El Salvador and has earned a total of 86 caps, scoring 33 goals, making him third on Honduras' national team's all-time goalscorers list.

He has represented his country in 24 FIFA World Cup qualification matches and played at the 1995, 1997, 1999, 2001,2003 and 2005 UNCAF Nations Cups as well as at the 1996, 2000 and 2005 CONCACAF Gold Cups.

His final international was an October 2008 FIFA World Cup qualification match against Jamaica.

== Personal life ==
Nuñez received the nickname Tyson due to his resemblance to former heavyweight boxing champion Mike Tyson.

== Career statistics ==
=== International ===
Appearances and goals by national team and year
National team	Year	Apps	Goals
Honduras	1994	3	1
Honduras	1995	4	2
Honduras	1996	11	3
Honduras	1997	5	1
Honduras	1999	5	3
Honduras	2000	11	7
Honduras	2001	14	7
Honduras	2002	1	1
Honduras	2003	5	0
Honduras	2004	8	1
Honduras	2005	13	6
Honduras	2006	1	1
Honduras	2008	2	0
Total		83	33

Scores and results list Honduras' goal tally first, score column indicates score after each Núñez goal.

List of international goals scored by Milton Núñez
No.	Date	Venue	Opponent	Score	Result	Competition	Ref.
1	5 May 1994	Miami Orange Bowl, Miami, United States	Peru	2–1	2–1	Friendly	
2	3 December 1995	Estadio Óscar Quiteño, Santa Ana, El Salvador	Guatemala	2–0	2–0	1995 UNCAF Nations Cup	
3	10 December 1995	Estadio Cuscatlán, San Salvador, El Salvador	Guatemala	1–0	3–0	1995 UNCAF Nations Cup	
4	6 March 1996	Miami Orange Bowl, Miami, United States	Colombia	1–0	1–2	Friendly	
5	17 November 1996	Estadio Francisco Morazán, San Pedro Sula, Honduras	Saint Vincent and the Grenadines	9–2	11–3	1998 FIFA World Cup qualification	
6	17 November 1996	Estadio Francisco Morazán, San Pedro Sula, Honduras	Saint Vincent and the Grenadines	11–3	11–3	1998 FIFA World Cup qualification	
7	18 April 1997	Estadio Doroteo Guamuch Flores, Guatemala City, Guatemala	El Salvador	3–0	3–0	1997 UNCAF Nations Cup	
8	19 March 1999	Estadio Nacional, San José, Costa Rica	Belize	2–0	5–1	1999 UNCAF Nations Cup	
9	24 March 1999	Estadio Nacional, San José, Costa Rica	El Salvador	1–0	3–1	1999 UNCAF Nations Cup	
10	24 March 1999	Estadio Nacional, San José, Costa Rica	El Salvador	2–1	3–1	1999 UNCAF Nations Cup	
11	9 February 2000	Estadio Francisco Morazán, San Pedro Sula, Honduras	El Salvador	2–0	5–1	Friendly	
12	9 February 2000	Estadio Francisco Morazán, San Pedro Sula, Honduras	El Salvador	4–0	5–1	Friendly	
13	16 February 2000	Miami Orange Bowl, Miami, United States	Colombia	2–0	2–0	2000 CONCACAF Gold Cup	
14	4 March 2000	Estadio Francisco Morazán, San Pedro Sula, Honduras	Nicaragua	3–0	3–0	2002 FIFA World Cup qualification	
15	7 May 2000	Estadio Nacional Chelato Uclés, Tegucigalpa, Honduras	Panama	3–1	3–1	2002 FIFA World Cup qualification	
16	3 June 2000	Estadio Francisco Morazán, San Pedro Sula, Honduras	Haiti	1–0	4–0	2002 FIFA World Cup qualification	
17	17 June 2000	Stade Sylvio Cator, Port-au-Prince, Haiti	Haiti	2–0	3–1	2002 FIFA World Cup qualification	
18	28 February 2001	Estadio Ricardo Saprissa Aymá, San Juan de Tibás, Costa Rica	Costa Rica	2–1	2–2	2002 FIFA World Cup qualification	
19	23 May 2001	Estadio Olímpico Metropolitano, San Pedro Sula, Honduras	Panama	1–1	1–2	2001 UNCAF Nations Cup	
20	25 May 2001	Estadio Olímpico Metropolitano, San Pedro Sula, Honduras	Nicaragua	6–1	10–2	2001 UNCAF Nations Cup	
21	25 May 2001	Estadio Olímpico Metropolitano, San Pedro Sula, Honduras	Nicaragua	9–1	10–2	2001 UNCAF Nations Cup	
22	1 September 2001	RFK Stadium, Washington, D.C., United States	United States	1–1	3–2	2002 FIFA World Cup qualification	
23	1 September 2001	RFK Stadium, Washington, D.C., United States	United States	3–1	3–2	2002 FIFA World Cup qualification	
24	5 September 2001	Estadio Nacional Chelato Uclés, Tegucigalpa, Honduras	Jamaica	1–0	1–0	2002 FIFA World Cup qualification	
25	20 November 2002	Estadio Olímpico Metropolitano, San Pedro Sula, Honduras	Colombia	1–0	1–0	Friendly	
26	31 March 2004	National Stadium, Kingston, Jamaica	Jamaica	2–2	2–2	Friendly	
27	19 February 2005	Estadio Doroteo Guamuch Flores, Guatemala City, Guatemala	Nicaragua	1–0	5–1	2005 UNCAF Nations Cup	
28	19 February 2005	Estadio Doroteo Guamuch Flores, Guatemala City, Guatemala	Nicaragua	5–1	5–1	2005 UNCAF Nations Cup	
29	21 February 2005	Estadio Doroteo Guamuch Flores, Guatemala City, Guatemala	Belize	2–0	4–0	2005 UNCAF Nations Cup	
30	21 February 2005	Estadio Doroteo Guamuch Flores, Guatemala City, Guatemala	Belize	3–0	4–0	2005 UNCAF Nations Cup	
31	27 February 2005	Estadio Doroteo Guamuch Flores, Guatemala City, Guatemala	Costa Rica	1–0	1–1	2005 UNCAF Nations Cup	
32	16 July 2005	Gillette Stadium, Foxborough, United States	Costa Rica	3–0	3–2	2005 CONCACAF Gold Cup	
33	7 October 2006	Lockhart Stadium, Fort Lauderdale, United States	Guatemala	1–2	3–2	Friendly	

== Honours and awards ==
=== Club ===
Comunicaciones

- Liga Nacional de Fútbol de Guatemala (3): 1994–95, 1996–97, 1997–98

Nacional

- Uruguayan Primera División (2): 1998, 2001

Marathón

- Liga Profesional de Honduras (2): 2004–05 A, 2008–09 A

Real España

- Liga Profesional de Honduras: 2006–07 C

Olimpia

- Liga Profesional de Honduras: 2007–08 C

=== Country ===
Honduras

- Copa Centroamericana: 1995

=== Individual ===
- Liga Nacional de Fútbol de Guatemala Top Goalscorer: 1994–95
