= Mario Acevedo =

Guatemalan football forward

Personal information
- Full name: Mario Giovany Acevedo Méndez
- Date of birth: February 15, 1969 (age 57)
- Place of birth: Puerto Barrios, Guatemala
- Height: 1.79 m (5 ft 10 in)
- Position: Striker

Team information
- Current team: CD Suchitepéquez

Senior career*
Years	Team	Apps	(Gls)
- CD Suchitepéquez
- Antigua GFC
- Venados de Yucatán
1997–1998	Cobán Imperial		
2000–2009	CSD Municipal	100	(40)
2009–2010	Deportivo Heredia		

International career^{‡}
1996–2008	Guatemala	53	(5)
- * Club domestic league appearances and goals as of 24 January 2010 ‡ National team caps and goals as of 24 January 2010

Mario Giovany Acevedo Méndez (born February 15, 1969) is a Guatemalan former professional footballer who primarily played as a forward. He played for many local clubs, most famously CSD Municipal in the Guatemala's top division.

== Club career ==
Nicknamed El Coyote, Acevedo played the majority of his career with Municipal but also had stints with CD Suchitepéquez, Antigua GFC, Cobán Imperial and Mexican side Venados de Yucatán. He is the second highest all-time goalscorer in the domestic league, with 170 goals to his name.

After not being renewed his contract at the end of the 2008-2009 Clausura season, Acevedo was released by his club, and afterwards he announced his retirement from the sport. However, in September 2009, he signed with for Deportivo Heredia, and in February 2010, CD Suchitepéquez confirmed Acevedo was to rejoin them, only for Heredia not to allow him to leave. He then left Heredia in April 2010.

== International career ==
He made his debut for Guatemala in a March 1996 friendly match against Jamaica and has earned a total of 53 caps, scoring 5 goals. He has represented Guatemala in 12 FIFA World Cup qualification matches.
