= Deportes Progreseño =

Honduran football club

- Full name: Deportes Progreseño
- Ground: Estadio Humberto Micheletti; El Progreso, Honduras
- Capacity: 5,000
Home colours	Away colours

Deportes Progreseño was a Honduran football club, based in El Progreso, Honduras. The club played in the Honduran Liga Nacional for two seasons from 1993 to 1995.

== History ==
Deportes Progreseño obtained promotion to Liga Nacional on 28 March 1993 as winners of the 1992–93 Honduran Segunda División. They became the second team to represent the city of El Progreso after C.D. Honduras Progreso in the top division. They spent two years in the top division, however, they were unable to obtain good results and fell back to Segunda División short after.

== Achievements ==
- Segunda División

Winners (1): 1992–93

== League performance ==
Season	Pos.	GP	W–D–L	F:A	GD	Pts.	Playoff finish
1993–94	9th	27	6–10–11	26:33	–7	22	Didn't enter
1994–95	10th	27	4–6–17	20:54	–34	18	Didn't enter
Totals		54	10–16–28	46:87	–41	40	
