= José Luis Pineda =

Honduran footballer (born 1975)

Personal information
- Full name: José Luis Pineda Aragón
- Date of birth: 19 March 1975 (age 51)
- Place of birth: San Pedro Sula, Honduras
- Height: 1.76 m (5 ft 9 1/2 in)
- Position: Midfielder

Senior career*
Years	Team	Apps	(Gls)
1994–2006	Olimpia		
2003	→ River Plate (loan)	13	(0)
2006–2007	Platense		
2007–2008	Atlético Olanchano	8	(0)
2008–2010	Victoria	53	(0)
2012	Atlético Pinares		

International career
1996–2004	Honduras	52	(4)
- * Club domestic league appearances and goals

José Luis Pineda Aragón (born 19 March 1975) is a retired professional Honduran footballer.

== Club career ==
Nicknamed el Flaco (the Skinny One), Pineda played the majority of his career for Olimpia, winning a record 9 championship finals. In summer 2007 he joined Atlético Olanchano, then played for Victoria. He moved to second division Atlético Pinares for the 2012 Clausura.

=== Statistics ===
Team	Season	Games	Start	Sub	Goal	YC	RC
Victoria	2008-09 A	12	8	4	0	3	0

== International career ==
Pineda made his debut for Honduras in a January 1996 CONCACAF Gold Cup match against Canada and has earned a total of 52 caps , scoring 4 goals. He has represented his country in 21 FIFA World Cup qualification matches and played at the 1996 and 2000 CONCACAF Gold Cups.

His final international was an April 2004 friendly match against Panama.

=== International goals ===
Scores and results list. Honduras' goal tally first.

#	Date	Venue	Opponent	Score	Result	Competition
1.	4 March 2000	Estadio Francisco Morazán, San Pedro Sula, Honduras	Nicaragua	1–0	3–0	2002 FIFA World Cup qualification
2.	28 February 2001	Estadio Ricardo Saprissa, San José, Costa Rica	Costa Rica	1–0	2–2	2002 FIFA World Cup qualification
3.	2 May 2002	Kobe Universiade Memorial Stadium, Kobe, Japan	Japan	1–0	3–3	Friendly match
4.	11 June 2003	Estadio Olímpico Metropolitano, San Pedro Sula, Honduras	Chile	1–0	1–2	Friendly match
