= Jaime Rosales =

Honduran footballer (born 1978)

Personal information
- Full name: Jaime Heliberto Rosales Chirinos
- Date of birth: 8 June 1978 (age 48)
- Place of birth: Olanchito, Honduras
- Position: Defender

Senior career*
Years	Team	Apps	(Gls)
1997–2000	Marathón		
2000–2001	Motagua		(0)
2001–2002	Marathón	41	(4)
2002–2003	Real España		
2003–2004	Comunicaciones		
2004–2008	Victoria		
2008–2009	Olimpia	25	(2)
2010–2012	Victoria		
2012–2013	Platense	29	(1)

International career^{‡}
1999–2007	Honduras	20	(1)
- * Club domestic league appearances and goals as of 2005 ‡ National team caps and goals as of 2005

Jaime Heliberto Rosales Chirinos (born 8 June 1978) is a Honduran former football defender who last played for Platense.

== Club career ==
Rosales started his professional career at Marathón and played for several clubs in the Honduran league. Also, he had a season with Guatemalan side Comunicaciones. He joined Olimpia for the 2008–2009 season but moved to Victoria when deemed surplus to requirements by Olimpia after the 2009 Apertura.

He joined Platense for the 2012 Apertura championship.

== International career ==
Rosales made his debut for Honduras in a March 1999 UNCAF Nations Cup match against El Salvador and earned a total of 20 caps, scoring 1 goal. He represented his country in 1 FIFA World Cup qualification match and was a member of the national squad at the 2000 Summer Olympics in Sydney. Rosales played for Honduras at the 1999 Pan American Games, scoring a goal versus Jamaica in a 2–1 victory. He also played at the 1999 and 2001 UNCAF Nations Cups as well as at the 2003 CONCACAF Gold Cup.

His final international was an April 2007 friendly match against Haiti.

=== International goals ===
N.	Date	Venue	Opponent	Score	Result	Competition
1	25 May 2001	Estadio Tiburcio Carías Andino, Tegucigalpa, Honduras	Nicaragua	4–1	10–2	2001 UNCAF Nations Cup

== Honours ==
- CONCACAF Gold Cup Best XI (Reserves): 2003
