= Estadio Olímpico Metropolitano =

Football stadium in Honduras

Coordinates: 15.470094°N 88.006931°W

- El Olímpico
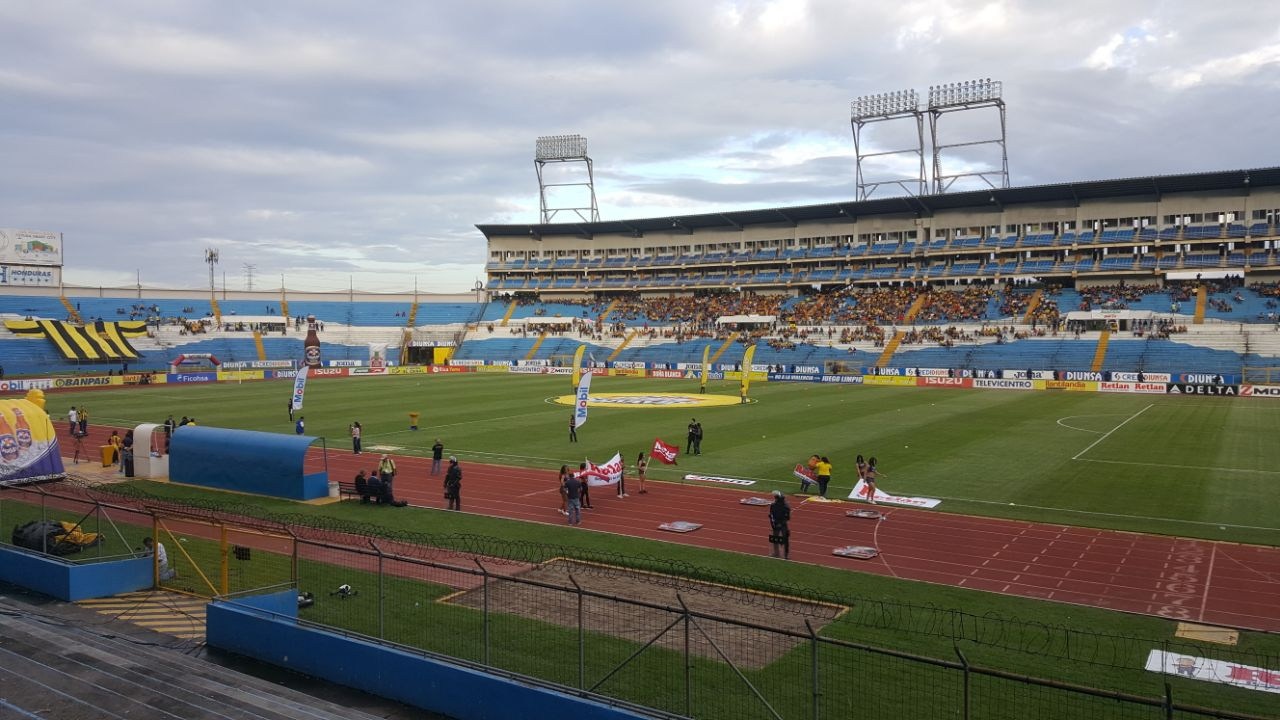
- Panoramic view
- Interactive map of Estadio Olímpico Metropolitano
- Full name: Estadio Olímpico Metropolitano
- Location: San Pedro Sula, Honduras
- Owner: San Pedro Sula
- Capacity: 37,325
- Surface: Grass
- Field size: 105 x 68

Construction
- Built: 1995–1997
- Opened: 25 September 1997

Tenants
- Honduras national football team (1997–2023); Marathón (selected matches); Real España (selected matches)

Estadio Olímpico Metropolitano is a multi-purpose stadium in San Pedro Sula, Honduras. It is currently used mostly for football matches and also has facilities for athletics. It has a capacity of 37,325.

== History ==
It was built in 1997 for the sixth edition of the Central American Games held there. This stadium was built by Jerónimo Sandoval, mostly known by "Chombo Sandoval", he was the organizer of the 1997 Central American Olympic Games in San Pedro Sula, which caused many controversies. After its completion the stadium became the largest in the country dispatching Estadio Nacional's of that title. It has been the home for Honduras national football team since the 1998 FIFA World Cup qualification, with Estadio Nacional hosting some games on and off. Upon Sandoval building the stadium, he noticed that the front of the stadium displayed a large "H" by coincidence. When this was discovered, the figure was painted blue to represent the colours of the Honduras national football team.

Before leaving office, San Pedro Sula's former mayor, Oscar Kilgore, attempted to change the name of the stadium to José de la Paz Herrera, a prominent Honduran football coach and only coach at the time that had taken Honduras to a World Cup. The move was heavily opposed by Club Deportivo Marathón and eventually abandoned.

== Matches ==
- First League game: March 1, 1998. Olimpia 3-2 Marathón with winning goals from Denilson Costa, Dolmo Flores and Rudy Williams. For Marathón, Juan 'Montuca' Castro and Jaime Rosales.
