= 2000 in American soccer =

Soccer in the United States
- Season: 2000

The 2000 season was the 88th year of competitive soccer in the United States.

== National team ==
=== Record ===
| Competition | GP | W | D | L | GF | GA |
|---|---|---|---|---|---|---|
| 2002 FIFA World Cup qualification | 6 | 3 | 2 | 1 | 14 | 3 |
| 2000 CONCACAF Gold Cup | 3 | 2 | 0 | 1 | 6 | 2 |
| 2000 U.S. Cup | 3 | 2 | 1 | 0 | 8 | 1 |
| International Friendly | 5 | 2 | 2 | 1 | 4 | 4 |
| Total | 17 | 9 | 5 | 3 | 32 | 10 |

=== Results ===
The home team or the team that is designated as the home team is listed in the left column; the away team is

in the right column.

Win Draw Loss

| January 16 International Friendly | United States | 1 – 1 | Iran | Pasadena, California |
| 14:00 UTC-08 | Armas 48' | (Report) | Mahdavikia 7' | Stadium: Rose Bowl; Attendance: 50,181; Referee: Benito Archundia (Mexico) |

| January 29 International Friendly | Chile | 1 – 2 | United States | Coquimbo, Chile |
| 22:00 UTC-03 | Riveros 57' | (Report) | Lewis 55'; Jones 88' | Stadium: Estadio Municipal Francisco Sánchez Rumoroso; Attendance: 11,000 |

| February 12 Gold Cup Group Stage | United States | 3 – 0 | Haiti | Miami, Florida |
| 19:00 UTC-05 | Kirovski 18'; Wynalda 55' (pen.); Jones 88' | (Report) | | Stadium: Orange Bowl; Attendance: 49,591 |

| February 16 Gold Cup Group Stage | Peru | 0 – 1 | United States | Miami, Florida |
| 21:00 UTC-05 | | (Report) | Jones 59' | Stadium: Orange Bowl; Attendance: 36,004 |

| February 19 Gold Cup Quarterfinal | United States | 2 – 2 (a.e.t.) (1 - 2 p) | Colombia | Miami, Florida |
| 15:00 UTC-05 | McBride 20'; Armas 51' | (Report) | Asprilla 24'; Bedoya 82' | Stadium: Orange Bowl; Attendance: 32,972 |
| | Penalties |
| | Wynalda (penalty missed); Reyna (penalty missed); Lewis (penalty scored); Armas (penalty missed); Olsen (penalty missed) | | Pérez (penalty missed); Martínez (penalty scored); Candelo (penalty missed); Mosquera (penalty scored) |

| March 12 International Friendly | United States | 1 – 1 | Tunisia | Birmingham, Alabama |
| 13:30 UTC-06 | Olsen 90+2' | (Report) | Kanzari 78' | Stadium: Legion Field; Attendance: 21,637; Referee: Peter Prendergast (Jamaica) |

| April 26 International Friendly | Russia | 2 – 0 | United States | Moscow, Russia |
| 19:00 UTC+04 | Titov 63'; Karpin 90+2' | (Report) | | Stadium: Dynamo Stadium; Attendance: 12,500 |

| June 3 U.S. Cup | United States | 4 – 0 | South Africa | Washington, D.C. |
| 16:00 UTC-04 | Jones 36', 43'; Reyna 65'; Stewart 68' | (Report) | | Stadium: RFK Stadium; Attendance: 16,570 |

| June 6 U.S. Cup | United States | 1 – 1 | Republic of Ireland | Foxborough, Massachusetts |
| 20:00 UTC-04 | Razov 68' | (Report) | Foley 31' | Stadium: Foxboro Stadium; Attendance: 16,319 |

| June 11 U.S. Cup | United States | 3 – 0 | Mexico | East Rutherford, New Jersey |
| 13:00 UTC-04 | McBride 33'; Hejduk 79'; Razov 85' | (Report) | | Stadium: Giants Stadium; Attendance: 45,008 |

| July 16 World Cup qualifying | Guatemala | 1 – 1 | United States | Mazatenango, Guatemala |
| 11:00 UTC-06 | Ruiz 88' | (Report) | Razov 45' | Stadium: Estadio Carlos Salazar Hijo; Attendance: 9,500 |

| July 23 World Cup qualifying | Costa Rica | 2 – 1 | United States | San José, Costa Rica |
| 11:00 UTC-06 | Fonseca 10'; Medford 90+3' (pen.) | (Report) | Stewart 65' | Stadium: Estadio Ricardo Saprissa; Attendance: 20,000 |

| August 16 World Cup qualifying | United States | 7 – 0 | Barbados | Foxborough, Massachusetts |
| 20:30 UTC-04 | Pope 14'; McBride 28'; Moore 45', 82'; O'Brien 46'; Ramos 72'; Stewart 74' | (Report) | | Stadium: Foxboro Stadium; Attendance: 18,334 |

| September 3 World Cup qualifying | United States | 1 – 0 | Guatemala | Washington, D.C. |
| 14:00 UTC-04 | McBride 72' | (Report) | | Stadium: RFK Stadium; Attendance: 51,996 |

| October 11 World Cup qualifying | United States | 0 – 0 | Costa Rica | Columbus, Ohio |
| 20:00 UTC-04 | | (Report) | | Stadium: Columbus Crew Stadium; Attendance: 24,430 |

| October 25 International Friendly | United States | 2 – 0 | Mexico | Los Angeles, California |
| 20:00 UTC-07 | Donovan 50'; Wolff 79' | (Report) | | Stadium: Los Angeles Memorial Coliseum; Attendance: 61,072 |

| November 15 World Cup qualifying | Barbados | 0 – 4 | United States | Saint Michael, Barbados |
| 15:00 UTC-04 | | (Report) | Mathis 63'; Stewart 73'; Jones 77'; Razov 90+3' | Stadium: Barbados National Stadium; Attendance: 4,000 |

=== Goalscorers ===
| Player | Goals |
|---|---|
| Cobi Jones | 6 |
| Brian McBride | 4 |
| Earnie Stewart | 4 |
| Ante Razov | 4 |
| Chris Armas | 2 |
| Joe-Max Moore | 2 |
| Eddie Lewis | 1 |
| Jovan Kirovski | 1 |
| Eric Wynalda | 1 |
| Ben Olsen | 1 |
| Claudio Reyna | 1 |
| Frankie Hejduk | 1 |
| Eddie Pope | 1 |
| John O'Brien | 1 |
| Tab Ramos | 1 |
| Landon Donovan | 1 |
| Josh Wolff | 1 |
| Clint Mathis | 1 |

== Major League Soccer ==
=== Standings ===
| Eastern Conference | GP | W | L | D | GF | GA | GD | Pts |
|---|---|---|---|---|---|---|---|---|
| x - MetroStars | 32 | 17 | 12 | 3 | 64 | 56 | 8 | 54 |
| x - New England Revolution | 32 | 13 | 13 | 6 | 47 | 49 | -2 | 45 |
| Miami Fusion F.C. | 32 | 12 | 15 | 5 | 54 | 56 | -2 | 41 |
| D.C. United | 32 | 8 | 18 | 6 | 44 | 63 | -19 | 30 |

| Central Conference | GP | W | L | D | GF | GA | GD | Pts |
|---|---|---|---|---|---|---|---|---|
| x - Chicago Fire | 32 | 17 | 9 | 6 | 67 | 51 | 16 | 57 |
| x - Tampa Bay Mutiny | 32 | 16 | 12 | 4 | 62 | 50 | 12 | 52 |
| x - Dallas Burn | 32 | 14 | 14 | 4 | 54 | 54 | 0 | 46 |
| Columbus Crew | 32 | 11 | 16 | 5 | 48 | 58 | -10 | 38 |

| Western Conference | GP | W | L | D | GF | GA | GD | Pts |
|---|---|---|---|---|---|---|---|---|
| s - Kansas City Wizards | 32 | 16 | 7 | 9 | 47 | 29 | 18 | 57 |
| x - Los Angeles Galaxy | 32 | 14 | 10 | 8 | 47 | 37 | 10 | 50 |
| x - Colorado Rapids | 32 | 13 | 15 | 4 | 43 | 59 | -16 | 43 |
| San Jose Earthquakes | 32 | 7 | 17 | 8 | 35 | 50 | -15 | 29 |

- Top eight teams with the highest points clinch play-off berth, regardless of conference.
  s =

Supporters Shield
x = Clinched Playoff berth.

=== Playoffs ===
Playoff bracket

Quarter-finals
1 | Kansas City Wizards (7 Points) | 1 | 0 | 3
8 | Colorado Rapids (1 Points) | 0 | 0 | 2
4 | Tampa Bay Mutiny (0 Points) | 0 | 2 | x
5 | Los Angeles Galaxy (6 Points) | 1 | 5 | x
2 | Chicago Fire (6 Points) | 2 | 1 | 6
7 | New England Revolution (3 Points) | 1 | 2 | 0
3 | MetroStars (ASDET*) (6 Points) | 2* | 2 | x
6 | Dallas Burn (0 Points) | 1 | 1 | x

Semi-finals
1 | Kansas City Wizards (SDET**) (4 Points) | 0 | 1 | 1**
5 | Los Angeles Galaxy (ASDET*) (4 Points) | 0 | 2* | 0
2 | Chicago Fire (6 Points) | 3 | 0 | 3
3 | MetroStars (3 Points) | 0 | 2 | 2

MLS Cup '00
1 | Kansas City Wizards | 1
2 | Chicago Fire | 0

- Points system
  Win = 3 Pts.
  Loss = 0 Pts.
  Draw = 1 Pt.
- ASDET*=Added Sudden Death Extra Time (Game tie breaker)
  SDET**=Sudden Death Extra Time (Series

tie breaker)
Teams will advance at 5 points.

=== MLS Cup ===
October 15

| Kansas City Wizards | 1 – 0 | Chicago Fire |
|---|---|---|
| Molnar 11' |

RFK Stadium, Washington, D.C.
Attendance: 39,159

== Lamar Hunt U.S. Open Cup ==
=== Bracket ===
Home teams listed on top of bracket

Second round
D3 | Riverside County Elite | 1
A-L | San Diego Flash | 2
MLS | Los Angeles Galaxy | 2
A-L | Seattle Sounders | 1
USASA | Stanislaus United Cruisers | 0
MLS | San Jose Earthquakes | 5
A-L | Richmond Kickers | 3
MLS | Colorado Rapids | 0
PDL | Chicago Sockers | 0 (7)
MLS | Kansas City Wizards (ASDET, PSO) | 0 (6)
MLS | Chicago Fire | 4
D3 | Texas Rattlers | 0
A-L | Minnesota Thunder | 7
USASA | Mexico SC | 0
MLS | Dallas Burn | 3
A-L | Tennessee Rhythm | 0
PDL | Cape Cod Crusaders | 0
MLS | Columbus Crew | 2
A-L | Hampton Roads Mariners | 3
D3 | Northern Virginia Royals | 2
D3 | Wilmington Hammerheads | 1
MLS | MetroStars | 2
MLS | Tampa Bay Mutiny (ASDET) | 1
USASA | Uruguay SC | 0
A-L | Charleston Battery | 0
MLS | D.C. United | 4
A-L | Pittsburgh Riverhounds | 1
A-L | Rochester Rhinos | 2
MLS | New England Revolution | 0
PDL | Mid Michigan Bucks | 1
MLS | Miami Fusion | 6
D3 | New Jersey Stallions | 1

Third round
A-L | San Diego Flash | 0
MLS | Los Angeles Galaxy | 2
MLS | San Jose Earthquakes | 2
A-L | Richmond Kickers | 0
PDL | Chicago Sockers | 0
MLS | Chicago Fire | 1
A-L | Minnesota Thunder | 0
MLS | Dallas Burn | 2
MLS | Columbus Crew | 4
A-L | Hampton Roads Mariners | 1
MLS | MetroStars | 3
MLS | Tampa Bay Mutiny | 0
MLS | D.C. United | 3
A-L | Rochester Rhinos | 0
PDL | Mid Michigan Bucks | 3 (5)
MLS | Miami Fusion (ASDET, PSO) | 3 (6)

Quarterfinals
MLS | Los Angeles Galaxy | 2
MLS | San Jose Earthquakes | 0
MLS | Chicago Fire | 5
MLS | Dallas Burn | 1
MLS | Columbus Crew (ASDET, PSO) | 1 (6)
MLS | MetroStars | 1 (7)
MLS | D.C. United | 2
MLS | Miami Fusion (ASDET) | 3

Semifinals
MLS | Los Angeles Galaxy (ASDET) | 1
MLS | Chicago Fire | 2
MLS | MetroStars | 2
MLS | Miami Fusion | 3

Finals
MLS | Chicago Fire | 2
MLS | Miami Fusion | 1

=== Final ===
October 21

| Miami Fusion | 1 – 2 | Chicago Fire |
|---|---|---|
| Wélton 90' | | Stoichkov 44'; Marshall 88' (o.g.) |

Soldier Field, Chicago, Illinois
Attendance: 19,146
Referee: Kevin Stott
