= 2002 FIFA World Cup qualification – CONCACAF semi-finals =

Football tournament

The CONCACAF Semi-final round of the CONCACAF zone of the 2002 FIFA World Cup qualification, was contested between the 12 remaining teams of the qualification process. The teams were divided into three groups of four teams each. They would play against each other on a home-and-away basis. The group winners and runners-up would advance to the Final round.

The twelve teams consisted of:

- The 4 highest-ranked teams in CONCACAF, who qualified automatically (Mexico, USA, Jamaica, Costa Rica)
- The 3 winners of the Caribbean Zone qualifiers (Barbados, Saint Vincent and the Grenadines, Trinidad and Tobago)
- The 2 group winners of the Central American Zone qualifiers (El Salvador, Panama)
- The 3 winners of the Caribbean/Central American play-offs (Canada, Guatemala, Honduras)

== Group 1 ==
Pos	Team	Pld	W	D	L	GF	GA	GD	Pts	Qualification	Trinidad and Tobago national football team	Mexico national football team	Canada men's national soccer team	Panama national football team
1	Trinidad and Tobago	6	5	0	1	14	7	+7	15	Advance to the final round	—	1–0	4–0	6–0
2	Mexico	6	4	1	1	17	2	+15	13	Advance to the final round	7–0	—	2–0	7–1
3	Canada	6	1	2	3	1	8	−7	5		0–2	0–0	—	1–0
4	Panama	6	0	1	5	1	16	−15	1		0–1	0–1	0–0	—

16 July 2000

Panama	0–1	Mexico
	Report	Zepeda 88'

Estadio Rommel Fernández, Panama City
Attendance: 21,000
Referee: Brian Hall (United States)
16 July 2000

Canada	0–2	Trinidad and Tobago
	Report	Eve 43'; Yorke 73'

Commonwealth Stadium, Edmonton
Attendance: 25,000
Referee: Rodolfo Alexander Sibrian (El Salvador)

23 July 2000

Panama	0–0	Canada
	Report

Estadio Rommel Fernández, Panama City
Attendance: 20,000
Referee: Samuel Richard (Dominican Republic)
23 July 2000

Trinidad and Tobago	1–0	Mexico
Latapy 86'	Report

Hasely Crawford Stadium, Port of Spain
Attendance: 20,000
Referee: Kevin Stott (United States)

15 August 2000

Mexico	2–0	Canada
Abundis 48'; Fenwick 81' (o.g.)	Report

Estadio Azteca, Mexico City
Attendance: 60,000
Referee: William Mattus (Costa Rica)
16 August 2000

Trinidad and Tobago	6–0	Panama
Rougier 2'; Dely Valdés 26' (o.g.); Yorke 36', 61'; Eve 59'; Pierre 77'	Report

Queen's Park Oval, Port of Spain
Attendance: 30,000
Referee: Peter Prendergast (Jamaica)

3 September 2000

Mexico	7–1	Panama
Ruiz 8' (pen.); Abundis 36'; Zepeda 44'; Blanco 47', 90' (pen.); Márquez 54'; Ramírez 75'	Report	Dely Valdés 54'

Estadio Azteca, Mexico City
Attendance: 70,000
Referee: Nelson Calix (Honduras)
3 September 2000

Trinidad and Tobago	4–0	Canada
Latapy 28'; Carrington 30'; Mason 54'; Eve 90'	Report

Queen's Park Oval, Port of Spain
Attendance: 26,000
Referee: Olger Mejia (Costa Rica)

8 October 2000

Mexico	7–0	Trinidad and Tobago
Blanco 20', 28' (pen.); Borgetti 26', 30', 71'; Davino 66'; Ruiz 75' (pen.)	Report

Estadio Azteca, Mexico City
Attendance: 50,000
Referee: Carlos Batros Gonzalez (Guatemala)
9 October 2000

Canada	1–0	Panama
Brennan 82'	Report

Winnipeg Soccer Complex, Winnipeg
Attendance: 3,000
Referee: Nery Alfaro Zepeda (El Salvador)

15 November 2000

Panama	0–1	Trinidad and Tobago
	Report	Pierre 15' (pen.)

Estadio Rommel Fernández, Panama City
Attendance: 6,000
Referee: Rodolfo Sibrian (El Salvador)
15 November 2000

Canada	0–0	Mexico
	Report

Varsity Stadium, Toronto
Attendance: 6,564
Referee: Samuel Richard (Dominican Republic)

== Group 2 ==
Pos	Team	Pld	W	D	L	GF	GA	GD	Pts	Qualification	Honduras national football team	Jamaica national football team	El Salvador national football team	Saint Vincent and the Grenadines national football team
1	Honduras	6	5	0	1	25	5	+20	15	Advance to the final round	—	1–0	5–0	6–0
2	Jamaica	6	4	0	2	7	4	+3	12	Advance to the final round	3–1	—	1–0	2–0
3	El Salvador	6	3	0	3	13	13	0	9		2–5	2–0	—	7–1
4	Saint Vincent and the Grenadines	6	0	0	6	2	25	−23	0		0–7	0–1	1–2	—

16 July 2000

El Salvador	2–5	Honduras
Montes 8'; Cienfuegos 89'	Report	Caballero 12'; Turcios 37'; Pavón 42', 62'; Suazo 88'

Estadio Cuscatlán, San Salvador
Attendance: 36,000
Referee: Carlos Batres (Guatemala)
16 July 2000

Saint Vincent and the Grenadines	0–1	Jamaica
	Report	Lowe 23'

Arnos Vale Stadium, Kingstown
Attendance: 5,000
Referee: Noel Bynoe (Trinidad and Tobago)

23 July 2000

El Salvador	7–1	Saint Vincent and the Grenadines
Montes 19'; Castro 34'; Rivera 49', 60'; Arce 63', 83', 85'	Report	Ballantyne 9'

Estadio Cuscatlán, San Salvador
Attendance: 25,000
Referee: Felipe De Jesús Ramos (Mexico)
23 July 2000

Jamaica	3–1	Honduras
Whitmore 27'; Lowe 69'; Burton 77'	Report	Ramírez 2'

Independence Park, Kingston
Attendance: 23,000
Referee: Timothy Weyland (United States)

16 August 2000

Jamaica	1–0	El Salvador
Lowe 34'	Report

Independence Park, Kingston
Attendance: 20,000
Referee: Edgar Rangel Pérez (Mexico)
16 August 2000

Honduras	6–0	Saint Vincent and the Grenadines
Pavón 5', 86'; Ramírez 19', 59'; Guevara 27'; Bengoché 88'	Report

Estadio Tiburcio Carías Andino, Tegucigalpa
Attendance: 30,000
Referee: José Farías Martínez (Canada)

2 September 2000

Honduras	5–0	El Salvador
Pavón 20', 43', 58'; Suazo 47'; Caballero 84'	Report

Estadio Olímpico Metropolitano, San Pedro Sula
Attendance: 42,000
Referee: Fredy Burgos (Guatemala)
3 September 2000

Jamaica	2–0	Saint Vincent and the Grenadines
Williams 45'; Lowe 50'	Report

Independence Park, Kingston
Attendance: 30,000
Referee: Ramesh Ramdhan (Trinidad and Tobago)

8 October 2000

Honduras	1–0	Jamaica
Turcios 90'	Report

Estadio Tiburcio Carías Andino, Tegucigalpa
Attendance: 35,000
Referee: Ricardo Valenzuela (United States)
8 October 2000

Saint Vincent and the Grenadines	1–2	El Salvador
James 79'	Report	Velasquez 3'; Cubías 89'

Arnos Vale Stadium, Kingstown
Attendance: 1,500
Referee: Urvin Faneyte (Netherlands Antilles)

14 November 2000

Saint Vincent and the Grenadines	0–7	Honduras
	Report	Ramírez 26', 31'; Velásquez 46'; C. Santamaría 52'; L. Santamaría 77'; Caballero 85'; Bengoché 89'

Arnos Vale Stadium, Kingstown
Attendance: 1,800
Referee: Noel Egan (Antigua and Barbuda)
15 November 2000

El Salvador	2–0	Jamaica
Padilla 17'; Rodríguez 24' (pen.)	Report

Estadio Nacional Flor Blanca, San Salvador
Attendance: 3,000
Referee: Ali Saheli (United States)

== Group 3 ==
Pos	Team	Pld	W	D	L	GF	GA	GD	Pts	Qualification	United States men's national soccer team	Costa Rica national football team	Guatemala national football team	Barbados national football team
1	United States	6	3	2	1	14	3	+11	11	Advance to the final round	—	0–0	1–0	7–0
2	Costa Rica	6	3	1	2	9	6	+3	10 (Note: As Costa Rica and Guatemala finished level on points, goal differential, goals scored and head-to-head record, a play-off on neutral ground was played to determine second place. Costa Rica won the play-off 5–2 to finish second.)	Advance to the final round	2–1	—	2–1	3–0
3	Guatemala	6	3	1	2	9	6	+3	10		1–1	2–1	—	2–0
4	Barbados	6	1	0	5	3	20	−17	3		0–4	2–1	1–3	—

Notes:
16 July 2000

Guatemala	1–1	United States
Ruiz 88'	Report	Razov 45+1'

Estadio Carlos Salazar Hijo, Mazatenango
Attendance: 10,000
Referee: Armando Archundia (Mexico)
16 July 2000

Barbados	2–1	Costa Rica
Riley 49'; Forde 89'	Report	Madrigal 48'

Barbados National Stadium, Bridgetown
Attendance: 7,000
Referee: Mauricio Navarro (Canada)

22 July 2000

Guatemala	2–0	Barbados
Ruiz 2'; García 83'	Report

Estadio Mario Camposeco, Quetzaltenango
Attendance: 4,000
Referee: Mike Seiffert (Canada)
23 July 2000

Costa Rica	2–1	United States
Fonseca 10'; Medford 90+3' (pen.)	Report	Stewart 65'

Estadio Ricardo Saprissa, San José
Attendance: 20,000
Referee: Peter Prendergast (Jamaica)

15 August 2000

Costa Rica	2–1	Guatemala
Wanchope 34', 58'	Report	Pezzarossi 68'

Estadio Alejandro Morera Soto, Alajuela
Attendance: 18,000
Referee: Argelio Sabillon (Honduras)
16 August 2000

United States	7–0	Barbados
Pope 14'; McBride 28'; Moore 45', 82'; O'Brien 46'; Ramos 72'; Stewart 74'	Report

Foxboro Stadium, Foxborough
Attendance: 18,334
Referee: Jose Pineda Fernandez (Honduras)

3 September 2000

Costa Rica	3–0	Barbados
Soto 35'; Fonseca 40'; Medford 54'	Report

Estadio Ricardo Saprissa, San José
Attendance: 17,000
Referee: Eduardo Brizio (Mexico)
3 September 2000

United States	1–0	Guatemala
McBride 72'	Report

Robert F. Kennedy Memorial Stadium, Washington, D.C.
Attendance: 51,996
Referee: Edgar Rangel (Mexico)

8 October 2000

Barbados	1–3	Guatemala
Riley 24'	Report	García 3'; Ruiz 10'; Acevedo 84'

Barbados National Stadium, Bridgetown
Attendance: 3,800
Referee: Felipe Ramos Rizo (Mexico)
11 October 2000

United States	0–0	Costa Rica
	Report

Columbus Crew Stadium, Columbus
Attendance: 24,430
Referee: Ramesh Ramdhan (Trinidad and Tobago)

15 November 2000

Guatemala	2–1	Costa Rica
Ruiz 53', 87'	Report	Fonseca 71'

Estadio Carlos Salazar Hijo, Mazatenango
Attendance: 12,000
Referee: Felipe Ramos Rizo (Mexico)
15 November 2000

Barbados	0–4	United States
	Report	Mathis 63'; Stewart 73'; Jones 77'; Razov 90+2'

Barbados National Stadium, Bridgetown
Attendance: 4,000
Referee: Ramesh Ramdhan (Trinidad and Tobago)

=== Play-off ===
6 January 2001

Costa Rica	5–2	Guatemala
Wanchope 7'; Fonseca 43', 59'; Parks 58'; Soto 87'	Report	Ruiz 4', 89' (pen.)

Miami Orange Bowl, Miami
Attendance: 41,000
Referee: Rodolfo Alexander Sibrian (El Salvador)

== Goalscorers ==
There were 122 goals scored in 37 matches, for an average of 3.3 goals per match.

7 goals

- (Guatemala national football team) Carlos Ruiz
- (Honduras national football team) Carlos Pavón

5 goals

- (Costa Rica national football team) Rolando Fonseca
- (Honduras national football team) Francisco Ramírez

4 goals

- (Jamaica national football team) Onandi Lowe
- (Mexico national football team) Cuauhtémoc Blanco

3 goals

- (Costa Rica national football team) Paulo Wanchope
- (El Salvador national football team) Raúl Díaz Arce
- (Honduras national football team) Samuel Caballero
- (Mexico national football team) Jared Borgetti
- (Trinidad and Tobago national football team) Angus Eve
- (Trinidad and Tobago national football team) Dwight Yorke
- (United States men's national soccer team) Earnie Stewart

2 goals

- (Barbados national football team) Llewellyn Riley
- (Costa Rica national football team) Hernán Medford
- (Costa Rica national football team) Jafet Soto
- (El Salvador national football team) Elías Montes
- (El Salvador national football team) Guillermo Rivera
- (Guatemala national football team) Freddy García
- (Honduras national football team) Renán Bengoché
- (Honduras national football team) David Suazo
- (Honduras national football team) Danilo Turcios
- (Mexico national football team) José Manuel Abundis
- (Mexico national football team) Víctor Ruiz
- (Mexico national football team) Miguel Zepeda
- (Trinidad and Tobago national football team) Russell Latapy
- (Trinidad and Tobago national football team) Nigel Pierre
- (United States men's national soccer team) Brian McBride
- (United States men's national soccer team) Joe-Max Moore
- (United States men's national soccer team) Ante Razov

1 goal

- (Barbados national football team) Michael Forde
- (Canada men's national soccer team) Jim Brennan
- (Costa Rica national football team) Alejandro Madrigal
- (Costa Rica national football team) Reynaldo Parks
- (El Salvador national football team) Carlos Castro Borja
- (El Salvador national football team) Mauricio Cienfuegos
- (El Salvador national football team) Jaime Vladimir Cubías
- (El Salvador national football team) Juan Carlos Padilla
- (El Salvador national football team) Jorge Rodríguez
- (El Salvador national football team) Daniel Velasquez
- (Guatemala national football team) Mario Acevedo
- (Guatemala national football team) Dwight Pezzarossi
- (Honduras national football team) Amado Guevara
- (Honduras national football team) Christian Santamaría
- (Honduras national football team) Luis Santamaría
- (Honduras national football team) Wilmer Velásquez
- (Jamaica national football team) Deon Burton
- (Jamaica national football team) Theodore Whitmore
- (Jamaica national football team) Andy Williams
- (Mexico national football team) Duilio Davino
- (Mexico national football team) Rafael Márquez
- (Mexico national football team) Ramón Ramírez
- (Panama national football team) Jorge Dely Valdés
- (Saint Vincent and the Grenadines national football team) Jamal Ballantyne
- (Saint Vincent and the Grenadines national football team) Marlon James
- (Trinidad and Tobago national football team) Reynold Carrington
- (Trinidad and Tobago national football team) Stokely Mason
- (Trinidad and Tobago national football team) Anthony Rougier
- (United States men's national soccer team) Cobi Jones
- (United States men's national soccer team) Clint Mathis
- (United States men's national soccer team) John O'Brien
- (United States men's national soccer team) Eddie Pope
- (United States men's national soccer team) Tab Ramos

1 own goal

- (Canada men's national soccer team) Paul Fenwick (against Mexico)
- (Panama national football team) Jorge Dely Valdés (against Trinidad and Tobago)
