= 2001 in American soccer =

Soccer in the United States
- Season: 2001

The 2001 season was the 89th year of competitive soccer in the United States.

== National team ==
=== Record ===
Competition	GP	W	D	L	GF	GA
2002 FIFA World Cup qualification	10	5	2	3	11	8
International Friendly	5	1	1	3	3	4
Total	15	6	3	6	14	12

=== Results ===
The home team or the team that is designated as the home team is listed in the left column; the away team is in the right column.

Win Draw Loss

January 27 International Friendly	United States	2–1	China	Oakland, California
14:30 UTC-08	McBride 27'; Wang 46' (o.g.)	(Report)	Qu 75'	Stadium: Network Associates Coliseum; Attendance: 8.903; Referee: Mike Seifert (Canada)

February 3 International Friendly	United States	0–1	Colombia	Miami, Florida
16:00 UTC-05		(Report)	Grisales 53'	Stadium: Orange Bowl; Attendance: 14,169; Referee: Rodolfo Sibrían (El Salvador)

February 28 World Cup qualifying	United States	2–0	Mexico	Columbus, Ohio
19:30 UTC-05	Wolff 47'; Stewart 87'	(Report)		Stadium: Columbus Crew Stadium; Attendance: 24,624

March 3 International Friendly	United States	1–2	Brazil	Pasadena, California
13:00 UTC-08	Mathis 40'	(Report)	Ronaldinho 25'; Euller 56'	Stadium: Rose Bowl; Attendance: 45,387

March 28 World Cup qualifying	Honduras	1–2	United States	San Pedro Sula, Honduras
19:30 UTC-06	de León 59'	(Report)	Stewart 33'; Mathis 87'	Stadium: Estadio Olímpico; Attendance: 46,00

April 25 World Cup qualifying	United States	1–0	Costa Rica	Kansas City, Missouri
18:30 UTC-05	Wolff 70'	(Report)		Stadium: Arrowhead Stadium; Attendance: 37,319

June 7 International Friendly	United States	0–0	Ecuador	Columbus, Ohio
20:00 UTC-04		(Report)		Stadium: Columbus Crew Stadium; Attendance: 12,572; Referee: Jose Farias (Canada)

June 16 World Cup qualifying	Jamaica	0–0	United States	Kingston, Jamaica
13:00 UTC-05		(Report)		Stadium: National Stadium; Attendance: 35,000; Referee: Ubaldo Aquino (Paraguay)

June 20 World Cup qualifying	United States	2–0	Trinidad and Tobago	Foxborough, Massachusetts
19:30 UTC-04	Razov 2'; Stewart 20'	(Report)		Stadium: Foxboro Stadium; Attendance: 31,211; Referee: Ali Bujsaim (United Arab Emirates)

July 1 World Cup qualifying	Mexico	1–0	United States	Mexico City, Mexico
12:00 UTC-05	Borgetti 16'	(Report)		Stadium: Estadio Azteca; Attendance: 95,000; Referee: Kim Young-Joo (South Korea)

September 1 World Cup qualifying	United States	2–3	Honduras	Washington, D.C.
10:00 UTC-04	Stewart 7', 84'	(Report)	Núñez 28', 77'; Pavón 53' (pen.)	Stadium: RFK Stadium; Attendance: 54,282; Referee: Mauricio Navarro (Canada)

September 5 World Cup qualifying	Costa Rica	2–0	United States	San José, Costa Rica
20:00 UTC-06	Fonseca 40' (pen.), 68'	(Report)		Stadium: Estadio Ricardo Saprissa; Attendance: 30,000; Referee: Carlos Batres (Guatemala)

October 7 World Cup qualifying	United States	2–1	Jamaica	Foxborough, Massachusetts
14:00 UTC-04	Moore 4', 81' (pen.)	(Report)	Lawrence 14'	Stadium: Foxboro Stadium; Attendance: 40,483; Referee: Rodolfo Sibrian (El Salvador)

November 11 World Cup qualifying	Trinidad and Tobago	0–0	United States	Port of Spain, Trinidad and Tobago
15:00 UTC-04		(Report)		Stadium: Hasely Crawford Stadium; Referee: Peter Prendergast (Jamaica)

December 9 International Friendly	South Korea	1–0	United States	Jeju City, South Korea
	Yoo 23'	(Report)		Stadium: Jeju Stadium; Attendance: 42,256; Referee: Naotsugu Fuse (Japan)

=== Goalscorers ===
Player	Goals
Earnie Stewart	5
Josh Wolff	3
Joe-Max Moore	2
Brian McBride	1
Clint Mathis	1
Ante Razov	1

== Major League Soccer ==
=== Standings ===
Eastern Conference	GP*	W	L	D	GF	GA	GD	Pts
s – Miami Fusion F.C.	26	16	5	5	57	36	21	53
x – MetroStars	26	13	10	3	38	35	3	42
New England Revolution	27	7	14	6	35	52	−17	27
D.C. United	26	8	16	2	42	50	−8	26

Central Conference	GP*	W	L	D	GF	GA	GD	Pts
x – Chicago Fire	27	16	6	5	50	30	20	53
x – Columbus Crew	26	13	7	6	49	36	13	45
x – Dallas Burn	26	10	11	5	48	47	1	35
Tampa Bay Mutiny	27	4	21	2	32	68	−36	14

Western Conference	GP*	W	L	D	GF	GA	GD	Pts
x – Los Angeles Galaxy	26	14	7	5	52	36	16	47
x – San Jose Earthquakes	26	13	7	6	47	29	18	45
x – Kansas City Wizards	27	11	13	3	33	53	−20	36
Colorado Rapids	26	5	13	8	36	47	−11	23

- Top eight teams with the highest points clinch play-off berth, regardless of conference.
  s =

Supporters Shield
x = Clinched playoff berth

- Miami Fusion F.C. wins first tiebreaker with Chicago Fire (2–0 in head-to-head competition)
- Columbus Crew wins first tiebreaker with San Jose Earthquakes (1–0–1 in head-to-head competition)
- GP* (Games Played) = Season shorten due to 9/11 attacks.

=== Playoffs ===
Playoff bracket

Quarterfinals
2	Chicago Fire (7 Points)	2	1	2
7	Dallas Burn (1 Points)	0	1	0
3	Los Angeles Galaxy (SDET)* (4 Points)	1	1	3*
6	MetroStars (4 Points)	1	4	2
1	Miami Fusion F.C. (6 Points)	2	0	2
8	Kansas City Wizards (3 Points)	0	3	1
4	Columbus Crew (0 Points)	1	0	x
5	San Jose Earthquakes (6 Points)	3	3	x

Semifinals
Chicago Fire (1 Points)	1	0	1
Los Angeles Galaxy (ASDET)* (7 Points)	1	1*	2*
Miami Fusion F.C. (3 Points)	1	0	0
San Jose Earthquakes (SDET)* (6 Points)	0	4	1*

MLS Cup 2001
Los Angeles Galaxy	1
San Jose Earthquakes (ASDET)*	2*

- Points system
  Win = 3 Pts.
  Loss = 0 Pts.
  Draw = 1 Pt.
- ASDET*=Added Sudden Death Extra Time (Game tie breaker)
  SDET**=Sudden Death Extra Time

(Series tie breaker)
Teams will advance at 5 points.

=== MLS Cup ===
October 21

Los Angeles Galaxy	1–2 (a.e.t.)	San Jose Earthquakes
Hernández 21'		Donovan 43'; De Rosario 96'

Columbus Crew Stadium, Columbus, Ohio
Attendance: 21,626
Referee: Paul Tamberino

== Lamar Hunt U.S. Open Cup ==
=== Bracket ===
Home teams listed on top of bracket

Second round
A-L	Milwaukee Rampage	2
D3	Utah Blitzz	0
PDL	Central Coast Roadrunners	0
MLS	San Jose Earthquakes	6
MLS	Los Angeles Galaxy	5
A-L	Nashville Metros	0
MLS	Dallas Burn	2
PDL	Sounders Select (ASDET)	3
MLS	Kansas City Wizards	4
A-L	Seattle Sounders	0
MLS	Chicago Fire	3
A-L	San Diego Flash	0
A-L	El Paso Patriots	4
D3	Chico Rooks	3
A-L	Pittsburgh Riverhounds	2
MLS	Colorado Rapids	0
MLS	New England Revolution	7
PDL	Mid Michigan Bucks	1
A-L	Charleston Battery	4
MLS	MetroStars	1
MLS	Columbus Crew	5
A-L	Carolina Dynamo	1
MLS	Miami Fusion	4
USASA	Uruguay SC	0
MLS	D.C. United	8
D3	New Jersey Stallions	0
A-L	Rochester Rhinos	0
A-L	Hershey Wildcats	1
A-L	Richmond Kickers	7
D3	Reading Rage	2
A-L	Connecticut Wolves	3
MLS	Tampa Bay Mutiny	2

Third round
A-L	Milwaukee Rampage	0 (6)
MLS	San Jose Earthquakes (ASDET, PSO)	0 (7)
MLS	Los Angeles Galaxy	3
PDL	Sounders Select	1
MLS	Kansas City Wizards	0
MLS	Chicago Fire	1
A-L	El Paso Patriots	1
A-L	Pittsburgh Riverhounds	2
MLS	New England Revolution	2
A-L	Charleston Battery	1
MLS	Columbus Crew	2
MLS	Miami Fusion	1
MLS	D.C. United	3
A-L	Hershey Wildcats	0
A-L	Richmond Kickers	2
A-L	Connecticut Wolves	1

Quarterfinals
MLS	San Jose Earthquakes	1 (9)
MLS	Los Angeles Galaxy (ASDET, PSO)	1 (10)
MLS	Chicago Fire (ASDET)	3
A-L	Pittsburgh Riverhounds	2
MLS	New England Revolution	2
MLS	Columbus Crew	1
MLS	D.C. United	2
A-L	Richmond Kickers	1

Semifinals
MLS	Los Angeles Galaxy (ASDET)	1
MLS	Chicago Fire	0
MLS	New England Revolution	2
MLS	D.C. United	0

Finals
MLS	Los Angeles Galaxy (ASDET)	2
MLS	New England Revolution	1

=== Final ===
October 27

New England Revolution	1 – 2 (asdet)	Los Angeles Galaxy
Harris 30'		Hendrickson 70'; Califf 92'

Titan Stadium, Fullerton, California
Attendance: 4,195
Referee: Paul Tamberino

== American clubs in international competitions ==
Club	Competition	Final round
D.C. United	CONCACAF Giants Cup	Final
D.C. United	2000 CONCACAF Champions' Cup	Third Place Match
Los Angeles Galaxy	2000 CONCACAF Champions' Cup	Final
Columbus Crew	CONCACAF Giants Cup	Quarterfinals

=== D.C. United ===
January 17 Champions' Cup Quarterfinal	D.C. United (United States)	2–1	(Costa Rica) Alajuelense	Fullerton, California
	Etcheverry 15'; Olsen 90'		Arnáez 71' (pen.)	Stadium: Titan Stadium

January 19 Champions' Cup Semifinal	Los Angeles Galaxy (United States)	1–1 (a.e.t.) (4–2 p)	(United States) D.C. United	Los Angeles, California
	Vanney 29' (pen.)		Etcheverry 48' (pen.)	Stadium: Los Angeles Memorial Coliseum
	Penalties
	Vanney (penalty scored); Elliott (penalty scored); Vagenas (penalty scored); Cienfuegos (penalty scored)		Talley (penalty scored); Agoos (penalty scored); Etcheverry (penalty missed); Olsen (penalty missed)

January 21 Third Place Match	D.C. United (United States)	1–2	(Mexico) Pachuca	Los Angeles, California
	Pineda 14'; Arellano 38'		Talley 33'	Stadium: Rose Bowl

April 4 Giants Cup Quarterfinals	Arnett Gardens (Jamaica)	0–3	(United States) D.C. United	Kingston, Jamaica
			Arce 39', 66' (pen.); Talley 59'	Stadium: Tony Spaulding Sports Complex

April 11 Giants Cup Quarterfinals	D.C. United (United States)	2–1	(Jamaica) Arnett Gardens	Washington, D.C.
	Talley 30', pen.' Lisi 86'		Earle 23'	Stadium: RFK Stadium; Attendance: 9,117

August 3 Giants Cup Semifinal	D.C. United (United States)	2–1	(Guatemala) Comunicaciones	Los Angeles, California
	Moreno 26'; Lisi 89'		Rivera 22'	Stadium: Los Angeles Coliseum; Attendance: 4,533

August 5 Giants Cup Final	D.C. United (United States)	0–2	(Mexico) América	Los Angeles, California
			Mendoza 52'; Valdez 70'	Stadium: Los Angeles Coliseum; Attendance: 3,127

=== Los Angeles Galaxy ===
January 17 Champions' Cup Quarterfinal	Los Angeles Galaxy (United States)	0–0 (a.e.t.) (5–3 p)	(Honduras) Real España	Fullerton, California
				Stadium: Titan Stadium
	Penalties
	Vanney (penalty scored); Elliott (penalty scored); Vagenas (penalty scored); Cienfuegos (penalty scored); Victorine (penalty scored)		Gutierrez (penalty missed); Caprile (penalty scored); López (penalty scored); Garcia (penalty scored)

January 19 Champions' Cup Semifinal	Los Angeles Galaxy (United States)	1–1 (a.e.t.) (4–2 p)	(United States) D.C. United	Los Angeles, California
	Vanney 29' (pen.)		Etcheverry 48' (pen.)	Stadium: Los Angeles Memorial Coliseum
	Penalties
	Vanney (penalty scored); Elliott (penalty scored); Vagenas (penalty scored); Cienfuegos (penalty scored)		Talley (penalty scored); Agoos (penalty scored); Etcheverry (penalty missed); Olsen (penalty missed)

January 21 Champions' Cup Final	Los Angeles Galaxy (United States)	3–2	(Honduras) Olimpia	Los Angeles, California
	Hendrickson 36', 78'; Jones 39'		Tosello 34' (pen.) de Lima 51'	Stadium: Rose Bowl

=== Columbus Crew ===
April 4 Giants Cup Quarterfinals	Saprissa (Costa Rica)	2–0	(United States) Columbus Crew	San José, Costa Rica
	Centeno 68'; Lapper 90' (o.g.)			Stadium: Estadio Ricardo Saprissa

April 11 Giants Cup Quarterfinals	Columbus Crew (United States)	1–1	(Costa Rica) Saprissa	Columbus, Ohio
	Maisonneuve 45'		Robinson 16'	Stadium: Columbus Crew Stadium
