= 2002 FIFA World Cup qualification – CONCACAF final round =

International football competition

The CONCACAF final round of the CONCACAF zone of the 2002 FIFA World Cup qualification, was contested between the six remaining teams of the qualification process. The teams were placed into a single group, with matches played against each other on a home-and-away basis. The top three teams would qualify for the 2002 FIFA World Cup. Costa Rica topped the group with 23 points, and finished with the best record of any CONCACAF team in the history of the hexagonal.

== Standings ==
Pos	Team	Pld	W	D	L	GF	GA	GD	Pts	Qualification	Costa Rica	Mexico	United States	Honduras	Jamaica	Trinidad and Tobago
1	Costa Rica	10	7	2	1	17	7	+10	23	Qualified to the 2002 FIFA World Cup	—	0–0	2–0	2–2	2–1	3–0
2	Mexico	10	5	2	3	16	9	+7	17	Qualified to the 2002 FIFA World Cup	1–2	—	1–0	3–0	4–0	3–0
3	United States	10	5	2	3	11	8	+3	17	Qualified to the 2002 FIFA World Cup	1–0	2–0	—	2–3	2–1	2–0
4	Honduras	10	4	2	4	17	17	0	14		2–3	3–1	1–2	—	1–0	0–1
5	Jamaica	10	2	2	6	7	14	−7	8		0–1	1–2	0–0	1–1	—	1–0
6	Trinidad and Tobago	10	1	2	7	5	18	−13	5		0–2	1–1	0–0	2–4	1–2	—

Source: FIFA

== Matches ==
=== Matchday 1 ===
February 28, 2001
13:00 UTC−5

Jamaica	1–0	Trinidad and Tobago
Marshall 16'	Report

Independence Park
Kingston, Jamaica
Attendance: 34,000
Referee: Carlos Batres (Guatemala)

February 28, 2001
19:30 UTC−5

United States	2–0	Mexico
Wolff 47'; Stewart 87'	Report

Columbus Crew Stadium
Columbus, Ohio, United States
Attendance: 24,329
Referee: Rodolfo Sibrian (El Salvador)

February 28, 2001
20:00 UTC−6

Costa Rica	2–2	Honduras
Fonseca 70'; Cordero 90+4'	Report	Pineda 3'; Núñez 85'

Estadio Ricardo Saprissa
San José, Costa Rica
Attendance: 20,000
Referee: Ali Bujsaim (United Arab Emirates)

=== Matchday 2 ===
March 25, 2001

Mexico	4–0	Jamaica
De Nigris 15', 18'; Borgetti 84', 88'	Report

Estadio Azteca
Mexico City, Mexico
Attendance: 80,000
Referee: Mauricio Navarro (Canada)

March 25, 2001

Costa Rica	3–0	Trinidad and Tobago
Bryce 46'; Wanchope 81', 88'	Report

Estadio Alejandro Morera Soto
Alajuela, Costa Rica
Attendance: 17,500
Referee: Kim Young-Joo (South Korea)

March 28, 2001

Honduras	1–2	United States
De León 59'	Report	Stewart 33'; Mathis 87'

Estadio Olímpico Metropolitano
San Pedro Sula, Honduras
Attendance: 46,000
Referee: Freddy Burgos (Guatemala)

=== Matchday 3 ===
April 25, 2001

Jamaica	1–1	Honduras
Gardner 56'	Report	Caballero 80'

Independence Park
Kingston, Jamaica
Attendance: 30,000
Referee: Carlos Simon (Brazil)

April 25, 2001

Trinidad and Tobago	1–1	Mexico
Andrews 14'	Report	Pardo 61'

Queen's Park Oval
Port of Spain, Trinidad and Tobago
Attendance: 8,000
Referee: Saad Mane (Kuwait)

April 25, 2001

United States	1–0	Costa Rica
Wolff 70'	Report

Arrowhead Stadium
Kansas City, Missouri, United States
Attendance: 37,319
Referee: Jorge Larrionda (Uruguay)

=== Matchday 4 ===
June 16, 2001

Mexico	1–2	Costa Rica
Abundis 7'	Report	Fonseca 73'; Medford 87'

Estadio Azteca
Mexico City, Mexico
Attendance: 60,000
Referee: Carlos Batres (Guatemala)

June 16, 2001

Jamaica	0–0	United States
	Report

Independence Park
Kingston, Jamaica
Attendance: 35,000
Referee: Ubaldo Aquino (Paraguay)

June 16, 2001

Trinidad and Tobago	2–4	Honduras
Latapy 56'; John 90'	Report	Pavón 13' (pen.); Turcios 20'; Morales 54'; Guevara 86' (pen.)

Hasely Crawford Stadium
Port of Spain, Trinidad and Tobago
Attendance: 5,500
Referee: Mauricio Navarro (Canada)

=== Matchday 5 ===
June 20, 2001

United States	2–0	Trinidad and Tobago
Razov 2'; Stewart 20'	Report

Foxboro Stadium
Foxborough, United States
Attendance: 31,211
Referee: Ali Bujsaim (United Arab Emirates)

June 20, 2001

Honduras	3–1	Mexico
Pavón 16', 55', 64' (pen.)	Report	Ruiz 86'

Estadio Olímpico Metropolitano
San Pedro Sula, Honduras
Attendance: 50,000
Referee: Horacio Elizondo (Argentina)

June 20, 2001

Costa Rica	2–1	Jamaica
Marin 4'; Wanchope 38'	Report	Lowe 10'

Estadio Alejandro Morera Soto
Alajuela, Costa Rica
Attendance: 17,800
Referee: John Toro Rendon (Colombia)

=== Matchday 6 ===
June 30, 2001

Trinidad and Tobago	1–2	Jamaica
John 26'	Report	Lowe 30'; Burton 68'

Queen's Park Oval
Port of Spain, Trinidad and Tobago
Attendance: 4,000
Referee: Gustavo Mendez (Uruguay)

July 1, 2001

Mexico	1–0	United States
Borgetti 16'	Report

Estadio Azteca
Mexico City, Mexico
Attendance: 110,000
Referee: Kim Young-Joo (South Korea)

July 1, 2001

Honduras	2–3	Costa Rica
Guevara 25', 38'	Report	Wanchope 9'; Fonseca 13'; Solís 83'

Estadio Nacional
Tegucigalpa, Honduras
Attendance: 38,000
Referee: Oscar Ruiz (Colombia)

=== Matchday 7 ===
September 1, 2001

United States	2–3	Honduras
Stewart 7', 84'	Report	Núñez 27', 77'; Pavón 53' (pen.)

RFK Stadium
Washington, D.C., U.S.
Attendance: 54,282
Referee: Mauricio Navarro (Canada)

September 1, 2001

Trinidad and Tobago	0–2	Costa Rica
	Report	Gómez 4', 35'

Hasely Crawford Stadium
Port of Spain, Trinidad and Tobago
Attendance: 2,500
Referee: Mohammed Kousa (Syria)

September 2, 2001

Jamaica	1–2	Mexico
Morales 11' (o.g.)	Report	Blanco 68', 76'

Independence Park
Kingston, Jamaica
Attendance: 35,000
Referee: Gamal Ghandour (Egypt)

=== Matchday 8 ===
September 5, 2001

Mexico	3–0	Trinidad and Tobago
García Aspe 25' (pen.); Arellano 44'; Blanco 86' (pen.)	Report

Estadio Azteca
Mexico City, Mexico
Attendance: 75,000
Referee: Jose Farias Martinez (Canada)

September 5, 2001

Honduras	1–0	Jamaica
Núñez 53'	Report

Estadio Nacional
Tegucigalpa, Honduras
Attendance: 22,000
Referee: Qasem Shaban (Kuwait)

September 5, 2001

Costa Rica	2–0	United States
Fonseca 40' (pen.), 68'	Report

Estadio Ricardo Saprissa
San José, Costa Rica
Attendance: 24,000
Referee: Carlos Batres (Guatemala)

=== Matchday 9 ===
October 7, 2001

Costa Rica	0–0	Mexico
	Report

Estadio Ricardo Saprissa
San José, Costa Rica
Attendance: 24,000
Referee: Antonio Pereira da Silva (Brazil)

October 7, 2001

Honduras	0–1	Trinidad and Tobago
	Report	John 61'

Estadio Olímpico Metropolitano
San Pedro Sula, Honduras
Attendance: 45,000
Referee: Mike Seifert (Canada)

October 7, 2001

United States	2–1	Jamaica
Moore 4', 81' (pen.)	Report	Lawrence 14'

Foxboro Stadium
Foxborough, U.S.
Attendance: 40,483
Referee: Rodolfo Sibrian (El Salvador)

=== Matchday 10 ===
November 11, 2001

Mexico	3–0	Honduras
Blanco 65', 78' (pen.); Palencia 72'	Report

Estadio Azteca
Mexico City, Mexico
Attendance: 105,405
Referee: Carlos Batres (Guatemala)

November 11, 2001

Trinidad and Tobago	0–0	United States
	Report

Hasely Crawford Stadium
Port of Spain, Trinidad and Tobago
Attendance: 5,000
Referee: Peter Prendergast (Jamaica)

November 11, 2001

Jamaica	0–1	Costa Rica
	Report	Sunsing 5'

Independence Park
Kingston, Jamaica
Attendance: 7,000
Referee: Ramesh Ramdhan (Trinidad and Tobago)

== Goalscorers ==
There were 73 goals scored in 30 matches, for an average of 2.43 goals per match.

5 goals

- (Costa Rica) Rolando Fonseca
- (Honduras) Carlos Pavón
- (Mexico) Cuauhtémoc Blanco
- (United States) Earnie Stewart

4 goals

- (Costa Rica) Paulo Wanchope
- (Honduras) Milton Núñez

3 goals

- (Honduras) Amado Guevara
- (Mexico) Jared Borgetti
- (Trinidad and Tobago) Stern John

2 goals

- (Costa Rica) Rónald Gómez
- (Jamaica) Onandi Lowe
- (Mexico) Antonio de Nigris
- (United States) Joe-Max Moore
- (United States) Josh Wolff

1 goal

- (Costa Rica) Steven Bryce
- (Costa Rica) Rodrigo Cordero
- (Costa Rica) Luis Marín Murillo
- (Costa Rica) Hernán Medford
- (Costa Rica) Mauricio Solís
- (Costa Rica) William Sunsing
- (Honduras) Samuel Caballero
- (Honduras) Julio César de León
- (Honduras) Rony Morales
- (Honduras) José Luis Pineda
- (Honduras) Danilo Turcios
- (Jamaica) Deon Burton
- (Jamaica) Ricardo Gardner
- (Jamaica) Jamie Lawrence
- (Jamaica) Tyrone Marshall
- (Mexico) José Manuel Abundis
- (Mexico) Jesus Arellano
- (Mexico) Alberto García Aspe
- (Mexico) Francisco Palencia
- (Mexico) Pável Pardo
- (Mexico) Víctor Ruiz
- (Trinidad and Tobago) Marvin Andrews
- (Trinidad and Tobago) Russell Latapy
- (United States) Clint Mathis
- (United States) Ante Razov

1 own goal

- (Mexico) Heriberto Morales (against Jamaica)
