= 2002 FIFA World Cup qualification – CONCACAF Central American Zone =

2002 FIFA World Cup qualification - CONCACAF Central American Zone

The CONCACAF Central American Zone of the CONCACAF zone of the 2002 FIFA World Cup qualification was contested between six teams from the Central America zone. The teams were divided into two groups of three teams each. The teams played against each other on a home-and-away basis. The group winners advanced to the semi-final round. The runners-up advanced to the play-offs.

== Group A ==
| Pos | Team | Pld | W | D | L | GF | GA | GD | Pts | Qualification | (El Salvador) | (Guatemala) | (Belize) |
|---|---|---|---|---|---|---|---|---|---|---|---|---|---|
| 1 | El Salvador | 4 | 3 | 1 | 0 | 10 | 2 | +8 | 10 | Qualify for the semi-finals | — | 1–1 | 5–0 |
| 2 | Guatemala | 4 | 1 | 2 | 1 | 3 | 3 | 0 | 5 | Advance to the play-offs | 0–1 | — | 0–0 |
| 3 | Belize | 4 | 0 | 1 | 3 | 2 | 10 | −8 | 1 | | 1–3 | 1–2 | — |

March 5, 2000

| El Salvador | 5–0 | Belize |
|---|---|---|
| R. Martínez 14'; Rodríguez 31'; Arce 69'; Cerritos 79'; Torres 81' | Report |

Estadio Nacional Flor Blanca, San Salvador
Attendance: 14,567
Referee: Nelson Calix (Honduras)

March 19, 2000

| Belize | 1–2 | Guatemala |
|---|---|---|
| Núñez 40' | Report | García 33'; Ramírez 76' |

Estadio Francisco Morazán, San Pedro Sula
Attendance: 2,500
Referee: Rafael Pedroza (Panama)

April 2, 2000

| Guatemala | 0–1 | El Salvador |
|---|---|---|
| | Report | Arce 50' |

Estadio Mateo Flores, Guatemala City
Attendance: 30,000
Referee: Antonio Marrufo (Mexico)

April 16, 2000

| Belize | 1–3 | El Salvador |
|---|---|---|
| Burgess 65' | Report | Arce 6'; E. Martínez 51'; Rodríguez 64' |

People's Stadium, Orange Walk Town
Attendance: 4,000
Referee: Roger Miranda (Nicaragua)

May 7, 2000

| El Salvador | 1–1 | Guatemala |
|---|---|---|
| Arce 45' | Report | Plata 20' |

Estadio Cuscatlán, San Salvador
Attendance: 40,000
Referee: Rodrigo Badilla (Costa Rica)

May 19, 2000

| Guatemala | 0–0 | Belize |
|---|---|---|
| | Report |

Estadio Francisco Morazán, San Pedro Sula
Attendance: 3,500
Referee: José Pineda (Honduras)
- The matches between Belize and Guatemala were played on neutral ground due to a border dispute.

== Group B ==
| Pos | Team | Pld | W | D | L | GF | GA | GD | Pts | Qualification | Panama national football team | Honduras national football team | Nicaragua national football team |
|---|---|---|---|---|---|---|---|---|---|---|---|---|---|
| 1 | Panama | 4 | 3 | 0 | 1 | 8 | 3 | +5 | 9 | Qualify for the semi-finals | — | 1–0 | 4–0 |
| 2 | Honduras | 4 | 3 | 0 | 1 | 7 | 2 | +5 | 9 | Advance to the play-offs | 3–1 | — | 3–0 |
| 3 | Nicaragua | 4 | 0 | 0 | 4 | 0 | 10 | −10 | 0 | | 0–2 | 0–1 | — |

March 4, 2000

| Honduras | 3–0 | Nicaragua |
|---|---|---|
| Chacon 29'; Guerrero 41'; Núñez 70' | Report |

Estadio Olímpico Metropolitano, San Pedro Sula
Attendance: 18,000
Referee: Ramon Argueta (El Salvador)

March 19, 2000

| Nicaragua | 0–2 | Panama |
|---|---|---|
| | Report | Méndez 5'; Ju. Dely Valdés 61' |

Estadio Cacique Diriangén, Diriamba
Attendance: 2,000
Referee: David Jones (Belize)

April 2, 2000

| Panama | 1–0 | Honduras |
|---|---|---|
| Ju. Dely Valdés 70' (pen.) | Report |

Estadio Rommel Fernández, Panama City
Attendance: 20,000
Referee: Marvin Amores (Costa Rica)

April 16, 2000

| Nicaragua | 0–1 | Honduras |
|---|---|---|
| | Report | Ramírez 83' |

Estadio Cacique Diriangén, Diriamba
Attendance: 6,000
Referee: Hugo Castillo (Guatemala)

May 7, 2000

| Honduras | 3–1 | Panama |
|---|---|---|
| Pavón 38', 66'; Núñez 70' | Report | Jo. Dely Valdés 49' |

Estadio Tiburcio Carías Andino, Tegucigalpa
Attendance: 34,000
Referee: Mario Ramirez (Guatemala)

May 21, 2000

| Panama | 4–0 | Nicaragua |
|---|---|---|
| Ju. Dely Valdés 50'; Jo. Dely Valdés 69'; Díaz 70'; Brown 83' | Report |

Estadio Rommel Fernández, Panama City
Attendance: 20,000
Referee: Rodolfo Sibrian (El Salvador)

== Goalscorers ==
There were 30 goals scored in 12 matches, for an average of 2.5 goals per match.

4 goals

- (El Salvador national football team) Raúl Díaz Arce

3 goals

- (Panama national football team) Julio Dely Valdés

2 goals

- (El Salvador national football team) Jorge Rodríguez
- (Honduras national football team) Milton Núñez
- (Honduras national football team) Carlos Pavón
- (Panama national football team) Jorge Dely Valdés

1 goal

- (Belize national football team) Bent Burgess
- (Belize national football team) Emory Núñez
- (El Salvador national football team) Ronald Cerritos
- (El Salvador national football team) Elmer Martínez
- (El Salvador national football team) Roberto Guadalupe Martínez
- (El Salvador national football team) William Torres
- (Guatemala national football team) Freddy García
- (Guatemala national football team) Juan Carlos Plata
- (Guatemala national football team) Rudy Ramírez
- (Honduras national football team) Alex Pineda Chacon
- (Honduras national football team) Iván Guerrero
- (Honduras national football team) Luis Alfredo Ramírez
- (Panama national football team) Roberto Brown
- (Panama national football team) Neftali Díaz
- (Panama national football team) Mario Méndez
