= Freddy García (footballer) =

Guatemalan footballer (born 1977)

Personal information
- Full name: Freddy Alexander García Carrera
- Date of birth: 12 January 1977 (age 49)
- Place of birth: Puerto Barrios, Guatemala
- Height: 1.68 m (5 ft 6 in)
- Position: Midfielder

Team information
- Current team: Heredia

Youth career
- 1996–1998: Tally Juca

Senior career*
Years	Team	Apps	(Gls)
1998–1999	USAC		
1999–2002	Comunicaciones	60	(19)
2002	Columbus Crew	5	(0)
2003–2004	Municipal	60	(7)
2003	Columbus Crew	22	(1)
2004–2009	Municipal	128	(36)
2009–2010	Heredia	40	(13)
2010–2011	Halcones	18	(2)
2011–2012	Heredia	19	(5)

International career^{‡}
1998–2011	Guatemala	73	(23)
2000	Guatemala (futsal)		
- * Club domestic league appearances and goals as of 11 February 2010 ‡ National team caps and goals as of 27 March 2017

Freddy Alexander García Carrera (born 12 January 1977) is a Guatemalan professional footballer who last played for Heredia in the Guatemalan third division. He has played for several local clubs since 1997, and also in Major League Soccer for Columbus Crew, where he won the 2002 Lamar Hunt U.S. Open Cup.

Also a member of the Guatemala national team, he has played in four World Cup qualifying campaigns, and is among Guatemala's all-time top scorers.

== Club career ==
An attacking midfielder renowned for his accurate left foot, García was born in Puerto Barrios, and started his professional career with Universidad San Carlos (USAC). In 1999, he joined Comunicaciones, where he won two league titles. In 2002, he joined Columbus Crew in the MLS and played five regular season matches that year. He scored the championship-winning goal for Crew at the 2002 Lamar Hunt U.S. Open Cup Final against Los Angeles Galaxy. The following season, he appeared in 22 matches. Since 2004, he has returned to Guatemala to play for Municipal, helping that club win seven league championships. In June 2009 he left Municipal to join Heredia, going on to score 14 goals for the club in the 2009–2010 season. The following year, he played for Peñarol La Mesilla, before returning to Heredia for the 2011–12 season.

== International career ==
García is a member of the Guatemala national team, which he has represented during the 2002, 2006, 2010, and 2014 World Cup qualification campaigns. In 1997, he was part of the youth national team participating at the VI Juegos Deportivos Centroamericanos. He made his senior international debut in a November 1998 friendly match against Honduras

He also played futsal internationally, as he was part of his country's Futsal team competing at the 2000 Futsal World Championship which was held in Guatemala.

He made his return to the national squad in 2011 for a 2014 FIFA World Cup qualification match against Saint Vincent and the Grenadines and scored just minutes coming in as a substitute. He then scored two goals against Grenada later that year, tying Mario Camposeco for 4th place in the all-time goal scorers list for Guatemala with 23 goals.

=== International goals ===
Scores and results list Guatemala's goal tally first.

No	Date	Venue	Opponent	Score	Result	Competition
1.	26 March 1999	Estadio Nacional de Costa Rica, San José, Costa Rica	El Salvador	1–0	1–0	1999 UNCAF Nations Cup
2.	6 June 1999	Commonwealth Stadium, Edmonton, Canada	Iran	2–1	2–2	1999 Canada Cup
3.	10 November 1999	Estadio Mateo Flores, Guatemala City, Guatemala	Honduras	1–0	1–1	Friendly
4.	9 January 2000	Los Angeles Memorial Coliseum, Los Angeles, United States	Armenia	1–1	1–1	Friendly
5.	6 February 2000	Estadio Mateo Flores, Guatemala City, Guatemala	Chile	2–0	2–1	Friendly
6.	19 March 2000	Estadio Francisco Morazán, San Pedro Sula, Honduras	Belize	1–0	2–1	2002 FIFA World Cup qualification
7.	18 June 2000	Estadio Mateo Flores, Guatemala City, Guatemala	Antigua and Barbuda	7–1	8–1	2002 FIFA World Cup qualification
8.	18 June 2000	Estadio Mateo Flores, Guatemala City, Guatemala	Antigua and Barbuda	8–1	8–1	2002 FIFA World Cup qualification
9.	22 July 2000	Estadio Mario Camposeco, Quetzaltenango, Guatemala	Barbados	2–0	2–0	2002 FIFA World Cup qualification
10.	8 October 2000	Barbados National Stadium, St. Michael, Barbados	Barbados	1–0	3–1	2002 FIFA World Cup qualification
11.	21 February 2001	Estadio Rommel Fernández, Panama City, Panama	Panama	1–1	2–2	Friendly
12.	21 February 2001	Estadio Rommel Fernández, Panama City, Panama	Panama	2–2	2–2	Friendly
13.	25 May 2001	Estadio Nilmo Edwards, La Ceiba, Honduras	Belize	2–0	3–3	2001 UNCAF Nations Cup
14.	25 May 2001	Estadio Nilmo Edwards, La Ceiba, Honduras	Belize	3–3	3–3	2001 UNCAF Nations Cup
15.	3 June 2001	Estadio Olímpico Metropolitano, San Pedro Sula, Honduras	Panama	3–1	3–1	2001 UNCAF Nations Cup
16.	13 February 2003	Estadio Rommel Fernández, Panama City, Panama	Costa Rica	1–0	1–1	2003 UNCAF Nations Cup
17.	18 February 2003	Estadio Rommel Fernández, Panama City, Panama	Nicaragua	4–0	5–0	2003 UNCAF Nations Cup
18.	20 February 2003	Estadio Rommel Fernández, Panama City, Panama	El Salvador	1–0	2–0	2003 UNCAF Nations Cup
19.	31 March 2004	Estadio Cuscatlán, San Salvador, El Salvador	El Salvador	1–0	3–0	Friendly
20.	12 October 2005	Estadio Mateo Flores, Guatemala City, Guatemala	Costa Rica	2–0	3–1	2006 FIFA World Cup qualification
21.	2 September 2011	Estadio Mateo Flores, Guatemala City, Guatemala	Saint Vincent and the Grenadines	4–0	4–0	2014 FIFA World Cup qualification
22.	11 November 2011	Estadio Mateo Flores, Guatemala City, Guatemala	Grenada	1–0	3–0	2014 FIFA World Cup qualification
23.	11 November 2011	Estadio Mateo Flores, Guatemala City, Guatemala	Grenada	2–0	3–0	2014 FIFA World Cup qualification

== Honors ==
=== Columbus Crew ===
- Champion Lamar Hunt U.S. Open Cup (1): 2002
