= Jaime Vladimir Cubías =

Salvadoran footballer (born 1974)

Jaime Bladimir Cubías
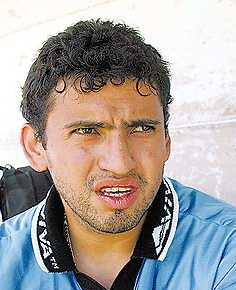

Personal information
- Full name: Jaime Bladimir Cubías Alvarado
- Date of birth: March 10, 1974 (age 52)
- Place of birth: San Sebastián, San Vicente, El Salvador
- Height: 1.60 m (5 ft 3 in)
- Position: Defender

Senior career*
Years	Team	Apps	(Gls)
1990–1999	FAS		(4)
1999–2000	Luis Ángel Firpo		(0)
2001–2002	Isidro Metapán		(2)
2002–2003	Águila		(0)
2003–2004	Alianza		
2004–2005	San Salvador		
2005	Real San Martín		
2005	Chalatenango		

International career^{‡}
1995–2002	El Salvador	25	(2)
- * Club domestic league appearances and goals as of 20 March 2011 ‡ National team caps and goals as of 20 March 2011

Jaime Bladimir Cubías Alvarado (born Marzo 10, 1974 in San Sebastián, El Salvador) is a retired Salvadoran football player.

== Club career ==
A rather short defender, Cubías made his debut in the Primera División de Fútbol de El Salvador at 16 years, playing for FAS. He won 2 championship medals with FAS in 1996 and 1997. He also played for the other big teams in the country, Luis Ángel Firpo, Isidro Metapán, Águila and Alianza. In 2005, he terminated his contract with San Salvador F.C. after a dispute over salary payments.

== International career ==
Nicknamed el Peluca (the wig), Cubías made his debut for El Salvador in a November 1995 friendly match against Yugoslavia and has earned a total of 25 caps, scoring 2 goals. He has represented his country in 2 FIFA World Cup qualification matches and played at the 1995 and 2001 UNCAF Nations Cups and at the 1996 and 2002 CONCACAF Gold Cups.

His final international was a January 2002 CONCACAF Gold Cup match against the United States.

=== International goals ===
Scores and results list El Salvador's goal tally first.

#	Date	Venue	Opponent	Score	Result	Competition
1	8 October 2000	Arnos Vale Stadium, Kingstown, St Vincent & Grenadines	Saint Vincent and the Grenadines	2–1	2–1	2002 FIFA World Cup qualification
2	6 March 2001	Estadio Carlos Salazar Hijo, Mazatenango, Guatemala	Guatemala	0–1	1–1	Friendly match
