= Mauricio Solís =

Costa Rican footballer (born 1972)

Personal information
- Full name: Mauricio Rodrigo Solís Mora
- Date of birth: 13 December 1972 (age 53)
- Place of birth: Heredia, Costa Rica
- Height: 1.77 m (5 ft 10 in)
- Positions: Midfielder; defender

Senior career*
Years	Team	Apps	(Gls)
1990–1997	Herediano	236	(1)
1997–1998	Derby County	11	(0)
1998–1999	Comunicaciones		
1999–2000	San Jose Clash	30	(4)
2001–2002	Alajuelense	42	(4)
2002–2003	OFI	38	(5)
2004	Irapuato	15	(1)
2004–2005	Alajuelense	29	(1)
2005–2007	Comunicaciones	54	(7)
2007–2010	Herediano	70	(5)
2011	Uruguay de Coronado		

International career
1993–2006	Costa Rica	110	(6)
- * Club domestic league appearances and goals

Mauricio Rodrigo Solís Mora (born 13 December 1972) is a former Costa Rican professional footballer who played in the two positions of midfielder and defender. He represented Costa Rica at two FIFA World Cups.

== Club career ==
Solís began his professional career with Herediano, making his debut with the club on 5 November 1990 against Limonense. He would remain with Herediano until 1996, winning the last Costa Rican championship Herediano won in the 1992–93 season.

=== Years abroad ===
He then moved to England, signing a contract with Derby County along with compatriot Paulo Wanchope. His stay there was short, however, and he returned to CONCACAF in 1998, playing with Comunicaciones of Guatemala for a year. Solís then moved to Major League Soccer, where he played parts of the 1999 and 2000 seasons for the San Jose Clash (later San Jose Earthquakes), registering 4 goals and 1 assist in 29 starts.

After two years in MLS, Solís returned to Costa Rica, where he signed a contract with Alajuelense. He played two seasons with the team, winning championships in 2000–01 and 2001–02, before looking overseas again, signing a contract with Greek club OFI to join fellow Tico Rónald Gómez. After a year with them, Solís again returned to America, playing the 2003–04 season in Mexico for Irapuato, after being brought to the team by former coach Alexandre Guimarães, then rejoined Alajuelense and in summer 2005 returned to Comunicaciones to play alongside compatriots Rolando Fonseca, Ricardo González and Jhonny Cubero.

=== Herediano return ===
In 2007, he transferred to Maccabi Netanya but his contract was terminated after preseason for certain complications so he came back to Costa Rica and decide to sign up for the teams he started his career Herediano. In March 2010 he became the 7th player to reach 300 matches for Los Florenses.

In April 2010, shortly after Herediano finish its participation in Costa Rican 2010 summer Championship, he announced his retirement from football. However, he reversed that decision when he joined Ricardo González and coach Paulo Wanchope at ambitious second division side Uruguay de Coronado in February 2011. He retired 5 months later.

== International career ==
Solís made his debut for Costa Rica in a September 1993 friendly match against Saudi Arabia and earned a total of 110 caps, scoring 6 goals. He represented his country in 30 FIFA World Cup qualification matches and played at both the 2002 and 2006 FIFA World Cups. He also played at the 1995, 1999 and 2001 UNCAF Nations Cups as well as at the 2002 and 2003 CONCACAF Gold Cups. He also played at the 1997 and 2001 Copa América.

Solís was the second Costa Rican behind Luis Marín to reach 100 caps in June 2005 against Guatemala.

His final international was a June 2006 FIFA World Cup match against Poland.

Appearances and goals by national team and year
National team	Year	Apps	Goals
Costa Rica	1993	2	0
Costa Rica	1994	3	0
Costa Rica	1995	8	0
Costa Rica	1996	16	0
Costa Rica	1997	12	2
Costa Rica	1999	9	2
Costa Rica	2000	5	0
Costa Rica	2001	18	1
Costa Rica	2002	12	0
Costa Rica	2003	8	0
Costa Rica	2004	5	0
Costa Rica	2005	7	1
Costa Rica	2006	5	0
Total		110	6

Scores and results list Costa Rica's goal tally first, score column indicates score after each Solís goal.

List of international goals scored by Mauricio Solís
No.	Date	Venue	Opponent	Score	Result	Competition	Ref.
1	19 February 1997	Estadio Eladio Rosabal Cordero, Heredia, Costa Rica	Venezuela	2–1	5–2	Friendly	
2	23 March 1997	Estadio Ricardo Saprissa Aymá, San José, Costa Rica	United States	2–1	3–2	1998 FIFA World Cup qualification	
3	24 February 1999	Estadio Ricardo Saprissa Aymá, San José, Costa Rica	Jamaica	1–0	9–0	Friendly	
4	24 February 1999	Estadio Ricardo Saprissa Aymá, San José, Costa Rica	Jamaica	2–0	9–0	Friendly	
5	1 July 2001	Estadio Nacional Chelato Uclés, Tegucigalpa, Honduras	Honduras	3–2	3–2	2002 FIFA World Cup qualification	
6	19 June 2005	Helong Sports Center Stadium, Changsha, China	China	1–1	2–2	Friendly	

== Retirement ==
Solís quit Herediano and football in April 2010. After retiring, Solis owned a bar-restaurant in Heredia.

In January he was named manager of Herediano, only to be dismissed a month later.

== Personal life ==
Born and raised in Los Ángeles de Santo Domingo de Heredia, Solís is a son of Rodrigo Solís and María de los Ángeles Mora and is married to Katia Moreira Chaverri and has three children.

== Honours ==
- Costa Rican Championship (4):
  - 1992–1993, 2000–01, 2001–02, 2004–05

== See also ==
- List of men's footballers with 100 or more international caps
