= Desmond Bleau =

Antigua and Barbudan footballer

Personal information
- Date of birth: September 2, 1982 (age 44)
- Place of birth: Dominica
- Position: Midfielder

Team information
- Current team: Null

International career
| Years | Team | Apps | (Gls) |
| 2000– | Antigua and Barbuda | 12 | (1) |

Desmond Bleau (born September 2, 1982) is an Antigua and Barbudan football player. He played for Antigua and Barbuda national team.

== National team statistics ==
Antigua and Barbuda national team
| Year | Apps | Goals |
|---|---|---|
| 2000 | 2 | 1 |
| 2001 | 0 | 0 |
| 2002 | 0 | 0 |
| 2003 | 0 | 0 |
| 2004 | 2 | 0 |
| 2005 | 1 | 0 |
| 2006 | 0 | 0 |
| 2007 | 0 | 0 |
| 2008 | 4 | 0 |
| 2009 | 0 | 0 |
| 2010 | 2 | 0 |
| Total | 11 | 1 |

=== International goals ===
Scores and results list Antigua and Barbuda's goal tally first.

| Goal | Date | Venue | Opponent | Score | Result | Competition |
|---|---|---|---|---|---|---|
| 1. | 18 June 2000 | Estadio Doroteo Guamuch Flores, Guatemala City, Guatemala | Guatemala | 1–4 | 1–8 | 2002 FIFA World Cup qualification |
