= Ante Razov =

American soccer player (born 1974)

Personal information
- Date of birth: March 2, 1974 (age 52)
- Place of birth: Whittier, California, United States
- Height: 6 ft 1 in (1.85 m)
- Position: Forward

College career
Years	Team	Apps	(Gls)
1992–1995	UCLA Bruins		

Senior career*
Years	Team	Apps	(Gls)
1996–1997	LA Galaxy	6	(1)
- → Sacramento (loan)
1998–2000	Chicago Fire	84	(42)
2000–2001	Racing Ferrol	19	(7)
2001–2004	Chicago Fire	72	(34)
2005	Columbus Crew	7	(1)
2005	MetroStars	18	(6)
2006–2009	Chivas USA	76	(30)
Total		262	(114)

International career
1995–2007	United States	25	(6)

Managerial career
- 2015–2016: Seattle Sounders FC (assistant)
- 2017: LA Galaxy (assistant)
- 2018–2025: Los Angeles FC (assistant)
Medal record
Representing United States
Winner	CONCACAF Gold Cup	2002
Men's Soccer
- * Club domestic league appearances and goals

Ante Razov (born March 2, 1974) is an American soccer coach and former player who was most recently an assistant coach for Los Angeles FC. A prolific forward, Razov is one of the leading goal scorers in the history of Major League Soccer (MLS) and the all-time leading goal scorer for two current or former MLS clubs: the Chicago Fire with 76 goals and Chivas USA with 30 goals. In April 2007, Razov became the third player in MLS history to score 100 goals. Razov also played for the United States men's national soccer team.

== Early life ==
Razov, who was born in a family of Croatian immigrants, spent his childhood in Fontana, California. He attended Fontana High School, and went on to play college soccer at UCLA.

== Club career ==
Razov was drafted by the Los Angeles Galaxy in the third round of the 1996 MLS College Draft. He played two seasons in LA, but did not get much playing time, scoring just one goal, and signed with the expansion Chicago Fire prior to the 1998 season. During his time with the Galaxy, he went on loan with the Sacramento Scorpions of USISL.

Razov spent the next seven years with Chicago, save a brief period in 2001 that he spent with Spanish second division club Racing de Ferrol. In his seven years with the Fire he led the club in goals and points five times (including club record 18 goals and 42 points in 2000). He is the club's all-time leader with 76 goals and 190 points. Razov was named to the MLS Best XI in 2003. With Chicago, he won the MLS Cup in 1998 and the US Open Cup in 1998, 2000, and 2003. Following a disappointing 2004 season and clashes with head coach Dave Sarachan, Razov was traded to the Columbus Crew in exchange for Tony Sanneh. However, one blemish in Razov's career was being stopped from the penalty spot in the 2003 MLS Cup. The Fire went on to lose the game, 4–2.

But Razov did not last long in Columbus. Even though he scored in the 2005 season opener, his tenure with the club lasted seven games. Disagreement with head coach Greg Andrulis led to Razov's reuniting with his ex-coach with the Fire, Bob Bradley, at the MetroStars. He was acquired in exchange for John Wolyniec and a partial allocation. After the season, Bradley acquired Razov again, for Thiago Martins and another partial allocation.

On April 21, 2007, Razov scored his 100th career regular-season MLS goal. At 33 years old, he became the third player in MLS history to reach 100 goals. At the time, he trailed only Jaime Moreno and Jeff Cunningham, having passed Jason Kreis. All three joined MLS at its inception in 1996.

== International career ==
Razov received his first cap with the U.S. national team on March 25, 1995, against Uruguay. Although he never played in the World Cup, he scored a couple of key goals in qualifiers, including one against Guatemala in 2000 and Trinidad and Tobago in 2001. Overall, Razov scored six goals in 25 caps for the US.

== Career statistics ==
=== International goals ===
No.	Date	Venue	Opponent	Score	Result	Competition	Ref.
1.	June 6, 2000	Foxboro Stadium, Foxboro, United States	Republic of Ireland	1 – 1	1 – 1	2000 U.S. Cup	
2.	June 11, 2000	Giants Stadium, East Rutherford, United States	Mexico	3 – 0	3 – 0	2000 U.S. Cup	
3.	July 16, 2000	Estadio Carlos Salazar Hijo, Mazatenango, Guatemala	Guatemala	1 – 0	1 – 1	2002 World Cup qualifying	
4.	November 15, 2000	Barbados National Stadium, Bridgetown, Barbados	Barbados	4 – 0	4 – 0	2002 World Cup qualifying	
5.	June 20, 2001	Foxboro Stadium, Foxboro, United States	Trinidad and Tobago	1 – 0	2 – 0	2002 World Cup qualifying	
6.	January 27, 2002	Rose Bowl, Pasadena, United States	El Salvador	4 – 0	4 – 0	2002 Gold Cup	

== Coaching career ==
In 2012, Razov was hired to serve as the LA Galaxy's U14 head coach. He replaced Craig Harrington, who was their coach for their first year in the Southern California Developmental Soccer League. Razov joined Seattle Sounders FC as an assistant coach under Sigi Schmid, his former college coach, in 2015.

Razov spent one season as an assistant coach for the LA Galaxy's senior squad under Curt Onalfo in 2017. In January 2018, he was announced as an assistant coach for expansion side Los Angeles FC under his former coach Bob Bradley.

== Honors ==
=== United States ===
- CONCACAF Gold Cup: 2002

=== Chicago Fire ===
- MLS Cup: 1998
- Supporters' Shield: 2003
- U.S. Open Cup: 1998, 2000, 2003

=== Individual ===
- MLS 100 goals club
- MLS 50/50 Club
- MLS All-Star: 2000
- MLS Best XI: 2003
