= Ronald Cerritos =

Salvadoran footballer (born 1975)

Personal information
- Full name: Ronald Osvaldo Cerritos Flores
- Date of birth: January 3, 1975 (age 51)
- Place of birth: San Salvador, El Salvador
- Height: 5 ft 9 in (1.75 m)
- Position: Striker

Senior career*
Years	Team	Apps	(Gls)
1993–1997	ADET		
1997–2001	San Jose Earthquakes	118	(55)
2002–2003	Dallas Burn	38	(7)
2003–2004	D.C. United	20	(2)
2004	Alianza		
2005	San Jose Earthquakes	30	(6)
2006	Houston Dynamo	15	(0)
2006–2007	San Salvador	48	(9)
2008	Real Maryland Monarchs	15	(2)
2008	Carolina RailHawks	7	(1)

International career
1993–2008	El Salvador	70	(8)

Managerial career
- D.C. United Academy U-14/15
- * Club domestic league appearances and goals

Ronald Osvaldo Cerritos Flores (born January 3, 1975) is a Salvadoran former professional footballer who played as a striker.

Cerritos was once the all-time leader in assists of the Major League Soccer team, the San Jose Earthquakes, with 47. He has since been surpassed by Shea Salinas and the current leader, Cristian Espinoza.

== Club career ==
Cerritos has spent the bulk of his career playing in MLS, being signed by the league on March 21, 1997, and allocated to the San Jose Clash. While with San Jose he achieved great success, being named in the MLS Best XI in his first year with the club. In the offseason after 2001, however, Cerritos was traded to the Dallas Burn for Ariel Graziani. He never was able to settle in Dallas, having trouble earning a starting spot, and struggling with injuries.

After a year and a half at Dallas, during which he scored seven goals, Cerritos was traded to D.C. United for Ali Curtis and a first-round pick in the 2004 MLS SuperDraft. Cerritos again was largely unproductive in D.C. and was cut midway through the 2004 season because his performances were not justifying his large salary, and returned to play for Alianza in his native El Salvador. After the season with Alianza he returned to MLS and his original team, with San Jose acquiring him from DC for a draft pick. During his returning season, Cerritos scored an additional 6 goals. He is 2nd on San Jose's all-time scoring list, with 61 goals and also has the honor of having the most assists, with 47. Shortly after his return to the Earthquakes, however, Cerritos was moved to Houston for the 2006 season along with his teammates. Despite his success with San Jose his resulting stint with the Houston Dynamo was short-lived, as he was released in August 2006.

He was later signed by San Salvador F.C. on a two-year deal and became an outstanding performer week in and week out, soon being recalled to the El Salvador national team to participate in the 2007 CONCACAF Gold Cup in the United States.

In November 2007, Cerritos signed a two-year contract with expansion Real Maryland FC USL Second Division. He played fifteen games, scoring two goals, but was released by the team after their 6–0 loss to the Richmond Kickers, a game in which he did not play. On July 31, 2008, Cerritos signed with the Carolina RailHawks of the USL First Division. He finished the season with the RailHawks, but was not signed by the team for the 2009 season.

At half time of the match between the San Jose Earthquakes and Chicago Fire on September 29, 2010, Cerritos became the second player inducted into the San Jose Earthquakes Hall of Fame.

== International career ==
Cerritos has been a mainstay in the El Salvador national team, having made over 60 appearances. He made his debut for the national team against the USA on 5 December 1993 and scored his first goal for El Salvador in a 3–2 victory over Trinidad and Tobago on January 10, 1996, in a 1996 CONCACAF Gold Cup match.

On March 5, 2000, in a FIFA World Cup qualification match against Belize, Cerritos scored El Salvador's 400th goal in all senior international matches.

=== International goals ===
Scores and results list El Salvador's goal tally first.

#	Date	Venue	Opponent	Score	Result	Competition
1	10 January 1996	Edison International Field, Anaheim, United States	Trinidad and Tobago	2–0	3–2	1996 CONCACAF Gold Cup
2	25 September 1996	Memorial Coliseum, Los Angeles, United States	Guatemala	1–1	2–1	Friendly match
3	29 May 1999	Giants Stadium, East Rutherford, United States	Colombia	2–1	2–1	Friendly match
4	5 March 2000	Estadio Cuscatlán, San Salvador, El Salvador	Belize	3–0	5–0	2002 FIFA World Cup qualification
5	6 February 2008	Estadio Cuscatlán, San Salvador, El Salvador	Anguilla	5–0	12–0	2010 FIFA World Cup qualification
6	6 February 2008	Estadio Cuscatlán, San Salvador, El Salvador	Anguilla	10–0	12–0	2010 FIFA World Cup qualification
7	6 February 2008	Estadio Cuscatlán, San Salvador, El Salvador	Anguilla	12–0	12–0	2010 FIFA World Cup qualification
8	26 March 2008	RFK Stadium, Washington D.C., United States	Anguilla	1–0	4–0	2010 FIFA World Cup qualification

== Personal life ==
Cerritos is married to Brenda Cerritos, Cerritos son, Alexis Cerritos, is also a professional footballer who plays for the El Salvador national football team.

In his spare time, Cerritos enjoys playing cards and playing basketball with his friends. He enjoys spending time with his two sons. He currently lives Maryland.

He now has his own Soccer Club named Cerritos Soccer Academy, youth kids from 5–19 years old.

== Honors ==
San Jose Earthquakes

- MLS Cup: 2001

Individual

- MLS 50/50 Club
- MLS All-Star: 1997, 1999
- MLS Best XI: 1997
- MLS Fair Play Award: 2005
- Inducted to San Jose Earthquakes Hall of Fame: 2010
