= 2002 FIFA World Cup qualification – CONCACAF Caribbean/Central American play-offs =

The CONCACAF Caribbean/Central American play-offs of 2002 FIFA World Cup qualification were contested between six CONCACAF members located in the Caribbean and Central American areas.

The six teams consisted of the three runners-up from the Caribbean zone, the two group runners-up from the Central American zone and Canada. The teams played in a knockout tournament, with matches on a home-and-away basis. The winners of each match advanced to the semi-final round.

== Summary ==
Team 1	Agg.	Team 2	1st leg	2nd leg
Cuba	0–1	Canada	0–1	0–0
Antigua and Barbuda	1–9	Guatemala	0–1	1–8
Honduras	7–1	Haiti	4–0	3–1

== Matches ==
June 4, 2000

Cuba	0–1	Canada
	Report	De Vos 39'

Estadio Pedro Marrero, Havana
Attendance: 6,000
Referee: Marcio Carranza (Honduras)
June 11, 2000

Canada	0–0	Cuba
	Report

Winnipeg Soccer Complex, Winnipeg
Attendance: 9,000
Referee: Victorino Rodriguez (El Salvador)

Canada won 1–0 on aggregate and advanced to the semi-final round.

June 11, 2000

Antigua and Barbuda	0–1	Guatemala
	Report	Ramírez 32'

Antigua Recreation Ground, St. John's
Attendance: 4,000
Referee: Kevin Stott (United States)
June 18, 2000

Guatemala	8–1	Antigua and Barbuda
Valencia 19'; Ruiz 31'; Ramírez 33'; Plata 37', 80'; Funes 72'; García 83', 88'	Report	Bleau 60'

Estadio Mateo Flores, Guatemala City
Attendance: 4,500
Referee: Edgar Rangel Perez (Mexico)

Guatemala won 9–1 on aggregate and advanced to the semi-final round.

June 3, 2000

Honduras	4–0	Haiti
Núñez 31'; F. Pavón 40'; C. Pavón 77'; Caballero 87'	Report

Estadio Francisco Morazán, San Pedro Sula
Attendance: 22,000
Referee: José Robles (Mexico)
June 17, 2000

Haiti	1–3	Honduras
Pierre 51'	Report	Caballero 7'; Núñez 50'; De León 87'

Stade Sylvio Cator, Port-au-Prince
Attendance: 4,000
Referee: Brian Hall (United States)

Honduras won 7–1 on aggregate and advanced to the semi-final round.

== Goalscorers ==
There were 19 goals scored in 6 matches, for an average of 3.17 goals per match.

2 goals

- (Guatemala) Freddy García
- (Guatemala) Juan Carlos Plata
- (Guatemala) Guillermo Ramírez
- (Honduras) Samuel Caballero
- (Honduras) Milton Núñez

1 goal

- (Antigua and Barbuda) Desmond Bleau
- (Canada) Jason de Vos
- (Guatemala) Juan Manuel Funes
- (Guatemala) Carlos Ruiz
- (Guatemala) Edgar Valencia
- (Haiti) Golman Pierre
- (Honduras) Julio César de León
- (Honduras) Carlos Pavón
- (Honduras) Francisco Antonio Pavón
