= José Manuel Abundis =

Mexican footballer (born 1973)

Personal information
- Full name: José Manuel Abundis Sandoval
- Date of birth: 11 June 1973 (age 53)
- Place of birth: Guadalajara, Jalisco, Mexico
- Height: 1.77 m (5 ft 9 1/2 in)
- Position: Forward

Senior career*
Years	Team	Apps	(Gls)
1992–2000	Toluca	197	(63)
2000–2002	Atlante	58	(21)
2002	Monterrey	8	(0)
2003	Pachuca	5	(0)
2003	Atlante	14	(2)
2004–2006	Toluca	73	(17)
2006	New England Revolution	4	(1)
2007–2008	Querétaro	12	(0)
Total		371	(104)

International career
1996–2001	Mexico	47	(10)

Managerial career
- 2011: Atlanta Silverbacks
- 2019–2020: Poza Rica
Medal record
Men's football
Representing Mexico
FIFA Confederations Cup
Winner	1999 Mexico
Copa América
Third place	1997 Bolivia
- * Club domestic league appearances and goals

José Manuel Abundis Sandoval (Note: In this Spanish name, the first or paternal surname is Abundis and the second or maternal family name is Sandoval.) (born 11 June 1973) is a Mexican former professional footballer who played as a forward.

== Career ==
Abundis last played for Querétaro F.C. in 2008. He made his debut for the New England Revolution in Major League Soccer on 30 September 2006, scoring the second goal in a 3–1 victory against Columbus Crew SC, but was not re-signed at the end of the season, following disputes with coach Steve Nicol over playing time.

He represented Mexico at the 1996 Summer Olympics and the 1999 FIFA Confederations Cup. He scored 3 goals in the tournament, including one in the final.

Abundis served as head coach of Atlanta Silverbacks during the 2011 North American Soccer League season. He was fired by Atlanta on 7 November 2011.

On 18 June 2019. Abundis was appointed as head coach of Petroleros de Poza Rica, a team that plays in the Mexican Third Division.

== Career statistics ==
=== International goals ===
Scores and results list Mexico's goal tally first.

Goal	Date	Venue	Opponent	Score	Result	Competition
1.	19 February 1999	Hong Kong Stadium, Wan Chai, Hong Kong	Egypt	2–0	3–0	1999 Lunar New Year Cup
2.	13 March 1999	Qualcomm Stadium, San Diego, United States	United States	2–1	2–1	1999 U.S. Cup
3.	25 July 1999	Estadio Azteca, Mexico City, Mexico	Saudi Arabia	3–0	5–1	1999 FIFA Confederations Cup
4.	27 July 1999	Estadio Azteca, Mexico City, Mexico	Egypt	2–0	2–2	1999 FIFA Confederations Cup
5.	4 August 1999	Estadio Azteca, Mexico City, Mexico	Brazil	2–0	4–3	1999 FIFA Confederations Cup
6.	19 January 2000	Estadio Tecnológico, Monterrey, Mexico	Romania	3–1	3–1	Friendly
7.	5 July 2000	Estadio Tecnológico, Monterrey, Mexico	Venezuela	2–1	2–1	Friendly
8.	15 August 2000	Estadio Azteca, Mexico City, Mexico	Canada	1–0	2–0	2002 FIFA World Cup qualification
9.	3 September 2000	Estadio Azteca, Mexico City, Mexico	Panama	2–0	7–1	2002 FIFA World Cup qualification
10.	16 June 2001	Estadio Azteca, Mexico City, Mexico	Costa Rica	1–0	1–2	2002 FIFA World Cup qualification

== Honours ==
Toluca

- Mexican Primera División: Verano 1998, Verano 1999, Verano 2000, Apertura 2005

Mexico

- FIFA Confederations Cup: 1999
- CONCACAF Pre-Olympic Tournament: 1996
