= Roberto Martínez (footballer, born 1973) =

Salvadoran footballer

Personal information
- Full name: Roberto Guadalupe Martínez
- Date of birth: February 21, 1973 (age 53)
- Place of birth: San Miguel, El Salvador
- Height: 1.69 m (5 ft 6 1/2 in)
- Position: Defender

Senior career*
Years	Team	Apps	(Gls)
- España
- Liberal
1996–2002	Águila		
2003–2004	Alianza		
2004–2005	Once Municipal		

International career^{‡}
1997–2000	El Salvador	19	(2)
- * Club domestic league appearances and goals as of 13 July 2011 ‡ National team caps and goals as of 13 July 2011

Roberto Guadalupe Martínez (born 21 February 1973, in San Miguel, El Salvador) is a retired Salvadoran footballer.

== Club career ==
Nicknamed Catalnica, Martínez started his career at lower league side Espana and Liberal before making his debut in the Primera División de Fútbol de El Salvador with Águila in 1996. He also played for Alianza and Once Municipal.

== International career ==
Martínez made his debut for El Salvador in a June 1997 World Cup qualification match against Mexico and has earned a total of 19 caps, scoring 2 goals. He has represented his country in over 7 World Cup qualification matches.

His final international game was a July 2000 World Cup qualification match against Honduras.

=== International goals ===
Scores and results list El Salvador's goal tally first.

#	Date	Venue	Opponent	Score	Result	Competition
1	5 March 2000	Estadio Cuscatlán, San Salvador, El Salvador	Belize	1-0	5-0	2002 FIFA World Cup qualification
2	28 March 2000	Estadio Flor Blanca, San Salvador, El Salvador	Haiti	3-1	3-1	friendly match
