= 2002 FIFA World Cup qualification (CONCACAF) =

Tournament details
- Dates: March 4th 2000 - November 11th 2001
- Teams: 34 (from 1 confederation)

Tournament statistics
- Matches played: 125
- Goals scored: 391 (3.13 per match)
- Attendance: 2,329,088 (18,633 per match)
- Top scorer(s): (Honduras) Carlos Pavón (15 goals)

The 2002 FIFA World Cup qualification, ran from 2000 to 2001 in order to determine the three representatives at the 2002 FIFA World Cup. For an overview of the qualification rounds, see 2002 FIFA World Cup qualification.

A total of 35 CONCACAF teams entered the competition. Guyana were suspended by FIFA before playing, leaving 34 nations in the race. Mexico, USA, Jamaica and Costa Rica, the four highest-ranked teams according to FIFA, received byes and advanced to the semi-finals, while Canada advanced directly to the "play-offs" between Caribbean and Central teams. The remaining teams were divided into two zones, based on geographical locations.

== Format ==
- Caribbean Zone: The 24 teams were divided into groups of eight teams each. The teams played in a three-round knockout tournament. The winners would advance to the semi-finals, while the runners-up would advance to the play-offs. Due to Guyana not playing, Antigua & Barbuda joined the second round directly.
- Central American Zone: The six teams were divided into two groups of three teams. The teams played against each other. The winners of the group would advance to the semi-finals, while the runners-up would advance to the play-offs.
- In the play-offs, Canada and the five concerned teams were paired up to play knockout matches on a home-and-away basis. A team from North or Central America would play against a team from the Caribbean, and the three winners would advance to the semi-finals.

In the semi-finals round, the 12 teams were divided into three groups of four teams each. They played against each other on a home-and-away basis. The group winners and runners-up would advance to the final round.

In the final round, the six teams played against each other on a home-and-away basis. The top three teams would qualify for the 2002 FIFA World Cup. This year there is no play-off against another continent.

== Caribbean Zone ==
=== Group 1 ===
First round
Cuba	4	0	4
Cayman Islands	0	0	0
Saint Lucia	1	0	1 (1)
Suriname (p)	0	1	1 (3)
Aruba	4	2	6
Puerto Rico	2	2	4
Barbados (a.e.t.)	2	3	5
Grenada	2	2	4

Second round
Cuba	1	0	1
Suriname	0	0	0
Aruba	1	0	1
Barbados	3	4	7

Third round
Cuba	1	1	2 (4)
Barbados (p)	1	1	2 (5)

=== Group 2 ===
In the first round, Guyana were suspended by FIFA, so Antigua and Barbuda obtained a bye to the second round.

First round
Antigua and Barbuda (w/o)
Guyana
British Virgin Islands	1	0	1
Bermuda	5	9	14
Saint Vincent and the Grenadines	9	5	14
U.S. Virgin Islands	0	1	1
Saint Kitts and Nevis	8	6	14
Turks and Caicos Islands	0	0	0

Second round
Antigua and Barbuda (aet)	0	1	1 (a)
Bermuda	0	1	1
Saint Vincent and the Grenadines	1	2	3
Saint Kitts and Nevis	0	1	1

Third round
Antigua and Barbuda	2	0	2
Saint Vincent and the Grenadines	1	4	5

=== Group 3 ===
First round
Trinidad and Tobago	5	1	6
Netherlands Antilles	0	1	1
Dominican Republic	3	3	6
Montserrat	0	1	1
Haiti	4	3	7
Dominica	0	1	1
Anguilla	1	1	2
Bahamas	3	2	5

Second round
Trinidad and Tobago	3	1	4
Dominican Republic	0	0	0
Haiti	9	4	13
Bahamas	0	0	0

Third round
Trinidad and Tobago	3	1	4
Haiti	1	1	2

== Central American Zone ==
=== Group A ===
Pos	Team	Pld	W	D	L	GF	GA	GD	Pts	Qualification	(El Salvador)	(Guatemala)	(Belize)
1	El Salvador	4	3	1	0	10	2	+8	10	Qualify for the semi-finals	—	1–1	5–0
2	Guatemala	4	1	2	1	3	3	0	5	Advance to the play-offs	0–1	—	0–0
3	Belize	4	0	1	3	2	10	−8	1		1–3	1–2	—

=== Group B ===
Pos	Team	Pld	W	D	L	GF	GA	GD	Pts	Qualification	Panama national football team	Honduras national football team	Nicaragua national football team
1	Panama	4	3	0	1	8	3	+5	9	Qualify for the semi-finals	—	1–0	4–0
2	Honduras	4	3	0	1	7	2	+5	9	Advance to the play-offs	3–1	—	3–0
3	Nicaragua	4	0	0	4	0	10	−10	0		0–2	0–1	—

== Caribbean/Central American play-offs ==
Team 1	Agg.	Team 2	1st leg	2nd leg
Cuba	0–1	Canada	0–1	0–0
Antigua and Barbuda	1–9	Guatemala	0–1	1–8
Honduras	7–1	Haiti	4–0	3–1

== Semifinal round ==
=== Group 1 ===
Pos	Team	Pld	W	D	L	GF	GA	GD	Pts	Qualification	Trinidad and Tobago national football team	Mexico national football team	Canada men's national soccer team	Panama national football team
1	Trinidad and Tobago	6	5	0	1	14	7	+7	15	Advance to the final round	—	1–0	4–0	6–0
2	Mexico	6	4	1	1	17	2	+15	13	Advance to the final round	7–0	—	2–0	7–1
3	Canada	6	1	2	3	1	8	−7	5		0–2	0–0	—	1–0
4	Panama	6	0	1	5	1	16	−15	1		0–1	0–1	0–0	—

=== Group 2 ===
Pos	Team	Pld	W	D	L	GF	GA	GD	Pts	Qualification	Honduras national football team	Jamaica national football team	El Salvador national football team	Saint Vincent and the Grenadines national football team
1	Honduras	6	5	0	1	25	5	+20	15	Advance to the final round	—	1–0	5–0	6–0
2	Jamaica	6	4	0	2	7	4	+3	12	Advance to the final round	3–1	—	1–0	2–0
3	El Salvador	6	3	0	3	13	13	0	9		2–5	2–0	—	7–1
4	Saint Vincent and the Grenadines	6	0	0	6	2	25	−23	0		0–7	0–1	1–2	—

=== Group 3 ===
Pos	Team	Pld	W	D	L	GF	GA	GD	Pts	Qualification	United States men's national soccer team	Costa Rica national football team	Guatemala national football team	Barbados national football team
1	United States	6	3	2	1	14	3	+11	11	Advance to the final round	—	0–0	1–0	7–0
2	Costa Rica	6	3	1	2	9	6	+3	10 (Note: As Costa Rica and Guatemala finished level on points, goal differential, goals scored and head-to-head record, a play-off on neutral ground was played to determine second place. Costa Rica won the play-off 5–2 to finish second.)	Advance to the final round	2–1	—	2–1	3–0
3	Guatemala	6	3	1	2	9	6	+3	10		1–1	2–1	—	2–0
4	Barbados	6	1	0	5	3	20	−17	3		0–4	2–1	1–3	—

== Final round ==
Pos	Team	Pld	W	D	L	GF	GA	GD	Pts	Qualification	Costa Rica	Mexico	United States	Honduras	Jamaica	Trinidad and Tobago
1	Costa Rica	10	7	2	1	17	7	+10	23	Qualified to the 2002 FIFA World Cup	—	0–0	2–0	2–2	2–1	3–0
2	Mexico	10	5	2	3	16	9	+7	17	Qualified to the 2002 FIFA World Cup	1–2	—	1–0	3–0	4–0	3–0
3	United States	10	5	2	3	11	8	+3	17	Qualified to the 2002 FIFA World Cup	1–0	2–0	—	2–3	2–1	2–0
4	Honduras	10	4	2	4	17	17	0	14		2–3	3–1	1–2	—	1–0	0–1
5	Jamaica	10	2	2	6	7	14	−7	8		0–1	1–2	0–0	1–1	—	1–0
6	Trinidad and Tobago	10	1	2	7	5	18	−13	5		0–2	1–1	0–0	2–4	1–2	—

Source: FIFA

== Qualified teams ==
The following three teams from CONCACAF qualified for the final tournament.

Team	Qualified as	Qualified on	Previous appearances in FIFA World Cup^{1}
Costa Rica	Final round winners	5 September 2001	1 (1990)
Mexico	Final round runners-up	11 November 2001	11 (1930, 1950, 1954, 1958, 1962, 1966, 1970, 1978, 1986, 1994, 1998)
United States	Final round third place	7 October 2001	6 (1930, 1934, 1950, 1990, 1994, 1998)

^{1} Bold indicates champions for that year. Italic indicates hosts for that year.

== Top goalscorers ==
There were 391 goals scored in 125 matches, for an average of 3.13 goals per match.

15 goals

- (Honduras) Carlos Pavón

11 goals

- (Haiti) Golman Pierre

10 goals

- (Costa Rica) Rolando Fonseca

9 goals

- (Mexico) Cuauhtémoc Blanco

8 goals

- (Guatemala) Carlos Ruiz
- (Honduras) Milton Núñez
- (United States) Earnie Stewart

7 goals

- (Costa Rica) Paulo Wanchope
- (El Salvador) Raúl Díaz Arce

6 goals

- (Barbados) Jerry Alexander
- (Barbados) Llewellyn Riley
- (Honduras) Samuel Caballero
- (Jamaica) Onandi Lowe
- (Mexico) Jared Borgetti
- (Saint Vincent and the Grenadines) James Chewitt
- (Trinidad and Tobago) Angus Eve

Below are full goalscorer lists for each round:

- Caribbean Zone
- Central American Zone
- Play-offs
- Semi-finals
- Final round

== See also ==
- Aztecazo
