= Rolando Fonseca =

Costa Rican footballer (born 1974)

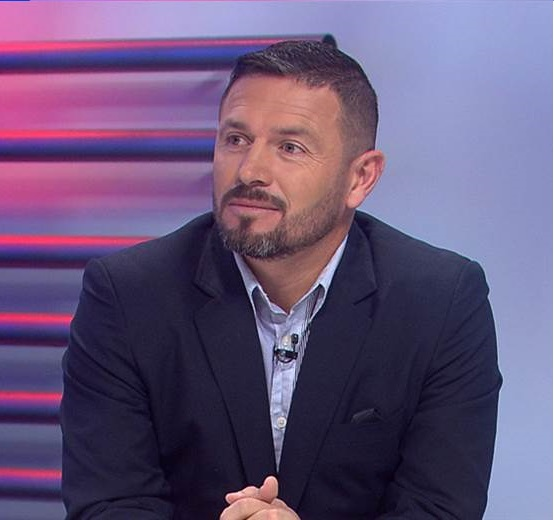
- Fonseca in 2021

Personal information
- Full name: Rolando Fonseca Jiménez
- Date of birth: 6 June 1974 (age 52)
- Place of birth: San José, Costa Rica
- Height: 1.72 m (5 ft 8 in)
- Positions: Second striker; striker

Youth career
- Saprissa

Senior career*
Years	Team	Apps	(Gls)
1989–1995	Saprissa	28	(33)
1996	Pachuca	27	(9)
1996	Independiente Medellín	12	(7)
1997	América de Cali	22	(0)
1997	Alajuelense	11	(2)
1998–2000	Comunicaciones	40	(44)
2000–2001	Saprissa	34	(18)
2001–2002	La Piedad	12	(5)
2002–2007	Alajuelense	117	(61)
2003	→ Comunicaciones (loan)	23	(10)
2006	→ Comunicaciones (loan)	17	(4)
2007	Municipal Liberia	15	(5)
2008–2011	Comunicaciones	79	(36)
2012	Carmelita	3	(0)
Total		440	(234)

International career
1992–2011	Costa Rica	113	(47)
2000	Costa Rica (futsal)		
- * Club domestic league appearances and goals

Rolando Fonseca Jiménez (born 6 June 1974) is a Costa Rican former professional footballer who played as a forward.

Nicknamed El Principito (The little prince) and El Rolo, Fonseca usually played just off the main striker and was renowned for his ability to create opportunities for his teammates and his fierce long shot.

With 47 goals, Fonseca is the Costa Rica national team's all-time top goalscorer.

== Club career ==
Fonseca played for Comunicaciones in Guatemala, Independiente Medellín and América de Cali in Colombia, Pachuca and La Piedad in Mexico, as well as having home spells with Saprissa, Alajuelense and Municipal Liberia.

In Costa Rica, he played a total of 271 games, scoring over 100 goals, between the league's two best teams, Saprissa and Alajuelense. His debut was with Deportivo Saprissa, on 1 June 1991, against ASODELI, and scored his first goal against San Carlos on 28 August. He also won Costa Rican championships in 1993–94, 1994–95 (Saprissa), and 1996–97, 2001–02, 2002–03 and 2004–05 (Alajuelense), adding three CONCACAF Champions' Cups in 1993, 1995 (Saprissa), and 2004 (Alajuelense). Outside Costa Rica, Fonseca won league titles with Comunicaciones in 1998, 1999, 2000, 2002, 2008, and 2010, and with América de Cali in 1997.

After solid performances with Alajuelense and the national team, Fonseca received offers in 2007 from China, Chile, Turkey and Major League Soccer, but finally settled, as co-owner, player and captain of Municipal Liberia. Although he was having a great season, he left the project a few days before finishing the Apertura tournament, apparently due to personal issues and some differences with then co-owner Mario Sotela. Rumors surfaced that Fonseca would return to Alajuelense, but they were all quickly discarded.

After failed negotiations with Brujas, Fonseca returned to Comunicaciones, a team he had already represented on two other spells, remaining as one of side's best imports ever. Fonseca retired in January 2011, but a year and seven months later, he made his return to professional football by joining Asociación Deportiva Carmelita on 19 August 2012. After three matches with Carmelita, he was released in September 2012. Coach Orlando de León cited that Fonseca has been busy with his other activities besides football.

== International career ==
Fonseca has also been a fixture on the Costa Rica national team since 1992. He played in more than 100 internationals, and is currently the nation's all-time scorer, with 47 goals.

Fonseca earned his first cap at the age of 17 on 27 May 1992, in a friendly match against Ecuador. By November of that year, he appeared in a 1994 World Cup qualifier against St. Vincent and the Grenadines, the first of his five World Cup qualifying campaigns for Costa Rica. The following year saw Fonseca's first international goal, which came on 9 March in an UNCAF Nations Cup match against Panama.

By late 1996, Fonseca had become a regular in the national team, playing four World Cup qualifiers in the fall. He scored a hat trick against Honduras in the 1997 UNCAF Nations Cup, the first of three in his international career. He earned a call to the squad for the Copa América in Bolivia, but he appeared only in the first-round match against Mexico as the team lost all three group games.

At the turn of the millennium, Fonseca was entering the highest-scoring stretch of his international career; he scored eight times for Costa Rica in 1999, six times in 2000, and twelve times in 2001. During the same period, Costa Rica rose fast in CONCACAF, finishing in first place in World Cup qualifying. At the 2001 Copa América, Fonseca appeared in all four matches and scored against Bolivia, as the Costa Ricans won their first-round group with a team that also included Paulo César Wanchope, Walter Centeno, and Hernán Medford. Fonseca played in two games for the team at the 2002 World Cup, appearing in the first-round matches against China and Brazil.

Fonseca remained in the national team after the World Cup, playing in the 2003 CONCACAF Gold Cup and scoring twice against the United States, but he was limited to only one cap in 2004 and two in 2005. He was excluded from the 2006 FIFA World Cup squad selected by Alexandre Guimarães. Upon the appointment of former teammate Medford as national coach, however, Fonseca returned to the national team in early 2007. He appeared only once for Costa Rica during the two-year span after the 2007 CONCACAF Gold Cup, but he was recalled late in 2009 for the last stages of World Cup qualifying by coach René Simões. Fonseca played his final competitive international match in the intercontinental playoff match against Uruguay on 18 November 2009, coming off the bench for the last 26 minutes.

His 47th and last international goal came against Chile, in a spectacular strike with his back to the goal, which also meant the number 1000 for Costa Rica in international matches. The all-time top scorer in the UNCAF Nations Cup with 19 goals, Fonseca was voted the tournament's best player in 1999, adding five goals.

On 26 March 2011, Rolando Fonseca played in the first game of the new Costa Rican Estadio Nacional against China. He substituted Álvaro Saborío in the 78th minute. This was his last game with the Costa Rica national football team, as he retired from international play as Costa Rica's all-time leading scorer.

== Career statistics ==
=== International ===
Appearances and goals by national team and year
National team	Year	Apps	Goals
Costa Rica	1992	6	0
Costa Rica	1993	7	3
Costa Rica	1994	1	0
Costa Rica	1995	4	3
Costa Rica	1996	6	0
Costa Rica	1997	9	4
Costa Rica	1999	10	8
Costa Rica	2000	8	6
Costa Rica	2001	21	12
Costa Rica	2002	9	2
Costa Rica	2003	12	3
Costa Rica	2004	1	1
Costa Rica	2005	2	0
Costa Rica	2007	12	5
Costa Rica	2008	1	0
Costa Rica	2009	3	0
Costa Rica	2011	1	0
Total		113	47

Scores and results list Costa Rica's goal tally first, score column indicates score after each Fonseca goal.

Table key
Indicates Costa Rica won the match
Indicates the match ended in a draw
Indicates Costa Rica lost the match

List of international goals scored by Rolando Fonseca
No.	Date	Venue	Opponent	Score	Result	Competition	Ref.
1	9 March 1993	Estadio Nacional Chelato Uclés, Tegucigalpa, Honduras	Panama	2–0	2–0	1993 UNCAF Nations Cup	
2	31 March 1993	Estadio Atanasio Girardot, Medellín, Colombia	Colombia	1–2	1–4	Friendly	
3	23 June 1993	Estadio Nacional, San José, Costa Rica	Panama	2–0	3–1	Friendly	
4	1 December 1995	Estadio Nacional Flor Blanca, San Salvador, El Salvador	Belize	1–0	2–1	1995 UNCAF Nations Cup	
5	7 December 1995	Estadio Nacional Flor Blanca, San Salvador, El Salvador	Honduras	1–0	1–1 (a.e.t.), (2–4 p)	1995 UNCAF Nations Cup	
6	10 December 1995	Estadio Cuscatlán, San Salvador, El Salvador	El Salvador	1–2	1–2	1995 UNCAF Nations Cup	
7	23 April 1997	Estadio Doroteo Guamuch Flores, Guatemala City, Guatemala	Honduras	1–0	4–0	1997 UNCAF Nations Cup	
8	23 April 1997	Estadio Doroteo Guamuch Flores, Guatemala City, Guatemala	Honduras	2–0	4–0	1997 UNCAF Nations Cup	
9	23 April 1997	Estadio Doroteo Guamuch Flores, Guatemala City, Guatemala	Honduras	4–0	4–0	1997 UNCAF Nations Cup	
10	27 April 1997	Estadio Doroteo Guamuch Flores, Guatemala City, Guatemala	Guatemala	1–0	1–1	1997 UNCAF Nations Cup	
11	24 February 1999	Estadio Ricardo Saprissa Aymá, San Juan de Tibás, Costa Rica	Jamaica	4–0	9–0	Friendly	
12	24 February 1999	Estadio Ricardo Saprissa Aymá, San Juan de Tibás, Costa Rica	Jamaica	5–0	9–0	Friendly	
13	17 March 1999	Estadio Nacional, San José, Costa Rica	Belize	2–0	7–0	1999 UNCAF Nations Cup	
14	17 March 1999	Estadio Nacional, San José, Costa Rica	Belize	6–0	7–0	1999 UNCAF Nations Cup	
15	24 March 1999	Estadio Nacional, San José, Costa Rica	Guatemala	1–0	1–0	1999 UNCAF Nations Cup	
16	26 March 1999	Estadio Nacional, San José, Costa Rica	Honduras	1–1	1–2	1999 UNCAF Nations Cup	
17	28 March 1999	Estadio Nacional, San José, Costa Rica	El Salvador	3–0	4–0	1999 UNCAF Nations Cup	
18	18 August 1999	Estadio Centenario, Montevideo, Uruguay	Uruguay	3–4	4–5	Friendly	
19	1 July 2000	Estadio Alejandro Morera Soto, Alajuela, Costa Rica	Panama	1–1	5–1	Friendly	
20	1 July 2000	Estadio Alejandro Morera Soto, Alajuela, Costa Rica	Panama	3–1	5–1	Friendly	
21	1 July 2000	Estadio Alejandro Morera Soto, Alajuela, Costa Rica	Panama	4–1	5–1	Friendly	
22	23 July 2000	Estadio Ricardo Saprissa Aymá, San Juan de Tibás, Costa Rica	United States	1–0	2–1	2002 FIFA World Cup qualification	
23	3 September 2000	Estadio Ricardo Saprissa Aymá, San Juan de Tibás, Costa Rica	Barbados	2–0	3–0	2002 FIFA World Cup qualification	
24	15 November 2000	Estadio Carlos Salazar Hijo, Mazatenango, Guatemala	Guatemala	1–1	1–2	2002 FIFA World Cup qualification	
25	6 June 2001	Miami Orange Bowl, Miami, United States	Guatemala	2–1	5–2	2002 FIFA World Cup qualification	
26	6 June 2001	Miami Orange Bowl, Miami, United States	Guatemala	4–1	5–2	2002 FIFA World Cup qualification	
27	28 February 2001	Estadio Ricardo Saprissa Aymá, San Juan de Tibás, Costa Rica	Honduras	1–1	2–2	2002 FIFA World Cup qualification	
28	18 April 2001	Estadio Alejandro Morera Soto, Alajuela, Costa Rica	Venezuela	1–0	2–2	Friendly	
29	23 May 2001	Estadio Olímpico Metropolitano, San Pedro Sula, Honduras	Belize	1–0	4–0	2001 UNCAF Nations Cup	
30	23 May 2001	Estadio Olímpico Metropolitano, San Pedro Sula, Honduras	Belize	2–0	4–0	2001 UNCAF Nations Cup	
31	23 May 2001	Estadio Olímpico Metropolitano, San Pedro Sula, Honduras	Belize	4–0	4–0	2001 UNCAF Nations Cup	
32	16 June 2001	Estadio Azteca, Mexico City, Mexico	Mexico	1–1	2–1	2002 FIFA World Cup qualification	
33	1 July 2001	Estadio Nacional Chelato Uclés, Tegucigalpa, Honduras	Honduras	2–0	3–2	2002 FIFA World Cup qualification	
34	19 July 2001	Estadio Atanasio Girardot, Medellín, Colombia	Bolivia	4–0	4–0	2001 Copa América	
35	5 September 2001	Estadio Ricardo Saprissa Aymá, San Juan de Tibás, Costa Rica	United States	1–0	2–0	2002 FIFA World Cup qualification	
36	5 September 2001	Estadio Ricardo Saprissa Aymá, San Juan de Tibás, Costa Rica	United States	2–0	2–0	2002 FIFA World Cup qualification	
37	17 January 2002	Miami Orange Bowl, Miami, United States	Martinique	2–0	2–0	2002 CONCACAF Gold Cup	
38	19 January 2002	Miami Orange Bowl, Miami, United States	Trinidad and Tobago	1–0	1–1	2002 CONCACAF Gold Cup	
39	8 June 2003	Estadio Ricardo Saprissa Aymá, San Juan de Tibás, Costa Rica	Chile	1–0	1–0	Friendly	
40	26 July 2003	Miami Orange Bowl, Miami, United States	United States	1–0	2–3	2003 CONCACAF Gold Cup	
41	26 July 2003	Miami Orange Bowl, Miami, United States	United States	2–1	2–3	2003 CONCACAF Gold Cup	
42	9 October 2004	Estadio Ricardo Saprissa Aymá, San Juan de Tibás, Costa Rica	Guatemala	5–0	5–0	2006 FIFA World Cup qualification	
43	4 February 2007	Estadio Alejandro Morera Soto, Alajuela, Costa Rica	Trinidad and Tobago	4–0	4–0	Friendly	
44	9 February 2007	Estadio Cuscatlán, San Salvador, El Salvador	Honduras	1–0	3–1	2007 CONCACAF Gold Cup	
45	9 February 2007	Estadio Cuscatlán, San Salvador, El Salvador	Honduras	3–1	3–1	2007 CONCACAF Gold Cup	
46	16 February 2007	Estadio Cuscatlán, San Salvador, El Salvador	El Salvador	2–0	2–0	2007 CONCACAF Gold Cup	
47	28 March 2007	Estadio Fiscal de Talca, Talca, Chile	Chile	1–1	1–1	Friendly	

== Honours ==
Saprissa

- Liga FPD
  - Winner: 1989, 1993–94, 1994–95
  - Runner-up: 1991, 1992
- CONCACAF Champions' Cup
  - Winner: 1993, 1995

Alajuelense

- Liga FPD
  - Winner: 1996–97, 2004–05
- CONCACAF Champions' Cup: 2004
- UNCAF Interclub Cup: 2002, 2005

Comunicaciones

- Liga Nacional de Guatemala: 1998–99, 1999–00 Apertura, Apertura 2008, Apertura 2010–2011
- UNCAF Interclub Cup: 2003

Costa Rica

- CONCACAF Gold Cup runner-up: 2002
- Copa Centroamericana
  - Winner: 1997, 1999, 2003, 2007
  - Runner-up: 1993, 2001

Individual

- UNCAF Nations Cup All-star team: 1997

== See also ==
- List of top international men's football goalscorers by country
- List of men's footballers with 100 or more international caps
