= Samuel Caballero =

Honduran footballer (born 1974)

Personal information
- Full name: Jorge Samuel Caballero Álvarez
- Date of birth: 24 December 1974 (age 51)
- Place of birth: Puerto Lempira, Honduras
- Height: 1.84 m (6 ft 1/2 in)
- Position: Defender

Senior career*
Years	Team	Apps	(Gls)
1991–1994	Deportivo Melgar		
1994–2001	Olimpia	66	(11)
2001–2004	Udinese	25	(2)
2004	Salernitana	0	(0)
2004	Defensor	0	(0)
2005	Chicago Fire	17	(1)
2006–2010	Changchun Yatai	110	(11)
2011	Necaxa	0	(0)

International career^{‡}
2008	Honduras U-23	3	(0)
1998–2009	Honduras	71	(11)
- * Club domestic league appearances and goals as of end of 2010 season ‡ National team caps and goals as of 2009-03-28

Jorge Samuel Caballero Álvarez (Latin American Spanish: [saˈmwel kaβaˈʝeɾo]; born 24 December 1974) is a retired Honduran football defender.

He currently is the president of Honduran national league club Deportes Savio.

== Club career ==
Caballero began his career with hometown club Deportivo Melgar. He then joined Olimpia, playing with the team from 1996 until transferring overseas in 2001. The central defender moved to Serie A to play for Udinese, where his second season was hampered by a long knee injury lay-off. He would remain in Udine until moving to Salernitana in 2004. He only played in 2 cup games for them and then signed for Nacional in Uruguay, but the move did not materialise since Nacional had too many foreigners in their squad, so he joined Defensor Sporting instead. In Uruguay he was unlucky with injuries again.

At the start of 2005, he moved to Major League Soccer and the Chicago Fire. Caballero had a disappointing 2005 with the club, and was released. He spent the 2006 preseason with the Colorado Rapids.

=== China ===
Caballero had a lengthy spell with Chinese side Changchun Yatai and played in the 2008 AFC Champions League with them. In the 2008-2009 Winter Market it was reported that two teams from Honduras, Marathon and Olimpia, were interested in the signing of Samuel Caballero after he publicly stated his desire to return to Honduras in order to be close to family and return to the National Team. However, the player still had a contract with the Chinese Club Changchun Yatai and stated that if he did not receive any offers he would return to the club and complete his contract.

=== Career end controversy ===
In summer 2011 he finally returned to Honduras to sign with Necaxa and declared the team would be his final before retiring. However, he would never play for the club since he was still contracted to Changchun Yatai and they did not give him permission to play for Necaxa.

== International career ==
Caballero has played an important part at the national team setup for over 10 years, mostly playing alongside other Honduran greats like Amado Guevara, Julio César de León and Carlos Pavón. He made his debut for Honduras in a January 1998 friendly match against Costa Rica and has earned a total of 71 caps, scoring 11 goals. He has represented his country in 22 FIFA World Cup qualification matches and played at the 1999 UNCAF Nations Cup as well as at the 1998, 2000, 2005 and 2007 CONCACAF Gold Cups. Also, he played at the 2001 Copa América. and was one of three of Honduras' over-age players at the 2008 Summer Olympics.

His final international was a March 2009 FIFA World Cup qualification match against Trinidad & Tobago.

=== International goals ===
Scores and results list Honduras' goal tally first.

N.	Date	Venue	Opponent	Score	Result	Competition
1.	19 March 1999	Estadio Nacional, San José, Costa Rica	Belize	1–0	5-1	1999 UNCAF Nations Cup
2.	16 December 1999	Estadio Olímpico Metropolitano, San Pedro Sula, Honduras	Zambia	2–0	7-1	Friendly match
3.	16 December 1999	Estadio Olímpico Metropolitano, San Pedro Sula, Honduras	Zambia	7–1	7-1	Friendly match
4.	14 February 2000	Miami Orange Bowl, Miami, United States	Jamaica	2–0	2–0	2000 CONCACAF Gold Cup
5.	3 June 2000	Estadio Francisco Morazán, San Pedro Sula, Honduras	Haiti	4–0	4–0	2002 FIFA World Cup qualification
6.	17 June 2000	Stade Sylvio Cator, Port-au-Prince, Haiti	Haiti	1–0	3–1	2002 FIFA World Cup qualification
7.	16 July 2000	Estadio Cuscatlán, San Salvador, El Salvador	El Salvador	1–1	5–2	2002 FIFA World Cup qualification
8.	2 September 2000	Estadio Francisco Morazán, San Pedro Sula, Honduras	El Salvador	5–0	5-0	2002 FIFA World Cup qualification
9.	15 November 2000	Arnos Vale Stadium, Kingstown, Saint Vincent and the Grenadines	Saint Vincent and the Grenadines	6–0	7–0	2002 FIFA World Cup qualification
10.	25 April 2001	National Stadium, Kingston, Jamaica	Jamaica	2–0	2-0	2002 FIFA World Cup qualification
11.	12 July 2005	Miami Orange Bowl, Miami, United States	Panama	1–0	1-0	2005 CONCACAF Gold Cup

== Retirement ==
In October 2011, Caballero was named president of Deportes Savio.

== Honours ==
C.D. Olimpia

- Liga Nacional de Fútbol de Honduras: 2000–01

Nacional

- Uruguayan Primera División: 2004 Apertura

Changchun Yatai

- Chinese Super League: Champion 2007
- Chinese Super League: Runner-Up 2009
- Chinese Super League: Footballer of the Year (MVP)

Individual

- CONCACAF Gold Cup Best XI: 2005
- CONCACAF Gold Cup All-Tournament team (Honorable Mention): 2007
