= Carlos Salazar Hijo Stadium =

Stadium in Mazatenango, Guatemala

Estadio Carlos Salazar Hijo
- Coloso de Santa Cristina
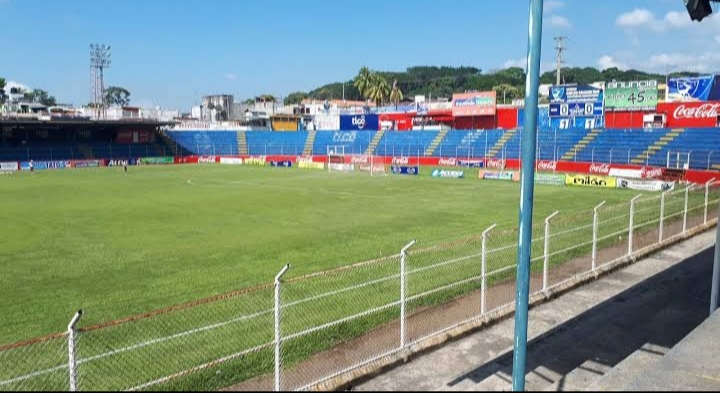
- Interactive map of Estadio Carlos Salazar Hijo
- Location: Mazatenango, Guatemala
- Coordinates: 14°31′54″N 91°30′33″W
- Owner: Suchitepéquez
- Capacity: 10,000
- Surface: Grass
- Field size: 104 m × 74 m (341 ft × 243 ft)

Construction
- Groundbreaking: 1965
- Opened: November 24, 1966
- Cost: Q. 8,000,000

Tenants
- Suchitepéquez (1966–present); Comunicaciones (2023); Guatemala national football team (selected matches)

The Carlos Salazar Hijo Stadium (Spanish: Estadio Carlos Salazar Hijo) is a football stadium in Mazatenango, Guatemala, home to one of the most traditional first division clubs in the country, Suchitepéquez. It has a capacity of 10,000 (formerly 12,000) and it is situated in the neighbourhood of Santa Cristina.

== History ==
The stadium was opened on 24 November 1966 and its cost was Q. 8,000,000. It was named after Carlos Salazar Jr. a local sports commentator who organized a radiothon to fund its construction. It was the first stadium in the country, outside of Guatemala City, to have lighting.

On 2 October 1983 Deportivo Suchitepéquez won the national league title at the stadium by beating Antigua GFC 4–1.

In 2000 it was approved by FIFA to host World Cup qualification matches. The Guatemala national team played its first official game at the stadium on 16 July 2000 against the United States during the semifinal round of the 2002 World Cup qualifying. Later that year, Guatemala's last match of the round was played at the Carlos Salazar, where the host team beat Costa Rica 2-1 and forced a playoff between the two teams.

In 2007 it hosted one of the two national league final matches, between Suchitepéquez and C.D. Jalapa.

== See also ==
- Lists of stadiums
