= Earnie Stewart =

Soccer player (born 1969)

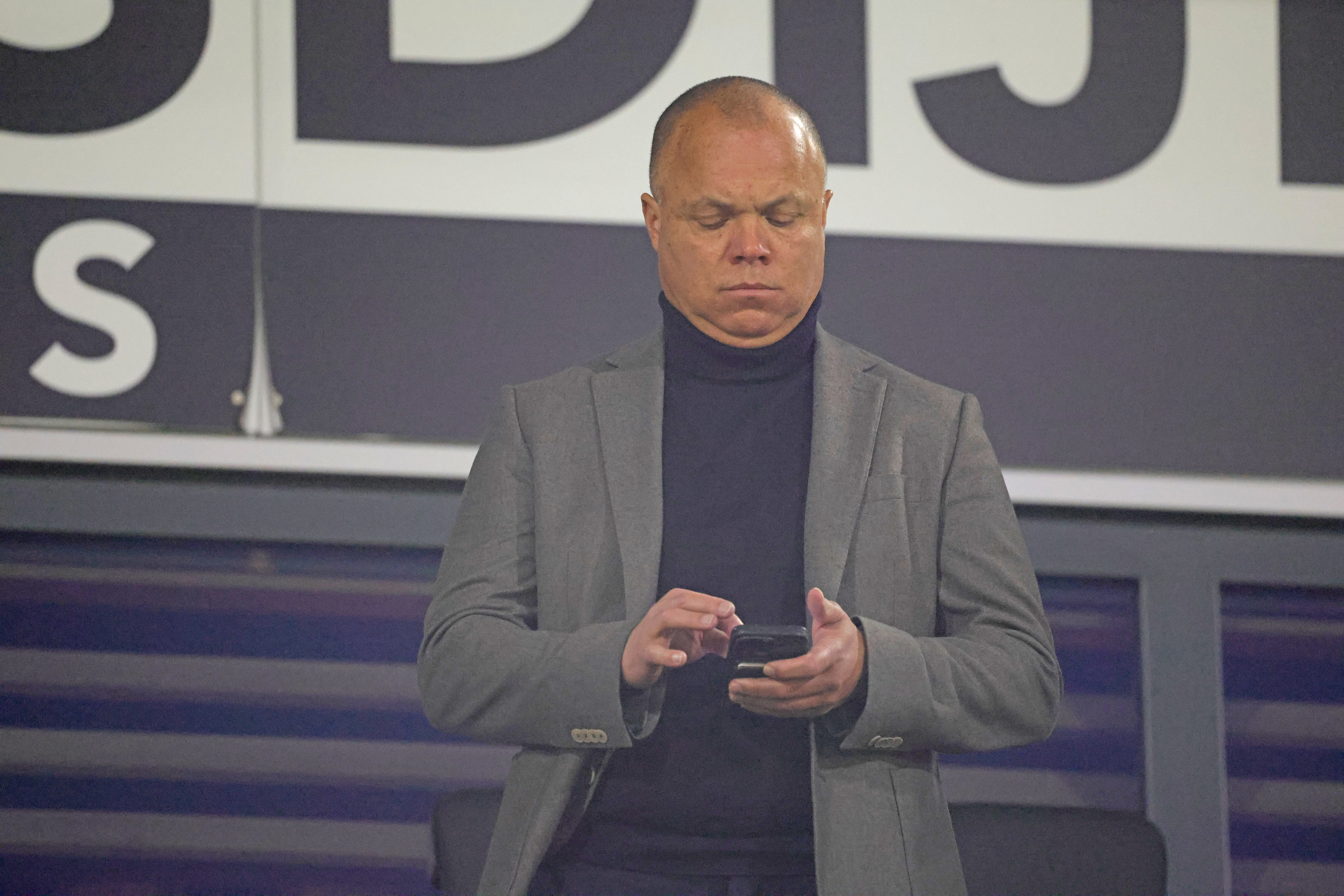
- Stewart in 2026

Personal information
- Full name: Earnest Lee Stewart Jr.
- Date of birth: March 28, 1969 (age 57)
- Place of birth: Veghel, Netherlands
- Height: 5 ft 9 in (1.75 m)
- Positions: Forward; midfielder

Team information
- Current team: PSV Eindhoven (director of football)

Youth career
- 1980–1987: UDI '19
- 1987–1988: VVV-Venlo

Senior career*
Years	Team	Apps	(Gls)
1988–1990	VVV-Venlo	62	(15)
1990–1996	Willem II	170	(49)
1996–2002	NAC Breda	189	(50)
2003–2004	D.C. United	47	(4)
2005	VVV-Venlo	6	(1)
Total		474	(119)

International career
1990–2004	United States	101	(17)
Medal record
Representing United States
Men's soccer
Third place	CONCACAF Gold Cup	2003
- * Club domestic league appearances and goals

Earnest Lee Stewart Jr., better known as Earnie Stewart (born March 28, 1969) is a former professional soccer player who played as a forward or midfielder. Born in the Netherlands, he represented the United States national team. His career spanned 17 years from 1988 until his retirement in 2005, with the majority of the years spent in the Netherlands, except for a period he played for D.C. United. Stewart also represented the United States in international soccer.

Since his retirement from professional soccer, Stewart has served as a soccer executive in various positions for multiple organizations. He is currently the director of football for PSV Eindhoven.

In 2011, Stewart was inducted into the National Soccer Hall of Fame.

== Early life and education ==
Earnie Stewart is the son of U.S. Air Force airman Earnie Stewart Sr. and his wife Annemien. Stewart grew up in Uden, Netherlands.

== Playing career ==
Stewart began his professional career in the Netherlands in 1988 with VVV-Venlo. By the end of 1990, he made his first appearance for the United States national team against Portugal.

In his first season at Willem II, he finished third on the goal-scoring list for the Dutch First Division with 17. He went on to score 49 goals in six seasons there. In the meantime, he became a regular for the United States national team, starting all four games that the United States played in the 1994 FIFA World Cup. Most notably, he scored the goal that gave the United States its winning margin against Colombia in the group stage, the first World Cup game won by the United States since 1950.

By 1996, Stewart had moved to NAC Breda, eventually spending more than six seasons there. NAC was relegated in 1999, but Stewart helped the club win the First Division in 2000, thereby earning promotion back to the Eredivisie. During his years at NAC, he also played in all of the United States team's matches at the 1998 and 2002 FIFA World Cups, becoming one of only five American men to play at three World Cups.

In January 2003, he left the Netherlands to play in Major League Soccer, and was allocated to D.C. United, where he won the MLS Cup in his second season. His scoring numbers did not equal his earlier high standards, as he tallied just four regular season goals and one playoff goal in MLS. He left D.C. after the 2004 season, coming back to the Netherlands and his original club, VVV-Venlo, where he became technical director following his retirement in 2005.

Stewart became the eighth American man to make his 100th international appearance in a 2004 World Cup qualifier against Grenada. His 111 goals as a professional in the Netherlands makes him the highest-scoring American in international club play. He was named U.S. Soccer Athlete of the Year in 2001.

== Post-playing career ==
On May 14, 2006, Earnie Stewart was named technical director of NAC Breda.

He was appointed as AZ Alkmaar's director of football affairs in June 2010. The 41-year-old succeeded Marcel Brands, who left AZ for PSV. Stewart left his post as technical director at NAC Breda by mutual consent.

One of Stewart's long-term goals was to return to the United States as a soccer executive: "One ambition I do have is to go back to the United States and to be of importance to soccer."

Stewart accomplished that goal on October 26, 2015, when the Philadelphia Union officially announced that Stewart would take on the role of sporting director for the club.

On June 6, 2018, Stewart was named general manager of the United States men's national team.

On August 12, 2019, Stewart was promoted to the position of sporting director of the United States Soccer Federation.

On January 26, 2023, the U.S. Soccer Federation announced that Stewart would be departing and would be joining PSV as the new technical director for the club. Stewart remained with U.S. Soccer until February 15, 2023, to assist with a smooth transition to the next sporting director.

Stewart commenced his role at PSV on March 1, 2023. In his first months, he appointed Peter Bosz as the club's new manager whilst signing various players, including Americans Ricardo Pepi, Malik Tillman and Sergiño Dest. During his tenure, PSV returned to the top of the Eredivisie after a six-year championship drought, winning three consecutive titles between 2023–24 and 2025–26. On September 3, 2026, Stewart extended his contract with PSV through the 2029–30 season.

== Career statistics ==
=== Club ===
As of March 29, 2017

Appearances and goals by club, season and competition
Club	Season	League			National cup		League cup		Continental		Total	
Club	Season	Division	Apps	Goals	Apps	Goals	Apps	Goals	Apps	Goals	Apps	Goals
VVV-Venlo	1988–89	Eredivisie	27	3								
VVV-Venlo	1989–90	Eerste Divisie	35	12								
VVV-Venlo	Total		62	15								
Willem II	1990–91	Eredivisie	33	17								
Willem II	1991–92	Eredivisie	33	8								
Willem II	1992–93	Eredivisie	22	4								
Willem II	1993–94	Eredivisie	32	7								
Willem II	1994–95	Eredivisie	32	10								
Willem II	1995–96	Eredivisie	18	3								
Willem II	Total		170	49								
NAC Breda	1996–97	Eredivisie	28	9								
NAC Breda	1997–98	Eredivisie	30	6								
NAC Breda	1998–99	Eredivisie	28	7								
NAC Breda	1999–2000	Eerste Divisie	29	8								
NAC Breda	2000–01	Eredivisie	28	8								
NAC Breda	2001–02	Eredivisie	31	10								
NAC Breda	2002–03	Eredivisie	15	2								
NAC Breda	Total		189	50								
D.C. United	2003	Major League Soccer	21	1								
D.C. United	2004	Major League Soccer	26	3								
D.C. United	Total		47	4								
VVV-Venlo	2004–05	Eerste Divisie	6	1								
Career total			474	119								

=== International ===
As of March 29, 2017

Appearances and goals by national team and year
National team	Year	Apps	Goals
United States	1990	1	0
United States	1991	0	0
United States	1992	7	0
United States	1993	6	2
United States	1994	7	1
United States	1995	9	1
United States	1996	5	0
United States	1997	7	1
United States	1998	9	1
United States	1999	5	0
United States	2000	8	4
United States	2001	10	5
United States	2002	10	0
United States	2003	13	2
United States	2004	4	0
Total		101	17

As of August 18, 2004

Scores and results list the United States' goal tally first, score column indicates score after each Stewart goal.

List of international goals scored by Earnie Stewart
No.	Date	Venue	Opponent	Score	Result	Competition
1	June 13, 1993	Soldier Field, Chicago, Illinois, United States	Germany	2–4	3–4	Friendly
2	August 31, 1993	Laugardalsvöllur, Reykjavík, Iceland	Iceland	1–0	1–0	Friendly
3	June 22, 1994	Rose Bowl, Pasadena, California, United States	Colombia	2–0	2–1	1994 FIFA World Cup
4	March 25, 1995	Cotton Bowl, Dallas, Texas, United States	Uruguay	2–0	2–2	Friendly
5	March 16, 1997	Stanford Stadium, Palo Alto, California, United States	Canada	3–0	3–0	1998 FIFA World Cup Qualifying
6	May 24, 1998	Providence Park, Portland, Oregon, United States	Kuwait	1–0	2–0	Friendly
7	June 3, 2000	Robert F. Kennedy Memorial Stadium, Washington, D.C., United States	South Africa	4–0	4–0	Friendly
8	July 23, 2000	Estadio Ricardo Saprissa Aymá, San José, Costa Rica	Costa Rica	1–1	1–2	2002 FIFA World Cup qualification
9	August 16, 2000	Foxboro Stadium, Foxborough, Massachusetts, United States	Barbados	6–0	7–0	2002 FIFA World Cup qualification
10	November 15, 2000	Barbados National Stadium, St. Michael, Barbados	Barbados	2–0	4–0	2002 FIFA World Cup qualification
11	February 28, 2001	Columbus Crew Stadium, Columbus, Ohio, United States	Mexico	2–0	2–0	2002 FIFA World Cup qualification
12	March 28, 2001	Estadio Olímpico Metropolitano, San Pedro Sula, Honduras	Honduras	1–0	2–1	2002 FIFA World Cup qualification
13	June 20, 2001	Foxboro Stadium, Foxborough, Massachusetts, United States	Trinidad and Tobago	2–0	2–0	2002 FIFA World Cup qualification
14	September 1, 2001	Robert F. Kennedy Memorial Stadium, Washington, D.C., United States	Honduras	1–0	2–3	2002 FIFA World Cup qualification
15	September 1, 2001	Robert F. Kennedy Memorial Stadium, Washington, D.C., United States	Honduras	2–3	2–3	2002 FIFA World Cup qualification
16	July 6, 2003	Columbus Crew Stadium, Columbus, Ohio, United States	Paraguay	2–0	2–0	Friendly
17	July 26, 2003	Miami Orange Bowl, Miami, Florida, United States	Costa Rica	2–2	3–2	2003 CONCACAF Gold Cup

== See also ==
- List of United States men's international soccer players born outside the United States
- List of men's footballers with 100 or more international caps
