= Mazatenango, Suchitepéquez =

Mazatenango
- Municipality
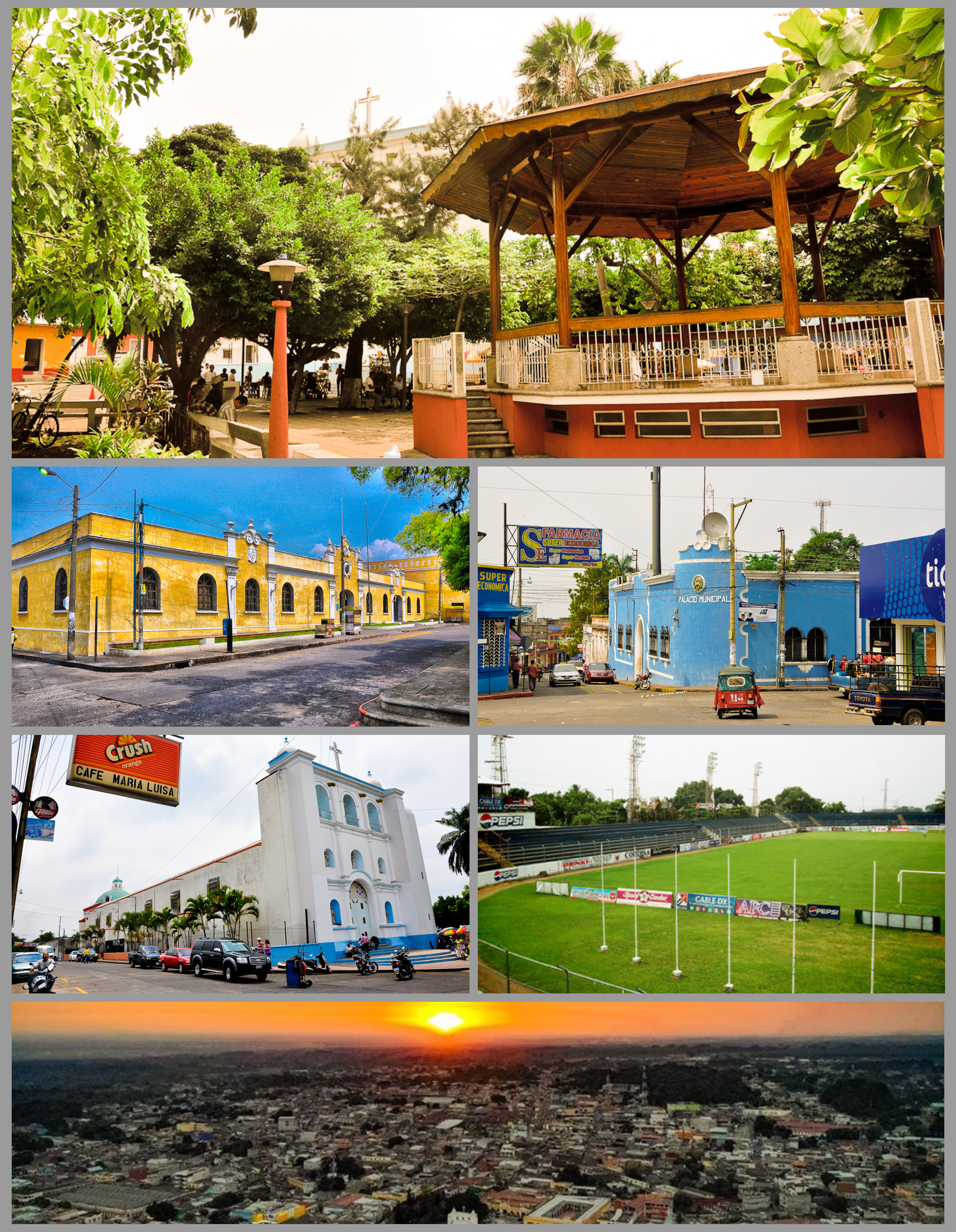
- From the top: Kiosk in the park, Streets in Mazatenango, Municipal Palace, Church, Stadium and Panoramic view at sunset.

- Location in Guatemala
- Coordinates: 14°32′N 91°30′W
- Country: Guatemala
- Department: Suchitepéquez

Government
  - Mayor: Manuel Delgado

Area
  - Municipality: 86 sq mi (223 km^{2})
- Elevation: 1,227 ft (374 m)

Population (2018 census)
  - Municipality: 77,431
  - Density: 899/sq mi (347/km^{2})
  - Urban: 77,431
- Climate: Am

Mazatenango is a city with a population of 77,431 (as of 2018) and a municipality in the Suchitepéquez department of Guatemala. It is the capital of Suchitepéquez department, and is located 165 km from Guatemala City.

It lies significantly lower in elevation than Guatemala City or Quetzaltenango, as it sits on the coastal plain leading to the Pacific Ocean. The climate is hotter and more humid than that of the other cities in higher elevations..

== Carnival ==
During the month of February, an eight-day Carnival Feast takes place in the city, with food, music, parades, and games.

== Arts and crafts ==
Mazatenango is a major producer of gold, silver, tile, fabric, and furniture. It's also a major commercial centre for the economy. This region provides many of the products tourists buy at the markets. Goods are shipped to other cities via the Pacific Coast Highway which runs through the city.

== Sports ==
Mazatenango is home to Guatemala's top division football side CD Suchitepéquez. The team plays its home fixtures at Estadio Carlos Salazar Hijo in the Santa Cristina neighborhood.

== Language ==
Spanish and Kich’e are spoken in Mazatenango.

== Notable people ==
- Óscar Santis, professional footballer
