= 2002 CONCACAF Gold Cup squads =

These are the squads for the 2002 CONCACAF Gold Cup.

== Group A ==
=== El Salvador ===
Head coach: (El Salvador) Carlos Recinos

No.	Pos.	Player	Date of birth (age)	Caps	Club
1	GK	Santos Rivera	8 April 1974 (aged 27)	28 (0)	(El Salvador) Municipal Limeño
2	DF	William Osorio	13 April 1971 (aged 30)	41 (0)	(El Salvador) FAS
4	DF	Marvin Benítez	14 August 1974 (aged 27)	5 (0)	(El Salvador) Municipal Limeño
5	DF	Víctor Velásquez	12 April 1976 (aged 25)	12 (3)	(El Salvador) FAS
6	DF	Jaime Cubías	10 March 1974 (aged 27)	24 (0)	(El Salvador) Isidro Metapán
7	MF	Héctor Canjura	15 July 1976 (aged 25)	14 (7)	(El Salvador) Luis Ángel Firpo
8	MF	Santos Cabrera	1 November 1976 (aged 25)	16 (8)	(El Salvador) Luis Ángel Firpo
9	MF	Josué Galdámez	18 December 1982 (aged 19)	7 (0)	(El Salvador) Municipal Limeño
11	FW	Ronald Cerritos	3 January 1975 (aged 27)	48 (0)	(United States) Dallas Burn
12	MF	Cristian Álvarez	19 April 1978 (aged 23)	8 (0)	(El Salvador) FAS
13	MF	Deris Umanzor	7 January 1980 (aged 22)	10 (1)	(El Salvador) Municipal Limeño
14	FW	Rudis Corrales	6 November 1979 (aged 22)	8 (8)	(El Salvador) Municipal Limeño
16	MF	Adonai Martínez	3 October 1975 (aged 26)	8 (0)	(El Salvador) Alianza
17	MF	Jorge Rodríguez	20 May 1971 (aged 30)	50 (0)	(United States) Dallas Burn
18	MF	Óscar Navarro	13 January 1979 (aged 23)	0 (0)	(El Salvador) Alianza
19	DF	Elmer Martínez	3 January 1975 (aged 27)	20 (0)	(El Salvador) Municipal Limeño
20	DF	Guillermo García	4 August 1969 (aged 32)	32 (1)	(El Salvador) Luis Ángel Firpo
22	GK	Juan José Gómez	8 November 1980 (aged 21)	19 (0)	(El Salvador) Águila

=== Guatemala ===
Head coach: (Uruguay) Julio César Cortés

No.	Pos.	Player	Date of birth (age)	Caps	Club
1	GK	Edgar Estrada	16 November 1967 (aged 34)	71 (0)	(Guatemala) Municipal
2	DF	Denis Chen	9 August 1977 (aged 24)	9 (1)	(Guatemala) Municipal
3	DF	Pablo Melgar	14 January 1980 (aged 22)	0 (0)	(Guatemala) Antigua
4	DF	Luis Swisher	21 June 1978 (aged 23)	23 (0)	(Guatemala) Comunicaciones
5	DF	Gustavo Cabrera	13 December 1979 (aged 22)	16 (0)	(Guatemala) Comunicaciones
6	DF	Alvaro Jiménez	24 November 1974 (aged 27)	9 (0)	(Guatemala) Comunicaciones
7	DF	Fabricio Benitez	11 June 1975 (aged 26)	12 (0)	(Guatemala) Cobán Imperial
8	MF	Gonzalo Romero	25 March 1975 (aged 26)	9 (0)	(Guatemala) Municipal
9	FW	Mario Acevedo	15 February 1969 (aged 32)	26 (3)	(Guatemala) Municipal
10	MF	Freddy García	12 January 1977 (aged 25)	38 (15)	(Guatemala) Comunicaciones
11	FW	Guillermo Ramírez	26 March 1978 (aged 23)	33 (4)	(Greece) PAS Giannina
14	MF	Claudio Albizuris	1 July 1981 (aged 20)	2 (0)	(Guatemala) Municipal
15	FW	Juan Carlos Plata	1 January 1971 (aged 31)	55 (25)	(Guatemala) Municipal
18	DF	Uwaldo Pérez	25 October 1979 (aged 22)	14 (1)	(Guatemala) Comunicaciones
19	MF	Fredy Thompson	2 June 1982 (aged 19)	7 (0)	(Guatemala) Comunicaciones
20	FW	Carlos Ruíz	15 September 1979 (aged 22)	28 (11)	(Guatemala) Municipal
21	MF	Omar Pivaral	2 April 1975 (aged 26)	0 (0)	(Guatemala) Municipal
22	GK	Danny Ortiz	26 July 1976 (aged 25)	8 (0)	(Guatemala) Comunicaciones
23	DF	Israel Donis	11 August 1975 (aged 26)	7 (0)	(Guatemala) Municipal

=== Mexico ===
Head coach: (Mexico) Javier Aguirre

No.	Pos.	Player	Date of birth (age)	Caps	Club
1	GK	Adrián Martínez	1 January 1970 (aged 32)	2 (0)	(Mexico) Santos Laguna
2	DF	Adrián García Arias	6 December 1975 (aged 26)	0 (0)	(Mexico) Deportivo Toluca
3	DF	Sindey Balderas	20 June 1975 (aged 26)	0 (0)	(Mexico) Tigres UANL
4	DF	Ignacio Hierro	22 June 1978 (aged 23)	9 (0)	(Mexico) Atlante
5	DF	Francisco Gabriel de Anda	5 June 1971 (aged 30)	9 (1)	(Mexico) Pachuca
6	MF	Alfonso Sosa (Captain)	5 October 1967 (aged 34)	9 (0)	(Mexico) Pachuca
7	DF	Víctor Gutiérrez	27 January 1978 (aged 23)	1 (0)	(Mexico) Cruz Azul
8	MF	Tomás Campos	14 September 1975 (aged 26)	4 (1)	(Mexico) Cruz Azul
9	FW	Carlos Ochoa	5 March 1978 (aged 23)	0 (0)	(Mexico) Tigres UANL
10	MF	Marco Garcés	7 November 1972 (aged 29)	0 (0)	(Mexico) Pachuca
11	FW	Antonio de Nigris	1 April 1978 (aged 23)	15 (4)	(Mexico) Monterrey
12	GK	Omar Ortíz	13 March 1976 (aged 25)	0 (0)	(Mexico) Celaya
13	MF	Antonio Sancho	14 March 1976 (aged 25)	1 (0)	(Mexico) Tigres UANL
14	FW	Jair García	25 October 1978 (aged 23)	1 (0)	(Mexico) Guadalajara
15	MF	José Antonio Noriega	29 December 1969 (aged 32)	3 (0)	(Mexico) Monarcas Morelia
16	MF	Joaquín Reyes	20 February 1978 (aged 23)	3 (0)	(Mexico) Santos Laguna
17	MF	Erik Espinosa	13 January 1980 (aged 22)	0 (0)	(Mexico) Deportivo Toluca
18	FW	Adolfo Bautista	15 May 1979 (aged 22)	0 (0)	(Mexico) Tecos UAG

== Group B ==
=== Cuba ===
Head coach: (Peru) Miguel Company

No.	Pos.	Player	Date of birth (age)	Caps	Club
1	GK	Odelín Molina	3 August 1974 (aged 27)	18 (0)	(Cuba) Villa Clara
2	DF	Alexander Driggs	18 October 1973 (aged 28)	22 (0)	(Cuba) Holguín
3	DF	Yénier Márquez	3 January 1979 (aged 23)	23 (2)	(Cuba) Villa Clara
4	DF	Mario Rodríguez López	20 September 1977 (aged 24)	17 (0)	(Cuba) Ciudad de La Habana
5	DF	Alexander Cruzata	26 July 1977 (aged 24)	30 (1)	(Cuba) Holguín
6	DF	Mario Pedraza	18 July 1973 (aged 28)	15 (0)	(Cuba) Cienfuegos
7	MF	Raciel Torres	1 March 1981 (aged 20)	0 (0)	(Cuba) Ciudad de La Habana
8	MF	Miguel Ángel Gandara	31 January 1975 (aged 26)	24 (2)	(Cuba) Ciudad de La Habana
9	FW	Lázaro Darcourt	25 April 1971 (aged 30)	41 (5)	(Cuba) Pinar del Río
10	FW	Alberto Delgado	3 November 1978 (aged 23)	20 (4)	(Cuba) Ciudad de La Habana
11	FW	Ariel Betancourt	30 September 1970 (aged 31)	11 (0)	(Cuba) Villa Clara
12	GK	Alexis Revé	17 November 1972 (aged 29)	3 (0)	(Cuba) Villa Clara
13	DF	Silvio Pedro Miñoso	23 December 1976 (aged 25)	0 (0)	(Cuba) Villa Clara
14	MF	Jorge Luis Ramírez	10 July 1977 (aged 24)	0 (0)	(Cuba) Granma
17	MF	Liván Pérez	1 January 1977 (aged 25)	8 (0)	(Cuba) Ciego de Ávila
18	FW	Rey Ángel Martínez	13 May 1980 (aged 21)	15 (2)	(Cuba) Ciudad de La Habana
19	FW	Maykel Galindo	28 January 1981 (aged 20)	0 (0)	(Cuba) Villa Clara
22	MF	René Estrada	1 January 1978 (aged 24)	2 (0)	(Cuba) Industriales

=== South Korea ===
Head coach: (Netherlands) Guus Hiddink

No.	Pos.	Player	Date of birth (age)	Caps	Club
1	GK	Kim Byung-Ji	8 April 1970 (aged 31)		(South Korea) Pohang Steelers
3	MF	Hyun Young-Min	25 December 1979 (aged 22)		(South Korea) Konkuk University
4	DF	Kim Tae-Young	8 November 1970 (aged 31)		(South Korea) Chunnam Dragons
5	MF	Kim Nam-Il	14 March 1977 (aged 24)		(South Korea) Chunnam Dragons
7	DF	Song Chong-Gug	20 February 1979 (aged 22)		(South Korea) Busan I'Park
8	FW	Kim Do-Hoon	21 July 1970 (aged 31)		(South Korea) Jeonbuk Hyundai Motors
9	FW	Choi Yong-Soo	10 September 1973 (aged 28)		(Japan) JEF United
10	FW	Hwang Sun-Hong	14 July 1968 (aged 33)		(Japan) Kashiwa Reysol
11	MF	Lee Chun-Soo	9 July 1981 (aged 20)		(South Korea) Ulsan Hyundai Horangi
12	GK	Lee Woon-Jae	26 April 1973 (aged 28)		(South Korea) Sangmu
13	MF	Lee Eul-Yong	8 August 1975 (aged 26)		(South Korea) Bucheon
15	DF	Choi Jin-Cheul	26 March 1971 (aged 30)		(South Korea) Jeonbuk Hyundai Motors
16	MF	Park Ji-Sung	25 February 1981 (aged 20)		(Japan) Kyoto Sanga
17	DF	Lee Young-Pyo	23 April 1977 (aged 24)		(South Korea) Anyang LG Cheetahs
18	DF	Yoo Sang-Chul	18 October 1971 (aged 30)		(Japan) Kashiwa Reysol
20	FW	Cha Du-Ri	25 July 1980 (aged 21)		(South Korea) Korea University
21	FW	Ahn Hyo-Yeon	16 April 1978 (aged 23)		(Japan) Kyoto Sanga
24	DF	Kim Sang-Sik	17 December 1976 (aged 25)		(South Korea) Seongnam Ilhwa Chunma

=== United States ===
Head coach: (United States) Bruce Arena

No.	Pos.	Player	Date of birth (age)	Caps	Club
1	GK	Tony Meola	21 February 1969 (aged 32)	97 (0)	(United States) Kansas City Wizards
2	DF	Frankie Hejduk	5 August 1974 (aged 27)	30 (5)	(Germany) Bayer Leverkusen
4	MF	DaMarcus Beasley	24 May 1982 (aged 19)	3 (0)	(United States) Chicago Fire
7	MF	Eddie Lewis	17 May 1974 (aged 27)	29 (2)	(England) Fulham
8	MF	Richie Williams	3 June 1970 (aged 31)	17 (0)	(United States) MetroStars
11	FW	Ante Razov	2 March 1974 (aged 27)	19 (5)	(United States) Chicago Fire
12	DF	Jeff Agoos	2 May 1968 (aged 33)	117 (3)	(United States) San Jose Earthquakes
13	MF	Cobi Jones	16 June 1970 (aged 31)	144 (14)	(United States) Los Angeles Galaxy
14	MF	Chris Armas	27 August 1972 (aged 29)	35 (2)	(United States) Chicago Fire
15	FW	Josh Wolff	25 February 1977 (aged 24)	10 (3)	(United States) Chicago Fire
17	DF	Carlos Bocanegra	25 May 1979 (aged 22)	1 (0)	(United States) Chicago Fire
18	GK	Kasey Keller (c)	29 November 1969 (aged 32)	50 (0)	(England) Tottenham Hotspur
19	MF	Manny Lagos*	1 June 1971 (aged 30)	1 (0)	(United States) San Jose Earthquakes
20	FW	Brian McBride	19 June 1972 (aged 29)	50 (14)	(United States) Columbus Crew
21	FW	Landon Donovan	4 March 1982 (aged 19)	9 (1)	(United States) San Jose Earthquakes
25	MF	Pablo Mastroeni	26 August 1976 (aged 25)	2 (0)	(United States) Colorado Rapids
26	DF	Danny Califf	17 March 1980 (aged 21)	0 (0)	(United States) Los Angeles Galaxy
27	MF	Jeff Cunningham*	21 August 1976 (aged 25)	1 (0)	(United States) Columbus Crew

- Lagos and Cunningham were replaced after group matches by

No.	Pos.	Player	Date of birth (age)	Caps	Club
10	MF	Brian Maisonneuve	28 June 1973 (aged 28)	10 (0)	(United States) Columbus Crew
5	FW	Clint Mathis	25 November 1976 (aged 25)	11 (3)	(United States) MetroStars

== Group C ==
=== Costa Rica ===
Head coach: (Brazil) Alexandre Guimarães

No.	Pos.	Player	Date of birth (age)	Caps	Club
1	GK	Erick Lonnis	9 September 1965 (aged 36)	66 (0)	(Costa Rica) Deportivo Saprissa
2	DF	Jervis Drummond	8 September 1976 (aged 25)	36 (1)	(Costa Rica) Deportivo Saprissa
3	DF	Luis Marín	10 August 1974 (aged 27)	65 (3)	(Costa Rica) Alajuelense
4	MF	Max Sánchez	2 January 1973 (aged 29)	2 (0)	(Costa Rica) Santos de Guápiles
5	DF	Gilberto Martínez	1 October 1979 (aged 22)	18 (0)	(Costa Rica) Deportivo Saprissa
6	MF	Wilmer López	3 August 1971 (aged 30)	58 (6)	(Costa Rica) Alajuelense
7	FW	Rolando Fonseca	6 June 1974 (aged 27)	72 (36)	(Costa Rica) Alajuelense
8	DF	Mauricio Solís	13 December 1972 (aged 29)	75 (5)	(Costa Rica) Alajuelense
9	FW	Paulo Wanchope	31 July 1976 (aged 25)	44 (0)	(England) Manchester City
10	MF	Walter Centeno	10 June 1974 (aged 27)	40 (5)	(Costa Rica) Deportivo Saprissa
12	FW	Óscar Rojas	27 April 1979 (aged 22)	1 (0)	(Mexico) La Piedad
14	MF	Austin Berry	5 April 1971 (aged 30)	64 (6)	(Costa Rica) Herediano
15	DF	Harold Wallace	7 September 1975 (aged 26)	48 (1)	(Costa Rica) Alajuelense
16	MF	Steven Bryce	16 August 1977 (aged 24)	24 (4)	(Costa Rica) Alajuelense
17	FW	Hernán Medford	23 May 1968 (aged 33)	80 (17)	(Costa Rica) Deportivo Saprissa
18	GK	Álvaro Mesén	24 December 1972 (aged 29)	13 (0)	(Costa Rica) Alajuelense
20	FW	William Sunsing	12 May 1977 (aged 24)	17 (1)	(United States) New England Revolution
21	DF	Reynaldo Parks	4 December 1974 (aged 27)	41 (1)	(Mexico) Tecos UAG
22	DF	Carlos Castro	10 September 1978 (aged 23)	15 (0)	(Costa Rica) Alajuelense

=== Martinique ===
Head coach: (Martinique) Théodore Antonin

No.	Pos.	Player	Date of birth (age)	Caps	Club
1	GK	Jean-François Go	9 August 1973 (aged 28)		(Martinique) Case-Pilote
4	DF	Judes Vaton	17 April 1972 (aged 29)		(Martinique) Samaritaine
5	FW	Patrick Percin	18 December 1976 (aged 25)		(Martinique) Franciscain
6	DF	Paul-Henri Clorus	11 April 1974 (aged 27)		(Martinique) Franciscain
7	MF	Xavier Bullet	10 March 1979 (aged 22)		(Martinique) New Club
8	DF	David Dicanot	23 September 1973 (aged 28)		(France) RCF Paris
9	FW	Loïc Pupon	24 December 1977 (aged 24)		(Martinique) Golden Star
10	FW	José Goron	1 April 1977 (aged 24)		(Martinique) Case-Pilote
11	MF	Jean-Marie Agathine	24 March 1979 (aged 22)		(Martinique) New Club
12	DF	Ludovic Mirande	6 January 1977 (aged 25)		(Martinique) L'Assaut
14	MF	Marcel Gibon	22 May 1973 (aged 28)		(Martinique) Robert
15	DF	Laurent Lagrand	24 November 1974 (aged 27)		(Martinique) Aiglon
16	MF	Jean-Victor Lavril	24 August 1969 (aged 32)		(Martinique) Case-Pilote
17	DF	Pascal Lina	13 December 1970 (aged 31)		(Martinique) Franciscain
18	DF	Fabrice Reuperne	18 September 1975 (aged 26)		(France) Stade Reims
19	FW	Rodolphe Rano	16 April 1972 (aged 29)		(Martinique) New Club
20	FW	Thierry Fondelot	19 June 1970 (aged 31)		(Martinique) Golden Star
24	GK	Eddy Heurlié	27 December 1977 (aged 24)		(France) Troyes

=== Trinidad and Tobago ===
Head coach: (Brazil) Renê Simões

No.	Pos.	Player	Date of birth (age)	Caps	Club
1	GK	Shaka Hislop	22 February 1969 (aged 32)	11 (0)	(England) West Ham
3	MF	Dale Saunders	9 November 1973 (aged 28)	40 (5)	(Trinidad and Tobago) Joe Public
4	DF	Marvin Andrews	22 December 1975 (aged 26)	67 (0)	(Scotland) Livingston
5	DF	Brent Sancho	13 May 1977 (aged 24)	14 (0)	(United States) Portland Timbers
6	DF	Avery John	18 June 1975 (aged 26)	31 (0)	(Republic of Ireland) Bohemian
7	DF	Cyd Gray	21 November 1973 (aged 28)	6 (0)	(Trinidad and Tobago) Joe Public
8	MF	Angus Eve	23 February 1973 (aged 28)	44 (17)	(Trinidad and Tobago) San Juan Jabloteh
9	MF	Arnold Dwarika	23 February 1973 (aged 28)	118 (55)	(Trinidad and Tobago) Joe Public
10	MF	Reynold Carrington	27 January 1970 (aged 31)	50 (0)	(Trinidad and Tobago) W Connection
11	MF	Brent Rahim	8 August 1978 (aged 23)	23 (2)	(Bulgaria) Levski Sofia
12	FW	Collin Samuel	27 January 1981 (aged 20)	0 (0)	(Trinidad and Tobago) San Juan Jabloteh
13	DF	Ansil Elcock	17 May 1969 (aged 32)	108 (0)	(United States) Columbus Crew
14	FW	Stern John	30 October 1976 (aged 25)	42 (18)	(England) Nottingham Forest
15	DF	Stokely Mason	24 October 1975 (aged 26)	62 (3)	(Trinidad and Tobago) Joe Public
16	DF	Keyeno Thomas	29 December 1977 (aged 24)	17 (0)	(Trinidad and Tobago) Joe Public
17	MF	Aurtis Whitley	1 May 1977 (aged 24)	3 (0)	(Trinidad and Tobago) San Juan Jabloteh
18	FW	Nigel Pierre	6 February 1979 (aged 22)	30 (15)	(Trinidad and Tobago) Joe Public
22	GK	Clayton Ince	12 February 1972 (aged 29)	61 (0)	(England) Crewe Alexandra

== Group D ==
=== Canada ===
Head coach: (Germany) Holger Osieck

No.	Pos.	Player	Date of birth (age)	Caps	Club
1	GK	Lars Hirschfeld	17 October 1978 (aged 23)	2 (0)	(Canada) Calgary Storm
3	DF	Mark Rogers	13 November 1975 (aged 26)	1 (0)	(England) Wycombe Wanderers
4	DF	Tony Menezes	24 November 1974 (aged 27)	21 (0)	(Brazil) Botafogo
5	DF	Jason de Vos	2 January 1974 (aged 28)	32 (3)	(England) Wigan
6	MF	Jason Bent	3 August 1977 (aged 24)	26 (0)	(England) Plymouth Argyle
7	DF	Paul Stalteri	18 October 1977 (aged 24)	32 (2)	(Germany) Werder Bremen
8	MF	Nick Dasovic	5 December 1968 (aged 33)	53 (2)	(Scotland) St Johnstone
10	FW	Davide Xausa	10 March 1976 (aged 25)	26 (2)	(Scotland) Livingston
11	MF	Jim Brennan	8 May 1977 (aged 24)	26 (2)	(England) Nottingham Forest
13	DF	Carl Fletcher	26 December 1971 (aged 30)	32 (2)	(United States) Rochester Rhinos
14	MF	Daniel Imhof	22 November 1977 (aged 24)	6 (0)	(Switzerland) St. Gallen
15	DF	Richard Hastings	18 May 1977 (aged 24)	20 (1)	(Scotland) Ross County
16	MF	Julian de Guzman	25 March 1981 (aged 20)	0 (0)	(Germany) 1. FC Saarbrücken
17	FW	Dwayne De Rosario	15 May 1978 (aged 23)	9 (0)	(United States) San Jose Earthquakes
18	MF	Tam Nsaliwa	28 January 1982 (aged 19)	3 (0)	(Germany) 1. FC Saarbrücken
19	DF	Chris Pozniak	10 January 1981 (aged 21)	0 (0)	(Sweden) Örebro
20	DF	Kevin McKenna	21 January 1980 (aged 21)	7 (1)	(Scotland) Heart of Midlothian
23	GK	Kyriakos Stamatopoulos	28 August 1979 (aged 22)	1 (0)	(Greece) Kalamata

=== Ecuador ===
Head coach: (Colombia) Hernán Darío Gómez

No.	Pos.	Player	Date of birth (age)	Caps	Club
1	GK	José Francisco Cevallos	17 April 1971 (aged 30)		(Ecuador) Barcelona
2	DF	Augusto Porozo	13 April 1974 (aged 27)		(Ecuador) Emelec
3	DF	Iván Hurtado	16 August 1974 (aged 27)		(Mexico) La Piedad
5	MF	Alfonso Obregón	12 May 1972 (aged 29)		(Ecuador) Delfín
6	DF	Raúl Guerrón	12 October 1976 (aged 25)		(Ecuador) Deportivo Quito
7	MF	Christian Lara	27 April 1980 (aged 21)		(Ecuador) El Nacional
8	MF	Luis Gómez	20 April 1972 (aged 29)		(Ecuador) Barcelona
9	FW	Carlos Tenorio	14 May 1979 (aged 22)		(Ecuador) LDU Quito
10	MF	Álex Aguinaga	9 July 1968 (aged 33)		(Mexico) Necaxa
11	MF	Nicolás Asencio	26 April 1975 (aged 26)		(Ecuador) Barcelona
12	GK	Oswaldo Ibarra	8 September 1969 (aged 32)		(Ecuador) El Nacional
13	FW	Ángel Fernández	2 August 1971 (aged 30)		(Ecuador) El Nacional
15	MF	Marlon Ayoví	27 September 1971 (aged 30)		(Ecuador) Deportivo Quito
16	MF	Cléber Chalá	29 June 1971 (aged 30)		(Ecuador) El Nacional
17	DF	Giovanny Espinoza	12 April 1977 (aged 24)		(Mexico) Monterrey
18	MF	Carlos Ramón Hidalgo	9 February 1979 (aged 22)		(Ecuador) Emelec
19	MF	Édison Méndez	16 May 1979 (aged 22)		(Ecuador) Deportivo Quito
20	MF	Edwin Tenorio	16 June 1976 (aged 25)		(Ecuador) Barcelona

=== Haiti ===
Head coach: (Argentina) Jorge Castelli

No.	Pos.	Player	Date of birth (age)	Caps	Club
1	GK	Geteau Ferdinand	19 May 1974 (aged 27)		(Haiti) Valencia
3	DF	Frantz Gilles	1 November 1975 (aged 26)		(Haiti) Zénith
4	MF	Jean Altidor	27 February 1977 (aged 24)		(Haiti) Roulado
5	DF	Jean-Jacques Pierre	23 January 1981 (aged 20)		(Haiti) Cavaly
6	DF	Gilbert Jean-Baptiste	19 February 1973 (aged 28)		(United States) Charleston Battery
8	DF	Renel Monpremier	10 January 1979 (aged 23)		(Haiti) Capoise
9	FW	Patrick Tardieu	9 June 1968 (aged 33)		(Haiti) Violette
10	FW	Johnny Descolines	8 May 1974 (aged 27)		(Haiti) Violette
12	FW	Golman Pierre	21 February 1971 (aged 30)		(Haiti) FICA
14	MF	Wilfrid Montilas	25 August 1971 (aged 30)		(Haiti) Don Bosco
15	DF	Luckenson Chery	1 January 1982 (aged 20)		(Haiti) Zénith
17	DF	David Saincius	5 June 1975 (aged 26)		(Haiti) Violette
19	FW	Charles Alerte	22 July 1982 (aged 19)		(Haiti) Aigle Noir
20	DF	Roosevelt Désir	4 April 1974 (aged 27)		(Haiti) FICA
21	FW	Pierre Roland Saint-Jean	21 June 1971 (aged 30)		(Haiti) Baltimore
22	MF	Ernst Atis-Clotaire	9 December 1977 (aged 24)		(France) Draguignan
29	GK	Dieudonné Morency	18 February 1971 (aged 30)		(Haiti) Zénith
31	DF	Pierre Richard Bruny	6 April 1972 (aged 29)		(Trinidad and Tobago) Joe Public
