= Canada men's national soccer team results (2000–2019) =

This article provides details of international soccer games played by the Canada men's national soccer team from 2000 to 2019.

== Results (2000s) ==
Key
Win
Draw
Defeat

=== 2000 ===
January 8, 2000 Friendly	Trinidad and Tobago	0–0	Canada	Port of Spain, Trinidad and Tobago
--:-- UTC+0

January 11, 2000 Friendly	Bermuda	0–2	Canada	Hamilton, Bermuda
--:-- UTC+0			Nash 25', 30'	Stadium: National Stadium

February 13, 2000 2000 CONCACAF Gold Cup	Canada	2–2	Costa Rica	San Diego, United States
--:-- UTC+0	Corazzin 19' (pen.), 57'	Report	J. Soto 11'; Wallace 54'	Stadium: Qualcomm Stadium

February 15, 2000 2000 CONCACAF Gold Cup	Canada	0–0	South Korea	Los Angeles, United States
--:-- UTC+0		Report		Stadium: Los Angeles Memorial Coliseum

February 20, 2000 2000 CONCACAF Gold Cup QF	Canada	2–1 (a.e.t.)	Mexico	San Diego, United States
--:-- UTC+0	Corazzin 83'; Hastings 92'	Report	Ramírez 35'	Stadium: Qualcomm Stadium

February 24, 2000 2000 CONCACAF Gold Cup SF	Canada	1–0	Trinidad and Tobago	Los Angeles, United States
--:-- UTC+0	Watson 68'	Report		Stadium: Los Angeles Memorial Coliseum

February 27, 2000 2000 CONCACAF Gold Cup Final	Canada	2–0	Colombia	Los Angeles, United States
--:-- UTC+0	De Vos 45'; Corazzin 68' (pen.)	Report		Stadium: Los Angeles Memorial Coliseum

May 27, 2000 Friendly	Canada	1–0	Trinidad and Tobago	Toronto, Ontario
--:-- UTC+0	Clarke 50'			Stadium: Varsity Stadium

May 30, 2000 Friendly	Canada	2–1	Honduras	Winnipeg, Manitoba
--:-- UTC+0	Peschisolido 27'; McKenna 81'		Cabrera 47'	Stadium: Winnipeg Soccer Complex

June 4, 2000 2002 World Cup qualification R1	Cuba	0–1	Canada	Havana, Cuba
--:-- UTC+0			De Vos 39'	Stadium: Estadio Pedro Marrero

June 11, 2000 2002 World Cup qualification R1	Canada	0–0 (1–0 agg.)	Cuba	Winnipeg, Manitoba
--:-- UTC+0				Stadium: Winnipeg Soccer Complex

July 16, 2000 2002 World Cup qualification R2	Canada	0–2	Trinidad and Tobago	Edmonton, Alberta
--:-- UTC+0			Eve 43'; Yorke 73'	Stadium: Commonwealth Stadium

July 23, 2000 2002 World Cup qualification R2	Panama	0–0	Canada	Panama City, Panama
--:-- UTC+0				Stadium: Estadio Rommel Fernández

August 15, 2000 2002 World Cup qualification R2	Mexico	2–0	Canada	Mexico City, Mexico
--:-- UTC+0	Abundis 48'; Fenwick 81' (o.g.)			Stadium: Estadio Azteca

September 3, 2000 2002 World Cup qualification R2	Trinidad and Tobago	4–0	Canada	Port of Spain, Trinidad and Tobago
--:-- UTC+0	Latapy 28'; Carrington 30'; Mason 54'; Eve 90'

October 9, 2000 2002 World Cup qualification R2	Canada	1–0	Panama	Winnipeg, Manitoba
--:-- UTC+0	Brennan 82'			Stadium: Winnipeg Soccer Complex

November 15, 2000 2002 World Cup qualification R2	Canada	0–0	Mexico	Toronto, Ontario
--:-- UTC+0				Stadium: Varsity Stadium

=== 2001 ===
April 24, 2001 Friendly	Egypt	3–0	Canada	Cairo, Egypt
--:-- UTC+0	Sabry 3'; Hosny 25'; Barakat 43'			Stadium: Cairo International Stadium

April 26, 2001 Friendly	Iran	0–1	Canada	Cairo, Egypt
--:-- UTC+0			Kusch 25'	Stadium: Cairo International Stadium

May 31, 2001 2001 FIFA Confederations Cup	Japan	3–0	Canada	Niigata, Japan
--:-- UTC+9	Ono 57'; Nishizawa 60'; Morishima 88'			Stadium: Niigata Stadium; Attendance: 39,006; Referee: Simon Micallef (Australia)

June 2, 2001 2001 FIFA Confederations Cup	Canada	0–0	Brazil	Kashima, Japan
--:-- UTC+9				Stadium: Kashima Soccer Stadium; Attendance: 12,095; Referee: Lu Jun (China)

June 4, 2001 2001 FIFA Confederations Cup	Cameroon	2–0	Canada	Niigata, Japan
--:-- UTC+9	Tchoutang 48'; Mboma 83' (pen.)			Stadium: Niigata Stadium; Attendance: 15,822; Referee: Byron Moreno (Ecuador)

November 14, 2001 Friendly	Malta	2–1	Canada	Paola, Malta
--:-- UTC+1	Carabott 34' (pen.); Mifsud 75'		Stalteri 43'	Stadium: Hibernians Stadium

=== 2002 ===
January 18, 2002 2002 CONCACAF Gold Cup	Canada	2–0	Haiti	Miami, United States
--:-- UTC+0	McKenna 28', 48'			Stadium: Miami Orange Bowl

January 22, 2002 2002 CONCACAF Gold Cup	Canada	0–2	Ecuador	Miami, United States
--:-- UTC+0			Aguinaga 88' (pen.), 90'	Stadium: Miami Orange Bowl

January 26, 2002 2002 CONCACAF Gold Cup QF	Canada	1–1 (6–5 p)	Martinique	Miami, United States
--:-- UTC+0	McKenna 73'		Rogers 63' (o.g.)	Stadium: Miami Orange Bowl
	Penalties
	McKenna (penalty scored); Brennan (penalty missed); De Rosario (penalty scored); Nsaliwa (penalty scored); De Vos (penalty scored); Stalteri (penalty scored); Bent (penalty scored)		(penalty scored) Lupon; (penalty scored) Clement; (penalty scored) DiCanot; (penalty scored) Mirande; (penalty missed) Reuperne; (penalty scored) Heurlie; (penalty missed) Lina

January 30, 2002 2002 CONCACAF Gold Cup SF	United States	0–0 (2–4 p)	Canada	Pasadena, United States
--:-- UTC+0				Stadium: Rose Bowl
	Penalties
	McKenna (penalty missed); Stalteri (penalty scored); De Rosario (penalty scored); Nsaliwa (penalty missed)		(penalty scored) Donovan; (penalty scored) McBride; (penalty scored) Agoos; (penalty scored) Mathis

February 2, 2002 2002 CONCACAF Gold Cup 3rd	Canada	2–1	South Korea	Pasadena, United States
--:-- UTC+0	Kim Do-hoon 34' (o.g.); De Rosario 35'		Kim Do-hoon 15'	Stadium: Rose Bowl

May 15, 2002 Friendly	Switzerland	1–3	Canada	St. Gallen, Switzerland
--:-- UTC+0	Radzinski 20', 47'; Stalteri 38'		Nkufo 80'	Stadium: Espenmoos

October 15, 2002 Friendly	Scotland	3–1	Canada	Edinburgh, Scotland
--:-- UTC+1	Crawford 11', 73'; Thompson 49'		De Rosario 9' (pen.)	Stadium: Easter Road

=== 2003 ===
January 18, 2003 Friendly	United States	4–0	Canada	Fort Lauderdale, United States
--:-- UTC+0	Bocanegra 7'; Mathis 31'; Klein 32'; Ralston 61'			Stadium: Lockhart Stadium

February 12, 2003 Friendly	Libya	2–4	Canada	Tripoli, Libya
--:-- UTC+1	Al-Taib 27' (pen.), 60'		McKenna 18'; Brenna 34'; Stalteri 47'; Cañizalez 81'	Stadium: 11 June Stadium

March 29, 2003 Friendly	Estonia	2–1	Canada	Tallinn, Estonia
--:-- UTC+3	Oper 72', 91'		Stalteri 49'	Stadium: A. Le Coq Arena

June 1, 2003 Friendly	Germany	4–1	Canada	Wolfsburg, Germany
--:-- UTC+2	Ramelow 41'; Freier 52'; Bobic 61'; Rau 90'		McKenna 20'	Stadium: Volkswagen Arena

July 12, 2003 2003 CONCACAF Gold Cup	Canada	1–0	Costa Rica	Foxborough, United States
--:-- UTC+0	Stalteri 59'			Stadium: Gillette Stadium

July 14, 2003 2003 CONCACAF Gold Cup	Canada	0–2	Cuba	Foxborough, United States
--:-- UTC+0			Moré 15', 46'	Stadium: Gillette Stadium

October 11, 2003 Friendly	Finland	3–2	Canada	Tampere, Finland
--:-- UTC+3				Stadium: Tampere Stadium

November 15, 2003 Friendly	Czech Republic	5–1	Canada	Teplice, Czech Republic
--:-- UTC+1				Stadium: Na Stínadlech

November 18, 2003 Friendly	Republic of Ireland	3–0	Canada	Dublin, Republic of Ireland
--:-- UTC+0				Stadium: Lansdowne Road

=== 2004 ===
January 18, 2004 Friendly	Barbados	0–1	Canada	Bridgetown, Barbados
--:-- UTC−4				Stadium: Barbados National Stadium

May 30, 2004 Friendly	Wales	1–0	Canada	Wrexham, Wales
--:-- UTC+1				Stadium: Racecourse Ground

June 13, 2004 2006 World Cup qualification	Canada	4–0	Belize	Kingston, Ontario
--:-- UTC−4				Stadium: Richardson Memorial Stadium

June 16, 2004 2006 World Cup qualification	Canada	4–0	Belize	Kingston, Ontario
--:-- UTC−4				Stadium: Richardson Memorial Stadium

August 18, 2004 2006 World Cup qualification	Canada	0–2	Guatemala	Burnaby, British Columbia
--:-- UTC−7			Ruiz 7', 59'	Stadium: Swangard Stadium; Attendance: 6,500; Referee: Rodolfo Sibrian (El Salvador)

September 4, 2004 2006 World Cup qualification	Canada	1–1	Honduras	Edmonton, Alberta
--:-- UTC−6	De Vos 82'		Guevara 88' (pen.)	Stadium: Commonwealth Stadium; Attendance: 8,000; Referee: Benito Archundia (Mexico)

September 8, 2004 2006 World Cup qualification	Costa Rica	1–0	Canada	San José, Costa Rica
--:-- UTC−6	Wanchope 46'			Stadium: Estadio Ricardo Saprissa Aymá; Attendance: 13,000; Referee: Ramesh Ramdhan (Trinidad and Tobago)

October 9, 2004 2006 World Cup qualification	Honduras	1–1	Canada	San Pedro Sula, Honduras
--:-- UTC−6	Turcios 90+2'		Hutchinson 73'	Stadium: Estadio Olímpico Metropolitano; Attendance: 42,000; Referee: Kevin Stott (USA)

October 13, 2004 2006 World Cup qualification	Canada	1–3	Costa Rica	Burnaby, British Columbia
--:-- UTC−7	De Rosario 12'		Wanchope 49'; Sunsing 81'; Hernández 87'	Stadium: Swangard Stadium; Attendance: 4,000; Referee: Peter Prendergast (Jamaica)

November 17, 2004 2006 World Cup qualification	Guatemala	0–1	Canada	Guatemala City, Guatemala
--:-- UTC−6			De Rosario 57'	Stadium: Estadio Doroteo Guamuch Flores; Attendance: 18,000; Referee: Marco Rodríguez (Mexico)

=== 2005 ===
February 9, 2005 Friendly	Northern Ireland	0–1	Canada	Belfast, Northern Ireland
--:-- UTC+0				Stadium: Windsor Park

March 26, 2005 Friendly	Portugal	4–1	Canada	Barcelos, Portugal
--:-- UTC+0				Stadium: Estádio Cidade de Barcelos

July 2, 2005 Friendly	Canada	1–2	Honduras	Burnaby, British Columbia
--:-- UTC+0				Stadium: Swangard Stadium

July 7, 2005 2005 CONCACAF Gold Cup	Canada	0–1	Costa Rica	Seattle, United States
--:-- UTC+0				Stadium: Qwest Field

July 9, 2005 2005 CONCACAF Gold Cup	United States	2–0	Canada	Seattle, United States
--:-- UTC+0				Stadium: Qwest Field

July 12, 2005 2005 CONCACAF Gold Cup	Canada	2–1	Cuba	Foxborough, United States
--:-- UTC+0				Stadium: Gillette Stadium

September 3, 2005 Friendly	Spain	2–1	Canada	Santander, Spain
--:-- UTC+2

November 16, 2005 Friendly	Luxembourg	0–1	Canada	Hesperange, Luxembourg
--:-- UTC+1				Stadium: Stade Alphonse Theis

=== 2006 ===
January 22, 2006 Friendly	United States	0–0	Canada	San Diego, United States
--:-- UTC+0				Stadium: Torero Stadium

March 1, 2006 Friendly	Austria	0–2	Canada	Vienna, Austria
--:-- UTC+1				Stadium: Ernst-Happel-Stadion

September 4, 2006 Friendly	Canada	1–0	Jamaica	Montreal, Quebec
--:-- UTC+0				Stadium: Complexe sportif Claude-Robillard

October 8, 2006 Friendly	Jamaica	2–1	Canada	Kingston, Jamaica
--:-- UTC+0				Stadium: Independence Park

November 15, 2006 Friendly	Hungary	1–0	Canada	Székesfehérvár, Hungary
--:-- UTC+1

=== 2007 ===
March 24, 2007 Friendly	Bermuda	0–3	Canada	Devonshire Parish, Bermuda
--:-- UTC+1				Stadium: Bermuda National Stadium

June 1, 2007 Friendly	Venezuela	2–2	Canada	Maracaibo, Venezuela
--:-- UTC+1				Stadium: Estadio José Pachencho Romero

June 6, 2007 2007 CONCACAF Gold Cup	Canada	2–1	Costa Rica	Miami, United States
--:-- UTC+1				Stadium: Orange Bowl

June 9, 2007 2007 CONCACAF Gold Cup	Canada	1–2	Guadeloupe	Miami, United States
--:-- UTC+1				Stadium: Orange Bowl

June 11, 2007 2007 CONCACAF Gold Cup	Canada	2–0	Haiti	Miami, United States
--:-- UTC+1				Stadium: Orange Bowl

June 16, 2007 2007 CONCACAF Gold Cup	Canada	3–0	Guatemala	Foxborough, United States
--:-- UTC+0				Stadium: Gillette Stadium

June 21, 2007 2007 CONCACAF Gold Cup	United States	2–1	Canada	Chicago, United States
--:-- UTC+0				Stadium: Soldier Field

August 22, 2007 Friendly	Iceland	1–1	Canada	Reykjavík, Iceland
--:-- UTC+0				Stadium: Laugardalsvöllur

September 12, 2007 Friendly	Canada	1–1	Costa Rica	Toronto, Ontario
--:-- UTC+0				Stadium: BMO Field

November 20, 2007 Friendly	South Africa	2–0	Canada	Durban, South Africa
--:-- UTC+0				Stadium: ABSA Stadium

=== 2008 ===
January 30, 2008 Friendly	Martinique	0–1	Canada	Fort-de-France, Martinique
--:-- UTC+1				Stadium: Stade Louis Achille

March 26, 2008 Friendly	Estonia	2–0	Canada	Tallinn, Estonia
--:-- UTC+2				Stadium: A. Le Coq Arena

May 31, 2008 Friendly	Canada	2–3	Brazil	Seattle, United States
--:-- UTC+1				Stadium: QWest Field

June 4, 2008 Friendly	Canada	2–2	Panama	Fort Lauderdale, United States
--:-- UTC+1				Stadium: Holiday Inn Sunrise

June 15, 2008 2010 World Cup qualification	Saint Vincent and the Grenadines	0–3	Canada	Kingstown, Saint Vincent and the Grenadines
--:-- UTC+1			Nakajima-Farran 32'; Gerba 43', 88'	Stadium: Arnos Vale Playing Ground; Attendance: 5,000

June 20, 2008 2010 World Cup qualification	Canada	4–1	Saint Vincent and the Grenadines	Montreal, Quebec
--:-- UTC+1	De Rosario 29', 50'; Gerba 38', 63'		James 76'	Stadium: Stade Saputo; Attendance: 11,502

August 20, 2008 2010 World Cup qualification	Canada	1–1	Jamaica	Toronto, Ontario
--:-- UTC+1	De Guzman 47'		Williams 52'	Stadium: BMO Field; Attendance: 22,000

September 6, 2008 2010 World Cup qualification	Canada	1–2	Honduras	Montreal, Quebec
--:-- UTC+1	Serioux 4'		R. Núñez 47', 56'	Stadium: Stade Saputo; Attendance: 13,032

September 10, 2008 2010 World Cup qualification	Mexico	2–1	Canada	Tuxtla Gutierrez, Mexico
--:-- UTC+1	Bravo 59'; Márquez 73'		Gerba 78'	Stadium: Estadio Víctor Manuel Reyna; Attendance: 26,900

October 11, 2008 2010 World Cup qualification	Honduras	3–1	Canada	San Pedro Sula, Honduras
--:-- UTC+1	W. Martínez 9'; Costly 65'; Thomas 90'		Hainault 54'	Stadium: Estadio Olímpico Metropolitano; Attendance: 36,000

October 15, 2008 2010 World Cup qualification	Canada	2–2	Mexico	Edmonton, Alberta
--:-- UTC+1	Gerba 13'; Radzinski 50'		Salcido 35'; Vuoso 64'	Stadium: Commonwealth Stadium; Attendance: 14,145

November 19, 2008 2010 World Cup qualification	Jamaica	3–0	Canada	Kingston, Jamaica
--:-- UTC+1	Shelton 28'; King 58' (pen.); Cummings 85'			Stadium: Independence Park; Attendance: 28,000

=== 2009 ===
May 30, 2009 Friendly	Cyprus	0–1	Canada	Larnaca, Cyprus
--:-- UTC+3				Stadium: Antonis Papadopoulos Stadium

June 30, 2009 Friendly	Canada	3–0	Guatemala	Oxnard, United States
--:-- UTC+3				Stadium: Oxnard College

July 3, 2009 2009 CONCACAF Gold Cup	Canada	1–0	Jamaica	Los Angeles, United States
--:-- UTC+3				Stadium: Home Depot Center

July 7, 2009 2009 CONCACAF Gold Cup	Canada	1–0	El Salvador	Columbus, United States
--:-- UTC+3				Stadium: Columbus Crew Stadium

July 10, 2009 2009 CONCACAF Gold Cup	Canada	2–2	Costa Rica	Miami, United States
--:-- UTC+3				Stadium: FIU Stadium

July 18, 2009 2009 CONCACAF Gold Cup	Canada	0–1	Honduras	Philadelphia, United States
--:-- UTC+3				Stadium: Lincoln Financial Field

November 14, 2009 Friendly	Macedonia	3–0	Canada	Strumica, Macedonia
--:-- UTC+1				Stadium: Stadion Mladost

November 18, 2009 Friendly	Poland	1–0	Canada	Bydgoszcz, Poland
--:-- UTC+1				Stadium: Stadion Miejski Zawiszy

== Results (2010s) ==
=== 2010 ===
January 31, 2010 Friendly	Jamaica	1–0	Canada	Kingston, Jamaica
--:-- UTC+1				Stadium: Independence Park

May 24, 2010 Friendly	Argentina	5–0	Canada	Buenos Aires, Argentina
--:-- UTC+1	M. Rodríguez 15', 31'; Di María 36'; Tevez 62'; Agüero 74'			Stadium: Estadio River Plate

May 29, 2010 Friendly	Venezuela	1–1	Canada	Mérida, Venezuela
--:-- UTC+1				Stadium: Estadio Metropolitano de Mérida

September 4, 2010 Friendly	Canada	0–2	Peru	Toronto, Ontario
--:-- UTC+1				Stadium: BMO Field

September 7, 2010 Friendly	Canada	2–1	Honduras	Montreal, Quebec
--:-- UTC+1				Stadium: Stade Saputo

October 8, 2010 Friendly	Ukraine	2–2	Canada	Kyiv, Ukraine
--:-- UTC+3				Stadium: Valeriy Lobanovskyi Dynamo Stadium

=== 2011 ===
February 9, 2011 Friendly	Greece	1–0	Canada	Larissa, Greece
--:-- UTC+2				Stadium: AEL FC Arena

March 29, 2011 Friendly	Belarus	0–1	Canada	Antalya, Turkey
--:-- UTC+2				Stadium: Antalya Atatürk Stadium

June 1, 2011 Friendly	Canada	2–2	Ecuador	Toronto, Ontario
--:-- UTC+1				Stadium: BMO Field

June 7, 2011 2011 CONCACAF Gold Cup	United States	2–0	Canada	Detroit, United States
--:-- UTC+1				Stadium: Ford Field

June 11, 2011 2011 CONCACAF Gold Cup	Canada	1–0	Guadeloupe	Tampa, United States
--:-- UTC+1				Stadium: Raymond James Stadium

June 14, 2011 2011 CONCACAF Gold Cup	Panama	1–1	Canada	Kansas City, United States
--:-- UTC+1				Stadium: Livestrong Sporting Park

September 2, 2011 2014 World Cup qualification	Canada	4–1	Saint Lucia	Toronto, Ontario
--:-- UTC+1				Stadium: BMO Field

September 6, 2011 2014 World Cup qualification	Puerto Rico	0–3	Canada	Bayamón, Puerto Rico
--:-- UTC+1				Stadium: Juan Ramón Loubriel Stadium

October 7, 2011 2014 World Cup qualification	Saint Lucia	0–7	Canada	Gros Islet, Saint Lucia
--:-- UTC+1				Stadium: Beausejour Stadium

October 11, 2011 2014 World Cup qualification	Canada	0–0	Puerto Rico	Toronto, Ontario
--:-- UTC+1				Stadium: BMO Field

November 11, 2011 2014 World Cup qualification	Saint Kitts and Nevis	0–0	Canada	Basseterre, Saint Kitts and Nevis
--:-- UTC+1				Stadium: Warner Park Football Stadium

November 15, 2011 2014 World Cup qualification	Canada	4–0	Saint Kitts and Nevis	Toronto, Ontario
--:-- UTC+1				Stadium: BMO Field

=== 2012 ===
February 29, 2012 Friendly	Armenia	3–1	Canada	Limassol, Cyprus
--:-- UTC+2				Stadium: Tsirio Stadium

June 3, 2012 Friendly	Canada	0–0	United States	Toronto, Ontario
--:-- UTC+1				Stadium: BMO Field

June 8, 2012 2014 World Cup qualification	Cuba	0–1	Canada	Havana, Cuba
14:00 UTC−4			Occean 54'	Stadium: Estadio Pedro Marrero; Attendance: 7,000; Referee: Courtney Campbell (Jamaica)

June 12, 2012 2014 World Cup qualification	Canada	0–0	Honduras	Toronto, Ontario
19:45 UTC−4				Stadium: BMO Field; Attendance: 16,132; Referee: Enrico Wijngaarde (Suriname)

August 15, 2012 Friendly	Canada	2–0	Trinidad and Tobago	Lauderhill, United States
--:-- UTC+1				Stadium: Central Broward Park

September 7, 2012 2014 World Cup qualification	Canada	1–0	Panama	Toronto, Ontario
19:45 UTC−4	De Rosario 77'			Stadium: BMO Field; Attendance: 17,586; Referee: Jeffrey Solís (Costa Rica)

September 11, 2012 2014 World Cup qualification	Panama	2–0	Canada	Panama City, Panama
20:05 UTC−5	Blackburn 22'; Pérez 57'			Stadium: Estadio Rommel Fernández; Attendance: 20,000; Referee: Elmer Bonilla (El Salvador)

October 12, 2012 2014 World Cup qualification	Canada	3–0	Cuba	Toronto, Ontario
19:45 UTC−4	Ricketts 14'; Johnson 73'; Edgar 78'			Stadium: BMO Field; Attendance: 17,712; Referee: Javier Santos (Puerto Rico)

October 16, 2012 2014 World Cup qualification	Honduras	8–1	Canada	San Pedro Sula, Honduras
14:00 UTC−6	Bengtson 7', 17', 83'; Costly 29', 49', 88'; Martínez 33', 61'		Hume 77'	Stadium: Estadio Olímpico Metropolitano; Attendance: 38,000; Referee: Mauricio Morales (Mexico)

=== 2013 ===
January 26, 2013 Friendly	Canada	0–4	Denmark	Tucson, United States
--:-- UTC+2		Report		Stadium: Kino Veterans Memorial Stadium

January 29, 2013 Friendly	United States	0–0	Canada	Houston, United States
--:-- UTC+2		Report		Stadium: BBVA Compass Stadium

March 22, 2013 Friendly	Japan	2–1	Canada	Doha, Qatar
--:-- UTC+2		Report		Stadium: Khalifa International Stadium

March 25, 2013 Friendly	Belarus	2–0	Canada	Doha, Qatar
--:-- UTC+2		Report		Stadium: Aspire Dome

May 28, 2013 Friendly	Canada	0–1	Costa Rica	Edmonton, Alberta
--:-- UTC+2		Report		Stadium: Commonwealth Stadium

July 7, 2013 2013 CONCACAF Gold Cup	Canada	0–1	Martinique	Pasadena, United States
17:30 UTC+2		Report	Reuperné 90+3'	Stadium: Rose Bowl; Attendance: 56,82; Referee: Marcos Brea (Cuba)

July 11, 2013 2013 CONCACAF Gold Cup	Mexico	2–0	Canada	Seattle, United States
23:00 UTC+2	R. Jiménez 42'; Fabián 57' (pen.)	Report		Stadium: CenturyLink Field; Attendance: 28,354; Referee: Joel Aguilar (El Salvador)

July 14, 2013 2013 CONCACAF Gold Cup	Panama	0–0	Canada	Denver, United States
15:30 UTC+2		Report		Stadium: Sports Authority Field; Attendance: 30,000; Referee: Wálter Quesada (Costa Rica)

September 8, 2013 Friendly	Canada	0–0	Mauritania	Oliva, Spain
--:-- UTC+2		Report		Stadium: Estadio Oliva Nova

September 10, 2013 Friendly	Canada	0–1	Mauritania	Oliva, Spain
--:-- UTC+2		Report		Stadium: Estadio Oliva Nova

October 15, 2013 Friendly	Canada	0–3	Australia	London, England
--:-- UTC+2		Report		Stadium: Craven Cottage

November 15, 2013 Friendly	Czech Republic	2–0	Canada	Olomouc, Czech Republic
--:-- UTC+1		Report		Stadium: Andrův stadion

November 19, 2013 Friendly	Slovenia	1–0	Canada	Celje, Slovenia
--:-- UTC+1	Birsa 52'	Report		Stadium: Stadion Z'dežele

=== 2014 ===
May 23, 2014 Friendly	Bulgaria	1–1	Canada	Ritzing, Austria
--:-- UTC+2	19'	Report	Hutchinson 27' (pen.)	Stadium: Sonnenseestadion; Attendance: 50

May 27, 2014 Friendly	Moldova	1–1	Canada	Mauer, Austria
--:-- UTC+2	7'	Report	Ricketts 10'	Stadium: Sportplatz SVU Mauer; Attendance: 200

September 9, 2014 Friendly	Canada	3–1	Jamaica	Toronto, Ontario
--:-- UTC+2				Stadium: BMO Field

October 14, 2014 Friendly	Canada	0–1	Colombia	Harrison, United States
--:-- UTC+2				Stadium: Red Bull Arena

November 18, 2014 Friendly	Panama	0–0	Canada	Panama City, Panama
--:-- UTC+2				Stadium: Estadio Rommel Fernández

=== 2015 ===
January 16, 2015 Friendly	Canada	1–2	Iceland	Orlando, United States
--:-- UTC+2				Stadium: UCF Soccer and Track Stadium

January 19, 2015 Friendly	Canada	1–1	Iceland	Orlando, United States
--:-- UTC+2				Stadium: UCF Soccer and Track Stadium

March 27, 2015 Friendly	Canada	1–0	Guatemala	Fort Lauderdale, United States
--:-- UTC+2				Stadium: Lockhart Stadium

March 30, 2015 Friendly	Puerto Rico	0–3	Canada	Bayamón, Puerto Rico
--:-- UTC+2				Stadium: Juan Ramón Loubriel Stadium

June 11, 2015 2018 World Cup qualification	Dominica	0–2	Canada	Roseau, Dominica
--:-- UTC+2				Stadium: Windsor Park

June 16, 2015 2018 World Cup qualification	Canada	4–0	Dominica	Toronto, Ontario
--:-- UTC+2				Stadium: BMO Field

July 8, 2015 2015 CONCACAF Gold Cup	El Salvador	0–0	Canada	Carson, United States
19:30 UTC+2				Stadium: StubHub Center

July 11, 2015 2015 CONCACAF Gold Cup	Jamaica	1–0	Canada	Houston, United States
17:30 UTC+2				Stadium: BBVA Compass Stadium

July 14, 2015 2015 CONCACAF Gold Cup	Canada	0–0	Costa Rica	Toronto, Ontario
20:30 UTC+2				Stadium: BMO Field

September 4, 2015 2018 World Cup qualification	Canada	3–0	Belize	Toronto, Ontario
19:37 –4				Stadium: BMO Field

September 8, 2015 2018 World Cup qualification	Belize	1–1	Canada	Belmopan, Belize
19:00 –6				Stadium: FFB Stadium

October 13, 2015 Friendly	Canada	1–1	Ghana	Washington DC, U.S.
19:30 UTC−4	de Jong 28'	Report	Adomah 45'	Stadium: RFK Stadium; Attendance: 2,300

November 13, 2015 2018 World Cup qualification	Canada	1–0	Honduras	Vancouver, British Columbia
19:00 UTC−4	Larin 38'	Report		Stadium: BC Place Stadium; Attendance: 20,108

November 17, 2015 2018 World Cup qualification	El Salvador	0–0	Canada	San Salvador, El Salvador
19:30 UTC−4		Report		Stadium: Estadio Cuscatlán; Attendance: 7,416

=== 2016 ===
February 5, 2016 Friendly	United States	1–0	Canada	Carson, United States
--:-- UTC+2	Altidore 90'

March 25, 2016 2018 World Cup qualification	Canada	0–3	Mexico	Vancouver, British Columbia
--:-- UTC+2			Hernández 32'; Lozano 40'; Corona 72'

March 29, 2016 2018 World Cup qualification	Mexico	2–0	Canada	Mexico City, Mexico
--:-- UTC+2	Guardado 17' (pen.); Corona 45+3'

June 3, 2016 Friendly	Canada	1–1	Azerbaijan	Rohrbach an der Lafnitz, Austria
--:-- UTC+2	Akindele 43'		Nazarov 58' (pen.)

June 7, 2016 Friendly	Canada	2–1	Uzbekistan	Bad Waltersdorf, Austria
--:-- UTC+2	Edgar 20'; Komilov 81' (o.g.)		Shomurodov 62'

September 2, 2016 2018 World Cup qualification	Honduras	2–1	Canada	San Pedro Sula, Honduras
--:-- UTC+2	Martínez 45+2'; Quioto 50'		James 35'

September 6, 2016 2018 World Cup qualification	Canada	3–1	El Salvador	Vancouver, British Columbia
--:-- UTC+2	Larin 11'; Ledgerwood 53'; Edgar 90+2'		Bonilla 78'

October 6, 2016 Friendly	Mauritania	0–4	Canada	Marrakesh, Morocco
--:-- UTC+2			Ricketts 52', 80'; Vitoria 55'; Haber 58'

October 11, 2016 Friendly	Morocco	4–0	Canada	Marrakesh, Morocco
--:-- UTC+2	Carcela-Gonzalez 12'; Ziyech 65' (pen.), 81' (pen.); Alioui 86'

November 16, 2016 Friendly	South Korea	2–0	Canada	Cheonan, South Korea
--:-- UTC+2	Bo-kyung 10'; Jeong-hyeop 25'

=== 2017 ===
January 22, 2017 Friendly	Bermuda	2–4	Canada	Hamilton, Bermuda
15:00 ADT (UTC−03:00)	Harvey 12'; Straith 55' (o.g.)	Report	Osorio 21'; Ricketts 23'; Chapman 75'; Jackson-Hamel 88'	Stadium: Bermuda National Stadium; Attendance: 1,814; Referee: Ismail Elfath (United States)

March 22, 2017 Friendly	Scotland	1–1	Canada	Edinburgh, Scotland
19:45 WET (UTC+00:00)	Naismith 34'	Report	Aird 10'	Stadium: Easter Road; Attendance: 9,158; Referee: Jakob Kehlet (Denmark)

June 13, 2017 Friendly	Canada	2–1	Curaçao	Montreal, Quebec
19:30 EDT (UTC−04:00)	James 45'; Jackson-Hamel 87'	Report	Janga 43'	Stadium: Saputo Stadium; Attendance: 6,026; Referee: Ted Unkel (United States)

July 7, 2017 2017 CONCACAF Gold Cup	French Guiana	2–4	Canada	Harrison, United States
19:00 EDT (UTC−04:00)	Contout 69'; Privat 70'	Report	Jaković 28'; Arfield 45'; Davies 60', 86'	Stadium: Red Bull Arena; Attendance: 25,817; Referee: John Pitti (Panama)

July 11, 2017 2017 CONCACAF Gold Cup	Costa Rica	1–1	Canada	Houston, United States
19:00 CDT (UTC−05:00)	Calvo 42'	Report	Davies 26'	Stadium: BBVA Compass Stadium; Attendance: 12,019; Referee: Mark Geiger (United States)

July 14, 2017 2017 CONCACAF Gold Cup	Canada	0–0	Honduras	Frisco, United States
21:00 CDT (UTC−05:00)		Report		Stadium: Toyota Stadium; Attendance: 10,048; Referee: Joel Aguilar (El Salvador)

July 20, 2017 2017 CONCACAF Gold Cup	Jamaica	2–1	Canada	Glendale, United States
19:00 MST (UTC−07:00)	Francis 6'; Williams 50'	Report	Hoilett 61'	Stadium: University of Phoenix Stadium; Attendance: 37,404; Referee: Ricardo Montero (Costa Rica)

September 2, 2017 Friendly	Canada	2–0	Jamaica	Toronto, Ontario
19:00 EST (UTC−04:00)	Jackson-Hamel 16'; Osorio 30'	Report		Stadium: BMO Field; Attendance: 21,724; Referee: Ricardo Montero (Costa Rica)

October 8, 2017 Friendly	Canada	0–1	El Salvador	Houston, United States
16:00 CDT		Report	Pineda 75'	Stadium: BBVA Compass Stadium

=== 2018 ===
March 24, 2018 Friendly	Canada	1–0	New Zealand	San Pedro del Pinatar, Spain
16:00 CEST (UTC+02:00)	Ricketts 54'	Report		Stadium: Pinatar Arena; Attendance: 75; Referee: David Fernández Borbalán (Spain)

September 9, 2018 2019–20 Nations League qualifying	U.S. Virgin Islands	0–8	Canada	Bradenton, United States
16:00 EDT (UTC-04:00)		Report	Osorio 6'; Cavallini 8', 45'; David 32', 37'; Hoilett 50'; Larin 60', 80'	Stadium: IMG Academy; Attendance: 150; Referee: Moeth Gaymes (Saint Vincent and the Grenadines)

October 16, 2018 2019–20 Nations League qualifying	Canada	5–0	Dominica	Toronto, Ontario
19:00 EDT (UTC-04:00)	David 3'; Hoilett 14'; Cavallini 18' (pen.); Joseph 47' (o.g.); Larin 82'	Report		Stadium: BMO Field; Attendance: 10,523; Referee: Oscar Macías Romo (Mexico)

November 18, 2018 2019–20 Nations League qualifying	Saint Kitts and Nevis	0–1	Canada	Basseterre, St. Kitts and Nevis
21:00 AST (UTC-04:00)		Report	Hutchinson 44'	Stadium: Warner Park; Referee: Kevin Morrison (Jamaica)

=== 2019 ===
March 24, 2019 2019–20 Nations League qualifying	Canada	4–1	French Guiana	Vancouver, British Columbia
15:00 PDT (UTC-07:00)	Hoilett 11'; Cavallini 39', 50'; David 41'	Report	Rimane 26'	Stadium: BC Place; Attendance: 17,124; Referee: Diego Montaño (Mexico)

June 10, 2019 Training match	Trinidad and Tobago	0–2	Canada	Fullerton, United States
15:00 PDT (UTC-07:00)		Report	Arfield 5', 90'	Stadium: Titan Stadium; Attendance: Closed-door
Note: Unofficial friendly. Caps and goals not awarded. Elo rating affected.

June 15, 2019 2019 Gold Cup Group A	Canada	4–0	Martinique	Pasadena, United States
16:30 PDT (UTC-07:00)	David 33', 53'; Hoilett 63'; Arfield 67'	Report		Stadium: Rose Bowl; Referee: Said Martínez (Honduras)

June 19, 2019 2019 Gold Cup Group A	Mexico	3–1	Canada	Denver, United States
20:00 MDT (UTC-06:00)	Alvarado 40'; Guardado 54', 77'	Report	Cavallini 75'	Stadium: Broncos Stadium at Mile High; Attendance: 52,874; Referee: Henry Bejarano (Costa Rica)

June 23, 2019 2019 Gold Cup Group A	Canada	7–0	Cuba	Charlotte, United States
18:00 EDT (UTC-04:00)	David 3', 71', 77'; Cavallini 21', 43', 45+1'; Hoilett 50'	Report		Stadium: Bank of America Stadium; Referee: Armando Villarreal (United States)

June 29, 2019 2019 Gold Cup quarter-finals	Haiti	3–2	Canada	Houston, United States
19:00 CDT (UTC−05:00)	Nazon 50'; Bazile 70' (pen.); Guerrier 76'	Report	David 18'; Cavallini 28'	Stadium: NRG Stadium; Referee: Jair Marrufo (United States)

September 7, 2019 2019–20 Nations League A	Canada	6–0	Cuba	Toronto, Ontario
20:00 EDT (UTC-04:00)	Hoilett 13', 50', 82' (pen.); David 21'; Osorio 52'; Henry 65'	Report		Stadium: BMO Field; Attendance: 10,224; Referee: Fernando Hernández (Mexico)

September 10, 2019 2019–20 Nations League A	Cuba	0–1	Canada	George Town, Cayman Islands
19:15 EDT (UTC-04:00)		Report	Davies 9'	Stadium: Truman Bodden Sports Complex; Referee: Mario Escobar (Guatemala)

October 15, 2019 2019–20 Nations League A	Canada	2–0	United States	Toronto, Ontario
19:30 EDT (UTC-04:00)	Davies 63'; Cavallini 90+1'	Report		Stadium: BMO Field; Attendance: 17,126; Referee: Daneon Parchment (Jamaica)

November 15, 2019 2019–20 Nations League A	United States	4–1	Canada	Orlando, United States
19:00	Morris 2'; Zardes 23', 89'; Long 34'	Report	Vitória 72'	Stadium: Exploria Stadium; Attendance: 13,103; Referee: César Ramos (Mexico)
