= Miñoso =

Miñoso is a surname. Notable people with the surname include:

- Minnie Miñoso (1925–2015), Cuban baseball player
- Silvio Pedro Miñoso (born 1976), Cuban footballer
