= Max Sánchez =

Costa Rican footballer (born 1973)

Personal information
- Full name: Max Sánchez Barrantes
- Date of birth: 2 January 1973 (age 53)
- Place of birth: Costa Rica
- Height: 1.85 m (6 ft 1 in)
- Position: Defensive midfielder

Senior career*
Years	Team	Apps	(Gls)
1990–1991	Saprissa		
1991–1992	Pérez Zeledón		
1993–1994	San Carlos		
1994–1995	Ramonense		
1995–1996	Santos de Guápiles		
1996–1997	Turrialba		
1997–1999	Ramonense		
1999–2002	Santos de Guápiles	70	(8)
2002	Saprissa	14	(1)
2003	Cartaginés		
2003–2004	→ Santa Bárbara (loan)		
2004	Santos de Guápiles	9	(1)
2005–2007	Puntarenas	77	(13)
2007	Cartaginés	4	(0)
2008	Liberia Mía	28	(1)
2009	Puntarenas	5	(0)
2010	Municipal Grecia		
2010	Limón	9	(0)
2011	Barrio Mexico		
2012	Escazuceña		

International career
2002	Costa Rica	4	(0)
- * Club domestic league appearances and goals

Max Sánchez Barrantes (born 2 January 1973) is a retired Costa Rican professional footballer.

== Club career ==
Sánchez once boasted the record of having played for the most clubs in Costa Rica's Primera Division de Costa Rica, alongside former teammate Evance Benwell, but was finally surpassed by Benwell who notched up 12 different teams.

He among others played for Santos de Guápiles, Cartaginés, Santa Bárbara, Saprissa, Puntarenas and Liberia Mía in the Primera Division de Costa Rica. In summer 2002 he was on the verge of signing for Greek side OFI.

In summer 2010 he returned to the Premier Division when he joined Limón from second division Municipal Grecia.

== International career ==
A tall holding midfielder, Sánchez made four appearances for the Costa Rica national football team, his debut coming in the 2002 CONCACAF Gold Cup semi-final against South Korea.
