= Uwaldo Pérez =

Guatemalan footballer

Personal information
- Full name: Uwaldo Mohamed Pérez Morrison
- Date of birth: October 25, 1979 (age 46)
- Place of birth: Guatemala City, Guatemala
- Height: 1.70 m (5 ft 7 in)
- Position: Midfielder

Senior career*
Years	Team	Apps	(Gls)
2000–2003	Municipal		
2003–2004	CSD Comunicaciones		
2004	Deportivo Marquense	13	(0)
2005–2006	Antigua GFC	50	(0)
2006–2007	CD Suchitepéquez		
2007–2010	Heredia Jaguares		
2010	Sacachispas		
2010–present	USAC		

International career^{‡}
2000–2003	Guatemala	19	(1)
- * Club domestic league appearances and goals as of 21 July 2010 ‡ National team caps and goals as of 21 July 2010

Uwaldo Mohamed Pérez Morrison (born 25 October 1979) is a Guatemalan former professional footballer who played as a defender.

== Club career ==
Born in the capital city Guatemala City, Pérez started his professional career at local Guatemalan giants Municipal and then had a spell at their eternal rivals CSD Comunicaciones. He then played for Marquense, Antigua and Suchitepéquez before joining Heredia in summer 2007. He moved to Sacachispas in April 2010.

In June 2010 he was revealed as one of several reinforcements of USAC.

== International career ==
He made his debut for Guatemala in a January 2000 friendly match against Panama and has earned a total of 19 caps, scoring 1 goal. He has represented his country in 6 FIFA World Cup qualification matches and played at the 2001 UNCAF Nations Cup and the 2002 CONCACAF Gold Cup.

His most recent international was a January 2003 friendly match against El Salvador.
