= Alberto Delgado (Cuban footballer) =

Cuban footballer (born 1978)

Personal information
- Full name: Alberto Delgado y Pérez
- Date of birth: March 11, 1978 (age 48)
- Place of birth: Havana, Cuba
- Height: 1.75 m (5 ft 9 in)
- Position: Striker

Senior career*
Years	Team	Apps	(Gls)
1998–2004	Ciudad de la Habana		
2004	Colorado Rapids	13	(1)
2005–2008	Puerto Rico Islanders	38	(0)
2008–2009	→ Sevilla Bayamon (loan)		(14)

International career^{‡}
1998–2002	Cuba	22	(4)
- * Club domestic league appearances and goals as of 22 February 2008 ‡ National team caps and goals as of 22 February 2008

Alberto Delgado y Pérez (born March 11, 1978) is a Cuban retired footballer.

== Club career ==
Before joining the Rapids in 2005, he played for Ciudad de la Habana of Cuba and was one of the most dangerous players on the Cuba national team.

Delgado scored a goal and added three assists in his year with Colorado. He wears Pérez on the back of his jersey to honor his mother. He was released by the Rapids before the 2005 season, signing with Puerto Rico.

In 2008, he was loaned to Sevilla Bayamon in the Puerto Rico Soccer League and decided to stay with them instead of the Puerto Rico Islanders.

== International career ==
He made his international debut for Cuba in 1998 and has earned a total of 22 caps, scoring 4 goals. He scored all of his goals in one game against Surinam, making him the only Cuban to score 4 in an official international match. His final international was a January 2002 CONCACAF Gold Cup match against South Korea.

=== Defection to the United States ===
Delgado defected from Cuba during that 2002 Gold Cup, together with cousin and future Colorado Rapids teammate Rey Ángel Martínez. He and Martínez ran away from their teammates halfway through breakfast, literally running for more than thirty minutes before finding a Spanish-speaking gas station attendant who then called a cab for them. Martínez made his way there shortly after that.

=== International goals ===
Scores and results list Cuba's goal tally first.

No	Date	Venue	Opponent	Score	Result	Competition
1.	16 May 2001	Centre of Excellence Stadium, Tunapuna, Trinidad and Tobago	Suriname	1–2	4–3	2001 Caribbean Cup
2.	16 May 2001	Centre of Excellence Stadium, Tunapuna, Trinidad and Tobago	Suriname	2–2	4–3	2001 Caribbean Cup
3.	16 May 2001	Centre of Excellence Stadium, Tunapuna, Trinidad and Tobago	Suriname	3–2	4–3	2001 Caribbean Cup
4.	16 May 2001	Centre of Excellence Stadium, Tunapuna, Trinidad and Tobago	Suriname	4–2	4–3	2001 Caribbean Cup
