= Ignacio Hierro =

Mexican footballer (born 1978)

Personal information
- Full name: Ignacio Hierro González
- Date of birth: 22 June 1978 (age 48)
- Place of birth: Mexico City, Mexico
- Height: 1.80 m (5 ft 11 in)
- Position: Defender

Senior career*
Years	Team	Apps	(Gls)
1997–1999	América	30	(1)
1999–2000	Guadalajara	13	(0)
2000–2002	Atlante	59	(0)
2002	Pachuca	10	(0)
2003	Monterrey	4	(0)
2003–2004	Atlante	18	(0)
2004	Acapulco	1	(0)
2004–2005	Puebla	17	(0)
2005–2006	León	15	(0)
2007–2008	Atlante	14	(0)
2009	Potros Chetumal	17	(0)

International career
1997	Mexico U-20	4	(0)
1999–2003	Mexico	12	(0)

Managerial career
- 2013–2016: Pachuca (chief analyst)
- 2016–2018: Everton (sporting director)
- 2018–2019: Atlas (sporting director)
- 2019–2022: Mexico (sporting director)
- 2023–2024: Sporting (sporting director)
- 2025–2025: Costa Rica (sporting director)
Medal record
Representing Mexico
Runner-up	Copa America	2001
- * Club domestic league appearances and goals

Ignacio Hierro González (born 22 June 1978) is a Mexican former football defender and former sporting director of the Costa Rica national team. He is also a co-founder of the magazine 'Yo Soy Futbol', which focuses on Mexican professional football.

== Career ==
Hierro debuted for América on February 8, 1997, as the Aguilas defeated Puebla F.C., 2–0. He was involved in a controversial transfer in 1999, when he was traded to arch-rival club Chivas de Guadalajara, becoming another player to dispute the Mexican SuperClasico for both sides. After Chivas, he joined Atlante in 2000. He bounced around many teams in the Mexican League, most notably CF Monterrey, where he was champion in 2003.

Ignacio had become a fixture in Atlante, where he won in Apertura 2007 the Mexican Liguilla. Most recently, he played in 11 games for Atlante's filial team Potros Chetumal during the Apertura 2008, as their vice-captain.

He retired early in his career, due to frequent injuries and five surgeries in five years.

== International career ==
Ignacio Hierro was on the Mexican U-20 team for the 1997 FIFA World Youth Championship held in Malaysia. He was capped 12 times for the senior team, disputing the 2000 CONCACAF Gold Cup and 2002 CONCACAF Gold Cup, and the Copa América 2001.

== Honours ==
Monterrey

- Mexican Championship: Clausura 2003

Atlante

- Mexican Championship: Apertura 2007

Mexico U23

- Pan American Games Gold Medal: 1999

Mexico

- Copa América runner-up: 2001
