= Marco Garcés =

Mexican footballer (born 1972)

Personal information
- Full name: Marco Antonio Garcés Ramírez
- Date of birth: 7 November 1972 (age 53)
- Place of birth: Mexico City, Mexico
- Height: 1.74 m (5 ft 9 in)
- Position: Midfielder

Senior career*
Years	Team	Apps	(Gls)
1994–1997	Cruz Azul	48	(3)
1998	Tecos	10	(0)
1998–1999	Guadalajara	2	(0)
1999–2003	Pachuca	117	(5)
2004–2005	Cruz Azul	22	(0)
Total		199	(8)

International career
2002	Mexico	5	(1)
- * Club domestic league appearances and goals

Marco Antonio Garcés Ramírez (born 7 November 1972) is a Mexican former professional footballer who played as a midfielder. He is currently serving as Director of Football Operations at Celta de Vigo.

== Career statistics ==
=== Club ===
As of 14 January 2021

Club	Season	League			Cup		Continental		Other		Total	
Club	Season	Division	Apps	Goals	Apps	Goals	Apps	Goals	Apps	Goals	Apps	Goals
Cruz Azul	1994–95	Primera División	5	0	–		–		0	0	5	0
Cruz Azul	1995–96	Primera División	10	0	–		–		0	0	10	0
Cruz Azul	1996–97	Primera División	25	3	–		–		0	0	25	3
Cruz Azul	1997–98	Primera División	8	0	–		–		0	0	8	0
Cruz Azul	Total		48	3	0	0	0	0	0	0	48	3
Tecos	1997–98	Primera División	10	0	–		–		0	0	10	0
Career total			58	3	0	0	0	0	0	0	58	3

=== International ===
National team	Year	Apps	Goals
Mexico	2002	5	1
Total		5	1

=== International goals ===
Scores and results list Mexico's goal tally first.

No	Date	Venue	Opponent	Score	Result	Competition
1.	20 January 2002	Rose Bowl, Los Angeles, California, United States	Guatemala	2–1	3–1	2002 CONCACAF Gold Cup
