= Jair García =

Mexican footballer (born 1978)

Personal information
- Full name: Jair García Gamboa
- Date of birth: 25 October 1978 (age 48)
- Place of birth: Guadalajara, Jalisco, Mexico
- Height: 1.76 m (5 ft 9 in)
- Position: Forward

Team information
- Current team: UAT (Liga TDP) (Manager)

Senior career*
Years	Team	Apps	(Gls)
1999–2000	Monterrey	1	(0)
2000–2004	Chivas	82	(13)
2004–2005	Puebla	31	(10)
2005–2006	Santos Laguna	23	(4)
2006–2007	Indios	16	(10)
2007	Atlas	15	(1)
2007–2014	Puebla	24	(2)
2008	→ Cruz Azul	4	(0)
2009	→ León	13	(1)
2009	→ Cruz Azul Hidalgo	12	(6)
2010	→ Indios	10	(2)
2010–2011	→ Cruz Azul Hidalgo	31	(13)
2011–2012	→ Lobos BUAP	21	(8)
2013–2014	→ Mérida	20	(9)
2014	Zacatepec	10	(4)
2014–2015	Altamira	2	(0)

International career
2001–2002	Mexico	3	(1)

Managerial career
- 2016–2018: Saltillo Soccer (Assistant)
- 2019–2020: Saltillo Soccer (Assistant)
- 2020: Saltillo (Assistant)
- 2020: Saltillo (Interim)
- 2021–2023: Saltillo
- 2023–: UAT (Liga TDP)
- * Club domestic league appearances and goals as of 11 November 2012

Jair García Gamboa (born 25 October 1978) is a Mexican former footballer who played as a forward.

== Club career ==
Garcia started his career with Monterrey, making his debut against Tigres in the Mexican Primera División on 27 February 1999. In 2000, he moved to Chivas Guadalajara, and then joined Puebla for the Clausura 2004 season. He subsequently had top-level spells with Santos Laguna (2005–06), Atlas (2007) and Cruz Azul (2008).

Prior to joining Lobos he played for Cruz Azul Hidalgo (2009 and 2010–11) and Indios de Ciudad Juárez (2010).

== International career ==
He made three appearances for the Mexico national football team between 2001 and 2002, scoring one goal.

=== International goals ===
No.	Date	Venue	Opponent	Score	Result	Competition	Ref.
1.	January 19, 2002	Pasadena, United States	El Salvador	1–0	Win	2002 CONCACAF Gold Cup	
