= Golman Pierre =

Haitian footballer (born 1971)

Personal information
- Date of birth: 21 February 1971 (age 55)
- Place of birth: Dessalines, Haiti
- Position: Striker

Senior career*
Years	Team	Apps	(Gls)
1995–2005	FICA		(109)

International career
1996–2003	Haiti	35	(23)
- * Club domestic league appearances and goals

Golman Pierre (born 21 February 1971) is a Haitian retired footballer who played as a striker.

== Club career ==
Pierre was born in Dessalines. He played his entire career in the Ligue Haïtienne for FICA (Football Inter Club Association), located in Cap-Haïtien, where he was one of the team's highest scorers. He totaled 109 goals for the club.

In 1998, he won his first national championship. The following season, he was the top goalscorer of the league with 19 goals. He also topped the goalscoring charts with 24 goals in FICA's 2001 championship winning season.

He retired in 2005 when FICA did not hold its position in the elite of Haitian football for the first time in his career when regulated to the Second Division. Late during his career, he was linked to many allegations of transfer to European-based teams but ultimately remained with FICA, where he won two national championships in a ten-year span.

== International career ==
Pierre made his national team debut in 1996 and was a Haiti squad member for the 2002 CONCACAF Gold Cup. He played in 11 FIFA World Cup qualification matches between 1996 and 2000 in which he scored an 15 goals, 12 of them in the 2002 qualifiers.

== Career statistics ==
=== International ===
Appearances and goals by national team and year
National team	Year	Apps	Goals
Haiti	1996	5	5
Haiti	1999	1	0
Haiti	2000	10	12
Haiti	2001	6	5
Haiti	2002	5	1
Haiti	2003	2	0
Total		29	23

Scores and results list Haiti's goal tally first, score column indicates score after each Pierre goal.

List of international goals scored by Golman Pierre
No.	Date	Venue	Opponent	Score	Result	Competition	Ref.
1	12 May 1996	Stade Sylvio Cator, Port-au-Prince, Haiti	Grenada	2–0	6–1	1998 FIFA World Cup qualification	
2	12 May 1996	Stade Sylvio Cator, Port-au-Prince, Haiti	Grenada	3–0	6–1	1998 FIFA World Cup qualification	
3	18 May 1996	National Cricket Stadium, St. George's, Grenada	Grenada	1–0	1–0	1998 FIFA World Cup qualification	
4	27 May 1996	Manny Ramjohn Stadium, Marabella, Trinidad and Tobago	Saint Vincent and the Grenadines	1–0	2–2	1996 Caribbean Cup	
5	27 May 1996	Manny Ramjohn Stadium, Marabella, Trinidad and Tobago	Saint Vincent and the Grenadines	2–0	2–2	1996 Caribbean Cup	
6	11 March 2000	Stade Sylvio Cator, Port-au-Prince, Haiti	Dominica	1–0	4–0	2002 FIFA World Cup qualification	
7	11 March 2000	Stade Sylvio Cator, Port-au-Prince, Haiti	Dominica	2–0	4–0	2002 FIFA World Cup qualification	
8	11 March 2000	Stade Sylvio Cator, Port-au-Prince, Haiti	Dominica	4–0	4–0	2002 FIFA World Cup qualification	
9	19 March 2000	Windsor Park, Roseau, Dominica	Dominica	1–1	3–1	2002 FIFA World Cup qualification	
10	19 March 2000	Windsor Park, Roseau, Dominica	Dominica	2–1	3–1	2002 FIFA World Cup qualification	
11	19 March 2000	Windsor Park, Roseau, Dominica	Dominica	3–1	3–1	2002 FIFA World Cup qualification	
12	1 April 2000	Stade Sylvio Cator, Port-au-Prince, Haiti	Bahamas	4–0	9–0	2002 FIFA World Cup qualification	
13	1 April 2000	Stade Sylvio Cator, Port-au-Prince, Haiti	Bahamas	6–0	9–0	2002 FIFA World Cup qualification	
14	16 April 2000	Thomas Robinson Stadium, Nassau, The Bahamas	Bahamas	3–0	4–0	2002 FIFA World Cup qualification	
15	16 April 2000	Thomas Robinson Stadium, Nassau, The Bahamas	Bahamas	4–0	4–0	2002 FIFA World Cup qualification	
16	7 May 2000	Hasely Crawford Stadium, Port of Spain, Trinidad and Tobago	Trinidad and Tobago	1–3	1–3	2002 FIFA World Cup qualification	
17	17 June 2000	Stade Sylvio Cator, Port-au-Prince, Haiti	Honduras	1–2	1–3	2002 FIFA World Cup qualification	
18	16 May 2001	Marvin Lee Stadium, Macoya, Trinidad and Tobago	Saint Kitts and Nevis	2–1	7–2	2001 Caribbean Cup	
19	16 May 2001	Marvin Lee Stadium, Macoya, Trinidad and Tobago	Saint Kitts and Nevis	4–1	7–2	2001 Caribbean Cup	
20	16 May 2001	Marvin Lee Stadium, Macoya, Trinidad and Tobago	Saint Kitts and Nevis	5–2	7–2	2001 Caribbean Cup	
21	16 May 2001	Marvin Lee Stadium, Macoya, Trinidad and Tobago	Saint Kitts and Nevis	6–2	7–2	2001 Caribbean Cup	
22	18 May 2001	Marvin Lee Stadium, Macoya, Trinidad and Tobago	Suriname	1–0	1–1	2001 Caribbean Cup	
23	26 January 2002	Miami Orange Bowl, Miami, United States	Costa Rica	1–1	1–2	2002 CONCACAF Gold Cup	
