= 2002 CONCACAF Gold Cup =

6th edition of the CONCACAF Gold Cup

CONCACAF Championship
- 2002 CONCACAF Gold Cup official logo

Tournament details
- Host country: United States
- Dates: January 18 – February 2
- Teams: 12 (from 3 confederations)
- Venues: 2 (in 2 host cities)

Final positions
- Champions: United States (2nd title)
- Runners-up: Costa Rica
- Third place: Canada
- Fourth place: South Korea

Tournament statistics
- Matches played: 20
- Goals scored: 39 (1.95 per match)
- Top scorer(s): (United States) Brian McBride (4 goals)
- Best player: (United States) Brian McBride
- Best goalkeeper: (Canada) Lars Hirschfeld
- Fair play award: Costa Rica

The 2002 CONCACAF Gold Cup was the sixth edition of the Gold Cup, the soccer championship of North America, Central America and the Caribbean (CONCACAF). This was the last Gold Cup to be played in an even-numbered year and in the first two months of a calendar year; since 2003 the tournament has been played every odd-numbered year's June and/or July.

The tournament was once again held in the United States, in Miami and Pasadena. The format of the tournament stayed the same as in 2000: twelve teams were split into four groups of three. The top two teams in each group would advance to the quarterfinals. Ecuador and South Korea were invited from outside CONCACAF.

Canada, who rode the coin toss all the way to winning the 2000 Cup, needed luck once again, as all games in Group D ended with a 2–0 result. Lots were drawn, with Canada and Haiti moving on to the next round; Ecuador did not. But the Canadian team's luck ran dry in the semifinals, as the U.S. beat them on penalties after tying 0–0. The United States then met Costa Rica in the final and topped them 2–0 behind goals by Josh Wolff and Jeff Agoos for their first tournament win since 1991.

During the tournament, Cuban players Alberto Delgado and Rey Ángel Martínez defected from Cuba to the United States.

== Qualified teams ==
Team	Qualification	Appearances	Last Appearance	Previous best performance	FIFA Ranking
North American zone
Mexico	Automatic	6th	2000	Champions (1993,1996, 1998)	9
United States	Automatic	6th	2000	Champions (1991)	24
Canada (TH)	Automatic	5th	2000	Champions (2000)	93
Caribbean zone qualified through the 2001 Caribbean Cup
Trinidad and Tobago	Winners	5th	2000	Third place (1993)	34
Haiti	Runners-up	2nd	2000	Group Stage (2000)	82
Martinique	Third Place	2nd	1993	Group Stage (1993)	N/A
Cuba	Playoff	2nd	1998	Group Stage (1998)	75
Central American zone qualified through the 2001 UNCAF Nations Cup
Guatemala	Winners	5th	2000	Fourth Place (1996)	59
Costa Rica	Runners-up	5th	2000	Third place (1993)	30
El Salvador	Third Place	3rd	1998	Group stage (1996, 1998)	86
Other
Ecuador	Invitation	1st	None	Debut	38
South Korea	Invitation	2nd	2000	Group stage (2000)	42

=== Qualification play-off ===
A qualification playoff to determine the final Gold Cup entrant was held in July and August 2001.

July 29, 2001

Panama	0–0	Cuba

Estadio Rommel Fernández, Panama City
Attendance: 10,000
Referee: Brian Hall (United States)

August 5, 2001

Cuba	1–0	Panama
Prado 79'

Estadio Pedro Marrero, Havana
Attendance: 6,000

Cuba won 1–0 on aggregate.

== Venues ==
Pasadena	Miami
Rose Bowl	Orange Bowl
Capacity: 93,000	Capacity: 74,000
Location of the host cities of the 2002 CONCACAF Gold Cup.

== Squads ==
The 12 national teams involved in the tournament were required to register a squad of 18 players; only players in these squads were eligible to take part in the tournament.

== Group stage ==
=== Group A ===
Pos	Team	Pld	W	D	L	GF	GA	GD	Pts	Qualification
1	Mexico	2	2	0	0	4	1	+3	6	Advance to Knockout stage
2	El Salvador	2	1	0	1	1	1	0	3	Advance to Knockout stage
3	Guatemala	2	0	0	2	1	4	−3	0	

January 19, 2002
13:00 UTC−8

El Salvador	0–1	Mexico
	Report	García 31'

Rose Bowl, Pasadena
Attendance: 42,117
Referee: Rogger Zambrano (Ecuador)

January 21, 2002
17:00 UTC−8

Mexico	3–1	Guatemala
Bautista 28'; Garcés 38'; Ochoa 90'	Report	Plata 36'

Rose Bowl, Pasadena
Attendance: 31,244
Referee: Peter Prendergast (Jamaica)

January 23, 2002
19:00 UTC−8

Guatemala	0–1	El Salvador
	Report	Cabrera 58'

Rose Bowl, Pasadena
Attendance: 12,906
Referee: Rogger Zambrano (Ecuador)

=== Group B ===
Pos	Team	Pld	W	D	L	GF	GA	GD	Pts	Qualification
1	United States	2	2	0	0	3	1	+2	6	Advance to Knockout stage
2	South Korea	2	0	1	1	1	2	−1	1	Advance to Knockout stage
3	Cuba	2	0	1	1	0	1	−1	1	

January 19, 2002
15:00 UTC−8

United States	2–1	South Korea
Donovan 35'; Beasley 90+3'	Report	Song Chong-gug 38'

Rose Bowl, Pasadena
Attendance: 42,117
Referee: Samuel Richard (Dominican Republic)

January 21, 2002
15:00 UTC−8

Cuba	0–1	United States
	Report	McBride 22' (pen.)

Rose Bowl, Pasadena
Attendance: 31,244
Referee: José Pineda (Honduras)

January 23, 2002
21:00 UTC−8

South Korea	0–0	Cuba
	Report

Rose Bowl, Pasadena
Attendance: 12,906
Referee: Noel Bynoe (Trinidad and Tobago)

=== Group C ===
Pos	Team	Pld	W	D	L	GF	GA	GD	Pts	Qualification
1	Costa Rica	2	1	1	0	3	1	+2	4	Advance to Knockout stage
2	Martinique	2	1	0	1	1	2	−1	3	Advance to Knockout stage
3	Trinidad and Tobago	2	0	1	1	1	2	−1	1	

January 18, 2002
19:00 UTC−5

Martinique	0–2	Costa Rica
	Report	Medford 38'; Fonseca 55'

Orange Bowl, Miami
Attendance: 14,508
Referee: Gilberto Alcalá (Mexico)

January 20, 2002
15:00 UTC−5

Costa Rica	1–1	Trinidad and Tobago
Fonseca 56'	Report	John 90'

Orange Bowl, Miami
Attendance: 12,253
Referee: Brian Hall (United States)

January 22, 2002
19:00 UTC−5

Trinidad and Tobago	0–1	Martinique
	Report	Percin 51'

Orange Bowl, Miami
Attendance: 3,827
Referee: Rodolfo Sibrián (El Salvador)

=== Group D ===
Pos	Team	Pld	W	D	L	GF	GA	GD	Pts	Qualification
1	Canada	2	1	0	1	2	2	0	3	Advance to Knockout stage
2	Haiti	2	1	0	1	2	2	0	3	Advance to Knockout stage
3	Ecuador	2	1	0	1	2	2	0	3	

January 18, 2002
21:00 UTC−5

Haiti	0–2	Canada
	Report	McKenna 28', 48'

Orange Bowl, Miami
Attendance: 14,508
Referee: Roberto Moreno (Panama)

January 20, 2002
17:00 UTC−5

Ecuador	0–2	Haiti
	Report	Méndez 6' (o.g.); Alerte 44'

Orange Bowl, Miami
Attendance: 12,253
Referee: Carlos Batres (Guatemala)

January 22, 2002
21:00 UTC−5

Canada	0–2	Ecuador
	Report	Aguinaga 88', 90'

Orange Bowl, Miami
Attendance: 3,827
Referee: Brian Hall United States)

== Knockout stage ==
Quarter-finals
January 26 – Miami
Costa Rica (a.s.d.e.t.)	2
Haiti	1
January 27 – Pasadena
Mexico	0 (2)
South Korea (p)	0 (4)
January 26 – Miami
Canada (p)	1 (6)
Martinique	1 (5)
January 27 – Pasadena
United States	4
El Salvador	0

Semi-finals
January 30 – Pasadena
Costa Rica	3
South Korea	1
January 30 – Pasadena
Canada	0 (2)
United States (p)	0 (4)

Final
February 2 – Pasadena
Costa Rica	0
United States	2
Third place
February 2 – Pasadena
Canada	2
South Korea	1

=== Quarterfinals ===
January 26, 2002
15:00 UTC−5

Costa Rica	2–1 (a.e.t./g.g.)	Haiti
Centeno 2'; Gómez 97'	Report	Pierre 62'

Orange Bowl, Miami
Attendance: 14,823
Referee: Gilberto Alcalá (Mexico)
January 26, 2002
17:30 UTC−5

Canada	1–1 (a.e.t.)	Martinique
McKenna 73'	Report	Rogers 63' (o.g.)
Penalties
McKenna (penalty scored); Brennan (penalty missed); De Rosario (penalty scored); Nsaliwa (penalty scored); De Vos (penalty scored); Stalteri (penalty scored); Bent (penalty scored)	6–5	(penalty scored) Lupon; (penalty scored) Clement; (penalty scored) DiCanot; (penalty scored) Mirande; (penalty missed) Reuperne; (penalty scored) Heurlie; (penalty missed) Lina

Orange Bowl, Miami
Attendance: 14,823
Referee: Carlos Batres (Guatemala)
January 27, 2002
12:00 UTC−8

Mexico	0–0 (a.e.t.)	South Korea
	Report
Penalties
Noriega (penalty scored); De Anda (penalty scored); Sosa (penalty missed); Hierro (penalty missed)	2–4	(penalty scored) Lee Eul-yong; (penalty scored) Lee Dong-gook; (penalty scored) Choi Sung-yong; (penalty scored) Lee Young-pyo

Rose Bowl, Pasadena
Attendance: 31,628
Referee: José Pineda (Honduras)
January 27, 2002
14:30 UTC−8

United States	4–0	El Salvador
McBride 9', 11', 21'; Razov 72'	Report

Rose Bowl, Pasadena
Attendance: 31,628
Referee: Samuel Richard (Dominican Republic)

=== Semifinals ===
January 30, 2002
18:00 UTC−8

Costa Rica	3–1	South Korea
Gomez 44'; Wanchope 77', 82'	Report	Choi Jin-cheul 81'

Rose Bowl, Pasadena
Attendance: 7,241
Referee: Sibrian (SLV)
January 30, 2002
20:30 UTC−8

Canada	0–0 (a.e.t.)	United States
	Report
Penalties
McKenna (penalty missed); Stalteri (penalty scored); De Rosario (penalty scored); Nsaliwa (penalty missed)	2–4	(penalty scored) Donovan; (penalty scored) McBride; (penalty scored) Agoos; (penalty scored) Mathis

Rose Bowl, Pasadena
Attendance: 7,241
Referee: Prendergast (JAM)

=== Third place match ===
February 2, 2002
10:00 UTC−8

Canada	2–1	South Korea
Kim Do-hoon 34' (o.g.); De Rosario 35'	Report	Kim Do-hoon 15'

Rose Bowl, Pasadena
Attendance: 14,432
Referee: Noel Bynoe (Trinidad and Tobago)

=== Final ===
February 2, 2002
12:00 UTC−8

United States	2–0	Costa Rica
Wolff 37'; Agoos 63'	Report

Rose Bowl, Pasadena
Attendance: 14,432
Referee: Carlos Batres (Guatemala)

== Awards ==
2002 Gold Cup winners

United States
Second title

The following awards were given at the conclusion of the tournament.

- Most Valuable Player: (United States) Brian McBride
- Top Goalkeeper: (Canada) Lars Hirschfeld
- Fair Play Trophy: Costa Rica

=== Best XI ===
Goalkeeper	Defenders	Midfielders	Forwards	Reserves
(Cuba) Odelín Molina	(Costa Rica) Luis Marín (Canada) Jason de Vos (United States) Jeff Agoos	(United States) Landon Donovan (South Korea) Kim Nam-il (Mexico) Luis Alfonso Sosa (Costa Rica) Mauricio Solís (Costa Rica) Rónald Gómez	(United States) Brian McBride (Canada) Kevin McKenna	(Trinidad and Tobago) Shaka Hislop (Martinique) Ludovic Mirande (Haiti) Pierre Bruny (El Salvador) Santos Cabrera (Ecuador) Álex Aguinaga (El Salvador) Ronald Cerritos (Guatemala) Juan Carlos Plata

== Statistics ==
=== Goalscorers ===
4 goals

- (United States) Brian McBride

3 goals

- (Canada) Kevin McKenna

2 goals

- (Costa Rica) Rolando Fonseca
- (Costa Rica) Rónald Gómez
- (Costa Rica) Paulo Wanchope
- (Ecuador) Álex Aguinaga

1 goal

- (Canada) Dwayne De Rosario
- (Costa Rica) Walter Centeno
- (Costa Rica) Hernán Medford
- (El Salvador) Santos Cabrera
- (Guatemala) Juan Carlos Plata
- (Haiti) Charles Alerte
- (Haiti) Golman Pierre
- (Martinique) Patrick Percin
- (Mexico) Adolfo Bautista
- (Mexico) Marco Garcés
- (Mexico) Jair García
- (Mexico) Carlos Ochoa
- (South Korea) Choi Jin-cheul
- (South Korea) Kim Do-hoon
- (South Korea) Song Chong-gug
- (Trinidad and Tobago) Stern John
- (United States) Jeff Agoos
- (United States) DaMarcus Beasley
- (United States) Landon Donovan
- (United States) Ante Razov
- (United States) Josh Wolff

Own goals

- (Canada) Mark Rogers (for Martinique)
- (South Korea) Kim Do-hoon (for Canada)
- (Ecuador) Édison Méndez (for Haiti)
