= Rey Ángel Martínez =

Cuban footballer (born 1980)

Rey Ángel Martinez
Personal information
- Full name: Rey Ángel Martínez Mendivel
- Date of birth: May 13, 1980 (age 46)
- Place of birth: Havana, Cuba
- Height: 1.85 m (6 ft 1 in)
- Position: Midfielder

Senior career*
Years	Team	Apps	(Gls)
1998–2003	Ciudad la Habana		
2004	Colorado Rapids	7	(0)
2005–2008	Rochester Rhinos	60	(8)
2005–2006	St. Louis Steamers (indoor)	2	(0)
2006–2008	Baltimore Blast (indoor)	43	(10)
2008	Carolina RailHawks	5	(1)
2008–2009	New Jersey Ironmen (indoor)	20	(13)
2009	Real Maryland Monarchs	4	(0)
2009–2010	Philadelphia KiXX (indoor)	11	(3)
2011–2012	Rochester Lancers (indoor)	37	(9)
2013	Syracuse Silver Knights (indoor)	5	(0)

International career
2000–2002	Cuba	17	(0)
- * Club domestic league appearances and goals as of Summer 2012

Rey Ángel "Boom-Boom" Martínez (born May 13, 1980) is a Cuban footballer who most recently played for the Syracuse Silver Knights.

== Career ==
=== Professional ===
Martínez began his career with Ciudad la Habana in his native Cuba, before defecting to the United States during the 2002 Gold Cup along with his national teammate Alberto Delgado. Martínez joined the Colorado Rapids of Major League Soccer on June 11, 2004, and finished his first year with the Rapids with one assist in seven appearances (three starts), but struggled with injuries for much of the season. He was released by the Rapids before the 2005 season and signed with Rochester Rhinos of the USL First Division. Martínez was used regularly as a late second-half attacking substitute, and went on to make 60 appearances for the Rhinos until August 2008, when he signed for the Carolina RailHawks for the rest of the season. In the fall of 2005, he moved indoors with the St. Louis Steamers. When the Steamers withdrew from the league during the summer of 2006, the Baltimore Blast selected Martinez in the third round of the dispersal draft. He played two seasons in Baltimore. On November 6, 2008, Martinez signed with the New Jersey Ironmen in the Xtreme Soccer League., and played for them for two seasons before returning to outdoor soccer with the Real Maryland Monarchs in the USL Second Division for the 2009 season.

In 2011, Martinez signed with the Rochester Lancers of the MISL.

=== International ===
He made his international debut for Cuba in a June 2000 FIFA World Cup qualification against Canada and has earned a total of 17 caps, scoring no goals. He represented his country in the Gold Cup, Copa Caribe, and Pan American Games.

His final international was a January 2002 CONCACAF Gold Cup match against South Korea.
