= Théodore Antonin =

French football manager

Personal information
- Place of birth: France

Managerial career
- Years: Team
- 1998–2001: Martinique (assistant)
- 2002–2003: Martinique

Théodore Antonin is a French professional football manager.

It is one of the personalities of Martinique football. From 1998 to 2001 he was assistant coach of the Martinique national football team, led by Saint-Hubert Reine Adélaïde. He participated in the Caribbean Cup during the 1998 and 2001 editions.

Then in 2002, he became the head coach for the second participation of Martinique in the Gold Cup, he managed to reach the quarter-finals, which is the best performance of Martinique. In 2003, he managed to qualify again, but the team was eliminated in the first round.

It invests in Martinique soccer as president of the friendly football educators Martinique.
