= Charles Alerte =

Haitian footballer (born 1982)

Personal information
- Date of birth: 22 July 1982 (age 44)
- Place of birth: Jean-Rabel, Haiti
- Position: Forward

Senior career*
Years	Team	Apps	(Gls)
2001–2002	Aigle Noir	23	(6)
2002	Arsenal de Sarandí	0	(0)
2002–2006	Aigle Noir		

International career
2002	Haiti U23		
2002	Haiti	3	(1)
- * Club domestic league appearances and goals

Charles Alerte (born 22 July 1982) is a Haitian former footballer.

== Club career ==
After six goals in twenty-three games during the 2001–02 Ligue Haïtienne season, Alerte trialled with Argentine club Arsenal de Sarandí alongside compatriot Jean-Jacques Pierre. Though he registered with the AFA, he never featured in a competitive fixture for the club.

== International career ==
Alerte scored his only goal for the Haitian national team in a 2–0 2002 CONCACAF Gold Cup win against Ecuador.

== Career statistics ==
=== International ===
Appearances and goals by national team and year
National team	Year	Apps	Goals
Haiti	2002	3	1
Total		3	1

=== International goals ===
Scores and results list Haiti's goal tally first, score column indicates score after each Alerte goal.

List of international goals scored by Charles Alerte
No.	Date	Venue	Opponent	Score	Result	Competition
1	19 January 2002	Orange Bowl, Miami, Florida, United States	Ecuador	2–0	2–0	2002 CONCACAF Gold Cup
