= Stokely Mason =

Trinidad and Tobago footballer

Stokely Mason (born 24 October 1975 in Barataria) is a former football midfielder from Trinidad and Tobago who last played for United Petrotrin.

== Career ==
Mason spent his entire career in Trinidad and Tobago, except for brief spells in Costa Rica and England.

== International career ==
He got 61 caps and scored 4 goals for the national team between 1996 and 2004.

== Clubs ==
- (Trinidad and Tobago) Malta Carib Alcons (1993–1995)
- (Trinidad and Tobago) Joe Public F.C. (1996–2000; 2001; 2002)
- (Trinidad and Tobago) Caledonia AIA Fire (2000; 2005)
- (Costa Rica) C.D. Saprissa (2001–2002)
- (Trinidad and Tobago) W Connection (2003)
- (Trinidad and Tobago) San Juan Jabloteh (2004)
- (Trinidad and Tobago) North East Stars (2006–2008)
- (Trinidad and Tobago) United Petrotrin (2009)
