= Tam Nsaliwa =

Former soccer player (born 1982)

Personal information
- Full name: Tamandani Wazayo Phillip Nsaliwa
- Date of birth: 28 January 1982 (age 44)
- Place of birth: Lilongwe, Malawi
- Height: 1.78 m (5 ft 10 in)
- Position: Midfielder

Youth career
- 1997–1998: Edmonton Northwest United
- 1998–1999: Energie Cottbus
- 1999–2000: Edmonton Northwest United

Senior career*
Years	Team	Apps	(Gls)
2000–2001	1. FC Nürnberg	3	(0)
2001–2003	1. FC Saarbrücken	43	(0)
2003–2004	Jahn Regensburg	25	(1)
2004–2006	1. FC Saarbrücken	64	(0)
2006–2007	Panionios	27	(2)
2007–2010	AEK Athens	45	(0)
2009–2010	→ Lillestrøm SK (loan)	6	(1)
2011–2012	Ponferradina	7	(0)
2012	Esbjerg fB	6	(0)
2012–2013	Kavala	13	(0)
2013–2015	Bucaspor	52	(3)

International career
2001–2008	Canada	13	(0)
Medal record
Representing Canada
Men's soccer
CONCACAF Gold Cup
Third place	2002 United States
- * Club domestic league appearances and goals

Tamandani Wazayo Phillip Nsaliwa (born 28 January 1982) is a former professional soccer player who played as a midfielder. Born in Malawi, he represented Canada at international level.

== Club career ==
=== Early years ===
Nsaliwa was born in Lilongwe, Malawi. He moved to Edmonton some years after he played for local youth side Edmonton Southwest United. Apparently this was the first boys team in club history to advance to the Under-15 National Championships, finishing fourth in the competition. He then played for Edmonton North West United and represented the Alberta Soccer Association in all its subsequent youth select teams before moving to Germany at the age of 16.

=== Germany ===
Nsaliwa moved to Germany where he played for the Energie Cottbus youth program for one season, returned to Canada for one year and then back again to Germany to sign with 2. Bundesliga outfit 1. FC Nürnberg. While he only played a minor part, he won the league title to clinch promotion to the Bundesliga. However, unhappy in Nürnberg, he moved on to 1. FC Saarbrücken and carried on to play on the second level for five more years, including one season at Jahn Regensburg. He would go on to relinquish his Canadian citizenship to become a citizen of Germany (where he spent seven years) in 2007 to avoid local rules limiting the number of non-EU internationals permitted in a team.

=== Greece ===
In 2006, he was lured to Super League Greece side Panionios by their new German manager Ewald Lienen and enjoyed his first season of top league soccer. In his first and only season at the club, as co-captain, he would go on to help them place fifth in the league ranking and thus securing a UEFA Cup position for the following year for only the second time in the club's history. He did this with his second goal of the season on the final day of the season against local giants AEK Athens. Prior to the match it had been publicly speculated that he had already signed for AEK in that mid–season, although he was also being publicly courted but the two other Greek soccer giants, Olympiacos and Panathinaikos. Some days after that game he went on to announce that he would join AEK Athens on a three-year contract.

=== AEK Athens ===
In his first season at AEK Athens, Nsaliwa would quickly win the affections of the supporters with his performance against Sevilla in the Champions League Qualifying stage playing alongside Champions League runner–up, Akis Zikos and World Cup champion, Rivaldo. Although AEK did not advance he was singled out as a shining player for the team in the series and expectations had been placed on him based on it.

That season the club would be crowned "The Unofficial Champions of Greece" after a disputed Championship won by Olympiacos. The championship was handed to Olympiacos after the Greek Football Federation found an Austrian player (Vagner) from Apollon Kalamarias had played a game against the club illegally and thus awarded Olympiacos the three points that would subsequently take them two points above AEK FC and elude the club of yet another championship after 13 years.

In his first UEFA cup season with AEK, Nsaliwa went on to score the lone goal against FK Mladá Boleslav that subsequently saw AEK advance to the knock-out stage. Despite losing the following game to Villarreal at home, the goal proved to be the difference in AEK moving on to the next round. He would also go on to receive MVP of the last game of the season against Panathinaikos FC with a long range goal that tied the game at 1–1.

The following season, after a personally very bad start, again Nsaliwa would play a major role in AEK's third-place finish to the season as well as be a part of the "Game of the Century" in the Greek cup final against Olympiacos. The match would go on to end 3–3, lasted more than three hours with two extra times and 19 penalty shots, with Nsaliwa scoring both of his, but AEK losing the game.

Nsaliwa's third season at AEK started and ended questionably. Struggling with playing time and injuries, it was discovered at mid-season that he had a falling out with the head coach of the club Dušan Bajević and he would go on to state in Greek news "I played a major role in the last four games before the Christmas break and then when I returned I never trained with the team again."

No insight has been given as to exactly what happened, but after an unsuccessful transfer period in which he refused to join several other Greek teams, Romanian club Rapid București and was speculated to have interest from a Premier League club, Nsaliwa signed a loan contract with the Norwegian top flight club Lillestrøm SK, a month after the end of the 2009–10 winter transfer period, which was to last until June 2010.

Before leaving, there was speculation in Greek news that the president of AEK tried to stop the loan transfer and have Nsaliwa stay, but it was later made clear that there was no relationship left between the player and coach.

AEK would go on to write on its website "AEk FC would like to thank Tamandani Nsaliwa for his services to the club and wish him the best of luck in his future career."

=== Spain ===
After a rather mediocre loan spell in Norway, Nsaliwa was said to have signed for Spanish side Real Betis.

With the public backing of current Vice President of RCD Mallorca, former Betis coach and a former coach of Nsaliwa at AEK, Lorenzo Serra Ferrer. Although it is not well known what happened in the time Nsaliwa was in Seville to finish the agreement, according to the official website of Real Betis, it was stated that "Nsaliwa will not play in the club because there was no economic agreement between both parties." After this, the player decided to sue the club for the amount he claimed was the agreed contractual sum of €900,000.

After six months of being without a club, in January 2011 he went on to sign for SD Ponferradina in the Spanish Second Division.

=== Denmark ===
On 16 April 2012, it was announced that Nsaliwa had signed with Esbjerg fB of the Danish 1st Division until 30 June 2012.

== International career ==
Nsaliwa played at the 2001 FIFA World Youth Championship in Argentina, alongside Julian De Guzman and Mike Klukowski among others.

He made his senior debut for Canada in an April 2001 LG Cup match against Egypt and earned a total of 13 caps, scoring no goals. He has not yet represented Canada in FIFA World Cup qualification matches but did play a game at the 2001 Confederations Cup and three at the 2002 CONCACAF Gold Cup.

His last full international game for Canada was played against the Brazil at Qwest Field in Seattle on 31 May 2008.

Once he renounced his Canadian citizenship in 2007, he became ineligible to play for Canada, and in fact no longer eligible to play international soccer, as he had been cap-tied by Canada.

== Personal life ==
After he represented the Canada national team at full international level, Nsaliwa renounced his Canadian citizenship to become a citizen of Germany in 2007 to avoid local rules limiting the number of non-EU internationals permitted in a team.

On 14 June 2020, he released the song "Sklira", in honor of the new stadium of his former club AEK Athens. The song got over 90,000 views on YouTube within three days. He has also sung "Tsili Kafeneio".

== Honours ==
1. FC Nürnberg

- 2. Bundesliga: 2000–01

Canada

- CONCACAF Gold Cup: 3rd place, 2002

Canada U-20

- Concacaf runner-up: 2000
