= Fabrice Reuperné =

Martiniquais footballer (born 1975)

Personal information
- Date of birth: 18 September 1975 (age 51)
- Place of birth: Saint-Pierre, Martinique
- Height: 1.80 m (5 ft 11 in)
- Positions: Defender; midfielder

Team information
- Current team: Golden Star
- Number: 6

Youth career
- Boissy St Leger
- Assaut de Saint-Pierre
- Club Franciscain

Senior career*
| Years | Team | Apps | (Gls) |
| 2001–2002 | Stade Reims | 10 | (0) |
| 2002–2004 | SO Romorantin | 59 | (3) |
| 2004–2005 | AS Cannes | 28 | (1) |
| 2005–2006 | Clermont Foot | 16 | (0) |
| 2006–2007 | PAS Giannina | 12 | (0) |
| 2007–2010 | Kerkyra | 53 | (4) |
| 2010–2011 | Golden Star | | |

International career
| 2002–2013 | Martinique | 25 | (2) |
- * Club domestic league appearances and goals

Fabrice Reuperne (born September 18, 1975) is a Martiniquais former footballer.

Reuperne played for the Martinique national football team at the 2002 CONCACAF Gold Cup finals, helping the team reach the quarterfinals. At the 2013 CONCACAF Gold Cup he scored the winning goal against Canada in Martinique's opening match, a long range blast in the 93rd minute.

== Personal life ==
Reuperné is the father of the Martinique international footballer Enrick Reuperné.

== International ==
=== International goals ===
Scores and results list Martinique's goal tally first.

| No | Date | Venue | Opponent | Score | Result | Competition |
|---|---|---|---|---|---|---|
| 1. | 30 March 2003 | Independence Park, Kingston, Jamaica | Saint Lucia | 3–4 | 5–4 | 2003 CONCACAF Gold Cup qualification |
| 2. | 7 July 2013 | Rose Bowl, Pasadena, USA | Canada | 1–0 | 1–0 | 2013 CONCACAF Gold Cup |
