= Kevin McKenna (soccer) =

Canadian former professional soccer player (born 1980)

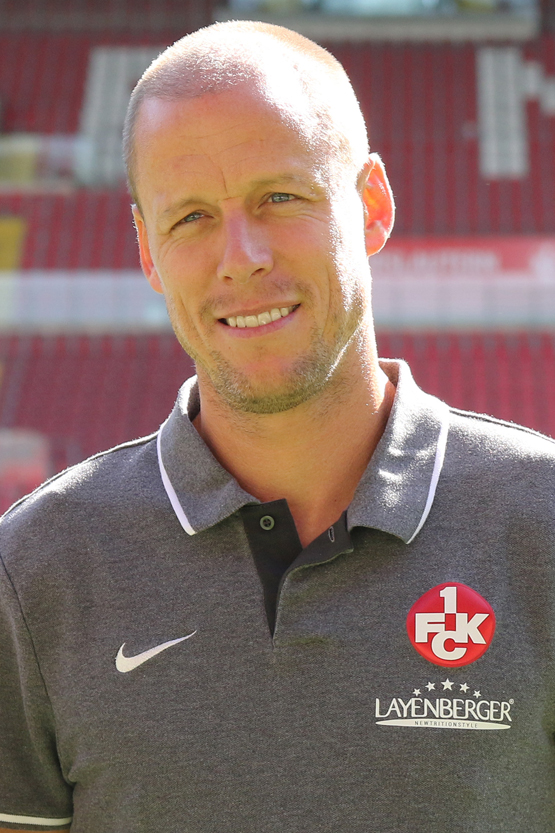
- McKenna in 2019

Personal information
- Full name: Kevin James McKenna
- Date of birth: 21 January 1980 (age 46)
- Place of birth: Calgary, Alberta, Canada
- Height: 1.92 m (6 ft 4 in)
- Position: Centre back

Youth career
- 1990–1995: Calgary Foothills
- 1995–1998: Calgary Dinos

Senior career*
Years	Team	Apps	(Gls)
1998–2001	Energie Cottbus	5	(0)
2001	→ Heart of Midlothian (loan)	8	(0)
2001–2005	Heart of Midlothian	114	(21)
2005–2007	Energie Cottbus	63	(10)
2007–2014	1. FC Köln	141	(11)
Total		331	(42)

International career
2000	Canada U23	5	(0)
2000–2012	Canada	63	(11)

Managerial career
- 2019: 1. FC Köln II (caretaker)
Medal record
Representing Canada
Men's soccer
CONCACAF Gold Cup
Third place	2002 United States
- * Club domestic league appearances and goals

Kevin James McKenna (born 21 January 1980) is a Canadian former professional soccer player who played as a centre back and current assistant manager of Bundesliga club 1. FC Köln. Occasionally, he also played as a central midfielder or striker.

== Club career ==
McKenna began to play with soccer 1990 in the academy team of Calgary Foothills and was promoted to the senior team in 1991. He was selected for the Alberta Provincial Under 15 team in 1995 and won the Canadian National Championships with them that year. Owen Hargreaves was also part of that Alberta team.

=== Energie Cottbus ===
After playing with Calgary Foothills as an amateur, McKenna played three seasons (the first two in the reserves) with German Bundesliga side Energie Cottbus. In the first game of the 2000–01 season, McKenna and international teammate Paul Stalteri simultaneously became the first Canadians to play in the German Bundesliga in a match between McKenna's newly promoted Cottbus and Stalteri's Werder Bremen.

=== Hearts ===
In 2001, McKenna moved to Scottish Premier League team Hearts on loan, playing eight games for the Edinburgh club. After a £300,000 transfer that summer, McKenna was the club's second leading scorer in the 2001–02 season with nine goals in 35 games. As a mostly reserve striker in 2002–03, McKenna scored six in 41. He also scored five goals in 38 games in 2003–04. After falling out of favour at Hearts in 2005, McKenna returned to Energie Cottbus. He was elected as the club's new captain after the departure of former skipper Gregg Berhalter.

=== 1. FC Köln ===
In the summer of 2007, McKenna signed a four-year contract with 1. FC Köln, dropping down a division to the 2. Bundesliga. McKenna made his debut for his new team on 10 August 2007, in a 2–0 away win against FC St. Pauli. Several weeks later, McKenna scored his first goal for the club on 5 October in a 4–1 home victory over Kickers Offenbach. He helped Köln to promotion into the top flight in his first season with the club.

McKenna scored his first goal in the 2010–11 season in a 4–2 away loss to powerhouse Werder Bremen on 28 August, the other goal scored by teammate Lukas Podolski. Weeks later during the month of September, McKenna had surgery done on his knee and was labeled out indefinitely, however he made a faster recovery then originally anticipated and returned to the first team in early December. He did not see any playing time until being subbed on in the 75th minute to Schalke 04 on 19 December, the game ended as a 3–0 loss.

McKenna made his 2011–12 debut as a starter on 13 August against Schalke in the team's second game of the season, it ended as a 5–1 away loss. Two weeks later Mckenna scored his first goal of the season and the winning goal to beat Hamburger SV in a thrilling 4–3 away victory.

== International career ==
McKenna made his debut for Canada in a May 2000 friendly match against Trinidad and Tobago. By November 2009, he has earned a total of 46 caps, scoring nine goals. He has represented Canada in four FIFA World Cup qualification matches. McKenna has been a regular for the Canadian national team since 2002, when he featured in the CONCACAF Gold Cup as a target man for Holger Osieck's side. McKenna scored three goals, including a brace over Haiti in the first round.

McKenna earned his 50th cap for team Canada in a friendly against Ecuador prior to the 2011 CONCACAF Gold Cup, the game ended in a 2–2 home draw at BMO Field. McKenna was named the captain for Canada during the Gold Cup with Paul Stalteri not in the tournament roster.

=== International goals ===
Scores and results list Canada's goal tally first, score column indicates score after each McKenna goal.

List of international goals scored by Kevin McKenna
No.	Date	Venue	Cap	Opponent	Score	Result	Competition
1	30 May 2000	Winnipeg Soccer Complex, Winnipeg, Canada	2	Honduras	2–1	2–1	Friendly
2	18 January 2002	Orange Bowl, Miami, United States	8	Haiti	1–0	2–0	2002 CONCACAF Gold Cup
3	18 January 2002	Orange Bowl, Miami, United States	8	Haiti	2–0	2–0	2002 CONCACAF Gold Cup
4	26 January 2002	Orange Bowl, Miami, United States	10	Martinique	1–1	1–1	2002 CONCACAF Gold Cup
5	12 February 2003	11 June Stadium, Tripoli, Libya	14	Libya	1–0	4–2	Friendly
6	1 June 2003	Volkswagen Arena, Wolfsburg, Germany	16	Germany	1–0	1–4	Friendly
7	13 June 2004	Richardson Stadium, Kingston, Canada	23	Belize	3–0	4–0	2006 World Cup qualification
8	26 March 2005	Estádio Cidade de Barcelos, Barcelos, Portugal	27	Portugal	1–3	1–4	Friendly
9	25 July 2005	Swangard Stadium, Burnaby, Canada	28	Honduras	1–2	1–2	Friendly
10	7 September 2010	Saputo Stadium, Montreal, Canada	48	Honduras	2–1	2–1	Friendly
11	29 February 2012	Tsirio Stadium, Limassol, Cyprus	56	Armenia	1–0	1–3	Friendly

== Coaching career ==
After retiring, McKenna started his coaching career as assistant manager for 1. FC Köln's U19 squad. He was then, alongside Markus Daun, assistant coach under head coach Stefan Ruthenbeck on an interim basis 1. FC Köln's Bundesliga team in December 2017, before becoming assistant coach of André Pawlak on the second team of 1. FC Köln in the summer of 2018. After Pawlak was appointed manager for the Bundesliga team in late April 2019, McKenna took over on an interim basis as head coach for the second team in the Regionalliga West. In July 2019, McKenna left the club because he saw no prospect of a position as head coach in the youth area for the foreseeable future.

On 19 September 2019, McKenna was appointed assistant manager of 1. FC Kaiserslautern under the new head coach Boris Schommers. In 2021, he returned to Köln as an assistant coach to Steffen Baumgart. until May 2024 when a disappointing end to the season led to relegation and the team let the contracts of the entire coaching staff expire. In September 2024, McKenna was appointed assistant manager at Hamburger SV, once again under chief trainer Steffen Baumgart. The time at HSV proved to be short-lived as McKenna was fired along with Baumgart and the entire trainer team in December 2025. McKenna followed Baumgart to FC Union Berlin in December 2025 and was relieved of duties by the team in April 2026 when Baumgart was sacked. On 26 June 2026. McKenna returned to 1. FC Köln as assistant manager to René Wagner.

== Career statistics ==
As of match played 19 May 2019

Team	From	To	Record					Ref.
Team	From	To	G	W	D	L	Win %	Ref.
1. FC Köln II	28 April 2019	30 June 2019	3	2	0	1	66.67	
Total			3	2	0	1	66.67	—

== Honours ==
=== Player ===
Canada

- CONCACAF Gold Cup: 3rd place, 2002

1. FC Köln

- 2. Bundesliga: 2013–14

=== Individual ===
- CONCACAF Gold Cup Best XI: 2002
- Canada Soccer Hall of Fame: 2019 Inductee
