= Mark Rogers (soccer) =

Canadian soccer player and coach

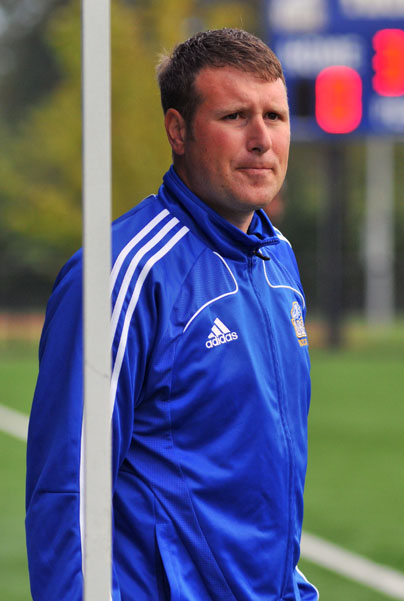

Personal information
- Date of birth: November 3, 1975 (age 51)
- Place of birth: Guelph, Ontario, Canada
- Height: 6 ft 1 in (1.85 m)
- Position: Defender

Youth career
- Tsawwassen Soccer Club
- 1994–1997: UBC Thunderbirds

Senior career*
Years	Team	Apps	(Gls)
1996–1998	Burnaby Canadians		
1998–2003	Wycombe Wanderers	139	(4)
2004	→ Stevenage Borough (loan)	4	(0)
2004–2006	Stevenage Borough	16	(0)

International career^{‡}
2000–2003	Canada	7	(0)

Managerial career
- 2010–2012: UBC Thunderbird Women
- 2013: Canada - Assistant (Interim)
Medal record
Representing Canada
Men's soccer
CONCACAF Gold Cup
Third place	2002 United States
- * Club domestic league appearances and goals as of 3 December 2009 ‡ National team caps and goals as of 3 December 2009

Mark Rogers (born November 3, 1975) is a Canadian soccer coach and former player. He represented Canada as a member of the national team. Rogers was born in Guelph, Ontario.

== Club career ==
While at university in Vancouver, Rogers played for Burnaby Canadians. In February 1999 he signed for Wycombe Wanderers after initially being refused a work permit. He had five seasons with the Chairboys, then played on loan for Stevenage Borough for whom he signed permanently in April 2004. In 2005, he retired at 30 years of age, due to knee and back injuries.

== International career ==
He made his debut for Canada in an October 2000 World Cup qualification match against Panama and went on to earn a total of 7 caps, scoring no goals. He has represented Canada in 1 FIFA World Cup qualification match. He played at the 2002 CONCACAF Gold Cup. He did score an own goal in this tournament against Martinique.

His final international was a November 2003 friendly match against the Republic of Ireland.

Rogers left his role as head coach of the University of British Columbia Women's Soccer Team in 2010 and accepted the role of Interim Assistant Coach for the Canadian Men's National Team, working under Colin Miller. Rogers is currently the Managing Director of Vancouver Football Club, of the Canadian Premier League.

== Honours ==
Canada

- CONCACAF Gold Cup: 3rd place, 2002
