= Jason de Vos =

Canadian soccer player

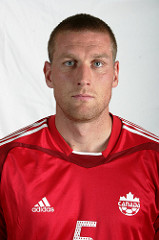
- de Vos in 2004

Personal information
- Full name: Jason Richard de Vos
- Date of birth: January 2, 1974 (age 52)
- Place of birth: London, Ontario, Canada
- Height: 6 ft 4 in (1.93 m)
- Position: Centre back

Senior career*
Years	Team	Apps	(Gls)
1990	London Lasers	6	(0)
1991	Kitchener Kickers	16	(1)
1992	London Lasers	19	(2)
1993–1996	Montreal Impact	55	(3)
1996–1998	Darlington	44	(5)
1998–2001	Dundee United	93	(2)
2001–2004	Wigan Athletic	90	(15)
2004–2008	Ipswich Town	171	(10)
Total		453	(35)

International career
1997–2004	Canada	49	(4)

Managerial career
- 2016: Canada (women) (assistant)
- 2019–2022: Canada (assistant)
- 2024–: Toronto FC (assistant)
Medal record
Representing Canada
Men's soccer
CONCACAF Gold Cup
Winner	2000 United States
Third place	2002 United States
- * Club domestic league appearances and goals

Jason Richard de Vos (born January 2, 1974) is a Canadian soccer executive, coach, and former player who currently serves as an assistant coach with Toronto FC in Major League Soccer. While representing his country, he was part of the national team that won the 2000 CONCACAF Gold Cup.

== Club career ==
=== Early career ===
Jason de Vos began his professional career in 1990 as a 15-year-old high schooler with hometown club the London Lasers of the former Canadian Soccer League (CSL). When the club folded he joined the Kitchener Kickers, also of the CSL. When the latter club also folded he rejoined the re-established Lasers in 1992, the last year of operations for the CSL.

=== Montreal Impact ===
Known for his ability in the air, De Vos spent the next five seasons with the Montreal Impact of the then American Professional Soccer League, the last two on loan to English Third Division club Darlington.

=== Career abroad ===
In 1998, De Vos first signed a contract with Darlington before moving to Dundee United of the Scottish Premier League in October on a £400,000 transfer. He spent three seasons with The Terrors, captaining the side in 2000–01. He was then signed by Wigan Athletic of the then English Second Division for £500,000 in 2001. De Vos captained the side to its promotion to the First Division in 2002–03 and was named in that season's PFA Division Two Team of the Year. Following an injury-plagued 2003–04, which saw Wigan just miss out on a Premier League play-off place, De Vos left on a Bosman transfer and joined Ipswich Town. Since joining Ipswich, he held down a regular place in the centre of defence, often playing through many injuries and even captaining the team in Jim Magilton's absence. In June 2006, Magilton was appointed manager of Ipswich Town and made de Vos the new captain. He retired from club and international soccer in 2008.

== International career ==
De Vos represented Canada at the 1991 Pan American Games. He appeared in 49 full internationals, scoring four goals. He debuted on August 19, 1997, in a 1–0 home loss friendly to Iran. He has represented Canada in 11 FIFA World Cup qualification matches and played at the 2001 Confederations Cup. He captained the Canadian team from 1999 until his retirement from international soccer in 2004. De Vos was named a tournament all-star for both the 2000 and 2002 CONCACAF Gold Cup tournaments, in which Canada were placed first and third respectively. He scored the winning goal in the final of the 2000 Gold Cup, a match Canada won 2–0 over Colombia.

== Retirement ==
After the final match of the 2007–08 season in the 1–0 win over Hull City, De Vos announced his immediate retirement from playing to take up a media role in his native Canada and was given a guard of honour and standing ovation during the teams parade lap of the pitch.

De Vos will also scout players from the MLS for former-club Ipswich Town.

De Vos provided commentary on the FIFA 2010 World Cup for CBC and on Toronto FC matches for CBC and GolTV Canada.

De Vos was the colour Commentator for CBC Sports's coverage of Football at the 2008 Summer Olympics in Beijing, China.

Fall of 2010 he accepted the position of Technical Director at Oakville Soccer Club.

On May 4, de Vos stepped down as Technical Director at Oakville Soccer Club after accepting a full-time position with TSN as a broadcaster.

In 2012, as part of the Canadian Soccer Association's centennial celebration, he was named to the all-time Canada XI men's team.

Since April 2013 is de Vos Member of the Canadian Soccer Hall of Fame.

In January 2015, de Vos confirmed that he would begin work towards his UEFA Pro Licence in May of that year in Ireland.

On August 30, 2016, he was named the Director of Development for the Canadian Soccer Association.

In January 2024, he joined Toronto FC as an assistant coach.

== Career statistics ==
=== Club ===
Appearances and goals by club, season and competition
Club	Season	League			National cup		League cup		Other		Total	
Club	Season	Division	Apps	Goals	Apps	Goals	Apps	Goals	Apps	Goals	Apps	Goals
Darlington	1996–97	Third Division	8	0	1	0	0	0	0	0	9	0
Darlington	1997–98	Third Division	24	3	3	0	2	0	1 (Note: Appearance in Football League Trophy)	0	30	3
Darlington	1998–99	Third Division	12	2	0	0	2	1	0	0	14	3
Darlington	Total		44	5	4	0	4	1	1	0	53	6
Dundee United	1998–99	Scottish Premier League	25	0	6	0	0	0	0	0	31	0
Dundee United	1999–2000	Scottish Premier League	35	2	2	0	3	0	0	0	40	2
Dundee United	2000–01	Scottish Premier League	33	0	4	0	3	0	0	0	40	0
Dundee United	Total		93	2	12	0	6	0	0	0	111	2
Wigan Athletic	2001–02	Second Division	20	5	0	0	1	0	0	0	21	5
Wigan Athletic	2002–03	Second Division	43	8	1	0	5	0	0	0	49	8
Wigan Athletic	2003–04	First Division	27	2	1	0	0	0	0	0	28	2
Wigan Athletic	Total		90	15	2	0	6	0	0	0	98	15
Ipswich Town	2004–05	Championship	45	3	1	0	1	0	2 (Note: Appearances in Championship play-offs)	0	49	3
Ipswich Town	2005–06	Championship	41	3	1	0	0	0	0	0	42	3
Ipswich Town	2006–07	Championship	39	2	1	0	1	1	0	0	41	3
Ipswich Town	2007–08	Championship	46	2	0	0	1	0	0	0	47	2
Ipswich Town	Total		171	10	3	0	3	1	2	0	179	11
Career total			398	32	21	0	19	2	3	0	441	34

=== International ===
Appearances and goals by national team and year
National team	Year	Apps	Goals
Canada	1997	3	0
Canada	1998	1	0
Canada	1999	10	1
Canada	2000	14	2
Canada	2001	4	0
Canada	2002	6	0
Canada	2003	5	0
Canada	2004	6	1
Total		49	4

Scores and results list Canada's goal tally first, score column indicates score after each de Vos goal.

List of international goals scored by Jason de Vos
No.	Date	Venue	Opponent	Score	Result	Competition
1	June 2, 1999	Commonwealth Stadium, Edmonton, Canada	Guatemala	2–0	2–0	1999 Canada Cup
2	February 27, 2000	Los Angeles Memorial Coliseum, Los Angeles, United States	Colombia	1–0	2–0	2000 CONCACAF Gold Cup final
3	June 4, 2000	Estadio Pedro Marrero, Havana, Cuba	Cuba	1–0	1–0	2002 FIFA World Cup qualification
4	September 4, 2004	Commonwealth Stadium, Edmonton, Canada	Honduras	1–0	1–1	2006 FIFA World Cup qualification

== Honours ==
=== Player ===
Wigan Athletic

- Football League Second Division: 2002–03

Canada

- CONCACAF Gold Cup: 2000; third place: 2002

Individual

- CONCACAF Gold Cup Best XI: 2000, 2002
- CONCACAF Gold Cup Fair Play Award: 2000
- Canadian Player of the Year: 2002
- Manchester Evening News/GMR Sports Personality of the Month: April 2003
- Wigan Athletic Player of the Year: 2002–03
- PFA Team of the Year: 2002–03 Second Division
- Ipswich Town Players' Player of the Year: 2005–06
- Canadian Soccer Hall of Fame: Inducted 2013
- Ipswich Town F.C. Hall of Fame: Inducted 2019
