= Santos Cabrera =

Salvadoran footballer (born 1976)

Personal information
- Full name: Santos Dagoberto Cabrera Lazo
- Date of birth: November 1, 1976 (age 50)
- Place of birth: Pasaquina, La Unión Department, El Salvador
- Position: Midfielder

Senior career*
Years	Team	Apps	(Gls)
1994	Pasaquina		
1995–1998	Municipal Limeño		
1999–2005	Luis Ángel Firpo		

International career
1994	El Salvador U-20		
1997–2004	El Salvador	25	(2)
- * Club domestic league appearances and goals

Santos Dagoberto Cabrera Luzo (born November 1, 1976) is a retired Salvadoran footballer who played mostly for Luis Ángel Firpo, and internationally for the El Salvador national team.

== Club career ==
Santos Cabrera only played for Pasaquina, Municipal Limeño and Luis Angel Firpo. Cabrera played with Pasaquina of the "Liga de Ascenso" (Promotion League) at El Salvador in 1994. Then, he returned to El Salvador and found himself playing with Municipal Limeño in 1996. Santos Cabrera debuted at the Salvadoran Premier League on February 22, 1996 in a game where Limeño won El Roble by 5–1. After 2 seasons at Municipal Limeño, Cabrera played for Firpo. Cabrera started playing as an alternate. Later on, he held as a starter in Firpo and therefore was called by Carlos Recinos to El Salvador. In 2000, after a tour with Firpo in New York, he received an invitation from MetroStars (now known as New York Red Bulls) to try out. He convinced the team but a groin injury left him out. That same incident left him out of the final against ADET. Before his retirement, he was claimed for Águila, Alianza and San Salvador but did not want to establish conversations with all due respect to Firpo. "While I had contract, I respected the institution where I played", he said. He played both with Firpo and El Salvador with number 8.

== International career ==
Dagoberto Santos Cabrera Lazo started his playing career when he was in the El Salvador U-20, which was coached by Raul Magaña. Cabrera played a pre-tournament World category in Honduras in 1994. Cabrera Lazo debuted with the El salvador national football team, with a goal, on March 6, 1997 at the Los Angeles Memorial Coliseum against Atlético Celaya. The games was tied 1–1.

== Retirement ==
In the Apertura 2004 with Firpo, Cabrera played with a fractured hand and damaged meniscus. After that year he underwent two surgeries. By 2005, Cabrera moved to the United States with his family. He has worked selling new cars. In 2006, he moved to Houston, Texas. His next step, according to Cabrera, will be to prepare himself as a coach because he dreams of returning to El Salvador.
