= Eddy Heurlié =

Martiniquais footballer (born 1977)

Personal information
- Full name: Eddy Heurlié
- Date of birth: 27 December 1977 (age 48)
- Place of birth: Le Lamentin, Martinique
- Height: 1.73 m (5 ft 8 in)
- Position: Goalkeeper

Senior career*
Years	Team	Apps	(Gls)
1997–2000	Aiglon du Lamentin		
2000–2003	Troyes AC	0	(0)
2003–2004	US Raon-l'Étape	20	(0)
2004–2006	Aiglon du Lamentin		
2006–2008	Samaritaine		
2008–2015	Bélimois		
2015–2016	Golden Lion		
2016–2019	Rivière-Pilote		

International career
2001–2010	Martinique	40	(0)
- * Club domestic league appearances and goals

Eddy Heurlié (born 27 December 1977) is a Martiniquais former footballer who played for as goalkeeper.

== International career ==
Heurlié represented Martinique at the CONCACAF Gold Cup in 2002 and 2003.
