= Silvio Pedro =

Cuban footballer

Personal information
- Full name: Silvio Javier Pedro Miñoso
- Date of birth: December 23, 1976 (age 49)
- Place of birth: Cuba
- Position: Defender

Senior career*
| Years | Team | Apps | (Gls) |
| 2000–2010 | Villa Clara | | |

International career^{‡}
| 2002–2008 | Cuba | 66 | (0) |
- * Club domestic league appearances and goals ‡ National team caps and goals as of 1 April 2018

Silvio Javier Pedro Miñoso (born 23 December 1976) is a Cuban retired footballer.

== Club career ==
He played his entire career at provincial team Villa Clara, forming an experienced defense line with players like Odelín Molina and Yénier Márquez.

== International career ==
Pedro made his international debut for Cuba in a January 2002 friendly match against Guatemala and has earned a total of 66 caps, scoring no goals. He represented his country in 9 FIFA World Cup qualification matches and played at 4 CONCACAF Gold Cup final tournaments.

His final international was a December 2008 Gold Cup qualifier match against Guadeloupe.
