= Ludovic Mirande =

Martiniquais footballer (born 1977)

Personal information
- Date of birth: 6 January 1977 (age 49)
- Position: Defender

Senior career*
Years	Team	Apps	(Gls)
2000–2005	Assaut de Saint-Pierre		
2005–2006	Rivière-Pilote		
2008–2008	Santana Sainte-Anne		
2008–2010	Rivière-Pilote		
2010–2011	Muret	19	(2)

International career
2001–2006	Martinique	19	(0)
- * Club domestic league appearances and goals

Ludovic Mirande (born 6 January 1977), is a Martiniquais former footballer.

== Career statistics ==
=== Club ===
Appearances and goals by club, season and competition
Club	Season	League			National Cup		League Cup		Other		Total	
Club	Season	Division	Apps	Goals	Apps	Goals	Apps	Goals	Apps	Goals	Apps	Goals
Muret	2010–2011	Occitanie Regional 1	19	2	0	0	–		0	0	19	2
Career total			19	2	0	0	0	0	0	0	19	2

=== International ===
Appearances and goals by national team and year
National team	Year	Apps	Goals
Martinique	2001	4	0
Martinique	2002	5	0
Martinique	2003	6	0
Martinique	2004	2	0
Martinique	2006	2	0
Total		19	0
