= David Dicanot =

Martiniquais footballer (born 1973)

Personal information
- Full name: David-Alexandre Dicanot
- Date of birth: 23 September 1973 (age 53)
- Position: Defender

Senior career*
Years	Team	Apps	(Gls)
	Olympique de Marseille	0	(0)
1994/1995	FC Istres		
1996-1997	FC Martigues	32	(0)
1997-1998	FC Lorient	39	(1)
1998/99-1999/00	FC Martigues		
2000/01-2001/02	Racing Club de France Football		
- Club Franciscain
- US Marinoise

International career
2002-2003	Martinique	12	(0)
- * Club domestic league appearances and goals

David-Alexandre Dicanot (born 23 September 1973) is a Martiniquais retired footballer.

== Career ==
After failing to make an appearance for Olympique de Marseille, one of the most successful French clubs, Dicanot played for French lower league clubs Istres, Martigues, Lorient, and Racing Club de France Football.

During 2001/02, Dicanot expressed desire to go abroad after experiencing unfulfilled promises while playing for Racing Club de France Football. Despite having contacts in Greece as well as England, he eventually went to Martinique, where he played for Club Franciscain and US Martinoise.
