= The Red Jumpsuit Apparatus discography =

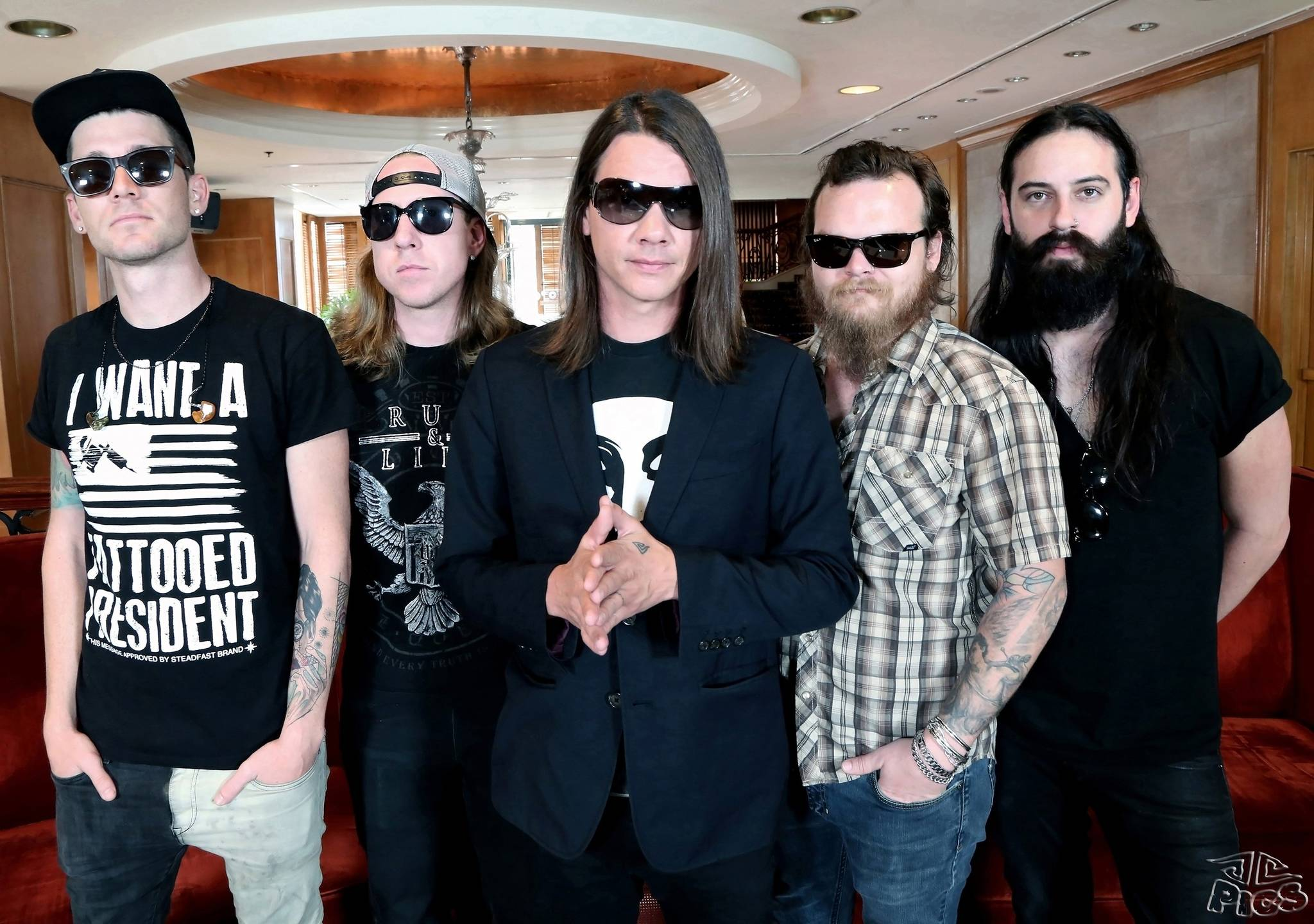
- Studio albums: 6
- EPs: 6
- Singles: 22
- Music videos: 18

The discography of American rock band The Red Jumpsuit Apparatus consists of six studio albums, two extended plays, twenty two singles and eighteen music videos.

== Albums ==
=== Studio albums ===
List of studio albums, with selected chart positions and certifications
Title	Album details	Peak chart positions							Certifications
Title	Album details	US	US Alt.	US Rock	AUS	CAN	JPN	NZ	Certifications
Don't You Fake It	Released: July 18, 2006 (US); Label: Virgin; Formats: CD, LP, digital download	25	—	8	—	—	81	23	RIAA: Platinum
Lonely Road	Released: February 3, 2009 (US); Label: Virgin; Formats: CD, digital download	14	3	5	41	35	52	—	
Am I the Enemy	Released: August 30, 2011 (US); Label: Collective, Universal; Formats: CD, digital download	61	7	7	—	—	161	—	
4	Released: July 4, 2014 (US); Formats: CD, digital download	—	—	—	—	—	—	—	
The Awakening	Released: March 30, 2018 (US); Formats: CD, digital download	—	—	—	—	—	—	—	
X's for Eyes	Released: October 3, 2025 (US); Label: Better Noise; Formats: CD, digital download	—	—	—	—	—	—	—	
"—" denotes a recording that did not chart or was not released in that territory.

=== Demo albums ===
List of demo albums
Title	Album details	Notes
The Red Jumpsuit Apparatus	Released: November 25, 2004; Label: Self-released; Formats: CD	Recorded and released by Vision Sound Studios in Orange Park, Florida; "Ass Shaker", "Cat and Mouse", "Justify", "Face Down" and "The Acoustic Song" later reappear in re-recorded versions on Don't You Fake It. The song "The Grimm Goodbye" and "Disconnected" appears as a hidden and bonus track, also re-recorded, while "Ass Shaker" and "The Acoustic Song" were renamed to "In Fate's Hands" and "Your Guardian Angel", respectively.

== Extended plays ==
List of extended plays, with selected chart positions
Title	Details	Peak chart positions
Title	Details	US
Demos	Released: 2006 (US); Label: Virgin; Formats: CD	—
AOL Sessions Undercover	Released: March 13, 2007 (US); Label: Virgin; Formats: CD, digital download	—
Shock Session	Released: March 20, 2009 (US); Label: Virgin; Formats: CD	—
The Hell or High Water EP	Released: August 24, 2010 (US); Formats: Digital download	189
Et Tu, Brute?	Released: March 15, 2013 (US); Formats: Digital download	—
The Emergency EP	Released: August 28, 2020 (US); Formats: Digital download	—
"—" denotes a recording that did not chart or was not released in that territory.

== Singles ==
List of singles, with selected chart positions, showing year released and album name
Title	Year	Peak chart positions									Certifications	Album
Title	Year	US	US Adult	US Alt.	US Christ. Rock	US Main. Rock	US Pop	CAN	CAN Rock	NZ	Certifications	Album
"Face Down"	2006	24	18	3	1	38	10	43	38	4	RIAA: 5× Platinum; BPI: Gold; RMNZ: 2× Platinum	Don't You Fake It
"False Pretense"	2007	—	—	39	—	—	—	—	—	—	RIAA: Gold	Don't You Fake It
"Your Guardian Angel"	2007	— (Note: "Your Guardian Angel" did not enter the Billboard Hot 100, but peaked at number 22 on the Bubbling Under Hot 100 Singles chart.)	—	—	—	—	—	—	—	19	RIAA: Platinum; RMNZ: Gold	Don't You Fake It
"Disconnected"	2007	—	—	—	—	—	—	—	—	—		Non-album single
"You Better Pray"	2008	—	—	17	—	31	—	—	—	—		Lonely Road
"Pen & Paper"	2009	75	—	32	—	—	—	—	—	—		Lonely Road
"Valentine"	2010	—	—	—	—	—	—	—	—	—		Non-album single
"Reap"	2011	—	—	—	—	39	—	—	—	—		Am I the Enemy
"Am I the Enemy"	2011	—	—	—	1	—	—	—	—	—		Am I the Enemy
"Angel in Disguise"	2011	—	—	—	—	—	—	—	—	—		Am I the Enemy
"Twilight"	2012	—	—	—	—	—	—	—	—	—		Non-album single
"Remember Me"	2013	—	—	—	1	—	—	—	—	—		Et Tu, Brute?
"Wide Is the Gate"	2013	—	—	—	1	—	—	—	—	—		Et Tu, Brute?
"The Right Direction"	2014	—	—	—	1	—	—	—	—	—		4
"California"	2014	—	—	—	2	—	—	—	—	—		4
"It Was You"	2015	—	—	—	1	—	—	—	—	—		4
"The Awakening"	2017	—	—	—	5	—	—	—	—	—		The Awakening
"On Becoming Willing"	2018	—	—	—	1	—	—	—	—	—		The Awakening
"Face Down (Symphonic Edition)"	2022	—	—	40	—	—	—	—	—	—		Non-album single
"Home Improvement"	2024	—	—	—	—	—	—	—	—	—		X's for Eyes
"Slipping Through (No Kings)"	2025	—	—	—	—	—	—	—	—	—		X's for Eyes
"Perfection"	2025	—	—	—	—	—	—	—	—	—		X's for Eyes
"Break Free" (with GORODA & Saliva)	2026	—	—	—	—	—	—	—	—	—		TBA
"—" denotes a recording that did not chart or was not released in that territory.

== Guest appearances ==
List of non-single guest appearances, showing year released and album name
Title	Year	Album
"Love Seat"	2009	Soundtrack 90210

== Music videos ==
List of music videos, showing year released and directors
Title	Year	Director(s)
"Face Down"	2006	Paul Minor
"Face Down" (live)	2006	—N/a
"False Pretense"	2006	Shane Drake
"Your Guardian Angel"	2007	Shane Drake
"You Better Pray"	2008	Tony Petrossian
"Pen & Paper"	2009	Chris Folkens
"Choke"	2011	Robby Starbuck
"Don't Hate"	2011	Robby Starbuck
"Hell or High Water"	2011	Robby Starbuck
"Am I the Enemy"	2012	Chris Folkens
"Remember Me"	2013	Ryan Sheehy
"The Right Direction"	2013	Ryan Sheehy
"Is This the Real World?"	2020	Joey Danger
"Face Down" (Symphonic)	2022	Angela Winter-Defoe
"Home Improvement"	2024	Angela Winter-Defoe
"Slipping Through (No Kings)"	2025	Steve Tramposch and Jamie Lewis
"Perfection"	2025	Shane Drake
"Angels Cry"	2026	
