= 4 (disambiguation) =

4 is a number, numeral, and digit.

4 or four may also refer to:

== Months and years ==
- AD 4, the fourth year of the AD era
- 4 BC, the fourth year before the AD era
- 1904
- 2004
- 2104
- The month of April

== Places ==
- Four, Isère, a French commune
- 4th arrondissement of Paris, an administrative district of Paris, France

== Transport ==
- 4 (New York City Subway service), service schedule
- BMW 4 Series, a series of luxury compact executive cars
- Renault 4, a subcompact family car
- Polestar 4, an electric SUV
- Buick Four, a series of luxury cars
- Oakland Four, a passenger car
- Line 4

== Film, television and radio ==
- 4 (2004 film), a Russian drama film directed by Ilya Khrzhanovsky
- 4 (2007 film), an Australian documentary film directed by Tim Slade
- Four (2011 film), a British film directed by John Langridge
- Four (2012 film), an American romantic drama film directed by Joshua Sanchez
- Four (TV series), an Indian soap opera
- RTL 4, a Dutch television channel
- Channel 4, a British television channel
- BBC Radio 4, a British radio station
- Four (New Zealand TV channel), a New Zealand television channel
- News 4 New York, a flagship newscast broadcast on WNBC-TV in New York City
- I Am Number Four, a novel, adapted into a 2011 film of the same name
- The Four: Battle For Stardom, a 2018 American music reality series

=== Fictional characters ===
- Four, the nickname of the fictional character Tobias Eaton in the Divergent series of books
- Four, a character from the fourth season of Battle for Dream Island, an animated web series
- Number Four (Battlestar Galactica), or Simon, a Cylon model in the re-imagined Battlestar Galactica series
- Numbuh 4, a fictional character in Codename: Kids Next Door

== Music ==
- #4, American musician a.k.a. James Root
- Four Four, an Australian independent record label

=== Albums ===
- 4 (Aitch album), 2025
- 4 (Beyoncé album), 2011
- 4 (Dungen album), 2008
- 4 (Foreigner album), 1981
- 4 (Fourplay album), 1998
- :4 (Galliano album), 1996
- 4 (Gerling album), 2006
- 4 (Johan album), 2009
- 4 (Kumbia Kings album), 2003
- 4 (Lead album), 2006
- 4 (Los Hermanos album), 2005
- 4 (Slash album), 2022
- 4 (Supersilent album), 1998
- 4 (The Telescopes album) 2022
- 4 (Whigfield album), 2002
- Four (Bleu album), 2010
- Four (Bloc Party album), 2012
- Four (Blues Traveler album), 1994
- Four (Fair Warning album), 2000
- Four! (Hampton Hawes album), 1958
- Four (Joe Henderson album), 1968
- Four (One Direction album), 2014
- Four (Seaweed album), 1993
- 4 (Matisse EP), 2003
- Four (Charlotte Church EP), 2014
- Four (Acts of Love), by Mick Harvey, 2013
- Fourth (album), by Soft Machine, 1971
- No. 4 (album), by Stone Temple Pilots, 1999
- #4 (album), by Ling tosite Sigure, 2005
- 4: John Paul George Ringo, a 2014 compilation EP featuring songs by John Lennon, Paul McCartney, George Harrison and Ringo Starr
- 4, a 1984 album by Lipps Inc.
- 4, a 2010 album by The Bamboos
- 4, a 2014 album by The Red Jumpsuit Apparatus, 2014
- 4, an EP by Hunter, 2004
- #4, an EP by Suburban Kids with Biblical Names, 2009
- 4 (Hitorie compilation), 2020

=== Songs ===
- "4", by Aphex Twin from Richard D. James Album, 1996
- "Four", by Lit from A Place in the Sun, 1999
- "Song 4", by Babymetal from Babymetal, 2014
- "Four" (composition), composition credited to Miles Davis which he first recorded in 1954

== Other uses ==
- 4, occasionally used in acronyms to mean the word "for"
- 4 (axiom), an axiom in modal logic
- Four (drink), a beverage
- Four, scoring ("boundary") situation in cricket
- FOUR score, a method of quantifying coma
- Fours (Enneagram of Personality), a psychological type of the Enneagram of Personality
- Four (comics), fictional characters in Planetary
- 4 Vesta, the second-largest asteroid after Ceres in the asteroid belt
- 4, the private key of a compromised eMudhra digital certificate

== Similar glyphs ==
- , symbol for Jupiter
- Ч, Che (Cyrillic), a letter of the Cyrillic alphabet
- Ɥ, an IPA symbol for the labialized palatal approximant
- Կ and its lower case, Վ, letters of the Armenian alphabet

== See also ==
- IV (disambiguation)
- 04 (disambiguation)
- Coxed four and coxless four, types of competitive rowing boat
- Dufour/Defour/Du Four/De Four (disambiguation)
- Fourth (disambiguation)
- Fantastic Four
- Gang of Four (disambiguation)
- Number Four (disambiguation)
- Plus four (disambiguation)
- The Four (disambiguation)
- Type 4 (disambiguation)
- Year Four
