= IV =

IV may refer to:

== Businesses and organizations ==
=== In the United States ===
- Immigration Voice, an activist organization
- Intellectual Ventures, a privately held intellectual property company
- InterVarsity Christian Fellowship

=== Elsewhere ===
- Federation of Austrian Industries (German: Industrievereinigung)
- Irish Volunteers, a military organization
- Italia Viva, an Italian centrist political party

== Music ==
- Subdominant, in music theory

=== Recordings ===
- IV (The Aggrolites album), 2009
- IV (Angband album), 2020
- IV (BadBadNotGood album), 2016
- IV (Black Mountain album), 2016
- IV (Cypress Hill album), 1998
- IV (Diamond Rio album), 1996
- IV (Goatsnake album), 1998
- IV (Godsmack album), 2006
- IV (Hiroyuki Sawano album), 2021
- I.V. (Loma Prieta album), 2012
- IV (Marvelous 3 album), 2023
- IV (Maylene and the Sons of Disaster album), 2011
- IV (Ton Steine Scherben album), 1981
- IV (The Stranglers album), 1980
- IV (To/Die/For album), 2004
- IV (Veruca Salt album), 2006
- IV (Winger album), 2006
- IV (Željko Joksimović album), 2005
- Faust IV, 1973
- Good Apollo, I'm Burning Star IV, Volume One: From Fear Through the Eyes of Madness, by Coheed and Cambria, 2005
- Led Zeppelin IV, 1971
- Toto IV, 1982
- IV (The 1975 EP), 2013
- IV (Lifer EP), 2002
- "I.V." (song), by X Japan, 2008
- IV, 1998 album by Siam Shade
- IV, a 1990 EP by The Lookouts

== Places ==
- Ivory Coast, a country in West Africa
- IV postcode area, north Scotland
- Isla Vista, California, United States

== In science, technology and mathematics ==
- Intravenous therapy, a route of administration of a drug
- I–V curve, current–voltage curve characteristic
- Implied volatility, a term in financial mathematics
- Independent variable, in mathematical and statistical modeling
- Independent verification systems, in voting machines
- Induction variable, in computer science
- Initialization vector, in cryptography
- Instrumental variable, in statistics
- Intrinsic viscosity
- Iodine value, in chemistry
- Trochlear nerve, the fourth cranial nerve

== Other uses ==
- 4 (number) in Roman numerals
- Four-Phase Systems, a computer company whose logo was a stylized "IV"
- International Viewpoint, an online magazine of the Trotskyist reunified Fourth International
- Inter vivos trust, a legal instrument
- Coleman Williams, American country music singer known professionally as IV

== See also ==
- 4 (disambiguation)
