= Pen and Paper =

Pen and Paper may refer to:

- "Pen and Paper" (Jerry Lee Lewis song), 1963
- "Pen & Paper", a 2009 song by The Red Jumpsuit Apparatus
- Pen and Paper, a 1965 album by Faron Young

== See also ==
- Paper-and-pencil game
- Pen-and-paper role-playing game
