= List of public transport routes numbered 4 =

In public transport, Route 4 may refer to:

- Route 4 (MTA Maryland), a bus route in the suburbs of Baltimore, United States
- Barcelona Metro line 4 in Barcelona, Spain
- NWFB Route 4, a bus route in Hong Kong
- London Buses route 4 in London, United Kingdom
- Line 4 (Madrid Metro) in Madrid, Spain
- Line 4 Yellow (Montreal Metro) in Montreal, Canada
- 4 (New York City Subway service), a subway line in New York City, United States
- Shanghai Metro Line 4 in Shanghai, China

== See also ==
- Line 4 (disambiguation)
