= Your Guardian Angel =

2007 single by the Red Jumpsuit Apparatus

Single by The Red Jumpsuit Apparatus

from the album Don't You Fake It
- Released: August 7, 2007
- Genre: Emo
- Length: 3:51
- Label: Virgin
- Songwriter: Ronnie Winter
- Producer: David Bendeth

The Red Jumpsuit Apparatus singles chronology
"False Pretense" (2007)	"Your Guardian Angel" (2007)	"You Better Pray" (2008)

"Your Guardian Angel" is a song by the band the Red Jumpsuit Apparatus. There are two different versions - a mostly acoustic version found on their first major-label album, Don't You Fake It, and a completely acoustic version (titled "The Acoustic Song") on their demo album. "Your Guardian Angel" was released to radio on August 7, 2007. It is the third single released by the band, with the video released on October 15, 2007. It was featured in the season finale of the CBS show Moonlight titled "Mortal Cure". According to Ronnie Winter, the song is dedicated to the eight students that lost their lives in the March 1, 2007 tornado that destroyed a high school in Enterprise, Alabama. The song was the school's prom theme that year.

The song explores themes such as altruism and love.

The album version at the end, which leads into the hidden track; "The Grimm Goodbye".

Winter stated that the song was originally planned to be the album's lead single, but the label thought it would be "too risky" to use a ballad as the album's first single. "Face Down" was chosen as the lead single instead.

== Music video ==
The music video for "Your Guardian Angel" shows Ronnie Winter turning on many lightbulbs, and singing the song in a closet with one light bulb, then he plays and sings while the band is preparing for a concert. They perform in front of the crowd of fans with flashy light effects during the distortion part. Winter turns off the lightbulb at the end of the song. The video was directed by Shane Drake who has done work for other bands such as Panic! at the Disco and Paramore.

== Credits ==
This song was written and composed by Ronnie Winter.

== Charts ==
Chart (2007–08)	Peak position
New Zealand (Recorded Music NZ)	19
US Bubbling Under Hot 100 (Billboard)	22

== Certifications ==
Region	Certification	Certified units/sales
New Zealand (RMNZ)	Gold	15,000^{‡}
United States (RIAA)	Platinum	1,000,000^{‡}
^{‡} Sales+streaming figures based on certification alone.
