= Exchange Square (Hong Kong) =

Office complex in Central, Hong Kong

- 交易廣場
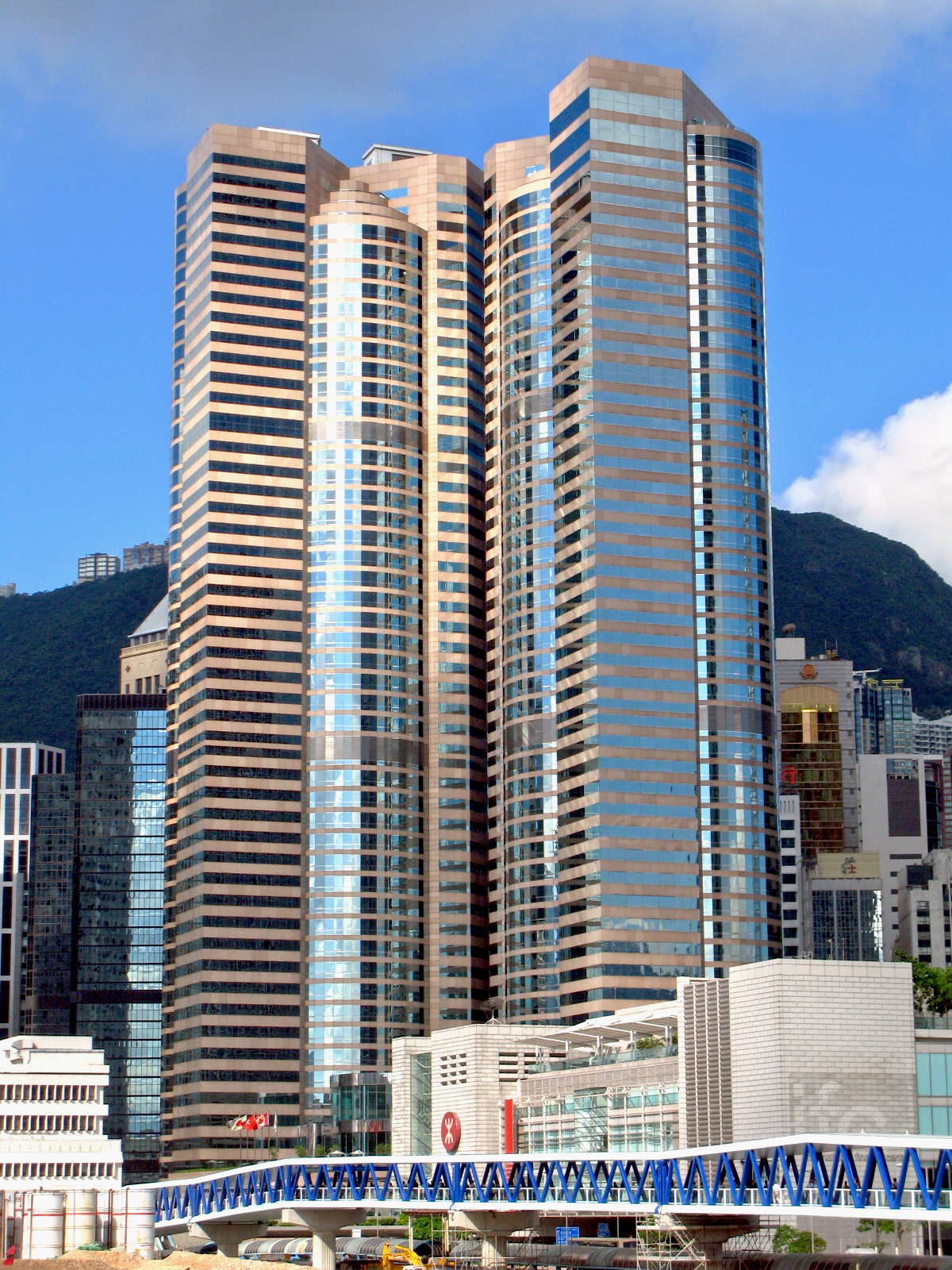
- One and Two Exchange Square
- Interactive map of the Exchange Square area

General information
- Status: Completed
- Type: Office
- Location: 8 Connaught Place, Central, Hong Kong
- Coordinates: 22°17′2″N 114°9′30″E
- Construction started: 1983; 43 years ago
- Completed: 1988; 38 years ago
- Opening: Phases 1 & 2: 1985; 41 years ago; Phase 3: 1988; 38 years ago
- Cost: Whole project: US$256,410,257
- Owner: Hongkong Land

Height
- Roof: 188 m (617 ft)

Technical details
- Floor count: Tower 1: 52; Tower 2: 51; Tower 3: 33
- Floor area: Total: 130,680 m^{2} (1,406,628 sq ft)
- Lifts/elevators: Towers 1 & 2: 22 + 2; Tower 3: 12

Design and construction
- Architect: Palmer & Turner
- Developer: Hong Kong Land
- Main contractor: Gammon Construction

Exchange Square (Chinese: 交易廣場; Jyutping: gaau1 jik6 gwong2 coeng4) is a building complex located in Central, Hong Kong. It houses offices and the Hong Kong Stock Exchange. It is served by the Central and Hong Kong stations of the MTR metro system.

Most of the Exchange Square is owned by Hong Kong Land, with the remaining portion owned by the Government. The building has three blocks, namely, One Exchange Square, Two Exchange Square and Three Exchange Square. A shopping block known as The Forum was redeveloped as an office building in 2011–14.

The ground level houses a large bus terminus, Central (Exchange Square) Bus Terminus.

== Tenants ==
The property is the home of the Stock Exchange of Hong Kong since the 1980s. It also houses many international banking and law firms including Bank of Montreal, Commonwealth Bank of Australia, Lloyd George Management, DLA Piper, Ropes & Gray, RPC, Latham & Watkins and Allen & Overy. Other major tenants include Sixth Street Partners, Aberdeen Standard Investment, Angelo Gordon, Bluepool Capital, China Merchants Securities, CSOP, CQS, Evercore, Fanda Partners, Harvest Fund, Hillhouse Capital, Hopu Investment and Janchor Partners. Exchange Square is also home to the Hong Kong International Arbitration Centre, the American Club of Hong Kong, and the consulates in Hong Kong of Argentina, Canada, and Japan.

== Plot ==
Hong Kong Land tendered the government HK$4.76 billion for the plot in February 1982, when the market was at a record high. Prices subsequently dropped, necessitating its debt to be restructured. In February 1983, HKL obtained an eight-year loan of HK$4 billion, a record. In December 1983, it announced that the plot was to be mortgaged to secure a HK$2.5 billion loan facility. The second instalment of HK$2 billion on the plot was due in the financial year 1984/85.

== Phase three ==
Development cost HK$750m, 32-storey 322,000-square-foot (29,900 m^{2}) office tower, 32,000-square-foot (3,000 m^{2}) mall, substructure contractor Gammon Hong Kong.

== The Forum ==
The Forum (Chinese: 富臨閣) was a shopping complex at the podium level. From 2011 to 2014, it was redeveloped into a seven-storey office building with a floor area of 4,460 sq m. It is wholly occupied by Standard Chartered Bank. The plaza outside the forum includes a landscaped roof garden, stepped terraces and fountains, and a collection of sculptures by artists such as Henry Moore, Ju Ming and Dame Elizabeth Frank.

== Gallery ==
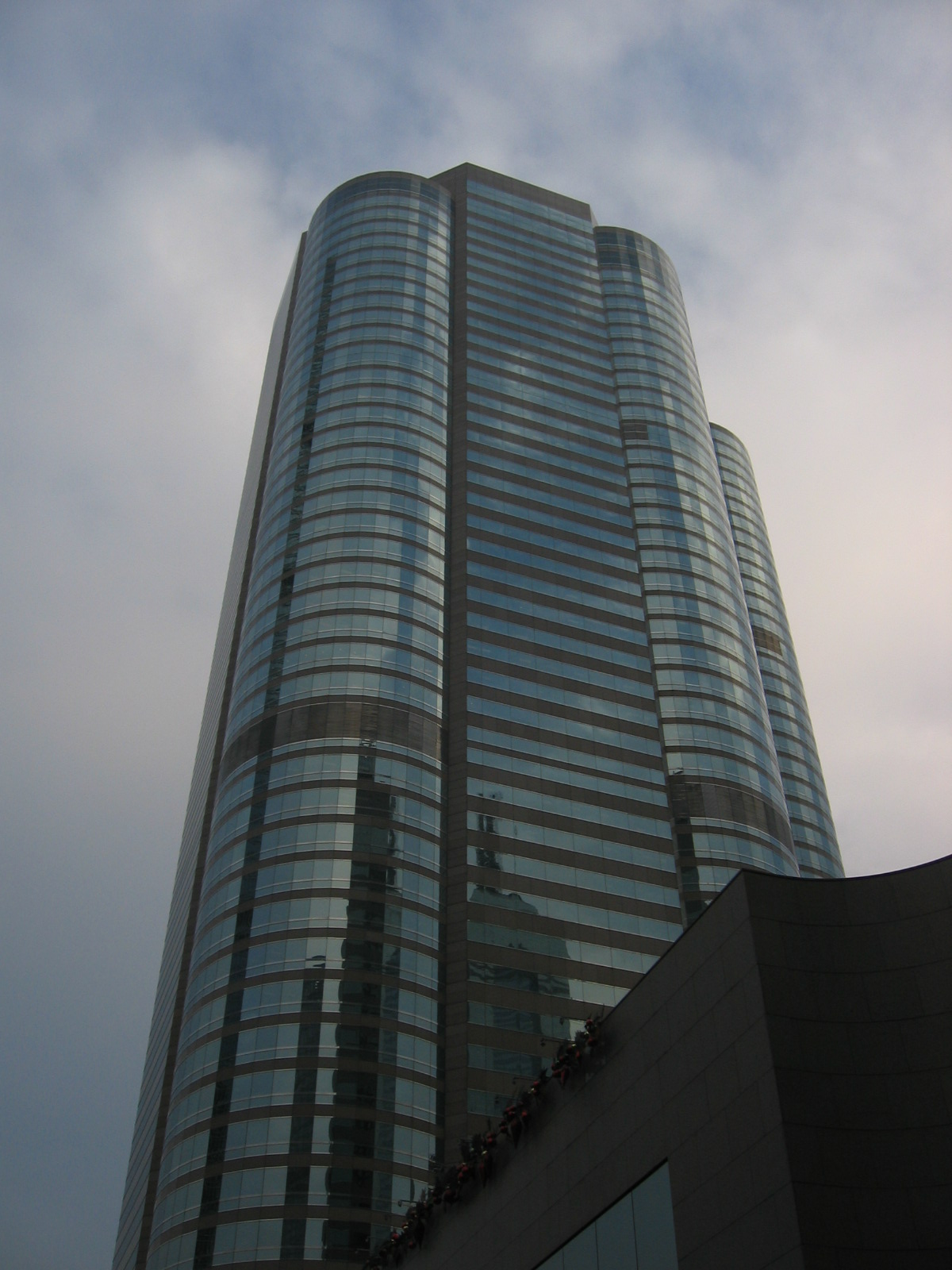
Towers of One Exchange Square (back) and Two Exchange Square (front)

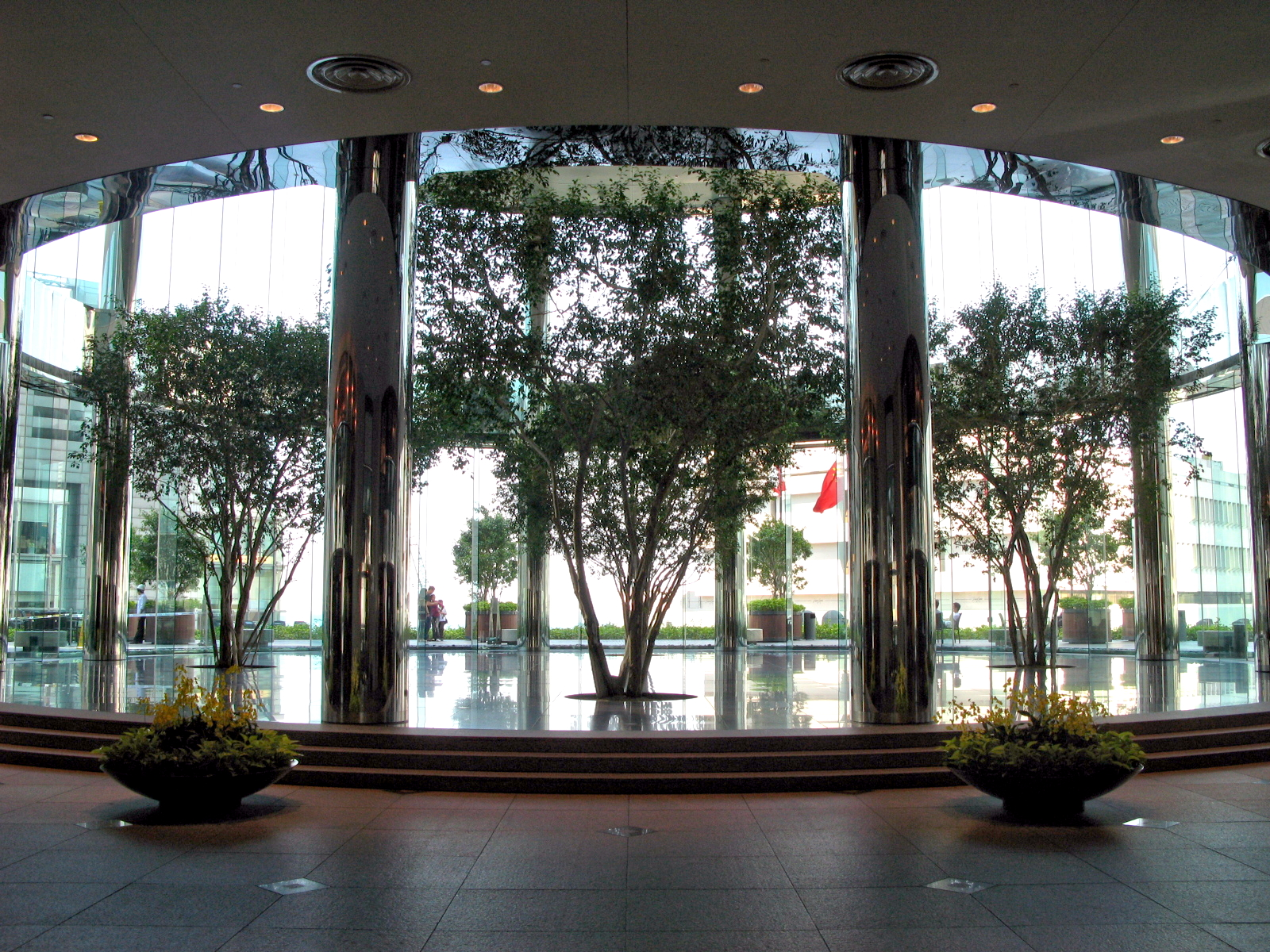
One Exchange Square lobby

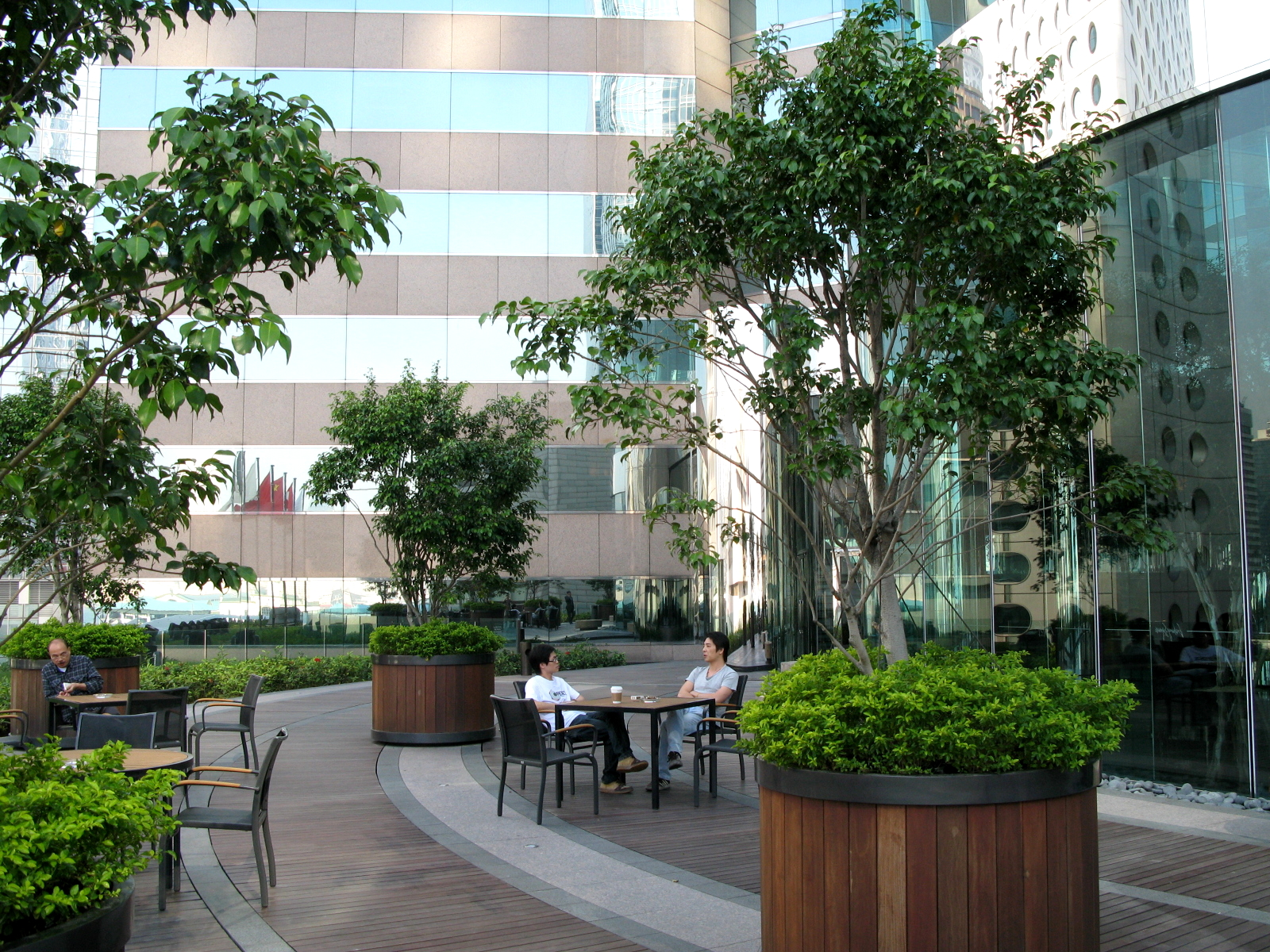
One Exchange Square garden

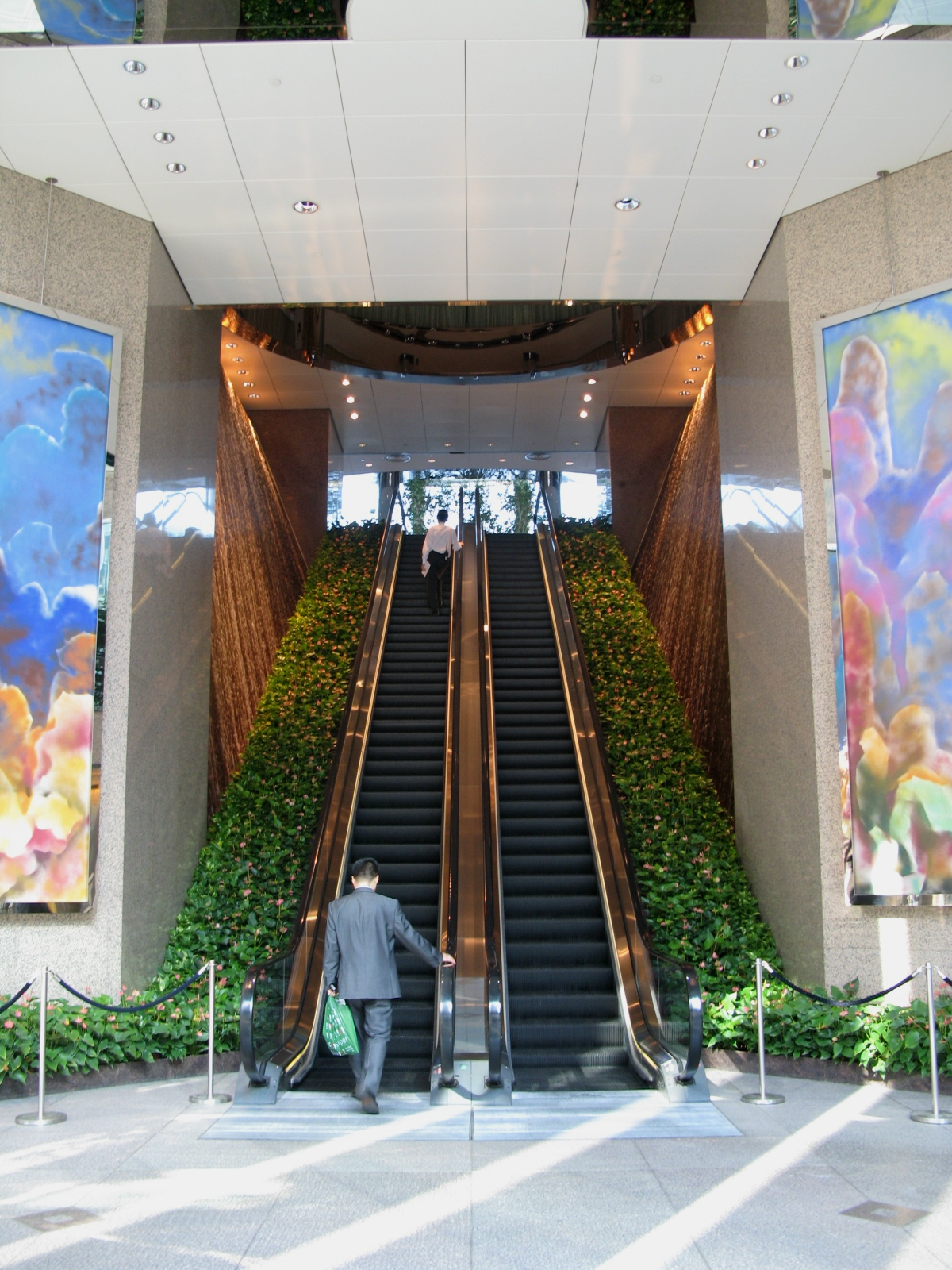
One Exchange Square entrance. The colour mural on the left and right sides is Landscape by Sidney Nolan.

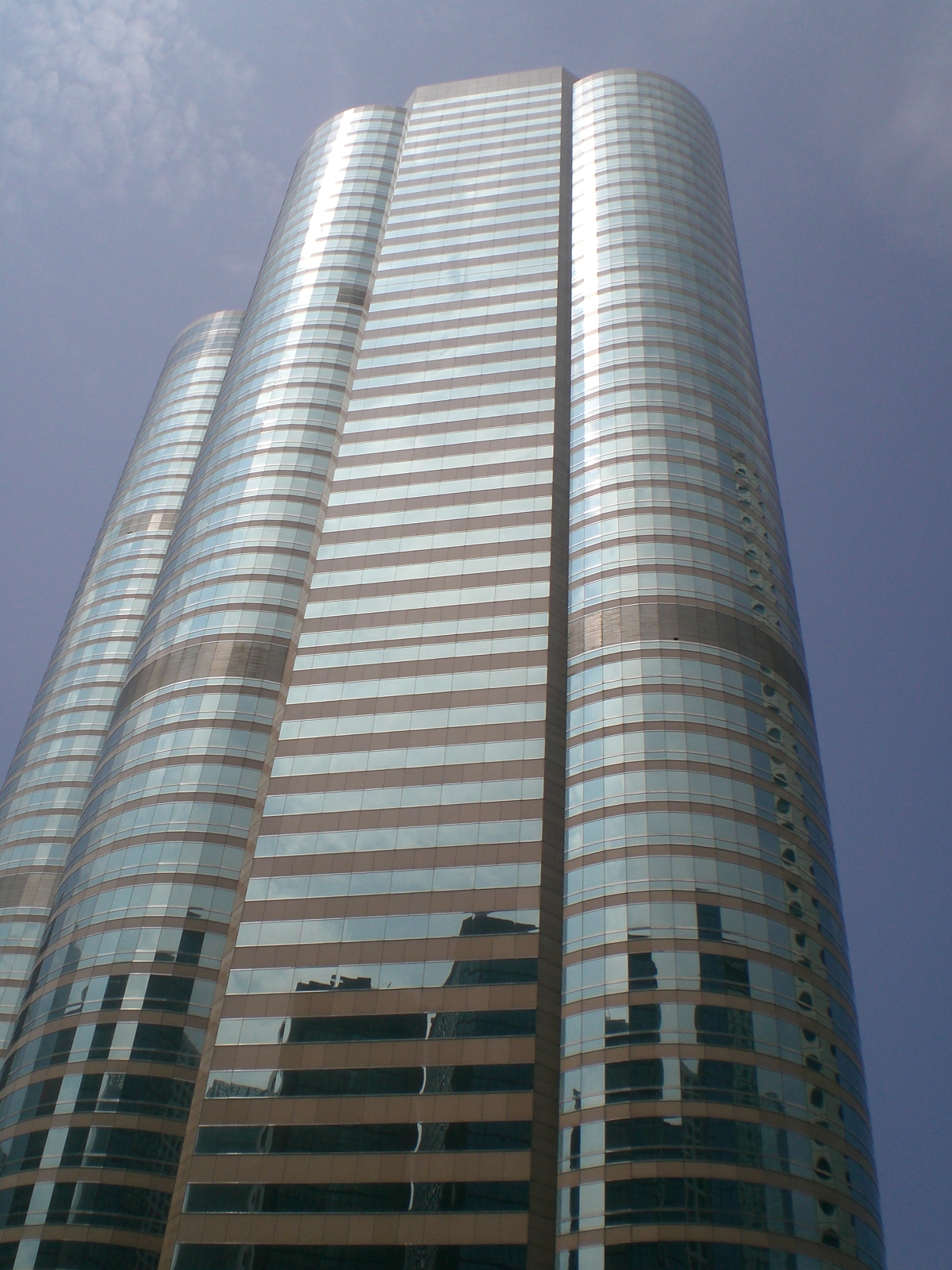
Two Exchange Square

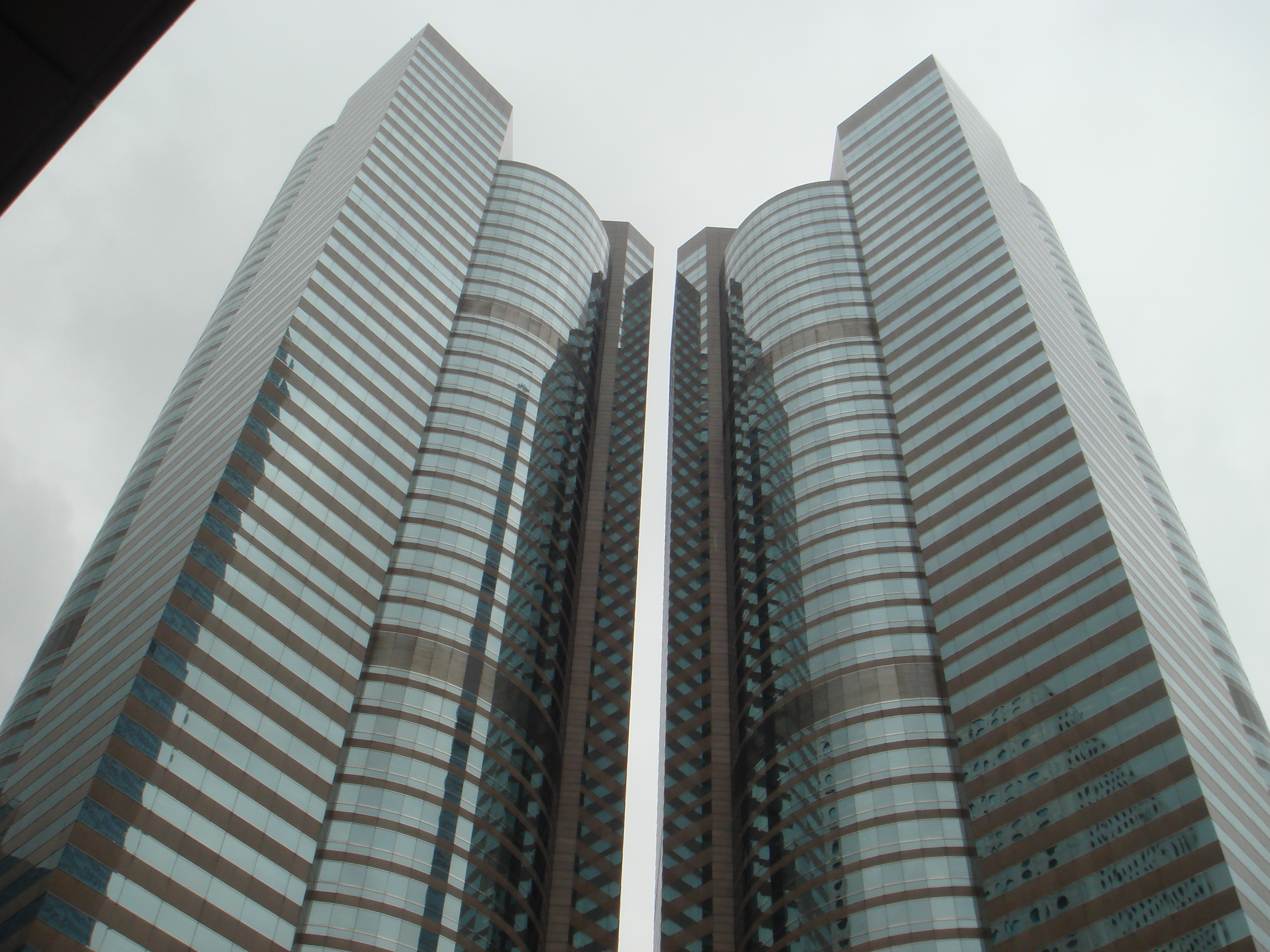
One and Two Exchange Square

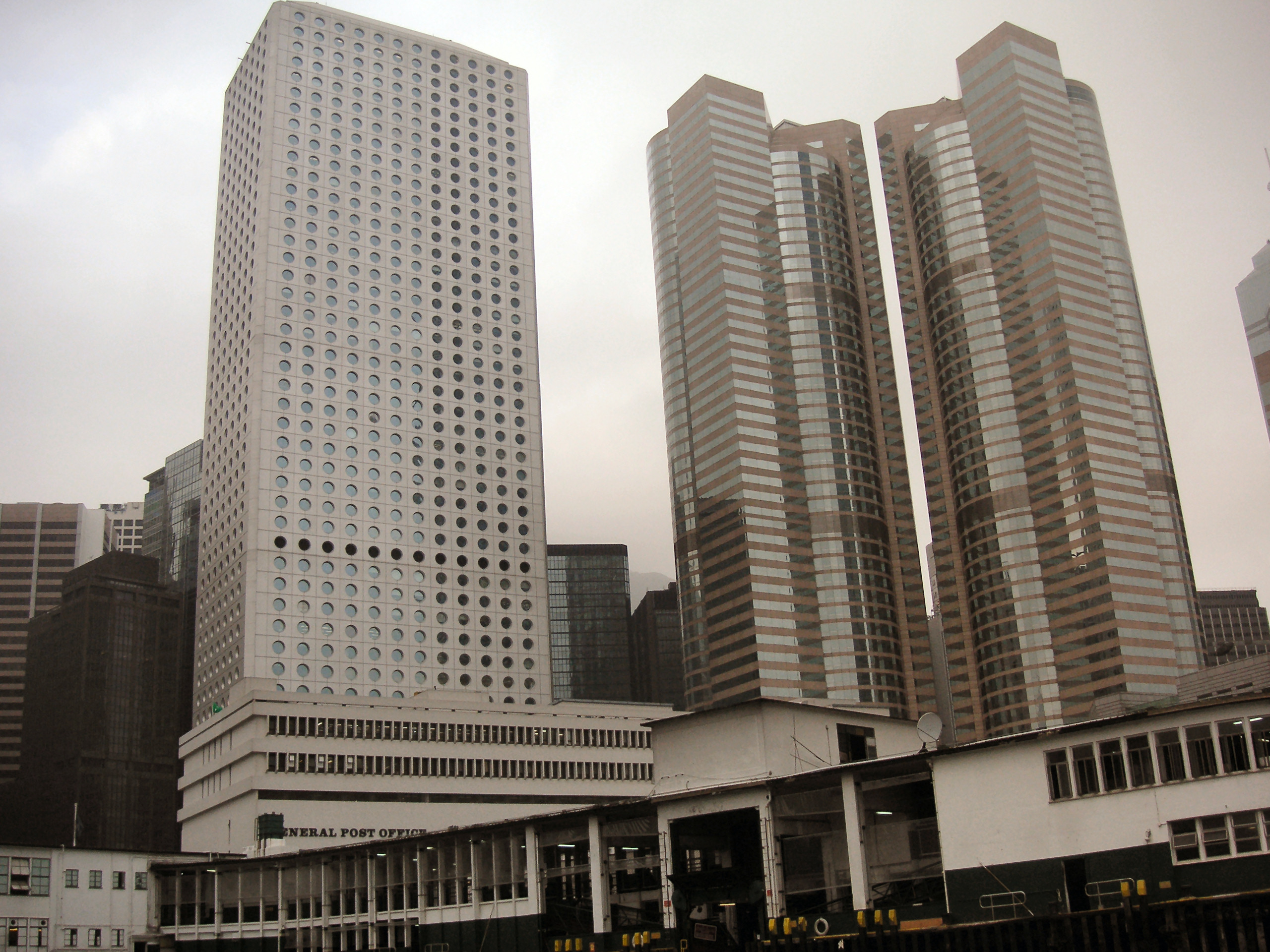
Jardine House and Towers of One Exchange Square and Two Exchange Square

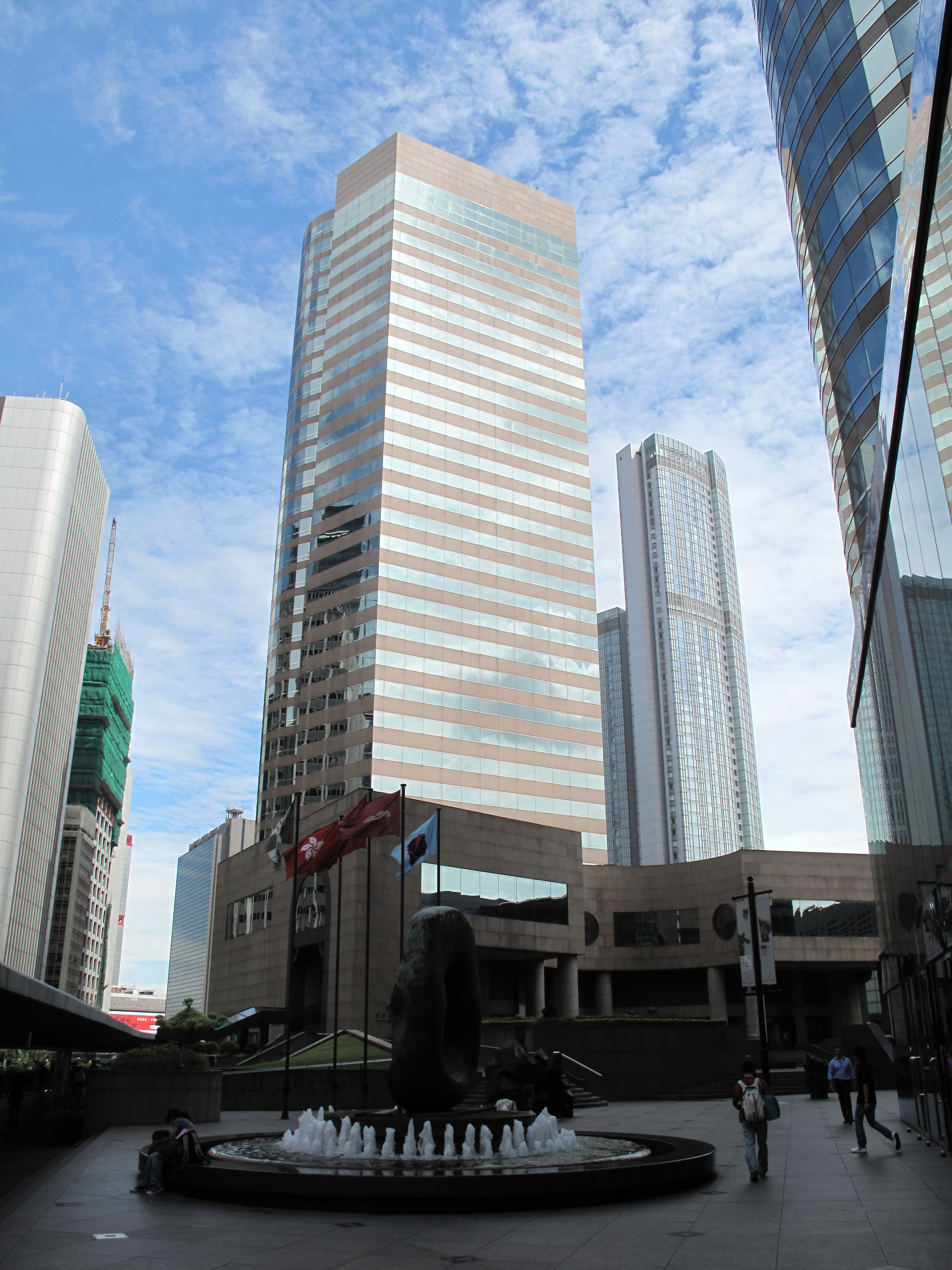
Three Exchange Square

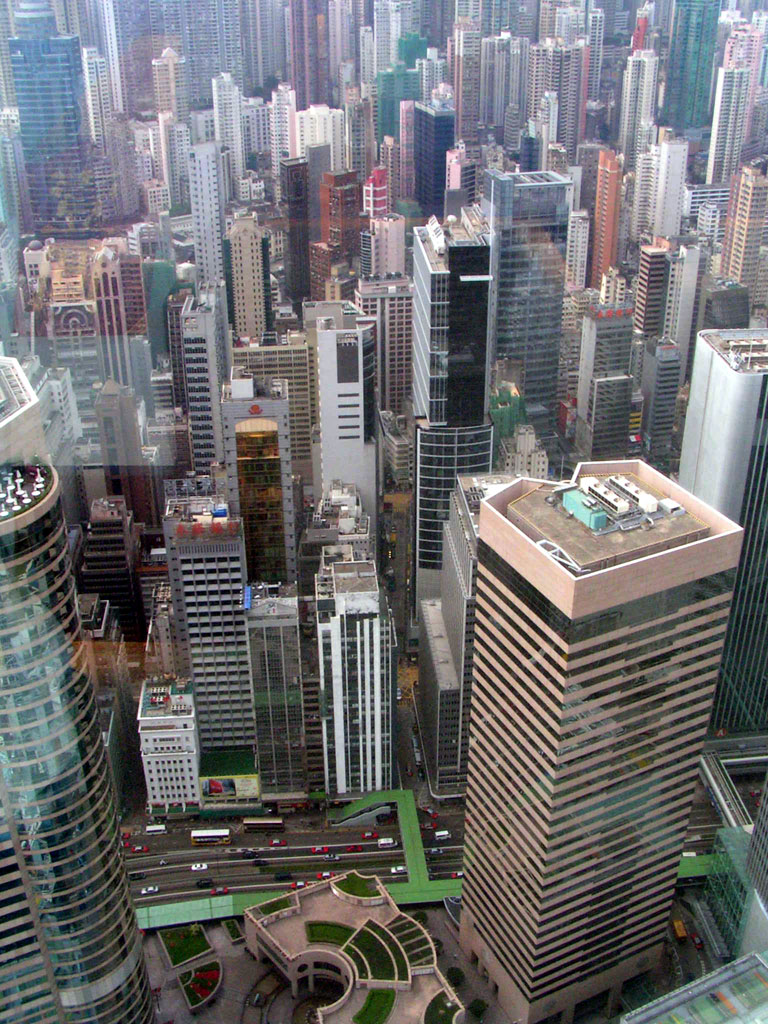
Three Exchange Square seen from 2IFC

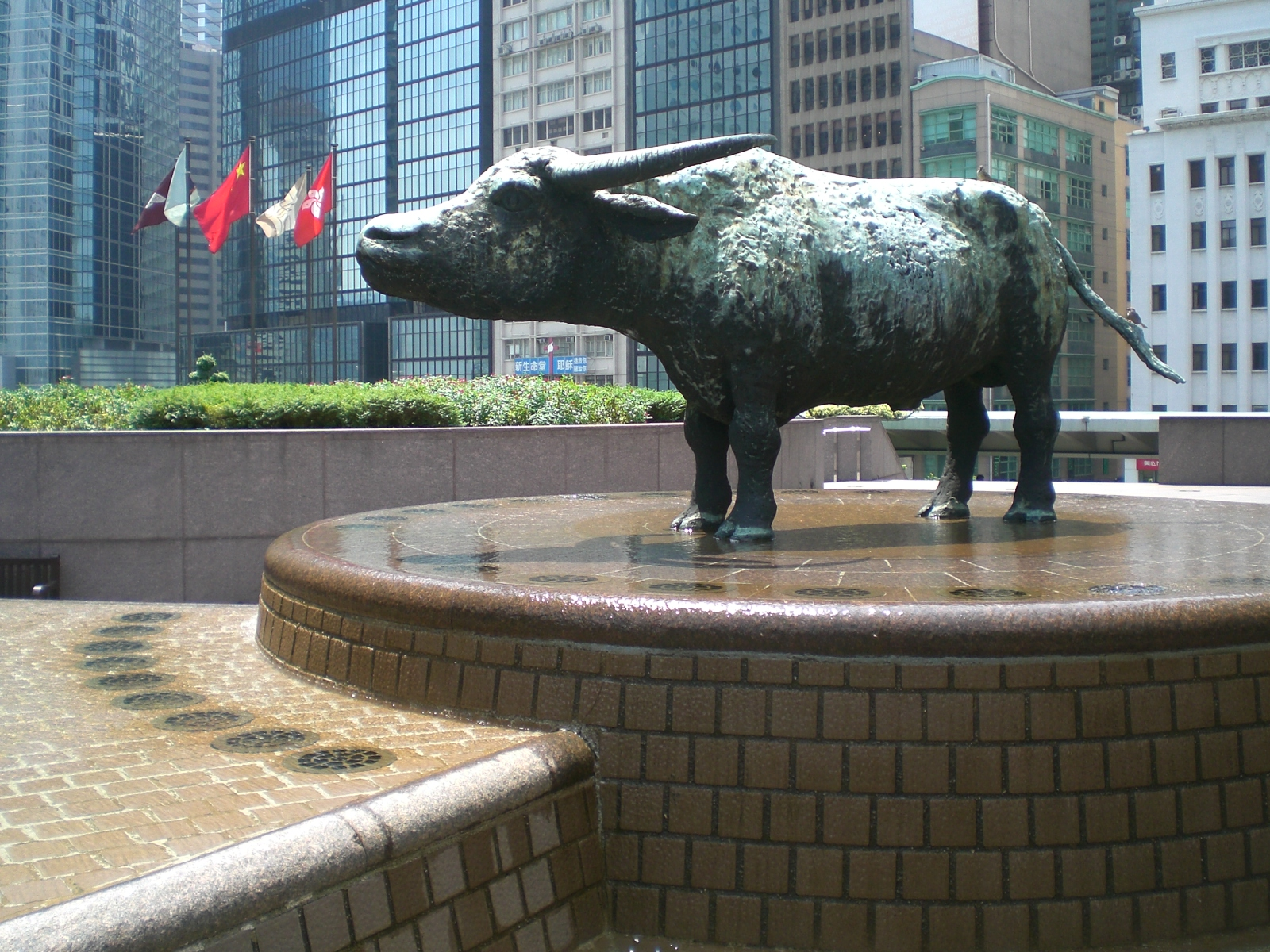
A water buffalo by English sculptor Elisabeth Frink stands in Exchange Square

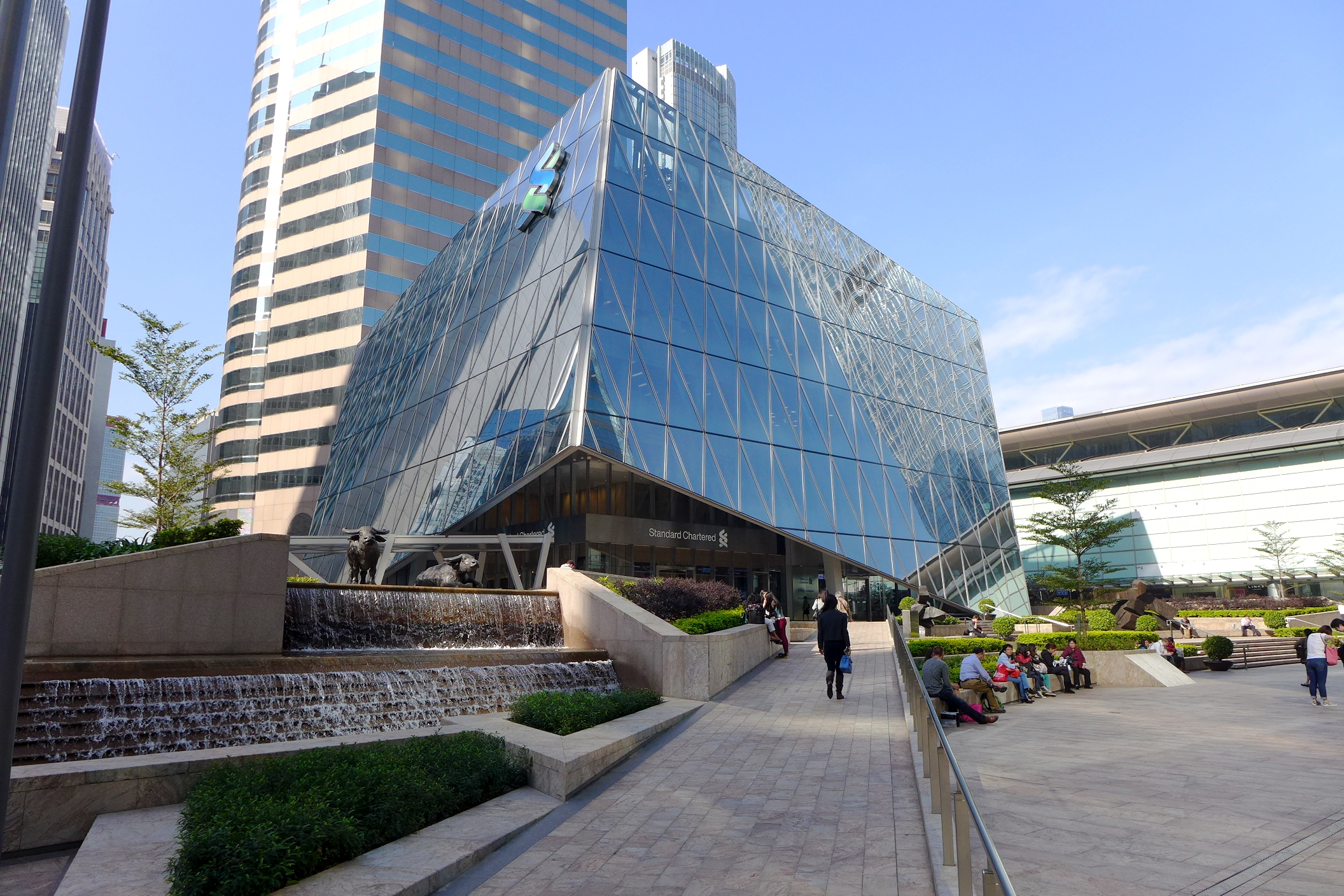
The Forum at Exchange Square by architect Aedas

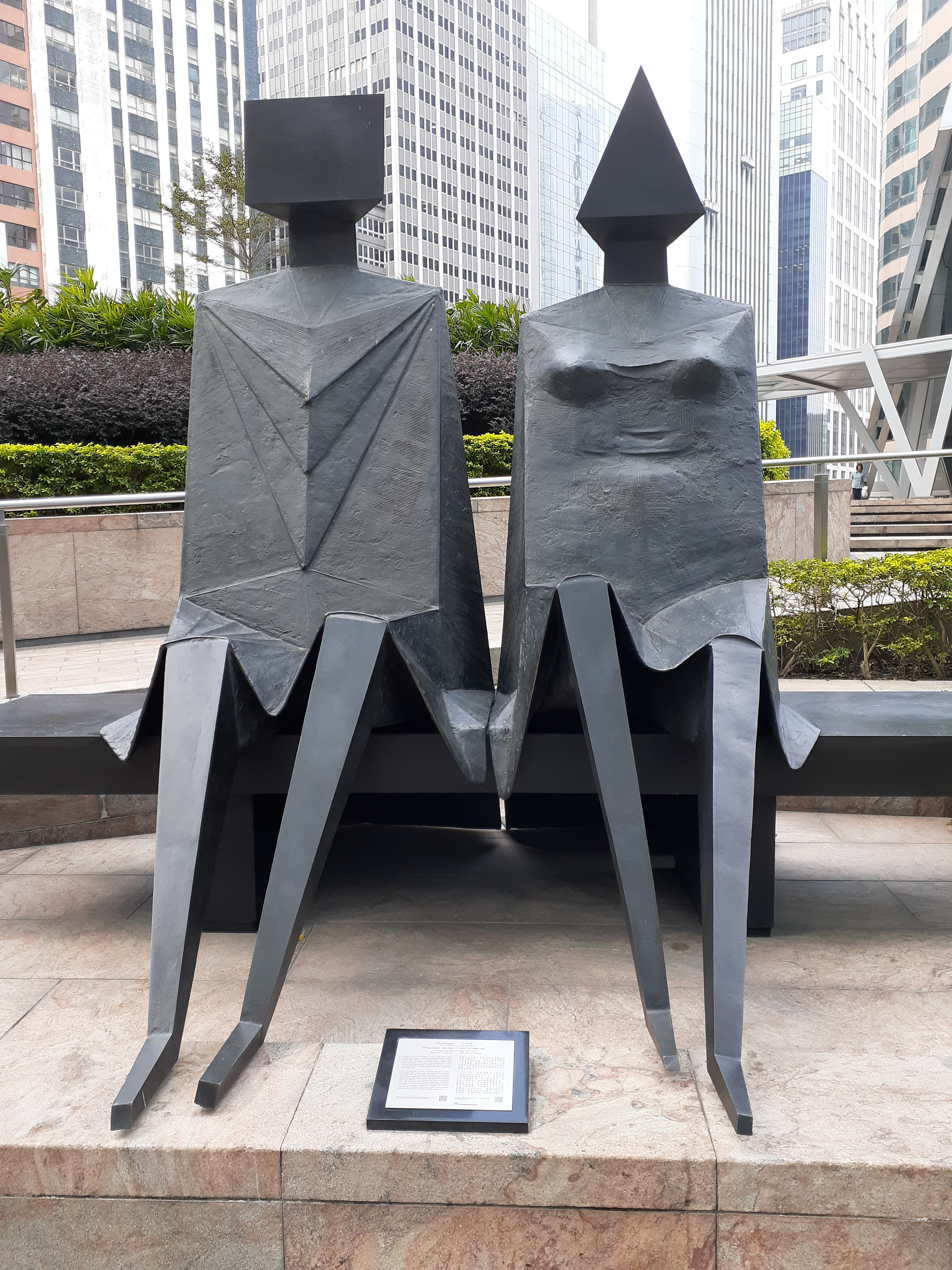
Sitting Couple by Lynn Chadwick, Exchange Square, Hong Kong, China

== Nearby buildings ==
- Jardine House
- Chater House (formerly King's Building)
- Mandarin Oriental (formerly Queen's Building)
- Alexandra House
- Prince's Building
- The Landmark
- Cheung Kong Center
- HSBC Building
- Standard Chartered Hong Kong
- Three Garden Road
- World-Wide House
- Wheelock House
- Hang Seng Bank Headquarters Building

== See also ==
- List of buildings and structures in Hong Kong
- List of tallest buildings in Hong Kong
