= Pen & Paper =

Single by The Red Jumpsuit Apparatus

from the album Lonely Road
- Released: January 2009 (digital); February 27, 2009
- Recorded: 2008
- Genre: Alternative rock, pop punk
- Length: 3:24
- Label: Virgin
- Songwriter(s): Ronnie Winter, Elias Reidy

The Red Jumpsuit Apparatus singles chronology
"You Better Pray" (2008)	"Pen & Paper" (2009)	"Represent" (2009)

"Pen & Paper", otherwise known as "Pen & Paper (Something Typical)", is the second single released from the Red Jumpsuit Apparatus' second album, Lonely Road. The song charted at No. 75 on the Billboard Hot 100, and No. 32 on the Billboard Alternative Songs chart. In the music video of the song, Ronnie Winter describes the song as "taking someone in your life that's fake and removing them".
