= Line 4 =

Line 4 or 4 Line may refer to:

== Public transport ==
=== Asia ===
- Line 4 (Chennai Metro), or Orange Line, under construction in India
- Line 4 (Riyadh Metro), in Saudi Arabia
- Yellow Line (Kolkata Metro), in India
- Busan Metro Line 4, a rubber-tyred metro line in Busan, South Korea
- Manila Light Rail Transit System Line 4, Metro Manila, Philippines
- MRT Line 4 (Dhaka Metro Rail), in Bangladesh
- Line 4 (Mumbai Metro), under early stages of construction
- Chūō Line (Osaka) or Chūō Line, in Japan
- Seoul Subway Line 4, a line across the National Capital Area, South Korea
- Sri Petaling Line, the fourth rapid transit line in Klang Valley, Malaysia
- Zhonghe–Xinlu line, a metro line in Taipei, Taiwan

==== China ====
- Line 4 (Beijing Subway), a subway line in Beijing
- Line 4 (Changchun Rail Transit), a metro line in Changchun, Jilin
- Line 4 (Changsha Metro), a metro line in Changsha, Hunan
- Line 4 (Chengdu Metro), a metro line in Chengdu, Sichuan
- Line 4 (Chongqing Rail Transit), a metro line in Chongqing
- Line 4 (Dongguan Rail Transit), a planned metro line in Dongguan, Guangdong
- Line 4 (Fuzhou Metro), a line under construction in Fuzhou, Fujian
- Line 4 (Guangzhou Metro), a metro line in Guangzhou, Guangdong
- Line 4 (Hangzhou Metro), a metro line in Hangzhou, Zhejiang
- Line 4 (Hefei Metro), a metro line in Hefei, Anhui
- Line 4 (Jinan Metro), a metro line in Jinan, Shandong
- Line 4 (Kunming Metro), a metro line in Kunming, Yunnan
- Line 4 (Nanchang Metro), a metro line in Nanchang, Jiangxi
- Line 4 (Nanjing Metro), a metro line in Nanjing, Jiangsu
- Line 4 (Nanning Metro), a metro line in Nanning, Guangxi
- Line 4 (Ningbo Rail Transit), a metro line in Ningbo, Zhejiang
- Line 4 (Qingdao Metro), a metro line in Qingdao, Shandong
- Line 4 (Shanghai Metro), a metro line in Shanghai
- Line 4 (Shenzhen Metro), a metro line in Shenzhen, Guangdong
- Line 4 (Suzhou Metro), a metro line in Suzhou, Jiangsu
- Line 4 (Tianjin Metro), a metro line in Tianjin
- Line 4 (Wuhan Metro), a metro line in Wuhan, Hubei
- Line 4 (Wuxi Metro), a metro line in Wuxi, Jiangsu
- Line 4 (Xi'an Metro), a metro line in Xi'an, Shaanxi
- Line 4 (Xiamen Metro), a metro line in Xiamen, Fujian
- Line 4 (Zhengzhou Metro), a metro line in Zhengzhou, Henan

=== Europe ===
- Line 4 (Athens Metro), an under construction metro line in Greece
- Barcelona Metro line 4, a line in Spain
- Rodalies Barcelona line 4, a commuter railway in Spain
- Line 4 (Bilbao Metro), a proposed line
- Line 4 (Bucharest Metro), a line in Romania
- Line 4 (Budapest Metro), a line in Hungary
- Line 4 (Madrid Metro), a line in Spain
- Line 4 (Milan metro), an underground rapid transit line under construction in Italy
- Line 4 (Moscow Metro), a metro line in Moscow, Russia
- Paris Metro Line 4, a line in France
- Paris Tramway Line 4, a tram-train line just outside the limits of Paris proper
- Line 4 (Saint Petersburg Metro), a metro line in Saint Petersburg, Russia
- U4 (Vienna U-Bahn), a line in Austria

=== Oceania ===
- Eastern Suburbs and Illawarra Line, coded T4, coloured navy, a train line in Sydney, New South Wales.

=== North America ===
- Line 4 Sheppard, a subway line in Toronto, Canada
- Yellow Line (Montreal Metro), formerly known as Line 4, in Canada
- Line 4 of the Guadalajara urban rail system, Mexico
- Mexico City Metro Line 4, a rapid transit line in Mexico City
- Mexico City Metrobús Line 4, a bus rapid transit line in Mexico City
- Route 4 (Baltimore), a bus route in the United States
- No. 4 Line (Baltimore streetcar), replaced by MTA Maryland Route 15
- 4 (New York City Subway service), a subway line in New York City
- 4 (Los Angeles Railway), streetcar lines in Los Angeles
- 4 Line (Sound Transit), a planned light rail line in Washington State
- Line 4 (O-Train), the Airport Link (Blue Line) of Ottawa's O-Train

=== South America ===
- Line 4 (Rio de Janeiro), a line under construction in Brazil
- Line 4 (São Paulo Metro), a line under construction in Brazil
- Santiago Metro Line 4, in Chile
- Santiago Metro Line 4A, in Chile

== Measurement ==
- 4-line, obsolete measure in Line
- 4-line, 12.17x44mm ammunition or a rifle which fires it

== See also ==
- 4 Train (disambiguation)
- List of public transport routes numbered 4
