= The Four =

The Four may refer to:

- Glasgow Four, the four prominent leaders of the Glasgow School
- Four (comics), a group of comic book supervillains from the series Planetary
- The Four (Forgotten Realms), adventurers from the Forgotten Realms fantasy setting
- The Four: Battle for Stardom, an American reality television music competition show

== Adaptations of Woon Swee Oan's novel ==
Films and television series with the title The Four adapted from Woon Swee Oan's novel Si Da Ming Bu (四大名捕; The Four Great Constables) include:

- The Four (2008 TV series), a 2008 Hong Kong television series
- The Four (film), a 2012 Chinese film, and its sequels The Four II (2013) and The Four III (2014)
- The Four (2015 TV series), a 2015 Chinese television series

== See also ==
- Four (disambiguation)
