= Lonely Road (album) =

Studio album by the Red Jumpsuit Apparatus
- Released: February 3, 2009
- Recorded: March 2008
- Studios: Valley Village, California
- Genres: Alternative rock; pop-punk; post-grunge; hard rock; emo pop
- Length: 40:17
- Label: Virgin
- Producer: Howard Benson

The Red Jumpsuit Apparatus chronology
Don't You Fake It (2006)	Lonely Road (2009)	Am I the Enemy (2011)

Singles from Lonely Road
- 1. "You Better Pray" Released: October 15, 2008; 2. "Pen & Paper" Released: February 27, 2009

Lonely Road is the second studio album by American rock band the Red Jumpsuit Apparatus. The album was released on February 3, 2009. The album received a mixed reception from critics. Lonely Road debuted at number 14 on the Billboard 200 and spawned two singles: "You Better Pray" and "Pen & Paper". To promote the record, the band toured across Asia, Australia and North America, with appearances at music festivals.

== Background ==
In March 2008, Alternative Press reported that the band were currently in the studio.

== Release ==
"You Better Pray" was posted on the band's Myspace profile on November 7, 2008, before being released to radio on November 18, 2008. On November 22, 2008, it was announced that the group's next album, Lonely Road, would be released in three months' time. In the same announcement, the album's track listing was revealed. On December 5, 2008, "Pen & Paper" was released as a free download. Shortly afterwards, the band toured throughout the remainder of the month. On December 15, a music video for "You Better Pray" premiered on MTV2's Unleashed programme. A day later, it was revealed that guitarist Elias Reidy had left the band back two months prior. In addition, the album's cover art was posted. Following this, the band started touring again in early January, running into early February. On January 14, 2009, "Pull Me Back" and "Represent" were posted on te band's Myspace. On January 28, the band's show in Toronto was cancelled due to a snow storm.

Three weeks before the debut of the album, the songs "Represent", "Pull Me Back" and "Believe" were made available for free streaming from their website. On January 23, the album was made available for streaming through the band's Myspace. Lonely Road was released on February 3 through major label Virgin Records. The vinyl version of the album featured different artwork and included the album on the CD. The band went on tour in Asia later in February, followed by an appearance at Soundwave festival in Australia in February and March. "Pen & Paper" impacted radio on March 3. In April, the band went on a tour of the US with Secondhand Serenade. On August 19, 2009, a music video was released for "Pen & Paper".

== Reception ==
=== Critical reception ===
Professional ratings
Aggregate scores
Source	Rating
Metacritic	54/100
Review scores
Source	Rating
AllMusic	1.5/5 stars
Alternative Addiction	3.5/5 stars
Alternative Press	3/5 stars
Rock on Request	(favorable) link
Rolling Stone	2.5/5 stars

Lonely Road garnered mixed reviews from music critics. At Metacritic, which assigns a normalized rating out of 100 to reviews from mainstream critics, the album received an average score of 54, based on 5 reviews. A writer from Alternative Addiction wrote that the band "expanded outside their pop punk sound", saying that "No Spell" and the title track contain "a heavy dose of pop" and both "You Better Pray" and "Pleads and Postcards" "blend[s] into the rock territory," saying they've "added on some new things that they couldn’t or didn’t do with the last album and they built on the things they did well." Rolling Stone's Christian Hoard said about the record, "The band skips between emo pop and orchestral pomp while applying plenty of major-label gloss. The result: Much of the time the Jumpsuits end up sounding like a lesser version of Hawthorne Heights." AllMusic writer Andrew Leahey panned the album for overreaching on tracks that either contain "symphonic string schmaltz and fist-pumping guitars ("Represent")" or get excessive by adding "an honest-to-God gospel during the title track," and criticized Ronnie Winter's vocal delivery of "acrobatic flips around every melody, oversinging the songs within an inch of their lives." He concluded that "Don't You Fake It may have suffered from a lack of variety, but Lonely Road is plagued by different diseases: misguided ambition, outlandish excess, and a bad case of the ol' sophomore slump."

=== Commercial performance ===
The album debuted at number 14 on the Billboard 200, selling 26,000 copies in its first week. It outperformed their debut effort Don't You Fake It, which placed at number 25 and sold 1,000 fewer copies.

== Track listing ==
No.	Title	Length
1.	"You Better Pray"	3:35
2.	"No Spell"	3:03
3.	"Pen & Paper"	3:24
4.	"Represent"	3:24
5.	"Pull Me Back"	3:10
6.	"Step Right Up"	3:47
7.	"Believe"	4:14
8.	"Pleads and Postcards"	3:28
9.	"Lonely Road"	4:14
10.	"Senioritis"	2:20
11.	"Godspeed"	5:38
Total length:		40:17

== Personnel ==
- Ronnie Winter – lead vocals, keyboard
- Elias Reidy – lead guitar, backing vocals
- Duke Kitchens – rhythm guitar
- Joey Westwood – bass guitar
- Jon Wilkes – drums, percussion

== Charts ==
Chart performance for Lonely Road
Chart (2009)	Peak position
Australian Albums (ARIA)	41
Canadian Albums (Billboard)	35
US Billboard 200	14
US Top Alternative Albums (Billboard)	3
US Top Rock Albums (Billboard)	5
