= The Aggrolites =

American reggae band

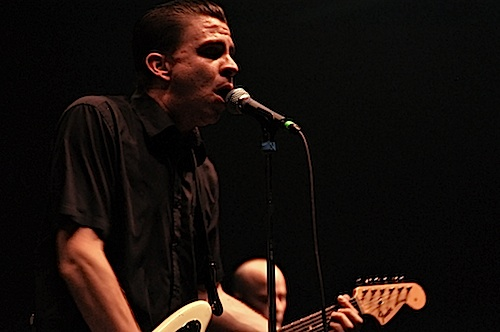
- The Aggrolites vocalist Jesse Wagner

Background information
- Origin: Los Angeles, California, United States
- Genres: Reggae, ska
- Years active: 2002–present
- Labels: Axe, Hellcat, Young Cub, Pirates Press Records
- Spinoffs: The Vessels, The Rhythm Doctors
- Members: Jesse Wagner; Chris Borbon; Roger Rivas; Chris Brennan; Eric Mauries
- Past members: Scott Abels; J Bonner; David Fuentes (deceased); Korey Horn; Brian Dixon; Matt Parker; Ricky Chacon; Alex McKenzie; Jeff Roffredo
- Website: Official site

The Aggrolites are an American reggae band from Los Angeles, California, United States, which formed in 2002.

== Overview ==
The Aggrolites are an amalgamation of two previous Los Angeles reggae and ska bands, the Vessels and the Rhythm Doctors. They formed in 2002 as a live backing band for reggae icon Derrick Morgan, and were asked to record music for a new Morgan album. The project was never released, but the recording sessions inspired the Aggrolites to become a permanent band. They have served as the backing band for Phyllis Dillon, Scotty, Joseph Hill of Culture, Prince Buster, and Tim Armstrong.

Regarding their musical style, Aggrolites organist Roger Rivas has stated that a combination of the sounds of 1960s soul music, funk, and skinhead reggae (also known simply as early reggae) constitutes what the band has dubbed "Dirty Reggae".

In 2003, the Aggrolites released their debut album, Dirty Reggae, on local reggae label Axe Records. The album was recorded at Signet Studios in Los Angeles in one day, with each song recorded in one take, and with many lyrics improvised on the spot. In November 2004, the Aggrolites were featured on Hellcat Records compilation Give 'Em the Boot IV, and were officially signed to Hellcat in October 2005. The Aggrolites' self-titled Hellcat debut was released on May 9, 2006. In December 2006 they toured the UK as the support band for Madness. The Aggrolites collaborated with Rancid frontman Tim Armstrong for his solo album, A Poet's Life. They provided the instrumentals with Armstrong as lead singer.

They released a new album on June 5, 2007, called Reggae Hit L.A., which won an IGN award for Best Reggae Album of 2007.

The Aggrolites made an appearance on the Nick Jr./Apple TV+ show Yo Gabba Gabba!, created by Christian Jacobs, lead singer of The Aquabats.

In mid-2007, original bassist J Bonner quit the band and played his last show on August 12, 2007, in Washington DC. He was replaced by Hepcat bassist David Fuentes. Fuentes died on September 23, 2007.

The band entered the studio in early 2009 to record their fourth album. It was released June 9, 2009, and titled IV.

The band kicked off a US tour in October 2009 before joining Slightly Stoopid for a run of dates in November 2009.

The band released their fifth studio album, Rugged Road, on February 22, 2011. It is their first album for Young Cub Records.

In 2015 the band released three new songs on Bandcamp. Later those songs were re-recorded for their sixth studio album, Reggae Now!, released on May 24, 2019. It is their first album for Pirates Press Records.

In 2020 the band recorded and streamed a live show during the Covid pandemic and later released it as a digital album through channels like Spotify and Bandcamp. The live show consisted of classic Aggrolites tunes and covers.

In 2026 the band released a new LP, "Super Atomic" through Pirates Press Records.

== Members ==
=== Current members ===
- Roger Rivas – piano, organ
- Jesse Wagner – lead vocals, guitar
- Chris Brennan – guitar, backup vocals
- Chris "Krees" Borbon – drums, backup vocals
- Eric Mauries – bass guitar, backup vocals

=== Past members ===
- Scott Abels – drums (2004–2006)
- J Bonner – bass guitar
- David Fuentes – bass guitar (2007, deceased)
- Korey Horn – drums
- Brian Dixon – rhythm guitar
- Matt Parker – organ (2002)
- Alex McKenzie – drums
- Jeff Roffredo – bass guitar
- Ricky Chacon – rhythm guitar

== Films ==
The band's song "Free Time" from the album Reggae Hit L.A. was featured in the film Bandslam. The band's song "Work to Do" was featured in the film 50/50.

== Discography ==
=== Albums ===
- Dirty Reggae, Axe Records, 2003
- The Aggrolites, Hellcat Records, 2006
- Reggae Hit L.A., Hellcat Records, 2007
- IV, Hellcat Records, 2009
- Rugged Road, Young Cub Records, 2011
- Unleashed Live Vol.1, Independently (US) / Brixton Records (Europe/Australia) / Ska in the World (Japan) 2012
- Reggae Now!, Pirates Press Records, 2019
- Live From the Compound, Digital Album, Spotify, Bandcamp, 2020
- Super Atomic, Pirates Press Records, 2026

==== Compilations ====
- Give 'Em the Boot IV (2004)
- Give 'Em the Boot V (2006)
- Give 'Em the Boot VI (2007)
- Warped Tour 2008 Tour Compilation (2008)
- The Lone Ranger: Wanted – Music Inspired by the Film (2013)

=== DVDs ===
- Live in Santa Monica (2007)

=== Music videos ===
- "Don't Let Me Down" (live) (2006)
- "Reggae Hit L.A." (2007)
- "Free Time" (2007)
- "Complicated Girl" (2011)
- "Trial and Error" (2011)
- "Pound for Pound" (2019)
