= Am I the Enemy =

Studio album by the Red Jumpsuit Apparatus
- Released: August 30, 2011
- Recorded: November–December 2010
- Genre: Post-hardcore; alternative rock
- Length: 40:19
- Label: Collective; Universal
- Producer: John Feldmann

The Red Jumpsuit Apparatus chronology
Lonely Road (2009)	Am I the Enemy (2011)	4 (2014)

Singles from Am I the Enemy
- 1. "Reap" Released: March 24, 2011; 2. "Am I the Enemy" Released: August 16, 2011

Am I the Enemy is the third album by the American rock band the Red Jumpsuit Apparatus.

== Composition and recording ==
The album marks a return to the aggressive post-hardcore sound of their first album Don't You Fake It as opposed to the polished hard rock featured on Lonely Road. The album saw the band working with the punk producer John Feldmann, who had previously worked with such bands as Escape the Fate, Story of the Year, the Used and Saosin. Feldmann also mixed the album, and arranged and co-wrote all the songs on the album along with vocalist Ronnie Winter.

"Choke" previously appeared on the band's 2010 The Hell or High Water EP and was released as that EP's lead single.

== Release ==
The lead single, "Reap", was released to radio stations on March 24, 2011, and later released on iTunes on April 26. Two other tracks from the album, "Salvation" and "Fall from Grace", were released on YouTube on May 24. "Dive Too Deep", the second single off the album, and "Dreams" were released through grammy.com and Rolling Stone magazine, respectively, on July 27. July 31 saw the premiere of another song, "Where Are the Heroes?", on Alternative Addiction magazine. Another song, "Don't Lose Hope", was streamed on AOL's music blog on August 8. The album went up for pre-order on iTunes on August 10.

The song "Wake Me Up" was streamed on the Alternative Press website on August 14. "Am I the Enemy" was released to radio on August 16, 2011. It was released on August 30, 2011.

== Track listing ==
All lyrics written by Ronnie Winter. All music written by Ronnie Winter and John Feldmann, except where noted.

No.	Title	Length
1.	"Salvation"	3:35
2.	"Reap"	3:22
3.	"Wake Me Up"	3:28
4.	"Am I the Enemy"	3:18
5.	"Dreams"	3:36
6.	"Dive Too Deep" (Winter, John Kitchens, and Matt Carter)	3:29
7.	"Where Are the Heroes?" (Winter, Feldmann, Carter, and Kevin Griffin)	3:09
8.	"Angel in Disguise"	3:43
9.	"Don't Lose Hope" (Winter, Carter, and David Hodges)	3:25
10.	"Fall from Grace" (Winter, Kitchens, and Carter)	3:02
11.	"Choke" (Winter, Kitchens, and Carter)	2:50
12.	"Reap" (Radio edit)	3:22
Total length:		40:19

iTunes bonus tracks
No.	Title	Length
13.	"Forever Numb"	3:00
14.	"You Get Me High"	4:40
15.	"Salvation" (lyric video)	3:44
16.	"Reap" (lyric video)	3:30

amitheenemy.com hidden track
No.	Title	Length
15.	"Not Like Before"	3:52

== Reception ==
Professional ratings
Review scores
Source	Rating
AbsolutePunk	40%
AllMusic	3/5 stars
Sputnikmusic	2.5/5 stars
Rockfreaks.net	6.5/10 stars

The album received mixed reviews upon release.

== Personnel ==
The Red Jumpsuit Apparatus

- Ronnie Winter – lead vocals, keyboard
- Matt Carter – lead guitar
- Duke Kitchens – rhythm guitar
- Joey Westwood – bass guitar
- Jon Wilkes – drums, percussion

Production

- John Feldmann – producer, arranger, composer, engineer, mixing, programming, vocals
- Brandon Paddock – arranger, engineer, programming
- Spencer Hoad – engineer
- Joe Gastwirt – mastering
