= Citybus Route 4 =

Bus route in Hong Kong

4
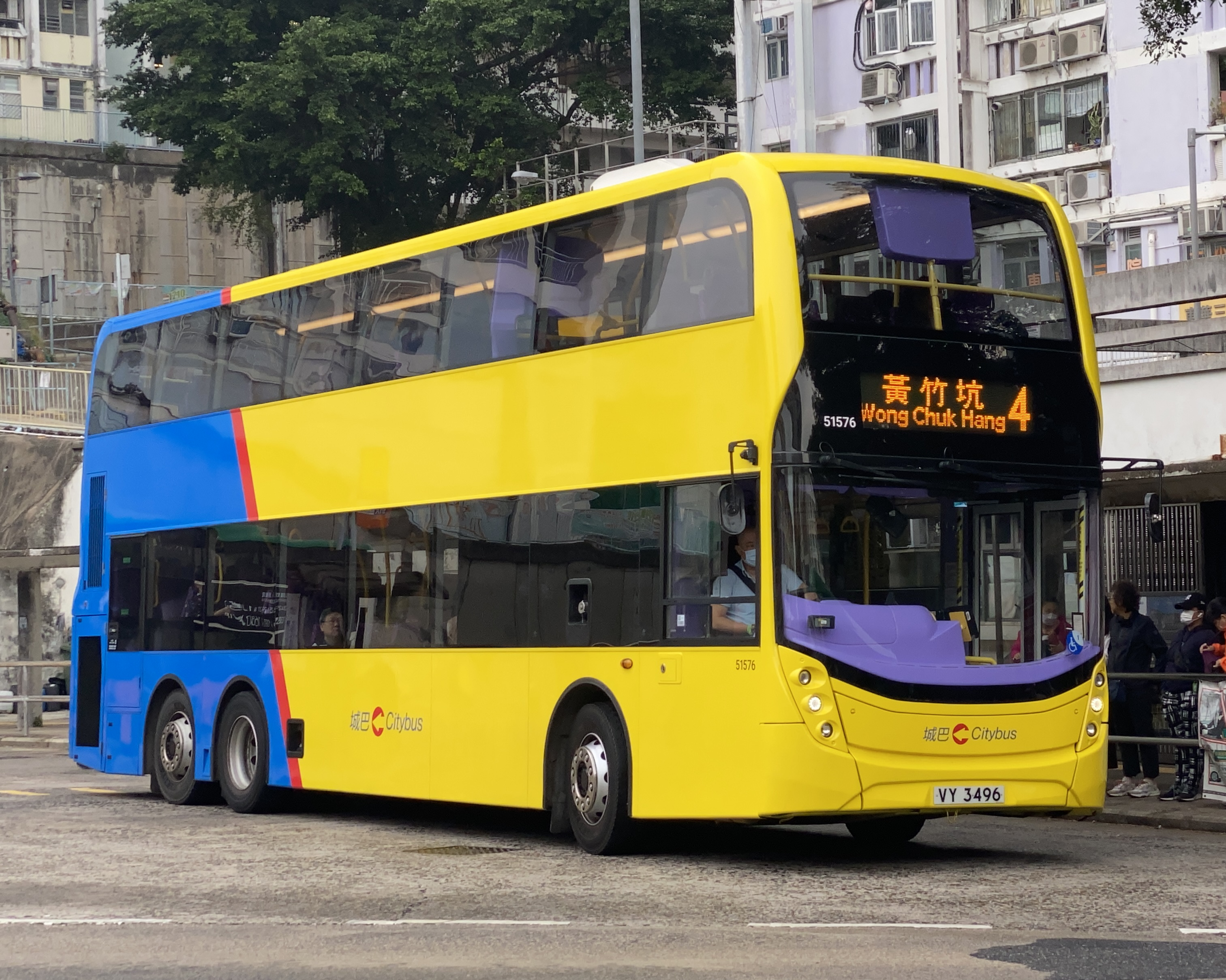
- An Alexander Dennis Enviro500 MMC on route 4 at Wah Fu (South) terminus in December 2023

Overview
- Operator: Citybus
- Vehicle: Dennis Trident 3 (11XX-11XX/14XX/30XX) / Alexander Dennis Enviro500 (40XX/55XX)

Route
- Start: Wong Chuk Hang
- Via: Aberdeen; Wah Fu Estate; Queen Mary Hospital; The University of Hong Kong; Sai Ying Pun; Sheung Wan
- End: Central (Exchange Square) Bus Terminus

Service
- Level: Daily
- Frequency: Every 20–25 minutes (weekdays); Every 15–20 minutes (weekends and public holidays)
- Operates: 05:30 until 23:50

Urban Route No.4 is a bus route on Hong Kong Island operated by Citybus. It runs between Wong Chuk Hang and Central (Exchange Square) Bus Terminus, via Aberdeen, Wah Fu Estate, Pok Fu Lam Road and Sai Ying Pun.

== History ==
The route was first started by The Hongkong and Shanghai Hotels in the 1920s between Blake Pier in Central and the University of Hong Kong by way of Sai Ying Pun, with no route number. On 11 June 1933 CMB took over the route as part of the Hong Kong Island bus service franchise, and given the number 4. In the next year, the Central terminus was moved to the piers of Hongkong and Yaumati Ferry. On 1 April 1935, circular arrangement was implemented, running in anti-clockwise direction, taking Bonham Road and Caine Road for Central bound. On 14 June 1937, service was extended to Queen Mary Hospital, and the circular arrangement was cancelled. No service was provided during Japanese occupation of Hong Kong.

Service was resumed on 16 April 1946 between Central Ferry Piers and Queen Mary Hospital, with initially only two buses running and a frequency of one hour per bus, to be increased gradually. On 3 October 1968, the route was further extended to Wah Fu Estate with the completion of the estate's first phase. Since transportation was inconvenient for the estate, route 4 became the major means of transportation for the residents. As the population of Wah Fu increased, an express service was implemented in 1971, which faced delays caused congestion problems along Des Voeux Road West. On 1 May 1972, the express service was rerouted to serve Caine Road and Bonham Road in Mid-Levels to bypass the congestion, seeing full daytime service and becoming a normal route, denoted by red text on yellow background. On 1 January 1975 the express service was renumbered 40.

On 11 September 1972, the Central terminus moved to a bus terminus opposite to Hang Seng Bank headquarters, on 5 December 1994 to Harbour View Street, and on 17 March 1995 to the new ferry piers. On 1 September 1998, the route was taken over by New World First Bus as part of the franchise handover. Air-conditioning of the route started on 11 July 1999 and completed in 2000.

The route has seen a drop of patronage since the 1990s with Citybus taking over some of the Wah Fu routes and having lower fares than route 4. On 19 December 2004, the route became a circular route, and ceased to serve Hong Kong station and the ferry piers.

As a result of Citybus Route 71 reduced service to weekday morning peak only, route 4 was extended to Wong Chuk Hang effective 11 October 2021 (weekday morning peak service keeps the original route).

== Current route ==
Route 4 currently operates via the following locations:-

- Wong Chuk Hang
- Aberdeen
- Wah Fu Estate
- Queen Mary Hospital
- The University of Hong Kong
- MTR HKU station
- Sai Ying Pun
- Sheung Wan
- Central

On Sundays and public holidays, journeys operating from Wong Chuk Hang will call at additional stops at the Central Ferry Piers.

During the morning peak of Mondays to Saturdays, services would operate from Wah Fu (South) as a circular bus route to Central. Also, three departures would operate from Tin Wan Estate, resuming the routeing of morning peak departures at Wah Fu (South) after serving Wah Kwai Estate.

=== Express service ===
On Mondays to Saturdays, there is an express service which roughly runs on the same route and labelled with 4X, which skips Sai Ying Pun on its outbound journey, and call at additional stops at the Central Ferry Piers and Central (Exchange Square) Bus Terminus. It also skips Sheung Wan and most of Sai Ying Pun on its return journey in morning peak hours.
