= The Aggrolites (album) =

Studio album by The Aggrolites
- Released: May 9, 2006
- Recorded: January 2006
- Genre: Reggae
- Length: 66:00
- Label: Hellcat Records
- Producer: The Aggrolites

The Aggrolites chronology
| Dirty Reggae (2003) | The Aggrolites (2006) | Reggae Hit L.A. (2007) |

Professional ratings
Review scores
| Source | Rating |
|---|---|
| AbsolutePunk.net | (90%) |
| Allmusic | 4/5 stars |

The Aggrolites is the self-titled album by a band of the same name, released in 2006. It is their second album overall and first on Hellcat.

== Track listing ==
1. "Funky Fire" - 4:10
2. "Mr. Misery" - 3:34
3. "Time to Get Tough" - 2:23
4. "Thunder Fist" - 2:50
5. "Countryman Fiddle" - 3:49
6. "Work to Do" - 3:02
7. "Death at Ten Paces" - 2:53
8. "Someday" - 4:15
9. "The Volcano" - 3:03
10. "Heavier Than Lead" - 3:27
11. "Sound of Bomshell" - 2:57
12. "Fury Now" - 3:10
13. "5 Deadly Venoms" - 3:15
14. "Grave Digger" - 3:49
15. "Prisoner Song" - 3:52
16. "Love Isn't Love" - 3:49
17. "Sound by the Pound" - 3:48
18. "Lightning & Thunder" - 3:39
19. "A.G.G.R.O." - 4:24

All songs by The Aggrolites.

== Personnel ==
- Jesse Wagner - vocals, guitar
- Brian Dixon - rhythm guitar
- J Bonner - bass
- Roger Rivas - organ, keyboards
- Scott Abels - drums
- Tom Cook - trombone
- Eitan Avineri - trumpet
- Jeff Roffredo - backing vocals
- Gene Grimaldi - mastering
- David Jiro - photography
