= Reggae Hit L.A. =

Studio album by The Aggrolites
- Released: June 5, 2007
- Recorded: Kingsize Soundlabs, Eagle Rock, Los Angeles
- Genre: Reggae
- Length: 70:48
- Label: Hellcat Records
- Producer: The Aggrolites

The Aggrolites chronology
The Aggrolites (2006)	Reggae Hit L.A. (2007)	IV (2009)

Professional ratings
Review scores
Source	Rating
Allmusic	4.5/5 stars
Okayplayer	3.5/5 stars
ReadJunk.com	4.5/5 stars
Rockfeedback	3/5 stars
Rolling Stone	2.5/5 stars

Reggae Hit L.A. is the third full-length studio album from Los Angeles reggae band The Aggrolites. It is also their second album for Hellcat Records, following their May 2006 self-titled release. The album was released 2 weeks after Tim Armstrong's debut album, A Poet's Life, on which The Aggrolites served as the backing band.

A video for "Free Time" was released in early July 2007.

The album won an IGN award for Best Reggae Album of 2007.

== Track listing ==
All songs written, recorded, mixed, and produced by The Aggrolites.

1. "Work It" - 4:14
2. "Faster Bullet" - 3:12
3. "You Got 5" - 2:53
4. "Reconcile" - 4:33
5. "Reggae Hit L.A." - 3:06
6. "Let's Pack Our Bags" - 4:10
7. "Left Red" - 3:05
8. "Free Time" - 3:01
9. "Lucky Streak" - 3:06
10. "Rhythm & Light" - 4:03
11. "Well Runs Dry (a.k.a. Free Soul)" - 3:31
12. "Hip to It" - 2:58
13. "Fire Girl" - 3:20
14. "Baldhead Rooster" - 3:11
15. "We Came to Score" - 3:50
16. "Hidden Track" - 18:35
  - The hidden track is composed primarily of repeating drum beats.
  - There is also another hidden track on this album. If one rewinds the CD from the beginning of "Work It", there is a honky-tonk style instrumental version of the song "Countryman Fiddle" from their previous (self-titled) album.

== Credits ==
- Jesse Wagner - Vocals, Lead Guitar
- Roger Rivas - Organ, Piano
- Brian Dixon - Rhythm Guitar
- J Bonner - Bass
- Korey "Kingston" Horn - Drums

=== Additional Musicians ===
- Tom Cook - Trombone
- Boogie Jones - Saxophone
- Eitan Avineri - Trumpet
- MC Junor Francis - DJ on "You Got 5"
- Background chants by Nicki Mansuetti, Christina Wagner, and Gabe Aguirre

=== Other Credits ===
- Mastered by Gene Grimaldi at Oasis in Burbank, CA
- Richard P. Robinson - Assistant Engineer
- Artwork by The Aggrolites
- Front cover photo by Robert Cortez
- Back cover photo by Chris Gomez
- Collage by J Bonner and Nicki Mansuetti
