= Number Four =

Number Four may refer to:

- 4 (number), a number, numeral, and glyph
- A hamlet in the town of Watson, New York
- #4, the pseudonym of American musician Jim Root, when performing with Slipknot
- A character from the Earthworm Jim video games and animated series
- Numbuh Four, a character from Codename: Kids Next Door
- A predominantly defensive position in polo
- Jean Béliveau (1931–2014), Canadiens hockey player, frequently known by his sweater number, number 4
- A character also known as Simon in the reimagined Battlestar Galactica
- A character in the 2011 film I Am Number Four, based on the 2010 book of the same name
- "Number Four" (single), a 2013 single by My Chemical Romance
- Number 4 (album), also styled as #4, a 2005 album by Ling Tosite Sigure

== See also ==
- Four (disambiguation)
