= 4 Train =

4 Train may refer to:

- 4 (New York City Subway service)
- Yellow Line (Montreal Metro), also known as Line 4
- Paris Metro Line 4
- Line 4 (Beijing Subway)
- Line 4 (Shanghai Metro)

== See also ==
- Line 4 (disambiguation)
