= 4 (Los Angeles Railway) =

Former lines of the Los Angeles Railway

Overview
- Locale: Los Angeles

Service
- Type: Streetcar
- System: Los Angeles Railway

History
- Opened: May 9, 1939 (second vers.)
- Closed: October 1941 (second vers.)

Technical
- Track gauge: 3 ft 6 in (1,067 mm)
- Electrification: Overhead line, 600 V DC

4 was the number assigned to two distinct streetcar lines operated by the Los Angeles Railway in Los Angeles, California.

== History ==
=== 1931 alignment ===
4 was first assigned to a short turn service of the 3 Line. This operated from 1931 to 1935 when all operations along the route reverted to 3 Line service.

=== 1939 alignment ===
The number was later assigned to the Boyle Street Shuttle (previously line 31) beginning May 19, 1939. This service was short lived and ceased in October 1941.
