= Immigration Voice =

- Tax ID no.: 20-4110064
- Legal status: 501(c)(4) nonprofit organization
- Purpose: To solve problems in the employment-based green card process.
- Headquarters: San Jose, California, United States
- Coordinates: 37.262677°N 121.879024°W
- Revenue: $615,403 (2019)
- Expenses: $456,360 (2019)
- Employees: 0 (2019)

Immigration Voice is a 501(c)(4) nonprofit organization advocating to alleviate problems faced by high-skilled immigrant workers in the United States, through the legislative branch of congress.

== History ==
Immigration Voice is a 501(c)(4) non-profit organization that helps immigrants through legislative and executive branches of government, solving problems in the employment-based immigration process. The organization focuses on engaging with both legislative and executive branches of the government to advocate for reforms aimed at improving the employment-based immigration system. Through its advocacy efforts, Immigration Voice seeks to promote fairness within the immigration system, ensuring that both immigrants and American workers are adequately protected.

== Goals and accomplishments ==
On May 8, 2014, the U.S. Department of Homeland Security announced proposed regulations that will allow dependent spouses of certain principal workers to be able to request employment authorization. The current rules are stopping thousands of immigrant spouses living legally in the United States from working while waiting on their permanent residency. The extreme backlogs are making families from certain countries struggle, most notably India; current rules cause financial stress over many years and denying the U.S. economy of the talents of these high-skilled future Americans.
