= Central (Exchange Square) Bus Terminus =

Bus terminus in Hong Kong

Central (Exchange Square) 中環（交易廣場）
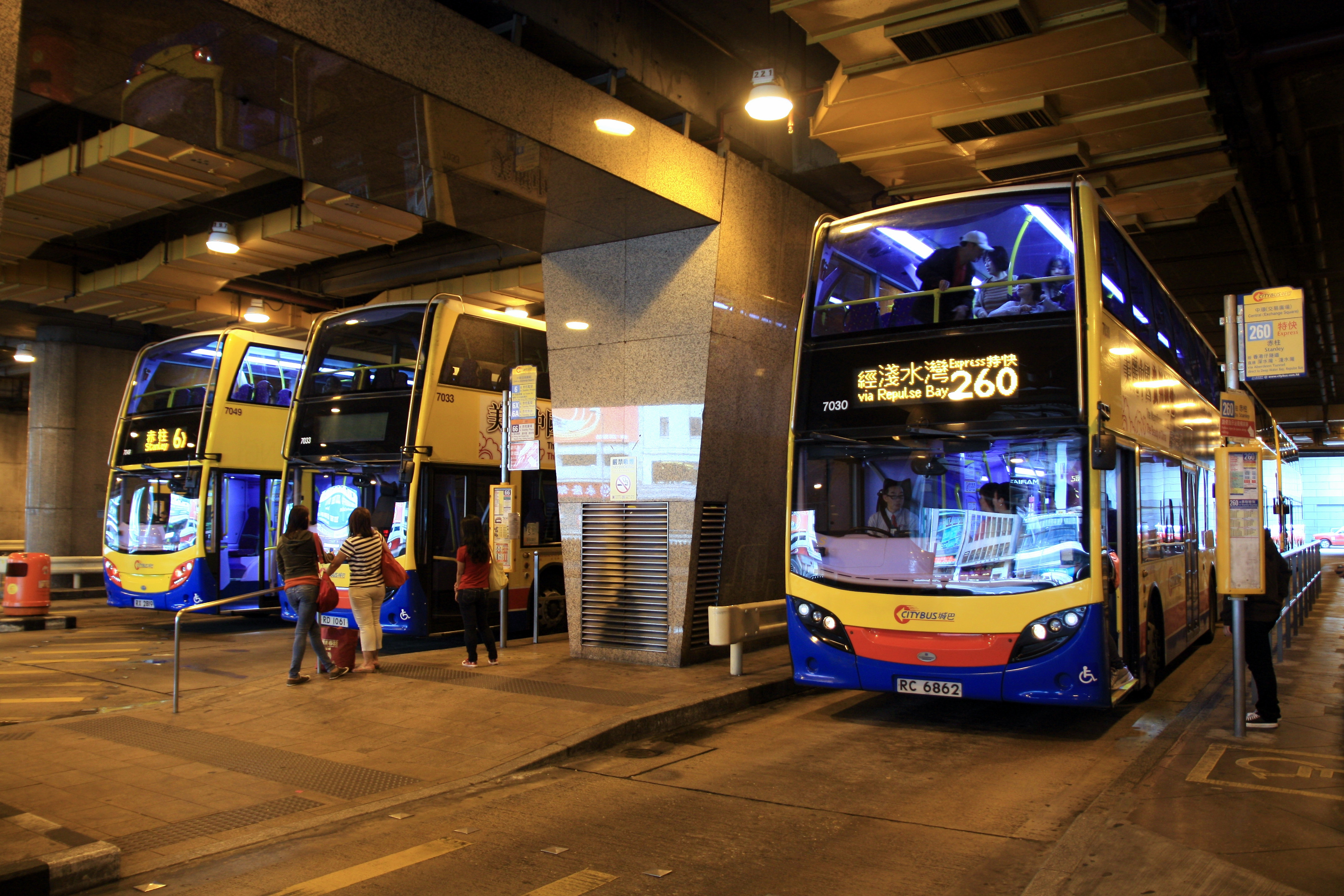

General information
- Location: Ground floor, Exchange Square, 8 Connaught Place; Central; Central and Western
- Connections: Feeder transport: MTR Tung Chung line and Airport Express at Hong Kong station; Major structures/sights nearby: Exchange Square, Hong Kong station and Jardine House

History
- Opened: 1 February 1985; 41 years ago

The Central (Exchange Square) Bus Terminus (Chinese: 中環（交易廣場）巴士總站) is a major bus terminus located in Central, Central and Western District, Hong Kong. Situated on the ground floor of the Exchange Square commercial complex, the terminus is regarded as the central hub of bus routes in the Central District.

With a total of 14 berths for franchised buses, Central (Exchange Square) is now the largest bus station in Hong Kong which still functions as a bus terminus, in terms of the number of boarding platforms.

== Location and structure ==
Central (Exchange Square) Bus Terminus is situated on the ground floor of the Exchange Square complex, which consists of 3 office blocks. The bus terminus is located beneath Two Exchange Square and Three Exchange Square.

The terminus consists of 14 boarding/alighting platforms for franchised bus routes. In addition to the franchised bus terminus, a smaller station with a public light bus terminus, a public loading/unloading area as well as a taxi stand is located under One Exchange Square.

For the franchised bus terminus, buses enter via the three entrances located at Harbour View Street, and leave the terminus through the two exits at Connaught Road Central; for the minibus and taxi stand, both the entrance and the exit are located on Harbour View Street.

== Routes serving the terminus ==
As of August 2012, 18 franchised bus routes terminate at Exchange Square, most of them being local routes serving the Southern District (including the area around Aberdeen Harbour as well as Stanley) as well as cross-harbour routes to points in the New Territories.

== Feeder transport ==
- MTR Tung Chung line and Airport Express Hong Kong station

== See also ==
- Exchange Square (Hong Kong)
