= IV (The Aggrolites album) =

Studio album by The Aggrolites
- Released: June 9, 2009
- Recorded: Kingsize Soundlabs, Los Angeles, California, 2009
- Genre: Reggae
- Label: Hellcat Records

The Aggrolites chronology
Reggae Hit L.A. (2007)	IV (2009)	Rugged Road (2011)

Professional ratings
Review scores
Source	Rating
Allmusic	3.5/5 stars

IV is the fourth studio album from reggae band The Aggrolites. It is the band's third album for Hellcat Records.

Prior to the album's release, the band posted "The Sufferer" on their Myspace page. "It's Gonna Be OK" was also included on the ANTI- Sampler 2009 which was posted on Amazon.com for free download.

== Track listing ==
All tracks are credited to Jesse Wagner, Jeff Roffredo, Brian Dixon and Roger Rivas.

1. "Firecracker" - 4:31
2. "What A Complex" - 3:59
3. "Wild Time" - 3:02
4. "Feelin' Alright" - 4:00
5. "The Sufferer" - 3:09
6. "It's Time To Go" - 3:58
7. "By Her Side" - 3:32
8. "Brother Jacob" - 3:55
9. "Musically On Top" - 3:14
10. "Reggae Summertime" - 4:11
11. "Ever Want To Try" - 3:09
12. "Keep Moving On" - 4:00
13. "Tear That Falls" - 3:09
14. "Gotta Find Someone Better" - 4:00
15. "Lick It Up" - 4:12
16. "The Least I Could Do" - 2:52
17. "Runnin' Strong" - 2:41
18. "Precious and Few" - 3:46
19. "Tonight" - 3:04
20. "Soul Gathering" - 2:35
21. "It's Gonna Be OK" - 4:06

== Personnel ==
- Jesse Wagner: Lead Vocals / Guitar / Backup Vocals
- Roger Rivas: Piano / Organ / Group Vocals
- Brian Dixon: Guitar / Group Vocals
- Jeff Rofredo: Bass / Backup Vocals

=== Additional musicians ===
- Scott Abels: Drums, Percussion
- Korey "Kingston" Horn: Drums on "Feelin' Alright", "By Her Side", "The Least I Could Do", "Runnin' Strong"
- Efren Santana: Saxophone
- Tom Cook: Trombone
- Todd Simon: Trumpet

=== Other credits ===
- Recorded at Kingsize Soundlabs in Eagle Rock, California
- All songs written, recorded, mixed, and produced by Dixon/Rivas/Rofredo/Wagner (BMI)
- Mastered by Gene Grimaldi at Oasis in Burbank, CA
- 2nd Engineer: Richard P. Robinson
- Artwork by Roger Rivas and Tom D. Kline
- Photography by Jiro Schneider
