= Plus four =

Plus four may refer to:

- Plus fours, trousers that extend four inches below the knee
- Plus/4, a home computer released in 1984
- Morgan +4, a sports car produced by the Morgan Motor Company
- ZIP+4, a United States ZIP code add-on
- Max Roach + 4, a 1956 album by Max Roach
- Sonny Rollins Plus 4, a 1956 album by Sonny Rollins
