= Face Down (The Red Jumpsuit Apparatus song) =

2006 single by the Red Jumpsuit Apparatus

Single by the Red Jumpsuit Apparatus

from the album Don't You Fake It
- Released: July 4, 2006
- Genre: Emo; pop-punk; hard rock
- Length: 3:12
- Label: Virgin
- Songwriter: Ronnie Winter
- Producer: David Bendeth

The Red Jumpsuit Apparatus singles chronology
"Face Down" (2006)	"False Pretense" (2007)

"Face Down" is a song by American rock band the Red Jumpsuit Apparatus from their debut album, Don't You Fake It (2006). Released as the band's debut single, the song peaked at number 24 in the United States and number four in New Zealand. It tied 30 Seconds to Mars' "The Kill" as the longest-running song on the US Billboard Modern Rock Tracks chart without reaching number one, at 52 weeks. "Face Down" remains the band's most successful single. Four versions were released, including an acoustic version.

It has since been certified quadruple platinum in the US by the Recording Industry Association of America (RIAA) and double platinum in New Zealand by Recorded Music NZ (RMNZ). Even though the song never charted in the United Kingdom, it has since been certified gold by the British Phonographic Industry (BPI).

== Lyrics ==
"Face Down" has lyrics that detail suffering from domestic abuse. Written by lead singer Ronnie Winter, the song is about the domestic abuse that his mother experienced when he and his brother were children. He told Nylon in 2016: "My mom and my dad were both using drugs and alcohol at that time, and, to a degree, domestic violence comes along with it. My brothers and I were subjected to it on a daily basis until the wheels fell off, and [we] ended up being adopted by our grandparents. We finally had some stability, but for a while, it was fairly dark. I was writing about what was relevant to me—something I went through and survived." He told Alternative Press the song was "a snippet into [his] life from the age of zero into about nine."

He has said the "lyrics are deeply personal" and he wanted to "help kids who are in similar situations cope."

== Music video ==
The music video parallels the song in its treatment of violence in a relationship. After arriving home, a young woman examines a bruise on her lower back, and begins to look for and examine items that she associates with her boyfriend (e.g. pictures, a card, letters). As she does so, objects around her start to suddenly move as if thrown or destroyed by the unseen hand of an abuser. The level of damage done escalates throughout the video, though the young woman does not react or acknowledge the growing violence around her. After a chair flies through the living room window, she takes the pictures and letters and throws them into a garbage can outside her house. This unfolding scene is intercut with shots of the band performing the song in the woman's living room.

== Charts ==
=== Weekly charts ===
Weekly chart performance for "Face Down"
Chart (2007)	Peak position
Canada (Canadian Hot 100)	43
New Zealand (Recorded Music NZ)	4
US Billboard Hot 100	24
US Adult Top 40 (Billboard)	18
US Mainstream Rock (Billboard)	38
US Mainstream Top 40 (Billboard)	10
US Modern Rock Tracks (Billboard)	3

=== Year-end charts ===
Year-end chart performance for "Face Down"
Chart (2007)	Position
New Zealand (RIANZ)	44
US Billboard Hot 100	52
US Modern Rock Tracks (Billboard)	6

== Certifications ==
Certifications for "Face Down"
Region	Certification	Certified units/sales
New Zealand (RMNZ)	2× Platinum	60,000^{‡}
United Kingdom (BPI)	Gold	400,000^{‡}
United States (RIAA)	5× Platinum	5,000,000^{‡}
^{‡} Sales+streaming figures based on certification alone.

== Release history ==
Release dates and formats for "Face Down"
Region	Date	Format	Label(s)	Ref.
United States	October 30, 2006	Mainstream airplay	Virgin	

== In popular culture ==
"Face Down" is featured on the soundtrack of the video games Saints Row 2 and MX vs. ATV Untamed.
