= Don't You Fake It =

Studio album by the Red Jumpsuit Apparatus
- Released: July 18, 2006
- Recorded: December 2005 – January 2006
- Studios: Water Music Recorders, Hoboken, New Jersey
- Genres: Post-hardcore; pop-punk; alternative rock; emo
- Length: 35:18
- Label: Virgin
- Producer: David Bendeth

The Red Jumpsuit Apparatus chronology
The Red Jumpsuit Apparatus (2004)	Don't You Fake It (2006)	Lonely Road (2009)

Deluxe edition
- "Deluxe Edition" cover

Singles from Don't You Fake It
- 1. "Face Down" Released: July 4, 2006; 2. "False Pretense" Released: March 13, 2007; 3. "Your Guardian Angel" Released: August 7, 2007

Don't You Fake It is the debut studio album by the American rock band the Red Jumpsuit Apparatus. The title is taken from a line in the opening track, "In Fate's Hands". The album garnered mixed reviews from critics. Don't You Fake It debuted at number 25 on the Billboard 200 and spawned three singles: "Face Down", "False Pretense" and "Your Guardian Angel". To promote the record, the band toured across North America with appearances at music festivals.

== Recording ==
In January 2006, AbsolutePunk reported that the band was in the process of recording their first album.

== Release ==
On March 4, 2006, "Face Down" was posted on the Red Jumpsuit Apparatus' Myspace profile. A music video was released for the song three days later. In May 2006, they appeared at The Bamboozle festival. Don't You Fake It was made available for streaming via AOL on July 17, 2006, before being released a day later. They went on a headlining US tour in August and September 2006, where they were supported by Monty Are I, and then appeared at the Bamboozle Left festival. On January 26, 2007, the music video for "False Pretense" was posted online. In February and March 2007, the band headlined that year's Take Action Tour. "False Pretense" impacted radio on March 13, 2007. The album was re-released on March 20. Following this, they appeared at The Bamboozle festival. From late June to late August, the band went on the 2007 edition of Warped Tour. "Your Guardian Angel" was released to radio on August 7. In October and November, the band went on a US tour with Amber Pacific and New Years Day. In April 2008, the band went on an acoustic US tour, dubbed Unplugged and Unaffected. In early May, the band appeared at the 2008 edition of the Bamboozle festival.

=== Remaster ===
In 2014, the band released "Don't You Fake It (Alliance Edition)", a remaster of the album. The remaster, as told by the band, was specifically done for an iTunes release, but is also available on other platforms. The tracklisting is mostly identical to the original album, but swaps some tracks positions, removes "Damn Regret" and adds "Disconnected" from the Deluxe Edition as well as "The Grimm Goodbye" from certain releases of the original album.

== Music and lyrics ==
Don't You Fake It has been described as alternative rock "with occasional screamo tendencies." Corey Apar of AllMusic said the album "sounds nearly like what would result should Hawthorne Heights and Hoobastank have a love child." Further comparing the sound to Story of the Year, Jimmy Eat World, and The Used, he stated that it was "just abrasive enough for the Warped Tour stage." Lyrical themes explored on the album include romance and domestic violence.

== Reception ==
=== Critical response ===
Professional ratings
Review scores
Source	Rating
AllMusic	2.5/5 stars
Alternative Addiction	3.5/5 stars
IGN	6.6/10
RockLouder	2/5 stars

A writer for Alternative Addiction called the band's overall musicianship "a mouth-watering hybrid of the best traits associated with bands like Underoath, Story of the Year and The All-American Rejects", concluding that "TRJA may lack innovation, but push all the right buttons in terms of merging popular rock genres." Corey Apar from AllMusic praised the single "Face Down" as a highlight and commended both "Cat and Mouse" and "Your Guardian Angel" for breaking up the "steadfast urgency" throughout the album, but felt the overall sound was too reminiscent of contemporaries like Jimmy Eat World and the Used, concluding that "it's all not quite enough to wash out the generic taste left in one's mouth by the end. The band may not be faking anything, but even earnestness isn't always enough." IGN's Chad Grischow said that there was "more promise than substance on their debut", giving praise to Ronnie Winter's vocal performance and the tracks for containing "a powerful rock punch with hard-crashing guitar riffs and driving beats supporting solid emo hooks", but said that it "fits a little too comfortably among the hundreds of other pop-punk and emo releases of the summer. It is certainly not the worst of them, but it is hardly the best either." He concluded that "in the overcrowded state of the genre their debut fails to make a splash."

=== Commercial performance ===
The album debuted at number 25 on the Billboard 200 and moved 25,000 copies in its first week. By August 2006, the album had sold over 100,000 copies, and has sold 852,000 copies as of August 2008. It was eventually certified Platinum in May 2016. Ronnie Winter told Alternative Press that same year: "Sometimes, in the past, it seems like people feel we have this burden of outselling Don’t You Fake It, or we have this burden of trying to top ourselves. We’ve never tried to do that. [...] It doesn’t matter if it sold a million records or if it sold a thousand because when we came out, people stopped buying CDs the next year, anyway. I don’t think that we ever need to top our first album. I hope that it’s always regarded as our best album. If we ever accidentally do top it, I’ll say the same thing I’ve always said: Whoops, thanks, right on."

== Track listing ==
All lyrics are written by Ronnie Winter; all music is composed by The Red Jumpsuit Apparatus.

Don't You Fake It
No.	Title	Length
1.	"In Fate's Hands"	3:27
2.	"Waiting"	2:56
3.	"False Pretense"	2:27
4.	"Face Down"	3:10
5.	"Misery Loves Its Company"	3:14
6.	"Cat and Mouse"	3:27
7.	"Damn Regret"	2:44
8.	"Atrophy"	3:16
9.	"Seventeen Ain't So Sweet"	3:20
10.	"Justify"	3:26
11.	"Your Guardian Angel"	3:51
Total length:		35:18

Hidden track
No.	Title	Length
1.	"The Grimm Goodbye"	7:39

== Personnel ==
Credits adapted from the liner notes of Don't You Fake It.

The Red Jumpsuit Apparatus

- Ronnie Winter – lead vocals
- Duke Kitchens – guitar, piano, backing vocals
- Elias Reidy – guitar, backing vocals
- Joey Westwood – bass guitar, backing vocals
- Jon Wilkes – drums, backing vocals

Additional musicians

- Randy Winter – drum and electronic sequencing (1, 10)
- Dan Korneff – strings

Production

- David Bendeth – producer, mixing
- Dan Korneff – engineer, digital editing
- John Bender – additional engineering and digital editing
- Kato Khandwala – additional engineering and digital editing
- Anthony Fontana – assistant engineer
- Ted Young – assistant engineer
- Isaiah Abolin – assistant strings engineer
- Ted Jensen – mastering at Sterling Sound, NYC

Artwork

- Sean Mosher-Smith – creative direction
- Dzark Design Bureau – design
- Myriam Santos-Kayda – photography

== Charts ==
=== Weekly charts ===
Weekly chart performance for Don't You Fake It
Chart (2006–2007)	Peak position
New Zealand Albums (RMNZ)	23
US Billboard 200	25
US Top Rock Albums (Billboard)	8

=== Year-end charts ===
Year-end chart performance for Don't You Fake It
Chart (2007)	Position
US Billboard 200	93
US Top Rock Albums (Billboard)	25

== Certifications ==
Certifications for Don't You Fake It
Region	Certification	Certified units/sales
United States (RIAA)	Platinum	1,000,000^{‡}
^{‡} Sales+streaming figures based on certification alone.
