= The Red Jumpsuit Apparatus =

American rock band

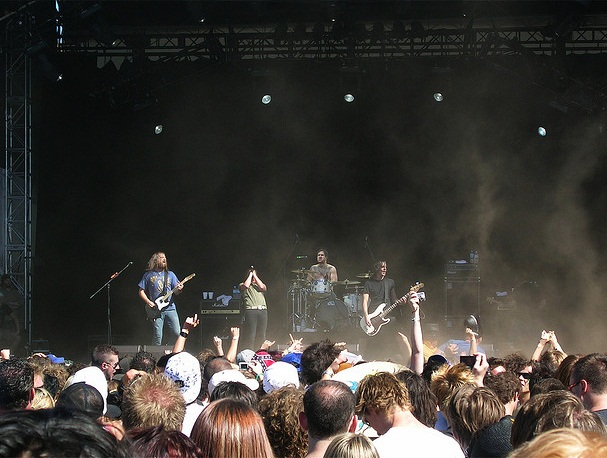
- The Red Jumpsuit Apparatus performing at the 2009 Soundwave Festival

Background information
- Origin: Middleburg, Florida, U.S.
- Genres: Alternative rock; pop-punk; post-hardcore; emo
- Years active: 2003–present
- Labels: Virgin; EMI; Better Noise
- Members: Ronnie Winter; Joey Westwood; Randy Winter; Josh Burke; John Espy; Nadeem Salam; K Enagonio
- Past members: Dan Wagler; Thomas Wurth; Thomas Amason; Elias Reidy; Duke Kitchens; Jon Wilkes; Matt Carter; Matt Fallows; John Hartman; Daniel Resnick
- Website: theredjumpsuitapparatus.com

The Red Jumpsuit Apparatus is an American rock band formed in Middleburg, Florida, in 2003. The band's current members include Ronnie Winter (lead vocals), K Enagonio (unclean vocals), Joey Westwood (bass), Josh Burke (lead guitar), Randy Winter (rhythm guitar), John Espy (drums, percussion), and Nadeem Salam (keyboards). They have released six studio albums to date.

The band is best known for their 2006 major-label debut Don't You Fake It. Its lead single "Face Down" became their biggest success, and "False Pretense" and "Your Guardian Angel" were successful follow-up hits. Don't You Fake It is the band's only RIAA-certified album (Platinum), and all of its singles have also received awards from various institutions.

== History ==
=== 2003–2004: early years ===
Originating in Florida, childhood friends Ronnie Winter and Duke Kitchens started the band while attending an AP Music Theory class in 2001. The Red Jumpsuit Apparatus was officially formed in 2003 after the addition of other members who were then in other bands. The band name was chosen by the band voting for random words they threw on a wall. The original drummer and bassist left the band before having playing one show to join the military and to attend college, respectively. Winter took over on drums afterward. He eventually switched to vocals only because he could not stop running out of breath and passing out on the drum set.

The Red Jumpsuit Apparatus worked with Vision Sound studios in Orange Park, Florida, which released a "6 song EP CD that was spread throughout different countries to promote the band in 2005". The band began to become more popular as they used certain social media, namely Myspace, to advertise their music. While popular in their local scene, the band found it difficult to secure label support. This is why the band took 18 months to write songs before going into the live scene. They built a fan base with continued live shows, which attracted the attention of Jason Flom of Virgin Records in 2005, after which they began work on their first album.

=== 2005–2007: Don't You Fake It ===
In 2006, they released their first LP, Don't You Fake It, with the singles "Face Down," "False Pretense", "Your Guardian Angel", and "Damn Regret".

The album was certified gold on November 27, 2006, by the RIAA for sales shipments exceeding 500,000 copies.

In February 2007, The Red Jumpsuit Apparatus headlined the US Take Action Tour organized for the prevention of youth suicide, along with bands such as My Chemical Romance and Rise Against.

Their song "In Fate's Hands" is featured in the video game Madden NFL 07; their song "Face Down" is featured in the video games Saints Row 2 and MX vs. ATV: Untamed; and their song "False Pretense" is featured in the movie Never Back Down.

From 2006 to 2008, the band performed several headliner and supporting shows with bands like Thirty Seconds to Mars, Madina Lake, The Audition, Saosin, Scary Kids Scaring Kids, Taking Back Sunday, Lorene Drive, The Used, Monty Are I, Amber Pacific, Boys Like Girls, Halifax, Emery, A Static Lullaby, and So They Say.

The Red Jumpsuit Apparatus Don't You Fake It Deluxe Edition (CD/DVD) was released on March 20, 2007. The CD features the album and two exclusive songs, an acoustic version of "Face Down", and a never released out of Australia bonus track, "Disconnected".

On May 3, 2007, The Red Jumpsuit Apparatus performed at Fort Rucker, Alabama, to help benefit the rebuilding of Enterprise High School after it was destroyed by a tornado on March 1, 2007.

In May 2007, the single "Face Down" was featured in the movie Georgia Rule. The song was also used in Madden NFL 07 as well as the 2007 EVER OSL Starleague (Ongamenet). Additional songs used during that OSL season were "Waiting" and "Atrophy".

In a 2007 interview with the Florida Entertainment Scene, The Red Jumpsuit Apparatus teamed up with Virgin Records to raise funds for the National Coalition Against Domestic Violence. They also headlined the Take Action! Tour, which sponsors awareness against teen suicide, animal cruelty, and domestic violence.

The band appeared in Episode 8, Season 3 of the Hills "For Better or Worse", where they undertook a photoshoot for Teen Vogue.

=== 2008–2009: Lonely Road ===
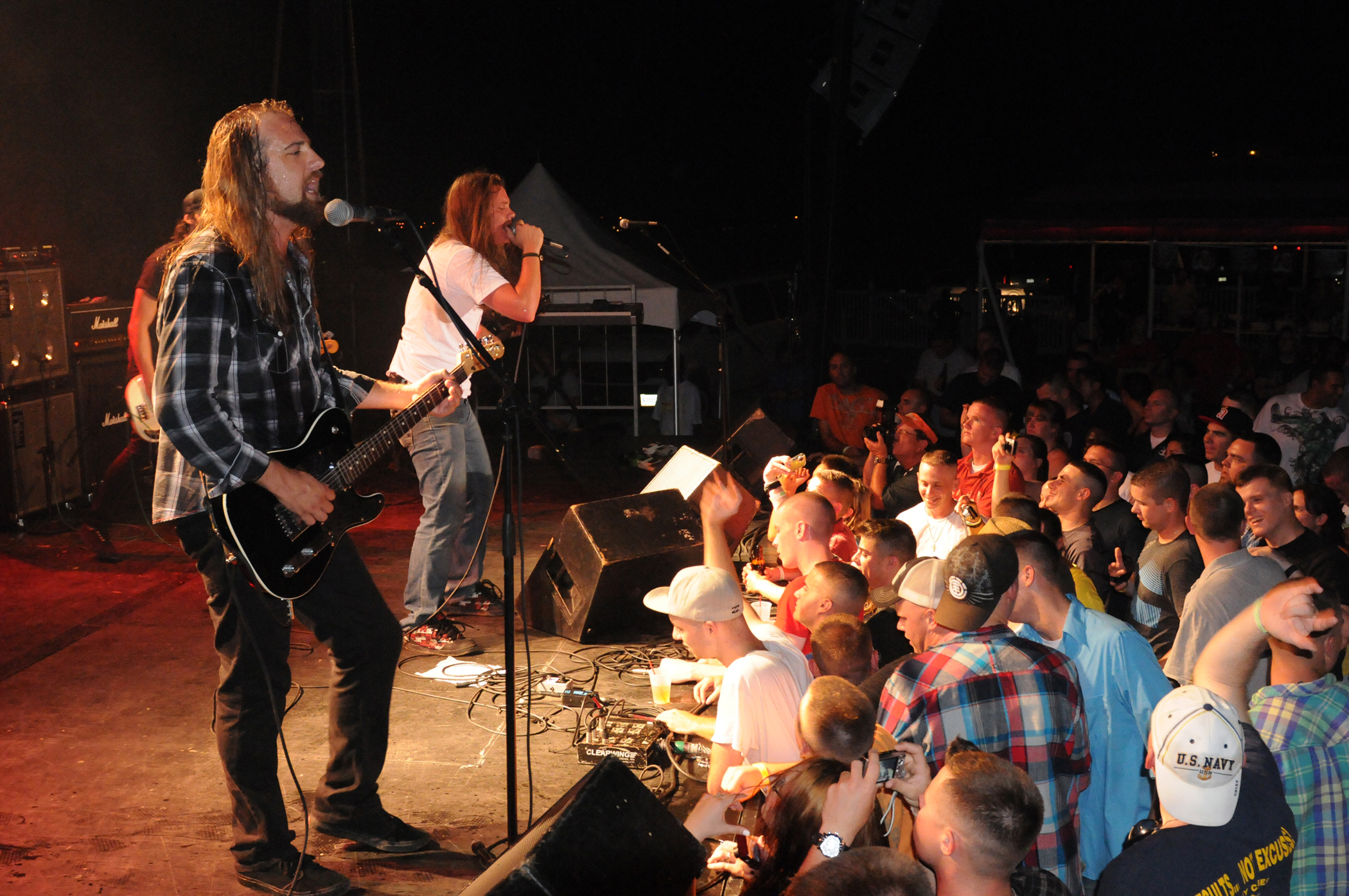
The Red Jumpsuit Apparatus performing a Memorial Day weekend concert for U.S. military service members at Guantanamo Bay

In June 2007, according to Billboard.com, The Red Jumpsuit Apparatus began to work on their second album, Lonely Road, that had a tentative release date of summer 2008. The band was then pulled out of their confirmed appearances at the Australian Soundwave festival tour 2008, after their label president promised to pay money that was owed and have the band in the studio, but instead did not pull through.

In April 2008, the band began an acoustic tour on the east coast in various locations with the group Amaru, who is from the same home town. Ronnie said that the tour felt like they were "Getting back where we all started."

After pulling out of the 2008 Soundwave festival, the band took part in the line-up for 2009.

On September 30, 2008, the band announced in a Myspace blog post that on October 3 they would be premiering a demo version of a song from the upcoming album. The song was available a day earlier for members of The Red Jumpsuit Apparatus "Alliance" fan group. However, the studio of the song "Pen and Paper" was released to members of the fan group on October 9, and was released on the band's Myspace the following day. Another song, "You Better Pray", the first single from Lonely Road, was premiered worldwide on PlanetRadio1073.com for free listening beginning on October 21 and began streaming the next day on the band's Myspace page.

Their second studio album, titled Lonely Road, was released on February 3, debuting in the fourteenth spot on the Billboard 200, and was produced by Howard Benson (My Chemical Romance, Daughtry, Less Than Jake, Hoobastank, P.O.D., The All-American Rejects, Seether, and Cold).

Beginning in October 2008, Matt Carter had replaced former guitar player Elias Reidy. Carter had worked as a tech for the band in the winter and spring of 2008, and had jammed with the band a few years previously. Now, Carter was asked to take Reidy's spot, and he agreed to play with The Red Jumpsuit Apparatus. In an interview with a Jacksonville newspaper, Ronnie was asked whether Carter was officially in the band, to which he responded, "I don't know. I guess he's in the band. We're taking it slow." Carter played with the band from then on.

In support of this album, the band went on many tours in the winter of 2008 and the spring of 2009 with bands such as Shinedown, Framing Hanley, and Tickle Me Pink.

On March 20, 2009, The Red Jumpsuit Apparatus released an EP titled Shock Session, featuring acoustic versions of "Pen & Paper", "You Better Pray", and "Face Down".

At the end of May 2009, they announced along with Hollywood Undead, Mest, and The Sleeping that they would be doing a summer tour for the months of June and July, playing mostly club and small venue shows. They rejoined Monty Are I for an August 2009 tour throughout Canada and California.

=== 2010–2012: The Hell or High Water EP and Am I the Enemy ===
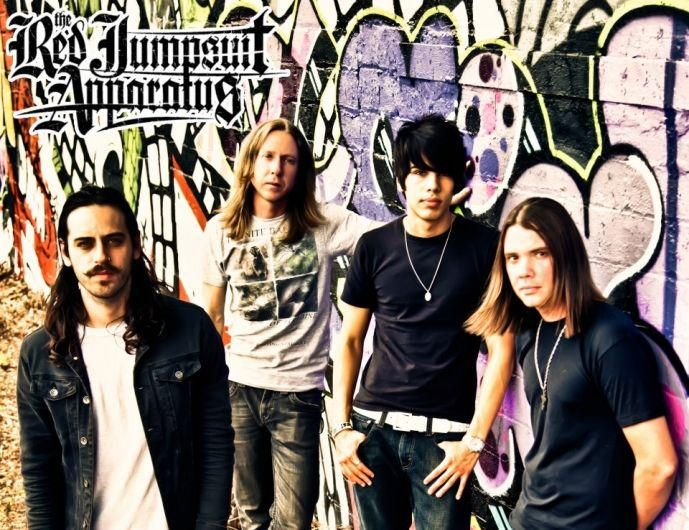
The band in 2012

On January 29, 2010, The Red Jumpsuit Apparatus announced via their Twitter page that they would have a new EP out in late July/August.

In February 2010, the band parted ways with their label Virgin Records, citing the poor promotion of Lonely Road. They decided to release music independently. According to lead singer Ronnie Winter, "At this point we want to stay completely 100% independent for as long as possible." The first such song was "Valentine," which was released for free on Valentine's Day, February 14, 2010.

On June 22, 2010, The Red Jumpsuit Apparatus announced via Myspace blog that their upcoming EP release would be titled The Hell or High Water, and that the first song from it, "Choke", would be released on June 28, 2010, as a free download. The EP was recorded in the band's studio in Middleburg, Florida, and was mixed and mastered by Paul Lapinski. This was their first release following their departure from Virgin Records, and was released on August 24, 2010. The full-length album following the EP was scheduled to be out in early 2011.

The music video for the first single from the EP, "Choke", premiered at purevolume.com on August 25, 2010, in support of the EP's release. It was the first of a three-part series, followed by "Don't Hate" and "Hell or High Water". It shows characters killing record executive-type personnel, running from the police, and then dying in the final video. Its moral was "violence never solves anything".

In November 2010, The Red Jumpsuit Apparatus entered the studio to record their third full-length album, Am I the Enemy, finishing in December 2010 with producer John Feldmann. The album's first single, "Reap", was released via YouTube on March 24, although the song itself was not released to iTunes until April 26. The Red Jumpsuit Apparatus later released two other songs from their new album on their YouTube channel, "Salvation" and "Fall from Grace". A June 7 announcement on the band's Facebook page said the new album, Am I the Enemy, would be released on August 30, 2011. It was to contain twelve songs.

On July 11, 2011, lead singer Ronnie Winter announced that guitarists Duke Kitchens and Matt Carter had left the band "to focus on their personal lives", and longtime Red Jumpsuit Apparatus fan Josh Burke joined as lead guitarist. This was followed by a YouTube video on July 17 welcoming Burke as the official lead guitarist of the band, replacing Carter. Ronnie's brother, Randy Winter, was later added as the second guitarist, filling in for Duke Kitchens.

In mid-October, drummer Jon Wilkes decided to depart from the band in order to "pursue new things and make a living" as a producer. According to Wilkes, he left the band on good terms and wished them the best in their future endeavors. He was temporarily replaced by Kristopher Comeaux while the band was touring, but Comeaux departed shortly after.

=== 2013–2019: Et Tu, Brute? EP, 4, and The Awakening ===
On March 15, 2013, the band released an EP titled Et Tu, Brute?. The EP was produced by David Bendeth (producer of Don't You Fake It). Prior to its release, the band released two of the songs on their page.

On October 11, 2013, the band revealed their fourth studio album, titled 4, was 'coming soon' via their Facebook page. They also revealed that David Bendeth would be producing the LP. Three days later, again through Facebook, the band announced Matt Carter was returning to the band and would be playing lead guitar for 4. On January 1, 2014, the band announced that 4, as well as the rest of their discography, would be released July 4, 2014.

This band planned to perform their first rock show in India at the 2016 edition of Saarang, the cultural fest of IIT Madras, on January 9, 2016. In a November 27 post on their official Instagram page, RJA announced their anniversary tour dates. They were one of the first official bands announced for 2017's Rock on the Range in Columbus, Ohio.

In an April 2017 interview, Winter said that after their anniversary tour, the band would head to the studio in southern California to record The Awakening. It would be co-produced by him and his wife, and was to be released in the same year. However, according to coverage by Alternative Press of a post and comments on the band's Facebook page in July 2017, the new record would be released in 2018, along with a new single and tour in the fall of 2017. It was released on March 30, 2018.

In September 2018 an Australian tour was announced to be taking place in December of the same year featuring support from Australian band The Comfort. In December 2018, the band surprised dropped a new song entitled "Land Down Under" which later was confirmed to be a cover song by Men At Work.

=== 2020–present: The Emergency EP and X's for Eyes ===
On August 28, 2020, the band released The Emergency EP containing two previously released singles from 2020, "Brace Yourself" and "A Long Time Ago in a Galaxy Called LA" along with four new tracks.

Winter stated that the COVID-19 pandemic and subsequent lockdowns were the first time in the band's career that they had been off the road.

In June 2025, the band participated in the 2025 Vans Warped Tour and released the lead single off of their then-upcoming sixth studio album X's for Eyes titled "Slipping Through (No Kings)".

On July 8, 2025, the Red Jumpsuit Apparatus welcomed K Enagonio of Chasing Satellites as their new full-time unclean vocalist. Prior to their inclusion in the band, Ronnie Winter originally performed both clean and unclean vocals until 2014 when his brother Randy took over screaming vocals following Ronnie's vocal rehab.

The band was confirmed to be performing at the 2026 Sonic Temple music festival in Columbus, Ohio.

== Musical style and influences ==
The Red Jumpsuit Apparatus has been described as alternative rock, pop-punk, emo, post-hardcore, screamo, and emo pop. Kerrang! categorized them as a "MySpace band". Frontman Ronnie Winter said: "The fundamental foundation behind the band was we wanted to be more edgy than your average pop-punk band, but less hardcore than your average hardcore band. We somehow wanted to sit in the middle of those two. And I think we accomplished that." He told Nylon that he used to say he wanted the band's albums to "sound like it's on shuffle but with the same singer."

Winter is the band's chief songwriter, and he has stated that most of the band's songs are true stories. The band's lyrics have spiritual undertones, though they are not an explicitly Christian band. Winter said of the band's message: "We try to just walk the line; we are spiritual in nature, but at the same time, we accept all walks of life. When you're in a band, the first thing you realize when you go on tours is how many different kinds of people listen to your music—it's really wild. So we accept everybody." Additionally, he explained to Nylon: "It's a hard, fine line between coming off too preachy and just sounding honest. I was very adamant about telling people we believe, but that we're normal and don't think we're better than everybody else. I've met a lot of people who have been burned that way. Unfortunately, hardcore Christians don't realize that they do more damage than good. The 'holier than thou' attitude just doesn't work anymore in today's society."

Winter has cited NOFX and Strung Out as personal influences from his teenage years. Other influences the band have cited include Underoath, Anberlin, My Chemical Romance, the Used, Taking Back Sunday, Saves the Day, Green Day, the Cure, the Smashing Pumpkins, the Beatles, Thrice, Pennywise, Bad Religion, No Use For A Name, Lagwagon and MxPx.

== Band members ==
Current

- Ronnie Winter – clean vocals, acoustic guitar (2003–present), unclean vocals (2003–2014), keyboards (2003–2019)
- Joey Westwood – bass (2005–present)
- Josh Burke – lead guitar, backing vocals (2011–2013, 2015–present)
- Randy Winter – rhythm guitar (2011–present; touring 2003–2011), backing vocals (2011–2014, 2025–present; touring 2003–2011), unclean vocals (2014–2025)
- John Espy – drums (2015–present)
- Nadeem Salam – keyboards (2022–present)
- K Enagonio – unclean vocals, hyping (2025–present)

Former

- Thomas Wurth – bass (2003–2005)
- Dan Wagler – drums (2003–2005)
- Duke Kitchens – rhythm guitar, backing vocals (2003–2011)
- Thomas Amason – lead guitar, backing vocals (2003–2005)
- Elias Reidy – lead guitar, backing vocals (2005–2008)
- Matt Carter – lead guitar (2008–2011, 2013–2015)
- Jon Wilkes – drums (2005–2011)
- Matt Fallows – Guitar (2011)
- John Hartman – drums (2012–2015)
- Daniel Resnick – keyboards (2019–2022)

Touring

- Kris Comeaux – drums (2011–2012)

== Discography ==
- Don't You Fake It (2006)
- Lonely Road (2009)
- Am I the Enemy (2011)
- 4 (2014)
- The Awakening (2018)
- X's for Eyes (2025)
