= You Better Pray =

2008 song by The Red Jumpsuit Apparatus

"You Better Pray" is a song by American rock band The Red Jumpsuit Apparatus. The song is also available as a downloadable track on the iPhone application Tap Tap Revenge 2. It is a playable track on the Nintendo DS version of Band Hero.

== Charts ==
Chart (2008)	Peak position
Billboard Modern Rock Tracks	17
Billboard Mainstream Rock Tracks	31
