= 2017 FC Vorkuta season =

FC Vorkuta
2017 season
- Owners: Igor Demitchev; Samad Kadirov
- Head Coach: Serhiy Zayets
- Canadian Soccer League: 1st place, (First Division)
- CSL Championship: Semifinal
- Top goalscorer: Sergiy Ivliev (13 goals)

The 2017 FC Vorkuta season was the first season in the club's participation in the Canadian Soccer League. The club made its professional debut on May 27, 2017 in a home match against Milton SC, which resulted in a 7-0 victory with goals coming from Oleh Kerchu, Danylo Lazar, Oleg Shutov, Vadym Gostiev, and Yaroslav Svorak. The season concluded with Vorkuta clinching the regular season title in their debut season. In the postseason they achieved a victory in the preliminary round, but were eliminated from the competition in the semifinals.

== Summary ==
After nine years of competition at the senior amateur level FC Vorkuta made the transition to the professional ranks in 2017 by becoming a member in the Canadian Soccer League. In preparation for the 2017 CSL season the team hired the services of Serhiy Zayets as head coach. Zayets assembled a roster with several key CSL veterans acquired primarily from FC Ukraine United. The acquisitions included Sergiy Ivliev, Oleg Shutov, Mykhailo Bulkin, Vitaliy Dnistryan, Danylo Lazar, Vadym Gostiev, and Oleh Kerchu was named the team captain. In addition to the CSL veterans several imports were brought in from Ukraine and Russia to further strengthen the roster.

Vorkuta also fielded a reserve squad in the CSL Second Division. In the earlier stages of the season the club achieved an eight-game undefeated streak with only two defeats throughout the season. They concluded the season by clinching the regular season title with the highest offensive record. Their playoff campaign commenced with an early victory over Royal Toronto FC, but were eliminated from the competition after a 1-0 defeat to Scarborough SC.

== Roster ==
=== Players ===
As of June 29, 2017

Note: Flags indicate national team as defined under FIFA eligibility rules; some limited exceptions apply. Players may hold more than one non-FIFA nationality.

No.	Pos.	Nation	Player
–	MF	UKR	Bogdan Bortnik
–	MF	UKR	Mykhailo Bulkin
–	MF	CAN	Artur Chernov
–	MF	UKR	Denis Dyachenko
–	MF	UKR	Vitaliy Dnistryan
–	DF	UKR	Vadym Gostiev
–	MF	UKR	Maksym Hramm
–	MF	UKR	Valerii Haidarzhi
–	DF	UKR	Lyubomyr Halchuk
–	FW	UKR	Sergiy Ivliev
-	DF	UKR	Oleh Kerchu (captain)
-	FW	CAN	Kristijan Kezic
–	GK	UKR	Hryhoriy Krasovsky
–	FW	UKR	Oleksandr Lakusta
–	DF	UKR	Danylo Lazar
–	DF	UKR	Andriy Lemishevsky
–	GK	UKR	Oleksandr Musiyenko

No.	Pos.	Nation	Player
–	MF	UKR	Dimitri Pachkoria
–	MF	UKR	Serhiy Patula
–	DF	UKR	Volodymyr Pidvirnyi
–	FW	UKR	Viktor Raskov
–	MF	UKR	Mykhailo Riabyi
–	DF	UKR	Vitaliy Rudyi
–	DF	UKR	Volodymyr Rudyi
–	GK	UKR	Sergiy Semyon
–	MF	UKR	Oleg Shutov
–	MF	UKR	Yaroslav Solonynko
–	MF	UKR	Yuri Stepaniuk
–	MF	UKR	Yaroslav Svorak
–	MF	UKR	Oleksandr Tymchyshyn
–	DF	UKR	Oleksandr Volchkov
–	MF	UKR	Ivan Yanchev
–	MF	UKR	Denys Yanchuk
–	MF	UKR	Valery Yarmosh
–	GK	UKR	Ruslan Zarubin

== Canadian Soccer League ==
=== First Division ===
==== League table ====
First Division
Pos	Team	Pld	W	D	L	GF	GA	GD	Pts	Qualification
1	FC Vorkuta (C)	14	10	2	2	43	13	+30	32	Playoffs
2	Serbian White Eagles	14	9	4	1	38	14	+24	31	Playoffs
3	York Region Shooters (O)	14	9	3	2	34	7	+27	30	Playoffs
4	Scarborough SC	14	7	3	4	37	17	+20	24	Playoffs
5	Brantford Galaxy	14	6	0	8	26	37	−11	18	Playoffs
6	Milton SC	14	2	2	10	24	75	−51	8	Playoffs
7	SC Waterloo Region	14	1	5	8	19	33	−14	8	Playoffs
8	Royal Toronto FC	14	1	3	10	20	45	−25	6	Playoffs

Updated to match(es) played on September 11, 2017. Source: []
Rules for classification: 1) points; 2) goal difference; 3) number of goals scored.
(C) Champions; (O) Play-off winners

==== Results summary ====
Overall								Home						Away					
Pld	W	D	L	GF	GA	GD	Pts	W	D	L	GF	GA	GD	W	D	L	GF	GA	GD
14	10	2	2	43	13	+30	32	5	0	2	21	7	+14	5	2	0	22	6	+16

Last updated: September 10, 2017.
Source: CSL

==== Results by round ====
Round	1	2	3	4	5	6	7	8	9	10	11	12	13	14
Ground	H	A	A	H	A	A	H	A	H	H	A	A	A	H
Result	W	D	D	W	W	W	W	W	L	W	W	W	W	L

Updated to match(es) played on September 10, 2017. Source: CSL
A = Away; H = Home; W = Win; D = Draw; L = Loss

==== Matches ====
May 27	FC Vorkuta	7–0	Milton SC	Toronto, Ontario
	Kerchu 9', 89'; Lazar 16'; Shutov 36', 39'; Gostiev 52'; Svorak 82'	Report		Stadium: Esther Shiner Stadium

June 4	SC Waterloo	2–2	FC Vorkuta	Waterloo, Ontario
	Drazen Vukovic; Zelenbaba	Report	Pidvirnyi,	Stadium: Warrior Field

June 9	Serbian White Eagles	1–1	FC Vorkuta	Toronto, Ontario
	Jočić 75'	Report	Stepaniuk 93'	Stadium: Centennial Park Stadium; Attendance: 100; Referee: Marco Jaramillo

June 17	FC Vorkuta	5–1	Royal Toronto FC	Toronto, Ontario
	Ivliev 10', 13', 16', 82'; Gostiev 86'	Report	Jerry Gbodume 81'	Stadium: Esther Shiner Stadium

June 23	York Region Shooters	1–2	FC Vorkuta	Vaughan, Ontario
	Reid 25'	Report	Volodymyr Rudyi 30'; Kristijan Kezic 84'	Stadium: St. Joan Of Arc Turf Field

July 1	Scarborough SC	0–1	FC Vorkuta	Toronto, Ontario
		Report	Ivliev 13'	Stadium: Birchmount Stadium

July 22	FC Vorkuta	2–1	SC Waterloo	Toronto, Ontario
	Kerchu; Solonynko	Report	Jure Glavina	Stadium: Esther Shiner Stadium

July 30	FC Vorkuta	4–0	Brantford Galaxy	Toronto, Ontario
	Ivliev, Svorak; Diachenko	Report		Stadium: Esther Shiner Stadium

August 5	FC Vorkuta	0–2	York Region Shooters	Toronto, Ontario
		Report	Hassan Abdulmumini 77'; Doryan Botelho 85'	Stadium: Esther Shiner Stadium

August 19	FC Vorkuta	1–0	Scarborough SC	Toronto, Ontario
	Diachenko 65'	Report		Stadium: Esther Shiner Stadium

August 23	Royal Toronto FC	0–2	FC Vorkuta	Vaughan, Ontario
		Report	Ivliev 61'; Svorak 68'	Stadium: Ontario Soccer Centre; Referee: Joshua Jaramilo

August 26	Brantford Galaxy	2–7	FC Vorkuta	Brantford, Ontario
		Report	Ivliev, Svorak,	Stadium: Steve Brown Sports Complex

August 30	Milton SC	0–7	FC Vorkuta	Milton, Ontario
		Report	Ivliev, Solonynko, Volodymyr Rudyi; Kerchu; Diachenko	Stadium: Jean Vanier Stadium

September 2	FC Vorkuta	2–3	Serbian White Eagles	Toronto, Ontario
		Report	Milan Kušić; Pešić,	Stadium: Esther Shiner Stadium

=== Second Division ===
==== League table ====
Second Division
Pos	Team	Pld	W	D	L	GF	GA	GD	Pts	Qualification
1	FC Ukraine United (C, O)	14	13	1	0	75	10	+65	40	Playoffs
2	Burlington SC	14	10	1	3	44	18	+26	31	Playoffs
3	FC Vorkuta B	14	8	0	6	41	25	+16	24	Playoffs
4	Brantford Galaxy B	14	7	1	6	29	35	−6	22	Playoffs
5	Serbian White Eagles B	14	6	0	8	32	59	−27	18	Playoffs
6	SC Waterloo B	14	5	1	8	26	39	−13	16	Playoffs
7	Royal Toronto B	14	5	0	9	32	58	−26	15	Playoffs
8	London City SC	14	0	0	14	11	46	−35	0	

Updated to match(es) played on September 7, 2017. Source: canadiansoccerleague.ca
Rules for classification: 1) points; 2) goal difference; 3) number of goals scored.
(C) Champions; (O) Play-off winners

==== Results summary ====
Overall								Home						Away					
Pld	W	D	L	GF	GA	GD	Pts	W	D	L	GF	GA	GD	W	D	L	GF	GA	GD
14	8	0	6	41	25	+16	24	4	0	3	26	13	+13	4	0	3	15	12	+3

Last updated: September 10, 2017.
Source: CSL

==== Results by round ====
Round	1	2	3	4	5	6	7	8	9	10	11	12	13	14
Ground	A	A	A	H	H	H	H	H	H	A	A	A	A	H
Result	L	W	W	W	L	W	L	W	W	W	W	L	L	L

Updated to match(es) played on September 10, 2017. Source: CSL
A = Away; H = Home; W = Win; D = Draw; L = Loss

== Statistics ==
=== Goals and assists ===
Correct as of November 2, 2017

First Division Goals
Pos.	Playing Pos.	Nation	Name	Appearances	Goals
1	FW	(Ukraine)	Sergiy Ivliev	13	13
2	MF	(Ukraine)	Oleg Shutov	13	5
3	MF	(Ukraine)	Yaroslav Svorak	11	4
4	MF	(Ukraine)	Oleh Kerchu	12	3
4	MF	(Ukraine)	Yaroslav Solonynko	13	3
5	DF	(Ukraine)	Vadym Gostiev	13	2
5	DF	(Ukraine)	Volodymyr Pidvirnyi	9	2
5	DF	(Ukraine)	Volodymyr Rudyi	9	2
8	MF	(Ukraine)	Bogdan Bortnik	2	1
8	MF	(Ukraine)	Denis Dyachenko	13	1
8	MF	(Ukraine)	Valerii Haidarzhi	13	1
8	FW	(Canada)	Kristijan Kezic	9	1
8	FW	(Ukraine)	Oleksandr Lakusta	5	1
8	DF	(Ukraine)	Danylo Lazar	10	1
8	MF	(Ukraine)	Mykhailo Riabyi	5	1
8	DF	(Ukraine)	Yuri Stepaniuk	11	1
Total				161	43

Second Division Goals
Pos.	Playing Pos.	Nation	Name	Appearances	Goals	
1	FW	(Ukraine)	Oleksandr Lakusta	6	4	
2	MF	(Ukraine)	Vitaliy Dnistryan	6	3	
2	DF	(Ukraine)	Vadym Gostiev	4	3	
2	MF	(Ukraine)	Yaroslav Solonynko	3	3	
5	MF	(Ukraine)	Maksym Hramm	8	2	
5	MF	(Canada)	Kristijan Kezic	5	2	
5	FW	(Ukraine)	Yaroslav Svorak	7	2	
5	MF	(Ukraine)	Valery Yarmosh	6	2	
8	MF	(Ukraine)	Bogdan Bortnik	7	1	
8	MF	(Ukraine)	Denis Dyachenko	3	1	
8	MF	(Ukraine)	Valerii Haidarzhi	3	1	
8	FW	(Ukraine)	Sergiy Ivliev	2	1	
8	DF	(Ukraine)	Danylo Lazar	4	1	
8	DF	(Ukraine)	Andriy Lemishevsky	8	1	
8	FW	(Ukraine)	Viktor Raskov	5	1	
8	MF	(Ukraine)	Oleg Shutov	2	1	
8	DF	(Ukraine)	Oleksandr Volchkov	4	1	
8	MF	(Ukraine)	Denys Yanchuk	4	1	
8	Total				94	31
