= 2017 Serbian White Eagles FC season =

Serbian White Eagles FC
2017 season
- President: Dragan Bakoč
- Head Coach: Uroš Stamatović; Milan Mijailović
- CSL: Semifinals
- Top goalscorer: Đorđe Jocić (7 goals)
Home colours	Away colours

The 2017 Serbian White Eagles FC season was the twenty first season in the club's participation in the Canadian Soccer League (including Canadian National Soccer League days).They began the season on May 26, 2017 at home against SC Waterloo Region. Throughout the season they maintained their traditional status of an elite club by finishing the season as runners up in the regular season. They only recorded one defeat and achieved the second best offensive record. In the postseason they failed to successfully defend their CSL Championship after losing to York Region Shooters in the semifinals.

== Summary ==
The White Eagles entered the 2017 CSL season as the defending champions with Uroš Stamatović returning to manage the squad for the season. Serbia continued its strategy of recruiting seasoned imports from Europe, while also rejuvenating the roster with younger graduates from their youth system. The new additions included Luka Milidragović, Dušan Kovačević, and Ivan Nikolic. They also continued fielding their reserve team in the Second Division.

While their on field performance continued to prosper as the White Eagles began the season with a 12-game undefeated streak. Their only defeat occurred in an away match, while at home they remained undefeated. Serbia concluded the regular season as runners up and was ranked in the top three for the best offensive and defensive records. In the preliminary round of the postseason they defeated SC Waterloo by a score of 5-3. Unfortunately they failed to defend the CSL Championship after being eliminated by the York Region Shooters.

== Players ==
=== Roster ===
As of June 29, 2017

Note: Flags indicate national team as defined under FIFA eligibility rules; some limited exceptions apply. Players may hold more than one non-FIFA nationality.

No.	Pos.	Nation	Player
–	FW	MNE	Luka Bojić
–	DF	SRB	Vitomir Jelić
–	MF	SRB	Đorđe Jocić
–	MF	SRB	Miroslav Jovanović
–	DF	SRB	Radenko Kamberović
–	MF	CAN	Dusan Kovacevic
–	DF	SRB	Milan Kušić
–	MF	SRB	Miloš Ljubenović
–	MF	SRB	Marko Marović
–	DF	CAN	Luka Milidragovic
-	DF	CAN	Bojan Nedeljkovic

No.	Pos.	Nation	Player
-	FW	CAN	Ivan Nikolic
–	DF	SRB	Zoran Pešić
–	MF	CAN	Milos Rudan
–	FW	CAN	Milos Scepanovic
–	GK	SRB	Goran Škarić
–	MF	SRB	Ivan Stanković
–	MF	MNE	Đorđije Strunjaš
–	DF	SRB	Goran Švonja
–	MF	CAN	Filip Velasevic
–	GK	SRB	Bojan Vranić
–	DF	SRB	Branislav Vukomanović

=== Management ===
Position	Staff
Head coach	Uros Stamatović
Fitness coach	Vesna Altarac
President	Dragan Bakoc

Last updated: December 5, 2017
Source: serbianwhiteeagles.ca

== Competitions ==
=== Canadian Soccer League ===
==== League table ====
===== First Division =====
Pos	Team	Pld	W	D	L	GF	GA	GD	Pts	Qualification
1	FC Vorkuta (C)	14	10	2	2	43	13	+30	32	Playoffs
2	Serbian White Eagles	14	9	4	1	38	14	+24	31	Playoffs
3	York Region Shooters (O)	14	9	3	2	34	7	+27	30	Playoffs
4	Scarborough SC	14	7	3	4	37	17	+20	24	Playoffs
5	Brantford Galaxy	14	6	0	8	26	37	−11	18	Playoffs
6	Milton SC	14	2	2	10	24	75	−51	8	Playoffs
7	SC Waterloo Region	14	1	5	8	19	33	−14	8	Playoffs
8	Royal Toronto FC	14	1	3	10	20	45	−25	6	Playoffs

Updated to match(es) played on September 11, 2017. Source: []
Rules for classification: 1) points; 2) goal difference; 3) number of goals scored.
(C) Champions; (O) Play-off winners

==== Results summary ====
Overall								Home						Away					
Pld	W	D	L	GF	GA	GD	Pts	W	D	L	GF	GA	GD	W	D	L	GF	GA	GD
14	9	4	1	38	14	+24	31	4	3	0	17	5	+12	5	1	1	21	9	+12

Last updated: September 10, 2017.
Source: CSL

==== Results by round ====
Round	1	2	3	4	5	6	7	8	9	10	11	12	13	14
Ground	H	H	H	A	H	A	H	A	A	A	H	H	A	A
Result	D	W	D	W	W	W	W	D	W	W	D	W	L	W

Updated to match(es) played on September 10, 2017. Source: CSL
A = Away; H = Home; W = Win; D = Draw; L = Loss

==== Matches ====
May 26	Serbian White Eagles	1–1	SC Waterloo	Toronto, Ontario
	Jocić 65'	Report	Adis Hasecic 50'	Stadium: Centennial Park Stadium; Attendance: 150; Referee: Vee Venne

June 2	Serbian White Eagles	2–1	Scarborough SC	Toronto, Ontario
	Pešić 31'; Jocić 74'	Report	Dimitrov 24'	Stadium: Centennial Park Stadium; Attendance: 100; Referee: Ramee Arbaji

June 9	Serbian White Eagles	1–1	FC Vorkuta	Toronto, Ontario
	Jocić 74'	Report	Stepaniuk 93'	Stadium: Centennial Park Stadium; Attendance: 100; Referee: Marco Jaramillo

June 17	Brantford Galaxy	1–6	Serbian White Eagles	Brantford, Ontario
	Vukovic 86'	Report	Filip Velasevic 13'; Pešić 60'; Jocić 66', 73'; Miroslav Jovanović 85', 89'	Stadium: Steve Brown Sports Complex; Referee: Tony Amaral

June 23	Serbian White Eagles	3–1	Royal Toronto FC	Toronto, Ontario
	Švonja 43'; Luka Bojić 74'; Dusan Kovačević 77'	Report	Dario Brezak 9'	Stadium: Centennial Park Stadium; Attendance: 100; Referee: Ramee Arbaji

July 2	Milton SC	3–4	Serbian White Eagles	Milton, Ontario
	Leandro Aguilar 23'; Lucky Maghori 26', 51'	Report	Vukasin Lukic 10', 14'; Jocić 30'; Miroslav Jovanović 45'	Stadium: Milton Community Park; Referee: Garfield

July 7	Serbian White Eagles	2–0	Brantford Galaxy	Toronto, Ontario
	Dusan Kovačević 81'; Švonja 86'	Report		Stadium: Centennial Park Stadium; Attendance: 100; Referee: Javier Prior

July 14	SC Waterloo	1–1	Serbian White Eagles	Waterloo, Ontario
	Jure Glavina 37'	Report	Dusan Kovačević 30'	Stadium: Warrior Field; Attendance: 100; Referee: Tony Amaral

July 28	Scarborough SC	1–2	Serbian White Eagles	Toronto, Ontario
	Stefan Stoiljkovic 55'	Report	Miroslav Jovanović 48'; Kamberović 61'	Stadium: Esther Shiner Stadium; Attendance: 100; Referee: Ramee Arbaji

August 6	Royal Toronto FC	0–5	Serbian White Eagles	Toronto, Ontario
		Report	Ivan Nikolić 21', 26'; Vukomanović 51'; Jocić 55'; Miloš Ljubenović 80'	Stadium: Birchmount Stadium; Attendance: 100; Referee: E. Gustavo

August 11	Serbian White Eagles	0–0	York Region Shooters	Toronto, Ontario
		Report		Stadium: Centennial Park Stadium; Attendance: 100

August 18	Serbian White Eagles	8–1	Milton SC	Toronto, Ontario
	Milos Ljubenović 7'; Jocić 30'; Vukomanović 39', 59'; Miroslav Jovanović 47', 60'; Stanković 64', 71'	Report	Peter Edika 15'	Stadium: Centennial Park Stadium; Attendance: 200; Referee: Greg Brown

August 25	York Region Shooters	1–0	Serbian White Eagles	Vaughan, Ontario
	Edwards 67'	Report		Stadium: St. Joan of Arc Turf Field; Attendance: 100; Referee: E. Gustavo

September 2	FC Vorkuta	2–3	Serbian White Eagles	Toronto, Ontario
		Report	Milan Kušić; Pešić,	Stadium: Esther Shiner Stadium

==== League table ====
===== Second Division =====
Pos	Team	Pld	W	D	L	GF	GA	GD	Pts	Qualification
1	FC Ukraine United (C, O)	14	13	1	0	75	10	+65	40	Playoffs
2	Burlington SC	14	10	1	3	44	18	+26	31	Playoffs
3	FC Vorkuta B	14	8	0	6	41	25	+16	24	Playoffs
4	Brantford Galaxy B	14	7	1	6	29	35	−6	22	Playoffs
5	Serbian White Eagles B	14	6	0	8	32	59	−27	18	Playoffs
6	SC Waterloo B	14	5	1	8	26	39	−13	16	Playoffs
7	Royal Toronto B	14	5	0	9	32	58	−26	15	Playoffs
8	London City SC	14	0	0	14	11	46	−35	0	

Updated to match(es) played on September 7, 2017. Source: canadiansoccerleague.ca
Rules for classification: 1) points; 2) goal difference; 3) number of goals scored.
(C) Champions; (O) Play-off winners

==== Results summary ====
Overall								Home						Away					
Pld	W	D	L	GF	GA	GD	Pts	W	D	L	GF	GA	GD	W	D	L	GF	GA	GD
14	6	0	8	32	59	−27	18	4	0	3	14	14	0	2	0	5	18	45	−27

Last updated: September 10, 2017.
Source: CSL

==== Results by round ====
Round	1	2	3	4	5	6	7	8	9	10	11	12	13	14
Ground	H	H	A	A	A	A	A	H	A	H	H	H	A	H
Result	L	L	W	L	W	L	L	W	L	W	L	W	L	W

Updated to match(es) played on September 10, 2017. Source: CSL
A = Away; H = Home; W = Win; D = Draw; L = Loss

== Statistics ==
=== Goals and assists ===
Correct as of November 2, 2017

First Division Goals
Pos.	Playing Pos.	Nation	Name	Appearances	Goals
1	MF	(Serbia)	Đorđe Jocić	12	7
2	MF	(Serbia)	Miroslav Jovanović	14	6
2	DF	(Serbia)	Branislav Vukomanović	11	6
4	FW	(Canada)	Ivan Nikolic	5	3
4	DF	(Serbia)	Zoran Pešić	13	3
6	MF	(Canada)	Dusan Kovacevic	8	2
6	FW	(Serbia)	Vukasin Lukic	12	2
6	DF	(Serbia)	Ivan Stanković	11	2
6	MF	(Canada)	Filip Velasevic	9	2
10	FW	(Montenegro)	Luka Bojić	13	1
10	DF	(Serbia)	Vitomir Jelić	11	1
10	DF	(Serbia)	Milan Kušić	12	1
10	MF	(Serbia)	Miloš Ljubenović	14	1
10	DF	(Serbia)	Goran Švonja	14	1
Total				148	38

Second Division Goals
Pos.	Playing Pos.	Nation	Name	Appearances	Goals
1	DF	(Serbia)	Vitomir Jelić	7	4
2	FW	(Montenegro)	Luka Bojić	4	3
2	FW	(Canada)	Ivan Nikolic	5	3
4	MF	(Serbia)	Đorđe Jocić	1	2
4	MF	(Serbia)	Uros Obradovic	2	2
4	MF	(Canada)	Milos Scepanovic	3	2
4	DF	(Serbia)	Sasa Vukoje	8	2
8	MF	(Canada)	Dusan Kovacevic	3	1
8	DF	(Serbia)	Milan Kušić	2	1
8	MF	(Canada)	Rohan Mowatt	4	1
Total				39	21
