= 2018 Serbian White Eagles FC season =

Serbian White Eagles FC
2018 season
- President: Dragan Bakoč
- Head Coach: Milan Mijailović
- Canadian Soccer League: 6th place (First Division)
- CSL Championship: Quarterfinal
- Top goalscorer: Luka Bojić (5 goals)
Home colours	Away colours

The 2018 season was the twenty second season in the club's participation in the Canadian Soccer League (including Canadian National Soccer League days). Their season began on May 25, 2018 in a home match against FC Vorkuta, which resulted in a 1-1 draw. Before the commencement of the outdoor season the White Eagles became a founding member in the Arena Premier League as an indoor team. Throughout the regular CSL season the Serbs struggled to compete for a top four position as their performance declined in the later stages. The club still managed to secure a postseason berth, but saw an early departure after a defeat to SC Waterloo Region in the opening round. The club's top goalscorer was Luka Bojić with five goals.

== Summary ==
In the winter of 2017 the Arena Premier League was formed, and the Serbian White Eagles became involved in the indoor soccer realm as a founding member under the name of Serbia AS. During the indoor season the club selected Milan Mijailović as the new head coach. In their debut season in the APL the Serbs clinched a playoff by finishing fourth in the standings. Before the commencement of the 2018 outdoor season Mijailović maintained the majority of the European veterans in his formation of the roster. In the earlier rounds of the season Toronto achieved a five game undefeated streak, and maintained a strong presence in the top four. Unfortunately their performance dwindled in the final segment of the season, but still managed to secure a postseason by finishing sixth in the First Division.

In the postseason the Serbs were eliminated in the opening round to SC Waterloo Region. While in the Second Division their reserve team finished sixth in the standings as a result failed to secure a playoff berth.

== Team ==
=== First Division roster ===
As of August 10, 2018

Note: Flags indicate national team as defined under FIFA eligibility rules; some limited exceptions apply. Players may hold more than one non-FIFA nationality.

No.	Pos.	Nation	Player
2	MF	SRB	Dragan Dragutinovic
3	DF	SRB	Vitomir Jelic
4	FW	MNE	Luka Bojić
5	MF	SRB	Đorđe Jočić
6	MF		Ali Talha
7	MF		Djorjije Strunjas
8	DF	SRB	Radenko Kamberovic
10	FW	CAN	Milos Scepanovic
11	DF	SRB	Bojan Pavlović
12	DF	SRB	Branislav Vukomanovic
14	MF	SRB	Marko Marović
15	MF		Milan Kusic
16	MF		Mihailo Madzar
17	DF		Goran Kamber
19	FW		Vukasin Lukic

No.	Pos.	Nation	Player
21	MF		Seungkwon Baik
40	GK	SRB	Goran Skaric
-	MF	CAN	Dusan Kovacevic
-	MF	CAN	Misel Klisara
-	FW		Milos Ljubenovic
-	FW		Bojan Nedeljkovic
-	DF	CAN	Ivan Nikolic
-	GK		Nemanja Radenkovic
-	MF		Milos Rudan
-	MF	SRB	Ivan Stanković
-	MF	JAM	Kyle Stewart
-	MF	SRB	Goran Svonja
-	MF	CAN	Filip Velasevic
-	GK		Bojan Vranic

=== Second Division roster ===
As of September 19, 2018

Note: Flags indicate national team as defined under FIFA eligibility rules; some limited exceptions apply. Players may hold more than one non-FIFA nationality.

No.	Pos.	Nation	Player
–			Lufty Abdulitif
–	DF	CAN	Danilo Bakoc
–			Deishat Delaver
–	GK	CAN	Djordje Doslo
–	DF		Spyridos Douvros
–			Peter Gentles
–	DF		Dimitrije Jankovic
–	MF		Ondrej Kacmar
8	MF		Domenic Kacmar
–	GK	CAN	Filip Ljubevski
–	FW		Luka Maric
–	DF	CAN	Sebastian Mentel
–	MF		David Meyde
–			Marko Milanovic
–			Lazar Milijasevic

No.	Pos.	Nation	Player
–			Aleksandar Milkovic
–			Mahmoun Mirsadeghi
–	MF		Milan Mitrovic
–			Ahmed Mohamed
–			Stefan Momic
–			Rohan Mowatt
–			Dusan Obradovic
–			Uros Obradovic
–			Jovan Pandurevic
–			Dejan Pavlovic
–			Slavko Slavija
–			Zarko Tomic
–		CAN	Aaron Vasant
–			Goran Velimirovic
–			Dusan Vrljes
–	MF	UKR	Vadym Zayarnyy

=== Management ===
Position	Staff
Head coach	Milan Mijailović
Reserve head coach	Goran Bakoc
Manager	Predrag Milkovic
Chairman	Dragan Bakoc
Sports director	Uroš Stamatović

Last updated: August 10, 2018
Source: canadiansoccerleague.ca

== Competitions ==
=== Canadian Soccer League ===
==== First Division ====
Pos	Team	Pld	W	D	L	GF	GA	GD	Pts	Qualification
1	FC Ukraine United (A, C)	16	12	2	2	60	16	+44	38	Qualification for Playoffs
2	FC Vorkuta (A, O)	16	12	2	2	55	16	+39	38	Qualification for Playoffs
3	SC Waterloo Region (A)	16	9	2	5	34	33	+1	29	Qualification for Playoffs
4	Scarborough SC (A)	16	8	5	3	34	20	+14	29	Qualification for Playoffs
5	Hamilton City SC (A)	16	8	1	7	41	38	+3	25	Qualification for Playoffs
6	Serbian White Eagles (A)	16	5	4	7	20	20	0	19	Qualification for Playoffs
7	SC Real Mississauga (A)	16	3	2	11	14	42	−28	11	Qualification for Playoffs
8	Brantford Galaxy (A)	16	3	2	11	9	37	−28	11	Qualification for Playoffs
9	CSC Mississauga	16	1	2	13	9	37	−28	5	

Updated to match(es) played on September 27, 2018. Source: http://canadiansoccerleague.ca/2018-csl-first-division-standings/
Rules for classification: 1) points; 2) goal difference; 3) number of goals scored.
(A) Advance to a further round; (C) Champions; (O) Play-off winners

==== Results summary ====
Overall								Home						Away					
Pld	W	D	L	GF	GA	GD	Pts	W	D	L	GF	GA	GD	W	D	L	GF	GA	GD
16	5	4	7	20	20	0	19	3	2	3	8	9	−1	2	2	4	12	11	+1

Last updated: September 20, 2018.
Source: 2018 Canadian Soccer League season

==== Results by round ====
Round	1	2	3	4	5	6	7	8	9	10	11	12	13	14	15	16
Ground	H	H	H	A	H	A	A	A	H	A	H	H	A	H	A	A
Result	D	W	D	D	W	L	W	L	L	W	W	L	D	L	L	L

Updated to match(es) played on September 26, 2018. Source: CSL
A = Away; H = Home; W = Win; D = Draw; L = Loss

==== Matches ====
May 25	Serbian White Eagles	1–1	FC Vorkuta	Toronto, Ontario
	Kyle Stewart 39'	Report	Haidarzhi 49'	Stadium: Centennial Park Stadium; Attendance: 150; Referee: Ihor Bohiy

June 1	Serbian White Eagles	1–0	CSC Mississauga	Toronto, Ontario
	Luka Bojić 30'	Report		Stadium: Centennial Park Stadium; Attendance: 150; Referee: Garfield Myrlone

June 8	Serbian White Eagles	0–0	Scarborough SC	Toronto, Ontario
		Report		Stadium: Centennial Park Stadium; Attendance: 150; Referee: Javier Prior

June 17	FC Ukraine United	1–1	Serbian White Eagles	Toronto, Ontario
	Malysh 37'	Report	Luka Bojić 1'	Stadium: Centennial Park Stadium

June 22	Serbian White Eagles	1–0	FC Ukraine United	Toronto, Ontario
19:00	Vukomanović 46'	Report		Stadium: Centennial Park Stadium; Attendance: 150; Referee: Marco Jaramillo

June 30	FC Vorkuta	1–0	Serbian White Eagles	Toronto, Ontario
19:00	Riabets 71'	Report		Stadium: Esther Shiner Stadium

July 13	CSC Mississauga	2–6	Serbian White Eagles	Mississauga, Ontario
19:00	Samyr Remi Oshin 67'; Danijel Ivanus 86'	Report	Dusan Kovacevic 24', 90'; Vukomanovic 48'; Djorjije Strunjas 55'; Seungkwon Baik 69', 79'	Stadium: Iceland Field

July 27	SC Real Mississauga	1–0	Serbian White Eagles	Mississauga, Ontario
20:30	Vukomanovic 81' (o.g.)	Report		Stadium: Paramount Fine Foods Centre

August 3	Serbian White Eagles	3–4	Hamilton City SC	Toronto, Ontario
19:00	Kamberovic 3'; Luka Bojić 13'; Vukomanovic 92'	Report	Lucas Raposo 24'; Sani Dey 26', 75', 89'	Stadium: Centennial Park Stadium

August 12	Brantford Galaxy	0–3	Serbian White Eagles	Hamilton, Ontario
20:30		Report	Andrej Marinkovic 8'; Milan Mitrovic 39'; Luka Bojić 51'	Stadium: Heritage Field

August 24	Serbian White Eagles	1–0	SC Real Mississauga	Toronto, Ontario
19:00	Milan Kusic	Report		Stadium: Centennial Park Stadium; Attendance: 150

August 31	Serbian White Eagles	0–1	Brantford Galaxy	Toronto, Ontario
19:00		Report	Filip Cvetic 59'	Stadium: Centennial Park Stadium

September 9	Scarborough SC	0–0	Serbian White Eagles	Toronto, Ontario
20:00		Report		Stadium: Birchmount Stadium

September 21	Serbian White Eagles	1–3	SC Waterloo Region	Toronto, Ontario
19:00	Goran Kamber 55'	Report	Estevez; Sven Arapovic 45'; Adis Hasecic 89'	Stadium: Centennial Park Stadium; Referee: Marcos Jaramillo

September 23	SC Waterloo Region	3–0	Serbian White Eagles	Waterloo, Ontario
19:00	Miodrag Kovacevic; Ivan Cutura; Adis Hasecic	Report		Stadium: RIM Park

September 25	Hamilton City SC	3–2	Serbian White Eagles	Hamilton, Ontario
	Sani Dey 18', 24'; Vukasin Kovacevic 49'	Report	Mihailo Madzar 22'; Bojan Vranic 59'	Stadium: Heritage Field

==== Postseason ====
September 29 Quarterfinal	SC Waterloo Region	2–1 (a.e.t.)	Serbian White Eagles	Waterloo, Ontario
19:30	Miodrag Kovacevic 19'; Zelenbaba 115' (pen.)	Report	Pešić 90'	Stadium: RIM Park

===== Second Division =====
Pos	Team	Pld	W	D	L	GF	GA	GD	Pts	Qualification
1	FC Vorkuta B (A, C, O)	15	12	1	2	71	20	+51	37	Qualification for Playoffs
2	Halton United (A)	15	10	0	5	48	20	+28	30	Qualification for Playoffs
3	Scarborough SC B (A)	15	8	0	7	48	40	+8	24	Qualification for Playoffs
4	Milton SC	15	7	0	8	37	50	−13	21	Qualification for Playoffs
5	Brantford Galaxy B (A)	15	5	1	9	25	32	−7	16	
6	Serbian White Eagles B	15	2	0	13	13	80	−67	6	

Updated to match(es) played on September 25, 2018. Source: http://canadiansoccerleague.ca/2018-second-division-standings/
Rules for classification: 1) points; 2) goal difference; 3) number of goals scored.
(A) Advance to a further round; (C) Champions; (O) Play-off winners

==== Results summary ====
Overall								Home						Away					
Pld	W	D	L	GF	GA	GD	Pts	W	D	L	GF	GA	GD	W	D	L	GF	GA	GD
15	2	0	13	13	80	−67	6	0	0	7	5	42	−37	2	0	6	8	38	−30

Last updated: September 20, 2018.
Source: 2018 Canadian Soccer League season

==== Results by round ====
Round	1	2	3	4	5	6	7	8	9	10	11	12	13	14
Ground	H	A	H	A	A	H	H	A	A	H	H	A	H	H
Result	L	L	L	L	W	L	L	L	W	L	L	L	L	L

Updated to match(es) played on October 20, 2018. Source: CSL
A = Away; H = Home; W = Win; D = Draw; L = Loss

==== Matches ====
May 25	Serbian White Eagles	1–12	FC Vorkuta B	Toronto, Ontario
		Report		Stadium: Centennial Park Stadium

June 16	Halton United	13–0	Serbian White Eagles B	Burlington, Ontario
		Report		Stadium: Norton Park

June 22	Serbian White Eagles B	1–4	Brantford Galaxy B	Toronto, Ontario
		Report		Stadium: Centennial Park Stadium

July 11	Scarborough SC B	4–1	Serbian White Eagles B	Vaughan, Ontario
		Report		Stadium: Joan of Arc Turf Field

July 15	FC Vorkuta B	9–1	Serbian White Eagles B	Vaughan, Ontario
		Report		Stadium: St. Roberts S.S Field

July 22	Milton SC	1–2	Serbian White Eagles B	Milton, Ontario
		Report		Stadium: Milton Sports Centre

August 3	Serbian White Eagles B	0–5	Halton United	Toronto, Ontario
		Report		Stadium: Centennial Park Stadium

August 11	Brantford Galaxy B	3–0	Serbian White Eagles B	Brantford, Ontario
		Report		Stadium: Steve Brown Sports Complex

August 15	Brantford Galaxy B	3–0	Serbian White Eagles B	Brantford, Ontario
		Report		Stadium: Steve Brown Sports Complex

August 19	Milton SC	2–4	Serbian White Eagles B	Milton, Ontario
		Report		Stadium: Milton Sports Centre

August 24	Serbian White Eagles B	1–9	Scarborough SC B	Toronto, Ontario
		Report		Stadium: Centennial Park Stadium

August 29	Serbian White Eagles B	2–6	Halton United	Toronto, Ontario
		Report		Stadium: Centennial Park Stadium

September 10	Scarborough SC B	3–0	Serbian White Eagles B	Vaughan, Ontario
21:00		Report		Stadium: Joan of Arc Turf Field

September 18	Serbian White Eagles B	0–3	FC Vorkuta B	Toronto, Ontario
19:30				Stadium: Centennial Park Stadium

September 21	Serbian White Eagles B	0–3	Milton SC	Toronto, Ontario
		Report		Stadium: Centennial Park Stadium

== Statistics ==
=== Goals ===
Correct as of October 13, 2018

First Division Goals
Pos.	Playing Pos.	Nation	Name	Appearances	Goals
1	FW	(Montenegro)	Luka Bojić	15	5
2	DF	(Serbia)	Branislav Vukomanović	-	3
3	MF	(Canada)	Dusan Kovacevic	-	2
4	DF	(Serbia)	Radenko Kamberović	-	1
4	DF		Goran Kamber	-	1
4	MF		Milan Kusic	-	1
4	MF		Mihailo Madzar	-	1
4	MF		Andrej Marinkovic	-	1
4	DF		Milan Mitrovic	-	1
4	MF		Seungkwon Baik	-	1
4	MF	(Jamaica)	Kyle Stewart	-	1
4	MF		Djorjije Strunjas	-	1
4	GK		Bojan Vranic	-	1
Total				15	20

Second Division Goals
Pos.	Playing Pos.	Nation	Name	Appearances	Goals
1	MF		Mihailo Madzar	7	2
Total				7	2
