= 2017 Milton SC season =

Milton SC
2017 season
- Owner: Jasmin Halkic
- Head Coach: Jasmin Halkic
- CSL: Quarterfinals
- Top goalscorer: Scott Damion Tristan (6 goals)
Home colours	Away colours

The 2017 Milton SC season was the fourth season in the club's participation in the Canadian Soccer League. They began the season on May 27, 2017 in an away match against FC Vorkuta. The season concluded with Milton securing a postseason berth by finishing sixth in the standings. In the preliminary rounds of the playoffs they were defeated by the York Region Shooters.

== Competitions ==
=== Canadian Soccer League ===
==== First Division ====
Pos	Team	Pld	W	D	L	GF	GA	GD	Pts	Qualification
1	FC Vorkuta (C)	14	10	2	2	43	13	+30	32	Playoffs
2	Serbian White Eagles	14	9	4	1	38	14	+24	31	Playoffs
3	York Region Shooters (O)	14	9	3	2	34	7	+27	30	Playoffs
4	Scarborough SC	14	7	3	4	37	17	+20	24	Playoffs
5	Brantford Galaxy	14	6	0	8	26	37	−11	18	Playoffs
6	Milton SC	14	2	2	10	24	75	−51	8	Playoffs
7	SC Waterloo Region	14	1	5	8	19	33	−14	8	Playoffs
8	Royal Toronto FC	14	1	3	10	20	45	−25	6	Playoffs

Updated to match(es) played on September 11, 2017. Source: canadiansoccerleague.ca
Rules for classification: 1) points; 2) goal difference; 3) number of goals scored.
(C) Champions; (O) Play-off winners

===== Results summary =====
Overall								Home						Away					
Pld	W	D	L	GF	GA	GD	Pts	W	D	L	GF	GA	GD	W	D	L	GF	GA	GD
14	2	2	10	24	75	−51	8	1	1	5	14	36	−22	1	1	5	10	39	−29

Last updated: September 10, 2017.
Source: CSL

===== Results by round =====
Round	1	2	3	4	5	6	7	8	9	10	11	12	13	14
Ground	A	A	A	H	A	H	H	H	H	A	H	A	H	A
Result	L	L	L	L	D	L	L	W	L	L	D	W	L	L

Updated to match(es) played on September 10, 2017. Source: CSL
A = Away; H = Home; W = Win; D = Draw; L = Loss

===== Matches =====
May 27	FC Vorkuta	7–0	Milton SC	Toronto, Ontario
	Kerchu 9', 89'; Lazar 16'; Shutov 36', 39'; Gostiev 52'; Svorak 82'	Report		Stadium: Esther Shiner Stadium

June 12	York Region Shooters	7–0	Milton SC	Vaughan, Ontario
		Report		Stadium: St. Joan Of Arc Turf Field

June 24	Brantford Galaxy	4–1	Milton SC	Brantford, Ontario
	Maksim Bosic 17'; Dragan Milovic 35'; Cabrilo 41'; Vukovic 75'	Report	Fazlagić 78'	Stadium: Steve Brown Sports Complex

July 2	Milton SC	3–4	Serbian White Eagles	Milton, Ontario
	Leandro Aguilar 23'; Lucky Maghori 26', 51'	Report	Vukasin Lukic 10', 14'; Jočić 30'; Miroslav Jovanović 45'	Stadium: Milton Community Park; Referee: Garfield

July 27	Royal Toronto FC	4–4	Milton SC	Vaughan, Ontario
	Luka Grgic 1'; Mateo Beslic 6'; Dario Brezak 75'; Dymtro Chyzhevsky 80'	Report	Ivan Juric 9'; Adnan Smajic 45'; James Natham 50'; Scott Damion Tristan 65'	Stadium: Ontario Soccer Centre

July 30	Milton SC	1–7	York Region Shooters	Milton, Ontario
	Danny Jirta	Report	Alton Ellis,, Evan Butler; Bryan; Doryan Bothelo,	Stadium: Milton Community Park

August 4	Milton SC	1–7	Royal Toronto FC	Milton, Ontario
		Report	Luka Majstorovic,,	Stadium: Milton Community Park

August 6	Milton SC	4–3	SC Waterloo Region	Milton, Ontario
	Scott Damion Tristan,,	Report		Stadium: Milton Community Park

August 9	Milton SC	0–3	Brantford Galaxy	Milton, Ontario
		Report		Stadium: Milton Community Center

August 18	Serbian White Eagles	8–1	Milton SC	Toronto, Ontario
	Milos Ljubenović 7'; Jočić 30'; Vukomanović 39', 59'; Miroslav Jovanović 47', 60'; Stanković 64', 71'	Report	Peter Edika 15'	Stadium: Centennial Park Stadium; Attendance: 200; Referee: Greg Brown

August 23	Milton SC	5–5	Scarborough SC	Milton, Ontario
	William Mokake, Scott Damion Tristan, Adnan Smajic	Report	Adrian Todorovic, Bibishkov, Karadachki	Stadium: Milton Community Park

August 27	SC Waterloo	2–4	Milton SC	Waterloo, Ontario
	Mato Mrkonjic; Ilija Bajcetic	Report	Adnan Smajic, Leandro Aguilar,	Stadium: RIM Park

August 30	Milton SC	0–7	FC Vorkuta	Milton, Ontario
		Report	Ivliev, Solonynko, Volodymyr Rudyi; Kerchu; Diachenko	Stadium: Jean Vanier Stadium

September 2	Scarborough SC	7–0	Milton SC	Toronto, Ontario
	Stojiljković,,, Bibishkov, Marc Jankovic	Report		Stadium: Birchmount Stadium

== Statistics ==
=== Goals and assists ===
Correct as of November 10, 2017

First Division Goals
Pos.	Playing Pos.	Nation	Name	Appearances	Goals
1	DF	(Canada)	Scott Damion Tristan	13	6
2	FW	(Bosnia and Herzegovina)	Adnan Smajic	10	4
3	DF		Leandro Aguilar	11	3
4	DF		Lucky Maghori		2
5	MF		Peter Edika		1
5	MF	(Bosnia and Herzegovina)	Haris Fazlagic		1
5	DF		Danny Jirta		1
5	MF		Ivan Juric		1
5	MF		William Mokake		1
5	MF		James Natham		1
Total				34	21
