= Ivan Stanković =

Ivan Stanković may refer to:

- Ivan Stanković (footballer, born 1976)
- Ivan Stanković (footballer, born 1983)
- Ivan Stanković (handballer)
