= Volodymyr Rudyi =

Ukrainian footballer

Personal information
- Full name: Volodymyr Volodymyrovych Rudyi
- Date of birth: 16 June 1990 (age 36)
- Place of birth: Ukrainian SSR
- Position: Defender

Senior career*
Years	Team	Apps	(Gls)
2008–2009	Dynamo Khmelnytskyi	21	(0)
2009–2011	Bastion Illichivsk	29	(2)
2011–2012	Nyva Ternopil	14	(0)
2012	Sauvignon Tairove	4	(0)
2013–2015	Luxeon Odesa	36	(4)
2015	Ytterhogdals	1	(1)
2015	Myssjö-Ovikens	10	(5)
2016	Luxeon Odesa	6	(6)
2017	FC Vorkuta		
2018–2019	Luxeon Odesa	20	(4)
2021	Berezino		
2022	Tytan Odesa		
- * Club domestic league appearances and goals

Volodymyr Rudyi (born June 16, 1990) is a former Ukrainian footballer who played as a defender.

== Club career ==
=== Early career ===
Rudyi played in the Ukrainian Second League with Dynamo Khmelnytsky. He remained in the third division the following season by signing with Bastion Illichivsk. After a season in the Odesa region, he returned to Western Ukraine to play with Nyva Ternopil. He left Ternopil midway through the season as the club was experiencing financial problems. Rudyi played in the national amateur league for the remainder of the season with Sauvignon Tairove. In 2013, he played in the regional Odesa league with Luxeon Odesa for three seasons.

=== Sweden ===
In 2015, Rudyi played abroad in the Swedish Division 3 with Ytterhogdals IK. His tenure with Ytterhogdals was short-lived as he played the remainder of the campaign with Myssjö-Ovikens IF. He played in 11 matches and recorded 6 goals in the Swedish circuit.

=== Ukraine ===
After a short stint abroad, he returned to his former club Luxeon Odesa.

=== Canada ===
In the summer of 2017, he played abroad in the Canadian Soccer League with FC Vorkuta. Throughout the season, he assisted the club in securing the league's first division title. He contributed a goal in the quarterfinal round of the playoffs that helped advance the club to the next round. Vorkuta would be eliminated from the tournament in the following round by Scarborough SC. After the conclusion of the season, he left the club.

=== Ukraine ===
Following his stint abroad in Canada, he returned to Luxeon Odesa in 2018. In 2022, he played with Tytan Odesa.

== Honors ==
FC Vorkuta

- Canadian Soccer League First Division: 2017
