= Ihor Zhuk =

Ukrainian footballer

Personal information
- Full name: Ihor Viktoroych Zhuk
- Date of birth: March 19, 1992 (age 34)
- Place of birth: Ukraine
- Position: Defender

Senior career*
Years	Team	Apps	(Gls)
2009–2011	Veres Rivne	21	(0)
2014	Fk Sokil Sadove		
2019	Kingsman SC		
- * Club domestic league appearances and goals as of 20 February 2021

Ihor Zhuk (born March 19, 1992) is a Ukrainian footballer who plays as a defender.

== Career ==
Zhuk played in the Ukrainian Second League in the 2009–10 season with NK Veres Rivne. He returned the following season and appeared in 12 matches. In 2014, he played with Fk Sokil Sadove. In 2019, he played abroad in the Canadian Soccer League with Kingsman SC.
