= Volodymyr Pidvirnyi =

Ukrainian footballer

Personal information
- Full name: Volodymyr Petrovych Pidvirnyi
- Date of birth: 12 January 1990 (age 36)
- Place of birth: Lviv, Ukrainian SSR, Soviet Union
- Position: Defender

Senior career*
Years	Team	Apps	(Gls)
2006–2011	Karpaty-2 Lviv	53	(2)
2006–2011	Karpaty Lviv	0	(0)
2010–2012	Enerhetyk Burshtyn	24	(0)
2012–2013	Mykolaiv	3	(0)
2014	Sambir	10	(0)
2014–2015	MFK Vranov nad Topľou		
2014–2015	Widzew Łódź	10	(0)
2014–2015	SV Blau-Weiß 90 Neustad	10	(0)
2015	SCC Demnya		
2015–2016	Błękitni Raciąż		
2016–2017	Cosmos Nowotaniec	14	(1)
2017	FC Vorkuta	9	(2)
2019	FC Vorkuta II		

International career
2006	Ukraine U16	4	(0)
2007	Ukraine U17	15	(0)
2008	Ukraine U18	7	(0)
- * Club domestic league appearances and goals

Volodymyr Pidvirnyi (Ukrainian: Володимир Петрович Підвірний; born January 12, 1990) is a Ukrainian former footballer who played as a defender.

Pidvirnyi began his professional career by signing with Karpaty Lviv in 2006, where he only saw action in the Ukrainian Second League with Karpaty's reserve team. After five seasons with Karpaty, he left in 2010 to play in the Ukrainian First League with Enerhetyk Burshtyn. He left Ukraine to play initially abroad in the Slovak circuit, followed by stints in Germany and Poland. In 2017, he left Poland to finish his career in Canada.

== Club career ==
=== Ukraine ===
Pidvirnyi began his career in 2006 with Karpaty Lviv, but was loaned to the Ukrainian Second League with FC Karpaty-2 Lviv. After five seasons with Karpaty's reserve team, he left in 2010 to sign with Enerhetyk Burshtyn in the Ukrainian First League.

After Enerhetyk was experiencing financial problems, he signed with Mykolaiv in the Ukrainian third-tier league. During his time with Mykolaiv, he made his debut in the 2012–13 Ukrainian Cup against Kremin Kremenchuk. In 2014, he played in the regional Lviv league with FC Sambir.

=== Abroad ===
In 2014, he ventured abroad to play in the Slovak 3. Liga with MFK Vranov nad Topľou. His stint in Slovakia was short-lived, as he signed a one-year deal with Widzew Łódź in the Polish I liga. The remainder of the 2014-15 season was spent in the German Thüringenliga with SV Blau-Weiß 90 Neustadt. He returned to his native country to play in the regional amateur level with SCC Demnya in 2015.

=== Poland ===
Pidvirnyi returned to Poland for the remainder of the 2015-16 season to play in the country's III Liga with Błękitni Raciąż. The following season, he remained in the Polish fourth-tier league by signing with Cosmos Nowotaniec.

=== Canada ===
In the summer of 2017, he played in the Canadian Soccer League with FC Vorkuta. Pidvirnyi recorded his first two goals on June 4, 2017, against SC Waterloo Region. In his debut season in the Canadian circuit, he helped Vorkuta win the league's first division title. In the playoff tournament, Vorkuta was eliminated in the semifinal round by Scarborough SC.

Pidvirnyi returned to the Canadian circuit in 2019 to play with Vorkuta's reserve team in the league's second division. He helped the club secure the divisional title. In the playoffs, Vorkuta defeated the Serbian White Eagles' reserve team for the championship.

== International career ==
Pidvirnyi represented the Ukraine national under-16 football team in the 2006 Aegean Sea Cup. In 2007, he was selected to represent the Ukraine national under-17 football team in the 2007 UEFA European Under-17 Championship.

== Honors ==
FC Vorkuta

- Canadian Soccer League First Division: 2017

FC Vorkuta II

- CSL Championship II: 2019
- Canadian Soccer League Second Division: 2019
