= Bohdan Sluka =

Ukrainian footballer

Personal information
- Full name: Bohdan Vasylovych Sluka
- Date of birth: September 12, 1988 (age 38)
- Place of birth: Lviv, Ukrainian SSR, Soviet Union
- Height: 1.81 m (5 ft 11 in)
- Position: Midfielder

Senior career*
Years	Team	Apps	(Gls)
2006–2008	SC Tavriya Simferopol	0	(0)
2009–2010	Nyva Ternopil	15	(0)
2010–2011	FC Enerhetyk Burshtyn	25	(0)
2011–2013	FC Hirnyk-Sport Horishni Plavni	41	(1)
2015–2018	SCC Demnya		
2018	FC Vorkuta		
2019	Kingsman SC		
- * Club domestic league appearances and goals as of 22 November 2019

Bohdan Sluka (born September 12, 1988) is a Ukrainian footballer who plays as a midfielder.

== Playing career ==
Sluka signed a contract in 2006 with SC Tavriya Simferopol. After failing to make an appearance with Tavriya he signed with Nyva Ternopil in the Ukrainian First League. After a season in Ternopil he signed with FC Enerhetyk Burshtyn. In 2011, he played in the Ukrainian Second League with FC Hirnyk-Sport Horishni Plavni. He later played three seasons in the Ukrainian Amateur Football Championship with SCC Demnya, and made appearances in the 2015–16 Ukrainian Cup, and 2017–18 Ukrainian Cup.

In 2018, he played abroad in the Canadian Soccer League with FC Vorkuta. In his debut season with Vorkuta he assisted in securing the CSL Championship. The following season he was transferred to expansion franchise Kingsman SC for the 2019 season.
