= Vitaliy Dnistryan =

Ukrainian footballer

Personal information
- Full name: Vitaliy Petrovych Dnistryan
- Date of birth: March 31, 1990 (age 36)
- Place of birth: Turka, Ukrainian SSR, Soviet Union
- Position: Midfielder

Senior career*
| Years | Team | Apps | (Gls) |
| 2008–2009 | Lviv | 0 | (0) |
| 2009–2010 | Enerhetyk Burshtyn | 15 | (2) |
| 2010–2013 | Skala Stryi | 56 | (13) |
| 2011–2012 | →Mykolaiv (loan) | 4 | (0) |
| 2012–2013 | Krymteplytsia Molodizhne | 10 | (1) |
| 2013–2015 | Stal Dniprodzerzhynsk | 47 | (10) |
| 2015 | Mykolaiv | 9 | (1) |
| 2015–2016 | Veres Rivne | 6 | (2) |
| 2016 | FC Ukraine United | 19 | (3) |
| 2017 | FC Vorkuta | | |
| 2017 | →FC Vorkuta II | 6 | (3) |
- * Club domestic league appearances and goals

Vitaliy Dnistryan (Ukrainian: Віталій Петрович Дністрян; born March 31, 1990) is a Ukrainian former footballer who played as a midfielder.

Dnistryan was a product and graduate of FC Lviv's youth system, where he failed to make an appearance for the senior team. In 2009, he made his professional debut with Enerhetyk Burshtyn. In the initial stages of his professional career, he played with clubs based in Western Ukraine. Later, he ventured to Southern Ukraine to play with Krymteplytsia Molodizhne and Stal Dniprodzerzhynsk and returned to Western Ukraine in the latter stage of his career. In 2016, Dnistryan played abroad in Canada, where he finished his career.

== Club career ==
=== Ukraine ===
Dnistryan began his career at the youth level with FC Lviv and secured a contract with the senior team in 2008. Though he signed with the Lviv senior team, he debuted professionally in the Ukrainian First League with Enerhetyk Burshtyn in 2009. His tenure in Burshtyn was short-lived as he signed with Skala Stryi in the country's third-tier league the next season. Throughout his stint with Skala, he debuted in the 2010–11 Ukrainian Cup against Sumy. After a season with Skala, he was loaned to Mykolaiv for the first portion of the 2011-12 season.

Following his brief loan spell with Mykolaiv, he returned to Skala to play with the club until the 2012-13 season. In 2012, he returned to the Ukrainian second division league by signing with Krymteplytsia Molodizhne. Following his stint with the Crimean-based club, he returned to the country's third division league to sign with Stal Dniprodzerzhynsk. In his debut season with Stal, he helped the club secure a promotion by finishing as runners-up. He re-signed with the club the following season, but was released midway through the season due to limited available playing time.

After his release from Stal, he played in the local Lviv amateur league with FC Mykolaiv. Dnistryan returned to the professional level in 2015 by signing with Veres Rivne.

=== Canada ===
After his release from Veres, he was recruited abroad in the summer of 2016 to compete in the Canadian Soccer League with FC Ukraine United. In his debut season in the Canadian circuit, he helped Ukraine secure a postseason berth by finishing second in the league's first division. The western Toronto side defeated the Brantford Galaxy in the quarterfinal round. Ukraine's playoff journey would conclude in the next round after a defeat by the Serbian White Eagles. Throughout the 2016 season, he appeared in 19 matches and recorded 3 goals.

Once his contract with Ukraine United expired, he signed with league debutant FC Vorkuta in 2017. In Vorkuta's debut year in the league, he assisted the club in securing the divisional title. In the playoff tournament, Vorkuta was eliminated in the semifinal round by Scarborough SC.

== Honors ==
Stal Dniprodzerzhynsk

- Ukrainian Second League runner-up: 2013–14

FC Vorkuta

- Canadian Soccer League First Division: 2017
