= Maksym Hramm =

Ukrainian footballer (born 1991)

Personal information
- Full name: Maksym Andriyevych Hramm
- Date of birth: 27 January 1991 (age 35)
- Place of birth: Kryvyi Rih, Ukraine SSR, Soviet Union
- Position: Midfielder

Youth career
- 2004–2006: Kryvbas Kryvyi Rih
- 2006–2007: Dynamo Kyiv
- 2007–2008: Dnipro Dnipropetrovsk

Senior career*
Years	Team	Apps	(Gls)
2008–2009	Dnipro Dnipropetrovsk	0	(0)
2009	Kryvbas Kryvyi Rih	0	(0)
2010	Hirnyk Kryvyi Rih	17	(1)
2012–2013	Krystal Kherson	26	(0)
2014–2016	Lozuvatka Kryvyi Rih (amateurs)		
2016	Ternopil	4	(0)
2017–2018	FC Vorkuta B	8	(2)
2019	Kingsman SC		
2022	Toronto Falcons		
2023	Dynamo Toronto		
- * Club domestic league appearances and goals as of 20 June 2019

Maksym Andriyevych Hramm (Ukrainian: Максим Андрійович Грамм; born 27 January 1991) is a Ukrainian footballer who plays as a midfielder.

== Club career ==
=== Ukraine ===
Hramm was a product of the Dnipro Dnipropetrivsk academy system. After failing to transition into the senior team, he began his professional career in the Ukrainian Second League with Hirnyk Kryvyi Rih in 2009. Throughout his two-year tenure with Hirnyk, he appeared in 17 matches and recorded 1 goal.

In 2012, he remained in the third tier to play with Krystal Kherson. In total, he appeared in 26 matches for Kherson. Following his stint with Kherson, he played at the amateur level with Lozuvatka Kryvyi Rih. In 2016, he returned to the professional level to sign with Ternopil in the Ukrainian First League. His stint with Ternopil was short-lived, as he was released two months later. In total, he played in four matches in the second tier.

After his release from Ternopil, he returned to his former club, Lozuvatka Kryvyi Rih.

=== Canada ===
In the summer of 2017, he went abroad to play in the Canadian Soccer League with FC Vorkuta. He assisted the club in securing the First Division title in his debut season. In his second season with Vorkuta, he assisted in securing the CSL Championship.

After two seasons with Vorkuta, he was transferred to the expansion franchise Kingsman SC for the 2019 season. He helped Kingsman secure a playoff berth when they defeated Vorkuta in the opening round of the competition. The club was eliminated from the playoffs in the next round by Scarborough SC.

In 2022, he returned to the CSL circuit to sign with the Toronto Falcons. After a season with the Falcons, he signed with another expansion franchise, Dynamo Toronto for the 2023 campaign.

== Honors ==
FC Vorkuta

- CSL Championship: 2018
- Canadian Soccer League First Division: 2017
