= Mykhailo Bulkin =

Ukrainian footballer

Personal information
- Full name: Mykhailo Petrovich Bulkin
- Date of birth: February 8, 1991 (age 35)
- Place of birth: Ukraine SSR, Soviet Union
- Position: Midfielder

Senior career*
Years	Team	Apps	(Gls)
2008–2010	Ros Bila Tserkva	15	(0)
2010–2011	Desna Chernihiv	9	(0)
2011–2012	Dynamo Khmelnytskyi	13	(0)
2012–2013	Arsenal Bila Tserkva	4	(0)
2014	Podillya Khmelnytskyi		
2016	FC Ukraine United		
2017	FC Vorkuta		
- * Club domestic league appearances and goals

Mykhailo Bulkin (Ukrainian: Михайло Петрович Булкін; born February 8, 1991) is a Ukrainian former footballer who played as a midfielder.

Bulkin started his career at the youth level with Dynamo Khmelnytskyi. He joined the professional ranks in 2008 with Ros Bila Tserkva and played several years in the Ukrainian Second League. Ultimately, he landed in the Ukrainian First League with Arsenal Bila Tserkva. Following his brief run with Arsenal, he played locally and finally abroad in Canada, where he finished his career.

== Club career ==
=== Ukraine ===
Bulkin was a product of Dynamo Khmelnytskyi's youth system. After graduating from Dynamo, he joined the professional ranks in 2008 by signing with Ros Bila Tserkva in the Ukrainian Second League. His tenure in Bila Tserkva lasted for two seasons, during which he appeared in a total of 15 matches. In the summer of 2010, he joined division rivals Desna Chernihiv and made his debut in the Ukrainian Cup against Enerhiya Nova Kakhovka. In his single season with Desna, he made 9 league appearances.

Bulkin returned to his former club, Dynamo Khmelnytskyi, by joining the senior team in 2011. His time with Dynamo was short-lived as he left the club at the end of the season. Following his departure from Dynamo, he signed with Arsenal Bila Tserkva, which played in the Ukrainian First League. His time in the country's second-tier league was cut short as he was released after the arrival of a new manager. After his release from Arsenal, he rejoined his former club Dynamo Khmelnytskyi under their new name Podillya Khmelnytskyi in the Ukrainian Amateur Football Championship.

=== Canada ===
In the summer of 2016, Bulkin played abroad in the Canadian Soccer League with FC Ukraine United. In his debut season in the Canadian circuit, he helped the club secure a playoff berth by finishing second in the league's first division. In the first round of the playoffs, the club defeated the Brantford Galaxy. The club's playoff run ended in the next round after a defeat by the Serbian White Eagles.

The following season, he signed with league rivals FC Vorkuta. Throughout the season, he assisted Vorkuta in securing the divisional title. Vorkuta would be eliminated from the playoffs in the first round by Scarborough SC.

== Managerial career ==
In 2021, he became a youth coach for Podillya Khmelnytskyi.

== Honors ==
FC Vorkuta

- Canadian Soccer League First Division: 2017
