= Evan Beutler =

American soccer player

Personal information
- Date of birth: 26 November 1992 (age 33)
- Place of birth: Enterprise, Alabama, U.S.
- Position: Midfielder

Youth career
- Enterprise Wings

College career
Years	Team	Apps	(Gls)
2011	Lipscomb Bisons	11	(1)
2012–2014	West Alabama Tigers	52	(13)

Senior career*
Years	Team	Apps	(Gls)
2015–2016	Waza Flo (indoor)	18	(5)
2016–2017	York Region Shooters		
2019–2020	Erie Commodores		
- * Club domestic league appearances and goals

Evan Beutler (born 26 November 1992) is an American former soccer player who played as a midfielder.

Beutler spent a single season with the Lipscomb Bisons in 2011 before transferring to the University of West Alabama where he played three seasons with the West Alabama Tigers. After graduating from university, he played a season of indoor soccer with the Waza Flo in 2015, where they were eliminated in the first round of the play-offs. In 2016, Beutler played semi-professional soccer in Canada with the York Region Shooters for two seasons. Beutler was not signed to a team throughout 2018, but in 2019, he signed with the amateur club Erie Commodores and played two seasons with them before retiring from the sport. After retiring from competitive soccer, he transitioned to coaching.

== Youth career ==
Beutler played his youth soccer at the local YMCA and with his high school team at Enterprise High School. He was the team captain in his final year with Enterprise and recorded 24 goals. The team qualified for the championship match and was defeated by Oak Mountain. Beutler was named the region's Player of the Year after his successful season.

== College career ==
In 2011, Beutler enrolled in Lipscomb University's soccer program. In Nashville, he appeared in 11 matches and scored 1 goal. Aside from his soccer career, he was named to the university's spring and fall provost list. Throughout his tenure at Lipscomb, he was inducted into Phi Beta Kappa.

After one season with Lipscomb, Beutler was transferred to the University of West Alabama. In his debut season with the West Alabama Tigers, he finished as the team's third-highest goal scorer with five goals. Throughout his three-year tenure with West Alabama, he served as the team captain and was named to the All-Gulf South Conference First Team.

== Club career ==
After Beutler graduated from West Alabama, he received his first professional tryout with the USL-side Harrisburg City Islanders. In the winter of 2015, he transitioned to the indoor level by signing with Waza Flo in the Major Arena Soccer League. He helped the Detroit-based team clinch a playoff berth by finishing third in the eastern division. Their playoff journey concluded in the opening round after a defeat by the Syracuse Silver Knights. In his debut season in the indoor circuit, he appeared in 18 matches and recorded 5 goals.

In 2016, Beutler played abroad in the Canadian Soccer League with the York Region Shooters. He helped the Vaughan-based club win the league's first division title. In the preliminary round of the playoffs, the Shooters defeated Milton SC. Their playoff run lasted until the next round as Hamilton City eliminated them in a penalty shootout.

Beutler returned to York Region for the 2017 season and recorded his first hat trick for the club on 18 August 2017, against Royal Toronto FC. He helped Vaughan secure a playoff berth by finishing third in the division. York Region qualified for the championship finals after defeating the Serbian White Eagles in the semifinals. In the championship match, he scored the equalizing goal against Scarborough SC, where York Region won the title in a penalty shootout.

In 2019, Beutler returned to the United States to play in the National Premier Soccer League with Erie Commodores. Throughout the 2019 season, he debuted in the 2019 U.S. Open Cup tournament and played against PDL side Dayton Dutch Lions. He returned to play with Erie for the 2020 season.

== Managerial career ==
In 2020, Girard High School named Beutler the head coach for the high school's girls' soccer program. He also serves as the under-11/12 boys soccer head coach.

== Honors ==
York Region Shooters

- CSL Championship: 2017
- Canadian Soccer League First Division: 2016
