= Andriy Lemishevsky =

Ukrainian footballer

Personal information
- Full name: Andriy Valeriyovich Lemishevsky
- Date of birth: October 1, 1987 (age 39)
- Place of birth: Chernihiv, Ukraine SSR, Soviet Union
- Position: Midfielder

Senior career*
Years	Team	Apps	(Gls)
2006	Iskra-Skirts		
2006–2008	FC Podillya Khmelnytskyi	28	(3)
2008–2010	FC Dynamo Khmelnytskyi	24	(1)
2010–2011	FC Yednist' Plysky	20	(3)
2011–2012	FC Dynamo Khmelnytskyi	16	(2)
2012–2013	FC Ahrobiznes Volochysk		
2016	FC Ukraine United		
2017	FC Vorkuta B	8	(1)
- * Club domestic league appearances and goals

Andriy Lemishevsky (born October 1, 1987) is a Ukrainian footballer.

== Playing career ==
Lemishevsky began his career in 2006 with Iskra-Skirts in the Ukrainian Football Amateur League. In 2007, he signed with FC Podillya Khmelnytskyi of the Ukrainian Second League, where he featured in a total of 28 matches. In 2008, he transferred to FC Dynamo Khmelnytskyi, and played in 23 matches. Lemishevsky had stints with FC Yednist' Plysky, FC Dynamo Khmelnytskyi, and FC Ahrobiznes Volochysk. In 2016, he went overseas to Canada to sign with FC Ukraine United of the Canadian Soccer League. The following season he played with FC Vorkuta.
