= Danylo Lazar =

Ukrainian footballer

Personal information
- Full name: Danylo Ihorovych Lazar
- Date of birth: 30 December 1989 (age 36)
- Place of birth: Lviv, Ukrainian SSR, Soviet Union
- Height: 1.84 m (6 ft 1/2 in)
- Position: Defender

Youth career
- 2002–2003: FC Sokil-Rukh Lviv

Senior career*
Years	Team	Apps	(Gls)
2009–2010	FC Lviv-2	18	(0)
2010	FC Lviv	1	(0)
2010	FC Dynamo Khmelnytskyi	13	(0)
2011–2012	FC Lviv	22	(0)
2011–2012	FC Hirnyk-Sport Komsomolsk	9	(0)
2012–2013	FC Stal Kamianske	6	(0)
2015	FC Mykolaiv		
2015–2016	NK Veres Rivne	4	(0)
2016	FC Ukraine United		
2017	FC Vorkuta	10	(1)
2019–2020	FC Vorkuta		
- * Club domestic league appearances and goals

Danylo Lazar (Ukrainian: Данило Ігорович Лазар; born 30 December 1989) is a former professional Ukrainian football defender.

== Club career ==
=== Ukraine ===
Lazar played with the youth system with Lviv. In 2009, he began training with the senior team in preparation for the 2009-10 season. He would ultimately secure a deal and play in the Ukrainian First League. He would make his professional debut on March 10, 2010, against Enerhetyk Burshtyn. For the majority of the season, he played with Lviv's reserve team in the Ukrainian Second League.

After a single season in the second tier, he returned to the third-tier league to play with Dynamo Khmelnytskyi. In his debut season with Dynamo, he appeared in 13 matches. During his tenure with Dynamo, he debuted in the Ukrainian Cup against Chornomorets Odesa. Lazar left Dynamo after a single season due to financial problems with the club.

He would return to his former club, Lviv, in the winter transfer market of 2011. In total, he played in 5 matches throughout the season. Lazar would re-sign with Lviv for the following season. After a managerial change within Lviv, he remained with the organization. He left Lviv to play with Hirnyk-Sport Komsomolsk in the country's third division.

In 2012, he remained in the third tier and signed with Stal Dniprodzerzhynsk. After the conclusion of the season, he left the team. He would appear in 6 matches for Stal. In 2015, he signed with Veres Rivne. He also played at the amateur level for Mykolaiv in 2014.

=== Canada ===
In 2016, Lazar went overseas to Canada to sign with FC Ukraine United of the Canadian Soccer League. In his debut season with Ukraine United, he assisted the team in securing a playoff berth by finishing second in the league's first division. In the opening round of the postseason, the western Toronto side defeated Brantford Galaxy. The club was eliminated from the competition in the following round by the Serbian White Eagles.

After the relegation of FC Ukraine to the league's second division in 2017, he signed with the newly expansion side FC Vorkuta. He would record his first goal for Vorkuta on May 29, 2017, against Milton SC. He would help the club clinch the divisional title and also secure a playoff berth. Vorkuta was eliminated in the second round of the playoffs by Scarborough SC. Lazar returned to play with Vorkuta for the 2019 season. He would claim his second divisional title with Vorkuta as they clinched the First Division. However, the club was eliminated in the preliminary round of the postseason by Kingsman SC.

He returned for his third and final season in 2020. Vorkuta would claim their second championship title after defeating Scarborough in the playoff finals.

== Honors ==
=== FC Vorkuta ===
- CSL Championship: 2020
- Canadian Soccer League First Division: 2017, 2019
