= Serhiy Semeno =

Ukrainian footballer

Personal information
- Full name: Serhiy Valeriyovych Semeno
- Date of birth: 6 March 1990 (age 36)
- Place of birth: Orikhiv, Ukrainian SSR, Soviet Union
- Position: Goalkeeper

Senior career*
Years	Team	Apps	(Gls)
2006–2012	Illichivets Mariupol	0	(0)
2006–2012	→ Illichivets-2 Mariupol	34	(0)
2013–2015	Motor Sich Zaporizhzhia	21	(0)
2015–2016	Avanhard Kramatorsk	17	(0)
2015–2016	Veres Rivne	11	(0)
2016–2017	Myr Hornostaivka	10	(0)
2017	Vorkuta		
- * Club domestic league appearances and goals as of 24 June 2019

Serhiy Valeriyovych Semeno (born 6 March 1990) is a Ukrainian footballer.

== Career ==
Semyon began his career in 2006 with Illichivets Mariupol in the Ukrainian Premier League, though he played in the Ukrainian Second League with Illichivets-2 Mariupol. After six years with Mariupol he signed with Motor Sich Zaporizhya. In 2015, he signed with Avanhard Kramatorsk in the Ukrainian First League. He returned to the Second League to have stints with NK Veres Rivne, and Myr Hornostayivka. He went abroad in 2017 to play in the Canadian Soccer League with Vorkuta. In his debut season he assisted in securing the regular season title.
