= Myssjö-Ovikens IF =

Swedish football club

- Full name: Myssjö-Ovikens Idrottsförening
- Ground: Åsvallen; Oviken; Sweden
- League: Division 4 Jämtland/Härjedalen
Home colours	Away colours

Myssjö-Ovikens IF is a Swedish football club located in Oviken.

== Background ==
The football club was formed following the merger of the Myssjö IF and Ovikens IF clubs in 1970. Both clubs appeared regularly in Division 4 Jämtland in the 1960s and Myssjö IF played one season in Division 3 in 1968.

Myssjö-Ovikens IF currently plays in Division 4 Jämtland/Härjedalen which is the sixth tier of Swedish football. They play their home matches at the Åsvallen in Oviken.

The club is affiliated to Jämtland-Härjedalens Fotbollförbund.

== Season to season ==
In their most successful period Myssjö IF competed in the following divisions:

Season	Level	Division	Section	Position	Movements
1960	Tier 5	Division 5	Jämtland		Promoted
1961	Tier 4	Division 4	Jämtland	4th	
1962	Tier 4	Division 4	Jämtland	3rd	
1963	Tier 4	Division 4	Jämtland	4th	
1964	Tier 4	Division 4	Jämtland	5th	
1965	Tier 4	Division 4	Jämtland	5th	
1966	Tier 4	Division 4	Jämtland	2nd	
1967	Tier 4	Division 4	Jämtland	1st	Promoted
1968	Tier 3	Division 3	Södra Norrland Övre	10th	Relegated
1969	Tier 4	Division 4	Jämtland	5th	
1970	Tier 4	Division 4	Jämtland	6th	

In their most successful period Ovikens IF competed in the following divisions:

Season	Level	Division	Section	Position	Movements
1960	Tier 4	Division 4	Jämtland	7th	
1961	Tier 4	Division 4	Jämtland	7th	
1962	Tier 4	Division 4	Jämtland	5th	
1963	Tier 4	Division 4	Jämtland	10th	Relegated
1964	Tier 5	Division 5	Jämtland		
1965	Tier 5	Division 5	Jämtland		Promoted
1966	Tier 4	Division 4	Jämtland	3rd	
1967	Tier 4	Division 4	Jämtland	4th	
1968	Tier 4	Division 4	Jämtland	3rd	
1969	Tier 4	Division 4	Jämtland	4th	
1970	Tier 4	Division 4	Jämtland	8th	

The new club Myssjö-Ovikens IF were relegated in 1972 to Division 5:

Season	Level	Division	Section	Position	Movements
1971	Tier 4	Division 4	Jämtland	3rd	
1972	Tier 4	Division 4	Jämtland	11th	Relegated

In recent seasons Myssjö-Ovikens IF have competed in the following divisions:

Season	Level	Division	Section	Position	Movements
2007	Tier 7	Division 5	Jämtland/Härjedalen Södra	3rd	
2008	Tier 7	Division 5	Jämtland/Härjedalen Södra	2nd	
2009	Tier 7	Division 5	Jämtland/Härjedalen	3rd	Promoted
2010	Tier 6	Division 4	Jämtland/Härjedalen	7th	
2011	Tier 6	Division 4	Jämtland/Härjedalen	10th	

* League restructuring in 2006 resulted in a new division being created at Tier 3 and subsequent divisions dropping a level.
