= Hryhoriy Krasovskyi =

Ukrainian footballer

Hryhorii Krasovskyi
Personal information
- Full name: Hryhorii Vasilovych Krasovskyi
- Date of birth: 8 October 1982 (age 44)
- Place of birth: Kerch, Ukrainian SSR, Soviet Union
- Position: Goalkeeper

Team information
- Current team: FC Vorkuta

Senior career*
Years	Team	Apps	(Gls)
1998–1999	SC Odesa	1	(0)
1999–2003	FC Chornomorets Odesa	1	(0)
1999–2003	→FC Chornomorets-2 Odesa (loan)	25	(0)
2003–2004	FC Tyras-2500 Bilhorod-Dnistrovskyi		
2007	FC Atyrau	19	(0)
2008	FC Zhetysu	1	(0)
2008–2010	Dniester Ovdiopol	20	(0)
2011–2012	FC Real Pharma Odesa	21	(0)
2017	FC Vorkuta		
2019	Kingsman SC		
2021–	FC Vorkuta		
- * Club domestic league appearances and goals as of August 31, 2021

Hryhorii Krasovskyi (born October 8, 1982) is a Ukrainian footballer playing with FC Vorkuta in the Canadian Soccer League.

== Career ==
Krasovskyi began his career in 1998 in the Ukrainian Second League with SC Odesa. The following season he signed with FC Chornomorets Odesa, where he saw action in the Ukrainian First League including with the reserve team. In 2003, he played in the Ukrainian Amateur Football Championship with FC Tyras-2500 Bilhorod-Dnistrovskyi. He played abroad in 2007 in the Kazakhstan Premier League with FC Atyrau, and the next season with FC Zhetysu. In 2008, he returned to Ukraine to play with Dniester Ovdiopol, and later with FC Real Pharma Odesa in 2011.

In 2017, he played in the Canadian Soccer League with FC Vorkuta. He played with Canadian Soccer League expansion franchise Kingsman SC for the 2019 season. In 2021, he returned to his former club Vorkuta. He assisted in securing Vorkuta's third regular season title in 2021.
