= Yuriy Stepanyuk =

Ukrainian footballer

Personal information
- Full name: Yuriy Mykolayoyvch Stepanyuk
- Date of birth: 5 March 1983 (age 43)
- Place of birth: Soviet Union (now Ukraine)
- Position: Midfielder

Senior career*
Years	Team	Apps	(Gls)
2001–2004	Ros Bila Tserkva	46	(0)
2007–2011	Arsenal Bila Tserkva	93	(7)
2011–2012	Desna Chernihiv	3	(0)
2012–2014	UkrAhroKom Holovkivka	61	(1)
2015	Arsenal-Kyivshchyna Bila Tserkva	11	(0)
2017	Vorkuta	11	(1)
- * Club domestic league appearances and goals as of November 27, 2017

Yuriy Mykolayoyvch Stepanyuk (born 3 March 1983) is a Ukrainian footballer.

== Career ==
Stepanyuk began his career in 2001 in the Ukrainian Second League with Ros Bila Tserkva. In 2007, he signed with FC Arsenal Bila Tserkva, and won promotion to the Ukrainian First League in 2008. After four seasons in the First League he returned to the Second League with FC Desna Chernihiv. In 2012, he played with FC UkrAhroKom Holovkivka and later with Arsenal-Kyivshchyna Bila Tserkva. He went abroad in 2017 to play in the Canadian Soccer League with FC Vorkuta. He recorded his first goal for Vorkuta on June 9, 2017 against Serbian White Eagles FC.
