= Oleh Kerchu =

Ukrainian footballer and coach

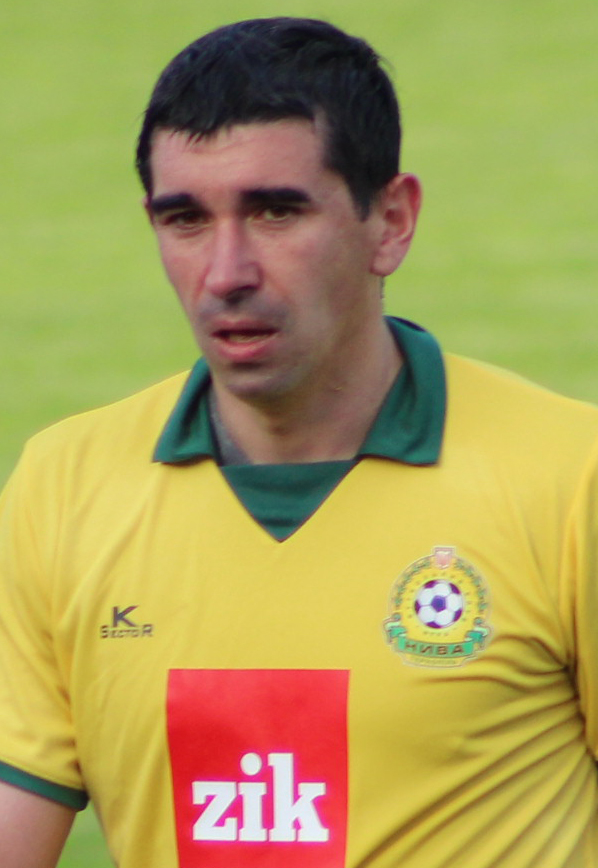
- Kerchu in 2015

Personal information
- Full name: Oleh Mykolayovych Kerchu
- Date of birth: 6 July 1984 (age 42)
- Place of birth: Chernivtsi, Ukrainian SSR
- Height: 1.78 m (5 ft 10 in)
- Position: Defender

Senior career*
Years	Team	Apps	(Gls)
2001–2005	Bukovyna Chernivtsi	123	(7)
2006	Desna Chernihiv	20	(0)
2007	Prykarpattya Ivano-Frankivsk	15	(0)
2007–2013	Bukovyna Chernivtsi	159	(12)
2014	Naftan Novopolotsk	31	(0)
2015	Nyva Ternopil	16	(3)
2016	Bukovyna Chernivtsi	4	(0)
2016	Ukraine United	20	(3)
2017	Bukovyna Chernivtsi	7	(0)
2017–2018	FC Vorkuta	27	(6)
2019	Bukovyna Chernivtsi	10	(1)
2019	Epitsentr Kamianets-Podilskyi		
2019–2020	Pokuttia Kolomyia		
2021–2022	FC Probiy Horodenka		
2023	Yastrub Polyanitsya		
- * Club domestic league appearances and goals as of 28 June 2019

Oleh Kerchu (Ukrainian: Олег Миколайович Керчу; born 6 July 1984) is a Ukrainian former footballer and currently the youth head coach for FSC Bukovyna Chernivtsi.

== Club career ==
=== Early career ===
Kerchu began his career in 2001 with Bukovyna Chernivtsi in the Ukrainian First League. In 2006, he signed with Desna Chernihiv in the Ukrainian Second League, where he helped the team secure a promotion by winning the league title. The following season, he returned to the second division by signing with Prykarpattya Ivano-Frankivsk.

In 2008, he returned to his hometown club, Bukovyna, and served as team captain. During his second tenure with Bukovyna, he helped the club win the league title during the 2009/2010 season, which secured them a promotion to the first league.

=== Belarus ===
In the early winter of 2014, he was invited north of the border for a trial with Naftan Novopolotsk. Ultimately, he secured a deal with the club to compete in the Belarusian Premier League. Throughout the season, he appeared in 31 matches for Naftan. He left the Belarus circuit after a single season. Kerchu would help the club finish fifth in the Belarusian top tier.

Following his stint abroad, he returned to the Ukrainian second division to sign with Nyva Ternopil. After the conclusion of the 2014-15 season, his contract with Ternopil was renewed for another season. His second season with Ternopil was short-lived as he left the team several months later. Kerchu would finish the remainder of the Ukrainian campaign with his former club, Bukovyna Chernivtsi.

=== Canada ===
Following his brief stint with Bukovyna, he was linked to a possible move abroad to the Canadian side Toronto Atomic. Instead, he would sign with expansion side Ukraine United in the Canadian Soccer League's first division in the summer of 2016. In his debut season, he appeared in 20 matches, recorded 3 goals, and helped secure a postseason berth by finishing second in the division. The western Toronto side defeated the Brantford Galaxy in the quarterfinal round. Ukraine's playoff journey would conclude in the next round after a defeat by the Serbian White Eagles.

Kerchu returned to the Canadian circuit in the summer of 2017 to sign with Vorkuta. He would be named the team captain and score his first pair of goals in his debut match against Milton SC. In Vorkuta's debut year in the league, he assisted the club in securing the divisional title. Kerchu would contribute a goal in Vorkuta's win over Royal Toronto in the opening round of the playoffs. Ultimately, Vorkuta would be eliminated in the following round by Scarborough SC.

He re-signed with Vorkuta for the 2018 season. In his second season with the club, he helped to secure another playoff berth by finishing second in the division. Their opponents in the preliminary round were Real Mississauga, where they successfully defeated the club. In the semifinal round, Vorkuta would defeat SC Waterloo Region in a penalty shootout to advance to the league championship final. Kerchu would help Vorkuta claim their first league championship after defeating Scarborough.

=== Return to Ukraine ===
After the conclusion of the Canadian season, he returned to his former club, Bukovyna, to compete in the 2016–17 campaign. He played 7 matches during the club's run in the country's second division.

Kerchu left the Canadian circuit after three seasons and played his final season with Bukovyna in 2019. In 2020, he began playing at the regional amateur circuit with Pokuttia Kolomyia. The following year, he played with Probiy Horodenka.

== Managerial career ==
In 2020, he was named the youth head coach for Bukovyna Chernivtsi. He joined Bukovyna's senior team coaching staff as the team's physical trainer in 2024.

== Honors ==
Bukovyna Chernivtsi

- Ukrainian Second League Group A: 2009–10

Desna Chernihiv

- Ukrainian Second League Group A: 2005–06

FC Vorkuta

- CSL Championship: 2018
- Canadian Soccer League First Division: 2017
