= Yaroslav Svorak =

Ukrainian footballer

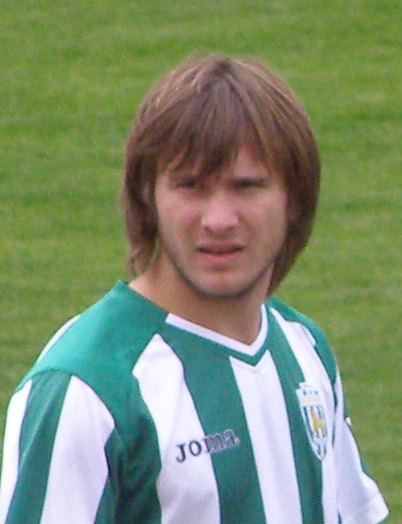
- Svorak in 2009

Personal information
- Full name: Yaroslav Lyubomyrovych Svorak
- Date of birth: 7 February 1989 (age 37)
- Place of birth: Ternopil, Ukrainian SSR
- Height: 1.79 m (5 ft 10 in)
- Position: Forward

Youth career
- 2002–2006: Volyn Lutsk

Senior career*
Years	Team	Apps	(Gls)
2005–2006	Volyn Lutsk	13	(1)
2007–2011	Karpaty Lviv	4	(0)
2007–2008	→ Karpaty-2 Lviv	5	(1)
2011	→ Dnepr Mogilev (loan)	15	(3)
2011	→ Krymteplytsia Molodizhne (loan)	9	(0)
2012	Slavia Mozyr	3	(0)
2014–2016	Nyva Ternopil	30	(0)
2017	Vorkuta	11	(4)
2017	→ Vorkuta B (loan)	7	(2)

International career
2005	Ukraine U16	1	(0)
2007	Ukraine U18	5	(0)
2007–2008	Ukraine U19	16	(1)
- * Club domestic league appearances and goals

Yaroslav Svorak (Ukrainian: Ярослав Любомирович Сворак; born 7 February 1989) is a Ukrainian former professional footballer who played as a forward.

== Club career ==
=== Early career ===
Svorak was a product of the Volyn Lutsk School System and would ultimately sign with the senior team. He debuted with the Volyn senior team during the 2006-07 season in the Ukrainian First League. During his tenure with Volyn, he debuted in the Ukrainian Cup against Naftovyk Dolyna. For the remainder of the season, he signed with Karpaty Lviv. In his first season in Lviv, he played in 4 matches in the Ukrainian Premier League. The following season, he played with Karpaty Lviv reserve team in the Ukrainian Second League.

In the spring of 2011, Lviv loaned Svorak abroad to the Belarusian Premier League to play with Dnepr Mogilev. Midway through the season, he left Belarus over financial difficulties with the club. Throughout the 2011 campaign, he played in 15 matches and recorded 3 goals.

Following his departure from Belarus, he returned to the Ukrainian second division to play with Crimean side Krymteplytsia Molodizhne.

=== Belarus ===
In the spring of 2012, he returned to the Belarusian circuit to play with Slavia Mozyr. In his debut season with Slavia, he appeared in 3 matches and helped the team finish tenth. Despite being injured for the majority of the previous season, the club announced his return in 2013.

=== Nyva Ternopil ===
After his short stint in Belarus, he returned to his country's second-tier league by signing a contract with Nyva Ternopil. He would re-sign with Ternopil for another season. Svorak would leave Ternopil midway through the season as the club withdrew from the league. After his release from Ternopil, he was linked to a possible move to Hirnyk-Sport Komsomolsk. In his final season with the club, he appeared in 20 matches and recorded 3 goals.

=== Canada ===
In 2017, Svorak had another stint abroad in the Canadian Soccer League's first division with Vorkuta. Svorak would help the club secure the divisional title in their debut season. Vorkuta's playoff run would conclude in the semi-final round after a defeat to Scarborough SC. He also played with Vorkuta's reserve team in the league's second division playoff quarterfinal round, where he contributed a goal against SC Waterloo Region's reserve team. The reserve team would be eliminated from the tournament the following round by Burlington SC.

== International career ==
Svorak has represented several of the Ukrainian national youth teams.

== Personal life ==
Svorak and his wife both starred in a music video by a band named Red Sofa in 2015.

== Honors ==
FC Vorkuta

- Canadian Soccer League First Division: 2017
