= Goran Švonja =

Serbian footballer

Personal information
- Date of birth: 12 July 1990 (age 36)
- Place of birth: Novi Sad, SFR Yugoslavia
- Position: Defender

Senior career*
Years	Team	Apps	(Gls)
2008–2012	Veternik		
2012–2016	Proleter Novi Sad	78	(8)
2016–2020	Serbian White Eagles		
2021–2026	Veternik		
- * Club domestic league appearances and goals

Goran Švonja (Serbian Cyrillic: Горан Швоња; born 12 July 1990) is a Serbian footballer who played as a defender.

== Career ==
=== Early career ===
Švonja began his career in 2008 with Veternik in the Vojvodina League West. In his debut season, he helped the club achieve promotion to the Serbian League Vojvodina by winning the league title. In 2012, he was signed by Proleter Novi Sad in the Serbian First League. He re-signed with the club in 2014. His final season with Proleter was in the 2015-16 season. Švonja received a trial with Vojvodina in January 2016. After four seasons in the Serbian second division, he left Proleter in 2016 to pursue his career in Canada.

=== Canada ===
In the summer of 2016, he played abroad in the Canadian Soccer League with the Serbian White Eagles. Švonja assisted the club in securing a playoff berth where the Serbs defeated Toronto Atomic in the opening round. The Serbs qualified for the championship final match by defeating FC Ukraine United in the semifinal. He appeared in the championship match where Toronto won the title by defeating Hamilton City.

He re-signed with Serbia the following season. He helped the Serbs secure a playoff berth by finishing second in the league's first division. In the preliminary round of the postseason, Toronto defeated SC Waterloo Region. The York Region Shooters would eliminate Serbia in the following round. His final season in the Canadian circuit was in the 2020 season. He helped Serbia qualify for the postseason, where Vorkuta defeated them in the first round.

=== Serbia ===
After several seasons in Canada, he returned to his former club Veternik in 2021. In 2024, he was named the team captain and helped the club reach the Novi Sad Football Cup finals.

== Honours ==
FK Veternik

- Vojvodina League West: 2008–09

Serbian White Eagles

- CSL Championship: 2016
