= Radenko Kamberović =

Serbian footballer (born 1983)

Personal information
- Full name: Radenko Kamberović
- Date of birth: 13 February 1983 (age 43)
- Place of birth: Bajina Bašta, SFR Yugoslavia
- Height: 1.76 m (5 ft 9 in)
- Position: Right-back

Senior career*
Years	Team	Apps	(Gls)
2001–2002	Remont Čačak	24	(0)
2003–2005	OFK Beograd	1	(0)
2004	→ Mačva Šabac (loan)	11	(0)
2005	→ BASK (loan)	3	(0)
2005–2006	Sloga Bajina Bašta		
2006	→ Sevojno (loan)	8	(0)
2006–2009	Sevojno	93	(7)
2010–2011	Partizan	3	(0)
2010–2011	→ Borac Čačak (loan)	17	(0)
2012–2013	Budućnost Podgorica	43	(0)
2013	Jedinstvo Užice	5	(0)
2014	Sloga Kraljevo	2	(0)
2015–2020	Serbian White Eagles		
- * Club domestic league appearances and goals as of 10 November 2016

Radenko Kamberović (Serbian Cyrillic: Раденко Камберовић; born 13 February 1983) is a Serbian former professional footballer who played as a defender.

== Club career ==
=== Early career ===
Kamberović began his career in 2001 in the Second League of FR Yugoslavia with Remont Čačak. In 2003, he played in the First League of FR Yugoslavia with OFK Beograd. During his time with Beograd he was loaned out to Mačva Šabac, and BASK. After a loan spell with Sevojno, he officially signed with the club in 2006 and played in the Serbian First League.

In the 2008-09 season, he helped Sevojno reach the finals of the Serbian Cup which qualified them for the 2009–10 UEFA Europa League. Throughout the tournament, he featured in the matches against FBK Kaunas, and Lille.

=== SuperLiga ===
In 2010, he joined FK Partizan in the Serbian SuperLiga on a four year contract. During his tenure with Partizan, he saw limited action and was loaned to league rivals Borac Cacak.

=== Montenegro ===
After the Serbian league concluded, Kamberović went across the border to play in the Montenegrin First League with Budućnost Podgorica. In his debut season in the Montenegrin circuit, he helped the club secure the league title. Podgorica's title victory qualified the team for the 2012–13 UEFA Champions League where Kamberović participated in the matches against Polish side Śląsk Wrocław, In his final season with Podgorica, he won the 2012–13 Montenegrin Cup where they defeated Čelik Nikšić.

=== Serbia ===
After two seasons in the Montenegrin top tier, he returned to Serbian second division to play with Jedinstvo Užice. The following season marked his final season in the Serbian circuit as he played with Sloga Kraljevo.

=== Canada ===
In late 2015, Kamberović joined the Southern Ontario-based Canadian Soccer League to play with the Serbian White Eagles. He assisted the club in securing the league's first division title and a playoff berth. The Serbs defeated London City in the playoff preliminary round. Their playoff journey concluded in the following round after a defeat by SC Waterloo Region.

Kamberović re-signed with the Toronto-based team for the 2016 season. In his second season, he helped the Serbs secure another playoff berth. Serbia defeated Toronto Atomic in the first round of the postseason tournament. Their opponents in the next round were FC Ukraine United where they successfully advanced to the championship finals. Kamberović participated in the finals where they defeated Hamilton City for the title.

He returned for his third season in 2017. Throughout the regular season, he helped Serbia qualify for the playoffs by finishing second in the division. In the preliminary round of the postseason, Toronto defeated Waterloo. The York Region Shooters would eliminate Serbia in the semifinal round. In the 2018 season, he helped Serbia secure a playoff berth. His final season in the Canadian circuit was in the 2020 season. He helped Serbia qualify for the postseason where Vorkuta defeated them in the first round.

== Honours ==
Sevojno

- Serbian Cup: Runner-up 2008–09

Partizan

- Serbian SuperLiga: 2009–10

Budućnost Podgorica

- Montenegrin First League: 2011–12
- Montenegrin Cup: 2012–13

Serbian White Eagles

- CSL Championship: 2016
- Canadian Soccer League First Division: 2015
