= Oleg Shutov =

Ukrainian footballer

Personal information
- Full name: Oleg Shutov
- Date of birth: July 9, 1988 (age 38)
- Place of birth: Zhdanov, Ukraine SSR, Soviet Union
- Position: Midfielder

Senior career*
Years	Team	Apps	(Gls)
2006–2015	Dniprodzerzhynsk/Kamianske	217	(13)
2015–2016	Veres Rivne	12	(1)
2016	Ukraine United	21	(3)
2017	Vorkuta	13	(5)
- * Club domestic league appearances and goals

Oleg Shutov (Ukrainian:Олег В'ячеславович Шутов; born August 9, 1988) is a Ukrainian former footballer who played as a midfielder.

== Club career ==
=== Ukraine ===
Shutov began playing at the academy level with Illichivets Mariupol's youth system. He secured his first professional contract with Stal Dniprodzerzhynsk in the 2006-07 season. His debut for the club was against CSKA Kiev in a Ukrainian First League match. Shutov would participate in the 2006–07 Ukrainian Cup, where he helped the club reach the quarterfinals and was eliminated by Tavriya Simferopol. In his debut season in the professional ranks, he appeared in 32 matches and recorded 2 goals. Shutov would be named the club's top player during the 2007-08 season. He re-signed with the club for his fourth season in 2010.

After several seasons in the Ukrainian third-tier league, he helped Stal secure a promotion during the 2013-14 season. Throughout the club's promotional season, he served as the team captain. In his return season in the second division, he appeared in 22 matches.

After helping Kamianske secure a promotion to the top division, he returned to the country's third division to secure a deal with Veres Rivne. Before he signed with Veres, he had a trial with Bukovyna Chernivtsi. His tenure with Veres was short-lived, as he left the club after one season. In total, he played in 13 matches and scored 1 goal.

=== Canada ===
He was linked to possibly playing abroad in Canada after he departed from Veres. Ultimately, he secured a contract with Ukraine United in the Canadian Soccer League's first division. In his debut season with the Toronto-based club, he helped the team secure a playoff berth by finishing second in the division. Shutov would record a goal in the first round of the playoffs against the Brantford Galaxy, which helped the club advance. Their playoff journey would conclude in the next round as the Serbian White Eagles eliminated them from the playoffs.

After the relegation of Ukraine United to the league's second division, he signed with expansion franchise Vorkuta for the 2017 season. Throughout the season, he assisted the club in securing the divisional title. He contributed a goal in the quarterfinal round of the playoffs that helped advance the club to the next round. Vorkuta would be eliminated from the tournament in the following round by Scarborough SC. After the conclusion of the season, he left the club.

== Honors ==
FC Vorkuta

- Canadian Soccer League First Division: 2017
