= Vitomir Jelić =

Serbian footballer (born 1982)

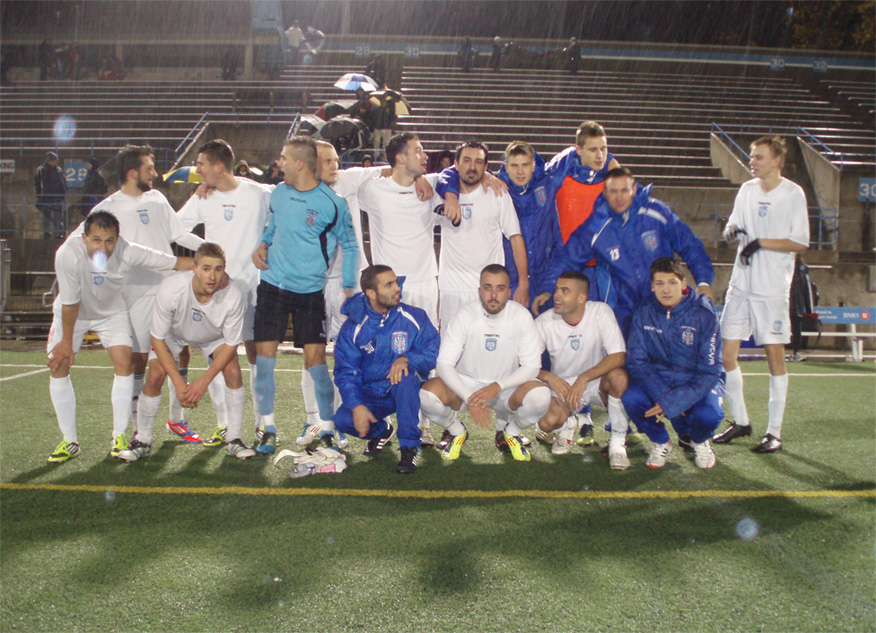
- Jelić in 2012

Personal information
- Full name: Vitomir Jelić
- Date of birth: January 21, 1982 (age 44)
- Place of birth: Čačak, SFR Yugoslavia
- Height: 1.82 m (6 ft 0 in)
- Position: Defender

Senior career*
Years	Team	Apps	(Gls)
2001–2002	Polet Ljubić	49	(1)
2002–2004	Borac Čačak	26	(0)
2003–2004	→ Remont Čačak (loan)		
2004–2005	Mladost Lučani		
2005	Borac Čačak	1	(0)
2005–2007	Žepče	22	(0)
2007	→ Polet Ljubić (loan)		
2008	Jedinstvo Bijelo Polje		
2008–2009	Karviná	13	(0)
2009	Radnički Kragujevac		
2010–2012	Zeyar Shwe Myay		
2012–2020	Serbian White Eagles		
- * Club domestic league appearances and goals

Vitomir Jelić (Serbian Cyrillic: Витомир Јелић; born January 21, 1982) is a Serbian retired footballer who played as a defender.

== Club career ==
=== Early career ===
Jelić began his career in 2001 in the Second League of FR Yugoslavia with FK Polet Ljubić. After several years in the second league he achieved promotion to the First League of FR Yugoslavia in 2003 with Borac Cacak. He would later have stints with FK Remont Čačak, and Mladost Lucani, before returning to Borac in 2005. In 2005, he went across the border to Bosnia to play with NK Žepče in the Premier League of Bosnia and Herzegovina. He later played in the Czech National Football League with MFK Karviná in 2008. Jelić left the Czech circuit after one season.

In early 2009, he played with FK Radnički 1923.

=== Asia ===
After several years on the European continent, Jelić would play several seasons in Asia with Zeyar Shwe Myay in the Myanmar National League. In the winter of 2011, he returned to Europe where he received a trial with Albanian side Vllaznia Shkodër.

=== Canada ===
In 2012, he ventured abroad to play in the interprovincial Canadian Soccer League with the Serbian White Eagles. Jelić would assist the Western Toronto side by securing a playoff berth by finishing seventh in the league's first division. In the quarterfinal round of the postseason, the Serbs defeated divisional champions SC Toronto.

The following season he re-signed with Serbia. In his sophomore year with the White Eagles, he helped clinch another playoff berth by securing the final berth. Toronto's playoff journey concluded in the opening round after a loss to Kingston FC. The Serbs secured Jelić for the 2014 season. Jelić helped Serbia qualify for the playoffs for the third consecutive season. Serbia experienced another early elimination from the playoffs by Kingston.

In his fourth season with the Toronto-based club, he assisted the club in winning the divisional title. However, their playoff run ended in the second round after a defeat by SC Waterloo Region. The 2016 season marked his fifth season with the organization. He helped Serbia qualify for the playoffs by finishing fourth in the standings. In the preliminary round of the postseason, the Serbs defeated Toronto Atomic. Their opponents in the next round were FC Ukraine United where they successfully advanced to the championship final. Jelić would appear in the championship where the Serbs defeated Hamilton City. His final season with the White Eagles was in 2020.

== Honours ==
Serbian White Eagles

- CSL Championship: 2016
- Canadian Soccer League First Division: 2015
