= Milan Mijailović =

Serbian footballer

Personal information
- Full name: Milan Mijailović
- Date of birth: 18 September 1981 (age 45)
- Place of birth: Gornji Milanovac, SFR Yugoslavia
- Height: 1.84 m (6 ft 0 in)
- Position: Centre forward

Senior career*
Years	Team	Apps	(Gls)
1997–2001	Borac Čačak	43	(20)
2001–2005	Hajduk Kula	46	(11)
2004	→ Borac Čačak (loan)		
2005–2006	Radnički Pirot		
2006–2008	Mladost Lučani	41	(5)
2008	Jagodina	11	(0)
2009	Metalac Gornji Milanovac	13	(2)
2010	Sloga Kraljevo	17	(7)
2010	OPS	5	(3)
2010–2011	Sloga Kraljevo		
2011–2012	Polet Ljubić		
2012–2013	Kovačevac		

Managerial career
- 2017–2018: Serbian White Eagles
- 2017–2018: Serbia AC (indoor)
- * Club domestic league appearances and goals as of 26 October 2017

Milan Mijailović (Serbian Cyrillic: Милан Мијаиловић; born 18 September 1981) is a Serbian retired football forward and current coach.

== Club career ==
=== Early career ===
Mijailović began playing in the First League of FR Yugoslavia in 1997 with Borac Čačak. In 2001, he played with league rivals Hajduk Kula and would also have a loan spell with his former club Borac Čačak in 2004.

He played in the Serbian First League in 2005–06 with Radnički Pirot. In 2007–08, he played in the Serbian SuperLiga with FK Mladost Lučani, and with FK Jagodina the following season. In 2009, he played with his hometown club Metalac Gornji Milanovac in the first division where he appeared in 6 matches.

In 2010, he returned to the Serbian second division on a loan spell to Sloga Kraljevo where he appeared in 17 matches and scored 7 goals.

=== Europe ===
After several years in his native Serbia, he ventured abroad in the summer of 2010 to Finland's Ykkönen side Oulun Palloseura. He recorded his first two goals for the club on August 21, 2010, against Mikkelin Palloilijat. After three months in the Finnish circuit, his contract was terminated in September 2010. He appeared in 5 matches and scored 3 goals.

=== Serbia ===
After a season abroad he returned to play with FK Sloga, and later with FK Polet Ljubić. In 2012, he played in the Serbian League Belgrade with FK Kovačevac.

== Managerial career ==
He was a football coach for FK Takovo and youth teams for FK Metalac Gornji Milanovac.

In the summer of 2017, he began managing in the Canadian Soccer League with the Serbian White Eagles. Mijailović would lead the western Toronto side to a playoff berth by finishing second in the league's first division. The Serbs would defeat SC Waterloo Region in a penalty shootout in the opening round of the playoffs. Their playoff run would conclude in the next round after a defeat by the York Region Shooters.

During the winter season, he would manage the Serbia indoor team in the Arena Premier League for the 2017–18 season. He returned for the 2018 summer season. For the second consecutive season, he helped Serbia secure a postseason berth. Serbia would be eliminated from the playoffs in the first round by Waterloo.
