= Zoran Pešić (footballer, born 1983) =

Serbian footballer

Personal information
- Date of birth: 25 September 1983 (age 43)
- Place of birth: Raška, SFR Yugoslavia
- Height: 1.88 m (6 ft 2 in)
- Position: Centre-back

Senior career*
Years	Team	Apps	(Gls)
2001–2003	Bane	15	(0)
2004–2005	Javor Ivanjica	3	(0)
2005–2006	Vujić Valjevo	45	(2)
2007	Budućnost Valjevo	12	(2)
2007	Radnik Bijeljina		
2008	Vlasina	14	(5)
2008–2009	ČSK Čelarevo	14	(0)
2009	→ Novi Sad (loan)	16	(4)
2009–2010	Spartak Subotica	6	(0)
2010–2011	Banat Zrenjanin	32	(1)
2012–2013	Radnički Niš	16	(3)
2013	Novi Pazar	1	(0)
2013	Radnik Surdulica	9	(0)
2014	Erchim		
2014–2015	OFK Bačka	7	(0)
2015	Burlington SC		
2015	London City SC		
2017–2020	Serbian White Eagles		
- * Club domestic league appearances and goals

Zoran Pešić (Serbian Cyrillic: Зоран Пешић; born 25 September 1983) is a Serbian retired football defender.

== Career ==
=== Early career ===
Pešić began his career in 2001 with FK Bane in the Second League of FR Yugoslavia. He later played in the Serbian First League with Javor Ivanjica, Budućnost Valjevo, Radnik Bijeljina, Vlasina, ČSK Čelarevo, and Novi Sad.

=== Serbian SuperLiga ===
In 2009, Pešić played in the Serbian SuperLiga with Spartak Subotica. In his debut season with Spartak, he appeared in six matches. Following his brief stint in the Serbian top tier, he returned to the second division to play with Banat Zrenjanin.

He remained in the second-tier league for the 2011–12 season by securing a contract with Radnički Niš. In his debut season with the club, he helped secure promotion to the country's major league by winning the league title. Pešić re-signed with Radnički in their run in the first division. His tenure with Radnički in the top flight was short-lived as he was transferred to Novi Pazar. After a season in the SuperLiga, he had another run in the country's second division with Radnik Surdulica.

=== Mongolia ===
In 2014, Pešić played abroad in the Mongolian National Premier League with Erchim. Throughout his stint in Mongolia, he played in the 2014 AFC President's Cup against the likes of Manang Marshyangdi and Svay Rieng. He also helped Erchim secure the regular season title and clinch a playoff berth. In the playoff stage, the club was defeated in the finals by Khoromkhon.

Following his spell in Eastern Asia, he returned to the Serbian second division to play with OFK Bačka for the 2014–15 campaign. In total, he appeared in seven matches for the club.

=== Canada ===
In the summer of 2015, Pešić played abroad in the Canadian Soccer League, initially with Burlington SC. For the later portion of the season, he was transferred to London City. In his debut season in the southern Ontario circuit, he helped London secure the final playoff berth in the first division. London was eliminated from the postseason tournament by the Serbian White Eagles in the opening round.

In 2017, he signed with league rivals, the Serbian White Eagles. Pešić would assist the club in clinching a postseason berth by finishing second in the league's top division. The Serbs defeated SC Waterloo Region in the preliminary round. Ultimately, the York Region Shooters eliminated the western Toronto side in the semifinal round.

He re-signed with the Serbs for the 2018 season. Once again, he assisted the club in securing a playoff berth, and he contributed a goal against SC Waterloo. He would return for his third season with the organization in 2019. Throughout the 2019 campaign, the White Eagles qualified for the playoffs but were once more eliminated in the quarterfinal round in a penalty shootout by SC Waterloo. The 2020 season marked his final stint with the western Toronto side. FC Vorkuta eliminated the Serbs in the playoff quarterfinals.

== Honors ==
Radnički Niš

- Serbian First League: 2011–12

Erchim

- Mongolian Premier League Regular Season: 2014
- MFF Super Cup: 2014
