= Ivan Stanković (footballer, born 1983) =

Serbian footballer

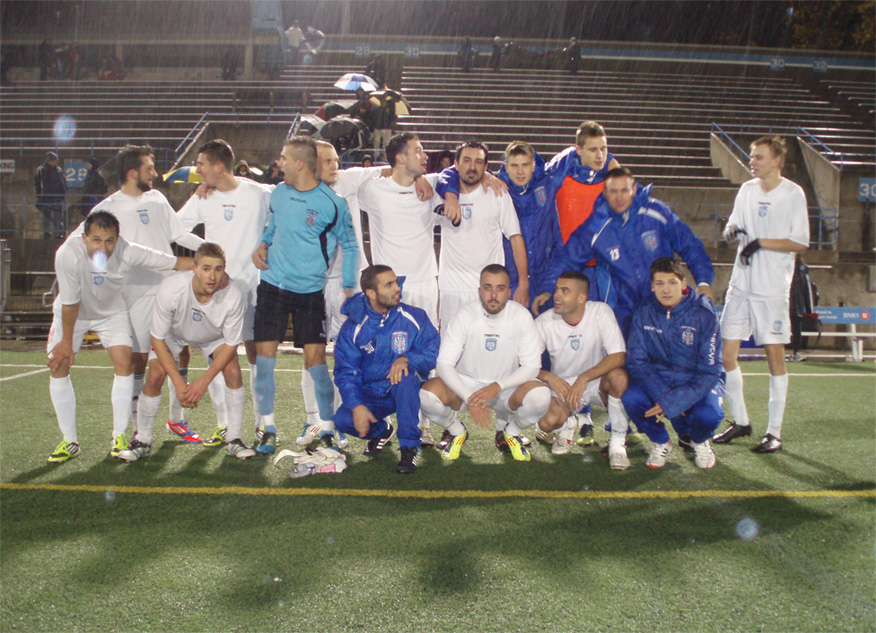
- Stanković in 2012

Personal information
- Full name: Ivan Stanković
- Date of birth: 1 March 1983 (age 43)
- Place of birth: Kragujevac, SFR Yugoslavia
- Height: 1.83 m (6 ft 0 in)
- Position: Midfielder

Senior career*
Years	Team	Apps	(Gls)
2001–2003	Teleoptik	28	(5)
2003–2004	Proleter Zrenjanin	26	(6)
2004–2005	Partizan	0	(0)
2005–2006	Obilić	22	(2)
2006–2007	BASK	2	(0)
2007–2008	Mladost Apatin	3	(0)
2008	Škendija		
2008–2009	1. HFC Humenné		
2009	Slavija Kragujevac		
2009–2010	Bežanija	10	(0)
2010–2011	Radnički Obrenovac	24	(5)
2011–2012	Kirkop United		
2012–2020	Serbian White Eagles		
- * Club domestic league appearances and goals

Ivan Stanković (Serbian Cyrillic: Иван Станковић; born 1 March 1983) is a Serbian footballer.

== Playing career ==
Stanković began his career in 2001 with FK Teleoptik in the Second League of FR Yugoslavia. In 2003, he played in the Serbian League with FK Proleter Zrenjanin. The following season he played in the First League of FR Yugoslavia with Partizan Belgrade FC. He signed with rivals FK Obilić for the 2005 season. After his stint in the top flight he played in the Serbian First League with FK BASK, and FK Mladost Apatin.

In 2008, he went abroad to play in the Macedonian Second Football League with KF Shkëndija. Following his time in Macedonia he signed with ŠK Futura Humenné. After a year abroad he returned to Serbia to play with FK Slavija Kragujevac, FK Bežanija, and FK Radnički Obrenovac. In 2012, he went overseas to play in the Canadian Soccer League with the Serbian White Eagles FC.
