= 2017 Canadian Soccer League season =

Professional soccer league season

Canadian Soccer League First Division
- Season: 2017
- Dates: May 26 – September 10 (regular season); September 15 – September 30 (playoffs)
- Champions: FC Vorkuta (First Division regular season); York Region Shooters (First Division playoffs, 3rd title)
- Matches: 56
- Goals: 241 (4.3 per match)
- Top goalscorer: Aleksandar Stojiljković (17)
- Biggest home win: Serbian White Eagles 8–1 Milton SC (August 18)
- Biggest away win: Milton SC 1–7 York Region Shooters (July 30); Milton SC 1–7 Royal Toronto FC (August 4); Brantford Galaxy 2–7 FC Vorkuta (August 26); Brantford Galaxy 0–7 FC Vorkuta (August 30)
- Longest winning run: 5 matches FC Vorkuta
- Longest unbeaten run: 12 matches Serbian White Eagles

The 2017 Canadian Soccer League season (known as the Givova Canadian Soccer League for sponsorship reasons) was the 20th season under the Canadian Soccer League name. The season began on May 26, 2017, and concluded on September 30, 2017, with the CSL Championship final.

The season saw the York Region Shooters claim their third CSL Championship by defeating Scarborough SC in a penalty shootout. In the Second Division, FC Ukraine United went home with their first CSL double after defeating Burlington SC in the finals. FC Ukraine became the second club in the Second Division after TFC Academy II in 2012 to go undefeated the entire regular season. While FC Vorkuta became the second expansion franchise in CSL history since the Ottawa Wizards in the 2001 season to claim the title in their debut season.

== Summary ==
=== First Division title race ===
The 2017 season was a highly competitive campaign, particularly in the First Division. The title was heavily contested between FC Vorkuta, Serbian White Eagles, and York Region Shooters. The outcome was determined on the final week of the regular season with Vorkuta claiming their first division title. The divisional champions were an expansion franchise with a noted history at the amateur level around the York Region.

Vorkuta relied on the Ukrainian soccer market for player recruitment and hired the services of Serhiy Zayets as head coach. Another source of talent acquisition came from FC Ukraine United's decision to relegate to the Second Division which allowed Vorkuta to acquire Ukraine United's key players. The club's foray into the professional scene was instantly felt as they managed to obtain the first position in the first two weeks. The majority of the season they were situated in the top three and produced an eight-game undefeated streak. They ultimately secured the title in the final two weeks and reached the second stage of the postseason.

The Serbian White Eagles entered the season as the defending champions with general manager Uroš Stamatović originally returning to manage the squad. Serbia retained their seasoned imports from Europe, while also rejuvenating the roster with graduates from their youth system. Their on-field performance prospered as the White Eagles began the season with a 12-game undefeated streak. Their only defeat occurred in an away match while at home they remained undefeated and held the first position for seven consecutive weeks. A defeat to York Region dropped the Serbs to third and concluded as runners up to Vorkuta by a single point. Unfortunately, they failed to defend their championship after being eliminated by York Region in the semifinals.

York Region Shooters were consistent challengers for the divisional title. The Vaughan-based team preserved their veteran roster and continued their practice of acquiring additional talent from the Caribbean soccer market. They managed to hold the first position for three different occasions and held the third spot for the majority of the season. York Region continued their reputation as a solid defensive team and as a result, secured the best defensive record. The Shooters were undefeated on the road and eventually finished third in the standings just two points away from the division title. In the postseason the Shooters secured their third CSL Championship.

=== Midtable contenders ===
The fourth position was secured by Scarborough SC as the eastern Toronto club developed into an elite team. Preparations for the season included the recruitment of Krum Bibishkov as a player-coach. Scarborough added more depth to their roster by attracting further overseas talent. The team achieved a five-game undefeated streak towards the conclusion of the season and finished in the top four in best offensive and defensive records. In the postseason Scarborough reached the championship final for the first time in its history.

Brantford Galaxy secured a postseason berth by finishing fifth in the standings. The Galaxy primarily battled with Scarborough and fluctuated between the fourth and fifth positions. Saša Vuković was the change in the managerial structure and took the team to the first round of the playoffs.

=== Other teams ===
The bottom section of the division featured Milton SC, Royal Toronto FC, and SC Waterloo Region. After competing in the second division for the 2016 season Waterloo returned to the First division with former player Stefan Ristic managing the team. The club produced a mediocre season by finishing in seventh place tied with Milton in points only separated by a lower goal difference.

Royal Toronto FC an academy operated by former players Dario Brezak and Luka Majstorovic was granted a franchise in the league. The expansion franchise failed to produce sufficient results and finished at the bottom of the standings.

=== Second Division ===
FC Ukraine United decided to relegate themselves to the Second division for the 2017 season. The club continued in attracting seasoned imports from the Ukrainian soccer market and as result achieved a club milestone by producing their first perfect season in the league. The division witnessed the return of Burlington SC where they finished as runners up in the division and faced Ukraine United in the DII Championship final.

== First Division ==
=== Changes from 2016 ===
Since 2014 season the First Division has continued to be primarily based in the Greater Toronto Area, as Hamilton City and Toronto Atomic FC both failed to renew their membership for the 2017 season. The additions of FC Vorkuta and Royal Toronto FC were brought in as expansions. While SC Waterloo Region was promoted to the First Division to bring the division back to 8 teams. While the Second Division saw an increase to 8 teams with the return of Burlington SC and the relegation of FC Ukraine United.

=== Teams ===
Team	City	Stadium	Manager
Brantford Galaxy	Brantford, Ontario	Steve Brown Sports Complex	Saša Vuković
FC Vorkuta	North York, Toronto	Esther Shiner Stadium	Serhiy Zayets
Milton SC	Milton, Ontario	Jean Vanier Stadium	Jasmin Halkic
Royal Toronto FC	Toronto, Ontario	Varsity Stadium	Luka Majstorovic
Scarborough SC	Scarborough, Toronto, Ontario	Birchmount Stadium	Krum Bibishkov
Serbian White Eagles	Etobicoke, Toronto	Centennial Park Stadium	Milan Mijailović
SC Waterloo Region	Waterloo, Ontario	RIM Park	Stefan Ristic
York Region Shooters	Maple, Vaughan	Joan of Arc Turf Field	Tony De Thomasis

==== Coaching changes ====
Team	Outgoing coach	Manner of departure	Date of vacancy	Position in table	Incoming coach	Date of appointment
Serbian White Eagles	(Serbia) Uroš Stamatović	Resigned	July 7, 2017	1st in July	(Serbia) Branislav Vukomanović (interim)	July 7, 2017
Serbian White Eagles	(Serbia) Branislav Vukomanović (interim)	end of interim period	September 2017	2nd in September	(Serbia) Milan Mijailović	September 2017

Location of First Division teams outside of Toronto for the 2017 CSL season.
First Division
Location of First Division teams in Toronto for the 2017 CSL season.
First Division

=== Standings ===
Pos	Team	Pld	W	D	L	GF	GA	GD	Pts	Qualification
1	FC Vorkuta (C)	14	10	2	2	43	13	+30	32	Playoffs
2	Serbian White Eagles	14	9	4	1	38	14	+24	31	Playoffs
3	York Region Shooters (O)	14	9	3	2	34	7	+27	30	Playoffs
4	Scarborough SC	14	7	3	4	37	17	+20	24	Playoffs
5	Brantford Galaxy	14	6	0	8	26	37	−11	18	Playoffs
6	Milton SC	14	2	2	10	24	75	−51	8	Playoffs
7	SC Waterloo Region	14	1	5	8	19	33	−14	8	Playoffs
8	Royal Toronto FC	14	1	3	10	20	45	−25	6	Playoffs

Updated to match(es) played on September 11, 2017. Source: []
Rules for classification: 1) points; 2) goal difference; 3) number of goals scored.
(C) Champions; (O) Play-off winners

=== Positions by round ===
Team ╲ Round	1	2	3	4	5	6	7	8	9	10	11	12	13	14	15	16
Brantford Galaxy	2	4	5	5	4	4	4	4	4	4	4	5	4	4	5	5
FC Vorkuta	1	1	2	2	1	1	2	2	2	2	3	3	3	2	1	1
Milton SC	8	8	8	8	8	8	8	8	8	8	8	8	8	6	6	6
Royal Toronto FC	7	7	7	7	7	7	7	7	7	7	7	7	7	8	8	8
Scarborough SC	4	6	4	4	5	5	5	5	5	5	5	4	5	5	4	4
SC Waterloo Region	3	5	6	6	4	6	6	6	6	6	6	6	6	7	7	7
Serbian White Eagles	5	3	3	3	2	2	1	1	1	1	1	1	1	3	2	2
York Region Shooters	6	2	1	1	3	3	3	3	3	3	2	2	2	1	3	3

=== Season Statistics ===
==== Goals ====
Rank	Player	Club	Goals
1	(Serbia) Aleksandar Stojiljković	Scarborough SC	17
2	(Ukraine) Serhiy Ivlyev	FC Vorkuta	13
3	(United States) Evan Beutler	York Region Shooters	7
4	(Canada) Miroslav Čabrilo	Brantford Galaxy	6
4	(Canada) Scott Damion Tristan	Milton SC	6
4	(Bulgaria) Kiril Dimitrov	Scarborough SC	6
4	(Serbia) Đorđe Jočić	Serbian White Eagles	6
4	(Serbia) Miroslav Jovanović	Serbian White Eagles	6
4	(Serbia) Branislav Vukomanović	Serbian White Eagles	6
5	(Bulgaria) Krum Bibishkov	Scarborough SC	5
5	(Jamaica) Kavin Bryan	York Region Shooters	5
5	(Ukraine) Oleg Shutov	FC Vorkuta	5

Updated: September 11, 2017
Source: http://canadiansoccerleague.ca/2017-first-division-stats/

==== Hat-tricks ====
Player	Club	Against	Result	Date
(Ukraine) Serhiy Ivlyev	FC Vorkuta	Royal Toronto FC	5–1 (H)	17 June 2017
Alton Ellis	York Region Shooters	Milton SC	1–7 (A)	30 July 2017
Scott Damion Tristan	Milton SC	SC Waterloo Region	4–3 (H)	6 August 2017
(United States) Evan Beutler	York Region Shooters	Royal Toronto FC	5–0 (H)	18 August 2017
(Serbia) Aleksandar Stojiljković	Scarborough SC	Royal Toronto FC	3–3 (A)	27 August 2017
(Serbia) Aleksandar Stojiljković	Scarborough SC	Milton SC	7–0 (H)	2 September 2017
(Serbia) Aleksandar Stojiljković	Scarborough SC	Brantford Galaxy	5–0 (H)	8 September 2017

=== Playoffs ===
==== Quarterfinals ====
September 15, 2017	Serbian White Eagles	5–3 (a.e.t.)	SC Waterloo Region	Toronto, Ontario
19:00	Ivan Nikolic 5'; Luka Bojić 58'; Vukomanović 87'; Miroslav Jovanović 101' 114'	Report	Glavina 27', 45'; Bailey 70'	Stadium: Centennial Park Stadium; Attendance: 150; Referee: Tony Amaral

September 16, 2017	FC Vorkuta	6–3	Royal Toronto FC	Vaughan, Ontario
20:00	Kerchu; Ivlyev; Shutov; Rudyi	Report	Dario Brezak; Adrian Bembridge	Stadium: Ontario Soccer Centre; Referee: Marco Jaramillo

September 16, 2017	Scarborough SC	6–2	Brantford Galaxy	Toronto, Ontario
20:00	Stojiljkovic	Report	Čabrilo	Stadium: Birchmount Stadium

September 17, 2017	York Region Shooters	3–0 (Note: York Region Shooters advanced to the semi-final as a result of a 3-0 forfeit)	Milton SC	Maple, Ontario
18:30		Report		Stadium: Joan of Arc Turf Field

==== Semifinals ====
September 22, 2017	Serbian White Eagles	1-2	York Region Shooters	Toronto, Ontario
19:00	Ivan Nikolic 35'	Report	Hassan Abdulmumini 22'; Bryan 52'	Stadium: Centennial Park Stadium; Attendance: 300; Referee: Marco Jaramillo

September 23, 2017	FC Vorkuta	0–1	Scarborough SC	Toronto, Ontario
18:00		Report	Fazlagić 21'	Stadium: Esther Shiner Stadium

==== CSL Championship ====
September 30, 2017	York Region Shooters	1–1 (a.e.t.) (5–4 p)	Scarborough SC	Toronto, Ontario
16:30	Beutler 51'	Report	Fazlagić 61'	Stadium: Lamport Stadium

== Second Division ==
Canadian Soccer League Second Division
- Season: 2017
- Champions: FC Ukraine United (Second Division regular season); FC Ukraine United (Second Division playoffs, 1st title)
- Matches: 56
- Goals: 290 (5.18 per match)
- Top goalscorer: Taras Hromyak (15)
- Biggest home win: FC Ukraine United 12–0 Serbian White Eagles B (June 18)
- Biggest away win: Royal Toronto FC B B 1–12 FC Ukraine United (July 8)
- Longest winning run: 7 matches FC Ukraine United
- Longest unbeaten run: 14 matches FC Ukraine United

=== Teams ===
The Second Division increased to include eight teams in total. Departing clubs included the disbandment of defending champions York Region Shooters B, Toronto Atomic FC B, and the promotion of SC Waterloo to the First Division. New entries included the return of Burlington SC, the relegation of FC Ukraine United, and the reserve squads of FC Vorkuta B, SC Waterloo B, and Royal Toronto FC B.

Team	City	Stadium	Manager
Brantford Galaxy B	Brantford, Ontario	Steve Brown Sports Complex	Tomo Dancetovic
Burlington SC	Burlington, Ontario	Nelson Stadium	Bruno Giannotti
FC Ukraine United	Toronto, Ontario	Centennial Park Stadium	Andrei Malychenkov
FC Vorkuta B	Thornhill, Ontario	St. Roberts S.S	
London City	London, Ontario	Hellenic Centre Stadium	Cedo Popovic
Royal Toronto FC B	Toronto, Ontario	Varsity Stadium	
SC Waterloo B	Waterloo, Ontario	RIM Park	
Serbian White Eagles B	Toronto, Ontario	Centennial Park Stadium	Milos Scepanovic

Location of Second Division teams outside of Toronto for the 2017 CSL season.
Second Division
Location of Second Division teams in Toronto for the 2017 CSL season.
Second Division

=== Standings ===
Pos	Team	Pld	W	D	L	GF	GA	GD	Pts	Qualification
1	FC Ukraine United (C, O)	14	13	1	0	75	10	+65	40	Playoffs
2	Burlington SC	14	10	1	3	44	18	+26	31	Playoffs
3	FC Vorkuta B	14	8	0	6	41	25	+16	24	Playoffs
4	Brantford Galaxy B	14	7	1	6	29	35	−6	22	Playoffs
5	Serbian White Eagles B	14	6	0	8	32	59	−27	18	Playoffs
6	SC Waterloo B	14	5	1	8	26	39	−13	16	Playoffs
7	Royal Toronto B	14	5	0	9	32	58	−26	15	Playoffs
8	London City SC	14	0	0	14	11	46	−35	0	

Updated to match(es) played on September 7, 2017. Source: canadiansoccerleague.ca
Rules for classification: 1) points; 2) goal difference; 3) number of goals scored.
(C) Champions; (O) Play-off winners

=== Season Statistics ===
==== Goals ====
Rank	Player	Club	Goals
1	(Ukraine) Taras Hromyak	FC Ukraine United	15
2	Jerry Gbodume	Royal Toronto FC B	7
2	(Jamaica) Amardo Oakley	Burlington SC	7
4	(Ukraine) Pavlo Lukyanets	FC Ukraine United	6
5	(Canada) Adriano Marques	Burlington SC	5
5	(Canada) Aleksander Mitic	SC Waterloo Region B	5
7	(Ukraine) Kiril Antonenko	FC Ukraine United	4
7	(Serbia) Vitomir Jelić	Serbian White Eagles B	4
7	(Ukraine) Oleksandr Lakusta	FC Vorkuta B	4
7	(Canada) Adam Villella	Brantford Galaxy B	4

Updated: September 7, 2017
Source: http://canadiansoccerleague.ca/2017-second-division-stats/

==== Hat-tricks ====
Player	Club	Against	Result	Date
(Ukraine) Pavlo Lukyanets	FC Ukraine United	Burlington SC	2–5 (A)	3 June 2017
(Ukraine) Kiril Antonenko	FC Ukraine United	Brantford Galaxy B	10–0 (H)	11 June 2017
(Ukraine) Taras Hromyak	FC Ukraine United	Serbian White Eagles B	12–0 (H)	18 June 2017
(Ukraine) Taras Hromyak	FC Ukraine United	Royal Toronto FC B	2–12 (A)	8 July 2017
(Ukraine) Pavlo Lukyanets	FC Ukraine United	Royal Toronto FC B	2–12 (A)	8 July 2017
(Ukraine) Taras Hromyak	FC Ukraine United	FC Vorkuta B	1–4 (A)	16 July 2017
(Ukraine) Taras Hromyak	FC Ukraine United	Brantford Galaxy B	1–5 (A)	29 July 2017
(Ukraine) Taras Hromyak	FC Ukraine United	Serbian White Eagles B	1–6 (A)	4 August 2017
(Ukraine) Sergiy Sergeyev	FC Ukraine United	SC Waterloo Region B	0–5 (A)	23 August 2017

=== Playoffs ===
==== Quarterfinals ====
September 16, 2017	Serbian White Eagles B	1–2	Brantford Galaxy B	Hamilton, Ontario
17:00		Report		Stadium: Serbian Community Centre

September 17, 2017	FC Vorkuta B	5–0	SC Waterloo B	Thornhill, Ontario
15:00	Svorak; Solonynko; Lakusta; Kris Kezic	Report		Stadium: St. Robert Catholic High School

September 17, 2017	Burlington SC	3–0	Royal Toronto FC B	Burlington, Ontario
		Report

==== Semifinals ====
September 24, 2017	Burlington SC	4-1	FC Vorkuta B	Burlington, Ontario
12:00		Report

September 24, 2017	FC Ukraine United	7–0	Brantford Galaxy B	Toronto, Ontario
15:00	Lukyanets; Falkovsky; Pitsur	Report		Stadium: Esther Shiner Stadium

==== Second Division Championship ====
September 30, 2017	FC Ukraine United	5-2	Burlington SC	Toronto, Ontario
14:00	Hromyak; Lukyanets; Pitsur; Falkovskyi	Report	Brandon Wellington; Oakley	Stadium: Lamport Stadium; Referee: Javier Prior
