= Đorđe Jocić =

Serbian footballer

Personal information
- Date of birth: 24 October 1991 (age 35)
- Place of birth: Belgrade, SFR Yugoslavia
- Height: 1.83 m (6 ft 0 in)
- Position: Midfielder

Youth career
- 2005–2009: Vojvodina

Senior career*
Years	Team	Apps	(Gls)
2009–2010	TuRU Düsseldorf		
2010–2012	RFK Novi Sad	11	(0)
2011–2012	Radnički Sombor	10	(1)
2013–2014	Pécs	1	(0)
2014–2015	FK Sumadinac		
2015–2016	Radnički Svilajnac		
2016–2020	Serbian White Eagles		
- * Club domestic league appearances and goals

Đorđe Jocić (Serbian Cyrillic: Ђорђе Јоцић; born 24 October 1991) is a Serbian former professional footballer who played as a midfielder.

== Career ==
=== Early career ===
Jocić played in the local German circuit during the 2009–10 season with TuRU Düsseldorf. Following his run in Germany, he returned to his native country to play in the Serbian second division with Novi Sad in 2010. In his debut season with Novi Sad, he appeared in eight matches. Jocić made his league cup debut in the Serbian Cup on 21 September 2011, against Javor Ivanjica. In the early winter of 2012, he was also invited for a trial with Spartak Subotica.

Jocić would play the remainder of the 2011–12 season with Radnički Sombor. In total, he played in 10 matches and scored 1 goal.

=== Hungary ===
Jocić ventured abroad to Hungary, where he received a trial with Pécsi in the summer of 2013. Ultimately, he signed a contract with the club to compete in the country's top-flight league. He made his league debut for the club on 24 August 2013, against MTK Budapest. Throughout his stint in the Hungarian circuit, he also participated in the 2013–14 Ligakupa, where he played in 6 matches. His tenure in Hungary was short-lived as he left the club during the 2014 winter transfer market.

After his release from Pécsi, he returned to the local Serbian circuits and initially played with FK Sumadinac. The following season, he secured a contract with Radnički Svilajnac.

=== Canada ===
After his second stint in Serbia, he played in the Canadian Soccer League's first division with the Serbian White Eagles in the summer of 2016. In his debut season in the Canadian circuit, he helped the Serbs clinch a playoff berth by finishing fourth in the division. The Serbs would defeat Toronto Atomic in the first round of the playoffs. The White Eagles would defeat Ukraine United in the next round to advance to the championship final. In the championship final, the club defeated Hamilton City by a score of 2–1.

He re-signed with the western Toronto-based club the following season. Jocić would help the Serbs secure a playoff berth by finishing second in the division. In the preliminary round of the postseason, Toronto would defeat SC Waterloo Region. Serbia's participation in the tournament would conclude in the next round as the York Region Shooters eliminated them. Jocić would return for another season in 2018 and once more he assisted the club in securing a playoff berth.

The 2020 season would mark his fifth and final campaign with the White Eagles. The club would enter the postseason tournament, where Vorkuta defeated them in the opening round.

== Career statistics ==
Appearances and goals by club, season and competition
Club	Season	League		National cup		League cup		Europe		Total	
Club	Season	Apps	Goals	Apps	Goals	Apps	Goals	Apps	Goals	Apps	Goals
Novi Sad	2010–11	8	0	0	0	0	0	0	0	8	0
Novi Sad	2011–12	3	0	1	0	0	0	0	0	4	0
Novi Sad	Total	11	0	1	0	0	0	0	0	12	0
Sombor	2011–12	10	1	0	0	0	0	0	0	10	1
Pécs	2013–14	1	0	0	0	6	0	0	0	7	0
Career total		22	1	1	0	6	0	0	0	29	1

== Honors ==
Serbian White Eagles

- CSL Championship: 2016
