= Kendrick Adams =

American football player (born 1988)

No. 65, 72
- Position: Defensive end

Personal information
- Born: November 3, 1988 (age 38); Enterprise, Alabama
- Listed height: 6 ft 5 in (1.96 m)
- Listed weight: 250 lb (113 kg)

Career information
- High school: Enterprise (AL)
- College: LSU
- NFL draft: 2012: undrafted

Career history
- Jacksonville Jaguars (2012)*; Tampa Bay Buccaneers (2012)*; Detroit Lions (2012)*; Cleveland Browns (2012–2013)*; Cincinnati Bengals (2013)*; New York Giants (2013–2014)*; Tennessee Titans (2014)*
- * Offseason or practice squad member only
- Stats at Pro Football Reference

Kendrick Adams (born November 3, 1988) is an American former football defensive end. He was signed by the Jacksonville Jaguars as an undrafted free agent after 2012 NFL draft. He played college football at Louisiana State University.

He also played for the Tampa Bay Buccaneers, Detroit Lions, Cleveland Browns and Tennessee Titans.

== Professional career ==
=== Jacksonville Jaguars ===
On April 30, 2012, it was announced that Adams signed with the Jacksonville Jaguars as an undrafted free agent. He was waived on September 1, 2012.

=== Tampa Bay Buccaneers ===
On September 27, 2012, he was signed to the practice squad by the Tampa Bay Buccaneers. On October 11, 2012, he was released in order to re-sign LB Markus White.

=== Detroit Lions ===
On October 24, 2012, he was signed to the practice squad by the Detroit Lions

=== Cleveland Browns ===
On January 3, 2013, he was signed by the Cleveland Browns.

=== New York Giants ===
On December 10, 2013, Adams was signed by the New York Giants and placed on the practice squad. On December 30, 2013, he was signed to a reserve/futures contract by the Giants. He was waived on August 5, 2014.

=== Tennessee Titans ===
Adams then signed with the Tennessee Titans, but was released on August 25, 2014.
