= R. J. Roberts =

American gridiron football player (born 1989)

No. 11
- Position: Defensive end

Personal information
- Born: August 24, 1989 (age 37); Enterprise, Alabama, U.S.
- Listed height: 6 ft 4 in (1.93 m)
- Listed weight: 255 lb (116 kg)

Career information
- High school: Enterprise (AL)
- College: Troy

Career history
- 2011: Saskatchewan Roughriders
- 2013: Tampa Bay Storm
- 2015: Edmonton Eskimos*
- 2015: Hudson Valley Fort
- 2018: Massachusetts Pirates
- 2019: Philadelphia Soul
- * Offseason or practice squad member only
- Stats at CFL.ca

Roosevelt J. Roberts (born August 24, 1989) is an American former professional football defensive end. He played college football at Troy University.

== College career ==
Roberts played for the Troy Trojans from 2007 to 2011. He spent a year as a redshirt in 2008 for academic eligibility reasons, and another year as a redshirt in 2010. In early 2011, he was dismissed from the program due to an unspecified violation of team rules. Between the 2007 and 2009 seasons, he accumulated 14 tackles and one blocked kick.

== Professional career ==
In 2011, Roberts played for the Saskatchewan Roughriders of the CFL. He recorded one tackle in a CFL game before being injured during the season and released later that year.

Roberts played in 10 games for the Tampa Bay Storm of the AFL in 2013. He recorded 27 tackles, three sacks, two forced fumbles, and three fumble recoveries.

Roberts was signed as a free agent to the Edmonton Eskimos on April 28, 2015.

Roberts appeared in 1 game for the Massachusetts Pirates in the 2019 season. Roberts recorded 1 sack on the year.
