= Tornado outbreak of February 28 – March 2, 2007 =

Windstorm in the southern United States from Feb 28 - March 2, 2007

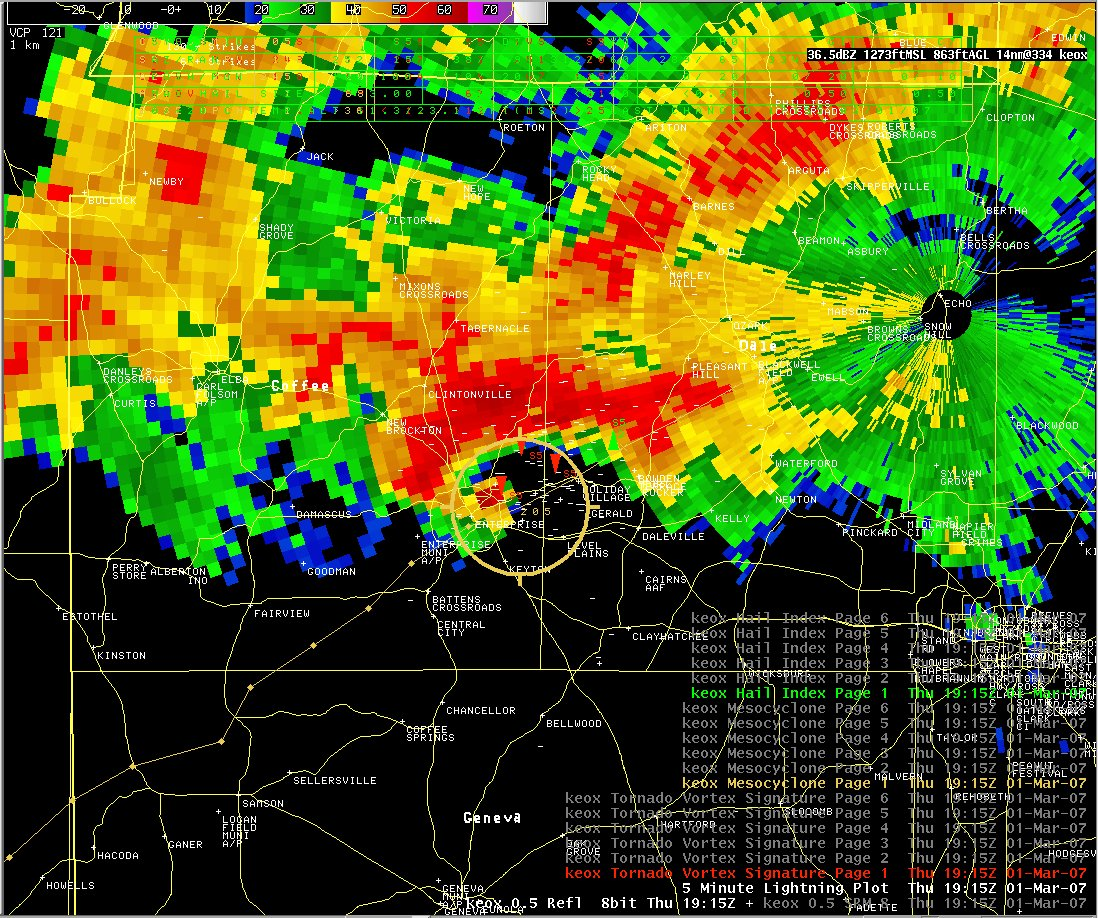
- Radar image of the supercell responsible for producing the Enterprise tornado on March 1

Meteorological history
- Duration: February 28 – March 2, 2007

Tornado outbreak
- Tornadoes: 57
- Max. rating: EF4 tornado
- Duration: 37 hours, 7 minutes
- Highest winds: 185 mph (298 km/h) (Millers Ferry, Alabama tornado on March 1)

Overall effects
- Casualties: 20 fatalities (+19 non-tornadic), 98 injuries
- Damage: >$580 million
- Areas affected: Central and Southern United States
- Part of the tornado outbreaks of 2007

The tornado outbreak of February 28 – March 2, 2007 was a deadly tornado outbreak across the southern United States that began in Kansas on February 28, 2007. The severe weather spread eastward on March 1 and left a deadly mark across the southern US, particularly in Alabama and Georgia. Twenty deaths were reported; one in Missouri, nine in Georgia, and 10 in Alabama. Scattered severe weather was also reported in North Carolina on March 2, producing the final tornado of the outbreak before the storms moved offshore into the Atlantic Ocean.

In the end, there were 57 tornadoes confirmed during the outbreak, including three EF3 tornadoes reported across three states, as well as three EF4 tornadoes; two in Alabama and one in Kansas, the first such tornadoes since the introduction of the Enhanced Fujita Scale. Total damages were estimated at over $580 million from tornadoes alone, making it the fourth-costliest tornado outbreak in US history (the figure not including damage from other thunderstorm impacts including hail and straight-line winds). Insured losses in the state of Georgia topped $210 million, making this outbreak the costliest in that state's history. Enterprise, Alabama, which was hit the hardest, sustained damages in excess of $307 million.

== Meteorological synopsis ==
The tornado outbreak was caused by a large low-pressure system across the central United States that intensified on February 28 over Kansas, and a cold front moved across the region, providing the lift needed to develop storms. Additionally, a strong low-level jet caused a surge of very moist air from the Gulf of Mexico and warm temperatures across the south side of the storm expanded these developments. Temperatures were in the 70s °F (low 20s °C) in some areas to the south, while the mercury was below freezing on the north side. The dewpoints were in the 60 °F (16 °C) range as far north as southeastern Kansas, which provided extra fuel.

The Storm Prediction Center issued a moderate risk of severe storms for February 28 across parts of the central Great Plains. The first tornadoes developed early in the evening that day in Kansas as the dry line pushed eastward and was lifted by the cold front. In total, 12 tornadoes formed that evening across Kansas and Missouri, 11 of which were weak; however, one of these tornadoes was rated an EF4, the first such tornado recorded and the first violent tornado since September 22 of the previous year. No one was injured by that storm. Farther south, expected activity in Oklahoma and Arkansas didn't take place as the atmospheric cap held up.

A high risk of severe storms — the first such issuance since April 7, 2006 — was issued for a large part of the Deep South for March 1 as the cold front moved eastward. The activity began almost immediately, with several isolated tornadoes taking place that morning across the Mississippi Valley, one of which caused the outbreak's first death. Isolated tornadoes were also reported as far north as Illinois, near the center of the low; however, the most intense activity began around noon and continued throughout the afternoon and evening, with southern Alabama and southern Georgia being hit the hardest. Nearly continuous supercells formed north of the Gulf of Mexico and produced many tornadoes, some of which hit large population centers with devastating effects. Those tornadoes killed twenty people.

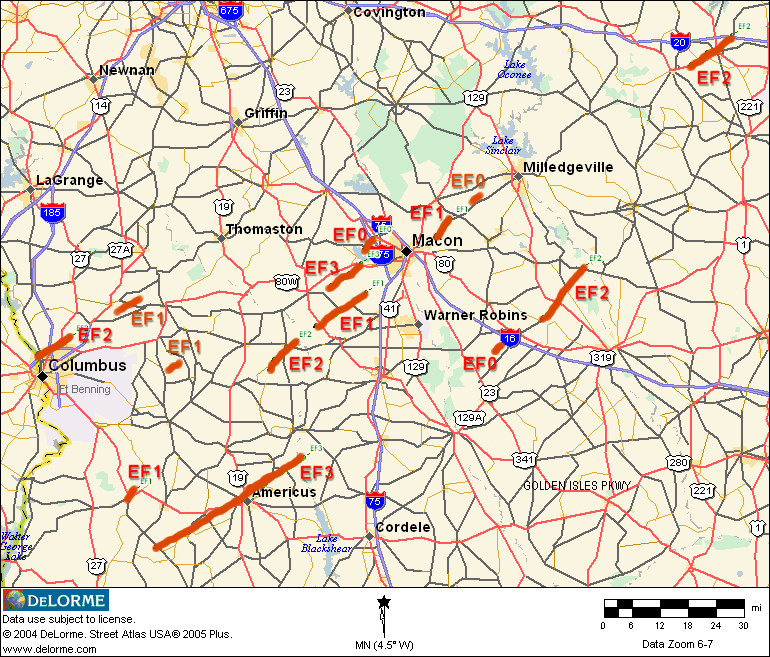
Map of the 14 confirmed tornadoes in central Georgia

The squall line finally overtook the supercells just after midnight on March 2, after putting down 37 tornadoes that day. As the squall line overtook the cells, a few tornadoes — all EF0 — took place overnight in Florida and extreme southern Georgia within the squall line, before the severe weather emerged in the Atlantic Ocean that morning. The final tornado was a landfalling waterspout in the Outer Banks of North Carolina late that morning. In addition to the tornadoes, widespread straight-line wind damage from microbursts were also reported, along with scattered large hail, the largest of which were the size of baseballs.

== Confirmed tornadoes ==
Confirmed tornadoes by Enhanced Fujita rating
| EFU | EF0 | EF1 | EF2 | EF3 | EF4 | EF5 | Total |
|---|---|---|---|---|---|---|---|
| 0 | 22 | 20 | 9 | 3 | 3 | 0 | 57 |

=== February 28 event ===
List of confirmed tornadoes – Wednesday, February 28, 2007 (Note: All dates are based on the local time zone where the tornado touched down; however, all times are in Coordinated Universal Time for consistency.)
| EF# | Location | County / Parish | State | Start Coord. | Time (UTC) | Path length | Max width | Summary |
|---|---|---|---|---|---|---|---|---|
| EF0 | Tamarac to Lauderhill | Broward | FL | 26.2°N 80.22°W | 18:55–19:00 | 2.17 mi (3.49 km) | 100 yd (91 m) | A roof and a porch screen were damaged, and tree branches were broken. |
| EF0 | W of Neosho Falls (1st tornado) | Woodson | KS | 38°N 95.59°W | 00:33–00:36 | 0.25 mi (0.40 km) | 50 yd (46 m) | This was the first of two simultaneous, short-lived, rope tornadoes that did not cause damage. |
| EF0 | W of Neosho Falls (2nd tornado) | Woodson | KS | 38°N 95.59°W | 00:33–00:36 | 0.25 mi (0.40 km) | 50 yd (46 m) | This was the second of two simultaneous, short-lived, rope tornadoes that did not cause damage. |
| EF0 | WSW of Colony | Anderson | KS | 38.0534°N 95.4209°W | 00:53–00:54 | 1.17 mi (1.88 km) | 50 yd (46 m) | This tornado remained over open country and did not cause damage. |
| EF0 | N of Carlyle (1st tornado) | Allen | KS | 38.01°N 95.4°W | 01:01–01:03 | 0.1 mi (0.16 km) | 20 yd (18 m) | A brief rope tornado touched down in an open field and did not cause damage. |
| EF1 | E of Colony to E of Welda | Anderson | KS | 38.07°N 95.3401°W | 01:05–01:22 | 9.42 mi (15.16 km) | 440 yd (400 m) | Greater than 40 structures were damaged, mostly minor. Many trees and power lines were downed, and numerous outbuildings were destroyed. A barn was also destroyed, and a few houses suffered major structural damage. Windows were blown out of numerous homes and vehicles, and a large metal horse arena with steel girders and concrete footings was lifted out of the ground and destroyed. A horse and rider were thrown about 100 feet (30 m) but were uninjured. Another horse was injured when it had a steel pipe driven through its head. An old railroad car - being used as a shed at that time - was rolled three times and smashed multiple fences. |
| EF0 | N of Carlyle (2nd tornado) | Allen | KS | 38.0301°N 95.4°W | 01:07–01:09 | 0.25 mi (0.40 km) | 250 yd (230 m) | Three tornadoes combined into a larger tornado that remained over open country and did not cause damage. |
| EF4 | E of Selma to Trading Post | Anderson, Linn | KS | 38.13°N 95.1°W | 01:24–02:10 | 28.01 mi (45.08 km) | 800 yd (730 m) | A large wedge tornado touched down in Anderson County, downing trees and flattening grasses with weak EF0 intensity. It moved into Linn County where a farmhouse was swept away, with only the basement remaining. Several other houses and farm buildings were damaged or destroyed as it passed well north of Blue Mound and Mound City. The occupants of the house that sustained EF4 damage were in a storm cellar at the time and were not injured. Extensive tree and power line damage was reported in Linn County before the tornado lifted north-northeast of Pleasanton. This was the first tornado to be rated EF4 on the newly implemented Enhanced Fujita Scale. |
| EF1 | ESE of Amsterdam to Burdett | Bates | MO | 38.3334°N 94.5289°W | 02:27–02:37 | 12.87 mi (20.71 km) | 100 yd (91 m) | The same storm that produced the EF4 tornado in Linn County, Kansas later produced this tornado. Major damage was reported to one house and minor damage to several other structures. Trees and power lines were downed. |
| EF1 | E of Gunn City/Hadsell to SW of Kingsville | Cass, Johnson | MO | 38.67°N 94.1515°W | 04:05–04:14 | 6.23 mi (10.03 km) | 50 yd (46 m) | A mobile home was destroyed, and two houses and a garage were damaged. |

=== March 1 event ===
List of confirmed tornadoes – Thursday, March 1, 2007
| EF# | Location | County / Parish | State | Start Coord. | Time (UTC) | Path length | Max width | Summary |
|---|---|---|---|---|---|---|---|---|
| EF0 | N of Madison | Monroe | MO | 39.523°N 92.2246°W | 07:30–07:35 | 2.07 mi (3.33 km) | 50 yd (46 m) | An intermittent tornado destroyed a machine shed, scattering debris up to 300 yards (270 m) away. Flying debris damaged another machine shed and the roof of a farmhouse. Farther along the tornado's track, a house sustained slight roof damage, and several tree limbs and pine trees were downed. |
| EF1 | ESE of Maud | Monroe | MO | 39.6024°N 92.1498°W | 07:40–07:45 | 3.36 mi (5.41 km) | 60 yd (55 m) | The same supercell that produced the previous tornado produced another intermittent tornado that destroyed a machine shed and damaged a pole barn. Debris from the machine shed was scattered up to 0.5 miles (0.80 km) away. Several trees were downed, and four cows were killed by flying debris. |
| EF1 | N of Granville to ESE of Shelbina | Monroe, Shelby | MO | 39.5988°N 92.1°W | 07:43–07:49 | 8.62 mi (13.87 km) | 100 yd (91 m) | This was the third tornado produced by the Monroe County supercell. A metal shed, a pole barn, and a house were damaged before the tornado moved northeast where it downed several trees and damaged numerous structures and automobiles. A house lost parts of its roof and walls, and a mobile home was flipped over. The tornado continued to the northeast where it partially destroyed a shed and completely destroyed a pole barn. Many cedar trees were downed, and another pole barn sustained minor roof and siding damage. The tornado downed more trees and power poles before moving into Shelby County, where it destroyed another pole barn before dissipating. |
| EF0 | E of Yocum | Carroll | AR | 36.4193°N 93.3919°W | 10:28–10:30 | 2 mi (3.2 km) | 50 yd (46 m) | Several trees were snapped, and a chicken house was damaged. |
| EF3 | SW of Caulfield to SW of West Plains | Ozark, Howell | MO | 36.59°N 92.15°W | 12:24–12:43 | 15 mi (24 km) | 200 yd (180 m) | 1 death – Trees and power lines were downed at EF1 intensity in Ozark County; then, the tornado quickly moved into Howell County where it rapidly intensified. As it directly struck the town of Caulfield, it destroyed numerous structures and some farms in the area as well as severely damaging a gas station. A person was killed when their mobile home was destroyed. Four other people reportedly suffered injuries during the same incident, but this was not officially counted. |
| EF0 | SE of Archie | Catahoula | LA | 37.4389°N 89.3036°W | 15:50–15:51 | 0.5 mi (0.80 km) | 50 yd (46 m) | A brief tornado remained in a wooded area and did not cause damage. |
| EF0 | W of Jonesboro | Union | IL | 37.4389°N 89.3036°W | 16:45–16:47 | 1.8 mi (2.9 km) | 150 yd (140 m) | About 15 to 20 houses suffered minor damage. Many trees were either uprooted or toppled, including one tree that landed on a house and trapped its resident. |
| EF0 | NNW of Spring Hill | Santa Rosa | FL | 30.77°N 86.94°W | 17:20–17:22 | 0.5 mi (0.80 km) | 30 yd (27 m) | A weak tornado briefly touched down in a forest, downing several trees and power lines. |
| EF1 | E of Benton to ESE of Midway | Yazoo | MS | 32.7993°N 90.2335°W | 17:58–18:05 | 6.47 mi (10.41 km) | 100 yd (91 m) | Many trees and power lines were downed, and a barn suffered roof damage. |
| EF0 | NNW of Industry | Butler | AL | 31.63°N 96.64°W | 18:05–18:10 | 3.15 mi (5.07 km) | 30 yd (27 m) | Several trees were blown down, and a tractor-trailer was blown off SR 106. |
| EF4 | NW of Millers Ferry to SW of Cahaba | Wilcox, Dallas | AL | 32.12°N 87.4087°W | 18:27–18:48 | 18.32 mi (29.48 km) | 500 yd (460 m) | 1 death – See section on this tornado – 2 injuries also occurred from this tornado. |
| EF0 | Elwin | Macon | IL | 39.7749°N 88.9867°W | 18:47–18:48 | 1 mi (1.6 km) | 30 yd (27 m) | A front porch and church's chimney were damaged. Many trees were downed, one of which fell across three vehicles. One person suffered minor injuries when they were blown to the ground. |
| EF4 | Enterprise | Coffee, Dale | AL | 31.2836°N 85.9191°W | 19:08–19:18 | 10.33 mi (16.62 km) | 500 yd (460 m) | 9 deaths – See section on this tornado – This was the first tornado to cause deaths at a school since 1993. Fifty other people were injured. |
| EF1 | SW of Echo, AL to S of Hatcher, GA | Dale (AL), Henry (AL), Clay (GA), Quitman (GA) | AL, GA | 31.4493°N 85.506°W | 19:48–20:38 | 37.94 mi (61.06 km) | 150 yd (140 m) | This long-tracked tornado touched down in Dale County where 24 mobile homes were damaged and five more were destroyed. Four people were injured in one of the mobile homes. The tornado also destroyed 18 chicken houses, killing around 140,000 chickens. Numerous trees and utility poles were downed as well. The tornado's path missed the Ft Rucker, Alabama WSR-88D RDA site by less than 0.25 miles (0.40 km) The tornado moved into Henry County, where it caused sporadic tree damage. In the town of Bethlehem, 51 mobile homes were damaged, an additional 28 were destroyed, and two more people were injured in one of these mobile homes. A "semi-truck" was overturned before the tornado entered Otho where the it destroyed 14 houses and damaged 27 others. The tornado weakened as it crossed the state line into Clay County, Georgia near Lake Eufaula where it damaged several more houses and downed more trees with EF0 intensity. It downed a few more trees in Quitman County before lifting. |
| EF1 | Northwestern Elkton | Todd | KY | 36.8251°N 87.1564°W | 20:20–20:21 | 0.2 mi (0.32 km) | 30 yd (27 m) | This tornado struck a neighborhood in the northwest side of Elkton where it blew the roofs off a house, mobile home, and storage facility. A chain-link fence and several trees were downed as well. |
| EF2 | Sandy Ridge to NW of Mathews | Lowndes, Montgomery | AL | 32.0275°N 86.4486°W | 20:48–21:26 | 24.55 mi (39.51 km) | 600 yd (550 m) | A tornado touched down in Lowndes County and quickly intensified to EF2 strength, damaging several structures, downing trees, and injuring four people. As it moved into Montgomery County, it grew wider and started a path of damage and destruction through the rural communities of Davenport, Fleta, Ada, and Sprague. Ten automobiles were significantly damaged, with two people injured when one of those cars was thrown 100 yards (91 m) from the road. Five large chicken houses were obliterated near Davenport, and at least 23 barns and outbuildings sustained damage. One high-voltage power transmission line was totally destroyed, and 39 houses were damaged, three of which were destroyed. Fourteen grain silos were also destroyed, with four of them thrown up to 0.5 miles (0.80 km) away from where they were anchored. Hundreds of trees were snapped and uprooted along the path. |
| EF1 | S of Bluff to S of Glen Allen | Fayette | AL | 33.81°N 87.9°E | 20:59–21:08 | 11.22 mi (18.06 km) | 150 yd (140 m) | Several houses and storage buildings were damaged, and many trees were downed as well. |
| EF1 | N of Samantha | Tuscaloosa | AL | 33.4275°N 87.6416°W | 21:00–21:05 | 3.73 mi (6.00 km) | 100 yd (91 m) | Numerous trees were uprooted, and a brick house lost its roof. The storm was initially confirmed as two different tornado tracks but revised as a single tornado following an aerial survey. |
| EF1 | Richland | Stewart | GA | 32.0749°N 84.676°W | 21:11–21:13 | 1.5 mi (2.4 km) | 250 yd (230 m) | A weak but damaging tornado moved directly through downtown Richland. At least 50 houses and businesses suffered varying degrees of damage. A frail wooden commercial building and a church were destroyed. One mobile home was shifted off its foundation, a tractor-trailer was lifted and dropped, and trees and power lines were downed. |
| EF1 | NNE of Eufaula | Barbour | AL | 31.9830°N 85.1300°W | 21:12–21:15 | 2.4 mi (3.9 km) | 75 yd (69 m) | A tornado moved through Lakepoint State Park, where at least 100 pine trees were snapped and several power lines were downed. |
| EF2 | W of Arley to NW of Crane Hill | Winston, Cullman | AL | 34.08°N 87.25°W | 21:45–21:57 | 9.62 mi (15.48 km) | 100 yd (91 m) | Several houses and barns were damaged along the path. One chicken house was destroyed, and two others sustained major damage. Numerous trees were either uprooted or snapped. |
| EF1 | Adamsville | Jefferson | AL | 33.5774°N 86.9515°W | 22:06–22:08 | 0.9 mi (1.4 km) | 400 yd (370 m) | Dozens of trees were either uprooted or snapped. Many trees fell on houses and caused significant structural damage. One house had a large portion of its roof lifted off. |
| EF2 | SE of Butler to Reynolds | Taylor | GA | 32.4893°N 84.1564°W | 22:29–22:40 | 7.69 mi (12.38 km) | 448 yd (410 m) | 1 death – Near the town of Potterville, this large tornado destroyed two mobile homes, damaged others, and caused extensive damage to trees and power lines. One person was killed and four others injured in this area. The tornado weakened as it moved northeastward but still downed trees and caused minor roof damage to several houses in Reynolds. |
| EF3 | E of Knoxville to SE of Lizella | Crawford, Bibb | GA | 32.72°N 83.9313°W | 22:34–22:47 | 9.72 mi (15.64 km) | 448 yd (410 m) | Several houses and outbuildings were damaged or destroyed along Sandy Point Road, and many trees were downed in Crawford County; in Bibb County, one house was damaged, and several trees and power lines were downed. Nine people reported injuries. |
| EF1 | Zenith to NW of Byron | Crawford | GA | 32.6099°N 83.9704°W | 22:49–23:03 | 11.86 mi (19.09 km) | 100 yd (91 m) | Numerous trees were downed, a number of outbuildings were damaged or destroyed, and several houses sustained minor structural damage. |
| EF0 | W of Payne | Bibb | GA | 32.87°N 83.8119°W | 22:51–22:54 | 2.55 mi (4.10 km) | 100 yd (91 m) | A gas station, the roof of a house, and several signs and traffic signals were all damaged. Trees and power lines were damaged or downed. |
| EF2 | NW of Phenix City, AL to W of Midland, GA | Russell (AL), Lee (AL), Muscogee (GA) | AL, GA | 32.5098°N 85.0505°W | 23:27–23:41 | 10.3 mi (16.6 km) | 300 yd (270 m) | See section on this tornado – One person was injured. |
| EF1 | NW of Griswoldville to SW of James | Jones | GA | 32.9007°N 83.5165°W | 23:30–23:35 | 3.62 mi (5.83 km) | 150 yd (140 m) | Many trees were downed, some of which fell onto houses. Several commercial and residential structures suffered varying degrees of damage, and a railroad crossing arm and its support pole were knocked over. |
| EF0 | ENE of James | Jones | GA | 32.9899°N 83.4102°W | 23:44–23:45 | 0.02 mi (0.032 km) | 50 yd (46 m) | A very brief tornado, that came from the same cell that produced the first Jones County tornado, downed about two dozen trees in less than one minute. |
| EF1 | S of Ryan | Shelby | AL | 33.1577°N 86.8592°W | 23:56–23:57 | 0.65 mi (1.05 km) | 100 yd (91 m) | At least 15 large pine trees were snapped. One house and a barn both sustained significant roof damage. |
| EF1 | NE of Baughville to WNW of Talbotton | Talbot | GA | 32.68°N 84.6588°W | 00:00–00:05 | 4.1 mi (6.6 km) | 100 yd (91 m) | Several houses suffered minor roof damage, and five outbuildings and one mobile home were destroyed. A porch was destroyed at a house, and a feed store and barn were damaged. Numerous trees were downed as well. |
| EF2 | ENE of Warrenton | Warren, McDuffie | GA | 33.4221°N 82.606°W | 01:08–01:24 | 11.74 mi (18.89 km) | 448 yd (410 m) | In Warren County, a school and several mobile homes were damaged, and another mobile home was destroyed. Eight houses received major damage, 13 were moderately damaged, and 17 others sustained minor damage before the tornado crossed into McDuffie County. After crossing the county line, the tornado moved directly through Thomson, downing numerous trees and power lines; in addition, several vehicles, houses, and a private school sustained moderate or major damage. Three people were injured in Warren County. |
| EF3 | SE of Weston to Americus to SSW of Oglethorpe | Webster, Sumter, Macon | GA | 31.9217°N 84.5513°W | 02:00–02:40 | 43.2 mi (69.5 km) | 1,790 yd (1,640 m) | 2 deaths – See section on this tornado – At least 11 people were injured. |
| EF0 | SW of Cary | Bleckley | GA | 32.5467°N 83.2869°W | 03:30–03:32 | 1.38 mi (2.22 km) | 448 yd (410 m) | A short-lived tornado destroyed several outbuildings and the back porch of a business. It also damaged the porches of several other structures and the roofs of three houses. In addition, numerous trees were downed. |
| EF2 | NE of Allentown to ESE of Toomsboro | Wilkinson | GA | 32.6551°N 83.1514°W | 03:40–03:53 | 13.27 mi (21.36 km) | 895 yd (818 m) | A large tornado moved through mostly rural areas. One house suffered minor to moderate damage, and many trees and power lines were downed. |
| EF1 | W of Mauk | Marion | GA | 32.4901°N 84.5103°W | 03:52–03:54 | 2.51 mi (4.04 km) | 100 yd (91 m) | One barn was destroyed, and a mobile home was shifted off its foundation. The roofs of a house and barn were both damaged. Numerous trees and fences were downed. |
| EF2 | W of Newton to N of Bridgeboro | Baker, Mitchell, Dougherty, Worth | GA | 31.32°N 84.4485°W | 04:44–05:17 | 30.53 mi (49.13 km) | 200 yd (180 m) | 6 deaths – This long-tracked tornado touched down in Baker County and destroyed a mobile home park just north of Newton; there, six people were killed and three others were injured. A church and 18 houses were destroyed; in addition, ten other houses had minor damage, and nine more had major damage. The tornado crossed into Mitchell County where it destroyed two houses and caused major damage to 25 others as well as minor damage to 26 more. Thirteen businesses sustained minor damage, about 200 acres of pecan trees were uprooted, and a "semi truck" was flipped. The tornado moved into Dougherty County and ripped carports and shingles away from several houses. Two houses sustained major damage, and ten others had minor damage. Hundreds of trees were downed before the tornado crossed into Worth County and moved north of Bridgeboro; there, it uprooted trees and damaged several mobile homes before dissipating. |

=== March 2 event ===
List of confirmed tornadoes – Friday, March 2, 2007
| EF# | Location | County / Parish | State | Start Coord. | Time (UTC) | Path length | Max width | Summary |
|---|---|---|---|---|---|---|---|---|
| EF2 | SSW of Sylvester | Worth | GA | 31.4432°N 83.8922°W | 05:20–05:28 | 4.55 mi (7.32 km) | 150 yd (140 m) | This tornado came from the same supercell that produced the long-tracked Newton EF2 tornado. A brick house lost its roof and some exterior walls collapsed. Two vehicles outside that house were thrown into a nearby field. Many trees were uprooted, one of which fell on another house. The tornado moved northeastward and destroyed another house, injuring two people. Finally, it downed hundreds more trees before dissipating. |
| EF2 | Sumner | Worth | GA | 31.5066°N 83.7565°W | 05:30–05:35 | 2.93 mi (4.72 km) | 200 yd (180 m) | A mobile home was destroyed and 24 other structures were damaged, about half of them heavily. Many trees and power poles were downed. |
| EF1 | N of Chula | Tift, Turner | GA | 31.55°N 83.6179°W | 05:42–05:52 | 7.9 mi (12.7 km) | 150 yd (140 m) | A tornado touched down in Tift County and moved northeastward, striking Sunsweet. Seven houses were heavily damaged, and 13 others sustained minor damage. Numerous trees were downed before the tornado entered Turner County where it destroyed a barn and two houses then caused roof damage to several others. In addition, 13 other houses sustained varying degrees of damage. Trees, fences, and an irrigation system were downed before the tornado dissipated. |
| EF0 | E of Monticello | Jefferson | FL | 30.53°N 83.8364°W | 07:10–07:16 | 2.28 mi (3.67 km) | 50 yd (46 m) | A quick spin-up tornado that formed on the leading edge of a squall line uprooted several trees and caused minor roof damage to one structure. |
| EF0 | NNE of New Ellenton | Aiken | SC | 33.65°N 81.68°W | 07:20–07:30 | 4.48 mi (7.21 km) | 80 yd (73 m) | A weak tornado caused minor damage to two houses and downed trees. |
| EF1 | Cherry Lake | Madison | FL | 30.58°N 83.43°W | 07:36–07:44 | 3 mi (4.8 km) | 50 yd (46 m) | A house sustained roof and porch damage, and 130 acres of planted pine trees were knocked down, with some of those trees landing on and damaging a vehicle. |
| EF0 | Lake Park | Lowndes | GA | 30.6745°N 83.1955°W | 07:55–08:01 | 2 mi (3.2 km) | 50 yd (46 m) | Brief tornado touched down near a RV park. Minor structural damage was observed, and numerous trees were downed. |
| EF0 | N of Wellborn | Suwannee | FL | 30.29°N 82.82°W | 09:00 | 0.1 mi (0.16 km) | 100 yd (91 m) | A brief tornado was reported by the Suwannee Valley Electric Company. It caused heavy damage to a garage and downed trees and power lines. |
| EF0 | SSE of Callahan | Nassau | FL | 30.5322°N 81.8018°W | 10:25–10:30 | 1.19 mi (1.92 km) | 100 yd (91 m) | A tornado damaged three mobile homes, several sheds, and some fences. A number of trees were downed as well. |
| EF0 | NNE of Gloucester | Carteret | NC | 34.75°N 76.53°W | 13:40–13:41 | 0.1 mi (0.16 km) | 10 yd (9.1 m) | A waterspout moved ashore near Smyrna and blew siding off a house. |

=== Millers Ferry, Alabama ===
Millers Ferry, Alabama
- Aerial view of EF4 damage near Millers Ferry

Meteorological history
- Formed: March 1, 2007, 12:27 p.m. CDT (UTC−05:00)
- Dissipated: March 1, 2007, 12:48 p.m. CDT (UTC−05:00)
- Duration: 21 minutes

EF4 tornado
- on the Enhanced Fujita scale
- Highest winds: 185 mph (298 km/h)

Overall effects
- Casualties: 1 fatality, 2 injuries
- Damage: $2.00 million (2008 USD)

During the early afternoon of Thursday, March 1, around 12:27 pm CST (18:27 UTC), this violent tornado first touched down over State Highway 28 near Millers Ferry Lock and Dam in Wilcox County. The tornado quickly moved northeast across The Alabama River and William "Bill" Dannelly Reservoir, before moving ashore into Sand Lake Drive. In this area, multiple homes would end up completely destroyed, with many manufactured homes being leveled from their foundations. The first and only fatality would also occur in this area when a tornado hit a manufactured home, and threw the home owner out of his house, with the straps holding down the manufactured home snapping. The resident was later found in a pile of debris. Other residents in the neighborhood had sheltered underground, and avoided any serious injuries from the tornado. Two additional injuries also occurred in Sand Lake Drive when two occupants were thrown from their trailer. The tornado continued into sparsely populated areas of Wilcox county where EF1 damage would continue to occur. The tornado would continue causing damage to multiple homes and hunting camps, before the tornado would cross into Dallas County southeast of the town of Alberta. The tornado would eventually restrengthen to EF2 intensity, and continue to cause major damage south of Five Points along County Roads 31-33, where multiple homes sustained major damage, with 2 of them being completely destroyed. Multiple outbuildings were also damaged by the tornado in this area. Numerous trees were also snapped or uprooted, and power lines were also severely damaged. The tornado would dissipate east of the Whites Bluff Community after crossing The Alabama River a second time.

Overall, the tornado was rated EF4 with winds up to 185 miles per hour (298 km/h), making it the strongest tornado of the outbreak.

=== Enterprise, Alabama ===
Enterprise, Alabama
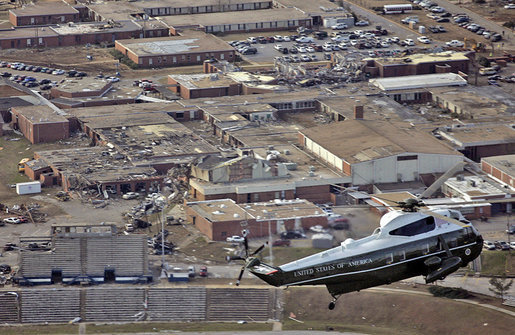
- US President G.W. Bush surveys tornado damage at Enterprise High School from Marine One.

Meteorological history
- Date: March 1, 2007, 1:08 p.m. CDT (UTC−05:00)
- Dissipated: March 1, 2007, 1:18 p.m. CDT (UTC−05:00)
- Duration: 10 minutes

EF4 tornado
- on the Enhanced Fujita scale
- Highest winds: 170 mph (270 km/h)

Overall effects
- Casualties: 9 fatalities, 50 injuries
- Damage: $307 million (2008 USD)

Early on the afternoon of Thursday, March 1, at 1:08 pm CST (19:08 UTC), a destructive tornado first developed near the Enterprise Municipal Airport. The tornado lifted off the ground briefly before returning to the ground as an even stronger storm. It quickly slammed into Enterprise, Alabama, at 1:12 pm CST (19:12 UTC). The tornado left severe damage throughout a large section of the city. The most severe damage took place at Enterprise High School, where a section of the school was destroyed during the middle of the school day. Eight students were killed at the school and 50 other people were taken to local hospitals. Some early reports suggested that there had been as many as 15 deaths at Enterprise High School and 18 deaths statewide, which was found to be an over-estimation. It was the first U.S. tornado to cause fatalities at a school since the Grand Isle, Louisiana tornado in 1993, and the deadliest tornado-related school disaster since one in Belvidere, Illinois in 1967. One other death was reported in Enterprise at a nearby private residence when a woman's living room window was shattered by the tornado.

At the school, the fatalities resulted from the collapse of a concrete block wall. One hallway completely collapsed, trapping many students in the rubble of the hallway known as 3rd Hall. The tornado at the school was so strong that it tossed and mangled cars in the parking lot, flattened parts of the stadium and tore trees out of the ground. School buses were there for an early dismissal due to the storms at just after 1:00 pm, but the tornado hit before the school could be dismissed.

Nearby Hillcrest Elementary School also sustained severe damage from the tornado. After the tornado hit, students from both schools who were not injured were relocated by emergency personnel to Hillcrest Baptist Church, adjacent to the schools and which was not damaged, in order to meet up with shocked parents. Emergency personnel also rushed to the school to send the most seriously injured to local hospitals and provide treatment on the scene to others.

The tornado initially formed in a neighborhood just south of the downtown area; after demolishing a section of the downtown area, it moved on to the schools. The tornado then continued northeast crossing the Holly Hill and Dixie Drive areas. A quarter-mile-wide (400 m) swath was devastated, with enormous damage reported to many houses and businesses, some of which were flattened. Several other schools and the local YMCA were among the damaged buildings. According to the Red Cross, 239 homes were destroyed, 374 sustained major damage, 529 sustained minor damage, and 251 homes were affected.

The tornado itself was estimated to have been 500 yards (460 m) wide and have had a path length of 10 miles (16 km). It dissipated shortly after leaving Enterprise. It was given an initial rating of EF3 on the Enhanced Fujita Scale. However, after a detailed survey, the tornado was upgraded to a low-end EF4 with winds around 170 miles per hour (270 km/h). This upgrade was based on the finding of flattened houses near the school. A total of $307 million in damages were inflicted on the city of Enterprise.

=== Phenix City, Alabama/Columbus–Midland, Georgia ===
Phenix City, Alabama/Columbus–Midland, Georgia
Meteorological history
- Formed: March 1, 2007, 5:27 p.m. CDT (UTC−05:00)
- Dissipated: March 1, 2007, 5:31 p.m. CDT (UTC−05:00)
- Duration: 4 minutes

EF2 tornado
- on the Enhanced Fujita scale
- Highest winds: 111–135 mph (179–217 km/h)

Overall effects
- Casualties: 1 injury
- Damage: $28.103 million (2008 USD)

During the afternoon of March 1, a short lived yet strong EF2 rated tornado tore a 11.74 mile (18 km) path across eastern Alabama and western Georgia. The tornado had a maximum width of 300 yards (270 m), which was recorded in west Georgia.

The tornado first touched down on the Russell-Lee County line, on the northwestern side of Phenix City. The damage in Russell County was sparse, and limited to minor tree damage. The tornado then crossed into Lee County, and quickly strengthened as it approached Lake Oliver on the Chattahoochee River. The greatest damage occurred from Summerville Road into the River Oak and Rock Island areas, where numerous pine trees were snapped off and hardwood trees were uprooted. At least 20 residential properties reported tree damage. At least 25 homes suffered shingle, window or minor structural damage. Some of the fallen trees landed on homes and produced moderate damage.

The tornado would then cross State lines into Georgia and enter Muscogee County, quickly entering and hitting the northern suburbs of Columbus and the north end of Lake Oliver, primarily impacting Green Island Hills, Brookstone, Autumn Ridge, Hamilton Station, and Old Moon Road, before finally lifting 3 miles (4.8 km) west of Midland. The heaviest damage occurred in the 6200 block of Brookstone Boulevard just north of U.S. Highway 80 in the northwest part of Columbus. Several homes in this area suffered heavy damage and at least one injury was confirmed. In addition, several commercial buildings on Veterans Parkway sustained substantial structural damage. Windows were blown out, large air conditioning units were tossed about, large metal business signs were blown down, and power poles were twisted and blown down. The Hawthorn Suites on North Lake Parkway was destroyed from roof and water damage. Nearby, the Ramada Inn under construction also suffered considerable damage while a nearby Holiday Inn Express sustained minor damage. At the intersection of Double Churches Road and Veterans Parkway, the Eckerds Pharmacy was ripped apart by the tornado. About 30 employees and customers were in the store at the time, but they were able to find shelter and no one was hurt. In addition, several churches, including Wynnbrook Baptist, Saint Mark's United Methodist, and Old Moon Road Churches were heavily damaged. Hundreds of trees were down in the area, a number of which fell on parked cars. Many power lines were down and thousands were left without power, some for over a day.

=== Americus, Georgia ===
Americus, Georgia
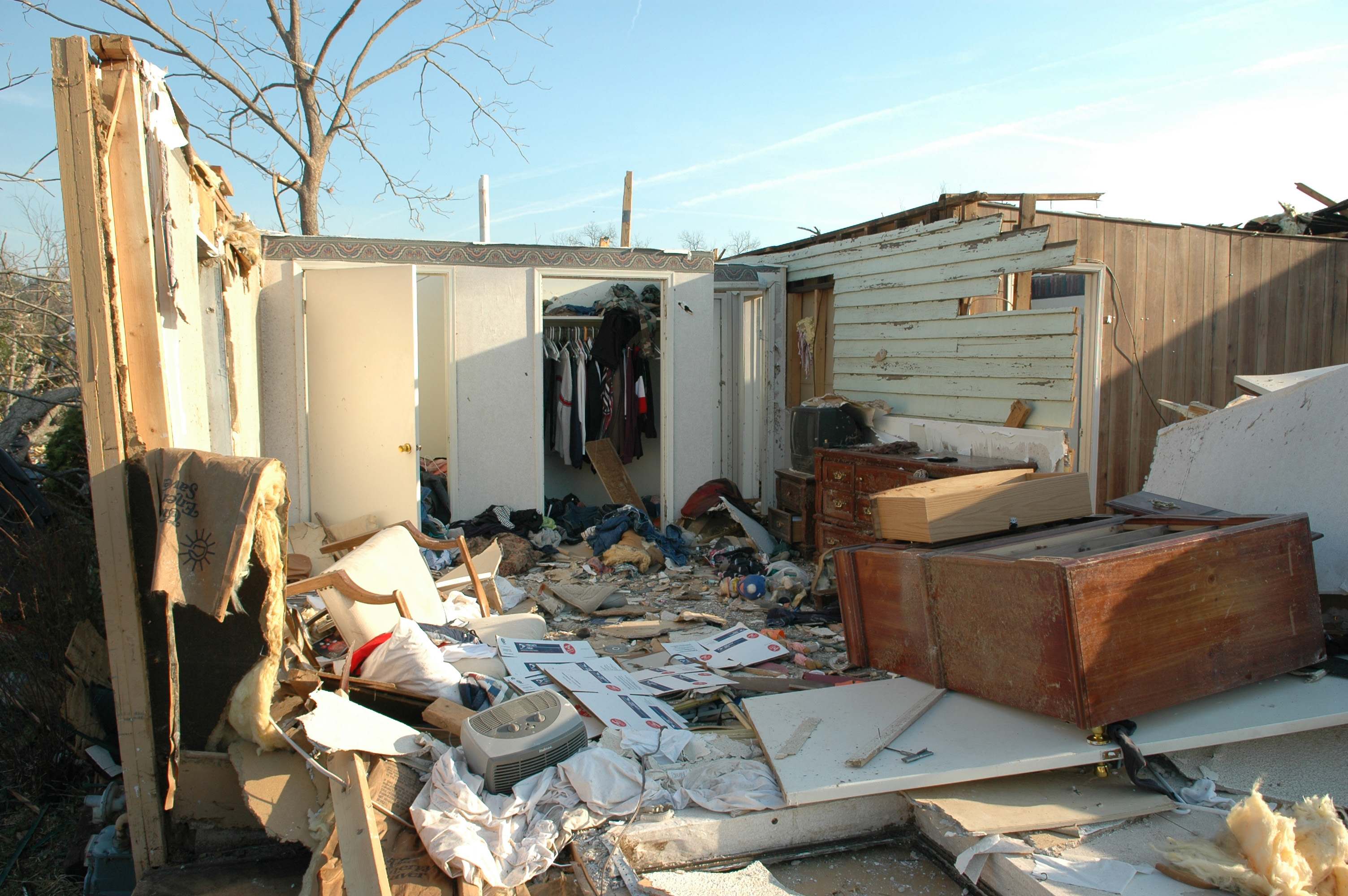
- Tornado damage in Americus

Meteorological history
- Formed: March 1, 2007, 9:00 p.m. CDT (UTC−05:00)
- Dissipated: March 1, 2007, 9:40 p.m. CDT (UTC−05:00)
- Duration: 40 minutes

EF3 tornado
- on the Enhanced Fujita scale
- Highest winds: 136–165 mph (219–266 km/h)

Overall effects
- Casualties: 2 fatalities, 11 injuries
- Damage: $111 million (2008 USD)

On the evening of March 1, Georgia's most significant tornado of the outbreak took place. This tornado began at approximately 9:00 pm EST (02:00 UTC), about 6 miles (9.7 km) southeast of Weston in Webster County, Georgia. At 9:07 pm, it moved into Sumter County, about 5 miles (8.0 km) southeast of Dumas. No one was killed there but three people were injured as numerous buildings were damaged. The worst damage in the county occurred on East Centerpoint Road northeast of Chambliss. There, a cinder block house and two machine shops were destroyed, and a 25-foot section of asphalt was scoured from a nearby road. The three injuries occurred in the home, and 5 cows died on a nearby farm. A tractor-trailer near Chambliss was travelling on Highway 520 and was flipped over by the tornado. It caught fire and burned completely. At the intersection of the highway and TV Tower Road nearby, the Georgia Public Television transmission tower was damaged. Two-thirds of it was twisted and only 150 feet (46 m) was left standing afterwards. Many trees and power lines were downed in the area.

In Sumter County, the tornado move northeast and, passing by Plains and striking Americus. The worst damage was to the Sumter Regional Hospital; every building there was destroyed, causing $100 million in damage to the facility. The buildings included a row of doctors' offices and the Sumter HealthPlex, a newly built 8,000-square-foot (740 m^{2}) facility. It went through demolition later in the year and did not reopen until 2011. Extensive damage was done elsewhere in the city. All casualties in the county were in Americus; two people, a 53-year-old man and 43-year-old woman, died in a house when a wall collapsed inside it. The tornado moved right over the downtown area and business district. The Winn-Dixie Supermarket was completely destroyed, and the McDonald's, Wendy's, Zaxby's, Domino's Pizza, and several more local businesses were damaged or destroyed. The tornado passed right through the National Register Historic District, damaging roughly 250 historical homes, several of which were destroyed. The city's most notable cemetery, the Oak Grove Cemetery, built in 1856, suffered moderate damage. Marble monuments, some 30 feet (9.1 m) tall, were smashed, 26 wrought-iron fences were toppled, and 104 cedar, magnolia, and oak trees were lost. The historic Rees Park High School sustained moderate damage but was not in use. Americus churches were not spared, as ten of them were damaged, including The Old Shady Grove Church. Parks were badly affected as well. Rees Park lost 25 trees and nearby Myers Park lost 39.

The toll for damage in the county amounted to $110 million. A total of 31 residences, 42 businesses, one church, and one hospital were destroyed. Another 116 residences, 27 businesses, two churches, and three recreation facilities / parks sustained major damage. Moderate damage was inflicted on 260 residences, 60 businesses, five churches, a school, three recreation facilities / parks, and 2 cemeteries. Minor damage was reported to 586 residences, 88 businesses, two churches, a school, a fire station, two recreation facilities / parks, and a cemetery. A total of 75 structures were destroyed, 148 sustained major damage, 331 sustained moderate damage, and 681 sustained minor damage (a total of 1,235 structures). Of these, 993 were residences, 217 were businesses, 10 were churches, two were schools, one was a hospital, one was a fire station, eight were recreation facilities / parks, and three were cemeteries. Two people died in the county and eight others were injured.

At 9:36 pm, the tornado entered Macon County about 7 miles (11 km) southwest of Oglethorpe, Georgia, but only continued for three miles (4.8 km) after that. It lifted at 9:40 pm, about 5 miles (8.0 km) south-southwest of Oglethorpe.

The tornado was rated as a strong EF3 on the Enhanced Fujita Scale. In total, the tornado cut a path up to one mile (1.6 km) wide and about 40 miles (64 km) long through Webster, Sumter and Macon Counties. Two people died and 11 injured. Total damage was estimated at over $111 million, $110 million in Sumter county and $1 million in Webster County. Approximately 1,238 buildings (1,235 in Sumter and 3 in Webster), hundreds of vehicles, and much other property were damaged or destroyed.

== Non-tornadic impacts ==
On the other side of the low-pressure area, a significant blizzard occurred over the northern Great Plains and Upper Midwest, including parts of Minnesota, Manitoba, Saskatchewan, Wisconsin, Iowa and Nebraska, where several snowfalls in excess of 8 to 18 inches (20 to 46 centimetres) were reported, as well as snow of between 6 and 11 inches (15 and 28 centimetres) across portions of Ontario and Quebec. Freezing rain was reported across New England, the lower Great Lakes in Ontario, Michigan, and in the Chicago area. 19 people were killed by the storm, including two in Manitoba, two in Ontario, one in Massachusetts, four in North Dakota, one in Minnesota, three in Michigan, five in Wisconsin and one in Nebraska. The University of Minnesota in the Twin Cities was closed for the first time since 1991 and the roof of a supermarket in Wisconsin collapsed. Minnesota Governor Tim Pawlenty called in the National Guard while governors Chet Culver (Iowa) and Michael Rounds (South Dakota) issued disaster declarations.

== Aftermath ==
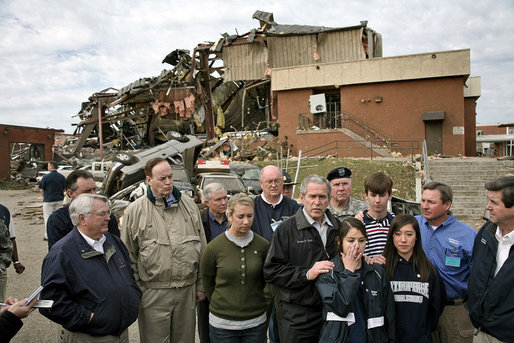
President Bush talks with the media after walking through the tornado damage at Enterprise High School.

Shortly after the tornado near Enterprise, Alabama subsided, Governor Bob Riley deployed over 100 National Guard troops, with additional forces on standby. President George W. Bush declared Enterprise a Disaster Area, and FEMA provided extensive assistance in cleanup operations and the establishment of temporary shelters. A curfew was enforced from dawn to dusk. In the aftermath, an investigation was launched to assess whether students should have been dismissed before the storm occurred.

The Alabama National Guard being deployed to Enterprise for recovery efforts following the tornado.

However, a survey conducted by the National Weather Service office in Tallahassee indicated that the death toll could have been substantially higher due to the extensive damage sustained in the parking lot and surrounding areas. Additionally, earlier thunderstorm activity in the region, including two other rotating supercells moving toward Enterprise later that morning, made evacuation efforts unsafe.

After the tornado, there was an investigation into whether the students should have been dismissed before the tornado struck the school. However, the National Weather Service survey from the office in Tallahassee suggested that the death toll could have been much higher due to the extreme damage in the parking lot and the area nearby. In addition, earlier thunderstorm activity in the area with two other rotating supercells tracking towards Enterprise late that morning (the first tornado warning was issued at 10:41 am CST) made evacuating the area unsafe.

A subsequent service assessment by the NWS determined that the school had implemented effective safety measures to minimize and prevent potential loss of life as the tornado approached, confirming that students were positioned in the safest area of the building. However, the assessment recommended the addition of hardened “safe rooms” with reinforced construction to further mitigate the impact of future disasters involving large and violent tornadoes striking substantial structures. A comparable tornado on July 13, 2004, in Roanoke, Illinois, destroyed an industrial facility; however, the presence of such rooms ensured that no one present in the room sustained minor or serious injuries. The school moved to a different location shortly after the storm, and opened again in during the 2010-2011 school year, with the former site becoming an elementary school.

Enterprise was hit again by a weaker EF1 tornado a year later on October 8, 2008; however, no one was seriously injured or killed.

== See also ==
- Weather of 2007
- List of North American tornadoes and tornado outbreaks
- List of F4 and EF4 tornadoes
  - List of F4 and EF4 tornadoes (2000–2009)
- List of tornado-related deaths at schools
- Tornado outbreak of February 28 – March 1, 2017
