= Eric Winters (American football) =

American football player (born 2006)

No. 5 – Auburn Tigers
- Position: Safety
- Class: Sophomore

Personal information
- Born: December 20, 2006 (age 19)
- Listed height: 6 ft 0 in (1.83 m)
- Listed weight: 215 lb (98 kg)

Career information
- High school: Enterprise (Enterprise, Alabama)
- College: Auburn (2025–present)
- Stats at ESPN

Eric Winters (born December 20, 2006) is an American football safety for the Auburn Tigers.

== Early life ==
Winters attended Enterprise High School in Enterprise, Alabama. He earned first-team all-state honors in both football and basketball. In football, Winters was rated as a four-star recruit, the 7th overall safety, and the 65th overall player in the class of 2025 by 247Sports, and committed to play college football for the Auburn Tigers over offers from Georgia, Miami, and Tennessee.

== College career ==
In week one of the 2025 season, Winters notched three tackles in a win over Baylor. He finished his freshman season in 2025 with 29 tackles with two for a loss, a sack, and a pass deflection. After the season, Winters announced his return to the Tigers for the 2026 season.
