= EDN =

EDN may refer to:

- EDN (magazine), originally Electrical Design News
- Eden Park railway station, in London
- Endothelin
- Enterprise Municipal Airport (Alabama)
- Eosinophil-derived neurotoxin
- Europe of Nations, a political group in European Parliament
- Extensible Data Notation, a file format
