= Jimmy McClain =

American football player (born 1980)

No. 51, 59
- Position: Linebacker

Personal information
- Born: July 23, 1980; Enterprise, Alabama, U.S.
- Listed height: 6 ft 0 in (1.83 m)
- Listed weight: 231 lb (105 kg)

Career information
- High school: Enterprise (AL)
- College: Troy State
- NFL draft: 2002: undrafted

Career history
- Houston Texans (2002–2003); Jacksonville Jaguars (2004–2005); → Scottish Claymores (2004)

Awards and highlights
- All-NFL Europe (2004)
- Stats at Pro Football Reference

Jimmy McClain (born July 23, 1980) is an American former professional football linebacker who played three seasons in the National Football League (NFL) with the Houston Texans and Jacksonville Jaguars. He played college football at Troy State University and attended Enterprise High School in Enterprise, Alabama. He was also a member of the Scottish Claymores of NFL Europe.

== Professional career ==
McClain was signed by the Houston Texans on April 23, 2002. He was released by the Texans on September 2, 2003 and re-signed on September 10, 2003. He was released by the Texans on November 17, 2003. McClain was credited with a safety on December 15, 2002 against the Baltimore Ravens. On December 22, 2002 against the Washington Redskins, he became the first person in Houston Texans history to block a punt.

McClain was signed by the Jacksonville Jaguars on January 27, 2004. He was allocated to the Scottish Claymores for the 2004 season. He was named to the All-NFL Europe League Team in 2004. McClain was released by the Jaguars on September 4, 2004. He was signed by the Jaguars on November 10 and released on November 30, 2004. He was signed by the Jaguars on August 13 and released on August 27, 2005. He was re-signed by the Jaguars on August 31 and released on September 3, 2005.
