= T. J. Barnes =

American football player (born 1990)

T.J. Barnes
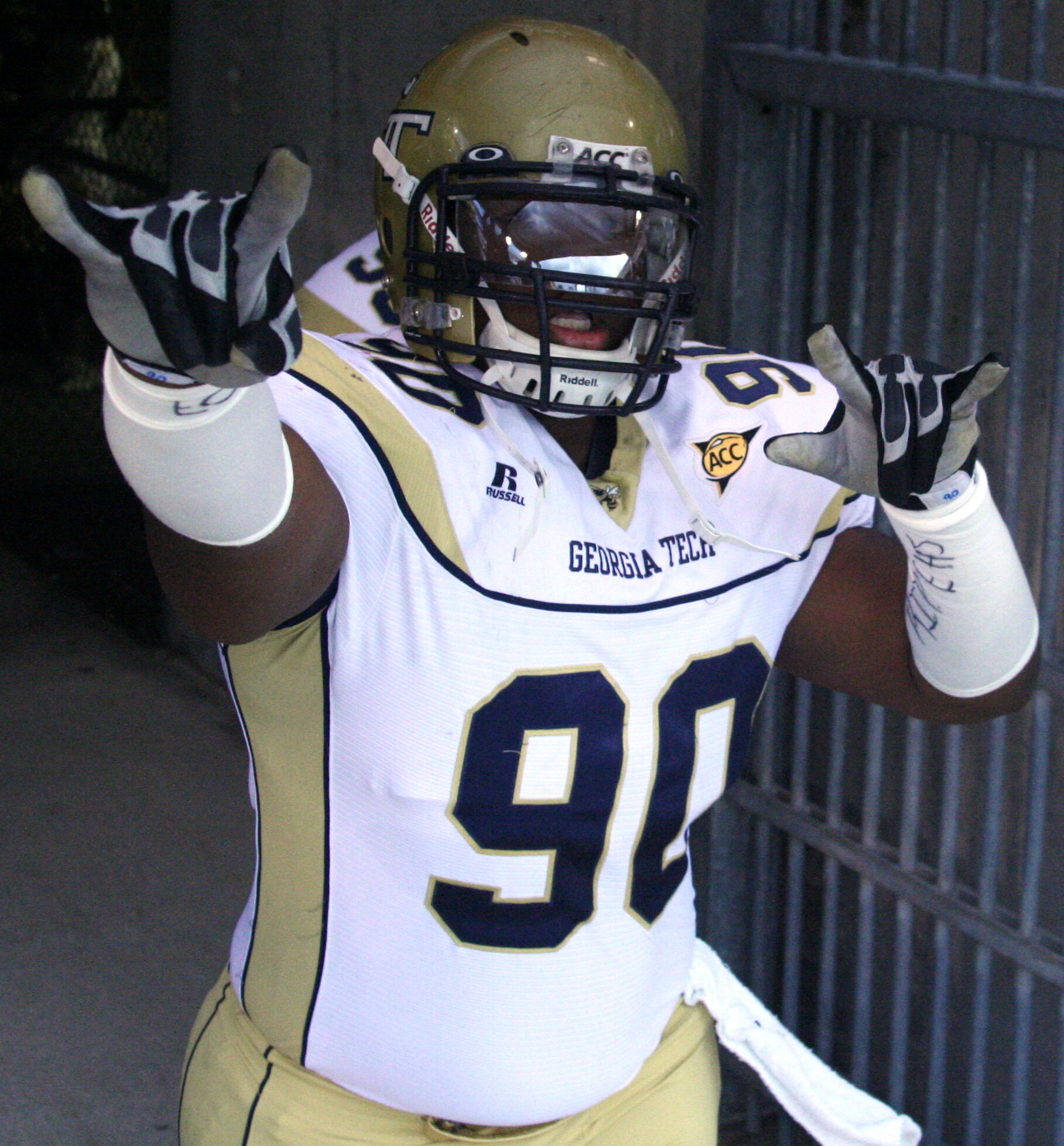
- Barnes with the Georgia Tech Yellow Jackets in 2009

No. 99, 90, 77, 72
- Position: Defensive tackle

Personal information
- Born: June 14, 1990 (age 36); Montgomery, Alabama, U.S.
- Listed height: 6 ft 7 in (2.01 m)
- Listed weight: 358 lb (162 kg)

Career information
- High school: Enterprise (Enterprise, Alabama)
- College: Georgia Tech
- NFL draft: 2013: undrafted

Career history
- Jacksonville Jaguars (2013)*; New York Jets (2013–2015); Buffalo Bills (2015); Jacksonville Jaguars (2016)*; Kansas City Chiefs (2016); Saskatchewan Roughriders (2017); Atlanta Legends (2019); Carolina Panthers (2019)*; New York Guardians (2020); Massachusetts Pirates (2021); Arlington Renegades (2023); DC Defenders (2024)
- * Offseason or practice squad member only

Awards and highlights
- XFL champion (2023)

Career NFL statistics
- Total tackles: 9
- Pass deflections: 1
- Stats at Pro Football Reference

Terence Jariviz Barnes (born June 14, 1990) is an American former professional football player who was a defensive tackle in the National Football League (NFL) and Canadian Football League (CFL). He played college football for the Georgia Tech Yellow Jackets. He signed with the NFL's Jacksonville Jaguars as an undrafted free agent in 2013, and has also played for the New York Jets, Buffalo Bills, Carolina Panthers, Atlanta Legends, New York Guardians, Massachusetts Pirates, Arlington Renegades, and DC Defenders.

== Early life ==
Barnes attended Enterprise High School. He was ranked as the 48th-best offensive tackle prospect nationally by Rivals.com and also was ranked by Rivals.com as the 18th-best prep prospect in the state of Alabama.

== College career ==
Barnes was selected to the Sporting News 2009 ACC All-Freshman Team following his Freshman season. He was a 2012 All-ACC Honorable Mention. He was selected to participate in the 2012 Raycom Collegiate All-Star Game.

== Professional career ==
Pre-draft measurables
Height	Weight	Arm length	Hand span	40-yard dash	10-yard split	20-yard split	20-yard shuttle	Three-cone drill	Vertical jump	Broad jump	Bench press
6 ft 6 1/4 in (1.99 m)	369 lb (167 kg)	34 7/8 in (0.89 m)	10 3/4 in (0.27 m)	5.30 s	1.89 s	3.12 s	4.96 s	8.26 s	22.0 in (0.56 m)	8 ft 1 in (2.46 m)	25 reps
All values from NFL Combine

=== Jacksonville Jaguars (first stint) ===
On April 27, 2013, Barnes signed with the Jacksonville Jaguars as an undrafted free agent. On August 30, 2013, he was released.

=== New York Jets ===
On October 9, 2013, Barnes was signed by the New York Jets to join the practice squad. In 2014, Barnes made the 53-man roster, playing in 6 games for the Jets and recording 4 Tackles. In 2015, Barnes played in 6 games with the Jets, recording 3 tackles. The Jets released Barnes on November 12, 2015.

=== Buffalo Bills ===
On November 30, 2015, Barnes signed with the Buffalo Bills. Barnes played in 4 games, Starting 1 game, and recording 1 tackle on the season. On August 15, 2016, Barnes was released by the Bills.

=== Jacksonville Jaguars (second stint) ===
On August 17, 2016, Barnes was claimed off waivers by the Jaguars. On September 3, 2016, he was released by the Jaguars.

=== Kansas City Chiefs ===
On October 20, Barnes was signed to the Kansas City Chiefs practice squad. He was promoted to the active roster on December 3, 2016. He was released by the Chiefs on June 9, 2017.

=== Atlanta Legends ===
In September 2018, Barnes signed with Atlanta Legends of the Alliance of American Football for the 2019 season.

=== Carolina Panthers ===
After the AAF suspended football operations, Barnes signed with the Carolina Panthers on April 8, 2019. He was waived on June 11, 2019.

=== New York Guardians ===
Barnes was selected in the 4th round during phase three in the 2020 XFL draft by the New York Guardians. He had his contract terminated when the league suspended operations on April 10, 2020.

=== Massachusetts Pirates ===
Barnes signed with the Massachusetts Pirates on October 7, 2020. Barnes announced his retirement from football on December 18, 2020, but was activated off of the Retired list on June 29, 2021.

=== Arlington Renegades ===
On November 17, 2022, Barnes came out of retirement, and was drafted by the Arlington Renegades of the XFL. Barnes lost nearly 70 pounds to get back in shape for the XFL, weighing nearly 420 pounds around Thanksgiving. After winning the 2023 XFL Championship, Barnes announced his retirement from football again on May 14, 2023, on his Instagram, finishing the season with 10 tackles and two sacks.

=== DC Defenders ===
On January 15, 2024, Barnes was selected by the DC Defenders in the third round of the Super Draft portion of the 2024 UFL dispersal draft. He signed with the team on January 22.
