= Enterprise High School (Alabama) =

Coordinates: 31.32384°N 85.85341°W

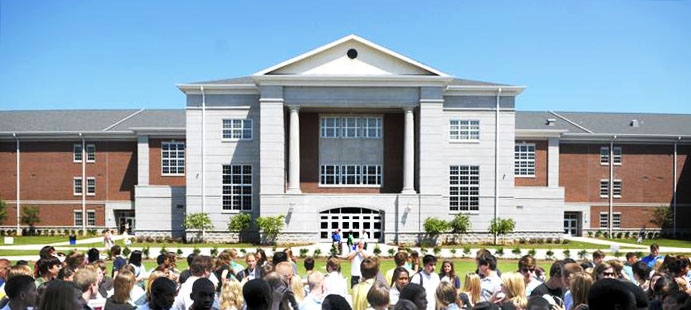

Location
- 1811 Boll Weevil Circle; Enterprise, Alabama 36330; United States

Information
- Type: Public
- Established: 1958 (68 years ago)
- Status: Active
- Superintendent: Zel Thomas
- CEEB code: 010980
- Principal: Stan Sauls
- Teaching staff: 120.00 (FTE)
- Grades: 9-12
- Enrollment: 2,121 (2023-2024)
- Student to teacher ratio: 17.68
- Campus type: Suburban
- Colors: Blue and white
- Song: "EHS Fight Song"
- Mascot: Wildcat
- Team name: Wildcats
- Communities served: Fort Rucker
- Website: ehs.enterpriseschools.net

Enterprise High School is a 7A public high school at 1801 Boll Weevil Circle in Enterprise, Coffee County, Alabama, USA, in the Enterprise City School District. The school houses grades 9-12.

Enterprise City is one of three municipal school systems that take on-post Fort Rucker families at the secondary level.

== 2010 building ==
The city of Enterprise approved the rebuilding of Enterprise High School at a new location on the northwestern side of town off of Boll Weevil Circle, the city's main bypass. The school was constructed with more than $45 million in disaster relief funding from FEMA, insurance settlements, and state approved grant money. The town also approved a sales tax increase to collect funds for school construction. Overall, The result was construction of an $86 million replacement school. The new Enterprise High, at 525,000 square feet, is one of the largest schools in the Southeast.

On August 23, 2010, the doors of the new Enterprise High School opened to students. It was the first time in more than three years that High School students in Enterprise had been able to attend school in a High School building. Since March 2007, they had been sharing the campus of Enterprise State Community College with the local college students. The start of school year for all schools in the City of Enterprise had been delayed for two weeks to ensure that the High School building (the only public High School in town) would be ready for the first day of school.

The streets surrounding the campus were named just prior to the first day of school. Woodham Drive was named after John W. Woodham, an architect who worked with the school system for 25 years. Ralls drive was named after John G. Ralls, who sold more than 137 acres (0.55 km^{2}) of land to the school system for the construction of the new school, and then donated a portion of the sale price back to the school. A third road was named after Webe Curenton, who sold his property to the school so that a driveway could be built connecting the school with Main Street. Wild Cat Way, the road surrounding the perimeter of the school, was named after the school's "Wildcat" mascot.

== March 2007 tornado ==
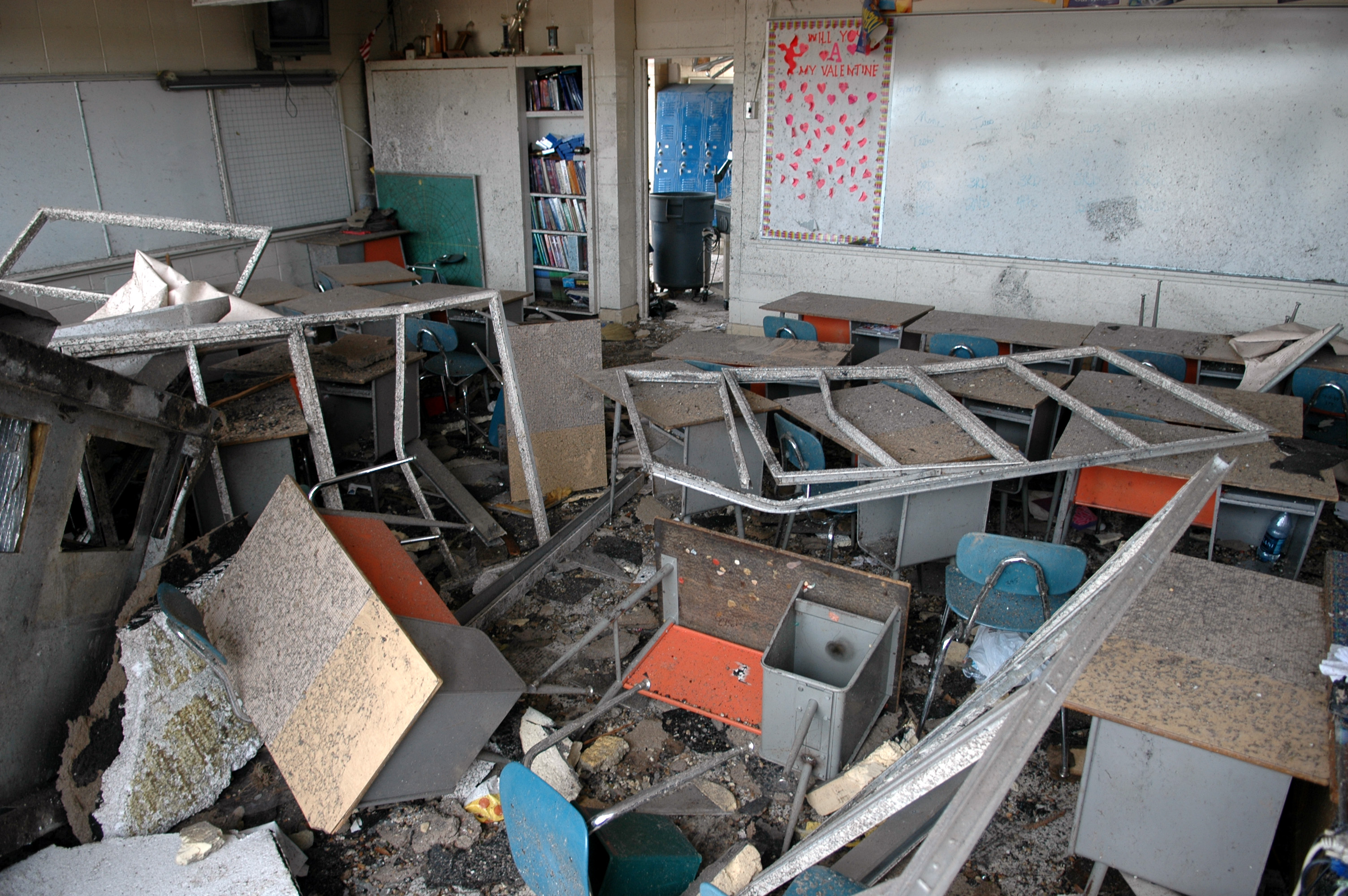
Damaged class room after the tornado

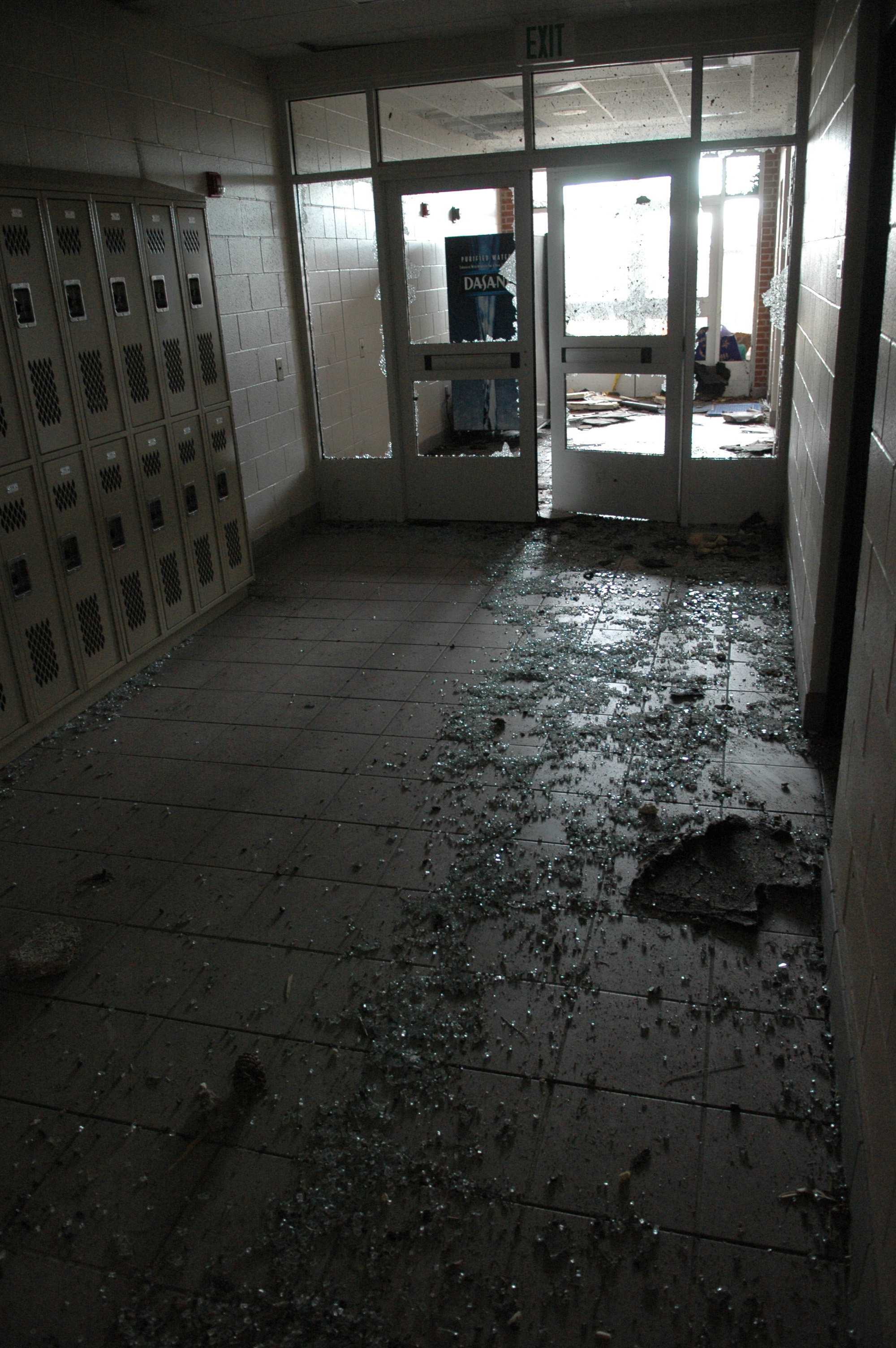
Damaged hallway after the tornado

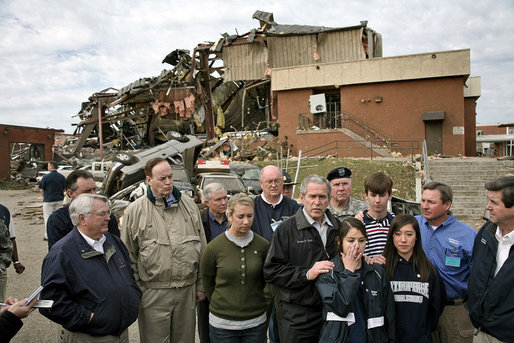
President Bush, with Senator Richard Shelby and Governor Bob Riley looking on, talks with the media after walking through the tornado damage at Enterprise High School.

On March 1, 2007, Enterprise High School was hit by an EF4 tornado during the February–March 2007 Tornado Outbreak. The twister collapsed parts of the building's science wing, third hallway and new gym, while causing severe damage in other areas of the school after impacting near Enterprise's municipal airport. The parking lot designated "Blue" was severely damaged, with cars stacked on each other. Cars in the other school parking lots were also damaged. Early news reports indicated that 20% of the building was damaged, and numerous students were injured. reported eight fatalities at the school as of 8:30 p.m. CST on the evening of the storm; earlier reports had set the death toll as high as 22, later scaled back to five. The death toll was increased again the following day to eight as recovery efforts went onward. The final death toll was set at nine, including Ryan Mohler, Peter Dunn, AJ Jackson, Jamie Vidensek, Michael Bowen, Mikey Tompkins, Katie Strunk, Michelle Wilson, and an elderly woman named Edna Strickland. It was the first killer tornado at a US school since 1993.

After the tornado, the school was relocated to Enterprise-Ozark Community College (later renamed Enterprise State Community College), where it remained until the new school building was completed in August 2010.

The song "Held In His Love" by The Springs was written by Stewart Halcomb, a student inside Enterprise High School (Alabama) on March 1, 2007, and dedicated to the eight friends he lost that day.

In response to the tornado, Rachael Ray helped with the catering costs associated with the school's annual senior prom event (which was subsequently featured on the April 30, 2007, episode of her television show). After a night of dancing to the music of a DJ, Rachael Ray surprised students by arranging an unexpected musical performance by Mandy Moore.

On May 3, 2007, The Red Jumpsuit Apparatus, The Skyline Drive, Course of Nature, May-Day, The Springs (band), and Brandon Kelly set up Band-Aid Benefit Concert sponsored by 106.7 WKMX in Fort Rucker, Alabama to help raise money for the high school. Along with The Red Jumpsuit Apparatus and Course of Nature, Melissa Joan Hart supported husband, Mark Wilkerson of CON and the high school.

== Desegregation ==
Enterprise High School was affected historically by desegregation efforts within Alabama. Six families in Enterprise integrated the public schools in the 1966 school year. Children were given "Freedom of Choice forms" to bring home for their parents to complete the year before. These six families chose the white schools. The first year was peaceful without incident. A few years later the all black elementary school was closed and the all black high school was changed to 7th grade only. By the Fall of 1970, the school's total enrollment of 1,131 numbered 182 African-American and 949 other students. At the same time, the school had eight African-American teachers and 45 other teachers on its 53-member faculty.

== Notable alumni ==
- T. J. Barnes, former NFL defensive back
- Katie Britt, politician, United States Senator from Alabama (2023–present)
- Brendan Donovan, MLB utility player for the Seattle Mariners (2026-present) and St. Louis Cardinals (2022-2026)
- Zion Grady, college football defensive end for the Ohio State Buckeyes
- Marcus Jones, NFL cornerback for the New England Patriots who played college football at Troy and Houston
- Jimmy McClain, former NFL linebacker for the Houston Texans and the Jacksonville Jaguars
- Josh McCray, college football running back for the Illinois Fighting Illini and Georgia Bulldogs
- Barry Moore, politician, United States Congressman from Alabama (2020–present)
- Björn Nittmo, former NFL placekicker
- R. J. Roberts, former CFL player who played college football at Troy University
- Cedric Smith, former NFL running back, assistant strength & conditioning coach for the Dallas Cowboys
- Mark Wilkerson, former lead singer of Course of Nature, husband of Melissa Joan Hart
- Eric Winters, college football safety for the Auburn Tigers
