= Enterprise City Schools =

School district in Alabama, United States

The Enterprise City School District is a public school district based in the city of Enterprise, Alabama (USA).

It is also one of three municipal school systems that take Fort Rucker (formerly Fort Novosel) families at the secondary level.

== Schools ==
=== High school ===
- Grades 9-12
  - Enterprise High School https://www.enterpriseschools.net/ehs

=== Junior high schools ===
- Grades 7 and 8
  - Dauphin Junior High School https://www.enterpriseschools.net/Domain/16
  - Coppinville Junior High School https://www.enterpriseschools.net/Domain/15

=== Elementary schools ===
- Grades 1-6
  - Harrand Creek Elementary School https://www.enterpriseschools.net/Domain/10
  - Hillcrest Elementary School https://www.enterpriseschools.net/Domain/11
  - Holly Hill Elementary School https://www.enterpriseschools.net/Domain/12
  - Pinedale Elementary School https://www.enterpriseschools.net/Domain/13
  - Rucker Blvd. Elementary School https://www.enterpriseschools.net/Domain/14

=== Other Campuses ===
- Pre-K and Kindergarten
  - Enterprise Early Education Center https://www.enterpriseschools.net/Domain/9
- Performance Intervention Program
  - Temporary Alternative Placement https://www.enterpriseschools.net/Domain/17
- Career and Technology Education
  - Enterprise Career and Technology Center https://www.enterpriseschools.net/domain/346
