= Cedric Smith (American football) =

American football player and coach (born 1968)

Dallas Cowboys
- Title: Assistant strength & conditioning coach

Personal information
- Born: May 27, 1968 (age 58); Enterprise, Alabama, U.S.
- Listed height: 5 ft 11 in (1.80 m)
- Listed weight: 250 lb (113 kg)

Career information
- Position: Fullback (No. 30, 37, 34, 45)
- High school: Enterprise
- College: Florida
- NFL draft: 1990: 5th round, 131st overall pick

Career history

Playing
- Minnesota Vikings (1990); New Orleans Saints (1991); Miami Dolphins (1993)*; Washington Redskins (1994–1995); Arizona Cardinals (1996–1998)
- * Offseason or practice squad member only

Coaching
- Denver Broncos (2001–2006) Assistant strength & conditioning; Kansas City Chiefs (2007–2009) Head strength & conditioning; Houston Texans (2010–2013) Head strength & conditioning; Denver Broncos (2017–2020) Assistant strength & conditioning; Dallas Cowboys (2021-present) Assistant strength & conditioning

Career NFL statistics
- Rushing yards: 100
- Rushing average: 2.5
- Receptions: 20
- Receiving yards: 141
- Total touchdowns: 4
- Stats at Pro Football Reference

Cedric Delon Smith (born May 27, 1968) is an American former professional football player who was a fullback for six seasons in the National Football League (NFL) during the 1990s. Smith played college football for the Florida Gators, and thereafter, he played in the NFL for the Minnesota Vikings, New Orleans Saints, Washington Redskins and Arizona Cardinals. Smith was an assistant strength & conditioning coach with the Denver Broncos from 2017 to 2020. He is currently the head assistant strength and conditioning coach of the Dallas Cowboys. He is entering his 15th season as an NFL strength and conditioning coach, Smith has seven years of experience leading the strength and conditioning programs for the Houston Texans from 2010 to 2013 and the Kansas City Chiefs from 2007 to 2009.

== Early life ==
Smith was born in Enterprise, Alabama, in 1968. He attended Enterprise High School, where he was an honor student and standout running back for the Enterprise Wildcats high school football team.

== College career ==
Smith accepted an athletic scholarship to attend the University of Florida in Gainesville, Florida, where he played fullback for coach Galen Hall's Florida Gators football team from 1986 to 1989. He was the primary blocking back for featured tailback Emmitt Smith in 1987, 1988 and 1989, and was also a team captain as a senior in 1989. Smith was recognized as a Southeastern Conference (SEC) Academic Honor Roll honoree in 1987, 1988 and 1989, and he graduated with a bachelor's degree in public health in 1990.

== Professional career ==
Pre-draft measurables
Height	Weight	Arm length	Hand span	40-yard dash	10-yard split	20-yard split	20-yard shuttle	Vertical jump	Broad jump	Bench press
5 ft 10 1/8 in (1.78 m)	223 lb (101 kg)	30 1/8 in (0.77 m)	9 1/4 in (0.23 m)	4.65 s	1.65 s	2.73 s	4.31 s	35.5 in (0.90 m)	9 ft 2 in (2.79 m)	25 reps

The Minnesota Vikings selected Smith in the fifth round (131st pick overall) of the 1990 NFL draft. He played for the Vikings for a single season in 1990. Smith played for the New Orleans Saints in 1991

After two seasons out of the NFL, Smith signed with the Washington Redskins and played in twenty games between the 1994 and 1995 seasons. He played his final two NFL seasons for the Arizona Cardinals in 1996 and 1997, appearing in thirty-one games. After colliding with Pat Tillman in practice, he tore his PCL and ACL, landing him on injured reserve for the whole 1998 season. In his six-season NFL career, Smith played in 72 games and started 14 of them. He totaled 40 rushes for 100 yards with two touchdowns to go along with 20 receptions for 141 yards and two scores.

== Coaching career ==
Smith is currently the assistant strength and conditioning coach for the Dallas Cowboys, having spent the previous four seasons as an assistant with the Denver Broncos, three seasons directing the Kansas City Chiefs and four seasons directing the Houston Texans as head strength and conditioning coach. Smith was recognized as the NFL Strength and Conditioning Coach of the Year by the league's strength and conditioning coaches in 2012.

== See also ==
- Florida Gators football, 1980–89
- List of Florida Gators in the NFL draft
- List of New Orleans Saints players
- List of University of Florida alumni
- List of Washington Redskins players
