= Enterprise Municipal Airport (Alabama) =

Public-use airport in Enterprise, Alabama

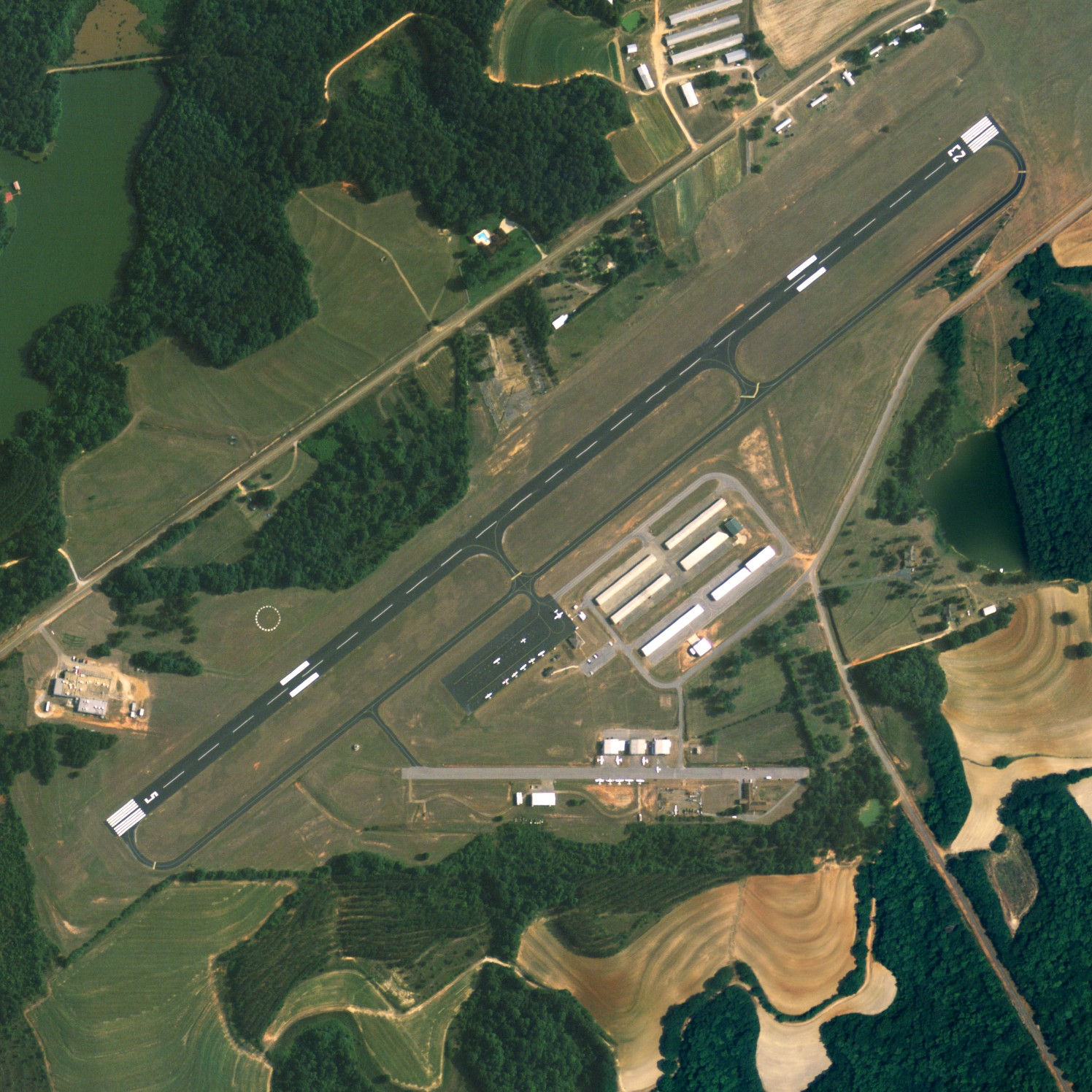
- NAIP aerial image, June 2006
- IATA: ETS; ICAO: KEDN; FAA LID: EDN

Summary
- Airport type: Public
- Owner: City of Enterprise
- Serves: Enterprise, Alabama
- Elevation AMSL: 361 ft (110 m)
- Coordinates: 31°17′59″N 085°53′59″W
- Website: www.enterpriseal.gov/airport

Map
- Location of airport in Alabama EDN (the United States)

Runways
Direction	Length		Surface
Direction	ft	m	Surface
5/23	5,080	1,548	Asphalt

Statistics (2017)
- Aircraft operations: 43,456
- Based aircraft: 74
- Sources: FAA and City of Enterprise

Enterprise Municipal Airport (IATA: ETS, ICAO: KEDN, FAA LID: EDN) is a city-owned, public-use airport located three nautical miles (6 km) west of the central business district of Enterprise, a city in Coffee County, Alabama, United States. It is included in the National Plan of Integrated Airport Systems for 2011–2015, which categorized it as a general aviation facility.

This airport is assigned a three-letter location identifier of EDN by the Federal Aviation Administration, but the International Air Transport Association (IATA) airport code is ETS.

An EF4 tornado impacted near this area on March 1, 2007 before destroying the high school.

== Facilities and aircraft ==
Enterprise Municipal Airport covers an area of 90 acres (36 ha) at an elevation of 361 feet (110 m) above mean sea level. It has one runway designated 5/23 with an asphalt surface measuring 5,080 by 100 feet (1,548 x 30 m).

For the 12-month period ending January 25, 2010, the airport had 43,456 aircraft operations, an average of 119 per day: 58% military and 42% general aviation. At that time there were 52 aircraft based at this airport: 81% single-engine, 14% multi-engine, 2% helicopter, and 4% ultralight.

== See also ==
- List of airports in Alabama
