= The Springs =

- Origin: Alabama, United States
- Genres: Country
- Years active: 2013-present
- Label: CFC/Unsigned
- Members: Stewart Halcomb; Holly (Helms) Halcomb
- Website: http://www.thespringsband.com

The Springs is an American country music husband/wife duo composed of Stewart Halcomb from Enterprise, Alabama (male vocals) and Holly Halcomb from New Market, Alabama (female vocals). The Springs have now moved to Nashville.

Holly and Stewart met at the world-famous The Bluebird Cafe shortly after each of them moved to Nashville in 2011 and were later engaged there in 2013. The couple were later married in their home state of Alabama in 2015.

The Springs' debut album was released in 2014 with 9 of the 12 songs written or co-written by Stewart and/or Holly. Later in June 2014, The Springs released an EP entitled "Dance With Me" that debuted at #42 on the Billboard Country Album sells chart. This helped them to gain the attention and support of Spotify, including being added to the "Discover Weekly" Playlist. Since that time, they have eclipsed plays of 1+ million, and continue to gain momentum through social media.

The Springs have been consulted by Rick Barker, Taylor Swift's former manager, and have recently gained much success with his help.

== Discography ==
=== Albums ===
Title	Album details	Peak chart positions		Sales
Title	Album details	US Indie	US Heat	Sales
The Springs	Release date: June 13, 2014; Label: CFC Productions	—	—	
Old Fashioned	Release date: June 8, 2018; Label: CFC Productions	33	10	US: 900
"—" denotes releases that did not chart

=== Extended plays ===
Title	Details	Peak chart positions	
Title	Details	US Country	US Heat
Dance with Me	Release date: June 10, 2016; Label: CFC Productions	42	20
