= Enterprise, Alabama =

City in Coffee County, Alabama, US

- City
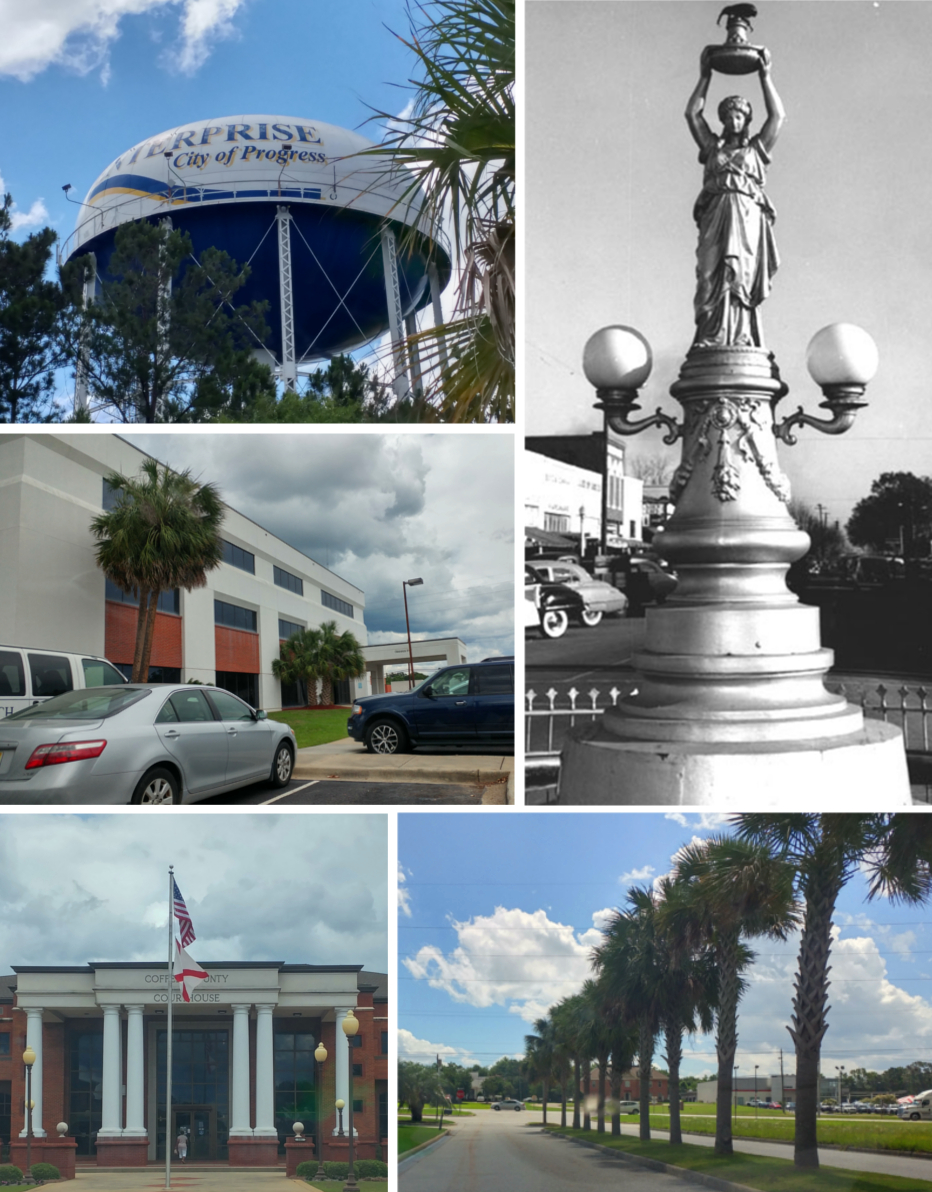
- Clockwise from top-left: The Enterprise Water Tower, the Boll Weevil Monument, Boll Weevil Circle, Coffee County Courthouse, Enterprise Hospital.

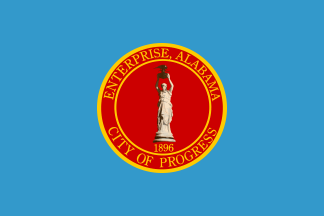
- Flag Seal
- Motto(s): "City of Progress" "Retirement City USA"
- Location of Enterprise in Coffee County and Dale County, Alabama.
- Coordinates: 31°21′40″N 85°51′25″W
- Country: United States
- State: Alabama
- Counties: Coffee, Dale
- Founded: 1896

Area
  - Total: 31.02 sq mi (80.35 km^{2})
  - Land: 30.96 sq mi (80.18 km^{2})
  - Water: 0.066 sq mi (0.17 km^{2})
- Elevation: 305 ft (93 m)

Population (2020)
  - Total: 28,711
  - Density: 927.4/sq mi (358.08/km^{2})
- Time zone: UTC-6 (CST)
  - Summer (DST): UTC-5 (CDT)
- ZIP Code: 36330–36331
- Area code: 334
- FIPS code: 01-24184
- GNIS feature ID: 2403567
- Website: www.enterpriseal.gov

Enterprise is a city in the southeastern part of Coffee County and the southwestern part of Dale County in Southeastern Alabama, United States. Its population was 28,711 at the 2020 census. Enterprise is the primary city of the Enterprise micropolitan statistical area (with the portion of the city in Dale County part of the Ozark micropolitan statistical area). It was originally a part of Enterprise–Ozark micropolitan area before being split; for a longer while it was originally part of the Dothan-Enterprise-Ozark combined statistical area but is now its own separate primary statistical area in later censuses.

Enterprise is famous for the Boll Weevil Monument, a large monument of a woman holding a boll weevil, in the middle of Main Street. The city erected the statue because the destruction of the cotton crop by the boll weevil had led to agricultural diversity, starting with peanuts and more prosperity than had ever come from cotton alone. It is the only statue to an insect pest in the world. Enterprise is right outside the U.S. Army's Fort Rucker, the home of Army Aviation.

Enterprise is home to Enterprise State Community College.

== History ==
=== Founding and the Boll Weevil Monument ===
The founder of Enterprise, John Henry Carmichael, first settled there in 1881. Carmichael opened a store, which attracted more settlers to the area, and by the next year, a post office was relocated from the settlement of Drake Eye to the north to Enterprise. In 1896, with 250 people having settled there, the city of Enterprise incorporated. Soon afterward, the Alabama Midland Railway came to Enterprise, bringing with it opportunities for commerce and growth. By 1906, its population had grown to 3,750.

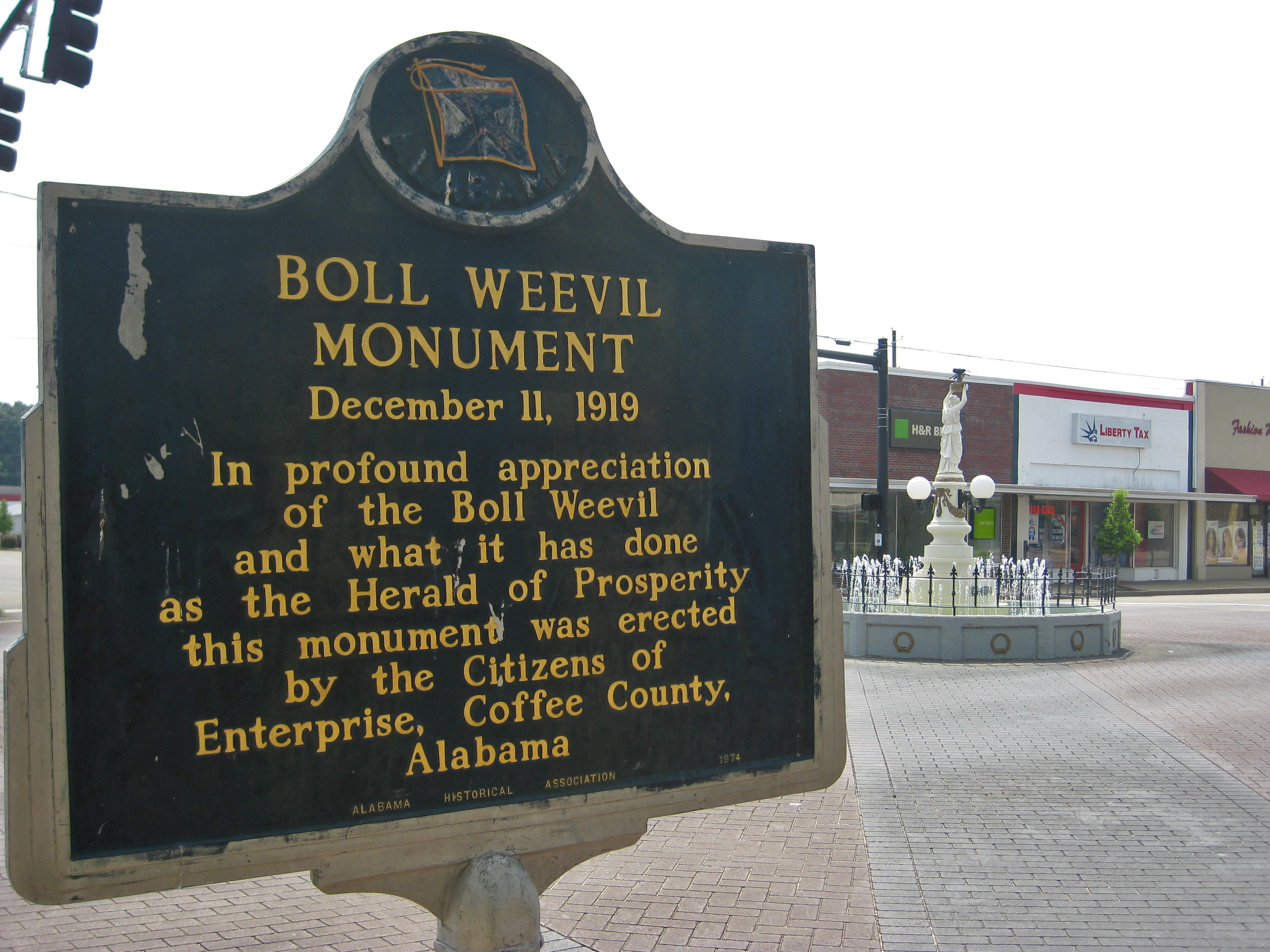
Historical marker and Boll Weevil Monument in Downtown Enterprise

Enterprise's way of life came under threat in 1915. An infestation of boll weevils found its way into the region's cotton crops, resulting in the destruction of most of the cotton in Coffee County. Facing economic ruin, the nearly bankrupt area farmers were forced to diversify, planting peanuts and other crops in an effort to lessen the damage and recoup some of their losses.

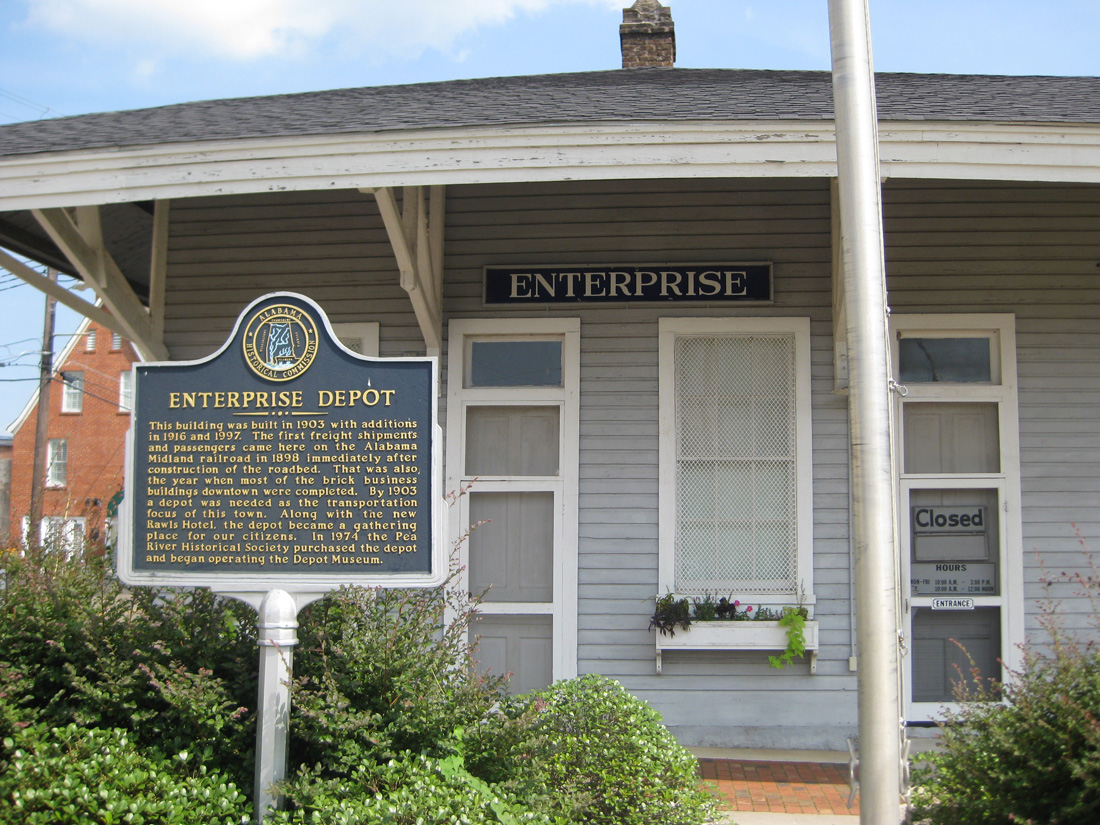
Downtown Enterprise's former Alabama Midland Railway depot, now the Depot Museum

Two years later, Coffee County was the United States' leading producer of peanuts. Not only did Enterprise stave off disaster, but its economy was renewed by the thriving new crop base. In appreciation, the people of Enterprise erected a monument in the city center to what the monument calls their "herald of prosperity", the boll weevil. The Boll Weevil Monument was dedicated on December 11, 1919, as a reminder of how the city adjusted in the face of adversity. It is the only monument to an agricultural pest in the world.

=== March 2007 tornado ===
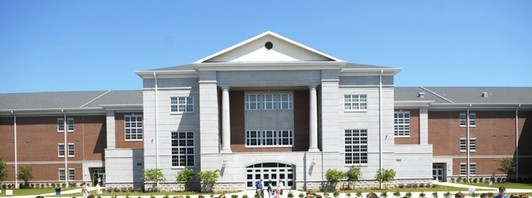
Newly constructed Enterprise High School after the tornado

In the early afternoon of March 1, 2007, Enterprise was struck by a violent EF4 tornado. The tornado caused nine deaths and injured over 121 others. Damage in Enterprise was estimated at nearly $307 million, the worst disaster in the city's history.

The most severe damage occurred at Enterprise High School, where eight students died after a hallway was destroyed and the wall collapsed on them. The students were Michael Bowen (16), Andrew (AJ) Jackson (16), Ryan Mohler (16), Peter Dunn lll (16), Michael (Mikey) Tompkins (17), Jamie Vidensek (17), Michelle Wilson (16) and Kathryn Strunk (16). Enterprise resident Edna Strickland was killed in her home near the high school, the ninth fatality from the tornado. A quarter mile-wide swath through the downtown area was devastated, with at least 647 houses damaged or destroyed. The National Guard was called into the city; a dusk-to-dawn curfew was implemented immediately after the disaster. President Bush arrived the morning of March 3 and immediately declared Coffee County a disaster area. An AmeriCorps team was sent to the city to help organize and participate in disaster relief.

After the tornado, Enterprise High School students attended classes at the local community college, where trailers were used as temporary additional classrooms. The high school was rebuilt on a new site on the west end of Boll Weevil Circle and opened on August 23, 2010, at a cost of over $80 million. The new high school has structurally reinforced safe rooms and areas to shelter during severe weather and is rated to withstand winds from an EF5 tornado.

== Demographics ==
Historical population
Census	Pop.	Note	%±
1900	610		—
1910	2,322		280.7%
1920	3,013		29.8%
1930	3,702		22.9%
1940	4,353		17.6%
1950	7,288		67.4%
1960	11,410		56.6%
1970	15,591		36.6%
1980	18,060		15.8%
1990	20,123		11.4%
2000	21,178		5.2%
2010	26,562		25.4%
2020	28,711		8.1%
2021 (est.)	29,395		2.4%
U.S. Decennial Census

=== Racial and ethnic composition ===
Enterprise city, Alabama – Racial and ethnic composition Note: the US Census treats Hispanic/Latino as an ethnic category. This table excludes Latinos from the racial categories and assigns them to a separate category. Hispanics/Latinos may be of any race.
Race / Ethnicity (NH = Non-Hispanic)	Pop 1980	Pop 1990	Pop 2000	Pop 2010	Pop 2020	% 1980	% 1990	% 2000	% 2010	% 2020
White alone (NH)	14,067	15,140	14,692	17,473	16,840	77.89%	75.24%	69.37%	65.78%	58.65%
Black or African American alone (NH)	3,555	4,252	4,826	5,415	5,789	19.68%	21.13%	22.79%	20.39%	20.16%
Native American or Alaska Native alone (NH)	33	57	100	125	147	0.18%	0.28%	0.47%	0.47%	0.51%
Asian alone (NH)	126	268	338	510	779	0.70%	1.33%	1.60%	1.92%	2.71%
Native Hawaiian or Pacific Islander alone (NH)	x	x	32	44	46	x	x	0.15%	0.17%	0.16%
Other race alone (NH)	29	3	39	35	102	0.16%	0.01%	0.18%	0.13%	0.36%
Mixed race or Multiracial (NH)	x	x	330	632	1,589	x	x	1.56%	2.38%	5.53%
Hispanic or Latino (any race)	250	403	821	2,328	3,419	1.38%	2.00%	3.88%	8.76%	11.91%
Total	18,060	20,123	21,178	26,562	28,711	100.00%	100.00%	100.00%	100.00%	100.00%

=== 2020 census ===
As of the 2020 census, Enterprise had a population of 28,711. The median age was 35.9 years. 25.5% of residents were under the age of 18 and 15.6% of residents were 65 years of age or older. For every 100 females there were 94.4 males, and for every 100 females age 18 and over there were 91.9 males age 18 and over. ! Race !! Number !! Percent

There were 11,350 households and 7,461 families in Enterprise, of which 33.9% had children under the age of 18 living in them. Of all households, 46.2% were married-couple households, 19.2% were households with a male householder and no spouse or partner present, and 29.3% were households with a female householder and no spouse or partner present. About 28.0% of all households were made up of individuals and 10.8% had someone living alone who was 65 years of age or older.

There were 12,531 housing units, of which 9.4% were vacant. The homeowner vacancy rate was 2.9% and the rental vacancy rate was 9.3%.

93.2% of residents lived in urban areas, while 6.8% lived in rural areas.

=== 2010 census ===
As of the 2010 census, 26,562 people, 10,513 households, and 7,196 families resided in the city. The population density was 850 inhabitants per square mile (330/km^{2}). The 11,616 housing units averaged 371.1 per mi^{2} (143.2/km^{2}). The racial makeup of the city was 69.4% White, 20.7% Black or African American, 0.5% Native American, 2.0% Asian, 0.3% Pacific Islander, 4.1% from other races, and 2.9% from two or more races. Hispanics or Latinos of any race were 8.8% of the population.

Of the 10,513 households, 32.2% had children under the age of 18 living with them, 50.3% were married couples living together, 13.9% had a female householder with no husband present, and 31.6% were not families. About 25.6% of all households were made up of individuals, and 8.5% had someone living alone who was 65 years of age or older. The average household size was 2.50, and the average family size was 3.00.

In the city, the age distribution was 25.4% under 18, 9.3% from 18 to 24, 29.1% from 25 to 44, 23.3% from 45 to 64, and 12.9% who were 65 years or older. The median age was 34.2 years. For every 100 females, there were 96.2 males. For every 100 females aged 18 and over, there were 99.6 males.

The median income for a household in the city was $48,042, and the median income for a family was $63,036. Males had a median income of $45,556 versus $31,588 for females. The per capita income for the city was $25,185. About 13.9% of families and 15.6% of the population were below the poverty line, including 23.7% of those under age 18 and 12.9% of those age 65 or over.

=== 2000 census ===
As of the 2000 census, 21,178 people, 8,533 households, and 5,973 families were residing in the city. The population density was 684.2 inhabitants per square mile (264.2/km^{2}). The 9,641 housing units averaged 311.5 per square mile (120.3/km^{2}). The racial makeup of the city was 71.62% White, 22.95% African American, 0.48% Native American, 1.60% Asian, 0.16% Pacific Islander, 1.27% from other races, and 1.92% from two or more races. Hispanics or Latinos of any race were 3.88% of the population.

Of the 8,533 households, 33.1% had children under the age of 18 living with them, 53.6% were married couples living together, 13.3% had a female householder with no husband present, and 30.0% were not families. About 25.7% of all households were made up of individuals, and 9.5% had someone living alone who was 65 years of age or older. The average household size was 2.45 and the average family size was 2.95.

In the city, the age distribution was 25.4% under 18, 9.3% from 18 to 24, 27.5% from 25 to 44, 23.8% from 45 to 64, and 14.1% who were 65 years or older. The median age was 37 years. For every 100 females, there were 91.3 males. For every 100 females aged 18 and over, there were 86.8 males.

The median income for a household in the city was $37,661, and for a family was $45,510. Males had a median income of $37,131 versus $20,560 for females. The per capita income for the city was $20,493. About 10.4% of families and 13.4% of the population were below the poverty line, including 21.0% of those under age 18 and 11.1% of those age 65 or over.

== Education ==
Enterprise is served by Enterprise City Schools. It is also home to Enterprise State Community College, formerly known as Enterprise State Junior College. A two-year college, the Enterprise campus is home to the Boll Weevils.

== Point of interest ==
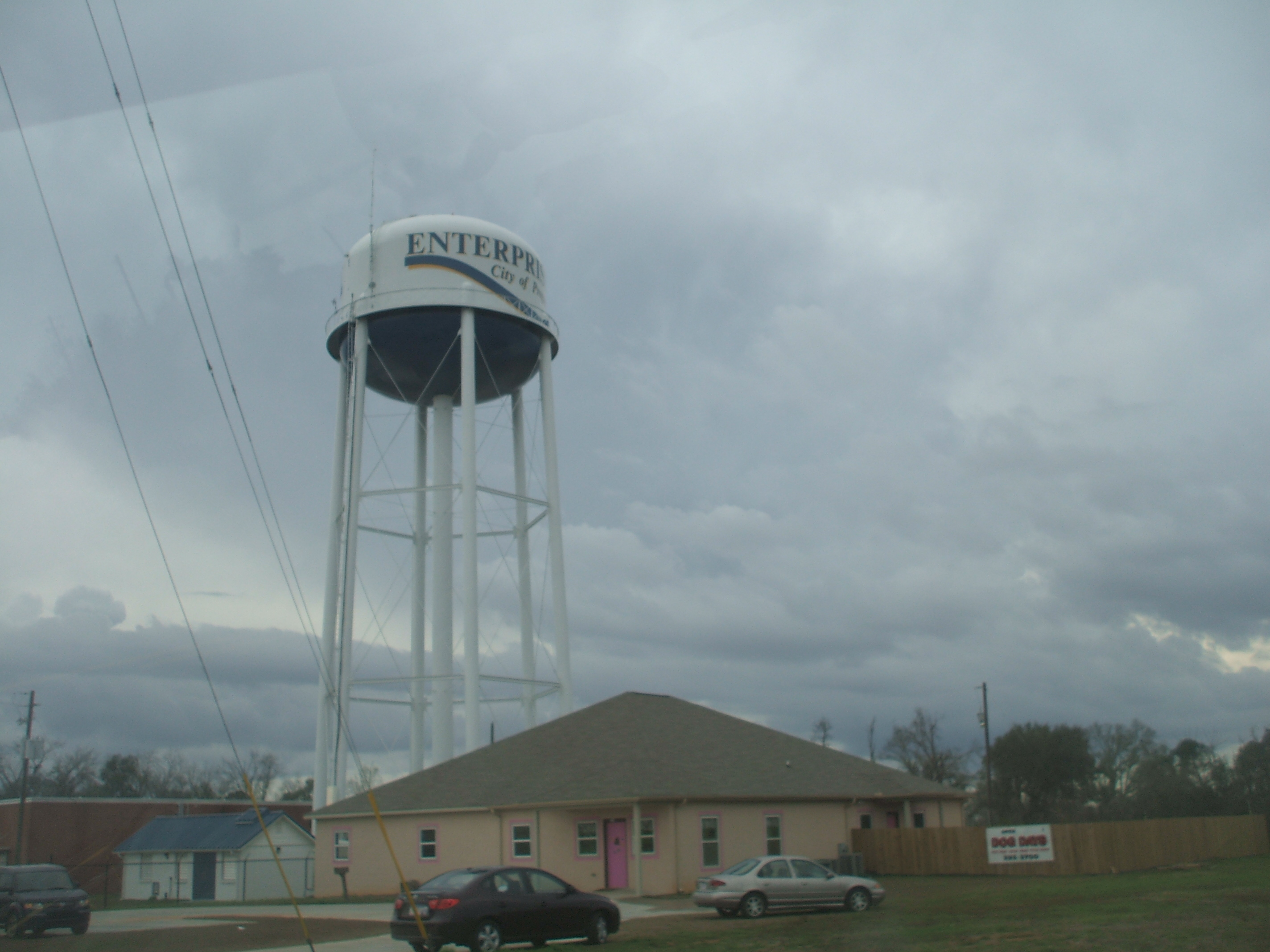
One of the water towers of Enterprise showing the city motto

Murals were produced from 1934 to 1943 in the United States through the Section of Painting and Sculpture, later called the Section of Fine Arts, of the Treasury Department. Paul Theodore Arlt was an artist with the Section of Fine Arts and painted the post office mural, The Section, in the Enterprise post office in 1941. The post office was torn down in 1991, but Arlt's mural, Saturday in Enterprise was preserved and now hangs in the Enterprise Public Library.

Weevil Way is a community art project with a series of 30 boll weevil statues decorated or dressed to represent the local landmarks or businesses where they stand. One of these statues, specifically the statue named "Ronald McWeevil" located at a local McDonalds, ended up going viral online.

== Media ==
A weekly newspaper, The Southeast Sun, had been published since 1982 but is no longer publishing. The Enterprise Ledger is published Tuesday–Friday and Sunday and has been in circulation since 1898.

== Music ==
The song "Your Guardian Angel" by The Red Jumpsuit Apparatus is dedicated to the eight students who lost their lives when a tornado hit the high school. The twister claimed 9 lives and destroyed Enterprise High School. The song "Held In His Love" by The Springs (band) was written by Stewart Halcomb, a student inside Enterprise High School on March 1, 2007, and dedicated to the eight friends he lost that day.

=== BamaJam ===
Enterprise was home to the BamaJam Music Festival featuring multiple acts performing on different stages in three days. Attendance has reached as high as 100,000 each night. In 2008, headliners included Hank Williams, Jr., ZZ Top, Lynyrd Skynyrd, and Trace Adkins, and in 2009, headliners included Taylor Swift, Blake Shelton, Charlie Daniels, Alan Jackson, Brooks and Dunn, The Black Crowes, and Kid Rock.

BamaJam 2011 was canceled, but the show returned to BamaJam Farms in June 2012 with Eric Church, Tim McGraw, Ronnie Milsap, Alan Jackson, the Zac Brown Band, Sheryl Crow, and Kid Rock.

== Geography ==
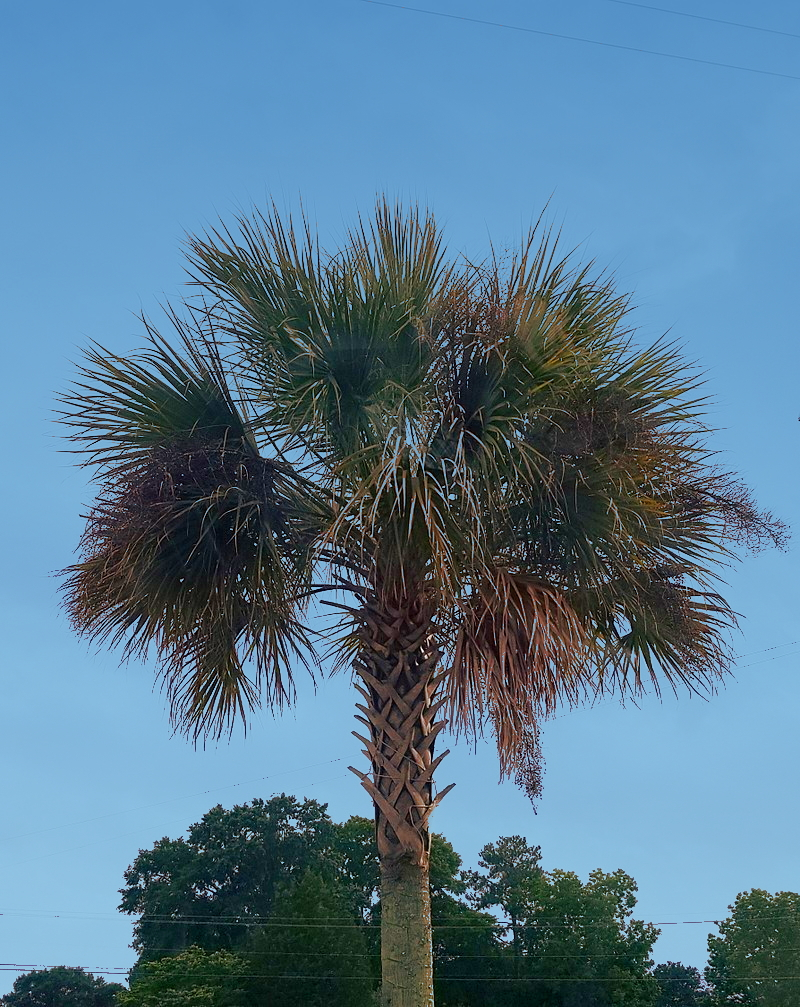
A Sabal Palmetto in Enterprise, Alabama.

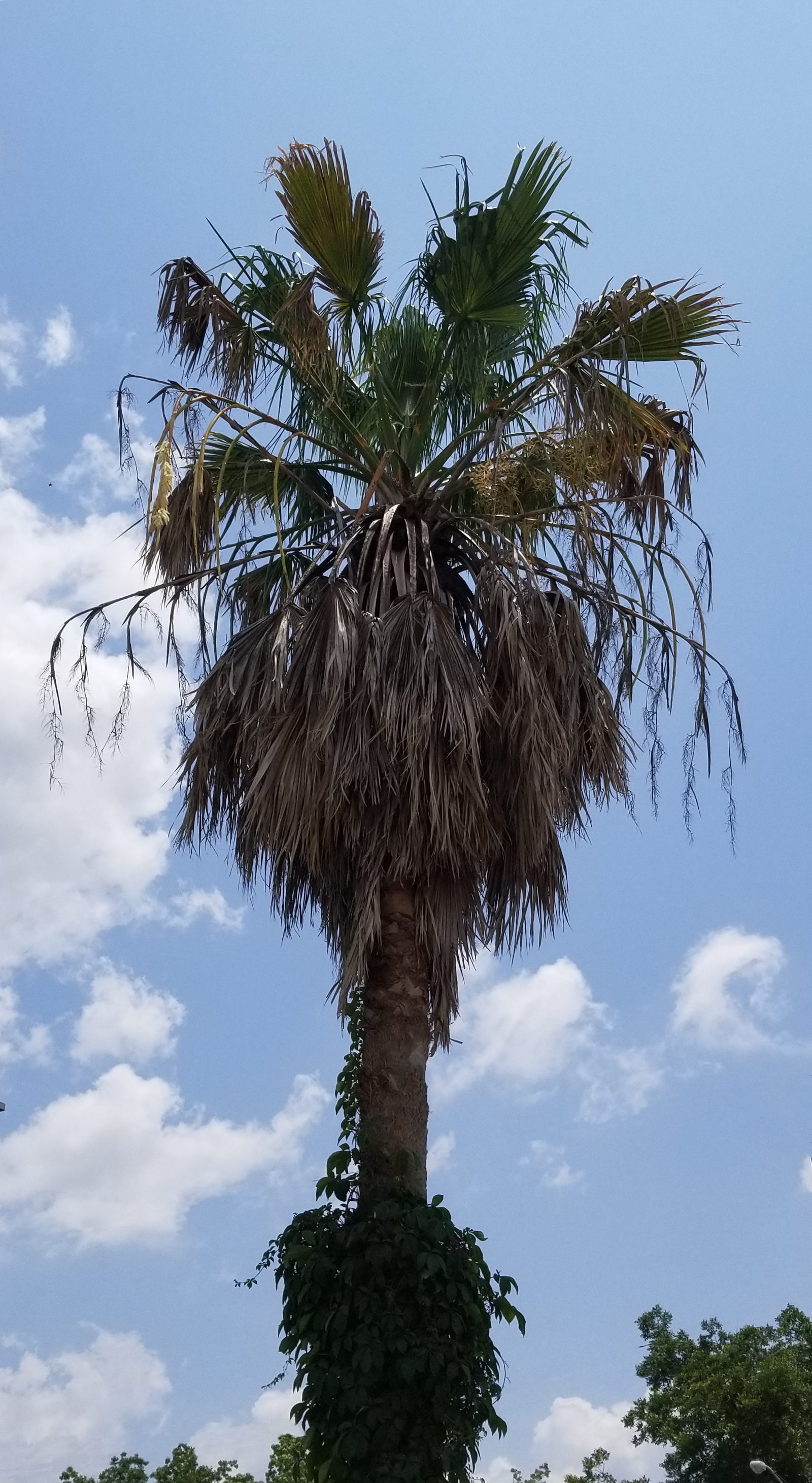
A Mexican Fan Palm tree in Enterprise, Alabama.

Major highways that run through the city include U.S. Route 84 and Alabama State Routes 27, 134, and 167. US 84 runs through the northern part of the city along Boll Weevil Circle, leading northwest 16 mi (26 km) to Elba, the Coffee County seat, and east 9 mi (14 km) to Daleville. SR 167 runs north to south on the eastern side of the city on Boll Weevil Circle, leading north 26 mi (42 km) to SR 87 south of Troy and southeast 18 mi (29 km) to Hartford. SR 134 runs west 26 mi (42 km) to Opp.

=== Climate ===
Enterprise

Climate chart (precipitation, max. and min. temperature)
J	F	M	A	M	J	J	A	S	O	N	D
5.3 60 38	4.6 64 42	5.9 72 47	4 78 54	3.6 85 62	5 90 69	6 92 71	4.5 91 71	3.9 88 66	3 80 57	4.1 71 48	4.5 62 40
- █ Average max. and min. temperatures in °F
- █ Precipitation totals in inches
- Source: NOAA
Metric conversion
J	F	M	A	M	J	J	A	S	O	N	D
135 16 3	117 18 5	149 22 9	101 26 12	91 30 17	127 32 21	152 33 22	115 33 22	98 31 19	77 26 14	104 22 9	114 17 5
- █ Average max. and min. temperatures in °C
- █ Precipitation totals in mm

The climate in this area is characterized by hot, humid summers and generally mild winters. According to the Köppen Climate Classification system, Enterprise has a humid subtropical climate, abbreviated "Cfa" on climate maps. The temperatures are moderated by its proximity to the Gulf Coast, and is part of the Wiregrass Region of Southern Alabama, Georgia, and Florida. The temperatures are usually not dissimilar from the Florida panhandle area.

It is located in USDA Plant Hardiness Zone 8B with an average minimum temperature of 15 to 20 (F). As a result of its mild to warm climate, palm trees such as Butia capitata, Sabal palmetto, Phoenix canariensis, Cycas revoluta, and Trachycarpus fortunei are widely grown throughout the city. Hurricanes and Tornadoes are common here as occasionally hurricanes can reach as far inland as Enterprise and tornadoes also can exist in Enterprise. Hurricane Eloise (1975) and Hurricane Opal (1995) caused extensive damage to the city.

Climate data for Enterprise, Alabama (1991–2020 normals, extremes 1966–present)
Month	Jan	Feb	Mar	Apr	May	Jun	Jul	Aug	Sep	Oct	Nov	Dec	Year
Record high °F (°C)	81 (27)	84 (29)	89 (32)	93 (34)	100 (38)	104 (40)	104 (40)	103 (39)	103 (39)	101 (38)	90 (32)	82 (28)	104 (40)
Mean daily maximum °F (°C)	61.0 (16.1)	64.9 (18.3)	71.9 (22.2)	78.2 (25.7)	85.7 (29.8)	90.1 (32.3)	91.5 (33.1)	91.1 (32.8)	88.0 (31.1)	80.5 (26.9)	70.6 (21.4)	62.9 (17.2)	78.0 (25.6)
Daily mean °F (°C)	49.3 (9.6)	53.1 (11.7)	59.6 (15.3)	65.6 (18.7)	73.7 (23.2)	79.2 (26.2)	81.1 (27.3)	80.8 (27.1)	77.1 (25.1)	68.4 (20.2)	58.2 (14.6)	51.5 (10.8)	66.5 (19.2)
Mean daily minimum °F (°C)	37.6 (3.1)	41.3 (5.2)	47.2 (8.4)	53.1 (11.7)	61.6 (16.4)	68.4 (20.2)	70.8 (21.6)	70.5 (21.4)	66.1 (18.9)	56.3 (13.5)	45.9 (7.7)	40.2 (4.6)	54.9 (12.7)
Record low °F (°C)	−1 (−18)	10 (−12)	17 (−8)	30 (−1)	40 (4)	49 (9)	56 (13)	59 (15)	39 (4)	32 (0)	18 (−8)	6 (−14)	−1 (−18)
Average precipitation inches (mm)	5.47 (139)	4.72 (120)	5.00 (127)	4.46 (113)	3.05 (77)	5.56 (141)	7.01 (178)	5.63 (143)	4.81 (122)	2.97 (75)	4.38 (111)	4.84 (123)	57.90 (1,471)
Average precipitation days (≥ 0.01 in)	8.4	8.3	7.9	7.3	6.3	10.8	12.6	11.0	6.8	4.8	6.5	6.8	97.5
Source: NOAA

== Notable people ==
- Kendrick Adams, NFL outside linebacker
- T. J. Barnes, NFL player
- John Battaglia, Convicted murderer executed in Texas
- Evan Beutler, soccer player
- Katie Britt, U.S. senator for Alabama
- Ethel Cain, American singer-songwriter
- Curly Chalker, country and jazz steel guitarist
- Clint Crisher, R&B singer
- Juli Crockett, retired professional boxer and theater director
- Brendan Donovan, Baseball player for the St. Louis Cardinals
- Jimmy DuBose, former NFL player
- Terry Everett, former representative from Alabama's 2nd congressional district
- Mark Fuller, federal judge for the Middle District of Alabama
- Kenneth A. Gibson, former mayor of Newark, New Jersey
- David Howard, former NFL linebacker
- April Hunter, professional wrestler and model
- Jamey Johnson, country music artist born in Enterprise
- Marcus Jones, college football player
- Jimmy McClain, NFL player
- Michael McDowell, screenwriter and author
- Barry Moore, representative from Alabama's 1st congressional district
- Ben Paschal, reserve outfielder for the 1927 Yankees
- Thomas Virgil Pittman, former federal judge
- Cedric Smith, former NFL running back
- Aud Tuten, former NHL player with the Chicago Black Hawks
- Mark Wilkerson, lead singer of Course of Nature
